= American Epic (disambiguation) =

American Epic is a film series by Bernard MacMahon.

American Epic may also refer to:

- American Epic (film series), a 2017 documentary series by Bernard MacMahon
  - American Epic: The Soundtrack, a 2017 soundtrack to the documentary series
- The American Epic Sessions, an award-winning 2017 film by Bernard MacMahon
  - Music from The American Epic Sessions: Original Motion Picture Soundtrack, a 2017 soundtrack to the film The American Epic Sessions
- American Epic: The First Time America Heard Itself, a 2017 book based on the film series
- American Epic: The Collection, a 2017 album set based on the film series
- American Epic: The Best of Blues
- American Epic: The Best of Country
- American Epic: The Best of Mississippi John Hurt
- American Epic: The Best of The Carter Family
- American Epic: The Best of Lead Belly
- American Epic: The Best of Blind Willie Johnson
- American Epic: The Best of the Memphis Jug Band

== See also ==
- America, an Epic Rhapsody, an orchestral work by Ernest Bloch
- The Epic of American Civilization, a mural by José Clemente Orozco
- National epic, any literary work that expresses the spirit or essence of a nation
