= American Epic: The Best of the Memphis Jug Band =

Compilation album by Memphis Jug Band
- Released: June 16, 2017
- Recorded: 1927–1934
- Genres: Jug band, country blues, ballad, swing
- Length: 45:01
- Labels: Lo-Max, Sony Legacy, Third Man

American Epic chronology
American Epic: The Best of Blind Willie Johnson (2017)	American Epic: The Best of the Memphis Jug Band (2017)

American Epic: The Best of the Memphis Jug Band is a compilation album released to accompany the award-winning American Epic documentary film series. It collects performances from the Memphis Jug Band's career-spanning recording sessions for Victor Records and OKeh Records between 1927 and 1934. The album was released as a 15-track download and a vinyl LP.

== Background ==
During the pre-production of the American Epic films, film director Bernard MacMahon and producers and co-writers Duke Erikson and Allison McGourty created a series of compilation album releases exploring the music of some of the performers featured in the documentaries. The Memphis Jug Band were featured in the film because MacMahon stated that "their records are the most eclectic, colorful, and exciting African-American music from the early twentieth century. It's like a mixture of everything from raw, gritty blues to ballads and pop songs, and the beats are fantastic, and it just seems to completely transcend time." The film showed how the Memphis Jug Band were the most influential and important act discovered at Ralph Peer's first Memphis recording sessions in 1927, and how the group's music would be a blueprint for hip hop decades later. The sonic breakthrough in the transfer and restoration of old shellac 78rpm discs for the American Epic films, inspired the filmmakers to source the best surviving masters of their favorite Memphis Jug Band performances and reissue them on an album intended to be a definitive compilation of the group's recorded output.

== Compilation ==
The Memphis Jug Band was first recorded by Victor Records scout Ralph Peer at a temporary studio on the fourth floor of the McCall Building just off Beale Street in Memphis, Tennessee, on February 24, 1927. The band employed instruments made out of household objects like washboards and a jug which when blown provided a heavy rhythmic bass tone. They performed a wide variety of songs-styles in their repertoire and are best known for popularizing a style known as jug band also known as skiffle. Led by Will Shade, the group featured Charlie Burse, Ben Ramey, Will Weldon, Jab Jones and a large shifting group of other musicians and guest vocalists. The album collects performances from the Memphis Jug Band's recording sessions for Victor Records and Okeh Records between 1927 and 1934. Some of these recordings were released under aliases including Memphis Sheiks and Carolina Peanut Boys. The compilation includes their first commercial recording, "Newport News Blues" about African Americans conscripted to fight in World War I at the US naval port at Newport News, Virginia. It features swing era songs like "Lindberg Hop" and standards like "You May Leave, But This Will Bring You Back" and dance tracks like "Insane Crazy Blues". It includes blues numbers like "Sometimes I Think I Love You" and "Aunt Caroline Dyer Blues" about a Newport News hoodoo fortune teller. The album incorporates songs about the wild ghetto culture of Memphis in the 1920s like "Cocaine Habit Blues", "Fourth Street Mess Around" and "Whitewash Station Blues". It includes many compositions that have been covered by numerous musicians over the subsequent decades like "K.C. Moan", about hearing the whistle of the Kansas City Southern Railway from the confines of a prison, "He's in The Jailhouse Now", "Stealin' Stealin'", and "On the Road Again" which provided a blueprint for hip hop 50 years later. Artists who have covered the songs on this compilation include Nas, Grateful Dead, Janis Joplin, Taj Mahal, The White Stripes, The Flying Burrito Brothers, Raphael Saadiq, Willie Nelson, Woody Guthrie, Arlo Guthrie, Pete Seeger, The Lovin' Spoonful, Johnny Cash, The Byrds and Bob Dylan.

== Restoration ==
New sound restoration techniques developed for the American Epic film series were utilized to restore the fifteen recordings on the album. The 78rpm record transfers were made by sound engineer Nicholas Bergh using reverse engineering techniques garnered from working with the restored first electrical sound recording system from the 1920s in The American Epic Sessions. This was followed by meticulous sound restoration on these 1920s recordings, by sound engineers Peter Henderson and Joel Tefteller, to reveal greater fidelity, presence, and clarity than had been heard before. Some of the recordings were repressed from the original metal parts, which the audio team located whilst researching the films. Henderson explained, "in some cases we were lucky enough to get some metal parts – that's the originals where they were cut to wax and the metal was put into the grooves and the discs were printed from those back in the '20s. Some of those still exist – Sony had some of them in their vaults."

== Release ==
The album was released on June 16, 2017, one month after the US broadcast of American Epic. The album was issued as a download by Sony Legacy and a vinyl LP by Third Man Records.

== Critical reception ==
The Village Voice described the sound as "re-mastering I can only call profound. Performances you might think you knew sound as if you've never heard them before — never apprehended them." Ian Anderson in fRoots said "you haven't really heard these tracks at all. Not like this. Forget bad dubs of worn-out 78s pressed on poor vinyl. The 'reverse engineering' transfers by Nicholas Bergh and subsequent restorations are so startlingly better, practically everything you will ever have experienced from this era can be discounted. And there's none of that fog of 78 surface noise which many people find too much of a distraction: suddenly, legendary artists are in the room with you."

== Track listing ==
No.	Title	Original Release	Length
1.	"Stealin' Stealin'"	Victor V-38504, 1928	2:58
2.	"On the Road Again"	Victor V-38015, 1928	2:51
3.	"Cocaine Habit Blues"	Victor V-38620, 1930	2:51
4.	"Lindberg Hop"	Victor 21740, 1928	2:50
5.	"Newport News Blues"	Victor 20576, 1927	3:09
6.	"K.C. Moan"	Victor V-38558, 1929	2:36
7.	"He's in The Jailhouse Now""	Victor 23256, 1930 - as the Memphis Sheiks	3:14
8.	"Sometimes I Think I Love You"	Victor 20809, 1927	3:08
9.	"Fourth Street Mess Around"	Victor 23251, 1930	3:19
10.	"You May Leave, But This Will Bring You Back"	Victor 23267, 1930 - as the Carolina Peanut Boys	3:05
11.	"What's the Matter"	Victor V-38551, 1929	2:55
12.	"Aunt Caroline Dyer Blues"	Victor 23347, 1929	3:07
13.	"Memphis Shakedown"	OKeh 8960, 1934	3:04
14.	"Whitewash Station Blues"	Victor V-38504, 1928	2:46
15.	"Insane Crazy Blues"	OKeh 8959, 1934 - as Charlie Burse with Memphis Jug Band	3:08
Total length:			45:01

== Personnel ==
- Will Shade – vocals, guitar, harmonica, spoons
- Ben Ramey – kazoo
- Will Weldon – guitar
- Charlie Polk – guitar, jug
- Shakey Walter – harmonica
- Charlie Burse – vocals, guitar, mandolin
- Vol Stevens – banjo-mandolin
- Jab Jones – vocals, jug
- Teewee Blackman – vocals, guitar
- Hattie Hart – vocals
- Charlie Nickerson – vocals
- Charlie Pierce – violin
- Robert Burse – percussion
- Bernard MacMahon – editor, compiler, producer
- Nicholas Bergh – 78 rpm transfers, mastering
- Peter Henderson – restoration, mastering, producer
- Duke Erikson – restoration, mastering, producer
- Joel Tefteller – restoration, mastering
- John Polito – mastering
- Ellis Burman – mastering
- Allison McGourty – producer
- Adam Block – producer
- Patrick Ferris – associate producer
- Jack McLean – associate producer
- Nat Strimpopulos – artwork
