= American Epic: The Best of Blues =

Compilation album by Various artists
- Released: June 16, 2017
- Recorded: 1927–1936
- Genre: Blues
- Length: 56:00 (download) 40:03 (vinyl)
- Labels: Lo-Max, Sony Legacy, Third Man

American Epic chronology
| Music from The American Epic Sessions (2017) | American Epic: The Best of Blues (2017) | American Epic: The Best of Country (2017) |

American Epic: The Best of Blues is a compilation of early blues songs recorded between 1927 and 1936 and released to accompany the American Epic films in 2017. The album was released as a 17-track download and a 13-track vinyl LP. The album was praised by critics as the definitive pre-war blues compilation.

== Background ==
During the pre-production of the American Epic documentary films, director Bernard MacMahon and producers and co-writers Allison McGourty and Duke Erikson decided to create a series of compilation album releases to expand on the music and performers featured in the documentaries. Contributing to this decision was a new technology in use for transferring and restoring old shellac 78rpm discs for the film's soundtrack. The blues compilation was prepared along with a country compilation, five individual artist compilations and a 5-CD box set, American Epic: The Collection.

== Compilation ==
The album concentrates on the first electrically recorded blues discs made in North America between 1927 and 1931. It covers a broad range of blues music, from Mississippi Delta artists such as, Charley Patton, Son House and Skip James to Memphis songsters like Frank Stokes and jug bands including the Memphis Jug Band and Cannon's Jug Stompers, Piedmont blues players like Blind Willie McTell and Texas gospel blues evangelist Blind Willie Johnson.

"It's a great project because there are a lot of people who don't know this music from this period of time. Electrical recording started in 1926 and it really was the first time that you could record music in a way that it was nice to listen to. It's all part of the history of music that continued on from that point. Led Zeppelin, Eric Clapton – all their music reverts back to this lineage, and the same with the folk music from that time. That lineage is all a little bit forgotten."

— Peter Henderson

The compilation also featured female country blues musicians like Geeshie Wiley and Mattie Delaney who were quite unusual at the time. The album opened with its sole later recording from 1936 - Robert Johnson's "Cross Road Blues" which was itself inspired by the earlier recordings on the set and would become the conduit for later generations into rediscovering these hugely influential late 20s and early 30s blues recordings.

== Restoration ==
New transfer and sound restoration techniques developed for the American Epic documentary films were utilized to restore the 17 songs on the album. The 78 rpm disc transfers were made by audio engineer Nicholas Bergh using 'reverse engineering' techniques garnered from working with the original 1920s recording equipment on The American Epic Sessions along with meticulous sound restoration undertaken by Peter Henderson and Joel Tefteller to reveal greater fidelity, presence and clarity to these 1920s and 1930s recordings than had been heard before. Nicholas Bergh commented "the recordings in this set are special since they utilize the earliest and simplest type of electric recording equipment used for commercial studio work. As a result, they have an unrivaled immediacy to the sound."

The Paramount Records discs presented considerable problems for the audio engineers, as Henderson explained "some of the Charley Patton recordings were very noisy just because they're Paramount Records and they're the hardest to restore," Henderson says. "There'd be so much noise, and that's very difficult to remove manually." Some of the selections were repressed from the original metal parts, which the production located whilst researching the films. Peter Henderson explained "in some cases we were lucky enough to get some metal parts – that's the originals where they were cut to wax and the metal was put into the grooves and the discs were printed from those back in the '20s. Some of those still exist – Sony had some of them in their vaults."

== Reception ==
Professional ratings
Review scores
| Source | Rating |
|---|---|
| Vice (Expert Witness) | A |

The album was acclaimed for its song selection and the quality of the restoration work.

Robert Christgau in Noisey reviewing the 17-track download, awarded the album an A grade and made it his number 2 Best Album of 2017, writing "anyone interested owns somewhat fainter and scratchier versions of tracks on this definitive country blues compilation. But conceptually and song for song, these 17 clear, rich, cannily sequenced Duke Erikson remasters—Delta guys mostly, with hokum bands and two Texans mixed in for extra flavor—leaves them in the dust. Bernard MacMahon defies convention by beginning with an anachronistic culmination—Robert Johnson's mythic "Cross Road Blues" was cut in 1937 (sic), well after country blues's 78 rpm flowering. He blends in the warhorses-in-waiting "'Tain't Nobody's Business," "Walk Right In," and "Sitting on Top of the World." He welcomes Mattie Delaney's polished, still obscure "Tallahatchie River Blues" and Geeshie Wiley's eerie, now canonical "Last Kind Word Blues" into an assertively male canon. And he justifies the ongoing mystification of Blind Willie Johnson's hummed, moaned, postverbal "Dark Was the Night, Cold Was the Ground" by closing with it, as if to prove that, in the end, the message of this music is beyond words." He summarized the album as a "titantc American Epic blues compilation". Randy Lewis in the Los Angeles Times praised the reverse engineering noting "one unforeseen fringe benefit of the reconstruction of the original recording machine: playing records that were made with it decades ago yields unprecedented audio fidelity." Ed Whitelock in PopMatters wrote that "it must be noted that the re-mastering of the American Epic tracks show the benefit both of 25 years of technological improvement and the tireless work of the producers; simply said, the songs sound better here than on any other release I have heard." The audio restoration was described by Greil Marcus in The Village Voice as "re-mastering I can only call profound. Performances you might think you knew sound as if you've never heard them before — never apprehended them." Ian Anderson in fRoots in reviewing the work added "you haven't really heard these tracks at all. Not like this. Forget bad dubs of worn-out 78s pressed on poor vinyl. The 'reverse engineering' transfers by Nicholas Bergh and subsequent restorations are so startlingly better, practically everything you will ever have experienced from this era can be discounted and CD is the best way to hear them. The clarity of group recordings where every instrument is well defined, and of solo artists where their instruments and voices suddenly sound real, will have you on the edge of your seat. And there's none of that fog of 78 surface noise which many people find too much of a distraction: suddenly, legendary artists are in the room with you".

== Track listing ==
=== Digital download ===
| No. | Title | Original Artist and year | Length |
|---|---|---|---|
| 1. | "Cross Road Blues" | Robert Johnson 1936 | 2:32 |
| 2. | "On The Road Again" | Memphis Jug Band 1928 | 2:51 |
| 3. | "Louis Collins" | Mississippi John Hurt 1928 | 3:01 |
| 4. | "Sittin' on Top of the World" | Mississippi Sheiks 1930 | 3:16 |
| 5. | "'Tain't Nobody's Business If I Do (Pt. 1)" | Frank Stokes 1928 | 3:17 |
| 6. | "Down the Dirt Road Blues" | Charley Patton 1929 | 2:56 |
| 7. | "My Black Mama (Parts 1 & 2)" | Son House 1930 | 6:24 |
| 8. | "Walk Right In" | Cannon's Jug Stompers 1929 | 2:57 |
| 9. | "The Panama Limited" | Washington White 1930 | 3:12 |
| 10. | "Last Kind Words Blues" | Geeshie Wiley 1930 | 3:04 |
| 11. | "Cottonfield Blues (Pt. 2)" | Garfield Akers 1929 | 3:21 |
| 12. | "Tallahatchie River Blues" | Mattie Delaney 1930 | 2:48 |
| 13. | "Mamma, 'Tain't Long Fo' Day" | Blind Willie McTell 1927 | 3:13 |
| 14. | "Future Blues" | Willie Brown 1930 | 2:57 |
| 15. | "Cool Drink of Water Blues" | Tommy Johnson 1928 | 3:34 |
| 16. | "Cypress Grove Blues" | Skip James 1931 | 3:16 |
| 17. | "Dark Was the Night, Cold Was the Ground" | Blind Willie Johnson 1927 | 3:27 |
| Total length: | | | 59:10 |

=== LP ===
Side one
| No. | Title | Original Artist and year | Length |
|---|---|---|---|
| 1. | "Cross Road Blues" | Robert Johnson 1936 | 2:32 |
| 2. | "Cypress Grove Blues" | Skip James 1931 | 3:16 |
| 3. | "Louis Collins" | Mississippi John Hurt 1928 | 3:01 |
| 4. | "On the Road Again" | Memphis Jug Band 1928 | 2:51 |
| 5. | "Tallahatchie River Blues" | Mattie Delaney 1930 | 2:48 |
| 6. | "Down the Dirt Road Blues" | Charley Patton 1929 | 2:56 |
| 7. | "Future Blues" | Willie Brown 1930 | 2:57 |
| Total length: | | | 20:21 |

Side two
| No. | Title | Original Artist and year | Length |
|---|---|---|---|
| 1. | "Sittin' on Top of the World" | Mississippi Sheiks 1930 | 3:16 |
| 2. | "My Black Mama (Part 1)" | Son House 1930 | 3:08 |
| 3. | "Last Kind Words Blues" | Geeshie Wiley 1930 | 3:04 |
| 4. | "Cool Drink of Water Blues" | Tommy Johnson 1928 | 3:34 |
| 5. | "Mamma, 'Tain't Long Fo' Day" | Blind Willie McTell 1927 | 3:13 |
| 6. | "Dark Was the Night, Cold Was the Ground" | Blind Willie Johnson 1927 | 3:27 |
| Total length: | | | 19:42 |

== Personnel ==
- Robert Johnson – vocals, guitar (track 1)
- Will Shade – guitar, vocal (track 2)
- Ben Ramey – kazoo (track 2)
- Charlie Burse – guitar, vocals (track 2)
- Jab Jones – jug (track 2)
- Mississippi John Hurt – vocals, guitar (track 3)
- Walter Vinson – guitar, vocals (track 4)
- Lonnie Chatman – violin (track 4)
- Frank Stokes – vocals, guitar (track 5)
- Dan Sane – guitar (track 5)
- Charley Patton – vocals, guitar (track 6)
- Son House – vocals, guitar (track 7)
- Gus Cannon – banjo, jug, vocals (track 8)
- Hosea Woods – guitar, vocal, kazoo (track 8)
- Noah Lewis – harmonica (track 8)
- Booker T. Washington White – vocals, guitar (track 9)
- Geeshie Wiley – vocals, guitar (track 10)
- Garfield Akers – vocals, guitar (track 11)
- Joe Callicott – guitar (track 11)
- Mattie Delaney – vocals, guitar (track 12)
- Blind Willie McTell – vocals, guitar (track 13)
- Willie Brown – vocals, guitar (track 14)
- Tommy Johnson – vocals, guitar (track 15)
- Charlie McCoy – guitar (track 15)
- Skip James – vocals, guitar (track 16)
- Blind Willie Johnson – guitar, vocals (track 17)
- Allison McGourty – compiler, producer
- Bernard MacMahon – editor, producer
- Nicholas Bergh – 78 rpm transfers, mastering
- Peter Henderson – restoration, mastering, producer
- Duke Erikson – restoration, mastering, producer
- Joel Tefteller – restoration, mastering
- John Polito – mastering
- Ellis Burman – mastering
- Adam Block – producer
- Patrick Ferris – associate producer
- Jack McLean – associate producer
- Nat Strimpopulos – artwork
