= American Epic: The Best of Country =

Compilation album by Various artists
- Released: June 16, 2017
- Recorded: 1922–1934
- Genre: Country, folk
- Length: 49:45 (download) 36:58 (vinyl)
- Label: Lo-Max, Sony Legacy, Third Man

American Epic chronology
American Epic: The Best of Blues (2017)	American Epic: The Best of Country (2017)	American Epic: The Best of Mississippi John Hurt (2017)

American Epic: The Best of Country is a compilation of early country and folk songs recorded between 1922 and 1934 and released in 2017 to accompany the award-winning American Epic documentary film series. The album was released as a 16-track download and a 12-track vinyl LP.

== Background ==
The album was compiled by the American Epic film producers and co-writers Allison McGourty, Duke Erikson and director Bernard MacMahon to provide an overview of the country and folk music researched for the documentary series and as a sampler of the music featured on the 5-CD box set American Epic: The Collection.

== Compilation ==
The download album features 16 songs recorded in the 1920s and 30s and covers a broad range of rural American country and folk music, including female-led Appalachian country from the Carter Family, Texas white country blues from Prince Albert Hunt, an ancient English folk song from Clarence Ashley, a murder ballad from West Virginia coal miner Dick Justice, Kentucky country gospel from Alfred Karnes, a North Carolina mountain ballad from Bascom Lamar Lunsford, an Alabama fiddle reel from the Stripling Brothers, and a Tennessee hoedown by Uncle Dave Macon.

== Restoration ==
New sound restoration techniques developed for the American Epic film series were utilized to restore the sixteen 1920s and 30s recordings on the album. The 78rpm record transfers were made by sound engineer Nicholas Bergh using reverse engineering techniques garnered from working with the restored first electrical sound recording system from the 1920s in The American Epic Sessions. This was followed by meticulous sound restoration by sound engineers Peter Henderson and Joel Tefteller to reveal greater fidelity, presence and clarity to these 1920s and 1930s recordings than had been heard before. Some of the recordings were repressed from the original metal parts, which the production located whilst researching the films. Henderson explained, “in some cases we were lucky enough to get some metal parts – that’s the originals where they were cut to wax and the metal was put into the grooves and the discs were printed from those back in the ‘20s. Some of those still exist – Sony had some of them in their vaults.”

== Release ==
The album was released on June 16, 2017, seventeen days after the US broadcast of the American Epic documentary films. The album was issued as a download, and on a truncated and completely re-sequenced vinyl LP which featured a song not available on the download – Eck Robertson's 1922 recording of “Sallie Gooden”.

== Critical reception ==
Professional ratings
Review scores
Source	Rating
Vice (Expert Witness)	B+
Tom Hull	A−

Robert Christgau in Noisey awarded the download album an B+ grade, stating “for me, this might well replace Legacy's White Country Blues whenever I need reminding that the Trumper-spawning white supremacists who lost the Civil War had their moments of blessed foolishness, bemused melancholy, and supernal grace.” The restoration work was described by Greil Marcus in The Village Voice as “re-mastering I can only call profound. Performances you might think you knew sound as if you’ve never heard them before — never apprehended them.” Robert Baird in Stereophile added that “what's most interesting for audiophiles is the huge improvement in the quality of the sound coming from these 78 transfers.” Ian Anderson in fRoots, reviewing the restoration, wrote “you haven’t really heard these tracks at all. Not like this. Forget bad dubs of worn-out 78s pressed on poor vinyl. The ‘reverse engineering’ transfers by Nicholas Bergh and subsequent restorations are so startlingly better, practically everything you will ever have experienced from this era can be discounted and CD is the best way to hear them. The clarity of group recordings where every instrument is well defined, and of solo artists where their instruments and voices suddenly sound real, will have you on the edge of your seat. And there's none of that fog of 78 surface noise which many people find too much of a distraction: suddenly, legendary artists are in the room with you”.

== Track listing ==
=== Digital download ===
No.	Title	Original Artist and year	Length
1.	"Bury Me Under the Weeping Willow"	The Carter Family 1927	3:00
2.	"If the River was Whiskey"	Charlie Poole and the North Carolina Ramblers 1930	3:11
3.	"The Coo Coo Bird"	Clarence Ashley 1929	2:59
4.	"Waiting for a Train"	Jimmie Rodgers 1928	2:47
5.	"Henry Lee"	Dick Justice 1929	3:27
6.	"Sail Away Ladies"	Uncle Dave Macon and His Fruit Jar Drinker 1927	3:01
7.	"I Wish I Was a Mole in the Ground"	Bascom Lamar Lunsford 1928	3:20
8.	"Stackalee"	Frank Hutchison 1927	3:07
9.	"Peg and Awl"	Carolina Tar Heels 1928	2:58
10.	"Blues in a Bottle"	Prince Albert Hunt's Texas Ramblers 1928	3:25
11.	"Ladies on the Steamboat"	Burnett and Rutherford 1927	3:17
12.	"Country Blues"	Dock Boggs 1927	3:04
13.	"Brown Skin Gal (Down the Lane)"	Massey Family 1934	2:48
14.	"I Am Bound for the Promised Land"	Alfred G. Karnes 1927	3:13
15.	"I Get My Whiskey from Rockingham"	Earl Johnson and His Clodhoppers 1927	3:04
16.	"The Lost Child"	Stripling Brothers 1928	3:09
Total length:			49:45

=== LP ===
Side one
No.	Title	Original Artist and year	Length
1.	"If the River was Whiskey"	Charlie Poole and the North Carolina Ramblers 1930	3:11
2.	"I Wish I Was a Mole in the Ground"	Bascom Lamar Lunsford 1928	3:20
3.	"Peg and Awl"	Carolina Tar Heels 1928	2:58
4.	"Ladies on the Steamboat"	Burnett and Rutherford 1927	3:17
5.	"The Coo Coo Bird"	Clarence Ashley 1929	2:59
6.	"Sail Away Ladies"	Uncle Dave Macon and His Fruit Jar Drinker 1927	3:01
Total length:			18:46

Side two
No.	Title	Original Artist and year	Length
1.	"Waiting for a Train"	Jimmie Rodgers 1928	2:47
2.	"I Get My Whiskey from Rockingham"	Earl Johnson and His Clodhoppers 1927	3:04
3.	"Sallie Gooden"	A.C. (Eck) Robertson 1922	3:10
4.	"Stackalee"	Frank Hutchison 1927	3:07
5.	"Country Blues"	Dock Boggs 1927	3:04
6.	"Bury Me Under the Weeping Willow"	The Carter Family 1927	3:00
Total length:			18:12

== Personnel ==
(download edition)

- Sara Carter: vocal, autoharp (track 1)
- Maybelle Carter: vocal, guitar (track 1)
- A. P. Carter: vocal (track 1)
- Charlie Poole: vocal, banjo (track 2)
- Odell Smith: fiddle (track 2)
- Roy Harvey: guitar (track 2)
- Clarence Ashley: banjo, vocal (track 3)
- Jimmie Rodgers: vocal (disc 4)
- C. L. Hutchison: cornet (disc 4)
- James Rickard: clarinet (disc 4)
- John Westbrook: steel guitar (disc 4)
- Dean Bryan: guitar (disc 4)
- George MacMillan: string bass (disc 4)
- Dick Justice: vocal, guitar (track 5)
- Uncle Dave Macon: vocal, banjo (track 6)
- Sam McGee: guitar, vocal (track 6)
- Kirk McGee: fiddle, vocal (track 6)
- Mazy Todd: fiddle (track 6)
- Bascom Lamar Lunsford: vocal, banjo (track 7)
- Frank Hutchison: vocals, guitar, harmonica (track 8)
- Dock Walsh: banjo, vocal (track 9)
- Clarence Ashley: guitar, vocal (track 9)
- Garley Foster: harmonica, guitar (track 9)
- Archie ‘Prince’ Albert Hunt: fiddle, vocal (track 10)
- Oscar Harper: guitar (track 10)
- Leonard Rutherford: fiddle (track 11)
- Richard D. Burnett: banjo, vocal effect (track 11)
- Dock Boggs: vocal, banjo (track 12)
- Curt Massey: fiddle (track 13)
- Larry Wellington: accordion, piano (track 13)
- Milt Mabie: string bass (track 13)
- Alfred G. Karnes: vocal, guitar (track 14)
- Earl Johnson: fiddle, vocal (track 15)
- Emmett Bankston: banjo, vocal (track 15)
- Lee ‘Red’ Henderson: guitar (track 15)
- Charles Stripling: fiddle (track 16)
- Ira Stripling: guitar (track 16)
- Bernard MacMahon - editor, compiler, producer
- Nicholas Bergh - 78 rpm transfers, mastering
- Peter Henderson - restoration, mastering, producer
- Duke Erikson - restoration, mastering, producer
- Joel Tefteller - restoration, mastering
- John Polito - mastering
- Ellis Burman - mastering
- Allison McGourty - producer
- Adam Block - producer
- Patrick Ferris - associate producer
- Jack McLean - associate producer
- Nat Strimpopulos: artwork
