= Music from The American Epic Sessions: Original Motion Picture Soundtrack =

Soundtrack album by Various artists
- Released: June 9, 2017
- Genres: Cajun, country, blues, folk, Hawaiian, Hispanic, Mexican, rock, Tex-Mex
- Length: 89:35 (deluxe), 36:47 (standard)
- Labels: Lo-Max, Columbia, Third Man
- Producers: T Bone Burnett, Jack White, Duke Erikson, Bernard MacMahon

American Epic chronology
American Epic: The Soundtrack (2017)	Music from The American Epic Sessions: Original Motion Picture Soundtrack (2017)	American Epic: The Best Of Blues (2017)

Music from The American Epic Sessions: Original Motion Picture Soundtrack is the official 2017 soundtrack album of the award-winning film The American Epic Sessions. The album features twenty-three music acts recording songs live on the restored first electrical sound recording system from the 1920s. The artists participating include Nas, Alabama Shakes, Elton John, Willie Nelson, Merle Haggard, Jack White, Taj Mahal, Ana Gabriel, Pokey LaFarge, Beck, Ashley Monroe, and Steve Martin. The album won a Grammy Award for Best American Roots Performance for the Alabama Shakes' performance of "Killer Diller".

== Background ==
"Our original idea was to film a typical 1920s recording session, so I got in touch with Frank Fairfield and the Americans—who play very much in the style and spirit of that period—and with T Bone Burnett providing production advice, we filmed a number of songs. It was like a séance, communing with the musical ghosts of the past through this equipment that had not been used in almost ninety years—it felt like the echoes of Bessie Smith, Louis Armstrong, and Jimmie Rodgers were still flowing through the wires. And the sound was amazing: clear and punchy, but utterly different from a modern recording."

— Bernard MacMahon

The American Epic Sessions film and soundtrack was conceived by director Bernard MacMahon as a practical implementation of the music and technology explored in the first three American Epic films which focused on the first recordings of roots music in the USA in the 1920s. Film producer Allison McGourty explained, "if the first three American Epic films are like the story of the Apollo [first crewed Moon landing] mission, with unseen film footage, interviews with the astronauts and scientists, then…The American Epic Sessions, is where we rebuild the rocket and go to the moon ourselves." MacMahon added that the idea for The American Epic Sessions film and the soundtrack album was born out of a desire to understand on a practical level how the first electrical recordings in the 1920s were made, "you can only truly appreciate history, and understand why things were done the way they were done, by actually going out and doing them yourself." The soundtrack album involved replicating a 1920s recording session, down to the smallest detail, with twenty-three contemporary music acts recording live on the original 1920s equipment in back to back sessions just as the original rural performers would have done over 80 years ago. The film and soundtrack involved a decade of work restoring the machine, which was pieced together from spare parts scattered across the globe. MacMahon invited Jack White and T Bone Burnett to produce the sessions, and secured the use of Vox studios in Hollywood, purportedly the oldest private recording studio in the world, built in 1936, to film and record the live performances.

== Content ==
The musicians were encouraged to record both a vintage song and a song they had written. MacMahon and Duke Erikson created a list of vintage songs that they wanted to feature in the film and specifically chose songs for particular performers; "Mal Hombre" for Ana Gabriel, "On the Road Again" for Nas, "Tomi Tomi" for the Hawaiians and "Nobody's Dirty Business" for Bettye LaVette. Other performers researched the period and selected their own vintage songs; Jack White unearthed "Matrimonial Intentions", The Avett Brothers chose "Jordan Am a Hard Road" and Rhiannon Giddens covered Ida Cox's "One Hour Mama". Most of the performers recorded two songs, although the duration of the film precluded all these performances appearing in the finished film. Some performers wrote songs specifically for the film - Merle Haggard composed "The Only Man Wilder Than Me" as a duet for him and Willie Nelson to perform. Elton John arrived at the studio with a lyric entitled "Two Fingers of Whiskey" that Bernie Taupin had written specifically for the film. Elton proceeded to write the melody live on camera and arrange the song with Jack White and recorded the song live direct to disc without leaving the room during the whole process. The soundtrack included twelve additional songs not featured in the film, including "One Mic" by Nas, "Mama's Angel Child" by Jack White, "Come On In My Kitchen" by Stephen Stills, and "Josephine" by Pokey Lafarge.

== Recording ==
=== Western Electric recording system ===
In 1925, Western Electric launched a new electronic recording system. The machine revolutionized the recording of music because it could record every type of instrument and voice whereas the acoustic horn recordings that predated it were severely limited in what they could record effectively. The new system consisted of an electrical microphone whose signal was amplified by a 6' amplifier rack. The amplified signal was then sent to a cutting head that cut a wax disc on a Scully cutting lathe that was pulley powered by a 100Ib brass weight. In the 1920s as radio took over the pop music business, record companies were forced to expand their markets and leave their studios in major cities in search of new musical styles and markets. They organized field recording sessions across America and recorded blues, gospel, Cajun, country, Hawaiian, Native American, and many other hitherto unrecorded types of music. The Western Electric system technologically made these recordings possible. These recordings would go on to have vast cultural impact in North America and the rest of the world. The recording system was leased out to the major record labels who had to pay a royalty, on every record sold, to Western Electric. The success of these music recordings led to the system being leased by the major Hollywood studios for talking pictures after initial resistance. Although there are no records of how many of these machines were leased out to the record companies, estimates range from a dozen to two dozen. Prior to the release of The American Epic Sessions, the recording system was mysterious and had not been seen in almost 80 years. American Epic engineer Nicholas Bergh explained, "I had two mentors when I was getting into audio who started their careers in the late 1930s in America and both of them told me that even by the late '30s this system was basically mythical and they had never seen any components of it or even pictures. So even in ten years it had basically disappeared off the face of the earth."

=== Restoring the recording system ===
At the outset of the pre-production of the American Epic documentary series there were no known photos or film footage of the Western Electric system. Midway through the research on the film, MacMahon was introduced to sound engineer Nicholas Bergh as a possible collaborator. Bergh revealed that he had spent almost a decade attempting to restore the Western Electric system, scavenging spare parts from around the world in places as far away as Japan and Europe in his quest to complete the system. "All the individual items had to come from different places, often thousands of miles apart" he explained, "I was able to confirm my progress by studying the few crude music studio pictures that started to show up." However, Bergh was missing a vital part of the set up – the pulley driven Scully lathe. On an exploratory trip to the Scully family looking for photographs, MacMahon discovered in the family's basement perhaps the only surviving 1924 Scully lathe and persuaded them to loan it to the production. MacMahon then set about persuading Bergh to engineer a session with contemporary artists recording on the system. Bergh was nervous about doing this as "moving that [the recording system] into a production environment, that was a major change." MacMahon persuaded Bergh to participate in a test session with two new artists so as to limit the pressure. Frank Fairfield and The Americans were the first musicians to record on the system in over 80 years. "The results were satisfactory" MacMahon explained, "but Nick wanted to operate the machine more effectively". Producer and co-writer Allison McGourty gained access to the AT&T archive which kept the research documents for Western Electric. Within the archive they located engineers' casebooks and accounting forms that gave some more clues as to how to operate the machine. They also managed to locate 1920s photographs of the recording system being used in the Western Electric laboratory. Armed with this new information, Bergh agreed to MacMahon's plan to attempt a full recording session with twenty-three artists.

=== Recording process ===
The Western Electric system was a live Direct-to-disc recording recording method. The earliest condenser microphone was wired into a six-foot amplifier rack comprising a preamplifier, a first level meter, a monitor amplifier, a line amplifier to drive the cutting head which etched the grooves onto a wax disc on the turntable of a Scully cutting lathe that was rotated by a pulley system and a 100 pounds (45 kg) weight. The performers gathered around the microphone and carefully positioned themselves to achieve the correct balance. The performers were cued into when they needed to start and stop playing by a light system operated by the sound engineer that hung in the live room. The pulley allowed approximately three and a half minutes to record before the weight hit the floor. The calibration of the lathe has determined the length of the pop single to this day.

The Western Electric recording system favored small vocal-led groups, and this had a fundamental influence on them being the dominant musical aggregation to this day. The recording system does not allow for any changes to be made to the live recording.

== Release ==
Music from the American Epic Sessions was released on June 9, 2017, three days after the US broadcast of The American Epic Sessions. It was released in a standard and deluxe format. The standard edition contained 13 tracks, and was released as a download. The deluxe format contained 32 tracks and was released on double CD, digital download and triple vinyl. The vinyl release was launched with American Epic film screenings at Third Man Records in Detroit and Nashville. The albums sold at both these events were an exclusive white vinyl pressing.

== Critical reception ==
Professional ratings
Review scores
Source	Rating
The Australian	5/5 stars
The Herald	Very favorable
The Independent	4/4 stars

The album was released to widespread critical acclaim, with many publications praising the performances and the quality of the sound. Iain Shedden in The Australian awarded it five stars and wrote that "this double album features the highlights of those sessions and it's an exquisite representation of the primitive power of American roots music and its enduring charm – music that stirs soul." Greil Marcus in The Village Voice praised "performances so good you can hardly listen without thinking of how close each recording is to not existing at all." Andy Gill in The Independent praised "Nas's hip-hop adaptation of the Memphis Jug Band's "On The Road Again" reflecting timeless themes and vocabulary of the black experience" adding that "Alabama Shakes' terrific version of "Killer Diller Blues" is brimful of the bounce and sass." In France, Dominique Boulay in Paris Move wrote "for this beautiful soundtrack, Nicholas Bergh is the brilliant engineer who has collected the original parts of the recording system and it is therefore thanks to him (and the artists of course) that we now have this gem!" Ludovic Hunter-Tilney in the Financial Times noted that "New York Rapper Nas does a superb cover of the Memphis Jug Band's "On the Road Again", exposing the hip-hop blueprint within the 1928 stomper." Jerobear in Review Corner wrote that "It's impressive, and it contains enough of the antique feel to be quaint, and just enough studio engineering to sound good to modern ears. Producers T Bone Burnett and (predictably) Jack White line up a roster of stars in front of the mic to sing the old songs, and it works a treat." Keith Bruce in The Herald concluded that the album "resulted in a slew of recording sessions, far beyond what was used on the programmes, where musicians old and young responded to the challenge of one-take recording to a disc-cutting lathe operated by clock-work and pulleys, that time-limited your performance. "You feel like your soul is coming out of the speaker," says Rhiannon Giddens. She is one of the younger contributors to this wonderful double album, along with Pokey LaFarge and Nas (Nasir Jones), who is a revelation."

The album won a Grammy Award for the Alabama Shakes' performance of "Killer Diller".

== Track listing ==
=== Deluxe edition CD ===
==== Disc one ====
No.	Title	Writer(s)	Artist	Length
1.	"Killer Diller"	Memphis Minnie	Alabama Shakes	2:12
2.	"On The Road Again"	J.B. Jones and Will Shade	Nas	2:00
3.	"Candy Man"	Rev. Gary Davis	Jerron "Blind Boy" Paxton	2:53
4.	"2 Fingers Of Whiskey"	Elton John and Bernie Taupin	Elton John and Jack White	2:52
5.	"The Coo Coo Bird"	Traditional	Steve Martin and Edie Brickell	3:19
6.	"Like A Rose"	Ashley Monroe, Guy Clark, Jon Randall	Ashley Monroe	3:06
7.	"The Only Man Wilder Than Me"	Merle Haggard	Willie Nelson & Merle Haggard	2:03
8.	"Matrimonial Intentions"	Traditional	Jack White	3:08
9.	"One Hour Mama"	Porter Grainger	Rhiannon Giddens	3:06
10.	"Mal Hombre"	Lydia Mendoza	Ana Gabriel	3:35
11.	"El Cascabel"	Lorenzo Barcelata	Los Lobos	2:24
12.	"Closer Walk With Thee"	Traditional	The Avett Brothers	3:28
13.	"Fourteen Rivers, Fourteen Floods"	Beck Hansen	Beck	2:41
Total length:				34:47

==== Disc two ====
No.	Title	Writer(s)	Artist	Length
1.	"Nobody's Dirty Business"	Frank Stokes	Bettye LaVette	2:15
2.	"St. Louis Blues"	W.C. Handy	Pokey Lafarge	3:30
3.	"High Water Everywhere, Part 2"	Charley Patton	Taj Mahal	3:12
4.	"One Mic"	Nasir Jones, Chucky Thompson	Nas	3:18
5.	"Pretty Saro"	Traditional	Rhiannon Giddens	2:41
6.	"Jubilee"	Jean Ritchie	Ashley Monroe and The Americans	2:43
7.	"Tous les Matins"	Louis Michot	The Lost Bayou Ramblers	2:46
8.	"When I Woke Up this Morning"	Jim Jackson	Bettye LaVette	2:29
9.	"If The River Was Whiskey"	Charlie Poole	Frank Fairfield	2:05
10.	"Stealin Stealin"	Will Shade	Raphael Saadiq	2:40
11.	"Jordan am a Hard Road to Travel"	Daniel Emmett	The Avett Brothers	2:47
12.	"Sail Away Ladies"	Traditional	The Americans	2:04
13.	"Tomi Tomi"	Traditional	The Hawaiians	2:29
14.	"Last Kind Words"	Geeshie Wiley	Christine Pizzuti	2:50
15.	"Come On In My Kitchen"	Robert Johnson	Stephen Stills	2:21
16.	"Mama's Angel Child"	Sweet Papa Stovepipe	Jack White	3:01
17.	"Josephine"	Pokey Lafarge	Pokey Lafarge	3:12
18.	"Hilo Hanakahi"	Keola Nalium	The Hawaiians	3:44
19.	"Old Fashioned Love"	James P. Johnson, Cecil Mack	Willie Nelson and Merle Haggard	2:41
Total length:				52:48

=== Vinyl ===
==== Side one ====
No.	Title	Writer(s)	Artist	Length
1.	"Killer Diller""	Memphis Minnie	Alabama Shakes	2:12
2.	"On The Road Again"	J.B. Jones and Will Shade	Nas	2:00
3.	"Candy Man"	Rev. Gary Davis	Jerron "Blind Boy" Paxton	2:53
4.	"2 Fingers Of Whiskey"	Elton John and Bernie Taupin	Elton John and Jack White	2:52
5.	"The Coo Coo Bird"	Traditional	Steve Martin and Edie Brickell	3:19
6.	"Like A Rose"	Ashley Monroe, Guy Clark, Jon Randall	Ashley Monroe	3:06
Total length:				16:22

==== Side two ====
No.	Title	Writer(s)	Artist	Length
1.	"The Only Man Wilder Than Me"	Merle Haggard	Willie Nelson & Merle Haggard	2:03
2.	"Matrimonial Intentions"	Traditional	Jack White	3:08
3.	"One Hour Mama"	Porter Grainger	Rhiannon Giddens	3:06
4.	"Mal Hombre"	Lydia Mendoza	Ana Gabriel	3:35
5.	"El Cascabel"	Lorenzo Barcelata	Los Lobos	2:24
Total length:				14:16

==== Side three ====
No.	Title	Writer(s)	Artist	Length
1.	"Closer Walk With Thee"	Traditional	The Avett Brothers	3:28
2.	"Fourteen Rivers, Fourteen Floods"	Beck Hansen	Beck	2:41
3.	"Nobody's Dirty Business"	Frank Stokes	Bettye LaVette	2:15
4.	"St. Louis Blues"	W.C. Handy	Pokey Lafarge	3:30
5.	"High Water Everywhere, Part 2"	Charley Patton	Taj Mahal	3:12
Total length:				15:06

==== Side four ====
No.	Title	Writer(s)	Artist	Length
1.	"One Mic"	Nasir Jones, Chucky Thompson	Nas	3:18
2.	"Pretty Saro"	Traditional	Rhiannon Giddens	2:41
3.	"Jubilee"	Jean Ritchie	Ashley Monroe and The Americans	2:43
4.	"Tous les Matins"	Louis Michot	The Lost Bayou Ramblers	2:46
5.	"When I Woke Up this Morning"	Jim Jackson	Bettye LaVette	2:29
Total length:				16:02

==== Side five ====
No.	Title	Writer(s)	Artist	Length
1.	"Stealin Stealin"	Will Shade	Raphael Saadiq	2:40
2.	"Jordan am a Hard Road to Travel"	Daniel Emmett	The Avett Brothers	2:47
3.	"Sail Away Ladies"	Traditional	The Americans	2:04
4.	"Tomi Tomi"	Traditional	The Hawaiians	2:29
5.	"Last Kind Words"	Geeshie Wiley	Christine Pizzuti	2:50
Total length:				12:50

==== Side six ====
No.	Title	Writer(s)	Artist	Length
1.	"Come On In My Kitchen"	Robert Johnson	Stephen Stills	2:21
2.	"Mama's Angel Child"	Sweet Papa Stovepipe	Jack White	3:01
3.	"Josephine"	Pokey LaFarge	Pokey LaFarge	3:12
4.	"Hilo Hanakahi"	Keola Nalium	The Hawaiians	3:44
5.	"Old Fashioned Love"	James P. Johnson, Cecil Mack	Willie Nelson and Merle Haggard	2:41
Total length:				14:59

=== Standard edition digital ===
No.	Title	Writer(s)	Artist	Length
1.	"Killer Diller"	Memphis Minnie	Alabama Shakes	2:12
2.	"On The Road Again"	J.B. Jones and Will Shade	Nas	2:00
3.	"Candy Man"	Rev. Gary Davis	Jerron "Blind Boy" Paxton	2:53
4.	"2 Fingers Of Whiskey"	Elton John and Bernie Taupin	Elton John and Jack White	2:52
5.	"The Coo Coo Bird"	Traditional	Steve Martin and Edie Brickell	3:19
6.	"Like A Rose"	Ashley Monroe, Guy Clark, Jon Randall	Ashley Monroe	3:06
7.	"The Only Man Wilder Than Me"	Merle Haggard	Willie Nelson & Merle Haggard	2:03
8.	"Matrimonial Intentions"	Traditional	Jack White	3:08
9.	"One Hour Mama"	Porter Grainger	Rhiannon Giddens	3:06
10.	"Mal Hombre"	Lydia Mendoza	Ana Gabriel	3:35
11.	"El Cascabel"	Lorenzo Barcelata	Los Lobos	2:24
12.	"Closer Walk With Thee"	Traditional	The Avett Brothers	3:28
13.	"Fourteen Rivers, Fourteen Floods"	Beck Hansen	Beck	2:41
Total length:				34:47

== Performers ==
=== Groups ===
==== Alabama Shakes ====
- Zac Cockrell - Bass
- Heath Fogg - Guitar
- Brittany Howard - Vocals, Guitar
- Steve Johnson - Drums
- Ben Tanner - Piano

==== The Americans ====
- Tim Carr - Steel Guitar
- Jake Faulkner - Upright Bass
- Patrick Ferris - Guitar
- Zac Sokolow - Mandolin

==== The Avett Brothers ====
- Scott Avett - Vocals, Banjo
- Seth Avett - Vocals, Acoustc guitar
- Bob Crawford - Upright Bass
- Joe Kwon - Cello

==== Beck ====
- Beck Hansen - Vocals And Guitar
- Roger Manning - Piano
- Emanuel Bennet - Vocals
- Jennifer M. Brown - Vocals
- Claire Hafteck - Vocals
- Shana May Jackson - Vocals
- Michelle Jones - Vocals
- Fred Martin - Musical Director
- Dwanna Orange - Vocals
- Tai Phillips - Vocals
- Kevin Shannon - Vocals
- Ari Sorko-Ram - Vocals
- Fawn Sorko-Ram - Vocals
- Marc Sorko-Ram - Vocals

==== Frank Fairfield ====
- Frank Fairfield - Vocals, Slide Guitar

==== Ana Gabriel ====
- Jay Bellerose - Drums
- Ana Gabriel - Vocals
- Van Dyke Parks - Accordion
- Omar Rodríguez-López - Guitar
- Gabe Witcher - Fiddle

==== Rhiannon Giddens ====
- Rhiannon Giddens - Vocals
- Hubby Jenkins - Banjo

==== The Hawaiians ====
- Dom Flemons - Guitar, Backup Vocals, Bones
- Bobby Ingano - Lap Steel
- Auntie Geri Kuhia - Vocals
- Charlie Kaleo Oyama - Vocals
- Fred Sokolow - Lap Steel

==== Elton John ====
- Elton John - Vocals, Piano

==== Pokey Lafarge ====
- Chloe Feoranzo - Clarinet
- Joseph Glynn - Upright Bass
- Adam Hoskins - Guitar
- Ryan Koenig - Percussion
- Pokey LaFarge - Vocals, Guitar
- Matthew Meyer - Drums
- TJ Muller - Cornet

==== Bettye LaVette ====
- Bettye LaVette - Vocals

==== Los Lobos ====
- David Hidalgo - Vocals, Requinto Jarocho
- Conrad Lozano - Vocals, Guitarron
- Louie Pérez - Vocals, Jarana
- Cesar Rosas - Vocals, Guitar

==== Lost Bayou Ramblers ====
- Robert Carruth - Guitar
- Eric Heigle – Drums
- André Michot - Accordion
- Louis Michot - Vocals, Fiddle

==== Taj Mahal ====
- Taj Mahal - Vocals, Ukelele

==== Steve Martin & Edie Brickell ====
- Edie Brickell - Vocals
- Steve Martin - Banjo

==== Ashley Monroe ====
- Ashley Monroe - Vocals, guitar

==== Nas ====
- Nas - Vocals

==== Willie Nelson and Merle Haggard ====
- Merle Haggard - Vocals, Guitar
- Willie Nelson - Vocals, Guitar

==== Jerron "Blind Boy" Paxton ====
- Jerron "Blind Boy" Paxton - Vocals, Guitar

==== Christine Pizutti ====
- Christine Pizutti - Vocals, Guitar

==== Raphael Saadiq ====
- Raphael Saadiq - Vocals

==== Stephen Stills ====
- Stephen Stills - Vocals, Guitar

==== Jack White ====
- Carla Azar - Percussion
- Dominic Davis - Upright Bass
- Fats Kaplin - Mandolin
- Lillie Mae Rische - Vocals, Fiddle
- Jack White - Vocals, Guitar

=== Other musicians ===
- Daru Jones - Drums
- Alfredo Ortiz - Drums
- Joshua Smith - Guitar

== Production personnel ==
- Nicholas Bergh - Engineer, transfers, mastering
- Jack White - producer
- T Bone Burnett - producer
- Bernard MacMahon - producer
- Allison McGourty- conceived by, executive producer, music supervisor
- Duke Erikson - restoration, mastering, producer
- John Polito - mastering
- Ellis Burman - mastering
- Patrick Ferris - associate producer
- Jack McLean - associate producer
- Nat Strimpopulos: artwork
