= American Epic: The Best of The Carter Family =

Compilation album by The Carter Family
- Released: June 16, 2017
- Recorded: 1927–1933
- Genre: Country; folk; Americana
- Length: 45:17
- Label: Lo-Max; Sony Legacy; Third Man

American Epic chronology
American Epic: The Best of Mississippi John Hurt (2017)	American Epic: The Best of The Carter Family (2017)	American Epic: The Best of Lead Belly (2017)

American Epic: The Best of The Carter Family is a compilation of Carter Family songs recorded between 1927 and 1933 and released in 2017 to accompany the award-winning American Epic documentary film series. The album was released as a 15-track download and a vinyl LP.

== Background ==
During the pre-production of the American Epic films, film director Bernard MacMahon and producers and co-writers Duke Erikson and Allison McGourty created a series of compilation album releases exploring the music of some of the performers featured in the documentaries. MacMahon stated that "the Carter Family's story is central to the whole notion of country music, and it has been told in many ways, but we were particularly interested in them because so much of early country music was recorded by male artists, and to us the Carter Family is very much a female group." MacMahon opened the film with the Carter Family's story showing how they were one of the most important country acts discovered at the legendary Bristol Sessions in 1927. The Bristol recording sessions are widely regarded as "the Big Bang of country music." A significant motivation for releasing the album was the sonic breakthrough that the American Epic film sound department had made in transferring and restoring the old shellac 78rpm discs for the film's soundtrack.

== Compilation ==
The album collects performances from the Carter Family's recording sessions for Victor Records and Bluebird Records between 1927 and 1933. It includes three of their first commercial recordings for Ralph Peer at the Bristol Sessions, "The Wandering Boy", "The Poor Orphan Child" and "Bury Me Under the Weeping Willow". It features songs about historical events like "Engine One-Forty-Three" about the train wreck of Chesapeake and Ohio Railway's Fast Flying Virginian near Hinton, West Virginia on 23 October 1890 and "John Hardy Was a Desperate Little Man" about the hanging of a railroad worker, John Hardy, on January 19, 1894, after he shot Thomas Drews over a dispute in a craps game in Keystone, West Virginia in 1893. The album includes songs that would be covered by many subsequent acts and have become country music standards like "Wildwood Flower" and "Keep on The Sunny Side". The compilation also contains religious songs in the band's early repertoire like "When the World's on Fire" along with blues numbers like "Worried Man Blues" as well as Appalachian ballads like "Lonesome Valley", "The Foggy Mountain Top" and "Sweet Fern". All the songs are credited as being written by A.P. Carter who searched for material on frequent song hunting trips throughout the Appalachians where he uncovered and adapted old folk songs, although Sara Carter stated in a 1978 interview that she and Maybelle Carter were also responsible for finding many of their early songs in their recorded repertoire.

== Restoration ==
New sound restoration techniques developed for the American Epic film series were utilized to restore the fifteen recordings on the album. The 78rpm record transfers were made by sound engineer Nicholas Bergh using reverse engineering techniques garnered from working with the restored first electrical sound recording system from the 1920s in The American Epic Sessions. This was followed by meticulous sound restoration on these 1920s recordings, by sound engineers Peter Henderson and Joel Tefteller, to reveal greater fidelity, presence, and clarity than had been heard before. Some of the recordings were repressed from the original metal parts, which the audio team located whilst researching the films. Henderson explained, "in some cases we were lucky enough to get some metal parts – that's the originals where they were cut to wax and the metal was put into the grooves and the discs were printed from those back in the '20s. Some of those still exist – Sony had some of them in their vaults."

== Release ==
The album was released on June 16, 2017, one month after the US broadcast of American Epic: The Big Bang, the first film in the American Epic series, which included the Carter Family's story. The album was issued as a download by Sony Legacy and a vinyl LP by Third Man Records.

== Critical reception ==
The album was described by The Village Voice as featuring "re-mastering I can only call profound. Performances you might think you knew sound as if you've never heard them before — never apprehended them." Ian Anderson reviewing the work in fRoots added, "you haven't really heard these tracks at all. Not like this. Forget bad dubs of worn-out 78s pressed on poor vinyl. The 'reverse engineering' transfers by Nicholas Bergh and subsequent restorations are so startlingly better, practically everything you will ever have experienced from this era can be discounted and CD is the best way to hear them. The clarity of group recordings where every instrument is well defined, and their instruments and voices suddenly sound real, will have you on the edge of your seat. And there's none of that fog of 78 surface noise which many people find too much of a distraction: suddenly, legendary artists are in the room with you."

== Track listing ==
All tracks are written by A.P. Carter.

No.	Title	Original Release	Length
1.	"Lonesome Valley"	Victor 23541, 1930	2:41
2.	"The Poor Orphan Child"	Victor 20877, 1927	3:27
3.	"Bury Me Under the Weeping Willow"	Victor 21074, 1927	2:59
4.	"The Wandering Boy"	Victor 20877, 1927	3:22
5.	"Wildwood Flower"	Victor V-40000, 1928	3:11
6.	"The Foggy Mountain Top"	Victor V-40058, 1929	3:04
7.	"The Cannonball"	Victor V-40317, 1930	3:00
8.	"Worried Man Blues"	Victor V-40317, 1930	2:46
9.	"Engine One-Forty-Three"	Victor V-40089, 1929	3:17
10.	"Keep On the Sunny Side"	Victor 21434, 1928	2:52
11.	"Sweet Fern"	Victor V-40126, 1929	3:08
12.	"John Hardy Was a Desperate Little Man"	Victor V-40190, 1928	2:57
13.	"Anchored in Love"	Victor V-40036, 1928	2:46
14.	"I Will Never Marry"	Bluebird 8350, 1933	2:39
15.	"When the World's on Fire"	Victor V-40293, 1930	3:08
Total length:			45:17

== Personnel ==
- Sara Carter – vocals, autoharp
- Maybelle Carter – vocals, guitar
- A.P. Carter – vocals
- Bernard MacMahon - editor, compiler, producer
- Nicholas Bergh - 78 rpm transfers, mastering
- Peter Henderson - restoration, mastering, producer
- Duke Erikson - restoration, mastering, producer
- Joel Tefteller - restoration, mastering, compiler
- John Polito - mastering
- Ellis Burman - mastering
- Allison McGourty - producer
- Adam Block - producer
- Patrick Ferris - associate producer
- Jack McLean - associate producer
- Nat Strimpopulos: artwork
