= American Epic: The Best of Lead Belly =

Compilation album by Lead Belly
- Released: June 16, 2017
- Recorded: 1935
- Genres: Folk; Country blues
- Length: 42:18
- Labels: Lo-Max; Sony Legacy; Third Man

American Epic chronology
American Epic: The Best of The Carter Family (2017)	American Epic: The Best of Lead Belly (2017)	American Epic: The Best of Blind Willie Johnson (2017)

American Epic: The Best of Lead Belly is a compilation of Lead Belly's first commercial recordings made in 1935 and released in 2017 to accompany the award-winning American Epic documentary film series. The album was released as a 14-track download and a vinyl LP.

== Background ==
During the production of the American Epic films, the sound department gained access to two collections of rare test pressings of Lead Belly's first professional recording sessions from 1935. Although Lead Belly was ultimately not featured in the final cut of the films, it was decided that these recordings were of such historical importance that they merited being transferred and restored using the new restoration techniques the American Epic film sound department had made in transferring and restoring the old shellac 78rpm discs for the film's soundtrack.

== Compilation ==
In January 1935, country music singer Tex Ritter introduced Lead Belly and his manager John Lomax to Art Satherley, a record producer and A&R man for the American Record Corporation (ARC). Between January and March 1935, Lead Belly recorded over forty songs for Satherley at the ARC studio at 1776 Broadway, New York. Only six of these titles were released at the time. The album collects fourteen of the unissued performances transferred from the test pressings made at the sessions. It includes autobiographical songs, like "Mr. Tom Hughes Town", in which Lead Belly recalls his teenage desire to visit the red-light district of Shreveport, Louisiana where Thomas Roland Hughes was the sheriff. In Lead Belly's 1936 biography the song was described as "the saddest and gayest of all Lead Belly's songs. It is his own ballad and his own estimate of the most important conflict of his life. He prophesies his destiny and at the same time accepts and defies it. The melody is that of a vulgar red-light song. The accompaniment is the swiftest, most intricate and exciting of his entire repertoire". The album includes 12-bar blues songs like "C.C. Rider", originally written and recorded by Ma Rainey and "Matchbox Blues" which was recorded in 1927 by his friend and busking partner Blind Lemon Jefferson and was subsequently recorded by Carl Perkins and The Beatles. It also features adaptations of 19th century Tin Pan Alley songs like "You Can't Lose Me, Charlie" by Harry S. Miller along with traditional folk songs like "Bull Cow" and "Shorty George", farming songs like "Ox Drivin' Blues" and romantic laments like "My Baby Quit Me" and "Baby Don't You Love Me No More". The performances constitute the earliest commercial recordings of one of the most important artists in the folk/blues genre.

== Restoration ==
New sound restoration techniques developed for the American Epic film series were utilized to restore the fourteen recordings on the album. The 78rpm record transfers were made by sound engineer Nicholas Bergh using reverse engineering techniques garnered from working with the restored first electrical sound recording system from the 1920s in The American Epic Sessions. This was followed by meticulous sound restoration on these 1920s recordings, by sound engineers Peter Henderson and Joel Tefteller, to reveal greater fidelity, presence, and clarity than had been heard before.

== Release ==
The album was released on June 16, 2017, one month after the US broadcast of American Epic. The album was issued as a download by Sony Legacy and a vinyl LP by Third Man Records.

== Critical reception ==
The Village Voice described the sound as "re-mastering I can only call profound. Performances you might think you knew sound as if you've never heard them before — never apprehended them." Ian Anderson in fRoots said "you haven't really heard these tracks at all. Not like this. Forget bad dubs of worn-out 78s pressed on poor vinyl. The 'reverse engineering' transfers by Nicholas Bergh and subsequent restorations are so startlingly better, practically everything you will ever have experienced from this era can be discounted. And there's none of that fog of 78 surface noise which many people find too much of a distraction: suddenly, legendary artists are in the room with you."

== Track listing ==
No.	Title	Original Recording	Length
1.	"Mr. Tom Hughes' Town"	ARC unissued, Feb 5, 1935	3:08
2.	"C.C. Rider"	ARC unissued, Jan 23, 1935	3:02
3.	"You Can't Lose Me, Charlie"	ARC unissued, Jan 23, 1935	3:02
4.	"Kansas City Papa"	ARC unissued, Jan 24, 1935	2:53
5.	"Death Letter Blues, Part 1"	ARC unissued, Jan 24, 1935	3:05
6.	"Death Letter Blues, Part 2"	ARC unissued, Jan 24, 1935	3:04
7.	"Fort Worth and Dallas Blues"	ARC unissued, Jan 24, 1935	3:00
8.	"Bull Cow"	ARC unissued, Mar 25, 1935	2:47
9.	"Ox Drivin' Blues"	ARC unissued, Jan 24, 1935	2:57
10.	"Shorty George"	ARC unissued, Feb 5, 1935	3:09
11.	"You Don't Know My Mind"	ARC unissued, Jan 23, 1935	3:05
12.	"Matchbox Blues"	ARC unissued, Feb 5, 1935	3:07
13.	"My Baby Quit Me"	ARC unissued, Mar 25, 1935	2:57
14.	"Baby Don't You Love Me No More"	ARC unissued, Jan 24, 1935	2:56
Total length:			42:18

== Personnel ==
- Lead Belly - vocals and guitar
- Bernard MacMahon - editor, compiler, producer
- Nicholas Bergh - 78 rpm transfers, mastering
- Peter Henderson - restoration, mastering, producer
- Duke Erikson - restoration, mastering, producer
- Joel Tefteller - restoration, mastering, compiler
- John Polito - mastering
- Ellis Burman - mastering
- Allison McGourty - producer
- Adam Block - producer
- Patrick Ferris - associate producer
- Jack McLean - associate producer
- Nat Strimpopulos - artwork
