= American Epic: The Best of Mississippi John Hurt =

Compilation album by Mississippi John Hurt
- Released: June 16, 2017
- Recorded: 1928
- Genres: folk, blues
- Length: 38:41
- Labels: Lo-Max, Sony Legacy, Third Man

American Epic chronology
American Epic: The Best of Country (2017)	American Epic: The Best of Mississippi John Hurt (2017)	American Epic: The Best of The Carter Family (2017)

American Epic: The Best of Mississippi John Hurt is a compilation album released to accompany the American Epic documentary films in 2017. It collects all the surviving performances from Mississippi John Hurt's first two recording sessions for OKeh Records in Memphis and New York City in 1928. The performances are cited as some of the greatest recordings of the 1920s.

== Background ==
During the pre-production of the American Epic films, film director Bernard MacMahon and producers and co-writers Allison McGourty and Duke Erikson created a series of compilation album releases exploring the music of some of the performers featured in the documentaries. MacMahon stated that "John Hurt was the inspiration for American Epic," explaining that "when I began this project, I knew from the start that John Hurt had to be part of it, because I believe his music can connect with a new audience as profoundly as it did with me." MacMahon devoted the penultimate chapter of the documentary series to the life of the county blues singer and guitarist. A significant motivation for releasing the album was the breakthrough that the American Epic film sound department had made in transferring and restoring the old shellac 78rpm discs for the film's soundtrack.

== Compilation ==
The album collected Hurt's first recordings "Frankie" and "Nobody's Dirty Business" made in February 1928 in Memphis after his discovery by Okeh Records scout Tommy Rockwell. The other 6 recordings from that Memphis session have never been found. It also collected all ten commercially released performances from his second and final session in New York from December 1928, plus an unreleased track "Big Leg Blues". The album featured murder ballads like "Frankie", "Louis Collins" and "Stack O'Lee Blues", work songs like "Spike Driver Blues", blues standards like "Ain't No Tellin'", gospel songs like "Praying on The Old Camp Ground" and "Blessed Be the Name", and sexual innuendos like "Candy Man". Included on the album is one of the songs Hurt wrote during the winter New York sessions - a homesick paean to his Mississippi hometown "Avalon Blues". The rediscovery in 1963 of this long-lost record led musicologist Dick Spottswood to locate Avalon in an atlas, resulting in Hurt's rediscovery and subsequent booking at the 1963 Newport Folk Festival, and a new recording contract with Vanguard Records, which brought his music to a global audience in the last three years of his life.

== Restoration ==
New sound restoration techniques developed for the American Epic film series were utilized to restore the thirteen 1928 recordings on the album. The 78rpm record transfers were made by sound engineer Nicholas Bergh using reverse engineering techniques garnered from working with the restored first electrical sound recording system from the 1920s in The American Epic Sessions. This was followed by exacting sound restoration on these 1920s recordings, by sound engineers Peter Henderson and Joel Tefteller, to reveal greater fidelity, presence, and clarity than had been heard before.

== Release ==
The album was released on June 16, 2017, seventeen days after the US broadcast of American Epic: Out of the Many, the One, the third film in the American Epic series, which included John Hurt's story. The album was issued as a download by Sony Legacy and a vinyl LP by Third Man Records.

== Critical reception ==
The restoration work on the album was described by Greil Marcus in The Village Voice as "re-mastering I can only call profound. Performances you might think you knew sound as if you've never heard them before — never apprehended them." Ian Anderson in fRoots said "you haven't really heard these tracks at all. Not like this. Forget bad dubs of worn-out 78s pressed on poor vinyl. The 'reverse engineering' transfers by Nicholas Bergh and subsequent restorations are so startlingly better, practically everything you will ever have experienced from this era can be discounted. And there's none of that fog of 78 surface noise which many people find too much of a distraction: suddenly, legendary artists are in the room with you."

== Track listing ==
All tracks are written by Mississippi John Hurt.

No.	Title	Original Release	Length
1.	"Frankie"	OKeh 8560, Feb 1928	3:28
2.	"Ain't No Tellin'"	OKeh 8759, Dec 1928	2:58
3.	"Spike Driver Blues"	OKeh 8692, Dec 1928	3:16
4.	"Avalon Blues"	OKeh 8759, Dec 1928	3:05
5.	"Louis Collins"	OKeh 8724, Dec 1928	3:01
6.	"Candy Man Blues"	OKeh 8654, Dec 1928	2:48
7.	"Stack O'Lee Blues"	OKeh 8654, Dec 1928	2:59
8.	"Praying on The Old Camp Ground"	OKeh 8666, Dec 1928	2:39
9.	"Blue Harvest Blues"	OKeh 8692, Dec 1928	2:55
10.	"Got the Blues, Can't Be Satisfied"	OKeh 8724, Dec 1928	2:54
11.	"Big Leg Blues"	unissued, Dec 1928	2:54
12.	"Nobody's Dirty Business"	OKeh 8560, Feb 1928	2:56
13.	"Blessed Be the Name"	OKeh 8666, Dec 1928	2:48
Total length:			38:41

== Personnel ==
- Mississippi John Hurt - vocals and guitar
- Bernard MacMahon - editor, compiler, producer
- Nicholas Bergh - 78 rpm transfers, mastering
- Peter Henderson - restoration, mastering, producer
- Duke Erikson - restoration, mastering, producer
- Joel Tefteller - restoration, mastering
- John Polito - mastering
- Ellis Burman - mastering
- Allison McGourty - producer
- Adam Block - producer
- Patrick Ferris - associate producer
- Jack McLean - associate producer
- Nat Strimpopulos - artwork
