= American Epic =

Documentary media franchise

- The American Epic logo
- Created by: Bernard MacMahon; Allison McGourty; Duke Erikson

Print publications
- Book: American Epic: The First Time America Heard Itself

Films and television
- Films: American Epic: The Big Bang; American Epic: Blood and Soil; American Epic: Out of the Many, the One; The American Epic Sessions

Audio
- Soundtracks: American Epic: The Collection; American Epic: The Soundtrack; Music from The American Epic Sessions; American Epic: The Best of Blues; American Epic: The Best of Country; American Epic: The Best of Mississippi John Hurt; American Epic: The Best of The Carter Family; American Epic: The Best of Lead Belly; American Epic: The Best of Blind Willie Johnson; American Epic: The Best of the Memphis Jug Band

Miscellaneous
- Schools: Educational program

American Epic is a documentary media franchise based upon the first recordings of roots music in the United States during the 1920s and their cultural, social and technological impact on North America and the world. The franchise comprises a three-part award-winning documentary film series directed by Bernard MacMahon, a feature-length musical documentary film, a book, ten album releases and an educational program. American Epic is widely considered as the definitive portrait of the musical era, and one of the best music documentaries ever made.

The American Epic documentary series was first broadcast May 16–30, 2017 on the BBC in the United Kingdom and on PBS in the US. The story is told through twelve ethnically and musically diverse musicians who auditioned for and participated in these pioneering recording sessions; The Carter Family, the Memphis Jug Band, Elder J.E. Burch, The Williamson Brothers, Dick Justice, Charley Patton, The Hopi Indian Chanters, Joseph Kekuku, Lydia Mendoza, the Breaux Family, Mississippi John Hurt, and Blind Willie Johnson.

The American Epic Sessions was first broadcast on June 6, 2017. It is a documentary film in which an engineer restores the fabled long-lost first electrical sound recording system from 1925, and twenty contemporary artists pay tribute to the momentous machine by attempting to record songs on it for the first time in 80 years. The film was directed and co-written by Bernard MacMahon and stars Nas, Alabama Shakes, Elton John, Willie Nelson, Merle Haggard, Jack White, Taj Mahal, Ana Gabriel, Pokey LaFarge, Beck, Ashley Monroe, and Steve Martin.

A book, American Epic: The First Time America Heard Itself was published on May 2, 2017. It was collaborative memoir written by film director Bernard MacMahon, producer Allison McGourty, and music historian Elijah Wald, chronicling the 10-year odyssey researching and making the American Epic documentary series and The American Epic Sessions films.

American Epic: The Collection was released on May 12, 2017 - a 5 CD box set of 100 songs featuring one track by each of the hundred artists researched as potential subjects for the American Epic films. On the same day American Epic: The Soundtrack was released compiling 14 vintage and 1 contemporary performance featured in the American Epic documentaries.

On June 9, 2017, Music from The American Epic Sessions was released, featuring contemporary artists recording live on the restored first electrical sound recording system from the 1920s. The 2 CD, triple vinyl album contained 32 performances recorded for The American Epic Sessions film.

On June 16, 2017, a series of compilations were released of artists featured in the American Epic documentary films. The albums were American Epic: The Best of Mississippi John Hurt, American Epic: The Best of The Carter Family, American Epic: The Best of Blind Willie Johnson, American Epic: The Best of Memphis Jug Band along with American Epic: The Best of Lead Belly who was not featured in the film. These releases were accompanied by two genre compilations; American Epic: The Best of Blues and American Epic: The Best of Country. The albums were released as digital downloads with truncated versions issued on vinyl.

In the fall of 2017 an educational program based on the American Epic film series was launched at the University of Chicago Laboratory Schools.

== Documentary series ==
American Epic is a documentary film series about the first recordings of roots music in the United States during the 1920s and their cultural, social and technological impact on North America and the world. Directed and co-written by Bernard MacMahon, the story is told through twelve ethnically and musically diverse musicians who auditioned for and participated in these pioneering recording sessions; The Carter Family, the Memphis Jug Band, Elder J.E. Burch, The Williamson Brothers, Dick Justice, Charley Patton, The Hopi Indian Chanters, Joseph Kekuku, Lydia Mendoza, the Breaux Family, Mississippi John Hurt, and Blind Willie Johnson.

The film was the result of ten years of intensive field research and postulated a radically new take on American history, namely that America was democratized through the invention of electrical sound recording and the subsequent auditions the record labels held across North America in the late 1920s, which were open to every ethnic minority and genre of music. The films contained many previously untold stories, a vast amount of previously unseen and extremely rare archival footage and dramatically advanced audio restorations of the 1920s and 1930s recordings.

MacMahon decided all the interviewees had to personally have known the long-deceased subjects of the films and these interviews were conducted on location where the musicians had lived accompanied by panoramic tracking shots of the geographical locations both present and vintage to give a sense of the wildly varied North American landscape and its influence on the music. During pre-production, when MacMahon presented his vision for the films and the archival footage to Robert Redford at their first meeting, Redford pronounced it "America's greatest untold story."

The film series received a number of awards, including the Foxtel Audience Award at the 2016 Sydney Film Festival, the Discovery Award at the 2016 Calgary International Film Festival, and was nominated for a Primetime Emmy. On April 23, 2018, the Focal International Awards nominated American Epic for Best Use of Footage in a History Feature and Best Use of Footage in a Music Production. Many critics have cited the American Epic films as being one of the best music documentaries ever made.

Air dates on PBS:

- American Epic: The Big Bang - May 16, 2017: 9–10 p.m.
- American Epic: Blood and Soil - May 23, 2017: 9–10 p.m.
- American Epic: Out of the Many, The One - May 30, 2017: 9–10:30 p.m.

== The American Epic Sessions ==
The American Epic Sessions is a documentary film in which an engineer restores the long-lost first electrical sound recording system on which the 1920s field recording sessions were made, and twenty contemporary artists pay tribute to the momentous machine by attempting to record songs on it for the first time in 80 years. The film was directed and co-written by Bernard MacMahon and stars Nas, Alabama Shakes, Elton John, Willie Nelson, Merle Haggard, Jack White, Taj Mahal, Ana Gabriel, Pokey LaFarge, Beck, Ashley Monroe and Steve Martin.

The film employed a diverse line-up of performers, both ethnically and musically, to represent the breadth of cultures that were first given a national platform through the invention of this recording machine. It also explored the extent to which the recordings made on it in the 1920s influenced and inspired contemporary music.

The film involved a decade of work restoring the machine, which was pieced together from spare parts scattered across the globe, in order to better understand the origins of modern recording technology, and the influence the machine had on world culture. The machine would go on to put sound on talking pictures. Prior to the release of The American Epic Sessions, the recording system was mysterious and had not been seen in almost 80 years. Engineer Nicholas Bergh who reassembled and restored the machine explained, "I had two mentors when I was getting into audio who started their careers in the late 1930s in America and both of them told me that even by the late '30s this system was basically mythical and they had never seen any components of it or even pictures. So even in ten years it had basically disappeared off the face of the earth."

The recreation of a live 1920s-style recording session in the film explored the essence of what makes a great recorded performance.

The film received widespread acclaim for its direction, musical performances, sound and cinematography. The film won the Discovery Award and the Audience Award at the Calgary International Film Festival, was nominated for a Primetime Emmy Award, Bernard MacMahon and Allison McGourty were nominated as Breakthrough Talents by the British Academy Film Awards and the film won a Grammy Award for the Alabama Shakes performance of "Killer Diller Blues".

Air date on PBS:

- Tuesday, June 6, 2017: 8–11 p.m.

== Book ==
American Epic: The First Time America Heard Itself is a collaborative memoir written by film director Bernard MacMahon, producer Allison McGourty, and music historian Elijah Wald. The book chronicles the 10-year odyssey researching and making the American Epic films. It features interviews with subjects of the films and contains supplementary information and photographs not featured in the documentary films or the music releases. The book and an audiobook was released on May 2, 2017.

The book was the winner of the 2017 Association for Recorded Sound Collections Award.

== Soundtrack and albums ==
The American Epic films were accompanied by 10 music releases. These included American Epic: The Collection - a 5-CD box set of 100 songs featuring one track by each of the hundred artists researched as potential subjects for the American Epic films. American Epic: The Soundtrack which released featured performances from the American Epic documentaries. Music from The American Epic Sessions featured contemporary artists recording live on the restored first electrical sound recording system from the 1920s. The album contained 32 performances recorded for The American Epic Sessions film. A series of compilations were released of artists featured in the American Epic documentary films. The albums were: American Epic: The Best of Mississippi John Hurt, American Epic: The Best of The Carter Family, American Epic: The Best of Blind Willie Johnson, American Epic: The Best of the Memphis Jug Band along with American Epic: The Best of Lead Belly who was not featured in the film series. These releases were accompanied by two genre compilations: American Epic: The Best of Blues and American Epic: The Best of Country. The Best Of albums were released as digital downloads with truncated versions issued on vinyl.

New sound restoration techniques developed for the American Epic film production were utilized to restore the songs on the albums. The 78 rpm disc transfers were made by sound engineer Nicholas Bergh using reverse engineering techniques, garnered from working with the original 1920s recording equipment on The American Epic Sessions, along with meticulous sound restoration undertaken by Peter Henderson and Joel Tefteller to reveal greater fidelity, presence, and clarity to these 1920s and 30s recordings than had ever been heard before. Nicholas Bergh commented, "the recordings in this set are special since they utilize the earliest and simplest type of electric recording equipment used for commercial studio work. As a result, they have an unrivaled immediacy to the sound."

Some of the recordings were repressed from the original metal parts, which the production located whilst researching the films. Peter Henderson explained "in some cases we were lucky enough to get some metal parts – that's the originals where they were cut to wax and the metal was put into the grooves and the discs were printed from those back in the '20s. Some of those still exist – Sony had some of them in their vaults." The releases won particular acclaim for the song selection and the sound quality of the transfers of vintage 78rpm records.

== Educational program ==
In September 2017 the University of Chicago Laboratory Schools announced a nine-month preschool to high school educational program based on the American Epic films beginning on October 6, 2017. The school, founded by American educator John Dewey in 1896, has over 2,015 students enrolled in 15 grades. Lab Board Chair David Kistenbroker stated "the program is designed to further Lab's mission by bringing practicing artists to campus, in various capacities, to work directly with Lab students." The program featured director of the film Bernard MacMahon and producer and co-writer Allison McGourty as Artists-in-Residence. "The artist in residence concept—successfully tested in other ways at Lab—has the potential to ignite creativity in entirely new and unexpected ways," said Mr. Kistenbroker. "By working side-by-side with leading artistic practitioners, our students and our faculty benefit. It is absolutely consistent with how John Dewey envisioned a community of learners."
