= Prince Albert Hunt =

American country blues fiddle player from Denton, Texas

- Born: Archie Albert Hunt; December 20, 1896; Terrell, Texas, U.S.
- Died: March 21, 1931 (aged 34) Dallas, Texas, U.S.
- Genres: Country blues
- Occupation: Musician
- Instruments: Vocal; Guitar; Fiddle

Archie "Prince" Albert Hunt (December 20, 1896 – March 21, 1931) from Terrell, Texas was an American country blues fiddle player. He was one of the founders of the musical genre later defined as Western swing.

Hunt was born as Archie Albert Hunt in Terrell, Texas to Archibald Hunt and Manasa Emma Lee Skates. As a child, he learned to play the fiddle by stealing his father's instrument and self-teaching himself in a nearby graveyard. Though much of Hunt's personal life is obscure, it is known he served in the First World War, and his first professional work as a musician was as a member of a traveling minstrel show, in the early 1920s. On March 28, 1928, Hunt and his group, the Texas Ramblers, which included violinist Harmon Clem and an unknown guitarist, recorded in San Antonio for Okeh Records. Of the sides the group laid down, "Blues in the Bottle" was arguably his most accomplished for its diverse assortment of country blues, ragtime and old-time music. It was later included in Rich Nevins' compilation album, Times Ain’t Like They Used to Be, Volume 1 along with other contemporaries.

In addition to being a recording artist, Hunt regularly performed on local radio stations and venues, usually in blackface, with his neighbors Doc and Oscar Harper. Hunt particularly favored the neighborhood known as Deep Ellum, which was also frequented by other blues musicians, but notorious for its red-light district. On June 26, 1929, Hunt and the Texas Ramblers recorded for the last time, with the session taking place in Dallas. Among the six songs recorded was "Wake Up, Jacob" which was featured on the renowned compilation created by Harry Everett Smith, Anthology of American Folk Music, in 1952. An unknown composition was cut, but was either never released or no original copies exist. The song, "Oklahoma Rag" was released as under Prince Albert Hunt and Hermon Clem. The recordings were later seen as a primary influence in Western swing and country music in general.

On 31 March 1931 Hunt was shot to death outside Confederate Hall. His assailant, William M. Douglas, reported that he murdered Hunt out of jealousy for dancing with his wife. In 1974, a documentary titled Memories of Prince Albert Hunt was released and was centered on the musician's life.
