= Mattie Delaney =

American singer

- Born: possible Mattie Doyle, or Mattie B. Delaney c. 1905; Mississippi, U.S.
- Died: after 1930
- Genres: Delta blues
- Occupations: Musician; Singer-songwriter
- Instruments: Vocals; Guitar
- Years active: 1927 – 1930
- Label: Vocalion

Mattie Delaney (born c. 1905, fl. 1930) was an American Delta blues singer and guitarist active in the 1930s. Only two recordings by her are known: "Down the Big Road Blues" and "Tallahatchie River Blues".

== Career ==
Delaney may have been born Mattie Doyle south of Tchula, Mississippi, but the researchers Bob Eagle and Eric LeBlanc suggest she was Mattie B. Delaney, born near Goodman, Mississippi. Around 1927 she may have moved to Memphis, Tennessee. Contemporary witnesses remember seeing her perform at Swan Lake, Mississippi. She recorded two songs for Vocalion Records in February 1930. Her song "Down the Big Road Blues" was a variant of Tommy Johnson's "Big Road Blues". One music journalist noted "Delaney issuing a matter-of-fact report in 'Tallahatchie River Blues'". She was unusual for a female performer of the time, in that she played guitar accompaniment and sang topical songs. Nothing is known of her life after the recordings.

Two of Delaney's songs were included on the compilation album Mississippi Girls (1928–1931), issued in September 1991.

== See also ==
- List of blues musicians
