= American Epic: The First Time America Heard Itself =

Book by Bernard MacMahon

- First edition
- Author: Bernard MacMahon, Allison McGourty, Elijah Wald
- Language: English
- Genre: Memoir, autobiography
- Published: May 2, 2017
- Publisher: Simon & Schuster
- Publication place: United States
- Media type: Print
- Pages: 288
- ISBN: 978-1-5011-3560-6

American Epic: The First Time America Heard Itself is a collaborative memoir written by film director Bernard MacMahon, producer Allison McGourty, and music historian Elijah Wald. The book chronicles the 10-year odyssey researching and making the American Epic documentary series and The American Epic Sessions. It features interviews with subjects of the films and contains large amounts of supplementary information not featured in the documentary films or the music releases. The book and an audiobook were released on May 2, 2017.

American Epic: The First Time America Heard Itself is a collage of first person interviews with MacMahon, McGourty and their subjects edited by Grammy Award-winning music historian Elijah Wald.

The full color book contains 282 photographs; many of them previously unpublished restored vintage images, along with behind the scenes stills of the production and storyboard sketches by Bernard MacMahon.

The book was the winner of the 2017 Association for Recorded Sound Collections Award.

== Background ==
The book was written to reveal the detective work putting together the American Epic films which had aroused considerable interest at preliminary screenings. It also featured many stories that couldn’t be included in the films due to time constraints. It was written during the post production of the American Epic films and announced February 15, 2017.

== Synopsis ==
The book chronicles the 10-year odyssey researching and making the American Epic documentary series and The American Epic Sessions. The chapters approximately match the sections of the documentary series. It features interviews with subjects of the films and contains large amounts of supplementary information not featured in the documentary films or the music releases.

== Acclaim ==
The book has received widespread critical acclaim, Maik Brüggemeyer in Rolling Stone awarded it five stars and described it as “essential”, Ian Anderson in fRoots stated “the companion 280-page hardback book is a beauty with high production values allowing you to linger on the rich detail of all those historic photos that came up on screen as part of the series - it is wonderful to read.” Nigel Williamson in Songlines awarded the book five stars and stated that “the book makes a superb companion, chronicling the ten-year journey taken by the British-born MacMahon and his producer Allison McGourty across the US in search of the earliest roots of recorded American music. The book tells the story evocatively through archive photography, the reproduction of historical documents and the use of some gripping personal testimony.” The book was the winner of the 2017 Association for Recorded Sound Collections Award for Best Historical Research in Recorded Roots, Folk or World Music.
