= Hattie Hart =

American Memphis blues singer and songwriter (c. 1900 – after 1946)

- Also known as: probably Hattie Bolten
- Born: c. 1900; Memphis, Tennessee, United States
- Died: after 1946
- Genres: Memphis blues; Country blues
- Occupation: Singer-songwriter
- Instrument: Vocals
- Years active: 1920s–early 1930s
- Labels: Victor, Vocalion

Hattie Hart (c. 1900 - after 1946) was an American Memphis blues singer and songwriter. She was active as a recording artist from the late 1920s to the mid-1930s. Her best known tracks are "I Let My Daddy Do That" and "Coldest Stuff in Town". She worked as a solo artist and as a singer with the Memphis Jug Band. Little is known of her life outside music.

It was stated that "Hart wrote gritty songs about love, sex, cocaine and voodoo".

== Career ==
Hart was born in Memphis, Tennessee, around 1900. She first recorded with the Memphis Jug Band in 1928. She had a reputation for the parties that she hosted at this time. She also sang in the Beale Street area of Memphis, busking with various musicians, where she became one of the best-known performers. Hart's singing style has been compared to that of Sara Martin. She has been described as a "marvellous, tough voiced singer".

Her earliest recording with the Memphis Jug Band was a song she wrote, "Won't You Be Kind?" (1928), with blues dialect in the lyrics: "Now twenty-five cents a saucer, seventy-five cents a cup, But it's an extra dollar papa, if you mean to keep it up." Five recordings of Hart with the Jug Band between 1928 and 1930 are known to exist. She undertook a recording session of her own in September 1934, with Allen Shaw and one other musician, who some blues historians believe was Memphis Willie B. Hart recorded fourteen tracks for Vocalion Records, only four of which were released at the time.

Hart moved to Chicago, and it is believed she recorded there in 1938 under the name Hattie Bolten. It is not reported whether this was her married name or a pseudonym. After that, she disappeared from public attention, and no further details of her life are known.

Hart's song "I Let My Daddy Do That" was covered by Holly Golightly on her 1997 album Painted On.

== Recordings ==
Month/year	Track	Songwriter	Contributors	Record label
1928	"Won't You Be Kind?" (also known as "Won't You Be Kind to Me?")	Hattie Hart	Memphis Jug Band	Victor
1929	"Memphis Yo Yo Blues"	Jennie Pope (possibly Jennie Mae Clayton)	Memphis Jug Band	Victor
1930	"Cocaine Habit Blues"	Jennie Mae Clayton	Memphis Jug Band	Victor
1930	"Oh Ambulance Man"	Hattie Hart	Memphis Jug Band	Victor
June 1930	"Spider's Nest Blues"	Jennie Mae Clayton	Memphis Jug Band	Victor
June 1930	"Papa's Got Your Bath Water On"	Hattie Hart	Memphis Jug Band	Victor
	"You Wouldn't, Would You Papa"		Hattie Hart, others	
September 1934	"Coldest Stuff in Town"		Hattie Hart, Allen Shaw (duo); Memphis Willie B. (probably)	Vocalion
September 1934	"Happy-Go-Lucky-Blues"		Hattie Hart, Allen Shaw, Memphis Willie B. (probably)	Vocalion
September 1934	"I'm Missing That Thing"		Hattie Hart, Allen Shaw, Memphis Willie B. (probably)	Vocalion
September 1934	"I Let My Daddy Do That"	Hattie Hart	Hattie Hart, Allen Shaw, Memphis Willie B. (probably)	Vocalion
September 1934	"Down Home Shake"		Hattie Hart, Allen Shaw, Memphis Willie B. (probably)	Vocalion (unissued)
September 1934	"Runnin' Wild Blues"		Hattie Hart, Allen Shaw, Memphis Willie B. (probably)	Vocalion (unissued)
September 1934	"Mama, Easy Me Your Key"		Hattie Hart, Allen Shaw, Memphis Willie B. (probably)	Vocalion (unissued)
September 1934	"Lucky Some Day"		Hattie Hart, Allen Shaw, Memphis Willie B. (probably)	Vocalion (unissued)
September 1934	"Low Down Papa"		Hattie Hart, Allen Shaw, Memphis Willie B. (probably)	Vocalion (unissued)
September 1934	"Drop Down Papa"		Hattie Hart, Allen Shaw, Memphis Willie B. (probably)	Vocalion (unissued)
September 1934	"Didn't He Ramble"		Hattie Hart, Allen Shaw, Memphis Willie B. (probably)	Vocalion (unissued)
September 1934	"Country Farm Blues"		Hattie Hart, Allen Shaw, Memphis Willie B. (probably)	Vocalion (unissued)
September 1934	"Barrel House Mama"		Hattie Hart, Allen Shaw, Memphis Willie B. (probably)	Vocalion (unissued)
September 1934	"Home Breakin' Blues"		Hattie Hart, Allen Shaw, Memphis Willie B. (probably)	Vocalion (unissued)

== See also ==
- List of country blues musicians
