= Will Shade =

Background information
- Also known as: Son Brimmer
- Born: William Shade Jr. February 5, 1893; Memphis, Tennessee, United States
- Died: September 18, 1966 (aged 73) Memphis, Tennessee
- Genres: Memphis blues
- Instruments: Vocals, guitar, harmonica, bullfiddle (washtub bass)
- Years active: 1927–1966
- Labels: Victor Records (1927-1930); Champion-Gennett (1932); Okeh Records (1934)

William Shade Jr. (February 5, 1893 – September 18, 1966) was a Memphis blues musician, best known for his leadership of the Memphis Jug Band. He was commonly called Son Brimmer, a nickname from his grandmother Annie Brimmer (son is short for grandson). The name apparently stuck when other members of the band noticed that the sun bothered him and he used the brim of a hat to shade his eyes.

== Early life ==
Shade was born in February 1893 in Memphis, Tennessee, to William Shade and Mary (née Brimmer). Mary was fourteen years old when he was born. After her husband's death from a gunshot wound in 1903, she married a member of the Banks family, but by 1920 she was a widow once again. Shade had two half brothers, Henry Banks and Robert Banks. He credited his mother with teaching him how to play the harmonica, his first instrument.

== Biography ==
Shade first heard jug band music in 1925, recorded by the Dixieland Jug Blowers, from Louisville, Kentucky. He was excited by what he heard and felt that bringing this style of music to his hometown of Memphis could be promising. He persuaded a few local musicians, though still reluctant, to join him in creating one of the first jug bands in Memphis.

The original Memphis Jug Band consisted of Shade and three others: Lionhouse, whom Shade converted from a whiskey bottle blower to a jug blower; Tee Wee Blackman on guitar; and Ben Ramey on kazoo. Shade played the guitar, the "bullfiddle" (washtub bass), and the harmonica, the instrument on which he was most influential. His pure country blues harmonica style served as the foundation for later renowned harmonicists like Big Walter Horton, Sonny Boy Williamson I and Sonny Boy Williamson II; Charlie Musselwhite credits him as a mentor. He composed many of the band's songs and sang lead vocal on a handful of their recordings. His distinctive guitar style has also been identified as that of the uncredited accompanist who backed the Sanctified Church gospel singer Bessie Johnson on record.

The Memphis Jug Band had a fluid membership during the nearly 40 years that it was active, recording under a number of names and in various styles ranging from blues and rags to gospel. All the while, Shade was the backbone of the group, as he was the one responsible for finding new members to keep the band going. The group performed a mixture of traditional and original material. Shade tried, whenever possible, to copyright his music under his name. Besides being the band's musical leader, he was also in charge of their business affairs, planning concerts and distributing income.

At the band's peak, Shade worked on a weekly retainer with Victor Records and was able to buy a house with his wife, the singer Jennie Mae Clayton, and $3000 worth of stock in Victor. He lost both the stock and the house shortly after the Great Depression began in 1929.

The band's visibility declined in the mid-1930s as a result of the overall decline in commercial recordings, a shift in musical taste toward more urbane swing music, and violence occurring in Memphis. Blues revivalists found Shade and his old partners still playing together into the early 1960s and released several field recordings under the name of the Memphis Jug Band. The band during this period usually included Shade's long-time friend Charlie Burse, whom he had hired in 1928 as a vocalist and tenor guitarist, and sometimes included his old rival Gus Cannon. Shade also performed as an accompanist on Cannon's "comeback" album, Walk Right In, recorded by Stax Records in 1963.

Shade's gravestone, Memphis, 2008

Shade died of pneumonia, at John Gaston Hospital, in Memphis, in 1966, aged 68, and was buried in Shelby County Cemetery. The fact that this is a public cemetery and full of unmarked graves, reveals Shade's poverty in his later years. In 2008 a group of musicians based at the Old Town School of Folk Music held a fundraiser and purchased a headstone for his grave. The same group sponsored a "brass note" on the Beale Street walk of fame, dedicated on August 1, 2009. Shade's band was the first jug band to receive this honor.

== Discography ==
The Memphis Jug Band recorded nearly 100 sides between 1927 and 1934, making it the most recorded of the pre-war jug bands. In the first four of these years, it recorded at least 60 songs for Victor Records. Over time, the band's style moved to a jazzier beat, as evidenced by its final recordings, in 1934. Famous singles by the band include "Lindberg Hop", "On the Road Again", "Newport News Blues", "K.C. Moan", and "Stealin' Stealin'".

== See also ==
- Jug band
