= Memphis Jug Band =

American musical group

The Memphis Jug Band was an American musical group that was active from the mid-1920s to the late 1950s. The band featured harmonica, kazoo, fiddle, and mandolin or banjolin, backed by guitar, piano, washboard, washtub bass, and jug. They played slow blues, pop songs, humorous songs, and upbeat dance numbers with jazz and string-band flavors. The band made the first commercial recordings in Memphis, Tennessee, and recorded more sides than any other prewar jug band. They mainly were based in the Beale Street area of Memphis.

Beginning in 1926, African-American musicians in the Memphis area grouped around the singer, songwriter, guitarist, and harmonica player Will Shade (also known as Son Brimmer or Sun Brimmer). The personnel of the band varied from day to day, with Shade booking gigs and arranging recording sessions. The band functioned as a training ground for musicians who went on to make careers of their own.

== Members ==
Among the recorded members of the Memphis Jug Band at various times were Will Shade (harmonica, guitar, washtub bass, vocals), Charlie Burse (guitar, tenor guitar, vocals), Charlie Nickerson (vocals, piano), Charlie Pierce (fiddle), Charlie Polk (jug), Tewee Blackman (guitar, vocals), Hambone Lewis (jug), Jab Jones (piano, jug, vocals), Johnny Hodges (or Hardge) (piano), Ben Ramey (kazoo, vocals), Will Weldon (guitar, vocals), Memphis Minnie (guitar, vocals), Vol Stevens (vocals, fiddle, mandolin), Milton Robie (fiddle), Otto Gilmore (or Gilmer, drums and woodblocks), and Robert Burse (washboard, drums). Vocals were provided by Hattie Hart, Memphis Minnie, Jennie Mae Clayton (Shade's wife), and Minnie Wallace. The Memphis Jug Band accompanied Memphis Minnie on two sides for Victor Records in 1930, one of her first recording sessions. Some members also contributed to gospel recordings, either uncredited or as part of the Memphis Sanctified Singers. The large membership pool gave the Memphis Jug Band the flexibility to play a mixture of ballads, dance tunes, knock-about novelty numbers, and blues.

== Band name ==
The group recorded under several names for various record labels: the Picaninny Jug Band, the Memphis Sanctified Singers, the Carolina Peanut Boys, the Dallas Jug Band, the Memphis Sheiks, and the Jolly Jug Band. Other releases were credited to individual members of the band — Hattie Hart, Minnie Wallace, Will Weldon, Charlie Nickerson, Vol Stevens, Charlie Burse, "Poor Jab" Jones, and Will Shade, but were performed with accompaniment by other members of the band.

== Sound ==
The remarkable sound of the Memphis Jug Band was partly due to its unusual instruments. The first recorded jug bands, based in Louisville, Kentucky, were jazz-oriented groups with a jug taking the place of a tuba or trombone. The Memphis Jug Band borrowed from this model, but added a kazoo as a prominent lead instrument, similar in sound to a trumpet in a jazz band. Another variation from the Louisville sound was a focus on country blues songs, like those favored by Jim Jackson and other Memphis-area solo artists. (The Memphis Jug Band recorded Jackson's hit song "Kansas City Blues" twice and performed it on the television program, Blues Street, in 1958.) This basic jug band sound was adopted by other Memphis-area groups, such as Gus Cannon's Jug Stompers, Jed Davenport's Beale Street Jug Band, and Jack Kelly's South Memphis Jug Band.

The band initially played mostly country blues, but its repertoire expanded as new members contributed their own styles. Songs led by Charlie "Bozo" Nickerson, such as "Everybody's Talking About Sadie Green" and "Cave Man Blues", were boisterous and funny; songs led by Charlie Burse, such as "Little Green Slippers" and "Insane Crazy Blues", were more musically complex and jazz-oriented; songs led by Charlie Pierce sounded like Appalachian fiddle tunes, backed by impressive jug playing and shouted challenges from his bandmates. Will Shade continued playing straightforward country blues songs for the rest of his life, but he also introduced some jazz elements, as in his 1962 field recording of "Jump and Jive", which incorporates lyrics from Cab Calloway's "Jumpin' Jive".

Blues scholar Paul Oliver noted that the "raspy, buzzing sound" of some of the jug band instruments was close to the musical aesthetic of [Africa, and that the jug and kazoo represented the voices of animals or ancestral spirits. However, many of the Memphis Jug Band's influences are more readily apparent in popular musical styles of their time.

== Performances ==
The Memphis Jug Band played wherever they could find engagements and busked in local parks and markets. They were popular with white and black audiences, playing at country clubs and parties at the Peabody Hotel. The band was a favorite of former mayor Edward Hull "Boss" Crump and was shown performing at one of Crump's parties in a Life photo feature in 1941. Crump often booked the band at his home for parties.

== Commercial recordings ==
Between 1927 and 1934, the Memphis Jug Band made more than 80 commercial recordings, first for Victor Records, then (as the Picaninny Jug Band) for the Champion-Gennett label, and finally for OKeh Records. The Victor recordings were made in Memphis and Atlanta, Georgia, between 1927 and 1930; the Champion-Gennett recordings were made in Richmond, Indiana, in August 1932; and the final sessions for Okeh were held in Chicago in November 1934. By that time, their style of music was no longer in demand by record companies, as commercial styles were moving toward a more urban sound.

Two of their 1920s recordings were included on the influential Anthology of American Folk Music, released in 1952 (a third is on the unreleased fourth volume). Their 1928 recording of "Stealin', Stealin'" was included on the compilation album The Country Blues issued by Folkways Records in 1959. The song became one of the group's best known, especially after the Grateful Dead recorded it as its first single, in 1966.

The other jug band song on The Country Blues was Gus Cannon's "Walk Right In", which was a hit for the Rooftop Singers in 1962. Capitalizing on the success of that recording, Memphis label Stax Records invited Cannon, then 79 years old, to record a full-length album the following year. Will Shade, the leader of the Memphis Jug Band, backed Cannon on jug, and former member Milton Roby played washboard.

Twenty-eight of the group's commercial recordings from 1927 to 1934 were reissued by Yazoo Records in 1980 on the double album Memphis Jug Band. It was reissued in 1991 on CD with a reduced and reprogrammed 23-track listing.

== Field recordings ==
During the folk revival of the 1950s, Shade made several field recordings. His ongoing activity as a performer and his accessible location in Memphis made him a popular starting point for scholars looking for other musicians in the area. Shade often gathered musicians at his apartment at Fourth and Beale for informal recording sessions featuring former musical rivals (including his former romantic rival Furry Lewis), playing together in different combinations. Shade continued using the name Memphis Jug Band, even for recordings consisting only of one or two other members and himself. His wife, Jennie Mae Clayton, who sang on some of the earliest Memphis Jug Band recordings, also sang on some of these field recordings.

These commercially available field recordings are from this period:

- American Skiffle Bands, recorded 1957, reissued 2012, three songs and one interview
- Alan Lomax Blues Songbook, recorded 1959, reissued 2003, one song
- Conversation with the Blues, recorded 1960, reissued 1997, one interview
- Tennessee Recordings (from the George Mitchell collection), recorded 1962, reissued 2006, seven songs
- Blueskvarter: 1964, vol. 3, recorded 1964, reissued 2004, two songs

== Legacy ==
The Memphis Jug Band played a crucial role in shaping the jug band format, which later evolved into the blues ensembles that form the foundation of contemporary popular music. Like many acoustic blues musicians from their time, their influence was somewhat overshadowed by the rise of electric blues in the 1950s. Today, modern jug bands continue to perform numerous songs originally popularized by the Memphis Jug Band, but only those covered by rock groups in the 1960s remain widely recognizable to broader audiences.

The Memphis Jug Band was awarded a Brass Note on the Beale Street "Walk of Fame" in 2009. It was among the first group of inductees into the Jug Band Hall of Fame, an informal website run by jug band musicians, in 2010.

== Selected discography ==
Year	Title	Genre	Label
1980	Memphis Jug Band	Popular, blues	Yazoo
2001	The Best of the Memphis Jug Band	Ballad, Blues	Yazoo
2005	Memphis Jug Band with Cannon's Jug Stompers	Ballad, Blues	JSP
2005	Memphis Shakedown: More Jug Band Classics	Ballad, Blues	JSP Records
2006	Tennessee Recordings	Ballad, Blues	Big Legal Mess Records
2017	American Epic: The Best of the Memphis Jug Band	Popular, blues	Lo-Max
