= Production of phonograph records =

Physical mass production of phonograph records

In the production of phonograph records – discs that were commonly made of shellac, and later, vinyl – sound was recorded directly onto a master disc (also called the matrix, sometimes just the master) at the recording studio. From about 1950 on (earlier for some large record companies, later for some small ones) it became usual to have the performance first recorded on audio tape, which could then be processed and/or edited, and then dubbed on to the master disc.

== Background ==
The grooves are engraved into the master disc on a mastering lathe. Early versions of these master discs were soft wax, and later a harder lacquer was used.

The mastering process was originally something of an art as the operator had to manually allow for the changes in sound which affected how wide the space for the groove needed to be on each rotation. Sometimes the engineer would sign his work, or leave humorous or cryptic comments in the lead-out groove area, where it was normal to scratch or stamp identifying codes to distinguish each master.

== Mass producing ==
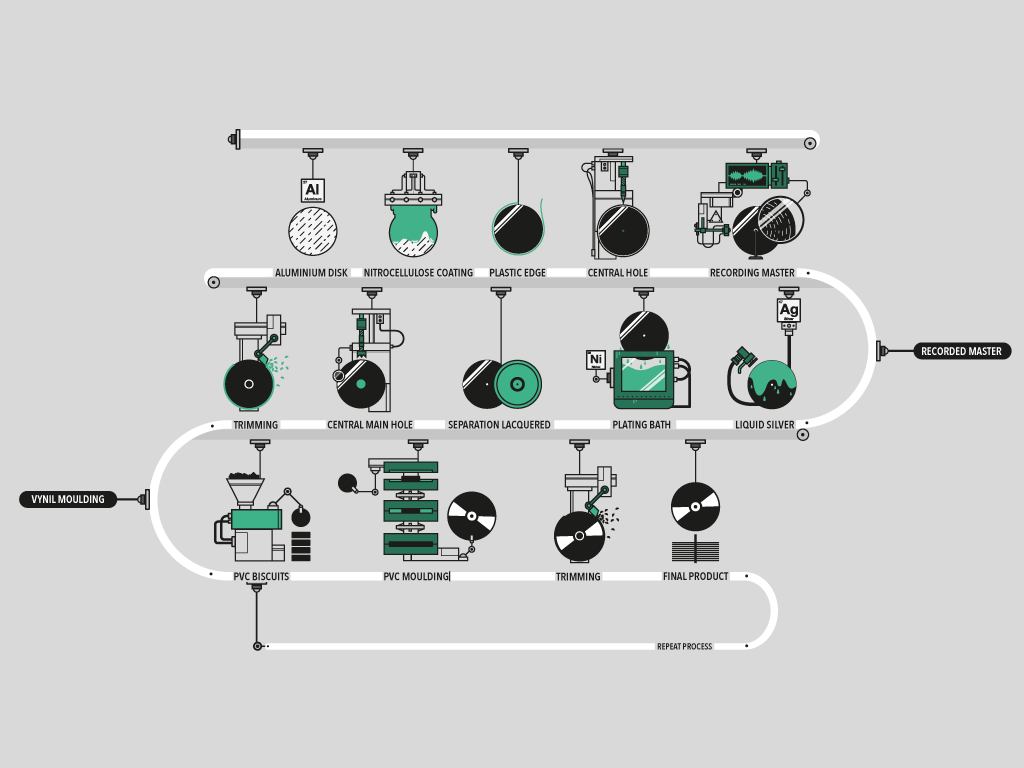
Production of phonograph records

The original soft master, known as a "lacquer", was silvered using the same process as the silvering of mirrors. To prepare the master for making copies, soft masters made of wax were coated with fine graphite. Later masters made of lacquer were sprayed with a saponin mix, rinsed, and then sprayed with stannous chloride, which sensitized the surface. After another rinse, they were sprayed with a mix of the silver solution and dextrose reducer to create a silver coating. This coating provided the conductive layer to carry the current for the subsequent electroplating, commonly with a nickel alloy.

In the early days of microgroove records (1940–1960), nickel plating was only brief, just an hour or less. This was followed by copper plating, which was both quicker and simpler to manage at that time. Later with advent of nickel sulfamate plating solutions, all matrices were plated with solid nickel. Most factories transferred the master matrix after an initial flash of nickel from a slow warm nickel electroplating bath at around 15 amperes to a hot 130 degree nickel plating bath. In this, the current would be raised at regular intervals until it reached between 110 A and 200 A, depending on the standard of the equipment and the skill of the operators. This and all subsequent metal copies were known as matrices.

When this metal master was removed from the lacquer (master), it would be a negative master or master matrix, since it was a negative copy of the lacquer. (In the UK, this was called the master; note the difference from soft master/lacquer disc above). In the earliest days the negative master was used as a mold to press records sold to the public, but as demand for mass production of records grew, another step was added to the process.

After removing the silver deposit and passifying (see below), the metal master was then electroplated (electroformed) to create metal positive matrices, or "mothers". From these positives, stampers (negatives) would be formed. Producing mothers was similar to electroforming Masters, except the time allowed to turn-up to full current was much shorter and the heavier Mothers could be produced in as little as one hour and stampers (145 grams) could be made in 45 minutes.

Prior to plating either the nickel master or nickel mother, it needed to be passified to prevent the next matrix from adhering to the mother. There were several methods used; EMI favoured the fairly difficult albumin soaking method whereas CBS Records and Philips used the electrolytic method. Soaking in a dichromate solution was another popular method, however, this method risked contaminating the nickel solution with chrome. The electrolytic method was similar to the standard electrolytic cleaning method except the cycles were reversed finishing the process with the matrix as the anode. This also cleaned the surface of the matrix about to be copied. After separating from the master, a new mother was polished with a fine abrasive to remove (or at least round-off) the microscopic "horns" at the top of the grooves, produced by the cutting lathe. This allowed the vinyl to flow better in the pressing stage and reduced the non-fill problem.

Stampers produced from the mothers after separating were chrome plated to provide a hard stain-free surface. Each stamper was next centre punched for the pin on the playback turntable. Methods used included aligning the final locked groove over three pins, or tapping the edge while rotating under the punch until the grooves could be seen (through a microscope) to move constantly towards the centre. Either method was quite skilled and took much effort to learn. The centre punch not only punched a hole, but formed a lip which would be used to secure the stamper into the press.

The stamper was next trimmed to size, and the back sanded smooth, to ensure a smooth finish to the mouldings, and improve contact between the stamper and the press die. The edge was then pressed hydraulically to form another lip to clamp the edge down on the press. The stampers would be used in hydraulic presses to mould the LP discs. The advantages of this system over the earlier more-direct system included ability to make a large number of records quickly by using multiple stampers. Also, more records could be produced from each master since stampers would eventually get damaged, but rarely wear out.

Since the master was the unique source of the positive, made to produce the stampers, it was considered a library item. Accordingly, copy positives, required to replace worn positives, were made from unused early stampers. These were known as copy shells, and were the physical equivalent of the first positive.

The "pedigree" of any record can be traced through the positive/stamper identities used, by reading the lettering found on the record run-out area.

Records are made at manufacturing plants, either ones owned by a major label or ones owned by independent companies which unsigned artists and independent labels can turn to for smaller runs. For most bands today, using any of the largest manufacturing plants such as United Record Pressing or Quality Record Pressings is not cost-effective, due to their inability to produce less than one thousand records (QRP does not accept orders of less than 1000 records, for example). However, both mid-size vinyl plants and smaller, more boutique operations now make smaller orders of less than 1000 records possible.

== Packaging and distribution ==
Singles are typically sold in plain or label-logo paper sleeves, though EPs are often treated to a cover in similar style to an LP. LPs are universally packaged in paperboard covers with a paper (usually additional artwork, photography, and/or lyrics) or plastic liner (or "poly-lined" paper) protecting the delicate surface of the record. Few albums have had records packaged inside with a 3 mil polyethylene plastic sleeve, either square or round-bottomed (also called U-shaped), and an accompanying 11×11 paper insert with the additional artwork, photography, and/or lyrics as described above. The insert could be single- or double-sided, in color or grayscale, and glossy or matte.

Packaging methods have changed since the introduction of the LP record. The 'wrap-around' or 'flipback' sleeve initially became the standard packaging method for LPs during the 1950s. In this packaging method the front cover is able to be printed in colour and is laminated, whereas the back cover features only black text on a white background and is usually unlaminated. These sleeves are constructed in two parts: a laminated front section is wrapped around a separate back panel. Three 'flaps' are used to fix the front and back panels together on the outside. As the unlaminated cardboard back cover section is prone to discolouration due to exposure to natural light, in some instances a single printed sheet containing the back cover information is pasted over the entire back panel, covering the 'wrap-around' flaps but not reaching the outer edge of the sleeve, thus allowing some of the laminated 'flaps' to be exposed. While discolouration still occurs with this method, it is often less evident than when the cardboard back cover alone is exposed. A common feature of flipback sleeves in the 1960s was for information specific to either monaural or stereo versions of the record (typically a format-specific catalogue number and a "MONO" or "STEREO" disclaimer) would be printed on the same front cover artwork, and the whole front panel shifted up or down to expose the appropriate "version" on the front while the unused one would be covered up (but often not very well) by the back cover panel.

Towards the end of the 1960s advances in printing and packaging technology led to the introduction of the 'fully laminated' sleeve. Rather than the two-part construction of the 'wrap-around' sleeve, this method consists of a single component part, which is printed in full colour and is completely laminated with the 'flaps' tucked inside the back sleeve section. This is the method generally used for all subsequent releases in the vinyl age and is considered superior not only because of the additional ease allowed in the use of a single component, but also because the fully laminated finish offers far better protection from discolouration caused by exposure to natural light.

With the advent of long-playing records, the album cover became more than just packaging and protection, and album cover art became an important part of the music marketing and consuming experience. In the 1970s it became more common to have picture covers on singles. Many singles with picture sleeves (especially from the 1960s) are sought out by collectors, and the sleeves alone can go for a high price. LPs can have embossed cover art (with some sections being raised), an effect rarely seen on CD covers. The label area on the disc itself may contain themed or custom artwork rather than the standard record company's logo layout.

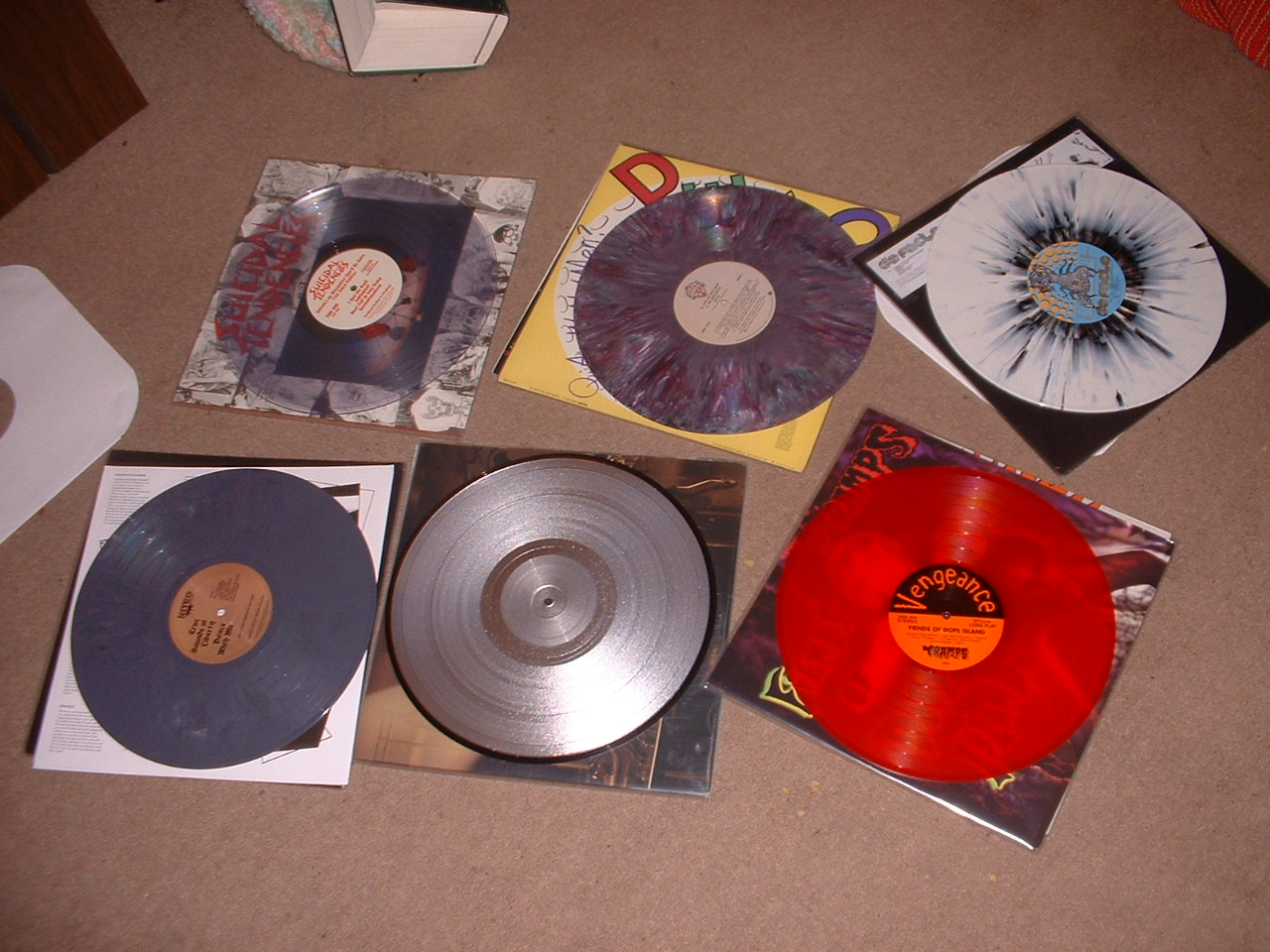
An array of albums pressed in varying presentations

Sometimes bands might make a picture jacket for their record. Again, usually it is cost prohibitive to make less than one thousand jackets. The average cost for manufacturing a 7" record with a picture jacket is approximately $2.50, at a run of one thousand records and jackets - if one uses any of the large manufacturing plants.

Records are generally sold through specialist shops, although some big chain stores also have record departments. Many records are sold from stock, but it is normal to place special orders for less common records. Stock is expensive, so only large city center stores can afford to have several copies of a record.

While records are generally pressed on plain black vinyl, the album itself is given a much more ornamental appearance. This can include a solid color (other than black), splatter art, a marble look, or transparency (either tinged with a color or clear). Some examples of this can be seen to the right. One of the most well known examples of this technique is the white vinyl repressing of The Beatles' White Album.

== Labels ==
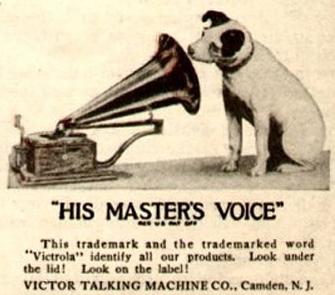
Victor (later RCA Victor) logo featuring Nipper the dog

Record companies organised their products into labels. These could either be subsidiary companies, or they could simply be just a brand name. For example, EMI published records under the His Master's Voice label which was their classical recording brand, Harvest for their progressive rock brand, home to Pink Floyd. They also had Music for Pleasure and Classics for Pleasure as their economy labels. EMI also used the Parlophone brand in the UK for Beatles records in the early 1960s.

In the 1970s successful musicians sought greater control, and one way they achieved this was with their own labels, though normally they were still operated by the large music corporations. Two of the most famous early examples of this were the Beatles' Apple Records and Led Zeppelin's Swan Song Records

In the late 1970s the anarchic punk rock movement gave rise to the independent record labels. These were not owned or even distributed by the major corporations. In the UK, examples were Stiff Records, who published Ian Dury and the Blockheads, and 2 Tone Records, a label for the Specials. These allowed smaller bands to step onto the ladder without having to conform to the rigid rules of the large corporations.

== Home recording ==
One example of an "instantaneous recording" machine, available to the home recording enthusiast by about 1929 or 1930, was the "Sentinel Chromatron" machine. The Sentinel Chromatron recorded on a single side of uncoated aluminum; its records were read with a fibre needle. It was "rather unstable technology" which produced poor sound quality in comparison to shellac records and was rarely used after 1935.

RCA Victor introduced home phonograph disk recorders in October 1930. These phonographs featured a large counterbalanced tone arm with horseshoe magnet pick-up. These types of pick-ups could also be "driven" to actually move the needle and RCA took advantage of that by designing a system of home recording that used "pre-grooved" records. The material that the records were made from (advertised as "Victrolac") was soft and it was possible to somewhat modulate the grooves using the pick-up with proper recording needle and a fairly heavy weight placed on the pick-up. The discs were only six inches in diameter so recording time at 78 rpm was brief. Larger size Victor blanks were introduced late in 1931, when RCA-Victor introduced the Radiola-Electrola RE-57. These machines were capable of recording at 33 1/3 rpm as well as 78 rpm. One could select to record something from the radio or one could record using the hand-held microphone. The RAE-59 sold for a hefty $350.00 at a time when many manufacturers had trouble finding buyers for $50.00 radios.

The home phonograph disk recorders of the 1930s were expensive machines that few could afford. Cheaper machines, such as the Wilcox-Gay Recordio line, were sold during the late 1930s through the early 1950s. They operated at 78 rpm only and were similar in appearance to (and not much larger than) a portable phonograph of the era. One 1941 model that included a radio sold for $39.95, approximately equivalent to $500 in 2005 dollars. The fidelity was adequate for clear voice recordings.

In the past (approximately from the 1940s through the 1970s), there were booths called Voice-O-Graphs, that let the user record their own voice onto a record when money was inserted. These were often found at arcades and tourist attractions alongside other vending and game machines. The Empire State Building's 86th floor observatory in New York City, Coney Island, NY and Conneaut Lake Park, PA are some of the locations which had such machines. Gem Razors also created thousands of free Voice-O-Graph records during wartime for the troops to send home to their families.

In the former USSR, records were commonly homemade using discarded medical x-rays. These records, which were usually made under the nation's samizdat movement, were nicknamed "Bones" or "Ribs", were usually inscribed with illegal copies of popular music banned by the government. They also became a popular means of distribution among Soviet punk bands; in addition to the high cost and low availability of vinyl, punk music was politically suppressed, and publishing outlets were limited.

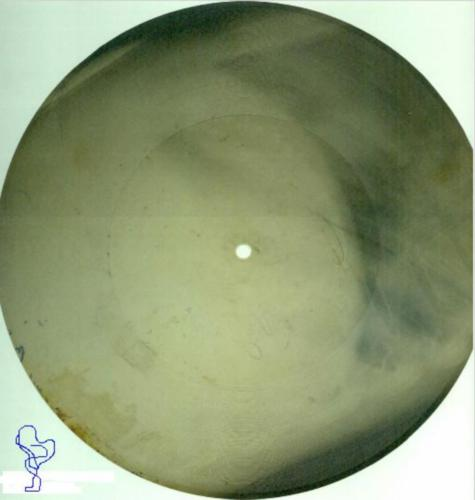
Home-made "Bone" record.

Currently, two companies (Vestax and Vinylrecorder) offer disk recorders priced in the high four figures which enable "experienced professional users" and enthusiasts to produce high-fidelity stereo vinyl recordings. The Gakken Company in Japan also offers the Emile Berliner Gramophone Kit, and while it does not record actual records, it enables the user to physically inscribe sounds onto a CD (or any flat, smooth surface) with a needle and replay them back on any similar machine.

Home recording equipment made a cameo appearance in the 1941 Marx Brothers film, The Big Store. A custom recording was also the original surprise Christmas present in the 1931 version of The Bobbsey Twins' Wonderful Secret (when the book was rewritten in 1962 as The Bobbsey Twins' Wonderful Winter Secret, it became an 8 mm movie).
