= Bernard MacMahon (filmmaker) =

British-American film director and screenwriter

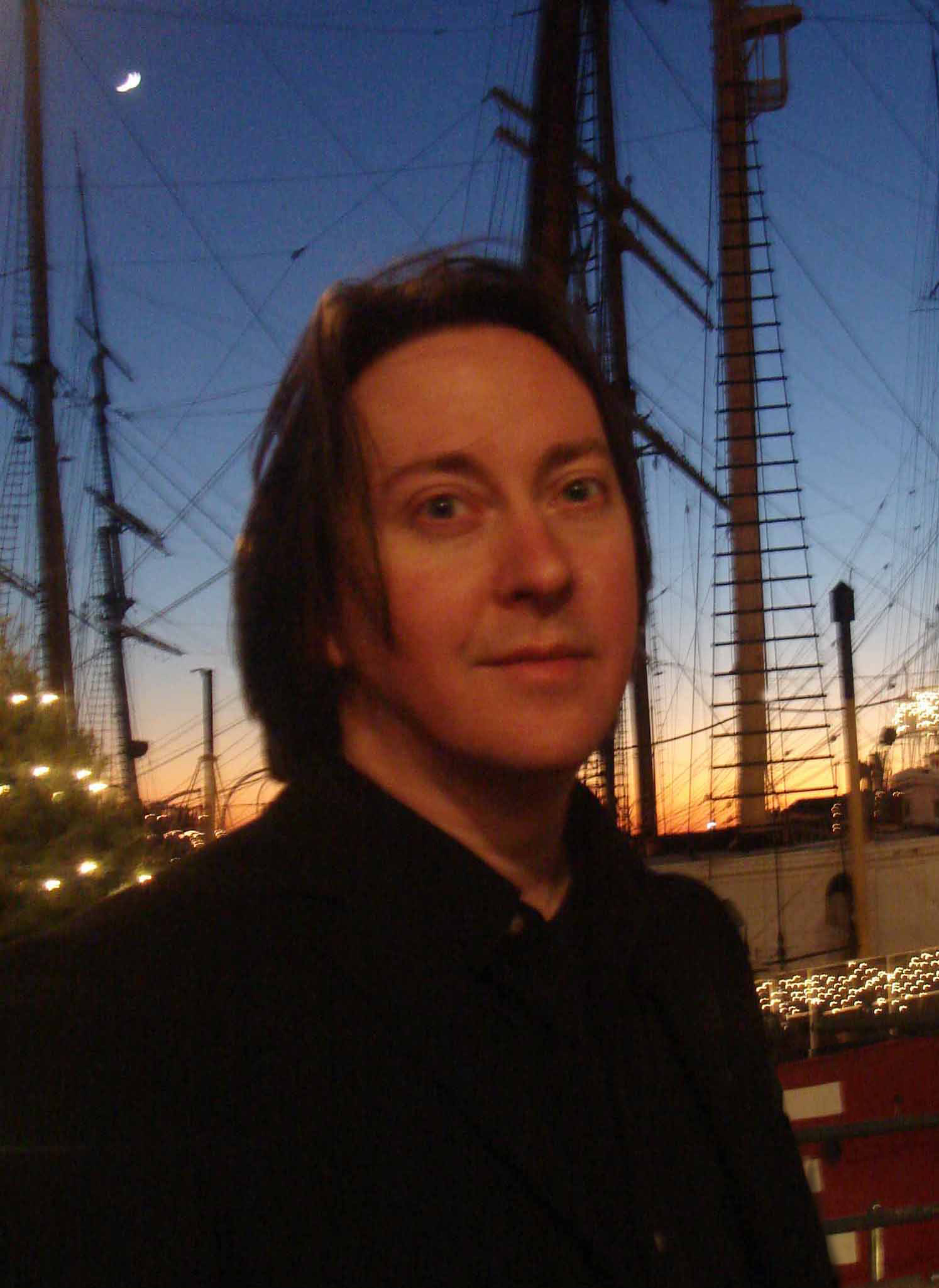
- MacMahon in 2014
- Born: London, England
- Education: Winchester
- Occupation: Filmmaker

Bernard MacMahon is an Irish-British filmmaker. His American Epic films are widely considered as the definitive portrait of a musical era, and one of the best music documentaries ever made.

== Early life ==
Bernard MacMahon was born in England and grew up in South London. He developed an interest in early American cinema at a young age and was shooting and editing 8 mm short films by the age of 12. MacMahon said “America has fascinated me since I was a child. My big love is American cinema, especially early American cinema, and I’ve always been fascinated by that period in the 20s when the technology and artistic language of film was being invented.”

== Film career ==
Bernard MacMahon's debut film was American Epic, an award-winning documentary film series about the first recordings of roots music in the United States during the 1920s and their cultural, social and technological impact on North America and the world. Directed and co-written by MacMahon, the story was told through twelve ethnically and musically diverse musicians who auditioned for and participated in those pioneering recording sessions; The Carter Family, the Memphis Jug Band, Elder J.E. Burch, The Williamson Brothers, Dick Justice, Charley Patton, The Hopi Indian Chanters, Joseph Kekuku, Lydia Mendoza, the Breaux Family, Mississippi John Hurt, and Blind Willie Johnson.

The film series was created, written and produced by MacMahon, Allison McGourty and Duke Erikson. It was first broadcast on May 16, 2017, in the United States and was narrated by Robert Redford. The film was the result of ten years of intensive field research and postulated a radically new take on American history, namely that America was democratized through the invention of electrical sound recording and the subsequent auditions the record labels held across North America in the late 1920s, which were open to every ethnic minority and genre of music. The films contained many previously untold stories, a vast amount of previously unseen and extremely rare archival footage and dramatically advanced audio restorations of the 1920s and 1930s recordings. When MacMahon presented his vision for the films and the archival footage to Robert Redford at their first meeting, Redford pronounced it “America’s greatest untold story”. Many critics have cited the American Epic films as being one of the best music documentaries ever made.

During production of the American Epic documentary series, MacMahon directed and co-wrote The American Epic Sessions, a documentary film in which a sound engineer restored the fabled long-lost first electrical sound recording system from 1925 and twenty contemporary artists paid tribute to the momentous machine by attempting to record songs on it for the first time in 80 years. The film starred Steve Martin, Nas, Elton John, Willie Nelson, Merle Haggard, Alabama Shakes, Jack White, Taj Mahal, Ana Gabriel, The Avett Brothers, Rhiannon Giddens, and Beck. The American Epic Sessions employed a diverse line-up of performers both ethnically and musically to represent the breadth of cultures that were first given a national platform through the invention of this recording machine. It also explored the extent to which the recordings made on it in the 1920s influenced and inspired contemporary music. The film involved a decade of work restoring the machine, which was pieced together from spare parts scattered across the globe, in order to better understand the origins of modern recording technology, and the influence the machine had on world culture. The film received widespread acclaim for its direction, musical performances, sound and cinematography.

In September 2017 the University of Chicago Laboratory Schools announced a nine-month preschool to high school educational program based on MacMahon's American Epic films beginning on October 6, 2017. The school founded by American educator John Dewey in 1896 has over 2,015 students enrolled in 15 grades. The program featured MacMahon and producer and co-writer Allison McGourty as Artists-in-Residence.

MacMahon draws and paints detailed storyboards and lighting designs in advance of production, and has stated that he was influenced by the cinematography of John J. Mescall and the painting of Diego Velázquez. He is a member of the Directors Guild of America, the Television Academy, the Writers Guild of America West, the Sundance Institute and is the co-founder of Lo-Max Films.

== Awards and honors ==
The American Epic documentary series and The American Epic Sessions film received a number of awards, including the Foxtel Audience Award at the 2016 Sydney Film Festival, the Audience Award and Discovery Award for Best First Time Director at the 2016 Calgary International Film Festival, and was nominated for a Primetime Emmy. MacMahon was nominated by the British Academy Film Awards as a Breakthrough Talent for directing The American Epic Sessions. On April 23, 2018, the Focal International Awards nominated MacMahon for Best Use of Footage in a History Feature and Best Use of Footage in a Music Production.

Award	Category	Recipients and nominees	Result	Ref.
Calgary International Film Festival	The Discovery Award	Bernard MacMahon	Won	
Calgary International Film Festival	Audience Award	The American Epic Sessions	Won	
Primetime Emmy Award	Outstanding Music Direction	Bernard MacMahon, Duke Erikson, T Bone Burnett and Jack White	Nominated	
Sydney Film Festival	Foxtel Audience Award	American Epic	Won	
Tryon International Film Festival	Best Documentary	Bernard MacMahon	Won	
Tryon International Film Festival	Best Overall Picture	Bernard MacMahon	Won	
Association for Recorded Sound Collections	Best History in Recorded Folk or Roots Music	Bernard MacMahon	Won	
British Academy Film Awards	Breakthrough Talent	Bernard MacMahon	Nominated	
Focal International Awards	Best Use of Footage in a History Feature	Bernard MacMahon	Nominated	
Focal International Awards	Best Use of Footage in a Music Production	Bernard MacMahon	Nominated	

== Filmography ==
Year	Film	Director	Writer	Score	Producer	Appears in
2017	American Epic: The Big Bang	Yes	Yes	Yes	Yes	
2017	American Epic: Blood and Soil	Yes	Yes	Yes	Yes	Yes
2017	American Epic: Out of the Many the One	Yes	Yes	Yes	Yes	
2017	The American Epic Sessions	Yes	Yes	Yes	Yes	Yes
2025	Becoming Led Zeppelin	Yes	Yes			

== Bibliography ==
MacMahon was the co-author of a collaborative memoir chronicling the 10-year odyssey researching and making the American Epic documentary films and The American Epic Sessions. The book was co-written with producer Allison McGourty, and music historian Elijah Wald. American Epic: The First Time America Heard Itself was published on May 2, 2017, by Simon & Schuster. The book was the winner of the 2017 Association for Recorded Sound Collections Award.

== Discography ==
MacMahon was the co-composer of the film score for the American Epic documentaries and was the editor and compiler of a series of album releases that accompanied the American Epic films. These albums received widespread acclaim, with the 5-CD box set American Epic: The Collection being named as Rolling Stone’s Reissue of the Year and many critics acclaiming it as being the best box set of its kind ever to be released.
