= Allison McGourty =

British film producer and screenwriter

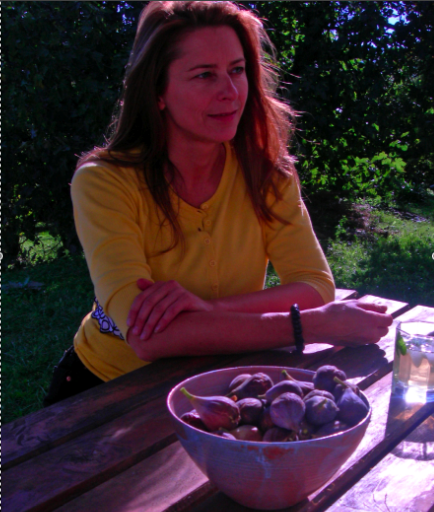
- Born: Allison Claire McGourty; Bristol, England
- Occupations: Film producer, screenwriter
- Years active: 1990–present

Allison McGourty is a British film producer and screenwriter.

== Early life ==
Allison McGourty was born in Bristol, England. As a child she moved to Venice, Italy, then relocated to Gleniffer Braes, on the boundary of Barrhead in East Renfrewshire, Scotland, where she attended the Cross Arthurlie Primary School. As a young girl she was a competitive horsewoman, qualifying for the Horse of the Year Show. She enrolled in Barrhead High School where she won the History Prize and played clarinet, and tenor saxophone in the National Youth Jazz Orchestra of Scotland. From 1982 to 1987, McGourty attended Staffordshire University in England, gaining a Bachelor of Science degree with honours in computer science and French. During her degree course, she lived in Paris and worked for Électricité de France.

== Early career ==
McGourty began her professional career working for the international management consultancy firm Deloitte. In 1990, she joined Reuters, where she was part of the launch team for Reuters Television. In 1995 she accepted a post at the BBC, where she managed documentary programming at the UK Horizons television channel before being promoted to the BBC World Service.

In 2003, McGourty founded the British independent record label LO-MAX Records. She signed the acclaimed rock band The Wrens to the label after spotting them at the South by Southwest music festival in Austin, Texas. She also signed The Go-Betweens album Oceans Apart, Kevin Ayers' celebrated The Unfairground and posthumous releases by Jeff Buckley. In 2010, McGourty signed the Greenlandic singer-songwriter Simon Lynge, whose debut album, The Future, reached the top of the Amazon UK Rock Charts on the week of its release. McGourty wrote, directed and produced a short film about Lynge which she shot in Greenland. McGourty founded Lo-Max Publishing Ltd, which publishes Frank Fairfield, Louis Michot of The Lost Bayou Ramblers and Simon Lynge. Lo-Max Publishing's music has been featured on the US television shows Lie to Me, Brothers & Sisters and The American Epic Sessions.

== Film career ==
In 2006 McGourty founded Lo-Max Films and was the creator, producer and co-writer of the Emmy Award nominated American Epic documentary film series. The films covered the first recordings of roots music in the United States during the 1920s and their cultural, social and technological impact on North America and the world. The series involved ten years of field research and has been sited as one of the best music documentaries ever made.

McGourty produced and co-wrote The American Epic Sessions, a musical film, directed by Bernard MacMahon, in which an engineer restores the fabled long-lost first electrical sound recording system from 1925, and twenty contemporary artists pay tribute to the momentous machine by attempting to record songs on it for the first time in 80 years. The film starred Steve Martin, Nas, Elton John, Alabama Shakes, Willie Nelson, Merle Haggard, Jack White, Taj Mahal, Ana Gabriel, Pokey LaFarge, Rhiannon Giddens and Beck.

In September 2017 the University of Chicago Laboratory Schools announced a nine-month preschool to high school educational program based on McGourty's American Epic films beginning on 6 October 2017. The school, founded by American educator John Dewey in 1896, has over 2,015 students enrolled in 15 grades. The program featured McGourty and director Bernard MacMahon as Artists-in-Residence.

McGourty is a member of the Academy of Television Arts & Sciences, the Writers Guild of America West, the Sundance Institute, and the International Documentary Association. She is the founder of Lo-Max Films, along with film director Bernard MacMahon and musician Duke Erikson.

== Awards and honors ==
Allison McGourty's American Epic documentary series and The American Epic Sessions have received numerous awards, including the Foxtel Audience Award at the Sydney Film Festival, the Audience Award at the Calgary International Film Festival and a nomination for a Primetime Emmy. McGourty was nominated by the British Academy Film Awards as a Breakthrough Talent for screenwriting, producing and music supervising The American Epic Sessions. On 23 April 2018, the Focal International Awards nominated McGourty for Best Use of Footage in a History Feature and Best Use of Footage in a Music Production.

Award	Category	Recipients and nominees	Result	Ref.
Calgary International Film Festival	Audience Award	The American Epic Sessions	Won	
Sydney Film Festival	Foxtel Audience Award	American Epic	Won	
Primetime Emmy Award	Outstanding Music Direction	The American Epic Sessions	Nominated	
Hawaii International Film Festival	Halekulani Golden Orchid Award	American Epic: Out of the Many the One	Nominated	
Tryon International Film Festival	Best Documentary	American Epic	Won	
Tryon International Film Festival	Best Overall Picture	American Epic	Won	
Association for Recorded Sound Collections	Best History in Recorded Folk or Roots Music	Allison McGourty	Won	
British Academy Film Awards	Breakthrough Talent	Allison McGourty	Nominated	
Focal International Awards	Best Use of Footage in a History Feature	Allison McGourty	Nominated	
Focal International Awards	Best Use of Footage in a Music Production	Allison McGourty	Nominated	

== Filmography ==
Year	Film	screenWriter	Producer	Music supervisor	director
2010	Simon Lynge in Greenland		Yes		Yes
2017	American Epic: The Big Bang	Yes	Yes	Yes	
2017	American Epic: Blood and Soil	Yes	Yes	Yes	
2017	American Epic: Out of the Many, the One	Yes	Yes	Yes	
2017	The American Epic Sessions	Yes	Yes	Yes	
2025	Becoming Led Zeppelin	Yes	Yes	Yes	

== Bibliography ==
McGourty was the co-author of a collaborative memoir chronicling the 10-year odyssey researching and making the American Epic documentary films and The American Epic Sessions. The book was co-written with Bernard MacMahon and music historian Elijah Wald. American Epic: The First Time America Heard Itself was published on 2 May 2017 by Simon & Schuster. The book was the winner of the 2017 Association for Recorded Sound Collections Award.

== Discography ==
McGourty was the co-producer of a series of album releases that accompanied the American Epic films. These albums received widespread acclaim with the 5-CD box set American Epic: The Collection being named as Rolling Stone's Reissue of the Year and many critics acclaiming it as being the best box set of its kind ever to be released.

McGourty was the editor and compiler of American Epic: The Best of Blues which Robert Christgau awarded with an A grade and made his number 2 Best Album of 2017.

== Photography ==
McGourty was the unit still photographer for the American Epic film production and has photographed portraits of numerous authors for their books, including Charles Shaar Murray, Cathi Unsworth, and Tony Barrell.
