= Duke Erikson =

American musician, screenwriter, and film producer

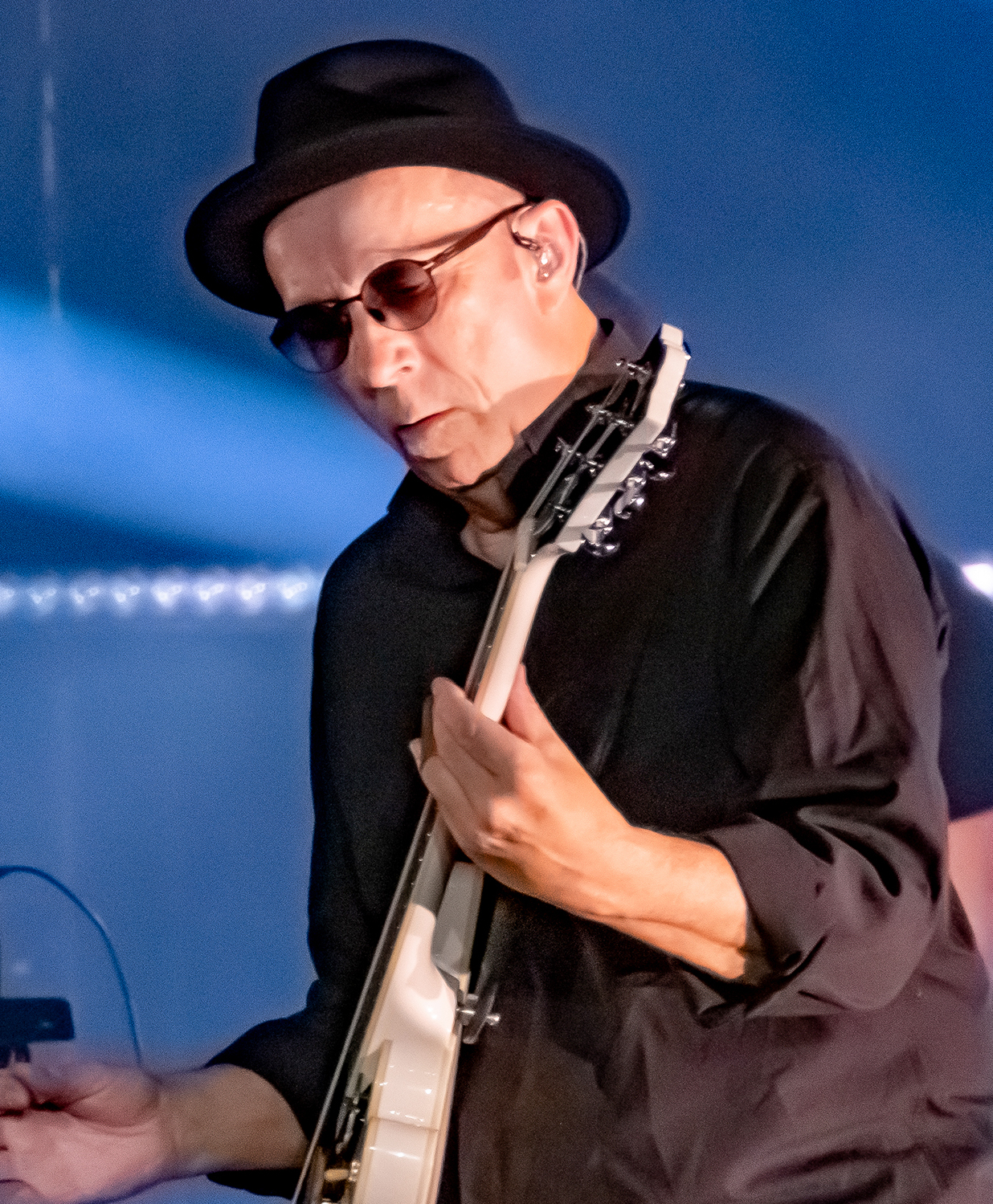
- Duke Erikson performing with Garbage at The Shrine Auditorium in Los Angeles, 2019

Background information
- Born: Douglas Elwin Erikson; January 15, 1951 (age 75); Lyons, Nebraska, U.S.
- Genres: Rock, alternative rock
- Occupations: Musician, songwriter, screenwriter, film producer, record producer
- Instruments: Guitar, keyboards, vocals
- Years active: 1974–present
- Labels: Geffen Records; A&E Records; Atlantic Records

Douglas Elwin "Duke" Erikson (born January 15, 1951) is an American musician, songwriter, screenwriter, film producer and record producer, best known as a co-founder and guitarist of the alternative rock band Garbage. Garbage has sold more than 17 million albums worldwide.

Erikson's musical career began in 1974 following the establishment of Spooner with Butch Vig, who he would later join in the bands Fire Town and Garbage. Spooner's debut album, Every Corner Dance, was released in 1982 and was followed by 1984's Wildest Dreams. In 1986, Erikson, together with Vig, formed Fire Town, releasing their debut album In the Heart of the Heart Country in 1987, before releasing their second and final album, The Good Life, in 1989. In 1993, Erikson, Vig and Steve Marker formed Garbage, recruiting Scottish singer Shirley Manson to join the band following an appearance by her band Angelfish on MTV's 120 Minutes.

Their debut album was released in 1995 and achieved considerable worldwide success, spawning the successful singles "Stupid Girl" and "Only Happy When it Rains". They followed this success with their critically acclaimed second album, Version 2.0 in 1998, before writing and recording the theme song for the James Bond film The World Is Not Enough in 1999. Garbage continued to record and tour throughout the early 2000s, releasing their third album, Beautiful Garbage in 2001, and their fourth, Bleed Like Me in 2005 before entering an "indefinite hiatus". They briefly regrouped in 2007 to release the compilation album Absolute Garbage and lead single "Tell Me Where It Hurts". They regrouped in 2010 to begin recording their fifth album, Not Your Kind of People (2012), and subsequently releasing Strange Little Birds (2016), No Gods No Masters (2021) and Let All That We Imagine Be the Light (2025).

== Early life ==
Duke Erikson was born in Lyons, a small rural community in Nebraska. His first musical instrument was the piano, and his second was the guitar. At the age of 16 he joined his first band, The British, which was inspired by his passion for the British beat movement. Erikson operated the light show for The British which was constructed out of a cigar box and door hangers. "I ran that with my left hand while I played Farfisa organ with my right," he commented.

When Erikson completed high school, he attended Wayne State College where he studied drawing and painting, ultimately becoming a teaching assistant.

== Musical career ==
=== 1974–1985 ===
Erikson formed the rock band Spooner in 1974 with two fellow musicians in Madison, Wisconsin. Erikson sang lead vocals, played keyboards and guitar, and became the band's principal songwriter, his compositions being described by City Lights as "strangely seductive" and "immediately draw[ing] in the listener". Spooner became a quartet when Butch Vig joined them on drums. Spooner released two well-received albums, Every Corner Dance and The Wildest Dreams, and toured across the Midwest. Rolling Stone magazine called their debut album "a convincing collection of sparkling pop music", to which "Erikson's edgy, poetic slice-of-small-town-life lyrics add a genuine, idiosyncratic touch".

In 1983, Erikson helped Vig and Steve Marker establish Smart Studios in Madison, where he helped to design the studio interior and where he has carried out engineering, production and remixing work for a series of local and international rock artists.

=== 1986–1993 ===
In 1986, Erikson collaborated again with Vig to form the garage-rock band Fire Town, in which he played guitar and contributed vocals. The band released two albums, In the Heart of the Heart Country and The Good Life, the latter on Atlantic Records. Rolling Stone praised their debut as "a striking, thoughtful album" with "killer harmonies".

While Fire Town had disbanded by 1989, Spooner had an unexpected late resurgence: their single "Mean Old World" became a hit, prompting them to re-form, make a new album – The Fugitive Dance – and embark on a tour before they disbanded in 1993.

=== 1994–present ===
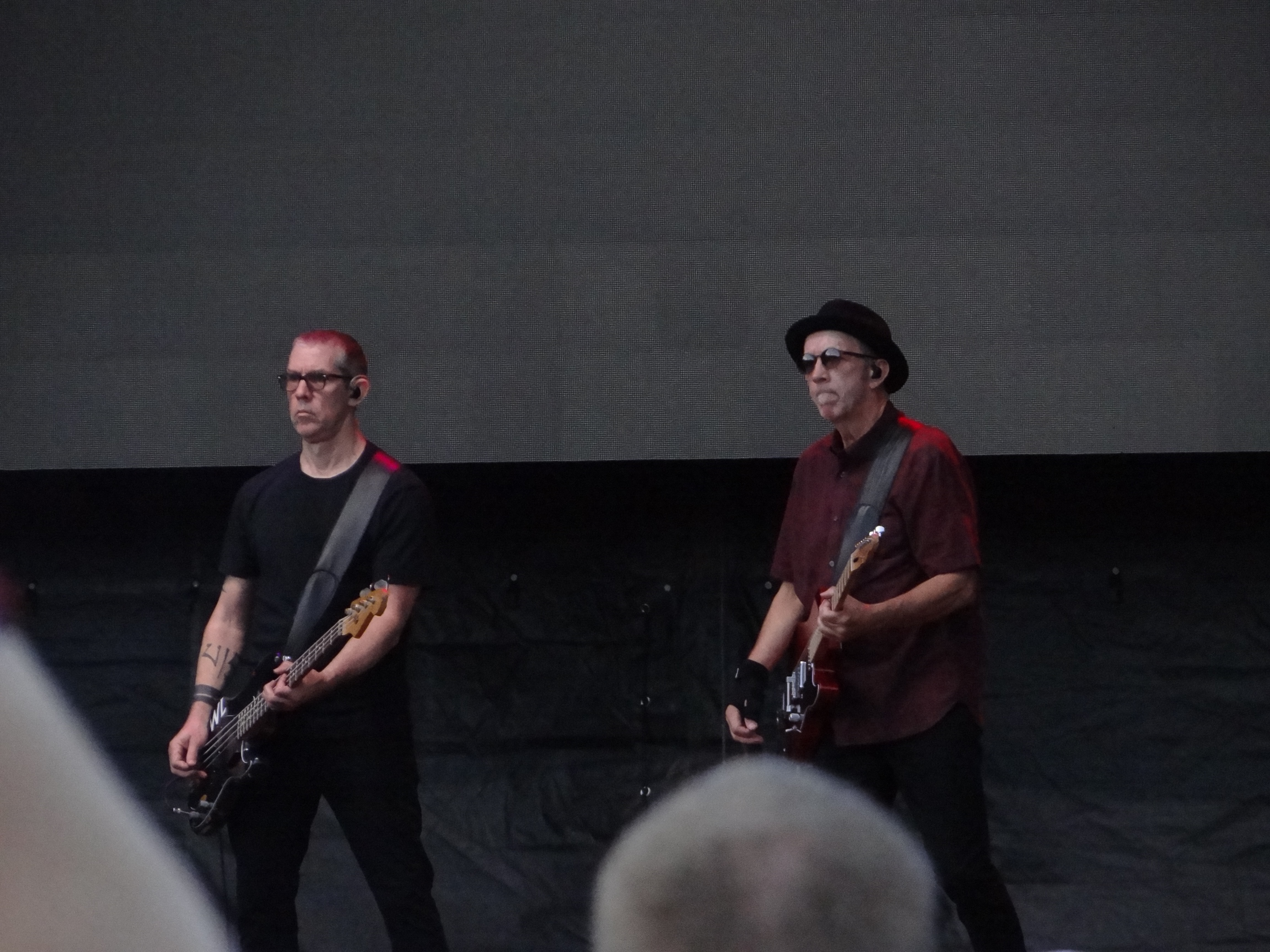
Erikson (right) with Garbage touring bassist Eric Avery, 2021

After Marker saw singer Shirley Manson performing with her band Angelfish on MTV's 120 Minutes in 1994, he persuaded Erikson and Vig that they should audition her for their new band, which became Garbage. Erikson co-wrote the band's seven albums, contributing guitar, keyboards, and bass. The albums have sold more than 17 million copies worldwide.

In a major feature on the band for The Sunday Times in 1998, the British journalist Tony Barrell described Erikson's persona in Garbage as "the cool dude with the goatee and the Mr Spockish demeanour". Though sometimes a taciturn presence in the band, Erikson has been known to contribute an air of dry humour to media interviews. During a discussion in 1996 about the interpersonal chemistry within Garbage, he deadpanned: "We have a little room where we go and cry."

Erikson's other projects include the production of other artists. He produced the single "If You Go" by the Greenlandic singer Simon Lynge, which received regular airplay in Britain during 2011 after being added to the BBC Radio 2 playlist.

Erikson is on the board of directors of the acclaimed UK independent record label Lo-Max Records, which is home to The Wrens, The Go-Betweens, Kevin Ayers, and Simon Lynge. In 2017 he co-produced and worked extensively on sound restoration for the American Epic series as well as co-producing the music for The American Epic Sessions.

Erikson's daughter, Roxy Erickson, is a photographer based in London, England.

== Discography ==
=== Spooner ===
- Cruel School E.P. (1979)
- Every Corner Dance (1982)
- Wildest Dreams (1985)
- The Fugitive Dance (1990)

=== Fire Town ===
- In the Heart of the Heart Country (1987)
- The Good Life (1989)

=== Garbage ===
Studio albums

- Garbage (1995)
- Version 2.0 (1998)
- Beautiful Garbage (2001)
- Bleed Like Me (2005)
- Not Your Kind of People (2012)
- Strange Little Birds (2016)
- No Gods No Masters (2021)
- Let All That We Imagine Be the Light (2025)

Compilation albums

- Special Collection (2002)
- Absolute Garbage (2007)
- Anthology (2022)
- Copy/Paste (2024)

== Film career ==
In 2006 Erikson co-founded Lo-Max Films and was the co-creator, producer and co-writer of the Emmy Award nominated American Epic documentary film series. The films covered the first recordings of roots music in the United States during the 1920s and their cultural, social and technological impact on North America and the world. The series involved ten years of field research and has been cited as one of the best music documentaries ever made.

Erikson co-produced and co-wrote The American Epic Sessions, an award-winning musical film, directed by Bernard MacMahon, in which an engineer restores the fabled long-lost first electrical sound recording system from 1925, and twenty contemporary artists pay tribute to the momentous machine by attempting to record songs on it for the first time in 80 years. The film starred Steve Martin, Nas, Elton John, Alabama Shakes, Willie Nelson, Merle Haggard, Jack White, Taj Mahal, Ana Gabriel, Pokey LaFarge, Rhiannon Giddens and Beck.

In September 2017 the University of Chicago Laboratory Schools announced a nine-month preschool to high school educational program based on Erikson’s American Epic films beginning on 6 October 2017. The school, founded by American educator John Dewey in 1896, has over 2,015 students enrolled in 15 grades.

Erikson is a member of the Academy of Television Arts & Sciences, the Writers Guild of America West. He is the co-founder of Lo-Max Films, along with film director Bernard MacMahon and producer Allison McGourty.

=== Awards and honors ===
Erikson’s American Epic documentary series and The American Epic Sessions have received numerous awards, including the Foxtel Audience Award at the Sydney Film Festival, the Audience Award at the Calgary International Film Festival and a nomination for a Primetime Emmy. On April 23, 2018, the Focal International Awards nominated Erikson for Best Use of Footage in a History Feature and Best Use of Footage in a Music Production.

Award	Category	Recipients and nominees	Result	Ref.
Calgary International Film Festival	Audience Award	The American Epic Sessions	Won	
Sydney Film Festival	Foxtel Audience Award	American Epic	Won	
Primetime Emmy Award	Outstanding Music Direction	The American Epic Sessions	Nominated	
Hawaii International Film Festival	Halekulani Golden Orchid Award	American Epic: Out of the Many the One	Nominated	
Tryon International Film Festival	Best Documentary	American Epic	Won	
Tryon International Film Festival	Best Overall Picture	American Epic	Won	
Focal International Awards	Best Use of Footage in a History Feature	Duke Erikson	Nominated	
Focal International Awards	Best Use of Footage in a Music Production	Duke Erikson	Nominated	

=== Filmography ===
Year	Film	Writer	Score	Producer	Appears in
2017	American Epic: The Big Bang	Yes	Yes	Yes	
2017	American Epic: Blood and Soil	Yes	Yes	Yes	
2017	American Epic: Out of the Many the One	Yes	Yes	Yes	
2017	The American Epic Sessions	Yes	Yes	Yes	Yes
