= American Epic: The Collection =

Compilation album by Various artists
- Released: May 12, 2017
- Recorded: 1916–1936
- Genre: Cajun, country, blues, folk, Hawaiian, Hispanic, Mexican, Native American, Puerto Rican, Tex-Mex
- Length: 315:57
- Label: Sony Legacy, Lo-Max

American Epic chronology
American Epic: The Collection (2017)	American Epic: The Soundtrack (2017)

American Epic: The Collection is a 100-track, 5-CD box set of American roots music performances from the 1920s and 1930s. It was compiled by film director Bernard MacMahon to accompany the release of his American Epic documentary film series. The box features 100 songs by 100 different artists and has been acclaimed by many critics as a worthy successor to the Anthology of American Folk Music and one of the best box sets to ever be released. The box set won particular acclaim for the song selection and the sound quality of the transfers of vintage 78rpm records.

== Background ==
The American Epic collection was conceived by director Bernard MacMahon during the ten years of research preparing the American Epic documentary series. “When we set out to make this set”, MacMahon explained “the first task was culling a representative sample of 100 tracks from that vast body of [1920s and 1930s] recordings. We wanted to display the phenomenal breadth of styles that were preserved and touch on the most influential artists—but, most of all, we wanted to convey the excitement and power of the music, to provide an experience that would capture the attention of other modern listeners as it did ours.” The box set was intended to be a definitive portrait of the roots recording boom of the late 20s and early 30s. It was seen by the production as an important supplementary feature to the documentary films for appreciating the breadth of the music recorded at the time and drawing attention to important artists who could not be featured in the films.

== Compilation ==
The compilation spans from 1926 to 1936 with two pre-electric recordings – the 1922 Eck Robertson recording of “Sallie Gooden” and 1916 Don Richardson recording of “Arkansas Traveler” – which the liner notes posit as being the first commercial country recording. MacMahon commented that his intention was to “to display the phenomenal breadth of styles that were preserved and touch on the most influential artists” adding that “when conflicts arose between our passion and our mission, we chose to follow our passion. We wanted to present music that was beyond time or classification, that sounded as if it could have been recorded last week, and that would startle and excite both unfamiliar and expert listeners.” The album covers a very broad range of rural and vernacular American styles; Cajun, country, blues, folk, Hawaiian, Hispanic, Mexican, Native American, Puerto Rican, Tex-Mex. MacMahon spent years listening to the catalogues of hundreds of artists from the era to whittle down the 100 songs. He made many trips to the homes of record collectors like Michael Kieffer, John Tefteller and Richard Nevins to hear very rare records that had never been reissued.

== Sequencing ==
The box set was organized by the location of the recording sessions with each of the five discs documenting a different region; The Southeast, Atlanta, New York, The Midwest, and The Deep South & The West. The album liner notes explained that the methodology “mirrors the process by which this music came to us: Robert Johnson was from Mississippi, but he traveled over much of the United States and made his recordings in Dallas and San Antonio.” The notes added that “historians often emphasize the travels of the record scouts who fanned out across the South in search of unique artists, but while recognizing and documenting those efforts, we wanted to recall that it was most often the artists themselves who traveled, sometimes thousands of miles—and that is why we know them today.”

== Restoration ==
New sound restoration techniques developed for the American Epic film production were utilized to restore the 100 songs on the album. The 78 rpm disc transfers were made by sound engineer Nicholas Bergh using ‘reverse engineering’ techniques garnered from working with the original 1920s recording equipment on The American Epic Sessions along with meticulous sound restoration undertaken by Peter Henderson and Joel Tefteller to reveal greater fidelity, presence and clarity to these early Western Electric recordings than had been heard before. Nicholas Bergh commented “the recordings in this set are special since they utilize the earliest and simplest type of electric recording equipment used for commercial studio work. As a result, they have an unrivaled immediacy to the sound.”

Some of the recordings were repressed from the original metal parts, which the production located whilst researching the films. Peter Henderson explained “in some cases we were lucky enough to get some metal parts – that’s the originals where they were cut to wax and the metal was put into the grooves and the discs were printed from those back in the ‘20s. Some of those still exist – Sony had some of them in their vaults – [but it only amounted to] 15-20 discs out of the whole.”

== Design ==
The album was housed in a black leatherette 100-page book embossed with seven red stripes representing the seven red stripes of the American flag and embossed with the image of a small wind-up Victor gramophone representing the workingman's record player. The book opened with an essay outlining the new historical information about the American Epic recordings unearthed in the film production. The book was split into five chapters with each chapter opening with a photograph of the site of a recording studio from the region the disc was profiling. Each of the 100 songs were accompanied by a portrait of the artist or promotional artwork, lyrics and a quote from either the artist or someone who knew them personally. The album featured many previously unpublished photos and images of performers who had not been seen before. It was the first time many of the lyrics had been transcribed and some of the quotes unearthed commented on performers about whom nothing had been previously known.

== Release ==
The album was released on May 12, 2017, a month prior to the broadcast of the American Epic documentary films.

== Critical reception ==
Professional ratings
Review scores
Source	Rating
Country Music	5/5 stars
Rolling Stone	Reissue of the year
PopMatters	8/10 stars
Vice (Expert Witness)	A
Tom Hull	A

The album received widespread critical acclaim for the song selection, the breadth of musical styles covered, and the sound restoration. David Fricke in Rolling Stone voted the album as a “Reissue of the Year” and wrote that it was a “must-hear story of aspiring native, immigrant and underclass voices given permanence for the first time. This soundtrack expands the film to a truly national chorale: Appalachian singers, Cajun dance bands, blues genies and Native American chanters and more. Want to hear America be great again? Drop the needle.” Greil Marcus in The Village Voice described it as “a magnificent 100-track compendium, paralleling Harry Smith’s 1952 Anthology of American Folk Music but expanding on it, with a remastering I can only call profound. Performances you might think you knew sound as if you’ve never heard them before.” Robert Christgau in Noisey gave the album an A grade and in his annual Dean's List named it his #16 album of 2017 calling it “important and indeed brilliant.” Ian Anderson in fRoots commented “you haven’t really heard these tracks at all. Not like this. The ‘reverse engineering’ transfers by Nicholas Bergh and subsequent restorations are so startlingly better, practically everything you will ever have experienced from this era can be discounted. The clarity will have you on the edge of your seat. Suddenly, legendary artists are in the room with you.” Randy Lewis in the Los Angeles Times observed that the album had achieved an “unprecedented audio fidelity.” Robert Baird in Stereophile described the album as “spectacular” and added that “what's most interesting for audiophiles is the huge improvement in the quality of the sound coming from these 78 transfers, both in the film and especially in the 5-CD boxed set of the same name.” Ed Whitelock in PopMatters wrote “album compiler and editor Bernard MacMahon has done a superb job of curating a collection that truly captures the breadth of American rural music of the 1920s (more so, even, than Smith did with his famous Anthology). American Epic: The Collection claims a comprehensiveness of representation unmatched by any other anthology of this music. For those interested in a one-stop experience of the wonder and variety that is American rural music from the 1920s, American Epic: The Collection provides an adventurous, satisfying, and ultimately definitive collection.” Blair Jackson in Acoustic Guitar summarized “this comprehensive five-disc, 100-song treasury is one of the most important compilations of its kind ever released—perhaps since Harry Smith’s seminal Anthology of American Folk Music in 1952. It’s a marvelous history lesson, but even more, it’s a glimpse into the very heart of America, as emotionally relevant today as it was nearly a century ago.”

== Track listing ==
=== Disc One: The Southeast (59:10) ===
No.	Track	Original artist	Year	Time
1	"The Coo Coo Bird"	Clarence Ashley	1929	2:58
2	“On The Road Again”	Memphis Jug Band	1928	2:51
3	“The Panama Limited”	Washington White	1930	3:12
4	“Indian War Whoop"	Hoyt Ming and His Pep Steppers	1928	3:11
5	“'Tain't Nobody's Business If I Do” (Pt. 1)	Frank Stokes	1928	3:17
6	"K. C. Railroad Blues”	Andrew and Jim Baxter	1927	3:30
7	“I Am Bound for the Promised Land”	Alfred G. Karnes	1927	3:11
8	“Cottonfield Blues (Pt. 2)”	Garfield Akers	1929	3:21
9	“I Wish I Was a Mole in the Ground”	Bascom Lamar Lunsford	1928	3:20
10	“Down On Penny's Farm”	The Bentley Boys	1929	2:48
11	“Foldin' Bed”	Whistler's Jug Band	1931	2:57
12	“Greenback Dollar”	Weems String Band	1927	3:10
13	“Tallahatchie River Blues”	Mattie Delaney	1930	2:48
14	"Walk Right In”	Cannon's Jug Stompers	1929	2:57
15	“Bury Me Under the Weeping Willow”	The Carter Family	1927	2:59
16	“Old Dog Blue”	Jim Jackson	1928	3:03
17	“Bayou Teche”	Columbus Fruge	1929	2:55
18	“Cool Drink of Water Blues”	Tommy Johnson	1928	3:34
19	“Train On the Island”	J. P. Nester	1927	3:01

=== Disc two: Atlanta (52:47) ===
No.	Track	Original artist	Year	Time
1	“My Heart Keeps Singing”	Elder J.E. Burch	1927	3:11
2	“Ninety-Nine Year Blues”	Julius Daniels	1927	3:06
3	“I Get My Whiskey From Rockingham”	Earl Johnson and His Clodhoppers	1927	3:03
4	“Death's Black Train Is Coming”	Rev. J. M. Gates	1926	3:13
5	“Waiting for a Train”	Jimmie Rodgers	1928	2:47
6	“Darling, Where Have You Been So Long?”	The Tenneva Ramblers	1928	3:24
7	“Rocky Road”	Alabama Sacred Harp Singers	1928	2:46
8	“Ma Blond Est Partie”	Amedée Breaux, Ophy Breaux & Cleoma Breaux	1929	2:51
9	“Peg and Awl”	Carolina Tar Heels	1928	2:57
10	“Chocolate to the Bone”	Barbecue Bob	1928	2:54
11	“Down on Me”	Eddie Head and Family	1930	3:09
12	“Prenez Courage”	Cléoma Breaux with Joseph Falcon and Ophy Breaux	1929	2:57
13	“Pickin' Off Peanuts”	Dilly and His Dill Pickles	1930	3:29
14	“Just Because”	Nelstone's Hawaiians	1929	2:54
15	“Dupree Blues”	Willie Walker	1930	3:30
16	“Ladies On the Steamboat”	Burnett and Rutherford	1927	3:16
17	“Mamma, 'Tain't Long Fo' Day”	Blind Willie McTell	1927	3:13

=== Disc three: New York City (63:19) ===
No.	Track	Original artist	Year	Time
1	“Cecilia”	Cuarteto Flores	1931	3:12
2	“La Cocquetera”	Los Borinquenos	1929	3:03
3	“Coconito”	Guty Cárdenas Y Lencho	1928	3:01
4	“Lovesick Blues”	Emmett Miller	1928	2:52
5	“Long Tall Mama”	Big Bill Broonzy	1932	2:51
6	“John Henry Blues”	Two Poor Boys	1931	2:49
7	“Mr. Tom Hughes' Town”	Lead Belly	1935	3:08
8	“Louis Collins”	Mississippi John Hurt	1928	3:01
9	“I Am The Light of the World”	Blind Gary Davis	1935	3:04
10	“Fifty Miles of Elbow Room”	Rev. F.W. McGee	1930	2:42
11	“Chant of the Eagle Dance”	Hopi Indian Chanters	1926	2:29
12	“Hilo Hula (Hilo Hanakahi)”	Mike Hanapi & The Ilima Islanders	1932	3:20
13	“If the River was Whiskey”	Charlie Poole and the North Carolina Ramblers	1930	3:11
14	“Stackalee”	Frank Hutchison	1927	3:07
15	“The Wreck of the '97”	Ernest Stoneman	1927	2:50
16	“Faded Coat of Blue”	Buell Kazee	1928	3:11
17	“Country Blues”	Dock Boggs	1927	3:02
18	“Sail Away Ladies”	Uncle Dave Macon and His Fruit Jar Drinkers	1927	3:00
19	“Sail Away Lady”	Uncle Bunt Stephens	1926	3:00
20	“Sallie Gooden”	A.C. (Eck) Robertson	1922	3:10
21	“Arkansas Traveller”	Don Richardson	1916	3:07

=== Disc four: The Midwest (74:08) ===
No.	Track	Original artist	Year	Time
1	“Hard Time Blues”	Lane Hardin	1935	3:20
2	“Down the Dirt Road Blues”	Charley Patton	1929	2:56
3	“Poor Boy, Long Ways from Home”	Gus Cannon	1927	3:11
4	“Hastings Street”	Blind Blake and Charlie Spand	1929	3:15
5	“See That My Grave’s Kept Clean”	Blind Lemon Jefferson	1927	2:54
6	“Gonna Have 'Lasses In the Morning”	Golden Melody Boys	1928	2:43
7	“New Orleans Stop Time”	Bumble Bee Slim and Memphis Minnie	1936	2:58
8	“Prove It On Me Blues”	Ma Rainey	1928	2:42
9	“I’m Gonne Die with My Hammer in My Hand”	Williamson Brothers and Curry	1927	3:26
10	“Last Kind Words Blues”	Geeshie Wiley	1930	3:04
11	“Banjoreno”	Dixieland Jug Blowers	1926	3:15
12	“It's a Good Thing”	Beale Street Sheiks	1927	3:00
13	“Trust in God and Do the Right”	Blind Willie Davis	1929	2:49
14	“Someday Baby Blues”	Sleepy John Estes	1935	3:02
15	“Lonesome Road Blues”	Sam Collins	1931	3:06
16	“Future Blues”	Willie Brown	1930	2:57
17	“Bull Doze Blues”	Henry Thomas “Ragtime Texas”	1928	3:29
18	“Brown Skin Gal (Down the Lane)”	Massey Family	1934	2:47
19	“Henry Lee”	Dick Justice	1929	3:26
20	“Old Country Rock”	William Moore	1928	3:02
21	“La Danseuse (The Dancer)”	Delma Lachney and Blind Uncle Gaspard	1929	2:55
22	“My Black Mama (Parts 1 & 2)”	Son House	1930	6:24
23	“Cypress Grove Blues”	Skip James	1931	3:16

=== Disc five: The Deep South and the West (66:33) ===
No.	Track	Original artist	Year	Time
1	“Cross Road Blues”	Robert Johnson	1936	2:32
2	“Mal Hombre”	Lydia Mendoza	1934	3:32
3	“Sunshine Special”	Frenchy's String Band	1928	3:11
4	“Old Jim Kinnane's”	Robert Wilkins	1935	2:54
5	“Les Blues De Voyage (Travel Blues)”	Amédé Ardoin and Dennis McGee	1934	2:57
6	“The Lost Child”	Stripling Brothers	1928	3:06
7	“I'm Gonna Cross the River Jordan Some of These Days”	Jaybird Coleman	1927	3:06
8	“Tomi Tomi”	The Aloha Serenaders Featuring Sol K. Bright	1931	2:43
9	“Sittin’ on Top of the World”	Mississippi Sheiks	1930	3:16
10	“James Alley Blues”	Richard ‘Rabbit’ Brown	1927	3:09
11	“The Indian Tom Tom”	Big Chief Henry's Indian String Band	1929	2:36
12	“Blues in a Bottle”	Prince Albert Hunt's Texas Ramblers	1928	3:25
13	“Je Me Suis En Alle”	Berthmost Montet & Joswell Dupuis	1929	2:53
14	“Dark Was the Night, Cold Was the Ground”	Blind Willie Johnson	1927	3:27
15	“E, Mama Ea”	Sol Hoʻopiʻi and His Novelty Trio	1928	3:12
16	“Ghost Dance”	Truett And George	1927	3:02
17	“Woke Up This Morning (With My Mind On Jesus)”	Roosevelt Graves and Brother	1936	2:51
18	“Allons à Lafayette”	Joseph Falcon	1928	2:57
19	“Corrido De Joaquin Murrieta (Parts 1 & 2)”	Los Madrugadores	1934	5:55
20	“Denomination Blues (Parts 1 & 2)”	Washington Phillips	1927	5:39

== Personnel ==
- Clarence Ashley: banjo, vocal (disc 1, track 1) guitar, vocal (disc 2, track 9)
- Will Shade: guitar, vocal (disc 1, track 2)
- Ben Ramey: kazoo (disc 1, track 2)
- Charlie Burse: guitar, vocal (disc 1, track 2)
- Jab Jones: jug (disc 1, track 2)
- Booker T. Washington White: vocal, guitar (disc 1, track 3)
- Hoyt Ming: fiddle (disc 1, track 4)
- Troy Ming: mandolin (disc 1, track 4)
- Rozelle Ming: guitar (disc 1, track 4)
- A. D. Coggin: calls (disc 1, track 4)
- Frank Stokes: vocal, guitar (disc 1, track 5; disc 4, track 12)
- Dan Sane: (disc 1, track 5; disc 4, track 12)
- Andrew Baxter: violin (disc 1, track 6)
- Jim Baxter: vocal, guitar (disc 1, track 6)
- Alfred G. Karnes: vocal, guitar (disc 1, track 7)
- Garfield Akers: vocal, guitar (disc 1, track 8)
- Joe Callicott: guitar (disc 1, track 8)
- Bascom Lamar Lunsford: vocal, banjo (disc 1, track 9)
- Clement Bentley: guitar (disc 1, track 10)
- Whistler (Buford Threlkeld): vocal, guitar (disc 1, track 11)
- Luther Nichols: violin (disc 1, track 11)
- Willie Black: banjo (disc 1, track 11)
- Rudolph Thompson: vocal, jug (disc 1, track 11)
- James Watts: vocal (disc 1, track 11)
- Dick Weems: fiddle (disc 1, track 12)
- Frank Weems: fiddle (disc 1, track 12)
- Alvin Conder: banjo, vocals (disc 1, track 12)
- Jesse Weems: violin, cello (disc 1, track 12)
- Mattie Delaney: vocal, guitar (disc 1, track 13)
- Gus Cannon: banjo, jug, vocal (disc 1, track 14) vocal, banjo (disc 4, track 3)
- Hosea Woods: guitar, vocal, kazoo (disc 1, track 14)
- Noah Lewis: harmonica (disc 1, track 14)
- Sara Carter: vocal, autoharp (disc 1, track 15)
- Maybelle Carter: vocal, guitar (disc 1, track 15)
- A. P. Carter: vocal (disc 1, track 15)
- Jim Jackson: vocal, guitar (disc 1, track 16)
- Columbus Fruge: vocal, accordion (disc 1, track 17)
- Tommy Johnson: vocal, guitar (disc 1, track 18)
- Charlie McCoy: guitar (disc 1, track 18)
- James Preston Nester: vocal, banjo (disc 1, track 19)
- Norman Edmonds: fiddle (disc 1, track 19)
- Josephine Crawford: vocal (disc 2, track 1)
- Elder John E Burch: vocal (disc 2, track 1)
- Triumph Church Choir: vocals (disc 2, track 1)
- Julius Daniels: guitar, vocal (disc 2, track 2)
- Earl Johnson: fiddle, vocal (disc 2, track 3)
- Emmett Bankston: banjo, vocal (disc 2, track 3)
- Lee ‘Red’ Henderson: guitar (disc 2, track 3)
- James M. Gates: vocal (disc 2, track 4)
- Jimmie Rodgers: vocal (disc 2, track 5)
- C. L. Hutchison: cornet (disc 2, track 5)
- James Rickard: clarinet (disc 2, track 5)
- John Westbrook: steel guitar (disc 2, track 5)
- Dean Bryan: guitar (disc 2, track 5)
- George MacMillan: string bass (disc 2, track 5)
- Claude Grant: guitar, vocals (disc 2, track 6)
- Jack Grant: mandolin (disc 2, track 6)
- Jack Pierce: fiddle (disc 2, track 6)
- Claude Slagle: banjo (disc 2, track 6)
- Thomas Jackson Denson: lead vocal tenor (disc 2, track 7)
- Seaborn Denson: bass (disc 2, track 7)
- Jerusha Henrietta Denson-Edwards: alto (disc 2, track 7)
- Aunt Annie: soprano (disc 2, track 7)
- Whit Denson: tenor (disc 2, track 7)
- J. C. Brown: vocal (disc 2, track 7)
- Amedée Breaux: accordion, vocal (disc 2, track 8)
- Ophy Breaux: fiddle (disc 2, track 8 & 12)
- Cléoma Breaux: guitar (disc 2, track 8 & 12; disc 5, track 18)
- Dock Walsh: banjo, vocal (disc 2, track 9)
- Garley Foster: harmonica, guitar (disc 2, track 9)
- Barbecue Bob: vocal, guitar (disc 2, track 10)
- Eddie Head: vocals (disc 2, track 11)
- Joseph Falcon: accordion (disc 2, track 12) vocal, accordion (disc 5, track 18)
- John Dilleshaw: speaking, guitar (disc 2, track 13)
- Harry Kiker: fiddle (disc 2, track 13)
- Shorty Lindsay: tenor banjo, speaking (disc 2, track 13)
- Pink Lindsey: string bass, speaking (disc 2, track 13)
- Hubert A. Nelson: steel guitar, vocal (disc 2, track 14)
- James D. Touchstone: guitar, vocal (disc 2, track 14)
- Willie Walker: vocal, guitar (disc 2, track 15)
- Sam Brooks: guitar, vocal (disc 2, track 15)
- Leonard Rutherford: fiddle (disc 2, track 16)
- Richard D. Burnett: banjo, vocal effect (disc 2, track 16)
- Blind Willie McTell: vocal, guitar (disc 2, track 17)
- Diosa Costello: vocal (disc 3, track 1)
- Enrique: group member (disc 3, track 1)
- Cándido: group member (disc 3, track 1)
- Lara: group member (disc 3, track 1)
- A. Baldrich: musical director (disc 3, track 2)
- Guty Cárdenas: vocal, guitar (disc 3, track 3)
- Lencho: vocal, guitar (disc 3, track 3)
- Emmett Miller: vocal (disc 3, track 4)
- Dan Fitch: vocal (disc 3, track 4)
- Leo McConville: trumpet (disc 3, track 4)
- Tommy Dorsey: trombone (disc 3, track 4)
- Jimmy Dorsey: clarinet, alto sax (disc 3, track 4)
- Arthur Schutt: piano (disc 3, track 4)
- Eddie Lang: guitar (disc 3, track 4)
- Stan King: drums (disc 3, track 4)
- Big Bill Broonzy: vocals, guitar (disc 3, track 5)
- Joe Evans: vocal, guitar or mandolin (disc 3, track 6)
- Arthur McClain: vocal, guitar or mandolin (disc 3, track 6)
- Lead Belly: vocal, guitar (disc 3, track 7)
- Mississippi John Hurt: vocals, guitar (disc 3, track 8)
- Blind Gary Davis: vocal, guitar (disc 3, track 9)
- Rev. F.W. McGee: vocal (disc 3, track 10)
- Kotsheptiwa: vocal (disc 3, track 11)
- Salaptotsi: vocal (disc 3, track 11)
- Si’tala: vocal (disc 3, track 11)
- Qömakwaptiwa: vocal (disc 3, track 11)
- Pongya: vocal (disc 3, track 11)
- Mike Hanapi: vocal, steel guitar (disc 3, track 12)
- Bob Nawahine: vocal, bass (disc 3, track 12)
- David Burrows: steel guitar (disc 3, track 12)
- Dave Munson: vocal, rhythm guitar (disc 3, track 12)
- Charlie Poole: vocal, banjo (disc 3, track 13)
- Odell Smith: fiddle (disc 3, track 13)
- Roy Harvey: guitar (disc 3, track 13)
- Frank Hutchison: vocals, guitar, harmonica (disc 3, track 14)
- Ernest V. Stoneman: vocal, guitar (disc 3, track 15)
- Kahle Brewer: fiddle (disc 3, track 15)
- Bolen Frost: banjo (disc 3, track 15)
- Buell Kazee: vocal (disc 3, track 16)
- Bert Hirsch: fiddle (disc 3, track 16)
- Carson Robison: guitar (disc 3, track 16)
- Dock Boggs: vocal, banjo (disc 3, track 17)
- Uncle Dave Macon: vocal, banjo (disc 3, track 18)
- Sam McGee: guitar, vocal (disc 3, track 18)
- Kirk McGee: fiddle, vocal (disc 3, track 18)
- Mazy Todd: fiddle (disc 3, track 18)
- “Uncle” Bunt Stephens: fiddle (disc 3, track 19)
- Eck Robertson: fiddle (disc 3, track 20)
- Don Richardson: violin (disc 3, track 21)
- Lane Hardin: vocal, guitar (disc 4, track 1)
- Charley Patton: vocal, guitar (disc 4, track 2)
- Blind Blake: guitar (disc 4, track 3) speaking, guitar (disc 4, track 4)
- Charlie Spand: piano (disc 4, track 4)
- Blind Lemon Jefferson: vocal, guitar (disc 4, track 5)
- Dempsey Jones: ukulele, vocal (disc 4, track 6)
- Phil Featherstone: mandolin (disc 4, track 6)
- Bumble Bee Slim: vocal (disc 4, track 7)
- Memphis Minnie: vocal, guitar (disc 4, track 7)
- Black Bob: piano (disc 4, track 7)
- Ma Rainey: vocal (disc 4, track 8)
- Georgia Tom Dorsey: piano (disc 4, track 8)
- Martell Pettiford: banjo (disc 4, track 8)
- Herman Brown: kazoo, washboard, drum (disc 4, track 8)
- Carl Reid: jug (disc 4, track 8)
- Ervin Williamson: vocal, guitar (disc 4, track 9)
- Arnold Williamson: vocal, fiddle (disc 4, track 9)
- Arnold Curry: banjo (disc 4, track 9)
- Kirk: backing vocals (disc 4, track 9)
- Geeshie Wiley: vocal, guitar (disc 4, track 10)
- Earl McDonald: jug (disc 4, track 11)
- Henry Clifford: jug (disc 4, track 11)
- Clifford Hayes: violin (disc 4, track 11)
- Lockwood Lewis: alto saxophone (disc 4, track 11)
- Cal Smith: banjo (disc 4, track 11)
- Freddie Smith: banjo (disc 4, track 11
- Curtis Hayes: banjo (disc 4, track 11)
- Blind Willie Davis: vocals, guitar (disc 4, track 13)
- Sleepy John Estes: vocal (disc 4, track 14)
- Hammie Nixon: harmonica (disc 4, track 14)
- Sam Collins: vocal, guitar (disc 4, track 15)
- Willie Brown: vocal, guitar (disc 4, track 16)
- Henry Thomas “Ragtime Texas”: guitar, vocal, reed pipes (disc 4, track 17)
- Curt Massey: fiddle (disc 4, track 18)
- Larry Wellington: accordion, piano (disc 4, track 18)
- Milt Mabie: string bass (disc 4, track 18)
- Dick Justice: vocal, guitar (disc 4, track 19)
- William Moore: guitar, vocal (disc 4, track 20)
- Delma Lachney: fiddle (disc 4, track 21)
- Blind Uncle Gaspard: guitar (disc 4, track 21)
- Son House: vocal, guitar (disc 4, track 22)
- Skip James: vocal, guitar (disc 4, track 23)
- Robert Johnson: vocal, guitar (disc 5, track 1)
- Lydia Mendoza: vocal, guitar (disc 5, track 2)
- Polite ‘Frenchy’ Christian: cornet (disc 5, track 3)
- Percy Darensbourg: banjo (disc 5, track 3)
- Robert (Tim) Wilkins: vocal, guitar (disc 5, track 4)
- Son Joe (Ernest Lawlers): guitar (disc 5, track 4)
- Kid Spoons’: spoons (disc 5, track 4)
- Amédée Ardoin: accordion, vocal (disc 5, track 5)
- Dennis McGee: fiddle (disc 5, track 5)
- Charles Stripling: fiddle (disc 5, track 6)
- Ira Stripling: guitar (disc 5, track 6)
- Jaybird Coleman: vocal (disc 5, track 7)
- Sol K. Bright: vocal, steel guitar (disc 5, track 8)
- Ray Kinney: vocal, ukulele (disc 5, track 8)
- Walter Vinson: guitar, vocal (disc 5, track 9)
- Lonnie Chatman violin (disc 5, track 9)
- Richard ‘Rabbit’ Brown: guitar, vocals (disc 5, track 10)
- Henry Hall: fiddle (disc 5, track 11)
- Harold Hall: vocal (disc 5, track 11)
- Clarence Hall: guitar (disc 5, track 11)
- Archie ‘Prince’ Albert Hunt: fiddle, vocal (disc 5, track 12)
- Oscar Harper: guitar (disc 5, track 12)
- Berthmost Montet: accordion, vocal (disc 5, track 13)
- Joswell Dupuis: guitar (disc 5, track 13)
- Blind Willie Johnson: guitar, vocals (disc 5, track 14)
- Sol Ho’opi’i: vocal, steel guitar (disc 5, track 15)
- Lani McIntire: guitar (disc 5, track 15)
- Glenwood Leslie: ukulele (disc 5, track 15)
- Velma Truett: guitar (disc 5, track 16)
- Harry George: guitar (disc 5, track 16)
- Roosevelt Graves: guitar (disc 5, track 17)
- Uaroy Graves: tambourine, vocals (disc 5, track 17)
- Víctor Sánchez: vocal, guitar (disc 5, track 19)
- Fernando Linares: vocal, guitar (disc 5, track 19)
- Washington Phillips: vocal, unknown instrument (disc 5, track 20)
- Bernard MacMahon: editor, compiler, producer
- Nicholas Bergh: 78 rpm transfers, mastering
- Peter Henderson: restoration, mastering, producer
- Duke Erikson: restoration, mastering, producer
- Joel Tefteller: restoration, mastering
- John Polito: mastering
- Ellis Burman: mastering
- Allison McGourty: producer
- Adam Block: producer
- Patrick Ferris: associate producer
- Jack McLean: associate producer
- Nat Strimpopulos: artwork
