= American Epic: The Soundtrack =

2017 soundtrack album by various artists

Soundtrack album by Various artists
- Released: May 12, 2017
- Recorded: 1927–2014
- Genre: Cajun, country, blues, folk, Hawaiian, Native American, Tex-Mex
- Length: 44:22
- Label: Lo-Max, Sony Legacy

American Epic chronology
American Epic: The Collection (2017)	American Epic: The Soundtrack (2017)	Music from The American Epic Sessions (2017)

American Epic: The Soundtrack is the soundtrack of the 2017 documentary film American Epic. The album features the 15 musical highlights from the documentary series recorded between 1927 and 2014.

== Background ==
The album was compiled by the American Epic film producers and co-writers Allison McGourty, Duke Erikson and director Bernard MacMahon to provide a brief overview of the music featured in the documentary series. The album features 13 songs recorded in the 1920s and 30s, an early 1960s gospel performance by Sister Rosetta Tharpe and a recording made for the film featuring the grandchildren of Amédée Breaux performing his song "Jole Blon" on the same instruments he and his brothers recorded it on in 1929. The album shares a number of selections with the 5-CD box set American Epic: The Collection.

== Restoration ==
New sound restoration techniques developed for the American Epic film series were utilized to restore the thirteen 1920s and 30s recordings on the album. The 78rpm record transfers were made by sound engineer Nicholas Bergh using reverse engineering techniques garnered from working with the restored first electrical sound recording system from the 1920s in The American Epic Sessions. This was followed by meticulous sound restoration by sound engineers Peter Henderson and Joel Tefteller to reveal greater fidelity, presence and clarity to these 1920s and 1930s recordings than had been heard before. Some of the recordings were repressed from the original metal parts, located whilst researching the films. Henderson explained, "in some cases we were lucky enough to get some metal parts – that's the originals where they were cut to wax and the metal was put into the grooves and the discs were printed from those back in the '20s. Some of those still exist – Sony had some of them in their vaults."

== Release ==
The album was released on May 12, 2017, a month prior to the broadcast of the American Epic documentary films. The album issued on vinyl, CD, and download.

== Critical reception ==
Professional ratings
Review scores
Source	Rating
Vice (Expert Witness)	A

Robert Christgau in Noisey awarded the album an A grade and made it his number 5 Album of the Year. He described it as "a terrific new anthology of American folk music," and praised the compilation's ethnic and gender diversity writing "if this be political correctness, bring it on." The restoration work was described by Greil Marcus in The Village Voice as "re-mastering I can only call profound. Performances you might think you knew sound as if you've never heard them before — never apprehended them." Ian Anderson in fRoots, reviewing the restoration wrote "you haven't really heard these tracks at all. Not like this. Forget bad dubs of worn-out 78s pressed on poor vinyl. The 'reverse engineering' transfers by Nicholas Bergh and subsequent restorations are so startlingly better, practically everything you will ever have experienced from this era can be discounted and CD is the best way to hear them. The clarity of group recordings where every instrument is well defined, and of solo artists where their instruments and voices suddenly sound real, will have you on the edge of your seat. And there's none of that fog of 78 surface noise which many people find too much of a distraction: suddenly, legendary artists are in the room with you".

== Track listing ==
No.	Title	Original Artist and year	Length
1.	"Gonna Die with My Hammer in My Hand"	Williamson Brothers & Curry 1927	3:25
2.	"On The Road Again"	Memphis Jug Band 1928	2:50
3.	"Frankie"	Mississippi John Hurt 1928	3:28
4.	"Bury Me Under the Weeping Willow"	The Carter Family 1928	2:59
5.	"Mal Hombre"	Lydia Mendoza 1930	3:32
6.	"Peg and Awl"	The Carolina Tar Heels 1929	2:57
7.	"Tomi Tomi"	Sol K. Bright with the Aloha Serenaders 1930	2:43
8.	"Indian Tom Tom"	Big Chief Henry's Indian String Band 1929	2:36
9.	"Cocaine Habit Blues"	Hattie Hart and the Memphis Jug Band 1930	2:51
10.	"Up Above My Head"	Sister Rosetta Tharpe 1960s	2:58
11.	"Down the Dirt Road Blues"	Charley Patton 1929	2:56
12.	"Allons à Lafayette"	Joe Falcon 1928	2:57
13.	"Stackalee"	Frank Hutchison 1927	3:06
14.	"Waiting for a Train"	Jimmie Rodgers 1929	2:47
15.	"Jole Blon"	The Breaux Brothers with Louis Michot 2014	2:09
Total length:			44:22

== Personnel ==
- Ervin Williamson – vocals, guitar (track 1)
- Arnold Williamson – vocals, fiddle (track 1)
- Arnold Curry – banjo (track 1)
- Kirk – backing vocals (track 1)
- Will Shade – guitar, vocal (track 2) harmonica (track 9)
- Ben Ramey – kazoo (track 2), kazoo, vocal (track 9)
- Charlie Burse – guitar, vocals (track 2) guitar (track 9)
- Jab Jones – jug (track 2)
- Mississippi John Hurt – vocals, guitar (track 3)
- Sara Carter – vocals, autoharp (track 4)
- Maybelle Carter: vocal, guitar (track 4)
- A. P. Carter – vocals (track 4)
- Lydia Mendoza – vocals, guitar (track 5)
- Dock Walsh – banjo, vocals (track 6)
- Clarence Ashley – guitar, vocals (track 6)
- Garley Foster – harmonica, guitar (track 6)
- Sol K. Bright – vocals, steel guitar (track 7)
- Ray Kinney – vocals, ukulele (track 7)
- Henry Hall – fiddle (track 8)
- Harold Hall – vocals (track 8)
- Clarence Hall – guitar (track 8)
- Hattie Hart – vocals (track 9)
- Hambone Lewis – jug (track 9)
- Sister Rosetta Tharpe – vocals, guitar (track 10)
- Olivet Institutional Baptist Church Choir – handclaps
- Charley Patton – vocals, guitar (track 11)
- Joseph Falcon – vocals, accordion (track 12)
- Cléoma Breaux – guitar (track 12)
- Frank Hutchison – vocals, guitar, harmonica (track 13)
- Jimmie Rodgers – vocals (track 14)
- C. L. Hutchison – cornet (track 14)
- James Rickard – clarinet (track 14)
- John Westbrook – steel guitar (track 14)
- Dean Bryan – guitar (track 14)
- George MacMillan – string bass (track 14)
- Pat Breaux – accordion (track 15)
- Gary Breaux – accordion (track 15)
- Jimmy Breaux – accordion (track 15)
- Louis Michot – vocals, fiddle (track 15)
- Ann Savoy – guitar (track 15)
- Ashlee Michot – tit-fer (track 15)
- Allison McGourty – compiler, producer, liner notes, music supervisor
- Bernard MacMahon – compiler, producer
- Duke Erikson – compiler, producer, mastering
- Nicholas Bergh – 78 rpm transfers, mastering
- Peter Henderson – restoration, mastering, producer
- Joel Tefteller – restoration, mastering
- John Polito – mastering
- Ellis Burman – mastering
- Patrick Ferris – associate producer
- Jack McLean – associate producer
- Nat Strimpopulos – artwork
