= American Epic (film series) =

- Theatrical release poster
- Written by: Bernard MacMahon; Allison McGourty; Duke Erikson
- Directed by: Bernard MacMahon
- Music by: Bernard MacMahon; Duke Erikson
- Country of origin: United States
- Original language: English

Production
- Producers: Allison McGourty; Duke Erikson; Bernard MacMahon
- Cinematography: Vern Moen
- Editors: Dan Gitlin; Gillian McCarthy; Brittonya Sanden
- Running time: 310 minutes (theatrical version)
- Production companies: Lo-Max Films, Wildwood Enterprises

Original release
- Network: BBC; PBS
- Release: May 16 – June 6, 2017

American Epic is a documentary film series about the first recordings of roots music in the United States during the 1920s and their cultural, social and technological impact on North America and the world. Directed and co-written by Bernard MacMahon, the story is told through twelve ethnically and musically diverse musicians who auditioned for and participated in these pioneering recording sessions: The Carter Family, the Memphis Jug Band, Elder J.E. Burch, The Williamson Brothers, Dick Justice, Charley Patton, The Hopi Indian Chanters, Joseph Kekuku, Lydia Mendoza, the Breaux Family, Mississippi John Hurt and Blind Willie Johnson. The film series is the core of the American Epic media franchise, which includes several related works.

The film series was created, written and produced by MacMahon, Allison McGourty and Duke Erikson. It was first broadcast on May 16, 2017, in the United States and was narrated by Robert Redford. The film was the result of ten years of intensive field research and postulated a radically new take on American history, namely that America was democratized through the invention of electrical sound recording and the subsequent auditions the record labels held across North America in the late 1920s, which were open to every ethnic minority and genre of music. The films contained many previously untold stories, a vast amount of previously unseen and extremely rare archival footage and dramatically advanced audio restorations of the 1920s and 1930s recordings.

MacMahon decided all the interviewees had to personally have known the long-deceased subjects of the films, and these interviews were conducted on the location where the musicians had lived, accompanied by panoramic tracking shots of the geographical locations both present and vintage to give a sense of the wildly varied North American landscape and its influence on the music. During pre-production, when MacMahon presented his vision for the films and the archival footage to Robert Redford at their first meeting, Redford pronounced it "America's greatest untold story."

The film series received a number of awards, including the Foxtel Audience Award at the 2016 Sydney Film Festival and the Discovery Award at the 2016 Calgary International Film Festival. It was nominated for a Primetime Emmy. On April 23, 2018, the Focal International Awards nominated American Epic for Best Use of Footage in a History Feature and Best Use of Footage in a Music Production. Many critics have cited the American Epic films as being one of the best music documentaries ever made.

== Episodes ==
In the Roaring Twenties two worlds collided: one Southern, rural and traditional; the other Northern, urban, and industrial. America was in motion. Record companies sent scouts across the United States, searching for new artists and sounds. They traveled to remote regions, auditioned thousands of everyday Americans, and issued their music on phonograph records. It was the first time America heard itself. The artists they discovered shaped our world. Here, are some of their stories ...

— Robert Redford, from episode one

No.	Title	Original release date
1	"The Big Bang"	May 16, 2017
Overview; The first episode shows how the music industry in the 1920s was revolutionized when radio began to take over the music business. As wealthy people in the major cities turned to their radios rather than buying records, the record companies were forced to leave their studios in the urban centers in search of new rural markets to sell records to and new styles of music to sell to them. They brought the newly-invented first electrical recording machine that for the first time allowed them to record all genres of music. From the Appalachian Mountains, to the ghettos of Memphis, and the Louisiana Bayous to the Texas plains, the record labels discovered an extraordinary range of new talent. The auditions were open to all the ethnic groups of the United States and the recordings they made gave a voice to everyone and democratized the nation. The first film examines two wildly contrasting acts that were discovered in Tennessee during the first wave of electrical field recording sessions in 1927 by Ralph Peer – one who launched country music and the other inspired rhythm and blues. A.P., Maybelle, and Sara Carter The Carter Family; In a poor rural Virginia community, A. P. Carter persuades his young wife, Sara Carter, and nine-month pregnant cousin, Maybelle Carter, to make a hazardous journey to Bristol, Tennessee to audition for a recording session with Victor Records A&R man, Ralph Peer in 1927. They audition along with Jimmie Rodgers and Maybelle describes how they recorded onto wax discs on a pulley-driven Scully lathe accompanied by the first-ever film footage of a 1920's electrical recording session. Although Peer mocks the group for their appearance claiming they were "dressed in rags", the records they make invent modern country music and create the most important group in country music history, spawning one of America's greatest musical dynasties – Chet Atkins, June Carter Cash, Rosanne Cash, Carlene Carter, Marty Stuart and Johnny Cash who performs with Sara and Maybelle Carter and christens the Bristol Sessions the "Big Bang of country music." Memphis Jug Band That same year, Ralph Peer takes the new electrical recording system to Memphis, Tennessee and sets up a makeshift studio just off the bustling black ghetto of Beale Street. There, a collective of wild street musicians, led by Will Shade, invent their own instruments out of household objects, including a jug which when blown provides a heavy rhythmic bass tone. They form the first-ever black pop group, the Memphis Jug Band and employ a wide variety of songs-styles in their repertoire. When Peer records them, their records sell extraordinarily well and are very influential. Nas demonstrates how the Memphis Jug Band created the blueprint for hip hop by performing their 1928 song "On the Road Again." Peer hires Will Shade to become his A&R man in Memphis, who brings him the best talent, including artists like Memphis Minnie, Gus Cannon, and Furry Lewis, solidifying Memphis as a music recording hub. By the late 1940s, the Memphis Jug Band has slid into obscurity and Will Shade is living in abject poverty. He is tracked down by young Charlie Musselwhite who becomes Shade's musical protégé. Shade teaches Musselwhite guitar and harmonica and still dreams of having another shot at a recording career, while the Memphis acts he helped inspire like Elvis Presley are topping the charts. Musselwhite ruminates on Shade's profound influence on American music and closes the film by performing an unreleased song Will Shade taught him, "I'll Get a Break Someday".
2	"Blood and Soil"	May 23, 2017
Overview; The second episode explores the social impact of the first electrical recordings. It focuses on three musicians whose stories were mysteries prior to the film's release, and the huge influence their recordings had on contemporary music. Elder J.E. Burch; A mesmerizing gospel choir performance recorded by Ralph Peer in 1927 led by an unknown preacher sends director Bernard MacMahon on a search through the Sony Archives for any clue as to whom the mysterious clergyman was and what became of him. There he finds an original recording sheet with one fragment of information, an address that simply states Cheeraw [sic], South Carolina. He travels to Cheraw, SC, and uncovers the story of an extraordinary African-American trailblazer, Elder John E. Burch, an early founder of the NAACP, whose Sanctified Triumph Church united the black and white residents of that sleepy South Carolina town. Members of Burch's congregation who haven't seen him in seventy years recall the impact of his music as if it was yesterday and reveal that Burch's church was regularly visited a young Dizzy Gillespie who was inspired by Burch to pursue a career in music and invent bebop and says "I received my first experience with rhythm and spiritual transport going down there to Elder Burch's Church every Sunday, and I've just followed it ever since." A choir from the Triumph churches across America descends on the humble South Carolina church where the current pastor, Donnie Chapman, leads the townsfolk, and the choir, in a rafter-raising performance of Elder Burch's hymn "My Heart Keeps Singing". The Williamson Brothers, Dick Justice and Frank Hutchison; When West Virginia mine bosses open fire on striking Irish and African-American workers, one of them vows to escape his indentured servitude by auditioning for a recording talent contest. Frank Hutchison, a coal miner in Logan, West Virginia, lands a recording contract for Okeh Records, and uses his success to get two of his fellow coal miners, Ervin Williamson and Dick Justice, auditions with Okeh and Brunswick Records. Hutchison makes the first recording of "Stacker Lee" and Justice records an 18th century English ballad "Henry Lee". The Williamson Brothers travel by train to New Orleans in 1927 with the countryside around them underwater during the Great Mississippi Flood. When they arrive at the studio they record the first John Henry song, "I'm Gonna Die With My Hammer In My Hand". They all find brief salvation from the hardships of the mines through their recording trips, before eventually succumbing to the adverse health effects of their punishing life underground. After their deaths, Justice's son said his father never told him he made records, Ervin Williamson's son, Bill, becomes emotional imagining how proud his dad would have been to know his music was being kept alive by artists today like Bruce Springsteen who closes the story by performing "I'm Gonna Die With My Hammer In My Hand." Son House Charley Patton The Rolling Stones appear on Shindig! and introduce their "greatest idol", Howlin' Wolf whose feral performance is the highlight of the show. Wolf explains "how'd I start to make records? It was plowing. Plowing full mule on the plantation." He recalls "a man come through there picking the guitar called Charley Patton. And I liked his sound. Every night that I'd get off of work, I'd go over to his house, and he'd learn me how to pick the guitar." The film travels to the remote Dockery Plantation in the Mississippi Delta where Wolf had worked. There in the late 1920s, H. C. Speir, an enterprising talent scout, auditions the Dockery sharecroppers and uncovers a goldmine of talent, whose leader was a boisterous singer and guitarist named Charley Patton. Two young relatives of Patton, Kenny and Tracy Cannon, visit the plantation where they engage in an uneasy conversation with Dockery's current overseer, Bill Lester, who jovially tells them stories about the music scene Patton inspired whilst un-ironically referring to "the captive audience" Patton had at the plantation. Patton's relatives speculate on the suffering their relatives endured on the plantation and how blues music for African Americans was an outlet for that pain, commenting that "we've always found a way to scream through the music". With his gravelly voice and percussive guitar playing, Patton ushered in a wave of Delta blues musicians, including Howlin' Wolf, Robert Johnson, Robert Lockwood Jr., Tommy Johnson, Pops Staples, Son House, and David "Honeyboy" Edwards who is seen performing on a street corner in some very early film footage from 1942. This dissolves to a 91-year-old Honeyboy explaining that Patton was part Native American. He is joined by 96-year-old Homesick James who fondly recalls watching Patton perform outside at a fish-fry. "I see all the dust jumping and flying. It was Charley Patton, making all that noise. Charley was something, yes he was." Honeyboy explains how Patton drank a lot of "white whiskey" and would "break up his own dances" fighting with the audience. 91-year-old Robert Lockwood Jr. joins them and performs "Love in Vain" composed by his mentor, and Patton protégé, Robert Johnson. The three oldest blues musicians in the world conclude that the unique resonant voice the Delta blues musicians possessed was from "hollering at that mule all day long". "You catch some white boys they can sing good" Honeyboy adds "but just a few of them". "They never plowed a mule" Homesick concludes, "and that's what makes the voices." The year after Patton's death in 1934, Robert Johnson records the most influential blues records of all time. Bill Lester explains that when mechanization came to the plantations the workforce left for the major cities like Chicago on the Great Migration. There, musicians schooled by Patton at Dockery like Howlin' Wolf brought this music to a new generation. Patton's enormous influence is assessed by Taj Mahal and Howlin' Wolf closes the story performing "Down in the Bottom."
3	"Out of the Many, the One"	May 30, 2017
Overview; The third episode explores the panorama of ethnic music recorded during the 1920s and 1930s recording sessions and the influence it had on music across the globe. Hopi Indian Chanters; Two Hopi priests, Leigh Kuwanwisiwma and Elmer J. Satala explain that their sacred songs are essential to the survival of their people and bring rain to the harsh environment of northern Arizona. The film relates how in 1904 a Caucasian boy, Milo Billingsley, runs away from the family farm in Iowa to live with the Hopi people and becomes a friend and messenger to the highest Hopi priests. In 1913 Teddy Roosevelt visits the Hopi and observes their most sacred ritual, the snake dance. Unbeknownst to the Hopi, the ritual is secretly filmed and the ensuing publicity brings a flood of unwanted tourists to Hopi. Satala explains that the Hopi's rituals are eroded if they are made public. In 1926 the United States Congress propose a bill to ban the snake dance. "They targeted these major ceremonies", Kuwanwisiwma explains "by legislation to ban them. Because the government couldn't break the Hopi people unless they break the culture." To prevent this, Billingsley takes a delegation of Hopi priests to New York to make a recording of their sacred songs for Victor Records in 1926 to demonstrate that they are not a threat to the public. The Hopi then travel to Washington, D.C. where they are booked to perform in front of the Capitol. Kuwanwisiwma speculates that they "performed several ceremonies to demonstrate that the Hopi way of life is always about peace and happiness. I'm not too certain if they actually did the Snake Dance. They may have borrowed from another non-sensitive ceremony and may have used that, too." The filmmakers show Kuwanwisiwma never-before-seen footage of the 1926 event at the Capitol and he is visibly distraught to see the Hopi priests performed "the actual private ceremony" of the snake dance in front of thousands of people at the Capitol. He reflects that it is very "sad to see that the Hopis had to go up to that level of actually presenting a very private dance to tell others that this is the Hopi way. They had no choice. They should never have to do that." It is revealed that the songs the Hopi recorded in New York became big sellers over the decades for Victor Records and although the whole endeavor was fraught with major religious dilemmas for the tribe, Kuwanwisiwma reveals that the recordings are still played on Hopi radio today and that the Hopi's composition of sacred songs is still going strong. Joseph Kekuku; Arriving on the shores of Hawaii accompanied by an archival filmed performance of steel guitarist Sol Hoʻopiʻi, it is revealed that in the early part of the 20th century Hawaiian groups toured the world with the steel guitar and the extraordinary influence it had on popular music around the world. This is illustrated by performances by delta blues guitarist Son House, country musician Hank Williams, Nigerian Jùjú musician King Sunny Adé and rock group Pink Floyd, all performing with the steel guitar. On the coast of Oahu, Alyssabeth Kahuini Kinilani Archambault introduces herself as a relative of the inventor of the steel guitar – Joseph Kekuku. Walking along the railroad tracks in Honolulu with his guitar, an eleven-year-old Joseph Kekuku notices a carriage bolt glinting from between the railroad ties. He picks it up and runs it across the strings of his guitar. The sound it makes captures his imagination and the repairs to Kamehameha School's metal shop where he perfects a steel bar that can slide up the strings of a guitar creating a unique soaring sound or glissando. His niece Ka'iwa Meyer explains that soon the whole island is swept up by his invention and steel guitars are being played all over the islands. In 1904 Kekuku sails to the mainland and joins Toots Paka's Hawaiian troupe and they tour North America. In 1915 Kekuku performs at the Panama–Pacific International Exposition in San Francisco, which is attended by over 17 million visitors. Audiences are mesmerized by Kekuku's instrument and by 1916 Hawaiian music is the most popular music genre on record in the United States. Kekuku's touring takes him all over the Deep South where delta blues musicians and country bands incorporate the steel guitar into their music. In 1919 Kekuku sails to London with the Hawaiian revue The Bird of Paradise, the show is a worldwide hit and inspires an international craze for Hawaiian music. When Kekuku returns to the US in 1927 he discovers a new wave of Hawaiian groups are enjoying national success like Kalama's Quartet who are seen performing in a 1927 film clip. Moving to the present day, a bronze statue of Kekuku is being unveiled in his hometown of La'ie, Oahu and a luau is held in his honor with prominent musicians from the island and family members. Kekuku was thought to have never been commercially recorded, but the filmmakers discovered a recording he made in London in 1926 and play it for the gathering who are amazed to hear his steel guitar playing for the first time. "I was so taken back to hear my great-uncle recorded" says Archambault. Cyril Pahinui observes "I gotta give Uncle Joe credit. If it wasn't for him, we might not have steel guitar. I feel proud that I am passing on this history of our steel guitar. So our kids, they're making their own steel guitar." As the group play a lilting Hawaiian song on steel guitar, one of the small children at the luau asks Archambault "what did it [Kekuku's guitar] sound like?" "it sounds like that" she replies pointing to the steel guitarist, "that is the sound of Hawaii." Lydia Mendoza Lydia Mendoza; Travelling along the rugged plains of Texas a passionate hybrid music called Tejano has developed out of centuries of conflict along the Texas-Mexican border. Arriving in San Antonio at the home of the Hernandez family, they explain how their grandmother, Lydia Mendoza, was born in 1916 into a musical "Mexican gypsy troupe". Lydia's father drank heavily, often mistreating Lydia and christened their group Cuarteto Carta Blanca after a popular beer. In 1928 the group successfully auditioned for Tommy Rockwell, a scout for Okeh Records, and cut some records. When they didn't sell, the group went back to entertaining the migrant workers which involved regularly crossing the Mexico–United States border. The US border guards would make young Lydia wash her hair in gasoline and, as the family explains, "viewed the Mexicans as a sub-culture and treated them like that." In 1934 Manuel J. Cortez, a radio presenter sees Lydia performing in the Plaza de Zacate and invites her to participate in a talent contest on his radio program. She wins by 35,000 votes attracting the interest of Eli Oberstein from Bluebird Records. He organizes a session with Lydia at the Texas Hotel in 1934 where she records "Mal Hombre", a passionate emancipatory tango about a cold-hearted man. The record is a huge hit and Lydia becomes an iconic and inspirational figure for Mexican Americans who named her "La Cancionera de Los Pobres" ("The Songstress of the Poor"). Her granddaughter explains, "being in that Hispanic culture, it was hard for a woman to stand on her own. But she was her own person. And she did it." The family describes watching her designing and sewing her stage costumes with sequins littered over the floor, and display one of the dramatic capes she designed. With the onset of World War II, Lydia withdraws from show business to raise a family and is seen in rare home movies performing at family gatherings. Her granddaughter explains, "she stayed home for a few years. Because in the culture that's how we are, we're very close family, very loving." The family shows her composition books filled with her lyrics and sketches for her stage costumes. After the war Lydia resumes touring and records over 200 songs and starts to receive national recognition for her contribution to Mexican American culture resulting in an invitation to perform at the Inauguration of Jimmy Carter in 1977. President Bill Clinton is seen in 1999 presenting Lydia with the National Medal of Arts and saying "with the artistry of her voice and the gift of her songs she bridged the gap between generations and culture. Lydia Mendoza is a true American pioneer and she paved the way for a whole new generation of Latino performers who today are making all Americans sing." In 2013 the United States Postal Service issued a commemorative stamp in her honor. Her grandson asks, "how many people can say that they washed their hair with gasoline at the border and yet been acknowledged by the President of the United States, been recognized for your life's work?" His sister concludes, "no one in this world has a story like that." The Breaux Family; Entering the winding leafy swamps of the Louisiana Bayou where French-speaking Acadians forced out of Eastern Canada, blended old French songs with music from Spain, Germany, Africa, the local Native Americans to create a unique musical – Cajun. Louis Michot explains that "Cajun music has always been passed down through the families. Cajun music really resembles the landscape from which it's born. The bayous are very crooked and winding and slow – just like the music can be very unconventional. It's not square. We call it "croche". It means "crooked", and it doesn't resemble any other music." Recorded Cajun music begins with the Breaux family - the guitarist and singer Cléoma Breaux, her brothers Amédée, Ophy, and Clifford, and her husband, Joe Falcon. Columbia Records talent scout Frank Walker reveals how in 1928, he decided to expand the label's repertoire and explore the area around Lafayette, Louisiana where he is "astounded at the interest that there was in their little Saturday night dances. A single singer would have a little concertina-type instrument and a one-string fiddle and a triangle, those were the instruments, but they would always have a singer and of course they sang in Cajun." He organizes a field recording session where Joe Falcon, Cleoma Breaux, and Ophy Breaux record the first Cajun song "Allons à Lafayette". Falcon recalls that Walker and the record label "they kinda laugh, you know? So, they say, how, how many records would you ... order? He said, 500. He [Falcon's manager George Burr] grabbed his checkbook and he said, make you a check for 500 records right now. They said, 500? They said, we never sold that many to anybody with big orchestra, how in the world could we sell 500 to just a two-piece band? Well, he said, make it. And that's why we, we made it, and it went over big." The record becomes a huge success and Michot relates how his grandfather and great aunt recalled hearing it constantly playing out of all the houses on the bayou and the pride it engendered in the Cajuns to have their music distributed across the US. Amédée Breaux's grandchildren are seated next to the Bayou; they explain that Amédée won an accordion contest by walking across the rafters of a barn playing "Allons à Lafayette". They describe the rowdy Cajun concerts where the pugnacious Breaux Brothers were separated from the audience by chicken wire in front of the stage, "I think the chicken wire was there for the Breaux Brothers not to get to the audience. Yeah, they were, they were something else" Jerry Mouton observes. They relate how Cléoma brought her brothers to record for Columbia Records in 1929 where they cut Amédée's "Ma Blonde Est Partie" a poignant lament to his lost love that is played accompanied by 1929 footage shot in Rayne, Louisiana where they lived. The song is a huge hit and its title is bowdlerized into "Jole Blon" and is covered by Harry Choates, Buddy Holly and Waylon Jennings, and Bruce Springsteen, ultimately becoming the Cajun national anthem. The grandchildren bring out Amédée's 1920s accordion on which he first recorded the song, Ophy's original fiddle, and Clifford's triangle. To celebrate their memory, Amédeé Breaux's grandsons, with Louis Michot, perform a cover of "Ma Blonde Est Partie" on the original instruments their grandparents recorded the song with way back in 1929. Mississippi John Hurt; A genial old African American man is seen playing "Spike Driver Blues" on the 1960s TV show. After the performance, the host Pete Seeger, introduces him as Mississippi John Hurt. He asks Hurt how he first learned to play at the beginning of the 20th century. Hurt responds "I had no teacher. I was just an eight-year-old boy. I'd go in and go to bed, but I wouldn't go to sleep. I'd get the guitar and I'd [plays softly]. I kept on at that `til I learned to play one number and I said Wow ... And when I learned to play that number, why, I didn't care who heard it then." In the tiny abandoned, overgrown hamlet of Avalon, Mississippi, the film arrives at a humble cabin in a woodland glade. There, Mary Francis Hurt recalls how this was once a thriving community, with footage of the abandoned collapsing shacks dissolving into photos of the same buildings, many decades earlier surrounded by townsfolk and her grandfather, Mississippi John Hurt. She describes her grandfather's benevolent "smile was like a pebble thrown in the lake and it would just spread". An old villager, Larry Carver recalls the joy that their tiny community felt when John Hurt first made records. Hurt's former manager Dick Spottswood reads a letter from Okeh Records recording engineer Bob Stephens, "Tommy Rockwell and I went on our field trip to Memphis where we already had some acts set up to record. Tommy told me he could take care of things and he suggested that I take a trip down the Mississippi Delta and see what I could find in the way of race stuff. So I suggested we organize an old-time fiddling contest. The winners would get an OKeh contract. While this was going on we kept hearing about some wild blues singer named Mississippi John Hurt. So we set out to find him. The trouble we had! Finally, we tracked him down late at night. We had to put the headlights on the door of his shack before we knocked. This guy came to the door, damn near turned white when he saw us. He thought we were a lynching party. We told him who we were and he asked us in. He threw a few logs on the fire. He took out his guitar and starts to sing. He was great! So we booked him into Memphis, he made a few sides for us". Hurt records "Frankie" a song based on the 1899 shooting of Albert Britt by his lover Frankie Baker after she caught him in bed with another woman. As "Frankie and Johnny," it became a popular standard, recorded by Jimmie Rodgers, Bob Dylan, Stevie Wonder, and Elvis Presley. The record company mails Hurt a copy of the record, but he has no record player. He goes to a neighbor's house to hear his record. 100-year-old Annie Cook recalls, "we had the old time Victrola that you cranked. And it was just unbelievable, just like when we got the first car how exciting something like that was then." Hurt gets a letter from Okeh to come to New York to make more recordings. There he records one of his most famous songs, "Candy Man", and, lonely in the big city, he writes a tribute to his hometown, "Avalon Blues"; "Got to New York this mornin', just about half-past-nine Hollerin' one mornin' in Avalon, couldn't hardly keep from cryin'". He returns to Avalon and writes to Okeh in the hopes of making more recordings but his letters go unanswered. The Great Depression has hit and for 35 years he ekes out a living sharecropping and minding cows, his recordings forgotten. Columbia Records archivist Michael Brooks explains that over the ensuing decades, the masters of Hurt's recordings, and 90% of the records made before World War II, are thrown out or melted down to make bombs for the war effort, wryly commenting "there might be a Mississippi John Hurt being dropped over Germany". In the 50s, record collectors began rediscovering these remarkable 20s recordings and trying to locate the mysterious performers that made them, particularly Mississippi John Hurt who inspires a nationwide manhunt. Spottswood recalls how in 1963 a collector found a copy of "Avalon Blues" and how he looked up Avalon in an Atlas and found it as "a speck on the road" in Mississippi. He asks a friend who is going on a road trip to stop by the town and see if he can't find anyone who remembers Hurt. When his colleague gets to Avalon, a resident points him to Hurt's cabin. Mary Hurt recalls that her grandfather no longer had a guitar and had no idea how famous he had become to a legion of folk and blues enthusiasts. Spottswood gets Hurt booked at the 1963 Newport Folk Festival, and the film shows his never-before-seen film footage of his performance of "Stagger Lee" in front of a rapt young audience. He says, "It's been quite a while since I did any of this, and I'm, I'm real happy to be with Y'all. You know, I can't help but be happy. Last I remember doing much of this, why I was with the OKeh Company, recording for them in '28 and '29. So, Spottswood discovered me down in Avalon, Mississippi. Why, I thought it was real funny, I said why, what have I did? Here's the FBI looking for me." Taj Mahal, who was at the festival, recalls the profound impact Hurt's music made on him, "when I first heard John Hurt's music it was like he was somebody I was looking for, it was like the, the musical grandfather you were looking for. He had another key to the musical universe". He demonstrates with a guitar how Hurt's music influenced his style. On a rare color film clip Hurt performs "Louis Collins" which Mahal explains, demonstrates how "the gentleness really came through with him." Returning to Avalon, Mary Hurt is walking through the forest near Hurt's cabin; she explains how Hurt, while hunting there in 1966, had a stroke. Crouched by his tombstone in the forest, she says, "I would say it was a tragedy, but he died the way he loved. And he's buried in this place. He's home. Daddy John's home." Annie Cook, with tears in her eyes, says "Well, you always heard that black was beautiful, and John was one beautiful man. He was kind and he was ... loved people and people loved him. I just wish we had more like him." As a reprise Hurt is seen performing "Spike Driver" at the 1964 Newport Folk Festival to rapturous applause. After the performance he is interviewed. He modestly explains why he is there, "Well, you know, I read it in the Bible, it says that the older men teach the younger ones. And I'm, I'm glad I've got something that they want." In the background Bob Dylan can be heard playing "Mr. Tambourine Man" on a nearby stage. Voyager 1 lifts off with the golden disc on board Blind Willie Johnson; A rocket is seen taking off from Cape Canaveral. NASA scientist Timothy Ferris explains that this rocket was Voyager 2, a 1977 space probe designed to study the outer planets of the Solar System. He explains that when it flies past Jupiter, the spacecraft is accelerated to a speed such that it will never return to the Solar System and will "drift among the stars of the Milky Way galaxy forever." He explains that he and his colleague, the astronomer Carl Sagan, came up with the idea of putting a gold phonograph record encoded with photos and sounds from Earth, attached to the inter-stellar spacecraft. He reveals that he chose the music to put on that phonograph and that this was a source of great debate: "The world contains many sorts of people, and there's no such thing as a best kind of music. It's not the Olympics; some composer doesn't win. Some of the most advanced music we have is Western classical music and there's some of that on Voyager – Bach and Beethoven, these are wonderful accomplishments. But as those composers themselves would have told you, Bach, for instance, at age sixteen was a fiddler at hoedowns. Beethoven was a student of folk music. Music comes up from the great mass of people. It comes up for everyone, the most common folks and has forever. There aren't any humans who don't participate in music in some way. I came across this remarkable Blind Willie Johnson field recording, made in Texas, 1927, called "Dark Was the Night, Cold Was the Ground". The melody is adapted from an old Scots hymn, goes back many centuries, and was transformed by Willie Johnson. In this recording he didn't include any lyrics, he just sang it as a moan over his guitar instrumental. It had a timeless quality to it." As the camera traverses the earth at night, Ferris explains "It's certainly a piece about the hardship and tragedy of life and the feeling of being alone and desperate and homeless. Night has yet to fall anywhere on the planet without touching men and women in exactly that situation. So one of my first priorities was, let's put this recording on this record intended to last for billions of years." As the craft is seen leaving the solar system on its endless journey into the universe, "Dark Was The Night, Cold Was The Ground" plays as the credits roll.

== Development ==
=== Inspiration ===
The grand purpose of the film is a love of America. As a small boy, I loved American films and movies. I grew up in suburban South London, and I remember looking up at the sky at the planes flying over from Heathrow and wondering if they were going to America and wanting to be on one of those planes.

— Bernard MacMahon

Director Bernard MacMahon said, "America has fascinated me since I was a child. My big love is American cinema, especially early American cinema, and I've always been fascinated by that period in the 20s when the technology and artistic language of the film were being invented." He commented that at the same time he became fascinated with the 20s music recording artists. He revealed the American Epic films were inspired by an advert in a magazine in 2006 for a blues festival in the Lake District, featuring Honeyboy Edwards, Homesick James, and Robert Lockwood Jr. - three men in their nineties who had grown up in the 20s at the height of the Delta blues era. According to MacMahon, "A voice inside me said, 'I need to take a camera crew and film there. Someday I'm going to need this.'"

"So we arranged to bring a [film] crew to the country inn where they were staying and filmed them talking about their youth and the music they had grown up with, including their memories of the formative genius of the Delta style, Charley Patton." MacMahon recalled, "It was an amazing experience listening to these men who had lived through all the changes from the nineteenth to the twenty-first century…watching them sitting together, trading stories and talking about the music and the Delta and how both had changed, and getting a sense of their outlook and the way they related to each other was a very profound experience." MacMahon said that when he screened the footage for his producer and screenwriting partner, Allison McGourty, she said, "This is great…We need to make this into something larger." MacMahon decided the films would "explore the vast range of ethnic, rural, and regional music recorded in the United States during the late 1920s." A story he considered would bring together music, social issues, freedom of speech and technology. He also viewed the story as fundamental in culturally, creatively and technologically shaping and influencing the modern world. MacMahon said this was the first time America heard itself. He posited that these 1920s recordings "allowed working people, from Native American farmers to a woman picking cotton in Mississippi, to have their thoughts and feelings distributed on records throughout the whole country. On the modern digital platform, we take that freedom of speech for granted. Back then, it was a revolutionary idea."

=== Research ===
MacMahon began extensively researching the period, concentrating on approximately 100 performers who had made recordings in the late 20s and early 30s at the field recording sessions. With very little information about the 1920s field recording sessions and the artists involved published in books, MacMahon elected to research almost exclusively in the field by tracking down eyewitnesses and direct family members to piece together the most accurate picture of the events at that time. One of the artists he was endeavoring to track down was Dick Justice. Suspecting that Justice was from West Virginia and a coal miner, MacMahon began running stories in the local newspapers from the 1920s coal mining communities in West Virginia that were still in print. After a number of failed attempts, he ran an advert in the Logan Banner that read, "British film company looking for relatives of Dick Justice." The advert resulted in a response from Bill Williamson who knew Justice's daughter, Ernestine Smith. Ernestine, who was in her late eighties at the time and still living in Logan, had a photograph of her father and dramatic stories of his life in the coal mines and his recording career. Bill Williamson revealed his father was the founder of another legendary group from the period, The Williamson Brothers. Inspired by what he'd discovered, MacMahon began to pursue other musicians of interest from the era. His production partner Allison McGourty encouraged him to use this research for the basis of a film. She reasoned that this would be the last opportunity to tell these stories before all the direct relatives and witnesses had died. MacMahon, on embarking on this vast research expedition, commented that "almost a century later, we wanted to see if we could still experience that music directly, among the people who made it, in the places it was played. We started by choosing some artists and recordings that we found particularly moving, then set out to trace them through space and time. At times it seemed a quixotic quest, but as we traveled, we kept being startled by the overlaps of old and new, the ways in which the music of the past continued to resonate and reflect the present. We had left our home in twenty-first-century Britain to travel across a foreign country and deep into the past, but over and over again, the people we met and the places we visited felt very familiar and very much in the present."

MacMahon and McGourty travelled extensively in 37 U.S. states for over 10 years researching the films. Some performers, like the Breaux Frères, had been misrepresented for years by erroneous photographs while others, like Elder J.E. Burch and the Hopi Indian Chanters, had no known photographs and no biographical information whatsoever. These had to be found by carefully studying census records and recording ledgers, and by placing adverts in local papers to help locate living family members. In the case of Burch, a solitary reference in a 1927 Victor Records recording ledger to Cheraw, South Carolina led the producers to travel to that town. When they arrived, they did not find anyone who remembered the preacher until they were introduced to Ted Bradley, a town elder who attended Burch's church as a boy in the 1930s. Bradley took them to Burch's church and revealed that Burch had been an emancipatory figure in the town, helping found the local chapter of the NAACP and unifying the black and white townsfolk at a time of extreme segregation. Bradley introduced them to another contemporary, Ernest Gillespie, who revealed that his cousin had lived next door to Burch's church and that Burch's music had inspired him to pursue a career in music. That cousin was Dizzy Gillespie, a major figure in the development of bebop and modern jazz and one of the greatest jazz trumpeters of all time. MacMahon researched other little-known musicians, like Joseph Kekuku, whom they confirmed to be the inventor of the Hawaiian steel guitar. They charted his journey from Oahu to the mainland and uncovered his touring itineraries which demonstrated how he had popularized that instrument throughout North America and Europe, resulting in it being incorporated into Delta blues, country, African Jùjú and even Pink Floyd. One of the biggest challenges was that the first electrical recording equipment from 1925 that made the field recording sessions possible had not been seen in almost 80 years. This equipment had huge scientific and cultural significance, as it was not only the origin of all modern electrical sound recording today, but also was used to record sound for the first talking pictures.

The production's sound engineer, Nicholas Bergh, spent ten years rebuilding the recording equipment from parts scavenged from around the world and the team located the first ever period images of the equipment from an archive of over 1,000,000 uncatalogued photos in the Western Electric archives. Most importantly, they located the rare film footage showing it in operation from a film collector in Belgium and a severely damaged reel in the British Film Institute. MacMahon summarized the research, stating the "process wasn't all sunshine and smiles—we traveled to beautiful places and met some of the most wonderful people we have ever known, but we also heard stories of poverty and discrimination, of hard times and troubled lives. The power of the music comes in a large part from its role as a comfort and release for people trapped in difficult situations. But the journey was always rewarding, not despite, but because of those connections. As we traveled, the songs became less and less connected to old discs and vanished eras, and more and more to living people and communities."

== Production ==
=== Interviewees ===
MacMahon resolved to interview only direct family members and first-hand witnesses for the documentary series. With the large amount of new and unpublished research in the films, he deemed it would be inappropriate to interview historians as they would be ineffective commenting on stories that were entirely based on new research. MacMahon also felt that the stories were the property of the family members, and it was their sole right to tell them. Some of the interviewees were close to 100 years old, and a number of them died shortly after filming. MacMahon used every available archival interview with the performers themselves, although filmed examples were extremely uncommon. Very rare archival audio interviews were used with key figures like Joe Falcon, Maybelle Carter, Will Shade, Ralph Peer and Frank Walker. These required extensive restoration work by the audio team to render them usable for the film. MacMahon remarked that the original ¼ inch tape of the Peer interview was "virtually unintelligible before Nick [Nicholas Bergh, sound engineer] got his hands on it, but it was vital for the audience to get a sense of this man's personality by any means possible."

=== Filming ===
Each story begins with one of those old record albums which would hold anywhere between four and eight pockets that you would put your 78s into. The idea was 'How, without being didactic, does one capture this beautiful richness, and at the same time, acknowledge that however deeply you go into these stories, they are just one of thousands. So we thought, 'why don't we pull one of these albums of the shelf?'

— Bernard MacMahon

All filming for the series was done on location with interviewees shot in places of significance to each story – on the porch of Maybelle Carter's house in Maces Spring, Virginia for the Carter Family story; in the building of the former Monarch Nightclub in Memphis, Tennessee for the Memphis Jug Band story; and on the shores of Oahu for the Joseph Kekuku story. The production involved extensive filming trips across 37 states that producer Allison McGourty coordinated "from Cleveland, Ohio to the Gulf of Mexico, and from New York to Hawaii." MacMahon determined a comprehensive anthology of the period was impossible within the time constraints of a documentary film series. Mindful of the vast number of musicians who participated in these recording sessions, MacMahon decided to focus on eleven stories in detail to give the viewer an emotional connection to the musicians and their music, and to their culture and geographical surroundings. He employed a creative device to demonstrate that the films were a selective exploration; each story began with a leather bound 78rpm record album, of the type used in the 20s, being opened to reveal sleeves containing the disc of the artist that would be the subject of the story, thereby indicating that this story was one of thousands in a vast library. This technique is known as an anthology film. MacMahon said he took his inspiration for this approach from "one of my favorite films – Dead of Night."

=== Cinematography ===
Extensive tracking shots were filmed of the landscape in each state and used as a device to demonstrate how much the geography influenced the music of the musicians in the 1920s. MacMahon explained, "As a filmmaker, I'm fascinated by how the eye informs the heart. Driving through these remote locations with the film crew, we would play the music from that area in the van and it was extraordinary how closely the melodies and rhythms reflected the terrain from which they sprung. I see music visually and I think it mirrors its environment perfectly. The music of the Hopi sounded otherworldly when I first heard it, but after traveling to the Hopi reservation and having the honor of being allowed to film there, I started humming their songs. 'Chant of the Eagle Dance' now sounds like a pop single to me." He added, "Things sound like the place they're from, the music makes sense. You're never going to hear Miles Davis make more sense than listening to him in a New York cab, and the Carter Family will never make more sense than if you listen to the music, watching the farm scenes from the 1920s from right where they lived." MacMahon coined the term "geographonics" for this phenomenon. MacMahon went to great lengths to find the locations of old historic photographs related to the stories and made frequent use of dissolves between these old photographs and contemporary footage he shot to show the passage of time. The interviews were all filmed using an Arri Alexa on a slider or a camera dolly. All the interviews and the occasional musical performances were storyboarded by MacMahon prior to filming. "We set out to explore why particular recordings gave us particular feelings and touched particular emotions and found that an important part of that was the way they reflected particular communities and the particular geography of the places where those people lived. The more we traveled, the more we became convinced that sounds and styles arise from specific environments, and you can only truly understand them when you go where they came from. Of course, you can enjoy music without hearing it in its native setting, but we kept finding that we had never fully experienced a recording or felt it to the depth of our souls until we listened to it in its home."

=== Editing ===
Dan Gitlin, the senior editor on the films, developed a pacing for the series in collaboration with director Bernard MacMahon to complement the leisurely speaking pace of the elderly interviewees. MacMahon said when Robert Redford offered to narrate the film he knew it would match the editorial style. He described Redford's voice as "untainted but also very American" adding that "he has a very low-key, understated way of speaking that suits this film. His voice has no baggage but it has enormous gravitas; it sounds like Mount Rushmore." MacMahon decided to showcase most of the archival music performances in their entirety. He said, "This technique was employed to allow the viewer to emotionally connect with unfamiliar music smoothly." Intense research went into ensuring all the archival film clips and stills were from the correct location and time period of each story. This technique was used to match the music with the landscapes that had inspired it. All the archival film footage and stills were scanned at the highest possible resolution, and extensive restoration work was undertaken on hundreds of rare and damaged photographic stills. Producer Allison McGourty explained that "it was really to do justice to the people themselves and the families, because for example when we found photos of Mississippi John Hurt or [the Tejano musician] Lydia Mendoza you want the public now to see them as they were then, which was beautiful. You don't want to see them in a raggedy old photograph, so we wanted to do justice to them and once you start doing [restoring] one, you have to do all of them." MacMahon was dissatisfied with the contemporary methods of presenting archival film footage in documentaries and innovated a new technique to blend the 4:3 aspect ratio of the 1920s film footage with the 16:9 aspect ratio of his contemporary footage. Traditionally the 4:3 footage had been either panned and scanned to fill the 16:9 screen, losing the top and bottom of the image, or reproduced intact with pillarboxing, resulting in black bars on either side of the frame. To overcome this, MacMahon overscanned the nitrate film revealing the edges of the frame and created mattes out of scans of the black leader from the same film reel to create a 16:9 frame. This new technique, called "Epic Scans" gave a full-screen appearance to archival film clips without losing any of the images, allowing the viewer to experience these clips as they were originally intended but on a widescreen format without cropping or black bars.

=== Sound ===
New sound restoration techniques were developed for the films and utilized to restore the recordings featured in the series. The 78rpm disc transfers were made by sound engineer Nicholas Bergh, using reverse engineering techniques garnered from working with the first electrical recording system on The American Epic Sessions along with meticulous sound restoration undertaken by Peter Henderson and Joel Tefteller to reveal greater fidelity, presence, and clarity to these 1920s and 1930s recordings than had been heard before. Nicholas Bergh commented that the 1920s recordings "are special since they utilize the earliest and simplest type of electric recording equipment used for commercial studio work. As a result, they have an unrivaled immediacy to the sound." Some of the recordings were repressed from the original metal parts, which the production located while researching the films. Peter Henderson explained, "In some cases we were lucky enough to get some metal parts – that's the originals where they were cut to wax and the metal was put into the grooves and the discs were printed from those back in the '20s. Some of those still exist – Sony had some of them in their vaults" The same care was taken in transferring and restoring the audio pulled from archival film clips, again using techniques and proprietary equipment devised by sound engineer Nicholas Bergh, who specializes in the restoration of audio tracks for the major Hollywood studios. The films were mixed in mono to match the contemporary audio with the 1920s and 1930s recordings.

== Soundtracks and albums ==
The quality of the audio restoration of the recordings used in the film series inspired MacMahon, McGourty and Erikson to source the best surviving masters of over 169 songs from the period and reissue them on a series of nine compilations. One compilation, American Epic: The Soundtrack, selected musical highlights from the American Epic films and five other compilations collected the best performances by some of the musicians profiled in the films. There was a country and blues compilation and a five CD 100 song box-set, American Epic: The Collection, featuring one track by each of the hundred artists researched as potential subjects for the films.

== Book ==
A book documenting the 10 years of research and journeys across the United States to create the American Epic films was written by MacMahon, McGourty and Elijah Wald. American Epic: The First Time America Heard Itself was published on May 2, 2017, by Simon & Schuster.

== Reception ==
=== Release ===
The film was previewed as a work in progress at film festivals around the world throughout 2016, including a Special Event at Sundance hosted by Robert Redford, International Documentary Film Festival Amsterdam, Denver International Film Festival, Sydney Film Festival, and the British Film Institute. The film was completed in February 2017 and aired on PBS in the US and BBC Four in the UK in May and June 2017. An NTSC DVD and Blu-ray of the series was released in the US on June 13, 2017.

=== Critical reception ===
The films were released to widespread critical acclaim, with many publications praising the direction, cinematography, archive footage, research and the quality of the sound.

Mike Bradley wrote in The Observer, "Bernard MacMahon's landmark documentary series is one of the most interesting music programs ever broadcast. It's hard to believe so much fascinating material can fit into one film. A gorgeous history lesson and exceptional television." Randy Lewis in the Los Angeles Times described the films as "an extraordinary star-studded four-part music documentary exploring the birth of the recording industry and its impact on world culture" Catherine Gee in The Daily Telegraph wrote, "This landmark three-part documentary from British director Bernard MacMahon brings us an evocative account of the birth of recorded music and the USA's cultural revolution." Michael Watts in The Economist described the series as "an unmissable new trilogy of documentaries, [which] uncovers the origins of popular music. One of the strengths of the films is that they resurrect the forgotten and obscure. Hardly anyone remembers J.E. Burch, a preacher from South Carolina who, in 1927, recorded 11 tracks of 'sanctified' music with his church choir that presaged the rage for gospel. Fewer still know that he inspired another musical giant, Dizzy Gillespie, who was raised a block away from his church in the town of Cheraw."

Iain Shedden in The Australian reported that "one of the highlights (and audience prize winner) of last year's Sydney Film Festival was the American Epic series of documentaries by British filmmaker Bernard MacMahon and producers Allison McGourty and Duke Erikson. It's an exquisite representation of the primitive power of American roots music and its enduring charm - music that stirs the soul." Elizabeth Nelson in Men's Journal observed that "over the decades, many filmmakers have dealt with the rich and woolly topic of American roots music, but few have ever approached the ambition of the current three-part PBS documentary American Epic. An immersive and panoramic overview of American song in the 20th century, the film tramps an itinerant path throughout the roadhouses and juke joints of the rural South, the border towns of Texas and the Southwest, and eventually reaches as far as Hawaii. Abetted by the extraordinary vintage footage, much of it recently unearthed, American Epic offers fresh revelations regarding artists ranging from the iconic to the obscure, all the while stitching together the diverse quilt of regional and cultural influences into a coherent and stunning whole."

Alain Constant reviewing the French broadcast in Le Monde wrote, "this documentary retraces with archive and testimonials the wonderful epic poem of country music, gospel, rhythm, and blues. American Epic is an ambitious project led by film director and producer Bernard MacMahon. His mission to trace the history of the origins of American popular music. The final result of this work co-produced with Arte, BBC Arena, and the ZDF, is impressive, with exceptional film and sound archives, as well as unpublished testimonies spread over three and a half hours." Steve Appleford in Rolling Stone described the series as "The Lawrence of Arabia of music documentaries" adding that "the goal was not simply to retell the Wikipedia version of the story. MacMahon and producer Allison McGourty spent a decade seeking original sources in the field, going from family to family. They discovered artifacts and previously unknown photographs of such originators as Son House, the Memphis Jug Band, and West Virginia mine workers the Williamson Brothers and Dick Justice." Garth Cartwright in Songlines stated that "as a connoisseur of American music I'm constantly surprised by some of the musical treasure American Epic discovers and shares. Not least the Hopi Indian snake dance footage of a performance in front of the Capitol in Washington, DC in 1926, a stunning find."

Phil Harrison in The Guardian wrote that "from the jug-bands of Memphis to the woebegone country blues of the Appalachian Mountains, early 20th-century America was full of unique musical forms developing in isolation. This first episode of a three-part series deals with the 1920s, the first decade during which these disparate yet analogous styles took flight from their places of origin and reached the rest of the nation. It's a treasure trove of picaresque stories, evocative footage and strange and beautiful music." Jay Meehan in the Park Record, covering the launch at the Sundance Film Festival, wrote, "Thursday night's Sundance special event at the Eccles Center was one not to miss. One thing that came through quite clearly from the entire evening is how deeply everyone involved cares about this project." Ellie Porter in TVTimes awarded the show 5 stars, calling the series "an absolute treat." Brian McCollum in the Detroit Free Press noted that the films were "stocked with rare images and scrupulously restored audio," explaining how "American Epic solves mysteries, brings a lost musical era back to life." He praised it as "a documentary which pairs a scholarly eye for detail with a buoyant fan passion." Sarah Hughes in The Observer noted that Robert Redford's "languid tone is a perfect fit," and that "this three-part documentary is a deep dive into the music that built America. Along the way love is lost, younger generations step up to the mic and reputations fade, but, as this glorious film makes clear, the music is always there, still vibrant and vital despite the passing of the years."

Joe Boyd in The Guardian praised the series as "remarkable ... American Epic, tells the story of how this existential moment for the music industry coincided with the arrival of electrical recording. Victor and Okeh Records' response to the crisis laid the groundwork for popular music as we know it today. Filmmakers Bernard MacMahon and Allison McGourty have focused on key individuals and archetypal stories, bringing the characters and times to life with great sensitivity and thoroughness. Here, we see the birth of 'race records' and country music, two strands of the fast-expanding record industry that converged, in 1954, with Elvis and rock 'n' roll. The series shows us how the record industry introduced America to its true self, selling hundreds of thousands of records in cities as well as in the sticks, and creating a worldwide taste for the rural roots of urban music. While the first three parts of the series delve into history, making up for the absence of live footage with great interviews and a stunning assemblage of photographs, the fourth crowns the achievement with something different. Miss it at your peril." Jonathan Webster in Long Live Vinyl wrote, "An Anglo-American team of documentary filmmakers, led by producer Allison McGourty and director Bernard MacMahon, set out on an epic journey to explore the huge variety of folk, rural and rregional music recorded in the United States during the late 1920s, culminating in a magnificent BBC TV series called American Epic" adding "with wins and nominations already earned at various film festivals, including Calgary and Sydney, it's a safe bet American Epic is going to carve a niche in the pantheon of TV's great documentaries." Ben Sandmel in Know Louisiana pointed out that "instead of presenting a host of music experts as talking heads, American Epic takes a novel and commendably populist approach by interviewing descendants of the featured musicians, or people who actually knew them. The most effective use of this technique can be seen in a segment about Elder J. E. Burch, a deeply soulful gospel singer from Cheraw, South Carolina. In Cheraw, director Bernard McMahon interviewed an elderly man named Ted Bradley, who had been a member of Burch's congregation. The scene where Bradley sees a photo of Burch for the first time in seventy years is truly touching, and such moments stand among the series' greatest strengths."

Daniel Johnson in The Courier-Mail concurred, noting that "one of the most touching moments in the series occurs when MacMahon and his team meet with an elderly man named Ted Bradley in the small town of Cheraw, South Carolina. In his youth, Bradley had been a member of musician and preacher Elder Burch's congregation, and when the American Epic team produced an old photo of Burch, Bradley's emotion is palpable. Similar scenes are repeated throughout the series and for MacMahon, being able to go to the sources, the places where the artists featured came from and where they wrote their songs, and talk to their descendants, gave him an even greater appreciation for the music." David Brown in the Radio Times praised the series as "a deep loving look at the roots of American popular music" noting, "There are dozens of lip-smacking clips in this series about America's formative music." Ludovic Hunter-Tilney in the Financial Times wrote that "the project's scope is vast but its argument is simple" acknowledging how "exhaustive legwork and first-rate archive footage bolster the narrative. Relatives of long-dead musicians are tracked down while archivists bring to light the fieldwork of record label scouts and recording engineers. In a touching vignette, three bluesmen in their nineties reminisce about their great predecessor Charley Patton; each of the trios died soon after the interview was made." He concluded, "Appearing at a time when the nation's lack of unity is starkly visible, American Epic makes for a beautifully presented, richly enjoyable fairy tale" Matt Baylis in the Daily Express wrote, "In this sweeping, electrifying, Old Testament-style account of America's musical journey, it was fitting that the first chapter ended in Memphis, with a young man called Elvis Presley, whose sound merged the two kinds of lightning Peer had captured in his bottles. The rock of the mountains and the roll of the streets."

Robert Lloyd in the Los Angeles Times praised the series as a "useful reminder that there is more to life than the noise coming from our capitals and cable news. Music may not save the world, but it unites us anyway. It can still knock holes in our prejudices, making way for open hearts and willing spirits. I don't mind telling you I got a little emotional watching this series, and you might too." Robert Baird in Stereophile commented that "the films have a wise structure that uses a single tune by a single artist such as Tejano/conjunto legend Lydia Mendoza's 'Mal Hombre' as jumping-off point for a deep dive into that artist's life and career" and praised the sound commenting, "What's most interesting for audiophiles is the huge improvement in the quality of the sound coming from these 78 transfers, both in the film and especially in the 5-CD boxed set of the same name." He adds that "the resolution and level of detail on these CDs is audible and impressive." Blair Jackson in Acoustic Guitar stated, "Be sure to check out the brilliant three-part documentary series American Epic. The story is masterfully told by director Bernard MacMahon, who artfully combines amazing archival footage, still photographs, vintage recordings, old and new interviews. Rather than attempting some sort of comprehensive historical narrative littered with endless names and factoids (Robert Redford is the series' calm and thoughtful narrator), MacMahon has chosen to focus on a few representative musicians from different genres to tell the tale in a more personal way. It's an approach that really brings the history to life. I can't recommend this series highly enough. It's constantly entertaining and inspiring, often moving (such as the section on Hopi Indian music), and full of surprises."

The films have received a number of awards, including the Foxtel Audience Award at the 2016 Sydney Film Festival and the Discovery Award at the 2016 Calgary International Film Festival, and were nominated for a Primetime Emmy for Outstanding Music Direction. On April 23, 2018, the Focal International Awards nominated American Epic for Best Use of Footage in a History Feature, as well as Best Use of Footage in a Music Production.

=== Accolades ===
Award	Category	Recipients and nominees	Result	Ref.
Calgary International Film Festival	The Discovery Award	Bernard MacMahon	Won	
Hawaii International Film Festival	Best Documentary	American Epic: Out of the Many, the One	Nominated	
Primetime Emmy Award	Outstanding Music Direction	Bernard MacMahon, Duke Erikson, T Bone Burnett and Jack White	Nominated	
Sydney Film Festival	Foxtel Audience Award	American Epic	Won	
Tryon International Film Festival	Best Documentary	Bernard MacMahon	Won	
Tryon International Film Festival	Best Overall Picture	Bernard MacMahon	Won	
Focal International Awards	Best Use of Footage in a History Feature	American Epic	Nominated	
Focal International Awards	Best Use of Footage in a Music Production	American Epic	Nominated	
