= Blind Willie =

"Blind Willie" may refer to:

== People ==
- Blind Willie Dunn, a pseudonym of American Jazz guitarist, Eddie Lang (1902–1933)
- Blind Willie Johnson (1897–1945), a gospel blues singer and guitarist
- Blind Willie McTell (1898–1959), a Piedmont and ragtime blues singer and guitarist
- William Purvis (1752–1832), a Tyneside concert hall songwriter and performer
- Blind Willie Walker (1896–1933), an early American blues guitarist and singer

== Media ==
- Blind Willie McTell, a song by Bob Dylan, titled after the blues singer
- Blind Willie, a fictional blues singer in Shel Silverstein's theatrical sketch, Blind Willie and the Talking Dog
- Blind Willie, a novella by Stephen King from his book Hearts in Atlantis
