= The Tenneva Ramblers =

20th century band

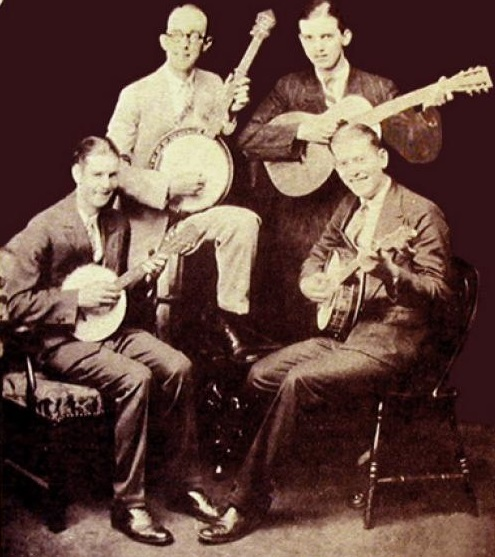
The Tenneva Ramblers with Jimmie Rodgers

The Tenneva Ramblers were an old-time string band which consisted of singer and guitar player Claude Grant (April 17, 1906 - October 1975), his mandolin-playing brother Jack Grant (July 25, 1903 - March 1968), and Jack Pierce (1908 - March 1950).

== Career ==
The Tenneva Ramblers were formed in 1924 by founding members Jack and Claude Grant and fiddle player Jack Pierce. The band was occasionally joined by banjo player Claude Slagle (1902 - March 1950) and the blackface comedian Smoky Davis. The group met and joined up with Jimmie Rodgers in 1927 and renamed to the Jimmie Rodgers Entertainers. The group performed together on the radio station WWNC in Asheville, North Carolina on which they debuted on May 30, 1927. The group accompanied Jimmie Rodgers to Bristol, Tennessee in August 1927. Jimmie Rodgers left the group after a dispute of the band's name on August 3, 1927.

The band recorded for Victor Talking Machine Company under their original name on August 4 in the recording sessions now known as the Bristol Sessions produced by Ralph Peer. They recorded three sides that day including their most known song "The Longest Train I Ever Saw". The group went on to record another session for Victor in February, 1928 and one final session under the name "The Grant Brothers and Their Music" for Columbia Records later in 1928. The brothers continued to play music throughout the 1930s. Jack Pierce left in the 1930s and joined a band known as the Oklahoma Cowboys with whom he played on radio and recorded for Bluebird and the American Record Corporation. After a brief reunion with Pierce in the late 1940s, the group appears to have stopped performing. The group's recordings have since been released in compilations such as their song "Darling, Where Have You Been So Long? in the American Epic: The Collection compact disc set.

== Discography ==
Title	Label Number	Recording Location	Recording Date	Notes
"The Longest Train I Ever Saw"	Victor 20861	Bristol, Tennessee	August 4, 1927	
"Sweet Heaven When I Die"	Victor 20861	Bristol, Tennessee	August 4, 1927	
"Miss 'Liza, Poor Gal"	Victor 21141	Bristol, Tennessee	August 4, 1927	
"Darling, Where Have You Been So Long?"	Victor 21645	Atlanta, Georgia	February 18, 1928	
"I'm Goin' To Georgia"	Victor 21645	Atlanta, Georgia	February 18, 1928	
"The Curtains Of Night"	Victor 21289	Atlanta, Georgia	February 18, 1928	
"The Lonely Grave"	Victor 21289	Atlanta, Georgia	February 18, 1928	
"If I Die A Railroad Man"	Victor 21406	Atlanta, Georgia	February 18, 1928	
"Seven Long Years In Prison"	Victor 21406	Atlanta, Georgia	February 18, 1928	
"When A Man Is Married"	Columbia 15322-D	Johnson City, Tennessee	October 15, 1928	Recorded as "The Grant Brothers and Their Music"
"Tell It To Me"	Columbia 15322-D	Johnson City, Tennessee	October 15, 1928	Recorded as "The Grant Brothers and Their Music"
"Goodbye, My Honey - I'm Gone"	Columbia 15460-D	Johnson City, Tennessee	October 15, 1928	Recorded as "The Grant Brothers and Their Music"
"Johnson Boy"	Columbia 15460-D	Johnson City, Tennessee	October 15, 1928	Recorded as "The Grant Brothers and Their Music"
