= John Dilleshaw =

American musician

John N. Dilleshaw (1896 near New Hope, Georgia – October 14, 1941), nicknamed Seven Foot Dilly, was an American Old-time musician and guitarist. Despite his nickname, he was 6 feet 7 inches (2.0 m) tall.

== Early life ==
Dilleshaw was born near the village of New Hope in Paulding County, Georgia. In his late teens, he suffered a self-inflicted gunshot wound to the foot in a hunting accident, and during his recovery he began to learn the guitar. He was taught by a local black musician named Bill Turner. Shortly after beginning lessons, Dilleshaw began playing with other musicians in the county. In 1918 he married Opal Kiker, and Kiker's brother Harry would soon learn fiddle in order to join his brother-in-law.

== Career ==
Around 1925 Dilleshaw was regularly heard with guitarist Charles S. Brook on the radio station WSB in Atlanta, Georgia. The city was the center of Georgia old-time music and also the contact point for various record labels who had installed their mobile recording studios there. These studios recorded musicians and artists of all genres, particularly rural musicians. Dilleshaw worked at the municipal fire department while on evenings and weekends and also played with the Dixie String Band.

In 1929 Dilleshaw founded his own band, which often performed under the name Seven Foot Dilly and his Dill Pickles or Seven Foot Dilly and the Hot Pickles. The group consisted of Dilleshaw's brother-in-law Harry Kiker on fiddle, bassist Pink Lindsey, and his son Shorty Lindsey on tenor banjo. In March 1929, Okeh Records sent a team to Atlanta to record local groups, including Dilleshaw. The recordings were published under the name John Dilleshaw and The String Marvel.

One of Dilleshaw's most famous recordings was his skit performance Square Dance Fight on Ball Top Mountain. Dance skits like this were popular throughout the latter part of the 1920s and into the early 1930s. He was also involved in the dance skit A Fiddler's Tryout in Georgia.

In November 1930, he made his last recordings for Vocalion Records.

He died of uremic poisoning in Atlanta in 1941 at age 44.
