= Rabbit Brown =

American singer

- Born: Richard Brown; November 28, 1885; Covington, Louisiana, U.S.
- Died: November 30, 1928 (aged 43) New Orleans, Louisiana, U.S.
- Genre: Country blues
- Occupation: Musician
- Instruments: Vocals; Guitar
- Label: Victor

Richard "Rabbit" Brown (November 28, 1885 – November 30, 1928) was an American blues guitarist and composer. His music has been characterized as a mixture of blues, pop songs, and original topical ballads. He recorded six sides for Victor Records on March 11, 1927, one of which, "James Alley", is included in the 1952 Anthology of American Folk Music and has been covered by Bob Dylan, among others.

The rock critic Greil Marcus has called Brown's recording of "James Alley" "the greatest recording ever made."

== Biography ==
Brown was born in 1885 in Covington, Louisiana. His family moved to New Orleans by the time he was three years old. He eventually moved to the Battlefield, a rough district of the city, where several events inspired some of the songs he later wrote. He mainly performed at nightclubs and on the street. It was noted that Brown sang "in a gritty voice and playing fluent guitar that incorporated flamenco runs, string snapping and high speed bass runs; he also took tourists for rowboat rides on Lake Ponchartrain".

Including the recording also selected for the Anthology of American Folk Music, five of Brown's six known recordings appear on the compilation album, The Greatest Songsters: Complete Works (1927–1929). His sixth recorded song, “Great Northern Blues,” was not released and is considered to be lost. At least four of Brown's most popular songs were topical ballads. "The Downfall of the Lion" and "Gyp the Blood" were based on events that occurred in New Orleans. Neither of these songs were recorded, but both were later remembered and named by Brown's contemporaries. Two of Brown's recorded songs, "The Mystery of the Dunbar's Child," and "The Sinking of the Titanic," are considered to be original topical songs, and not "folk" songs in the sense of being passed along from performer to performer with slight variations.

In October 2025, a University of Alabama student researching Brown for his senior project discovered Brown's death certificate. The certificate recorded that Brown died of an aortic aneurysm at Charity Hospital in New Orleans on November 30, 1928, nearly a decade earlier than previously believed. In August 2026, the same student identified the precise location of Brown's grave in Holt Cemetery by tracing his burial records.

== Blind Willie Harris ==
An anthology of rural acoustic gospel music, Goodbye, Babylon, released in 2003, included one of the two known recordings by an otherwise undocumented singer named Blind Willie Harris. This piece, "Where He Leads Me I Will Follow," was recorded in New Orleans in 1929, and in describing it, the authors of the CD liner notes pointed out its "strikingly similar" resemblance to Richard Brown's 1927 New Orleans recordings. Since then, more discussion has ensued among early blues and gospel collectors and scholars, leading many to state without equivocation that Harris was a pseudonym of Brown's, although no documents linking the name Harris with Brown have been found.

The most extensive biography yet, Richard "Rabbit" Brown: No One Knew What His Fate May Be was completed in late 2025 by Justin Sullivan, who devoted over 1500 hours to reconstructing Brown's life. Sullivan was able to prove Rabbit Brown was not Blind Willie Harris. Brown died months before the Blind Willie Harris recordings were made.

== Quotation ==
I done seen better days, but I'm putting up with these.

—Rabbit Brown

== See also ==
- List of blues musicians
- Music of Louisiana
