= Don Richardson (musician) =

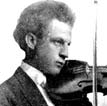

Background information
- Also known as: D. Amati Richardson
- Born: 1878; Clinton, North Carolina, U.S.
- Died: 1953 (aged 74/75)
- Genres: Country?
- Occupations: Fiddler; Professor

Don Richardson (1878–1953) was an American fiddler who may have made the first country music recording in 1914, eight years before the first generally recognised country recording was made in 1922.

== Discography ==
COLUMBIA

A-2018 Durang's Hornpipe (Mx 46759 April 1916) A-2018 Mississippi Sawyer (Mx 46754 April 1916)

A-2140 Old Zip Coon (Mx 46757) A-2140 Arkansas Traveler (Mx 46755)

A-2575 Devil's Dream (Mx 46756) A-2575 Miss McLeod Reel (Mx 46755)

A-3424 Dance With The Girl With A Hole in Her Stocking (Mx 79842) A-3424 Annie Laurie/White Cockade (Mx 79845)

A-3452 Soldier's Joy/Massa/Turkey in the Straw (May 1921-Mx 79844) A-3452 Little Yaller Gal/Old Black Joe (May 1921-Mx 79843)

A-3527 Hull's Victory/Quiltin' Party (Mx 79850) A-3527 Limber Up Reel/Old Oaken Bucket/Speed the Plough (Mx 79851)

A-3581 Opera Reel/Nellie Gray/Ivy Leaf (Mx 79852) A-3581 Rickett's Hornpipe/Pig Town Fling (Mx 79849)

S-5644 A Perfect Day/Dear Old Girl-Waltz (Dec. 1914-Mx 37125)

OKEH

1147 Dance With the Gal With A Hole in Her Stocking 1147 The Devil's Dream/Old Black Joe Medley

1169 Mississippi Sawyer-Medley (February 1919) 1169 McLeod's Reel (February 1919)

1254 Irish Washerwoman (July 1919) 1255 Arkansas Traveler (July 1919)

PHONOLA (Kitchener)

1147 Devil's Dream 1147 Dance With A Gal With A Hole In Her Stocking

SILVERTONE

46757 Old Zip Coon - Medley 46758 Arkansas Traveler 46759 Durang's Hornpipe - Medley

LITTLE WONDER (5" Records)

908 Durang's Hornpipe & Kentucky Home Violin solo 909 Mississippi Sawyer & Massa's In the Cold, Cold Ground, Violin solo (not aurally identified)
