= Weems String Band =

American folk music group

- Origin: Perry County, Tennessee
- Genres: Folk
- Years active: 1920s
- Label: Columbia
- Past members: Dickson "Dick" Weems; George Franklin "Frank" Weems; Jesse Weems; Alvin Conder

The Weems String Band were an old-time country string band who recorded in the 1920s.

The band was made up of the Weems family based in Perry County, Tennessee, including brothers Frank and Dick on fiddle, Jesse on cello and brother-in-law Alvin Conder on banjo and vocals augmented at times with two younger members, Atlas "Dodge" Conder, and Ray Hinson, who is Dick Weems step-son, on guitar and banjo. The only known photo of the band is as a sextet, although they recorded as a quartet without the younger members.

They recorded one single for Columbia Records in 1928. The songs were versions of the "Greenback Dollar" and "Davy". They had originally planned to record instrumentals but were told to go home and return to the studio the next day with lyrics.

Artist R. Crumb chose the Weems band as one of those for a series of trading cards in 1980 for Yazoo Records, later compiled in book form.
