= The Two Poor Boys =

The Two Poor Boys were an American, Tennessee based, folk-blues duo consisting of Joe Evans and Arthur McLain (or McClain) who recorded between 1927 and 1931. Their songs typically featured Evans' laid-back vocals, with a musical approach based on “beautifully matched guitar and mandolin accompaniment”. On some records they were listed under the pseudonyms, 'Colman and Harper'. Between the two of them, they played an array of instruments including guitar, kazoo, piano, mandolin and violin.

== Collected songs ==
The Two Poor Boys: Complete Works (1927–1931) – 1991. Document Records
No.	Title	Length
1.	"Little Son of a Gun (Look What You Done Done)" (recorded c. July 25, 1927 in Birmingham, Alabama)	2:50
2.	"Two White Horses in a Line"	2:51
3.	"John Henry Blues" (Take 1)	3:21
4.	"John Henry Blues" (Take 3)	2:44
5.	"New Huntsville Jail" (Take 1)	3:13
6.	"New Huntsville Jail" (Take 2)	2:54
7.	"Take a Look at That Baby"	3:14
8.	"Mill Man Blues"	2:37
9.	"Oh You Son of a Gun"	2:49
10.	"Georgia Rose"	3:00
11.	"Early Some Morning Blues"	2:38
12.	"Cream and Sugar Blues"	2:37
13.	"Old Hen Cackle"	2:42
14.	"Sitting on Top of the World"	3:04
15.	"My Baby Got a Yo-Yo"	3:01
16.	"So Sorry Dear"	2:47
17.	"Sourwood Mountain"	2:40
18.	"Down in Black Bottom" (Take 1)	2:40
19.	"Down in Black Bottom" (Take 2)	2:43
20.	"Shook It This Morning Blues"	3:01

Tracks 2–13 recorded May 20, 1931; tracks 14–20 recorded May 21, 1931, in New York City.
