= Blind Willie Walker =

American blues guitarist and singer

- Born: probably Willie Gowan; April 1896; O'Neal Township, South Carolina, U.S.
- Died: March 4, 1933 (aged 36) Greenville, South Carolina, U.S.
- Genres: Piedmont blues
- Occupation: Musician
- Instruments: Vocal; Guitar

Blind Willie Walker (April 1896 – March 4, 1933) was an early American blues guitarist and singer, who played the Piedmont blues style. He was described by blues musicians such as Reverend Gary Davis and Pink Anderson as an outstanding guitarist. Josh White called him the best guitarist he had ever heard, even better than Blind Blake: "Blake was quick, but Walker was like Art Tatum." In his performances, he was often accompanied by guitarist Sam Brooks.

== Biography ==
Walker was born in O'Neal Township, and was blind from birth. He spent most of his life in and around Greenville. He worked as an itinerant musician, and spent time with Gary Davis in 1911/13, apparently in a local string band that, according to one witness, comprised some six to eight persons ("pieces"), elsewhere (by Ian Zack, 2015) stated to comprise (in addition to the two guitarists) two lead violins, a bass violin and a mandolin. From 1923 he was led occasionally by Josh White, and later by Sam Brooks, who was Walker's cousin.

On 6 December 1930, Walker recorded for Columbia Records in Atlanta, Georgia. This session produced his only known titles, including "South Carolina Rag", later recorded by John Jackson. Walker played in an exceptionally facile style, and his "clear, minstrelsy vocals complemented his delicate yet strongly structured guitar lines." He specialized in playing in the key of C and was "obviously supreme in the rag idiom".

Blind Willie Walker died in Greenville in 1933, aged about 36, of congenital syphilis, which may have been the reason for his blindness. On his death certificate he was listed as being a professional musician.

The compositions "Make Believe Stunt" and "Cincinnati Flow Rag" ("Slow Drag"), made famous by Reverend Gary Davis, were attributed to Walker, who had taught Davis how to play the guitar, although according to Ian Zack, having first told his student Stefan Grossman that this was the case, on another occasion he disavowed it. Bruce Bastin, who travelled to Greenville in 1969/1970 to research the history of the local guitar tradition, writes that two younger guitarists resident there, Roosevelt "Baby" Brooks (nephew of Walker's accompanist Sam Brooks) and Baby Tate, were still performing Walker numbers as part of their repertoire, in particular a blues called "Honey, What's the Matter Now?" and a medicine-show style song, "Way Down Yonder in Dixieland", although even Baby Tate, described as "a fine guitarist" in his own right, hesitated to emulate Walker's tremendously dexterous guitar runs. Tate subsequently recorded a version of "Dupree Blues", using guitar lines and verses similar to Walker's, on his 1963 album See What You Done Done, while John Jackson included a version of "South Carolina Rag" on his 1979 album Step It Up And Go, although without Walker's signature rapid-fire guitar runs, one reviewer commenting that "the original by Willie Walker may be one of the most difficult guitar pieces ever recorded, and few musicians have dared to try it at all."

On the original of this song, Walker is playing in C-shapes but capoed up on the 5th fret (thus the song comes out in F). There can be no doubt that his fleet rapidly picked runs were executed using his thumb and index finger in rapid succession, as for example parallelled in the playing of Gary Davis (admittedly at not quite such a breakneck speed), although the speed and clarity of his playing was sufficient for at least one commentator to believe he was flatpicking (see liner notes to the 1968 Yazoo compilation East Coast Blues), a technique otherwise unknown in the blues at such a speed; in addition this would fail to account for his evident use of finger/s and thumb to play the remainder of the notes of the piece.

A recent rendition of "South Carolina Rag" arranged for two guitars, with some approximation to Walker's harmonic concepts/choice of chording and bravura playing, can be seen on YouTube by the contemporary performers Andy Cohen and Eric Noden.

== Discography ==
- "Dupree Blues" / "South Carolina Rag" (CO-14578-D)

Also recorded, but never issued, were the songs "Rider Blues" and "Da Da Da". A second take of "South Carolina Rag" has appeared on several compilation albums, including Ragtime Blues Guitar 1928-30 (1982, Matchbox Records).
