= Sol K. Bright Sr. =

American Hawaiian entertainer, musician (1909–1992)

- Also known as: Solomon Kekipi Bright Sr.
- Born: Solomon Kamaluhiakekipikealiʻikaʻapunikukealaokamahanahana Bright; November 9, 1909; Honolulu, Territory of Hawaii (now Hawai'i, United States)
- Died: April 27, 1992 (aged 82) Honolulu, O'ahu, Hawai'i, United States
- Occupations: Singer, songwriter, dancer, composer, musical producer
- Instruments: steel guitar, drums
- Formerly of: Sol Hoʻopiʻi's Novelty Trio, Sol K. Bright's Hollywaiians, Sol K. Bright and His Holly-Waiians

Solomon Kamaluhiakekipikealiʻikaʻapunikukealaokamahanahana Bright Sr. (9 November 1909 – 27 April 1992) was an American entertainer of Hawaiian and Castilian ancestry, who played steel guitar and is most widely known as the composer of Hawaiian Cowboy. He was awarded the 1987 Lifetime Achievement Award from the Hawai'i Academy of Recording Arts, and inducted into the Hawaiian Music Hall of Fame in 1995. He was also known as Solomon Kekipi Bright Sr..

== Early life and family ==
Solomon K. Bright was born the fifth of fourteen children to Hawaiian minister Andrew Laukea Bright, and church organist Alike Kekipau Bright in Honolulu. He was raised in a house at 910 Cooke Street in Honolulu. When he was a child, he gathered duck eggs in the swamps of Honolulu and sold them to stores to raise money to go to the movies. As a teenager, he won the city's Charleston dance contest — after coming in second during a prior try in which he was assaulted by the winning contestant. He also played the drums in the Hannah Bright Orchestra (Hannah being his slightly older sister).

== Career ==
His early touring years were as part of Sol Hoʻopiʻi's Novelty Trio, before forming Sol K. Bright's Hollywaiians. During this time, Bright also began producing musical shows. After his World War II stint in the U.S. Merchant Marines, he began appearing in films and on radio and television. In his later years he performed regularly in Hawaii before live audiences. In 1928, he was recruited by Sol Ho’opi’i (ho oh pee ee), perhaps the greatest Hawaiian musician of his time, who brought him to Hollywood. In addition to appearing in a few films, Bright later wrote and recorded songs with his own group, the Hollywaiians. He was known for performing on the steel guitar, although it was said that he could play just about any instrument. After World War II, he produced and directed Hawaiian-themed live shows in Los Angeles and elsewhere before returning to the Islands in his final years.

In a 2014 broadcast on his radio program “Territorial Airwaves,” — the audio archives of which are available online — disc jockey Harry B. Soria, Jr., recalled old “Uncle Sol” coming down to the station in the early 1980s, drinking scotch in the studio, and taking him carousing. Many hours later, Soria came to his senses to find Bright still going strong, riding a broomstick in a club while performing “Hawaiian Cowboy.” Today, Bright is best remembered for that song — a novelty tune, but one that reflects a proud tradition.

Hawaiian cowboys, known as paniolos, have been a part of island life since 1793, when King Kamehameha I received a gift of cattle from George Vancouver (after whom, they've named a city in Canada). Among the most famous of them was Bright's cousin, Ikue Purdy, who stunned the rodeo world by winning a competition in Cheyenne, Wyoming in 1908 after roping and tying a steer in 56 seconds. Although Purdy went back to work on a ranch and died in 1945, his memory has not faded: he was inducted into the National Rodeo Hall of Fame in 1999; and a bronze statue of him was erected in Waimea, Hawaii in 2003.

Bright talked about Purdy one evening while performing in San Francisco in 1932. He then noticed that a woman in the audience was leaving $20 tips on the table every time someone played a cowboy song. Given that incentive, Bright, with some help from another band member, composed “Hawaiian Cowboy” on the spot. The song, which is primarily in Hawaiian, describes a “horsewoman” whose “ride is smooth like the bonefish” as she crouches and works the knees, and who does not want her beloved cowboy mounting a “California steed.” Soria has noted that the song contains kaona, a Hawaiian word that refers to a hidden meaning. Sometimes kaona are political, but in this case, Soria equated them with double entendre.

He died on April 27, 1992, at Queen's Hospital in Honolulu.

== Compositions ==
- "Hawaiian Cowboy"
- "Duke Kahanamoku" (1935 tribute song)

== Discography ==
1929, as part of Sol Hoʻopiʻi's Novelty Trio, Columbia label

- "Ka Ua Loku"
- "Na Molokama"
- "Kilohana"

1934 Sol K. Bright's Hollywaiians, the Victor label:

- "Akaka Falls"
- "Beauty"
- "Goodbye Hawaii, I Love You"
- "Heat wave"
- "Hanohano Hanalei"
- "Haole Hula"
- "Honolulu How Do You Do"
- "Hooheno Kela No Beauty"
- "Hui e"
- "It's Just An Old Hawaiian Custom"
- "I've Found a Little Grass Skirt (For My Little Grass Shack)"
- "Kaia Ono"
- "Kalakaua"
- "Kalua Lullaby"
- "Kamaaina" (also as composer)
- "La Rosita"
- "Lei-e"
- "Malihini Mele (I Played a Tune on My Sweet Okolehao)"
- "Papio, Little Bamboo Bungalow"
- "Saint Louis Blues"
- "Soft Green Seas"
- "Tomi Tomi"
- "You're the Only One"

May 24, 1937, Sol K. Bright and His Holly-Waiians, Brunswick Records

- "Sophisticated Hula" (also composer)
- "What Hawaii Means To Me"
