= Charlie Burse =

American musician (1901–1965)

Charlie Burse (August 25, 1901 – December 20, 1965) was an American blues musician, best known for his work with the Memphis Jug Band. His nicknames included "Laughing Charlie," "Uke Kid Burse" and "The Ukulele Kid." The "uke" in his nicknames referred to the first instrument he was known for, the tenor banjo, which was commonly called a "ukulele-banjo" in the South. Later photographs show him with a tenor guitar, a similar instrument that he played in the same tuning.

== Biography ==
=== Career ===
Burse was raised in Sheffield, Alabama by his father—a hotel cook—and mother, along with seven siblings. During the 1920s, he moved to Jackson, where he met his wife, Birdie Crawford, and had three children. He then moved his family to Memphis, Tennessee in 1928. Burse played many musical instruments, including the piano, saxophone and spoons, but was only recorded on guitar, tenor guitar and mandolin.

As a singer and multi-instrumentalist, Burse recorded over 60 commercial sides with Will Shade's Memphis Jug Band. Burse was described as a "smart mouth" and Roger Brown remarked that he was "boisterous" and "the most irrepressible person I've ever met." This contrasted with Shade, who was businesslike and orderly in managing the band. Yet Burse became Shade's most frequent collaborator and a key member of the jug band in subsequent years. Shade and Burse were recorded by blues researchers Samuel Charters in 1956 and Alan Lomax in 1959, and appeared on a Memphis TV special called "Blues Street" in 1958. In 1963, the pair made one of their last recordings, Beale Street Mess-Around. They continued to perform together on street corners or private parties until Burse's death. Their renown revived toward the end of their lives, beginning with their rediscovery by Charters.

Burse participated in other projects, being photographed with an outfit called the Schlitz Jug Band (named for their sponsor, a beer brewer) in the early 1930s, and recording as Charlie Burse and His Memphis Mudcats in 1939. The Memphis Mudcats updated the traditional jug band lineup, adding drums instead of washboard, bass instead of jug, and saxophone instead of harmonica. He achieved an even more modern, piano-driven sound in 1950 with "Shorty the Barber," one of the first tracks recorded by Sam Phillips at Sun Studios.

Memphis nightclub owner Robert Henry credited Burse for inspiring Elvis Presley's signature "leg shake": "He would watch the coloured singers, understand me, and then he got to doing it the same way as them," Henry said. "He got that shaking, that wiggle, from Charlie Burse, Ukulele Ike we called him, right there at the Gray Mule on Beale."

Burse's brother, Robert, performed and recorded on washboard with the Memphis Jug Band and performed on washtub bass with the Will Batts Novelty Band. His sister, Fannie Carter, worked as a burlesque dancer, and her son Robert Carter played guitar with the Memphis Jug Band from at least 1940 on, adding electric guitar on their 1959 session with Alan Lomax.

Burse died of heart disease on December 20, 1965, and was buried in Rose Hill Cemetery in Memphis, Tennessee. He was survived by his wife Birdie, children Charlie Jr., Lucille and Connie, and seven grandchildren. On May 8, 2019, Mount Zion Memorial Fund unveiled a new headstone for Burse in a ceremony.
