= Big Chief Henry's Indian String Band =

- Origin: Oklahoma, USA
- Genres: String band
- Years active: 1920s-1930s
- Labels: RCA Victor
- Past members: Henry Hall (1877-1941); Harold Hall (1901-1986); Clarence Hall (1908-1975)

Big Chief Henry's Indian String Band was a Choctaw Indian string band from Oklahoma, United States. The band was composed of members of the Hall family—Henry, father, on vocals and fiddle; and sons Clarence on guitar and Harold on banjo. They played from Wichita, Kansas.

H. C. Speir, a music promoter from Jackson, Mississippi, heard them playing at the Choctaw Indian Fair in Philadelphia, Mississippi. He got them a recording contract with RCA Victor, who recorded a number of songs in Dallas, October 14, 1929.

== Discography ==
Original recording date October 14, 1929, Dallas.

Session	Title	Recording
BVE 56382-2	Blue Bird Waltz	V-40225
BVE 56383-2	Choctaw Waltz	V-40225
BVE 56384-2	Indian Tom-Tom	V-40281
BVE 56385-2	The Indian's Dream	V-40281
BVE 56386-2	Cherokee Rag	V-40195
BVE 56387-2	On The Banks Of The Kaney	V-40195

== Bibliography ==
- Sisson, Richard; Christian K. Zacher; Andrew Robert Lee Cayton (eds.). The American Midwest: An Interpretive Encyclopedia. Indiana University Press, 2007. ISBN 0-253-34886-2
- Spottswood, Richard K. Ethnic Music on Records: A Discography of Ethnic Recordings Produced in the United States, 1893-1942 & etc. (Vol. 5). University of Illinois Press. 1990. ISBN 0-252-01723-4
- Wardlow, Gayle Dean. Chasin' That Devil Music: Searching for the Blues. Backbeat Books, 1998. ISBN 0-87930-552-5
