= The Williamson Brothers =

American male musicians

Arnold and Ervin Williamson (better known as The Williamson Brothers) were American folk musicians based in Logan County, West Virginia, United States, who were active in the 1920s and 1930s. Arnold played the fiddle while Ervin played the guitar and did vocals. The duo recorded several songs for Okeh Records in the late 1920s, and remained musically active in subsequent decades, although they rarely recorded. Their version of "Gonna Die With a Hammer in My Hand" (a song about John Henry the steel driver) has been reported as being the most popular version ever recorded. Musically, they were closely related to other folk musicians based in Logan County in the 1920s, such as Frank Hutchison and Dick Justice.
