= Cléoma Falcon =

American guitarist and vocalist

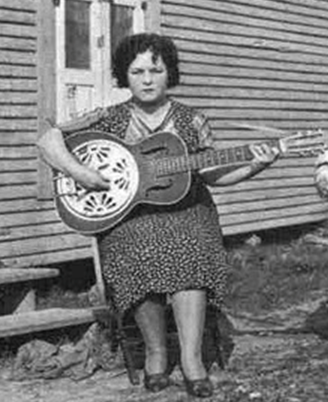
- Cléoma Falcon in 1934

Background information
- Birth name: Cléoma Breaux
- Born: May 27, 1906; Crowley, Louisiana, U.S
- Died: April 8, 1941 (aged 34); Crowley, Louisiana, U.S
- Genres: Cajun
- Occupation(s): Musician, guitarist, vocalist
- Instrument(s): Vocals, guitar
- Labels: Columbia, Decca
- Formerly of: Joe Falcon, The Falcon Trio
- Spouse: Joe Falcon (married 1932-1941)

Cléoma Falcon (née Breaux; May 27, 1906 – April 8, 1941) was an American guitarist and vocalist who, along with her husband Joe Falcon, recorded one of the first known examples of Cajun music. The recording, "Allons à Lafayette" was released in 1928, and opened the way for other commercial releases of Cajun music. Aside from being a ground-breaking recording artist, Cléoma Breaux also was one of the few women to perform live, despite the social standards of the era. She was the first woman inducted into the Cajun Music Hall of Fame.

== Biography ==
Cléoma Breaux was born on May 27, 1906, in Crowley, Louisiana, to an accomplished accordion player, Auguste Breaux, and his wife Mathilde Breaux. Cléoma Breaux and her brothers Amedée, Orphy, and Clifford Breaux were all taught as multi-instrumentalists, and began performing for the family's entertainment. Cléoma Breaux was capable of playing a "hard" rhythm guitar style, which was closely related to the preferred technique of later bluegrass guitarists. In addition, Breaux was trained to play the fiddle and accordion, though she never recorded with the two instruments. In 1917, Breaux's father abandoned the family, driving them into poverty, with the result that for the majority of their income, the family depended on performances at dance halls. In 1921, Breaux married to a local musician, Oliver Hall; however, it was a relatively short marriage and the two divorced within a year.

In the mid-1920s, Breaux was joined in performing by accordion player Joe Falcon. The two also began a relationship with each other and would later marry in 1931, while adopting a child named Loula. In 1928, politician and music enthusiast George Burrs hoped to capitalize on the group's popularity on the dance-hall circuit, and negotiated a deal with Columbia Records to record the trio which included vocalist Leon Meche. On April 27, 1928, the musical trio arrived at the recording company's satellite studio in New Orleans. Initially, record executives withdrew the offer because, as Falcon recalled, "They used to record with big orchestras. They looked at us and said that is not enough music to make a record". Nonetheless, Burrs convinced them otherwise and Breaux and Falcon, without Meche who was too nervous to perform, recorded a test of "Lafayette (Allons à Luafette)". The song was redone and released along with "The Waltz That Carried Me to My Grave". Not only did the recordings mark the first time Cajun music entered the music marketplace, but it was one of the few instances where a woman took part in the process.

Though Breaux was not credited on the recording, the novelty of a female musician in a male-dominated music scene enhanced the group's popularity on the dance-hall circuit. Breaux challenged social norms by retaining a feminine appearance and obstinate position the typically violent settings the venues brought. In August 1929, Breaux and Falcon were invited to Columbia Records' headquarters in New York City to record six sides, including the now-classic "The Old Drunkard and His Wife", a reworking of the folk song, "My Good Old Man". Falcon and Breaux shared vocals, but Breaux held solo singing duties on another side, "Marie Buller". In April 1929, Falcon, Breaux, and her two brothers, Amedée and Orphy Breaux, as accompanists recorded in Atlanta. In this session, Breaux was more prominent as a lead vocalist, on both Falcon's and her brothers' separate takes. However, with the effects of The Great Depression being a prime factor, the duo did not enter the recording studio for the next five years. Their next recording session was on August 8, 1934, for Decca Records. The duo began experimenting with blues and country music, and enjoyed a period where all they needed to depend on for funds were their music careers.

However, Breaux died aged 34 on April 7, 1941, after a long, unspecified illness.

== Awards ==
In 2002, Breaux was inducted into the Cajun Music Hall of Fame, the first woman to be so honored.

== Discography ==
Recording sessions:

- Joseph F. Falcon & Clemo Breaux (April 27, 1928)
- Cléoma Breaux With Joe Falcon & Orphy Breaux (April 18, 1929)
- Falcon Trio (February 20, 1936)

=== Compilations ===
- Cleoma B. Falcon – A Cajun Music Classic (LP-101 Jadfel Records, 1983)
- Cajun Vol. 1 - Abbeville Breakdown: 1929-1939 (CK 46220 Columbia Records, 1990)
- Cajun Dance Party: Fais Do-Do (CK 46784 Columbia Legacy, 1994)
- Cajun: Early Recordings (JSP7726 JSP, 2004)
- Cajun - Rare & Authentic (JSPCD77115 JSP, 2008)

(See below for external link to discography of songs.)

== Gallery ==
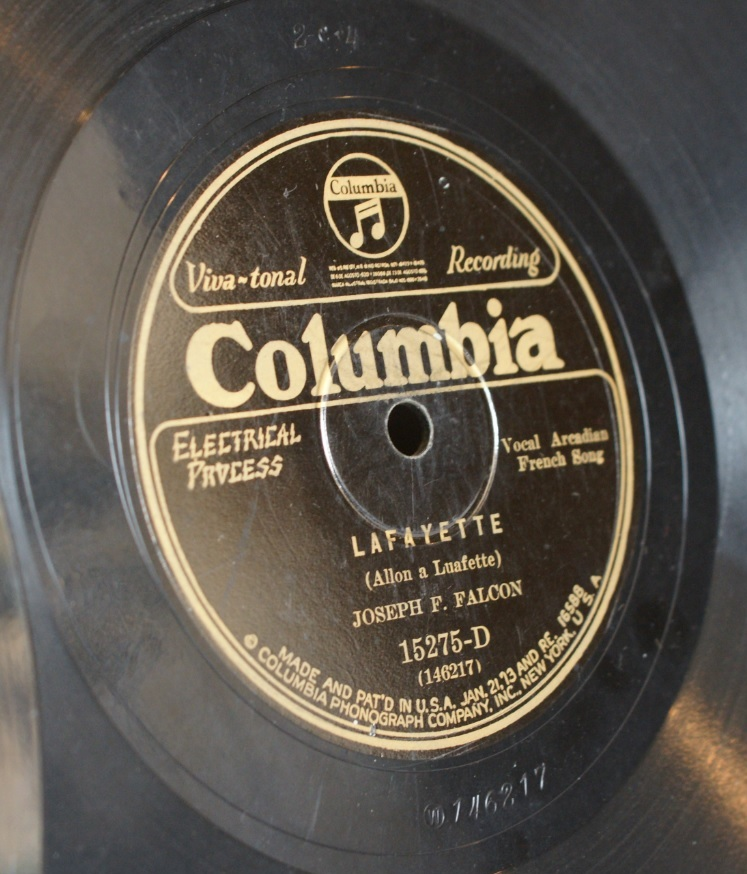
Columbia Records. "Lafayette (Allon a Luafette)"

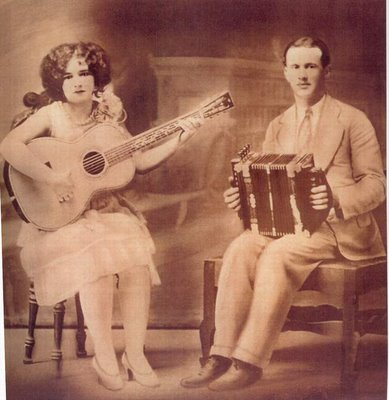
Joe and Cleoma after recording in New Orleans

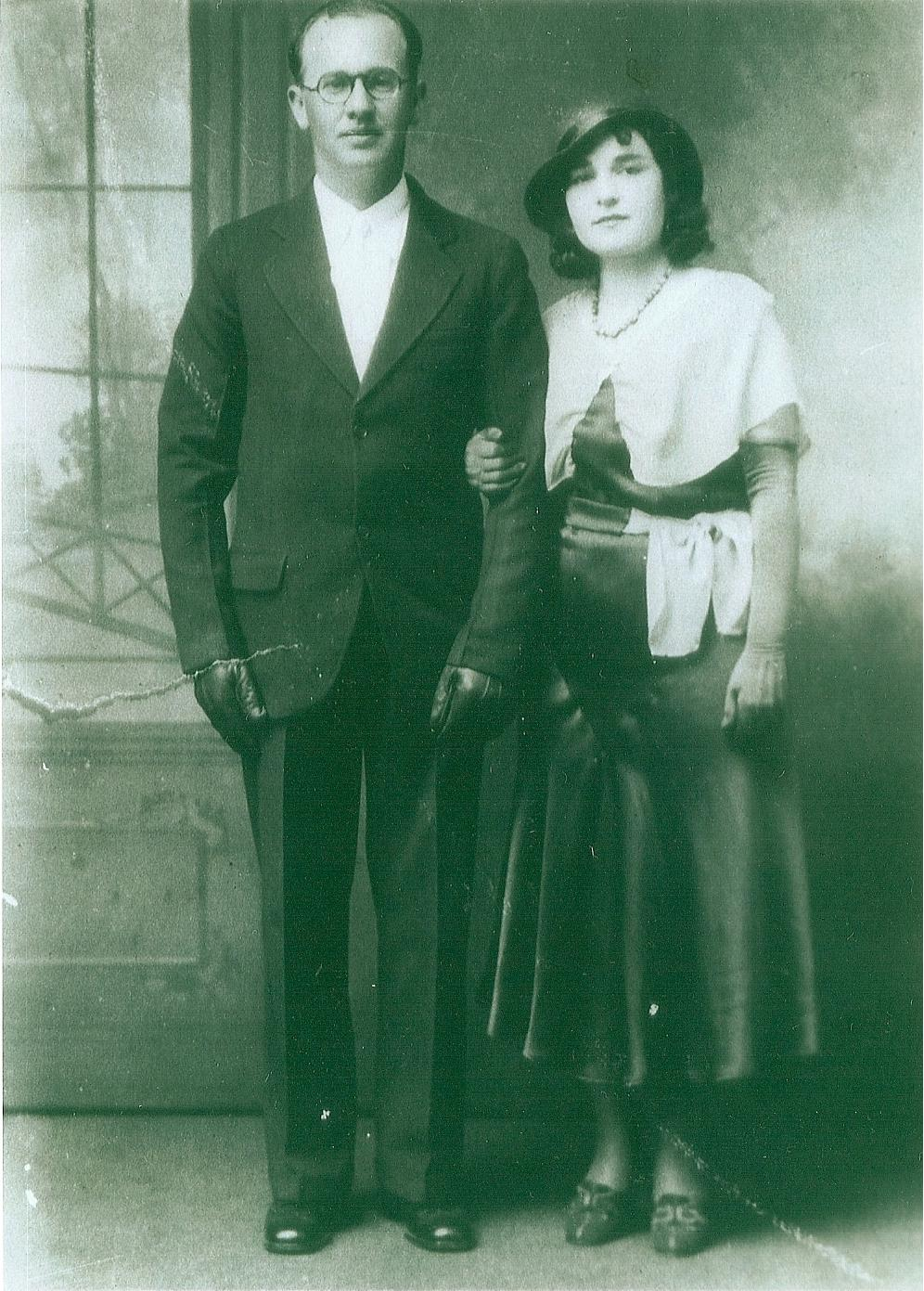
Joe Falcon and Cléoma Breaux on their wedding day April 27, 1932

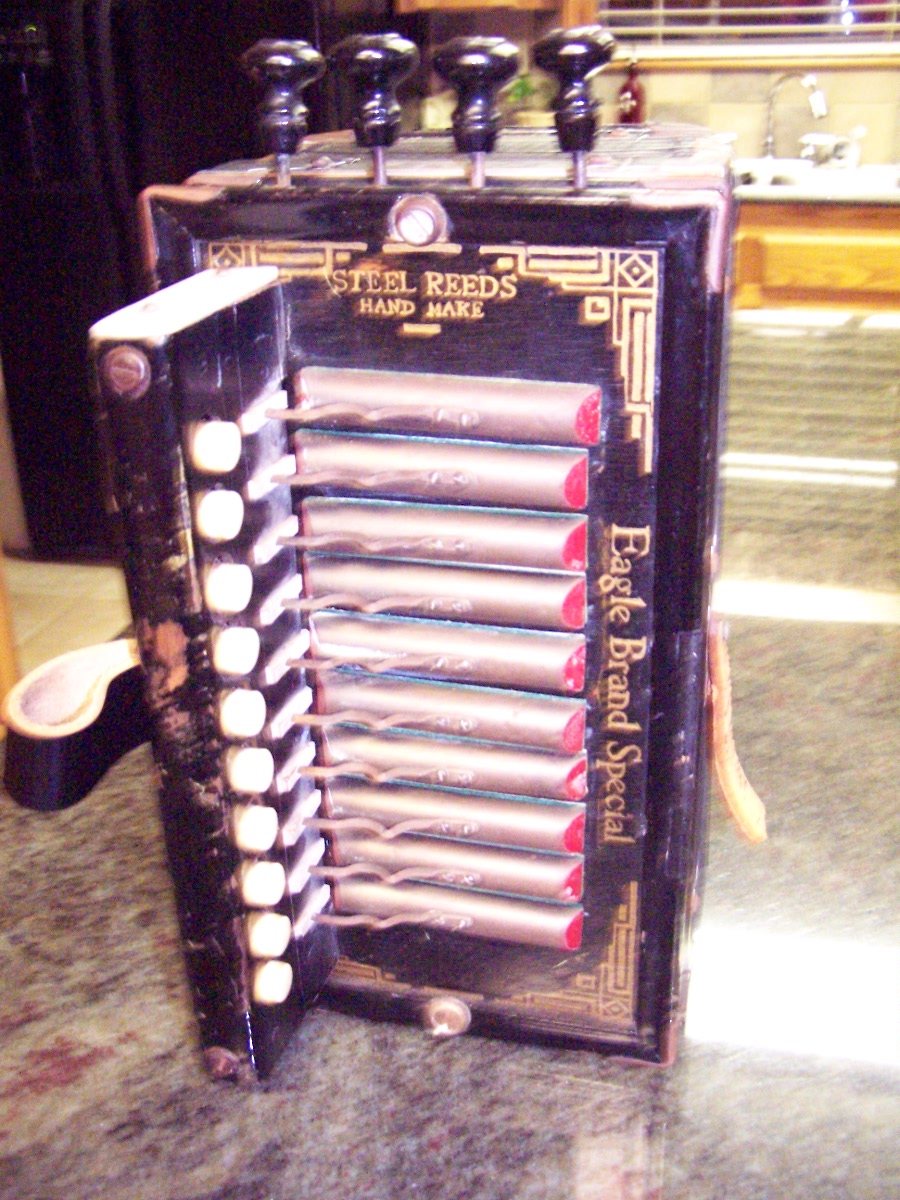
Joe Falcon's last accordion, a pre-WWII German "Eagle" brand.

== See also ==
- List of songs recorded by Cléoma Falcon
- List of people related to Cajun music
- History of Cajun music
