= Breaux Brothers =

American musical group

Breaux Frères
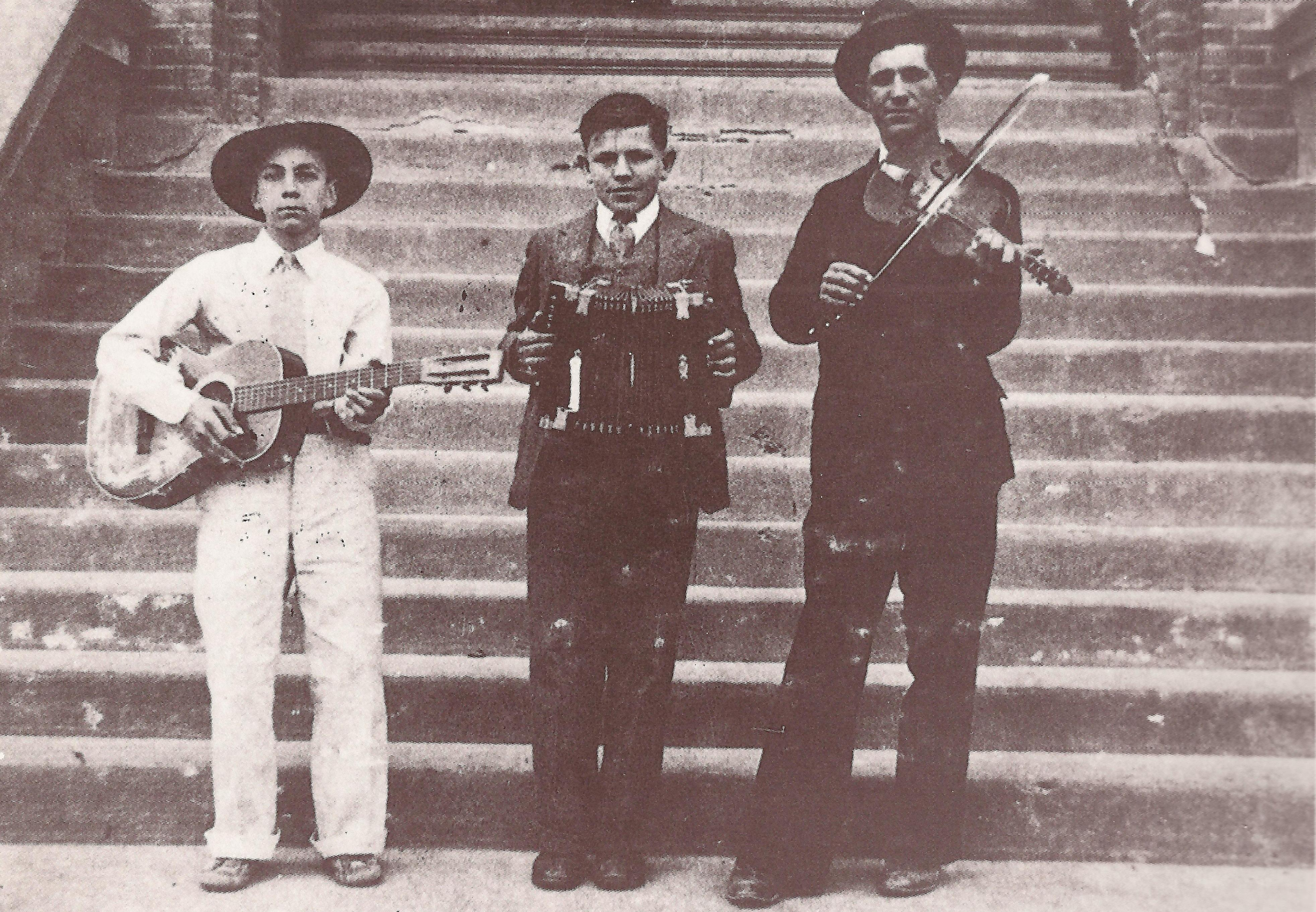
- Ophey Breaux, Amédé Breaux, Aldus "Popeye" Broussard

Background information
- Origin: USA
- Genres: Cajun
- Instruments: Vocals, fiddle, accordion, guitar
- Years active: 1931–1951
- Labels: Columbia, Okeh, Vocalion, Feature, Arhoolie, Crazy Cajun, Fais Do Do

Breaux Frères or Breaux Brothers (Amédé on accordion, Ophé on guitar, and Cléopha on the fiddle), were Cajun musicians. They were the earliest to record the song "Jolie Blonde", under the title of "Ma Blonde Est Partie".

Amédé Breaux was born on September 1, 1900, north of Rayne, Louisiana, near a community called Roberts Cove. He died in 1973. His father, Auguste Breaux, later moved to north of Egan, Louisiana, where he farmed. Amédé started playing the accordion when he was 12 years old and was playing house parties at the age of 14.

The whole family started playing music at a young age. His father, Auguste Breaux, was a well-known accordionist, and his mother played mouth harp. When his brothers, Ophey and Clifford, and his sister, Cléoma Breaux Falcon, were old enough they played music together. That was when he recorded "Vas y Carrément (Step It Fast)" and "Poor Hobo" in 1929 for Columbia Records. After he recorded "Ma Blonde Est Partie" (the earliest version of "Jole Blon" ever recorded) on April 18, 1929, he formed the Breaux Brothers band, consisting of Amédé, Ophey and Clifford. According to Cléoma's daughter, while Amédé is credited with writing the song, it was his sister Cléoma Breaux who actually wrote the lyrics while Amédé sung the song on the recording.

In October 1934, the trio recorded in San Antonio, Texas, for Vocalion Records releasing 16 songs. That same year, Alan Lomax recorded the brothers playing "Little Dog Blues". In December 1937, they traveled with Joe Falcon and Cléoma Breaux and recorded in Dallas, Texas, for Decca Records, usually working together or even recording solo. Much of this work would be versions of popular country or swing tunes and they would be listed in multiple combinations of their names, sometimes with or without all the members. During that session, Clifford would go on to record "Continuer De Sonner" which is an early version of the song "Keep A-Knockin' popularized in 1957 by Little Richard.

Amédé would eventually form a band in 1949 called The Acadian Aces. He made approximately 20 other recordings from 1930 through 1951. Some of these recordings included, "Hathaway Two Step", "Crowley Two Step," "Chere Mom," and "Criminal Waltz." He and his band played on a tour all over Louisiana and East Texas.

- Ma Blonde Est Partie Listen (MP3)

== Discography ==
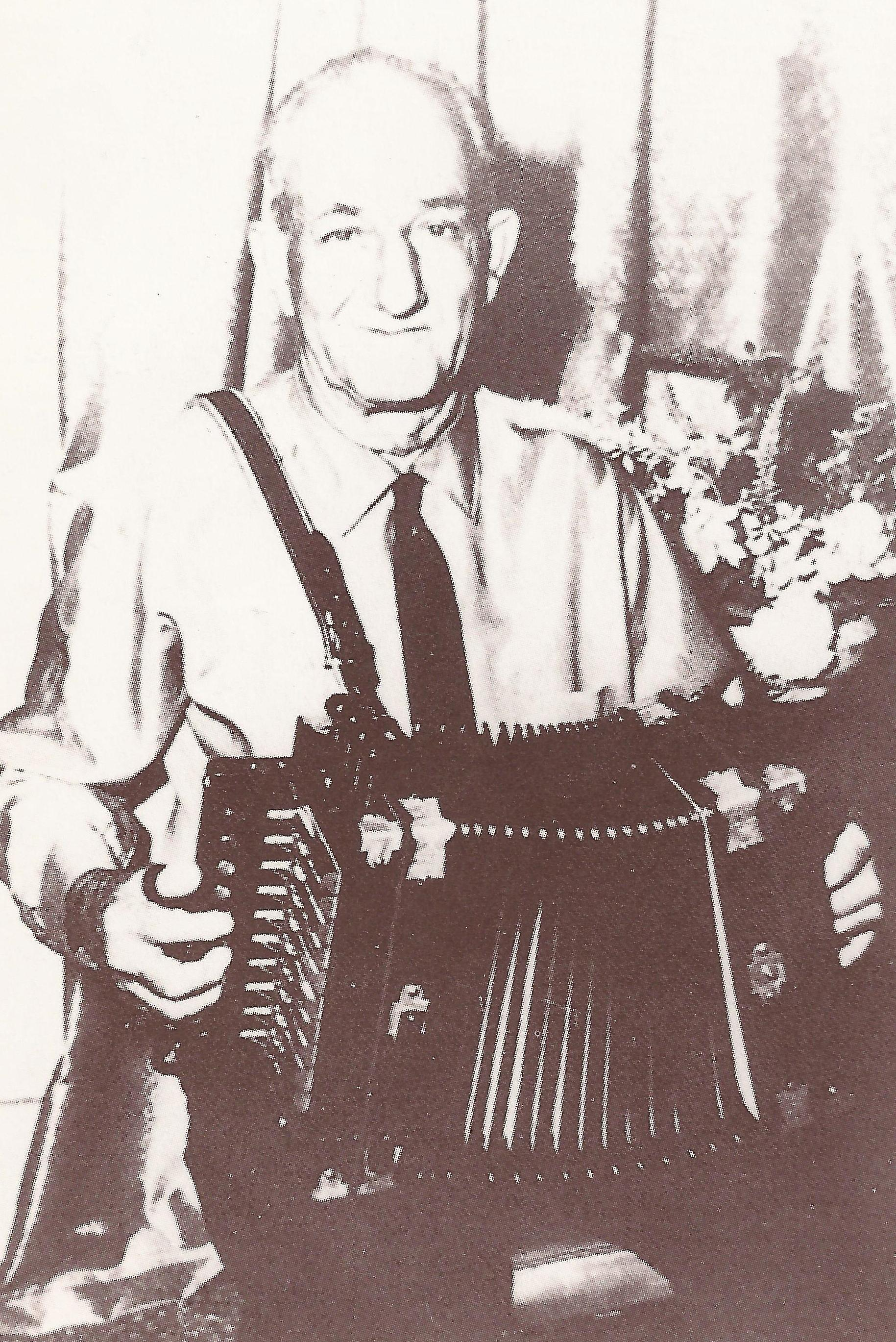
Amédé Breaux, 1967

Their work can be heard on the following discs:

- Cajun Fais Do Do (CD 416, Arhoolie Records)
- Cajun Champs (CD 327, Arhoolie Records)
- Cajun Dance Party: Fais Do-Do (CK 46784 Columbia Legacy, 1994)
- Cajun: Louisiane 1928-1939 (Frémaux & Associés FA 019, 1994)
- Cajun Vol. 1 - Abbeville Breakdown: 1929-1939 (CK 46220 Columbia Records, 1990)
- Cajun: Early Recordings (JSP7726 JSP, 2004)
- Cajun - Rare & Authentic (JSPCD77115 JSP, 2008)
- Anthology of American Folk Music (FP 252, Folkways Records, 1952, 1997)

== See also ==
- History of Cajun Music
- List of people related to Cajun music
