= Anthology of American Folk Music =

Compilation album by various artists
- Released: August 1952
- Recorded: 1926–1933
- Genres: Country; folk; blues; cajun; gospel
- Length: 252:30
- Label: Folkways
- Producer: Harry Smith

Anthology of American Folk Music chronology
Anthology of American Folk Music (1952)	Anthology of American Folk Music, Vol. 4 (2000)

Anthology of American Folk Music is a three-volume compilation album released in August 1952 by Folkways Records. It was compiled by American polymath Harry Smith from his own collection of 78 rpm records. It consists of eighty-four recordings of American folk, blues and country music made and issued from 1926 to 1933 by a variety of performers, divided into three categories: "ballads", "social music", and "songs".

The anthology sold relatively poorly, with no notable early coverage besides a minor mention in Sing Out! in 1958. However, it eventually became regarded as a landmark and influential release, particularly for the 1950s and 1960s American folk music revival. In 2003, Rolling Stone ranked it at number 276 on their list of The 500 Greatest Albums of All Time. In 2005, it was inducted into the National Recording Registry by the Library of Congress.

== Background ==
Harry Smith was a West Coast filmmaker, magickian and bohemian eccentric. As a teenager he started collecting old blues, jazz, country, Cajun, and gospel records and accumulated a large collection of 78s, those being the only medium at the time.

In 1947, he met with Moses Asch, with an interest in selling or licensing the collection to Asch's label, Folkways Records. Smith wrote that he selected recordings from between "1927, when electronic recording made possible accurate music reproduction, and 1932, when the Great Depression halted folk music sales." When the Anthology was released, neither Folkways nor Smith possessed the licensing rights to these recordings, some of which had initially been issued by record companies that were still in existence, including Columbia. The anthology thus technically qualifies as a high profile bootleg. Folkways would later obtain some licensing rights, although the Anthology would not be completely licensed until the 1997 Smithsonian reissue. Asch had a "reputation for releasing copyrighted songs without going through the proper legal channels."

== Sequencing ==
Smith divided the collection into three, two record volumes: Ballads, Social Music, and Songs. The first volume consists of ballads including many American versions of Child Ballads taken from the English folk tradition. Each song tells a story about a specific event or time, and Smith may have made some effort to organize them to suggest a historical narrative, a theory suggested by the fact that many of the first songs in this volume are old English folk ballads while the closing songs deal with the hardships of being a farmer in the 1920s.

The first record in the Social Music volume mostly consists of music that was likely performed at social gatherings and dances with many of the songs being instrumentals. The second record in the volume consists of religious and spiritual songs, including some Gospel songs.

The volume of Songs consists of regular songs, dealing with everyday life. Critic Greil Marcus describes them as being about "marriage, labor, dissipation, prison, and death."

Smith's booklet in the original release refers to three additionally planned volumes made up of music up until 1950. Although none were released during his lifetime, a fourth volume was released posthumously in 2000. Entitled Labor Songs, this volume centers around work songs and union songs. The album contains later material than the original three volumes, anthologizing material recorded as late as 1940.

== Design ==
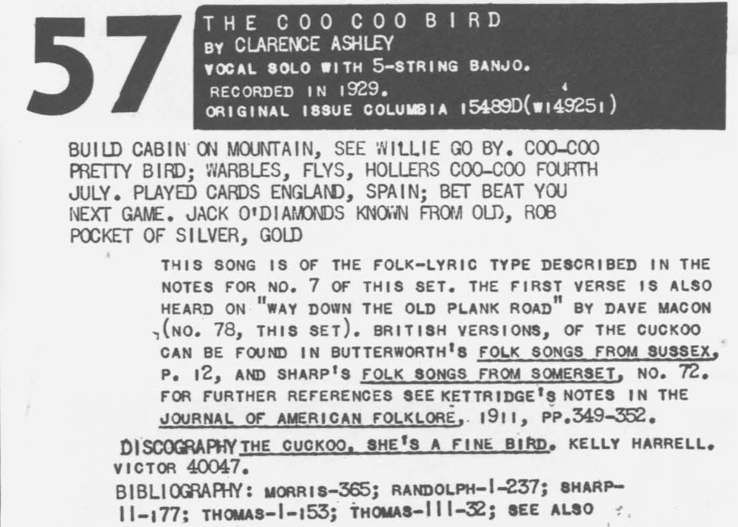
Example from Smith's Liner Notes: #57 – The Coo Coo Bird

Smith himself designed and edited the anthology and wrote the liner notes, which are almost as well known as the music, using an unusual fragmented, collage method that presaged some postmodern artwork. He also penned short synopses of the songs which read like newspaper headlines. For the song "King Kong Kitchie Kitchie Ki-Me-O" by Chubby Parker, a song about a mouse marrying a frog, Smith notes: "Zoologic Miscegeny Achieved in Mouse Frog Nuptials, Relatives Approve."

Each of the three sets carries the same cover art, a Theodore de Bry etching of an instrument Smith referred to as the Celestial Monochord, taken from a mystical treatise by scientist/alchemist Robert Fludd. The etching is printed over a different color background for each volume of the set: blue, red and green. Smith incorporated both the music and the art into his own unusual cosmology. He considered each of these colors as corresponding to an alchemical classical element: water, fire, and air, respectively. The fourth Labour volume (released later by Revenant) is colored yellow to represent the element earth.

== Release and reissues ==
Folkways originally released the Anthology as three double-LP boxed sets in August 1952. It sold relatively poorly initially. By 1953, Folkways had sold only fifty albums, forty-seven of which went to libraries and colleges and for a time, it was out of print because of copyright issues.

One of the first notable reissues was in the 1960s, released as three individual volumes like the original release. Irwin Silber replaced Smith's covers with a Ben Shahn photograph of a poor Depression-era farmer, over Smith's objections, although others considered this a wise commercial choice in the politically charged atmosphere of the times .

In 1997, Smithsonian Folkways Recordings, which bought Folkways Records in 1986, reissued the collection on six compact discs, each disc corresponding to an album in the original set including replicas of Smith's original artwork and liner notes. An additional booklet included expanded track information for each song by Jeff Place, excerpts from Invisible Republic by Greil Marcus, essays by Jon Pankake, Luis Kemnitzer, Moses Asch, and Neil Rosenberg, and tributes and appreciations by John Fahey, John Cohen, Elvis Costello, Peter Stampfel, Lucy Sante, Dave Van Ronk, Eric Von Schmidt, Chuck Pirtle, and Allen Ginsberg. The back cover to this booklet closes with a quote by Smith: "I'm glad to say that my dreams came true. I saw America changed through music." At the 40th Grammy Awards in 1998, the reissue won awards for Best Historical Album and Best Album Notes.

In 2006, Shout! Factory and the Harry Smith Archive released a tribute album titled The Harry Smith Project: The Anthology of American Folk Music Revisited, a two cd/ two dvd box set culled from a series of concerts staged by Hal Willner that took place in 1999 and 2001. The album features Beck, Nick Cave, Elvis Costello, Steve Earle, Beth Orton, Lou Reed, Sonic Youth, Richard Thompson, Wilco and others covering the songs of the original anthology.

In 2020, Dust-to-Digital released a compilation containing the B-sides of the records included on the Anthology entitled The Harry Smith B-Sides. Some songs were not included due to the racist or offensive nature of the lyrics, which drew criticism from reviewers.

== Reception and legacy ==
Professional ratings
Review scores
Source	Rating
AllMusic	5/5 stars
Entertainment Weekly	A
Pitchfork	10/10
Rolling Stone	5/5 stars
Spin	10/10
Uncut	5/5 stars
The Village Voice	A+

Writing for AllMusic, critic John Bush wrote the compilation "could well be the most influential document of the '50s folk revival. Many of the recordings that appeared on it had languished in obscurity for 20 years, and it proved a revelation to a new group of folkies, from Pete Seeger to John Fahey to Bob Dylan... Many of the most interesting selections on the Anthology, however, are taken from [obscure] artists... such as Clarence Ashley, Bascom Lamar Lunsford, and Buell Kazee." In his review for The Village Voice, music critic Robert Christgau wrote "Harry Smith's act of history... aces two very '90s concepts: the canon that accrues as rock gathers commentary, and the compilations that multiply as labels recycle catalogue. In its time, it wrested the idea of the folk from ideologues and ethnomusicologists by imagining a commercial music of everyday pleasure and alienation—which might as well have been conceived to merge with a rock and roll that didn't yet exist... Somebody you know is worth the 60 bucks it'll run you. So are you." Jon Pareles, writing in The New York Times, said that the songs "still sound marvelous and uncanny."

In 2003, Rolling Stone magazine ranked the album as number 276 on their list of the 500 greatest albums of all time, and number 278 in a 2012 revised list. It is the earliest released album on that list and also includes the oldest recordings dating back to Uncle Bunt Stephens' recording of "Sail Away Lady" in March 29, 1926. In 2005, the album was inducted into the National Recording Registry by the Library of Congress for being "culturally, aesthetically, or historically significant". In 2007, The Guardian listed the album as part of their 1000 Albums to Hear Before You Die. It was included in the 2008 book 1000 Recordings to Hear Before You Die, and the 2009 book 101 Albums That Changed Popular Music. In 2012, the album was inducted into the Grammy Hall of Fame.

Though relatively little was written about the Anthology during the first years after it was released (the first known press reference to the collection was in the folk music magazine Sing Out! in 1958, which focused on Clarence Ashley’s "The Coo Coo") musicians and writers tell of how much of an impact it had on them at the time. The music in the collection provided direct inspiration to much of the emerging folk music revival movement. The anthology made available music which was previously largely heard only in marginalized social and economic groups. Many people who first heard this music through the Anthology came from very different cultural and economic backgrounds than its original creators and listeners. Many previously obscure songs became standards at hootenannies and in folk clubs and coffee houses because they were in the Anthology. Some of the musicians represented in the Anthology had their musical careers revived. Some made additional recordings and live appearances. The collection brought the works of Blind Lemon Jefferson, Mississippi John Hurt, Dick Justice and many others to the attention of musicians such as The New Lost City Ramblers, Bob Dylan and Joan Baez. The Harry Smith Anthology, as some call it, was the folk music Bible during the late 1950s and 1960s Greenwich Village folk scene. As the liner notes to the 1997 reissue say, musician Dave van Ronk had earlier commented that "We all knew every word of every song on it, including the ones we hated."

The Anthology has had major historical influence. Smith's method of sequencing tracks along with his inventive liner notes called attention to the set. This reintroduction of nearly forgotten popular styles of rural American music to new listeners had impact on American ethnomusicology and was directly and indirectly influential on the American folk music revival.

Sing Out! published a full article on the entire set in 1969.

In surveying the critical writing on the Anthology, Rory Crutchfield writes, "[t]his is one of the strangest aspects of the critical heritage of the Anthology: its emergence from relative obscurity to prominence as a revivalist manifesto without much transition. In terms of academic credibility, this partly came from the work of [Robert] Cantwell and [Greil] Marcus, which was published fairly close to the reissue of the collection."

== Track listing ==
Volume One: Ballads (Green Singing)
No.	Title	Artist	Length
1.	"Henry Lee" (1932)	Dick Justice	3:26
2.	"Fatal Flower Garden" (1930)	Nelstone's Hawaiians	2:55
3.	"The House Carpenter" (1930)	Clarence Ashley	3:14
4.	"Drunkard's Special" (1929)	Coley Jones	3:16
5.	"Old Lady and the Devil" (1928)	Bill & Belle Reed	3:02
6.	"The Butcher's Boy" (1928)	Buell Kazee	3:02
7.	"The Wagoner's Lad" (1928)	Buell Kazee	3:02
8.	"King Kong Kitchie Kitchie Ki-Me-O" (1928)	Chubby Parker	3:08
9.	"Old Shoes and Leggins" (1929)	Uncle Eck Dunford	2:59
10.	"Willie Moore" (1927)	Dick Burnett and Leonard Rutherford	3:13
11.	"A Lazy Farmer Boy" (1930)	Buster Carter and Preston Young	2:57
12.	"Peg and Awl" (1929)	The Carolina Tar Heels	2:57
13.	"Ommie Wise" (1929)	G. B. Grayson	3:09
14.	"My Name Is John Johanna" (1927)	Kelly Harrell	3:12
15.	"Bandit Cole Younger" (1930)	Edward L. Crain	2:54
16.	"Charles Guiteau" (1927)	Kelly Harrell	3:03
17.	"John Hardy Was a Desperate Little Man" (1930)	The Carter Family	2:55
18.	"Gonna Die with My Hammer in My Hand" (1927)	Williamson Brothers and Curry	3:24
19.	"Stackalee" (1927)	Frank Hutchison	2:58
20.	"White House Blues" (1926)	Charlie Poole with the North Carolina Ramblers	3:31
21.	"Frankie" (1928)	Mississippi John Hurt	3:25
22.	"When That Great Ship Went Down" (1927)	William and Versey Smith	2:55
23.	"Engine 143" (1927)	The Carter Family	3:16
24.	"Kassie Jones" (1928)	Furry Lewis	6:13
25.	"Down on Penny's Farm" (1929)	The Bently Boys	2:47
26.	"Mississippi Boweavil Blues" (1929)	The Masked Marvel	3:07
27.	"Got the Farm Land Blues" (1932)	The Carolina Tar Heels	3:16

Volume Two: Social music (Red Singing)
No.	Title	Artist	Length
1.	"Sail Away Lady" (1926)	Uncle Bunt Stephens	2:56
2.	"The Wild Wagoner" (1928)	Jilson Setters	3:14
3.	"Wake Up Jacob" (1929)	Prince Albert Hunt's Texas Ramblers	2:52
4.	"La Danseuse" (1929)	Delma Lachney and Blind Uncle Gaspard	2:54
5.	"Georgia Stomp" (1929)	Andrew & Jim Baxter	2:44
6.	"Brilliancy Medley" (1930)	Eck Robertson and Family	2:59
7.	"Indian War Whoop" (1928)	Floyd Ming and his Pep-Steppers	3:10
8.	"Old Country Stomp" (1928)	Henry Thomas	2:52
9.	"Old Dog Blue" (1928)	Jim Jackson	3:01
10.	"Saut Crapaud" (1929)	Columbus Fruge	2:47
11.	"Acadian One Step" (1929)	Joseph Falcon	2:57
12.	"Home Sweet Home" (1933)	The Breaux Freres (Clifford, Ophy, & Amedee)	3:00
13.	"Newport Blues" (1929)	Cincinnati Jug Band	2:55
14.	"Moonshiner's Dance Part One" (1927)	Frank Cloutier and the Victoria Cafe Orchestra	2:39
15.	"Must Be Born Again" (1927)	Rev. J. M. Gates	1:28
16.	"Oh Death Where Is Thy Sting" (1927)	Rev. J. M. Gates	1:26
17.	"Rocky Road" (1928)	Alabama Sacred Harp Singers	2:42
18.	"Present Joys" (1928)	Alabama Sacred Harp Singers	2:50
19.	"This Song of Love" (1932)	Middle Georgia Singing Convention No. 1	2:56
20.	"Judgement" (1927)	Sister Mary Nelson	2:23
21.	"He Got Better Things for You" (1929)	Memphis Sanctified Singers	2:52
22.	"Since I Laid My Burden Down" (1929)	Elders McIntorsh and Edwards' Sanctified Singers	3:16
23.	"John the Baptist" (1928)	Moses Mason	3:02
24.	"Dry Bones" (1929)	Bascom Lamar Lunsford	2:58
25.	"John the Revelator" (1930)	Blind Willie Johnson	3:18
26.	"Little Moses" (1932)	The Carter Family	3:11
27.	"Shine on Me" (1930)	Ernest Phipps and His Holiness Singers	3:01
28.	"Fifty Miles of Elbow Room" (1931)	Rev. F.W. McGee	2:40
29.	"I'm in the Battle Field for My Lord" (1929)	Rev. D.C. Rice and His Sanctified Congregation	3:19

Volume Three: Songs (Blue Singing)
No.	Title	Artist	Length
1.	"The Coo Coo Bird" (1929)	Clarence Ashley	2:54
2.	"East Virginia" (1929)	Buell Kazee	2:58
3.	"Minglewood Blues" (1928)	Cannon's Jug Stompers	3:05
4.	"I Woke Up One Morning in May" (1929)	Didier Hebert	3:01
5.	"James Alley Blues" (1927)	Richard Rabbit Brown	3:05
6.	"Sugar Baby" (1928)	Dock Boggs	2:56
7.	"I Wish I Was a Mole in the Ground" (1928)	Bascom Lamar Lunsford	3:19
8.	"Mountaineer's Courtship" (1926)	Ernest Stoneman and Hattie Stoneman	2:42
9.	"The Spanish Merchant's Daughter" (1930)	The Stoneman Family	3:15
10.	"Bob Lee Junior Blues" (1927)	The Memphis Jug Band	3:08
11.	"Single Girl, Married Girl" (1927)	The Carter Family	2:44
12.	"Le vieux soûlard et sa femme" (1928)	Cleoma Breaux and Joseph Falcon	3:08
13.	"Rabbit Foot Blues" (1927)	Blind Lemon Jefferson	2:55
14.	"Expressman Blues" (1930)	Sleepy John Estes and Yank Rachell	3:01
15.	"Poor Boy Blues" (1929)	Ramblin' Thomas	2:22
16.	"Feather Bed" (1928)	Cannon's Jug Stompers	3:13
17.	"Country Blues" (1928)	Dock Boggs	2:56
18.	"99 Year Blues" (1927)	Julius Daniels	3:04
19.	"Prison Cell Blues" (1928)	Blind Lemon Jefferson	2:44
20.	"See That My Grave Is Kept Clean" (1928)	Blind Lemon Jefferson	2:52
21.	"C'est si triste sans lui" (1929)	Cleoma Breaux and Ophy Breaux w/ Joseph Falcon	2:59
22.	"Way Down the Old Plank Road" (1926)	Uncle Dave Macon	2:58
23.	"Buddy Won't You Roll Down the Line" (1930)	Uncle Dave Macon	3:15
24.	"Spike Driver Blues" (1928)	Mississippi John Hurt	3:14
25.	"K.C. Moan" (1929)	The Memphis Jug Band	2:31
26.	"Train on the Island" (1927)	J.P. Nestor	2:57
27.	"The Lone Star Trail" (1930)	Ken Maynard	3:12
28.	"Fishing Blues" (1928)	Henry Thomas	2:44

== Production personnel ==
- Moses Asch: Liner Notes, Transfers
- Peter Bartok: Transfers
- Joe Bussard: Transfers
- Philip Coady: Producer
- Pat Conte: Transfers
- Evelyn Esaki: Art Direction
- John Fahey: Liner Notes
- David Glasser: Mastering, Audio Restoration
- Amy Horowitz: Executive Producer, Reissue Producer
- Luis Kemnitzer: Liner Notes
- Kip Lornell: Liner Notes
- Michael Maloney: Producer, Production Coordination
- Greil Marcus: Liner Notes
- Mary Monseur: Producer, Production Coordination
- Steve Moreland: Producer
- Jon Pankake: Liner Notes
- Charlie Pilzer: Mastering, Audio Restoration, Transfers
- Chuck Pirtle: Liner Notes
- Jeff Place: Liner Notes, Reissue Producer, Transfers, Annotation
- Pete Reiniger: Mastering, Transfers, Compilation Producer
- Neil V. Rosenberg: Liner Notes
- Lucy Sante: Liner Notes
- Peter Seitel: Editing
- Harry Smith: Producer, Editorial
- Stephanie Smith: Research
- Peter Stampfel: Liner Notes
- Alan Stoker: Transfers
- Scott Stowell: Art Direction, Design
- Jack Towers: Transfers
- Eric Von Schmidt: Liner Notes

== Certifications ==
Certifications for Anthology of American Folk Music
Region	Certification	Certified units/sales
United States (RIAA)	Gold	500,000^{^}
^{^} Shipments figures based on certification alone.

== See also ==
- Folk music
- The Country Blues
- Harry Smith's Anthology of American Folk Music, Vol. 4
- Nuggets: Original Artyfacts from the First Psychedelic Era, 1965–1968-a 1972 compilation album of 60s garage rock compiled by Lenny Kaye
- Harry Everett Smith
