= Dick Justice =

American musician

- Born: Henry Franklin Justice; April 2, 1903; East Lynn, West Virginia, U.S.
- Died: September 12, 1962 (aged 59) Yolyn, West Virginia, U.S.
- Genres: Blues; Folk
- Occupations: Coal miner; Musician
- Instruments: Vocal; Guitar
- Years active: 1929
- Label: Brunswick Records

Henry Franklin "Dick" Justice (April 2, 1903 – September 12, 1962) was an American blues and folk musician, who hailed from West Virginia, United States.

== Biography ==
Born Henry Franklin Justice, he recorded ten songs for Brunswick Records in Chicago in 1929. Justice was heavily influenced by black musicians, particularly Luke Jordan, who recorded in 1927 and 1929 for Victor Records. Justice's "Cocaine" is a verse-for-verse cover of the Jordan track of the same name recorded two years earlier. The song "Brownskin Blues" is also stylistically akin to much of Jordan's work but stands on its own as a Justice original.

Justice is musically related to Frank Hutchison (with whom he played music and worked as a coal miner in Logan County, West Virginia), Bayless Rose and The Williamson Brothers.

His recording of the traditional ballad "Henry Lee" was the opening track of Harry Smith's Anthology of American Folk Music. Justice recorded four sides ("Guian Valley Waltz" and "Poor Girl's Waltz", "Muskrat Rag" and "Poca River Blues") with the fiddler Reese Jarvis.
