= List of gospel blues musicians =

The following is a list of gospel blues musicians.

- Danny Brooks
- Pearly Brown
- Edward W. Clayborn
- Reverend Gary Davis
- Thomas A. Dorsey
- Blind Roosevelt Graves
- Vera Hall
- Son House
- Bo Weavil Jackson
- Skip James
- Blind Lemon Jefferson
- Blind Willie Johnson
- Glenn Kaiser
- Booker T. Laury
- Bishop Dready Manning
- Darrell Mansfield
- Sister Gertrude Morgan
- Charlie Patton
- Washington Phillips
- D.C. Rice
- Boyd Rivers
- Eugene Smith
- Blind Joe Taggart
- Little Johnny Taylor
- Sister Rosetta Tharpe
- Bukka White
- Josh White
- Elder Roma Wilson
- Robert Wilkins
- Zora Young

== See also ==
- List of soul-blues musicians
