= James Gates =

James Gates may refer to:

- Sylvester James Gates (born 1950), or Jim Gates, American theoretical physicist
- James M. Gates Jr. (1935–2004), American military person
- Reverend J. M. Gates (1884–1945), American preacher
