= Bayless Rose =

- Born: May 4, 1890; Booneville, Kentucky, U.S.
- Died: April 27, 1986 (aged 95) Fayette County, Kentucky, U.S.
- Genre: Blues
- Occupation: Musician
- Instruments: Vocal; Guitar

Bayless Rose (May 4, 1890 – April 27, 1986) was an American singer and guitarist who recorded for Gennett Records in 1930. Although the music industry was highly segregated at the time, it is uncertain whether he was White or African American.

== Career ==
His four titles issued on the Gennett and Champion labels have been seen as stylistically similar to White blues artists such as Dick Justice and Frank Hutchison, and therefore reissued on anthologies of early White country music by County Records and Arhoolie. However, he was included in an anthology of Black Ragtime Blues Guitar and likened stylistically in the sleeve notes by Paul Oliver to Black blues musicians of the Northern Piedmont. Later reissues have been in collections which are neither exclusively Country nor exclusively Blues.

Rose is known to have accompanied 1930 Gennett recordings of the Black artists Clara Burston, Walter Coleman and (possibly) Cow Cow Davenport. For this reason he is included in the comprehensive pre-1943 Blues and Gospel discography, and excluded from the comprehensive pre-1943 Country Music discography. However, research published by Christopher King in Issue # 12 of the journal 78 Quarterly suggests otherwise. In an interview, Mildred Justice, the daughter of Dick Justice recalled that her father played with a railway worker called Bailey Rose who she described as "quite a bit older than daddy". He was "the man who sounded the most like daddy" and taught her father how to play "Old Black Dog" and "Brown Gal". She twice asserted that Rose was not Black, but did describe him as dark-skinned and Arab looking. King suggests that he may have been a Melungeon.

== Recordings ==
| Matrix | Title | Issue | Some re-issues | Notes |
|---|---|---|---|---|
| 16654-A | "Black Dog Blues" | unissued | | |
| 16655-A | "Salty Dog" | unissued | | |
| 16656- | "Frisco Blues" | unissued | | |
| 16732-- | "Jamestown Exhibition" | Champion 16772, 50011 | "Ragtime Blues Guitar" (Matchbox), "Ragtime Blues Guitar" (Document), "Old-Time Mountain Guitar" (County) | Ragtime guitar solo. Title refers to the 1907 Jamestown Tricentennial Exposition. |
| 16733-- | "Black Dog Blues" | Gennett 7250, Champion 16307 | "East Coast Blues" (Yazoo), "Ragtime Blues Guitar" (Matchbox), (Document) | Recorded by Dick Justice as "Old Black Dog". Variant of "Honey Where You Been So Long", popular among White singers |
| 16735-- | "Original Blues" | Gennett 7250, Champion 16307 | "East Coast Blues" (Yazoo), "Ragtime Blues Guitar" (Matchbox), (Document) | Similar to "Brown Skin Blues" by Dick Justice |
| 16737-A | "Beale Street Blues" | unissued | | |
| 16739-- | "Frisco Blues" | Champion 16772, 50011 | "Ragtime Blues Guitar" (Matchbox), "Ragtime Blues Guitar" (Document) | Guitar solo. Title may refer to the St. Louis – San Francisco Railway. |

Matrix 16734 was "Casey Jones Blues" (unissued) by Cow Cow Davenport with a guitarist who may have been Bayless Rose. Matrices 12736-A and 16738—were by Ivy Smith accompanied by Davenport but without a guitarist. Rose definitely accompanied Clara Burston on four songs and Walter Coleman on four songs.
