= Georgia Peach =

Georgia Peach or Georgia Peaches may refer to:

- Peaches grown in the U.S. state of Georgia
- Georgia Peach (album), an album by Burrito Deluxe
- GA Peach, a 2006 album by female rap artist Rasheeda
- "Georgia Peaches", a 2011 song recorded by Lauren Alaina
- The Georgia Peaches, a 1980 film
- American Major League Baseball outfielder Ty Cobb was nicknamed "The Georgia Peach"
- "The Georgia Peach", the name given by the Germans to Jane Anderson, an American broadcaster of Nazi propaganda during World War II
- American gospel singer Sister Clara Hudmon used the stage name "Georgia Peach"
- Peach County, Georgia
