= Reverend J. C. Burnett =

American preacher

Reverend J. C. Burnett was an American preacher who recorded gospel songs and sermons extensively in the late-1920s and intermittently thereafter until the 1940s. During his heyday, recording for Columbia Records, Burnett was one of the most commercially successful preachers on race records, alongside Reverend J. M. Gates and Reverend A. W. Nix. Years following Burnett's close of his recording career, his sermons still receive attention on compilation albums and from musical artists, particularly Bob Dylan.

== Biography ==
A native of Mobile, Alabama, Burnett joined the Baptist ministry in 1911, preaching "good old-fashioned sermons in a manner made famous by the Reverend J. M. Gates", as writer Lerone A. Martin noted in his book Preaching on Wax: The Phonograph and the Shaping of Modern African American Religion. The self-taught Reverend, who proudly proclaimed he "never spent a day at school", began achieving success preaching on the gospel tent circuit in Louisiana, Mississippi, and Texas. Burnett was first recorded by the small Kansas-based record label, Merit Records, which was managed by musician and music store owner Winston Holmes. With Holmes, the Reverend recorded his sermon, "The Downfall of Nebuchadnezzar", and, despite limited promotional capacities, a Columbia Records talent scout "discovered" Burnett in late-1926.

However, the Reverend's work with Columbia was briefly delayed as Holmes, who still had a recording contract with Burnett, filed a lawsuit against the label, which he consequently lost. Burnett re-recorded "The Downfall of Nebuchadnezzar", and the sermon sold unexpectedly well—approximately 80,000 copies in total—as listeners were interested in the Reverend's emotive interpretation of Daniel 4:14. Settled in New York City, Burnett, from 1926 to 1929, recorded 32 sermons (four unissued), becoming one of the more extensively represented preachers on record. Most of the Reverend's work saw him accompanied by vocalists Sister Ethel Granger and Odette Jackson, and organist Porter Grainger. Inspired mainly by the writings found in the Book of Revelation, the Reverend found additional success with sermons such as "The Great Day of His Wrath Has Come".

The Reverend took a nine-year hiatus from recording, but returned to New York City in 1938 to record eight sermons for Decca Records, including another version of "The Downfall of Nebuchadnezzar". Burnett's former organist, Grainger, recommended the Reverend to record producer Joe Davis in 1945, leading to eight more sermons (two unissued) being released on Davis's Jay Dee label. As many as 16 sermons were anticipated to be released; however, in February 1946 Davis bought out the remainder of the Reverend's recording contract for $100.00. The Reverend's later life is unknown, but it is speculated he returned to preaching until his death.

Burnett is the first individual to record the widely-covered song "Jesus Make Up My Dying Bed", although his rendition was never released officially. Nonetheless, the composition is thought to have influenced Blind Willie Johnson's version of "Jesus Make Up My Dying Bed". Versions by Charley Patton, Bob Dylan, John Sebastian, and Led Zeppelin have also followed over the years. Dylan recorded the Christian hymn, "Will the Circle Be Unbroken", in response to Burnett's version, and released the tape on the compilation album The Bootleg Series Vol. 11: The Basement Tapes Complete, in 2011.
