= Harry Smith's Anthology of American Folk Music, Vol. 4 =

Harry Smith's Anthology of American Folk Music, Volume 4

Compilation album by Various Artists
- Released: May 23, 2000
- Recorded: 1927–1940
- Genre: Country, Folk, Blues
- Length: 82:47
- Label: Revenant

Anthology of American Folk Music chronology
Anthology of American Folk Music (1952)	Harry Smith's Anthology of American Folk Music, Volume 4 (2000)

Harry Smith's Anthology of American Folk Music, Volume 4 is a two-disc compilation of twenty-eight American folk recordings originally released on 78 rpm records between 1927 and 1940, issued in May 2000 on Revenant Records, catalogue #211. Compiled by experimental filmmaker and notable eccentric Harry Smith as the fourth album of his Anthology of American Folk Music set from 1952, it was never completed by Smith himself. While the CD is out of print, an LP version has been issued, along with the other three volumes, on the Portland-based Mississippi Records label.

== Contents ==
The original anthology jump-started the folk music revival of the 1950s. In 1972, Moses Asch, interviewed by Sing Out! magazine, claimed that tapes for two additional volumes of the project had survived, although the documentation necessary to make a meaningful release of the volumes had been lost. Revenant Records worked with the Harry Smith Archive to recreate and release the fourth volume, associated by Smith with the classical element of earth. The extensive liner notes presented in a hardcover book were written by Dick Spottswood and John Fahey.

Unlike the first set, Smith did not choose the selections for this set strictly from between "1927, when electronic recording made possible accurate music reproduction, and 1932, when the Depression halted folk music sales." As a companion to his three two-album volumes from the original Anthology of American Folk Music categorized by Ballads, Social Music, and Songs, Smith chose "Labor Songs" as this volume's organizing principle. Smith included material released as late as 1940, with a selection of union songs making their first appearances for an Anthology set.

== Reception ==
Professional ratings
Review scores
Source	Rating
Allmusic	5/5 stars
The A.V. Club	(no rating)

Writing for Allmusic, critic Richie Unterberger wrote of the album "It does differ from the first three volumes in its focus on a slightly later period, with all the tracks culled from the years 1928–1940. Lead Belly, Robert Johnson, Joe Williams, Bukka White, Memphis Minnie, and John Estes are all major blues artists; the Monroe Brothers, the Carter Family, Uncle Dave Macon, and the Blue Sky Boys all giant country/bluegrass pioneers; and the Hackberry Ramblers are one of the pre-eminent Cajun groups. A few of these songs are archetypes that have burned their way into the American collective musical consciousness: John Estes' "Milk Cow Blues," the Carter Family's "No Depression in Heaven," Joe Williams' "Baby Please Don't Go," and the Monroe Brothers' "Nine Pound Hammer Is Too Heavy." Other less famous performances are quite intriguing... At 28 songs spread over two CDs, it's a little shorter than might be expected for a box set, though as compensation, it's enclosed in a pretty incredible 96-page liner-note-sized hardcover book with writing by Dick Spottswood and John Fahey."

In his The A.V. Club review, Joshua Klein wrote "Volume Four (Smith had originally promised six) is stylistically akin to the first three, with some of the artists from the earlier volumes making encore performances. As Spottswood notes, the two-disc set ignores several country developments, as well as the conspicuous invention of the electric guitar in the '30s. Fans can only hope that such key points of musical evolution will be displayed in future volumes, but as it stands, the 28 mostly Depression-era songs on Volume Four run the gamut from labor anthems to fiddle bands to ballads to blues to black gospel. It's another essential, timeless piece of the Americana puzzle, fitting nicely into the incomparable picture Smith painted."

== Track listing ==
=== Disc one ===
1. "Memphis Shakedown" — Memphis Jug Band — 3:04
2. "Dog and Gun [Old English Ballad]" — Bradley Kincaid — 3:25
3. "Black Jack David" — Carter Family — 2:41
4. "Down on the Banks of the Ohio" — Blue Sky Boys — 3:20
5. "Adieu False Heart" — Arthur Smith Trio — 2:51
6. "John Henry Was a Little Boy" — J.E. Mainer's Mountaineers — 3:13
7. "Nine Pound Hammer" — Monroe Brothers — 2:14
8. "Southern Casey Jones" — Jesse James — 2:56
9. "Cold Iron Bed" — Jack Kelly & His South Memphis Jug Band — 3:07
10. "Packin' Trunk Blues" — Lead Belly — 2:57
11. "Baby, Please Don't Go" — Joe Williams & Washboard Blues Singers — 3:25
12. "Last Fair Deal Gone Down" — Robert Johnson — 2:42
13. "Parchman Farm Blues" — Bukka White — 2:40
14. "Mean Old World" — Heavenly Gospel Singers — 2:48

=== Disc two ===
1. "Hello Stranger" — Carter Family — 2:46
2. "Stand by Me" — Sister Clara Hudmon — 3:13
3. "West Virginia Gals" — Al Hopkins & Bucklebusters — 3:05
4. "How Can a Poor Man Stand Such Times and Live?" — Blind Alfred Reed — 3:16
5. "Wreck of the Tennessee Gravy Train" — Uncle Dave Macon — 3:11
6. "Governor Al Smith" — Uncle Dave Macon — 3:08
7. "Milk Cow Blues" — Sleepy John Estes — 3:05
8. "No Depression in Heaven" — Carter Family — 2:57
9. "I'll Be Rested (When the Roll Is Called)" — Blind Roosevelt Graves — 2:32
10. "He's in the Ring (Doing the Same Old Thing)" — Memphis Minnie — 2:59
11. "The Cockeyed World" — Minnie Wallace — 3:02
12. "Barbecue Bust" — Mississippi Jook Band — 2:41
13. "Dans le Grand Bois (In the Forest)" — Hackberry Ramblers — 2:35
14. "Aces' Breakdown" — The Four Aces — 2:54
