= Lionel Ziprin =

American poet (1924–2009)

- יחיאל אריה לייב זיפּרין, Yechiel Aryeh Leib Ziprin (Leibele)
- Born: Lionel Ziprin; November 20, 1924; Lower East Side, New York City, New York, U.S.
- Died: March 15, 2009 (aged 84); Lower East Side, New York City, US
- Occupations: Rabbi, poet
- Spouse: Joanna (Joan)
- Children: 4 (daughters Zia, Dana; sons Leigh, Noah)
- Relatives: Nathan Ziprin (father); Rose Margolies Ziprin (mother), Nuftali Zvi Margolies-Abulafia (maternal grandfather)

Lionel Ziprin (November 20, 1924 – March 15, 2009) was a poet who lived on the Lower East Side of Manhattan, New York. He was also a grandson of the renowned Orthodox rabbi Naftali (or Nuftali) Zvi Margolies Abulafia, who recorded a 15-LP set of Jewish liturgical music and Yiddish folklore in a neighborhood yeshiva during the 1950s with noted ethnomusicologist Harry Smith.

== Biography ==
Ziprin was born on the Lower East Side of Manhattan to Nathan Ziprin (1898-1982) and Rose Ziprin. His father, an immigrant from Chmelnik, Russia and Pikov, Ukraine, (Note: Now both part of Khmilnyk Raion, Vinnytsia Oblast, Ukraine.) was an author and a pioneer of Jewish journalism in America, working for over a quarter century at Seven Arts Feature Syndicate and the Jewish Telegraphic Agency's Worldwide News Service as a writer in Yiddish and English, and a Yiddish to English translator. Nathan Ziprin was also an Orthodox rabbi and an attorney. His mother, also known as Sheba, (from her Hebrew name בת-שבע, or Bathsheba), was the daughter of Rabbi Naftali Zvi Margolies, and was founder of The Home of the Sages of Israel.

Ziprin was thrown out of school at age 5 for his attitude. His parents separated around that time, though they were still married when his mother died a half-century later. He had a brother Jordan.

Ziprin was sick as a child, having epilepsy and rheumatic fever. For the rest of his life, he often had visions of angels. At 19, he worked for his father's news agency employers, and saw wires coming in descriptions of the horrors of war and Auschwitz. He received a scholarship to Columbia University, but nevertheless dropped out due to poverty.

Ziprin wrote comic book scripts for Dell Comics from the late-1940s through the mid-1960s, including issues of Kona Monarch of Monster Isle and several stories depicting combat during World War II.

Ziprin had strayed from his Orthodox Jewish roots in his early to mid-adulthood. This shift was strengthened by his marriage to Joanna Eashe, known as Joan, in 1952. She was a beatnik and brought her husband into the world of avante-garde art and jazz. Their household served as a salon for the avante-garde crowd, and regular guests included Thelonious Monk, Charlie Parker, Robert Frank, Bob Dylan, and Harry Smith. The latter showed up at the couple's doorstep the day after their marriage, and spent every evening with the couple for over ten years.

The Ziprins had four children, Leigh, Noah, Dana, and Zia. Joan left Lionel around 1970, and moved to California with the children. They stayed with Timothy Leary for a while. The children were estranged from their father, but their youngest, Zia Ziprin, reconnected with him in the 1980s, when she moved back to New York and to become a designer and later a boutique owner. She was executor of his estate after his death. Her daughter, Aishling Labat, also developed a relationship with Ziprin.

The separation was a crisis point for Lionel, and he increased his religious devotion. Joan died in 1994. She is thought to be the muse for Dylan's song Visions of Joanna.

Ziprin spent most of his life attempting to find a large record label to distribute Smith's recordings of his grandfather. The effort did not receive much attention until a New Year's Day 2006 story about his quest was broadcast on National Public Radio. Following the broadcast, several prominent individuals — including the musician John Zorn — expressed an interest in finding a mainstream distributor for his grandfather's recordings.

== Kabbalah ==
Ziprin was a kabbalist since the 1950s or earlier, even before he rejoined Orthodox Judaism. He later shifted to a more ultra-Orthodox mode of Jewish observance after he and his wife separated. At times, he provided one-on-one tutoring for those who needed his assistance. Through kabbalah, Ziprin helped at least a few individuals gain insight into their problems.

At least one of his lessons was based on the pentagram and its relation to kabbalah. According to Ziprin, the pentagram is the key to figuring out a magic square which possesses an odd number of squares, and thus is heavily integrated in Jewish mysticism and numerology. It is because of this that King Solomon's battle shield was purportedly emblazoned with this design. Below is a step-by-step explanation of how the pentagram is the solution key, along with two magic squares exhibiting the proper placement of numbers to form the solution, following the various steps and alternatives.

8	1	6
3	5	7
4	9	2

- As depicted in the diagram at right, the first number should be placed in the center square of the top row.
- The next number is placed diagonally up towards the right, correlating with the first line drawn in a pentagram. Because this is an invalid option (because the number 1 is in the top row), the alternative is to proceed to the lowest available square one column to the right, corresponding the second drawn line of a pentagram.
- The next member is, as before, placed diagonally up and towards the right. However, because this is again an invalid option, and the alternative is also invalid (because we are in the right-most column), the secondary alternative is placed in the left-most square one row up, corresponding with the third drawn line of a pentagram.

10	23	1	20	15
22	5	19	14	9
4	18	13	8	21
17	12	7	25	3
11	6	24	2	16

- The next number is, as before, placed diagonally up and towards the right. However, because this spot is taken, the alternative is to place the number in the bottom-most square of the same row, corresponding to the fourth drawn line of a pentagram. Note that this does not follow the invalid rule above, because whereas before there was no square present, this time the diagonally related square exists but is occupied. This corresponds to the fourth drawn line of a pentagram.
- Should this last placement rule not be executable because the lowest square in the column to the right be occupied, the number is to be placed in the bottom-most square of the same column. This corresponds to the fifth and final drawn line of a pentagram.

The five line segments mentioned above will form a pentagram if their end-points are drawn as follows. Draw the circle with clock-face numbers around the periphery, outside of the circle. Now, within the circle, and making all points on the circumference, make a point at 7 o'clock. Draw a line to connect it to a dot at 12:30. Then draw a line from there to connect it to a point at 4 o'clock. Then draw a line to 9 o'clock. Then draw a line from there to connect to 2 o'clock. If 2 o'clock is connected with the initial 7 o'clock, a pentagram is produced. Each line drawn corresponds to the step or alternative or secondary alternative, etc. when attempting to place the next consecutive number within a magic square.

Ziprin died on March 15, 2009, due to complications of chronic obstructive pulmonary disease.

== Cultural references ==
The character "Lionel Abulafia" in the novel The Cabalist's Daughter by Yori Yanover was inspired by Lionel Ziprin. In the novel, Abulafia is a 130-year-old rabbi with mystical powers.

Lionel Ziprin is also the subject of a 10-minute black and white film HATS, made by the British post-war modernist artist Pip Benveniste in 1970. In this film, Ziprin opens and closes a suitcase full of his hat collection and, straight to camera on a run-down New York roof top, he puts on and then takes off each hat in turn. The soundtrack is the recorded Kabbalistic chanting of Ziprin's grandfather, the rabbi Reb N Z Margolies Abulafia.

== Online resources ==
- http://www.TheZiprins.com
- Lionel Ziprin's Website
- "Lionel Ziprin (1924-2009)". The Allen Ginsberg Project, allenginsberg.org.
- "Lionel Ziprin", GOODIE MAGAZINE no. 22.
- FRIEZE MAGAZINE - Fragments of a Faith Forgotten
- "The Art of Biography Cosmic Scholar: The Life and Times of Harry Smith"
- Michael Casper "Harry's Myth", Gagosian Quarterly, Winter 2023.
- From Inkweed to Haunted Ink: The Beat Greeting Card
- David Katz, "'Angels are just one more species' - David Katz meets Lionel Ziprin, mystic, maven and maverick of New York's Lower East Side", Jewish Quarterly, Number 204, Winter 2006/2007.
- The New York Times obituary, March 20, 2009.

== Sources ==
- Kalish, Jon. A Grandson's Quest to Preserve His Jewish Heritage on NPR Weekend Edition, January 1, 2006.
- Kalish, Jon. A Beatnik Finds Treasure In His Grandfather's Beats in The Jewish Daily Forward, January 27, 2006.
- Kalish, Jon. Rabbi Abulafia's Boxed Set in fiba 2006.
- Evanier, Mark. From the E-Mailbag...
