= Mose Vinson =

American singer

- Born: 1917
- Died: November 16, 2002 (aged 84–85)
- Genres: Boogie-woogie, blues, jazz
- Occupation: Musician
- Instruments: Piano, vocals
- Years active: 1930s–2002
- Labels: Sun, Bear Family, Wolf

Mose Vinson (June 2 or August 7, 1917 – November 16, 2002) was an American boogie-woogie, blues and jazz pianist and singer. His recordings included "Blues with a Feeling" and "Sweet Root Man". Vinson worked with Booker T. Laury and James Cotton.

== Biography ==
Vinson was born in Holly Springs, Mississippi. He taught himself to play the piano as a child. In his teenage years, he started playing his own style of barrelhouse boogie-woogie in juke joints in Mississippi and Tennessee, incorporating blues and jazz in his repertoire. In 1932, following a chance meeting with Sunnyland Slim, Vinson moved to Memphis, Tennessee.

In the 1930s and 1940s, Vinson continued to play at local juke house and rural community parties. By the early 1950s, he was working as a custodian at the Taylor Boarding Home, where artists often stayed while recording next door at the Sun Records studio. Sun's founder and producer, Sam Phillips, occasionally asked Vinson to accompany musicians in the studio. Vinson played there with James Cotton on "Cotton Crop Blues" (1954) and with Jimmy DeBerry on "Take a Little Chance". Phillips also allowed Vinson to record some tracks of his own, but they were not released until the 1980s. Vinson recorded two versions of "Forty-Four", one retitled "Worry You Off My Mind" and the other retitled "My Love Has Gone" (also known as "Come See Me"). Session musicians playing on these recordings included Walter Horton, Joe Hill Louis, and Joe Willie Wilkins.

After a period of lessened musical activity, by the early 1980s the Center for Southern Folklore had enlisted Vinson to perform at cultural events and at local schools. He became a regular at the Center, where he played and taught for twenty years. In 1990, his contribution to the album Memphis Piano Blues Today was recorded at his home.

In 1997, his first full-length CD compilation album was released via the Center. Declining health stopped him playing not long before his death. Vinson died of diabetes in November 2002 in Memphis, at the age of 85.

In 2007, the Memphis Music and Heritage Festival was dedicated to his memory.

In 2016 the Killer Blues Project placed a headstone for Mose Vinson at the New Park cemetery in Memphis, Tennessee.

== Dates of birth and death ==
There are conflicting reports of Vinson's date of birth and date of death. AllMusic gives them as August 7, 1917, and November 30, 2002. The Encyclopedia of Popular Music gives them as August 7, 1917, and November 16, 2002. Another on-line source gives them as June 2, 1917, and November 23, 2002. According to the Memphis Commercial Appeal newspaper published on November 19, 2002, he died on November 16, 2002.

== Quotation ==
I just play my own style, I never did practice anyone else's style.

== Discography ==
Album title	Record label	Year of release
Memphis Piano Blues Today	Wolf Records	1990
Mose Vinson: Piano Man	Center for Southern Folklore	1997

== See also ==
- List of country blues musicians
- List of Delta blues musicians
