= Chubby Parker =

- Born: Frederick R. Parker; October 23, 1876; Lafayette, Indiana
- Origin: Chicago, Illinois
- Died: 25 August 1940 (aged 63)
- Genres: folk, country, old-time
- Occupation: musician
- Instruments: banjo, harmonica, singing, whistling
- Years active: 1925–1931
- Labels: Columbia, Conqueror, Gennett, Silvertone, Supertone

Frederick R. "Chubby" Parker (October 23, 1876 - August 25, 1940) was an American old-time and folk musician and early radio entertainer.

== Background ==
Parker was born in Lafayette, Indiana on October 23, 1876. His grandparents were from Kentucky, and his father was the deputy treasurer of Tippecanoe County, Indiana. Parker graduated from Purdue University in 1898 with a degree in electrical engineering. He worked for a circus, and then moved to Chicago where he worked as a patent attorney, inventor, and electrician.

== Music career ==
In 1925 Parker began appearing frequently on the National Barn Dance program of Chicago radio station WLS. Parker played the banjo, whistled, and sang old-time and minstrel songs in his high-pitched, clear voice. The far reach of WLS made Parker a household name throughout the Midwest. During a single week in February 1927, he received 2,852 pieces of fan mail, which was believed to be a world record.

As his radio popularity grew, Parker began recording music. Between 1927 and 1931, he produced over 50 records, including many re-recordings. Sears owned WLS and many of Parker's recordings were on Sears record labels: Conqueror Records, Silvertone Records, and Supertone Records. Sears also promoted Parker's records in its mail-order catalogs.

Parker's repertoire included versions of well-known folk songs such as "Oh! Susanna", "Little Brown Jug", and "Darling Nelly Gray" as well as Henry Clay Work compositions. Other successful songs that he played on the radio and recorded included "Nickety, Nackety, Now, Now, Now", "I'm a Stern Old Bachelor", and "Get Away, Old Maids Get Away".

== Later life and legacy ==
After 1931, Parker apparently left radio and stopped recording, although he did return for the WLS twelfth anniversary celebration in 1936. Parker continued doing business in Chicago, and died on August 25, 1940.

In 1952, Harry Everett Smith released his influential Anthology of American Folk Music, and included Parker's song "King Kong Kitchie Kitchie Ki-Me-O", a version of the traditional English folk song "Frog Went A-Courting". By 2008, the British Archive of Country Music (BACM) assembled an album of Parker's music titled Chubby Parker & His Old Time Banjo: Classic Recordings 1927–1931. Mickey Avalon's 2009 song "What Do You Say?" from The Hangover also featured a sample of his song "King Kong Kitchie Kitchie Ki-Me-O." Also was featured in The SyFy series Van Helsing 2016
