= Paola Igliori =

Italian poet and photographer

- Born: Rome, Italy
- Occupation(s): Publisher, author

Paola Igliori (born in Rome, Italy), is a poet, writer, photographer, essayist and publisher. She became a resident of New York City from the 1980s, when she first moved there, until 2003 when she returned to her home country. Paola Igliori has a son Filippo, who is a photographer and film maker.

== Biography ==
Igliori's parents habitually invited poets, writers, and other artists at the family estate of Villa Lina, near Rome, where young Paola and her four brothers and sisters, Benedetta, Gaia, Ulisse and Alessandro, spent their summers and "grew up in between the intellectual, scholarly and creative milieu that surrounded [her] and the root elders".

In the mid 1980s Paola relocated to New York with her then-husband, artist Sandro Chia. While in New York, she wrote her first book, Entrails, Heads, and Tails, which contained photographic essays and conversations with artists such as Louise Bourgeois, James Turrell, Enzo Cucchi, Vito Acconci, Cy Twombly, Gilbert & George, Francesco Clemente, Sigmar Polke, Julian Schnabel, Wolfgang Laib, and others, published by Rizzoli in 1991. The book was described by some critics "an exploration of creativity through the everyday life".

Igliori's conversations with artists, and her photo essays, have appeared in magazines in many countries, such as Artscribe, Interview, and Wolkenkratzer.

In 1990, she started the publishing label of Inanout Press, based in New York City, essentially a "one-woman band from thought to distribution." putting out publications such as Chocolate Creams & Dollars (1992), Paul Bowles' collaboration with Moroccan storyteller Mohammed Mrabet; Stickman (1994); and others.

In 1996, she edited and published American Magus: A Modern Alchemist, a book about then largely unknown (though well known among artists, since the 1950s) American artist, painter, poet, film maker, essayist and collector Harry Everett Smith. Igliori had developed a strong personal relationship with Smith, who, by some accounts, died in 1992 in her arms "singing as he drifted away", at the Hotel Chelsea. In 2001, she wrote and directed a documentary about Smith, titled American Magus.

In 2003, Iglori relocated back to Villa Lina, in Italy, which, for a few years, she operated as a residential estate, also organising social events.

== Bibliography ==
- Igliori, Paola. Entrails, Heads & Tails; photographic essays and conversations on the everyday, Rizzoli, New York, 1992, ASIN B002J7QO3O
- American Magus Harry Smith: A Modern Alchemist, about Harry Everett Smith edited by Paola Igliori. New York, New York: Inanout Press, 1996, 286 pages, ISBN 0-9625119-9-4
- Trudell, John. Stickman: Poems, Lyrics, Talks, edited by Paola Igliori. New York, New York: Inanout Press, 1999, 168 pages, ISBN 978-0-9625119-8-1

== Filmography ==
- American Magus (2002)
