= Luis Kemnitzer =

American anthropologist

Kemnitzer wearing his Grammy Award medal

Luis Stowell Kemnitzer (November 13, 1928 in Pasadena, California– February 17, 2006) was an American anthropologist known for his social and political activism.

From 1967 to 1994, Kemnitzer was a professor at San Francisco State University, where in 1969 he taught that institution's first course in American Indian Studies. In this role, Kemnitzer visited Alcatraz Island during its occupation—which had been partially planned in his classroom, and among whose participants were some of his students (including Richard Oakes) — to provide logistical advice on how to set up educational programs for Native American children on the island.

== Life and work ==
Kemnitzer began his academic career in the 1940s, studying public health at the University of California, Berkeley, but withdrew to become a brakeman on the Southern Pacific Railroad. His experiences in the labor force led him to join the Communist Party USA. In the 1960s, he earned his doctorate in anthropology from the University of Pennsylvania, after writing a dissertation based on his experiences living among the Oglala Lakota on the Pine Ridge Indian Reservation. He subsequently became director of the Lakota Language and Culture Center. His published research included studies of syncretism among the Lakota; railroad workers' time perception; and needle exchange programmes.

As an activist, Kemnitzer helped establish the first needle exchange programme in San Francisco's Tenderloin district; and attempted to distribute condoms to Bohemian Grove attendees. In 2005, he and his partner Moher Downing posed naked for the 2006 "Hotties of Harm Reduction" calendar. The 2007 calendar was dedicated to his memory after he died of lung cancer in February 2006.

In 1997, Kemnitzer, who had for many years been an avid record collector, helped create the liner notes for the Smithsonian Folkways Recordings reissue of Anthology of American Folk Music (originally compiled by Harry Everett Smith, with whom Kemnitzer had been friends). He subsequently shared in the 1998 Grammy Award for Best Album Notes.
