= Jilson Setters =

American folk singer and fiddler

Jilson Setters (left) with his wife.

Jilson Setters (born James William Day 1861 – May 6, 1942), was an American folk singer and fiddle player who was also known to perform under the monikers Blind Bill Day, J.W. Day, and the "Singin' Fiddler of Lost Hope Hollow." Setters was discovered by folklorist Jean Bell Thomas, who fabricated a persona for him, arranged recording sessions with RCA Records, and promoted him around the U.S. and England until the late-1930s.

== Early life and work ==
James William Day was born in Catlettsburg, Kentucky in 1861. Day was not born blind, but rather through inconclusive circumstances developed the impairment sometime in his early youth. He was a self-taught fiddle player who performed at town halls and dances, sometimes under the stage name "Blind Bill Day", and occasionally supported himself by begging on the streets. In 1906, Day had a procedure to remove the cataracts from his eyes, thus restoring his eyesight. Though he had an adequate ability to see, Day still performed with his "Blind Bill Day" moniker.

In 1926, Day was discovered by promoter and folklorist Jean Bell Thomas, who was fascinated that rural folk musicians like Day possessed traits that had been passed down from their Elizabethan English forebears relatively unaltered, especially in their renditions of folk ballads. Thomas decided to manage Day, creating and documenting a persona almost entirely fabricated from her. According to Thomas's story, Day, who changed his name to Jilson Setters per her suggestion, was blind from birth, lived in isolation in the mountains, and gained his eyesight only recently, thanks to a procedure that Thomas financed. Moreover, with his ability to see, Setters was shocked by the appearance of the civilized world. Setters recorded ten sides for RCA Records in New York City, including "The Wild Wagoner", which has become a standard in traditional folk repertoires.

In February 1930, Thomas published a heavily fictionalized article in American Magazine, entitled "Blind Jilson: Singin' Fiddler of Lost Hope Hollow", detailing Thomas first encountering Setters, their arrangement of his operation, and radio station work in New York City. In 1931, Setters traveled to London to perform at Royal Albert Hall, and for King George V and Mary of Teck. Upon his return to the U.S., Setters was the featured performer in the American Folk Song Festival, which was managed by Thomas from 1930 to 1972. However, whether it was a consequence of insufficient record sales or lack of interest, Thomas abandoned her project with Setters. Setters continued to perform well into the 1930s and early 1940s.

== Death ==
He died on May 6, 1942, in Cattlesburg, Kentucky.
