= Sister Clara Hudmon =

Sister Clara Hudmon, also known as The Georgia Peach, (October 10, 1899 – 1966) was an American gospel singer. First recording for Okeh Records in 1930, Hudmon is best-remembered for her rendition of Reverend Charles Albert Tindley's composition "Stand by Me". She was a member of Reverend J. M. Gates's congregation and later received notice on the compilation album Harry Smith's Anthology of American Folk Music, Vol. 4.

== Biography ==
Born in Atlanta, Georgia, Hudmon formed a vocal trio with her brothers Ralph and Luther at an early age, and sang in Reverend J. M. Gates's congregation at Mount Calvary Baptist Church. Hudmon became very established in the religious community, associating with figures such as Claude Joseph Johnson, who later became a reverend and recorded sermons. At age 16, Hudmon quit school and moved in with Reverend T. T. Gholston, working as a nurse for the Reverend's ailing wife. Just six months after his wife's death, Gholston married 18 year-old Hudmon, who assumed the role of surrogate mother to the Reverend's two children. Church members objected to the circumstances of the union, making the family public outcasts, and resulting in the Reverend resorting to alcoholism. After Gholston attempted to deliver a sermon while intoxicated, the family was ostracized from the community, and relocated to Detroit, then New York City. The couple divorced soon after.

On December 12, 1930, perhaps as a result of a recommendation by Gates, Hudmon recorded for Okeh Records. Joined by Deacon Leon Davis and Sisters Jordan and Norman, individuals who recorded with Gates between 1927 and 1930, Hudmon completed, among other compositions, her best-known song: a rendition of Reverend Charles Albert Tindley's hymn "Stand by Me". As explained in the book Undercurrent: The Hidden Wiring of Modern Music, Hudmon's "scarred but studied delivery" helped unveil a new era of gospel music centered around the writings of Tindley and Thomas A. Dorsey. Her cover of "Stand by Me" was collected on Harry Smith's Anthology of American Folk Music, Vol. 4 in 2000, featured as the first genuine gospel song on the compilation album. Hudmon's other notable song is her take on "When the Saints Go Marching In", which was recorded both in 1931 and 1932.

Hudmon continued recording throughout the 1930s, sometimes credited as Clara Belle Gholston and Clara Gholston Brock or Brook. Her career was bolstered by a string of successful concerts, particularly an appearance at the Radio City Music Hall, in 1939. Throughout the 1940s, Hudmon recorded under the moniker the Georgia Peach, cutting sides for Decca Records, among other record labels. She recorded until 1960 and died sometime in 1966. Hudmon's work has since appeared on several compilation albums released on Document Records. In 2005, the Swedish label, Gospel Friend, issued Lord Let Me Be More Humble in This World, a 24-track sampling of her recordings between 1930 and 1960.
