= Booker T. Laury =

American pianist and singer (1914–1995)

- Born: Lawrence Laury; September 2, 1914; Memphis, Tennessee, United States
- Died: September 23, 1995 (aged 81) Memphis, Tennessee
- Genres: Boogie-woogie, blues, gospel, jazz
- Occupations: Pianist, singer
- Instruments: Piano, vocals
- Years active: 1930s–1995

Lawrence "Booker T." Laury (September 2, 1914 – September 23, 1995) was an American boogie-woogie, blues, gospel and jazz pianist and singer. Laury worked with Memphis Slim and Mose Vinson but did not record his debut album until he was in his late sixties. He appeared in two films: Great Balls of Fire!, the biopic about Jerry Lee Lewis' early career, and the documentary Deep Blues: A Musical Pilgrimage to the Crossroads, in which musicologist, writer and blues producer Robert Palmer, along with Dave Stewart from the band Eurythmics, interview and play with blues musicians from Memphis, Tennessee, and the North Hill Country of Mississippi.

== Biography ==
Laury was born in Memphis, Tennessee, and grew up with his lifelong friend Memphis Slim. At the age of six, after helping his mother play the family's pump organ, Laury learned to play the keyboards. His barrelhouse playing style, which he developed alongside Slim, was based on the influence of the Memphis performers Roosevelt Sykes, Sunnyland Slim, and Speckled Red. In the early 1930s, and in the company of the younger Mose Vinson, Slim and Laury began playing in local clubs.

In 1935, Sykes suggested to Laury and Slim that they relocate to Chicago, with a view to obtaining a recording contract. Slim took the advice, but Laury remained in Memphis, where he played in gambling houses and clubs for decades. Laury had a large hand width, which enabled him to span ten keys. His playing dexterity was such that, after losing one finger on his left hand following an accident with a circular saw in the 1950s, he was still able to play well. Based around Beale Street in Memphis, as that area started to degenerate, Laury traveled around Tennessee, Arkansas and Missouri. Despite differing fortunes, his friendship with Slim did not diminish over the years, up to Slim's death in 1988.

Laury recorded his debut album in his late sixties, entitled Booker T. Laury and Friends: Nothing but the Blues, released on the France-based record label Blue Silver in 1981. A 1980 Paris concert was released by Indigo Records in France in 1982.

The 1989 Dennis Quaid film Great Balls of Fire! portrayed the young Jerry Lee Lewis and Jimmy Swaggart looking into a juke joint to see Laury playing "Big Legged Woman." The attention helped boost Laury's popularity.

In 1994, Bullseye Blues Records issued Nothin' but the Blues, an album of Laury's voice and piano, performing seven original compositions, two covers, and a story about how he got the nickname "Slop Jar" from his peers. The same year, the Austrian label Wolf Records released a live album, containing concert recordings made in 1987.

Laury died of cancer in September 1995, at the age of 81, in Memphis. He has a brass note on Beale Street's Walk of Fame.

== Discography ==
Album title	Record label	Year of release
Nothing but the Blues	Blue Silver	1981
Live	Indigo	1982
Memphis Piano Blues Today	Wolf	1990
Booker in Paris	EPM Musique	1993
Nothin' but the Blues	Bullseye Blues	1994
Blues on the Prowl	Wolf	1994

== See also ==
- List of blues musicians
- List of boogie woogie musicians
- List of gospel blues musicians
- List of Memphis blues musicians
