= Early Abstractions =

- Directed by: Harry Smith
- Running time: 23 minutes
- Country: United States

Early Abstractions is a collection of seven short animated films created by Harry Everett Smith between 1939 and 1956. Each film is between two and six minutes long, and is named according to the chronological order in which it was made. The collection includes Numbers 1–5, 7, and 10, while the missing Numbers 8 and 9 are presumed to have been lost.

== Inspiration ==
The idea of the numbering was to suggest a coherent link between each individual film, and that they were to be treated not just on their own but as part of a larger body of work.

== Techniques ==
Of the missing chapters, Number 6 was made up of three-dimensional optically printed abstractions; Number 8 was a black and white collage of clippings taken from nineteenth century ladies wear catalogues and elocution books, and Number 9 was a color collage of biology books and nineteenth century temperance movement posters. The remaining films show a gradual evolution in Smith's technical complexity, with blunt abstraction rudimentary motion more prominent in the early shorts, in contrast to an allegoric dance of Tarot cards, and Buddhist and Cabalistic symbols.

== Soundtrack ==
Initially recorded with no sound, a medley of music by The Beatles was added retrospectively. Because the songs do not exactly sync up with each individual film, some critics have opined that this does not enhance the film, and recommend watching it in silence.

== Legacy ==
In 2006, Early Abstractions was selected for preservation in the National Film Registry by the Librarian of Congress for its "cultural, historical, or aesthetic significance". The Academy Film Archive preserved films 1, 2, and 3 of Abstractions.
