= D.C. Rice =

Reverend D. C. Rice (c. 1888 in Barbour County, Alabama – March 1973 in Montgomery, Alabama) was a preacher and singer. He was raised as a Baptist by his father, and moved to Chicago during World War I. There he joined The Church of the Living God, Pentecostal, and in 1920 became a preacher in this denomination.

Following the examples of Rev. J. M. Gates and Rev. F. W. McGee, in March 1928 Rice made his first recordings for the Vocalion label in Chicago, and over the period until July 1930 he recorded a total of 28 sides although two are lost. These are described in terms such as "Rev D. C. Rice, sermons with singing, assisted by His Congregation". Many of the performances begin with Rice intoning a verse from the Bible and then giving a short sermon, his voice rising and falling with blues inflections, while members of the congregation respond with "amen". Then Rice leads the ensemble into a hymn, generally of an evangelical type. Rice's singing dominates the recordings, the other singers providing harmonized support. The instrumental accompaniment is by piano plus one or more of mandolin, string or brass bass, triangle or other small percussion, trumpet, and trombone.

Rice continued to be active in black churches, as a preacher and ultimately a bishop. Music continued to feature in his religious career but no further recordings are known after 1930. His 1928-30 recordings have been issued on LP (Herwin Records) and on CD (Document Records), finding favour with enthusiasts for early gospel music, blues, and jazz.

== See also ==
- List of gospel blues musicians
