= Lake, West Virginia =

- Unincorporated community
- Location within West Virginia Location within the United States
- Coordinates: 37°55′47″N 81°54′01″W
- Country: United States
- State: West Virginia
- County: Logan
- Elevation: 961 ft (293 m)
- Time zone: UTC-5 (Eastern (EST))
  - Summer (DST): UTC-4 (EDT)
- ZIP code: 25121
- Area codes: 304 & 681
- GNIS feature ID: 1541312

Lake is an unincorporated community in Logan County, West Virginia, United States. Lake is 4.5 miles (7.2 km) east-northeast of Mitchell Heights. Lake has a post office with ZIP code 25121.

The community was named after Nicholas Lake, the original owner of the town site.
