= Harry Everett Smith =

American polymath (1923-1991)

Harry E. Smith
- Smith in 1965
- Born: May 29, 1923; Portland, Oregon, U.S.
- Died: November 27, 1991 (aged 68); New York City, U.S.
- Occupations: Visual artist, filmmaker, ethnographer
- Known for: Anthology of American Folk Music; Heaven and Earth Magic
- Awards: Grammy

Harry Everett Smith (May 29, 1923 – November 27, 1991) was an American polymath, who was credited variously as an artist, experimental filmmaker, bohemian, mystic, record collector, hoarder, student of anthropology and Neo-Gnostic bishop.

Smith was an important figure in the Beat Generation scene in New York City, and his activities, such as his use of mind-altering substances and interest in esoteric spirituality, anticipated aspects of the Hippie movement. Besides his films, such as his full length cutout animated film Heaven and Earth Magic (1962), Smith is also remembered for his influential Anthology of American Folk Music, drawn from his extensive collection of out-of-print commercial 78 rpm recordings.

Throughout his life Smith was an inveterate collector. Other than records, his collections included string figures, paper airplanes, Seminole textiles, and Ukrainian Easter eggs.

== Biography ==
Harry Smith was born in Portland, Oregon, and spent his earliest years in Washington state in the area between Seattle and Bellingham. As a child, he lived for a time with his family in Anacortes, Washington, a town on Fidalgo Island, where the Swinomish Indian reservation is located. He attended high school in nearby Bellingham.

Smith's parents were Theosophists with Pantheistic tendencies (involving the belief in an immanent God who is identical with the universe or nature), and both were fond of folk music. His mother, Mary Louise, originally from Sioux City, Iowa, came from a long line of school teachers and herself taught for a time on the Lummi Indian reservation near Bellingham. His father, Robert James Smith, a fisherman, worked as a watchman for the Pacific American Fishery, a salmon canning company. Smith's paternal great-grandfather, John Corson Smith (d. 1910), had been a Union colonel in the American Civil War, brevetted brigadier general just as the war ended, and had served from 1885 to 1889 as lieutenant governor of the state of Illinois. He had also been a prominent Freemason and authored several books about the history of the order.

Smith's parents, who did not get along, lived in separate houses, meeting only at dinner time. Although poor, they gave their son an artistic education, including 10 years of drawing and painting lessons. For a time, it is said, they ran an art school in their house. Smith was a voracious reader and he recalled his father bringing him a copy of Carl Sandburg's folksong anthology, American Songbag. "We were considered some kind of 'low' family", Smith once said, "despite my mother's feeling that she was [an incarnation of] the Czarina of Russia". Friends recall that in high school Smith carried around a camera, and in his high school yearbook said that he wanted to compose symphonic music.

Physically, Smith was undersized and had a curvature of the spine which kept him from being drafted (a circumstance that later would disqualify him from benefitting from the G.I. Bill). During World War II, he took a job as a mechanic working nights on the construction of the tight, hard-to-reach interior of Boeing bomber planes, for which his short stature suited him. Smith used the money he made from his job to buy blues records. The money also enabled him to study anthropology at the University of Washington in Seattle for five semesters between 1942 and the fall of 1944. He focused on American Indian tribes concentrated in the Pacific Northwest, making numerous field trips to document the music and customs of the Lummi, whom he had gotten to know through his mother's work with them.

When the war ended Smith, now 22, moved to the Bay Area of San Francisco, then home to a lively bohemian folk music and jazz scene. As a collector of blues records, he had already been corresponding with the noted blues record aficionado James McKune. He now also began seriously collecting old hillbilly music records from junk dealers and stores which were going out of business and even appeared as a guest on a folk music radio show hosted by poet Jack Spicer. In 1948, his mother succumbed to cancer. Immediately after her funeral, Smith, who was estranged from his father, left Berkeley for a room above a well known after-hours jazz club in the Fillmore district of San Francisco. Smith was especially drawn to bebop, a new jazz form which had originated during impromptu jam sessions before and after paid performances; and San Francisco abounded in night spots and after hours clubs where Dizzy Gillespie and Charlie Parker could be heard. At this time he painted several ambitious jazz-inspired abstract paintings (since destroyed) and began making animated avant garde films featuring patterns that he painted directly on the film stock and which were intended to be shown to the accompaniment of bebop music.

In 1950, Smith received a Guggenheim grant to complete an abstract film. This enabled him first to visit and later move to New York City. He arranged for his collections, including his records, to be shipped to the East Coast. He said that "one reason he moved to New York was to study the Cabala". And, 'I wanted to hear Thelonious Monk play'." When his grant money ran out, he brought what he termed "the cream of the crop" of his record collection to Moe Asch, president of Folkways Records, with the idea of selling it. Instead, Asch proposed that the 27-year-old Smith use the material to edit a multi-volume anthology of American folk music in long playing format – then a newly developed, cutting edge medium – and he provided space and equipment in his office for Smith to work in. The recording engineer on the project was Péter Bartók, son of the renowned composer and folklorist.

In this period and through the early 1960s, Smith became close to Lionel Ziprin, becoming a frequent houseguest. Ziprin supplied Smith with peyote, and introduced Smith to his Kabalist grandfather, Naftali Tzvi Margolies. Smith recorded many hours of audio with Margolies over a two-year period.

=== Anthologist of American folk music ===
The resultant Folkways anthology, issued in August 1952 under the title Anthology of American Folk Music, was a compilation of recordings of folk music issued on hillbilly and race records that had been released commercially on 78 rpm. These dated from the abbreviated dawn, sometimes called the "golden age", of the commercial country music industry, that is, between 1927, when, as Smith explained, "acoustic recording [sic] made possible accurate music reproduction, and 1932, when the Depression halted folk music sales", and the artists, in many cases, sank into obscurity. Originally issued as budget discs marketed to regional, rural audiences, these records had long been known, collected, and occasionally reissued by folklorists and aficionados, but this was the first time such a large compilation was made available to affluent, non-specialist urban dwellers. A scholar later commented that Smith was "not down in Appalachia with a tape recorder," as collectors in the 1930s had been, and he "wasn't interested in pure tradition, like there was a source." Instead, he continued, Smith was interested in "commercial recordings that were already packagings of music that he could organize."

LP discs could hold much more material than three-minute 78s, and had greater fidelity and far less surface noise. The Anthology was packaged as a set of three boxed albums with a total of 6 LPs. The front of each box a different color: red, blue, and green – in Smith's schema, representing the alchemical elements. Priced at $25.00 per two-disc set, they were relatively expensive. For those with little money, Moe Asch maintained a retail record store in the 1950s near Union Square Park where he sold all 6 of the Anthology records for $1 each, as well as others from his catalogue. The $1 records were sold without their original jackets and with a hole punched through the label area to indicate that the record was remaindered and not to be sold for the full retail price. A fourth album, comprising topical songs from the Depression era, was originally planned by Asch and his long-time assistant, Marian Distler, and never completed by Smith. It was issued in 2000, nine years after his death, in CD format by Revenant Records with a 95-page booklet of tribute essays to Smith.

The music on Smith's Anthology, performed by such artists as Clarence Ashley, Dock Boggs, The Carter Family, Sleepy John Estes, Mississippi John Hurt, Dick Justice, Blind Lemon Jefferson, Buell Kazee, and Bascom Lamar Lunsford, greatly influenced the folk & blues revivals of the 1950s and 60s and were covered by The New Lost City Ramblers, Bob Dylan, and Joan Baez, to name a few. Rock critic Greil Marcus, in his liner-note essay for the 1997 Smithsonian reissue, quoted musician Dave van Ronk's avowal that "We all knew every word of every song on it, including the ones we hated."

Smith's presentation was a marked departure from the more social or politically oriented folk song collections of the 1930s and 40s. His annotations avoided localized historical and social commentary, consisting instead of terse, evocative synopses – riffs – written in the manner of telegraph messages or newspaper headlines as though from an otherworldly realm, seemingly both timeless and avant-garde. For example, for Chubby Parker's rendition of "King Kong Kitchie Kitchie Ki-Me-O" ("Frog Went A-Courting"), a ballad that has been traced to 1548, Smith wrote: "Zoologic Miscegeny Achieved Mouse Frog Nuptuals [sic], Relatives Approve."

Smith was also unique in associating folk music with the occult: the design he chose to be printed on the box covers, for example, was taken from an engraving by Theodore de Bry of a great hand tuning the Celestial Monochord (the one-stringed instrument symbolizing the music of the spheres), that had illustrated a sixteenth-century treatise on music by the Elizabethan magus Robert Fludd.

Smith told interviewer John Cohen that he had first heard this kind of record at the home of Bertrand Harris Bronson, the eminent English professor and ballad scholar, who collected them. In 1946 Smith reportedly lived for a time in a small room with a separate entrance on the first floor of Bronson's Berkeley residence, and it is thought he may have received informal tutelage in folk music through his acquaintance with the scholar.

Smith also told Cohen that in selecting his material he relied heavily on the Library of Congress's mimeographed "List of American Folk Songs on Commercial Records", a monograph compiled by Alan Lomax in 1940 with the assistance of Pete Seeger, that Lomax and Seeger had sent out to folk song scholars (and which could also be purchased directly from the Library for 25 cents).

Cohen asked Smith: "Where did you first hear of the Carter Family?"

Smith: I would think from that mimeographed list that the Library of Congress issued around 1937 [sic], "American Folksongs on Commercially Available Records" [sic]. Shortly after that, two Carter Family recordings, "Worried Man Blues" and "East Virginia Blues" were reissued on the album Smoky Mountain Ballads. That album would come to stores that wouldn't ordinarily have Carter Family records.

John Cohen: In that album John and Alan Lomax made hillbilly music respectable enough to have it sold along with art music and symphonies.

Twelve of the 60 songs and many of the artists on Lomax and Seeger's "List" appear in Smith's anthology and his notes credit the Lomaxes. Smith explained that he had selected material based on what he thought would be of interest to scholars and to people who might like to sing them. He also told Cohen that, "I felt social change would result from it. I'd been reading Plato's Republic. He's jabbering about music, how you have to be careful about changing the music, because it might upset or destroy the government. Everybody gets out of step. You are not to arbitrarily change it because you may undermine the Empire State Building without knowing it. Of course, I thought it would do that ... I imagined it as having some kind of social force for good".

In 1991, shortly before his death, Smith was the recipient of a Grammy, the Chairman's Merit Award for Lifetime Achievement. Ed Sanders writes:

It was a joy to his many friends to see him clambering up the Grammy steps wearing a tuxedo. "I'm glad to say that my dreams came true – I saw America changed through music," he told the audience. "Plato was right, music can change the direction of a civilization, for worse or better."

In 1997, Smith's collection was re-released as a boxed set of six CDs on Smithsonian Folkways Recordings, as the Anthology of American Folk Music (now also informally referred to as "The Harry Smith Anthology").

In his notes to a 2006 revival CD, Elvis Costello wrote: "We're lucky that somebody compiled the Anthology as intelligently and as imaginatively so that it can tell a series of stories to future musicians and listeners, and be a starting point."

A conference, "Harry Smith: The Avant Garde in the American Vernacular," was held in 1991 at University of California at Los Angeles.

=== Other recording projects ===
In the 1950s, Smith recorded a 15-LP set of Rabbi Nuftali Zvi Margolies Abulafia, grandfather of Lionel Ziprin. Smith became interested in recording Rabbi Abulafia after hearing him chanting and recorded the set of chants and prayers in the Rabbi's synagogue. Due to difficulties in finding a suitable record label, the complete set remains unreleased.

In addition to compiling the Folkways anthology, Smith was also instrumental in getting Folkways to produce The Fugs First Album, on its Broadside label in 1965. A regular visitor to the Peace Eye bookstore, in Manhattan's East Village on 10th Street between Avenues B and Ave C, founded in 1965 by poet Ed Sanders, Smith had advised Sanders which books about Native American studies the store ought to stock. When Sanders and Tuli Kupferberg formed the Fugs, they rehearsed at Peace Eye. "Thanks to Harry," writes Sanders, "the band was able to record an album within weeks of forming." Peter Stampfel recalled that, as the album's editor and producer, "Harry's contribution to the proceedings were his presence, inspiration, and best of all, smashing a wine bottle against the wall while we were recording 'Nothing,'" But Sanders recalled learning a lot from watching Smith's adept, businesslike tape editing at the Folkways studio, adding that, as far as he knew, Smith received no financial reward for his work. He asked for a bottle of rum, which Sanders bought for him, and then proceeded to smash the bottle against the wall, to "spur us to greater motivity and energy", Sanders speculated.

In 1971–73, Smith recorded performances held at his room at the Hotel Chelsea (for a project called "deonage") of, among other things, spontaneously composed folk and protest songs written and performed by his long-time friend, Allen Ginsberg, accompanying himself on the harmonium. These included, "CIA Dope Calypso", "MacDougal Street Blues", "Bus Ride Ballad Ride to Suva", and "Dope Fiend Blues", among others, all later issued on an LP entitled New York Blues: Rags, Ballads and Harmonium Songs (Folkways, 1981).

In keeping with his interest in chemically altered states of consciousness, Smith made field recordings documenting Kiowa peyote meeting songs, which Folkways issued as a multi-LP set.

=== Experimental films ===
Critical attention has been most often paid to Smith's experimental work with film. He produced extravagant abstract animations. The effects were often painted or manipulated by hand directly on the celluloid. Themes of mysticism, surrealism and dada were common elements in his work.

Information, especially about Smith's early films, is uncertain, due to the work-in-progress nature of experimental filmmaking. He frequently reedited them (hence the different runtimes), incorporating on various occasions reassembled footage of different film to be viewed with varying music tracks. For instance, the handmade films now known as No. 1, 2, 3, and 5 were accompanied by an improvising jazz band on May 12, 1950 when they premiered as part of the Art in Cinema series curated by Smith's friend Frank Stauffacher at the San Francisco Museum of Art, though Smith had originally intended them to be accompanied by recordings of beat favorite Dizzy Gillespie. Later he showed the films with random records or even the radio as accompaniment. Smith stated that his films were made for contemporary music, and he kept changing their soundtracks. At the urging of his friend Rosemarie "Rosebud" Feliu-Pettet, Smith also re-cut Early Abstractions to sync with Meet the Beatles!. After Smith's death, artists such as John Zorn, Philip Glass or DJ Spooky provided musical backgrounds for screenings of his films: Zorn at many screenings at Anthology Film Archives (where he is composer-in-residence) as part of his Essential Cinema project, Glass at the 2004 summer benefit concert of the Film-Makers' Cooperative and DJ Spooky at several venues in 1999 for Harry Smith: A Re-creation, an embroidered compendium of Smith's films put together by his close collaborator M. Henry Jones who tries to screen the films in the manner intended by Smith - as performances - using stroboscopic effects, multiple projections, magic lanterns, and the like.

The present-day numbering system which Smith introduced some time between 1951 and 1964–65 (the year the Film-Makers' Cooperative started distributing 16 mm copies of his films) includes only films that survived up to that point. Thus this filmography is in no way a comprehensive list of all the films he has ever made, all the more as he is known to have lost, sold, traded or even wantonly destroyed some of his own works. The dating of the film presents another puzzle. Since Smith frequently worked for years on them and kept little to no documentation, the information varies considerably from one source to another. Therefore all available information has been added to the following list, inevitably resulting in a loss of clarity but having the advantage of giving the whole picture. The films are also known by variant designation, i.e. Film No. 1, Film # 1 or simply # 1.

Since the 1970s, Smith's films have been archived and preserved by Anthology Film Archives in New York City.

The Academy Film Archive preserved Abstractions, films 1-3 by Harry Smith.

=== Visual art ===
Smith's early efforts in the field of fine art painting were freeform abstractions intended to visually represent notes, measures, beats and riffs of the beatnik era jazz music that inspired him.

There is photographic evidence of Smith's large paintings created in the 1940s; however, the works were destroyed by Smith himself. He did not destroy his work on film (although he did misplace a few) and this legacy supplements the nature and design of his paintings. Smith created several later works, some of which have been serially printed in limited editions. Much of his imagery is inspired by Kabbalistic themes such as the Sephirah, where the Planetary Spheres are distributed like musical notes upon a staff.

=== Occult interests ===
Smith said he had become acquainted with the Lummi Indians through his mother's teaching work and claimed to have participated in shamanic initiation at a young age. He recorded Lummi songs and rituals using homemade equipment and notation of his own devising, and had an important collection of Native American religious objects.

Tarot was another of Smith's interests. A set of "irregularly-shaped Tarot cards" he designed was apparently used for the degree certificates for a branch of Ordo Templi Orientis founded by occultist Aleister Crowley. In the late 1940s in California Smith is said to have worked with Charles Stansfeld Jones, the one-time acolyte of Crowley. Smith would later study under Jones's "trusted student", Albert Handel in New York.

Smith frequented the Samuel Weiser Antiquarian Bookstore, a used book store on New York's "Book Row" that specialized in works on comparative religion, hermeticism, and the occult. The store's publishing house, Weiser Books, used Smith's designs for its paperback edition of Aleister Crowley's Holy Books of Thelema.

Sanders recounts that Smith was the key advisor for Allen Ginsberg and The Fugs's effort to levitate The Pentagon. "In the fall of 1967", Sanders wrote:

a bunch of us decided to exorcise the demons from the Pentagon as part of a big demonstration against the Vietnam War. (You can get a flavor of that day from Norman Mailer's Armies of the Night.) I was in charge of coming up with a structure for the Exorcism. I knew Harry would know what to do so I conferred with him. He gave me the basic outline, which was to use the symbols of the four directions, and to use the symbols of earth, air, fire, and water. He also suggested adding a cow, to represent the Goddess Hathor. We did have a cow prepared, painted with mythic symbols, but the police stopped it from getting near the Pentagon. The Exorcism was duly recorded by WBAI's Bob Fass, and can be found on the Fugs album Tenderness Junction.

Smith also studied the Enochian system in depth and as it was recounted by Edward Kelley and John Dee, which was later elaborated upon by the Hermetic Order of the Golden Dawn and the aforementioned OTO. He compiled a concordance of the Enochian language with the aid of Khem Caigan, his assistant throughout much of the 1970s and early 1980s.

In 1986 Smith was consecrated a bishop in the Ecclesia Gnostica Catholica, an order which lists William Blake and Giordano Bruno in its pantheon of saints. Smith was long a familiar figure in the New York branch of the OTO. In 2023, Smith was accorded a very rare honor of being canonized a Gnostic Saint in the Ecclesia Gnostica Catholica by Hymenaeus Beta, the head of the EGC.

=== Later life and death ===
Smith lived at the Hotel Chelsea on West 23rd Street in New York City, residing in Room #731 from 1968 to 1977, after which he was "sometimes 'stranded' at hotels where he would owe so much money he couldn't leave, and he was too famous just to be thrown out". This was the case at the Breslin Hotel at 28th and Broadway, where Smith lived until 1985, when his friend, poet Allen Ginsberg, took him into his home on East 12th Street. While living with Ginsberg, Smith designed the cover for two of Ginsberg's books, White Shroud and Collected Poems, as well as continuing to work on his own films and to record ambient sounds. For many years he subsisted on a diet of raw eggs, vodka and amphetamine tablets. By this time, Smith was suffering from severe health and dental problems and proved a difficult guest. Ginsberg's psychiatrist finally told him that Smith would have to leave because he was bad for Ginsberg's blood pressure (Ginsberg was already suffering from the cardiovascular disease that would end his life). In 1988, Ginsberg arranged for Smith to teach shamanism at the Naropa Institute (now Naropa University) in Boulder, Colorado. When Ginsberg, who was paying all of Smith's expenses, realized Smith was using the money he was sending him for rent to buy alcohol, he hired Rani Singh, then a student at Naropa, to look after him, but not before Smith had amassed substantial debts that Ginsberg would be responsible for. Singh, now an author and art curator, has since devoted much of her life to furthering Smith's legacy.

Smith returned to New York, staying for a while with friends in Cooperstown, New York, and ending up at one point at Francis House, a home for derelicts on the Bowery. All the while, he continued to tape ambient sounds, including "the dying coughs and prayers of impoverished sick people in adjacent cubicles."

In November 1991, Smith suffered a bleeding ulcer followed by cardiac arrest in Room 328 at the Hotel Chelsea in New York City. His friend, poet Paola Igliori, described him as dying in her arms, "singing as he drifted away". Smith was pronounced dead one hour later at St. Vincent's Hospital.

Following Smith's death, his branch of the OTO performed a Gnostic Mass in his honor at St. Mark's Church in the East Village. Smith's ashes were placed in the care of his friend, longtime participant in New York's Beat scene, Rosemarie "Rosebud" Feliu-Pettet, whom Paola Igliori has described as Smith's "spiritual wife."

== Filmography ==
- Early Abstractions (1939-56 or 1941-57 or 1946-52 or 1946-57) (assembled ca. 1964) 16 mm, black & white and color, 22 min. Originally silent, then accompanied by a reel-to-reel tape with songs by The Fugs—whose first album Smith produced, and subsequently by an optical soundtrack featuring Meet the Beatles!. The 1987 video release features Teiji Ito's musical piece Shaman. At first, the anthology included only No. 1-4, later No. 5, 7, and 10 were added. The individual films however are not divided, they play as one. This anthology was inducted into the National Film Registry in 2006.
- No. 1: A Strange Dream (1939-47 or 1946-48) hand-painted 35 mm stock photographed in 16 mm, color, silent, 2:20 or 5 min. Initially intended to be screened with and synchronized to Dizzy Gillespie's "Manteca" or "Guarachi Guaro". "... the history of the geologic period reduced to orgasm length."
- No. 2: Message From the Sun (1940-42 or 1946-48) hand-painted 35 mm stock photographed in 16 mm, color, 2:15 or 10 min. Initially intended to be screened with and synchronized to Dizzy Gillespie's "Algo Bueno" (also known as "Woody 'n' You"). This film "takes place either inside the sun or in ... Switzerland" according to Smith. To produce this film he used a technique that involved cutting stickers of the type used to reinforce the holes in 3-ring binder paper. These were applied to 16 mm movie film and used like a stencil. Layers of vaseline and paint were used to color each frame in this manner. The effect is hypnotic, psychedelic and is something like a visual music.
- No. 3: Interwoven (1942-47 or 1947-49) hand-painted 35 mm stock photographed in 16 mm, color, 3:20 or 10 min. Reportedly cut down from about 30 min. Initially intended to be screened with and synchronized to Dizzy Gillespie's "Guarachi Guaro" or "Manteca". "Batiked animation made of dead squares ..." (Available on the DVD collection Treasures IV: American Avant-Garde Film, 1947-1986 (2008).
- No. 4: Fast Track a.k.a. "Manteca" (1947 or 1949-50) 16 mm, black & white and color, 2:16 or 6 min. Silent though possibly intended to be screened with Dizzy Gillespie's Manteca. The film starts with a color sequence showing Smith's painting Manteca (ca. 1950) with which he tried to subjectively depict Gillespie's song, every brushstroke representing a music note. The film concludes with black & white superimpositions.
- No. 5: Circular Tensions (Homage to Oskar Fischinger) (1949–50) 16 mm, color, silent, 2:30 or 6 min. Sequel to No. 4.
- No. 6 (1948-51 or 1950-51) 16 mm, color, silent or mono, 1:30 or 20 min. Untraced red-green anaglyph 3-D film.
- No. 7: Color Study (1950-51-52) 16 mm, color, silent, 5:25 or 15 min. "Optically printed Pythagoreanism in four movements supported on squares, circles, grillwork, and triangles with an interlude concerning an experiment."
- No. 8 (1954 or 1957) 16 mm, black & white, silent, 5 min. Untraced collage. Later expanded to No. 12.
- No. 9 (1954 or 1957) 16 mm, color, 10 min. Untraced collage.
- No. 10: Mirror Animations (1956–57) 16 mm, color, 3:35 or 10 min. Study for No. 11. "An exposition of Buddhism and the Kaballah in the form of a collage. The final scene shows Agaric mushrooms growing on the moon while the Hero and Heroine row by on a cerebrum."
- No. 11: Mirror Animations (1956–57) 16 mm, color, 3:35 or 8 min. Features Thelonious Monk's "Misterioso". Cut-up and collage animation. Later expanded to No. 17.
- No. 12: Heaven and Earth Magic a.k.a. The Magic Feature a.k.a. Heaven and Earth Magic Feature (1943-58 or 1950-60 or 1950-61 or 1957-62 or 1959-61) (reedited several times between 1957–62) 16 mm, black & white, mono, initially 6 hours, later versions of 2 hours and 67 min. Extended version of No. 8. Collage animation culled from 19th century catalogs meant to be shown using custom-made projectors fit out with color filters (gels, wheels, etc.) and masking hand-painted glass slides to alter the projected image. Smith explains, "The first part depicts the heroine's toothache consequent to the loss of a very valuable watermelon, her dentistry and transportation to heaven. Next follows an elaborate exposition of the heavenly land, in terms of Israel and Montreal. The second part depicts the return to Earth from being eaten by Max Müller on the day Edward VII dedicated the Great Sewer of London." Jonas Mekas gave the film—which is often regarded as Smith's major work—its title in 1964/65.
- No. 13: Oz a.k.a. The Magic Mushroom People of Oz (1962) 35 mm widescreen (scope), color, stereo, 3 hours or 108 min. but only 20-30 min. are known to survive. Unfinished commercial adaptation of L. Frank Baum's The Wonderful Wizard of Oz which was shelved after Smith's close friend, the executive producer and primary financial backer Arthur Young died of cancer. Portions released as No. 16, 19, and 20. From the reported three to six hours of camera test footage (rushes) only ca. 15 minutes, in the form of non-color-corrected rushes, is known to be extant. The only completed part is The Approach to Emerald City, a 5 (other sources say 9 resp. 12) minute sequence set to music from Charles Gounod's Faust.
- No. 14: Late Superimpositions (1963-64-65) 16 mm, color, 29 min. Structured 122333221. Features the beginning of the opera Aufstieg und Fall der Stadt Mahagonny by Kurt Weill and Bertolt Brecht as recorded in 1956 by Lotte Lenya, the NDR Chor (Max Thurn) and the Norddeutsches Radio-Orchester (Wilhelm Brückner-Rüggeberg). Later expanded to No. 18. "I honor it the most of my films, otherwise a not very popular one before 1972." Shot in New York City and Anadarko.
- No. 15 (1965–1966) 16 mm, color, silent, 10 min. Animation of Seminole patchwork.
- No. 16: Oz - The Tin Woodman's Dream (1967) 35 mm widescreen (scope), color, silent, 14:30 min. Consists of The Approach to Emerald City (cf. note on No. 13) followed by about 10 minutes of kaleidoscopic footage shot ca. 1966. See also No. 20.
- No. 17: Mirror Animations (extended version) (1962-76 or 1979) 16 mm, color, 12 min. Features Thelonious Monk's "Misterioso". Extended version of No. 11 printed forward-backward-forward.
- No. 18: Mahagonny (1970-1980: shot 70-72, edited 72-80) 16 mm, color, tetraptych screen (initially with four 16 mm projectors, now composited onto a single 35 mm strip), 141 min. (edited down from over 11 hours of material). With Allen Ginsberg, Jonas Mekas, Patti Smith and images of Robert Mapplethorpe installations. "A mathematical analysis of Marcel Duchamp's The Large Glass, expressed in terms of Kurt Weill and Bertolt Brecht's opera Rise and Fall of the City of Mahagonny" upon which it is loosely based. Smith divided the images into four groups (Portraits, Animations, Symbols and Nature) and, with the assistance of Khem Caigan, arranged them as a series of procedural permutations in relation to the opera: every reel contains twenty-four scenes forming the palindrome PASA-PASNA-PASAP-ANSAP-ASAP-N. Note that the entire series hinges on Nature. Extended version of No. 14 (it also uses the same 1956 German language recording) Smith considered this film to be the ground-breaking harbinger of his unfinished masterwork, which was to have been an explication of the Four Last Things.
- No. 19 (1980) 35 mm widescreen (scope), color, silent. Untraced excerpts from No. 13. See also No. 20.
- No. 20: Fragments of a Faith Forgotten (1981) 35 mm widescreen (scope), color, silent, 27 min. Consists of No. 16 and No. 19.

== Archive ==
In 2013, the Getty Research Institute announced its acquisition of the Harry Smith papers. This wide-ranging archive consists of writings on film projects and ethnography, documents and photographs related to Smith's early interest in Pacific Northwest Indians as well as a complete collection of his most significant films, audiotapes, and ephemera.

Smith's original film elements are archived and preserved at Anthology Film Archives in New York City.

Among the archive there is a collection of paper airplanes that Smith found in the streets of New York. Jason Fulford in The New Yorker described this collection as "one of the oddest":

The "samples", as Smith called the planes, are delightfully varied. The papers are intriguing—scraps and junk mail bear the fingerprints of history, in fonts, colors, and patterns. But what reportedly attracted Smith was the variety of constructions. A friend recalled him observing that there were trends in the designs, ways of folding that would become prevalent and then disappear, only to have a resurgence years later. An airplane could also be a manifestation of its creator's past—in addition to finding planes in the street, Smith would ask friends and visitors to show him how they used to make paper airplanes when they were children. Some of the planes are sharp and speedy-looking, while others spread out like tablecloths. There's a little yellow one that looks like a skittish moth. It's impossible not to look at some of the designs and think: the planes I made as a kid would fly better than that. Many of the airplanes have writing on them by Smith, noting the location where they were found.

In 2015, Anthology Film Archives published a book about the paper airplane collection called Paper Airplanes: The Collections of Harry Smith: Catalogue Raisonné, Volume I.

== Film and video appearances ==
- Igliori, Paola. American Magus: Harry Smith (2001–02). Video. Includes clips from Smith's films, drawings, paintings, rare archive footage and interviews with Allen Ginsberg, Gregory Corso, Lionel Ziprin, Robert Frank, Jonas Mekas, John Cohen, James Wasserman, M. Henry Jones, Percy Heath, Grateful Dead, Patti Smith, DJ Spooky, Khem Caigan, Harvey Bialy and Rosebud Feliu-Pettet.
- Mekas, Jonas. Birth of a Nation (1997) 16 mm, color, 85 min. Snippets of 160 underground film people (including Smith) recorded between 1955 and 1996.
- Lund, Simon (c. 2000, 2002). Restoring Harry Smith's Mahagonny a.k.a. Making of Mahagonny. Short documentary on the restoration of No. 18.
- Singh, Rani (2002). On Mahagonny. Video. Jonas Mekas and others discuss No. 18. Features conversation between Smith and critic P. Adams Sitney shot by André S. Labarthe in 1971.
- Singh, Rani (2006). The Old, Weird America: Harry Smith's Anthology of American Folk Music. Video with Beck, Nick Cave, Elvis Costello, Steve Earle, Allen Ginsberg, Philip Glass, Emmylou Harris, Percy Heath, David Johansen, Luis Kemnitzer, Greil Marcus, Bob Neuwirth, Beth Orton, Lou Reed, Hal Willner and others.
