= Jean Bell Thomas =

American photographer and folk festival promoter

- Born: Jeannette Bell; November 14, 1881; Ashland, Kentucky, U.S.
- Died: December 7, 1982 (aged 101); Greenup, Kentucky, U.S.
- Occupations: Photographer, folk festival promoter
- Spouse: Albert Thomas (m. 1913, divorced)

Jean Bell Thomas (November 14, 1881 – December 7, 1982) was an American photographer and folk festival promoter, who specialized in the music, crafts, and language patterns of the Appalachian region of the United States.

== Early life ==
She was born Jeannette Bell in 1881 to William George Bell and Catherine S. Bell, a retired engineer and a schoolteacher, respectively, in Ashland, Kentucky. She earned the nickname "Traipsin' Woman" when, as a teenager in the 1890s, she defied convention to attend business school, learn stenography, and become a court reporter, traveling by jolt wagon to courts in the mountains of eastern Kentucky. Her travels from county to county were said to involve "considerable spells of traipsin'". Her exposure to the musical traditions, dialect, folkways, and costumes of the mountain people she encountered in her native Eastern Kentucky, combined with her later work in "show business," led to her avocation as a popularizer of mountain music and as proprietress of the American Folk Song Festival, staged in and near Ashland, Kentucky, from 1930 to 1972. In 1900, she lived at home with her parents; her occupation was stenographer.

== Career ==
Using money saved from her court reporter wages, Bell moved to New York City, where she took writing classes and continued to work as a stenographer. She married accountant Albert Thomas in 1913 and moved to Logan, West Virginia, but was divorced within a year. She then held a variety of jobs, including work as a script girl for Cecil B. de Mille's film The Ten Commandments, as secretary to the owner of the Columbus Senators baseball team, and as press agent for Texas Guinan, an entertainer and owner of prohibition-era speakeasies.

During her years working in eastern Kentucky, and on subsequent visits, Thomas often carried her camera and photographed the musicians and other mountain people with whom she came in contact. She used her portable typewriter to document lyrics and tunes to ballads. In 1926, she met James William Day, a blind fiddler from Rowan County. Using the skills she had acquired as a press agent, she changed his name to Jilson Setters, secured recording contracts, and booked him (as the "Singin' Fiddler from Lost Hope Hollow") in theaters. As Jilson Setters, Day eventually played in London's Royal Albert Hall at the Festival of the English Folk Song and Dance Society, for Thomas subscribed to the belief, also held by many of her contemporaries, that in Appalachia, "the speech, song, and traditions of old England still survived" (Thomas 1940, pg. 88). Day (a.k.a. Setters) was the subject of Thomas' first book, Devil's Ditties, published in 1931; subsequent books included the semi-autobiographical The Traipsin' Woman (1933) and The Sun Shines Bright (1940).

== Beginning of the American Folk Song Festival ==
Inspired by a traditional mountain "Singin' Gatherin'" (wherein musicians got together to perform old songs) she had witnessed, Jean Thomas staged a small folk festival for a group of invited guests at her home in September 1930. Featured performers included Setters and Dorothy Gordon, a singer from New York. Thomas incorporated the American Folk Song Society the following year to plan for an annual festival near her hometown of Ashland, Kentucky. The second American Folk Song Festival was held in 1932 on Four Mile Fork of Garner, just off the Mayo Trail, and featured eighteen acts, all of whom had learned by oral tradition, per Thomas' stipulation. The stage included a rented log cabin, because "It was my purpose to recreate as accurately as possible the original scene of the Singin' Gatherin'. That had been presented in front of a windowless cabin. But this rented cabin did have a glass window in front; so I covered it with an American flag" (Thomas 1940, pg. 198).

With the exception of the years 1943–1947, the American Folk Song Festival was held annually until failing health forced Thomas to retire in 1972. From 1934 to 1949, thanks to a benefactor's gift of land and a windowless log cabin, the festival took place at a site eighteen miles south of Ashland. Beginning in 1950, the festival was held in Thomas' yard in Ashland, moving to a state park in Prestonsburg in 1964, and to the Carter Caves State Park in 1966. The festival followed an unwavering script for many years, intended to show "authentic sequences in America's musical history" (Thomas 1940, pg. 262). Volna Fraley or, later, his nephew, would signal the start of the performances by blowing a fox horn that had belonged to "Devil Anse" Hatfield (patriarch of the legendary feuding family of the Kentucky-West Virginia border). Next, a man, woman, and two children would arrive at the stage by covered wagon to be greeted by a woman dressed as a Cherokee Indian, as a representation of the Anglo-American settlement of the Appalachian Mountains. Traditions carried over from the British Isles would then be demonstrated by a dozen children performing an old English country dance accompanied by a piper. A woman in the role of "Narrator" (often played by Thomas herself), attended by "Ladies-in-Waiting" dressed in long black Elizabethan gowns, would read a historical prologue connecting Appalachian customs and music to Elizabethan England. The prologue would conclude with a description of the wedding of a young pioneer couple named Ephraim and Drusilla; the ensuing musical performances were set in the narrative context of their wedding reception, or "Infare".

Musicians would play traditional stringed instruments such as dulcimer, fiddle, guitar, banjo, and accordion, plus recorder and mouth harp. Homemade varieties, such as fiddles constructed out of corn stalks, and banjos made from gourds, appeared alongside later models. Nostalgic for the 19th century, Thomas costumed festival performers in homespun garments evoking that era: girls wore bonnets and calico dresses; women dressed in linsey-woolsey and wrapped shawls around their shoulders; and men and boys often wore overalls. Characters bore names of people she had met long before ("Emmaline," "Little Chad," and "Little Babe"), or were invented to sound folksy. Props such as hickory chairs and egg baskets, brooms, and drinking gourds were used in photographing performers.

== Last years ==
She donated manuscript materials and her photographs to the University of Louisville in 1968. The remainder of her papers came to University of Louisville's Dwight Anderson Music Library in 1990, and are described online. Jean Bell Thomas died in Greenup, Kentucky on December 7, 1982, aged 101 years old.
