= Yolyn, West Virginia =

- Unincorporated community
- Location within West Virginia Location within the United States
- Coordinates: 37°49′45″N 81°51′40″W
- Country: United States
- State: West Virginia
- County: Logan
- Elevation: 1,004 ft (306 m)
- Time zone: UTC-5 (Eastern (EST))
  - Summer (DST): UTC-4 (EDT)
- ZIP code: 25654
- Area codes: 304 & 681
- GNIS feature ID: 1556040

Yolyn is an unincorporated community in Logan County, West Virginia, United States. Yolyn is 7 miles (11 km) east-southeast of Logan. Yolyn had a post office, which closed on March 3, 2007.
