= Reverend A. W. Nix =

American preacher

Reverend A. W. Nix (November 30, 1880 – January 10, 1949) was an American preacher who recorded 54 sermons and gospel songs in the late 1920s and early 1930s. He is best remembered for his commercially successful sermon, "Black Diamond Express to Hell." Nix's recordings were reintroduced when he was credited as a major influence on Thomas A. Dorsey, the "father of gospel music." However, the minutes of the 1921 National Baptist Convention confirm that Nix's brother, William Nix, Jr., was actually the influence on Dorsey. Accordingly, nearly all of A.W.'s sermons have been reissued on Document Records and compilation albums.

== Biography ==
A.W. Nix was born Andrew William Nix in Harmony Hill, Rusk County, Texas, in 1880 to Ida Peterson and William A. Nix. He later moved to Longview in Gregg County, Texas. By 1906, he was licensed as a minister, beginning at Shiloh Baptist Church in Topeka, Kansas. He has been described as a plainspoken speaker, but one who demonstrated his knowledge of formal study by incorporating historical figures into his sermons, such as "The Matchless King." In the 1920s, Nix signed with Vocalion Records, as record companies discovered the market in the black community for recordings by preachers. In Nix's recording period, which was between 1927 and 1931, he completed 54 (three unissued) sermons that, for the most part, featured him as the lead vocalist. The only other preacher to surpass Nix's numbers during this time was Reverend J. M. Gates of Atlanta, Georgia, who recorded over 200 sermons.

Nix's recording techniques and sermon focal points closely resembled Gates' approach. In 1927, Gates recorded two sermons, "Hell Bound Express Train" and "Death's Black Train Is Coming", which are thought to influence Reverend Nix's best-known work, "Black Diamond Express to Hell". Six total recordings under the same title were recorded by Nix as a continuation of the previous, and, like Gates, he begins to include congregation members who have their own speaking roles. "Black Diamond Express to Hell" chronicles various stops made by a train with "sin the engineer, pleasure the headlight, and the Devil the conductor". In a more extensive description, writer Martha Simmons explains how "Nix names various stops that a train takes on its way to hell. Stops include Liars Avenue, Drunkardville, and Gambling Tower. Before each stop, Nix intones and thunders the phrase, 'Next station!'. At each stop, he gives the characteristics of the types of people likely to board the Black Diamond Express – gossipers, liars, gamblers, and more".

With the success of "Black Diamond Express to Hell", the Reverend established the precedent for the recorded sermon series, a method which became successful for several other preachers of the era. By 1940, Nix had disappeared from public attention and he died in 1949. Several compilation albums feature his sermons, with "Black Diamond Express to Hell" being found on The Gospel Book, Gospel: Negro Spirituals, Rough Trade Shops, and Goodbye, Babylon, among others. In the mid-1990s, Document Records released an album which focuses solely on the Reverend's work called Rev. A. W. Nix: Complete Recorded Works in Chronological Order (1927–1928).

The Reverend's homiletic preaching, expressive articulation, and soulful singing has continued to influence others of the practice. Thomas A. Dorsey credited Nix's brother, William, with singing "I Do, Don't You?" spurring his religious conversion at the National Baptist Convention in Chicago, in 1921. As Dorsey recalled: "my heart was inspired to become a great singer and worker in the Kingdom of the Lord -- and impress people just as the great singer [Nix] did that Sunday morning".

He later died in Philadelphia, Pennsylvania in 1949 of shock due to a jeujunal hemorrhage. He was married to Ida A. Nix at the time, whom he married in Chicago, Illinois, on August 29, 1923. He left behind his wife and at least five children.
