= Edward W. Clayborn =

American gospel and blues musician

- Also known as: The Guitar Evangelist
- Born: Edward William Clayborn; March 10, 1880; Richmond, Alabama, U.S.
- Died: January 1978 (aged 97) Pittsburgh, Pennsylvania, U.S.
- Genres: Blues; Gospel
- Occupations: Singer, musician, minister
- Instruments: Guitar; Vocals
- Labels: Vocalion

Reverend Edward W. Clayborn (March 10, 1880 – January 1978) was an American musician, known as the "Guitar Evangelist". He sang a form of blues gospel similar to Blind Willie Johnson. Clayborn recorded forty songs, for Vocalion Records between 1926 and 1930. In The Ganymede Takeover, the San Franciscan author Philip K. Dick, a record enthusiast, has a character state that "True Religion", sung by Clayborn was one of the first jazz recordings.

Clayborn was born in Richmond, Alabama. The year he was born is disputed, with March 10, 1880 being the birthdate given on his WWII draft registration card.

Clayborn's music often consisted of him singing with his guitar. He often played guitar with a slide, often tuning to "Spanish" tuning, also known as Open G tuning. His songs are noticeably similar in structure to each other, though given that most people then only bought one or two records of a given artist, this was not a problem. He became a minister at St.Luke's Baptist Church in Pittsburgh, Pennsylvania. He died in January 1978 in Pittsburgh.
