= Frog Went a-Courting =

Scots and English folk song

"Frog Went A-Courtin'"

Nursery rhyme
- Published: 1549
- Songwriter: unknown

"Frog Went a-Courtin'" (Roud No. 16), also known as "A Frog He Would A-Wooing Go", is an English-language folk song. Its first known appearance is in Wedderburn's Complaynt of Scotland (1549) under the name "The Frog cam to the Myl dur", though this is in Scots rather than English. There is a reference in the London Company of Stationers' Register of 1580 to "A Moste Strange Weddinge of the Frogge and the Mouse". There are many texts of the ballad; however the oldest known musical version is found in Thomas Ravenscroft's Melismata in 1611.

== Summary ==
The lyrics involve a frog courting a mouse (Missie Mouse). The mouse is willing to marry the frog, but she must ask permission of Uncle Rat. In other versions such as "King Kong Kitchie Kitchie Ki-Me-O" by Chubby Parker, the frog fights and kills Miss Mouse's other suitors (an owl, bat and bumblebee) after they interrupt his proposal. Uncle Rat's permission received, the two work out details of the wedding. Some versions end with a cat, snake or other creature devouring or chasing the couple and wedding guests. Sometimes the frog gets away, but is later swallowed by a duck. Usually, the final verse states that one or more items (e.g., "bread and cheese" or "Frog's bridle and saddle") "are on the shelf" and that if one wants to hear more verses, one must sing them oneself.

== Origin ==
Spaeth has a note claiming that the original referred to Francis, Duke of Anjou's wooing of Elizabeth I of England; however, that was in 1579 and the version in Scots had been published thirty years earlier. If the second known version (1611, in Melismata, also reprinted in Chappell) were the oldest, this might be possible — there are seeming political references to "Gib, our cat" and "Dick, our drake." But the Wedderburn text, which at least anticipates the song, predates the reign of Queen Elizabeth by nine years, and Queen Mary by four. If it refers to any queen at all, it would seemingly have to be Mary Stuart. Evelyn K. Wells, however, in the liner notes to the LP Brave Boys; New England traditions in folk music (New World Records 239, 1977), suggests that the original may have been satirically altered in 1580 when it was recorded in the register of the London Company of Stationers, as this would have been at the height of the unpopular courtship.

According to Albert Jack in his book Pop Goes the Weasel: The secret meanings of nursery rhymes the earliest known version of the song was published in 1549 as "The Frog Came to the Myl Dur" in Robert Wedderburn's Complaynt of Scotland. He states that in 1547 the Scottish Queen Consort, Mary of Guise, under attack from Henry VIII, sought to have her daughter Princess Mary (later Mary, Queen of Scots), "Miss Mouse", married to the three-year old French Prince Louis – the "frog" – and that the song resurfaced a few years later, with changes, when another French (frog) wooing caused concern – that of the Duke of Anjou and Queen Elizabeth I in 1579. Elizabeth even nicknamed Anjou, her favorite suitor, "the frog".

== Recordings ==
With over 170 collected verses, "Frog Went a-Courtin'" has been performed and reimagined by dozens of iconic musicians, including Ella Langley, Elvis Presley, Bruce Springsteen, Bob Dylan, Pete Seeger, Woody Guthrie, Mike Oldfield, Burl Ives, Tex Ritter, Doc Watson, Rob Cantor, Flat Duo Jets, Nick Cave and the Bad Seeds, Elizabeth Mitchell, The Wiggles, and Shug Fisher.
