= Frank Hutchison =

American singer

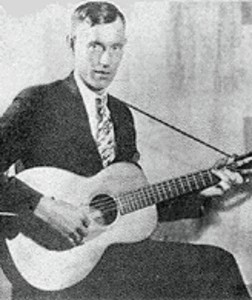
- Hutchison c. 1920s

Background information
- Born: March 20, 1897; Logan County, West Virginia, U.S.
- Died: November 9, 1945 (aged 48) Dayton, Ohio, U.S.
- Genres: Piedmont blues; country blues; old-timey
- Occupations: Musician; songwriter
- Instruments: Guitar; vocals; harmonica
- Years active: 1926–1929 (recording years)
- Label: Okeh

Frank Hutchison (March 20, 1897 – November 9, 1945) was an American early country blues and Piedmont blues musician and songwriter. Okeh Records promotional materials referred to him as “The Pride of West Virginia,” and he is thought to be the first non-African American musician to record in the country blues idiom. Hutchison was best known as a slide guitar player, where he held the guitar in his lap and used a pen knife as a slide.

== Biography ==
Born in Logan County, West Virginia, Hutchison worked as a coal miner at various mines in Logan County, both before and after his career as a recording artist. His exposure to Appalachian music came at an early age because his grandfather played fiddle and banjo in Logan before he died in 1903 in a mining accident. In 1904, the railroad first came to Logan County and exposed Hutchison to African-American blues and pre-blues. Hutchison is said to have walked with a limp, possibly as a result of a mining accident.

Between 1926 and 1929, Hutchison recorded 41 sides for Okeh, of which nine were unissued. Three of the issued sides and three of the unissued were recorded with Sherman Lawson, a Logan County fiddler; others featured Hutchison's guitar, harmonica, and voice. Hutchison also performed in the "Okeh Medicine Show," released by Okeh in 1929.

Some years after his recording career had ended and after he left the Logan County coal mines, Hutchison and his wife operated a store in Lake, West Virginia, where he also served as postmaster. His family lived above the store. The store burned down, Hutchison lost everything, and reportedly developed alcohol problems thereafter. He worked as a riverboat entertainer on the Ohio River and eventually moved to Columbus, Ohio.

He died in 1945 at a Dayton, Ohio hospital, of liver disease, aged 48. He is buried in a hillside family cemetery in Lake, West Virginia.

Hutchison is considered to be one of the finest performers of the "white country blues" genre of early folk music. One of his more famous recordings is "The Train That Carried My Girl From Town." His recording of "Stackalee" was included in Harry Smith's 1952 Anthology of American Folk Music and influenced a number of musicians during the 1950s and 1960s folk revival. Hutchison's songs have been covered by or have influenced Doc Watson, John Fahey, Bob Dylan, Mike Seeger, Roscoe Holcomb, Cowboy Copas, Frank Fairfield, Chris Smither, and Charlie Parr. He was inducted into the West Virginia Music Hall of Fame in 2018.

== Original discography ==
Matrix	Title	Record #	Recording date	Notes
80143	"Worried Blues"	Okeh 45064	September 28, 1926	
80144	"Train That Carried the Girl From Town"	Okeh 45064	September 28, 1926	
80350	"Stackalee"	Okeh 45106	January 28, 1927	
80351	"The Wild Horse"	Okeh 45093	January 28, 1927	
80352	"Long Way To Tipperary"	Okeh 45089	January 28, 1927	
80353	"The Gospel Ship"	Unissued	January 28, 1927	
80354	"The West Virginia Rag"	Okeh 45083	January 28, 1927	
80355	"C & O Excursion"	Okeh 45089	January 28, 1927	
80356	"Coney Isle"	Okeh 45083	January 28, 1927	
80357	"Old Rachel"	Okeh 45093	January 28, 1927	
80358	"Lightning Express"	Okeh 45144	January 28, 1927	
80359	"Stackalee"	Okeh 45106	January 28, 1927	
80776	"Old Rachel"	Unissued	April 28, 1927	
80777	"Lonesome Valley"	Unissued	April 28, 1927	
80778	"Logan County Blues"	Okeh 45121	April 28, 1927	
80782	"Worried Blues"	Okeh 45114	April 29, 1927	
80783	"The Train That Carried the Girl From Town"	Okeh 45114	April 29, 1927	
80784	"The Last Scene of the Titanic"	Okeh 45121	April 29, 1927	
80785	"All Night Long"	Okeh 45144	April 29, 1927	
80786	"Over the Waves"	Unissued	April 29, 1927	
401102	"Cluck Old Hen"	Unissued	September 10, 1928	& Sherman Lawson
401103	"Old Corn Liquor"	Unissued	September 10, 1928	& Sherman Lawson
401104	"Sally Gooden"	Unissued	September 10, 1928	& Sherman Lawson
401105	"Alabama Girl, Ain't You Comin' Out Tonight"	Okeh 45313	September 10, 1928	& Sherman Lawson
401106	"Hell Bound Train"	Okeh 45452	September 10, 1928	& Sherman Lawson
401108	"Wild Hogs In the Red Brush"	Okeh 45274	September 10, 1928	& Sherman Lawson
401109	"Boston Burglar"	Unissued	September 10, 1928	
401110	"The Burglar Man"	Okeh 45313	September 11, 1928	
401111	"Back In My Home Town"	Okeh 45258	September 11, 1928	
401112	"The Miner's Blues"	Okeh 45258	September 11, 1928	
401113	"Hutchison's Rag"	Okeh 45274	September 11, 1928	
402504	"The Boston Burglar"	Okeh 45425	July 9, 1929	
402505	"Down In the Lone Green Valley"	Unissued	July 9, 1929	
402506	"The Chevrolet Six"	Okeh 45378	July 9, 1929	
402507	"Cumberland Gap"	Okeh 45570	July 9, 1929	
402508	"The Deal"	Okeh 45570	July 9, 1929	
402509	"Railroad Bill"	Okeh 45425	July 9, 1929	
402510	"Johnny and Jane, Part 1"	Okeh 45361	July 9, 1929	
402511	"Johnny and Jane, Part 2"	Okeh 45361	July 9, 1929	
402512	"Cannon Ball Blues"	Okeh 45378	July 9, 1929	
402513	"K.C.Blues"	Okeh 45452	July 9, 1929	

== Bibliography ==
- Russell, Tony; Pinson, Bob (September 26, 2008). Country Music Records: A Discography, 1921-1942. Oxford University Press. ISBN 978-0195366211.
