= Reverend J. M. Gates =

American preacher and musical artist (1884–1945)

J. M. Gates

Background information
- Birth name: James M. Gates
- Born: July 14, 1884; Hogansville, Georgia, United States
- Died: August 18, 1945 (aged 61); Atlanta, Georgia, U.S.
- Genres: Gospel
- Occupations: Preacher; recording artist
- Instrument: Vocals
- Years active: 1926 - 1941
- Labels: Victor; Bluebird; Okeh; Paramount; Gennett

Reverend J.M. Gates (born James M. Gates July 14, 1884 – August 18, 1945) was an American preacher who recorded sermons and gospel songs extensively between the mid-1920s and 1940s. Recording over 200 sides in his career, Gates was one of the most prolific preachers of the pre-war era, and was largely responsible for the popularity in recorded sermons. Among the Reverend's most successful sermons, include "Death's Black Train Is Coming", "I'm Gonna Die with the Staff in My Hand"", and "Death Might Be Your Santa Claus".

== Biography ==
Gates was born in the rural community of Hogansville, Georgia, 50 miles southwest of Atlanta. In 1913, Gates and his wife Nellie relocated to a neighborhood in Atlanta, Summerhill, a popular location for the city's migrant workers and immigrants. He joined Mount Calvary Baptist Church and, when the preacher resigned to pastor another church in Detroit, Gates became ordained minister of the congregation in 1916. During his 26-year tenure, the Reverend Gates was highly celebrated for a preaching style rooted in black folk evangelicalism, effectively appealing to the church's migrant congregation.

The Reverend's reputation as a dynamic old-time preacher caught the attention of Polk Brockman, a talent scout who had already found success with Fiddlin' John Carson and Lucille Bogan. On April 24, 1926, under Brockman's supervision, Gates recorded five sermons for Columbia Records with the benefits of Western Electric's state-of-the-art electric recording system, and preaching in front of his participating congregation in Mount Calvary Baptist Church. The Reverend's first record, a cover of the 19th century folk composition "Death's Black Train Is Coming", was released in July to tremendous commercial success, selling over 35,000 copies by October. With "Death's Black Train Is Coming", Gates was the first individual to achieve widespread success with the recorded sermon, and set the precedent for others like Reverend A. W. Nix and Reverend J. C. Burnett. Gospel writer Lerone A. Martin noted that, unlike his predecessors, Gates' delivery of his sermons, which included antiphony, black vernacular, and emotion, especially appealed to urban African-Americans.

Gates' record sales rivaled and surpassed all of Columbia's established label artists, and black newspapers such as Atlanta Daily World declared "Death's Black Train Is Coming" made the Reverend's fame as a revitalist circulate across the country. Recognizing the potential for another hit, Columbia released the Reverend's second record, "I'm Gonna Die with the Staff in My Hand" in October 1926, which reached over 50,000 copies sold. The Reverend went on to record over 200 sermons, monologues, and songs from 1926 to 1941 for several record labels, including Victor, Bluebird, and Paramount. He was responsible for a quarter of the total amount of all recorded sermons released before 1943.

The Reverend is credited with introducing the gospel music of former blues artist Thomas A. Dorsey into the black gospel market via his crusades.

Gates died of a cerebral hemorrhage in August 1945. His funeral drew the largest crowd of any memorial service in Atlanta before Martin Luther King Jr.'s, in 1968. In addition to a Columbia Records collection and a "complete works" set from Document Records, Gates' work has been frequently featured in gospel and roots music anthologies, including Harry Everett Smith's influential Anthology of American Folk Music and the acclaimed American Epic: The Collection. "Are You Bound for Heaven or Hell" is featured on Bob Dylan's Theme Time Radio Hour, Episode 19.
