= Earl McDonald =

- Born: October 2, 1885; South Carolina, U.S.
- Died: April 28, 1949 (aged 63) Louisville, Kentucky, U.S.
- Occupation: Musician
- Instruments: Vocal; Jug

Earl McDonald (October 2, 1885 – April 28, 1949) was an American singer and jug player, noted as a pioneer in creating and recording jug band music. His musical contributions helped Louisville become a center for jug band music and cemented his legacy as "king of jug players".

== Personal life ==
He was born in South Carolina, but his family moved to Louisville, Kentucky, shortly thereafter. This move immediately placed him into the middle of an evolving music scene. These streets of Louisville helped his passion for music take off, as he did not grow up in a musical family or have private tutors. He made his instruments out of everyday items as his family did not have access to high quality acoustic instruments. He was the son of Mattie McDonald and the grandson of Agnes Reid, who both worked as servants for a white man named McDonald. Earl McDonald was the husband of Mary McDonald, whom he married in 1909. During World War II, McDonald worked under the Works Progress Administration (WPA) on road construction, while still playing music.

== Career ==
Earl McDonald took an interest in jug bands at the age of 15 after hearing B.D. Tite playing the jug for Cy Anderson's jug band. Two years later, McDonald decided to start his first jug band in 1902 at only 17 years old. This group was known as the Louisville Jug Band. Their first performances featured ordinary audiences on the streets of Louisville, but they would later accept invitations to play at local gatherings of well-off politicians and other influential elites. The band was slowly cementing Louisville as the center of jug bands. Success at local performances gained them an invitation to play at Churchill Downs for the 1903 Kentucky Derby. This performance gained the attention of numerous record labels and gave way for a number of opportunities in New York and Chicago.

The Louisville Jug Band was composed of a number of musicians who recorded for different labels under various names including the Dixieland Jug Blowers, the Old Southern Jug Band, Earl McDonald's Original Louisville Jug Band and the Louisville Stompers. One constant within these groups was fiddle player Clifford Hayes, a member of the Original Louisville Jug Band. By 1914, this group was performing across the country in New York and Chicago, but still spent the majority of their time in Louisville where they worked day jobs as their performance income was still not livable at this point in their careers. McDonald's band, the Louisville Jug Band, first gained national attention with their cameo appearance in a production of The Night Boat by the road company of Charles Dillingham. In the 1920s and early 1930s, he performed regularly with his band, the Ballard Chefs, on radio station WHAS, helping to popularize jug band music, and made over 40 recordings.

== Legacy ==
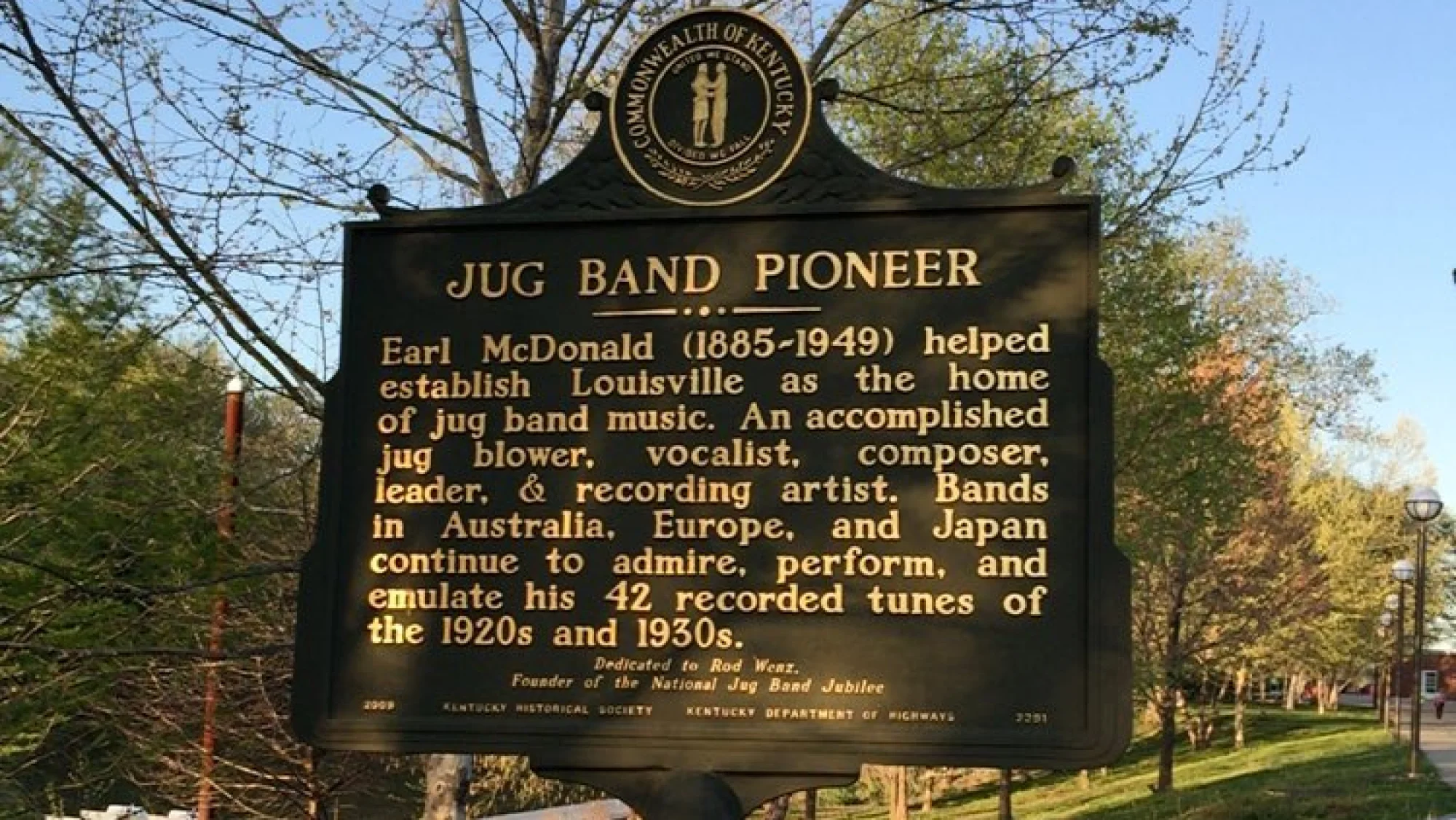
Earl McDonald historical marker, Waterfront Park, Louisville, Kentucky

McDonald's skill and role as a pioneer in jug band music earned him the title "king of jug players". His later life was marked by obscurity and hardship despite his successful career. Furthermore, he was never paid the same money as white artists of comparable success, and jug music fell into a steep decline in popularity after the 1930s. McDonald died in Louisville in 1949 and was buried in an unmarked grave. A gravestone was provided in 2009 at the instigation of supporters of the annual Jug Band Jubilee. McDonald has a historical marker dedicated to him at Waterfront Park in Louisville denoting his legacy.
