= Clifford Hayes (musician) =

American jazz musician

Clifford George Hayes (March 10, 1893 – October 22, 1941) was an African-American multi-instrumentalist and bandleader who recorded jug band music and jazz in the 1920s and 1930s, notably as the leader of the Dixieland Jug Blowers, Clifford's Louisville Jug Band, and Hayes's Louisville Stompers. His main instrument was the violin.

Hayes was born in Green County, Kentucky. He moved with his parents to Jeffersonville, Indiana, before 1910 and then relocated to Louisville. He played the fiddle, piano and saxophone and joined the Original Louisville Jug Band in 1913. In 1919, he left to form his own group, the Dixieland Jug Blowers. He made his first recordings in 1924, accompanying the singer Sara Martin as part of the Old Southern Jug Band, with jug virtuoso Earl McDonald. The following year, he recorded for Okeh Records as the leader of Clifford's Louisville Jug Band, and over the next few years recorded in Chicago with the clarinetist Johnny Dodds in the Dixieland Jug Blowers He also led Hayes's Louisville Stompers, who recorded between 1927 and 1929, with the pianist Earl Hines on some tracks. His last recordings were in 1931, when he recorded for Victor Records with Jimmie Rodgers, among others. Most or all of his recordings are prized by collectors all over the world.

Hayes died in Chicago in 1941.
