= Stovepipe No. 1 =

American songwriter

- Birth name: probably Samuel Chambers Jones
- Born: August 7, 1890; Paducah, Kentucky, U.S.
- Died: Unknown
- Genres: Country blues; Jug band
- Occupation: Musician
- Instruments: Guitar; Vocals; Harmonica; Stovepipe
- Years active: 1920s - 1960s

Stovepipe No. 1, (August 7, 1890 – unknown) born probably Samuel Chambers Jones was an American blues musician and songster, active in the Cincinnati area of the United States. He made his first recordings in 1924.

== Biography ==
Jones was born in Paducah, Kentucky on August 7, 1890. By the early 1910s, he had relocated to Cincinnati, Ohio, where he was known as a street singer and one-man band who played in many different styles and for black and white audiences. Jones became known for playing a stovepipe in the same manner as a jug, as well as wearing a stovepipe hat; contributing to his later nickname.

In 1924, Jones made his recording debut for Gennett Records. While playing in the streets of Cincinnati, Jones had adopted the nickname "Daddy Stovepipe", in reference to his stovepipe playing. Jones wished to be billed as "Daddy Stovepipe" on his records, however, Chicago based blues musician Johnny Watson had coincidentally recorded under that name six days prior. Jones then chose to adopt the name Stovepipe No. 1, perhaps as a way to brand himself as the 'original'. Jones also recorded under the name "Stovepipe Jones", "Stovepipe Jazz Band", and "Sam Jones". None of Jones' Gennett recordings were issued.

A few months later, Jones recorded for Columbia Records in New York City. He recorded 20 sides in these sessions, only six of which were issued, on both the Columbia and Harmony labels. The issued songs show a variety of music styles, from gospel to folk music.

Jones returned to the studio in 1927, being accompanied by blues guitarist and singer David Crockett. Crockett was a more sophisticated guitar player than Jones, who became a regular recording partner throughout the remainder of his recording career. In these sessions, they recorded six sides, four of them being issued by Okeh Records. This was Jones' last session where he was given leading credit.

Jones may have also recorded with Bob Coleman's Cincinnati Jug Band during the 1920s.

In 1930, Jones and Crockett, along with a group of unidentified musicians, entered the studio under the name "King David's Jug Band". The band recorded six sides for Okeh, all of which were issued. This was the last time Jones recorded.

It is not known when Jones died. He is remembered as being alive in the 1960s.

== Recordings ==
=== 1924 ===
Recorded May 16, 1924 in Richmond, Indiana for Gennett Records:

- "Six Street Blues" - Unissued
- "Them Pitiful Blues" - Unissued
- "Dixie Barn Dance" - Unissued
- "Spanish Rag" - Unissued
- "Hummin' Blues" - Unissued
- "In Dey Go" - Unissued

Recorded August 18, 1924 in New York City for Columbia Records:

- "Stovepipe Blues" - Unissued
- "Spanish Rag" - Unissued
- "Sixth Street Blues" - Unissued
- "Loveland Blues" - Unissued

Recorded August 19, 1924 in New York City for Columbia Records:

- "Lord Don't You Know I Don't Have No Friend Like You" - Columbia 210-D
- "When The Saints Go Marching Through" - Unissued
- "I've Got Salvation In My Heart" - Columbia 210-D
- "Soon One Morning Death Came Creeping In The Room" - Unissued
- "I'm Going To Wait On The Lord" - Unissued
- "Bye And Bye When The Morning Came" - Unissued
- "Pitiful Blues" - Unissued
- "Sundown Blues" - Unissued
- "Dan Tucker" - Unissued

Recorded August 20, 1924 in New York City for Columbia Records:

- "John Henry" - Unissued
- "Lonesome John" - Columbia 15011-D
- "Cripple Creed and Sourwood Mountain" - Columbia 201-D
- "Turkey In The Straw" - Columbia 201-D
- "Arkansas Traveler" - Unissued
- "Fisher's Hornpipe" - Unissued
- "Fisher's Hornpipe" - Columbia 15011-D

=== 1927 ===
Recorded April 25, 1927 for Okeh Records:

- "Court Street Blues" - Okeh 8514
- "Sundown Blues" - Unissued

Recorded April 26, 1927 for Okeh Records:

- "Untitled Song" - unissued
- "A Woman Gets Tired Of The Same Man All The Time" - Okeh 8514
- "A Chicken Can Waltz The Gravy Around" - Okeh 8543
- "Bed Slats" - Okeh 8543

=== 1930 ===
With King David's Jug Band

Recorded December 11, 1930 for Okeh Records:

- "What's That Tastes Like Gravy" - Okeh 8913
- "Rising Sun Blues" - Okeh 8913
- "Sweet Potato Blues" - Okeh 8901
- "Tear It Down" - Okeh 8961
- "I Can Deal Worry" - Okeh 8901
- "Georgia Bo Bo" - Okeh 8961
