= Silver claret jug =

Wine container

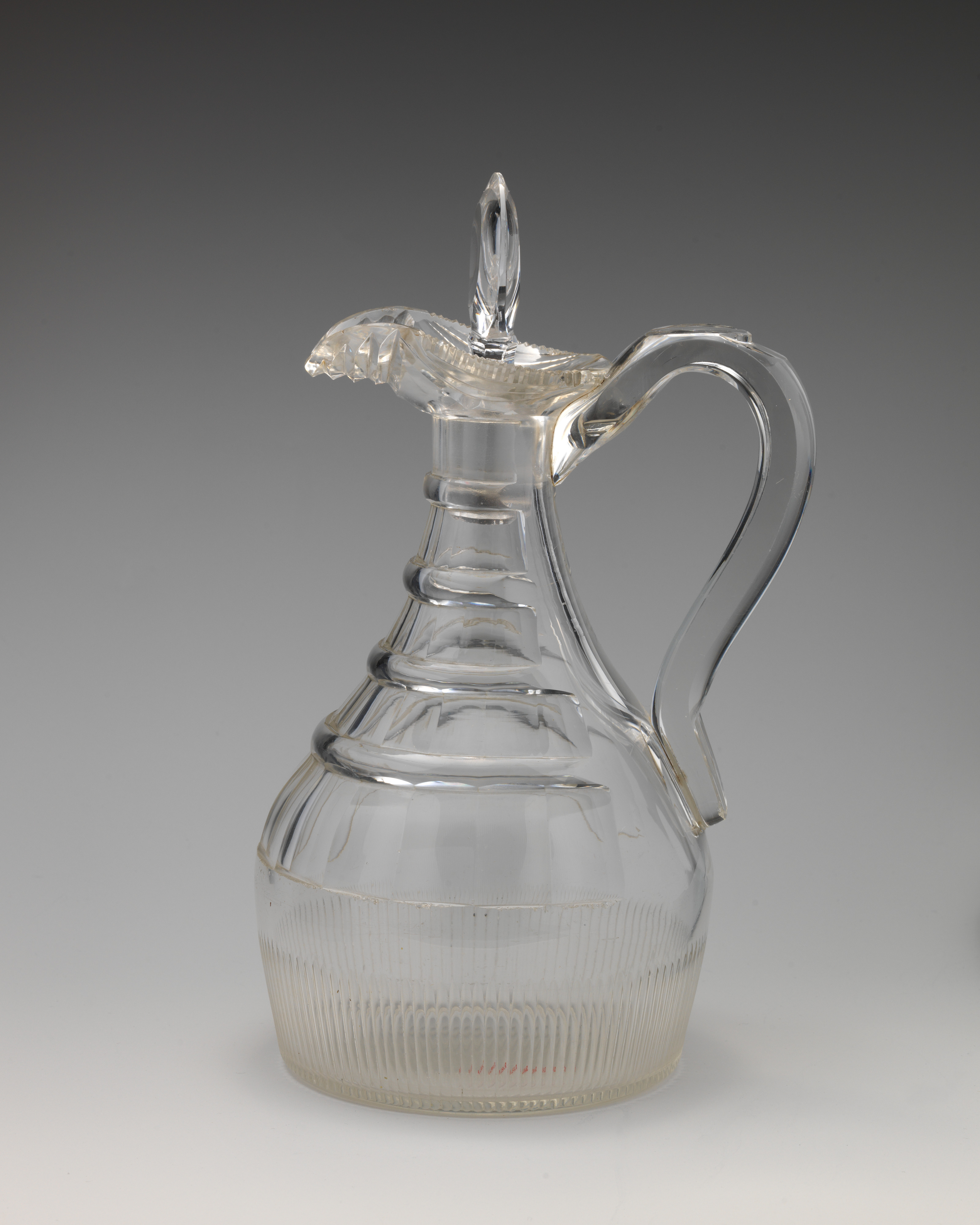
Claret jug circa 1820

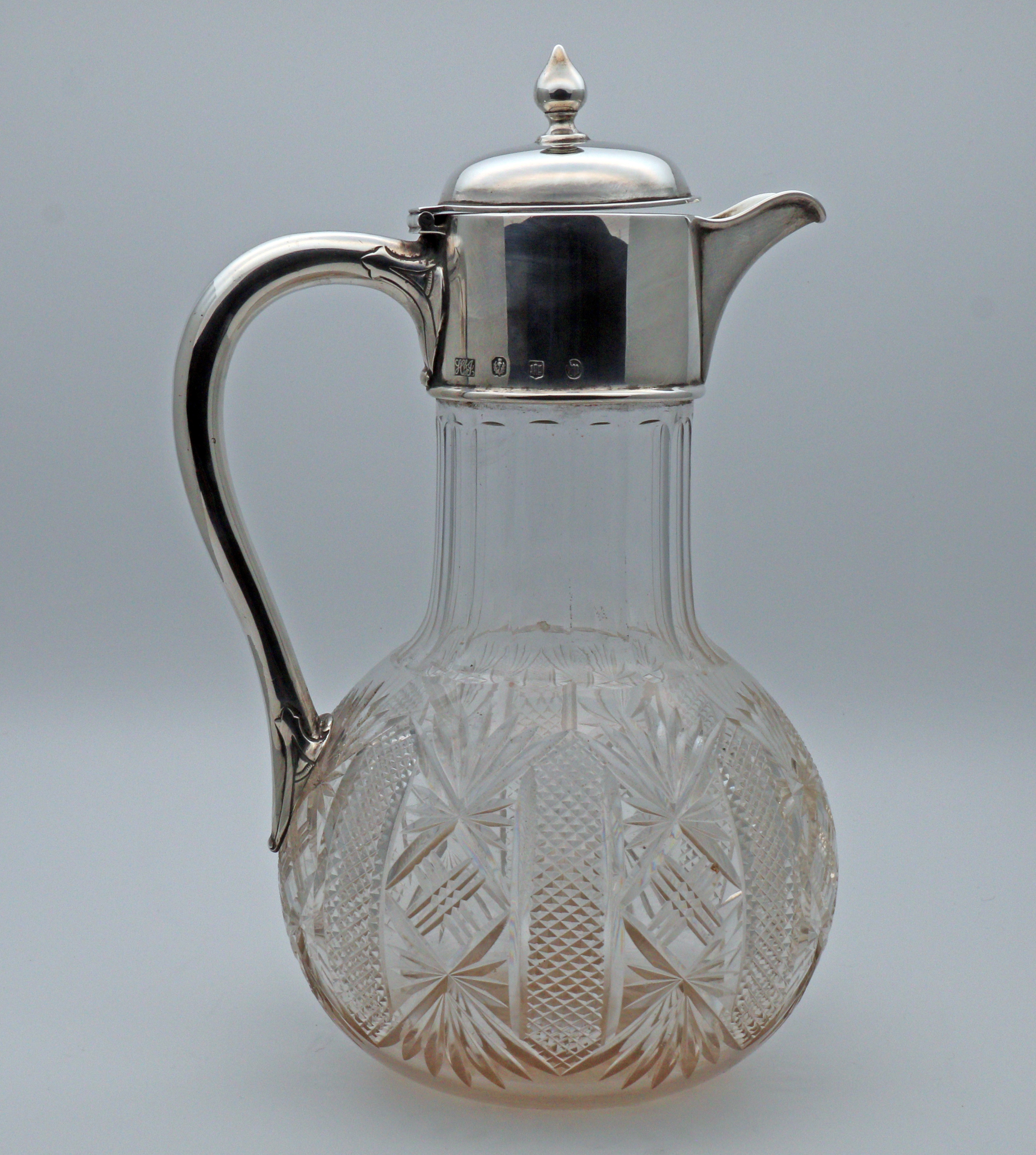
Hamilton and Inches claret jug, Edinburgh 1902

A silver claret jug is a wine jug made of silver, or glass with silver elements, for claret, which is the British name for French red Bordeaux wine, and other wines, especially reds.

Matured red wines, including claret, throw a deposit of sediment, and various methods and machines were designed to decant the wine into another container, leaving the sediment behind. Strong red wines also taste better after a certain period exposed to the air, which the decanting process and the jug shape achieved. From the introduction of claret to Britain in 1663 specific vessels soon began to be designed to contain the wine and let it "breathe" before consumption. Early examples of claret jugs are usually in green glass (as were the wine bottles themselves) with a pewter lid, usually raised by a simple finger pad.

From around 1740 to 1820 the fashion was to serve claret in either a fully glass or a solid silver jug, with the contents being fully hidden.

From about 1830 to 1920 the jugs became made of clear lead crystal glass capped with a lifting silver cover and usually also a silver handle. These are now very collectable. Most took advantage of the ease with which lead crystal can be cut. Less ornate versions were simply frosted. The silver mounted tops incorporated hinged lids, and handles that extended down halfway or to the base. The mounts were often engraved or chased, and the glass bodies were found in many different shapes and varying ornamentation. Some earlier examples were made entirely of silver. The level of craftsmanship and their aesthetic qualities determine their value. Unusual jugs, such as made by Charles Edwards or Christopher Dresser, or examples with fine engraved scenes may command high prices.

The popularity of wine fell after the First World War and did not recover until the 1970s. The re-emergence of wine had a product that was less reliant upon decanting (part of the purpose of the jug) and the fashion was then generally to serve wine straight from the bottle. The purpose of the claret jug is therefore largely gone.
