= Jug band =

Band employing a jug player

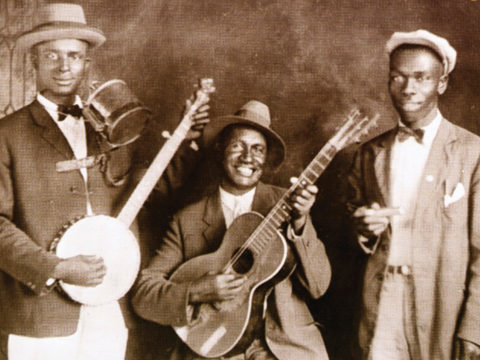
Cannon's Jug Stompers

A jug band is a band employing a jug player and a lineup of players of other instruments, both conventional and homemade. The homemade instruments are most often ordinary objects adapted to or modified for making sound, like the washtub bass, washboard, spoons, bones, stovepipe, jew's harp, and comb and tissue paper. The term 'jug band' is loosely used to mean any ensemble that incorporates homemade instruments, but those without a jug player are more accurately termed skiffle bands, spasm bands, or juke (or jook) bands (see juke joint).

== History ==
Early jug bands were typically made up of African-American vaudeville and medicine show musicians. Beginning in the urban South (namely, Louisville, Kentucky, and Memphis, Tennessee), they played a mixture of blues, ragtime, and jazz. The history of jug bands is related to the development of the blues. The informal and energetic music of the jug bands also contributed to the development of rock and roll.

The jug sound is made by taking a jug (usually made of glass or stoneware) and buzzing the lips into its mouth from about an inch away. As with brass instruments, changes in pitch are controlled by altering lip tension, and an accomplished jug player could have a two-octave range. The stovepipe (usually a section of tin pipe, three or four inches in diameter) is played in much the same manner, with the pipe rather than the jug serving as the resonating chamber. There is some similarity to the didgeridoo, but there is no contact between the stovepipe and the player's lips. Some jug and stovepipe players utilize throat vocalization along with lip buzzing, as with the didgeridoo.

The swooping sounds of the jug fill a musical role halfway between the trombone and sousaphone or tuba in Dixieland bands, playing mid- and lower-range harmonies in rhythm.

In the early days of jug band music, homemade guitars and mandolins were sometimes made from the necks of discarded manufactured guitars fastened to large gourds that were flattened on one side, with a sound-hole cut into the flat side, before drying. Banjos were sometimes made from a discarded guitar neck and a metal pie plate.

== Original bands ==
Jug bands from Louisville, Kentucky, were the first to record. The violinist Clifford Hayes's Old Southern Jug Band recorded as early as 1923. Whistler & His Jug Band, often making use of a nose whistle, first recorded in September 1924 for Gennett Records. Earl McDonald's Original Louisville Jug Band and Dixieland Jug Blowers were also among the first to record. The vaudeville-blues singer Sara Martin and "The Blue Yodeler", Jimmie Rodgers, both employed these bands for their recordings. Louisville bands often used whiskey jugs and were more jazz-oriented, a melding of string band and ragtime influences. Jug bands made street performances, played at parties, and began entertaining on riverboats on the Ohio River around 1900 and first appeared at the Kentucky Derby in 1903.

Jug bands from the Memphis area were more firmly rooted in country blues, hokum, and earlier African-American music traditions. Will Shade's Memphis Jug Band and Gus Cannon's Jug Stompers recorded for Ralph Peer, starting in 1927, many great songs that became the basis for the later jug band revival, including "Stealin'," "Jug Band Music," "On the Road Again," "Whoa, Mule," "Minglewood Blues," and "Walk Right In". Many songs had "blues" in the title, including "Coal Oil Blues" and "Lumpy Man Blues," but were not traditional 12-bar blues.

The Memphis Jug Band and Gus Cannon's Jug Stompers featured harmonica played by Will Shade and Noah Lewis, respectively. Other bands from the Memphis area were Jack Kelly and His South Memphis Jug Band, Jed Davenport and Dewey Corley's Beale Street Jug Band, and Noah Lewis's Jug Band. Ma Rainey's tub-jug band featured the first recordings of the slide guitarist Tampa Red, who later formed his own Hokum Jug Band. Big Bill Broonzy and Memphis Minnie cut a few sides each backed up by their own jug bands; Memphis Minnie also sang and played with the Memphis Jug Band. Memphis jug band music is closely associated with Memphis blues.

The Cincinnati Jug Band recorded for Paramount Records in 1929, with Stovepipe No. 1 on the stovepipe.

The Seven Gallon Jug Band, including Clarence Williams on jug and Willie "The Lion" Smith on piano, recorded for Columbia Records in 1929.

The Birmingham Jug Band, including Jaybird Coleman and Big Joe Williams, and King David's Jug Band recorded for Okeh Records in 1930 in Atlanta, Georgia.

Daddy Stovepipe and Mississippi Sarah recorded for Vocalion Records in 1931.

The 1930s depression and the devastating effect of radio on record sales reduced the output of jug band music to a trickle. The last sides by Cannon and the Memphis Jug Band were made in 1930 and 1934, respectively. Cannon and Will Shade were recorded again in 1956 by Sam Charters on a field trip for Folkways Records. The sound of the washboard and tub bass, however, lasted well into the 1940s as an integral part of the "Bluebird beat" in Chicago. Bukka White's "Fixin' to Die", recorded in Chicago in 1940, is driven by a syncopated washboard backup.

== Revival ==
One of the first recordings of the folk era jug band revival was by the Orange Blossom Jug Five, Skiffle in Stereo, made in 1958 for the poorly-distributed Lyrichord label. It was also the first recording by the New York folk singer Dave Van Ronk and featured Sam Charters, author of The Country Blues, his wife Ann, as well as Len Kunstadt, co-owner of the Spivey Records label. Van Ronk would revisit the genre in 1964 with the album Dave Van Ronk and the Ragtime Jug Stompers, though his ragtime guitar picking and repertoire influenced many subsequent jug bands. Another early recording group was Jolly Joe's Jug Band, led by the record collector Joe Bussard, and released on his own Fonotone label as 78 rpm records. Eventually these were collected on LP by Piedmont Records.

Gus Cannon's "Walk Right In" was a number 1 hit for the Rooftop Singers in 1963, the only time a jug band song topped the charts. These one-hit wonders even made an appearance at that year's Newport Folk Festival before fading into obscurity. The song's success brought Cannon himself back into the Stax Records studios in Memphis for his last recordings that same year at age 79. The album, Walk Right In, features Cannon on banjo and his old friends Will Shade on jug and Milton Roby on washboard. The album consists of 13 of his old hits, with Cannon interjecting comments and telling stories about the songs. Also in 1963, Starday Records released The Original Talking Blues Man, by Robert Lunn with Jug & Washboard Band.

This brief flurry of interest in the genre sparked the formation of a few jug bands that reached national prominence. The Jim Kweskin Jug Band of Cambridge, Massachusetts, which recorded for Vanguard Records, featured the washtub bass and jug player Fritz Richmond, who later played jug on Warren Zevon's "I'll Sleep When I'm Dead." The New York-based Even Dozen Jug Band was Elektra Records' answer to the Kweskin band and featured, among others, Maria D'Amato, Joshua Rifkin, David Grisman, Stefan Grossman, John Sebastian, and Steve Katz. Maria D'Amato then joined the Jim Kweskin Jug Band, later marrying the guitarist Geoff Muldaur. Artie Traum also formed a jug band at this time, called The True Endeavor Jug Band. The 13th Floor Elevators, a band from Austin, Texas, formed as an electric jug band, featuring Tommy Hall as electric jug player. A similar revival began in the UK in the 1960s, possibly as an offshoot of the revival in the United States. A number of jug bands appeared there in the late 1960s in addition to the skiffle bands, including the Anglo-American Filharmonious Jug Band.

The musicians playing in jug music revival groups went on to form other bands. John Sebastian founded the pop music group the Lovin' Spoonful and later continued as a successful solo artist. Country Joe and the Fish came from the Instant Action Jug Band. Mungo Jerry, which evolved from an earlier blues group, Good Earth, was in effect a jug band on their first live performances and recordings, thanks to their use of jug (played by the group's banjo player, Paul King, who left in 1972), and washboard, contributed by regular "extra member" Joe Rush. Jesse Colin Young moved to the West Coast and formed the Youngbloods, whose first hit was "Grizzly Bear," a jug band standard. Another group with jug band roots was the Grateful Dead. Jerry Garcia, Bob Weir, and Ron "Pigpen" McKernan were in Mother McCree's Uptown Jug Champions before forming the Warlocks, which evolved into the Grateful Dead. A self-titled CD of Mother McCree's jug band music recorded in 1964 was released in 1999. Maria Muldaur, Geoff Muldaur, David Grisman, and Stefan Grossman all continued with successful solo careers. The Nitty Gritty Dirt Band also started as a jug band.

Pop-rock tributes to jug band music include Willy and the Poor Boys, by Creedence Clearwater Revival, Jugband Blues, by Pink Floyd, and "Jug Band Music" by the Lovin' Spoonful. In addition to doing versions of songs from the jug band repertoire on their first album, Do You Believe in Magic (1965), such as "Blues in the Bottle," "Sportin' Life," "My Gal," "Fishin' Blues," and "Wild About My Lovin'," Sebastian's "Younger Girl" used the melody of Gus Cannon's "Prison Wall Blues."

The 1971 children's book Emmet Otter's Jug-Band Christmas by Lillian Hoban and Russell Hoban and its 1977 television film adaptation feature a jug band composed of woodland creatures. The film version features Muppets characters and a soundtrack composed by Paul Williams.

Jug bands have continued to exist and evolve to the present day. John Sebastian still leads the J-Band, which included not only musicians from the modern folk revival such as the late Fritz Richmond from the Kweskin band, but also the late Yank Rachell, mandolin player and jug band leader from the original era. Some bands remain faithful to the original roots, while others continually expand the jug band repertoire to include other folk music, popular music, jazz and classical music forms, such as The Juggernaut Jug Band of Louisville, Kentucky (formed in the late 1960s and possibly the only full-time jug band in existence at this time), The Cincinnati Dancing Pigs (who also have been together for 40 years), Carolina Chocolate Drops (an African-American jug band that also plays old-time string band tunes), the Hobo Gobbelins, the Kitchen Syncopators and the Inkwell Rhythm Makers. The Connecticut-based Jugadelics is an authentic jug band (i.e., employing a jug player) which continues the traditions of the genre as they employ both homemade and traditional instruments while relying on their own original material written by member Shishka Bob. In San Francisco, there's Devine's Jug Band, which is one of the few jug bands today that actually uses a jug blower full-time. And also in the Bay Area, the "Mother of Jug Band Music", Maria Muldaur has formed a new jug band, the Garden of Joy Jug Band, which include members of the Crow Quill Night Owls and the Gallus Brothers. A Canadian group, the Genuine Jug Band, from Vancouver, British Columbia, has most of its original members, who have played together since 1968. In Connecticut, Washboard Slim and the Blue Lights incorporate the blues with the usual ragtime repertoire, as well as original material. The Tennessee-based Jake Leg Stompers continue the traditional Memphis style. The South Austin Jug Band is a young group from Austin, Texas, which plays newer variations on traditional music but does not include a jug player and is not related to the earlier Austin Jug Band which featured vocalists Danny Barton and Galen Barber. The Philadelphia Jug Band has been playing authentic classic jug band music virtually unchanged for over 45 years. The Crow Quill Night Owls from Washington play a mix of 1920s blues, jazz and hillbilly music, which they learned from the 78-rpm records they collect.

A documentary by Todd Kwait about the history and influence of jug band music, Chasin' Gus' Ghost, first screened at the 2007 San Francisco Jug Band Festival. The film features numerous well-known musicians in interviews and performances, including John Sebastian, Jim Kweskin, Geoff Muldaur, David Grisman, Fritz Richmond, Maria Muldaur, and Bob Weir of the Grateful Dead, as well as Sankofa Strings, precursor band to The Carolina Chocolate Drops, and Taj Mahal as the voice of Gus Cannon. Many of these musicians performed at a sold-out concert at the San Francisco Jug Band Festival. Chasin' Gus' Ghost had its film festival premiere in October 2007 at the Woodstock Film Festival. Kwait produced Sankofa Strings' second album, The Uptown Strut, which featured John Sebastian as guest artist.

=== Festivals and competitions ===
The annual Battle of the Jug Bands in Minneapolis, Minnesota, has been held since 1980. Over 30 jugbands compete for the "Coveted Hollywood Waffle Iron" trophy, including the Jook Savages, a jugband that predates Kweskin's band and is still together. The competition is held the Sunday after the Super Bowl. The popularity of the event is such that even though it runs all day, there isn't time for all the bands to compete. In recent years a second competition, the Pancake League, has been added, taking place the day before.

The National Jug Band Jubilee was launched in Louisville, Kentucky, the probable birthplace of jug band music, in October 2004.

In California, an annual San Francisco Jug Band Festival has been held in San Francisco, California almost every August since 2006 and there is a JugFest gathering of jug bands each August in Sutter Creek, California since around 1998. Both of these free, outdoor, festivals feature a wide variety of jug bands in an all-day format that gives each band plenty of time to stretch out and play a full set. The 1st Annual West Coast Jug Band Jubilee took place in August 2010 in Berkeley, California.

The Chicago Battle of the Jug Bands has taken place each fall since 2007. Contestants compete for "Stuffy," a gilded sausage-stuffer. The Chicago battle was initiated by Arlo Leach, then a teacher at Chicago's Old Town School of Folk Music. Two years later, when he moved to Portland, Oregon, organizing the battle fell to Skip Landt, another Old Town School teacher. The Chicago competition, which takes place on a single evening, is judged by the audience, who "vote" for the winner on a replica of an official Chicago election ballot.

== Contemporary bands ==
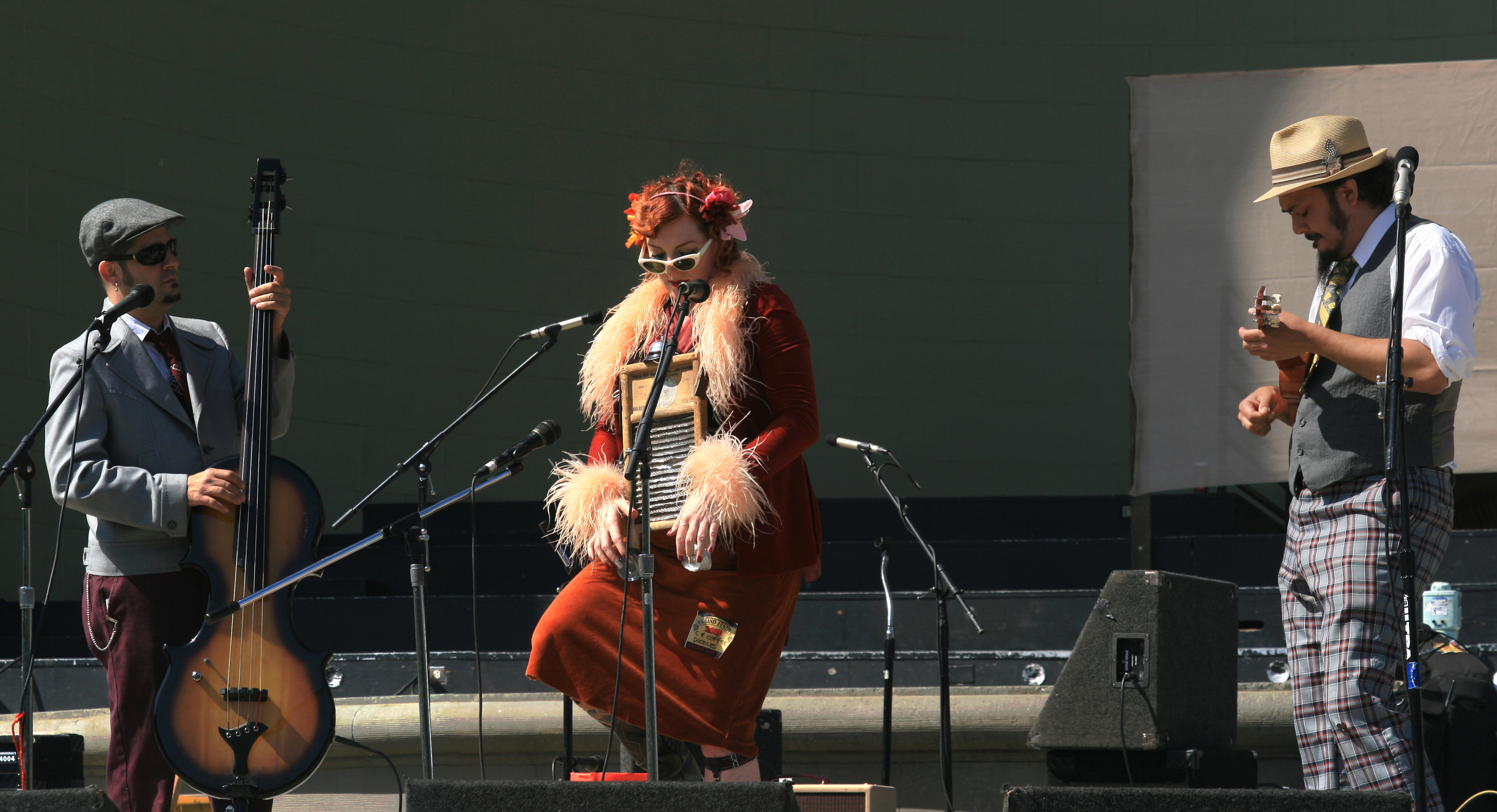
The jug band 5-Cent Coffee performing at the San Francisco Jug Band Festival

The 1990s and 2000s saw another generation of jug band revival, which might be termed postmodern jug band movement. These bands range from traditionalists (covering 1920s and 1930s jazz and blues) to modernists (creating new music from jug band instrumentation and aesthetics).

Scenes of this nature have developed in New York City (centering on the Lower East Side and Red Hook, Brooklyn), Minneapolis, Chicago, Southern California (primarily the Los Angeles area), in the San Francisco Bay area, the Pacific Northwest, and Taipei, Taiwan.

The Muddy Basin Ramblers, based in Taiwan, have composed over forty contemporary jug band songs across five albums since 2002. Three of their albums were nominated for the Grammy Awards for their unique and creative design.

The National Jug Band Jubilee in mid-September brings contemporary jug bands from as far as New England and the Northwest to Louisville, Kentucky.
