= Dixieland Jug Blowers =

The Dixieland Jug Blowers were a popular American musical group of the 1920s. The group was a jug band, incorporating the usual jug, banjo, guitar and fiddle, but it was also considered as a jazz band due to its use of alto saxophone, trombone, piano, and clarinet (played by Johnny Dodds). With this wide variety of instruments, the Dixieland Jug Blowers became the most sophisticated of its time, and influenced other jug bands of the time such as the Memphis Jug Band.

The Dixieland Jug Band was created by the commingling of two separate groups run by jug player Earl McDonald, and fiddler Clifford Hayes. They were brought together in 1926 for a Victor Records recording session in Chicago, Illinois, and again in 1927. McDonald had been a musician for almost 30 years, and favored the earlier traditional and minstrel tunes. Hayes, on the other hand, favored a more straight ahead jazz styled approach, eventually dispensing with the jug altogether.

== Legacy ==
The Dixieland Jug Blowers' recording of "Banjoreno" was used by animator Terry Gilliam in his "Brian Islam and Brucie" segment for the BBC comedy series Monty Python's Flying Circus. "Banjoreno" was also a favorite music cue of Jean Shepherd during his WOR radio shows.

"Banjoreno" was reissued in 2017 on the 5-CD compilation album American Epic: The Collection, on the Sony Legacy record label.
