= Jug =

Container used to hold liquid

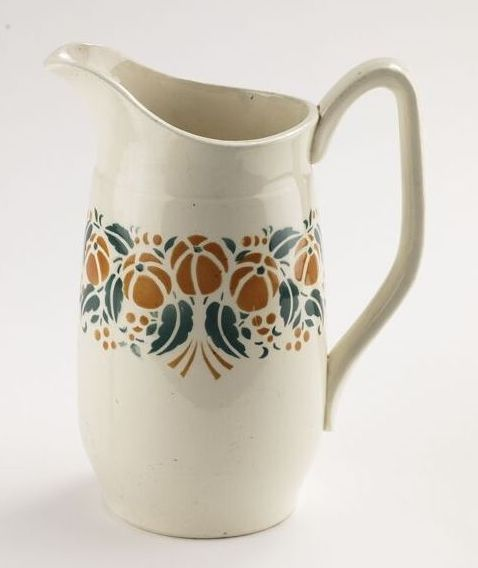
French ceramic jug

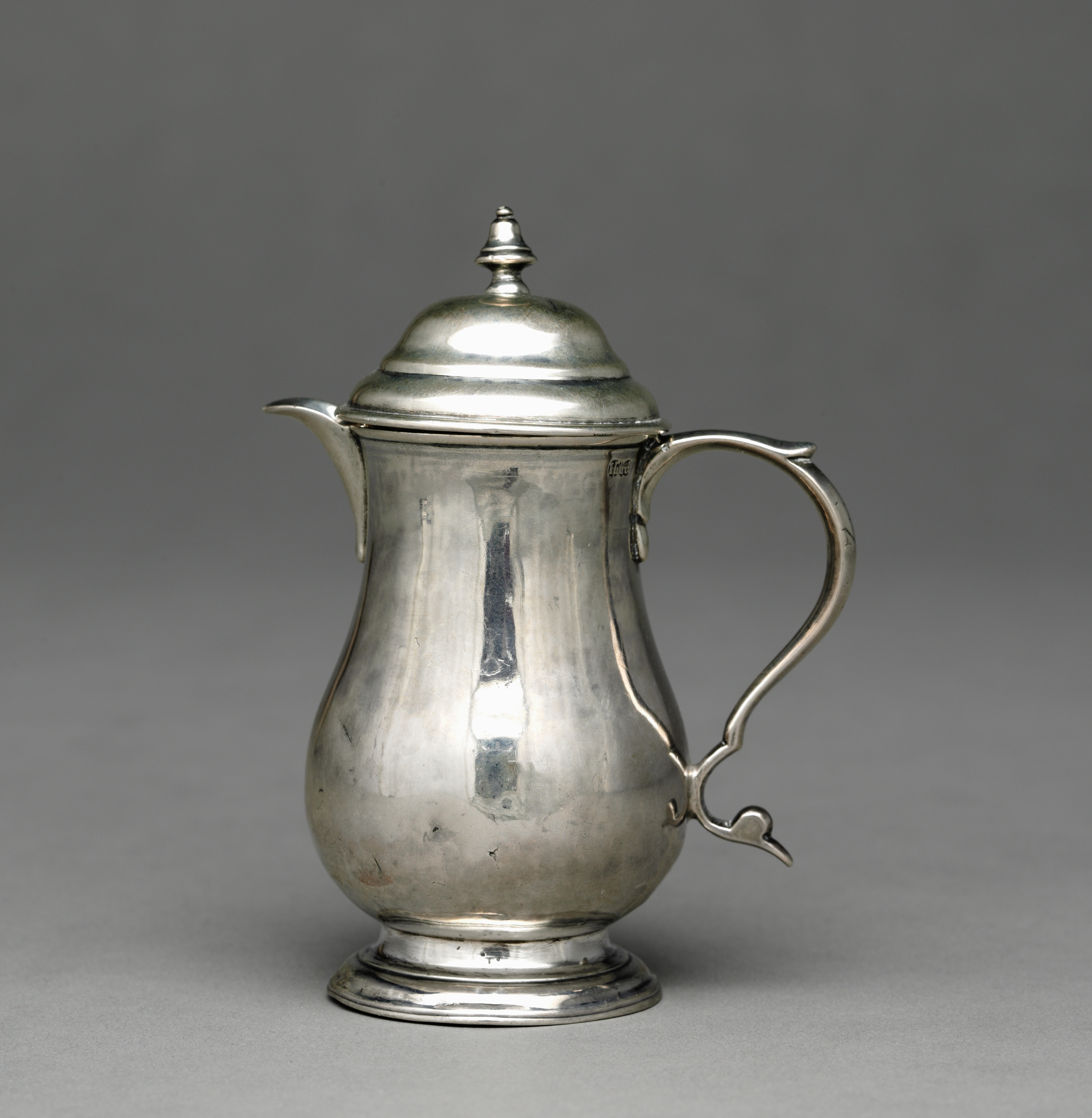
Covered cream jug, 1735, silver, Cleveland Museum of Art (US)

A jug is a type of container commonly used to hold and serve liquids, but not normally to drink from directly. It has an opening, sometimes narrow, from which to pour or drink, and has a handle, and usually a pouring lip. Jugs throughout history have been made of metal, ceramic, or glass, and plastic is now common.

In British English, jugs are pouring vessels for holding drinkable liquids, whether beer, water or soft drinks. In North American English these table jugs are usually called pitchers. Ewer is an older word for jugs or pitchers, and there are several others, such as flagon.

Several other types of containers are also called jugs, depending on locale, tradition, and personal preference. Some types of bottles can be called jugs, particularly if the container has a narrow mouth and has a handle. Closures such as stoppers or screw caps are common for these retail packages.

== Etymology ==
The word jug is first recorded in the late 15th century as jugge or jubbe. It is of unknown origin, but perhaps comes from jug a term for a maidservant, in the same period. This in turn comes from the alteration of common personal names such as Joan or Judith.

== Beer ==
In certain countries, especially New Zealand and Australia, a "jug" refers to a plastic container filled with two imperial pints (just over a litre) of beer. It is usually served along with one or more small glasses from which the beer is normally consumed, although in some student bars it is more common for the beer to be drunk directly from the jug, which is usually served without the accompanying glass. (In the U.S., this may be called a pitcher—although few US pitchers are as small as a litre, generally holding between 64 and 128 U.S. fluid ounces, approximately 2-4 litres. In New Zealand and Australia a pitcher sometimes can refer to a much larger measure of beer.)

In Britain in those parts of the country where there is a choice between a pint (20 fluid ounces) tankard and a straight glass of beer, a tankard may be called a tankard or a "jug". A jug of beer may also refer to a jug containing larger amounts (usually sized in pints), but if a large jug is sold it will be advertised as such in the pub and this helps to reduce confusion.

== Music ==
In American folk music, an empty jug (often stoneware used for American whiskey) is sometimes used as a musical instrument, being played with buzzed lips to produce a trombone-like tone. It is often part of a jug band, to which ensemble it lends its name.

== Examples ==
In addition to the typical definition, a variety of other containers designed for carrying liquid are sometimes called "jugs".

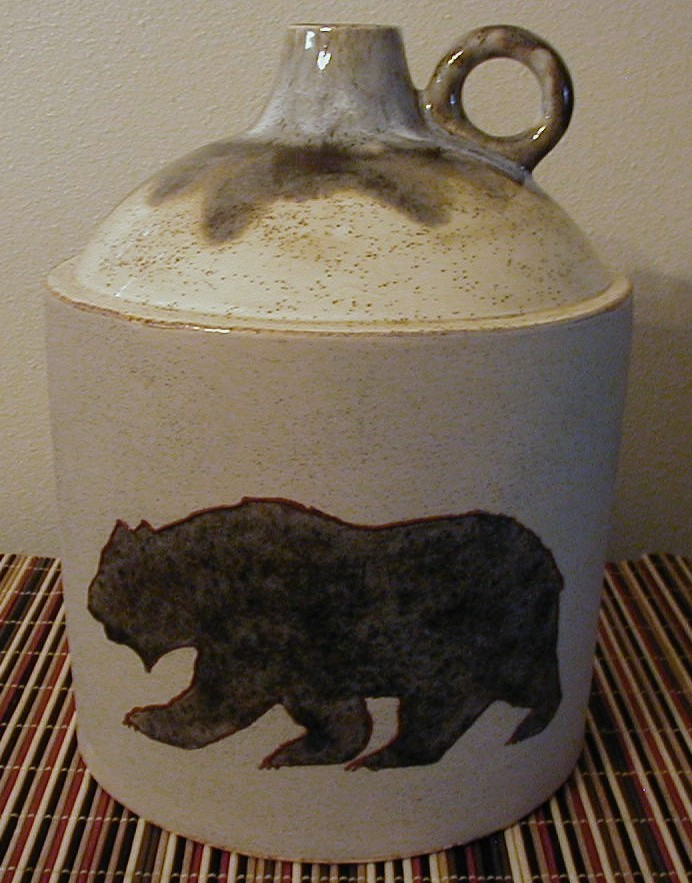
Stoneware whiskey jug

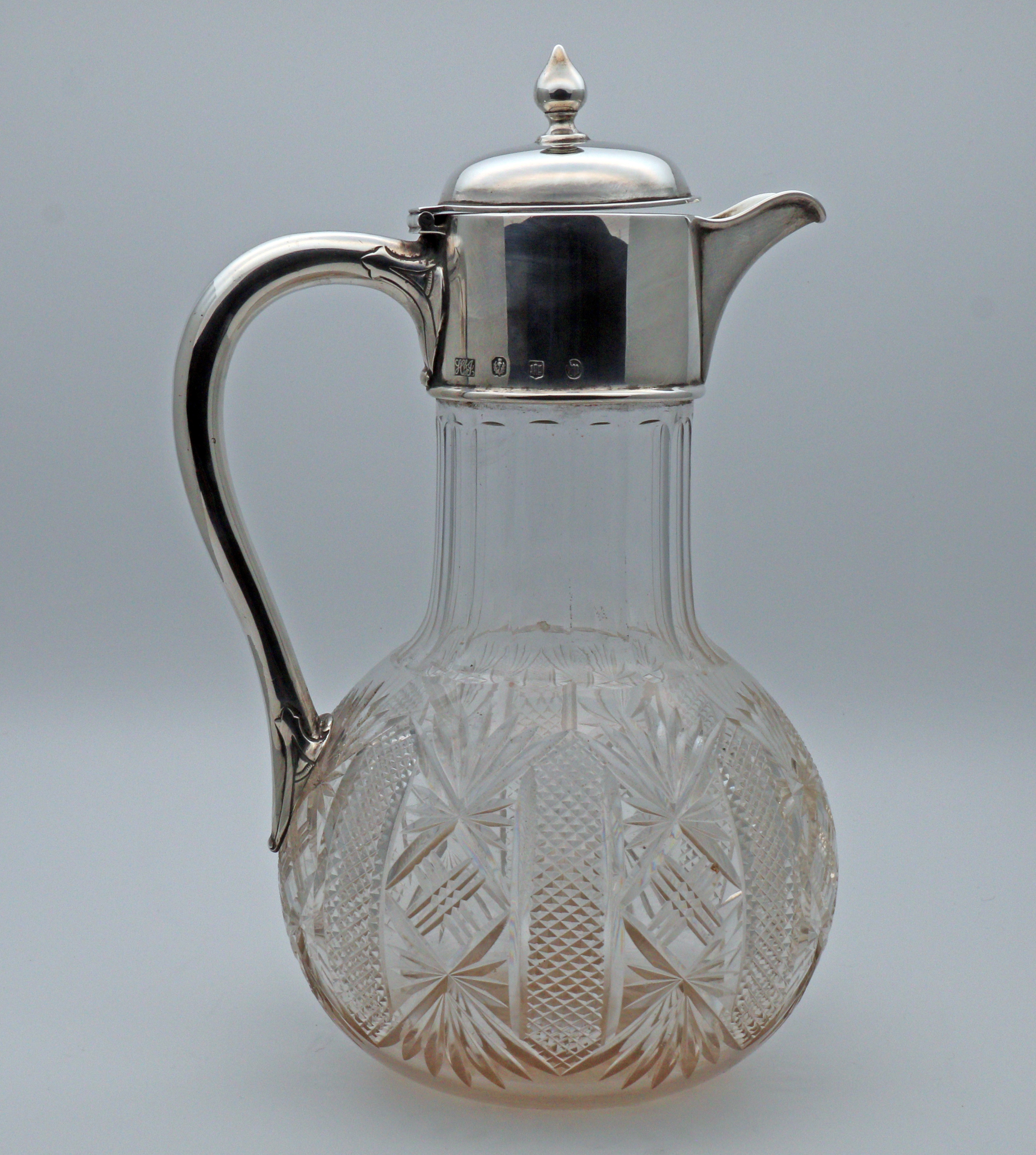
Hamilton and Inches silver claret jug, Edinburgh 1902

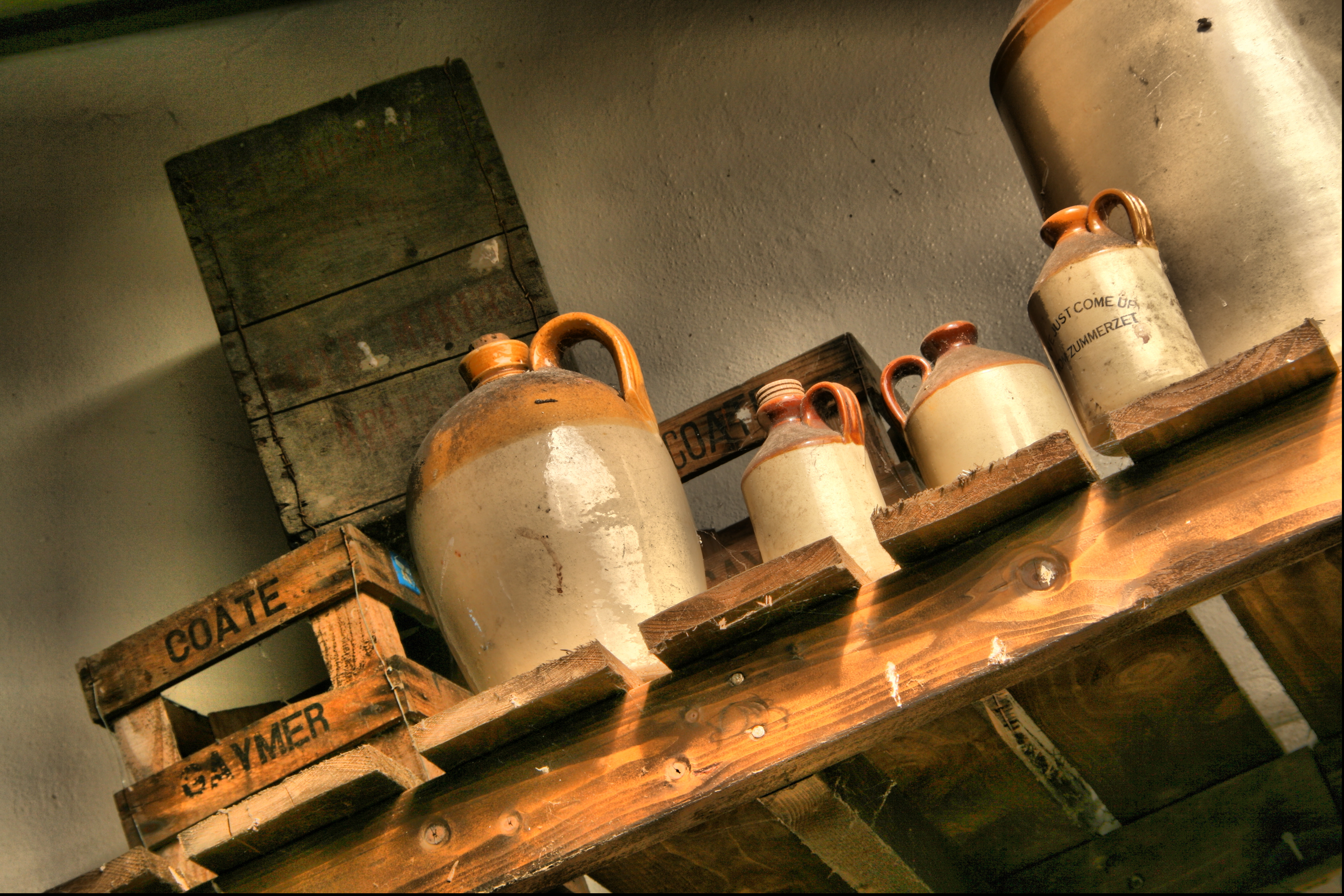
A set of earthenware jugs used for holding cider, manufactured in Somerset, England

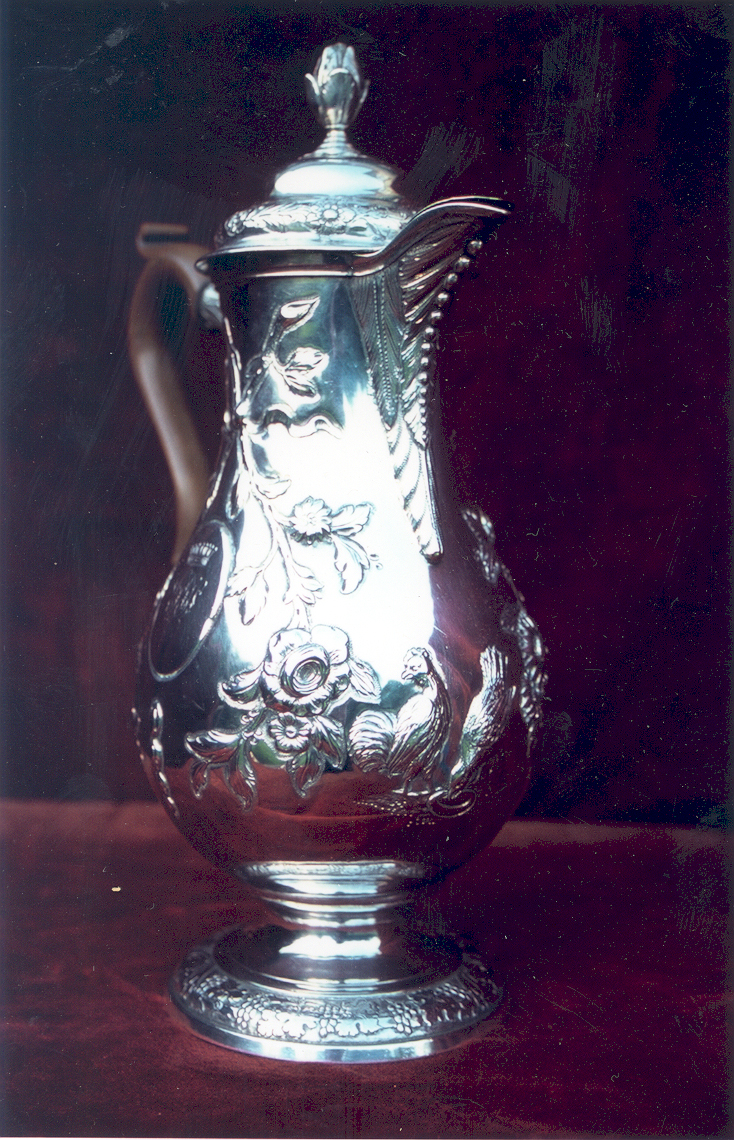
Silver hot water jug, Dublin c1770, using a coffee-pot shape with a higher base.

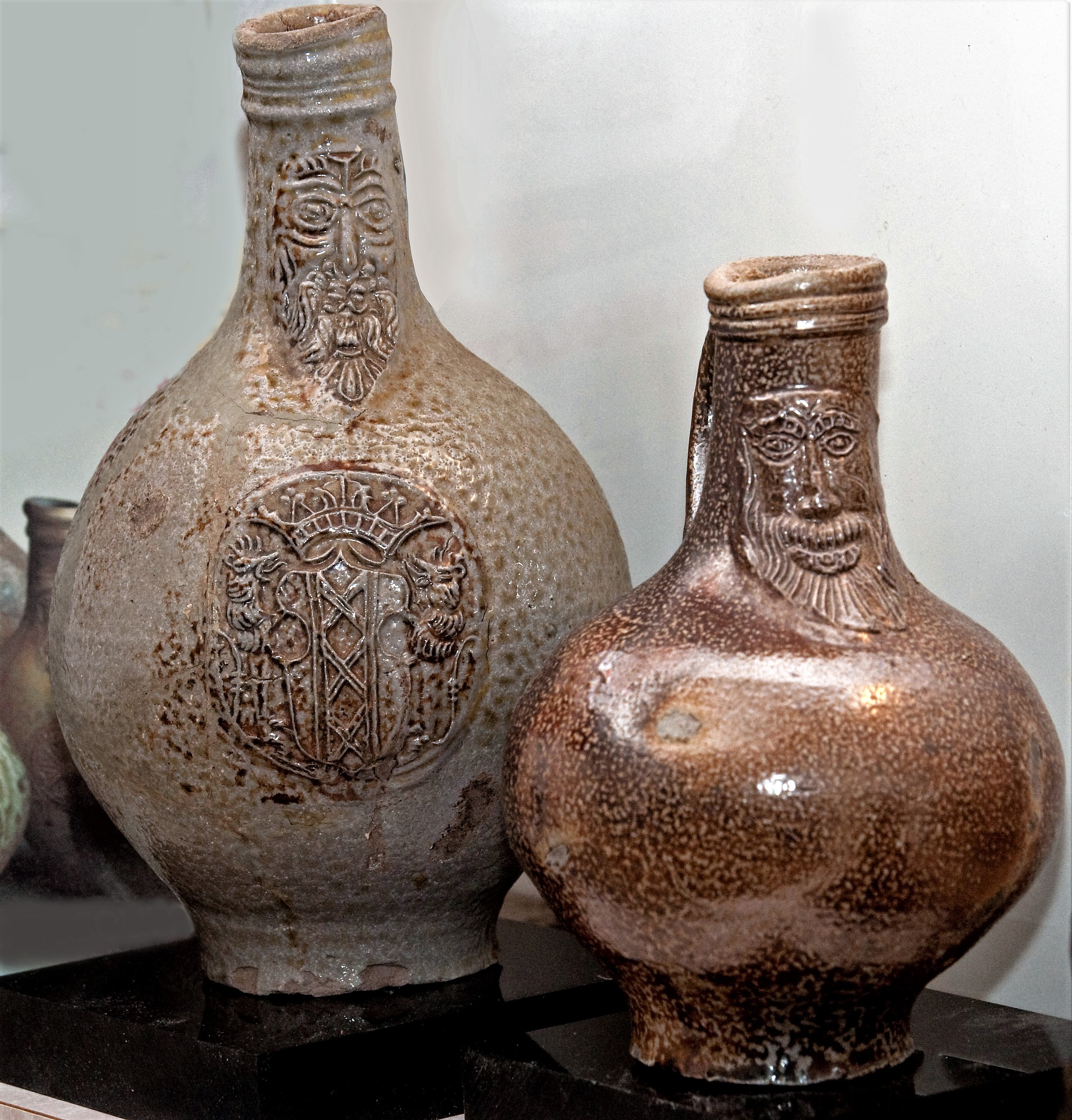
Two 17th-century German Bartmann jugs

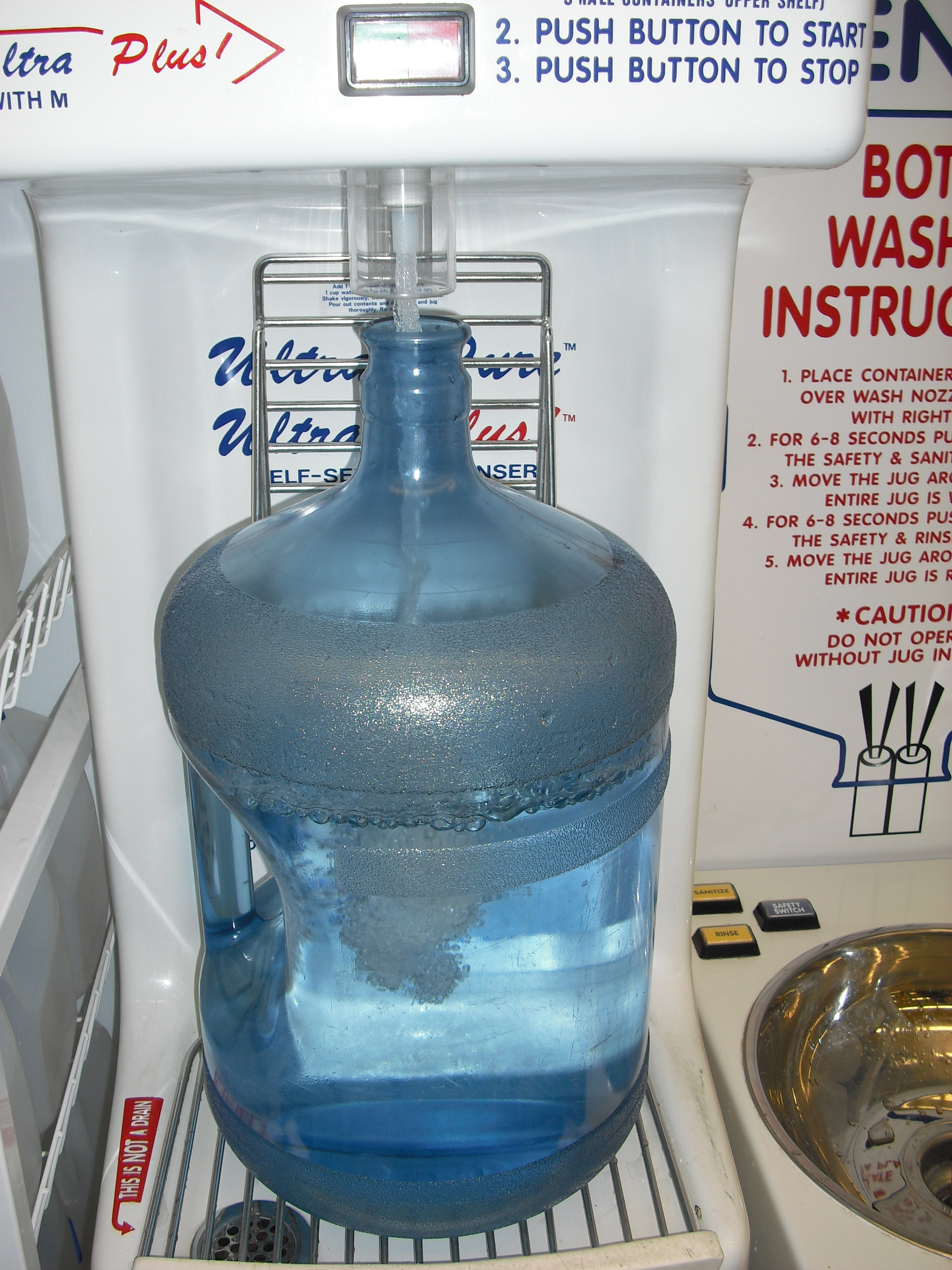
18 L refillable plastic water jug, typically used in water coolers

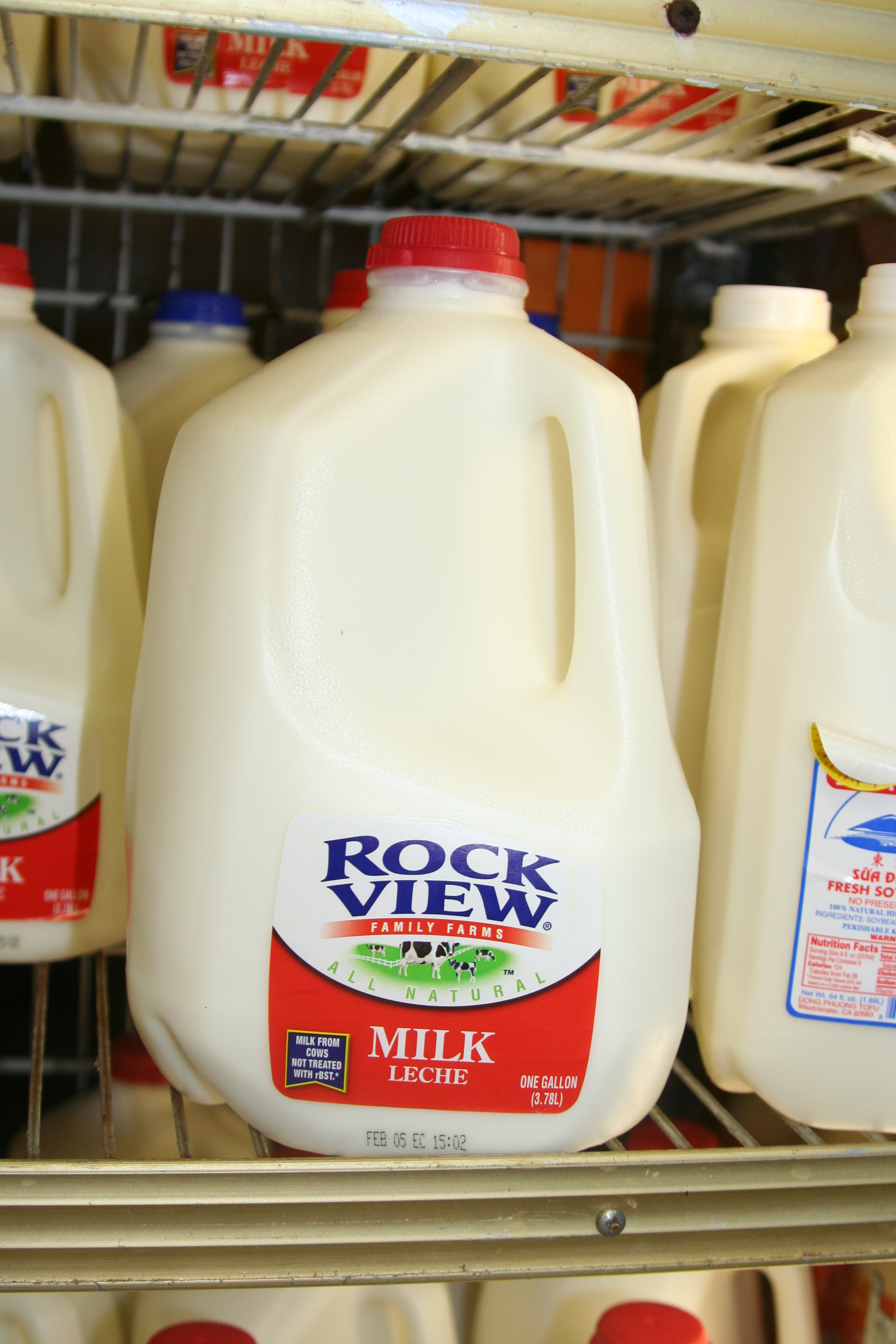
Blow molded plastic bottle of milk, often called a milk jug in America

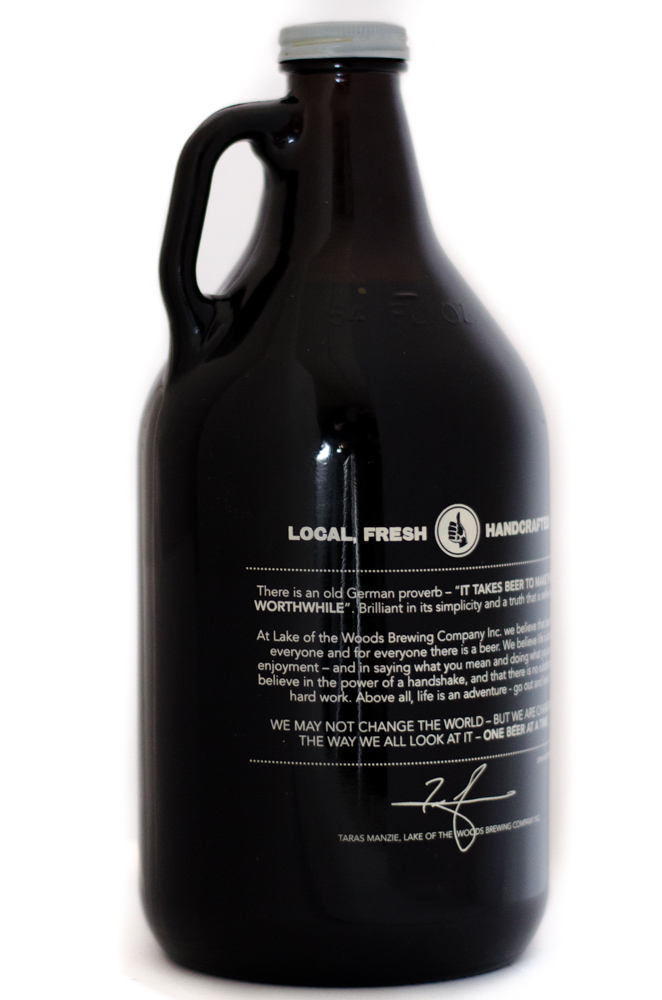
A growler beer bottle or “jug”

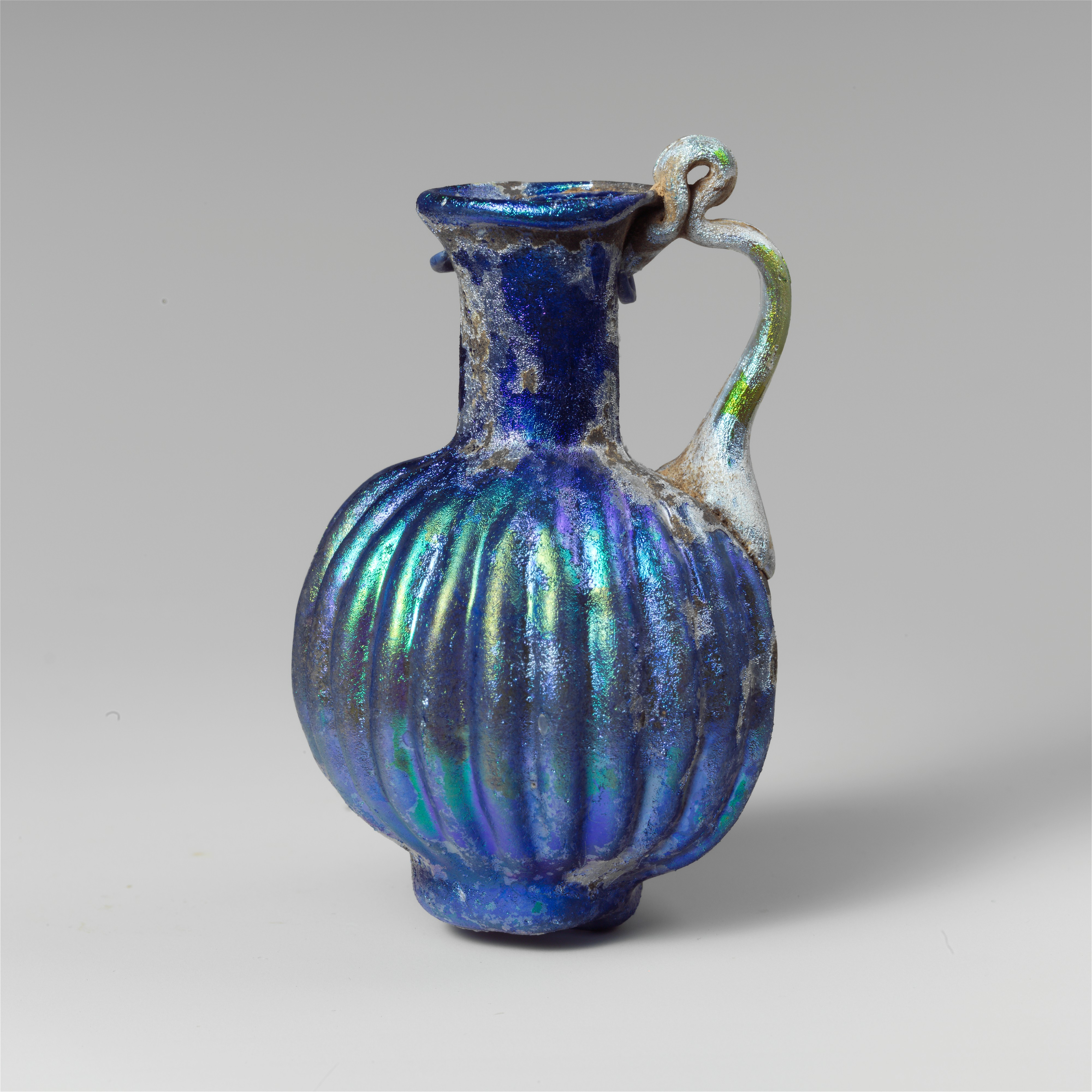
Roman glass juglet with vertical ribbing. 2nd half of 1st century C.E.

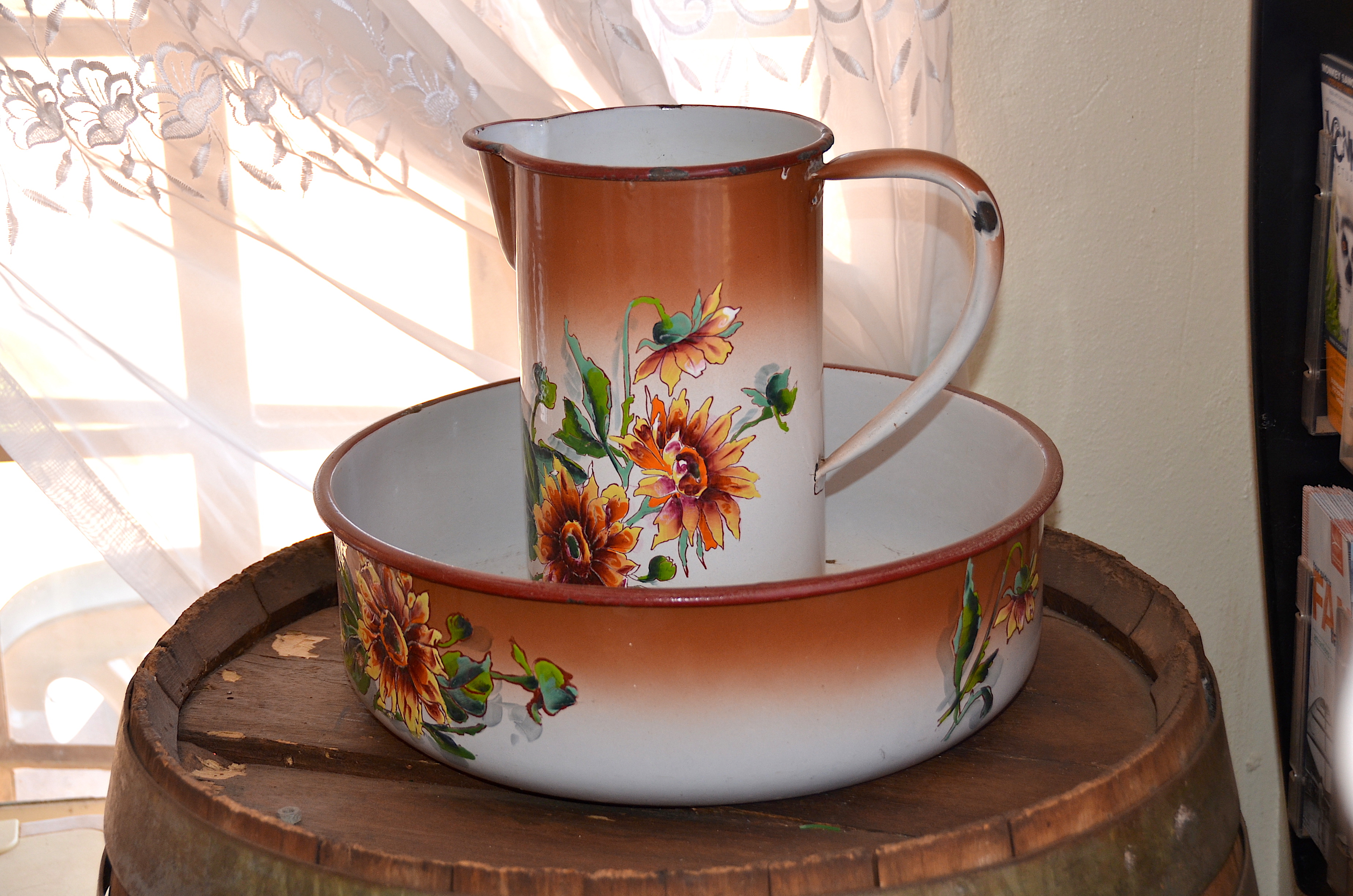
Enamel wash-basin and ewer

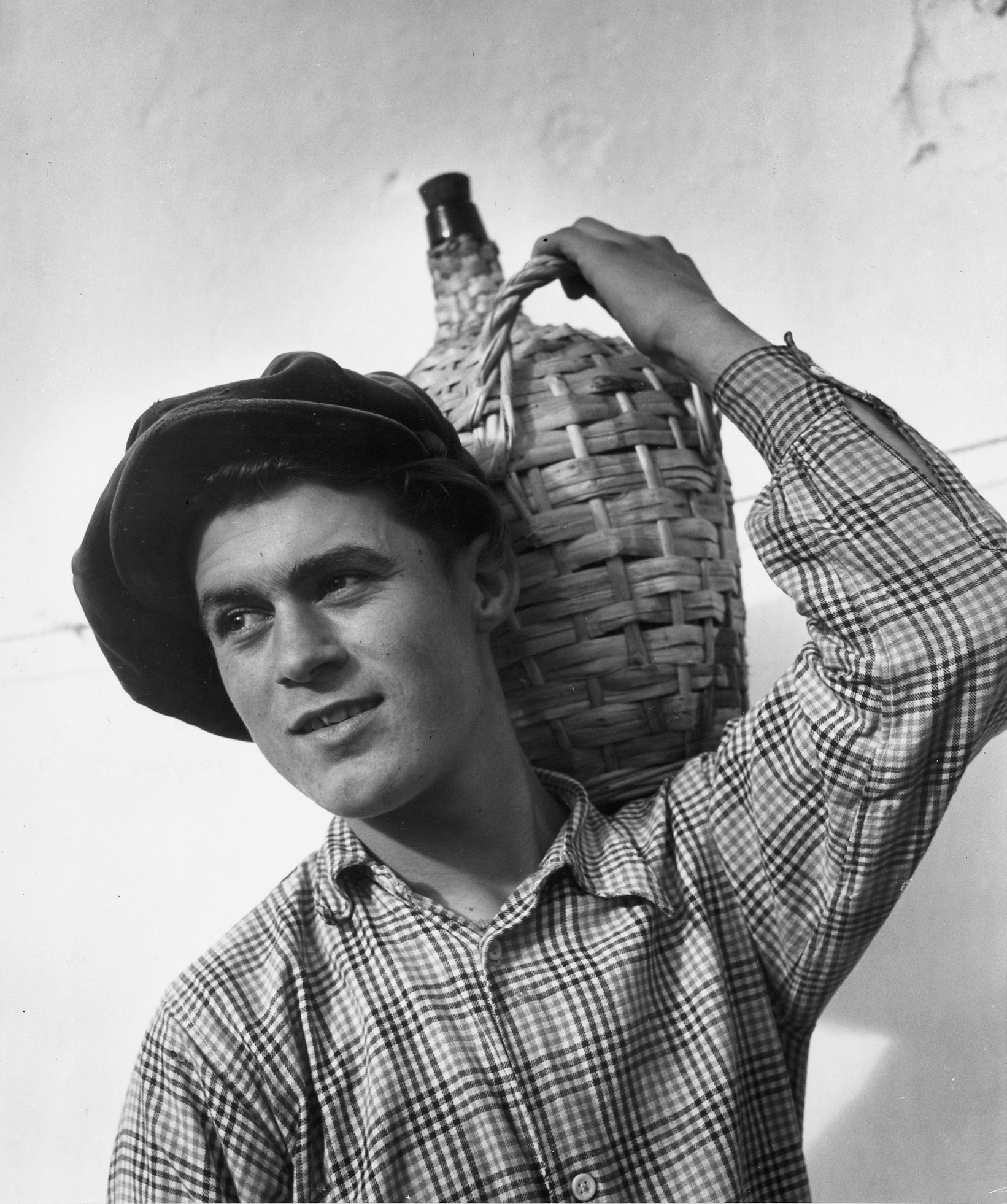
Man with a jug, Portugal, 1950

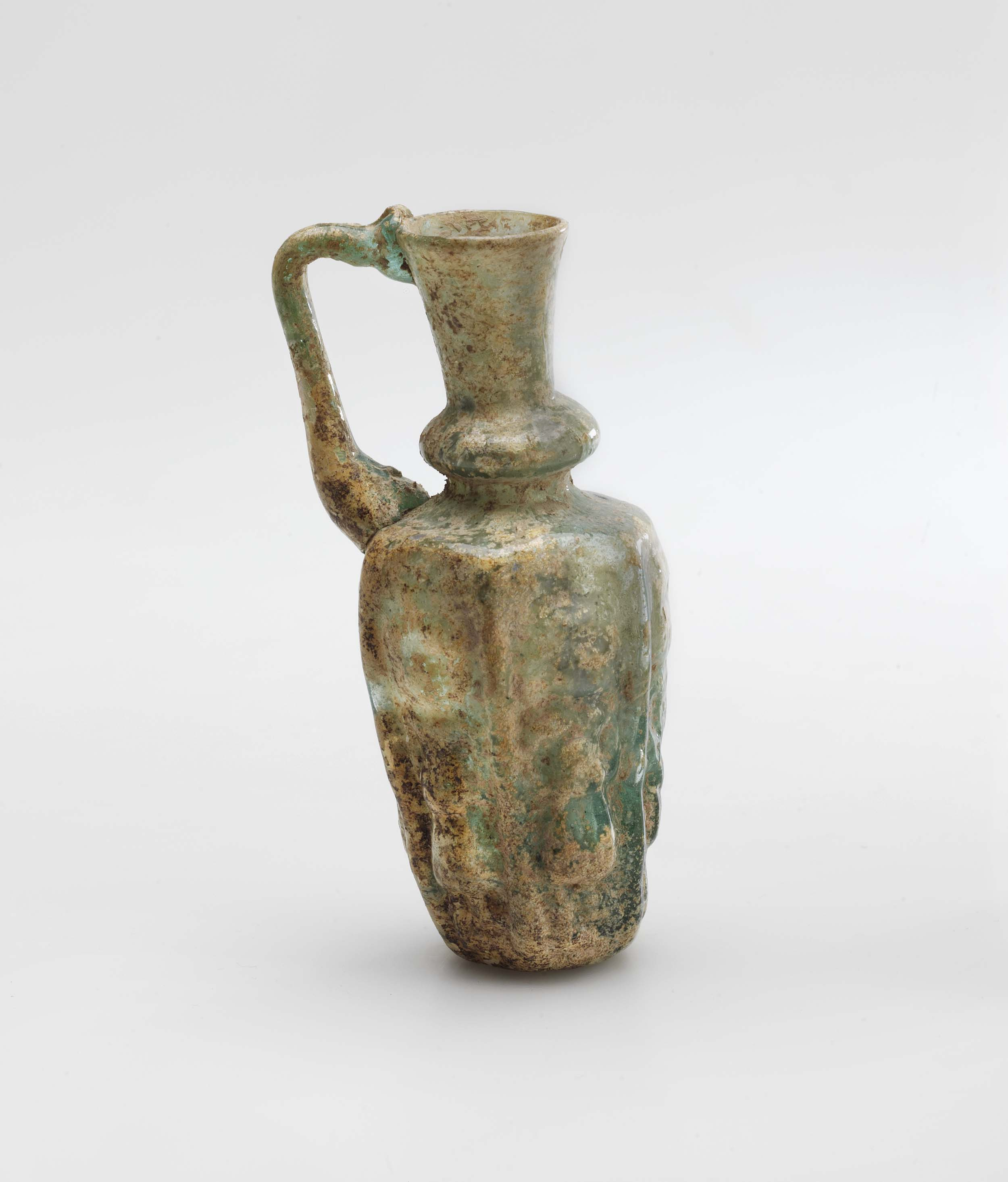
Syro-Palestinian coast, or possibly Egypt. 8th-11th century AD. Khalili Collection.

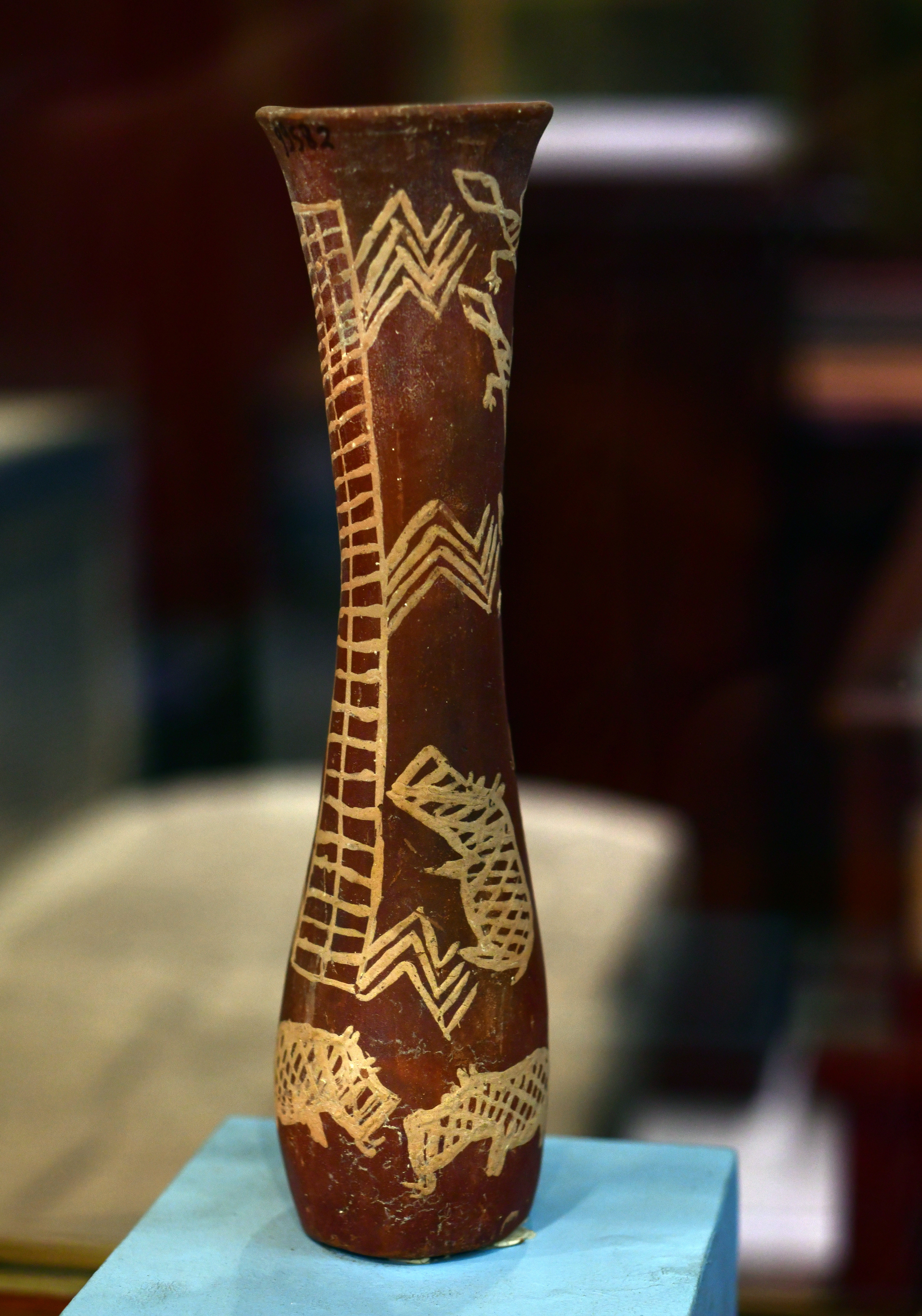
An Old Kingdom jug featuring galloping hippos in the Cairo Museum.

== See also ==
- Bartmann jug
- Bridge spouted vessel
- Carboy
- Creamer (vessel)
- Face jug
- Fuddling cup
- Growler (jug)
- Jar
- Jug wine
- Jugging
- Harvest jug
- Puzzle jug
- Toby Jug
- Silver claret jug
- Washstand
- Wenlok jug
