= Daddy Stovepipe =

American musician

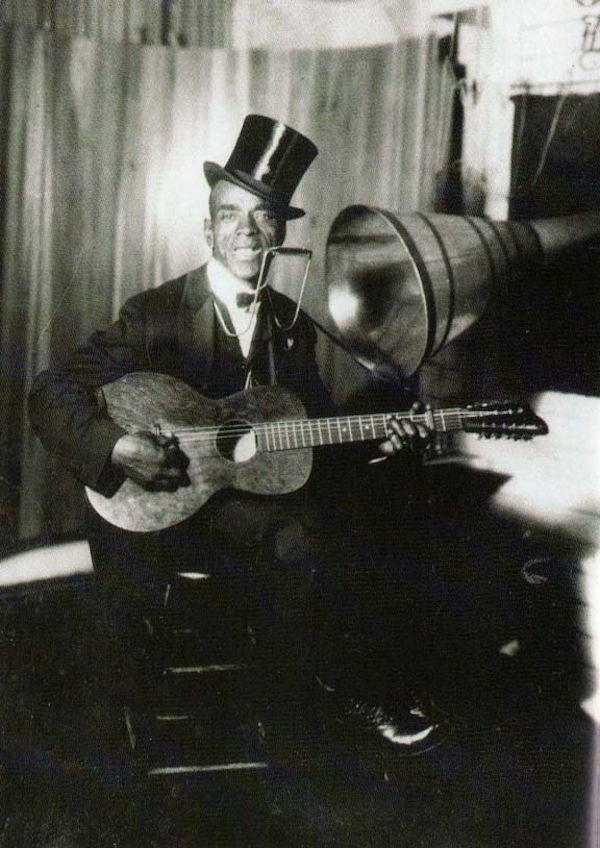
- Daddy Stovepipe at Gennett Records Studio in 1924

Background information
- Also known as: Jimmy Watson; Sunny Jim; Rev. Alfred Pitts
- Born: Johnny Watson; April 12, 1867; Mobile, Alabama, U.S.
- Died: November 1, 1963 (aged 96) Chicago, Illinois, U.S.
- Genres: Blues; jug band
- Occupations: Musician; songwriter
- Instruments: Guitar; vocals; harmonica
- Years active: Late 1890s–early 1960s

Johnny Watson (April 12, 1867 – November 1, 1963), known as Daddy Stovepipe, was an American blues singer, guitarist and harmonica player, best known for his recordings. Watson also recorded as Jimmy Watson, Sunny Jim and Rev. Alfred Pitts. He may have been the earliest-born blues performer to record.

Many of his recordings were jug band duets with his wife, Sarah Watson, who was usually credited as Mississippi Sarah.

== Life ==
Watson was born in Mobile, Alabama. His career began before 1900 in Mexico as a twelve-string guitarist in early mariachi bands. He then established himself as an entertainer with the Rabbit's Foot Minstrels touring around the southern states.

By the 1920s, he was working as a one-man band on Maxwell Street in Chicago, where he acquired the name "Daddy Stovepipe" from the characteristic top hat he wore. He first recorded in 1924, in Richmond, Indiana, recording "Sundown Blues" which is regarded as one of the most primitive blues on record. In 1927 he made more recordings, this time in Birmingham, Alabama for Gennett Records, as one half of the duo "Sunny Jim and Whistlin' Joe".

He made more recordings back in Chicago in 1931 for the Vocalion label with his wife, "Mississippi Sarah", a singer and jug player. The couple's humorous banter made their recordings unique. They recorded together again in 1935 for Bluebird Records, by which time they were living in Greenville, Mississippi, but Sarah's death in 1937 sent her husband back out on the road. He then worked for a while around Texas, playing in cajun bands and, again, with Mexican mariachi bands.

By 1948 he had returned to work as a street musician in Chicago, and was recorded in 1960, aged 93, with his repertoire having widened to include traditional popular music tunes such as "The Tennessee Waltz". He died in Chicago in 1963, from bronchial pneumonia after a gall bladder operation, aged 96.

On May 5, 2012, the fifth annual White Lake Blues Festival took place at the Howmet Playhouse Theater in Whitehall, Michigan. The event was organized by Steve Salter of the nonprofit organization Killer Blues to raise monies to honor Watson's unmarked grave with a headstone. The concert was a success, and a headstone was placed in July 2012.
