= Cincinnati Jug Band =

American jug band

The Cincinnati Jug Band was an American jug band formed in Cincinnati, Ohio in the 1920s. Much of the information concerning the involved musicians' personal background is obscured; however, the group is still remembered for being one of the earliest recorded jug bands of the era. The band recorded various sides for Vocalion, Paramount, and Decca under both the Cincinnati Jug Band and as solo artists, some of which have been preserved in several compilation albums.

Formed on George Street in Cincinnati's red-light district sometime during the late-1920s, the band was composed of two brothers: Bob Coleman (guitar, vocals) and Walter Coleman (harmonica, vocals). The Coleman brothers, who both originated from Georgia, became popular fixtures on the street, and were accompanied by multi-instrumentalist Stovepipe No. 1 (real name Sam Jones). In May 1928, Bob Coleman, under the name "Kid Cole", traveled with Stovepipe No. 1 to Chicago to record four sides for Vocalion Records. When he returned to Chicago in January 1929, Coleman brought both Walter and Stovepipe No. 1 to record four additional sides: two credited to the Cincinnati Jug Band and the remainder to Bob Coleman. The songs – "Newport Blues", "George Street Stomp", "Tear It Down", and "Cincinnati Underworld"—are among the most rarest of all jug band recordings and remain prized among record collectors. Speaking on the uniqueness of the group in view of the era, Henry Vestine of Canned Heat wrote that the Cincinnati Jug Band was "the only country-oriented jug band recording known by a non-southern based group".

Among the tunes, "Newport Blues" has since become the Cincinnati Jug Band's best-known recording. A references to Newport, Kentucky, a city frequented by Cincinnati musicians, the song features a variation of sounds on the stovepipe, performed by Jones. Some discographies theorize that Jones did not record the stovepipe alone, but was possibly accompanied by an unknown washboard player. "Newport Blues" first received wider notice on the compilation album Anthology of American Folk Music, in 1952. Anthology producer Harry Smith wrote "the line played by the jug in this recording seems to represent an earlier and more inland style than the evenly spaced bass chords heard on recordings made in Memphis". The song also appears on Complete Recordings of Bob Coleman's Cincinnati Jug Band and Associates, Before the Blues, Volume 1, and Ruckus Juice & Chittlins, The Great Jug Bands, Volume 1.

In June 1929, Bob Coleman ventured solo to Richmond, Indiana, to record for Paramount the tune, "Sing Song Blues". The brothers recorded two final times in February and June 1936 in Chicago, completing seven sides for the Decca label. A few mere months after their final recording session, Walter Coleman was listed as dead at the age of 29 in a Cincinnati obituary, and, although no official cause of death was listed, it is suspected he was murdered while performing in a venue on George Street. Bob Coleman retired from music and died in 1966. Stovepipe No. 1 recorded with the King David Jug Band in December 1930; however, he disappeared from the public eye thereafter.
