= American VI: Ain't No Grave =

Studio album by Johnny Cash
- Released: February 23, 2010
- Recorded: May–August 2003
- Genre: Americana; country; gospel
- Length: 32:21
- Label: American; Lost Highway
- Producer: Rick Rubin

Johnny Cash chronology
The Legend of Johnny Cash Vol. II (2006)	American VI: Ain't No Grave (2010)	Johnny Cash: The Complete Columbia Album Collection (2012)

American series chronology
American V: A Hundred Highways (2006)	American VI: Ain't No Grave (2010)

Singles from American VI: Ain't No Grave
- 1. "Ain't No Grave (Gonna Hold This Body Down)" Released: February 9, 2010

American VI: Ain't No Grave is an album by Johnny Cash released posthumously on February 23, 2010 on American Recordings and Lost Highway Records. Its release was three days before Cash's 78th birthday. The tracks were recorded during the same sessions as American V: A Hundred Highways (2006), which took place during the final months of Cash's life. The album debuted at number three on the US Billboard 200 chart, selling 54,000 copies in its first week. Upon its release, American VI: Ain't No Grave received generally positive reviews from music critics.

American VI was the only release in the American Recordings series to contain no re-recordings of previously released songs.

== Critical reception ==
Professional ratings
Aggregate scores
Source	Rating
AnyDecentMusic?	7.1/10
Metacritic	78/100
Review scores
Source	Rating
AllMusic	4/5 stars
The A.V. Club	A
The Daily Telegraph	5/5 stars
The Independent	4/5 stars
MSN Music (Consumer Guide)	A
NME	4/10
Pitchfork	5.6/10
Rolling Stone	3.5/5 stars
Slant Magazine	3/5 stars
The Times	4/5 stars

American VI received generally positive reviews from music critics. At Metacritic, which assigns a normalized rating out of 100 to reviews from mainstream critics, the album received an average score of 78, based on 19 reviews. The Times writer Pete Paphides wrote that Cash's "most soulful performances on American VI are invested in Nashville standards". Andy Gill of The Independent declared the album less strong than American V: A Hundred Highways, but maintains that this installment, "comes so close to those heights [that it] is cause for rejoicing." The Washington Post's Bill Friskics-Warren wrote that the album presents Cash as "an unwavering man of faith" and noted a "spiritual, even biblical quality to the record". Los Angeles Times writer Ann Powers called it "Cash's hospice record" and lauded his musicianship. MSN Music's Robert Christgau called the album "both the grimmest and the most hopeful" of "those nearness-of-death albums" that in his mind include Mississippi John Hurt's Last Sessions (1972), Bob Dylan's Time Out of Mind (1997), Warren Zevon's The Wind (2003), and Neil Young's Prairie Wind (2005). Greg Kot of the Chicago Tribune said that "death remains the big subject on VI, and Rubin magnifies the drama." The Daily Telegraph's Andrew Perry dubbed it "Cash’s final, life-affirming masterpiece".

In a mixed review, Slant Magazine's Jesse Cataldo wrote that "the angle imposed here is a double-edged sword, granting a too-strict formula for these songs to occupy, but also granting a greater measure of artistic freedom". Pitchfork Media's Stephen M. Deusner criticized Rick Rubin's production, stating "Ain't No Grave isn't really Cash's farewell as much as it is Rubin's memorial mixtape".

Although cited at the time as the final expected release of recordings from the American sessions (as had American V before it), in March 2014, John Carter Cash indicated that "three or four albums worth" of American material may be released.

== Commercial performance ==
The album debuted at number three on the US Billboard 200 chart with first-week sales of 54,000 copies, becoming Cash's third posthumous top-ten album in the U.S. As of March 2014, the album has sold 250,000 copies in the US.

In the United Kingdom, the album entered at number nine on the UK Albums Chart. It has sold 62,000 in the UK as of March 2014. American VI: Ain't No Grave also attained international chart success, charting within the top-ten of several other countries.

== Track listing ==
No.	Title	Writer(s)	Length
1.	"Ain't No Grave (Gonna Hold This Body Down)"	Claude Ely	2:53
2.	"Redemption Day"	Sheryl Crow	4:22
3.	"For the Good Times"	Kris Kristofferson	3:22
4.	"I Corinthians 15:55"	Johnny Cash	3:38
5.	"Can't Help But Wonder Where I'm Bound"	Tom Paxton	3:26
6.	"Satisfied Mind"	Red Hayes, Jack Rhodes	2:48
7.	"I Don't Hurt Anymore"	Don Robertson, Walter E. Rollins	2:45
8.	"Cool Water"	Bob Nolan	2:53
9.	"Last Night I Had the Strangest Dream"	Ed McCurdy	3:14
10.	"Aloha Oe"	Queen Liliʻuokalani	3:00
Total length:			32:21

== Personnel ==
Adapted from the album liner notes.

- Johnny Cash – vocals, guitar
- Scott Avett – banjo on "Ain't No Grave"
- Seth Avett – footsteps & chains on "Ain't No Grave"
- Mike Campbell – guitar
- Smokey Hormel – guitar
- Jonny Polonsky – guitar
- Matt Sweeney – guitar
- Benmont Tench – piano, harpsichord, organ

== Charts ==
Album - Billboard (United States)

=== Weekly charts ===
Chart (2010)	Peak position
US Billboard 200	3
US Top Country Albums (Billboard)	2
Australian Albums (ARIA)	22
Austrian Albums (Ö3 Austria)	1
Belgian Albums (Ultratop Flanders)	14
Belgian Albums (Ultratop Wallonia)	35
Canadian Albums (Billboard)	4
Croatian Albums (HDU)	9
Danish Albums (Hitlisten)	2
Dutch Albums (Album Top 100)	2
Finnish Albums (Suomen virallinen lista)	11
French Albums (SNEP)	59
German Albums (Offizielle Top 100)	3
Greek Albums (IFPI)	11
Italian Albums (FIMI)	75
New Zealand Albums (RMNZ)	12
Norwegian Albums (VG-lista)	3
Spanish Albums (Promusicae)	33
Swedish Albums (Sverigetopplistan)	5
Swiss Albums (Schweizer Hitparade)	10
UK Albums (OCC)	9
UK Country Albums (OCC)	1
Scottish Albums (OCC)	9

=== Year-end charts ===
Chart (2010)	Position
Austrian Albums (Ö3 Austria)	62
Belgian Albums (Ultratop Flanders)	98
Danish Albums (Hitlisten)	39
Dutch Albums (Album Top 100)	54
Swedish Albums (Sverigetopplistan)	78
US Top Country Albums (Billboard)	37

== Certifications ==
Region	Certification	Certified units/sales
Denmark (IFPI Danmark)	Platinum	20,000^{‡}
United Kingdom (BPI)	Silver	60,000^{^}
^{^} Shipments figures based on certification alone.^{‡} Sales+streaming figures based on certification alone.

== Future releases ==
The liner notes of Unearthed, a box set composed of outtakes from the first four entries in Cash's American series, claim "around 50" songs were recorded during the American V sessions before Cash's death on September 12, 2003. However, to date only two albums worth of material have been released from these sessions. In March 2014, Cash's son John Carter Cash, promoting the release of Out Among the Stars, a collection of recently unearthed recordings from the early 1980s, confirmed that "three or four albums" worth of unreleased material exist from the American sessions, with Rubin confirming that at least one additional album, a follow-up to Unearthed, is planned for future release.
