= Prairie Wind =

Studio album by Neil Young
- Released: September 27, 2005
- Recorded: March 19 – June 29, 2005
- Studios: Masterlink, Nashville, Tennessee
- Genres: Country rock; folk rock; Americana
- Length: 52:05
- Label: Reprise
- Producers: Neil Young; Ben Keith

Neil Young chronology
Greatest Hits (2004)	Prairie Wind (2005)	Living with War (2006)

Prairie Wind is the twenty-eighth studio album by Canadian / American musician Neil Young, released on September 27, 2005.

After an album rooted in 1960s soul music, Are You Passionate?, and the musical novel Greendale, Prairie Wind features an acoustic-based sound reminiscent of his earlier commercially successful albums Harvest and Harvest Moon. The album's songs find Young pondering his own mortality, as he was undergoing treatment for an aneurysm during the album's production. Songs were also inspired by the extended illness of his father, Canadian sportswriter and novelist Scott Young, who passed a few weeks after the album was completed. The album is dedicated in part to the elder Young.

== Writing ==
The songs find Young reminiscing about his youth, reflecting on the passing of time, and considering his own mortality in light of his father's illness and his own health scare. The album was written and recorded after diagnosis but before undergoing minimally invasive surgery for an aneurysm in the spring of 2005. Young recorded the album's songs on a guitar owned by Hank Williams. In a January 2006 interview for Rolling Stone, Young explained his song writing process:

In writing, you have to try to be as unaffected as you can by what's going on around you, while also writing about what's going on around you. I like to remove myself from me to be able to write about the thing I want to write about, I like to think about myself as another soul on the planet. In the morning maybe I'll come out to the studio and start a fire, pick up a guitar. Different guitars make you write differently. Each day's different, though. Could be writing while I'm walking. If it's not happening, I continue living my life. I look at writing songs as like hunting for a wild animal, but you're not trying to kill it. You're trying to communicate with it, to coax it out of its lair. You don't go over and set a fire and try to force it from its lair, or try to scare it out. When it comes out, you don't want it to be scared of you. You have to be pan of what it sees as it's looking around, what it takes as natural, so that it doesn't regard you as a threat. To me, songs are a living thing. It's not hunting to capture. I just want to get a glimpse of it, so I can record it.

"Falling Off the Face of the Earth," was inspired by a voicemail left for Young wishing him well as he went into surgery. "Most things just came pouring out, but that song's unique because a lot of it came from a voice-mail message. A friend of mine called, knowing I was going through this, and left me a voice mail that was, 'Thinking about you; just want to tell you that you mean a lot to me,' that kind of stuff. So I wrote it all down and made up this kind of bass-ackwards melody. With songwriting, the key thing is not to have any preconceptions, to be wide open and never worry about whether it's cool or not. Use whatever you can, and worry about cool after you finish the record." Young elaborates to NPR's Terry Gross:

I had a melody that I was writing, that'd just come up with that night. And then I was going to bed and I couldn't come up with the lyrics. But I had a melody and chord changes. So I thought, well, you know, I'll just go to sleep, and I'll wake up in the morning and start playing the changes and the words will be there. So, I checked my voicemail and I had a message from Jim Jarmusch...he was just thinking about me and so he left me a message. And some of the phrases that are in the message. I played it again and I wrote down some of the phrases that he used. And in the morning I had the song all done because some of the phrases that he used in the voice-mail were in the... I just used them out of context in this song and kind of opened up the door for everything else. So, the chorus and everything all just fell out.

"Far From Home" finds Young remembering his father buying him his first musical instrument, an Arthur Godfrey ukulele, and learning to perform songs from his family members:

"When I was just a kid, about eight years old or something, I was a chicken farmer. I had some chickens - I had about thirty-five of them I think. My daddy used to take me out on the weekends and we'd deliver the eggs. And I'd also deliver a newspaper that my dad wrote for because it was some weekend edition kind of thing that I could deliver without getting in the way of going to school. Anyway, one morning Daddy came home. He had this plastic Arthur Godfrey ukulele and he showed it to me. I looked at it and I didn't know much about that. I'd seen it in the store where I bought my 45 RPMs. But I must have said something about it because he bought it for me. And then he played a song on it. I'd never seen him sing or play before and I remember I was shocked. And he moved his hands around on it and made these funny sounds. And then he sang a song called "Bury Me Out On The Prairie": first song. And then he gave me this big smile. And I'm going, 'Wow!' After that I got more into and our family used to get together and sing songs. My uncle Bob and my dad and my grandma."

"Here for You" was written for his daughter, Amber, as she finished college and Young transitioned to life as an empty nester: "She's 21 and she's moving on, you know, she's in college, she's graduating, and I'm really proud of her and how well she is doing. She's an artist, and you know, of course, I miss her all the time but I really don't want to intrude so I was just trying to communicate to her that she has a place to go, but it wasn't a place she had to go, you know. She--if she needed me, I was there, that myself and her mother would be there for her if she ever needed us and that she was free to go and free to stay, and that we were behind her all the way, you know. So it is just that kind of a song, a kind of letting go without letting go."

"When God Made Me" was written on piano: "First of all I didn't know what I was doing. There was a little room with a piano in it. And the piano is locked in the room. It'll never leave the room unless they destroy the room. It can't leave because the room was built around it. And the room is in a church. The studio is in a church. So the ceiling of this studio has got a few little vents in it. And if you stand on top of a ladder with a flashlight and look up through the holes you can see the church windows. And this old huge roof and everything, and it's closed off, because to get the right sound and everything they, they made a lower roof. But when you see that, it really gets you. And then I just started playing this hymn. And Spooner Oldham is one of the most beautiful, beautiful gospel players on the organ; it's just great. I mean he's just alive with it. So I've learned a lot from him over the years, just listening to him. So all the passing chords and the blending of things together. But all hymns seem to have these little passages on the piano between them that sets up the next verse, kind of gets everybody in the key and kicks it around and gets ready to go. So I found myself just playing this and I had absolutely no idea what I was doing."

== Recording ==
Young recorded the album at Masterlink Studios in Nashville, where Roy Orbison had also previously recorded when it was Monument Recording Studios. The recording sessions were video recorded, and a deluxe edition of the album contains a bonus DVD with footage of each song being recorded.

The songs were recorded as they were written, and the track order reflects the order in which the songs were recorded. Young explains in an October 2005 interview for Time magazine:

I went into the studio on Thursday and recorded three songs. I wrote one on the way there and two more right away after I recorded the first one. The whole album's chronological; I wrote and recorded in the order it appears on the record. Then I went back up to New York on Monday for a pre-surgery thing, flew back to Nashville, wrote and recorded four, five, six, seven, eight and most of nine and ten. And then I got admitted, and they put me under.

The album features the rhythm section of Rick Rosas and Chad Cromwell, with whom he had previously recorded on 1989's Freedom. The album sees Young reunited with many of the Nashville musicians that had appeared on Young's previous albums Comes a Time, Harvest Moon and Silver & Gold. Emmylou Harris and his wife Pegi Young provide backing vocals. Director Jonathan Demme recalls Young raving about working with many of the musicians:

"One of the things that Neil talked constantly about in our early conversations on the telephone was just his tremendous regard and love for the other musicians, Pegi and Emmylou and Ben Keith and everybody. He spoke individually about every single person, and he would pepper our conversations with--you know, Anthony Crawford comes up on that song and, you know, that's the song that Grant Boatwright plays the electric guitar on."

Several songs also feature ensemble accompaniment. The song "No Wonder" features the Fisk University Jubilee Choir. "Far from Home" and "Prairie Wind" feature a horn section arranged by Wayne Jackson of The Memphis Horns. "It's a Dream" features a string section arranged by Chuck Cochran, who also arranged the string sections on Comes a Time.

== Promotion ==
A premiere live performance of Prairie Wind was held on 18–19 August 2005 at the Ryman Auditorium in Nashville. Here, Young held a two-night concert where songs from the album were performed. These concerts became the subject of a film directed by Jonathan Demme entitled Heart of Gold.

Young debuted the album's closing track, "When God Made Me", at the Live 8 concert in Barrie, Ontario, Canada.

== Critical reception ==
Professional ratings
Aggregate scores
Source	Rating
Metacritic	73/100
Review scores
Source	Rating
AllMusic	3.5/5 stars
Blender	4/5 stars
The Guardian	4/5 stars
The Independent	4/5 stars
Los Angeles Times	4/4 stars
Pitchfork	5.8/10
Rolling Stone	3.5/5 stars
Q	4/5 stars
Uncut	10/10
The Village Voice	A−

The record was regarded by Robert Christgau as "one of those nearness-of-death albums", along with Mississippi John Hurt's Last Sessions (1972), Bob Dylan's Time Out of Mind (1997), Warren Zevon's The Wind (2003), and Johnny Cash's American VI: Ain't No Grave (2010).

== Commercial performance ==
The album debuted on the Billboard 200 album chart at number 11, on October 15, 2005, with sales of approximately 72,000 copies. It remained on the chart for 26 weeks. It was awarded a certified gold record by the RIAA on January 23, 2006. Prairie Wind received two Grammy Award nominations at the 2006 Grammy Awards - "Best Rock Album of the Year" and "Best Rock Solo Performance" for "The Painter".

== Track listing ==
All songs written by Neil Young

No.	Title	Length
1.	"The Painter"	4:36
2.	"No Wonder"	5:45
3.	"Falling Off the Face of the Earth"	3:35
4.	"Far From Home"	3:47
5.	"It's a Dream"	6:31
6.	"Prairie Wind"	7:34
7.	"Here for You"	4:32
8.	"This Old Guitar"	5:32
9.	"He Was the King"	6:08
10.	"When God Made Me"	4:05
11.	"An Interview with Neil Young" (LP only)	19:06

== Personnel ==
- Neil Young – acoustic guitar, electric guitar, harmonica, piano, vocals
- Ben Keith – Dobro, pedal steel, slide guitar
- Spooner Oldham – piano, Hammond B3 organ, Wurlitzer electric piano
- Rick Rosas – bass
- Karl Himmel – drums, percussion
- Chad Cromwell – drums, percussion
- Grant Boatwright – acoustic guitar (5), backing vocals (1)
- Clinton Gregory – fiddle (2)
- Wayne Jackson – horns (4, 6, 9)
- Thomas McGinley – horns (4, 6, 9)
- Emmylou Harris – special guest vocalist (2, 4, 8)
- Pegi Young – backing vocals (2–4, 6–7, 9)
- Diana Dewitt – backing vocals (2–4, 6–7, 9)
- Anthony Crawford – backing vocals (1, 2, 6)
- Gary Pigg – backing vocals (2, 9)
- Curtis Wright – backing vocals (2)
- Chuck Cochran – string arranger
- Fisk University Jubilee Choir, directed by Paul Kwami

Additional roles

- Gary Burden, Jenice Heo – art direction and design
- L.A. Johnson – photography
- Larry Cragg – photography
- Elliot Roberts – direction
- Chad Hailey, Rob Clark – recording and mixing
- Tim Mulligan – mastering

DVD production

- L.A. Johnson – photography direction
- Elliot Robinowitz – executive production
- Toshi Onuki – editor
- Rich Winter – authoring

== Charts ==
Chart performance for Prairie Wind
Chart (2005)	Peak position
Australian Albums (ARIA)	59
Austrian Albums (Ö3 Austria)	22
Belgian Albums (Ultratop Flanders)	10
Belgian Albums (Ultratop Wallonia)	30
Canadian Albums (Billboard)	3
Danish Albums (Hitlisten)	8
Dutch Albums (Album Top 100)	15
Finnish Albums (Suomen virallinen lista)	16
French Albums (SNEP)	25
German Albums (Offizielle Top 100)	16
Irish Albums (IRMA)	11
Italian Albums (FIMI)	9
New Zealand Albums (RMNZ)	29
Norwegian Albums (VG-lista)	3
Spanish Albums (Promusicae)	65
Swedish Albums (Sverigetopplistan)	3
Swiss Albums (Schweizer Hitparade)	56
UK Albums (Official Charts)	22
US Billboard 200	11
US Indie Store Album Sales (Billboard)	10

== Certifications ==
Certifications for Prairie Wind
Region	Certification	Certified units/sales
Ireland (IRMA)	Gold	7,500^{^}
United Kingdom (BPI)	Silver	60,000^{^}
United States (RIAA)	Gold	500,000^{^}
^{^} Shipments figures based on certification alone.
