= Today! (Mississippi John Hurt album) =

Studio album by Mississippi John Hurt
- Released: 1966
- Recorded: 1964
- Genre: Folk, blues
- Length: 43:07
- Label: Vanguard
- Producer: Patrick Sky

Mississippi John Hurt chronology
Worried Blues (1964)	Today! (1966)	The Immortal Mississippi John Hurt (1967)

Today! is the second studio album, but third body of work recorded by folk/country blues musician Mississippi John Hurt. It was released in 1966 by Vanguard Records. This album contains some of the first commercial material recorded after his "rediscovery" in 1963, and is the first he recorded for Vanguard. The album spans several genres and styles of music, ranging from traditional blues and folk songs, to country, to African-American spirituals. Along with Hurt's two previous releases, Today! helped to reveal his work to a wider folk audience. In 2009, the album was one of the twenty-five selections that were added to the Library of Congress' National Recording Registry.

== Background and recording ==
Hurt had made commercial recordings for the now-defunct Okeh Records in 1928; these did not sell well, and he drifted back into obscurity in southern Mississippi. In 1952, Harry Smith's Anthology of American Folk Music, which contained two tracks by Hurt, was released. As well as this, a man had discovered a copy of Hurt's "Avalon Blues", which gave the name of Hurt's home town, Avalon, Mississippi. In 1963, Tom Hoskins and Richard Spotswood, two folk enthusiasts, located him in Avalon using the song. Hoskins convinced him to move to Washington, D.C., where there would be plenty of opportunities to perform to an increasing folk audience. There, he made his first post-war recordings, which were released on the Gryphon label as Folk Songs and Blues.

Hurt was invited to perform at the Newport Folk Festival in 1963, where he was greeted as a "living legend". Following this performance, he began to tour around various universities, and recorded a second album in 1964. Through touring, Hurt's audience continued to grow, which prompted a recording contract with Vanguard Records and the release of his third album, Today!, in 1966. A similar recording and performance schedule was adopted by the fellow bluesman Skip James around this same time, who also recorded for Vanguard an album of the same name.

== Reception ==
Professional ratings
Review scores
Source	Rating
Allmusic	4/5 stars
Music Angle	8/10 stars
The Penguin Guide to Blues Recordings	4/4 stars

David Freedlander, of Allmusic, writes this of Today!:

It shows ... that all that the great bluesman has lost is years; his voice retains its characteristic Buddha-esque warmth and it is still difficult to believe that there is just one man playing on the seemingly effortless guitar work ... that sound, along with a mellow and heartfelt voice, wizened here by decades, combine to make Today! an unforgettable whole. A truly essential album of the folk revival, unrivaled in its beauty and warmth.

== Track listing ==
All songs written by Hurt, except when noted

Side one

1. "Pay Day"
2. "I'm Satisfied"
3. "Candy Man"
4. "Make Me a Pallet on Your Floor" (trad.)
5. "Talking Casey"
6. "Corrina, Corrina" (trad.)

Side two

1. "Coffee Blues"
2. "Louis Collins"
3. "Hot Time in the Old Town Tonight" (trad.)
4. "If You Don't Want Me Baby"
5. "Spike Driver Blues" (trad., arranged John Hurt)
6. "Beulah Land" (trad.)

== Personnel ==
- Mississippi John Hurt – guitar, vocals

== See also ==
- Today! (Skip James album)
- The Lovin' Spoonful, a band whose name was inspired by the song "Coffee Blues"
