= Robert Wilkins =

American country blues guitarist and singer

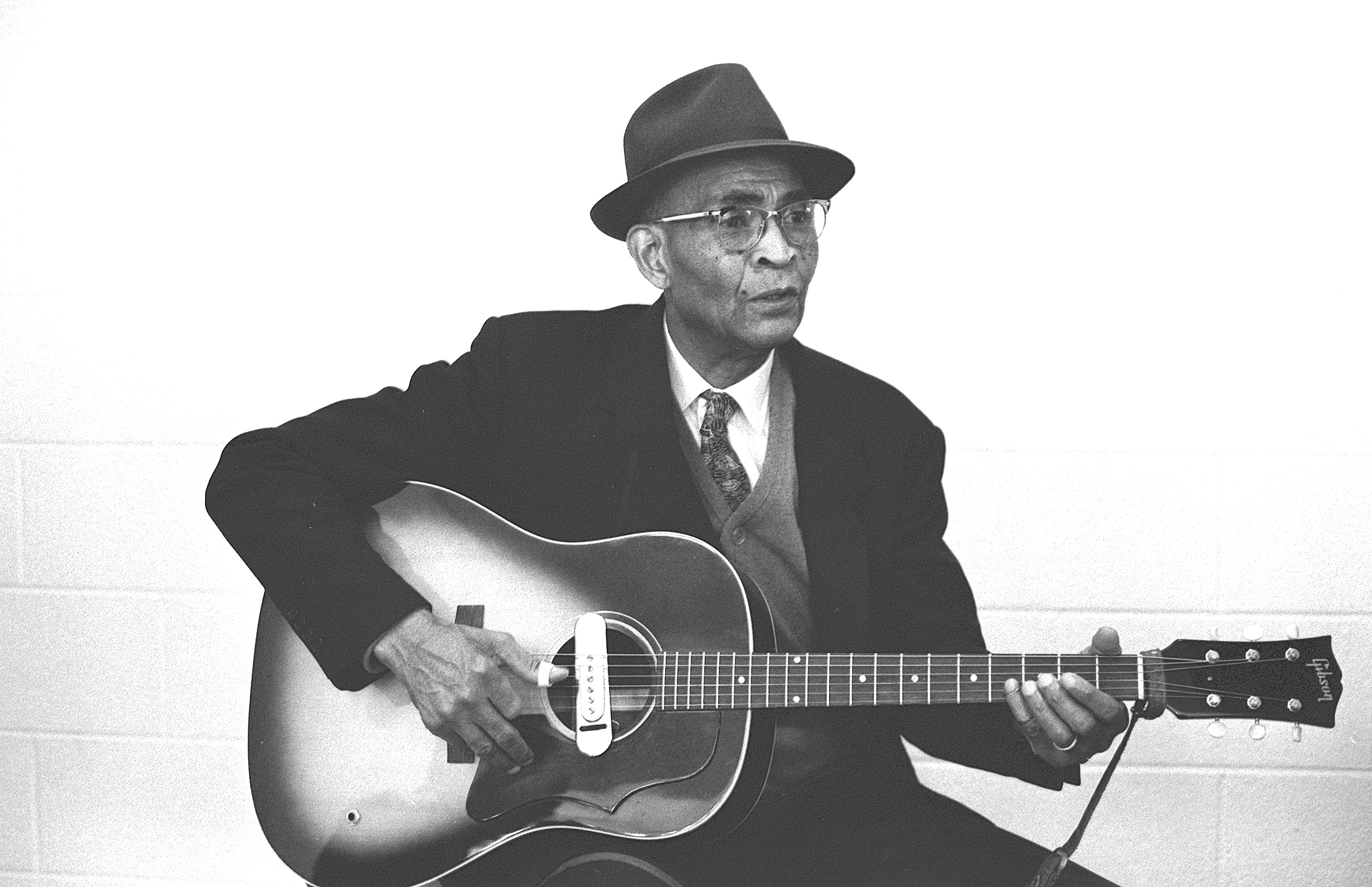
- Wilkins in 1970

Background information
- Also known as: "Reverend" Robert Wilkins; Tim Wilkins; Tim Oliver
- Born: Robert Timothy Wilkins; January 16, 1896; Hernando, Mississippi, U.S.
- Died: May 26, 1987 (aged 91) Memphis, Tennessee, U.S.
- Genres: Country blues, gospel blues, delta blues
- Occupation: Musician
- Instruments: Guitar; vocals
- Years active: 1927–1960s
- Label: Vanguard

Robert Timothy Wilkins (January 16, 1896 – May 26, 1987) was an American country blues guitarist and vocalist, of African-American and Cherokee descent. His distinction was his versatility: he could play ragtime, blues, minstrel songs, and gospel music with equal facility.

== Career ==
Wilkins was born in Hernando, Mississippi, 21 miles from Memphis, Tennessee. He performed in Memphis and north Mississippi during the 1920s and early 1930s, the same time as Furry Lewis, Memphis Minnie (whom he claimed to have tutored), and Son House. He also organized a jug band to capitalize on the "jug band craze" then in vogue. Though never attaining success comparable to that of the Memphis Jug Band, Wilkins reinforced his local popularity with a 1927 appearance on a Memphis radio station. From 1928 to 1936 he recorded for Victor and Brunswick Records, alone or with a single accompanist, like Sleepy John Estes, and unlike Gus Cannon of Cannon's Jug Stompers. He sometimes performed as Tom Wilkins or as Tim Oliver (his stepfather's name).

In 1936, at the age of 40, he quit playing the blues and joined the church after witnessing a murder where he performed. In 1950, he was ordained. In 1964 Wilkins was "rediscovered" by blues revival enthusiasts Dick and Louisa Spottswood, making appearances at folk festivals and recording his gospel blues for a new audience. These include the 1964 Newport Folk Festival; his performance of "Prodigal Son" there was included on the Vanguard Records album Blues at Newport, Volume 2. In 1964 he also recorded his first full album, Rev. Robert Wilkins: Memphis Gospel Singer, for Piedmont Records. Another full session, recorded live at the 1969 Memphis Country Blues Festival, was released in 1993 as "...Remember Me".

Wilkins died on May 26, 1987, in Memphis at the age of 91. His son, Reverend John Wilkins (1943–2020), continued his father's gospel blues legacy.

His best-known songs are "That's No Way to Get Along" and his reworked gospel version, "The Prodigal Son" (covered under the title “Prodigal Son” by the Rolling Stones on their 1968 album Beggars Banquet), “Rollin' Stone” parts 1 and 2 (the first known recording of the phrase ‘Rolling Stone'), and "Old Jim Canan's".

There were some crediting issues surrounding the Rolling Stones’ cover of “The Prodigal Son”. Early pressings of Beggars Banquet credited Mick Jagger and Keith Richards as composers, rather than Wilkins. The original Beggars Banquet toilet cover credited Wilkins. When the record company rejected the toilet cover, the revised invitation-inspired cover mistakenly credited Jagger-Richards as composer. Once the error was pointed out to London Records and the Stones business office, publishing, royalties and other attendant financial details were fixed, and Wilkins was properly credited. Recent CD reissues use the toilet cover with the correct crediting. Despite the confusion, Wilkins was pleased to have his song covered: “He seemed quite happy that people will be hearing his song“.

== See also ==
- Memphis blues
- Adelphi Records
