= Rediscovered =

Rediscovered may refer to:

- Rediscovered (A1 album), 2012
- Rediscovered (Andreas Johnson album), 2008
- Rediscovered (Mississippi John Hurt album), 1998
- Re:(disc)overed, an album by Puddle of Mudd, 2011

== See also ==
- List of rediscovered films
