= Rediscovered (Mississippi John Hurt album) =

Compilation album by Mississippi John Hurt
- Released: August 11, 1998
- Genre: Blues
- Length: 74:53
- Label: Vanguard

Mississippi John Hurt chronology
Legend (1997)	Rediscovered (1998)	The Best of Mississippi John Hurt (1999)

Rediscovered is a posthumous 1998 Mississippi John Hurt compilation album released on Vanguard Records. It contains 23 songs that had previously been released on four of Hurt's earlier Vanguard albums: Today!, The Immortal Mississippi John Hurt, Last Sessions, and The Best of Mississippi John Hurt. The album's liner notes were written by Ed Ward.

== Reviews ==
Professional ratings
Review scores
Source	Rating
AllMusic	4/5 stars
Columbia Journal	(highly favorable)
The Encyclopedia of Popular Music	3/5 stars
No Depression	(highly favorable)
The Village Voice	A+
The Penguin Guide to Blues Recordings	3/4 stars

AllMusic's Matt Fink gave Rediscovered 4 out of 5 stars, writing that "These recordings are some of the last Hurt would make before his death, and are fine evidence of just how good he still was up until his last days."

== Track listing ==
1. Coffee Blues (John Hurt)
2. I'm Satisfied (John Hurt)
3. Make Me A Pallett On Your Floor (Public Domain)
4. Monday Morning Blues (John Hurt)
5. Since I've Laid My Burden Down (Public Domain)
6. Stocktime (Buck Dance) (John Hurt)
7. Hot Time In The Old Town Tonight (John Hurt)
8. Richland Woman Blues (John Hurt)
9. Keep On Knocking (John Hurt)
10. Stagolee (John Hurt)
11. Hop Joint (John Hurt)
12. Funky Butt (John Hurt)
13. It Ain't Nobody's Business (Public Domain)
14. Salty Dog Blues (Wiley & Zeke Morris)
15. Candy Man (John Hurt)
16. You Are My Sunshine (Public Domain)
17. I've Got The Blues And I Can't Be Satisfied (John Hurt)
18. Nearer My God To Thee (Public Domain)
19. Shortnin' Bread (Public Domain)
20. Avalon, My Home Town (John Hurt)
21. First Shot Missed Him (John Hurt)
22. Let The Mermaids Flirt With Me (John Hurt)
23. Talking Casey (John Hurt)
24. Goodnight Irene (Huddie Ledbetter & John Lomax)

== Personnel ==
- Georgette Cartwright – Creative director
- David Gahr – Photography
- Mississippi John Hurt – Primary artist
- Patrick Sky – Production Supervisor
- Tom Vickers – Compilation Producer
- Ed Ward – Liner notes
- Captain Jeff Zaraya – Engineer
