= Masters of Turkish Music =

Compilation album by various artists
- Released: 1990
- Recorded: 1906–1949
- Genre: Turkish classical music
- Length: 70:01
- Label: Rounder

Masters of Turkish Music chronology
Masters of Turkish Music (1990)	Masters of Turkish Music: Volume 2 (1996)

Masters of Turkish Music is a compilation album released by Rounder Records in 1990. The record features 20 tracks of Turkish classical music, compiled and restored from the 78s recorded between 1906 and 1949.

== Critical reception ==
Professional ratings
Review scores
Source	Rating
AllMusic	4.5/5 stars

AllMusic critic Richie Unterberger gave a rave review to the album, stating: "The taksim (improvisations) and gazels (vocal improvisations) are extremely emotional and moving, and there is a good deal of variety in the 75-minute program, in both content and instrumentation." Unterberger also praised the sound and audio restoration on the record, writing that "even on the performances dating back to the early 20th century, the transfers seem to be clear as technology will allow."

== Track listing ==
No.	Title	Performer	Length
1.	"Beledim Kaç Gece"	Tarsus'lu Abdülkerim	3:08
2.	"Yârin Bu Kadar Cervi Gelir Miydi Hayâle"	Safiye Ayla	3:10
3.	"Mâhitâbim Beyi Seyrâne Mi Çiktin Bu Gece"	Hafız Şaşı Osman Efendi	3:30
4.	"Bî-Karar Olmakti Sevmekten Murâdi Gönlümün"	Isak El-Gazi	2:49
5.	"Derdime Vakif Degil"	Nafi Bey	3:30
6.	"Bozlak and Halay"	Yozgatlı Hafiz Süleyman Bey	4:08
7.	"Bülbül-I Sûrîdeyim Gülden Nasîbim Var Benim"	Münir Nurettin Selçuk	6:20
8.	"Saatlerce Basbasa Kaldigimiz Geceler"	Safiye Ayla	3:15
9.	"Nîm Nigâhin Katle Ferman"	Hafız Burhan Sesyılmaz	3:51
10.	"Bir Katrc Içen Çesme-I Pür-Hûn-I Fenâdan"	Isak El-Gazi	3:48
11.	"Çiftetelli"	Klârnetçi Şükrü Tunar	3:48
12.	"Karsilama Dance"	Nick Doneff	2:53
13.	"Oyun Havası"	Kemanî Haydar Tatlıyay	3:14
14.	"Mânî"	Gülistan Hanım	3:01
15.	"Halay Dance"	Zurnacı Halil	3:19
16.	"Taksim"	Refik Fersan	3:05
17.	"Taksim"	Kemani Nubar Çömlekçiyan Tekyay	3:25
18.	"Taksim"	Tanburi Cemil Bey	3:39
19.	"Taksim"	Tanburi Cemil Bey	3:10
20.	"Taksim"	Melkon Alemsherian	4:15

== Personnel ==
Album personnel as adapted from liner notes.

- Ercüment G. Aksoy — assistant, liner notes
- Munir Nurettin Beken — assistant, liner notes
- Nancy Given — design
- Talat Halman — liner notes
- Karl Signell — liner notes
- Richard K. Spottswood — disc sources, liner notes
- Hugo Strötbaum — photography
- Jack Towers — restoration
- Necdet Yaşar — assistant, liner notes
