= Last Sessions (Mississippi John Hurt album) =

Compilation album by Mississippi John Hurt
- Released: 1972
- Recorded: February – July 1966
- Genre: Blues
- Length: 45:44
- Label: Vanguard
- Producer: Patrick Sky

Mississippi John Hurt chronology
The Best of Mississippi John Hurt (1970)	Last Sessions (1972)	Volume One of a Legacy (1975)

Last Sessions is an album by Mississippi John Hurt. It was recorded at a Manhattan hotel in February and July 1966 shortly before Hurt's death that year, and released in 1972 by Vanguard Records.

== Critical reception ==
Professional ratings
Review scores
Source	Rating
AllMusic	4.5/5 stars
Christgau's Record Guide	A
MusicHound Folk	3/5
The New Rolling Stone Record Guide	4/5 stars
The Penguin Guide to Blues Recordings	3/4 stars

Reviewing Last Sessions in Christgau's Record Guide: Rock Albums of the Seventies (1981), Robert Christgau wrote:

For some reason folk specialists hold these clear if casual tapes in low esteem, but I think they stand with [Hurt's] other Vanguard music. Recorded in a Manhattan hotel in February and July 1966, shortly before he died, they capture the same playful warmth and quiet rhythmic assurance that marked all his work. These aren't qualities especially well-served by youth, which is one reason Hurt exerted instant artistic authority when he was rediscovered in 1963 at age seventy-one. From 'Funky Butt' to 'Shortnin' Bread,' this is a man who was always ready to meet his maker.

The record was later regarded by Christgau as "one of those nearness-of-death albums", along with Bob Dylan's Time Out of Mind (1997), Warren Zevon's The Wind (2003), Neil Young's Prairie Wind (2005), and Johnny Cash's American VI: Ain't No Grave (2010). In The New Rolling Stone Record Guide (1983), Dave Marsh reviewed Last Sessions within the context of Hurt's late-period music; while he had "lost some technical ability due to age" and "wheezes and rattles, clearly on his last legs", the album "does not surrender his marvelous spirit".

== Track listing ==
Last Sessions track listing
No.	Title	Length
1.	"Poor Boy, Long Ways From Home"	2:12
2.	"Boys, You're Welcome"	3:00
3.	"Joe Turner Blues"	3:30
4.	"First Shot Missed Him"	1:40
5.	"Farther Along"	3:43
6.	"Funky Butt"	1:55
7.	"Spider, Spider"	1:25
8.	"Waiting for You"	3:28
9.	"Shortnin' Bread"	2:13
10.	"Trouble, I've Had It All My Days"	3:02
11.	"Let The Mermaids Flirt With Me"	3:20
12.	"Good Morning, Carrie"	1:58
13.	"Nobody Cares for Me"	3:42
14.	"All Night Long"	2:44
15.	"Hey, Honey, Right Away"	1:58
16.	"You've Got to Die"	3:28
17.	"Goodnight, Irene"	2:26
Total length:		45:44
