= Mississippi John Hurt =

American singer and guitarist (1893–1966)

- Hurt photographed by Bernard Gotfryd in 1965

Background information
- Born: John Smith Hurt; March 8, 1893; Teoc, Mississippi, U.S.
- Origin: Avalon, Mississippi, U.S.
- Died: November 2, 1966 (aged 73) Grenada, Mississippi, U.S.
- Genres: Country blues; delta blues; folk
- Occupations: Musician; songwriter
- Instruments: Guitar; vocals
- Years active: 1901–1966
- Label: Okeh (later Columbia, then Sony), Vanguard

John Smith Hurt (March 8, 1893 (Note: There is uncertainty about his date of birth. March 8, 1893, is the date written in his family's Bible and accepted by his biographer Philip Ratcliffe and by the researchers Bob Eagle and Eric LeBlanc as the most likely. Other possible dates include March 3, 1892 (shown on his gravestone); March 8, 1892; March 16, 1892; July 2, 1892; July 3, 1893; and May 5, 1895.) – November 2, 1966), known as Mississippi John Hurt, was an American country blues singer, songwriter, and guitarist.

== Biography ==
=== Early years ===
John Hurt was born in Teoc, Carroll County, Mississippi and raised in Avalon, Mississippi. His parents, Isom and Mary, had both been slaves and as was common after the Civil War, they continued working on the same plantation, now as sharecroppers, for the same owner.

John taught himself to play guitar at the age of nine. To earn extra money, his mother took in boarders. One of them, William Henry Carson, who played a guitar and was a friend of John's mother, often stayed at the Hurt home while courting a woman who lived nearby. When no one was around, John would play Carson's guitar. As a youth, he played old-time music for friends and at dances or at the local general store. His syncopated playing style was ideal for dancing.

He worked as a farmhand and sharecropper, sometimes working for the railroad into the 1920s. On occasion, a medicine show came through the area. Hurt recalled that one wanted to hire him: "One of them wanted me, but I said no because I just never wanted to get away from home."

=== First recordings ===
In 1923, he played with the fiddle player Willie Narmour as a substitute for Narmour's regular partner, Shell Smith. When Narmour won first place in a fiddle contest in 1928 and got a chance to record for Okeh Records, he recommended Hurt, who by that time had a good reputation, to Okeh producer Tommy Rockwell. After auditioning "Monday Morning Blues" at his home, Hurt took part in two recording sessions where he recorded 20 songs, in Memphis and New York City. While in Memphis, he recalled seeing "many, many blues singers ... Lonnie Johnson, Blind Lemon Jefferson, Bessie Smith, and lots, lots more." Hurt described his first recording session:

... a great big hall with only the three of us in it: me, the man [Rockwell], and the engineer. It was really something. I sat on a chair, and they pushed the microphone right up to my mouth and told me that I couldn't move after they had found the right position. I had to keep my head absolutely still. Oh, I was nervous, and my neck was sore for days after.

The records sold modestly well, not only with the black community but also among southern whites. Hurt attempted further negotiations with Okeh to record again but Okeh declined since his record sales were only modest. Okeh went out of business during the Great Depression, and Hurt returned to Avalon and obscurity, working as a sharecropper and playing at local parties and dances.

=== Rediscovery and death ===
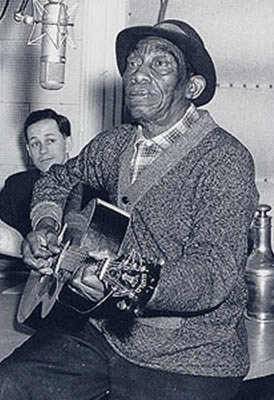
Hurt recording for the Library of Congress in July 1963

In 1952, musicologist Harry Smith included John's version of "Frankie and Johnny" and "Spike Driver Blues" in his seminal collection The Anthology of American Folk Music which generated considerable interest in locating him. When a copy of his "Avalon Blues" was discovered in 1963, it led musicologist Dick Spottswood to locate Avalon, Mississippi on a map and ask his friend, Tom Hoskins, who was traveling that way, to enquire after Hurt.

Avalon, my home town, always on my mind / Avalon, my home town.

— Mississippi John Hurt, "Avalon Blues"

Upon locating Hurt, Hoskins persuaded him to perform several songs, to ensure that he was genuine. Hoskins was convinced and, seeing that Hurt's guitar playing skills were still intact, encouraged him to move to Washington, D.C., and perform for a broader audience. Early in 1963 Hurt recorded an album, Folk Songs and Blues, that was released in August 1963 through Piedmont Records.

This added to the American folk music revival which was blooming at that time and inspired the search for and the rediscovery of many other bluesmen of Hurt's era such as Son House, Skip James, Bukka White, Mance Lipscomb and Lightnin' Hopkins. Hurt performed on the festival, university and coffeehouse concert circuits with other Delta blues musicians who were brought out of retirement. His performances in 1963 at the Newport Folk Festival and the Philadelphia Folk Festival caused his star to rise. In 1964, he recorded live for radio station WTBS-FM In Cambridge, Massachusetts as did Skip James.

For three years, Hurt performed extensively at colleges, concert halls, and coffeehouses, appearing on The Tonight Show Starring Johnny Carson, on Pete Seeger's public TV show, Rainbow Quest alongside Hedy West and Paul Cadwell and had a write up in Time. He also recorded three albums for Vanguard Records. Much of his repertoire was also recorded for the Library of Congress. His fans particularly liked the ragtime songs "Salty Dog", "Candy Man" and the blues ballads "Spike Driver Blues" (a variant of "John Henry") and "Frankie".

Hurt's influence spanned several music genres including blues, spirituals, country, bluegrass, folk, and contemporary rock and roll. A soft-spoken man, his nature reflected his work which was a mellow mix of country, blues, and old-time music.

Mississippi John Hurt made his last recordings at a hotel in New York City in February and July of 1966, though they were not released until 1972 on the Vanguard LP Last Sessions. He died of a heart attack on November 2, 1966 at a hospital in Grenada, Mississippi.

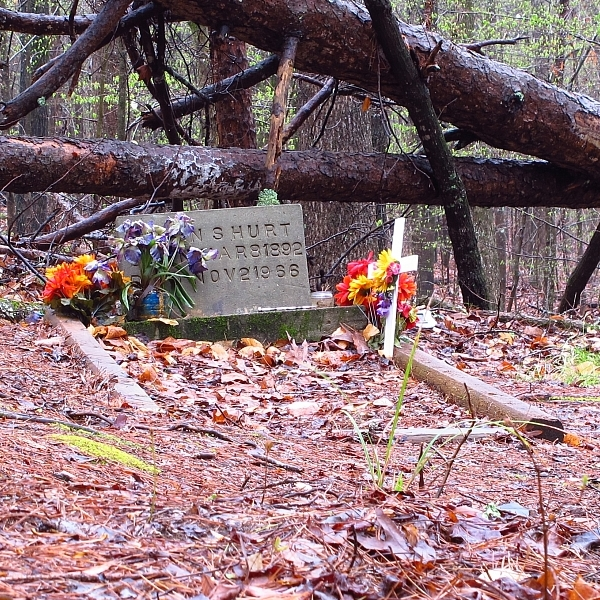
Hurt's grave

Several record labels recorded his songs. They have been covered by Bob Dylan, Dave Van Ronk, Jerry Garcia, Beck, Doc Watson, John McCutcheon, Taj Mahal, Bruce Cockburn, David Johansen, Bill Morrissey, Gillian Welch, The Be Good Tanyas, Josh Ritter, Chris Smither, Guthrie Thomas, Parsonsfield, and Rory Block among others.

== Style ==
Hurt used a syncopated finger picking style of guitar playing that he taught himself. He was influenced by few other musicians, among them was Rufus Hanks, an elderly, unrecorded blues singer from the Avalon area who played twelve-string guitar and harmonica.

According to the music critic Robert Christgau, "the school of John Fahey proceeded from his finger picking and while he's not the only quietly conversational singer in the modern folk tradition, no one else has talked the blues with such delicacy or restraint."

== Tributes ==
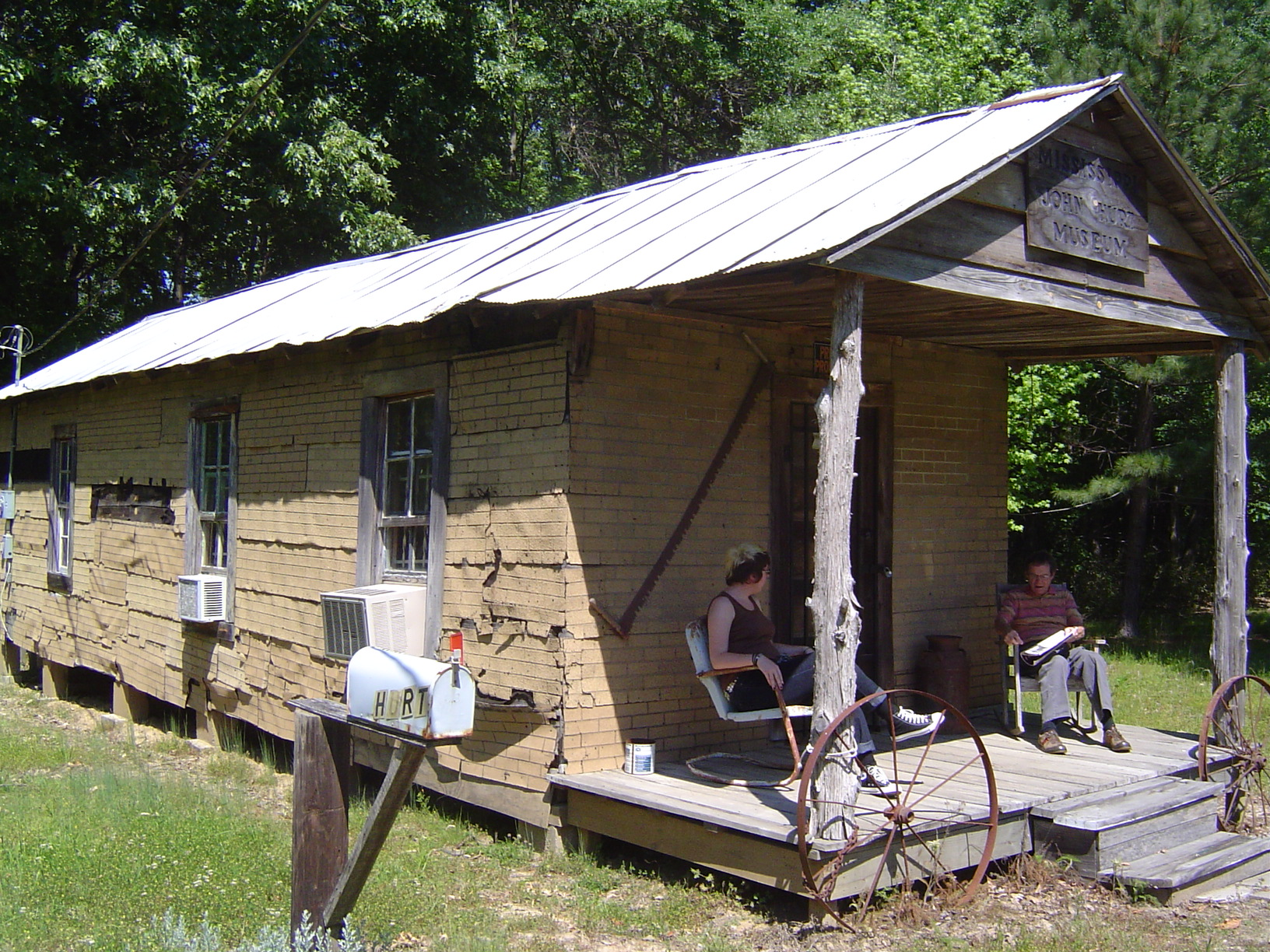
Mississippi John Hurt Museum, in Avalon, Mississippi

There was a memorial and museum dedicated to Hurt in Avalon, Mississippi, parallel to Rural Route 2, the rural road he grew up on. On February 20, 2024, it was destroyed in a fire the day after being made a National Landmark. Arson is not suspected.

The folk-rock band The Lovin' Spoonful took their name from a recurring phrase in Hurt's song "Coffee Blues".

The singer-songwriter Tom Paxton, who met Hurt and played on the same bill with him at the Gaslight in Greenwich Village around 1963, wrote and recorded a song about him in 1977, "Did You Hear John Hurt?".

The first track of John Fahey's 1968 solo acoustic guitar album Requia is "Requiem for John Hurt". Fahey's posthumous live album, The Great Santa Barbara Oil Slick, also features a version of the piece, entitled "Requiem for Mississippi John Hurt".

Norman Greenbaum's eclectic minor hit, "Gondoliers, Shakespeares, Overseers, Playboys And Bums" refers to Mississippi John Hurt singing the blues.

The British folk and blues artist Wizz Jones recorded a tribute song, "Mississippi John", for his 1977 album Magical Flight.

The Delta blues artist Rory Block recorded the album Avalon: A Tribute to Mississippi John Hurt, released in 2013 as part of her "Mentor Series".

The New England singer-songwriter Bill Morrissey released the Grammy-nominated album Songs of Mississippi John Hurt in 1999.

In 2017, Hurt's life story was told in the documentary series American Epic. The film featured footage of Hurt performing and being interviewed, and improved restorations of his 1920s recordings. Director Bernard MacMahon stated that Hurt "was the inspiration for American Epic". Hurt's life was profiled in the accompanying book, American Epic: The First Time America Heard Itself.

In 2023, Rolling Stone ranked Hurt at number 159 on its list of the 200 Greatest Singers of All Time.

In 2019, the Killer Blues Headstone Project placed a stone for Hurt at the family plot in Avalon.

== Discography ==
Stefan Wirtz's in depth, illustrated discography

Dixon, Robert M., Goodrich, John W. and Rye, Howard - Blues and Gospel Records, 1890-1943, Fourth Edition

AllMusic discography

=== 78 rpm releases ===
- "Frankie" / "Nobody's Dirty Business" (Okeh Records, Okeh 8560), 1928
- "Stack O' Lee" / "Candy Man Blues" (Okeh Records, OKeh 8654), 1928
- "Blessed Be the Name" / "Praying on the Old Camp Ground" (Okeh Records, OKeh 8666), 1928
- "Blue Harvest Blues" / "Spike Driver Blues" (Okeh Records, OKeh 8692), 1928
- "Louis Collins" / "Got the Blues (Can't Be Satisfied)" (Okeh Records, OKeh 8724), 1928
- "Ain't No Tellin'" / "Avalon Blues" (Okeh Records, OKeh 8759), 1928

=== Later career albums ===
- Folk Songs and Blues (Piedmont Records, PLP 13157), 1963
- Worried Blues, live recordings (Piedmont Records, PLP 13161), 1964
- Today! (Vanguard Records, VSD-79220), 1966
- The Immortal Mississippi John Hurt (Vanguard Records, VSD-79248), 1967
- The Best of Mississippi John Hurt, live recording from Oberlin College, April 15, 1965 (Vanguard Records, VSD-19/20), 1970
- Last Sessions (Vanguard Records, VSD-79327), 1972
- Volume One of a Legacy, live recordings (Piedmont Records, CLPS 1068), 1975
- Monday Morning Blues: The Library of Congress Recordings, vol. 1 (Flyright Records, FLYLP 553), 1980
- Avalon Blues: The Library of Congress Recordings, vol. 2 (Heritage Records, HT-301), 1982
- Satisfied, live recordings (Quicksilver Intermedia, QS 5007), 1982
- The Candy Man, live recordings (Quicksilver Intermedia, QS 5042), 1982
- Sacred and Secular: The Library of Congress Recordings, vol. 3 (Heritage Records, HT-320), 1988
- Avalon Blues (Flyright Records, FLYCD 06), 1989
- Memorial Anthology, live recordings (Genes Records, GCD 9906/7), 1993
- Rediscovered (Vanguard Records, CD 79519), 1998
- The Complete Recordings (Vanguard Records, CD 70181–2), 1998

=== Selected pre-war albums ===
- The Original 1928 Recordings (Spokane Records SPL 1001) 1971
- 1928: Stack O' Lee Blues – His First Recordings (Biograph Records BLP C4) 1972
- 1928 Sessions (Yazoo Records L 1065) 1979
- Satisfying Blues (Collectables Records VCL 5529) 1995
- Avalon Blues: The Complete 1928 Okeh Recordings (Columbia Records CK64986) 1996
- Candy Man Blues: The Complete 1928 Sessions (Snapper Music SBLUECD 010) 2004
- American Epic: The Best of Mississippi John Hurt (Lo-Max / Sony Legacy / Third Man, TMR-459) 2017
- MISSISSIPPI JOHN HURT - The Man From Avalon Pristine PABL004, pitch corrected, 13 tracks including one unissued track.
