= Piedmont Records =

American independent record label

Piedmont Records is an American independent record label, set up in the early 1960s by Dick Spottswood.

Piedmont Records issued - among others - the first recordings after their 'rediscovery' of Mississippi John Hurt and Robert Wilkins.

== See also ==
- List of record labels
