= Avalon, Mississippi =

- Unincorporated community
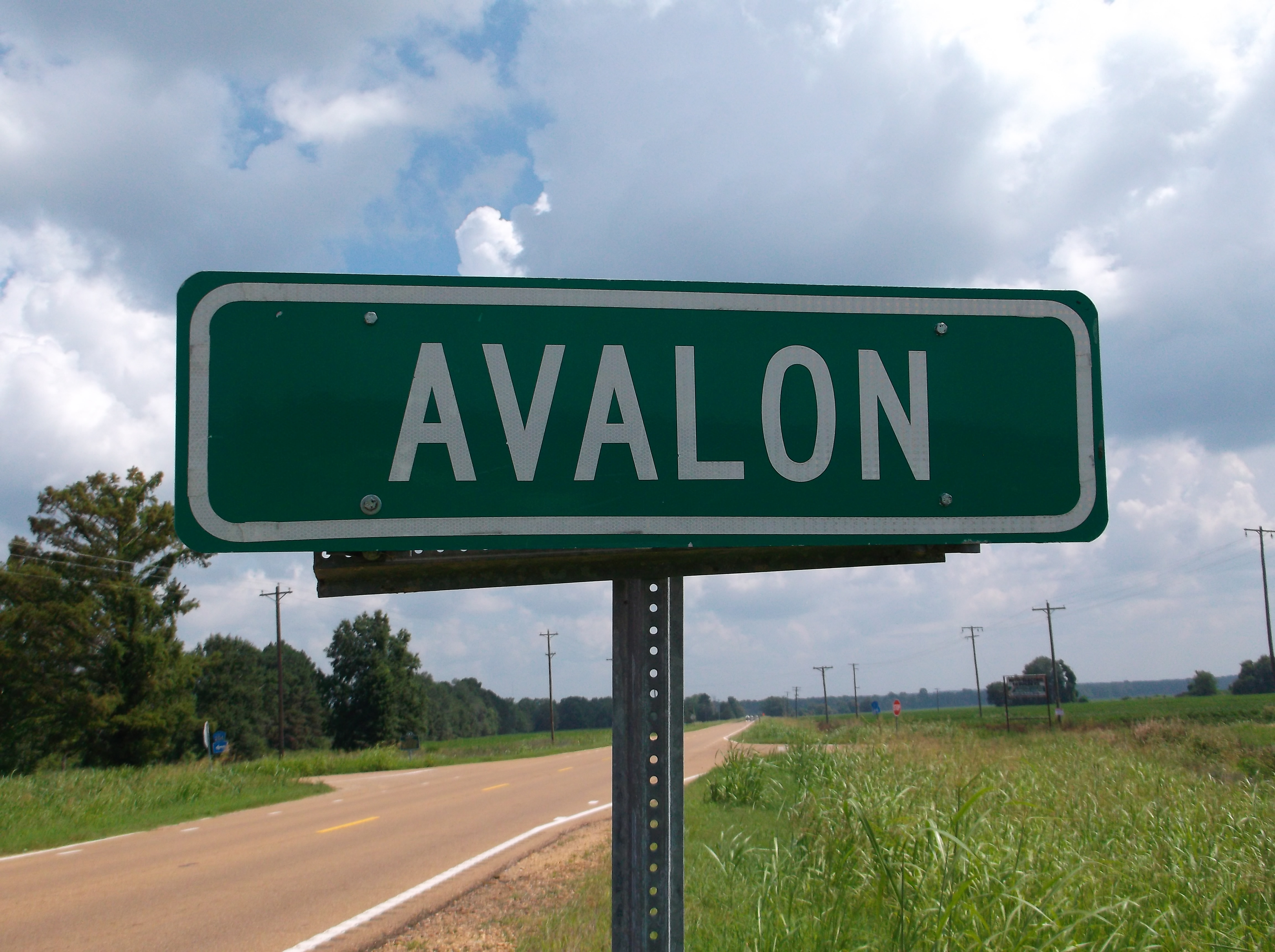
- Highway sign located just outside of Avalon

- Location within Mississippi Location within the United States
- Coordinates: 33°39′18″N 90°05′08″W
- Country: United States
- State: Mississippi
- County: Carroll
- Elevation: 132 ft (40 m)
- Time zone: UTC-6 (Central (CST))
  - Summer (DST): UTC-5 (CDT)
- Area code: 662
- GNIS feature ID: 666432

Avalon is an unincorporated community in Carroll County, Mississippi, United States. Avalon is located on the former Yazoo and Mississippi Valley Railroad and was at one time home to a general store. A post office first began operation under the name Avalon in 1908.

Mississippi John Hurt, an African-American blues musician, was raised and lived here most of his life. His shotgun house was preserved as a museum to honor him and it occasionally hosted blues and gospel festivals on the adjacent land. In 2024, the building was destroyed in a fire.

Carroll County has placed a highway marker at Avalon to commemorate Hurt and his music. It is part of the Mississippi Blues Trail.Dardanelle Hadley, a jazz pianist, vibraphonist, and singer, was born in Avalon.

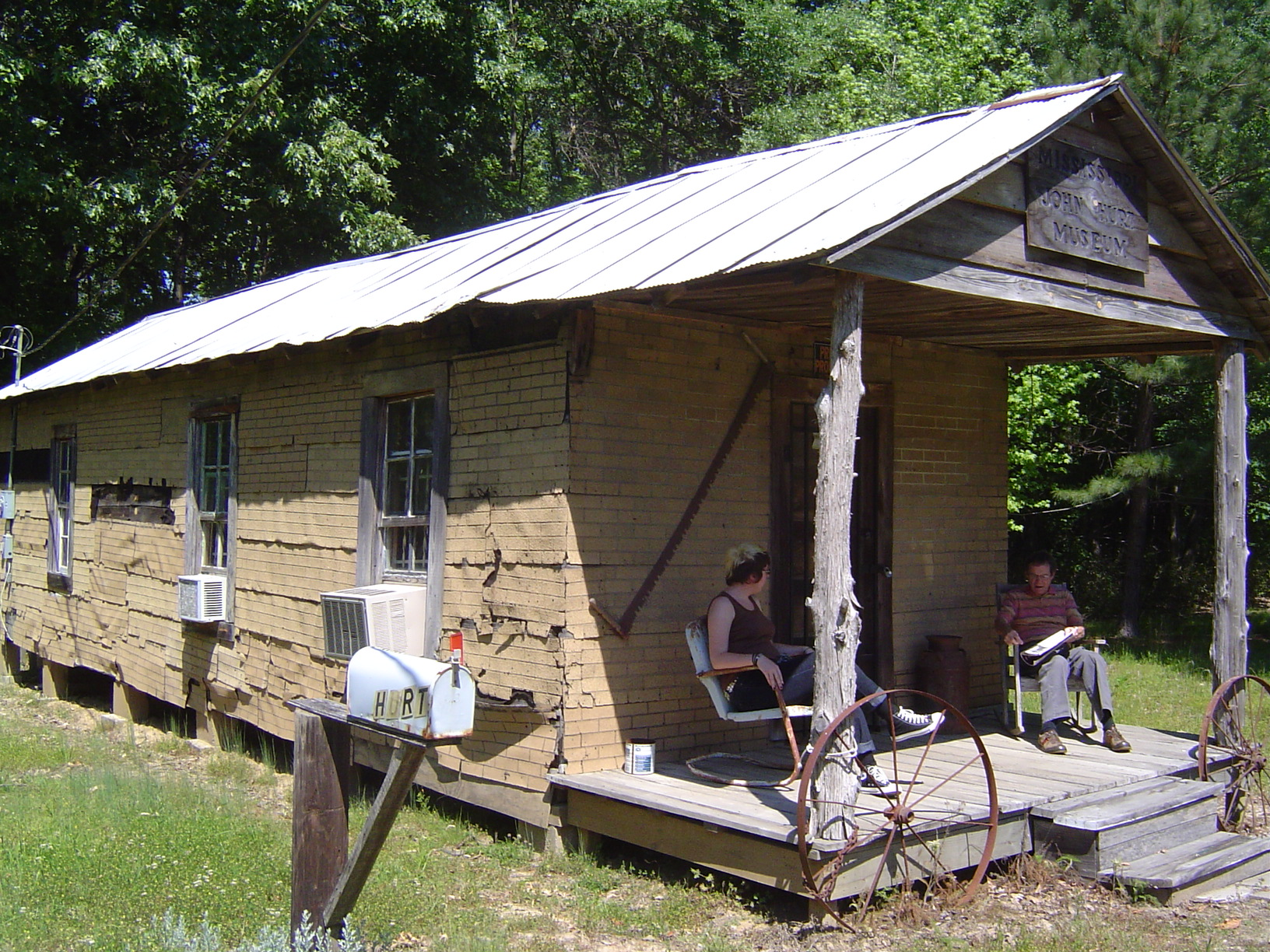
John Hurt Museum

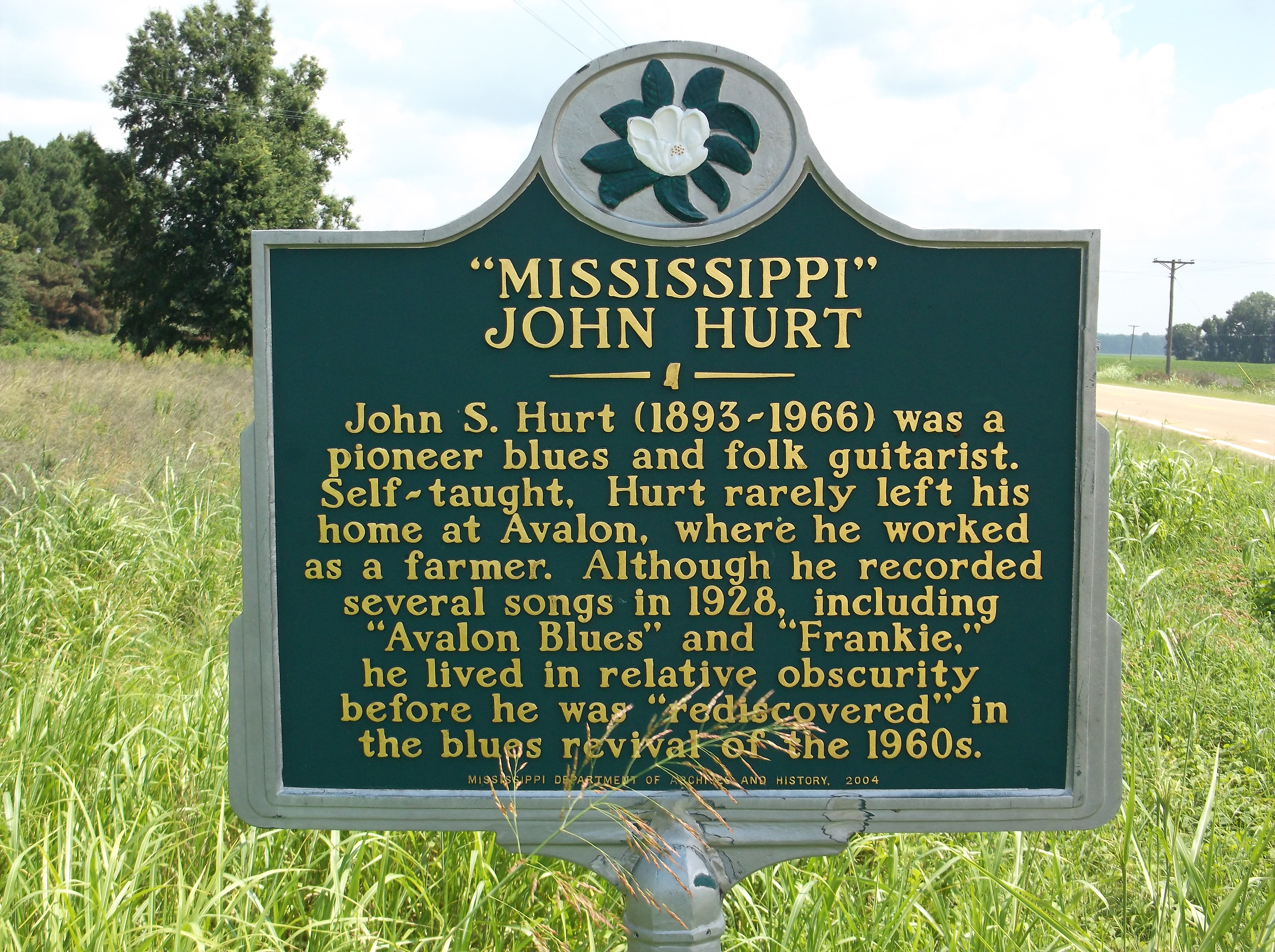
Mississippi John Hurt Mississippi Blues Trail Marker
