= Richard K. Spottswood =

American musicologist and author (born 1937)

Richard K. "Dick" Spottswood
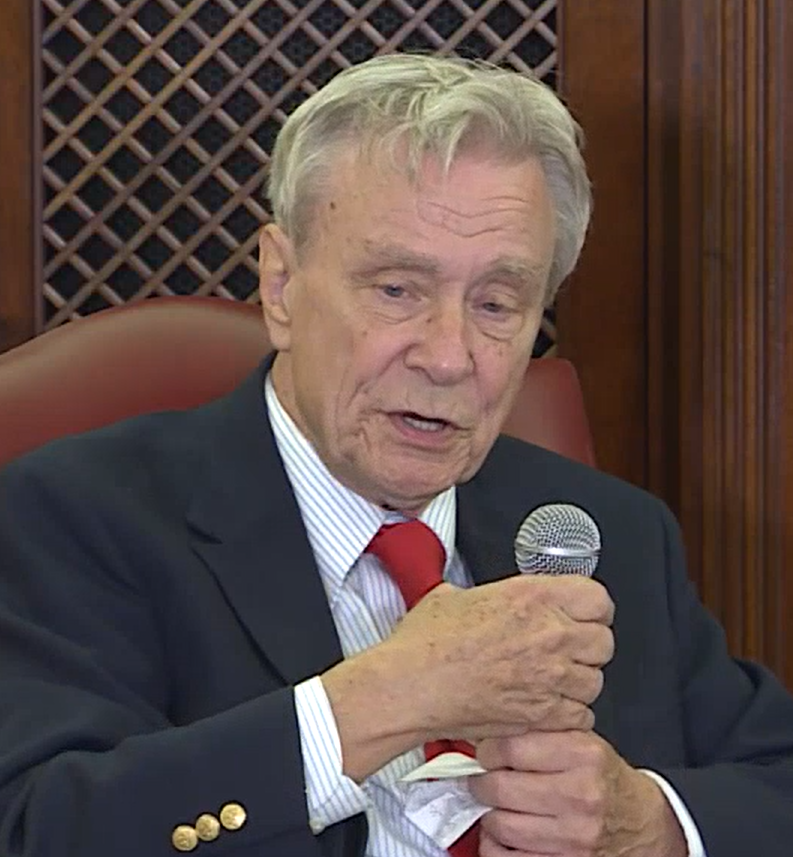
- Born: Richard K. Spottswood; April 17, 1937 (age 89); Washington, D.C., U.S.

Richard K. "Dick" Spottswood (born April 17, 1937) is an American musicologist and author from Maryland who has catalogued and been responsible for the reissue of many thousands of recordings of vernacular music in the United States.

== Biography ==
Spottswood was born in 1937 in Washington, D.C., where his father worked for The Chesapeake and Potomac Telephone Company. From an early age, he was interested in music with a particular interest in early jazz, country, blues, and gospel. When he was a teenager, around 1953 or 1954, he first heard a recording of "Foggy Mountain Breakdown" and immediately was attracted to bluegrass music.

Spottswood earned his B.A. from the University of Maryland in 1960, and his Master's degree in Library Science from Catholic University in 1962. The title of his Master's thesis was A catalog of American folk music on commercial recordings at the Library of Congress, 1923-1940. His masterwork, Ethnic Music on Records: A Discography of Ethnic Recordings Produced in the United States, 1893-1942 (University of Illinois Press, 1990), is a seven-volume listing of sound recordings by foreign language and minority groups issued in the U.S. until 1942. He also edited and annotated the 15-volume LP series Folk Music in America for the Library of Congress, and contributed to books including Country Music Sources: A Biblio-Discography of Commercially Recorded Traditional Music (2002) and contributed the essay "Caribbean and South American Recordings" to Lost Sounds: Blacks and the Birth of the Recording Industry, 1890-1919.

Spottswood has contributed to hundreds of reissue recordings issued by companies like Arhoolie, Rounder, Herwin, Yazoo, Document, Biograph, Revenant and Dust-to-Digital, and his own Melodeon and Piedmont labels. John Fahey, in his book How Bluegrass Music Destroyed My Life, credited a record canvassing trip with Spottswood, and the Bill Monroe record "Blue Yodel Number Seven" which Spottswood played him subsequently, with altering the course of his life.

Spottswood hosts a two-hour program called "The Dick Spottswood Show" on Bluegrass Country radio WAMU 88.5 HD-2 in Washington, D.C., and streaming online. He is an expert on bluegrass music (having co-founded Bluegrass Unlimited magazine in 1966) and on the history of recorded ethnic music of the early 20th century generally. Spottswood is a founding member of the Association for Recorded Sound Collections, and was awarded their Lifetime Achievement Award in 2003. On October 1, 2009, the International Bluegrass Music Association presented Spottswood with their Distinguished Service Award in Nashville, Tennessee. He appears briefly in the PBS documentary American Epic (2017).

On May 14, 2019, Spottswood appeared in a symposium at the Library of Congress celebrating his career.

A resident of Naples, Florida, Spottswood has emceed bluegrass concerts for the Acoustic Music Society of Southwest Florida at the Alliance for the Arts in Fort Myers, as well as the Bluegrass Jamboree in Cape Coral.

== Bibliography ==
=== Main works ===
- Banjo On the Mountain: Wade Mainer's First Hundred Years (University Press of Mississippi, 2010).
- The Blue Sky Boys (University Press of Mississippi, 2018).
- Country Music Sources (with Meade & Meade) (John Edwards Memorial Forum and University of North Carolina Press, 2002). Recipient, ARSC Award for Excellence
- Ethnic Music on Records (7 vols.) (University of Illinois, 1990). Recipient, ARSC Award for Excellence, 1991. Revised edition in progress.
- Folk Music in America, Vols. 1-15 (Library of Congress, 1976–78). Annotated, illustrated fifteen record anthology, prepared for the American Bicentennial.
- West Indian Rhythm (with Cowley, Hill et al.) (Bear Family, 2006). Book with ten compact discs.

=== Other works ===
- “Alan Lomax” (obituary), Bluegrass Unlimited, September 2002, 21.
- “Bill and Ted's Excellent Discography,” VJM's Jazz & Blues Mart 151 (Autumn 2008), 5–6.
- “Bill Monroe—An Appreciation,” Bluegrass Unlimited, January 1997, 16.
- “Bill Monroe—Blue Moon of Kentucky,” Bluegrass Unlimited, June 2003, 81.
- “The Birth of the Blast,” Guitar Player, April 1995, 63–69.
- “Buzz Busby” (obituary), Bluegrass Unlimited, March 2003, 16.
- “Caribbean and South American Recordings,” in Lost Sounds (by Tim Brooks). University of Illinois Press, 2004, 522–530.
- “Columbia Records C Series,” 1908–1923, 2017, www.recordingpioneers.com.
- “Columbia Records E Series,” 1908–1923, 2017, www.recordingpioneers.com.
- “The Commercial Recordings of Charlie Monroe,” Bluegrass Unlimited, May 1969, 3–6.
- “The Curious Ancestry of ‘Midnight on the Stormy Deep’,” Bluegrass Unlimited, July 2012, 44-45.
- “David Medoff: A Case Study in Interethnic Popular Culture,” American Music, vol. 3, no. 2 (Autumn 1985), 261-276 (with Mark Slobin)
- “Earl Scruggs and the Sound of Genius,” Bluegrass Unlimited, June 2012, 26–32
- The Encyclopedia of Country Music (Oxford, 1998, 2d ed., 2012) (Several articles)
- The Encyclopedia of the Blues (Routledge, 2006) (Several articles)
- “Ethnic Music and Popular Style in America,” in Folk Music and Modern Sound, edited by William Ferris and Mary L. Hart, University Press of Mississippi, 1982, 60–70.
- “Forty Years and Counting,” Bluegrass Unlimited, July 2006, 42–44
- “Further Notes on 'Orange Blossom Special',” Bluegrass Unlimited, September 2008, 10–11
- “Guitar on 78s and Cylinders: A Survey of Pioneering Efforts,” Victrola and 78 Journal, Winter 1996, 11–17
- “The Gouge,” in Annual Review of Jazz Studies 12 [2002]. Scarecrow Press, 2004, 135–145
- “Gouges, Vamps, Zulus and Scronches[,] and Where They’ve Been Hiding,” VJM's Jazz & Blues Mart 115 (Autumn 1999), 3–4.
- “Gouges, Vamps, Zulus and Scronches[,] and Where They’ve Been Hiding, Part Two” VJM's Jazz & Blues Mart 116 (Winter 1999), 4–5.
- “Hobart Smith: In Sacred Trust,” Banjo Newsletter, vol. 33, no. 1 (November 2005), 10–14
- “’In the Hills of Roane County’: The Story and the Song,” Bluegrass Unlimited, vol. 50, no. 9 (July 2016), 46-47.
- “John Duffey” (obituary), Bluegrass Unlimited (November 1996), 16
- “John Duffey Takes No Prisoners,” Bluegrass Unlimited (July 2006), 48
- “Lonnie Johnson—The Gennett Mystery Revealed at Last,” Joslin's Jazz Journal, vol. 20, no. 2 (May 2001), 4. Revised version in Starr Gennett News, vol. VIII, issue II (Spring 2010).
- “OKeh Mysteries – Blue Labels and Beyond,” VJM's Jazz & Blues Mart 153 (Spring 2009), 6.
- “Old-Time Music and Copyright Laws” (with Tim Brooks), Old-Time Herald, vol. 11, no. 12 (September 2009), 8–10.
- “Rich-R’-Tone, Mutual and Blue Ridge: Histories and Inventories” (with David Sax and Pete Kuykendall), Bluegrass Unlimited, February 2005, 24–33.
- “We Ain’t ‘Fraid Nobody: Decca Calypsos in the 1930s,” ARSC Journal, vol. 31, no. 2 (Fall 2000), 224–243.
- “When the Wolf Knocked on Victor’s Door,” 78 Quarterly, vol. 1, no. 5 (1990), 64–77.
- “Women and the Blues,” in Nothing But the Blues (Lawrence Cohn, ed.). Abbeville, 1994, 87–105.

== Compact discs ==
- The Ace & Deuce of Pipering, Heritage 21, 1993.
- Alphonse “Bois Sec” Ardoin: La Musique Créole, Arhoolie 445, 1996.
- The Bailes Brothers: Remember Me, Bear Family BCD 17132, 2012
- The Bailes Brothers: Standing Somewhere In the Shadows, Bear Family BCD 17133, 2012
- The Best of Lucille Bogan, Columbia Legacy CK 65705, 2004.
- Bill Monroe & the Blue Grass Boys, Castle Studio 1950–1951, Complete Sessions, RWA ACD 12522, 2017.
- Bob Wills: Liza, Pull Down the Shades, Rounder 1147 (not published)
- Bob Wills: Stay a Little Longer, Rounder 1146, 2001.
- Bob Wills: Take Me Back to Tulsa¸ Rounder 1145, 2001.
- Classic Ragtime, RCA Victor 09026 65206–2, 1998.
- The Country Gentlemen, Rebel 7508, 2003.
- Fire in the Mountains, Vols. 1 and 2, Yazoo 7012, 7013, 1997.
- Frank Hovington: Gone With the Wind, Flyright 66, 2000.
- From Galway to Dublin (Traditional Irish Music), Rounder 1087, 1993.
- Italian String Virtuosi, Rounder 1095, 1995.
- Jimmy Murphy: Electricity, Sugar Hill 3890, 1999.
- Joseph Moskowitz: The Art of the Cymbalom, Rounder 1126, 1996.
- Klezmer Pioneers: European and American Recordings, 1905–1952, Rounder 1089, 1993.
- Milestone at the Garden (Irish Fiddle Masters), Rounder 1123, 1996.
- Mississippi Fred McDowell, Rounder 2138, 1995.
- Mississippi John Hurt: Avalon Blues, Flyright 06, 1989.
- Mississippi John Hurt: D.C. Blues, Fuel 2000 302 061 407 2, 2004.
- Mississippi John Hurt: D.C. Blues Vol. 2, Fuel 2000 302 061 495 2, 2004.
- Naftule Brandwein—King of the Klezmer Clarinet, Rounder 1127, 1997.
- Polish Village Music 1927–1933, Arhoolie Folklyric 7031, 1995.
- Portuguese String Music 1908–1931, Heritage 05, 1989.
- Rain Dropping on the Banana Tree, Rounder 1125, 1996.
- Raw Fiddle, Rounder Select 82161–1160–2, 2004.
- Rembetica: Historic Urban Folk Songs from Greece, Rounder 1079, 1992.
- Sacred Voices: An A Capella Gospel Collection, Sugar Hill 3898, 2001.
- Skip James/Greatest of the Delta Blues Singers, Biograph 122, 1992.
- The Slide Guitar, Columbia Legacy CK 46218, 1990.
- Squeeze Play: A World Accordion Anthology, Rounder 1090, 1997.
- Strange Creek Singers, Arhoolie 9003, 1997.
- Train 45: Railroad Songs of the Early 1900s, Rounder 1143, 1996.
- Ukrainian Village Music, Arhoolie Folklyric 7030, 1994.
- Vintage Music from India, Rounder 1083, 1993.
- Wade Mainer/I'm Not Looking Backward, Gusto GT2-0957-2, 2006.
- A Warrior on the Battlefield: A Capella Trail Blazers, 1920s-1940s, Rounder 1137, 1997.

=== Masters of Turkish Music compact discs (with Karl Signell and Munir Beken) ===
- Masters of Turkish Music, Rounder 1051, 1990.
- Masters of Turkish Music, Volume 2, Rounder 1111, 1996.
- Haydar Haydar—Masters of Turkish Music, Rounder 821611–1140–2, 2003.

=== Calypso and Caribbean compact discs ===
- Calypso Breakaway, 1927–1941, Rounder 1054, 1990.
- Calypso Carnival, 1936–1941, Rounder 1077, 1993.
- Calypso Ladies, Heritage 06, 1991.
- Calypso Pioneers, 1912–1937, Rounder 1039, 1989.
- Calypsos from Trinidad: Politics, Intrigue & Violence in the 1930s, Arhoolie Folklyric 7004, 1991.
- The Cuban Danzón: Before There Was Jazz, 1906–1929, Arhoolie Folklyric 7032, 1999.
- Fall of Man: Calypsos on the Human Condition, 1935–1941, Rounder 1141, 1999.
- History of Carnival, Matchbox 301–2, 1993.
- Hot Music from Cuba 1907–1937, Harlequin 23, 1993.
- Lovey's Original Trinidad String Band, Calypso Dawn, 1912. Bear Family BCD 16057, 2012
- Martinique: “Au Bal Antillais” Franco-Créole Biguines, Arhoolie Folklyric 7013, 1992.
- The Music of Cuba 1909–1951, Columbia Legacy CK 62234, 2000.
- The Music of Puerto Rico, Harlequin 22, 1992.
- Roosevelt in Trinidad: Calypsos 1933–39, Rounder 1142, 1999.
- Shango, Shouter and Obeah, Rounder 1107, 2001.
- Trinidad Loves to Play Carnival 1914–1939, Matchbox 302–2, 1993.
- Trinidad 1912–1941, Harlequin 16, 1992.
- West Indian Rhythm, Bear Family BCD 16623, 2006. ARSC Award, 2007

=== Book and compact disc sets ===
- Charlie Monroe: I'm Old Kentucky Bound (Bear Family, 2007). Book with four compact discs. Winner, Award for Excellence in Historical Recorded Sound Research, Association for Recorded Sound Collections, 2008.
- Harry Smith's Anthology of American Folk Music, Volume Four (with Marcus, Fahey et al.). Revenant 211 (book with two compact discs), 2000.
- How Low Can You Go? (Dust to Digital, 2006). Book with three compact discs.
- Ralph Stanley and the Clinch Mountain Boys, 1971–1973. Rebel, 1995. Booklet with four compact discs.
- Screamin’ and Hollerin’ the Blues: The Worlds of Charley Patton (with Evans, Fahey, Komara et al.). Revenant 212 (book with seven compact discs), 2001. Winner, ARSC Award for Excellence 2002.
- West Indian Rhythm (with Cowley, Hill et al.) (Bear Family, 2006). Book with ten compact discs.
