= Sonny Scott =

American singer

- Born: Alabama, U.S.
- Genres: Country blues
- Occupations: Guitarist, singer, songwriter
- Instruments: Guitar, vocals
- Years active: 1933 (recordings)
- Labels: Vocalion Records, Melotone Records

Sonny Scott was an American country blues guitarist, singer and songwriter, primarily noted for his association with Walter Roland and Lucille Bogan. In 1933, Scott recorded seventeen tracks in his own name, although only twelve were released at the time. AllMusic noted that his vocal and guitar styling was similar to Ed Bell, Blind Boy Fuller, Curley Weaver, Furry Lewis, and Buddy Moss.

Information is minimal on Scott's life outside of his recording career.

== Biography ==
There are various sources that concluded Scott must have been born in Alabama, United States, although blues historian, Don Kent, opined that Scott hailed from Mississippi, but operated in Birmingham, Alabama. Otherwise, no reliable sources have details of Scott's life prior to his recordings.

In July 1933, Scott traveled to New York City in the company of pianist and guitarist Walter Roland and the barrelhouse blues singer Lucille Bogan. Together they spent a few days recording in differing combinations. Bogan seemingly to conceal her identity, recorded as Bessie Jackson for the Banner label of American Record Corporation. Meanwhile, Roland recorded "Red Cross Blues", which is not to be confused with an identically titled tune by Walter Davis. That former track (variously "Red Cross Store Blues") was Roland's cynical viewpoint on welfare benefits. Sonny Scott then recorded his two versions of the song, using different lyrics on each, with some of them "borrowed" from Roland's effort. "Red Cross Blues" gradually gained more potency within the blues repertoire, through Scott's cover and subsequent recordings by Forest City Joe, Robert Nighthawk, Sonny Boy Williamson I, and Champion Jack Dupree.

In addition to providing guitar accompaniment to both Bogan and Roland, Scott recorded a total of seventeen known songs of his own between 19 and 20 July 1933. On all of these Scott was backed by Roland, who varied between mainly piano or less often guitar. Vocalion released the bulk of the tracks later that year on 10 inch shellac 78rpm records. Five songs – "Frisco Blues", "Overall Blues", "Man Man Man", "Black Horse Blues", and "Try Me Man Blues" – were not released at the time. Of those that were released, the liner notes for New Deal Blues, noted that Scott's composition "Fire-Wood Man" was a twelve-bar blues recorded in standard C tuning, while stating that "such philosophical observations as man having 'his mind filled with foolishness and his feets are made of clay' are not generally encountered in blues lyrics." Equally the liner notes for another compilation album, claimed Scott's version of "Red Cross Blues", was one of the least commercially successful. Few highway based blues songs were recorded in the 1920s and early 1930s, with Scott's "Highway No. 2 Blues" being one of the earliest. "Highway No. 2 Blues" refers to a road that crosses the Sipsey River north of Mantua, Alabama, approximately 20 miles southwest of Tuscaloosa. The highway in Greene County, Alabama, exists to the present day.

Four other tracks jointly recorded by Scott and Roland saw them issued under the names of the Jolly Two or the Jolly Jivers. Two instrumentals ("Guitar Stomp" and "Railroad Stomp"), billed on record as by the Jolly Two, had Roland match Scott's guitar work. "Jookit Jookit" and "Whatcha Gonna Do" when released were labelled as by the Jolly Jivers; the latter track having vocal encouragement from Bogan.

In 1992, Scott's complete work was issued on 1933, a 17-track disc released by the Story of the Blues. AllMusic noted that the set was "firmly rooted in the loam of west central Alabama." One track, "Black Horse Blues," represented by a vintage photograph on the album's sleeve, should not be confused with an identically titled Blind Lemon Jefferson song.

No details seem to exist of Scott's life after his recording sessions.

Good quality original discs of Scott's recordings are often worth over $300.

== Discography ==
=== Singles ===
| Year | Title (A-side / B-side) | Record label | | | |
|---|---|---|---|---|---|
| Year | Title (A-side / B-side) | Record label | 1933 | "Red Cross Blues" / "Coal Mountain Blues" | Vocalion (Vocalion 25012) |
| 1933 | "Early This Morning" / "Working Man's Moan" | Vocalion (Vocalion 25013) | | | |
| 1933 | "Naked Man Blues" / "Highway No. 2 Blues" | Vocalion (Vocalion 25016) | | | |
| 1933 | "Red Rooster Blues" / "Hard Luck Man" | Vocalion (Vocalion 25017) | | | |
| 1933 | "Rolling Water" / "No Good Biddie" | Vocalion (Vocalion 02533) | | | |
| 1933 | "Red Cross Blues No. 2" / "Fire-Wood Man" | Vocalion (Vocalion 02614) | | | |
| 1934 | "Red Cross Blues No. 2" / "No Good Biddie" § | Melotone (Melotone 13088) | | | |

§ - Credited jointly to Walter Roland and Sonny Scott

=== Selected compilation albums ===
| Album title | Record label | Year of release |
|---|---|---|
| Alabama Country Blues 1924-1933 | Roots Records | 1969 |
| New Deal Blues | Mamlish Records | 1971 |
| Sonny Scott (1933) | Story of the Blues | 1992 |
| Alabama & the East Coast | Document Records | 2000 |

== See also ==
- List of country blues musicians
