= R. Crumb and his Cheap Suit Serenaders No. 2 =

Studio album by R. Crumb & His Cheap Suit Serenaders
- Released: 1976
- Genre: String band, old-timey
- Length: 40:42
- Label: Blue Goose Records, Shanachie Records
- Producer: Nick Perls

R. Crumb & His Cheap Suit Serenaders chronology
R. Crumb and his Cheap Suit Serenaders (1974)	R. Crumb and his Cheap Suit Serenaders No. 2 (1976)	R. Crumb and his Cheap Suit Serenaders No. 3 [a.k.a. Singing In the Bathtub] (1978)

Professional ratings
Review scores
Source	Rating
Christgau's Record Guide	C+

R. Crumb and his Cheap Suit Serenaders Number 2 is the second 33⅓ rpm album by the retro string band R. Crumb & His Cheap Suit Serenaders and its subtitle was "Persian Rug, Crying My Blues Away, Moana March and Other Favorites". The album was later retitled Chasin' Rainbows in re-release on CD (Shanachie 6002, 1993 - ASIN: B000000DSO) from Shanachie Records. The band's personnel includes Robert Crumb on lead vocal and banjo, Allan Dodge on mandolin, violin, ukulele and vocals, Robert Armstrong on guitars, accordion, banjo, musical saw and vocals, Terry Zwigoff, who later produced the documentary Crumb, on cello. Originally released on Blue Goose Records in 1976, this record became a collectible not only for the whimsical string band renditions of and reminiscent of the early 20th century music, but for the cover art drawn by the band's frontman and well-known comics artist Robert Crumb.

== Track listing ==
=== Side A ===
1. "Alabama Jubilee" (George L. Cobb, Jack Yellen)
2. "Chasin' Rainbows" (Dallas String Band)
3. "Fine Artiste Blues" (Watts, Robert Armstrong, Allan Dodge)
4. "Hula Medley" (traditional)
5. "I Want A Little Girl" (Murray Mencher, Billy Moll)
6. "Persian Rug" (Moret, Kahn)

=== Side B ===
1. "Mysterious Mose" (Walter Doyle)
2. "Crying My Blues Away" (Albert Wynn, Punch Miller)
3. "She Lived Down By The Firehouse" (Pie Plant Pete real name Claude W. Moye.)
4. "Diane" (Rapee, Pollack)
5. "Make My Cot Where The Cot-Cot-Cotton Grows" (Jack LeSoir, Ray Doll, Robert Klein)
6. "Moana March" (Mosiello)

All arrangements by R. Crumb and his Cheap Suit Serenaders, copyright by Yellow Bee Music (BMI) - 1976.

== The band ==
- R.Crumb - vocals, banjo
- Allan Dodge - mandolin, violin, ukulele, vocals
- Robert Armstrong - guitar, resonator guitar, accordion, banjo, saw, vocals
- Terry Zwigoff - cello

=== Special guest appearances ===
- Irene Herrmann - bells (A5)
- Tom Marion - guitar (A1, B2), banjo & mandolin (B6)

Produced for Blue Goose Records, A division of Yellow Bee Productions by Nick Perls, founder of Blue Goose Records and Yazoo Records.
