= Blind Lemon Jefferson discography =

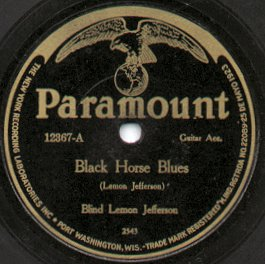
- Label of original 78-rpm single "Black Horse Blues"
- Singles: 79

This is a comprehensive discography of Blind Lemon Jefferson, who was an East Texas–born and Chicago-based Texas blues musician. He recorded 79 singles from 1925 to 1929. Jefferson was notable among blues musicians of his time for recording both spiritual and secular music, and he recorded both blues and ragtime songs.

== Singles ==
=== Spiritual singles ===
Year	Title
1925	"I Want to Be Like Jesus in My Heart"
1925	"All I Want Is That Pure Religion"
1927	"He Rose from the Dead"
1927	"Where Shall I Be?"

=== 1926 Blues singles ===
Year	Title
1926	"Got the Blues"
1926	"Long Lonesome Blues"
1926	"Booster Blues"
1926	"Dry Southern Blues"
1926	"Black Horse Blues"
1926	"Corinna Blues"
1926	"Got the Blues"
1926	"Jack O'Diamonds"
1926	"Chock House Blues"
1926	"Beggin' Back"
1926	"Old Rounders Blues"
1926	"Stocking Feet Blues"
1926	"That Black Snake Moan"
1926	"Wartime Blues"
1926	"Shuckin' Sugar Blues"
1926	"Booger Rooger Blues"
1926	"Rabbit Foot Blues"
1926	"Bad Luck Blues"

=== 1927 Blues singles ===
Year	Title
1927	"Black Snake Moan"
1927	"Match Box Blues"
1927	"Easy Rider Blues"
1927	"Rising High Water Blues"
1927	"Weary Dogs Blues"
1927	"Right of Way Blues"
1927	"Teddy Bear Blues (Take 2)"
1927	"Black Snake Dream Blues"
1927	"Hot Dogs"
1927	"Struck Sorrow Blues"
1927	"Rambler Blues"
1927	"Cinch Bug Blues"
1927	"Deceitful Brownskin Blues"
1927	"Sunshine Special"
1927	"Gone Dead on Your Blues"
1927	"See That My Grave Is Kept Clean"
1927	"One Dime Blues"
1927	"Lonesome House Blues"

=== 1928 Blues singles ===
Year	Title
1928	"Penitentiary Blues"
1928	"'Lectric Chair Blues"
1928	"Worried Blues"
1928	"Mean Jumper Blues"
1928	"Balky Mule Blues"
1928	"Change My Luck Blues"
1928	"Prison Cell Blues"
1928	"Cannon Ball Moan"
1928	"Long Lastin' Lovin'"
1928	"Piney Woods Money Mama"
1928	"Low Down Mojo Blues"
1928	"Competition Bed Blues"
1928	"Lock Step Blues"
1928	"Hangman's Blues"
1928	"Sad News Blues"
1928	"How Long How Long"
1928	"Christmas Eve Blues"
1928	"Happy New Year Blues"
1928	"Maltese Cat Blues"
1928	"D.B. Blues"

=== 1929 Blues singles ===
Year	Title
1929	"Eagle Eyed Mama"
1929	"Dynamite Blues"
1929	"Disgusted Blues"
1929	"Peach Orchard Mama"
1929	"Oil Well Blues"
1929	"Tin Cup Blues"
1929	"Saturday Night Spender Blues"
1929	"Black Snake Moan #2"
1929	"Bed Springs Blues"
1929	"Yo, Yo Blues"
1929	"Mosquito Moan"
1929	"Southern Woman Blues"
1929	"Bakershop Blues"
1929	"Pneumonia Blues"
1929	"Long Distance Moan"
1929	"That Crawlin' Baby Blues"
1929	"Fence Breakin' Yellin' Blues"
1929	"Cat Man Blues"
1929	"The Cheaters Spell"
1929	"Bootin' Me 'Bout"
