= Black Snake Moan =

Black Snake Moan may refer to:

- "That Black Snake Moan", a song recorded in 1927 by Blind Lemon Jefferson
- Black Snake Moan, a British blues band briefly fronted by Robert Plant of Led Zeppelin
- Black Snake Moan (film), a 2006 film directed by Craig Brewer starring Samuel L. Jackson and Christina Ricci
