= Don Kent (music historian) =

American blues historian (1944–2015)

Donald Theodore Kent (April 20, 1944 – August 9, 2015) was an American collector of blues and bluegrass recordings, a founder and owner of record labels (such as Mamlish Records, Country Turtle Records, and Flying Crow Records), and a much sought-after writer of liner notes not only on his own labels' issues but also on others', such as Yazoo Records. Many of the blues reissue albums of the 1960s and 1970s use 78-rpm records from his large collection.

Kent was born in Chicago, Illinois. He was employed as a social worker in the New York City Department of Social Services. In the 1960s he was a member of the so-called Blues Mafia in New York City, a group of blues enthusiasts, whose other members were Steve Calt (author of liner notes and books), Samuel Charters (RBF Records), Lawrence "Larry" Cohn (CBS/Epic, Columbia/Sony Records), John Fahey (also known as Blind Joe Death, Takoma Records), Michael Stewart (also known as Backwards Sam Firk), Stefan Grossman (also known as Kid Future, Kicking Mule Records), Tom Hoskins (also known as Fang, who "rediscovered" Mississippi John Hurt), Bernie Klatzko (Herwin Records), Jim McKune, Nick Perls (Yazoo and Blue Goose Records), Phil Spiro (who, along with Nick Perls and Dick Waterman, "rediscovered" Eddie "Son" House) and Pete Whelan (Origin Jazz Library).

He died at the Regional Medical Center in Spartanburg, South Carolina, aged 71.
