= Quasi at the Quackadero =

1975 film by Sally Cruikshank

- Still from 6:49 of "Quasi at the Quackadero", depicting Anita and Quasi at left
- Directed by: Sally Cruikshank
- Starring: Kim Deitch; Sally Cruikshank
- Release date: November 9, 1975
- Running time: 10 minutes
- Country: United States
- Language: English

Quasi at the Quackadero is a 1975 American independent animated short by Sally Cruikshank. This cartoon follows two anthropomorphic ducks and a pet robot at an amusement park where phenomena such as time travel, telepathy, and reincarnation are exhibited as sideshow attractions. In 2009, it was selected for preservation in the United States National Film Registry by the Library of Congress.

== Plot ==
The short stars Quasi, "an infantile duck with buck front teeth, thick glasses and a red cape", voiced by Kim Deitch; Anita, whom one writer described as "Betty Boop with a New Wave wardrobe" and whose Mae West-like voice was supplied by Cruikshank; and robot Rollo. They progress through the Quackadero, a Coney Island-esque sideshow with such attractions as the Hall of Time Mirrors, which depict the viewer as he or she will look in "old age" or "100 years from now"; the Roll Back Time Machine, in which Rollo watches a skyscraper's life running backward; the Think-o-Blink Machine, which illustrates one's thoughts; the game show-like act "Your Shining Moment"; Madame Xano's, where the audience can see last night's dreams; and the Time Holes, in which one can lean on a railing and see a live slice of three million years ago unfold.

Having found themselves unable to tolerate Quasi's rude behavior any further, Anita and Rollo quickly come up with a plan to permanently get rid of him using the Time Hole, which no one can escape from after falling into. Anita distracts Quasi with a chocolate cake and places it slightly over the railing for him to try to reach. Rollo is then given the signal by her to push Quasi into the Time Hole, sending him back to the year 3,000,000 BC. Now forever trapped in prehistoric times, Quasi is last seen eating a slice of watermelon until he is forced to run away from an odd-looking creature.

== Production ==
Animator Sally Cruikshank, while a graduate student at the San Francisco Art Institute, in San Francisco, California, created the animated short Chow Fun (1972), editing it at the city's Snazelle Films, a commercial-film company that also rented space and film equipment. This led to Cruikshank being hired there, and becoming head of animation by the end of summer 1972. While working at Snazelle, Cruikshank developed Quasi at the Quackadero, her best-known work.

Initially given working titles that included I Walked with a Duck, Hold That Quasi, and Quasi Quacks Up, the 10-minute, 35mm short, with 100 watercolor backgrounds and approximately 5,000 cels, took two years for Cruikshank to draw, followed by four months for photography and post-production. Cruikshank independently financed the $6,000 budget, which went primarily for cel painting, sound recording and lab and camera work. Underground cartoonist Kim Deitch, then Cruikshank's boyfriend, did much of the inking, using dip pen and rapidograph, with Kathryn Lenihan doing most of the cel painting.

The music, by Bob Armstrong and Al Dodge, of the Berkeley, California band the Cheap Suit Serenaders, used slide flute, xylophone, ukulele, duck call, boat whistle and bagpipe to create what Cruikshank called the "strange, gallopy feeling" of 1920s/1930s dance-band music, of which she is a devotee.

== Reception and legacy ==
Quasi at the Quackadero won awards and was shown at the Los Angeles Film Exposition, and made its first theatrical booking at the Northside Theater in Berkeley, not far from Cruikshank's home at the time at 1890 Arch Street in that city.

In 1994, Quasi at the Quackadero was voted #46 of the 50 Greatest Cartoons of all time by members of the animation field.

In 2008, a portion of it appeared in the opening credits of the direct-to-DVD animated feature Futurama: Bender's Game.

In 2009, it was selected for preservation in the United States National Film Registry by the Library of Congress.

== See also ==
- List of American films of 1975
- Underground comics
- Independent animation
