= Robert Armstrong (cartoonist) =

American cartoonist

- Born: 1950 (age 75–76) Pasadena, California
- Areas: Cartoonist, illustrator, musician
- Pseudonyms: Aldo Bobbo; Bobbo Armstrong; Lucky Bob; Rob Armstrong; L. B. Armstrong
- Notable works: Mickey Rat
- www.armstrongartandnoveltyhut.com

Robert Armstrong (born 1950) is a cartoonist, illustrator, painter, and musician. He is known for his underground comix character Mickey Rat, for popularizing the term "couch potato," and for being a member of Robert Crumb's band the Cheap Suit Serenaders.

== Biography ==
Armstrong attended Pasadena High School, graduating in 1968, and Pasadena City College from 1969 to 1971. He did course work at the Chouinard Art Institute from 1967 to 1969.

Armstrong's paintings and illustrations have been exhibited in galleries since the late 1980s.

== Mickey Rat and other comics work ==
Mickey Rat (an obvious parody of Mickey Mouse) was created by Armstrong in 1971 as a character on a T-shirt. The popularity of the character led to him appearing in comics, which were initially scripted by Chester C. Crill. Mickey's first appearance was L.A. Comics #1 (published by the Los Angeles Comic Book Company in December 1971). Mickey was "sleazy, opportunistic, capable of just about any foul deed, but also shallow, one-dimensional, and incapable of growth or subtlety. He seems to have had little in the way of motivation, beyond his creators' desire to make him the opposite of the other Mickey in every possible way."

Mickey Rat #1 came out in 1972, also scripted by Crill and illustrated by Amstrong, and published by the Los Angeles Comic Book Company. Issue #2 was partially written by Crill and Armstrong separately and was published by Kitchen Sink Press later in 1972.

Mickey Rat issues #3 and #4 were published in 1980 and 1982, respectively, by Last Gasp.

In the mid-1970s, R. Crumb's friend Harvey Pekar laid out a few of his autobiographical stories with crude stick figures and showed them to Crumb and Armstrong. Impressed, they both offered to illustrate, and both contributed to Pekar's earliest published comics (although Armstrong never illustrated any stories in Pekar's comic book series American Splendor).

Over his career, Armstrong has contributed stories (many involving Mickey Rat) to many anthologies, including Weirdo, Arcade, and Comix Book. Armstrong's work was included in Fantagraphics' 1991 collection Best Comics of the Decade, Vol. 1.

More recently, Armstrong's artwork has appeared regularly in Mineshaft (magazine), from 2005 to 2023.

== Musician ==
Armstrong has been a member of R. Crumb & His Cheap Suit Serenaders since the 1970s, performing vocals, musical saw, and guitar. As of 2006, Crumb is no longer much involved with the group; Armstrong continues to perform with the band.

Armstrong's musical saw solo is featured in the opening and closing theme music for Miloš Forman's One Flew Over the Cuckoo’s Nest. Commenting on the score, reviewer Steven McDonald has said, "The edgy nature of the film extends into the score, giving it a profoundly disturbing feel at times — even when it appears to be relatively normal. The music has a tendency to always be a little off-kilter, and from time to time it tilts completely over into a strange little world of its own ..."

Armstrong and fellow Cheap Suit Serenader Al Dodge scored the 1975 animated short Quasi at the Quackadero, by Sally Cruikshank. They used slide flute, xylophone, ukulele, duck calls, boat whistles, and bagpipes to create what Cruikshank called the "strange, gallopy feeling" of 1920s/1930s dance-band music, of which she is a devotee. Armstrong also recorded music for another Cruikshank film, Make Me Psychic (1976).

== "Couch potato" ==
The term "couch potato" was coined by a friend of Armstrong in the 1970s. Armstrong featured a group of couch potatoes in a series of comics featuring sedentary characters; and with Jack Mingo and Al Dodge created a satirical organization that purported to watch television as a form of meditation. With three books and endless promotion through the 1980s, the Couch Potatoes appeared in hundreds of newspapers, magazines and broadcasts, spreading its "turn on, tune in, veg out" message, garnering 7,000 members, and popularizing the term.

== Bibliography ==
=== Comic book titles ===
- Mickey Rat (4 issues, various publishers, 1972–1982)

=== Books ===
- Pitching In (Jalmar Press, 1980)
- The Official Couch Potato Handbook (Capra Press, 1983)
- The Couch Potato Guide to Life (Avon Books, 1984)
- The Couch Potato Cookbook (Warner Books, 1988)
- A Frog’s Tale (Words and Muse Productions, 1990)
- Exploring Farmer Cooperatives (Agricultural Council of California, 1997)
- Tending Your Money Garden (Rossonya Books, 1998)
