= Black Patti Records =

American record label

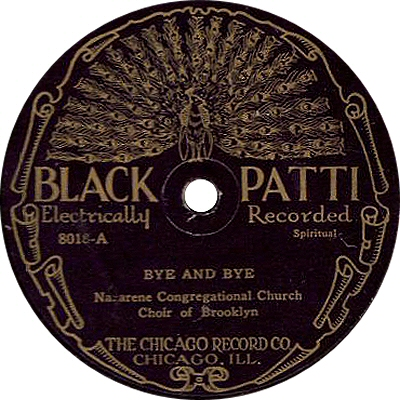
- Parent company: The Chicago Record Company
- Founded: 1927
- Founder: Mayo Williams
- Defunct: 1927
- Status: Defunct
- Genre: Jazz, blues, sermons, spirituals, vaudeville
- Country of origin: U.S.
- Location: Chicago, Illinois
- Official website: www.blackpatti.com

Black Patti Records was a short-lived American record label based in Chicago, Illinois, United States, founded by Mayo Williams in 1927. It was named after the black opera singer Matilda Sissieretta Joyner Jones, who was called Black Patti because some thought she resembled the Italian opera singer Adelina Patti. The label lasted seven months and produced 55 records. The Black Patti peacock logo was used in the 1960s by Nick Perls for his Belzona and Yazoo labels.

At Paramount, Mayo Williams was a successful producer of race records, i.e., records made by black musicians to be sold to black customers. When he left Paramount to start Black Patti, he had no equipment, only his Chicago office space. The records were pressed at Gennett Records in Richmond, Indiana. The catalog included jazz, blues, sermons, spirituals, and vaudeville skits, most but not all by black entertainers. Willie Hightower was among the musicians who recorded for the label. Williams closed the label before the end of 1927.

== See also ==
- List of record labels
