= Don Kent =

Don Kent may refer to:

- Don Kent (blues historian) (1944–2015), American blues and bluegrass historian and collector
- Don Kent (meteorologist) (1917–2010), American TV and radio meteorologist in Boston, Massachusetts
- Don Kent (wrestler) (1933–1993), American professional wrestler
