= Marley's Ghost (disambiguation) =

Marley's Ghost is the spirit of the deceased Jacob Marley who haunts Ebenezer Scrooge in Charles Dickens' 1843 story A Christmas Carol.

Marley's Ghost may also refer to:

- Marley's Ghost (band), from California
- Marley's Ghost, 2003 stage play by Jeff Goode
- Scrooge, or, Marley's Ghost, 1901 British short film

== See also ==
- Marley's Ghosts, British comedy television series
