= Country Turtle Records =

American record label

- Founded: 1970s
- Founder: Don Kent
- Status: Defunct
- Genre: American old-time and country
- Country of origin: U.S.
- Location: New York City

Country Turtle Records was an independent American record label set up in the 1970s in New York City by Don Kent. The label specialized in early American old time and country music.

Like its sister label Mamlish Records in the blues field, the label was active re-issuing samplers and single artists' albums of prewar recordings, first released as Shellac 78 rpm records. Country Turtle was the first label to release the Dixon Brothers' prewar material on vinyl. The sampler Gambler's Lament consisted of prewar recordings of artists as varied as Bascom Lamar Lunsford, Posey Rorer and the North Carolina Ramblers, Blind Andy, and Rabbit Brown.

== Discographical data ==
- Country Turtle 6000 - The Dixon Brothers Beyond Black Smoke (notes by Pat Conte)
- Country Turtle 6001 - Various Artists Gambler's Lament (notes by Pat Conte, Frank Mare & Barbara Beamon)
- Country Turtle 6002 - The Dixon Brothers Rambling and Gambling (notes by Pat Conte)

== See also ==
- List of record labels
