= Mark Spoelstra =

American singer (1940–2007)

- Born: Mark Warren Spoelstra; June 30, 1940; Kansas City, Missouri, United States
- Died: February 24, 2007 (aged 66) Pioneer, California, United States
- Genres: Folk, blues
- Occupations: Singer-songwriter, guitarist
- Label: Elektra Records
- Website: www.markspoelstra.net

Mark Warren Spoelstra (June 30, 1940 – February 24, 2007) was an American singer-songwriter and folk and blues guitarist.

== Biography ==
He was born and raised in Kansas City, Missouri. He began his musical career in Los Angeles in his teens and traveled around winding up in New York City in time to take part in the folk music revival of the early 1960s. He is best remembered for his activity in the Greenwich Village area. He performed with Bob Dylan soon after Dylan's arrival in New York City, was a contributor to Broadside, and recorded a number of albums for Folkways Records and other labels.

Spoelstra was raised as a Quaker. His career was put on hold from 1963 to 1965, when he performed alternative service as a conscientious objector in Fresno, California. In the mid-1960s, he frequently performed at the Ash Grove in West Hollywood and the Cabale Creamery in Berkeley. It was here that he wrote most of his best songs, including an album of country songs used as the sound-track for the movie Electra Glide in Blue.

In 1969, while living in Sonoma County, California, he formed the Frontier Constabulary with Mitch Greenhill and Mayne Smith. After Spoelstra left to resume his solo career in 1970, the band continued as the Frontier.

Spoelstra later settled near Modesto, California, where he lived until his death. Withdrawing from the touring life to raise a family, Spoelstra and his wife Sheri embraced Christianity. In the mid-1970s he became a minister and used his musical talents as a means to preach his spiritual messages. In the late 1970s, he recorded and released two albums of Gospel music, Somehow I Always Knew and Comin' Back To Town.

Retiring from music in the early 1980s, he worked for a number of years as a tour bus driver in Yosemite National Park. Throughout this period in his life, Spoelstra remained in touch with his music. In 2001, he recorded an album entitled, Out Of My Hands for the Origin Jazz Library label; the first record he had made in 20 years. The album is a mix of new songs written for the album and some of his old favorites. In his later years he returned to the stage to perform on a limited scale. He would perform until the summer of 2006 when illness forced him to stop. Several of his albums recorded for Elektra Records, long out of print, have been reissued. Spoelstra died from complications of pancreatic cancer at his home in Pioneer, California on February 25, 2007.

== Discography ==
For an in depth, illustrated discography, see https://www.wirz.de/music/spoeldsc.htm

=== Studio albums and live recordings ===
- The Songs Of Mark Spoelstra with Twelve-String Guitar (Folkways, 1963)
- Mark Spoelstra recorded at Club 47 Inc. (Folkways, 1963)
- Mark Spoelstra: five & twenty questions (Elektra, 1965)
- State Of Mind (Elektra, 1966)
- Mark Spoelstra (Columbia, 1969)
- This House (Fantasy Records, 1971. Also on Bellaphon Records, Germany )
- Somehow I Always Knew (Aslan Records, 1977)
- Comin' Back To Town (Inwood Records, 1979)
- Out Of My Hands (Origin Jazz Library, 2001)
