= Larry Gene Bell =

American serial killer (1949–1996)

- Born: October 30, 1949; Ralph, Alabama, U.S.
- Died: October 4, 1996 (aged 46); Broad River Correctional Institution, South Carolina, U.S.
- Status: Executed by electrocution
- Convictions: Murder (2 counts); Kidnapping (2 counts)
- Penalty: Death

Details
- Victims: 3–4+ (2 convictions)
- Span of crimes: 1984–1985
- Country: United States
- States: North Carolina; South Carolina
- Date apprehended: June 27, 1985

Larry Gene Bell (October 30, 1949 – October 4, 1996) was an American serial killer who abducted, raped, and murdered at least three women and girls in the Carolinas from 1984 to 1985. In addition to this, Bell remains the prime suspect in at least one disappearance. Convicted for the two murders in South Carolina, he was sentenced to death and executed in 1996.

== Background ==
Bell was born in Ralph, Alabama, and had three sisters and one brother. The family reportedly moved frequently. Bell attended Eau Claire High School in Columbia, South Carolina from 1965 to 1967. The Bell family moved to Mississippi, where he graduated high school and trained as an electrician. He then returned to Columbia, married, and had one son.

Bell joined the United States Marine Corps in 1970 but was discharged the same year due to a knee injury suffered when he accidentally shot himself when cleaning a gun. The following year, he worked as a correctional officer at the Department of Corrections in Columbia for one month. Bell and his family moved to Rock Hill, South Carolina in 1972, and the couple divorced in 1976.

== Victims ==
=== Confirmed ===
On November 18, 1984, Sandee Elaine Cornett, then aged 26, was last seen arriving home at 6:30 p.m. in Charlotte, North Carolina. The following day, when she failed to show up for work, her neighbor reported her missing. Bell was considered the main suspect, as he was reportedly her previous boyfriend's co-worker at Charlotte Douglas International Airport and had attended a party at her home. He denied abducting and killing her but made statements, including drawing a map, that suggested where her body was buried.

In February 2025, the Charlotte-Mecklenburg Police Department released a statement in which they formally identified Bell as Cornett's killer, despite the fact that her remains have not been found. She remains listed as a missing person on various databases, but her case is officially cleared.

Bell kidnapped 17-year-old Shari Faye Smith at gunpoint from the end of her driveway on Platt Springs Road in Lexington County, South Carolina on May 31, 1985. Her car was found abandoned at the curb near the mailbox. Over the next few days, Bell called the Smith family regularly from a payphone to tell them that Smith was fine and to taunt them. In fact, she likely was killed within 12 hours of her abduction. Her body was found in Saluda County, South Carolina after Bell called the Smith family and gave them directions to her remains. He also forced Smith to write a "Last Will and Testament" before he murdered her and taunted her family by telephone.

Then, on June 14, Bell kidnapped 9-year-old Debra May Helmick near Old Percival Road in Richland County, South Carolina, killed her, and again called the Smith family to tell them where he had left her body.

=== Suspected ===
Bell was also suspected in the disappearance of 21-year-old Denise Newsom Porch who was last seen in Charlotte, North Carolina on July 31, 1975. Seven years after her disappearance, in 1982, her family had her proclaimed legally dead. Bell is a potential suspect in the Porch case since he was a former electrician who, in 1975, resided around 300 yards away from the Yorktown Apartments where Porch worked as a manager. He was never formally charged in connection with her disappearance.

== Arrest and trial ==
During the largest manhunt in South Carolina history, Bell made eight telephone calls to the Smith family, often speaking with Shari's sister Dawn. During one of his phone calls with Dawn, he accidentally let it slip that, "All I wanted to do was make love with Dawn," instead of "All I wanted to do was make love with Shari." Dawn and Shari had a striking resemblance, and so it is thought he mistook Shari for Dawn. Bell's fixation on Dawn only grew as time passed, and made many more calls. During one, Bell eventually gave exact directions to the locations of both of the bodies and described to the family how he had killed Smith.

On June 27, 1985, Bell was arrested after forensics was able to find indentations of an incomplete phone number on the stationery of the letter that was sent to Smith's family. Filling in the missing digits led the Federal Bureau of Investigation to a couple who hired Bell for some work and had him house sit for them while they were away. Six hairs "microscopically similar" to Shari Smith's hair were found in Bell's apartment. During his six-hour testimony at his trial, Bell continuously blurted out bizarre comments and carried on nonstop theatrics, rambling continuously and refusing to answer questions. He later made statements indicating that he may have been attempting to fake mental illness in order to receive a more lenient sentence.

== Execution ==
Bell chose to die by the electric chair instead of lethal injection. He was executed on October 4, 1996, at the age of 46. He had no final words. There were no more electric chair executions in the state until 2004, when James Neil Tucker was executed for the double murders of Rosa Oakley and Shannon Lynn Mellon.

== Media ==
=== Docudrama ===
- The television movie Nightmare in Columbia County, (Note: The county name is fictitious, although there is a Columbia County in Augusta, Georgia, which is 100km west of the incidents; the incidents took place in both Lexington and Richland counties in South Carolina in the vicinity of the city of Columbia, South Carolina. This is similar to the October 31, 1986 television movie "Vengeance: The Story of Tony Cimo," based the 1982 murder of Rudolph Tyner (Michael Beach) by Donald Henry Gaskins (Brad Dourif) in a scheme where Tony Cimo (Brad Davis) worked with Gaskins and others to kill Tyner, convicted of killing Cimo's parents. Gaskins' name was changed for the film since he was on death row at the time and the state Department of Corrections did not approve his personality rights to be used.) also known as Victim of Beauty: The Dawn Smith Story, aired December 10, 1991. The movie portrayed the events of the Smith murder with a focus on the involvement of Shari's sister Dawn, who later qualified for Miss America 1987 representing the state, in the case.
- Investigation Discovery's I, Witness, titled "The Smith Sisters", season 1, episode 2, aired on January 4, 2017. This 42-minute docudrama reflects the story from the Dawn Smith Jordan's perspective.

=== Documentaries ===
- TruTV's Forensic Files, "Last Will", season 7, episode 42, aired July 26, 2003.
- Investigation Discovery's On the Case with Paula Zahn titled "One Month of Terror", season 7, episode 10, aired February 24, 2013.

== See also ==
- Capital punishment in South Carolina
- Capital punishment in the United States
- List of people executed in South Carolina
- List of people executed in the United States in 1996
- List of serial killers in the United States
