= The 50 Greatest Cartoons =

1994 book by Jerry Beck

- Editor: Jerry Beck
- Subject: Animation
- Publisher: Turner Publishing
- Publication date: October 1, 1994
- Pages: 192
- ISBN: 187868549X
- OCLC: 467065913
- Dewey Decimal: 791.43
- LC Class: NC1766.U5 F54 1994

The 50 Greatest Cartoons: As Selected by 1,000 Animation Professionals is a 1994 book by animation historian Jerry Beck, with a foreword written by Chuck Jones.

The book features the fifty greatest cartoons of all time, selected by a group of 1000 cartoon historians, animation professionals and film critics. The votes were culled from ballots sent to members of the Society for Animation Studies, the International Animated Film Association, one hundred animation studios, and film critics from more than one hundred periodicals.

Each selection has a plot summary, production history, and a critical analysis that examines why they were selected. The book also features commentary from Leonard Maltin, John Canemaker, Joe Adamson, Steve Schneider, Charles Solomon, and Leslie Cabarga.

== Criteria ==
It consists of articles about 50 highly regarded animated short films made in North America and other notable cartoons, which are ranked according to a poll of 1,000 people working in the animation industry and film critics.

Each cartoon is under 30 minutes long and cel animated (with the exception of Gertie the Dinosaur). Seventeen of the selected films were produced for Warner Bros.'s Looney Tunes and Merrie Melodies series, ten of which were directed by Chuck Jones, including the #1 cartoon on the list, What's Opera, Doc? and the overall #2 pick Duck Amuck. Beck said Jones was one of "the most intellectual of the Warner crowd", and that he was one of the "first cartoon directors to experiment with stylized backgrounds and animation techniques, and his cartoons are noted for their highly artistic look and comic timing."

Forty-five of the selected cartoons were created and released before 1960; the exceptions are The Big Snit (1985; No. 25), The Cat Came Back (1988; No. 32), Bambi Meets Godzilla (1969; No. 38), The Man Who Planted Trees (1987; No. 44) and Quasi at the Quackadero (1975; No. 46).

The book's front and rear cover art shows a variety of famous cartoon stars seated in a nightclub. In the appendix, a list of other cartoons with substantial votes are featured.

== By studio ==
Studio	Films
Warner Bros. Cartoons	17
Walt Disney Productions	9
Metro-Goldwyn-Mayer	7
Fleischer Studios	5
United Productions of America	4
National Film Board of Canada	2
Frédéric Back	1
Marv Newland	1
Pat Sullivan	1
Sally Cruikshank	1
Walter Lantz Productions	1
Winsor McCay	1

== Reception and legacy ==
Maryanne Dell wrote in The Orange County Register that the book "is a breeze, a visual delight that brings back childhood afternoons in front of the tube." She also mentioned how the book chronicled the "history of the genre with enough details about how these things work to satisfy anyone with a modicum of interest in the subject." Overall, she stated that the book is "worth the price of admission for the visuals, and a gem of a show."

Sandra Crockett of The Baltimore Sun called the book an "animated feast". She was impressed with the illustrations in the book, complimenting the "animation cels whose colors practically leap off the page". She lauded "Ted Turner and his minions" for their appreciation and preservation of the films.

In his autobiography Chuck Amuck, Jones singled out What's Opera, Doc? "for sheer production quality, magnificent music and wonderful animation, this is probably our (unit's) most elaborate and satisfying production."

A mixture of the book's selections and its runners-up were featured on Cartoon Network on March 14, 1998, as part of "The 50 Greatest Cartoons of All Time" marathon. The reason for this is because the network only aired cartoons owned by Warner Bros., public domain cartoons such as Gertie the Dinosaur, and those licensed to the network at the time (such as The Big Snit and Bambi Meets Godzilla). The marathon also included interviews with animators such as Chuck Jones and Joseph Barbera, as well as historian Leonard Maltin and voice actors Charlie Adler and June Foray. A similar marathon aired the following year.

== See also ==
- Academy Award for Animated Short Film
- Submissions for Best Animated Short Academy Award
- Golden age of American animation
