= Coutchman, Texas =

Ghost town in Texas, United States

Coordinates: 31.8740°N 96.4053°W

Coutchman (sometimes spelled Couchman) is a ghost town in northern Freestone County, Texas, United States, some four miles southwest of Streetman, off Texas Farm to Market Road 246, near CR 994 and CR 995.

Coutchman was settled circa 1850 and named after local landowner William Coutchman. It had a peak population of approximately 300 people. Coutchman had a post office from January 1894 to February 1905, when post was moved to the post office in Wortham. In the 1910 census, Coutchman was listed as having a population of 100 people. By 1980 there was no listing. The area ceased to have an identity as a separate community later in the 20th century.

Coutchman is best known as the birthplace of blues legend Blind Lemon Jefferson.
