= Sally Cruikshank =

American animator (born 1949)

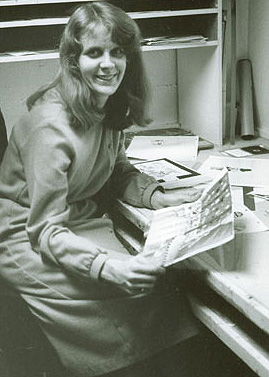
- Cruikshank in the 1970s
- Born: Sarah Cruikshank; 1949 (age 76–77); Chatham, New Jersey, U.S.
- Occupations: Animator, cartoonist, artist
- Years active: 1971–present
- Spouse: Jon Davison (1984–present)
- Children: Dinah Davison
- Relatives: Margaret Mordecai Jones Cruikshank (grandmother)

Sarah "Sally" Cruikshank (born 1949) is an American cartoonist, animator and artist, whose work includes animation for the Children's Television Workshop program Sesame Street, and whose short Quasi at the Quackadero (1975) was inducted into the United States National Film Registry.

== Biography ==
=== Early life and education ===
Sally Cruikshank was born in Chatham, New Jersey, the daughter of parents Rose and Ernest. Her parents were both Southerners, with her father, an accountant who worked in nearby New York City, New York, holding a Phi Beta Kappa key from Duke University, in North Carolina. Ernest's mother, Margaret Mordecai Jones Cruikshank, had been the president of the boarding school formerly known as St. Mary's College in that state. Cruikshank has a brother, and had a sister, Carol, who died in 1991. Their maternal aunt, Bea, was a painter from the 1910s to the 1940s, whose work included a portrait commission by US President Franklin Delano Roosevelt. Cruikshank studied art at Smith College, where in her junior year art teacher Elliot Offner sent slides of her colored-pencil and clay-relief-on-paper drawings to a screening committee that resulted in a scholarship to the two-month Yale Summer Art School. At the urging of a classmate there, Warner Wada, she began considering adapting her drawing style to animation. Returning to Smith for her senior year and obtaining the primer Animation by Preston Blair, Cruikshank, with additional research, arranged for a special-studies class in animation. With an animation stand consisting of a Bolex camera attached to a photo enlarger, constructed by instructor David Batchelder, she produced her first animated short, the three-minute, 16mm "Ducky". Done with watercolor and paper animation, it starred a prototype version of her future recurring character Quasi, which one writer characterized as "an infantile duck with buck front teeth, thick glasses and a red cape". Cruikshank, describing her anthropomorphic characters, said, "My ducks are based on the ducks from Carl Barks' comics. But I guess they got twisted in memory, because people don't seem to see much similarity between them."

Encouraged by the response of "Ducky", Cruikshank, after graduation, enrolled at the San Francisco Art Institute, in San Francisco, California, to study filmmaking. Under instructor Larry Jordan, she made the five-minute animated short Fun on Mars (1971), which used watercolor, crayon markers on paper, cutouts, and collage. Produced for $100, it also featured early versions of her trademark duck-creatures. Her next short, Chow Fun (1972), created with a $400 grant secured in association with PBS, mixed paper animation and cutouts glued onto animation cels.

=== Quasi at the Quackadero ===
While editing "Chow Fun" at San Francisco's Snazelle Films, a commercial-film company that also rented out space and film equipment, Cruikshank, at an employee's suggestion, showed her work to company president E. E. Gregg Snazelle, who gave her a job a week later "to experiment in animation and do TV commercials when there was work". By the end of summer 1972, Cruikshank was head animator there. In 2009, she recalled of her time with Snazelle,

The job was to experiment with animation, and do commercials for him when the jobs came in. He also hoped I'd figure out how to solve 3-d without glasses. Needless to say I didn't solve 3-d. I didn't even do very many commercials over ten years, but I showed up at 8:30, took an hour off for lunch and worked till 5:30. I was paid $350 a month, and I could live on that then. He encouraged me generously without ever paying much attention to me. These days if an opportunity like that even existed, you'd be forced to sign all kinds of rights statements for characters and content created, but this was before Star Wars and he just seemed to be happy to have me around. We were never particularly close. It spoiled me for any job after that. I made all my 'Quasi' films while I was working at Snazelle.

Still from 6:49 of Cruikshank's signature work, Quasi at the Quackadero, depicting Anita and Quasi at left.

In 1975 Cruikshank made a comic strip based on her characters Anita and Quasi, which was published in the third issue of the underground comics magazine Arcade.

At Snazelle, Cruikshank began developing her best-known work, Quasi at the Quackadero (1975), working titles of which included I Walked with a Duck, Hold That Quasi, and Quasi Quacks Up. The 10-minute, 35mm short, with 100 watercolor backgrounds and approximately 5,000 cels, took two years for Cruikshank to draw, followed by four months for photography and post-production. Cruikshank independently financed the $6,000 budget, which went primarily for cel painting, sound recording and lab and camera work. Underground cartoonist Kim Deitch, then Cruikshank's boyfriend, did some of the inking, using dip pen and rapidograph, with Kathryn Lenihan doing most of the cel painting. The short starred Quasi, voiced by Deitch; Anita, which one writer described as "Betty Boop with a New Wave wardrobe" and whose Mae West-like voice was supplied by Cruikshank; and robot Rollo, also voiced by Cruikshank. They progress through the Quackadero, a Coney Island-esque sideshow with such attractions as the Hall of Time Mirrors, which depict the viewer as he or she will look in "old age" or "100 years from now", and the Time Holes, in which one can lean on a railing and see a live slice of three million years B.C. unfold. The music, by the Berkeley, California band the Cheap Suit Serenaders, used slide flute, xylophone, ukulele, duck call, boat whistle and bagpipe to create what Cruikshank called the "strange, gallopy feeling" of 1920s/1930s dance-band music, of which she is a devotee.

Quasi at the Quackadero won awards and was shown at the Los Angeles Film Exposition, and made its first theatrical booking at the Northside Theater in Berkeley, not far from Cruikshank's home at the time at 1890 Arch Street in that city.

=== Other early projects ===
Cruikshank's next short, the eight-minute, 35mm Make Me Psychic (1978; working title Mesmeroid Madness) returns Quasi and Anita and adds the suave Snozzy. Built around a device that taps into one's latent telekinetic power, leading to slapstick at a party, the $14,000 film also was financed by Cruikshank, with the higher budget going toward the hiring of additional cel painters and increased lab fees. Of its slicker look than her previous short, Cruikshank said, "People didn't know what to make of 'Quasi.' It was pretty hard to absorb in one sitting, solid. So, I thought I would try directing the eye more, by simplifying things and giving the next film a clearer focus." The Cheap Suit Serenaders again supplied music.

In 1980, Cruikshank won a $10,000 grant from the National Endowment for the Arts to create a storyboard and three-minute sample reel for a proposed animated feature, Quasi's Cabaret, which she described as involving "three hedonistic ducks who try to open the ultimate tropical nightclub." She also tried developing feature projects combining live action and animation, one a comedy set in a mental institution, the other, Joystick, "sort of a humorous horror story" about the effects of computer animation on an artist modeled on herself. Additionally, she attempted to sell cable-TV networks on Weird Airways, a projected series of three-minute shorts starring Snozzy as the owner-pilot of a charter airline and Anita as a flight attendant.

=== Later work and life ===
Cruikshank evolved a recognizable style with surrealistic and psychedelic elements. Her film Face Like a Frog (1987) bears a musical score by Oingo Boingo, with the group's Danny Elfman singing his song "Don't Go in the Basement."

Cruikshank has contributed animation sequences to feature films, including Twilight Zone: The Movie (1983) and Top Secret! (1984), as well as the opening title sequences to Ruthless People (1986), Mannequin (1987), Loverboy (1989), Madhouse (1990), and Smiley Face (2007). She has also worked in commercials and website design. Cruikshank also animated and produced many music videos for Sesame Street from 1989–1999.

For a short time in the 1990s, Cruikshank was employed by the Palo Alto laboratory and technology incubator Interval Research Corporation as an animator.

Cruikshank was in the process, as of 2011, of transferring her works into 35mm film format, for archival purposes.

Cruikshank then participated in a Halloween special of SpongeBob SquarePants called "The Legend of Boo-Kini Bottom" in the 2D section of that special.

In 2026 Cruikshank co-directed Sally's Gallery - a compilation of some of her best works with some new animations added in between - with Adam Asmat.

== Personal life ==
Cruikshank was in a relationship with underground cartoonist Kim Deitch during the period 1971–c. 1982. On March 17, 1984, she married producer Jon Davison, with whom she has a daughter, Dinah.

== Influences and style ==
Cruikshank's main influences were Carl Barks, Robert Crumb, Max Fleischer, Amedee Van Beuren, Pat Sullivan, Heinz Edelmann, George Dunning, Otto Messmer, Victor Moscoso, Winsor McCay and early Bob Clampett. She prefers the early New York City animation of such producers as the Fleischer Studios and the Van Beuren Studios. She took great inspiration from American cartoonist and animator Winsor Mccay as well, stating in an interview that his imaginative work had a huge influence on her, which can particularly be seen in her film Quasi at the Quackadero. In a 1981 interview, she said of her own style at the time,

I think I have a different concept of motion than most other animators. One thing that bothers me about so many contemporary animators is that they've learned a language from other animators. You see the same hand movements, the same 'blink' 'blink' 'blink' when a character asks a question. Too many animators don't try to picture the dynamics of movement, to use it creatively. I'm not that great an animator per se, but I do think I have a sense of motion that makes for an offbeat view of the world.

== Animated short films ==
- Ducky (1971)
- Fun on Mars (1971)
- Chow Fun (1972)
- Quasi at the Quackadero (1975)
- Make Me Psychic (1978)
- Quasi's Cabaret Trailer (1980)
- Anijam (1984)
- Face Like a Frog (1987)

Several other short films are on Cruikshank's YouTube channel.

== Awards and honors ==
In 1986, Cruikshank won the initial Maya Deren Award for independent film and video artists, given by the American Film Institute, along with Stan Brakhage and Nam June Paik.

In 2009, Quasi at the Quackadero was selected for preservation in the United States National Film Registry by the Library of Congress. It was voted No. 46 in the 1994 book The 50 Greatest Cartoons: As Selected by 1,000 Animation Professionals.
