= Art Laibly =

Arthur Charles Laibly (April 17, 1894 – October 30, 1971) was an American record producer and sales manager. He was the first to make commercial recordings of Blind Lemon Jefferson and Skip James, and also recorded many other notable blues performers including Charley Patton and Son House, for Paramount Records in the 1920s and early 1930s.

He was born in Cincinnati, Ohio, moving with his parents to Covington, Kentucky as a child. He played violin in local dance bands, and later worked for a lumber company, before becoming a sales manager for the Wisconsin Chair Company, the parent company of Paramount Records, in Port Washington, Wisconsin. In 1925 he was appointed as Sales Manager and Recording Director at Paramount, with authority over J. Mayo Williams. In late 1925, Dallas record salesman R. T. Ashford wrote suggesting that Laibly record the then-unknown Blind Lemon Jefferson. He did so, in early 1926 in Chicago, and Jefferson's records became highly successful. Laibly also started recording further blues musicians, including Bo Weavil Jackson, Lucille Bogan, Charley Patton, Son House, and Skip James, who were recommended to him by talent agents in the southern States such as H. C. Speir.

Laibly reportedly had little regard for the qualities of the music he was recording. He accepted recommendations from agents without auditioning the musicians, and his approach to recording was described as "whimsical"; when recording Son House in Grafton, Wisconsin, in 1930, for instance, Laibly would listen to a single verse of each song before deciding whether or not to record it.

Laibly was dismissed by Paramount in 1931, partly as a result of the decline in record sales with the development of radio. He later worked as a salesman of other products, and as an insurance agent. He died in 1971.
