= Walter Roland =

American singer

- Born: December 20, 1902 or December 4, 1903; Ralph, Tuscaloosa County, Alabama, United States
- Died: October 12, 1972; Fairfield, Alabama, United States
- Genres: Blues, boogie-woogie
- Occupations: Musician, songwriter
- Instruments: Piano, guitar, vocals
- Years active: 1920s–1935
- Labels: ARC, Banner

Walter Roland (possibly December 20, 1902 – October 12, 1972) was an American blues and boogie-woogie pianist, guitarist and singer, noted for his association with Lucille Bogan, Josh White and Sonny Scott. The music journalist Gérard Herzhaft stated that Roland was "a great piano player... as comfortable in boogie-woogies as in slow blues," adding that "Roland – with his manner of playing and his singing – was direct and rural."

== Biography ==
Roland was born in Ralph, Tuscaloosa County, Alabama. Possible dates include December 20, 1902 (according to his Social Security documentation), or December 4, 1903 (according to his death certificate), though the researchers Bob Eagle and Eric LeBlanc suggest 1900 on the basis of 1910 census information.

Roland started playing on the Birmingham blues circuit in the 1920s. A competent and versatile pianist, his range covered slow blues to upbeat, jaunty boogie-woogie numbers. He was also skilled as a guitar player and had a forceful singing voice. Between 1933 and 1935, Roland traveled to New York City on three occasions, recording around fifty songs under his own name for Banner Records (ARC). In 1933, he recorded "Red Cross Store Blues" (variously "Red Cross Blues"), his cynical viewpoint on welfare benefits. As a counter-balance, the following year, Roland recorded "CWA Blues" in reference to the Civil Works Administration. The lyrics included the lines "I hollered 'Hey woman, lawd God is you goin' my way?', 'Cause I got a job workin' for the CWA". Amongst his other better-known efforts are "No Good Biddie", "Jookit Jookit", "Piano Stomp", "Whatcha Gonna Do", and "Early This Morning".

In addition to his solo output, Roland also recorded as an accompanist for other musicians. For example, the guitarist and singer Sonny Scott recorded fourteen tracks for Vocalion in 1933, all of them backed by Roland. The tracks included two instrumentals ("Guitar Stomp" and "Railroad Stomp"), billed on record as the Jolly Two, in which Roland matched Scott's guitar work.

Lucille Bogan was usually accompanied by Roland on piano, although he sometimes played an acoustic guitar backing. She was also in New York in 1933, and, apparently to conceal her identity, began recording as Bessie Jackson for Banner Records. She recorded over 100 songs between 1933 and 1935, including some of her biggest commercial successes such as "Seaboard Blues", "Troubled Mind", and "Superstitious Blues".

During this same period, Roland also accompanied Josh White on several tracks.

Bogan's final recordings with Roland and White included two takes of "Shave 'Em Dry", recorded in New York on Tuesday, March 5, 1935. The unexpurgated alternate take is notorious for its explicit sexual references, a unique record of the lyrics sung in after-hours clubs.

Roland did not record beyond this point and, by 1950, had become a farmer, then known by the nicknames Old Soul and Shave 'Em Dry. In the 1960s, he performed as a street musician for several years. He lost his sight after intervening in a neighbor's argument, when he was inadvertently hit by buckshot. In the late 1960s he retired to Fairfield, Alabama, and was cared for by his daughters, having earlier being widowed.

Roland died of lung cancer on October 12, 1972, in Fairfield. His place of burial is the Oakland Cemetery, Brighton, Alabama.

Apart from the musicians mentioned above, several notables recorded versions of Roland's songs, including Sonny Boy Williamson II, Big Joe Williams, Booker T. Laury, Kim Simmonds, Koerner, Ray & Glover, Fred McDowell, and Lead Belly.

Roland's track "Every Morning Blues" (recorded August 2, 1934, in New York), appeared on the 1992 compilation album Roots 'n Blues: The Retrospective 1925–1950. In 1994, Document Records released a twin set of all of Roland's solo recordings.

== Discography ==
=== Selected compilation albums ===
Album title	Record label	Year of release
Complete Recorded Works in Chronological Order, vol. 1 (1933)	Document Records	1994
Complete Recorded Works in Chronological Order, vol. 2, 1934–1935	Document Records	1994

== See also ==
- List of blues musicians
- List of boogie woogie musicians
- List of country blues musicians
