= Willie Hightower =

American jazz musician

Willie H. Hightower (October 1889, Nashville - December 1959, Chicago) was an American jazz cornetist and trumpeter.

Hightower moved to New Orleans and played with a group called the American Stars from about 1908 to about 1917. He also accompanied the vaudeville show The Smart Set alongside pianist Lottie Frost; the pair wed in the mid-1910s, and Frost would become better known under her husband's surname. They played as a duo at the Strand Theater in Jacksonville, Florida in 1916-1917, played in Mississippi in 1917, and moved to Chicago around the turn of the decade. Hightower played regularly in the early 1920s in Chicago ensembles, and joined Carroll Dickerson's group in 1925; following this, he played with his wife's group, Lottie Hightower's Nighthawks. They recorded with Richard M. Jones on the label Black Patti in 1927.

In the 1930s he worked with Dickerson once more as well as with theater ensembles, and worked with Andrew Hilaire in 1933. He quit music around 1940.
