= Erin Barrett =

Author, trivia writer, and life coach

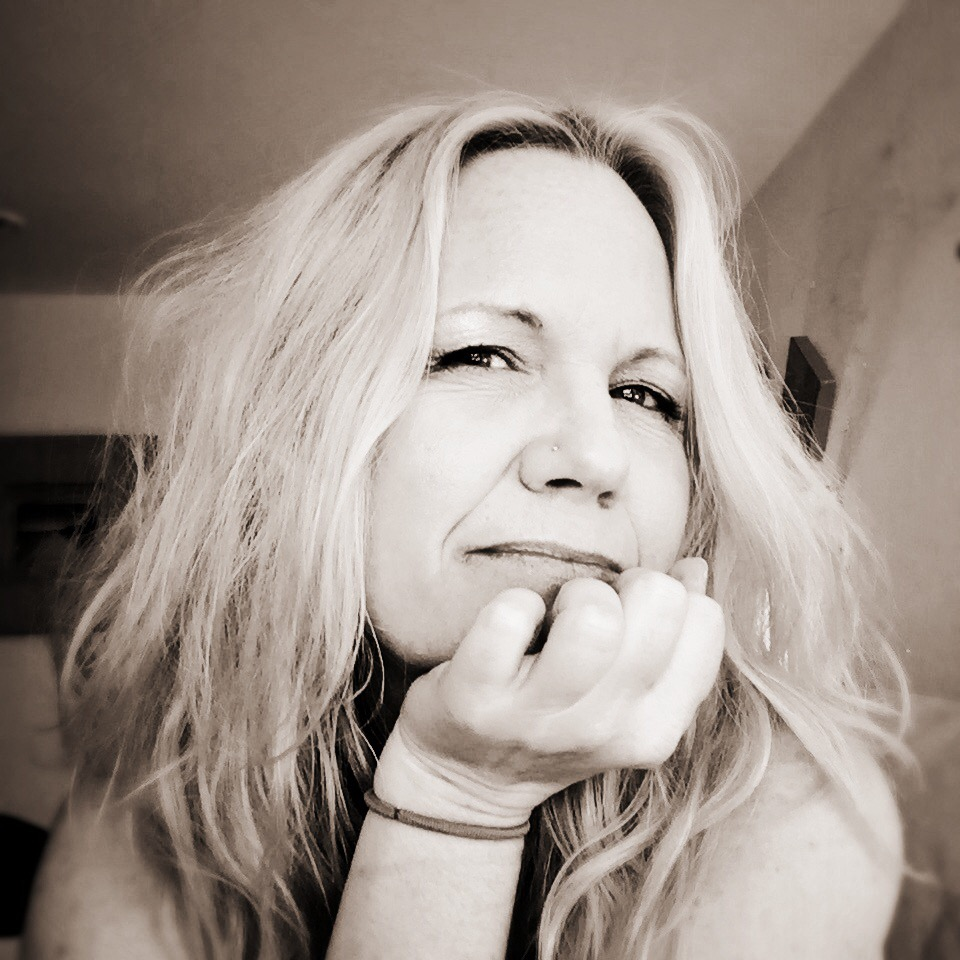
- Born: Leigh Erin Barrett; April 15, 1968 (age 58); Birmingham, Alabama, U.S.
- Education: New College of California
- Occupations: writer; entrepreneur; life coach

Erin Barrett (born 1968) is an author, trivia writer, and life coach.

== Biography ==
Erin Barrett was born in 1968. She grew up in South East Asia. She attended Samford University and has a BA in Humanities from the New College of California. Currently she lives in Fremont, California.

She and her ex-husband Jack Mingo are co-founders and co-writers of the Ask Jeeves series of trivia books which published selected "questions as they flowed, unedited, into the well-known Web site". They were relied upon by game shows such as Who Wants to Be a Millionaire? and have generated over 30,000 trivia questions for online games. Barrett has a decade of work within the wine industry.

On February 27, 2004, Barrett appeared as one of the Three Wise Men, a lifeline introduced in the U.S., on Who Wants to Be a Millionaire.

== Selected works ==
- Just Curious, Jeeves: What Are the 1001 Most Intriguing Questions Asked on the Internet? (2000) ISBN 193010801X
- Just Curious About History, Jeeves (2002) ISBN 0743427092
- Just Curious About Animals and Nature, Jeeves (2002) ISBN 0743427106
- Doctors Killed George Washington: Hundreds of Fascinating Facts from the World of Medicine (2002) ISBN 1573247197
- Not Another Apple for the Teacher: Hundreds of Fascinating Facts from the World of Education (2002) ISBN 1573247235
- Random Kinds Of Factness: 1001(or So) Absolutely True Tidbits About (Mostly) Everything (2005) ISBN 1573242128
- Just Curious about Science, Jeeves (2003) ISBN 0743427114
- It Takes a Certain Type to be a Writer: Facts from the World of Writing and Publishing (2003) ISBN 1573247227
- W. C. Privy's Original Bathroom Companion (2003) ISBN 031228750X
- Cause of Death: A Perfect Little Guide to What Kills Us (2009) ISBN 1416554793
