= Roy Book Binder =

American singer-songwriter (1943–2026)

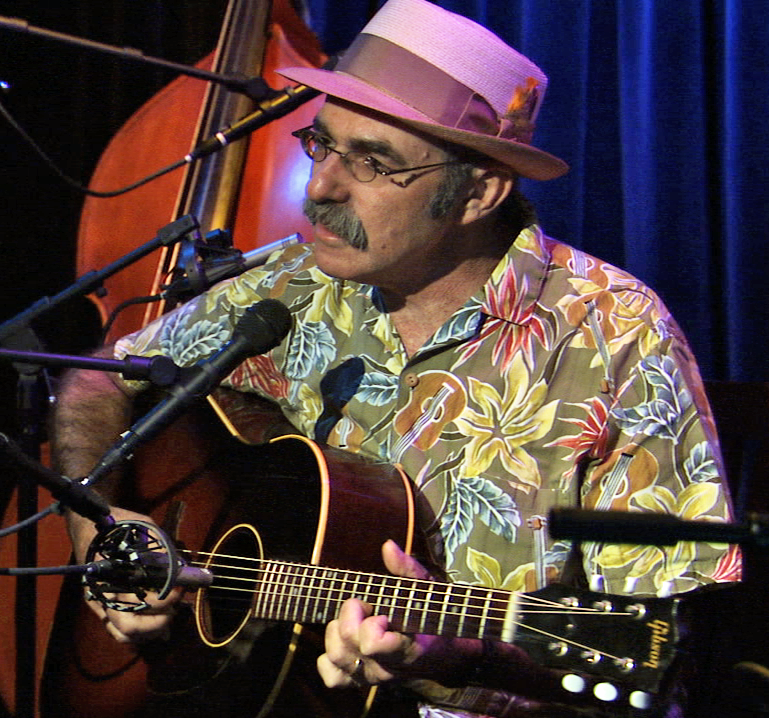

Background information
- Born: October 5, 1943; New York City, U.S.
- Died: March 3, 2026 (aged 82)
- Genres: Folk blues, acoustic blues
- Occupations: Guitarist, singer, songwriter
- Instruments: Guitar, vocals
- Years active: Mid-1960s–2026
- Label: Various
- Website: Roybookbinder.com

Roy Alan Bookbinder (October 5, 1943 – March 3, 2026), known professionally as Roy Book Binder, was an American blues guitarist, singer-songwriter and storyteller. A student and friend of the Reverend Gary Davis, he was equally at home with blues and ragtime. He was known to shift from open tunings to slide arrangements to original compositions, with both traditional and self-styled licks. His storytelling was another characteristic that made his style unique.

== Life and career ==
Roy Bookbinder was born in Queens, New York City, on October 5, 1943. Upon graduation from high school, he joined the Navy and undertook a tour of duty in Europe. He bought his first guitar at a military base in Italy. After completing his enlistment, he returned to New York, where he met and became friends with his guitar hero, Dave Van Ronk. Book Binder soon sought out Davis, who also lived in New York, and became his student and later his chauffeur and tour companion. Much of Book Binder's original material is based on his time on the road with Davis.

By the mid- to late 1960s, Book Binder was recording for both Kicking Mule and Blue Goose Records. In 1969, he toured England with Arthur "Big Boy" Crudup and Homesick James.

After meeting another of his musical influences, the bluesman Pink Anderson, Book Binder released his first album, Travelin' Man, on Adelphi. The album was named after one of the songs he learned from Anderson.

In 1973, he began a partnership with the fiddler Fats Kaplin, and they recorded Git Fiddle Shuffle in 1973. They performed together for three years, playing numerous concerts and recording a second album, Ragtime Millionaire, in 1977. After this partnership dissolved, Book Binder began touring the country, living in a motor home, and concentrating on live performances.

Book Binder has been described as a guitar-picking hillbilly bluesman. He released 12 albums and performed at most major blues and folk festivals in the U.S. and Europe, including Merlefest. Notables that have shared the stage with Book Binder include Bonnie Raitt, B.B. King, John Jackson, Sonny Terry, Doc Watson, Ray Charles, and Brownie McGhee. He has appeared regularly on Nashville Now. He is listed in Blues Who's Who, by the music historian Sheldon Harris.

Book Binder was a veteran guitar instructor and taught at the Fur Peace Ranch with Jorma Kaukonen and others whose lives have been influenced by Davis. There he demonstrated songs, turnarounds, chord variations, right-hand methods, and many of his own adaptations and unique approaches to the blues.

His album Hillbilly Blues Cats (Rounder) was named as one of the ten most essential acoustic guitar albums of 1992. The 1992 category winners also included Eric Clapton's Unplugged, Lyle Lovett's Joshua Judges Ruth and Neil Young's Harvest Moon.

Bookbinder died on March 3, 2026, at the age of 82.

== Albums ==
- Travelin' Man (1971, Adelphi Records)
- Git Fiddle Shuffle (1975, Blue Goose Records)
- Ragtime Millionaire (1977, Blue Goose)
- Goin' Back to Tampa (1979, Flying Fish Records)
- Bookeroo! (1988, Rounder Records)
- The Hillbilly Blues Cats (1992, Rounder)
- Live Book... Don't Start Me Talkin... (1994, Rounder)
- Polk City Ramble (1998, Rounder)
- The Radio Show (2000, PEGleg Records)
- Singer Songwriter Bluesman (2001, PEGleg)
- Live at the Fur Peace Station (2005, PEGleg)
- In Concert ... Road Songs & Stories (2009, PEGleg)
- The Good Book (2013, PEGleg)
- In Concert Road Songs And Stories (2017, PEGleg)
