= Mamlish Records =

- Founded: 1970
- Country of origin: United States

Mamlish Records was an American independent record label, set up in the early 1970s by Don Kent. It specialized in early American blues music.

Along with Nick Perls' Yazoo Records, it was the label most active in the field of re-issuing mainly samplers, but also single artists' albums (Mississippi Sheiks, Lonnie Johnson, Barbecue Bob, Big Joe Williams, Ed Bell) of pre and post-war blues records, first released as Shellac 78 rpm records.

== See also ==
- List of record labels
