= Ralph, Alabama =

- Unincorporated community
- Location within Alabama Location within the United States
- Coordinates: 33°02′31″N 87°46′08″W
- Country: United States
- State: Alabama
- County: Tuscaloosa
- Elevation: 157 ft (48 m)
- Time zone: UTC-6 (Central (CST))
  - Summer (DST): UTC-5 (CDT)
- ZIP code: 35480
- Area codes: 205, 659
- GNIS feature ID: 153104

Ralph is an unincorporated community in Tuscaloosa County, Alabama, United States. Ralph is located near U.S. Route 11 and U.S. Route 43, 16.4 miles (26.4 km) southwest of Tuscaloosa. Ralph has a post office with ZIP code 35480, which opened on March 3, 1900. Ralph was originally known as Hickman, in honor of the first postmaster, William P. Hickman. In 1900, the name was changed to Ralph, either for Ralph Stewart, the son of the postmaster at the time, or Kathleen Ralf Stewart, the wife of said postmaster.

== Notable people ==
- Larry Gene Bell (1949-1996), murderer and suspected serial killer; born in Ralph
- Lillie Leatherwood (born 1964), athlete; raised in Ralph
- Walter Roland (1902 or 1903-1972), American blues, boogie-woogie and jazz pianist, guitarist and singer; born in Ralph
- Will Roberts (2011-2026), 15 year old boy who was known for raising money for cancer, with the help of Dr. Oz and President Donald Trump, from Ralph
