= Couch potato =

Person who spends most of their free time sitting or lying on a couch

Illustration of a couch potato

A couch potato is a person who spends most of their free time sitting or lying on a couch. This stereotype often refers to a lazy and overweight person who watches a great deal of television. Generally speaking, the term refers to a lifestyle in which children or adults do not get enough physical activity.

== History ==
The actual term "couch potato" was first coined in 1976 by Tom Iacino, a friend of American underground comics artist Robert Armstrong. In the early-1980s, he registered the term as a trademark with the United States government; he also co-authored a book with Jack Mingo, called The Official Couch Potato Handbook, which delves into the lives of couch potatoes.

The term eventually entered common American vocabulary, generally defining one who unceasingly watches television. The phrase was entered into the Oxford English Dictionary in 1993.

== Health ==
Some studies have said that the "couch potato lifestyle" is a serious health hazard to its practitioners; in the United Kingdom, a plan of the Prime Minister's Strategy Unit tried attempts "to combat the couch potato culture" to "[improving the U.K.'s] international sporting performance."

Studies presented at the 2003 meeting of the American College of Sports Medicine suggested that there could be a genetic basis for the "couch potato lifestyle".

Research suggests that being a couch potato could make a person a decade older biologically than someone who is physically active.

== In popular culture ==
- Various activities have been designed for the couch potato, including a type of investment portfolio ("Couch Potato Portfolio") and fantasy football leagues.
- Greyhound dogs, who are well-known for their sprinting ability but otherwise require little exercise, are sometimes called "forty-five mile per hour couch potatoes" by adoption and rescue agencies.
- Music artist "Weird Al" Yankovic's song "Couch Potato" (a parody of "Lose Yourself" by Eminem) describes him watching hours upon hours of television, "until [his] legs are numb, [his] eyes bloodshot."
- The phrase has coined the spin-off mouse potato (or sometimes computer potato), meaning one who spends too much time in front of a computer.
- In the comedy movie Stay Tuned (1992), Roy Knable (John Ritter) was a couch potato who was sucked into a television world by an emissary from hell (Jeffrey Jones).
- Couch Potatoes was the name of a game show hosted by Double Dare host Marc Summers.
- Couch Potato was a Sunday morning kids TV show aired on the ABC in Australia in the 1990s.

== See also ==
- Laziness
- Sedentary lifestyle
