= Miss America 1987 =

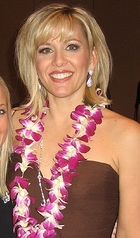
- Kellye Cash, Miss America 1987, in 2007
- Date: September 13, 1986
- Presenters: Gary Collins
- Venue: Boardwalk Hall, Atlantic City, New Jersey
- Broadcaster: NBC Network
- Entrants: 51
- Placements: 10
- Winner: Kellye Cash; Tennessee

Miss America 1987, the 60th Anniversary Miss America pageant, was held at the Boardwalk Hall in Atlantic City, New Jersey on September 13, 1986, on NBC Network.

Although an entry representing the city of Memphis had been victorious in the pageant of 1947, Kellye Cash became the first woman with the title Miss Tennessee to win the crown. She is a great-niece of the singer Johnny Cash. Third place finisher Dawn Elizabeth Smith is the sister of a murder victim by Larry Gene Bell, who would be executed for killing her sister.

== Results ==
=== Placements ===
Placement	Contestant
Miss America 1987	Tennessee – Kellye Cash
1st runner-up	Virginia – Julianne Smith
2nd runner-up	South Carolina – Dawn Elizabeth Smith
3rd runner-up	Michigan – Kelly Lynn Garver
4th runner-up	Missouri – Tamara Lynn Tungate
Top 10	Alabama – Angela Callahan; Arkansas – Julie Anne Russell; Georgia – Marlesa Ball; Mississippi – Kimberly McGuffee; Texas – Stephany Samone

=== Awards ===
==== Preliminary awards ====
Awards	Contestant
Lifestyle and Fitness	Missouri - Tamara Tungate; South Carolina - Dawn Elizabeth Smith (tie); Tennessee - Kellye Cash (tie); Virginia - Julianne Smith
Talent	Michigan - Kelly Garver; Tennessee - Kellye Cash; Texas - Stephany Samone

==== Non-finalist awards ====
Awards	Contestant
Talent	California - Lisa Kahre; Colorado - Carol Janson; Florida - Molly Scott Pesce; Hawaii - Cheryl Bartlett; Kentucky - Melinda Cumberledge; Louisiana - Amanda Mainord; Oklahoma - Mignon Merchant; Vermont - Michelle Shelley Dawson

== Contestants ==
State	Name	Hometown	Age	Talent	Placement	Special Awards	Notes
Alabama	Angela Callahan	Birmingham	20	Piano, "The Windmills of Your Mind"	Top 10		
Alaska	Jerri Morrison	Anchorage	22	Tap Dance			
Arizona	Terri Kettunen	Yuma	21	Classical Piano			Sister of Miss Arizona 1989, Tammy Kettunen
Arkansas	Julie Russell	Fort Smith	22	Classical Piano with Narration	Top 10		
California	Lisa Kahre	Salinas	19	Flute, "Carnival of Venice"		Non-finalist Talent Award	
Colorado	Carol Janson	Boulder	21	Piano, "Revolutionary Etude"		Non-finalist Talent Award	
Connecticut	Lorraine Hudson	North Haven	24	Vocal, "Something's Coming" from West Side Story			
Delaware	Lori Ann Scott	Wilmington	23	Popular Vocal, "Love is Spreading All Over"			
(Washington, D.C.) District of Columbia	Karen Watson	Arlington, VA	25	Classical Ballet en Pointe			
Florida	Molly Pesce	Longwood	23	Vocal Medley from Cabaret		Non-finalist Talent Award	
(Georgia (U.S. state)) Georgia	Marlesa Ball	Thomasville	23	Vocal, "Amazing Grace"	Top 10		
Hawaii	Cheryl Bartlett	Honolulu	23	Vocal, "America the Beautiful"		Non-finalist Talent Award	
Idaho	Jennifer Hovey	Twin Falls	19	Violin			
Illinois	Lisa Heussner	Pekin	21	Dramatic Interpretation, "Emily Dickinson, Portrait of a Poet"			
Indiana	Susan Sailor	Elkhart	20	Piano			
Iowa	Darcy Benton	Delmar	19	Vocal, "Someone to Watch Over Me"			
Kansas	Heather Lynn Clark	Benton	23	Vocal & Sign Language, "I'll Never Say Goodbye"			
Kentucky	Melinda Cumberledge	Lexington	23	Semi-classical Vocal, "Till There was You"		Non-finalist Talent Award	
Louisiana	Amanda Mainord	Baton Rouge	20	Vocal, "When You Wish Upon a Star"		Non-finalist Talent Award	
Maine	Victoria Reed	Falmouth	26	Vocal, "Can't Help Lovin' Dat Man"			
Maryland	Katrina Owens	Pikesville	24	Jazz Dance			
Massachusetts	Kathleen Callahan	Revere	23	Popular Vocal, "Come Rain or Come Shine"			
Michigan	Kelly Lynn Garver	Farmington Hills	23	Fiddle Medley, "Orange Blossom Special" & "New Country"	3rd runner-up	Preliminary Talent Award	
Minnesota	Kristine Fouks	Stillwater	23	Vocal			
Mississippi	Kimberly McGuffee	Mendenhall	23	Popular Vocal, "Inseparable"	Top 10		
Missouri	Tamara Tungate	St. Peters	21	Vocal, "Don't Rain on My Parade" from Funny Girl	4th runner-up	Preliminary Lifestyle & Fitness Award	
Montana	Kamala Compton	Havre	21	Gymnastics Dance			
Nebraska	Donna Schieffer	Columbus	19	Modern Dance			
Nevada	Kelsey Kara	Las Vegas	23	Flamenco Dance			
New Hampshire	Lisa Vandecasteele	Salem	22	Dance/Baton Twirling			
New Jersey	Karyn Zosche	Pine Brook	25	Piano, Rhapsody in Blue			
New Mexico	Emily Franklin	Albuquerque	19	Vocal Medley			
(New York (state)) New York	Dawan McPeak	New York City	25	Gymnastics Dance			Later Mrs. Texas 2001
North Carolina	Karen Bloomquist	Durham	22	Piano			
North Dakota	Barbara Kerzman	Minot	23	Semi-classical Vocal, "Love is Where You Find It"			
Ohio	Mary Zilba	Toledo	22	Vocal, "My Mammy"			Sister of Miss Ohio 1981, Juliana Zilba Later appeared on The Real Housewives of Vancouver
Oklahoma	Mignon Merchant	Oklahoma City	25	Stand-up Comedy		Non-finalist Talent Award	Previously Miss Oklahoma USA 1983 Top 10 at Miss USA 1983
Oregon	Jana Svea Peterson	Newport	22	Vocal Medley			
Pennsylvania	Darlene Deeley	Philadelphia	25	Gymnastics/Dance Routine			
Rhode Island	Toni Langello	Warwick	20	Vocal, "My Man"			
South Carolina	Dawn Smith	Columbia	22	Classical Vocal, "Je Veux Vivre" from Roméo et Juliette	2nd runner-up	Preliminary Lifestyle & Fitness Award	Sister was brutally murdered a year prior to her winning Miss South Carolina (events later made into investigative documentary dramas) Won "Miss Pageant Rewind" on What Not to Wear against two fellow pageant contestants
South Dakota	Julie Hedin	Watertown	21	Flute			
Tennessee	Kellye Cash	Milan	21	Piano/Vocal, "I'll Be Home"	Winner	Preliminary Lifestyle & Fitness Award Preliminary Talent Award	Mother of Miss Virginia 2021, Tatum Shepard
Texas	Stephany Samone	Dallas	25	Country Vocal, "Stand by Your Man"	Top 10	Preliminary Talent Award	
Utah	Donna Clark	Salt Lake City	22	Ballet			
Vermont	Michelle Dawson	Charlotte	18	Vocal, "I Could Have Danced All Night" from My Fair Lady		Non-finalist Talent Award	
Virginia	Julianne Smith	Yorktown	21	Vocal, "Golden Rainbow"	1st runner-up	Preliminary Lifestyle & Fitness Award	
(Washington (state)) Washington	Melanie Cobb	Vancouver	24	Vocal, "Let's Hear it for Me" from Funny Lady			
West Virginia	Shannon Barill	Charleston	23	Jazz en Pointe			
Wisconsin	Mara Nesemann	Brookfield	20	Gymnastics Dance Routine, "1980"			
Wyoming	Lacy J. Reeves	Laramie	22	Vocal, "You're Gonna Hear from Me" from Inside Daisy Clover			
