= Dorsey Dixon =

American songwriter and musician

- Born: Dorsey Murdock Dixon; October 14, 1897; Darlington, South Carolina, United States
- Died: April 18, 1968 (aged 70) Plant City, Florida, United States
- Genres: Old-time music, country music
- Occupations: Musician, songwriter, millworker
- Instruments: Guitar, violin
- Years active: 1930–64
- Label: RCA Victor

Dorsey Murdock Dixon (October 14, 1897 – April 18, 1968) was an American old-time and country music songwriter and musician. He was also a millworker who spent much of his life working in textile mills in North and South Carolina. Dixon's best known songs were "Wreck on the Highway", which resulted in a copyright dispute with country musician Roy Acuff, and "Babies in the Mill", which was about the Southern textile industry's exploitation of child labor in the early 20th century.

== Biography ==
Dixon was born on October 14, 1897, in Darlington, South Carolina. He was one of seven children, all of whom, together with their father, worked at the local textile mill, Darlington Cotton Manufacturing Company. Dixon left school at the age of twelve to start working at the mill; his younger brother Howard (1903-1961) started at the age of ten, and their sister Nancy (1892-1973) began working there as a spinner at the age of eight. Dixon's family and friends encouraged homemade music and he quickly picked up the traditional and sentimental songs they sang. A family friend and school teacher gave Dixon violin lessons and by the time he was 14 he could also play the guitar. During World War I, Dixon and his brother Howard were employed by the Atlantic Coast Line Railroad in Darlington as signalmen, but lost their jobs in 1919 along with thousands of mill workers. Dorsey found work for a while at a mill in Lancaster, South Carolina, before moving to East Rockingham, North Carolina, in 1927 to work at the Aleo Mill. Dixon's parents and Nancy and Howard also moved to East Rockingham to join him. There Dixon married fellow mill worker Beatrice Lucele Moody, later having four children with her.

In 1929 Dixon tried his hand at composition, writing a poem about a school house fire. When Howard and his mother noted that the words could be sung to a popular hymn at the time, "Life's Railway to Heaven", Dixon began devoting his spare time to composing. His writing often drew on first-hand experiences, particularly the working conditions in the mills. During this period he produced songs like "Weaver's Life", "Spinning Room Blues" and "Weave Room Blues", some of which were sung by mill strikers during labor unrest in the early 1930s. Dixon and his brother also started performing as a duo at local functions around Rockingham, with Dorsey playing guitar and Howard playing fiddle. In 1931 country musician Jimmie Tarlton passed through East Rockingham and so impressed the Dixon brothers that they changed their performances. Howard switched from fiddle to Hawaiian guitar and Dorsey played his guitar with a "unique finger-picking style". Interest in the duo grew in 1934 when they started performing regularly on J. W. Fincher's Crazy Water Crystals Saturday Night Jamboree on WBT, a radio station in Charlotte, North Carolina.

In 1936 an RCA Victor field crew started recording the Dixon Brothers in Charlotte, and over the next few years a total of 61 songs were released. The Dixon Brothers' records sold well enough that they were able to record during five separate sessions for RCA Victor from 1936 – 1938. During two sessions in 1937 and 1938, Dorsey recorded as a duet with his wife Beatrice. One of his songs, "I Didn't Hear Anybody Pray", about a fatal car accident and recorded by the Dixon brothers in 1938, was recorded as "The Wreck on the Highway" by country musician Roy Acuff in 1942. Acuff could not remember where he knew the song from, but claimed it as his own. "Wreck on the Highway" became a national country music hit, but Dixon received no royalties. In the mid-1940s, and at his family's insistence, Dixon asked a lawyer to file a lawsuit against Acuff, and in 1946 an out-of-court settlement was reached. Dixon was granted ownership of "Wreck on the Highway", a third of the existing $5,000 royalties, and an "undisclosed percentage" of future royalties. Dixon later adopted Acuff's title, and "Wreck on the Highway" became his "best-known and arguably his greatest composition". Bruce Springsteen also wrote a song called "Wreck on the Highway" in 1980, and although a different song, it borrowed "its title and its melodrama" from Acuff's hit.

Expecting further settlements the Dixon family moved to New York City in 1947 where Dixon worked in a Union City, New Jersey rayon factory, but none were forthcoming and they moved back to East Rockingham. With Dixon's musical career all but over, he continued working at the Aleo Mill until 1951 when he was forced to retire due to his deteriorating eyesight. Dixon and his wife then moved to Baltimore, but they separated in 1953 and he returned to East Rockingham without her. Dixon's brother, Howard continued working in the mills until he died on the job following a heart attack in 1961.

Interest in Dixon's music was revived in the late 1950s by students of hillbilly and work song. In the early 1960s folkloristics Archie Green and Eugene Earle visited Dixon and helped him record a 19-track album, Babies in the Mill. The title track was a new composition by Dixon that was about the Southern textile industry's "shameful abuse and exploitation" of child labor in the early 20th century. They also persuaded him to start performing again and invited him to play at the 1963 Newport Folk Festival, where folk singer Pete Seeger introduced Dixon to the audience. Later Dixon was also asked to have his music recorded for the Archive of American Folk Song at the US Library of Congress. Dixon's brief musical comeback came to an end in 1964 when he had several heart attacks. He relocated to Plant City, Florida, to live with his son, the Reverend Dorsey Dixon, Jr., where he remained until his death of heart failure at the age 70 on April 18, 1968. In 2000 the Center for the Study of Southern Culture published autobiographical writings of Dixon entitled "I Don't Want Nothin' 'Bout my Life Wrote Out, Because I Had it Too Rough in Life".

== Discographical data ==
Year	Title	Label	Number	Notes
1973?	Beyond Black Smoke	Country Turtle	CT-6000	Dixon Brothers, notes by Pat Conte
1983	The Dixon Brothers Vol. 1	Old Homestead	OHCS-151	
1984	The Dixon Brothers Vol. 2	Old Homestead	OHCS-164	notes by Ivan Tribe
c.1984	The Dixon Bros.: Ramblin' & Gamblin'	Country Turtle	CT-6002	notes by Pat Conte with David Crisp
1986	The Dixon Brothers Vol. 3: Early Sacred Songs	Old Homestead	OHCS-178	notes by John Morris
1987	The Dixon Brothers Vol. 4	Old Homestead	OHCS-179	notes by John Norris
1998	Babies in the Mill	Testament	T-3301	Dorsey, Howard & Nancy Dixon, notes by Archie Green
2000	The Dixon Brothers Complete Recorded Works Vol. 1 (1936)	Document	DOCD-8046	notes by Keith Briggs
2000	The Dixon Brothers Complete Recorded Works Vol. 2 (1937)	Document	DOCD-8047	notes by Keith Briggs
2001	The Dixon Brothers Complete Recorded Works Vol. 3 (1937–38)	Document	DOCD-8048	notes by Keith Briggs
2001	The Dixon Brothers Complete Recorded Works Vol. 4 (1938)	Document	DOCD-8049	notes by Keith Briggs
2003	How Can a Broke Man Be Happy?	Acrobat	ACMCD4022	Dixon Brothers
2011	The Dixon Brothers with The Callahan Brothers	JSP	JSPCD 77113	4-CD set
2012	The Dixon Brothers: A Blessing To People	Bear Family	BCD16817	4-CD set with 164 page book by Patrick Huber

== Cited works ==
- Huber, Patrick (2008). "The Dixon Brothers, Howard and Dorsey". Linthead stomp: the creation of country music in the Piedmont South. University of North Carolina Press. pp. 216–274. ISBN 978-0-8078-3225-7.
