= Black Snake Moan (film) =

2006 film by Craig Brewer

- Theatrical release poster
- Directed by: Craig Brewer
- Written by: Craig Brewer
- Produced by: Stephanie Allain; John Singleton
- Starring: Samuel L. Jackson; Christina Ricci; Justin Timberlake; S. Epatha Merkerson
- Cinematography: Amy Vincent
- Edited by: Billy Fox
- Music by: Scott Bomar
- Production companies: New Deal Productions; Southern Cross the Dog Productions
- Distributed by: Paramount Vantage
- Release dates: December 9, 2006 (Butt-Numb-A-Thon); March 2, 2007 (United States)
- Running time: 116 minutes
- Country: United States
- Language: English
- Budget: $15 million
- Box office: $10.9 million

Black Snake Moan is a 2006 American drama film written and directed by Craig Brewer. It stars Christina Ricci, Samuel L. Jackson, and Justin Timberlake. Its plot focuses on a Tennessee farmer and bluesman (Jackson) who holds a troubled local (Ricci) woman captive in his farmhouse in an attempt to cure her of nymphomania. The title derives from the 1927 Blind Lemon Jefferson song. The film draws numerous references to the Mississippi Blues movement, particularly in its title and soundtrack. The film was shot in and around the city of Memphis, Tennessee.

Black Snake Moan premiered at Butt-Numb-A-Thon on December 9, 2006, before being released by Paramount Vantage on March 2, 2007, in the United States. It garnered mixed reviews and was a box-office bomb, grossing only $10.9 million against a $15 million budget.

== Plot ==
The film concerns two main characters: Lazarus Redd, a deeply religious farmer and former blues guitarist, and Rae Doole, a young sex addict. Lazarus' wife and his brother were having an affair, which has left him bitter and angry. Rae's boyfriend, Ronnie Morgan, leaves for deployment with the 196th Field Artillery Brigade, Tennessee National Guard, and in his absence, she indulges in bouts of promiscuity and drug use. During one of her binges, Ronnie's friend Gill Morton tries to take advantage of her. She laughs at his advances and compares his penile endowment unfavorably with another man's, and he beats her severely. Believing she's dead, Gill pushes the unconscious Rae out of his truck at the side of the road, wearing only a crop top and underwear, and drives away.

Lazarus discovers Rae unconscious by the road the next morning and brings her home to nurse her back to health. He goes to see Tehronne – the man he thought had beaten her – and learns of her promiscuity. Over the course of several days, Rae, delirious with fever, occasionally wakes up and tries to flee from Lazarus. He chains her to a radiator to keep her from running away. After she regains her wits, Lazarus announces that it is his spiritual duty to heal her of her sinful ways and refuses to release her until he does so. Rae makes several attempts to escape, and even attempts to rape a teenager who helps out on Lazarus' farm when he pays a visit.

She eventually comes to tolerate her position. Lazarus buys her a light sundress to wear, improving her modesty, plays the guitar for her, and feeds her home-cooked meals. Lazarus' pastor and close friend, R.L., visits Lazarus at his house and discovers that Lazarus is imprisoning Rae. The pastor tries to reason with Lazarus, and the group shares a meal.

Meanwhile, Ronnie returns to town after being discharged from the National Guard due to his severe anxiety disorder. While searching for Rae, who has disappeared, he meets Gill, who tells him that Rae cheats on him when he is out of town. Ronnie attacks Gill, steals his truck, and continues searching for Rae.

In the morning, Lazarus frees Rae, having decided that he has no right to pass judgment on her. She chooses to stay with him of her own will. That night during a thunderstorm, at Rae's request, Lazarus sings a song for her, "That Black Snake Moan" by Blind Lemon Jefferson. Later, she and Lazarus take a trip into town, where Rae confronts her mother about the sexual abuse she suffered at the hands of her mother's husband. Meanwhile, Lazarus has formed a budding romance with the local pharmacist, Angela. He plays a blues concert at a local bar, which Rae attends. Ronnie spots Rae and follows her to Lazarus' house. He confronts the pair with a pistol, but Lazarus talks him down and summons the pastor. Ronnie and Rae decide they are stronger together than apart and get married. While driving away, Ronnie suffers from a panic attack again, and Rae begins to have one of her spells, but then they pull themselves together and resolve to take care of each other.

== Cast ==
- Christina Ricci as Rae Doole
- Samuel L. Jackson as Lazarus Redd
- Justin Timberlake as Ronnie Morgan
- John Cothran Jr. as R.L.
- S. Epatha Merkerson as Angela
- David Banner as Tehronne
- Kim Richards as Sandy Doole
- Son House (archive footage) as himself
- Neimus K. Williams as Lincoln James
- Michael Raymond-James as Gill Morton
- Adriane Lenox as Rose Woods
- Leonard L. Thomas as Deke Woods
- Jeff Pope as Batson
- Amy LaVere as Jesse
- Clare Grant as Kell
- Charles Pitts as Charlie

== Production ==
Jackson spent time every day for six or seven months learning how to play the blues guitar. During filming, Ricci wore an actual 40-pound (18 kg) chain that stretched 30 to 40 feet, and ate only foods of no nutritional value to achieve a sickly appearance. She told Entertainment Weekly that she remained scantily clad even when the cameras were not rolling: "Sam [Jackson] would be like, 'Put some clothes on!' I was like, 'No, you don't understand. I'm doing something important.'" Jackson stated in an interview that he got used to her wardrobe quickly.

Christina Ricci said the rough sex scenes were painful, partly because David Banner had no previous acting experience. In one scene with Banner, Ricci said, "I was being hurt. It kind of felt like being raped. It was hard. I felt terrible, but it wasn't Dave's fault at all."

== Marketing ==
In April 2008, Ricci commented on the promotional poster for the film, criticizing it as exploitative of women:

The way that movie was marketed was probably one of the most disappointing and upsetting things that's ever happened to me in my career. I have no interest in exploiting women any further than they've already been exploited...All they [marketing bosses] cared about was college-age boys going to see it.

Feministing criticized the marketing for its portrayal of sexualized violence, although the author had not seen the film itself.

== Reception ==
During its March 2–4, 2007 opening weekend in the US, Black Snake Moan earned $4 million, putting it in eighth place behind films including other new releases Wild Hogs and Zodiac. On Rotten Tomatoes, it has a 66% approval rating based on 164 reviews, with an average score of 6.4/10. The website's critical consensus reads, "Uninhibited performances, skillful direction, and a killer blues soundtrack elevate Black Snake Moan beyond its outlandish premise." On Metacritic, the film has an average score of 52 out of 100, based on 34 critics, indicating "mixed or average" reviews.

On the television program Ebert & Roeper, filmmaker Kevin Smith, filling in for Roger Ebert, described the film as the best of the year thus far. Smith praised Ricci and Jackson, saying this was Ricci's best performance and Jackson's best performance since Pulp Fiction (1994). Richard Roeper also gave the film a "thumb up" rating. Matt Glasby of Film4 awarded it one out of five, calling it a "pressure-cooked mess" that was "bad enough to make gums bleed". Rolling Stone's Peter Travers declared the film the year's Worst Soft-Core Sex on his list of the Worst Movies of 2007.

== Soundtrack ==
Glenn Gaslin at Moving Pictures Magazine praised the soundtrack album. Chad Grischow at IGN reviewed the album at length, concluding with, "The album does an excellent job at capturing the sweaty underbelly of the southern blues scene, and is a recommended listen, even if not for the reasons you originally picked it up."

On February 16, 2007, Sarah Linn of Sound the Sirens Magazine wrote in her final paragraph,

As a stand-alone album, these 17 tracks are sure to give anybody, blues fan or not, a major taste of what blues music embodies: human struggle. Rootsy and spiritual, down-and-out but hopeful, each track is drunk and steeped on old-time blues, and can be best summed up by the "Father of the Delta Blues," Son House. He says this on the blues: "Sometimes that kind of blues will make you even kill one another ... or do anything, that kind of low ... that's where the blues started."

James B. Eldred at Bullz-Eye.com concluded his favorable review with,

Blues fans, indie rockers, and those who worship at the Church of Jackson should pick up this soundtrack. Not only does it prove that one of film's great hard-asses can sing, it's also a great introduction to the blues, both classic and modern.
