= Jack Mingo =

American author and journalist

Jack Mingo (born 1952) is an American author, journalist and beekeeper. He has written Bees Make the Best Pets, The Juicy Parts, and The Couch Potato Handbook. He and a small group of media hoaxers trademarked and popularized the term couch potato. He has written for The New York Times, The Washington Post, and Reader's Digest. He and Erin Barrett were co-founders and co-writers of the Ask Jeeves series of trivia books, which published selected "questions as they flowed, unedited, into the well-known Web site".

== Personal life ==
Mingo was born to Vera and Glen Mingo in Wausau, Wisconsin. He lives in Alameda, California. He has a daughter (Elana) from a former marriage and three grandsons, Acton, Oak, and Elm.

== Works and publications ==
- Bees Make the Best Pets (2013) ISBN 1573246255
- Ben Franklin's Guide to Wealth (2004) ISBN 157324953X
- The Juicy Parts (1996) ISBN 0399522182
- How the Cadillac Got Its Fins (1995) ISBN 0887307531

=== With Erin Barrett ===
- Cause of Death: A Perfect Little Guide to What Kills Us (2009) ISBN 1416554793
- Random Kinds Of Factness: 1001 (or So) Absolutely True Tidbits About (Mostly) Everything (2005) ISBN 1573242128
- Just Curious about Science, Jeeves (2003) ISBN 0743427114
- It Takes a Certain Type to be a Writer: Facts from the World of Writing and Publishing (2003) ISBN 1573247227
- Just Curious About History, Jeeves (2002) ISBN 0743427092
- Just Curious About Animals and Nature, Jeeves (2002) ISBN 0743427106
- Doctors Killed George Washington: Hundreds of Fascinating Facts from the World of Medicine (2002) ISBN 1573247197
- Not Another Apple for the Teacher: Hundreds of Fascinating Facts from the World of Education (2002) ISBN 1573247235
- Just Curious, Jeeves: What Are the 1001 Most Intriguing Questions Asked on the Internet? (2000) ISBN 193010801X

=== With Warren Dotz ===
- Firecrackers!: An Eye-Popping Collection of Chinese Firework Art (2008) ISBN 1580089038
- Firecrackers: The Art and History (2000) ISBN 1580081517
