= Marley's Ghost (band) =

Bluegrass band

- Genres: Folk music, gospel music, country music, bluegrass music
- Years active: 1986–present
- Labels: Sage Arts
- Members: Mike Phelan; Ed Littlefield Jr. Dan Wheetman; Jon Wilcox; Jerry Fletcher; Bob Nichols
- Website: www.marleysghost.com

Marley's Ghost is a band based in Washington and Northern California which has existed since the mid-1980s and has recorded 12 albums. While their music has a strong bluegrass emphasis, their musical style is diverse. Paste magazine has described them as "a decidedly unusual band, as capable of reanimating Appalachian folk songs as they are traditional Celtic fare, honky tonk and reggae."

== History ==
Dan Wheetman, Jon Wilcox, and Mike Phelan met in March 1986 in the San Fernando Valley during Saint Patrick's Day shows. That winter, Wheetman went to Littlefield's studio to record a solo album, bringing Wilcox and Phelan. They ended up recording the first three Marley's Ghost albums before completing Wheetman's solo album.

In 2006, Van Dyke Parks produced Spooked, and artist Robert Crumb illustrated the album cover. (Crumb and Wheetman knew each other from an earlier musical venture, R. Crumb & His Cheap Suit Serenaders, of which Wheetman was a member for a short time in the mid-1970s.) Guests on the recording included Bill Frisell (guitar), Buell Neidlinger (bass), and Don Heffington (drums).

Released in 2012, Jubilee was produced by Cowboy Jack Clement, and includes performances by Emmylou Harris, John Prine, Marty Stuart, and Old Crow Medicine Show.

2017's The Woodstock Sessions was recorded at Levon Helm’s studio in Woodstock, New York. Larry Campbell produced this album of mostly traditional music.

2019's Travelin' Shoes was also produced by Larry Campbell and features a host of gone-world gospel gems.

== Personnel ==
- Mike Phelan: Guitars, Dobro, bass, fiddle, lead & harmony vocals, writer.
- Ed Littlefield Jr.: Pedal steel, guitars, bass, fiddle, Highland bagpipes lead & bass vocals
- Dan Wheetman: Bass, National Steel, Fiddle, Guitar, lead & harmony vocals, writer.
- Jon Wilcox: Mandolin, guitar, Irish bouzouki lead & harmony vocals, writer
- Jerry Fletcher: Keyboards, harmony vocals
- Bob Nichols: Drums, percussion

== Discography ==
- 1987: Haunting Melodies (Sage Arts)
- 1989: Let De Groove Rise Up (Sage Arts) - remixed and remastered in 2005
- 1991: Ghost Country (Sage Arts)
- 1992: How Can I Keep From Singing: Gospel (Sage Arts)
- 1996: Four Spacious Guys (Sage Arts)
- 1998: Across the River (Sage Arts)
- 2001: Live at the Freight (Sage Arts)
- 2006: Spooked (Sage Arts)
- 2010: Ghost Town (Sage Arts)
- 2012: Jubilee (Sage Arts)
- 2016: The Woodstock Sessions (Sage Arts)
- 2019: Travelin' Shoes (Sage Arts)
