= Origin Jazz Library =

- Founded: 1960
- Founder: Bill Givens; Pete Whelan
- Genre: Jazz, blues
- Country of origin: U.S.
- Location: Thousand Oaks, California
- Official website: www.originjazz.com

Origin Jazz Library is an independent record label established by Bill Givens and Pete Whelan in 1960 to reissue blues from the 1920s and 1930s. Today the label specializes in reissues of jazz, western swing, folk music, and ragtime.

Origin's first release was The Immortal Charley Patton. Whelan bowed out of the company in 1967. Givens issued records into the 1990s. Issues slowed due to competition from Yazoo Records, both drawing from the same collection of music. When Givens died in 1999, the label was taken over by Cary Ginell and Michael Kieffer.

Origin's catalog consists of 16 titles, including the "Bix Restored" series (now five volumes) and the "Western Swing Chronicles" series, documenting the early years of western swing in the 1930s and 1940s.

== See also ==
- List of record labels
