= That Black Snake Moan =

1926 song performed by Blind Lemon Jefferson

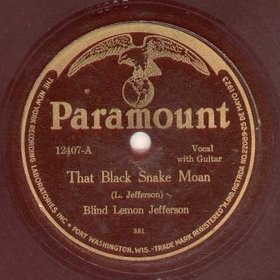

Single by Blind Lemon Jefferson
- B-side: "Stocking Feet Blues"; "Matchbox Blues" (re-release)
- Released: October 1926; March 1927 (re-release)
- Recorded: 1926
- Genre: Country blues
- Length: 3:04
- Label: Paramount; Okeh
- Songwriter(s): Blind Lemon Jefferson
- Producer(s): J. Mayo Williams

Blind Lemon Jefferson singles chronology
"Bad Luck Blues" (1926)	"That Black Snake Moan" (1926)	"Booger Rooger Blues" (1926)

"That Black Snake Moan" is a song written and recorded by American country blues musician Blind Lemon Jefferson. Inspired by singer Victoria Spivey's "Black Snake Blues", the song was released on Paramount Records in 1926, and has since become recognized as a signature composition which exemplifies Jefferson's unconventional melodic style and utilization of double entendres. The song was re-recorded a year later as "Black Snake Moan" for Okeh Records, and both versions have remained accessible through the availability of several compilation albums.

== Background ==
During the 1920s, Paramount Records were in-demand for customers of genuine country blues recordings. Blind Lemon Jefferson had been performing across Texas and the Mississippi Delta since 1912 and garnered a considerable following. Jefferson was signed to Paramount in 1925 as a result of one of two proposed scenarios: pianist Sammy Price recommended him to the label or Paramount music director Arthur C. Laibly discovered Jefferson performing on Dallas streets. Regardless, a talent scout recorded demos with Jefferson and the singer traveled to Chicago to record his first official sides: a pair of gospel tunes under the pseudonym Deacon L. J. Bates. Sales were strong, prompting further sessions with Jefferson in 1926.

In his third session for Paramount, Jefferson recorded "That Black Snake Moan", along with "Black Horse Blues", "Corina Blues", and "Jack O' Diamond Blues". Riddled with sexual nuances, lyrically "That Black Snake Moan" was explicit with its intentions, with lines such as "Mmm, black snake crawlin' in my room / And some pretty mama had better come and get this black snake soon". Record producer J. Mayo Williams recalled Jefferson was "just as cool and collected as any artist I've ever seen" as they carried out the session. Indeed, Jefferson's calm and collected persona coupled with high-pitched howls added to the song's sexual innuendo. Jefferson was inspired to compose the song after singer Victoria Spivey enjoyed success with "Black Snake Blues", a tune that Spivey insists was not intended to have the same sexual innuendo as Jefferson's "That Black Snake Moan".

"That Black Snake Moan" was first released on Paramount in October 1926. Jefferson re-recorded another version of the song for Okeh Records, which was closely related to the original rendition, but also had superior sound quality. This version, titled simply "Black Snake Moan", was released in March 1927 along with another well-known Jefferson tune "Matchbox Blues". The composition has remained relatively accessible throughout the years, appearing on Jefferson compilation albums such as The Immortal Blind Lemon, Black Snake Moan, and King of the Blues.
