= Blue Goose Records =

Blue Goose Records was an American independent record label set up in the early 1970s by Nick Perls.

While on Blue Goose's sister label, Yazoo Records, Perls compiled rare 78 rpm recordings from the 1920s by Charley Patton, Blind Willie McTell, Memphis Jug Band, Blind Blake, and Blind Lemon Jefferson. On Blue Goose Records he recorded not only 'rediscovered' black blues artists like Sam Chatmon, Son House, Yank Rachell, Shirley Griffith and Thomas Shaw, but also younger blues and jazz performers, including Larry Johnson, Jo Ann Kelly, Woody Mann, John Lewis, Roy Book Binder, R. Crumb & His Cheap Suit Serenaders, Rory Block, Roger Hubbard, Alan Seidler, and Brett Marvin and the Thunderbolts' member Graham Hine.

Most of the Blue Goose Records albums were re-released in 2002 on CD by the Japanese record company, Air Mail Recordings.

== See also ==
- List of record labels
