= Lord, I Want to Be a Christian =

African American spiritual song

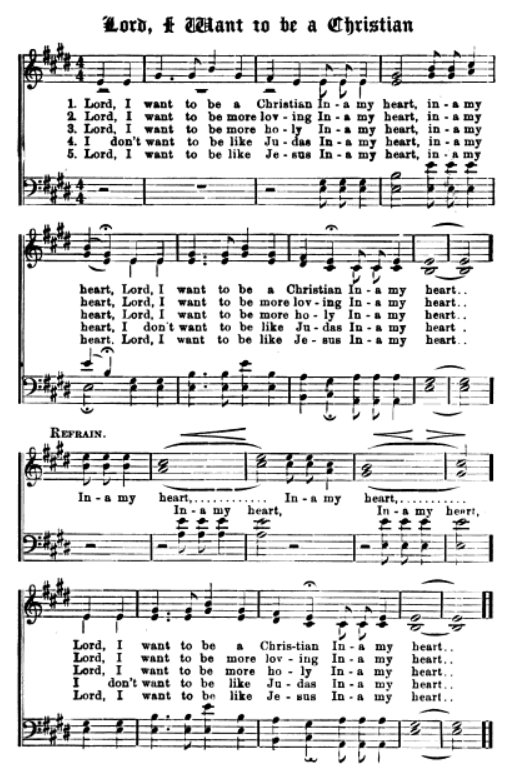
Sheet music for Lord, I Want to Be a Christian

Lord, I Want to Be a Christian is an African American spiritual. It was likely composed in 1750s Virginia by enslaved African-American persons exposed to the teaching of evangelist Samuel Davies. The music and lyrics were first printed in the 1907 Folk Songs of the American Negro, edited by Frederick J. Work. The song has been recorded by artists including Yolanda Adams, Chanticleer, Kirk Whalum, Hank Jones, Little Richard, Cassietta George, John Fahey, the Mormon Tabernacle Choir, Barbara Hendricks, James Cleveland and Blind Lemon Jefferson.

== Lyrics ==
Lord, I want to be a Christian in my heart, in my heart,
Lord, I want to be a Christian in my heart, in my heart.
In my heart, in my heart,
Lord, I want to be a Christian in my heart, in my heart.

Lord, I want to be more loving in my heart, in my heart,
Lord, I want to be more loving in my heart, in my heart.
In my heart, in my heart,
Lord, I want to be more loving in my heart, in my heart.

Lord, I want to be more holy in my heart, in my heart,
Lord, I want to be more holy in my heart, in my heart.
In my heart, in my heart,
Lord, I want to be more holy in my heart, in my heart.

Lord, I want to be like Jesus in my heart, in my heart,
Lord, I want to be like Jesus in my heart, in my heart.
In my heart, in my heart,
Lord, I want to be like Jesus in my heart, in my heart.

== See also ==
- Christian child's prayer § Spirituals
