= Ed Bell (musician) =

American songwriter

- Front cover of Mamlish LP S-3811

Background information
- Born: May 1905; Davis Plantation, Fort Deposit, Alabama, United States
- Died: 1960, 1965, or 1966 (aged around 54 to 61) Greenville, Alabama
- Genres: Country blues, Piedmont blues
- Occupations: Singer, songwriter, musician
- Instruments: Vocals, guitar
- Years active: 1920s–1940s
- Labels: Paramount; QRS; Columbia

Ed Bell (born May 1905, died 1960, 1965 or 1966) was an American Piedmont blues and country blues singer, guitarist and songwriter whose identity has only recently been verified by historians. Some of his records were released under the pseudonyms Sluefoot Joe and Barefoot Bill from Alabama. His best-remembered recording is "Mamlish Blues".

Colin Larkin noted in the Encyclopedia of Popular Music that "Bell stands as the most influential Alabama artist in pre-war blues recordings."

== Biography ==
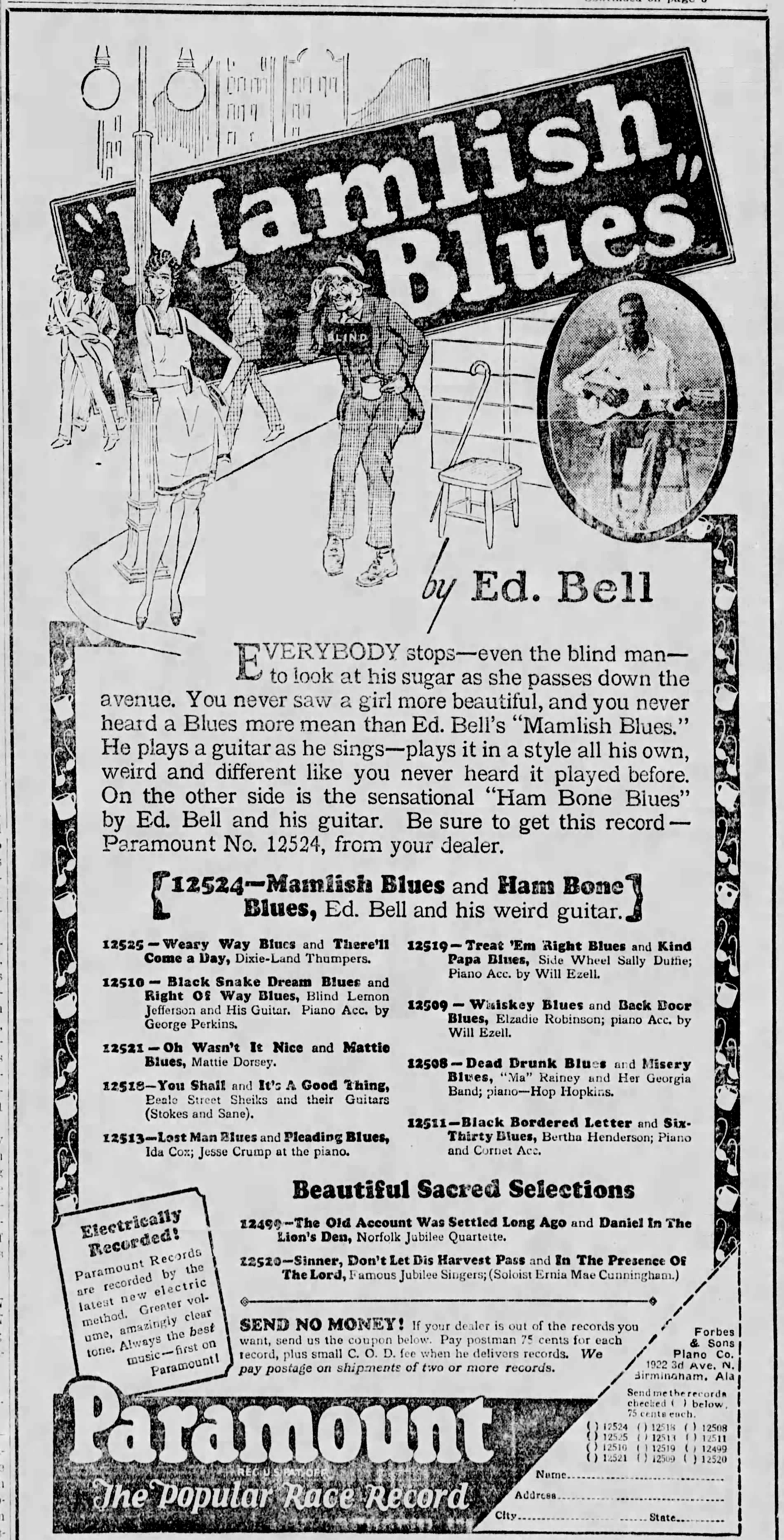
1927 newspaper ad for "Mamlish Blues" in The Birmingham Reporter

Bell was born on the Davis Plantation, near Fort Deposit, Alabama. As a child he moved with his family to Greenville, Alabama. An older cousin, Joe Pat Dean, took Bell to Muscle Shoals, Alabama, in 1919, where he learned to play the blues. In the early 1920s, Bell worked in agriculture and performed as a blues musician, often with his friend Pillie Bolling. He performed many times in Philadelphia and Ohio.

His debut recording, of his own songs "Mamlish Blues" and "The Hambone Blues," was part of a four-song session for Paramount Records in Chicago in 1927. The word mamlish is of unknown origin; it was used in several blues recordings of that period.

He next recorded in April 1929, cutting eight songs for QRS Records, billed on the releases as Sluefoot Joe, with Clifford Gibson playing guitar and piano. The rest of his recordings were made in Atlanta, Georgia, in 1929 and 1930, and released by Columbia Records; on these records, he was billed as Barefoot Bill from Alabama. Bell and Bolling played together on two tracks, "I Don't Like That" and "She's Got a Nice Line".

Bell's own songs of that time include "Squabbling Blues", recorded on April 20, 1930, in which the singer, close to death, asks that if people are unable to agree on who should have his body, then it should be thrown in the sea, so they would "quit squabblin' over me". Barefoot Bill's songs tend to themes of imprisonment and voodoo.

Eventually tiring of the life of a traveling blues musician, Bell became a Baptist preacher, married and settled in Montgomery, Alabama.

Bell died in Greenville in 1960, 1965 or 1966. One source suggests that he may have died during a civil rights march; other sources suggest that his death was due to natural causes, murder on account of his involvement in the civil rights movement, or black magic.

== Legacy ==
His influence has been noted in the 1970s work of John Lee.

== Compilation discography ==
- Ed Bell's Mamlish Moan (Mamlish, 1983)
- Complete Recorded Works in Chronological Order 1927–1930: Mamlish Blues (Document, 2008)

== See also ==
- Country blues
- List of Columbia Records artists
- List of country blues musicians
- List of Piedmont blues musicians
