= Yazoo Records =

Record label

- Parent company: Shanachie
- Founder: Nick Perls
- Genre: Blues, country, folk, gospel, jazz
- Country of origin: U.S.
- Location: Newton, New Jersey
- Official website: Yazoo at Shanachie

Yazoo Records is an American record label founded in the mid-1960s by Nick Perls. It specializes in early American blues, country, jazz, and other rural American genres collectively known as roots music.

== History ==
The Yazoo peacock

The first five releases (L 1001 to L 1005) were issued under the label name of Belzona Records. The label was then renamed Yazoo Records, and the first five releases were reissued under the new name.

The Belzona and Yazoo labels featured an Art Deco drawing of a peacock, adapted from the 1927 label of Black Patti Records.

For Yazoo Records Perls compiled rare 78-rpm recordings made in the 1920s by musicians such as Charley Patton, Blind Willie McTell, the Memphis Jug Band, Blind Blake, and Blind Lemon Jefferson. Perls founded a second label, Blue Goose Records, in 1970, for which he recorded "rediscovered" black blues artists and younger blues and jazz performers.

In 1987 Yazoo was acquired by Shanachie Records. In 2014, Yazoo signed its first current artists, The Reverend Peyton's Big Damn Band and released their album So Delicious on February 17, 2015.

== Artists ==
- Barbecue Bob
- Scrapper Blackwell
- Blind Blake
- Big Bill Broonzy
- Gus Cannon
- Bo Carter
- Reverend Gary Davis
- Sleepy John Estes
- Blind Boy Fuller
- Blind Uncle Gaspard
- Mississippi John Hurt
- Skip James
- Blind Lemon Jefferson
- Tommy Johnson
- Blind Willie Johnson
- Eddie Lang
- Furry Lewis
- Charley Lincoln
- Dennis McGee
- Blind Willie McTell
- Memphis Jug Band
- Mississippi Sheiks
- Charley Patton
- The Reverend Peyton's Big Damn Band
- Washington Phillips
- Ma Rainey
- Leo Soileau
- Charlie Spand
- Frank Stokes
- Roosevelt Sykes
- Tampa Red
- Henry Thomas
- Benny Thomasson
- Joe Venuti
- Peetie Wheatstraw
- Casey Bill Weldon
- Robert Wilkins

== See also ==
- List of record labels
