= Nick Perls =

J. Nicholas Perls (4 April 1942 – 22 July 1987) was an American audio engineer and the founder and owner of Yazoo Records and Blue Goose Records.

== Early life ==
Perls grew up in a Jewish family in Brooklyn, New York City. The family had achieved some wealth operating New York City's Perls Gallery.

Perls was one of a handful of serious East Coast collectors of 78-rpm country blues recordings during the 1960s. As a young man, he made two trips through the Deep South, where he knocked on doors seeking to acquire old blues records. He also was a frequent patron of antique shops in the New York area, always searching for rare blues records.

== Belzona Records ==
In 1967, Perls began re-recording the sides in his collection, using high-tech equipment in his home, and issuing 33-rpm record albums. These releases generally contained 14 blues tunes each and often included informative liner notes by his long-time collaborator, blues collector Steve Calt. The business was initially called Belzona Records. As a recording engineer, Perls's most renowned talent was his ability to ride a phonograph needle along the grooves of an old record in a way that Perls liked to describe as like riding a bobsled through an obstacle course, moving left, right, up or down to avoid as many scratches and gouges as possible. These album releases were always derived directly from 78-rpm shellac originals. By collecting and re-releasing such forgotten blues recordings, Perls preserved many classic blues performances (and later, those in related musical forms like ragtime) that otherwise might have been lost to the ages.

The following year, after the Belzona label had released 6 records, an injunction was issued on behalf of a longstanding Scottish record company called Beltona, on the grounds that the name "Belzona" was too similar and would confuse record distributors. Nick Perls then changed the label's name to Yazoo Records.

== Yazoo Records ==
Under the new name, Perls reissued all 6 of the Belzona recordings, with new labels and covers. He continued releasing the same type of 33-rpm recordings under the Yazoo name, conducting all operations out of his residence in the West Village in New York City.

Perls is pictured (in blackface) on the cover of the Yazoo recording Mr. Charlie's Blues.

Perls operated Yazoo Records as sole proprietor, occasionally hiring an assistant. The label stayed small and rarely caught much public attention beyond the hardcore blues devotees who eagerly awaited each new release. In the 1980s, Perls' health began deteriorating in the AIDS epidemic. The Yazoo brand was then acquired by Shanachie Records, which eventually re-released the Yazoo catalogue on CDs. Shanachie has continued to use the Yazoo name for this particular line of CDs, and has continued to release new Yazoo albums, initially with some contributions from Perls' collection of 78s.

== Blue Goose Records ==
In 1970, Perls started Blue Goose Records as a side project, using that label to release music by a variety of live performers that he recorded himself, often in his West Village living room. He was also a finger-pick guitarist but would only play the guitar socially, and strictly in imitation of one or another 1930s blues master. Stylistically, his playing ethos was summed up when he stated that the phrase "too choppy" is a contradiction in terms. His one foray as a recording artist can be heard as a duet on the song "My Game Blues", on the first Blue Goose release, Fast & Funky, by bluesman Larry Johnson.

During the early 1970s, Perls initiated a talent agency called Yellow Bee Productions, to help some of the blues performers on Blue Goose to get performance bookings. For about a year during this same period, Perls also used Yellow Bee to operate a juice bar where his performers could appear. Juice bars were a short-lived fad where no alcohol was served, no liquor licensing was required, and patrons could either bring their own liquor or go without, which was particularly popular among the hard drugs subculture of the time. With the closing of the juice bar, Perls also lost interest in the talent agency.

Blue Goose Records, boasting almost no well-known celebrity talent names, stayed an even smaller operation than Yazoo. One notable exception may have been Perls' three Blue Goose albums of R. Crumb & His Cheap Suit Serenaders, which were enormously entertaining recordings by the cartoonist (and collector of early jazz and blues records) Robert Crumb and several of his California friends. The last Blue Goose album, "Roy Smeck: Wizard of the Strings" was issued in 1980. Many of the Blue Goose releases were subsequently converted to compact disc format by a company in Japan whose name translates to Airmail Recordings. Some of these CDs are still available in the U.S. as collector's items.

Perls rarely broke even, financially, on any of his business endeavors. He would state that the "pop" big time did not appeal to him. He remained doggedly independent to the end.

== Personal life ==
According to John Ramsey, Nick's assistant in the mid-1970s, Perls was a verbose New Yorker who strived to be "outrageous", an adjective that he loved attributing to himself. For instance, for several years he made a habit of wearing different colored checkered socks, (such as green and yellow on one foot, red and white on the other), which he cited as evidence of insanity.

Further, Perls encouraged business acquaintances to refer to him as a "faggot", for the pure shock value. As explanation of this awkward request, Perls would claim that the term "homo"-sexual did not literally apply to him. The objects of his affections, young, effeminate black men, were not the same as him, rather literally "hetero" from him. Perls saw himself as a politically conservative, business man. In contrast, his personal lifestyle was built around "cruising" New York's 7th Avenue and picking up such individuals, leading to numerous short, intense relationships. Perls greatly enjoyed being seen in public arm in arm with his latest find, emphasizing the shock value of their intimacy.
