= R. Crumb & His Cheap Suit Serenaders =

American retro string band

- Origin: United States
- Genres: Old-time; ragtime; dixieland; country blues
- Years active: 1970s–present
- Labels: Blue Goose, Shanachie
- Members: Robert Armstrong; Al Dodge; Terry Zwigoff; Tony Marcus
- Past members: Robert Crumb; Bob Brozman; Dan Wheetman; Tom Marion

R. Crumb and his Cheap Suit Serenaders are an American retro string band playing songs from, and in the style of, the 1920s: old-time music, ragtime, "evergreen" jazz standards, western swing, country blues, Hawaiian, hokum, vaudeville and medicine show tunes. Underground cartoonist Robert Crumb was the band's frontman and album cover artist. Other members of the band include fellow cartoonist Robert Armstrong and filmmaker Terry Zwigoff (who directed the 1995 documentary Crumb).

== History ==
Crumb and Armstrong, who knew each other from the underground comics scene, realized that they both enjoyed listening to — and playing — music from the 1920s and 1930s. Bringing in Armstrong's old friend Al Dodge, they began playing together as a trio for fun. On a subsequent trip through Milwaukee, the group met with underground publisher Denis Kitchen, who offered them the chance to cut a 78 rpm record under the name R. Crumb and his Keep on Trucking Orchestra (a reference to Crumb's famous Keep on Truckin' comic strip, which itself was a riff on the Blind Boy Fuller song "Truckin' My Blues Away").

The 78 caught the attention of Blue Goose Records, which offered to produce and release an LP of the band, which had changed its name to the Cheap Suit Serenaders after "hurriedly buying suits at the Salvation Army in order to meet the minimum dress code required of the band at a posh wedding." R. Crumb and his Cheap Suit Serenaders released their first album in 1974.

Over time, the trio added Dan Wheetman (later of the band Marley's Ghost), Terry Zwigoff on cello, and Tom Marion on guitar and mandolin. In 1978, Tony Marcus replaced Marion. Also in 1978, guitarist Bob Brozman came in for the band's third album.

By the mid-1980s, the group played fewer live shows because Armstrong and Crumb had moved out of the Bay Area; by the mid-1990s Crumb had moved to France.

As of 2006, R. Crumb was no longer much involved with the group; the band at that time included Robert Armstrong (vocals, musical saw, guitar), Bob Brozman (vocals, various resonator instruments, guitar, ukulele), Al (Allan) Dodge (vocals, mandolin), Terry Zwigoff (saw, cello, Stroh violin, and mandolin), and Tony Marcus (vocals, guitar, and fiddle).

Brozman died in 2013; as of 2017, the other members of the group still play annually at the Freight and Salvage, a folk-oriented concert venue in Berkeley, California.

== Discography ==
The band's 33⅓ rpm albums, all recorded in the 1970s on the Blue Goose Records label, were titled R. Crumb and his Cheap Suit Serenaders (1974), R. Crumb and his Cheap Suit Serenaders No. 2 (1976), and R. Crumb and his Cheap Suit Serenaders No. 3 (1978); the latter two were reissued on the Shanachie Records label in 1993 as Chasin' Rainbows and Singing In the Bathtub respectively.

As a novelty, the band issued a number of 78 rpm 10-inch singles for Blue Goose, long after the format was obsolete. The most familiar is probably R. Crumb and his Cheap Suit Serenaders' Party Record (1980), with the double-entendre "My Girl's Pussy" on the "A" side and X-rated "Christopher Columbus" on the "B" side.

== In popular culture ==
The band is referenced in the 2001 film Ghost World, directed by Zwigoff. Enid asks Seymour about the band's second album, Chasin' Rainbows, and Seymour replies, "Nah, that one's not so great."

The Cheap Suit Serenaders songs "Chasin' Rainbows" and "Hula Medley" were both featured on the American Splendor (Original Motion Picture Soundtrack), released by New Line Records in 2003. (American Splendor is based on the writings of Harvey Pekar, with whom R. Crumb collaborated many times.)

The Cheap Suit Serenaders' version of "My Girl's Pussy" is used as the opening theme song of the Australian television comedy series Laid, which premiered in 2011.

== See also ==
- Eden and John's East River String Band
