= Roots 'n Blues: The Retrospective 1925–1950 =

Roots 'N Blues: The Retrospective 1925-1950 is a four-CD box set released on Columbia Records in June 1992. The collection features about five hours of early blues, folk/country and gospel recordings from a variety of American artists. Many of these recordings had never previously been issued in any medium. The liner notes were written by Lawrence Cohn and Pete Welding.

== Track listing ==
=== Disc one ===
1. Charlie Poole with the North Carolina Ramblers - "Whitehouse Blues" (3:25) (recorded September 20, 1926, in New York City, New York)
2. Aiken Country String Band - "High Sheriff" (2:53) (recorded September 19, 1927, in Winston-Salem, North Carolina)
3. Frank Hutchison - "The Last Scene of the Titanic" (3:30) (recorded April 29, 1927, in St. Louis, Missouri)
4. Hersal Thomas - "Suitcase Blues" (2:36) (recorded c. February 22, 1925, in Chicago, Illinois)
5. The Reverend J.M. Gates - "Death's Black Train is Coming" (3:11) (recorded April 24, 1926, in Atlanta, Georgia)
6. Dora Carr - "Cow Cow Blues" (2:50) (recorded October 1, 1925, in New York City, New York)
7. Vance's Tennessee Breakdowners - "Washington County Fox Chase" (2:57) (recorded September 22, 1927, in Winston-Salem, North Carolina)
8. Fiddlin' John Carson - "I'm Going to Take the Train to Charlotte" (3:05) (recorded August 10, 1928, in Atlanta, Georgia)
9. Ernest V. Stoneman's Trio - Untitled (3:01) (recorded January 1, 1927, in New York City, New York)
10. Whistler and His Jug Band - "Low Down Blues" (2:56) (recorded April 29, 1927, in St. Louis, Missouri)
11. Washington Phillips - "Paul and Silas in Jail" (2:42) (recorded December 2, 1927, in Dallas, Texas)
12. Barbecue Bob - "Blind Pig Blues" (3:02) (recorded April 13, 1928, in Atlanta, Georgia)
13. Austin and Lee Allen - "Chattanooga Blues" (3:04) (recorded November 4, 1927, in Atlanta, Georgia)
14. Sherman Tedder - Untitled (2:57) (recorded February 25, 1928, in Memphis, Tennessee)
15. Dallas String Band with Coley Jones - "Hokum Blues" (3:25) (recorded December 8, 1928, in Dallas, Texas)
16. Gladys Bentley - "Worried Blues" (2:45) (recorded August 8, 1928, in New York City, New York)
17. Elizabeth Johnson - "Empty Bed Blues, Part One" (3:02) (recorded June 26, 1928, in New York City, New York)
18. Elizabeth Johnson - "Empty Bed Blues, Part Two" (3:22) (recorded June 26, 1928, in New York City, New York)
19. South Georgia Highballers - "Blue Grass Twist" (2:48) (recorded October 5, 1927, in Atlanta, Georgia)
20. Charlie Bowman and His Brothers - "Moonshiner and His Money" (3:10) (recorded February 20, 1929, in New York City, New York)
21. Clarence Horton Greene - "Johnson City Blues" (2:57) (recorded October 15, 1928, in Johnson City, Tennessee)
22. The Reverend Johnny Blakey, assisted by the Sanctified Singers - "Warming By The Devil's Fire" (3:25) (recorded December 6, 1928, in Chicago, Illinois)
23. Papa Too Sweet & Harry Jones - "(Honey) It's Tight Like That" (2:36) (recorded December 11, 1928, in Chicago, Illinois)
24. Mississippi John Hurt - "Big Leg Blues" (2:51) (recorded December 21, 1928, in New York City, New York)
25. Daniels-Deason Sacred Harp Singers - "Hallelujah" (2:58) (recorded October 24, 1928, in Atlanta, Georgia)

=== Disc two ===
1. Herschel Brown and His Happy Five - "Liberty" (2:54) (recorded March 19, 1929, in Atlanta, Georgia)
2. Mamie Smith - "My Sportin' Man" (2:58) (recorded March 30, 1929, in New York City, New York)
3. Blues Birdhead - "Mean Low Blues" (3:13) (recorded October 13, 1929, in Richmond, Virginia)
4. Pink Anderson and Simmie Dooley - "C.C. & O. Blues" (3:05) (recorded April 14, 1928, in Atlanta, Georgia)
5. The OKeh Atlanta Sacred Harp Singers - "Ortonville" (3:11) (recorded March 18, 1929, in Atlanta, Georgia)
6. Slim Doucet - "Dear Black Eyes (Chere Yeux Noirs)" (3:00) (recorded March 20, 1929, in Atlanta, Georgia)
7. Roosevelt Sykes - "Roosevelt Blues" (2:47) (recorded November 16, 1929, in Chicago, Illinois)
8. The Hokum Boys - "Gin Mill Blues" (3:27) (recorded November 16, 1929, in Chicago, Illinois)
9. Joe Falcon, accompanied by Clemo and Ophy Breaux - "Osson" (2:56) (recorded April 18, 1929, in Atlanta, Georgia)
10. W.T. Narmour & S.W. Smith - "Sweet Milk and Peaches (Breakdown)" (3:11) (recorded September 25, 1929, in New York City, New York)
11. Gid Tanner and the Skillet Lickers, with Riley Puckett & Clayton McMichen - "Soldier's Joy" (2:54) (recorded October 29, 1929, in Atlanta, Georgia)
12. Whistlin' Alex Moore - "They May Not Be My Toes" (3:02) (recorded December 5, 1929, in Dallas, Texas)
13. Mississippi Sheiks - "The Jazz Fiddler" (3:13) (recorded February 17, 1930, in Shreveport, Louisiana)
14. Lonnie Johnson - "I Have To Do My Time" (3:09) (recorded August 5, 1930, in New York City, New York)
15. Tom Darby and Jimmie Tarlton - "Lonesome Frisco Line" (3:17) (recorded October 31, 1929, in Atlanta, Georgia)
16. Roy Harvey and Leonard Copeland - "Back to the Blue Ridge" (2:55) (recorded June 30, 1930, in Atlanta, Georgia)
17. Buster Carter and Preston Young - "Darn Good Girl" (2:51) (recorded June 26, 1931, in New York City, New York)
18. Bo Carter - "West Jackson Blues" (3:17) (recorded June 10, 1930, in San Antonio, Texas)
19. Lonnie Johnson and Clara Smith (as Violet Green) - "You Had Too Much" (3:19) (recorded October 31, 1930, in New York City, New York)
20. Silver Leaf Quartet - "Oh! Glory Glory" (3:13) (recorded March 20, 1931, in New York City, New York)
21. Freeny's Barn Dance Band - "Don't You Remember the Time" (3:16) (recorded December 16, 1930, in Jackson, Mississippi)
22. Pelican Wildcats - "Walkin' Georgia Blues" (2:56) (recorded October 27, 1931, in Atlanta, Georgia)
23. Peetie Wheatstraw (The Devil's Son-in-Law) - "Police Station Blues" (3:03) (recorded March 15, 1932, in New York City, New York)
24. Tindley Quaker City Gospel Singers - "Hallelujah Side" (3:16) (recorded March 8, 1932, in New York City, New York)
25. Will Batts - "Highway #61 Blues" (2:42) (recorded August 3, 1933, in New York City, New York)

=== Disc three ===
1. W. Lee O'Daniel and His Light Crust Doughboys - "Doughboys Theme Song #1" (0:41) (recorded c. April 1934 in San Antonio, Texas)
2. W. Lee O'Daniel and His Hillbilly Boys - "Ida (Sweet as Apple Cider)" (3:09) (recorded November 21, 1936, in San Antonio, Texas)
3. W. Lee O'Daniel and His Light Crust Doughboys - "Doughboys Theme Song #2" (0:29) (recorded c. April 1934 in San Antonio, Texas)
4. Blind Willie McTell & Partner - "Bell Street Lightnin'" (2:52) (recorded September 21, 1933, in New York City, New York)
5. Charlie Patton - "Jersey Bull Blues" (3:04) (recorded January 30, 1934, in New York City, New York)
6. Walter Roland - "Every Morning Blues" (2:44) (recorded August 2, 1934, in New York City, New York)
7. Blue Ridge Ramblers - "D Blues" (2:48) (recorded February 14, 1935, in New York City, New York)
8. Breaux Freres - "La valse des yeux bleu (Blue Eyes Waltz)" (3:11) (recorded October 9, 1934, in San Antonio, Texas)
9. Lucille Bogan (as Bessie Jackson) - "Skin Game Blues" (2:57) (recorded March 8, 1935, in New York City, New York)
10. Leroy Carr with Scrapper Blackwell - "Good Woman Blues" (2:57) (recorded December 14, 1934, in New York City, New York)
11. Josh White (as Pinewood Tom) - "Sissy Man" (2:49) (recorded March 18, 1935, in New York City, New York)
12. The Rhythm Wreckers - "Blue Yodel #2 (My Lovin' Gal Lucille)" (2:46) (recorded March 27, 1937, in Los Angeles, California)
13. The Anglin Twins (Jack and Jim) - "Just Inside The Pearly Gates" (2:25) (recorded November 5, 1937, in San Antonio, Texas)
14. Bumble Bee Slim (Amos Easton) - "Hard Rocks in My Bed" (2:40) (recorded February 6, 1936, in Chicago, Illinois)
15. The Two Charlies - "Tired Feelin' Blues" (3:03) (recorded April 10, 1936, in New York City, New York)
16. Eldon Baker with His Brown County Revellers - "One Eyed Sam" (2:51) (recorded June 5, 1938, in Chicago, Illinois)
17. A'nt Idy Harper with The Coon Creek Girls - "Poor Naomi Wise" (3:36) (recorded June 30, 1938, in Chicago, Illinois)
18. (Kid) Prince Moore - "South Bound Blues" (3:01) (recorded April 10, 1936, in New York City, New York)
19. Big Bill Broonzy - "C & A Blues" (2:58) (recorded June 20, 1935, in Chicago, Illinois)
20. George Curry - "My Last Five Dollars" (2:36) (recorded November 2, 1938, in Chicago, Illinois)
21. The Nite Owls - "Memphis Blues" (2:21) (recorded June 12, 1938, in Dallas, Texas)
22. The Alley Boys of Abbeville - "Pourquoi tu m'aime pas" (3:46) (recorded June 30, 1939, in Memphis, Tennessee)
23. Reverend Benny Campbell - "Have Mercy on Me" (2:32) (recorded November 8, 1938, in Columbia, South Carolina)
24. Albert Ammons - "Shout For Joy" (2:25) (recorded December 30, 1938, in New York City, New York)
25. Jack Kelly - "Flower Blues" (2:30) (recorded July 14, 1939, in Memphis, Tennessee)
26. Cliff Carlisle (as Bob Clifford) - "Onion Eating Mama" (2:54) (recorded August 29, 1934, in New York City, New York)
27. Callahan Bros. - "Brown's Ferry Blues #2" (3:06) (recorded April 11, 1935, in New York City, New York)
28. Little Buddy Doyle - "Slick Capers Blues" (2:35) (recorded July 1, 1939, in Memphis, Tennessee)
29. Bill "Jazz" Gillum (as Bill McKinley) - "Poor Boy Blues" (2:54) (recorded May 2, 1941, in Chicago, Illinois)

=== Disc four ===
1. Frank Edwards - "We Got To Get Together" (2:36) (recorded May 28, 1941, in Chicago, Illinois)
2. Sweet Violet Boys - "You Got To See Mama Ev'ry Night (Or You Can't See Mama At All)" (2:49) (recordcd February 15, 1940, in Chicago, Illinois)
3. The Humbard Family - "I'll Fly Away" (2:49) (recorded April 17, 1940, in Dallas, Texas)
4. Tony Hollins - "Cross Cut Saw Blues" (2:48) (recorded June 3, 1941, in Chicago, Illinois)
5. Peter Cleighton - "Black Snake Blues" (2:51) (recorded July 1, 1941, in Chicago, Illinois)
6. Black Cats and the Kitten - "Step It Up and Go" (2:48) (recorded October 21, 1940, in Chicago, Illinois)
7. Bob and Randall Atcher - "Papa's Going Crazy, Mama's Going Mad" (2:38) (recorded June 13, 1940, in Chicago, Illinois)
8. Adolf Hofner and His San Antonians - "Cotton-Eyed Joe" (2:29) (recorded February 28, 1941, in Dallas, Texas)
9. Poor Boy Burke - "Old Vets Blues" (2:53) (recorded November 21, 1941, in Chicago, Illinois)
10. Little Son Joe - "Black Rat Swing" (2:52) (recorded December 12, 1941, in Chicago, Illinois)
11. Big Maceo Merriweather - "Macy Special" (2:42) (recorded February 19, 1945, in Chicago, Illinois)
12. Light Crust Doughboys, with J.B. Brinkley - "It's Funny What Love Will Make You Do" (2:47) (recorded March 3, 1941, in Dallas, Texas)
13. Hank Penny and His Radio Cowboys - "Army Blues" (2:36) (recorded June 29, 1941, in Charlotte, North Carolina)
14. James (Beale Street) Clark - "Who But You" (2:38) (recorded October 24, 1945, in Chicago, Illinois)
15. Homer Harris - "Tomorrow May Be Too Late" (3:05) (recorded September 27, 1946, in Chicago, Illinois)
16. Muddy Waters (as McKinley Morganfield) - "Burying Ground Blues" (2:30) (recorded September 27, 1946, in Chicago, Illinois)
17. Bill Monroe and His Blue Grass Boys - "Goodbye Old Pal" (2:23) (recorded February 13, 1945, in Nashville, Tennessee)
18. Gene Autry - "Dixie Cannonball" (2:40) (recorded September 9, 1946, in Hollywood, California)
19. Bill Landford and The Landfordaires - "Run On For A Long Time" (2:34) (recorded December 15, 1949, in Memphis, Tennessee)
20. Big Joe Williams - "Baby, Please Don't Go" (2:57) (recorded July 22, 1947, in Chicago, Illinois)
21. Sister Myrtle Fields accompanied by Austin McCoy Trio - "I"m Toiling" (2:43) (recorded January 7, 1950, in Hollywood, California)
22. Willie (Boodle It) Right - "Two By Four Blues" (2:56) (recorded October 7, 1940, in Chicago, Illinois)
23. Bailes Bros. - "You Can't Go Halfway (And Get In)" (2:46) (recorded December 21, 1947, location not listed)
24. Molly O'Day and the Cumberland Mountain Folks - "Heaven's Radio" (2:49) (recorded June 20, 1950, in Nashville, Tennessee)
25. Rosetta Howard - "Plow Hand Blues" (2:46) (recorded December 20, 1947, in Chicago, Illinois)
26. Memphis Seven - "Grunt Meat Blues" (2:47) (recorded October 4, 1947, in Chicago, Illinois)
27. Deep South Boys - "Until I Found The Lord" (2:25) (recorded December 20, 1947, in Nashville, Tennessee)
28. Brother Porter and Brother Cook - "I Know My Jesus Won't Deny Me" (2:41) (recorded July 11, 1950, in New York City, New York)
