= Frank "Springback" James =

American songwriter

- Genres: Blues, boogie-woogie
- Occupations: Pianist, singer, songwriter
- Instruments: Piano, vocals
- Years active: 1932–1938
- Labels: Champion, Decca, Victor, Vocalion

Frank "Springback" James was an American blues and boogie-woogie pianist, singer, and songwriter. He recorded eighteen tracks released by four record labels between 1934 and 1938, as well as possibly providing accompaniment to several other blues musicians. Details of his life are sketchy, and some of his recording activity has been subject to historical guesswork, rather than hard evidence.

His playing style showed measures of both St. Louis and Chicago blues, and the influence of others, particularly Leroy Carr. His recordings gave him a musical connection with blues musicians including Jimmie Gordon, Walter Davis, Curtis Jones, Walter Roland, Jean Shepard, Little Brother Montgomery, and Bumble Bee Slim. James wrote strong, emotional lyrics, but in his earlier recordings seemed monotonous. His best efforts were reserved for the erotic, "Snake Hip Blues", and the perhaps autobiographically inspired twosome of " Poor Coal Loader" and "Will my Bad Luck Ever Change?"

== Career ==
One blues historian suggested there is some evidence that Frank James may have been born in Alabama, but learned his music in St. Louis, Missouri. The same source thought that his birth name could have been James Hairston, largely based upon the credits on record labels of his work. However, there are no definitive birth nor death details available from any reliable authority.

What is more clear is that James first recorded for Gennett Records in 1932, with the intention that his earliest work would be released on their budget subsidiary label, Champion Records. However these recordings were not released and all trace of their existence has now seemingly disappeared. In 1934, under the name of Frank James he had four sides released by Champion, and seemingly on Varsity Records, the latter of which was owned by Eli Oberstein. The sides were "Frank's Lonesome Blues", "Forsaken Blues", "Mistreated Blues", and "Snake Hip Blues". They were recorded in Richmond, Indiana, in August 1934, with only "Snake Hip Blues" offering some relief from the others dealing with feeling lonesome, forsaken, or mistreated. Potential sales were badly hit by the effects of Great Depression. "Snake Hip Blues" foresaw something of a transformation as the following year, James recorded six more cuts for Decca Records under the moniker of Frank "Springback" James. "Springback" was a nickname hinting at the owner's tireless sexual prowess. One of those six tracks was his raunchiest, "Springback Papa", a stamina-filled, mid-tempo, boogie-woogie outing. They were all waxed in Chicago, Illinois, in 1935. Another of that sextet was "Rusty Can Blues", recorded on May 15, 1935, in the key of C. Despite the seeming change in approach, one published source later noted, "While there is no really definitive information available, there appears to be no doubt aurally that [...] recordings by Springback James are in fact by Frank James. It should be noted, however, that all the composers credits on the Bluebird issues [...] are to one James Hairston. It is thus suggested either that this artist's full name was Springback James Hairston or that Frank James's real name was James Hairston. Whatever the true explanation, the two artists definitely sound the same."

In 1936, James recorded again, this time for Victor Records, who streamlined his name to Springback James. Whereas before he had recorded solo with just his piano playing as accompaniment to his singing, these later waxings used a fuller sound by adding a guitarist, Willie Bee James. James technique had improved with experience and the twosome laid down six sides in December 1936. One of those was "Poor Coal Passer", recorded on December 21 that year, in the key of G. A further two sides were recorded by Vocalion Records in June 1937, with Fred Williams playing drums. James subsequently recorded on November 2, 1938, when he played piano backing for the vocalist George Curry, and where James was augmented by guitarist Hobson "Hop" Johnson and an unknown upright bassist.

His recordings from between 1934 and 1938, including his work backing Curry, were issued on compact disc in 1994 by Document Records.

== Other recording work ==
It seems possible that James played piano backing for Lucille Bogan on a couple of tracks, possibly "Black Angel Blues" and "Tricks Ain't Walking No More".

He conceivably supplied piano or even guitar backing, to a Bumble Bee Slim track or two in c. 1937.

James probably played the piano for Bob Robinson and his Bob-Cats on four tracks.

He also probably played piano for Lil Johnson on four tracks ("Snake Man Blues", "Evil Man Blues", "Get 'Em from the Peanut Man (Hot Nuts)" and "Anybody Here Want To Buy My Cabbage?").

== Discography ==
=== Singles ===
Year	Title	Record label	Credited to
1934	"Frank's Lonesome Blues" / "Forsaken Blues"	Champion Records / Varsity Records	Frank James
1934	"Mistreated Blues" / "Snake Hip Blues"	Champion Records / Varsity Records	Frank James
1935	"Rusty Can Blues" / "Texas Heifer Papa"	Decca Records	Frank "Springback" James
1935	"Stingaree Mama Blues" / "Springback Papa"	Decca Records	Frank "Springback" James
1935	"Poor Coal Loader" / "Lonesome Love Blues"	Decca Records	Frank "Springback" James
1936	"See for Yourself" / "New Red Cross Blues"	Victor Records	Springback James
1936	"I'm on My Way" / "Unkindness Blues"	Victor Records	Springback James
1936	"Will my Bad Luck Ever Change?" / "Poor Coal Passer"	Victor Records	Springback James
1937	"Hard Drivin' Mama" / "Hellish Way"	Vocalion Records	Springback James
1938	"You're Forever on My Mind" / "Back in My Cell Again"	Vocalion Records (unreleased)	George Curry
1938	"My Last Five Dollars"	Vocalion Records (unreleased)	George Curry

=== Compilation albums ===
Year	Title	Record label
1988	Frank "Springback" James (1934–1937)	Document Records
1994	Frank "Springback" James & George Curry 1934–1938	Document Records
