= Get 'Em from the Peanut Man (Hot Nuts) =

Single by Lil Johnson
- B-side: "Anybody Want to Buy My Cabbage?"
- Released: August 1935
- Recorded: July 16, 1935
- Genre: Dirty blues, hokum
- Length: 3:01
- Label: Champion
- Songwriter: Lil Johnson

"Get 'Em from the Peanut Man (Hot Nuts)" is a dirty blues and hokum song, written and initially recorded by Lil Johnson. The 10-inch shellac disc 78 rpm single was released by Champion Records in August 1935.

== History ==
Both "Get 'Em from the Peanut Man (Hot Nuts)" and "Anybody Want to Buy My Cabbage?" (the single's B-side), were recorded by Johnson (vocals) and possibly Frank "Springback" James (piano accompaniment) on July 16, 1935. The tracks were waxed in Chicago, Illinois. Johnson was identified as the songwriter of "Get 'Em from the Peanut Man (Hot Nuts)", both on the record label and in public records.

A similar claim on the record label regarding authorship was made for "Anybody Want to Buy My Cabbage?"; however this was not the case. A song titled "Anybody Here Want to Try My Cabbage" had been recorded by Maggie Jones on December 10, 1924. This was released as a single on March 30, 1925. That song was correctly credited to the joint authorship of Andy Razaf, Edgar Dowell and Fats Waller. Maggie Jones recording used the backing accompaniment of Louis Armstrong and Fletcher Henderson. An instrumental version of "Anybody Here Want to Try My Cabbage" was issued by George McClennon's Jazz Devils in 1925. The lyrical and musical content of Jones's and Johnson's songs are very similar.

In November 2022, a copy of Johnson's original single was worth around $53 (£45).

== Re-recordings ==
Johnson re-recorded "Get 'Em from the Peanut Man (Hot Nuts)" on March 4, 1936, this time accompanied by Black Bob on piano. It was released on Okeh Records with "Press My Button (Ring My Bell)" on the B-side.

Johnson re-recorded the song again, which was issued with the amended title "Get 'Em from the Peanut Man (The New Hot Nuts)" on Vocalion Records (catalog reference 03241) in 1936, with "Sam the Hot Dog Man" on the B-side.

== Compilation recordings ==
- Lil Johnson Vols 1–3, Document Records (1995).

Numerous other compilation albums include either, or both, of the tracks. These include Press My Button (2015), Lil Johnson Vol.1 1929-1936 (1995), and Scuffling Woman Blues (2021).
