= Charles Avery (pianist) =

American blues and boogie-woogie pianist (1892–1974)

- Born: probably Charles Anderson Avery; February 2, 1892; Brighton, Alabama, U.S.
- Died: September 11, 1974 (aged 82) possibly Chicago, Illinois, U.S.
- Genres: Blues; boogie-woogie
- Occupation: Pianist
- Years active: 1920s–1930s

Charles Avery (February 2, 1892 – September 11, 1974) was an American blues and boogie-woogie pianist. Although he only recorded one commercially released track under his own name, he accompanied a number of high-profile blues musicians in the 1920s and 1930s. Little is known of his life outside the recording studio.

== Life and career ==
Details of Avery's early life are sparse, although it is known that he was born in Brighton, Alabama, United States. It seems that Avery spent most of his life in Chicago, Illinois, and drew a strong connection to the city and its music. This is exemplified in the only title he recorded in his own name, "Dearborn St. Breakdown" (1929), which was released by Paramount Records. It was played in a style typical of Chicago musicians of that time, plus it is known that Avery played alongside, and backed, a number of musicians with connections to Chicago. AllMusic noted that Avery had "a prodigious piano technique".

Avery was primarily active in the late 1920s and 1930s, when he was utilised regularly as a session musician by record labels, when piano accompaniment was required for musicians without that attribute. Pianist credits for Avery include work with Leroy Carr, Tampa Red, Lucille Bogan (1930), Victoria Spivey (1931), Lil Johnson (1929), Red Nelson (1935), and the more obscure singer, Freddie "Redd" Nicholson (1930) (who recorded eight sides, although only five were issued).

Avery's backing work was primarily issued by Brunswick Records and Decca Records between 1929 and 1935.

His work with Lucille Bogan, when she was using her pseudonym, Bessie Jackson, included Avery's boogie-woogie style accompaniment on the March 1930 recording of "Alley Boogie". This was one of the earliest instances of a song title using the term 'boogie', following on from Pinetop Smith's "Pinetop's Boogie Woogie" (1928). This was not Avery's only recording with Bogan, as he was also the pianist playing on her recording of "My Georgia Grind", which was also recorded in late March 1930.

Lil Johnson, when recording "House Rent Scuffle" (1929), complimented Avery when stating on the recording, "Somebody buy the piano player a drink... He's just too tight. I wish you'd play that at my house every Saturday night!".

Avery's own track, "Dearborn St. Breakdown", is included on the compilation album, The Boogie Woogie Masters (1996), among many others.

Charles Avery died in September 11, 1974, at the age of 82. He was interred in Lincoln Cemetery in Blue Island, Illinois.

He is not to be confused with another Charles Avery (May 28, 1873 – July 23, 1926), who was an American silent film actor, film director, and screenwriter.

== Solo discography ==
=== Singles ===
Year	Title	Record label
1929	"Dearborn St. Breakdown"	Paramount Records
