= The Wildparty Sheiks =

American band

The Wildparty Sheiks were an American acoustic blues music quartet. Based in New York City, they were active from 1998 until late 2002, specializing in a revival of the "jug band" and "hokum" genres of African-American string band music originally performed in the early twentieth century (specifically, the late 1920's through the mid-1930's). Each member of the Wildparty Sheiks assumed a 'Sheik' pseudonym/stage name; they typically performed adorned in costumes such as silk robes, tuxedo suits, and fezzes.

== Band lineup ==
The band's lineup was:

Real Name	Pseudonym	Instrument(s)
Jonathan Royce	Sheik Professor Honeycat Crozet	Mandolin, Tenor Guitar, Backing Vocals
Frank Gresham	Sheik Crazy Wild Surprise	Resophonic Guitar, Lead Vocals, Mouth Trumpet
Joe LeSage	Sheik Liquid Giuseppe LeSage	Bass, Backing Vocals, Miscellanea
Willis DeBarge	Sheik Uptown Willis DeBarge	Drums, Engineering

== Album ==
In 2002, the band released an eponymous CD on 7th Room Records (#001) with the following tracks, all covers, crediting the original performers and dates of recording:

=== Track list ===
1. "My Money Never Runs Out" - Banjo Joe (Gus Cannon) 1927
2. "Loan Me Your Heart" - Papa Charlie Jackson 1929
3. "You Shall" - Frank Stokes 1927
4. "Take Those Lips Away" - Doc Roberts and Asa Martin 1928
5. "What Is It That Tastes Like Gravy" - Tampa Red and Georgia Tom 1929
6. "Can't Be Bothered With No Sheik" - Rosa Henderson 1931
7. "Boot It Boy" - Tampa Red and Frankie "Half Pint" Jaxon 1929
8. "Lady Quit Her Husband Onexpectingly" - Tub Jug Washboard Band 1928
9. "Old Jim Canaan" - Robert Wilkins 1935
10. "Dallas Rag" - Coley Jones and the Dallas String Band 1927
11. "O Tierra Del Sol" - (a.k.a. "Canción Mixteca"). José López Alavez 1915
12. "Gonna Tip Out Tonight" - Simmie Dooley and Pink Anderson 1928
- Bliss Blood of The Moonlighters provided guest vocals on "Can't Be Bothered With No Sheik" and the disc contained a bonus track accessible only by computer, which was a cover of the explicit version of "Shave 'Em Dry" as recorded by Lucille Bogan in 1935.

== Band dissolution ==
Soon after performing their final "CD release party" gig at NYC's "The Fez" nightclub on October 4, 2002, the band effectively dissolved with the departure of lead singer Gresham for a work relocation to London, UK. Gresham returned to New York City in 2005; he presently performs as singer and guitarist with the jug band "The Salt Cracker Crazies". Mandolist Royce relocated to Ontario, Canada where he performs with a variety of bands. Bassist LeSage relocated to Milwaukee, WI where he performs as "Pupy Costello" and "Old Sam Teardrop". Willis DeBarge, still a resident of NYC, is reported to have disappeared into the world of radio engineering.
