= Ikey Robinson =

American singer

- Born: Isaac L. Robinson; July 28, 1904; Dublin, Virginia, United States
- Died: October 25, 1990 (aged 86)
- Occupation: Musician
- Instruments: Banjo; singing

Isaac L. "Banjo Ikey" Robinson (July 28, 1904 – October 25, 1990) was an American banjoist and vocalist.

Born in Dublin, Virginia, United States, Robinson moved to Chicago, Illinois, in 1926, playing and recording with Jelly Roll Morton, Clarence Williams, and Jabbo Smith during 1928 and 1929. In 1929, Robinson recorded in Chicago with Georgia Tom, billed as the Hokum Boys. Their track, written by Dorsey, "I Had to Give Up Gym" was an early dirty blues song, sometimes described as hokum.

His groups included Ikey Robinson and his Band (w/ Jabbo Smith), the Hokum Trio, The Pods of Pepper, Windy City Five, and Sloke & Ike.

== Film ==
- Louie Bluie (1986). Directed by Terry Zwigoff.
