= Blind Leroy Garnett =

- Born: Leroy Roscoe Garnett; August 6, 1897; Indianapolis, Indiana, United States
- Died: January 3, 1933 (aged 35) Chicago, Illinois, United States
- Genres: Boogie-woogie, ragtime
- Occupations: Pianist, songwriter
- Instrument: Piano
- Years active: 1929–1930
- Labels: Paramount Records

Leroy Roscoe Garnett, known professionally as Blind Leroy Garnett (August 6, 1897 – January 3, 1933) was an American boogie-woogie and ragtime pianist and songwriter. His two solo recorded compositions were "Louisiana Glide" and "Chain 'Em Down", although scant details of his life and career are known.

== Life and career ==
Garnett was born in Indianapolis, United States, to parents Charles and Mattie Garnett (née Georapy), who both hailed from Kentucky. By 1910, all of the family had relocated to Chicago, Illinois, where he remained until at least 1930. In 1918, Garnett was described as a "piano player, not employed", short, stout and "totally blind". His playing style incorporated both boogie-woogie and ragtime, often termed 'barrelhouse'. Certainly "Louisiana Glide" was described as a "good example of the barrelhouse style wherein melodic treble work is combined with a thunderous, driving boogie-type bass".

He recorded a total of eight tracks for Paramount Records in 1929 and 1930. These included two piano solos; "Louisiana Glide" and "Chain 'Em Down", and on the rest he provided piano backing to James "Boodle It" Wiggins (four) and Marie Griffin (two tracks). It is known that two of his Paramount Records sides were recorded with Wiggins in Richmond, Virginia, in October 1929.

Garnett and Wiggins, the latter both a vocalist and pianist of some note, worked jointly around East Chicago, and about which Wiggins sang on the song "Shave 'Em Dry". "Shave 'Em Dry" gained more notoriety when performed by Lucille Bogan in 1935.

Garnett died of an intracerebral hemorrhage in Cook County Hospital, Chicago, in January 1933, aged 35. He was interred in Burr Oak Cemetery, Alsip, Illinois. In 2017 the Killer Blues Headstone Project placed a headstone there for Leroy Garnett.
