= Dirty blues =

Blues music about taboo subjects

Dirty blues (also known as bawdy blues) is a form of blues music that deals with socially taboo and obscene subjects, often referring to sexual acts and drug use. Because of the sometimes graphic subject matter, such music was often banned from radio and available only on jukeboxes. The style was most popular in the years before World War II, although it experienced a revival in the early 1950s.

Many songs used innuendo, slang terms, or double entendres, such as Lil Johnson's "Press My Button (Ring My Bell)" ("Come on baby, let's have some fun / Just put your hot dog in my bun"). However, some were very explicit. The most extreme examples were rarely recorded at all, a notable exception being Lucille Bogan's obscene version of "Shave 'Em Dry" (1935), which Elijah Wald has noted as "by far the most explicit blues song preserved at a commercial pre-war recording session".

The noteworthy musicians who used the style included Bo Carter, Bull Moose Jackson, Harlem Hamfats, Wynonie Harris, and Hank Ballard and The Midnighters.

Compilation albums include The Copulatin' Blues (Stash Records: 1976, re-released Mojo Records: 1996), Them Dirty Blues (Jass Records: 1989) and You Got to Give Me Some of It: 55 Risque Blues and R&B Classics 1928–1954 (Jasmine Records: 2015).

== Notable songs ==
Year	Title	Artist	References
1924	"See See Rider"	Ma Rainey	
1927	"Bow Wow Blues"	The Allen Brothers	
1928	"It's Tight Like That"	Tampa Red and Georgia Tom	
1928	"The Duck's Yas-Yas-Yas"	James "Stump" Johnson	
1928	"Empty Bed Blues"	Bessie Smith	
1929	"I Had to Give Up Gym"	The Hokum Boys	
1929	"Rock That Thing"	Lil Johnson	
1929	"You'll Never Miss Your Jelly Until Your Jelly Roller Is Gone"	Lil Johnson	
1929	"Bumblebee"	Memphis Minnie	
1930	"Please Warm My Weiner"	Bo Carter	
1930	"Good Grinding"	Irene Scruggs	
1930	"Must Get Mine in Front"	Irene Scruggs	
1930	"On the Wall"	Louise Johnson	
1931	"Pin in Your Cushion"	Bo Carter	
1931	"Banana in Your Fruit Basket"	Bo Carter	
1931	"My Pencil Won't Write No More"	Bo Carter	
1931	"Need a Little Sugar in My Bowl"	Bessie Smith	
1931	"You've Got to Save That Thing"	Ora Alexander	
1931	1932	"I Crave Your Lovin' Every Day"	Ora Alexander
1933	"Tom Cat and Pussy Blues"	Jimmie Davis	
1933	"Steady Grinding"	James "Stump" Johnson and Dorothea Trowbridge	
1935	"Shave 'Em Dry"	Lucille Bogan	
1935	"Let Me Roll Your Lemon"	Bo Carter	
1935	"Get 'Em from the Peanut Man (Hot Nuts)"	Lil Johnson	
1935	"Anybody Want to Buy My Cabbage?"	Lil Johnson	
1935	"Press My Button (Ring My Bell)"	Lil Johnson	
1936	"Trucking My Blues Away"	Blind Boy Fuller	
1936	"Sam the Hot Dog Man"	Lil Johnson	
1936	"My Stove Is In Good Condition"	Lil Johnson	
1937	"They're Red Hot"	Robert Johnson	
1937	"Meat Balls"	Lil Johnson	
1937	"If It Don't Fit (Don't Force It)"	Lil Johnson	
1938	"Don't You Feel My Leg?"	Blue Lu Barker	
1939	"I Want Some of Your Pie"	Blind Boy Fuller	
1941	"Crosscut Saw"	Tommy McClennan	
1942	"Let Me Play With Your Poodle"	Tampa Red	
1944	"Salty Papa Blues"	Dinah Washington	
1946	"Gotta Gimme Whatcha Got"	Julia Lee	
1947	"(Opportunity Knocks But Once) Snatch and Grab It"	Julia Lee	
1947	"Mother Fuyer"	Dirty Red	
1948	"Lolly Pop Mama"	Wynonie Harris	
1948	"King Size Papa"	Julia Lee	
1948	"I Want A Bowlegged Woman"	Bull Moose Jackson	
1949	"Long John Blues"	Dinah Washington	
1949	"Mountain Oysters"	Eddie "Lockjaw" Davis	
1950	"Butcher Pete"	Roy Brown	
1950	"My Man Stands Out"	Julia Lee	
1950	"I Like My Baby's Pudding"	Wynonie Harris	
1950	"Sittin' on It All the Time"	Wynonie Harris	
1950	"I'm a Hi-Ballin' Daddy"	Tiny Bradshaw	
1950	"Silent George"	Lucky Millinder	
1951	"Rocket 69"	Todd Rhodes	
1951	"Sixty Minute Man"	Billy Ward and His Dominoes	
1951	"Lemon Squeezing Daddy"	The Sultans	
1951	"The Walkin' Blues (Walk Right In, Walk Right Out)"	Fluffy Hunter	
1951	"It Ain't the Meat (It's the Motion)"	The Swallows	
1952	"Keep On Churnin' (Till the Butter Comes)"	Wynonie Harris	
1952	"Big Ten Inch Record"	Bull Moose Jackson	
1952	"Nosey Joe"	Bull Moose Jackson	
1952	"Little Girl Sing Ding-A-Ling"	Dave Bartholomew	
1952	"Drill Daddy Drill"	Dorothy Ellis	
1953	"Wasn't That Good"	Wynonie Harris	
1953	"Laundromat Blues"	The "5" Royales	
1954	"Work with Me, Annie"	The Midnighters	
1954	"Shake, Rattle and Roll"	Big Joe Turner	
1954	"Big Long Slidin' Thing"	Dinah Washington	
1954	"Baby Let Me Bang Your Box"	The Toppers	
1954	"Mr Thrill"	Mildred Jones	
1954	"Rotten Cocksuckers' Ball"	The Clovers	
1954	"Toy Bell"	The Bees	
1954	"Sexy Ways"	Hank Ballard	
1956	"Salty Dog"	Blind Willie McTell	

- NB. According to AllMusic, this list of dirty blues songs also included "What the Blues Is All About" by Chick Willis, "Cigarette" by Backwards Sam Firk, and "Georgia Grind" (1926). The latter's music was written by Spencer Williams and recorded by Blue Lu Barker and Louis Armstrong among others.

== See also ==
- Dirty rap
- Hokum
