= McClennon =

McClennon is a surname. Notable people with the surname include:

- George McClennon (died 1937), American jazz clarinetist, singer, and dancer
- James McClennon (1900–1971), English footballer
- Sheila McClennon (born 1960), British radio presenter

== See also ==
- McClendon
- McGlennon
- Clennon
