= Edward Anthony =

Edward Anthony may refer to:

- Edward Anthony (photographer) (1819–1888), American photographer and one of the founders of E. & H. T. Anthony & Company
- Edward Anthony (writer) (1895–1971) American writer and journalist

== See also ==
- Eddie Anthony (1890–1934), jazz musician
