= Louisa Johnson (disambiguation) =

Louisa Johnson (born 1998), is a singer who won The X Factor in 2015.

Louisa Johnson is also the name of:

- Louisa Adams (née Johnson; 1775–1852), First Lady of the United States from 1825 to 1829

== See also ==
- Louise Johnson (1940–2012), British biochemist and protein crystallographer
- Louise Johnson (blues) - Blues singer and pianist.
