= James "Boodle It" Wiggins =

American blues singer and musician

- Also known as: James Wiggins, "Boodle It" Wiggins
- Born: probably Louisiana, United States
- Genres: Blues
- Occupations: Singer, musician
- Instruments: Vocals, kazoo, harmonica
- Years active: Late 1920s
- Labels: Paramount Records

James "Boodle It" Wiggins was an American blues singer and musician. His best known recordings were "Keep Knockin' An You Can't Get In", a precursor of both "Keep A-Knockin'" and "I Hear You Knocking"; plus his versions of "Corrine, Corrina" and "Shave 'Em Dry", albeit slightly re-titled.

Wiggins recorded eight tracks that were released in his lifetime by Paramount Records, and another six that were not issued until later. The latter six were originally earmarked for Vocalion Records or Brunswick Records. His accompanists on his recorded work are thought to include variously Bob Call, Blind Leroy Garnett, and Charlie Spand on piano. Little is known of his life outside of music.

== Life and career ==
It is generally thought that Wiggins was born in Louisiana, United States, and is credited as such in several sources. His acquired nickname of "Boodle It" appears to come from his association with a style of dance, although there was also an assumed sexual connotation.

Wiggins is believed to have been discovered in Dallas, by R. L. Ashford, a scout for Paramount Records. However, Big Bill Broonzy told Paul Oliver that Wiggins originally came from Louisiana. Wiggins subsequently recorded eight sides, in three separate sessions, for Paramount between 1928 and 1929. His first recording session produced "Keep Knockin' An You Can't Get In", which was recorded in Chicago, Illinois, around February 1928 and released by Paramount (12662) that year. Wiggins sang and played the kazoo on the track. The pianist on the track is believed to be Bob Call, who some time later played accompaniment to Big Bill Broonzy, Jazz Gillum, Robert Nighthawk, and Arbee Stidham. In his autobiography. Born With The Blues, Perry Bradford claimed to be composer of the song, but the first recorded version would seem to be that by Wiggins. Variations were then recorded by Lil Johnson in 1935 and Louis Jordan in 1939. According to Rolling Stone, Jordan had heard the James Wiggins and Kokomo Arnold versions. "Keep Knockin' An You Can't Get In" was a precursor of both "Keep A-Knockin'" and "I Hear You Knocking". The other track recorded at the same session was "Evil Woman Blues".

There were two further recording sessions undertaken by Wiggins in Chicago on November 13 and 14, 1928. This resulted in six unissued sides. These were originally earmarked for Vocalion Records or Brunswick Records.

On October 12, 1929, in Richmond, Indiana, Wiggins recorded another four sides, "Forty-Four Blues", "Frisco Bound", "My Lovin' Blues" and "Weary Heart Blues" for Paramount, plus another two in Grafton, Wisconsin that the same month. Paramount placed two advertisements in The Chicago Defender; the first on November 30, 1928 (promoting "Keep A Knockin' An You Can't Get In" b/w "Evil Woman Blues") and then on January 25, 1930 (for "Weary Heart Blues" b/w "My Lovin' Blues"). Blind Leroy Garnett played piano accompaniment on the four tracks recorded in Richmond. Whereas in Grafton, Wiggins recorded his version of "Gotta Shave 'Em Dry", and "Corrine Corrina Blues" with a boogie-woogie accompaniment by the pianist, Charlie Spand. These were also issued by Paramount (12916).

More recently, Blues Unlimited, in an article headed "A Handful of Keys: Boodle It One Time?", reported that Bob Hall and Richard Noblett had analyzed Wiggins' recordings, and cast doubts on the accepted identifications of the pianists. They accepted Garnett's presence on "My Lovin' Blues" and "Weary Heart Blues", but cast some doubt as to whether he played on "Forty-Four Blues". Similarly they agreed on Bob Call as the pianist on "Evil Woman Woman Blues", but not necessarily "Keep Knockin' An You Can't Get In". For Wiggins's final recording "Corinne Corinna" and "Gotta Shave 'Em Dry", Charlie Spand had been suggested but no firm conclusions were drawn. Bob Call, was identified on the two unissued Wiggins sessions.

Wiggins survived a lynching in Bogalusa, Louisiana, in 1929, when a white woman took offence at his refusal to step aside for her on a public street. A local mob shot him four times and lynched him, although he survived the ordeal.

It is supposed that Wiggins died in c. 1930, although details are unknown.

Several of his tracks have appeared on various compilation albums, including Boogie Woogie & Barrelhouse Piano Vol. 2 (1928-1930) (Document Records, 1992).

== Lyrical similarities ==
Wiggins, in common with some other blues musicians, tended to recycle some of his song lyrics, with the lines "I wake up every morning..." and "I woke up this morning...", identified in three of his songs - "Evil Woman Blues" and "Forty-Four Blues", and the latter deviation in "Frisco Bound".

== Discography ==
Year	A-side	B-side	Record label
1928	"Evil Woman Blues"	"Keep Knockin' An You Can't Get In"	Paramount Records
1929	"Forty-Four Blues"	"Frisco Bound"	Paramount Records
1929	"My Lovin' Blues"	"Weary Heart Blues"	Paramount Records
1929	"Corrine Corrina Blues"	"Gotta Shave 'Em Dry"	Paramount Records

== See also ==
- List of blues musicians
