= Let Me Play with Your Poodle (song) =

"Let Me Play with Your Poodle" is a 1942 hokum blues song written by the American blues musician Tampa Red. His recording reached number 4 on the Billboard "Harlem Hit Parade" in March 1943, after first hitting the chart in December 1942, and the song has been recorded many times since by other artists.

== Other notable recordings ==
- Bonnie Davis and the Piccadilly Pipers (1946)
- Hank Penny (1947)
- Lightnin' Hopkins (1947) and again in 1969, on his album The Great Electric Show and Dance, which was released in 1970.
- Luke "Long Gone" Miles (with George "Harmonica" Smith) (1962)
- Piano Red (1977, on an album of the same name)
- CeDell Davis (1982, on the compilation album Living Country Blues USA Vol. 5 - Mississippi Delta Blues)
- Dana Gillespie (1982, on the album Blue Job)
- James Cotton (1996, on the Grammy-winning album Deep in the Blues)
