= Clennon =

Clennon is a male given and surname. Notable people with the name include:

== Surname ==
- Andre Clennon (born 1989), Jamaican professional footballer
- David Clennon (born 1943), American actor
- Mark Clennon (born 1990), Jamaican Canadian singer, musician, writer, producer, and actor

== Given name ==
- Clennon Washington King Jr. (1920–2000), the second African-American man to run for the office of President of the United States
- Clennon Washington King Sr. (1891–1975), political activist, Tuskegee Institute student and chauffeur of Booker T. Washington

== See also ==
- McClennon
