= Hokum =

Type of song in American blues

Hokum is a particular song type of American blues music—a song which uses extended analogies or euphemistic terms to make humorous, sexual innuendos. This trope goes back to early dirty blues recordings, enjoyed huge commercial success in the 1920s and 1930s, and is used from time to time in modern American blues and blues rock.

An example of hokum lyrics is this sample from "Meat Balls", by Lil Johnson, recorded in 1937:

Got out late last night, in the rain and sleet
Tryin' to find a butcher that grind my meat
Yes I'm lookin' for a butcher
He must be long and tall
If he want to grind my meat
'Cause I'm wild about my meat balls.

== Terminology ==
"Hokum", originally a vaudeville term used for a simple performance bordering on vulgarity, "old and sure-fire comedy", but hinting at a smart wordplay, was first used to describe the genre of black music in a billing of a race record for Tampa Red's Hokum Jug Band (Tampa Red and Georgia Tom, 1929). After producing a big hit, "It's Tight Like That", with Vocalion Records (and its sequel) in 1928, the musicians went on to Paramount Records where they were called The Hokum Boys. Other recording studios joined the fray using similarly named ensembles. The application of "hokum" to describe the musical approach of these bands was fostered by Papa Charlie Jackson with his "Shake That Thing" (1925).

The meaning of the stage slang word "hokum" was a subject of an extensive debate in the 1920s ("most discussed word in the entire vernacular", right next to the "jazz"). The term "hokum blues" did not become a formal designation of a style until 1960s. "Hokum" is also used to describe the low comedy acts that were used at the turn of the 20th century to lure audiences to musical performances. In the words of W. C. Handy, a veteran of a minstrel troupe, "Our hokum hooked 'em" outside the opera house, so that "ticket sellers would go to work". King applies the term to the early short slapstick films.

=== Etymology ===
The sources do not agree on the origins of "hokum": the word is thought to exist since either the late 19th, or early 20th century. It can be derived either by analogy with gap-sealing material oakum (the reliable gags of hokum were supposed to fill the deficiencies of the stage act), or a blend of "hocus-pocus" and "bunkum" (nonsense).

=== Similar genres ===
Some of the hokum songs are also classified as belonging to the "dirty blues" subgenre of blues. Some sources treat hokum and dirty (also "bawdy") blues as interchangeable terms. However, music researchers point to differences: dirty blues were played before the appearance of hokum, the innuendo in the dirty blues is earnest and mature, while the hokum was full of sass and humor. The dirty blues are good for dancing the slow drag, while hokum, with its bouncy, ragtime-influenced songs is intended for more lively dance style typical for the "mischievous branch" of music (similar to lundu, maxixe, xote, or samba).

Daniel Beaumont points to minstrel shows, vaudeville, and medicine shows as the origins of humor in blues. These genres influenced the classic and country blues, which in turn fed hokum in the 1930s. Hokum after its heyday influenced rhythm and blues in 1940s and Chicago blues in 1950s and 1960s.

== Hokum and early blues ==
Hokum subgenre evolved from early blues, when in the late 1920s a new generation of bluesmen created a "more urbane product" that in addition to hokum included topical ballads, vaudeville blues, country blues, proto-jive. Some commentators have argued that hokum "city style" was a degradation of the folk blues.

Blues and hokum were inseparable until the very end of hokum era in the mid-1930s. Hokum is considered to be an immediate predecessor of urban blues (Muddy Waters, Howlin’ Wolf, Elmore James).

== Hokum in early country music ==
While hokum surfaces in early blues music most frequently, there was some significant crossover culturally. When the Chattanooga-based "brother duet" the Allen Brothers recorded a hit version of "Salty Dog Blues", refashioned as "Bow Wow Blues" in 1927 for Columbia's 15,000-numbered "Old Time" series the label rushed out several new releases to capitalize on their success, but mistakenly issued them on the 14,000 series instead.

In fact, the Allen Brothers were so adept at performing white blues that in 1927, Columbia mistakenly released their "Laughin' and Cryin' Blues" in the "race" series instead of the "old-time" series. (Not seeing the humor in it, the Allens sued and promptly moved to the Victor label.)

An early black string band, the Dallas String Band with Coley Jones, recorded the song "Hokum Blues" on December 8, 1928, in Dallas, Texas, featuring mandolin instrumentation. They have been identified both as proto bluesmen and as an early Texas country band and were likely to have been selling to both black and white audiences. Blind Lemon Jefferson and T-Bone Walker played in the Dallas String Band at various times. Milton Brown and his Musical Brownies, the seminal white Texas swing band, recorded a hokum tune with scat lyrics in the early 1930s, "Garbage Man Blues", which was originally known by the title the jazz composer Luis Russell gave it, "The Call of the Freaks". Bob Wills, who had performed in blackface as a young man, liberally used comic asides, whoops, and jive talk when directing his famous Texas Playboys. The Hoosier Hot Shots, Bob Skyles and the Skyrockets, and other novelty song artists concentrated on the comedic aspects, but for many up-and-coming white country musicians, like Emmett Miller, Clayton McMichen and Jimmie Rodgers, the ribald lyrics were beside the point. Hokum for these white rounders in the South and Southwest was synonymous with jazz, and the "hot" syncopations and blue notes were a naughty pleasure in themselves. The lap steel guitar player Cliff Carlisle, who was half of another "brother duet", is credited with refining the blue yodel song style after Jimmie Rodgers became the first country music superstar by recording over a dozen blue yodels. Carlisle wrote and recorded many hokum tunes and gave them titles such as "Tom Cat Blues", "Shanghai Rooster Yodel" and "That Nasty Swing". He marketed himself as a "hillbilly", a "cowboy", a "Hawaiian" or a "straight" bluesman (meaning presumably, black), depending on the audience for whom he was playing and where he played.

The radio "barn dances" of the 1920s and 1930s interspersed hokum in their variety show broadcasts. The first blackface comedians at the WSM Grand Ole Opry were Lee Roy "Lasses" White and his partner, Lee Davis "Honey" Wilds, starring in the Friday night shows. White was a veteran of several minstrel troupes, including one organized by William George "Honeyboy" Evans and another led by Al G. Field, who also employed Emmett Miller. By 1920, White was leading his own outfit, the All Star Minstrels. Lasses and Honey joined the Grand Ole Opry cast in 1932. When Lasses moved on to Hollywood in 1936 to play the role of a silver-screen cowboy sidekick, Wilds stayed on in Nashville, corking up and playing blues on his ukulele with his new partner Jam-Up (first played by Tom Woods and subsequently by Bunny Biggs). Wilds organized the first Grand Ole Opry–endorsed tent show in 1940. For the next decade, he ran the touring show, with Jam-Up and Honey as the headliners. Pulling a forty-foot trailer behind a four-door Pontiac and followed by eight to ten trucks, Wilds took the tent show from town to town, hurrying back to Nashville on Saturdays for his Opry radio appearances. Many country musicians, like Uncle Dave Macon, Bill Monroe, Eddy Arnold, Stringbean and Roy Acuff, toured with the Wilds tent shows from April through Labor Day. As Wilds's son David said in an interview,

Music was a part of their act, but they were comedians. They would sing comedic songs, a la Homer and Jethro. They would add odd lyrics to existing songs, or write songs that were intended to be comedic. They were out there to come onstage, do five minutes of jokes, sing a song, do five minutes of jokes, sing another song and say, "Thank you, good night", as their segment of the Grand Ole Opry. Almost every country band during that time had some guy who dressed funny, wore a goofy hat, and typically played slide guitar.

== Legacy ==
By the mid-1930s the hokum bands were fading out. Georgia Tom became religious and switched to black gospel music by 1932, leaving Tampa Red to perform solo blues and hokum, Big Bill Broonzy from 1930 occasionally joined the Hokum Boys and the Famous Hokum Boys for their recordings with the last one in 1936. Leroy Carr made few hokum recordings with very mild lyrics, but moved to blues again with his rendition of "Sloppy Drunk Blues", originally by Lucille Bogan, becoming a blues standard.

Some hokum songs were absorbed into mainline jazz:

- "It's Tight Like That" was recorded by Jimmie Noone, McKinney's Cotton Pickers, Jimmy Bracken's Toe Ticklers (with Jack Teagarden and Benny Goodman);
- Louis Armstrong recorded "Tight Like This" in December 1928 that sounds like a response to the hokum song with his famous trumpet solo improvisation;
- Duke Ellington joined the chorus with his "Who said 'It's Tight Like That'?" in March 1929.

Country music also use the hokum material:

- Luis Russell, one of the main figures behind the New Orleans jazz transition to swing, recorded "It's Tight Like That" in January 1929, with "The Call of The Freaks" on the other of the single. In the hands of Milton Brown the latter one turned into the "Garbage Man Blues";
- In 1936 Brown also recorded a version of "Keep A Knockin'", in May 1938 Bob Willis recorded "Keep Knocking (But You Can't Come In)".

The popularity of hokum rubbed off onto jive talk, with the latter eventually lasting longer than hokum and reaching wider audiences.

== Critique ==
Some scholars resent hokum as an era of purely commercial blues, when producers pushed the musicians to rehash the same slick songs, resembling the times of Tin Pan Alley.

== Examples of hokum ==
Schwartz lists the following examples of hokum in the discography section:

Discography of records related to It's Tight Like That
Title	Artist	Label/catalog #	Year
It's Tight Like That	Tampa Red's Hokum Jug Band	Vocalion 1228	1928
It's Tight Like That No. 2	Georgia Tom and Tampa Red	Vocalion 1244	1929
It's Tight Like That No. 3	Georgia Tom and Tampa Red	Vocalion 1418	1929
(Honey) It's Tight Like That	Harry Jones and Papa Too Sweet	OKeh 6581	1929
It's Tight Like That	Tampa Red	Vocalion 1258	1929
It's Tight Like That	McKinney's Cotton Pickers	Victor V38013-A	1928
It's Tight Like That	Walter Barnes and his Royal Creolians	Brunswick 4244	1928
It's Tight Like That	Jimmie Noone's Apex Club Orchestra, with Junie Cobb	Vocalion 1238	1928
It's Tight Like That	Clara Smith	Columbia 14398D	1929
It's Tight Like That	Luis Russell and his Burning Eight	OKeh 8656 Paramount R2186, Parlophone R1286	1929
It's Tight Like That	Zach Whyte's Chocolate Beau Brummels	Champion 15715, Supertone 9368	1929
It's Tight Like That	Hilda Alexander and Mamie McClure	Brunswick 7069	1929
It's Tight Like That	Southern Blues Singers, accompanied by Cow Cow Davenport	Gennett 6826	1929
It's Tight Like That	Eddie Mapp, James Moore and Slim Barton	QRS R7081	1929
It's Tight Like That	Otis Mote	OKeh 45389	1929
(It's) Tight Like This	Louis Armstrong and his Savoy Five	OKeh 8649	1928
Who Said It's Tight Like That	The Washingtonians (Duke Ellington and his Orchestra)	Cameo 9195	1929
Shake That Thing	Papa Charlie Jackson	Paramount 12281	1925
Shake That Thing	Clarence Williams's Blue Five	OKeh 8267	1925
Shake That Thing	Ethel Waters	Columbia 14116D	1925
Shake That Thing	Billy Wirges and his Orchestra	Perfect 14533, Pathé 36352	1925
Shake That Thing	Viola McCoy	Vocalion 15245	1926
Shake That Thing	Viola Bartlette	Paramount 12345	1926
Shake That Thing	Jimmy O’Bryant's Famous Washboard Band	Paramount 12346A	1926
Shake That Thing	Abe Lyman and his Californians	Brunswick 3069	1926
Georgia Grind	Louis Armstrong and his Hot Five	OKeh 8318	1926
Matchbox Blues	Blind Lemon Jefferson	Paramount 12474	1927
Black Bottom Stomp	Jelly Roll Morton and his Red Hot Peppers	Victor 20221	1926
Down to the Bricks	Jimmy O’Bryant's Famous Original Washboard Band	Paramount 12308	1925
You've Got The Right Key, but the Wrong Keyhole	Virginia Liston with Clarence Williams’ Blue Five	OKeh 8173	1924
Hyena Stomp	Jelly Roll Morton and his Red Hot Peppers	Victor 20772A	1927
Beedle-Um-Bum	The Hokum Boys	Paramount 12714	1929
Selling That Stuff	The Hokum Boys	Paramount 12714	1929
Hey Mama, It's Nice Like That, Parts 1–2	Jim Jackson	Vocalion 1284	1929
It's a Fight Like That	Blind Ben Covington	Brunswick 7127	1929
She Moves It Just Right	Barbecue Bob	Columbia 14546D	1929
Thirty-Eight and Plus	John Byrd and Washboard Walter	Gennett 7157 Champion 15972, Supertone 9682, Varsity 6044	1930
It Feels So Good, Parts 1–2	Lonnie Johnson and Spencer Williams	OKeh 8664, Harmony 1087	1929
It Feels So Good, Parts 3–4	Lonnie Johnson and Spencer Williams	OKeh 8697 Vocalion 03094	1929
I Don't Like That	Barefoot Bill and Pillie Bolling	Columbia 14554-D	1930
Loose Like That	Alura Mack	Gennett 6876, Supertone 9440 Champion 15754	1929
It's Hot Like That	Charlie McCoy	Brunswick 7156	1930
Wringing That Thing	Macon Ed and Tampa Joe	OKeh 8676	1929
That Will Be Alright	Memphis Minnie and Kansas Joe	Columbia 14439D	1929
Bottle It Up and Go	Picaninny Jug Band	Champion 16615	1932
Diddie-Wa-Diddie	Blind Blake	Paramount 12888	1929
Diddle-Da-Diddle	Georgia Cotton Pickers	Columbia 14577-D	1930
Giving It Away	Birmingham Jug Band	OKeh 8908	1930
Wipe It Off	Lonnie Johnson and Clarence Williams	OKeh 8762	1930
She Skuffles That Ruff	Lovin’ Sam Theard	Brunswick 7075	1929
Struttin’ My Stuff	Lucille Bogan	Brunswick 7193	1930
She's Got Good Stuff	Charlie Spand	Paramount 13005	1930
Move That Thing	Georgia Peanut Boys	Victor 23274	1930
Tapping That Thing	Burse and Stephen	Champion 16654	1932
We Can Sell That Thing	Roosevelt Sykes	Paramount 13004	1930
Smack That Thing	Walter Coleman	Decca 7157	1936
Somebody's Been Using That Thing	Famous Hokum Boys	Banner 712, Oriole 8010 Perfect 150, Romeo 5010, Jewel 20010, Homestead 16099	1930
Dallas Rag	Dallas String Band	Columbia 14290-D	1927
Hokum Blues	Dallas String Band	Columbia 14389-D	1928
Bohunkus Blues	Blythe's Washboard Band	Paramount 12368	1926
The King of the Zulus	Louis Armstrong and his Hot Five	OKeh 8396A OKeh 41581	1926
That Stuff I Got	Famous Hokum Boys	Oriole 8059, Banner 32139 Perfect 174, Romeo 5059	1930
I Had to Give Up Gym	Hokum Boys	Paramount 12746	1929
We Don't Sell It Here No More	Hokum Boys	Brunswick 7070	1929
Let Me Have It	Hokum Boys	Paramount 12897	1929
Can I Get Some of That?	Coot Grant and Sox Wilson	QRS R7065 Paramount 12833	1929
She Shakes a Mean Ashcan	Coot Grant and Sox Wilson	Columbia 14598-D	1931
Big Trunk Blues	Coot Grant and Sox Wilson	QRS R7085 Paramount 12831	1929
I Ain’t Gonna Give You None	Coot Grant and Sox Wilson	QRS R7085 Paramount 12831	1929
What Is It That Tastes Like Gravy?	Tampa Red	Vocalion 1426, Supertone S2225	1929
Get ’Em from the Peanut Man (Hot Nuts)	Lil Johnson	Champion 50002	1935
Banana in Your Fruit Basket	Bo Carter	Columbia 14661-D Vocalion 03091, Bluebird B5594	1931
Sweet Honey Hole	Blind Boy Fuller	ARC 7-04-73 Vocalion 03254, Conqueror 8847	1937
Please Warm My Wiener	Bo Carter	Bluebird B6058	1935
Riverside Blues	King Oliver’s Jazz Band	OKeh 8484	1923
I Just Want a Daddy to Call My Own	Faye Barnes	Paramount 12136	1921
I Just Want a Daddy to Call My Own	Monette Moore	Paramount 12028	1923
I Just Want a Daddy to Call My Own	Alice Carter	OKeh S-71595	1923
Muddy Water Blues	Monette Moore	Paramount 12067	1923
Eagle Rock Me, Papa	Sara Martin with Clarence Williams’ Blue Five	OKeh S-72858	1924
Don't Shake It No More	Trixie Smith	Paramount 12211	1924
Don't Shake It No More	Lovie Austin's Blues Serenaders	Paramount 12300	1925
Freight Train Blues	Trixie Smith	Paramount 12211	1924
That Creole Band	Albert Wynn and his Gut Bucket Five	OKeh 9789	1926
Easy Rider Blues	Blind Lemon Jefferson	Paramount 12474	1927
Explaining the Blues	Ma Rainey and her Georgia Band	Paramount 12284	1925
Stormy Sea Blues	Ma Rainey and her Georgia Band	Paramount 12295	1925
Nighttime Blues	Ma Rainey and her Georgia Band	Paramount 12303	1925
Memphis Bound Blues	Ma Rainey and her Georgia Band	Paramount 12311	1925
Slave to the Blues	Ma Rainey and her Georgia Band	Paramount 12332	1925
Chain Gang Blues	Ma Rainey and her Georgia Band	Paramount 12388	1925
Bessemer Bound Blues	Ma Rainey and her Georgia Band	Paramount 12374	1925
Through Train Blues	Tampa Red	Paramount 12685	1928
Salty Dog Blues	Papa Charlie Jackson	Paramount 12236, Broadway 5001	1924
Salty Dog Blues	Freddie Keppard's Jazz Cardinals	Paramount 12399	1926
Chicago Flip	Whistler's Jug Band	Gennett 5544	1924
The Jug Band Special	Whistler's Jug Band	OKeh 8816	1927
I'm Looking for the Bully of the Town	Memphis Jug Band	Victor 20781	1927
Sugar Pudding	Memphis Jug Band	Victor 21740	1928
On the Road Again	Memphis Jug Band	Victor V38015	1928
She's in the Graveyard Now	Earl McDonald's Original Louisville Jug Band	Columbia 14255-D	1924
Minglewood Blues	Cannon's Jug Stompers	Victor 21267	1918
Jazz Gypsy Blues	Banjo Joe [Gus Cannon]	Paramount 12064	1928
My Money Never Runs Out	Banjo Joe [Gus Cannon]	Paramount 12064	1928
Boodle-Am-Shake	Dixieland Jug Blowers	Victor 20480	1926
House Rent Rag	Dixieland Jug Blowers	Victor 20415	1926
Skoodlum Blues	Jimmy O’Bryant's Famous Original Washboard Band	Paramount 12260	1925
Georgia Breakdown	Jimmy O’Bryant's Famous Original Washboard Band	Paramount 12277	1925
Uncle Bud	Tampa Red and Georgia Tom	Vocalion 1268, Supertone S2224	1929
How Long, How Long	Leroy Carr	Vocalion 1191	1928
It Ain’t No Good, Parts 1–2	Charlie McCoy with Chatman's Mississippi Hot Footers	Brunswick 7118, Melotone 12303	1929
Bottle It Up and Go	Tommy McClennan	Bluebird B8378, Montgomery Ward M8787	1939
Step It Up and Go	Blind Boy Fuller	Vocalion 05476, Conqueror 9274 Columbia 30011 Columbia 37230	1940
Home Town Skiffle, Parts 1–2	Paramount All-Stars	Paramount 12886	1929
Georgia Grind	Ethel Waters	Columbia 14116-D	1925

== Hokum compilations ==
There are a lot of hokum compilations. Some examples include:

- Please Warm My Weiner, Yazoo L-1043 (cover art by Robert Crumb) (1992)
- Hokum: Blues and Rags (1929–1930), Document 5392 (1995)
- Hokum Blues: 1924–1929, Document 5370 (1995)
- Take It Out Too Deep: Rufus & Ben Quillian (Blue Harmony Boys) (1929–30).

== Sources ==
- Lott, Eric (1993). Love and Theft: Blackface Minstrelsy and the American Working Class. New York: Oxford University Press. ISBN 0-19-507832-2.
- Toll, Robert C. (1974). Blacking Up: The Minstrel Show in Nineteenth-Century America. New York: Oxford University Press. ISBN 0-8195-6300-5.
- The Souls of Black Folk by W. E. B. DuBois (Penguin Classics, New York: Penguin Books, reprinted April 1996) ISBN 0-14-018998-X.
- Reminiscing with Sissle and Blake by Robert Kimball and William Bolsom (The Viking Press, New York, 1973)
- Demons of Disorder: Early Blackface Minstrels and Their World by Dale Cockrell (Cambridge University Press, 1997)
- The Story of a Musical Life: An Autobiography by George F. Root (Cincinnati: John Church Co., 1891; reprinted by AMS Press, New York, 1973). ISBN 0-404-07205-4.
- We'll Understand It Better By and By: Pioneering African American Gospel Composers edited by Bernice Johnson Reagon. Wade in the Water Series. (Smithsonian Institution Press, Washington, D.C, 1993).
- Black Gospel: An Illustrated History of the Gospel Sound by Vic Broughton (Blandford Press, New York, 1985)
- Where Dead Voices Gather by Nick Tosches, 2001, Little, Brown, Boston. ISBN 0-316-89507-5. On Emmett Miller.
- A Good Natured Riot: The Birth of the Grand Ole Opry by Charles K. Wolfe (Country Music Foundation Press and Vanderbilt University Press, Nashville, Tennessee, 1999)
- Bluegrass Breakdown : The Making of the Old Southern Sound by Robert Cantwell (University of Illinois Press, Chicago, 1984, reprinted 2003).
- It Came from Memphis by Robert Gordon (Pocket Books, Simon and Schuster, New York, 1995).
- Stephen Foster: America's Troubadour by John Tasker Howard. (Thomas Y. Crowell, New York, 1934; 2nd ed., 1953)
- The Encyclopedia of Country Music edited by Paul Kingsbury (Oxford University Press, New York, 1998)
- Minstrel Banjo Style various artists, liner notes, Rounder Records ROUN0321, 1994
- You Ain't Talkin' to Me: Charlie Poole and the Roots of Country Music liner notes by Henry Sapoznik, Columbia Legacy Recordings C3K 92780, 2005
- Good for What Ails You: Music of the Medicine Shows 1926–1937 liner notes by Marshall Wyatt, Old Hat Records CD-1005 (2005)
- Rocha, Alexandre Eleutério (2022). Hokum Blues: erotismo e humor em uma vertente musical silenciada (PDF) (Mestre em Música thesis) (in Portuguese). Universidade de Brasília.
- DeLune, Clair (21 September 2015). South Carolina Blues. Arcadia Publishing. p. 87. ISBN 978-1-4396-5327-2. OCLC 936538023. "hokum, which is also called "bawdy" or "dirty" blues"
- Wald, Elijah (3 August 2010). The Blues: A Very Short Introduction. Oxford University Press. p. 43. ISBN 978-0-19-975079-5. OCLC 1014220088. "flood of hokum songs established blues as a medium for [...] comic smut. There had always been dirty blues [...]"
- Cunningham, Alexandria (2018). "Make It Nasty: Black Women's Sexual Anthems and the Evolution of the Erotic Stage". Journal of Black Sexuality and Relationships. 5 (1): 63–89. doi:10.1353/bsr.2018.0015. eISSN 2376-7510. "(page 78): dirty blues was a subgenre [...] also referenced as hokum"
- Calt, Stephen (1 October 2010). Barrelhouse Words: A Blues Dialect Dictionary. University of Illinois Press. p. 125. ISBN 978-0-252-09071-4. OCLC 1156337352. "hokum: A vaudeville term [...] fun bordering on vulgarity and quite obvious [...] descriptive of material by [...] Hokum Boys [...] musical approach [...] fostered by Papa Charlie Jackson"
- Larkin, Colin (30 September 2013). The Virgin Encyclopedia of The Blues. Random House. ISBN 978-1-4481-3274-4. "'Hokum, with its connotations of verbal cleverness, was first applied to black music [...] in billing of 'Tampa Red's Hokum Jazz Band' [ Tampa Red and Georgia Tom ]"
- Hansen, Barry (2000). "A Lot of Hokum". Rhino's Cruise Through the Blues. Hal Leonard Corporation. p. 60. ISBN 978-0-87930-625-0. OCLC 39007030.
- Beaumont, Daniel (2004). "Humor". In Komara, E.; Lee, P. (eds.). The Blues Encyclopedia. Taylor & Francis. pp. 476–479. ISBN 978-1-135-95832-9.
- Southern, Eileen (1972). Readings in Black American Music. W. W. Norton. ISBN 978-0-393-02165-3.
- Sotiropoulos, Karen (2009). Staging Race: Black Performers in Turn of the Century America. Harvard University Press. ISBN 978-0-674-04387-9.
- Schwartz, Roberta Freund (2018-10-01). "How Blue Can You Get? "It's Tight Like That" and the Hokum Blues". American Music. 36 (3). University of Illinois Press: 367–393. doi:10.5406/americanmusic.36.3.0367. ISSN 0734-4392. JSTOR 10.5406/americanmusic.36.3.0367.
- Freund Schwartz, Roberta (2020), "The Blues and the Development of the African American Working Class before World War II", The Bloomsbury Handbook of Popular Music and Social Class, Bloomsbury Publishing Inc, pp. 353–368, doi:10.5040/9781501345395.ch-018, ISBN 978-1-5013-4539-5
- King, Rob (2017). Hokum!: The Early Sound Slapstick Short and Depression-Era Mass Culture. OAPEN Library. University of California Press. doi:10.1525/luminos.28. ISBN 978-0-520-28811-9.
- Birnbaum, L. (2013). "Jug Bands and Hokum". Before Elvis: The Prehistory of Rock 'n' Roll. G - Reference, Information and Interdisciplinary Subjects Series. Scarecrow Press. pp. 129–133. ISBN 978-0-8108-8638-4.
