= Georgia Grind =

Single by Louis Armstrong and his Hot Five
- A-side: "Georgia Grind"
- B-side: "Come Back Sweet Papa"
- Released: April 1926
- Recorded: February 26, 1926
- Venue: Chicago, Illinois, United States
- Genre: Jazz, dirty blues
- Length: 2:31
- Label: Okeh Records
- Songwriter(s): Spencer Williams (music), Bud Allen (lyrics)

"Georgia Grind" is a jazz and dirty blues tune, written by Spencer Williams and copyrighted by him in 1926. The lyrics were added by Bud Allen. A recording was released by Louis Armstrong with his Hot Five by Okeh Records on a 78 rpm, mono 10" shellac single record in April 1926. The melody was the same as used in the song, "Shake That Thing", written in 1925 by Papa Charlie Jackson.

The track was later included in Armstrong's box set, Hot Fives & Sevens (2000).

In addition, "Georgia Grind" was recorded by Edmonia Henderson (also in 1926), Lucille Bogan (1933) and Blue Lu Barker (1939) among many others.

== Recording ==
The personnel on this initial recording of "Georgia Grind" were Louis Armstrong (cornet, vocals), Kid Ory (trombone), Johnny Dodds (clarinet, alto saxophone) and Lil Hardin (piano, vocals) with Johnny St. Cyr (banjo). The recording was in the key of E♭ Major, and was made on February 26, 1926, in Chicago, Illinois, United States. Armstrong ignored large parts of the melody in the recording, largely talking his way through, hinting towards his scat work on his later recording, "Heebie Jeebies". Like "Heebie Jeebies," a dance was choreographed to the song as a way to assist in sales and popularity.

== Other versions ==
On July 21, 1926, and also made in Chicago, was another version of the track recorded by Edmonia Henderson. The A-side was "Georgia Grind", whilst "Dead Man Blues" written by Jelly Roll Morton was on the flip side. Morton also accompanied Henderson on both songs. Duke Ellington's Washingtonians released an instrumental version of "Georgia Grind" on Perfect Records in August 1926. It was recorded in New York. In the same year, other versions were cut by Perry Bradford's Georgia Strutters, Caroline Johnson, and by Tom Morris and his Seven Hot Babies.

In 1933, Lucille Bogan returned to New York, and, apparently to conceal her identity, began recording as 'Bessie Jackson' for the Banner label of ARC. She was accompanied on piano by Walter Roland, for her version of the song billed as "My Georgia Grind." This take included the full salacious lyrics, written by Bud Allen, to turn the number into a dirty blues standard.

Blue Lu Barker recorded her version on April 20, 1939, and it was released, crediting Barker and Danny Barker's Fly Cats, in May 1939. The tribute album, Don't You Feel My Leg: The Naughty Bawdy Blues of Blue Lu Barker (2018), was Maria Muldaur's 41st album, and included the track.

Eddie Condon and His Band released a Dixieland version in 1941 on Commodore Records. The band comprised Eddie Condon (guitar), Marty Marsala (trumpet), George Brunis (trombone), Artie Shapiro (bass), Fats Waller (piano), and George Wettling (drums). It was re-mastered and re-issued as a single in January 2013. Chris Barber recorded a live version in 1958. Hermon Hitson was briefly part of Hermon and the Rockin' Tonics, whose debut recording was "Been So Long" / "Georgia Grind" on Royal Records (1965). Frank Traynor released his version as a single in 1972. Ottilie Patterson released the song as the B-side of her 1982 single "Careless Love" (Fat Hen Records).

== Variants ==
In April 1928, Henry Williams and Eddie Anthony reworked the song and released it as "Georgia Crawl" on Columbia Records.

== Confusion ==
It is not to be confused, although in several sources often is, with an earlier ragtime tune of the same title. This was written by Ford Dabney in 1915. Considerably less successful, it was nevertheless recorded by the State Street Ramblers with Jimmy Blythe (1931) and also the Memphis Night Hawks with Roy Palmer (1932).
