= It's Tight Like That =

1928 blues song by Tampa Red and Georgia Tom

Single by Tampa Red and Georgia Tom
- B-side: "Grievin' Me Blues"
- Released: December 1928
- Recorded: October 24, 1928
- Genre: Hokum, dirty blues
- Length: 2:50
- Label: Vocalion
- Songwriter(s): Tampa Red, Georgia Tom

"It's Tight Like That" is a hokum or dirty blues song, recorded by Tampa Red and Georgia Tom on October 24, 1928. Vocalion Records issued it on the then standard 10-inch 78 rpm shellac record in December 1928. It became successful and eventually sold over seven million copies.

== Background ==
Hudson Whittaker and Thomas A. Dorsey met by playing in the backing band accompanying Ma Rainey on her numerous tours. In 1924, Rainey was accompanied by the pianist and bandleader Dorsey and the band he assembled, the Wildcats Jazz Band. They began their tour with an appearance in Chicago in April 1924 and continued, on and off, until 1928. Dorsey left the group in 1926, because of depression from which he suffered for around two years. Having recovered by 1928, he formed a partnership with the blues singer-guitarist Tampa Red. Dorsey adopted the name "Georgia Tom" and together they wrote "It's Tight Like That". The song was composed overnight due to the demand made by J. Mayo Williams of the Vocalion Records when Tampa Red approached Williams hoping to make a recording: "come back two o’clock the next day with somethin’" that is "[your] own to sing."

A Chicago street slang superlative was recounted by Georgia Tom, who helped parlay it into the song. "There used to be a phrase they used around town, you know, folks started saying, "Ah, it's tight like that! Tight like that!" Red supplied the words, and Dorsey wrote the music, modeled after Papa Charlie Jackson’s "Shake That Thing".

The title is a sly wordplay with the double meaning of being "tight" with someone, coupled with a more salacious physical familiarity. Georgia Tom later had time to regret the use of the double entendre.

== Recording ==
Give me a song, I stick to the note and play it like it is, you won't pay much attention to it. In fact it won't go anywhere. You got to always have something: a little trick, a little embellishment or something. I don't go and take it just straight; I got to put something in it to get over.

– Thomas A. Dorsey

Being based in Chicago, they had access to the record label Vocalion Records. Vocalion recorded two versions of the song in Chicago, on September 19, and October 8, 1928, but these were unreleased. It was the third recording undertaken on October 24 that year, which became the version that was issued in December. Both Tampa Red and Georgia Tom provided the vocals in a call and response style. Tampa Red on bottleneck guitar and Georgia Tom playing the piano supplied the musical accompaniment.

== Music ==
"It's Tight Like That" is performed in the key of A minor at a "surprisingly brisk" tempo of 190 beats per minute.

== Releases ==
The record was a million seller (an extraordinary achievement at that time), and went on to become a big blues hit, covered by a wide variety of blues, jazz, and country artists over the years. Eventually the record sold more than seven million copies. The B-side of the disc was recorded on October 16, 1928. It was "Grievin' Me Blues", accredited to Georgia Tom alone, even though his vocals and piano playing were accompanied by Tampa Red on guitar. That song was written by Georgia Tom.

The song is included on Tampa Red Vol.1 (May 1928 to 4 December 1953) (1999, Document Records). A version credited to "Papa Too Sweet and Harry Jones" recorded on December 11, 1928, opens the Columbia Records compilation Tampa Red: The Guitar Wizard (1994).

== Later developments ==
Billed as either "Tampa Red and Georgia Tom" or "The Hokum Boys", the duo found great success together, eventually collaborating on 60 songs between 1928 and 1932, and coining the term "hokum" to describe their guitar/piano combination with simple, racy lyrics. Several sequels of "It's Tight Like That" were waxed by Tampa Red and Georgia Tom (who, as Thomas A. Dorsey, was later to be hailed as 'the father of black gospel music').

Tampa Red's partnership with Georgia Tom ended in 1932, but Red remained much in demand as a session musician, working with John Lee "Sonny Boy" Williamson, Memphis Minnie, Big Maceo, and many others. Dorsey became the music director at the Pilgrim Baptist Church in Chicago, a role he undertook for fifty years.

== Recognition ==
The song crossed over into the mainline jazz and country music:

- "It's Tight Like That" was recorded by Jimmie Noone, McKinney's Cotton Pickers, Jimmy Bracken's Toe Ticklers (with Jack Teagarden and Benny Goodman);
- Louis Armstrong recorded "Tight Like This" in December 1928 that sounds like a response to the hokum song with his famous trumpet solo improvisation;
- Duke Ellington joined the chorus with his "Who said 'It's Tight Like That'?" in March 1929;
- Luis Russell, one of the main figures behind the New Orleans jazz transition to swing, recorded "It's Tight Like That" in January 1929.

In 2014, the Blues Hall of Fame inducted "It's Tight Like That" as a 'Classic of Blues Recording – Single or Album Track'. In an induction statement, the song is described as " a playful vocal duet to rework a hot street slang phrase, [it is] a prime example of the good-time music known as hokum".

== Discography ==
Records related to It's Tight Like That
Title	Artist	Label/catalog #	Year
It’s Tight Like That	Tampa Red’s Hokum Jug Band	Vocalion 1228	1928
It’s Tight Like That No. 2	Georgia Tom and Tampa Red	Vocalion 1244	1929
It’s Tight Like That No. 3	Georgia Tom and Tampa Red	Vocalion 1418	1929
(Honey) It’s Tight Like That	Harry Jones and Papa Too Sweet	OKeh 6581	1929
It’s Tight Like That	Tampa Red	Vocalion 1258	1929
It’s Tight Like That	McKinney’s Cotton Pickers	Victor V38013-A	1928
It’s Tight Like That	Walter Barnes and his Royal Creolians	Brunswick 4244	1928
It’s Tight Like That	Jimmie Noone’s Apex Club Orchestra, with Junie Cobb	Vocalion 1238	1928
It’s Tight Like That	Clara Smith	Columbia 14398D	1929
It’s Tight Like That	Luis Russell and his Burning Eight	OKeh 8656 Paramount R2186, Parlophone R1286	1929
It’s Tight Like That	Zach Whyte’s Chocolate Beau Brummels	Champion 15715, Supertone 9368	1929
It’s Tight Like That	Hilda Alexander and Mamie McClure	Brunswick 7069	1929
It’s Tight Like That	Southern Blues Singers, accompanied by Cow Cow Davenport	Gennett 6826	1929
It’s Tight Like That	Otis Mote	OKeh 45389	1929

== Sources ==
- Harris, Michael W. (1992). The Rise of Gospel Blues: The Music of Thomas Andrew Dorsey in the Urban Church. Oxford University Press. ISBN 0-19-506376-7.
- Humphrey, Mark (1994). Tampa Red: Guitar Wizard (CD booklet). Tampa Red. New York City: Columbia Records. CK 53235.
- Lieb, Sandra (1983). Mother of the Blues: A Study of Ma Rainey (3rd ed.). University of Massachusetts Press. ISBN 0-87023-394-7.
- Oliver, Paul; Wright, Richard (1990). Blues Fell This Morning: Meaning in the Blues. Cambridge University Press. ISBN 978-0-521-37793-5.
- O'Neal, Jim; van Singel, Amy (2013). The Voice of the Blues: Classic Interviews from Living Blues Magazine. Taylor & Francis. ISBN 978-1136707414.
- Russell, Tony (1997). The Blues: From Robert Johnson to Robert Cray. Dubai: Carlton Books. ISBN 1-85868-255-X.
- Staig, Laurence (January 26, 1993). "Obituary: Thomas Dorsey". The Independent.
- Schwartz, Roberta Freund (2018-10-01). "How Blue Can You Get? "It's Tight Like That" and the Hokum Blues". American Music. 36 (3). University of Illinois Press: 367–393. doi:10.5406/americanmusic.36.3.0367. ISSN 0734-4392. S2CID 192728133.
- Birnbaum, L. (2013). "Jug Bands and Hokum". Before Elvis: The Prehistory of Rock 'n' Roll. G - Reference, Information and Interdisciplinary Subjects Series. Scarecrow Press. pp. 129–133. ISBN 978-0-8108-8638-4.
