= Peg Leg Howell =

American musical artist (1888–1966)

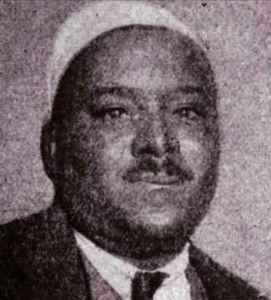
- Advertisement photo for Columbia Records, c. 1926

Background information
- Born: Joshua Barnes Howell; March 5, 1888; Eatonton, Georgia, U. S.
- Died: August 11, 1966 (aged 78) Atlanta, Georgia, U. S.
- Genres: Country blues; Piedmont blues
- Occupations: Musician; songwriter
- Instruments: Vocals; guitar
- Years active: 1923 to mid-1930s, 1963
- Labels: Columbia; Testament
- Formerly of: Eddie Anthony

Joshua Barnes Howell, known as Peg Leg Howell (March 5, 1888 – August 11, 1966), was an American blues singer-songwriter and guitarist, who connected early country blues and the later 12-bar style. He was one of the first recorded artists of the Atlanta blues scene during the pre-war period, and he was also one of the first blues musicians to ever make a race record.

== Biography ==
=== Early life ===
Joshua Barnes Howell was born on March 5, 1888, on a farm in Eatonton, Georgia, to Thomas Howell and Ruthie Myrick. During his childhood, he grew up around music, but did not take a serious interest in playing music until his early twenties. He completed school in the 9th grade, and went to work alongside his father as a farm hand.

In 1909, he reportedly stayed up one night and taught himself to play the guitar at the age of 21. He became skilled in pre-Piedmont fingerpicking and slide guitar techniques. He continued working on the farm until 1916, when he was shot during an argument with his brother-in-law, as a result of which he lost his right leg, and had to wear a prosthetic afterwards.

After his injury, Howell stopped working on the farm, and took a job at a fertilizer plant in Madison County, Georgia. He worked there for a year before he moved back to Eatonton. He then took various jobs around the area, but did not work regularly. In 1923 he moved to Atlanta, Georgia, and began working as a full-time musician. He played on street corners, mainly around Decatur Street. In 1925, he was sent to River Camp Prison in Atlanta for bootlegging liquor.

=== Career ===
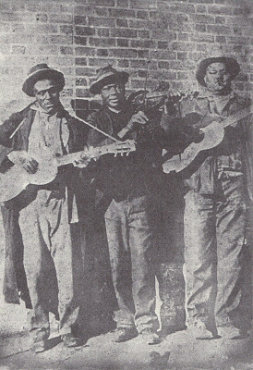
Peg-Leg Howell (right) and his band on the streets of Atlanta, 1920s.

In 1926, shortly after he was released from prison, Howell was heard playing on the streets of Atlanta and was recorded for the first time on November 8, 1926, by Columbia Records, which released "New Prison Blues", written while he was in prison; It was the first country blues record to be issued on the label. Howell received $50 plus biannual royalties from this record. He also recorded "Tishamingo Blues", "Coal Man Blues", and "Fo' Day Blues" during the same session.

Over the next three years, Columbia recorded him on several occasions, often accompanied by a small group, with Henry Williams on guitar and Eddie Anthony on fiddle. This arrangement was also known as "Peg Leg Howell and His Gang". They first recorded together on April 8, 1927, and recorded songs such as "New Jelly Roll Blues", "Beaver Slide Rag", "Sadie Lee Blues", and "Papa Stobb Blues". Howell also recorded with a mandolin player named Jim Hill on April 13, 1929, playing songs such as "Ball and Chain Blues", "Away From Home", "Monkey Man Blues," and "Chittlin' Supper". Altogether, Howell recorded a total of 28 sides for the record label, with his recorded repertoire including ballads, ragtime, and jazz, as well as blues.

=== Later life and rediscovery ===
The economic depression affected record sales after 1930, so Howell and his band continued to play on the streets of Atlanta. Howell also began selling bootleg liquor again. His best friend and guitar accompanist on many of his recordings, Eddie Anthony, died in 1934. After the mid-1930s, Howell performed only occasionally, usually whenever he was in a financial emergency. In 1952, at the age of 64, his left leg was removed as a result of complications of diabetes, and he began using a wheelchair. "Low Down Rounder's Blues" by Howell was issued on The Country Blues in 1959.

In 1963, he was "rediscovered" in dire poverty in Atlanta by the folklorist and field researcher George Mitchell and Roger Brown. Mitchell noted, "When we stopped by Shorter's Barber Shop, one of the oldest establishments on Decatur Street, we decided to ask about additional blues singers as well. After mentioning Peg Leg Howell, ten men gathered around us offering to lead us to him. Finally after the confusion had subsided and we had gotten over our shock, we picked two of the men to take us to Howell. We rode about a mile past Capitol Square, turned into a dirt road and pulled up in front of Howell's small and shabby house. Our guides were knocking loudly on the door when we heard the faint voice of a very old man telling us to come in. The house was dark and musty, but the moment I saw Howell sitting in his wheelchair in the back room, I recognized him from his pictures. He appeared to be very old, was unshaven, and had no legs. Just seconds after I introduced myself, he eagerly reached for the guitar I was holding. He took it in his large, worn hands and immediately began singing and playing."

They recorded Howell on April 11, 1963, at the age of 75; the recordings were issued on LP by Testament Records, 34 years after his last recorded sessions. It was one of Mitchell's first field-recording sessions in his long career. Howell revisited his old songs that he originally recorded in the 1920s, while also recording new material. The 10 songs that Howell recorded was compiled onto an album titled The Legendary Peg Leg Howell, which was released in 1964.

=== Death ===
Howell was admitted to Grady Memorial Hospital in 1966 for chronic nervous disease. He later died there on August 11 of that year at the age of 78, and was buried in Chestnut Hill Cemetery, located in DeKalb County, Georgia.

=== Discography ===
- "New Prison Blues"//"Fo' Day Blues" (Columbia, 1926)
- "Coal Man Blues"//"Tishamingo Blues" (1926)
- "New Jelly Roll Blues"//"Beaver Slide Rag" (1927)
- "Papa Stobb Blues"//"Sadie Lee Blues" (1927)
- "Moanin' and Groanin' Blues"//"Hobo Blues" (1927)
- "Too Tight Blues"//"Peg Leg Stomp" (1927)
- "Doin' Wrong"//"Skin Game Blues" (1927)
- "Rock and Gravel Blues"//"Low-Down Rounder Blues" (1928)
- "Please Ma'am"//"Fairy Blues" (1928)
- "Banjo Blues"//"Turkey Buzzard Blues" (1928)
- "Monkey Man Blues"//"Chittlin' Supper" (1929)
- "Broke and Hungry Blues"//"Rolling Mill Blues" (1929)
- "Turtle Dove Blues"//"Walkin' Blues" (1929)
- "Away From Home"//"Ball and Chain Blues" (1929)

== See also ==
- List of blues musicians
- List of country blues musicians
- List of Piedmont blues musicians
