= McGlennon =

McGlennon is a surname of Irish origin. Notable people with the surname include:

- Cornelius Augustine McGlennon (1878–1931), American politician
- Felix McGlennon (1856–1943), British songwriter
- John McGlennon (born 1949), American politician

== See also ==
- McClennon
