= Hokum Boys =

"Hokum Boys" was the billing (or part of the billing) of multiple jazz bands (typically, just groups of session musicians) active in 1920s and 1930s. The hokum subgenre of blues music got its name from these bands.

"Hokum", originally a vaudeville term used for a simple performance bordering on vulgarity, but hinting at a smart wordplay, was first used in a billing of a race record for Tampa Red's Hokum Jazz Band (Tampa Red and Georgia Tom). After releasing a big hit, "It's Tight Like That", with Vocalion Records (and its sequel) in 1928, the musicians went on to Paramount Records where they were called The Hokum Boys. Other recording studios joined the fray using similarly named ensembles. The groups continued into the 1930s, with Big Bill Broonzy joining forces with Georgia Tom as Famous Hokum Boys on records for the American Record Corporation, joined occasionally by Frank Brasswell, Mozelle Alderson, and possibly Arthur Petties.

Personnel of the bands varied, and identification of many musicians is speculative. The list of session musicians includes Bob Robinson, Banjo Ikey Robinson, Alex Hill, Casey Bill Weldon, Blind Blake, Aletha Dickerson, Jimmy Blythe, Teddy Edwards, Washboard Sam, and Black Bob. Ikey Robinson, Alex Hill, and Cecil Scott were billed as Hokum Trio.

== Sources ==
- Larkin, Colin (September 30, 2013). "Hokum Boys". The Virgin Encyclopedia of The Blues. Random House. ISBN 978-1-4481-3274-4.
- Hansen, Barry (2000). "A Lot of Hokum". Rhino's Cruise Through the Blues. Hal Leonard Corporation. p. 60. ISBN 978-0-87930-625-0. OCLC 39007030.
- Calt, Stephen (October 1, 2010). Barrelhouse Words: A Blues Dialect Dictionary. University of Illinois Press. p. 125. ISBN 978-0-252-09071-4. OCLC 1156337352. "hokum: A vaudeville term [...] fun bordering on vulgarity and quite obvious [...] descriptive of material by [...] Hokum Boys [...] musical approach [...] fostered by Papa Charlie Jackson"
- O'Neal, Jim; Singel, Amy van (September 5, 2013). The Voice of the Blues: Classic Interviews from Living Blues Magazine. Routledge. p. 18. ISBN 978-1-136-70741-4.
- Wald, E. (2010). The Blues: A Very Short Introduction. Very Short Introductions. Oxford University Press. ISBN 978-0-19-975287-4.
