= Hermon Hitson =

- Also known as: Herman Hitson
- Born: Hermon Lee Hitson; June 7, 1943 (age 82); Philadelphia, Pennsylvania, United States
- Genres: R&B, soul
- Occupations: Singer-songwriter, guitarist
- Years active: 1960s–present
- Labels: Atco Records

Hermon Hitson a.k.a. Herman Hitson (born June 7, 1943) is an American guitarist from Atlanta, Georgia, United States. He has played with Garnet Mimms, Joe Tex, Bobby Womack, and Wilson Pickett. Hitson has also been at the center of the controversy over the disputed Hendrix "Free Spirit" track.

== Background ==
Originally from Philadelphia, Pennsylvania, United States, Hitson grew up in Jacksonville, Florida. He formed the Sterophonics in 1959 which was his first band. at that time he only knew a few guitar chords but got the chance to play to the audience because his guitar player never turned up. Seeing a positive reaction from the audience he purchased a guitar the next day. After the Stereophonics finished he formed another band called The Rockin' Tonics. The first record he cut "Been So Long" / "Georgia Grind" on Royal Records was plugged by DJs and Hitson did quite well with it.

His song "Love Slipped Thru My Fingers" is a popular Northern Soul track.

In the late 1980s, Hitson, Freddie Terrell, and Raymond Smith formed Family Records Inc. The first artists they signed were Harrison Jones and The Voices of Harmony.

Among the musicians that have either backed or played with Hitson are the Mississippi-based guitarist J.D. Mark, who died in 2013, and The Lonely Lonely Knights. The Knights had also backed Filmore Slim, Chick Willis, and Ralph "Soul" Jackson.

== Controversy ==
Regarding the controversy over "Free Spirit", questions are asked if Hitson is the actual player and singer on the track, or if it was actually Hendrix who played on it, also being unsure on who deserves the artist credit. Some tracks that may or may not actually feature Hendrix have Hitson, Lonnie Youngblood, and Lee Moses have playing on them. Some have been produced by John Brantley.

== Later years ==
In 2005, Soul-Tay-Shus Records released You Are Too Much for the Human Heart which was a compilation of singles he recorded from 1961 to 1976. Peter Margasak, reviewer for the Chicago Reader stated that the material on the album ranged from Otis Redding styled songs to tracks similar to James Brown.

In August 2010, Herman Hitson and the Lonely Knights appeared at the Rock ’n’ Bowl in New Orleans.

== Discography ==
Singles
Name	Title	Label and cat	Year	Notes #
Hermon and the Rockin Tonics	"Been So Long" / "Georgia Grind"	Royal 2871-47		
Hermon and the Rockin Tonics	"Laughin" / "Find My Baby"	Royal 2871-50		
Herman Hitson	"You Are Too Much for the Human Heart" / "I Got That Will"	ATCO Records 45-6566	1968	Arranged by – T. Staff; Produced by – Johnny Brantley
Herman Hitson	"Yes You Did" / "Better To Have Loved"	Minit 32072	1969	Produced by Johnny Brantley; Arranged by T. Staff
Hermon Hitson	"She's A Bad Girl" / "Show Some Sign"	Minit 32096 S	1970	Produced by Johnny Brantley; Arranged by Lee Moses
Herman Hitson	"You Can't Keep A Good Man Down" / "Ain't No Other Way	Sweet Rose Records O-25, O-26	1972	
Hermon Hitson	"Buckbboard" / "Ayana" (The Baby Song)	Hitsong HH-001	1979	Side 1 Produced by Hermon Hitson, Arranged by Hermon Baaqar Side 2 Produced by Hermon Baaqar, Eddie Maxey; Arranged by Darryl Cooper, Kenny Davis, H. Hitson

CD singles
Title	Label and cat	Year	Notes #
"I Should Have Kept My Big Mouth Closed"	Sweet Rose Express Records		
"Dream Weaver", "Letters I'll Never Mail"	Sweet Rose Express Records		

Albums
Title	Label and cat	Year	Notes #
You Are Too Much for the Human Heart	Soul-Tay-Shus Records STS CD 6352	2005	
Yesterday, Today and Tomorrow	Sweet Rose Express	2008	
Live at The Earl	Sweet Rose Express		Supporting band: Freddie Terrell and the Buckboard Express Band
Hermon Hitson's – Free Spirit			
Brooklyn Soul presents Live in Concert	Sweet Rose Express Records	2010	
