= Free Spirit (Hermon Hitson song) =

1966 song

"Free Spirit" is a 1966 song by blues session player Hermon Hitson (Philadelphia, 1943), which was mistakenly released as the title track of two albums of bootleg Jimi Hendrix recordings. The title track of both Free Spirit bootleg albums, and other songs recorded in the same sessions, contained contributions by Lonnie Youngblood and Lee Moses, but no verified content by Hendrix himself. A version of "House of the Rising Sun" is sometimes labelled as Hendrix, yet is Hermon Hitson.
