= Shave 'Em Dry =

Single by Ma Rainey
- B-side: "Farewell Daddy Blues"
- Released: 1924
- Recorded: Chicago, August 1924
- Genre: Dirty blues
- Length: 2:34
- Label: Paramount
- Songwriter(s): Ma Rainey, William Jackson (credited)

"Shave 'Em Dry" is a dirty blues song, first recorded by Ma Rainey in August 1924 in Chicago. It was released on Paramount Records in 1924. Rainey was accompanied on the recording by two unknown guitarists (one of them was possibly Miles Pruitt). The record was advertised in The Chicago Defender on the same date as the record's release.

As a turn of phrase, "Shave 'Em Dry" can be interpreted as referring to mean any aggressive action, alternatively (as here) as meaning sexual intercourse without any preliminary 'love-making'. Big Bill Broonzy stated "Shave 'em dry is what you call makin' it with a woman; you ain't doin' nothin', just makin' it." However, Ma Rainey in her version made no specific reference to its meaning or content. Rudi Blesh commented upon its importance as an archaic eight-bar blues which was "complete, harmonically and poetically". Rainey, previously a minstrel and tent-show singer, quite possibly knew of the broad outline of the number and "Shave' Em Dry" was probably in her repertoire from her earliest professional years.

The song has been credited as being written by Ma Rainey and William Jackson or H. Jackson (William Henry "Papa Charlie" Jackson) -- and also credited as 'traditional' in various sources. An earlier ragtime piano tune entitled "Shave 'Em Dry" was copyrighted in May 1917 in St. Louis, Missouri, by composer Sam Wishnuff.

== Early versions ==
Papa Charlie Jackson's version was recorded around February 1925 in Chicago, and released by Paramount Records in April that year. He was accompanied on guitar by Blind Blake.

James "Boodle It" Wiggins recorded his version around October 1929 in Grafton, Wisconsin. With a boogie-woogie accompaniment by the pianist, Charlie Spand, it was also issued by Paramount Records (12916).

Possibly the most significant version was recorded by Lucille Bogan, although billed as 'Bessie Jackson', on March 5, 1935. It was released in July that year by the Banner label of ARC. It was also released on Melotone Records (M 13342), Oriole Records (8487), Romeo Records (5487), and Perfect Records (0332). Bogan's original recording of "Shave 'Em Dry" (with Walter Roland (piano) and Josh White (guitar)) appears to be a cleaned up version. Nevertheless, Bogan's record company did not renew her contract in 1935. There were two takes of "Shave 'Em Dry". An even more explicit cut was issued much later on a compilation album, Raunchy Business: Hot Nuts & Lollypops (1991). The unexpurgated alternate take has explicit sexual references, a unique record of the lyrics sung in after-hours adult clubs. According to Keith Briggs' liner notes for Document Records Complete Recordings, these were recorded either for the fun of the recording engineers, or for "clandestine distribution as a 'Party Record.'" Briggs notes that Bogan seems to be unfamiliar with the lyrics, reading them as she sings them, potentially surprised by them herself.

In November 1936, Lil Johnson recorded "New Shave 'Em Dry", with Alfred Bell (trumpet) and Black Bob (piano). Her lightness in voice and melodic sympathy did not disguise the relation to Wiggins styled tune. It was released by Vocalion Records (13428).

== Lyrical variations ==
In Ma Rainey's original recording, using her strong but relaxed voice, she sang the verse before hollering the refrain. Her opening lines are:

Here's one thing I don't understand,
Why a good–lookin' woman loves a workin' man,
Eeh, hey, daddy won't you shave 'em dry?
Goin' 'way to wear you off my mind,
You keeps me broke and hungry, daddy all the time,
Eeeh, hey, daddy let me shave 'em dry

Bogan's two versions show a more radical variation. Her originally issued recording has the warning:

All you keg women, you better put on the wall,
'Cause I'm gonna get drunk and do my dirty talk,
The monkey and the baboon playin' in the grass,
Well the monkey got mad and whipped his yas, yas, yas,
Talkin' 'bout shave 'em, mama's gonna shave 'em dry

The more notorious recording, albeit with Walter Roland again accompanying and yelling out encouragement, commenced in a 'dirty talk' manner:

I got nipples on my titties big as the end of my thumb,
I got somethin' 'tween my legs 'll make a dead man come

== Later re-releases ==
Rainey's original version appeared on the compilation album Counting the Blues (2001) on TKO Records. Bogan's rendition appears on a various artists compilation album, Street Walkin' Blues, issued in 1990 by Stash Records. The song was included on the 1994 album, Complete Recorded Works, Vol. 3 (1934-1935), released by Document Records. This third and final volume of Lucille Bogan's complete works included three versions of "Shave 'Em Dry". AllMusic noted:

The first, a cover of a song by Ma Rainey, is a straightforward blues garnished with traditional references to interpersonal relationships and straight-edged razor blades. The two unissued takes could never have been put before the public in the '30s because of the outrageously pornographic lyrics, but were most likely quite popular on the private party circuit. Stash Records made an obscene take available to an appreciative new generation in 1976 on their Copulatin' Blues collection. The sexual imagery is every bit as extreme as the smuttiest outbursts of Jelly Roll Morton's 1938 Library of Congress sessions. After bragging about nipples as stiff as thumbs and seemingly Olympic bouts of frenzied copulation, Bogan (or Bessie Jackson, as she was then called) conjures up a weird architectural edifice as the man's erect penis poses as a church steeple and his sphincter becomes the portal, through which "... the crabs walks in like people!" After describing this bizarre hallucination ... she busts out laughing and has to struggle to contain herself in order to finish her wild performance.

The song was also included on Shave 'Em Dry: The Best of Lucille Bogan, issued in May 2004 by Columbia Records.

== Other versions ==
The Asylum Street Spankers recorded a version of the song on their 1996 album, Spanks for the Memories. Others who have recorded versions of the track include; Jimmy Yancey, Donald Harrison, Brett Marvin, Dr. John, Terry Dactyl and the Dinosaurs, Miraculous Mule (on Two Tonne Testimony (2017)), Sister Rosetta Tharpe, and The Dinner Is Ruined.
