= McClendon =

McClendon is a surname of Scottish and Irish origin.

Notable people named McClendon include:

== As a surname ==
- Aubrey McClendon (1959–2016), chief executive officer, chairman, and co-founder of Chesapeake Energy
- Brian McClendon (born 1964), inventor of Google Earth
- Bryan McClendon (born 1983), college football running backs coach for the University of Georgia Bulldogs
- Charles McClendon (1923–2001), LSU head football coach in the 1960s and the 1970s
- Fannie McClendon (born 1920), United States military officer
- James William McClendon, Jr. (1924–2000), Christian theologian in the Anabaptist tradition
- Jesse Francis McClendon (1880–1976), American chemist, zoologist and physiologist
- Lloyd McClendon (born 1959), American baseball player and manager
- Reiley McClendon (born 1990), American actor
- Rose McClendon (1884–1936), African American Broadway actress of the 1920s
- Ruth McClendon (1943–2017), American politician
- Sarah McClendon (1910–2003), long-time White House reporter who covered presidential politics for a half-century
- Skip McClendon (born 1964), American football player
- Warren McClendon (born 2001), American football player
- Willie McClendon (born 1957), American football player

== As a given name ==
- McClendon Curtis (born 1999), American football player

== See also ==
- McClendon-McDougald Gymnasium, 3,056-seat multi-purpose arena in Durham, North Carolina
