= Eddie Anthony =

American country blues and jazz musician

Edward Anthony (1890 – 1934) was an American country blues and jazz musician. He played the violin.

His style of playing, primarily accompanying Peg Leg Howell, offered the rarity of black string band music, which disappeared with the advent of the recording of blues guitarists. Anthony worked with Howell throughout the 1920s and early 1930s. He also recorded "Georgia Crawl" with Henry Williams, a re-working of the earlier Spencer Williams penned song "Georgia Grind", as well as "Lonesome Blues" (1928).

Anthony died in Atlanta, Georgia, United States, in 1934.
