= Coley Jones =

American country blues mandolin player

- Born: late 1880s
- Died: Unknown
- Genres: Country blues
- Occupation: Musician
- Instruments: Vocal; Guitar; Mandolin

Coley Jones (late 1880s – Unknown) was an American country blues mandolin player popular in Dallas, Texas, in the 1920s. Much of Jones's background, such as his residency, date of birth, and death are obscure, but he is best remembered for leading and recording with The Dallas String Band, with their most known song being the traditional Irish folk tune, "Drunkard's Special."

Jones was born sometime in the late-1880s, in Texas, and was associated with music at an early age, first with his family ensemble, which was led by his father, guitarist Coley Jones Senior. With Coley Jones split between duties as the mandolin player and an additional guitarist, the group ventured to performances in various dances, outside theaters, and town squares throughout the state. In 1903, it was first confirmed, through tentative documentation, that Jones had established residency in Dallas, where he was known to reside, until the end of the 1920s, and is presumed to remain for the majority of his life since nothing verifies a change of location. During that time, Jones began his professional career as a member of a traveling minstrel show.

Between December 1927 and December 1929, Jones recorded compositions for Columbia Records, first as a solo act accompanying himself with guitar and providing vocals. Among the songs was "Drunkard's Special," which originated (as stated above) from Irish folk music ballads, with alternate titles including "The Merry Cuckold and the Kind Wife" and "Three Nights Drunk." Jones's version later was featured on Harry Smith's prominent compilation album, Anthology of American Folk Music, in 1952, along with many of his contemporaries' recordings. Jones track, "Dallas Rag", best exemplified his expertise at mandolin playing. In addition, Jones was an in-demand session musician, as he worked as a guitarist on tracks by Bobbie Cadillac and Texas Bill Day. His conspicuous presence in the music scene saw Jones as a transitional musical figure, resulting in a distinct Texas-influenced blues sound.

All the while, Jones was involved in the group, the Satisfied Five, which included Herbert Cowans, and used to broadcast live from Baker Hotel and radio station WFAA. At approximately the same timeframe, Jones was also a member of the Dallas String Band, alongside Marco Washington on double bass, Sam Harris on guitar and several sidemen. The band produced ten sides during their existence, with each one displaying the group's complex instrumental abilities. The Dallas Strings later evolved into the Coley Jones String Band, notably for including T-Bone Walker. By the end of 1929, no further documentation of Jones is found though it is generally thought he still was performing in Dallas well into the 1930s.
