= Champion Records (Richmond, Indiana) =

American record label, founded in 1925

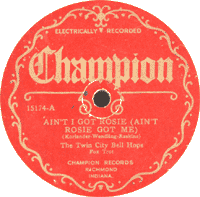
Twin City Bellhops - Ain’t I Got Rosie, 1926

Champion Records was a record label in Richmond, Indiana, founded in 1925 by the Starr Piano Company as a division of Gennett Records, which was also in Richmond. Champion released budget versions of discs issued by Gennett. Its issues included race records and jazz. In 1934, Champion closed and the trademark was sold to Decca Records, which brought the label back from 1935 to 1936.
