= George McClennon =

American musician

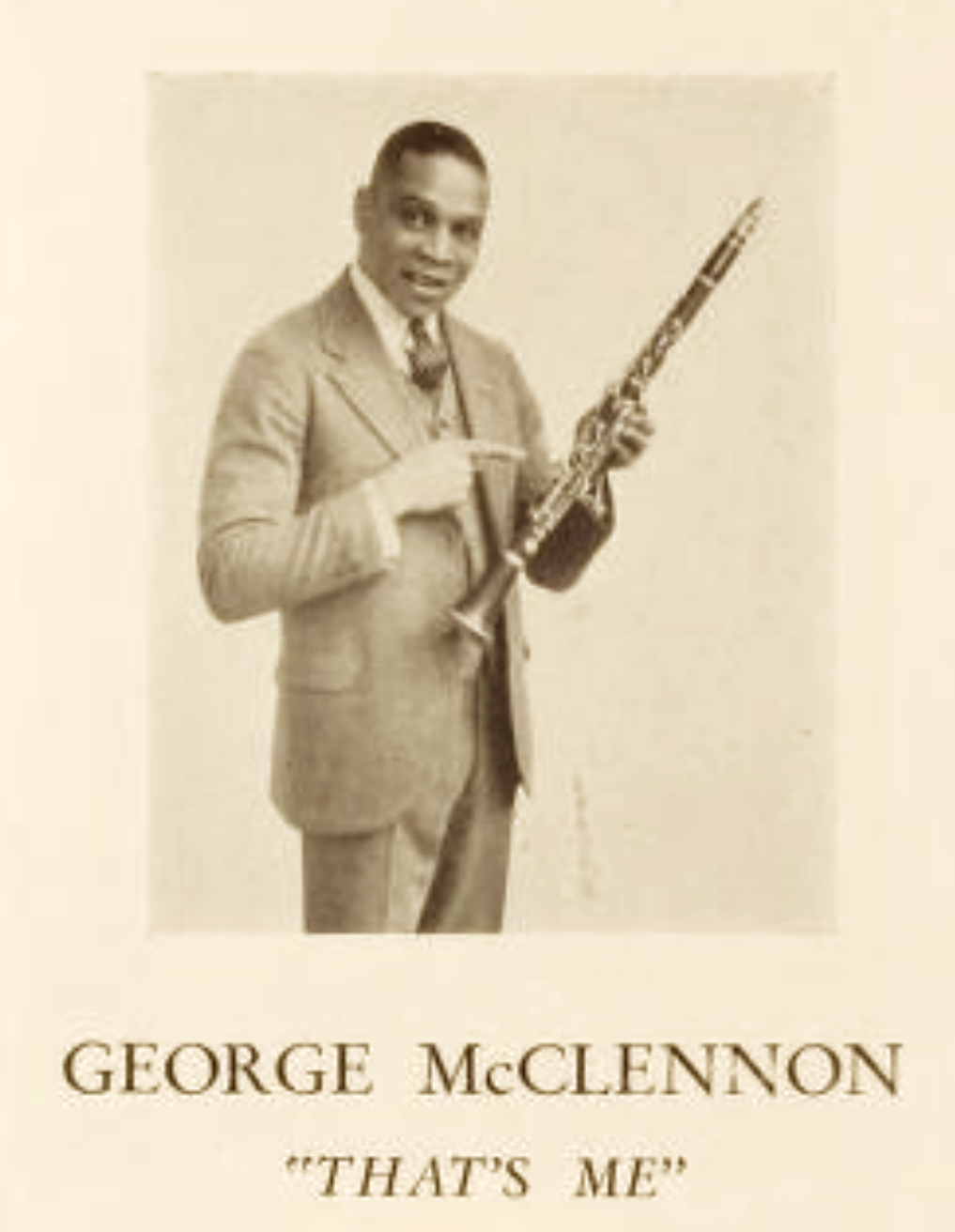

George McClennon (died 1937, Chicago, Illinois, United States) was an American jazz clarinetist, singer, and dancer.

McClennon was the adoptive son of Bert Williams and worked in theater revues and in vaudeville in the 1910s. As a clarinetist, he specialized in the style known as gas pipe clarinet, using the instrument to make noises that sounded like animals or sound effects. He was able to dance wildly as he played for comic effect and often performed in blackface. He played with Eddie Heywood and Willie "The Lion" Smith, and recorded with a group called the Harlem Trio and under his own name for Okeh Records in 1924-1926. Sidemen on these recordings included Heywood, Buddy Christian, Bob Fuller, Charlie Irvis, John Lindsay, Tom Morris, and Clarence Williams. He died of tuberculosis in 1937.

== Discography ==
- "Dark Alley Blues"/"Box of Blues" (Okeh 8143, 1923)
- "Michigan Water Blues"/"New Orleans Wiggle" (Okeh 8150, 1924)
- "Cut Throat Blues"/"Larkin Street Blues" (Okeh 8214, 1925)
- "Anybody Here Want to Try My Cabbage?"/"Home Alone Blues" (Okeh 8236, 1925)
- "Stolen Kisses (Are the Sweetest)"/"While You're Sneaking Out (Somebody Else Is Eazin' In)" (Okeh 8329, 1926)
- "Bologny"/"Everybody But Me" (Okeh 8337, 1925)
- "Cotton Club Stomp"/"Pig's Foot Blues" (Okeh 8397, 1926)
- "Disaster"/"Narrow Escape" (Okeh 8406, 1926)
