= Black Bob (musician) =

American blues pianist

Black Bob (fl. 1930s) was the pseudonym used by an American blues piano player, based in Chicago, who recorded widely in the 1930s accompanying other performers. His real name is unknown, but suggestions have included Bob Hudson, Bob Robinson, Bob Alexander, and Bob Schanault (or Chenault).

Almost nothing is known of his life beyond his recordings. According to Chicago pianist Charlie West, he became known as Black Jack in Cincinnati, Ohio, before moving around 1927 to Chicago where he adopted the name Black Bob. Reportedly, Big Bill Broonzy thought that his real name was Robert Alexander, though Memphis Slim gave his name as Bob Hudson. It was once erroneously suggested that Black Bob was a pseudonym for Bob Call. Reviewing the evidence, researcher Bob Eagle raised the possibility that he may have been the Bob Schanault (possibly misspelled) who recorded with Memphis Minnie in 1936.

Black Bob was the pianist on many Chicago blues recordings of the mid and late 1930s, notably for the Bluebird and Vocalion labels. His recordings included sessions by Broonzy, Amos Easton, Jazz Gillum, Lil Johnson, Red Nelson, Kansas Joe McCoy, Memphis Minnie, Merline Johnson, Papa Charlie McCoy, Tampa Red, Casey Bill Weldon, and Washboard Sam. One reviewer described his "muscular runs and rippling fills... clearly... an accomplished professional of his day." Although he seems not to have recorded after 1938 or perhaps 1941, Memphis Minnie reported that she both performed and recorded with him in her backing band as late as 1954.

Nothing is known of his later life.
