= Lil Johnson =

American dirty blues and hokum singer (born 1900; fl.1929–1937)

- Born: 1900
- Genres: Dirty blues; hokum
- Occupations: Singer
- Years active: 1929–1937

Lil Johnson (fl. 1920s–1930s, born 1900, date of death and places of birth and death unknown) was an American singer who recorded dirty blues and hokum songs in the 1920s and 1930s.

== Career ==
"Get 'Em From the Peanut Man (Hot Nuts)", performed by Johnson in March 1936.

No details of Johnson's origins or early life are known. She first recorded in Chicago in 1929, accompanied by the pianists Montana Taylor and Charles Avery on five songs, including "Rock That Thing". Johnson did not return to the recording studio until 1935, when her more risqué songs included "Get 'Em from the Peanut Man (Hot Nuts)", "Anybody Want to Buy My Cabbage?", and "Press My Button (Ring My Bell)" ("Come on baby, let's have some fun / Just put your hot dog in my bun"). She also recorded a version of "Keep A-Knockin'", which later became a hit for Little Richard.

From Johnson's second session onwards, she formed a partnership with the ragtime-influenced pianist Black Bob, who provided ebullient support for her increasingly suggestive lyrics. In 1936 and 1937, she recorded over 40 songs, mostly for Vocalion Records, some featuring Big Bill Broonzy on guitar and Lee Collins on trumpet. In November 1936, Johnson recorded "New Shave 'Em Dry", with Alfred Bell (trumpet) and Black Bob (piano). Her other songs included "Was I?", "My Stove's in Good Condition", "Take Your Hand Off It" and "Buck Naked Blues".

Johnson sang in a vigorous and sometimes abrasive manner. All her songs have been anthologized on later blues collections. There is no record of what became of Johnson after her recording career ended in 1937.

== Recordings ==
- Lil Johnson Vols 1–3, Document Records
