= Lucille Bogan =

American blues singer (1897–1948)

Background information
- Also known as: Bessie Jackson
- Born: Lucile Anderson; April 1, 1897; Birmingham, Alabama or Amory, Mississippi, U.S. (disputed)
- Died: August 10, 1948 (aged 51) Los Angeles, California, U.S.
- Genres: Classic female blues, dirty blues
- Occupations: Singer, songwriter
- Years active: 1923–1935

Lucille Bogan (née Anderson; April 1, 1897 – August 10, 1948) was an American classic female blues singer and songwriter, among the first to be recorded. She also recorded under the pseudonym Bessie Jackson. Music critic Ernest Borneman noted that Bogan was one of "the big three of the blues", along with Ma Rainey and Bessie Smith. Many of Bogan's songs have been recorded by later blues and jazz musicians.

Many of her songs were sexually explicit, and she is generally considered to have been a "dirty blues" musician.

In 2022, she was inducted into the Blues Hall of Fame.

== Life and career ==
She was born Lucile Anderson, the daughter of Gussie and Wylie Anderson. According to some sources, she was born in Amory, Mississippi, but according to her entry in the 1900 census her birthplace was Birmingham, Alabama. In 1914, she married Nazareth Lee Bogan, a railwayman, and gave birth to a son, Nazareth Jr., in either 1915 or 1916. She later divorced Bogan and married James Spencer.

She first recorded vaudeville songs for Okeh Records in New York in 1923, with the pianist Henry Callens. Later that year she recorded "Pawn Shop Blues" in Atlanta, Georgia; this was the first time a black blues singer had been recorded outside New York or Chicago. In 1927 she began recording for Paramount Records in Grafton, Wisconsin, where she recorded her first big success, "Sweet Petunia", which was covered by Blind Blake. She also recorded for Brunswick Records, backed by Tampa Red.

By 1930, her songs tended to concern drinking and sex, such as "Sloppy Drunk Blues" (written and first recorded by Bogan but released first by Leroy Carr in 1930 then by Bogan the following year, later recorded by others) and "Tricks Ain't Walkin' No More" (later recorded by Memphis Minnie). She also recorded the original version of "Black Angel Blues", which (as "Sweet Little Angel") was covered by B. B. King and many others. With her experience in some of the rowdier juke joints of the 1920s, many of Bogan's songs, most of which she wrote herself, have thinly veiled humorous sexual references. The theme of prostitution, in particular, featured prominently in several of her recordings. One of these was "Groceries on the Shelf (Piggly Wiggly)", which was originally written and recorded by Charlie "Specks" McFadden. Piggly Wiggly is the name of a supermarket chain operating in the South and the Midwest, which pioneered self-service grocery sales. Bogan used this self-service notion in her amended lyrics to the song, part of which ran, "My name is Piggly Wiggly and I swear you can help yourself, And you've got to have your greenback, and it don't take nothin' else".

In 1933, she returned to New York, and, apparently to conceal her identity, began recording as Bessie Jackson for the Banner label of ARC. She was usually accompanied on piano by Walter Roland, with whom she recorded over 100 songs between 1933 and 1935, including some of her biggest commercial successes, "Seaboard Blues", "Troubled Mind", and "Superstitious Blues". Her other songs include "Stew Meat Blues", "Coffee Grindin' Blues", "My Georgia Grind" (accompanied on piano by Charles Avery), "Honeycomb Man", "Mr. Screw Worm in Trouble", and "Bo Hog Blues".

Her final recordings with Roland and Josh White include two takes of "Shave 'Em Dry", recorded in New York on Tuesday, March 5, 1935. The unexpurgated alternate take is notorious for its explicit sexual references, a unique record of the lyrics sung in after-hours adult clubs. According to Keith Briggs' liner notes for Document Records Complete Recordings, these were recorded either for the fun of the recording engineers, or for "clandestine distribution as a 'Party Record'". Briggs notes that Bogan seems to be unfamiliar with the lyrics, reading them as she sings them, potentially surprised by them herself. Another of her songs, "B.D. Woman's Blues", takes the position of a "bull dyke" ("B.D."), with the lyrics "Comin' a time, B.D. women, they ain't gonna need no men", "They got a head like a sweet angel and they walk just like a natural man" and "They can lay their jive just like a natural man."

She appears not to have recorded after 1935. She managed her son's jazz group, Bogan's Birmingham Busters, for a time, before moving to Los Angeles shortly before her death from coronary sclerosis in 1948. She is interred at the Lincoln Memorial Park, in Carson, California.

In 2016 the Killer Blues Project placed a headstone for Lucille Bogan.

In 2022, she was posthumously inducted into the Blues Hall of Fame. The citation noted that "Bogan recorded some of the most memorable blues songs of the pre-World War II era, including some that were landmarks in blues and some that continue to sensationalize her reputation decades after her death".

== Discography ==
=== Singles ===
==== As Lucille Bogan ====
List of singles, with A-side and B-side, showing year released and label
A-side	B-side	Year	Label
"Chirpin' the Blues"	"Triflin' Blues (Daddy Don't You Trifle on Me)"	1923	Okeh
"Lonesome Daddy Blues"	"Don't Mean You No Good Blues"	1923	Okeh
"The Pawn Shop Blues"	"Grievious Blues" (by Fannie Goosby)	1923	Okeh
"Levee Blues"	"Sweet Patunia"	1927	Paramount
"Jim Tampa Blues"	"Kind Stella Blues"	1927	Paramount
"Doggone Wicked Blues"	"Oklahoma Man Blues"	1927	Paramount
"Women Won't Need No Men"	"War Time Man Blues"	1927	Paramount
"Craving Whiskey Blues"	"Nice and Kind Blues"	1927	Paramount
"Pay Roll Blues"	"New Way Blues"	1929	Brunswick
"Coffee Grindin' Blues"	"Pot Hound Blues"	1929	Brunswick
"My Georgia Grind"	"Whiskey Selling Woman"	1930	Brunswick
"They Ain't Walking No More"	"Dirty Treatin' Blues"	1930	Brunswick
"Black Angel Blues"	"Tricks Ain't Walking No More"	1931	Brunswick
"Crawlin' Lizard Blues"	"Struttin' My Stuff"	1931	Brunswick
"Sloppy Drunk Blues"	"Alley Boogie"	1931	Brunswick

==== As Bessie Jackson ====
List of singles, with A-side and B-side, showing year released and label
A-side	B-side	Year	Label
"Seaboard Blues"	"Troubled Mind"	1933	Banner, Conqueror, Melotone, Oriole, Perfect, Romeo
"House Top Blues"	"T N & O Blues"	1933	Banner, Conqueror, Melotone, Oriole, Perfect, Romeo
"Roll and Rattler"	"Groceries on the Shelf"	1933	Banner, Conqueror, Melotone, Oriole, Perfect, Romeo
"Superstitious Blues"	"My Baby Come Back"	1933	Banner, Conqueror, Melotone, Oriole, Perfect, Romeo
"Mean Twister" (with Walter Scott)	"Baking Powder Blues" (with Walter Scott)	1933	Banner, Conqueror, Melotone, Oriole, Perfect, Romeo
"New Muscle Shoals Blues"	"Red Cross Man"	1933	Banner, Conqueror, Melotone, Oriole, Perfect, Romeo
"Sweet Man, Sweet Man"	"Down in Boogie Alley"	1934	Banner, Conqueror, Melotone, Oriole, Perfect, Romeo
"Drinking Blues"	"Boogan Ways Blues"	1934	Banner, Conqueror, Melotone, Oriole, Perfect, Romeo
"Reckless Woman"	"Tired as I Can Be"	1934	Banner, Conqueror, Melotone, Oriole, Perfect, Romeo
"Pig Iron Sally"	"My Man Is Boogan Me"	1934	Banner, Conqueror, Melotone, Oriole, Perfect, Romeo
"Changed Ways Blues"	"I Hate That Train Called the M and O"	1934	Banner, Conqueror, Melotone, Oriole, Perfect, Romeo
"Walkin' Blues"	"Forty-Two Hundred Blues"	1934	Banner, Conqueror, Melotone, Oriole, Perfect, Romeo
"Stew Meat Blues"	"Skin Game Blues"	1935	Banner, Conqueror, Melotone, Oriole, Perfect, Romeo
"Barbecue Bess"	"Shave 'Em Dry"	1935	Banner, Conqueror, Melotone, Oriole, Perfect, Romeo
"That's What My Baby Likes"	"Man Stealer Blues"	1935	Banner, Conqueror, Melotone, Oriole, Perfect, Romeo
"Jump Steady Daddy"	"B.D. Woman's Blues"	1935	Banner, Conqueror, Melotone, Oriole, Perfect, Romeo
"You Got to Die Some Day"	"Lonesome Midnight Blues"	1936	Banner, Conqueror, Melotone, Oriole, Perfect, Romeo

=== Compilation albums ===
List of compilation albums, with selected details
Title	Details
Alabama Blues (1930–1935) (with Walter Roland)	Released: 1968; Label: Roots
(1927–1935) (with Walter Roland)	Released: 1969; Label: Yazoo
(1923–1935)	Released: 1989; Label: RST
Complete Recorded Works in Chronological Order, Volume 1	Released: 2 June, 1993; Label: Document
Complete Recorded Works in Chronological Order, Volume 2	Released: 2 June, 1993; Label: Document
Complete Recorded Works in Chronological Order, Volume 3	Released: 2 June, 1993; Label: Document
Reckless Woman, 1927–1935	Released: 2000; Label: EPM Musique
The Essential (with Walter Roland)	Released: 2002; Label: Classic Blues
Shave 'Em Dry: The Best of Lucille Bogan	Released: May 4, 2004; Label: Columbia
