= Papa Charlie Jackson =

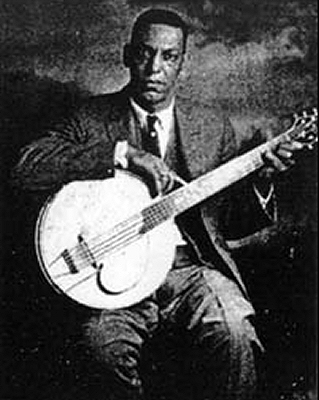

Background information
- Born: William Henry Jackson; November 10, 1887; New Orleans, Louisiana, U.S.
- Died: May 7, 1938 (aged 50) Chicago, Illinois, U.S.
- Genres: Blues
- Occupations: Musician; songster
- Instruments: Guitar; vocals; banjo; ukulele

William Henry "Papa Charlie" Jackson (November 10, 1887 – May 7, 1938) was an early African American bluesman and songster who accompanied himself with a banjo guitar, a guitar, or a ukulele. His recording career began in 1924. Much of his life remains a mystery, but his draft card lists his birthplace as New Orleans, Louisiana, and his death certificate states that he died in Chicago, Illinois, on May 7, 1938.

== Career ==
Jackson began his career playing in minstrel shows and medicine shows. From the early 1920s into the 1930s, he played frequent club dates in Chicago and was noted for busking at Chicago's Maxwell Street Market. In August 1924, he recorded the commercially successful "Airy Man Blues" and "Papa's Lawdy Lawdy Blues" for Paramount Records. In April 1925, Jackson released his version of "Shave 'Em Dry". One of his subsequent tracks, "Salty Dog Blues", became his most famous song. Among his recordings are several in which he accompanied classic female blues singers, such as Ida Cox, Hattie McDaniel, and Ma Rainey.

According to the blues writer Bruce Eder, Jackson achieved "a musical peak of sorts in September of 1929 when he got to record with his longtime idol, Blind Arthur Blake, often known as the king of ragtime guitar during this period. 'Papa Charlie and Blind Blake Talk About It' parts one and two are among the most unusual sides of the late '20s, containing elements of blues jam session, hokum recording, and ragtime." A few more recordings for the Paramount label followed in 1929 and 1930. In 1934, Jackson recorded for Okeh Records, and the following year he recorded with Big Bill Broonzy. Altogether, Jackson recorded 66 sides during his career.

== Selected Recordings ==
- "Airy Man Blues" (1924)
- "Shake that Thing" (1925)
- "All I Want is a Spoonful" (1925)
- "Bad Luck Woman" (1926)
- "Let's Get Along" (1926)
- "Baby, Don't You Be So Mean" (1927)
- "Ash Tray Blues" (1928)
- "Baby Papa Needs His Loving" (1929)
- "Baby Please Loan Me Your Heart" (1929)

== Legacy ==
Jackson was an influential figure in blues music. He was the first self-accompanied blues musician to make records. He was one of the first musicians of the hokum genre, which uses comic, often sexually suggestive lyrics and lively, danceable rhythms. He wrote or was the first to record several songs that became blues standards, including "All I Want Is a Spoonful" and "Salty Dog". Nonetheless, he has received little attention from blues historians.

Jackson's "Shake That Thing" was covered by Mother McCree's Uptown Jug Champions in 1964. "Loan Me Your Heart" appeared on the Wildpary Sheiks' eponymous album in 2002. The Carolina Chocolate Drops recorded "Your Baby Ain't Sweet Like Mine" on their Grammy Award–winning 2010 album, Genuine Negro Jig, and often played the song in interviews after its release.

A brief selection from "Shake That Thing" was used in the television series Sanford and Son, in the 1973 episode entitled "The Blind Mellow Jelly Collection", in which Fred Sanford, played by Redd Foxx, danced and sang along with it.

In 2013 the Killer Blues Headstone Project placed a headstone for Charlie Jackson at Lincoln Cemetery in Chicago.

== See also ==
- Four Eleven Forty Four
- List of banjo players
- List of blues musicians
- List of country blues musicians
- Music of Louisiana
