= Leroy Carr =

American blues singer, songwriter and pianist (1904/5–1935)

Background information
- Born: March 27, 1904 or 1905; Nashville, Tennessee, U.S.
- Died: April 29, 1935 (aged 30–31) Indianapolis, Indiana
- Genre: Blues
- Occupations: Musician; songwriter
- Instruments: Piano; vocals
- Years active: 1920s–1935
- Labels: Vocalion; Bluebird

Leroy Carr (March 27, 1904 or 1905 – April 29, 1935) was an American blues singer, songwriter and pianist who developed a laid-back, crooning technique and whose popularity and style influenced such artists as Nat King Cole and Ray Charles. Music historian Elijah Wald has called him "the most influential male blues singer and songwriter of the first half of the 20th century". He first became famous for "How Long, How Long Blues", his debut recording released by Vocalion Records in 1928.

== Life and career ==
Leroy Carr was born March 27, 1905 in Nashville, Tennessee. His parents were John Carr, a laborer at Vanderbilt University, and Katie Lytle, a domestic worker. After his parents separated, Carr moved to Indianapolis, Indiana with his mother. Carr was a self-taught piano player. After dropping out of high school, Carr travelled with a circus, and in the early 1920s served in the U.S. Army. Carr returned to Indianapolis and worked in a meat-packing plant. He was married and had one daughter. Carr was convicted of bootlegging and served a year at the Indiana State Penitentiary.

Carr had a longtime partnership with the guitarist Scrapper Blackwell. His light bluesy piano combined with Blackwell's melodic jazz guitar attracted a sophisticated black audience. The two recorded with Vocalion Records beginning in the 1920s. His first hit was "How Long, How Long Blues", recorded in 1928. Elijah Wald described Carr's music as "carefully written, blending soulful poetry with wry humor, and his music had a light, lilting swing that could shift in a moment to a driving boogie. Rather than Smith's vaudeville jazz combos or Jefferson's idiosyncratic country picking, Carr sang over the solid beat of his piano and the biting guitar of his constant partner Francis (Scrapper) Blackwell. The outcome was a hip, urban club style that signaled a new era in popular music".

Carr was among the most prolific and popular blues artists between 1928 and 1935. His recording career was cut short by his early death, but he produced a large body of work. Some of his most famous songs include "Papa's on the House Top" (1931), "When the Sun Goes Down" (1931), "Blues Before Sunrise" (1932), "Midnight Hour Blues" (1932), and "Hurry Down Sunshine" (1934). He recorded for Vocalion until he signed with Victor's Bluebird imprint, where he made his final recordings.

== Last recordings and death ==
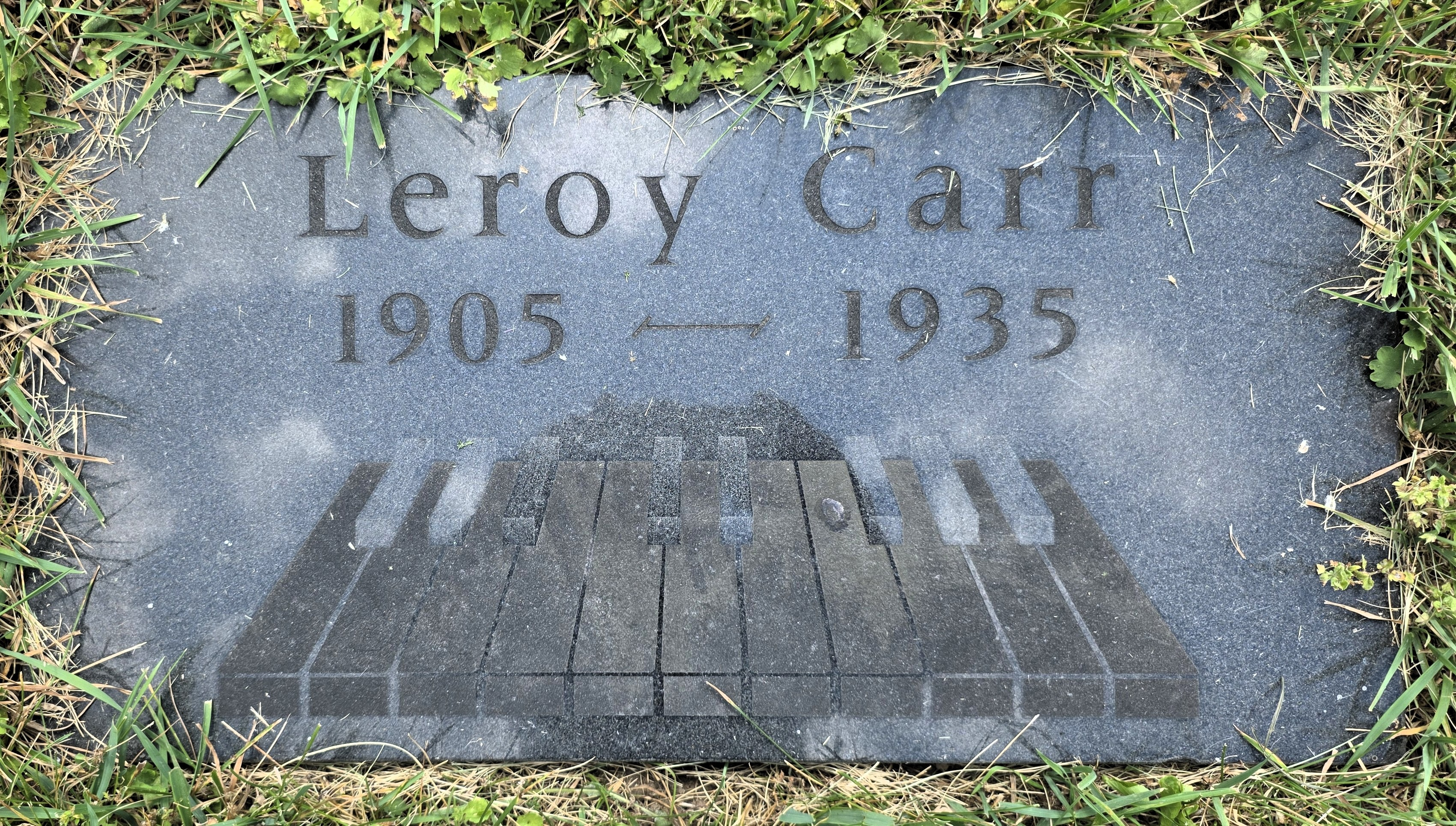
Gravesite of Leroy Carr, Floral Park Cemetery, Indianapolis, Indiana

Carr had a severe alcohol addiction. His last recording session was held in Chicago on February 25, 1935, in which the reportedly temperamental Blackwell stormed out before the session was finished and Carr recorded his final song, "Six Cold Feet in the Ground", as a solo.

Two months after the session, and a month after his 30th birthday, he died of nephritis and was buried in Floral Park Cemetery in Indianapolis.

== Legacy ==
Carr's vocal style moved blues singing toward an urban sophistication, influencing such singers as T-Bone Walker, Charles Brown, Amos Milburn, Jimmy Witherspoon, and Ray Charles, among others.

Count Basie and Jimmy Rushing recorded some of Carr's songs, and Basie's band shows the influence of Carr's piano style.

Carr's music has been recorded by a long list of artists, including Robert Johnson, Ray Charles, Big Bill Broonzy, Moon Mullican, Champion Jack Dupree, Lonnie Donegan, Long John Baldry, Memphis Slim, Barrelhouse Chuck and Eric Clapton.

Carr was inducted into the Blues Hall of Fame in 1982.

== Discography ==
- 1925-35 - Complete Recorded Works In Chronological Order, vols. 1–6 (Document Recs DOCD 5134–5139, 1992)
- 1934-1937 - Leroy Carr/Black Boy Shine_Unissued Test Pressings And Alternate Takes (Document Recs DOCD 5465, 1996)

The six CD above contains the complete recordings of Leroy Carr, at least under his name. All The other Recordings quoted here are eventually 99% the same material.

As an alternative the JSP is usually a good choice not only for acoustical reasons.

- 1928–1934 - L. C. & Scrapper Blackwell: The Early Recordings of an Innovative Blues Master, vol. 1, 1928–1934 (JSP, 2008)
- 1934–1941- When the Sun Goes Down 1934–1941 (4xCD) (JSP, 2011)
- Blues Before Sunrise (Columbia, 1962)
- Masters of the Blues, vol. 12 (Collector's Classics, 197
- Leroy Carr 1928–34 (K.O.B., 1971)
- Leroy Carr & Scrapper Blackwell: Naptown Blues 1929–1934 (Yazoo, 1973)
- Singin' the Blues 1937 (Biograph, 1973)
- Leroy Carr, vol. 2 (Collector's Classics, 197?)
- Don't Cry When I'm Gone (The Piano Blues, vol. 7) (Magpie, 1978)
- Leroy Carr 1928 (Matchbox, 1983)
- Leroy Carr & Scrapper Blackwell: Great Piano-Guitar Duets (1929–1935) (Old Tramp, 1987)
- Leroy Carr 1929–1934 (Document, 1988)
- Leroy Carr & Scrapper Blackwell 1929–1935 (Best of Blues, 1989)
- Leroy Carr & Scrapper Blackwell 1930–1958 (Document, 1989)
- Naptown Blues (Aldabra, 1992)
- Leroy Carr, vols. 1–2 (The Piano Blues series) (Magpie, 1992)
- Southbound Blues (Drive, 1994)
- Hurry Down Sunshine (Indigo, 1995)
- Naptown Blues (Orbis, 1996)
- Leroy Carr & Scrapper Blackwell: How Long Blues 1928–1935 (Blues Collection, 1997)
- American Blues Legend (Charly, 1998)
- Sloppy Drunk (Catfish, 1998)
- Prison Bound Blues (Snapper, 2001)
- P-Vine Presents 21 Blues Giants: Leroy Carr (P-Vine, 2001)
- The Essential Leroy Carr (Document, 2002)
- Whiskey Is My Habit, Women Is All I Crave (Columbia, 2004)
- How Long How Long Blues (Wolf, 2008)

== Bibliography ==
- Wald, Elijah (2004). Escaping the Delta: Robert Johnson and the Invention of the Blues. HarperCollins. ISBN 0-06-052423-5.
- Wald, Elijah (2010). The Blues. A Very Short Introduction (Kindle ed.). New York: Oxford University Press. ISBN 978-0-19-539893-9.
