= Tampa Red =

American blues and hokum musician (1903–1981)

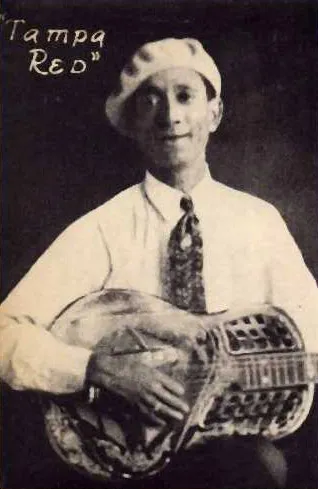
- Tampa Red in the early 1930s

Background information
- Also known as: Hudson Whittaker; The Guitar Wizard
- Born: Hudson Woodbridge; January 8, 1903; Smithville, Georgia, U.S.
- Died: March 19, 1981 (aged 78) Chicago, Illinois, U.S.
- Genres: Chicago blues; hokum
- Occupations: Musician, singer, songwriter
- Instruments: Slide guitar; kazoo
- Years active: 1920s–1960s
- Labels: Vocalion; Bluebird; RCA Victor

Hudson Whittaker (born Hudson Woodbridge; January 8, 1903 – March 19, 1981), better known by his stage name Tampa Red, was an American Chicago blues musician. His distinctive single-string slide guitar style, songwriting and bottleneck technique influenced other Chicago blues guitarists such as Big Bill Broonzy, Robert Nighthawk, Muddy Waters, and Elmore James.

In a career spanning over 30 years, he also recorded pop, R&B and hokum songs. His best-known recordings include "Anna Lou Blues", "Black Angel Blues", "Crying Won't Help You", "It Hurts Me Too", "Let Me Play with Your Poodle", and "Love Her with a Feeling".

== Biography ==
=== Early life ===
Tampa Red was born Hudson Woodbridge in Smithville, Georgia. The date of his birth is uncertain, with Tampa himself giving years varying from 1900 to 1908. The birth date given on his death certificate is January 8, 1904. His parents, John and Elizabeth Woodbridge, died when he was a child, and he moved to Tampa, Florida, where he was raised by his aunt and grandmother and adopted their surname, Whittaker. He emulated his older brother, Eddie, who played the guitar around the Tampa area, and he was especially inspired by an old street musician called Piccolo Pete, who first taught him to play blues licks on the guitar. Red also picked up some knowledge from early recordings of female blues singers like Ma Rainey, Bessie Smith, and Ida Cox. In an interview with Martin Williams, Red told Williams "That [1920] record of "Crazy Blues" by Mamie Smith, it was one of the first blues records ever made. I said to myself, 'I don't know any music, but I can play that.'"

=== Career ===
By 1925, having already perfected his slide technique, he had moved to Chicago, Illinois, and began his career as a street musician, adopting the name "Tampa Red", with reference to his childhood home and his light-colored skin. His big break came when he was hired to accompany Ma Rainey. While in Chicago, he met Thomas A. Dorsey, also known as Georgia Tom. Dorsey was an accomplished pianist, composer, and arranger who had performed and recorded with the leading female blues singers of the era, in particular Ma Rainey. Dorsey introduced Red to J. Mayo Williams, the frontman for Paramount Records in Chicago, who arranged a recording session for him in 1928.

His first recording "Through Train Blues" did not have as much success since it was the B-side to "How Long How Long" by Blind Lemon Jefferson, who was Paramount's biggest star at the time. It was Red's second recording, "It's Tight Like That", that caused a national sensation. The song reportedly came about when Mayo Williams heard them playing with a tune, borrowed from a Charley Jordan song, built around the then-popular catch phrase, "Tight Like That." Williams loved it and insisted they record it right away. Played in a bawdy and humorous style that became known as hokum, it ended up selling one million copies. Red would later recall people standing outside of record stores waiting to buy it. Since the song was composed by both Red and Dorsey, they shared around $4,000 in royalties from the song.

Tampa Red's early recordings were mostly collaborations with Dorsey. The two recorded almost 90 sides, sometimes as the Hokum Boys or, with Frankie Jaxon, as Tampa Red's Hokum Jug Band. In 1928 and 1929, besides making their own records, he and Georgia Tom appeared on recordings by Ma Rainey, Madilyn Davis, Lil Johnson, and female impersonator Frankie "Half Pint" Jaxon.

In 1928, Red became the first black musician to play a National steel-bodied resonator guitar, the loudest and showiest guitar available before amplification, acquiring one in the first year in which they were available. This allowed him to develop his trademark bottleneck style, playing single-string runs instead of block chords, which was a precursor of later blues and rock guitar soloing. The National guitar he used was a gold-plated tricone, which was found in Illinois in the 1990s by Randy Clemens, a music shop owner and guitarist, and later sold to the Experience Music Project in Seattle. Red was known as "The Man with the Gold Guitar", and into the 1930s he was billed as "The Guitar Wizard". In 1931, Red recorded "Depression Blues", including the topical lyrics, "If I could tell my troubles, it would give my poor heart ease, but Depression has got me, somebody help me please".

Red's partnership with Dorsey ended in 1932, but he remained much in demand as a session musician, working with John Lee "Sonny Boy" Williamson, Memphis Minnie, Big Maceo, and many others. He signed with Victor Records in 1934 and remained on their artist roster until 1953. He formed the Chicago Five, a group of session musicians who created what became known as the Bluebird sound, a precursor of the small-group style of later jump blues and rock and roll bands. Red was a friend and associate of Big Bill Broonzy and Big Maceo Merriweather. He achieved commercial success and some prosperity. His home became a centre for the blues community, providing rehearsal space, bookings, and lodgings for musicians who arrived in Chicago from the Mississippi Delta as the commercial potential of blues music grew and agricultural employment in the South diminished.

By the 1940s, Red was playing an electric guitar. In 1942, his "Let Me Play with Your Poodle" was a No. 4 hit on Billboard's new "Harlem Hit Parade", a forerunner of the R&B chart. His 1949 recording "When Things Go Wrong with You (It Hurts Me Too)", another R&B hit, was covered by Elmore James.

He was "rediscovered" in the blues revival of the late 1950s, like many other surviving early-recorded blues artists, such as Son House and Skip James. He made his last recordings in 1960.

=== Later life ===
Red's wife, Frances Whittaker, died on November 21, 1953. The loss was reportedly a great blow to him, and he became an alcoholic. When blues expert Jim O'Neal discovered him on Chicago's South Side in 1974, he was living with his female companion, 81-year-old Effie Tolbert. Red was reportedly in a much worse shape than in his earlier years, and his electric guitar rested under a bed while his National steel guitar had been stolen (it was recovered in a pawn shop in 1994, and eventually sold to the Experience Music Project in Seattle for $85,000). Tolbert died on December 10, 1974, and accounts of Red's past mental problems discouraged friends from taking him into their homes. By January 1975, he was at a state hospital in Chicago.

Red lived out his final years in Central Nursing Home, where he died from a heart attack while eating breakfast on the morning of March 19, 1981. According to a newspaper obituary published by Jim O'Neal, his funeral was held at Biggs & Biggs Funeral Home, and he was buried in Mount Glenwood Memory Garden in the Chicago suburb of Willow Springs.

== Discography ==
Red was one of the most prolific blues recording artists of his era. It has been estimated that he recorded 335 songs on 78-rpm records, 251 of which were recorded between 1928 and 1942, making him the blues artist with the most recordings during that period. Most of his singles were released before Billboard magazine began tracking blues (and other "race music") in October 1942, and accurate sales records are not available. However, he had four singles that placed in the R&B Top 10 between 1942 and 1951.

=== Selected singles ===
Red recorded alternate versions (usually designated "No. 2", "No. 3", etc.) of some of his early songs. Songs with alternate versions are marked with a plus sign. He recorded some singles with collaborators, credited as the Hokum Boys, Tampa Red's Hokum Jug Band, Papa Too Sweet, and other names.

Date	Title	Label & Cat. no.	Comments
1928	"It's Tight Like That"	Vocalion 1216^{+}	with Georgia Tom (Tom Dorsey) (piano)
1928	"How Long, How Long Blues"	Vocalion 1228^{+}	as Tampa Red's Hokum Jug Band
1929	"The Duck's Yas-Yas-Yas"	Vocalion 1277	with Dorsey
1929	"You've Got to Reap What You Sow"	Vocalion 1404	slide guitar instrumental
1929	"Corrine, Corrina"	Vocalion 1450^{+}	with Dorsey
1930	"The Dirty Dozen #2"	Vocalion 1538	
1931	"Things 'Bout Coming My Way"	Vocalion 1637^{+}	
1932	"You Can't Get That Stuff No More"	Vocalion 1706	with Dorsey
1934	"Sugar Mama Blues No. 1"	Vocalion 2720^{+}	
1934	"Black Angel Blues"	Vocalion 2753	
1934	"Things 'Bout Comin' My Way"	Vocalion 2774	instrumental remake of "Things 'Bout Coming My Way" with Dorsey
1934	"Denver Blues"	Vocalion 2774	instrumental
1934	"Mean Mistreater Blues"	Bluebird 5546	
1938	"Love with a Feeling"	Bluebird 7822	with Black Bob Hudson (piano) & unknown bass
1939	"Don't Forget It"	Bluebird 8327-B	
1940	"It Hurts Me Too"	Bluebird 8635	with Blind John Davis (piano) & unknown bass
1940	"Anna Lou Blues"	Bluebird 8654	with Davis & unknown bass
1940	"Don't You Lie to Me"	Bluebird 8654	with Davis & unknown bass
1942	"Let Me Play with Your Poodle"	Bluebird 0700	with Big Maceo Merriweather (piano) & Clifford Jones (drums), Billboard R&B chart No. 4
1945	"Detroit Blues"	Bluebird 0731	with combo (piano, bass, & drums), R&B No. 5
1946	"Crying Won't Help You"	RCA Victor 20-1988	with combo
1949	"When Things Go Wrong with You"	RCA Victor 22-0035	remake of "It Hurts Me Too", with combo, R&B No. 9
1950	"Love Her with a Feeling"	RCA Victor 22-0084	remake of "Love with a Feeling", with combo
1951	"Sweet Little Angel"	RCA Victor 22-0107	remake of "Black Angel Blues", with combo
1951	"Early in the Morning"	RCA Victor 22-0123	with combo
1951	"Pretty Baby Blues"	RCA Victor 22-0136	with combo, R&B No. 7

He also played as a sideman on recordings by Big Maceo Merriweather, John Lee "Sonny Boy" Williamson, Memphis Minnie, Ma Rainey, and Victoria Spivey.

=== Selected albums ===
Although he was a prolific singles artist, Red recorded only two albums, which were released late in his career. Various compilation albums have been released since his death by different record companies, often with significant overlap, but some compilations focus on certain aspects of his style or original record labels.

Date	Title	Label	Comments
1961	Don't Tampa with the Blues	Bluesville	recorded 1960
1961	Don't Jive Me	Bluesville	recorded 1960
1974	Bottleneck Guitar 1928–1937	Yazoo	
1991–93	Complete Recorded Works in Chronological Order, vols. 1–15	Document	recorded 1928–53
1993	Keep Jumping 1944–1952	Wolf	
1994	Tampa Red (1928–1942)	Story of the Blues	
1994	The Guitar Wizard	Columbia/Legacy	Okeh and Vocalion releases 1928–34
1994	It Hurts Me Too – The Essential Recordings	Indigo	various labels, 1928–42
1997	The Complete Bluebird Recordings 1934–1936	RCA	
1997	The Bluebird Recordings 1936–1938	RCA	
2001	The Essential	Classic Blues	recorded 1928–51
2002	Slide Guitar Classics	P-Vine	
