= List of nicknames of blues musicians =

The following list of nicknames of blues musicians complements the existing list of blues musicians by referring to their nicknames, stage names and pseudonyms, thereby helping to clarify possible confusion arising over artists with similar or the same nicknames. The list is arranged in alphabetical order by nickname rather than surname. For the possible origins of the nickname, see the corresponding article.

== A ==
- Alabama Slim
- Alto Reed
- Andy Boy
- Archibald

== B ==
- Trevor Babajack Steger
- Babe Stovall
- Baby Boy Warren
- "Baby Face" Leroy Foster
- Baby Franklin Seals
- Baby Gramps
- Baby Tate
- Kipori 'Baby Wolf' Woods
- Back Alley John
- Backwards Sam Firk
- Barbecue Bob
- Barkin' Bill Smith
- Barrelhouse Buck McFarland
- Barrelhouse Chuck
- Gary B.B. Coleman
- B. B. King
- Big Al Carson
- Big Bad Smitty
- Big Bill Broonzy
- Big Bill Morganfield
- Arthur "Big Boy" Crudup
- Arthur "Big Boy" Spires
- Big Boy Henry
- Big Chief Ellis
- Big Daddy Kinsey
- Big Daddy Wilson
- Big Dave McLean
- Willie "Big Eyes" Smith
- Big George Brock
- Big Jack Johnson
- Big Jay McNeely
- Big Joe Duskin
- Big Joe Maher
- Big Joe Turner
- Big Joe Williams
- Big John Greer
- Big John Wrencher
- Big Maceo Merriweather
- Big Mama Thornton
- Big Maybelle
- Ernest "Big" Crawford
- Robert "Big Mojo" Elem
- Johnny "Big Moose" Walker
- Big Walter Horton
- Golden "Big" Wheeler
- Otis "Big Smokey" Smothers
- Billy Boy Arnold
- Billy Rich
- Gene "Birdlegg" Pittman
- Biscuit Miller
- Bishop Dready Manning
- Black Ace
- Black Boy Shine
- Black Ivory King
- Black Joe Lewis
- Blind Blake
- Blind Blues Darby
- Blind Boy Fuller
- Blind Boy Grunt (Bob Dylan)
- Jerron "Blind Boy" Paxton
- Blind Connie Williams
- Blind Gary Davis (Reverend Gary Davis)
- Blind James Campbell
- Blind Joe Hill
- Blind Joe Reynolds
- Blind John Davis
- Blind Joe Taggart
- Blind Lemon Jefferson
- Blind Leroy Garnett
- Blind Mississippi Morris
- Blind Roosevelt Graves
- Blind Simmie Dooley
- Blind Willie Johnson
- Blind Willie McTell
- Blind Willie Walker
- Bobby "Blue" Bland
- Andrew "Blueblood" McMahon
- Blue Lu Barker
- Kenny "Blues Boss" Wayne
- Artie "Blues Boy" White
- Blues Boy Willie
- Bob Log III
- Bobby Lounge
- Bobo Jenkins
- Bo Carter
- Bo Diddley
- Bonnie Lee
- Booba Barnes
- Boo Boo Davis
- James "Boogaloo" Bolden
- Boo Hanks
- James "Boodle It" Wiggins
- Jonathon "Boogie" Long
- Booker T. Laury
- Bo Weavil Jackson
- Bogus Ben Covington
- Boogie Bill Webb
- Boogie Woogie Red
- Boston Blackie
- Boz Scaggs
- Breezy Rodio
- Brother Dege
- Brownie McGhee
- Buckethead
- Buddy Ace
- Buddy Guy
- Buddy Boy Hawkins
- Buddy Johnson
- Buddy Moss
- Oscar "Buddy" Woods
- Bugs Henderson
- Bukka White
- Bull City Red
- Bull Moose Jackson
- Bumble Bee Slim
- Buster Benton
- Buster Pickens

== C ==
- Al "Cake" Wichard
- Captain Beefheart
- Carolina Slim
- Casey Bill Weldon
- Cash McCall
- Catfish Hodge
- Catfish Keith
- Cat Iron
- Cedar Creek Sheik
- Champion Jack Dupree
- Chicago Bob Nelson
- Chico Banks
- Chris Thomas King
- Bertha "Chippie" Hill
- Eddie "Cleanhead" Vinson
- Eddy Clearwater
- Coco Montoya
- Coco Robicheaux
- Cool John Ferguson
- Coot Grant
- Cootie Stark
- Cootie Williams
- Corky Siegel
- Cornbread Harris
- Country Jim Bledsoe
- Cousin Joe
- Cow Cow Davenport
- Cripple Clarence Lofton
- Crown Prince Waterford
- Curley Bridges
- Curley Weaver

== D ==
- Daddy Stovepipe
- Dakota Dave Hull
- Danielle Nicole
- Deacon John Moore
- Del Rey
- Delta Blind Billy
- Detroit Gary Wiggins
- Detroit Junior
- Willy DeVille
- Diamond Teeth Mary
- Doc Pomus
- Doc Terry
- Doc Watson
- Doctor Clayton
- Doctor Ross
- Johnny Dollar
- Dr. Hepcat
- Driftin' Slim
- Drive 'Em Down (pianist Willie Hall)
- Johnny Drummer
- Duck Baker
- Jimmy "Duck" Holmes
- Duke Henderson
- Duke Robillard
- Duke Tumatoe
- Duster Bennett
- Dusty Brown
- Dutch Mason

== E ==
- Earring George Mayweather
- Elkie Brooks
- Ezra Charles

== F ==
- Fantastic Negrito
- Dave "Fat Man" Williams
- Fats Domino
- Fiddlin' Joe Martin
- Fillmore Slim
- Greg "Fingers" Taylor
- Flash Terry
- Flip Phillips
- Forest City Joe
- Furry Lewis
- Calvin "Fuzz" Jones

== G ==
- Clarence "Gatemouth" Brown
- Gatemouth Moore
- Willis "Gator" Jackson
- Luther "Georgia Boy" Johnson
- Geeshie Wiley
- Georgia Tom (Thomas A. Dorsey)
- Gloria Whitney
- Good Rockin' Charles
- Eddie "Guitar" Burns
- Guitar Crusher
- Guitar Gable
- Guitar Gabriel
- Joe "Guitar" Hughes
- Luther "Guitar Junior" Johnson
- Matt "Guitar" Murphy
- Guitar Nubbit
- Guitar Pete Franklin
- Guitar Shorty
- Guitar Slim
- Guitar Slim Jr.
- Johnny "Guitar" Watson

== H ==
- Richard "Hacksaw" Harney
- Hambone Willie Newbern
- Terry "Harmonica" Bean
- Harmonica Fats
- Harmonica Frank
- Harmonica Hinds
- Harmonica Shah
- Harmonica Slim
- George "Harmonica" Smith
- Harpdog Brown
- H-Bomb Ferguson
- Joe Hill Louis
- Hip Linkchain
- Hollywood Fats
- Homesick James
- David "Honeyboy" Edwards
- Hop Wilson
- Hound Dog Taylor
- Luther "Houserocker" Johnson
- Howlin' Wolf
- Hozier
- Roger "Hurricane" Wilson

== I ==
- Ironing Board Sam
- Iron Mike Norton
- Ivory Joe Hunter

== J ==
- Jabo Starks
- Jandek
- Jawbone
- Jaybird Coleman
- Jazbo Brown
- Jazz Gillum
- Jelly Roll Morton
- John Littlejohn
- Johnny A.
- Johnny Iguana
- Juke Boy Bonner
- John "Juke" Logan
- Armand "Jump" Jackson
- Andrew "Jr. Boy" Jones
- Junior Kimbrough
- Junior Parker
- Junior Watson
- Junior Wells

== K ==
- Kal David
- Kansas City Red
- Kansas Joe McCoy
- Keb' Mo'
- Kid Bailey
- Kid Congo Powers
- Kid Memphis
- Kid Prince Moore
- Kid Ramos
- King Biscuit Boy
- King Cotton
- King Ernest Baker
- Christone "Kingfish" Ingram
- King Solomon Hill, a nickname and pseudonym
- Koko Taylor
- Kokomo Arnold

== L ==
- Lady Bianca
- Laughing Charley
- Lazer Lloyd
- Lazy Bill Lucas
- Lazy Lester
- Lead Belly
- Lefty Bates
- Lefty Dizz
- Leigh Blond
- Leon Redbone
- Lightnin' Hopkins
- Lightnin' Slim
- Lightnin' Wells
- Lil' Buck Sinegal
- Lil' Dave Thompson
- Lil' Ed Williams
- Melvin "Lil' Son" Jackson
- Little Arthur Duncan
- Little Axe
- Little Brother Montgomery
- Little Buddy Doyle
- Edward "Little Buster" Forehand
- Little Freddie King
- Little Hatch
- Little Hat Jones
- Little Jimmy King
- Little Joe Blue
- Little Joe McLerran
- Little Johnny Jones
- Little Johnny Taylor
- Little Mack Simmons
- Little Milton
- Little Miss Cornshucks
- Little Pink Anderson
- Little Sammy Davis
- Little Smokey Smothers
- Little Sonny
- Little Sonny Jones
- Little Sun Glover
- Little Victor
- Little Walter
- Little Willie Farmer
- Little Willie Littlefield
- Little Willy Foster
- Lonesome Sundown
- Luke "Long Gone" Miles
- Long John Hunter
- Willie "Long Time" Smith
- Howard "Louie Bluie" Armstrong
- Louisiana Red
- Lovie Austin
- Lovie Lee
- Lucky Millinder
- Lucky Peterson

== M ==
- Lonnie Mack
- Peter "Madcat" Ruth
- Ma Rainey
- Magic Sam
- Magic Slim
- Mance Lipscomb
- Johnny "Man" Young
- Maxwell Street Jimmy Davis
- Memphis Minnie
- Memphis Slim
- Memphis Willie B.
- Mercy Baby
- The Mighty Hannibal
- Mighty Joe Young
- Mighty Mo Rodgers
- Mighty Sam McClain
- Miss Frankie
- Mississippi Fred McDowell
- Mississippi Joe Callicott
- Mississippi John Hurt
- Mississippi Matilda
- The Mississippi Moaner
- George "Mojo" Buford
- Moody Jones
- Monster Mike Welch
- Montana Taylor
- Mr. Blues (Wynonie Harris)
- Mr. Bo
- Mr. Sipp
- Michael "Mudcat" Ward
- Mud Morganfield
- Muddy Waters

== N ==
- Nappy Brown
- New Orleans Willie Jackson
- Robert Nighthawk
- Johnny Nitro

== O ==
- Eddie "One String" Jones
- One String Sam
- Otis Grand

== P ==
- Papa Charlie Jackson
- Papa Charlie McCoy
- Papa Lightfoot
- Papa Mali
- Peach
- Peetie Wheatstraw (also released music under the names "The Devil's Son-in-Law" and "The High Sheriff from Hell")
- Pee Wee Crayton
- Peg Leg Howell
- Peg Leg Sam
- Peppermint Harris
- Piano "C" Red
- Vann "Piano Man" Walls
- Piano Red
- Huey "Piano" Smith
- Ron "Pigpen" McKernan
- Pinetop Burks
- Pinetop Perkins
- Pinetop Smith
- Pinetop Sparks
- Piney Brown
- Pink Anderson
- Polka Dot Slim
- Pops Staples
- Popa Chubby
- Jimmy "Preacher" Ellis
- Prince Albert Hunt
- Princess White
- Professor Eddie Lusk
- Professor Longhair

== R ==
- Rabbit Brown
- Rag'n'Bone Man
- Ramblin' Thomas
- Eric "Red Mouth" Gebhardt
- Red Nelson
- Red Prysock
- Reverend Billy C. Wirtz
- Reverend Freakchild
- Reverend Gary Davis
- Reverend Peyton
- Rhythm Willie
- Rockie Charles
- Rockin' Dave Allen
- Rockin' Sidney
- Rocky Hill
- Rubberlegs Williams
- Henry "Rufe" Johnson
- Rusty Zinn

== S ==
- Scrapper Blackwell
- Seasick Steve
- Shakey Jake Harris
- Shorty Medlocke
- Lee "Shot" Williams
- Sippie Wallace
- Sista Monica Parker
- Sister Rosetta Tharpe
- Skeeter Brandon
- Skip James
- Sleepy John Estes
- Slim Harpo
- Eric "Slowhand" Clapton
- Smokey Hogg
- Smokey Johnson
- Smokey Wilson
- Smokin' Joe Bonamassa
- Smokin' Joe Kubek
- Smoky Babe
- Dave "Snaker" Ray
- Snooks Eaglin
- Snooky Pryor
- Soko Richardson
- Son Bonds
- Son House
- Son Lewis
- Son Seals
- Henry "Son" Sims
- Sonny Boy Nelson
- Sonny Rhodes
- Sonny Rodgers
- Sonny Terry
- Sonny Boy Williamson I
- Sonny Boy Williamson II
- Southside Johnny
- Speckled Red
- Charlie "Specks" McFadden
- Spider John Koerner
- Frank "Springback" James
- Stick McGhee
- Sticks Herman
- St. Louis Jimmy Oden
- Stone Mecca
- Stomp Gordon
- Stovepipe No. 1
- Studebaker John
- James "Stump" Johnson
- Sugar Blue
- Don "Sugarcane" Harris
- Sugar Pie DeSanto
- Sugar Ray Norcia
- Sugaray Rayford
- Sunnyland Slim
- Super Chikan
- Sweet Pea Atkinson

== T ==
- T-Bone Walker
- T-Model Ford
- Tab Smith
- Tabby Thomas
- Tail Dragger Jones
- Taj Mahal
- Tampa Red
- Tarheel Slim
- Teenie Hodges
- Teeny Tucker
- Tee Tot
- Alger "Texas" Alexander
- Texas Johnny Brown
- Clarence Tex Walker
- James "Thunderbird" Davis
- Tiny Bradshaw
- Tiny Grimes
- Tiny Legs Tim
- Tiny Topsy
- Tommy Tucker
- Tommy Z
- Too Tight Henry
- Tuts Washington
- Tutu Jones
- T.V. Slim

== U ==
- U.P. Wilson

== W ==
- Walkin' Cane Mark
- Washboard Doc
- Washboard Sam
- Washboard Willie
- Watermelon Slim
- Whistlin' Alex Moore
- Moses "Whispering" Smith
- George "Wild Child" Butler
- Wild Jimmy Spruill
- Paul "Wine" Jones
- Walter "Wolfman" Washington
- Carolyn Wonderland

== Y ==
- Yank Rachell
- Johnny "Yard Dog" Jones
- Alvin Youngblood Hart

== Z ==
- Zoot Horn Rollo
- Zuzu Bollin

== No. (s) ==
- Willie "61" Blackwell
- 8 Ball Aitken

== See also ==
- Lists of nicknames – nickname list articles on Wikipedia
- List of stage names
- List of nicknames of jazz musicians
