= List of country blues musicians =

The following is a list of country blues musicians.

== A ==
- Alger "Texas" Alexander (September 12, 1900, Jewett, Texas – April 16, 1954). Singer, a forebear of Texas blues. He did not play a musical instrument but was backed by such artists as Lonnie Johnson and Lightnin' Hopkins. He also sang with King Oliver. He recorded for Okeh Records and Freedom Records, among others.
- Pink Anderson (February 12, 1900, Spartanburg, South Carolina – October 12, 1974). Early country blues guitarist and singer who played Piedmont blues. Many of his recordings have been released by Prestige Records.
- Howard "Louie Bluie" Armstrong (March 4, 1909 – July 30, 2003). Singer who played fiddle, mandolin, and guitar. He also performed vaudeville blues for the Theatre Owners Booking Association.

== B ==
- Backwards Sam Firk (September 18, 1943 – October 11, 2007). Country blues singer, fingerstyle guitarist, songwriter, and record collector
- DeFord Bailey (December 14, 1899 – July 2, 1982). Early country blues harmonica player from Tennessee. First performer on the Grand Ole Opry and known as 'the Harmonica Wizard', Bailey was an Opry stalwart for 14 years.
- Etta Baker (March 31, 1913, Caldwell County, North Carolina – September 23, 2006). Guitarist, banjo player and singer who performed Piedmont blues. In the 1990s she released two solo albums, one for Rounder Records. In 2004 Music Maker Records released some recordings she made with Taj Mahal in 1956 and 1998.
- Barbecue Bob (September 11, 1902 – October 21, 1931). Born Robert Hicks, an acoustic guitar performer of early country blues.
- John Henry Barbee (November 14, 1905, Henning, Tennessee – November 3, 1964). Guitarist and singer, an exponent of early country blues and Delta blues. He performed early in his career with Sunnyland Slim.
- Robert Belfour (September 11, 1940, Holly Springs, Mississippi – February 24, 2015). Hill country blues guitarist and singer and collaborator with Mose Vinson. He started recording late in his career, beginning in the 1990s. His last album, Pushin' My Luck, was released by Fat Possum Records.
- Ed Bell (May 1905, Fort Deposit, Alabama – 1960, 1965 or 1966). Released recordings under his own name and as Sluefoot Joe and Barefoot Bill from Alabama.
- Scrapper Blackwell (February 21, 1903, Syracuse, South Carolina – October 27, 1962). Born Francis Hillman Blackwell, he performed acoustic Piedmont blues and was an early exponent of Chicago blues. He worked closely with the pianist Leroy Carr and backed the singer Black Bottom McPhail. Document Records issued most of his work in three volumes.
- Blind Blake (1896, Jacksonville, Florida – December 1, 1934). Guitarist and singer, playing early ragtime, Piedmont blues, country blues, Delta blues and Chicago blues. He recorded frequently for Paramount Records.
- Lucille Bogan (April 1, 1897, Amory, Mississippi – August 10, 1948). Classic female blues singer who performed early country blues. Many of her songs were sexually suggestive, and thus she may be considered a dirty blues musician. Document Records issued her complete recordings in a series of releases.
- Ted Bogan (May 10, 1909 – January 29, 1990). Country blues guitarist, singer-songwriter. He is best known for his work with Howard Armstrong and Carl Martin, and had a career that spanned over 50 years. His finger-picking guitar work was much admired and Bogan played in a variety of string bands most of his lifetime. These included Martin, Bogan & Armstrong or Martin, Bogan & the Armstrongs.
- Bogus Ben Covington (possibly April 19, 1890 – 1935). Singer and mandolin-banjo player.
- Son Bonds (March 16, 1909, Brownsville, Tennessee – August 31, 1947). An associate of Sleepy John Estes, with a similar guitar-playing style, and Hammie Nixon. The music of one of his songs, "Back and Side Blues", became a blues standard and was used in "Good Morning, School Girl".
- R.L. Boyce (August 15, 1955 – November 9, 2023), born, lived and died in Como, Mississippi, and was a singer, songwriter and guitarist. His album, Roll and Tumble, was nominated a 2018 Grammy Award in the Best Traditional Blues Album category.
- Ishmon Bracey (January 9, 1899 or 1901 – February 12, 1970), sometimes credited as Ishman Bracey, was an American Delta blues singer-guitarist.
- Big Bill Broonzy (June 26, 1893 or 1898, Scott County, Mississippi – August 14 or 15, 1958). Acoustic country blues musician who performed Chicago blues, singing and playing guitar and mandolin. He recorded over 350 compositions over his career.
- Bob Brozman (March 8, 1954, New York City – April 23, 2013). Slide guitarist who performed in various blues idioms, including electric blues and country blues, and some traditional folk music. He recorded at least fifteen albums for Kicking Mule and other labels and worked with various musicians performing blues and other styles of music.
- Bumble Bee Slim (May 7, 1905 – June 8, 1968). Piedmont blues singer and guitarist.
- R.L. Burnside (November 23, 1926 – September 1, 2005). Mississippi hill country blues singer and guitarist.
- Butterbeans and Susie. Singing and dancing comedy duo of Jodie Edwards (July 19, 1895 – October 28, 1967) and Susie Edwards (1896 – December 5, 1963), active mostly in the 1920s and 1930s.

== C ==
- Mississippi Joe Callicott (October 10, 1899 – May 1969). American Delta blues singer and guitarist.
- Cannon's Jug Stompers. Memphis jug band led by Gus Cannon, active in the 1920s and 1930s.
- Bo Carter (March 21, 1893, Bolton, Mississippi – September 21, 1964). One of the first dirty blues musicians, with songs like "Banana in Your Fruit Basket". A singer and multi-instrumentalist, he played guitar, banjo, string bass, and clarinet and performed mostly early Delta blues. Document Records released a series of issues of his complete recordings.
- John Cephas (September 4, 1930, Washington, D.C. – March 4, 2009). Raised in Bowling Green, Virginia, he was a singer, guitarist, and harmonica player performing in the Piedmont blues style. He recorded several albums, notably for Alligator Records.
- Jaybird Coleman (May 20, 1896, Gainesville, Alabama – January 28, 1950). Harmonica player, guitarist and singer who performed early Piedmont blues and harmonica blues. He was active mostly in the 1930s. His music career declined, and he became a street performer in Alabama. Document Records has issued a compilation of all of his recordings.
- Floyd Council (September 2, 1911 – May 9, 1976). Singer, guitarist and mandolinist of Piedmont blues.
- Ida Cox (February 26, 1896 – November 10, 1967). Singer and vaudeville performer, best known for her blues performances and recordings.
- James Crutchfield (May 25, 1912 – December 7, 2001). St. Louis barrelhouse blues singer and piano player.

== D ==
- Blind Blues Darby (March 2, 1906 – December 1975). St. Louis-based blues singer and guitar player.
- Reverend Gary Davis (April 30, 1896 – May 5, 1972). Blues and gospel blues singer and guitarist.
- Little Buddy Doyle (born March 20, 1911; died c. 1960). American Memphis blues and country blues guitarist, singer and songwriter.

== E ==
- Sleepy John Estes (January 25, 1899 or 1900 – June 5, 1977). Guitarist, singer-songwriter.

== F ==
- Blind Boy Fuller (July 10, 1904 or 1907 – February 13, 1941). Guitarist and singer.
- Jesse Fuller (March 12, 1896 – January 29, 1976). Multi-instrumentalist, best known for his song "San Francisco Bay Blues".

== G ==
- Terry Garland (June 3, 1953 – September 19, 2021). Guitarist, singer and songwriter.
- Jazz Gillum (September 11, 1904 – March 29, 1966). Harmonica player.
- Coot Grant (June 17, 1893 – December 26, 1970). Classic female blues, country blues, and vaudeville singer and songwriter.

== H ==
- William Harris (dates unknown). American guitarist, singer-songwriter. He recorded sixteen songs between 1927 and 1928, of which fourteen were released on record. AllMusic noted that Harris was "a fine second-level blues and folksong performer". His best known works are "Kansas City Blues," "Early Mornin' Blues," and "Hot Time Blues."
- Richard "Hacksaw" Harney (July 16, 1902, Money, Mississippi – December 25, 1973, Jackson, Mississippi). Guitarist and pianist.
- Hattie Hart (dates unknown) Memphis blues singer-songwriter.
- Buddy Boy Hawkins (dates unknown). Guitarist, singer-songwriter. He recorded only 12 songs between 1927 and 1929, but Paul Oliver opined that "Hawkins was a major figure in black country music".
- Jessie Mae Hemphill (October 18, 1923 – July 22, 2006). Electric guitarist, songwriter, and singer of North Mississippi hill country blues.
- Lightnin' Hopkins (March 15, 1912, Centerville, Texas – January 30, 1982). Acoustic and electric guitarist, a major exponent of Texas blues and country blues and one of the best-known blues musicians.
- Son House (March 21, 1902 – October 19, 1988). Delta blues guitarist and singer.
- Peg Leg Howell (March 5, 1888, Eatonton, Georgia – August 11, 1966). Guitarist and singer who performed acoustic country blues in the Piedmont blues style.
- Mississippi John Hurt (July 3, 1893, or March 8, 1892 – November 2, 1966). Guitarist and singer.

== J ==
- Melvin "Lil' Son" Jackson (August 16, 1915, Tyler, Texas – May 30, 1976). Acoustic and electric guitarist and singer of Texas blues.
- Papa Charlie Jackson (November 10, 1887 – May 7, 1938). Singer, guitarist, and banjo guitar and ukulele player.
- Skip James (June 9, 1902 – October 3, 1969). The most famous member of the Bentonia School (or style of blues) singer, guitarist, pianist and songwriter. Known for his use of Open D Minor tunings, and his falsetto singing voice.
- Blind Lemon Jefferson (September 24, 1893 – December 19, 1929). Blues and gospel singer, guitarist, and songwriter, one of the most popular blues singers of the 1920s, who has been called the "Father of the Texas Blues".
- Herman E. Johnson (August 18, 1909 – February 2, 1975). Blues singer and guitarist.
- Lonnie Johnson (February 8, 1899 [disputed, possibly 1889 or 1894] – June 16, 1970). Blues and jazz singer, guitarist, violinist and songwriter, a pioneer of jazz guitar and jazz violin, recognized as the first to play an electrically amplified violin.
- Robert Johnson (May 8, 1911 – August 16, 1938). Delta blues singer, songwriter, guitarist, and harmonica player. Despite his short life and limited recordings, he is perhaps the best known blues musician of the pre-war era, sometimes called the "King of the Delta Blues".
- Blind Willie Johnson (January 22, 1897 – September 18, 1945) Born near Brenham, Texas was first and foremost a gospel blues guitarist and singer, an early innovator of the slide guitar (using a pocketknife). Johnson mixed his evangelical lyrics with early Texas blues, and is remembered for the 30 songs he recorded for Columbia Records in 1927–30.
- Richard Johnston. Richard Wayne Johnston is an American country blues musician.
- Tutu Jones (born September 9, 1966, Dallas, Texas). Electric blues and soul blues guitarist, singer and songwriter.
- Luke Jordan (January 28, 1892, Bluefield, West Virginia – June 25, 1952). Guitarist performing Piedmont blues and East Coast blues. He spent most of his career in Lynchburg, Virginia.

== K ==
- Junior Kimbrough. (July 28, 1930, Hudsonville, Mississippi – January 17, 1998). Born David Kimbrough, he was an acoustic and electric guitarist and singer of hill country blues and juke joint blues. He recorded several albums for Fat Possum Records.
- Lottie Kimbrough (1893 or 1900 – unknown). Singer. She was a large woman and was nicknamed "The Kansas City Butterball".

== L ==
- Lead Belly (January 23, 1888 – December 6, 1949). Singer and multi-instrumentalist who played folk music and blues, notable for his strong vocals, virtuosity on the twelve-string guitar, and the folk standards he introduced.
- John Lee (May 24, 1915 – October 11, 1977). Guitarist, pianist, singer-songwriter. He recorded two singles released by Federal in 1952 and, despite a period of 13 years away from music, Lee was 'rediscovered' and recorded an album released on Rounder in 1974.
- Furry Lewis (March 6, 1893 or 1899 – September 14, 1981). Guitarist, singer-songwriter.
- Noah Lewis (September 3, 1891, Henning, Tennessee – February 7, 1961). Jug band and country blues harmonica player, composer of "Minglewood Blues", which he recorded as a member of Cannon's Jug Stompers.
- Charley Lincoln (March 11, 1900, Lithonia, Georgia – September 28, 1963). Acoustic country and Piedmont blues guitarist and singer. He was the brother of Barbecue Bob, with whom he performed from the 1920s until Bob's death in 1931. He made several recordings, some for Columbia Records.
- Mance Lipscomb (April 9, 1895, Navasota, Texas – January 30, 1976). Guitarist and singer, he performed a repertory based on blues, ragtime, Tin Pan Alley and folk music. He recorded for Arhoolie Records and Reprise Records.
- Robert Lockwood, Jr. (March 27, 1915 – November 21, 2006). Delta blues guitarist.
- John Long (born 1950). American fingerstyle guitarist, harmonica player and songwriter. He performs in a pre-war acoustic blues style, although his material is contemporary and mainly composed by Long and his elder brother. He has released three albums to date.

== M ==
- Ida May Mack (unknown). Mack recorded eight songs in August 1928, six of which were issued by Victor at that time.
- Eddie Mapp (c. 1910 – November 14, 1931). Harmonica player.
- Carl Martin (April 1 or 15, 1906 – May 10, 1979). Piedmont blues multi-instrumentalist and singer.
- Papa Charlie McCoy (May 26, 1909 – July 26, 1950). Delta blues guitarist, mandolinist and songwriter.
- Charlie "Specks" McFadden (April 24, 1895 – November 15, 1966). Country blues singer-songwriter. His recordings spanned the years from 1929 to 1937.
- Mississippi Fred McDowell (January 12, 1904 – July 3, 1972). Hill country blues singer and guitar player.
- Brownie McGhee (November 30, 1915 – February 16, 1996). Folk music and Piedmont blues singer and guitarist, best known for his collaboration with the harmonica player Sonny Terry.
- Tommy McClennan (January 4, 1905 – May 9, 1961). American Delta blues singer and guitarist.
- Blind Willie McTell (May 5, 1898 – August 19, 1959). Piedmont blues and ragtime singer and guitarist.
- Memphis Jug Band. Founded about 1926 in Memphis and recorded there from 1927 to 1934.
- Memphis Minnie (June 3, 1897 – August 6, 1973). Guitarist, singer-songwriter whose recording career lasted from the 1920s to the 1950s.
- The Mississippi Moaner (c. 1912 – unknown) Singer and guitarist who recorded four songs in October 1935.
- Mississippi Sheiks. Popular and influential guitar and fiddle group of the 1930s, notable mostly for playing country blues, but adept at many styles of popular music of the time.

== N ==
- Sonny Boy Nelson (December 23, 1908 – November 4, 1998). Multi-instrumentalist (banjo, guitar, harmonica, horn, mandolin and violin).
- Robert Nighthawk (November 30, 1909 – November 5, 1967). He played with Big Joe Williams and Sonny Boy Williamson I.
- Hammie Nixon (January 22, 1908, Brownsville, Tennessee – August 17, 1984). Born Hammie Nickerson, he began his music career with jug bands in the 1920s. He is best known as a country blues harmonica player. He also played the kazoo, guitar and jug. He played with the guitarist Sleepy John Estes for half a century, first recording with Estes in 1929 for Victor Records. He also recorded with Little Buddy Doyle, Lee Green, Clayton T. Driver, Charlie Pickett and Son Bonds.

== P ==
- Charley Patton (April 1891 [uncertain, possibly 1881, 1885, or 1887] – April 28, 1934). Delta blues guitarist and singer. Considered one of the originators of the delta blues style itself.
- Peg Leg Sam (December 18, 1911 – October 27, 1977). Harmonica player and singer.
- Robert Petway (October 18, 1907 – May 30, 1978). Delta blues guitarist and singer. He composed and performed "Catfish Blues".
- Reverend Peyton (born April 12, 1981). Guitarist and singer.
- Dan Pickett (August 31, 1907 – August 16, 1967), Born as James Founty, was an American Piedmont blues and country blues singer, guitarist and songwriter. He only recorded fourteen tracks for Gotham Records in 1949, several of which were issued in more recent times. AllMusic noted that "Pickett had a distinctive rhythmic style and unique phrasing that makes his records compelling decades after his release".
- Polka Dot Slim (December 9, 1926 – June 22, 1981). Singer and harmonica player.

== Q ==
- Henry Qualls (July 8, 1934 – December 7, 2003). American Texas and country blues guitarist and singer. He found success late in his life after being "discovered" in 1993 by the Dallas Blues Society. He released his only album in 1994 but toured globally playing at a number of festivals.

== R ==
- Yank Rachell (March 16, 1910 – April 9, 1997). Mandolinist, guitarist and singer.
- Walter Roland (December 20, 1902, or December 4, 1903 – October 12, 1972). Blues, boogie-woogie and jazz pianist, guitarist and singer.
- Doctor Ross (October 21, 1925, Tunica, Mississippi – May 28, 1993). Born Charles Isaiah Ross, he was a harmonica player, guitarist and singer of country blues, Delta blues and juke joint blues. He recorded several albums from the 1960s to the 1990s for various labels, including Fortune Records and JSP Records.
- Carl Rutherford (April 25, 1929 – January 28, 2006). American Piedmont blues, country blues, and Appalachian music guitarist, singer and songwriter.

== S ==
- Dan Sane (September 22, 1896 [uncertain] – February 18, 1956). Memphis blues and country blues guitarist and songwriter.
- Irene Scruggs (December 7, 1901 – July 20, 1981). Piedmont blues and country blues singer.
- Alec Seward (March 16, 1902 – May 11, 1972). Piedmont blues and country blues singer, guitarist and songwriter.
- J.D. Short (February 26, 1902 – October 21, 1962). Delta blues singer, guitarist and harmonica player.
- Frankie Lee Sims (April 30, 1917 – May 10, 1970). Singer-songwriter and electric blues guitarist.
- Laura Smith ((March 1882 – February 1932). Classic female blues and country blues singer.
- Victoria Spivey (October 15, 1906 – October 3, 1976). Singer and songwriter.
- Frank Stokes (January 1, 1888 – September 12, 1955). Guitarist, singer and songwriter, considered by some to be the father of the Memphis blues guitar style.

== T ==
- Tampa Red (January 8, 1903 – March 19, 1981). Guitarist and songwriter.
- Baby Tate (January 28, 1916 – August 17, 1972). Piedmont blues guitarist and singer.
- Sonny Terry (October 24, 1911 – March 11, 1986). Piedmont blues and folk harmonica player known for his energetic blues style.
- Henry Thomas (1874 – c. 1930). Early Texas bluesman who influenced performers ranging from Bob Dylan and Taj Mahal to The Grateful Dead and Canned Heat.
- Ramblin' Thomas (c. 1902 – c. 1945). Singer, guitarist and songwriter.
- Bessie Tucker (c. 1906 – January 6, 1933). Classic female blues, country blues, and Texas blues singer and songwriter. Little is known of her life outside the music industry. She is known to have recorded just twenty-four tracks, seven of which were alternate takes. Her songs include "Penitentiary" and "Fryin' Pan Skillet Blues".

== W ==
- Sippie Wallace (November 1, 1898 – November 1, 1986). Singer-songwriter, pianist and organist.
- Curley Weaver (March 25, 1906 – September 20, 1962). Guitarist and singer.
- Boogie Bill Webb (March 24, 1924 – August 22, 1990). Louisiana blues and R&B guitarist, singer-songwriter.
- Peetie Wheatstraw (December 21, 1902 – December 21, 1941). St. Louis blues pianist, guitarist and singer.
- Bukka White (November 12, 1909 – February 26, 1977). Delta blues guitarist and singer.
- Big Joe Williams (October 16, 1903 – December 17, 1982). Delta blues guitarist, singer-songwriter.
- Sonny Boy Williamson I (John Lee Curtis Williamson, March 30, 1914 – June 1, 1948). Harmonica player, singer-songwriter.
- Sonny Boy Williamson II (Alex or Aleck Ford, later known as Aleck "Rice" Miller, December 5, 1912 [uncertain] – May 24, 1965). Harmonica player, singer-songwriter.
- Jontavious Willis (born 1996). Singer, guitarist, songwriter, and multi-instrumentalist.
- Ralph Willis (1910 – June 11, 1957). Piedmont blues and country blues singer, guitarist and songwriter.
- Wesley Wilson (October 1, 1893 – October 10, 1958). Blues and jazz singer-songwriter.
- Johnny Winter (February 23, 1944 – July 16, 2014). Singer, guitarist, songwriter and harmonica player.
