= Merline Johnson =

American blues singer in the 1930s and 1940s

Merline Johnson (born c. 1912 or 1918, date of death unknown) was an American blues singer in the 1930s and 1940s, billed as The Yas Yas Girl. "Yas yas" was a euphemism for buttocks in hokum blues songs such as Blind Boy Fuller's "Get Yer Yas Yas Out" and James "Stump" Johnson's "The Duck's Yas-Yas-Yas".

Little is known of her life. It is generally believed that she was born in Mississippi, though the researchers Bob Eagle and Eric LeBlanc suggest she may have been born Merline Baker in Callaway County, Missouri. She was the aunt of singer LaVern Baker.

Johnson first recorded in Chicago in 1937. One early song was "Sold It to the Devil". Over the next four years she recorded over 90 songs, including "Don't You Make Me High", "I'd Rather Be Drunk", and "Love with a Feeling". She recorded a few risqué songs.

Her speciality was a variety of juke joint blues, with songs such as "Drinking My Blues Away" and "I Just Keep on Drinking", delivered in a tough, unlovable voice. She was accompanied by Big Bill Broonzy, Lonnie Johnson, Blind John Davis, Buster Bennett, and Punch Miller. Her final recordings, not issued at the time, were cut in 1947.

== See also ==
- List of classic female blues singers
