= God-shaped hole =

God-shaped hole is a concept in theology. God-shaped hole or God-Shaped Hole may refer to:

- God-Shaped Hole, a 2002 novel by Tiffanie DeBartolo
- God Shaped Hole, a 2010 album by Reverend Freakchild
- "God-Shaped Hole", a song by Audio Adrenaline from the 1997 album Some Kind of Zombie
- "God-shaped Hole", a single by Christian singer Plumb from the 1999 album candycoatedwaterdrops
- God Shaped Hole, a 2025 album by Welsh rock band Those Damn Crows
