= Charlie McFadden =

Charlie McFadden may refer to:

- Charlie McFadden (character), a character in the Critters series
- Charlie "Specks" McFadden (1895–1966), American country blues singer and songwriter
