= Backwards Sam Firk =

American songwriter

- Born: Michael Addison Stewart; September 18, 1943; Asheville, North Carolina, United States
- Died: October 11, 2007 (aged 64) Mill Spring, North Carolina, United States
- Genres: Country blues
- Occupation(s): Singer, guitarist, songwriter, record collector and dealer
- Instrument(s): Guitar, vocals
- Years active: 1960s–1970s
- Labels: Various, including Adelphi Records

Michael Addison Stewart (September 18, 1943 – October 11, 2007), who performed and recorded as Backwards Sam Firk, was an American country blues singer, fingerstyle guitarist, songwriter, and record collector. Less well known than such contemporaries as Alan Wilson of Canned Heat and John Fahey, Backwards Sam Firk spent much of his music-based existence working with and supporting older blues artists. According to his friend Stephan Michelson, "He was, simply put, masterful. More than technique, he had taste. And more than technique and taste, he had originality. From his mentors and from records he did not so much copy notes as learn sounds and how to make them. He played old-time blues as if he was living in the 1930s, as if this was the music of his day. For him, it was."

== Life and career ==
Stewart was born in Asheville, North Carolina. His alias Backwards Sam Firk was an homage to the musician John Fahey, who had used the pseudonym Blind Thomas for some of his recordings. Stewart also explained that "My dad used to call me Backwards Sam because my initials are MAS."

His first recordings, under his stage name, were made for Joe Bussard's Fonotone Records in the early 1960s. He later collaborated on recordings with Fahey, when they were jointly billed as the Mississippi Swampers. His debut solo recording was the album The True Blues and Gospel, which was mainly a collection of cover versions of older blues numbers. It was released by Adelphi Records, an independent blues label based in Silver Spring, Maryland, partly owned by his then-wife. Adelphi conducted field trips, usually attended by Firk, in search of largely forgotten blues musicians from an earlier generation. Firk thus met and befriended the guitarist Richard "Hacksaw" Harney, Johnny Shines, Sunnyland Slim, David "Honeyboy" Edwards, and Big Joe Williams. In St. Louis, he also met and played with the pianist Henry Brown and Henry Townsend. Most notably, he backed Yank Rachell on a session for Blue Goose Records. His work with Townsend resulted in their joint album, Henry T. Music Man (1973).

Stewart again used the pseudonym Backwards Sam Firk for a couple of duet albums he made with the guitarist Stephan Michelson, alias Delta X. Firk gained an entry in the dirty blues category, by recording tracks such as "Cigarette" and "West Side Blues".

By the mid-1970s, Firk stopped recording and started to earn a living dealing in rare blues, folk and country records. He assembled one of the most important collections of vintage recordings ever held by one individual. He owned and operated his own record label, Green River Records, which issued compilation albums from his collection of old recordings.

Following a divorce from his first wife, Carol Rosenthal, he returned to North Carolina in 1991 and settled in Mill Spring. He later remarried.

He died of a heart attack at his home on October 11, 2007, aged 64.

== Discography ==
=== Albums ===
Year	Title	Record label	Credited to
1968	The True Blues and Gospel	Adelphi Records / Prospect Records	Backwards Sam Firk
1969	Deadly Duo	Adelphi Records	Backwards Sam Firk and Delta X
1973	Henry T. Music Man	Adelphi Records	Henry Townsend and Backwards Sam Firk
2001	What You Think This Is	The Physical World	Backwards Sam Firk and Delta X

== See also ==
- List of country blues musicians
- List of blues musicians
