= Guitar Pete Franklin =

American singer

- Born: Edward Lamonte Franklin; January 16, 1928; Indianapolis, Indiana, U.S.
- Died: July 31, 1975 (aged 47) Indianapolis, Indiana, U.S.
- Genres: Blues
- Occupations: Singer, musician, songwriter
- Instruments: Vocals, guitar, piano
- Years active: 1940s–1975
- Labels: Bluesville Records, various

Edward Lamonte Franklin (January 16, 1928 – July 31, 1975), better known as Guitar Pete Franklin, was an American blues singer, musician and songwriter. His best known track was "Guitar Pete's Blues".

Franklin variously worked with a number of fellow blues musicians including St. Louis Jimmy Oden, Jazz Gillum, John Brim, Sunnyland Slim, and Tampa Red.

== Biography ==
Edward Lamonte Franklin was born in Indianapolis, Indiana. Despite being billed as "Guitar Pete Franklin", he was equally adept on the piano. His guitar work was influenced by the work of Scrapper Blackwell, whilst on the piano his style was similar to his mother's one time lodger, Leroy Carr.

A versatile and accomplished musician, Franklin was able to adapt to electric blues, and provided backing to many musicians. His first recording took place in 1947, when he accompanied St. Louis Jimmy Oden on guitar for the latter's single "Coming Up Fast". Franklin's own work started in 1949 with his single release, "Casey Brown Blues". Franklin's other duties included making recordings with Jazz Gillum, John Brim, Sunnyland Slim, and Tampa Red.

In 1963, Bluesville Records released The Blues of Pete Franklin: Guitar Pete's Blues, which was recorded on July 12, 1961, in Indianapolis. The album contained Franklin's most famous song "Guitar Pete's Blues".

Franklin died in Indianapolis, Indiana, in July 1975 from a heart disease, aged 47.

== Discography ==
=== Album ===
Year	Title	Record label
1963	The Blues of Pete Franklin: Guitar Pete's Blues	Bluesville Records

=== Single ===
Year	Title	Record label
1949	"Casey Brown Blues"	RCA Victor Records
