= Sam Collins (musician) =

American blues singer and guitarist

- Also known as: Crying Sam Collins; Jim Foster
- Born: possibly August 11, 1887 possibly Louisiana, or possibly Kentucky, U.S.
- Died: possibly October 20, 1949 possibly Chicago
- Genres: Blues
- Occupation: Musician
- Instruments: Vocal; Guitar
- Label: Gennett

Sam Collins (possibly August 11, 1887 – possibly October 20, 1949), sometimes known as Crying Sam Collins, was an early American blues singer and guitarist. His style has been described as "South Mississippi", rather than Delta blues and "The Jail House Blues" is his best-known recording.

== Biography ==
Collins was born in Louisiana and grew up in McComb, Mississippi, just across the state line. By 1924, he was performing in local barrelhouses, often with King Solomon Hill; both of them sang falsetto parts and played slide guitar. Collins's first recording in 1927 was "Yellow Dog Blues", made for Gennett Records and recorded in Richmond, Indiana. His bottleneck guitar was referred to as a "git-fiddle" on record labels of the time, and blues historian Robert Palmer noted that his guitar "seemed to literally weep".

Collins recorded again in 1931 for the American Record Corporation in New York; some of his later recordings appeared under different pseudonyms, such as Jim Foster on Champion records, Jelly Roll Hunter on Silvertone and Supertone records, Big Boy Woods and Bunny Carter on Bell Records, and Salty Dog Sam. For Collins himself this meant that even when his records sold, he often had no way of proving that he was the performer entitled to payment. His rural bottleneck guitar pieces were among the first to be compiled on LP.

In the late 1930s, Collins relocated to Chicago, where he died from heart disease in October 1949, at the age of 62.

== Discography ==
=== Compilations ===
- 14 Rare Country Blues by Sam Collins & 2 Surprises by King Solomon Hill (Origin Jazz Library, 1965)
- Jailhouse Blues (Yazoo, 1990)
- King of the Blues Vol. 11 (P-Vine, 1992)
- Complete Recorded Works in Chronological Order 1927–1931 (Document, 1992)

=== Songs ===
1927, Richmond, Indiana

- "The Jailhouse Blues"
- "I Want to Be Like Jesus in My Heart"
- "Yellow Dog Blues"
- "Loving Lady Blues"
- "Riverside Blues"
- "Devil in the Lion's Den"
- "Dark Cloudy Blues"
- "Pork Chop Blues"
- "Lead Me All the Way"
- "Midnight Special Blues"
- "Do That Thing"
- "Hesitation Blues"
- "It Won't Be Long Now"
- "The Worried Man Blues"
- "The Moanin' Blues"

1931, New York City

- "Lonesome Road Blues"
- "Slow Mama Slow"
- "My Road Is Rough and Rocky"
- "New Salty Dog"
- "Graveyard Digger's Blues"
- "Signifying Blues"
- "I'm Still Sitting on Top of the World"
