= Sonny Rodgers =

American singer

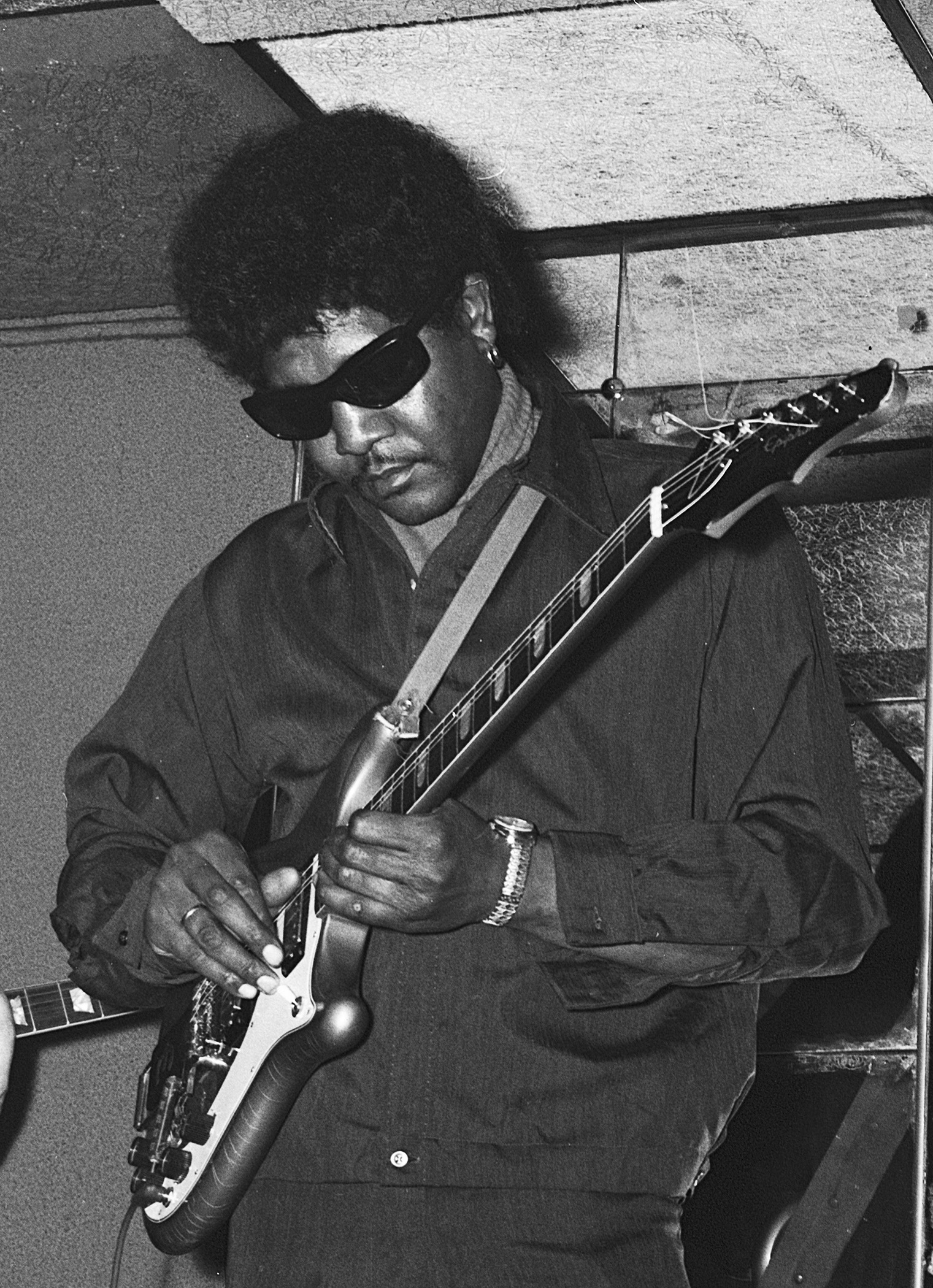
- Sonny Rodgers at the Cozy Bar, Minneapolis, March 13, 1970

Background information
- Also known as: Cat Daddy
- Born: Oliver Lee Rodgers; December 4, 1939; Hughes, Arkansas, United States
- Died: May 7, 1990 (aged 50) Minneapolis, Minnesota, United States
- Genres: Blues
- Occupations: Guitarist, singer, songwriter
- Instruments: Guitar, vocals
- Years active: 1950s–1990

Oliver Lee "Sonny" Rodgers (December 4, 1939 – May 7, 1990) was an American electric blues guitarist, singer and songwriter. He won a W.C. Handy Award for his release "Cadillac Baby" b/w "Big Leg Woman", which the Blues Foundation deemed to be the 'Blues Single of 1990'. His subsequent debut album, They Call Me the Cat Daddy, was acclaimed but coincided with his early death in May 1990, just prior to embarking on a UK tour.

He variously worked with Forest City Joe, Joe Hill Louis, Joe Willie Wilkins, Eddie Boyd, Lazy Bill Lucas, Muddy Waters, George "Mojo" Buford, and Willie Cobbs.

== Life and career ==
Rodgers was born in 1939 near Hughes, Arkansas, United States, and he learned to play the guitar from his father, who hailed from the Deep South. His playing was influenced by B.B. King, Robert Nighthawk and Muddy Waters. Rodgers formed his first band at the age of 17 and, in October 1959, was recorded by Alan Lomax accompanying Forest City Joe. Rodgers performed throughout Arkansas and beyond from 1960, before relocating briefly to Texas. In 1961, he moved on to Minneapolis, Minnesota, where he began a lengthy association with George "Mojo" Buford. In 1970, Rodgers recorded with Lazy Bill Lucas for the latter's album, Lazy Bill & His Friends.

Rodgers long association with Buford led to the latter recommending him in 1972 to Muddy Waters, to replace Sammy Lawhorn in Waters' band. After his short spell playing in Waters band ended, Rodgers spent several years away from the music industry. However, he returned to performing in 1979, playing on Mojo Buford's Chicago Blues Summit, and then forming his own band. He collected several music awards over the next decade or two in Minnesota.

Blue Moon Records single "Cadillac Baby" b/w "Big Leg Woman", billed as by Sonny Rodgers and the Cat Scratchers, was voted 'Blues Single of 1990' in the W.C. Handy Awards. Following this success, Rodgers released what turned out to be both his debut album and final studio recordings. The resultant LP, They Call Me the Cat Daddy (1990), was highly acclaimed, but only just preceded Rodgers early death. The bassist playing on two tracks was Biscuit Miller. Miller went on to play in Lonnie Brooks' band and became a "frontman" himself, releasing three albums. Sonny's album incorporated mainly blues standards including "Black Nights are Falling", "Walkin' Thru the Park", "Five Long Years", "Fever", "Stand by Me", and "Good Morning Little School Girl"; as well as several of Rodgers' original numbers.

In May 1990, Rodgers died of heart failure in Minneapolis, Minnesota, at the age of 50.

== Discography ==
=== Singles ===
Year	A-side	B-side	Record label
1989	"Cadillac Baby"	"Big Leg Woman"	Blue Moon Records

=== Albums ===
Year	Title	Record label
1990	They Call Me the Cat Daddy	Fattening Frogs

== See also ==
- List of electric blues musicians
