= Son Bonds =

American country blues guitarist, singer and songwriter (1909–1947)

- Also known as: "Brownsville" Son Bonds, Brother Son Bonds
- Born: Abraham John Bond Jr. March 16, 1909; Brownsville, Tennessee, United States
- Died: August 31, 1947 (aged 38) Dyersburg, Tennessee, United States
- Genres: Country blues
- Occupations: Singer, guitarist, songwriter
- Instruments: Vocals, guitar, kazoo
- Formerly of: Sleepy John Estes, Hammie Nixon

Abraham John Bond Jr., known as Son Bonds (March 16, 1909 – August 31, 1947), was an American country blues guitarist, singer and songwriter. He was a working associate of Sleepy John Estes and Hammie Nixon. He was similar to Estes in his guitar-playing style. According to the music journalist Jim O'Neal, "the music to one of Bonds's songs, 'Back and Side Blues' (1934), became a standard blues melody when Sonny Boy Williamson I, from nearby Jackson, Tennessee, used it in his classic "Good Morning, School Girl". The best-known of Bonds's other works are "A Hard Pill to Swallow" and "Come Back Home."

== Biography ==
Bonds was born in Brownsville, Tennessee. He was also billed on records as "Brownsville" Son Bonds and Brother Son Bonds.

Sleepy John Estes, in his earlier recordings, was backed by Yank Rachell (mandolin) or Hammie Nixon (harmonica), but by the late 1930s he was accompanied in the recording studio by either Bonds or Charlie Pickett (guitar). Bonds also backed Estes on a couple of recording sessions in 1941. In return, either Estes or Nixon played on every one of Bonds's own recordings. In the latter part of his career, Bonds played the kazoo as well as the guitar on several tracks.

According to Nixon's later accounts of the event, Bonds suffered an accidental death in August 1947. While sitting on his front porch late one evening in Dyersburg, Tennessee, Bonds was shot to death by his nearsighted neighbor, who mistook him for another man, with whom the neighbor was having a protracted disagreement.

== Discography ==
- Complete Recorded Works in Chronological Order (1991), Wolf Records

This compilation album contains all known recordings by Bonds, made between September 1934 and September 1941.

== See also ==
- List of blues musicians
- List of country blues musicians
