= Dorothea Trowbridge =

- Born: c. 1914 (possibly) Dublin, Georgia, United States
- Origin: St. Louis, Missouri, United States
- Died: unknown
- Genres: Blues
- Occupation: Singer

Dorothea Trowbridge (born c. 1914), first name also spelled Dorthea, Doretha, was an American blues singer active in St. Louis in the 1930s. A few recordings by her remain, at least one of which includes lyrics on the theme of "grinding".

== Career ==
Trowbridge is thought to have been born in Dublin, Georgia. She became a singer in St. Louis in the early 1930s, and she was taken to Chicago in 1933 to record a number of songs.

One of her recording sessions was with James "Stump" Johnson on August 2, 1933, during which she recorded a version of the raunchy "Steady Grinding". It is likely that she is identical with Dorothy Baker, who recorded the song "Steady Grinding Blues" with Roosevelt Sykes in 1930 and/or 1934 (Decca 7080).

Ain't but the one thing that makes me sore,
When you grind me one time and just won't do it no more.

— Dorothea Trowbridge, "Steady Grinding"

She is credited for the words and music of the song "Bad Luck Blues", which she recorded in 1933; it is registered in the US Copyright Catalog for January 24, 1935.

Steady grindin' now, you can't come in,
Take the key outta the hole 'cause it's too bad Jim.

— Dorothy Baker, "Steady Grinding Blues"

In his memoir, Henry Townsend recalled that she was at one time the girlfriend of pianist Roosevelt Sykes and that she got to record through Sykes, or possibly through Jesse Johnson, the brother of "Stump" Johnson; he also mentioned that in the early 1930s she was singing in many places around town, and had recorded with St. Louis pianist Pinetop Sparks ("Slavin' Mama Blues"). "Slavin' Mama Blues" is included in an anthology of Barrelhouse blues, Barrelhouse women 1925-1933 (1984). In recent scholarship, the explicit lyrics for "Steady Grinding" (and those for "Steady Grinding Blues", "grind" meaning "to copulate") have drawn attention for the statements they make about female sexuality and empowerment among African American women of the early 20th century; among those early blueswomen scholars find "numerous open declarations of erotic desire".

== Recordings ==
- August 2, 1933, Chicago: "Grinding Blues", with James "Stump" Johnson, Bluebird B-5159
- August 2, 1933, Chicago: "Slavin' Mama Blues"/"Bad Luck Blues", with Pinetop Sparks, Bluebird 5431
- 1933: "Bad Luck Blues", with Pinetop Sparks

== See also ==
- St. Louis blues (music)
