= The Duck Yas-Yas-Yas =

"The Duck-Yas-Yas-Yas"

Single by James "Stump" Johnson
- B-side: "The Snitchers Blues"
- Released: 1929
- Recorded: January 1929
- Genre: Hokum
- Length: 2:54
- Label: QRS (no. 7049-A)
- Songwriter: Unknown

"The Duck Yas-Yas-Yas" or "The Duck's Yas Yas Yas" is a hokum jazz-blues song, originally recorded by James "Stump" Johnson, but the most well known version was recorded by Oliver Cobb and his Rhythm Kings. The song is perhaps best known for the lyrics:

Mama bought a rooster
She thought it was a duck
She served it at the table with its legs straight up

== Background ==
The song is a "whorehouse tune", "a popular St. Louis party song." The song's title is explained by quoting the lyrics more fully: "Shake your shoulders, shake 'em fast, if you can't shake your shoulders, shake your yas-yas-yas".

== Recordings ==
"The Duck's Yas Yas Yas" was originally recorded in St. Louis by pianist James "Stump" Johnson in late 1928 or January 1929. He recorded the tune at least three times during his career. Blues singer Tampa Red and Thomas A. Dorsey also recorded a version on May 13, 1929. Oliver Cobb recorded the song on August 16, 1929, before he died suddenly the next year. Eddie Johnson and The Crackerjacks recorded a cover of the song in 1932. In 1939, Tommy McClennan used some of the lyrics in his song "Bottle It Up and Go". It has been covered by The Three Peppers and by King Perry & His Pied Pipers (1951) in a hardly recognizable clean version. The song has also been performed by American folk singer Dave Van Ronk as "Yas Yas Yas" on his album Van Ronk Sings (1961), but his source was a variant recorded in the Bahamas by Blind Blake & his Royal Victoria Hotel Calypso Band under the name "Yes! Yes! Yes!" (released on Miami's Art Records label in 1951). John Lee Hooker used the first lines of the song in several of his interpretations of "Bottle Up and Go".

== Other adaptations ==
The cartoonist Robert Crumb quoted the song in his comic strip album Zap Comix, no. 0, in 1967. It is quoted in the first panel of a story called "Ducks Yas Yas". He also recorded the tune in 1972 with his band, the Good Tone Banjo Boys (released on a transparent red vinyl 78 rpm stereo record). "The Duck's Yas-Yas-Ya" is also referenced on Captain Beefheart's album Trout Mask Replica (1969), on the track "Old Fart at Play", in which Beefheart sings, "Momma licked 'er lips like a cat, pecked the ground like a rooster, pivoted like a duck", mentioning all three protagonists from the most famous line of the blues song.

Christian recording artist Larry Norman recorded a version of the song on his 1981 album Something New Under the Son. Norman's version changes the tone of the song to that of a somewhat humorous cautionary tale and is renamed as "Watch What You're Doing." Norman took full writing credit for the song in the album's accompanying liner notes. Norman's version opens with the lyrics "Mama killed a chicken, thought it was a duck, she put it on the table with its legs sticking up, Papa broke his glasses, when he fell down drunk, tried to drown the kitty-cat, turned out to be a skunk, ya gotta watch what you're doing."

Jon Spencer Blues Explosion quoted the first three lines of the song in "Chicken Dog," on the album Now I Got Worry, sung by Rufus Thomas.
