= Doctor Clayton =

American musician

Doctor Clayton (born Peter Joe Clayton; April 19, 1898 – January 7, 1947) was an American blues singer and songwriter.

== Biography ==
Clayton was born in Georgia (though he claimed he had been born in Africa) and moved to St. Louis as a child with his family. He had four children and worked in a factory in St. Louis, where he started his career as a singer (he could also play the piano and the ukulele but never did so on record). Clayton recorded six sides for Bluebird Records in 1935, but only two were issued. Clayton's entire family died in a house fire in 1937; following this he became an alcoholic and began wearing outsized hats and glasses. To pursue his music career, Clayton moved to Chicago with Robert Lockwood, and he received attention from Decca Records, thanks to a helpful recommendation from another musician, Charley Jordan. Ultimately Clayton returned to Bluebird, recording with Lockwood, the bassist Robert (Ransom) Knowling, the pianist Blind John Davis, and Lester Melrose, in 1941–42. He also recorded for Okeh Records at this time.

Among the songs he wrote were "Cheating and Lying Blues", frequently covered by other blues artists; "Pearl Harbor Blues", written after the Pearl Harbor bombing of 1941; and "Moonshine Women Blues", which became a chart hit for B.B. King under the name "The Woman I Love" in 1968. He recorded again in 1946, recording the tunes "Hold That Train, Conductor" and "I Need My Baby", which were also both covered by B.B. King. Most of his later recordings featured Blind John Davis on piano. He was a regional sales success and played regularly in Chicago nightclubs with Lockwood and Sunnyland Slim. Attesting to his companion's popularity, Slim worked as "Dr. Clayton's Buddy" in his debut recording session, in 1947. In the same year, Willie "Long Time" Smith recorded, "My Buddy Doctor Clayton".

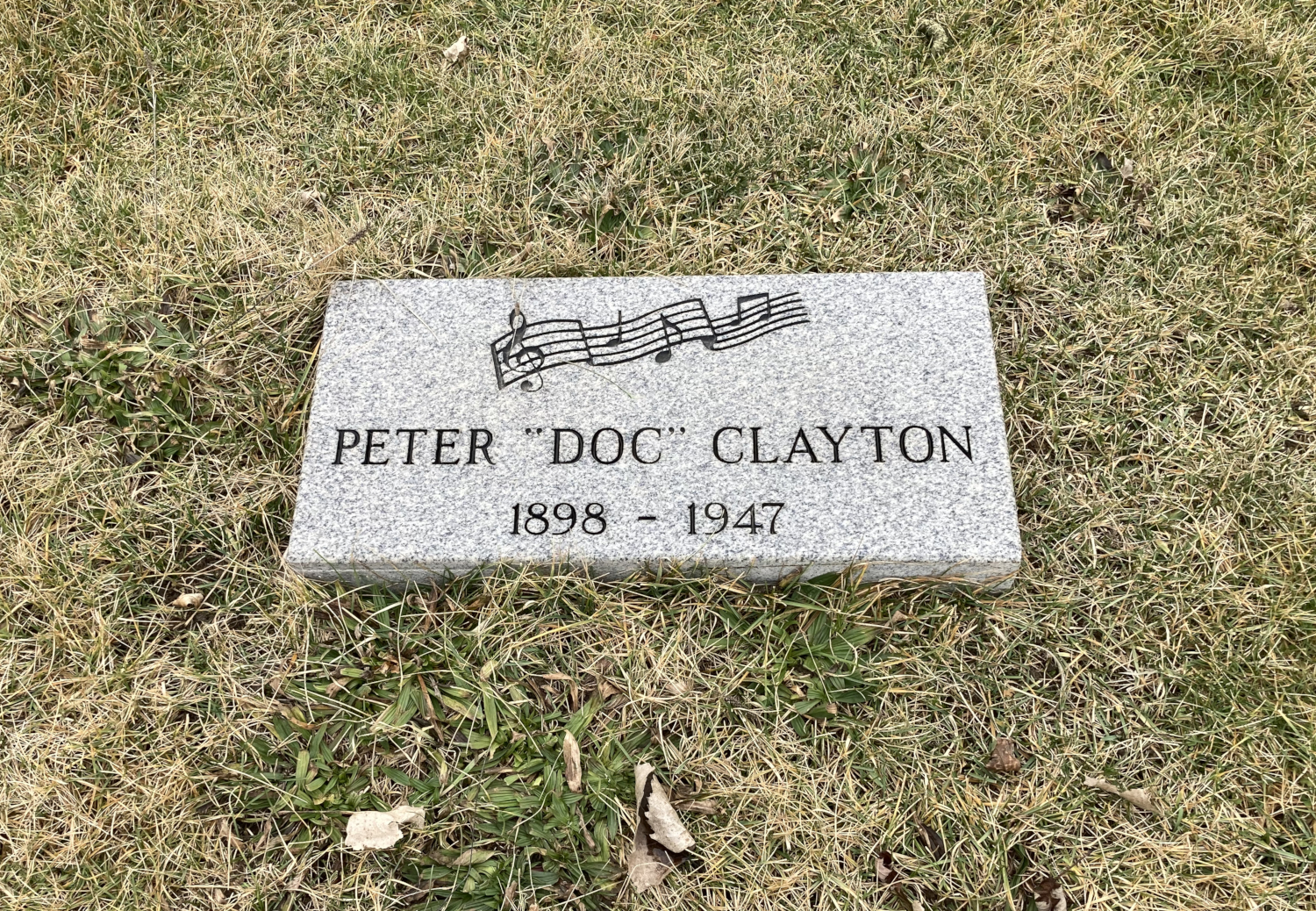
Clayton's grave at Restvale Cemetery

Clayton died of tuberculosis on January 7, 1947, in Chicago. Big Bill Broonzy and Tampa Red attended his funeral. He was buried at Restvale Cemetery in Alsip, Illinois. In 2014 the Killer Blues Headstone Project placed a headstone there for him.

Document Records released all of Clayton's output recorded between 1935 and 1942 on one CD. Old Tramp Records released the remaining 1946 recordings.

== Discography ==
- Doctor Clayton & His Buddy: Pearl Harbour Blues (Camden/RCA International, 1970)
- Gotta Find My Baby (Bluetime/Swingtime, 1987)
- Doctor Clayton and His Buddy (1935–1947) (DA Music, 1989) -with Sunnyland Slim
- Complete Recorded Works (1935–1942) (Document, 1993)
- Doctor Clayton & His Buddies: Complete Recordings 1946 & 1947 (Old Tramp, 1994) -with Sunnyland Slim, Willie "Long Time" Smith
- Angels in Harlem (P-Vine, 1999)
