= Hammie Nixon =

American blues harmonica player (1908–1984)

Background information
- Also known as: Hammie Nickerson
- Born: January 22, 1908; Brownsville, Tennessee, U.S.
- Died: August 17, 1984 (aged 76) Jackson, Tennessee, U.S.
- Genres: Country blues
- Occupation: Musician
- Instruments: Harmonica; kazoo; guitar
- Years active: 1920s–1980s
- Labels: Victor Records

Hammie Nixon (January 22, 1908 – August 17, 1984) was an American blues harmonica player.

== Biography ==
Nixon was born in Brownsville, Tennessee. He began his music career with jug bands in the 1920s. He is best known as a country blues harmonica player, but he also played the kazoo, guitar and jug. He played with his father-in-law, guitarist Sleepy John Estes, for half a century, first recording with him in 1929 for Victor Records. He also recorded with Little Buddy Doyle, Lee Green, Clayton T. Driver, Charlie Pickett and Son Bonds.

During the 1920s Nixon helped to pioneer the use of the harmonica as a rhythm instrument in a band setting, rather than as a novelty solo instrument. After Estes died in 1979, Nixon played with the Beale Street Jug Band (also called the Memphis Jug Band). Nixon's last recording, Tappin' That Thing (HMG Records), was recorded shortly before his death in 1984, in Jackson, Tennessee.

== Albums ==
- 1984 Tappin' That Thing (HMG Records)

== See also ==
- Blues harp
- List of harmonica blues musicians
- List of harmonicists
