= Herman E. Johnson =

American country blues guitarist

Johnson in 1961.

Herman E. Johnson (born August 18, 1909 – February 2, 1975) was an American country blues guitarist. He was recorded by folklorist Harry Oster in Louisiana, in 1961.

== Biography ==
According to his army draft card, Johnson was born in Zachary, Louisiana on August 18, 1909. He later spoke about his early life and conversion to the blues in an interview: "I had a good religious father, a good religious mother. They were both members of the Baptist church. I was the onliest jack of the family... So my life was just that way, to keep out of trouble, drink my little whiskey, and go and do ugly little things like that". Johnson's religious background influenced his later guitar styles; he learned to play the instrument, sometimes laying flat on his knees, in 1927 to undo the boredom of several odd jobs, including cotton picking, concrete mixing, and working in a scrap metal yard. Another major influence Johnson credited was reputable Texas blues musician Blind Lemon Jefferson.

Johnson was still living in rural Zachary when he received his army call-up. A military questionnaire, dated October 24, 1940, indicated he had a wife named Elizabeth and was employed at a chemical plant. In 1961, while working as a janitor at Southern University, Johnson was recorded in Baton Rouge by folklorist Harry Oster. Oster’s field recording session with Johnson, along with numerous other blues musicians, were preserved in the Library of Congress. Among Johnson's songs, his "Depression Blues", a recollection of his frantic search for a job, is his most memorable.

After suffering a stroke in 1970, Johnson retired from performing. He died in 1975 at 65 years-old. His recordings were compiled on the album Louisiana Country Blues on Arhoolie Records, in 1972. The album was reissued in 1996 on CD along with another guitarist Smoky Babe. Cub Koda, in his review of the album, described the pair's sound as "back porch country blues of the highest order".
