= Biscuit Miller =

American singer and bassist (born 1961)

- Born: David Leon Miller; December 30, 1961 (age 64); Chicago, Illinois, United States
- Genres: Electric blues, funk
- Occupations: Bassist, singer, songwriter
- Instrument: Bass guitar
- Years active: 1980s–present
- Website: Official website

David Leon "Biscuit" Miller (born December 30, 1961) is an American electric blues bassist, singer and songwriter. He writes most of his own material, and has released four albums to date. In 2012 and 2017, Miller won a Blues Music Award in the 'Instrumentalist - Bass' category.

His best known songs include "Lay It On Down", " Bottle of Whiskey Bottle of Wine", "Going Home", "One More Mile", "Monday Morning Blues", and "Wishbone". Miller performed at the Bradenton Blues Festival in December 2017. Down Beat described him as "a real crowd-pleaser."

== Life and career ==
Miller was born in South Side, Chicago, Illinois, United States, and was raised by his grandmother. His childhood nickname of 'Biscuit' was acquired when just before supper, Miller ate a pan of his grandmother's biscuits. He found a four string electric bass guitar belonging to his friend's elder brother and immediately was inspired to try to play the instrument. Miller discovered the blues via his connection to Willie Dixon. "I went to school with Willie's kids," Miller said, "and Willie did one of the first blues programs in Chicago. Once, he brought in this little kid named Lucky Peterson" and Miller noted "hearing the band play excited... and made me want to play music." Miller formed his first band named Clever with his cousin, Ivan Wallace, and they jointly relocated to Minneapolis in 1982.

Miller went on to work with Sonny Rodgers, from whom he learned a great deal about playing the blues and they recorded an album, They Call Me the Cat Daddy. It won Rodgers a Handy Award for Best New Artist, although he died before he could accept his award. Miller moved on to backing George "Mojo" Buford and Lady Blue (a backing vocalist for Ike & Tina Turner). During this time, he was asked if he could step in for one night to play the bass behind another Chicago born blues musician, Lonnie Brooks. His tenure lasted for over ten years in Brooks backing band, including playing at the second inauguration of Bill Clinton. In 2000, he formed Biscuit and The Mix to fill in time between commitments to Brooks and they recorded Miller's debut album, Come Together (2002). Miller also played informally with Anthony Gomes, before joining his band as a full-time member in time to record Sweet Stringin' Soul. During his five-year stint with Gomes, Miller contributed to the studio albums Sweet Stringin' Soul (2000), Unity (2002), and Music is the Medicine (2006).

By 2009, Miller had formed his own band. Miller noted that "I was getting on up in my 50s... I'd done all this playing with everybody else, and it just seemed like time. I can play this bass fairly well and I can sing a little bit and I know how to smile." Blues with a Smile was released in 2010. Guest performers included Billy Branch on harmonica, Ronnie Baker Brooks and Shawn Kellerman on guitar and Andrew "Blaze" Thomas on drums. They played alongside Miller's regular backing outfit, the Mix. In 2012 Miller gained his first Blues Music Award, whilst Blues with a Smile, received airplay on Sirius XM Radio. In 2013, Miller performed at the Daytona Blues Festival.

His recording Wishbone (2016), where the title track was inspired by Miller's two grandsons being excited about making a wish on the turkey wishbone during their Thanksgiving dinner. In May 2017, Miller won his second Blues Music Award in the 'Instrumentalist - Bass' category.

He currently resides in Highland, Lake County, Indiana, but is based in Indianapolis.

== Discography ==
=== Albums ===
Year	Title	Record label
2002	Come Together	Blue Bass Entertainment
2010	Blues with a Smile	Blue Bass Entertainment
2016	Chicken Grease	Blue Bass Entertainment
2019	Wishbone	American Showplace Music

== See also ==
- List of electric blues musicians
