= Buddy Boy Hawkins =

American songwriter

- Born: Walter Hawkins
- Genres: Country blues
- Occupations: Guitarist, singer, songwriter
- Instruments: Guitar, vocals
- Years active: 1927–1929
- Label: Paramount

Walter "Buddy Boy" Hawkins was an American country blues guitarist, singer, and songwriter. He recorded only 12 songs, between 1927 and 1929, but Paul Oliver opined that "Hawkins was a major figure in black country music". AllMusic noted that he was "one of the most distinctive country-blues performers of the pre-war era, a gifted vocalist whose taste for slow, dirge-like songs was ideally suited to his intricate guitar work."

Details of Hawkins's life outside of his brief recording career are minimal.

== Life and career ==
The date and place of his birth are unknown, but there is consensus among blues historians that Hawkins probably originated in either Alabama or, somewhat less definitely, the northern Mississippi Delta.

Hawkins recorded a dozen tracks for Paramount Records between 1927 and 1929. Many of his lyrics mention the railroad, with some hint that he had worked laying rail track. The first 10-inch 78-rpm shellac single released by Paramount was "Number Three Blues" backed with "Snatch It Back Blues", recorded about April 1927 in Chicago. Paramount released another five singles between 1927 and 1929; these later recordings were issued under his birth name, Walter Hawkins. His tracks included the slightly peculiar "Voice Throwin' Blues", in which he employed a call and response banter between two voices, one purportedly being a ventriloquist's dummy. "A Rag Blues" contained lyrics that hinted that its origins lay in Jackson, Mississippi, although it was performed in a Spanish-inflected style.

Hawkins played exclusively in open A tuning. His records sold poorly and he faded into obscurity. His life story after his recording career ended is shrouded in mystery.

Given their rarity and the length of time that has passed since they were made, an original Hawkins gramophone record in used condition is worth somewhere between $500 and $1,500.

All of Hawkins's known work has been compiled on an album released by Document Records.

== Songs ==
- "Shaggy Dog Blues"
- "Number Three Blues"
- "Jailhouse Fire Blues"
- "Snatch It Back Blues"
- "Workin' on the Railroad"
- "Yellow Woman Blues"
- "Raggin' the Blues"
- "Awful Fix Blues"
- "A Rag Blues"
- "How Come Mama Blues"
- "Snatch It and Grab It"
- "Voice Throwin' Blues"

== Selected compilation albums ==
Year	Title	Record label
1968	Buddy Boy Hawkins and His Buddies	Yazoo Records
1982	Complete Recorded Works in Chronological Order 1927–1929	Document Records

== See also ==
- List of country blues musicians

== Bibliography ==
- Calt, Stephen; Wardlow, Gayle (1988). King of the Delta Blues: The Life and Music of Charlie Patton. pp. 181–183. ISBN 0-9618610-0-2.
