= Forest City Joe =

American singer-songwriter

- Also known as: Forrest City Joe
- Born: Joe Bennie Pugh; July 10, 1926; Hughes, Arkansas, United States
- Died: April 3, 1960 (aged 33) Horseshoe Lake, Arkansas, United States
- Genres: Blues
- Occupations: Musician
- Instruments: Harmonica, vocals
- Years active: Early 1940s–1960
- Labels: Aristocrat; Atlantic

Joe Bennie Pugh (July 10, 1926 – April 3, 1960), known as Forrest City Joe or Forest City Joe, was an American blues musician who is mainly remembered for his ability as a harmonica player. He performed with other major blues acts of the period; he was the harmonica player in Muddy Waters's first band and regularly performed in the Chicago area. Despite his meager recording career, Joe was considered one of the top harmonica players of the era.

Pugh was born in Hughes, Arkansas, near Forrest City, and was raised on a cotton farm as an uneducated field worker. As a young boy, he began helping entertainers and playing in local venues, having taught himself to play the harmonica and other instruments. In the early 1940s, Pugh expanded his touring in Arkansas. His playing was heavily influenced by John Lee "Sonny Boy" Williamson. Pugh imitated Williamson's style and vocals, but over time he developed his own unique sound. Later in the decade Pugh met Big Joe Williams, and the two performed together in the St. Louis area. In 1947, Pugh went under the stage name Forrest City Joe, and relocated to Chicago for performances.

On December 2, 1948, Joe recorded a single in his only session at Aristocrat Records (later Chess Records). Muddy Waters was intended to be a session musician for the recording, but instead Joe was paired with J. C. Coles, a jazz guitarist, who contributed very little to the recordings. A single resulted from the sessions, but other songs were unissued because the guitarist had hindered the recordings. Joe and Waters had previously been working together in a band, and Waters remembered Joe as being a "great harp player". In 1949, shortly after Williamson's death, the single, "Memory of Sonny Boy" backed with "A Woman on Every Street", was released (credited to Forest City Joe) but was not commercially successful. Joe briefly moved to Memphis to perform on radio programs with Howlin' Wolf and Rice Miller – who had adopted the name Sonny Boy Williamson – and found employment with Willie Love's Three Aces.

He returned to Chicago in 1949, and lived on South Ellis Avenue, where his home became a meeting place for fellow musicians in the area. Joe worked in a band headed by Otis Spann, which mostly performed at the Tick Tock Lounge. The band stayed together for four years, until Spann left to join Muddy Waters's new band. In 1955, Joe moved back to Arkansas and generally removed himself from the music scene, except for occasional gigs with Willie Cobbs in small venues. In August 1959, Joe was located by Alan Lomax, and he recorded for the final time for the Atlantic label. Joe started performing more and was expected to return to Chicago.

However, he died on April 3, 1960, at the age of 33, when his truck flipped over after returning from a dance in Horseshoe Lake, Arkansas. The crash crushed Joe's skull, killing him instantly. In 1995, a compilation album entitled Downhome Delta Harmonica was released on the DeltaCat label. The album covers all of Joe's material along with that of another musician, Polka Dot Slim.
