= Little Buddy Doyle =

American blues guitarist, singer and songwriter (1911–c. 1960)

- Born: Charley Doyle; March 20, 1911; Cordova, Tennessee, U.S.
- Died: c. 1960 Bolivar, Tennessee, U.S.
- Genres: Country blues; Memphis blues
- Occupations: Guitarist; singer-songwriter
- Instruments: Vocals; guitar
- Labels: Okeh; Vocalion

Little Buddy Doyle (March 20, 1911 – c. 1960) was an American Memphis blues and country blues guitarist, singer and songwriter. He was a working associate of the harmonica players Big Walter Horton and Hammie Nixon, the guitarist David "Honeyboy" Edwards, and the pianist Sunnyland Slim.

== Early life and education ==
Doyle was born Charley Doyle in Cordova, Tennessee, on March 20, 1911.

== Career ==
During the 1930s, he performed regularly on Beale Street, in Memphis, Tennessee.

Big Walter Horton made his first recording backing Doyle on eight songs recorded in Memphis for Okeh Records and Vocalion Records in 1939. Doyle, who was known locally for often suffering the effects of moonshine, jimson weed or other intoxicants, included the lines "my mind in such a condition till I hardly know the days of the week" on the track "Bad in Mind Blues". Doyle also recorded with Nixon around the same time; some of their recorded work remains unissued.

Most of what else is known about Doyle derives from the autobiography of Edwards, who met him in Memphis in 1935, where Doyle regularly performed in Handy Park. He was still performing in Handy Park when Edwards returned to Memphis in 1943, at which time Edwards sometimes performed in the park with Doyle, Horton and the young Little Walter. Edwards remembered Doyle clearly and described him as a charismatic figure. According to Edwards, Doyle was a red-eyed alcoholic, was drunk all the time and had two or three gold teeth. His nickname, Little Buddy, was likely due to his diminutive stature; according to Edwards, Doyle "was a midget. His legs was so short that when he sat on the bench to play the guitar he couldn´t pat his feet. He had to just bump against the seat, his feet would be that far off the ground. He´d get to playing the blues and just bump, bump, bump."

When Edwards met him in 1935, Doyle was married to Hedda, who was six feet tall. According to Edwards, Hedda too was "a good guitar player in the key of G." She sometimes performed with Doyle.

== Death ==
In around 1960, Doyle died in Bolivar, Tennessee, at the approximate age of 49.

== See also ==
- List of country blues musicians
- List of Memphis blues musicians

== Discography ==
Doyle's known tracks include "Bad in Mind Blues"; "Grief Will Kill You", "Hard Scufflin' Blues", "Lost Baby Blues", "Renewed Love Blues", "She's Got Good Dry Goods", "Slick Caper Blues", "Sweet Man Blues" and "Three Sixty Nine Blues". Several are featured on the following compilation albums.

Album title	Record label	Year of release
Sounds of Memphis (1933–1939)	Story of the Blues Records	1987
Roots 'n Blues: The Retrospective 1925–1950	Legacy Recordings	1992
