= Willie "Long Time" Smith =

- Genres: Chicago blues
- Occupation(s): Pianist, singer, songwriter
- Instrument(s): Piano, vocals
- Years active: 1940s–1950s
- Labels: Columbia Records

Willie "Long Time" Smith was an American Chicago blues pianist and singer. Little is known of his life outside of music, and his total recordings amount to ten tracks.

== Biography ==
Smith was performing regularly, largely in Chicago, starting after World War II. His nickname of "Long Time" was mainly to distinguish him from two other musicians around at the same time; Willie "Big Eyes" Smith, the Chicago blues musician, and Willie "the Lion" Smith, a noted stride pianist. "Long Time" was the more obscure and less well recorded of the threesome, but he rubbed shoulders with the Chicago-based elite, including Doctor Clayton, with whom Smith had an enduring friendship. Clayton died of tuberculosis on January 7, 1947, in Chicago. In the same year, Smith recorded the tribute song, "My Buddy, Doctor Clayton". In total Smith recorded eight tracks for Columbia Records in 1947; in two sessions, held on June 13, and December 27 that year. Smith appeared to favour a boogie theme to some of his songwriting with his songs including "Dirty Deal Boogie" and "I Love You Baby Boogie". He was noted as an "exceptional vocalist" and "fine piano player". His recordings were also enhanced by the guitar work of an equally obscure guitarist, Willie Lacey. Inexplicably two songs, "Homeless Blues" and "Devilment on My Mind", were not issued at that time.

During the 1950s, Smith occasionally played in Arthur "Big Boy" Spires backing ensemble, the Rocket Four. In 1954, Smith was part of that group which recorded two sides backing Spires, namely "Dark and Stormy Night" and "Moody In the Morning". The favor was returned when Smith replaced Spires as the featured artist, for his final two offerings ("You Can't Tell" and "Wrapped in My Baby"), also recorded probably in December that year. All four sides were cut for United Records label, but for some reason they were not issued at that time. In 1982, the four tracks were released in Japan on Chicago Blues in the Groove (P-Vine Records).

No further details of Smith's life appear to exist.

== Discography ==
=== Singles ===
A-side	B-side	Record label	Year of release
"My Buddy, Doctor Clayton"	"I Love You Baby Boogie"	Columbia Records	1947
"No Special Rider Here"	"Due Respects To You"	Columbia Records	1948
"Dirty Deal Boogie"	"Flying Cloud Boogie"	Columbia Records	1948

=== Selected compilation albums ===
Album title	Record label	Year of release	Contains
The Beauty of the Blues	Columbia Records/Legacy Records	1991	"Homeless Blues"
Doctor Clayton and his Buddies 1946-1947	Old Tramp Records	1994	Most of Smith's known recordings (eight tracks, all from 1947)
Boogiology: The Boogie Woogie Masters	Great Voices of the Century	2009	"I Love You Baby Boogie"
