= Charlie "Specks" McFadden =

American songwriter

- Also known as: Charles "Speck" Pertum "Black Patch" McFadden
- Born: Charles Pertum; April 24, 1895; Quincy, Adams County, Illinois, United States
- Died: November 15, 1966 (aged 71) St. Louis, Missouri, United States
- Genres: Country blues
- Occupations: Singer, songwriter
- Instrument: Vocals
- Years active: 1929–1937
- Labels: Various including Paramount, Okeh, Decca and Bluebird

Charles Pertum, known professionally as Charlie "Specks" McFadden (April 24, 1895 – November 15, 1966), was an American country blues singer and songwriter. On his few recordings, released from 1929 to 1937, he was accompanied by Roosevelt Sykes, Lonnie Johnson, Pinetop Sparks and others. His most notable song was one he wrote, "Groceries on the Shelf (Piggly Wiggly)", which he recorded in Grafton, Wisconsin, about February 1930.

There is little information about his life outside of his recordings.

== Biography ==
Pertum was born in Quincy, Adams County, Illinois. He was the son of Maggie Pertum. He used Charles "Speck" Pertum as his name on a couple of his earliest recordings, and also used the nickname "Black Patch", both nicknames referring to his reported "weak eyes". On most of his recordings he used his stepfather's name, McFadden.

McFadden moved to St. Louis, Missouri, in 1921. He was considered to be one of the top blues singers in the city. He made his first recordings in 1929. He made friends with the blues pianist Roosevelt Sykes, who played on twelve of the twenty tracks that have been preserved. McFadden's most notable number was "Groceries on the Shelf (Piggly Wiggly)". He wrote the song and recorded three separate versions of it. A cover version of the song was recorded by Lucille Bogan. (Piggly Wiggly is the name of a supermarket chain operating in the Southern and Midwestern regions of the United States, which first opened in 1916.) Another of his tracks was "Gambler's Blues", the title of which he may have been well versed to expound. McFadden was arrested on 13 separate occasions between 1929 and 1935, with ten of those charges being for gambling. Little is known of his life apart from this.

McFadden died in St. Louis, Missouri, on November 15, 1966, aged 71.

== Discography ==
The following compilation album contains all of his recordings, except for four titles that have not been found.

- Complete Recorded Works 1929–1937. Document Records, 1994.

== See also ==
- List of country blues musicians
