= Smoky Babe =

American singer

- Born: Robert Brown; July 31, 1927; Itta Bena, Mississippi, United States
- Died: May 1973 (age 45) (probable) Baton Rouge, Louisiana, United States
- Genres: Louisiana blues, Piedmont blues
- Occupations: Guitarist, singer, songwriter
- Instruments: Guitar, vocals
- Years active: 1960s

Robert Brown (July 31, 1927 – May 1973), who performed as Smoky Babe, was an American acoustic blues guitarist and singer, whose recording career was restricted to a couple of recording sessions in the early 1960s. He has been variously described as a Louisiana blues, Piedmont blues and blues revival musician. His most noteworthy recordings are "Going Downtown Boogie" and "Ain't Got No Rabbit Dog".

== Career ==
Brown was born in Itta Bena, Mississippi. He was recorded by Harry Oster of Louisiana State University in 1960 and 1961, and the results were released by the Folk Lyric, Bluesville and Storyville labels.

Other than his recordings, little is known of his life. The circumstances of his death are unclear. Some sources report that he died in June 1975, but the researchers Bob Eagle and Eric LeBlanc have stated that he probably died in May 1973 in Scotlandville, Baton Rouge, Louisiana.

His song, "Boogy", is included on the compilation album Blues Roots: Give Me the Blues (1979), and "Hottest Brand Goin'" and "Locomotive Blues" are included in the collection The Bluesville Years, Vol. 9: Down the Country Way (1998).

== Discography ==
- Smoky Babe and His Friends: Hot Blues (1961), Folk-Lyric, 77 Records, Arhoolie
- Hottest Brand Goin' (1961), Bluesville (Reissued on CD as The Blues of Smokey Babe)
- Smoky Babe, Herman E. Johnson, Louisiana Country Blues (1997), Arhoolie
- Smoky Babe: Way Back in the Country Blues (2014), Arhoolie
