= Sleepy John Estes =

American blues singer-songwriter (d. 1977)

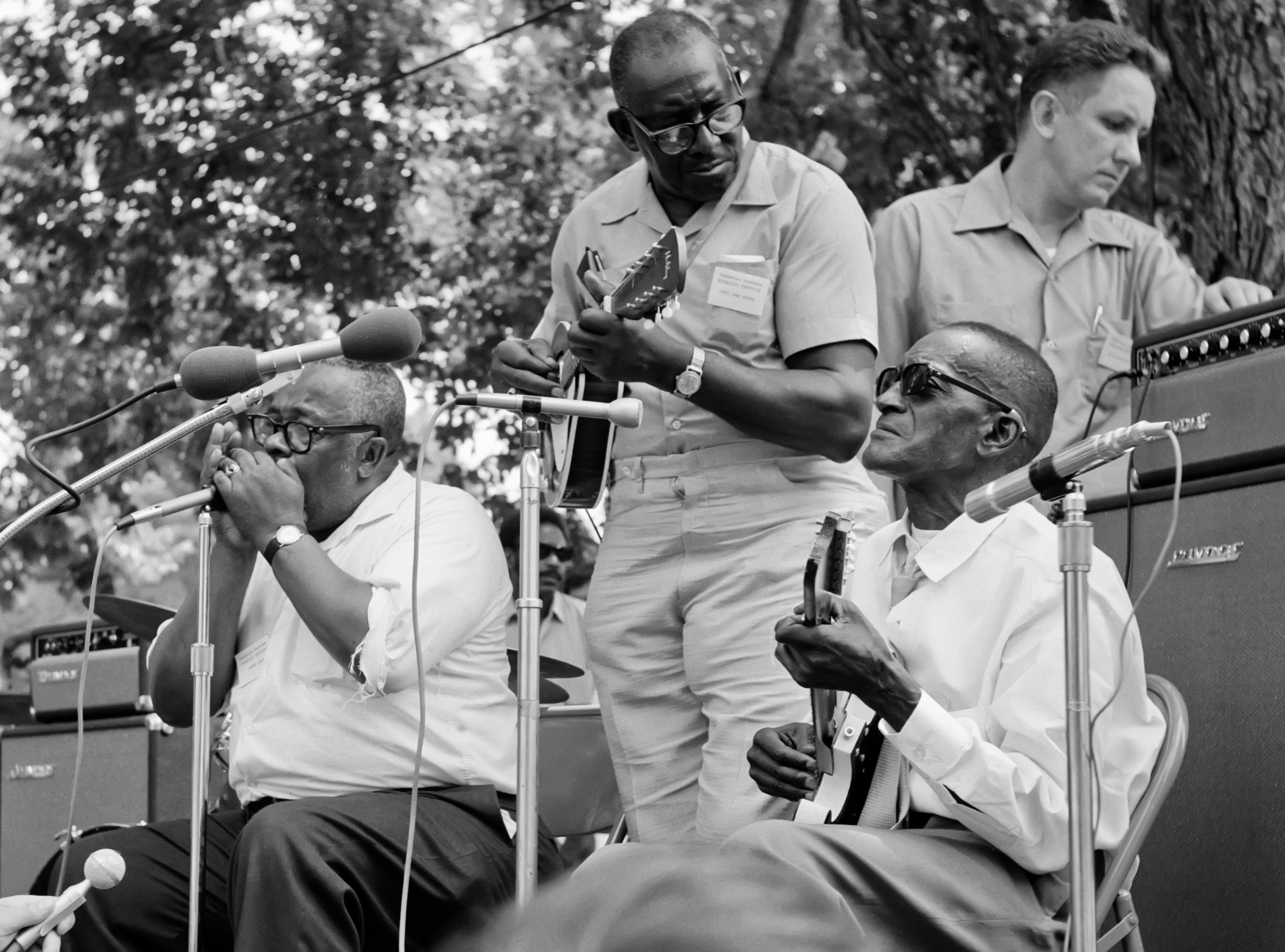
- Estes (seated, right) with Hammie Nixon and Yank Rachell, early 1970s

Background information
- Born: John Adam Estes; January 25, 1899; Ripley, Tennessee, U.S.
- Died: June 5, 1977 (aged 78) Brownsville, Tennessee, U.S.
- Genres: Country blues
- Occupations: Musician; songwriter
- Instruments: Guitar; vocals
- Years active: 1929–1977
- Label: Delmark

John Adam Estes (January 25, 1899 or 1900 – June 5, 1977), known as Sleepy John Estes, was an American blues guitarist, songwriter and vocalist. His music influenced such artists as The Beatles, Bob Dylan and Led Zeppelin.

== Life and career ==
Estes was born in Ripley, Tennessee, either in 1899 (the date on his gravestone) or 1900 (the date on his World War I draft card). In 1915, his father, a sharecropper who played guitar, moved the family to Brownsville, Tennessee. Not long after, Estes lost the sight in his right eye when a friend threw a rock at him. At the age of 19, while working as a field hand, he began to perform professionally, mostly at parties and picnics, with the accompaniment of Hammie Nixon, a harmonica player, and James "Yank" Rachell, a guitarist and mandolin player. Estes continued to work on and off with both musicians for more than fifty years. He also performed in medicine shows with Willie Newbern.

At the suggestion of Jim Jackson, Estes made his debut as a recording artist in Memphis, Tennessee, in 1929, at a session organized by Ralph Peer for Victor Records. He recorded the tracks "Drop Down Mama" and "Someday Baby Blues" with Nixon in 1935. He later worked with Son Bonds and Charlie Pickett. He went on to record for Decca Records and Bluebird Records, with his last prewar recording session taking place in 1941. He made a brief return to recording at Sun Studio in Memphis in 1952, recording "Runnin' Around" and "Rats in My Kitchen", but otherwise was out of the public eye in the 1940s and 1950s.

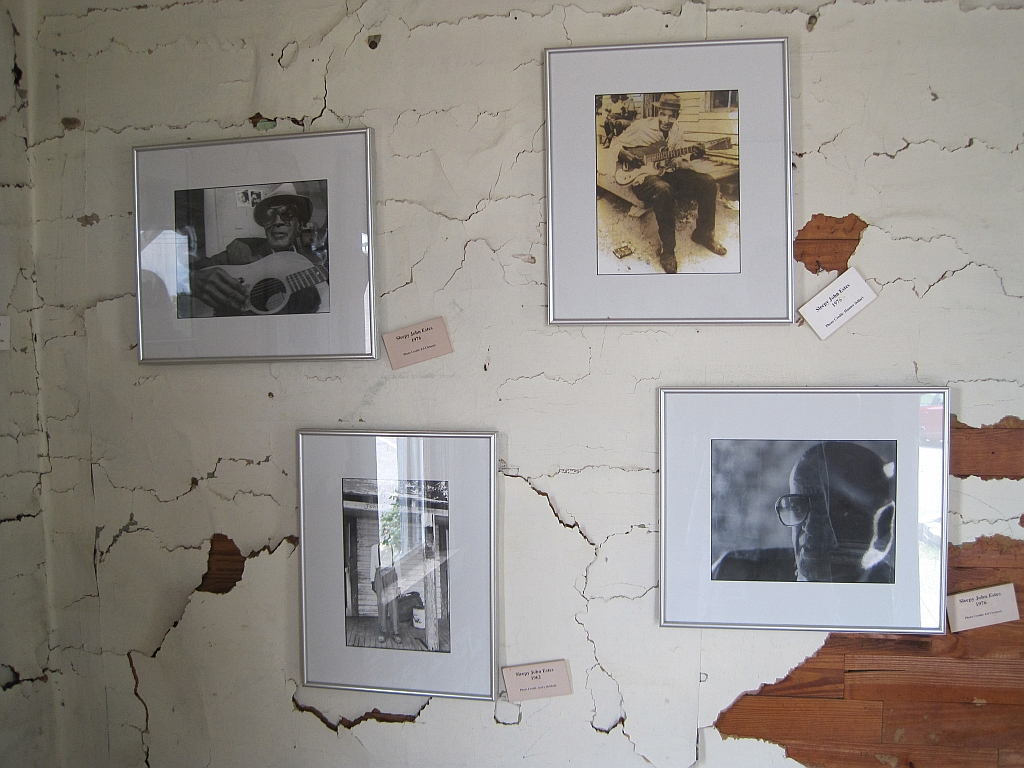
Photos at the Sleepy John Estes house at the West Tennessee Delta Heritage Center.

Estes sang with a distinctive "crying" vocal style. He frequently teamed with more capable musicians, such as Yank Rachell, Hammie Nixon, and the piano player Jab Jones. Estes sounded so much like an old man, even on his early records, that blues revivalists reportedly delayed looking for him because they assumed he would have to be long dead (and because the musician Big Bill Broonzy had written that he was dead). By the time he was tracked down by the blues historians Bob Koester and Samuel Charters in 1962, he was completely blind and living in poverty. Along with his wife, Ann, who took many of the iconic photos of Estes found in blues books and album covers, Sam Charters filmed Estes performing, sitting in front of his shack near Brownsville. Blind and frail, he became the heart and soul of the Charters' movie, "The Blues," that was not released widely until 2020, in a Document Records package titled "Searching for Secret Heroes." He resumed touring with Nixon and recording for Delmark Records. Estes, Nixon and Rachell appeared at the Newport Folk Festival in 1964.

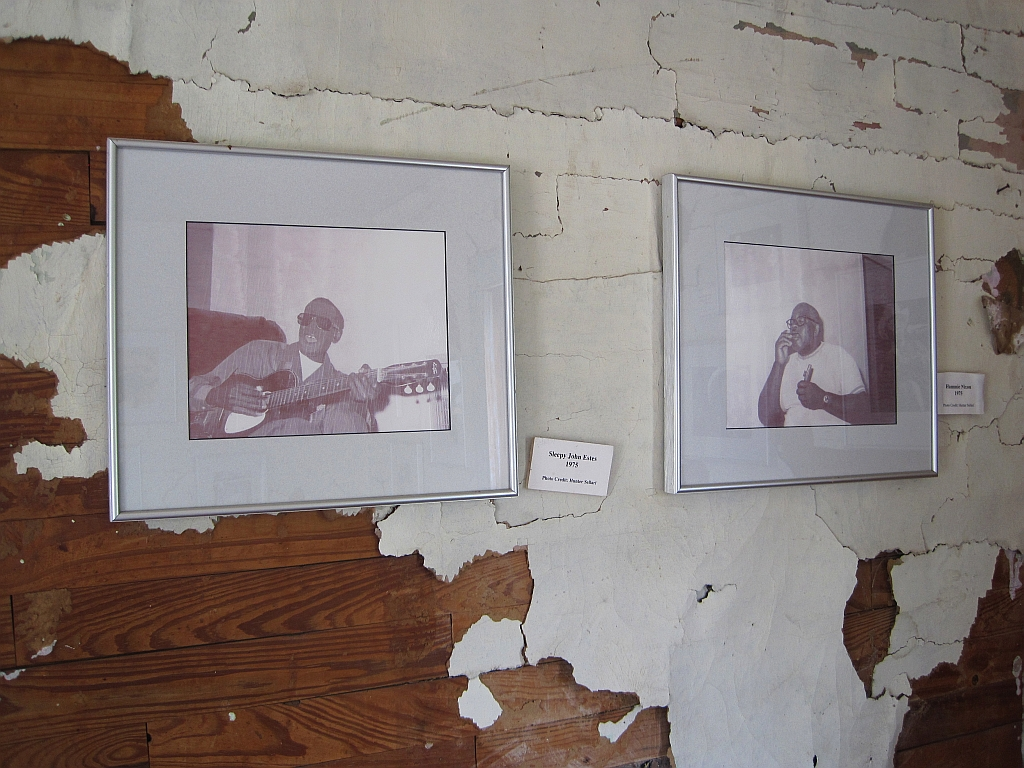
Photos at John Estes house at the Delta Heritage Center.

Many of Estes's original songs were based on events in his life or people he knew in his hometown, Brownsville, such as the local lawyer ("Lawyer Clark Blues"), the local auto mechanic ("Vassie Williams' Blues"), or an amorously inclined teenage girl ("Little Laura Blues"). In "Lawyer Clark Blues", about the lawyer and later judge and senator Hugh L. Clarke, whose family lived in Brownsville, Estes sang that Clark let him "off the hook" for an offense. He also dispensed advice on agricultural matters ("Working Man Blues") and chronicled his own attempt to reach a recording studio for a session by hopping a freight train ("Special Agent [Railroad Police Blues]"). His lyrics combined keen observation with an ability to turn an effective phrase.

Some accounts attribute the nickname Sleepy to a blood pressure disorder or narcolepsy. Bob Koester, the founder of Delmark Records, said that Estes simply had a "tendency to withdraw from his surroundings into drowsiness whenever life was too cruel or too boring to warrant full attention". Estes himself explained that the nickname was born of his exhausting life as both musician and farmer. "'Every night I was going somewhere. I'd work all day, play all night and get back home about sunrise. I'd get the mule and get right on going. I went to sleep once in the shed. I used to go to sleep so much when we were playing, they called me Sleepy. But I never missed a note.'"

== Death ==
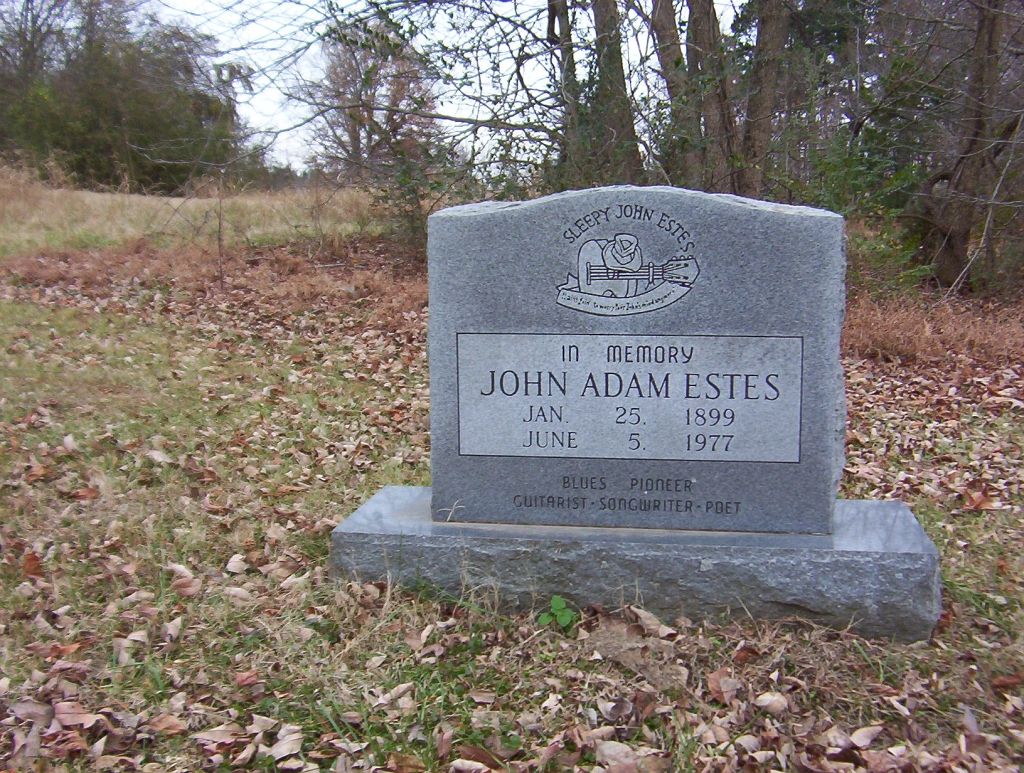
Estes's grave in Durhamville, Tennessee, 2008

Estes had a stroke while preparing for a European tour and died on June 5, 1977, at his home of 17 years in Brownsville, Haywood County, Tennessee. He is buried at Elam Baptist Church Cemetery in Durhamville, Lauderdale County, Tennessee.

His grave marker reads:

Sleepy John Estes
"..ain't goin' to worry Poor John's mind anymore"
In Memory
John Adam Estes
Jan. 25, 1899
June 5, 1977
Blues Pioneer
Guitarist – Songwriter – Poet

The epitaph "..ain't goin' to worry Poor John's mind anymore" is derived from his song "Someday Baby Blues." "I Ain't Gonna Be Worried No More" was recorded in 1935, and in his song "Drop Down Mama", also recorded in 1935, Estes referred to himself as "Poor John". His grave is located off a country road and at the far end of the cemetery, adjacent to a small grove of trees, secluded but not hidden.

In 1991, Estes was posthumously inducted into the Blues Hall of Fame.

== Legacy ==
Led Zeppelin's lead singer, Robert Plant, named Estes as one of his earliest influences. Bob Dylan mentioned Estes in the sleeve notes for his album Bringing It All Back Home (1965). Estes's song "Milk Cow Blues" is the model for Dylan's "From a Buick 6" from Highway 61 Revisited. In an interview in 1970 published in Lennon Remembers, John Lennon recalled of the Beatles' early days that "We were all listening to Sleepy John Estes and all that in art school, like everybody else."

Estes's former two-room home is on display in Brownsville, Tennessee, U.S. alongside Tina Turner's Flagg Grove School and museum.

== Recordings ==
=== Albums ===
- The Legend of Sleepy John Estes (Delmar/Delmark, 1963)
- Broke and Hungry (Ragged and Dirty, Too) (Delmark, 1964)
- Electric Sleep (Delmark, 1968)
- Brownsville Blues (Delmark, 1965)
- Down South Blues (Delmark)
- Sleepy John Estes in Europe (Delmark, 1999)

=== Compilations ===
- Sleepy John Estes, 1929–1940 (RBF Records)
- Complete Recorded Works 1929–1941, vols. 1 and 2 (Document)
- I Ain't Gonna Be Worried No More 1929–1941 (Yazoo)

== See also ==
- American Folk Blues Festival
- Anthology of American Folk Music
- Country blues
- List of blues musicians
- List of people from Tennessee
- Memphis blues
