= Pinetop Sparks =

- Also known as: Aaron Sparks
- Born: Aaron Gant; May 22, 1910; Corona, Lee County, Mississippi, U.S.
- Origin: St. Louis, Missouri, U.S.
- Died: November 5, 1935 (aged 25) St. Louis, Missouri, U.S.
- Genres: Blues
- Occupation: Pianist
- Instrument: Piano

Aaron "Pinetop" Sparks (born Aaron Gant, May 22, 1910 – November 5, 1935) was an American blues pianist active in St. Louis in the early 1930s. He and his brother, Milton “Lindberg” Sparks (born Marion Gant), recorded songs from between 1932 and 1935. Their 1935 song "Every Day I Have the Blues" has been twice inducted into the Grammy Hall of Fame for versions recorded by subsequent artists.

== Career ==
Aaron and his twin brother, Marion Gant, were born in Corona, Lee County, Mississippi, to Sullie Gant and Ruth McWhorter. They later took the surname of their stepfather, Carl Sparks. In 1920, the family moved to St. Louis, where Pinetop had "rudimentary music education at school". He and his twin brother formed a group, with Aaron playing the piano in a boogie-woogie style and Marion singing. They were accompanied by the guitarist Pete Bogans and the trombone player Ike Rogers. The boys had a sister, Jimmie Lee, who never recorded songs but, according to Henry Townsend, had a wonderful singing voice. Townsend recalled in his memoir that Pinetop played, like all other St. Louis musicians, in the "speakeasy type places", such as Nettie's on Delmar Boulevard.

Their first recording session was in 1932, when they recorded a number of blues and boogie-woogie songs including "4 x 11 = 44", "East Chicago Blues" and "Louisiana Bound". Pinetop (who got his nickname from playing Pinetop Smith's hit "Pine Top's Boogie Woogie") has been praised for "excellent technique", capable of both "fierce boogie-woogie style" and "chorded basses and rich treble passages" to accompany his brother. Pinetop also recorded "Bad Luck Blues" with Dorothea Trowbridge and "Whiskey Blues" with Elizabeth Washington, both in 1933. Most often, the brothers played together only occasionally.

Notable recordings by Pinetop include "Every Day I Have the Blues", a song he wrote with his brother, recorded on July 28, 1935, for Bluebird Records and reissued on the compilation album Windy City Blues (Nighthawk, 1992). In 1949, the song was recorded under a different title by Memphis Slim. The versions by B. B. King as well as the Joe Williams and the Count Basie Orchestra were inducted into the Grammy Hall of Fame.

== Death ==
There were rumors that the brothers did not always get along and did not have steady employment. They also frequently had run-ins with the law. Pinetop drank heavily, and Marion killed a man (in self-defense), for which he spent time in the workhouse in 1937. Pinetop died, apparently of poisoning, in 1935. Townsend, however, claims that Pinetop was in the habit of never saying no to a gig; playing all throughout the weekend and consequently working 24 hours without sleep. It was these work habits, combined with heavy drinking (to stay awake) that led to Pinetop's death. "He just done burned himself out", according to Townsend. His brother also cited exhaustion as the cause.

Pinetop Sparks' grave went unmarked for nearly eight decades, before a fan club finally honored him. In 2013, 78 years after Sparks' death, thanks to the work of a non-profit organization, the Killer Blues Headstone Project, a headstone was laid at Father Dickson Cemetery in Crestwood, Missouri, a historically black cemetery in St. Louis. A keyboard adorned the lower casing of the stone, with his name, dates of birth and death, and the epitaph "Every Day I Have the Blues".
