= Polka Dot Slim =

Willie Monroe Vincent (December 9, 1926 – June 22, 1981), who used the stage name Polka Dot Slim and was also credited as Vince Monroe, Mr. Calhoun, and Poka-A-Dot Slim, was an American blues singer and harmonica player.

== Biography ==
Born in Woodville, Mississippi, United States, he performed as a singer and harmonica player from his youth, in a style that combined New Orleans rhythm and blues with elements drawn from Sonny Boy Williamson II (Rice Miller). His first recordings were made in the late 1950s in Crowley, Louisiana, for Jay Miller, who released them under two different pseudonyms on two different labels. In 1964, he recorded "A Thing You Gotta Face" and "Ain't Broke Ain't Hungry", produced by Sax Kari and released as a single on the Instant label.

Polka Dot Slim was a regular performer for many years in clubs and bars in New Orleans. Researcher John Broven described him in the 1970s as one of "the last of the rural country bluesmen still playing in New Orleans", along with Boogie Bill Webb and Babe Stovall. Polka Dot Slim later moved to Oakland, California, where he died in 1981.
