= Reverend Freakchild =

American singer-songwriter

- Also known as: Fordham; Bhoomi Sparsha; Sal Paradise; Floyd Graves; Fleetwood
- Origin: Hawaii
- Genres: blues, country blues, psychedelic blues, folk, country music
- Instruments: Vocals, guitar, harmonica
- Years active: 2001–present
- Labels: Treated and Released Records

Reverend Freakchild is an international recording artist, known for writing and performing a distinct style of the blues incorporating elements of psychedelic music, country music, and the blues.

== History ==
Reverend Freakchild grew up in the US state of Hawaii and was exposed to music at an early age, as his mother was a classical pianist and his father loved blues music. He attended Northeastern University in Boston, where he earned a degree in philosophy and religion, but decided to pursue music full-time.

Freakchild played in an early version of the alternative rock band Soul Coughing. Afterwards, while in Boston, he formed the roots rock jam band Bananafish. Other musical groups Reverend Freakchild has performed with include the Neptune Ensemble, the Soul Miners, the Lucky Devils, and the Cosmic All-Stars. He also has been a featured soloist and member of the Metro Mass Gospel Choir, with which he has performed at major Manhattan venues including Carnegie Hall, Avery Fisher Hall at Lincoln Center, and the Town Hall.

The Rev made a Buddhist pilgrimage to India in 2012 with Zen master Bernie Glassman.

== Recordings ==
Reverend Freakchild released his first full-length album, Blues & Spirituals, in 2001, and released his second album, Hymn Hustler, in February 2003. In 2004, Freakchild released a collection of songs with the Cosmic All-Stars called Time Passes Strangely.

In 2010, Freakchild released God Shaped Hole. The album was generally well received by critics, with reviewer Ivan Nossa stating that the album is "like a garden with many flowers and every flower has its own beautiful color." Critic Mike Wood noted that Freakchild "holds genuine gold in his heart, and when he listens to his muse fully, "God Shaped Hole" is compelling and raw..."

In 2013, Chaos and Country Blues was released. According to Freakchild, the album consists of "the stripped down blues sounds of love and death songs." The liner notes include a mock obituary of Freakchild written by Jon Sobel. Hillbilly Zen-Punk Blues followed in 2015; Blues Blast Magazine stated "what of his music? Like Zen Buddhism, it's contemplative and esoteric, meant to empty one's mind of worries and fears and fill it with peace."

Illogical Optimism was a 3-disc deluxe set released in 2016. Living Blues said about the album – "Reverend Freakchild is anything but reverent, rendering his unpredictable yet loving meld of blues, rock, and roots music with gusto."

Preachin' Blues followed in 2017, reaching No. 24 on the Living Blues Charts for January 2017. Of Preaching Blues, Living Blues noted "Freakchild grounds his singing and playing in an informed understanding of the blues and of the spirit while interjecting his own worldview of how human beings should live." In 2018, Freakchild released Dial It In to praise by Elmore Magazine – "they all get the body and soul moving—and smiling, since there's a fair dose of humor in the songs, plus a spiritual bent, whether spiritual/gospel or spiritual/psychedelic." No Depression notes "when I want something fresh, progressive, experimental yet still full of the Blues I will reach out for Reverend Freakchild and friends." This album featured the single "Dial It In!" with G. Love, Hugh Pool, and Hazel Miller.

Freakchild's next release – 2019's Road Dog Dharma – was a collection of radio interviews and travel songs from around the USA. This was followed in 2020 by The Bodhisattva Blues, featuring Melvin Seals, Mark Karan, Robin Sylvester, Jay Collins, Hugh Pool, and Chris Parker. "Spiritually positive songs, faithful covers, great choice of players!!" – David Gans, author and radio host (The Grateful Dead Hour).

His 13th release was a 13-song collection Supramundane Blues which also included a bonus disc of a Psychedelic Trip-Hop Mass. In 2022 the Rev released a collection of full band version of nine all original songs entitled, Songs of Beauty for Ashes of Realization. And in 2023 he released a follow up solo acoustic album of versions of the same original songs. To which Blues Blast Magazine proclaimed that, “Freakchild clearly shows himself to be a masterful troubadour on this album. Bare Bones displays exceptional storytelling and capable guitar playing, all fused with a unique spiritual perspective."

A Bluesman of Sorts, a collection of 19 Blues tunes released in 2025 was aptly explained by Living Blues Magazine, “ Oddly enough, he's written his own obituaries not once, but twice, and yet keeps making music of decidedly varied descriptions, all based in the blues. He refers to this latest effort - part compilation, part greatest hits—as a "posthumous retrospective collection," serving to stir the pot even further while adding confusion and curiosity to the equation all at the same time.”

== Personal life ==
In an interview, Freakchild mentioned that he is a Buddhist but that he also considers music to be his religion. Freakchild states that the blues and Buddhism can both be seen as ways of confronting reality and the truth of human suffering. He also holds a Master of Divinity Degree from Naropa University (2020).

== Discography ==
Title	Album details
Blues & Spirituals	Released: 21 April 2001; Label: Treated and Released Records
Hymn Hustler	Released: 4 February 2003; Label: Treated and Released Records
Time Passes Strangely (EP)	Released with the Cosmic All-Stars; Released: 28 September 2004; Label: Treated and Released Records
God Shaped Hole	Released: 21 August 2010; Label: Treated and Released Records
Chaos And Country Blues	Released: 1 January 2013; Label: Treated and Released Records
Hillbilly Zen-Punk Blues	Released: 8 April 2015; Label: Treated and Released Records
Illogical Optimism	Released: 1 June 2016; Label: Treated and Released Records
Preachin' Blues	Released: 1 January 2017; Label: Treated and Released Records
Dial It In	Released: 17 March 2018; Label: Floating Records
Road Dog Dharma	Released: 21 April 2019; Label: Treated and Released Records
The Bodhisattva Blues	Released: 10 April 2020; Label: Treated and Released Records
Supramundane Blues	Released: 26 March 2021; Label: Treated and Released Records
Songs Of Beauty For Ashes Of Realization	Released: 14 July 2023; Label: Treated and Released Records
Bare Bones	Released: 21 June 2024; Label: Treated and Released Records
A Bluesman of Sorts	Released: 28 April 2025; Label: Treated and Released Records
Blues & Spirituals / Hymn Hustler	Released: 1 May 2026; Label: Treated and Released Records
