= Teddy Darby =

American blues singer (1906–1975)

- Also known as: Blind Blues Darby; Blind Squire Turner; Blind Darby
- Born: Theodore Roosevelt Darby; March 12, 1906; Henderson, Kentucky, U.S.
- Died: December 1975 (aged 69) East St. Louis, Illinois, U.S.
- Genres: Blues
- Occupations: Musician; Preacher
- Instruments: Vocal; Guitar
- Years active: 1926 - 1937

Theodore Roosevelt Darby, better known as Blind Teddy Darby (March 2, 1906 – December 1975), was an American blues singer and guitarist.

Darby was born in Henderson, Kentucky. He moved to St. Louis with his family when he was a child. His mother taught him to play the guitar. He served some time for selling moonshine. In 1926, he lost his eyesight because of glaucoma.

He recorded from 1929 until 1937, under the names Blind Teddy Darby, Blind Darby, Blind Blues Darby and Blind Squire Turner for Paramount, Victor, Bluebird, Vocalion and Decca. In 1960 he was "rediscovered" and recorded by Pete Welding of Testament Records, but the recordings from this session were never released.

Darby was a friend of the blues musician Peetie Wheatstraw. On December 21, 1941, Wheatstraw's 39th birthday, Darby was invited to go for a drive with Wheatstraw and two others, but Darby's wife objected, and he declined the invitation. Wheatstraw and his two companions were killed when their car struck a standing freight train.

In the late 1930s, he gave up the blues and became an ordained deacon.

His song, "Built Right on the Ground", has been covered (under the title of "I Never Cried"), from the 1970s onwards, by John Miller (who first changed the title), Roy Book Binder, Howard Bursen, and Phil Heywood.

Teddy Darby died in December 1975. In 2019 the Killer Blues Headstone Project placed the headstone for Darby at Sunset Gardens at Stookey Township, St. Clair County, Illinois.

== Compilations ==
- St. Louis Country Blues (Earl Archives, 1984)
- Bootleggin' Ain't Good No More (Blue Planet, 1993)
- Complete Recorded Works In Chronological Order (Document, 1993)
