= The Mississippi Moaner =

American country blues singer and guitarist

- Born: Isaiah Nettles c. 1912; Hermanville, Mississippi, U.S.
- Died: Unknown
- Genres: Country blues
- Occupation: Musician
- Instruments: Vocal; guitar
- Years active: 1930s–1960s

Isaiah Nettles (c. 1912 – unknown), known by his recording alias The Mississippi Moaner, was an American country blues singer and guitarist. Accurate information about Nettles is sparse but he is best remembered for his recording session in 1935, which was conducted during an era when the output of blues music drastically declined.

Nettles was active around a train station in Rockport, Mississippi, a small town 20 miles southeast of Crystal Springs, when he was discovered by talent scout H. C. Speir. Although local residents could not recall Nettles when queried in the 1960s, he surely hailed from a community close to Rockport, according to blues historian Gayle Dean Wardlow, and appealed to listeners by tap dancing barefoot as he played. In October 1935, Nettles participated at a recording session located in the second floor of a building near Speir's Farish Street Music Store in Jackson, Mississippi. Robert Wilkins and Will Shade also performed during the same studio session, all supervised Speir, Art Satherley, and W. R. Calloway. Nettles recorded as "The Mississippi Moaner", an alias most likely bestowed upon him by Satherly.

Four songs resulted from the session but only two, "Mississippi Moan" and "It's Cold in China Blues", were distributed on Vocalion Records; Blind Lemon Jefferson's influence on the songs were highly apparent to writer Paul Oliver. "Unfortunately", wrote Wardlow, Nettles never recorded again but his "forceful brand of dance music" was a highlight of an era that saw blues recordings significantly decline. Nettles may have served during the Second World War and later lived in Mount Olive and Taylorsville. He was last heard of when he planned to move, remarking he was going "up north".
