= Peetie Wheatstraw =

American blues musician (1902–1941)

- The only known photograph of Wheatstraw, c. 1930s

Background information
- Born: William Bunch; December 21, 1902; Ripley, Tennessee, U.S.
- Died: December 21, 1941 (aged 39) East St. Louis, Illinois, U.S.
- Genre: St. Louis blues
- Occupation: Musician
- Instruments: Piano; vocals; guitar
- Years active: 1930–1941
- Labels: Vocalion; Decca; Conqueror

William Bunch (December 21, 1902 – December 21, 1941), known as Peetie Wheatstraw, was an American musician, an influential figure among 1930s blues singers.

== Early life and career ==
William Bunch was born in Ripley, Tennessee, in 1902, the son of James Bunch and Mary (Burns) Bunch. There is some speculation Wheatstraw may have been born in Cotton Plant, Arkansas, where he was buried, and blues musician Big Joe Williams stated that this was his hometown.

The earliest biographical facts come from the musicians Henry Townsend and Teddy Darby, who remember Wheatstraw moving to East St. Louis, Illinois, in the late 1920s. He was already a proficient guitarist but a limited pianist. The only known photograph of him shows him holding a National brand tricone resonator guitar, but he played the piano on most of his recordings. He often performed at a club called Lovejoy in the East St. Louis area and at a juke joint over a barbershop on West Biddle Street. By the time Sunnyland Slim moved to St. Louis in the early 1930s, Wheatstraw was one of the most popular singers there, with an admired idiosyncratic piano style.

Wheatstraw began recording in 1930 and was so popular that he continued to record through the Great Depression, when the number of blues records issued was drastically reduced. The blues musician Charlie Jordan introduced Wheatstraw to recording, setting him up with both Vocalion Records and Decca Records. He recorded "Tennessee Peaches Blues" in a duet with an artist called Neckbones, in August 1930. Following this first recording, Wheatstraw was especially prolific, recording 21 songs in two years, including solos like "Don't Feel Welcome Blues," "Strange Man Blues," "School Days," and "So Soon". He made no records between March 1932 and March 1934, a period in which he perfected his mature style.

For the rest of his life, he was one of the most recorded blues singers and accompanists. His total output of 161 recorded songs was surpassed by only four prewar blues artists: Tampa Red, Big Bill Broonzy, Lonnie Johnson and Bumble Bee Slim (Amos Easton). In the clubs of St. Louis and East St. Louis his popularity was outstanding, rivalled only by that of Walter Davis. Despite references to his touring, there is little evidence that he worked outside these cities, except to make records.

== Persona ==
By the time Bunch reached St. Louis, he had discarded his name and crafted a new identity. The name "Peetie Wheatstraw" was described by the blues scholar Paul Oliver as one that had well-rooted folk associations. Later writers have repeated this, while reporting that many uses of the name were copied from Bunch. Elijah Wald suggested that Bunch may have been the sole source of all uses of the name.

All but two of his records were issued under the names "Peetie Wheatstraw, the Devil's Son-in-Law" and "Peetie Wheatstraw, the High Sheriff from Hell". He composed several "stomps" with lyrics projecting a boastful demonic persona to match these sobriquets. His hardened attitude and egotism have given contemporary authors grounds for comparing him to modern-day rap artists. There is some evidence that the writer Ralph Ellison knew him; Ellison used the name "Peetie Wheatstraw" and aspects of the musician's demonic persona (but no biographical facts) for a character in his novel Invisible Man.

African-American music maintains the tradition of the African "praise song", which tells of the prowess (sexual and other) of the singer. First-person celebrations of the self provide the impetus for many of Wheatstraw's songs, and he sang changes on this theme with confidence, humour and occasional menace. The blues singer Henry Townsend recalled that Wheatstraw's real personality was similar: "He was that kind of person. You know, a jive-type person." The blues critic Tony Russell updated the description: "Wheatstraw constructed a macho persona that made him the spiritual ancestor of rap artists."

== Discography ==
Wheatstraw recorded 161 sides on 78-RPM records for 1930 to the end of 1941. A compilation LP album was released by Flyright Records in 1975. Twenty-five years later a second volume was put together by Old Tramp Records. In 1994, Wheatstraw's complete recordings were issued on seven CDs by Document Records.

Peetie Wheatstraw: Complete Recorded Works in Chronological Order:

- Vol. 1, 1930–1932, Document Records DOCD-5241
- Vol. 2, 25 March 1934 to 17 July 1935, Document Records DOCD-5242
- Vol. 3, 17 July 1935 to 20 February 1936, Document Records DOCD-5243
- Vol. 4, 20 February 1936 to 26 March 1937, Document Records DOCD-5244
- Vol. 5, 26 March 1937 to 18 October 1938, Document Records DOCD-5245
- Vol. 6, 18 October 1938 to 4 April 1940, Document Records DOCD-5246
- Vol. 7, 4 April 1940 to 25 November 1941, Document Records DOCD-5247

== Style ==
Wheatstraw operated in a community of musicians in St. Louis and East St. Louis who knew and performed with each other. He was also a recording star subject to the demands of record producers and the challenges of other stars. These forces created a consistency in his instrumental styles, which later critics have found uninteresting. Samuel Charters, in The Country Blues, dismissed Wheatstraw and other recording stars of the period as tending to "a repetitious use of clichés and a monotonous accompaniment that was as unimaginative as their singing". Tony Russell, while much more appreciative, warned that "anybody listening to long stretches of his recordings is likely to go stir-crazy".

Against this generic style Wheatstraw had some instantly recognizable characteristics. Most of the records on which he played piano, including his accompaniments of other singers, begin with the same eight-bar introduction. Much more distinctive was his vocal style, often described as "lazy" because of his loose articulation, but better represented by Tony Russell as "gruff" and "clogged". Most distinctive of all was his strangled semi-falsetto cry "Ooh, well, well" (with variations) interjected in the break of the third line of a blues verse. According to Teddy Darby, one woman listener exclaimed, "Good God, why doesn't that man yodel and be done with it?"

What distinguished Wheatstraw's recordings most of all is the quality of his lyrics. Like other successful performers, he sang of the concerns of urban African Americans removed from their rural roots. Some of his most memorable songs deal with the repeal of Prohibition, a New Deal WPA project, and slum clearance for urban renewal. He first entered the Vocalion Records studios on August 13, 1930, and recorded a handful of songs, including "Four o'Clock in the Morning" and "Tennessee Peaches Blues". Over the following decade, he recorded over 160 sides for Vocalion, Decca Records and Bluebird Records.

Wheatstraw was known for his laid-back approach and adept singing and songwriting. His instrumental talents were average at best. His songs appealed to working-class minorities, because of their content—he often wrote about social issues such as unemployment and public assistance. There were also pieces about the immoral ways of loose women and, true to his own self-publicity, death and the supernatural. Almost all of his songs included his trademark "Ooh, well well", usually accentuated in the third verse. On his records Wheatstraw occasionally played the guitar, but he usually played the piano, accompanied by a guitarist; among his collaborators were the guitarists Kokomo Arnold, Lonnie Johnson, Charley Jordan, Papa Charlie McCoy and Teddy Bunn and the pianist Champion Jack Dupree. On some of his last dates, Wheatstraw recorded music in a jazz-inspired framework, collaborating with Lil Hardin Armstrong and the trumpeter Jonah Jones.

== Influence ==
Wheatstraw's influence was enormous in the 1930s. Perhaps the most obvious example of his impact is in the lyrics and vocal stylings of Robert Johnson, often considered the most important blues figure of the era. Many of Johnson's recordings were reworkings of songs by other popular artists of the time, and he drew heavily from Wheatstraw's repertoire. For example, Wheatstraw's "Police Station Blues" forms the basis for Johnson's "Terraplane Blues". His nickname "Devil's Son-in-Law" also resonated with Johnson's similar image.

Wheatstraw, along with Leroy Carr, was one of the earliest blues singers who played the piano. Elements of his style can be seen in later artists, like Champion Jack Dupree, Moon Mullican and Jerry Lee Lewis. He also made many recordings with the influential Kokomo Arnold, who wrote the blues standard "Milk Cow Blues".

The Rudy Ray Moore film Petey Wheatstraw is about an entertainer who promises to marry the Devil's daughter, making him "Devil’s son-in-law" like one of Wheatstraws's hit songs.

== Death ==
Wheatstraw was riding the crest of his success at the time of his premature death. The songs "Mister Livingood" and "Bring Me Flowers While I'm Living" were his last known recordings, from his final recording session, on November 25, 1941. On December 21, 1941, his 39th birthday, he and some friends decided to take a drive to find some more liquor. They tried to entice Wheatstraw's friend, the blues singer Teddy Darby, to come with them, but Darby's wife refused to let him. Wheatstraw got into the car with Big Joe Williams and two other friends, one of whom was driving. Luckily for him, Williams asked to be dropped off downtown to catch a streetcar to his home in St. Louis. Traveling at a high speed just a block from Wheatstraw's house, the Buick they were riding in struck a standing freight train, throwing all three men from the car. Wheatstraw's two companions were killed instantly, and he died of head injuries in the hospital five hours later. There is a legend that his death drew little attention, but the accident was fully reported in St. Louis and East St. Louis newspapers, and obituaries appeared in the national music press. Down Beat led the front page of its issue of January 15, 1942, with the story of the accident and published an appreciation of Wheatstraw's career under the headline "Blues Shouter Killed After Waxing 'Hearseman Blues'". Wheatstraw was buried in Crowder Cemetery, near Cotton Plant, Arkansas.
