= James "Stump" Johnson =

- Cover of "The Duck's Yas-Yas-Yas"

Background information
- Also known as: Shorty George, Snitcher Roberts
- Born: January 17, 1902; Clarksville, Tennessee, United States
- Died: December 5, 1969 (aged 67) St. Louis, Missouri, United States
- Genres: St. Louis blues
- Occupations: Musician, singer
- Instruments: Vocals, piano
- Labels: QRS, Bluebird, Paramount

James "Stump" Johnson (January 17, 1902 – December 5, 1969) was an American blues pianist and singer from St. Louis.

== Biography ==
James "Stump" Johnson was the brother of Jesse Johnson, "a prominent black business man," who around 1909 had moved the family from Clarksville, Tennessee, to St. Louis, where he ran a music store and was a promoter. James, a self-taught piano player, made a career playing the city's brothels. He had an instant hit with the "whorehouse tune" "The Duck's Yas-Yas-Yas", "a popular St. Louis party song". The song's title is from the lyric "Shake your shoulders, shake 'em fast, if you can't shake your shoulders, shake your yas-yas-yas."

He made a number of other recordings (some mildly pornographic) under various pseudonyms. These included Shorty George and Snitcher Roberts. One of the more obscene songs was a version of "Steady Grinding", which he recorded with Dorothea Trowbridge on August 2, 1933; the song has the "defiant, sexually aggressive lyrics" early blueswomen were noted for, grinding being slang for sexual intercourse.

Johnson died on December 5, 1969, from the effects of esophageal cancer at the Veteran's Hospital in St. Louis. He was 67 years old.

== Discography ==
=== James "Stump" Johnson (1929–1964) ===
James "Stump" Johnson (1929–1964)

Compilation album by James "Stump" Johnson
- Recorded: 1929–1964
- Genre: St. Louis blues
- Label: Document

Complete Recorded Works in Chronological Order, Document DOCD-5250, CD

1. "The Duck's Yas-Yas-Yas"
2. "The Snitcher's Blues"
3. "Bound to Be a Monkey"
4. "My Babe Blues"
5. "Jones Law Blues"
6. "Transom Blues (Bury That Thing)"
7. "Soaking Wet Blues"
8. "Kind Babe Blues"
9. "What You Do What I Asked You To"
10. "Heart Is Right Blues"
11. "Low Moanin' Blue"
12. "Snitcher's Blues"
13. "Baby B. Blues"
14. "You Buzzard You"
15. "Sail on Black Sue"
16. "Barrel of Whiskey Blues"
17. "Steady Grindin'"
18. "Money Johnson"
19. "Don't Give My Lard Away"
20. "Snitcher's Blues No. 2"
21. "Bound to Be a Monkey"
22. "Duck Yas-Yas-Yas"

=== The Duck's Yas-Yas-Yas ===
Compilation/reissue, Agram Blues AB-2007, LP

==== Side A ====
1. "The Duck's Yas-Yas-Yas"
2. "The Snitchers Blues"
3. "My Babe Blues"
4. "My Babe Blues"
5. "Transom Blues (Bury That Thing)"
6. "Soaking Wet Blues"
7. "Kind Babe Blues"
8. "Would You Do What I Asked You To"

==== Side B ====
1. "The Duck's Yas-Yas-Yas"
2. "Heart Is Right Blues"
3. "Snitcher's Blues"
4. "You Buzzard You"
5. "Sail on Black Sue"
6. "Money Johnson"
7. "Snitchers Blues"
8. "The Duck's Yas-Yas-Yas"
9. "The Duck's Yas-Yas-Yas"
10. "Snitchers Blues"
