= Bogus Ben Covington =

- Also known as: Blind Ben Covington probably Ben Curry possible Memphis Ben
- Born: possibly Benjamin Curry possibly April 19, 1890 possibly Yalobusha County, Mississippi, U.S.
- Died: possibly c. 1935
- Genres: Country blues
- Occupation: Musician
- Instruments: Vocal; Mandolin-Banjo; Guitar; Harmonica

"Bogus" Ben Covington (born Benjamin Curry possibly April 19, 1890 – around 1935) was an American country blues singer, harpist, and mandolin-banjo player. Originally a resident of Louisiana, Covington was active in Mississippi and recorded in the late-1920s and 1930s, presumably under various names such as Blind Ben Covington, Ben Curry, and Memphis Ben. He also occasionally performed alongside Big Joe Williams, King Solomon Hill, and Speckled Red.

== Biography ==
According to blues historian Gayle Dean Wardlow, Covington was originally from the town of Arcadia in northern Louisiana. Covington, born Benjamin Curry, was possibly the same Curry who was drafted during the First World War; his birth date is listed as April 19, 1890 in Yalobusha County, Mississippi. Whatever the case, Covington moved to Birmingham, Alabama in the mid-1920s, but traveled frequently to Mississippi and Chicago to perform on street corners. Big Joe Williams remembered Covington: he described him as "bogus blind", hence Covington's nickname, for pretending to be blind to earn more money while playing on the streets. The two musicians were still playing together as late as 1933 at the Century of Progress Expo in Chicago.

Blues experts Kip Lornell and David Evans are in agreement that Covington is the same musician who recorded under the aliases Ben Curry and Memphis Ben. The researchers based their conclusions on the similar playing styles and the selected material. Another blues writer, Paul Oliver also determined Covington was the same Ben Curry who recorded a cover version of Speckled Red's song "The Dirty Dozen". For recording sessions, Covington played a mandolin-banjo and also provided accompaniment on the harmonica.

In September 1928, Covington traveled to Chicago to record under the moniker "Bogus" Ben Covington for Paramount Records. If he is indeed Memphis Ben, Covington entered Vocalion Records' studio in Memphis on November 28 to complete two unissued sides. The Memphis Ben alias may have been devised by Harry Charles, a talent scout who sometimes gave blues musicians different names to avoid contract disputes. In October 1929, Covington recorded again for Vocalion, this time with the alias Blind Ben Covington. After a two-year recording drought, he was rediscovered by Paramount Records. He was invited to a session, with him credited as Ben Curry, and which included Marshall Owens, the Famous Bluejay Singers of Birmingham, and King Solomon Hill, the latter an old friend of Covington's.

Not much is known about Covington after his final recording session. He is believed to have moved to Pennsylvania, where he died in around 1935.

== See also ==
- Blind musicians
