= Jazz Gillum =

American blues harmonica player

- Born: William McKinley Gillum; September 11, 1904; Indianola, Mississippi, U.S.
- Died: March 29, 1966 (aged 61) Chicago, Illinois, U.S.
- Genre: Chicago blues
- Occupation: Musician
- Instruments: Harmonica, vocals
- Years active: 1923–1961
- Labels: ARC, Bluebird, Folkways

William McKinley "Jazz" Gillum (September 11, 1902 or 1904 – March 29, 1966) was an American Chicago blues harmonica player and singer.

== Biography ==
Gillum's grave at Restvale Cemetery

Gillum was born in Indianola, Mississippi. He ran away from home at age seven and for the next few years lived in Charleston, Mississippi, working and playing for tips on street corners. He moved to Chicago in 1923, where he met the guitarist Big Bill Broonzy. The duo started working at nightclubs around the city. By 1934 Gillum was recording for ARC Records and Bluebird Records.

Gillum's recordings, under his own name and as a sideman, were included on many of the highly popular "Bluebird beat" recordings produced by Lester Melrose in the 1930s and 1940s. In 1940, he recorded "Key to the Highway" (featuring Broonzy on guitar), utilizing the now-standard melody and eight-bar blues arrangement. The song had first been recorded a few months earlier by Charlie Segar, with a different melody and a 12-bar blues arrangement. Gillum's styling of the song was copied by Broonzy a few months later, and his version became the standard arrangement of this now-classic blues track.

Gillum's records were some of the earliest featuring blues with electric guitar accompaniment, when the 16-year-old jazz guitarist George Barnes played on several songs on Gillum's 1938 session that produced "Reefer Headed Woman" and others.

He joined the United States Army in 1942 and served until 1945.

Gillum recorded an early version of "Look on Yonder Wall" (1946) with Big Maceo on piano, which was later popularized by Elmore James.

After the Bluebird label folded in the late 1940s, he made few recordings. His last recordings were on a couple of 1961 albums with Memphis Slim and the singer and guitarist Arbee Stidham, for Folkways Records.

On March 29, 1966, Gillum was shot in the head during a street argument and was pronounced dead on arrival at Garfield Park Hospital, in Chicago. He is buried at Restvale Cemetery, in Alsip, Illinois.

== See also ==
- List of blues musicians
- List of Chicago blues musicians
- List of country blues musicians
- List of harmonicists
