= Boogie Bill Webb =

American singer (1924–1990)

- Born: March 24, 1924; Jackson, Mississippi, United States
- Died: August 22, 1990 (aged 66) New Orleans, Louisiana, United States
- Genres: Louisiana blues, R&B, country blues, electric blues
- Occupations: Guitarist, singer, songwriter
- Instruments: Guitar, vocals
- Years active: 1947–1990
- Labels: Imperial, Flying Fish

Boogie Bill Webb (March 24, 1924 – August 22, 1990) was an American Louisiana blues and rhythm-and-blues guitarist, singer and songwriter. His music combined Mississippi country blues with New Orleans R&B. His best-known recordings are "Bad Dog" and "Drinkin' and Stinkin'". Despite a lengthy (albeit intermittent) career, Webb released only one album.

== Biography ==
Webb was born in Jackson, Mississippi. His got his first guitar at the age of eight, made from a cigar box and strung with screen wire. His greatest influence was Tommy Johnson. With a real guitar obtained when he was a teenager, he won a talent show in 1947. He subsequently appeared briefly in the musical film The Jackson Jive. He moved to New Orleans in 1952.

In New Orleans Webb became friends with Fats Domino and was thus introduced to Dave Bartholomew and obtained a recording contract with Imperial Records, for which Domino and Bartholomew recorded. In 1953 Webb released his debut single, "Bad Dog," a noncommercial slice of country boogie-woogie. Frustrated by lack of recognition, Webb relocated to Chicago, where he worked in factories. There he met and played with Muddy Waters, John Lee Hooker, Jimmy Reed, and Chuck Berry.

Webb returned to New Orleans in 1959 to work as a stevedore, performing music infrequently. However, in 1968 he recorded several songs for the folklorist David Evans, which eventually appeared on the Arhoolie Records album Roosevelt Holts and His Friends. The 1972 compilation album The Legacy of Tommy Johnson contains five tracks recorded by Webb.

Exposure at home and in Europe led to visits to Webb from blues fans and invitations to tour. In 1982 he appeared at the Utrecht Festival, in the Netherlands. In 1989, with financial assistance from the Louisiana Endowment for the Humanities, he released the album Drinkin' and Stinkin'. An encounter with three women who had been out drinking for three days without bathing inspired the lyrics of the title track.

Webb died in New Orleans in August 1990, at the age of 66.

== Discography ==
=== Albums ===
- Drinkin' and Stinkin' (1989, Flying Fish Records)

=== Compilation albums ===
- Rural Blues, vol. 2, Saturday Night Function, various artists (1968, Imperial Records)
- Rural Blues, vol. 3, Down Home Stomp, various artists (1968, Imperial Records)
- The Blues of Snooks Eaglin & Boogie Bill Webb (2004)
- The Blues of Robert Lockwood Jr. & Boogie Bill Webb (2004, Storyville Records)

== Filmography ==
=== Films ===
- The Jackson Jive (1947)

=== DVDs ===
- Blues of Boogie Bill Webb (2002, Storyville)

== See also ==
- List of electric blues musicians
- List of Louisiana blues musicians
- List of people from Mississippi
