= Yank Rachell =

American country blues musician (1910–1997)

- Rachell performing in Hamburg, Germany, February 1978

Background information
- Born: James A. Rachel; March 16, 1910 near Brownsville, Tennessee, U.S.
- Died: April 9, 1997 (aged 87) Indianapolis, Indiana, U.S.
- Genres: Country blues
- Instruments: Mandolin; guitar
- Years active: 1929–1997

Yank Rachell (born James A. Rachel; March 16, 1910 – April 9, 1997) was an American country blues musician who has been called an "elder statesman of the blues". His career as a performer spanned nearly seventy years, from the late 1920s to the 1990s.

== Career ==
Rachell grew up in Brownsville, Tennessee. His gravestone marks his birth year as 1920. However, researchers Bob Eagle and Eric LeBlanc conclude, on the basis of a 1920 census entry, that Rachell was probably born in 1903.

In 1958, during the American folk music revival, he moved to Indianapolis. He recorded for Delmark Records and Blue Goose Records. He was a capable guitarist and singer but was better known as a master of the blues mandolin. He bought his first mandolin at age eight, in a trade for a pig his family had given him to raise. He often performed with the guitarist and singer Sleepy John Estes. "She Caught the Katy," which he wrote with Taj Mahal, is considered a blues standard.

He appeared in the 1985 documentary film Louie Bluie (directed by Terry Zwigoff), about the musician Howard Armstrong. Rachell performed with John Sebastian and the J-Band in the film.

By the mid-1990s, Rachell and Henry Townsend were the only blues musicians still active whose careers started in the 1920s. Late in his life Rachell suffered from arthritis, which shortened his playing sessions, but he recorded an album just before his death, Too Hot for the Devil.

== Film ==
- Louie Bluie (1985), directed by Terry Zwigoff

== See also ==
- List of country blues musicians
- List of Piedmont blues musicians
