= Charles Neill =

American physician

Charles Neill (March 11, 1914 – September 28, 2002) was the first neurosurgeon in the state of Mississippi. He helped establish the neurosurgery residency program at the University of Mississippi Medical Center. Neill held office in the Southern Neurosurgical Society from 1958 to 1963 in the following capacities:

- 1959 - Vice President
- 1959-1962 - Secretary
- 1963 - President-Elect
- 1964 - President
