= James Govan =

American singer

- Also known as: The Kid
- Born: James Govan; September 2, 1949; McComb, Mississippi, U.S.
- Died: July 18, 2014 (aged 64)
- Genres: Blues, soul
- Occupations: Singer, songwriter
- Instrument: Percussion
- Years active: 1969–2014
- Labels: Charly, Overture

James Govan (September 2, 1949 – July 18, 2014) was an American blues soul singer. His most recent album, I'm in Need, was released in 1996. He had also performed alongside such artists as The Boogie Blues Band and Charlie Wood. Govan had become one of the favorite musicians on Beale Street, known for his cavernous baritone voice. He routinely performed for over two decades at the Rum Boogie Café.

== Early life ==
Govan was born in McComb, Mississippi, and by the age of 13 was playing the guitar.

== Career ==
Govan played for a group named The Vans, when he was discovered by FAME Studios's George Jackson. Govan recorded with Fame's Mickey Buckins in 1969 and released several singles with Fame through 1972, but they failed to sell. These recordings, including several that were never released, were released by Ace Records in 2013.

Govan performed at Beale Street in Memphis, Tennessee, from 1989 to 2014, performing vocals and percussion. Starting in 1994, he performed regularly with the Boogies Blues Band at the Rum Boogie Café, Beale Street. In that time, they were named the Best House Band on Beale Street three times by the Beale Street Merchants Association, and they headlined the BSMA awards for the 2002–2004 Awards Ceremonies.

Govan and fellow musician Don Chandler both received a key to the City of Memphis for their contribution to the music scene in Beale Street over the previous 15 years. Such an honor has not been received by any other musician on historic Beale Street.

Govan was the hero of the Porretta Soul Festival, Tribute To Otis Redding, Italy, where he performed from 1993 to 1997. The latest live performance album by James Govan and the Boogie Blues Band was released in 1999, entitled A Night on Beale. This commemorated 10 years of performing on Beale Street.

Rum Boogie themselves claim that their commitment to Memphis music 7 days a week makes Beale Street "Home of the Blues, Birthplace of Rock n Roll".

Govan died at the age of 64 on July 18, 2014.

== Discography ==
=== Albums ===
- 1987: I'm In Need
- 1998: A Night on Beale (feat Boogie Blues Band)
- 2003: Eyes/Dangerous (percussion) (credited)
- 2013: Wanted: The Fame Recordings
