= PonJola Coney =

American reproductive endocrinologist

- Born: December 31, 1951 (age 74); Pike County, Mississippi, US

Academic background
- Education: BSc, 1973, Xavier University of Louisiana; MD, 1978, University of Mississippi School of Medicine

Academic work
- Institutions: Virginia Commonwealth University; Southern Illinois University School of Medicine; University of Nebraska–Lincoln; University of Oklahoma

PonJola Coney (born December 31, 1951) is an American reproductive endocrinologist. Coney is currently director of the Virginia Commonwealth University (VCU) Center on Health Disparities and professor of obstetrics and gynecology in the VCU School of Medicine.

== Early life and education ==
Coney was born on December 31, 1951, in Pike County, Mississippi, US, to parents Lethell and Dorothy Williams. Growing up, she was a member of the Eva Gordon Attendance Center Science Club, where she won a first place ribbon in the Mathematics Division at the 1968 State M. T. A. Science Fair and the Seventh Educational District Science and Art Fair.

Following high school, Coney chose to attend Xavier University of Louisiana, despite being Southern Baptist, in order to major in medical technology. During this time, she interned at the Morris Cafrits Hospital in Washington, D.C. Due to her major, she interacted with medical students, residents, and interns in training, one of which convinced her to enroll in medical school. Coney was subsequently accepted into the University of Mississippi School of Medicine, where she was one of 15 black students out of a class of 150. Coney then completed her residency in obstetrics and gynecology at the University of North Carolina and a fellowship in reproductive endocrinology and infertility at Pennsylvania Hospital.

== Career ==
Following medical school, Coney pursued a career in infertility and reproductive medicine. In 1984, Coney established the infertility program at the University of Oklahoma and completed the city's first attempt at a laboratory conception. As a result of her success, Coney was appointed chair of the obstetrics and gynecology department at Southern Illinois University School of Medicine in 1994. Upon accepting her appointment, Coney became the first African American woman physician to be appointed dean of any United States medical school. During her first year in this role, she was also selected for the inaugural class of fellows for the Executive Leadership in Academic Medicine.

Coney remained at the Southern Illinois University School of Medicine until 2002, when she accepted an appointment to senior vice president for health affairs at Meharry Medical College and dean of its medical school. In 2006, Coney left Meharry to become the director of the Virginia Commonwealth University (VCU) Center on Health Disparities and professor of obstetrics and gynecology in the VCU School of Medicine. In 2012, Coney was elected to the National Academy of Medicine (then referred to as the Institute of Medicine) in recognition of her contributions to women’s health and health disparities.
