= Robertson-Yates House =

Historic house in Mississippi, United States

- Robertson--Yates House
- U.S. National Register of Historic Places
- Location within Mississippi
- Nearest city: Hernando, Mississippi
- Coordinates: 34°47′10″N 90°01′23″W
- Area: less than one acre
- Built: 1850
- Architectural style: Queen Anne, Greek Revival
- NRHP reference No.: 03000554
- Added to NRHP: June 23, 2003

The Robertson-Yates House is a historic house on a former plantation in Hernando, Mississippi. It was built in 1850 for John Robertson, a settler, and his wife Susan. It was inherited by their daughter Annie Eliza Robertson, and her husband George Yates.

The house was designed in the Queen Anne architectural style, with Greek Revival features. It has been on the National Register of Historic Places since June 23, 2003.
