= Vicksburg Citizens' Appeal =

American newspaper (1964–1967)

- Cover of the November 15, 1964, issue
- Type: Initially weekly, later biweekly
- Format: Tabloid
- Owner(s): Warren County, Mississippi, chapter of the Mississippi Freedom Democratic Party
- Founder(s): Paul Cowan; Dilla Irwin; Aaron Shirley
- Publisher: Hill City Publishing Corporation
- Editor: Ollye Shirley; Dilla Irwin
- Founded: August 22, 1964
- Ceased publication: 1967
- Political alignment: Mississippi Freedom Democratic Party
- Language: English
- Headquarters: Vicksburg, Mississippi
- City: New Orleans
- Country: United States
- OCLC number: 10666472

The Vicksburg Citizens' Appeal was an American newspaper that served the Vicksburg, Mississippi, area from 1964 to 1967. It was published by the Warren County, Mississippi, chapter of the Mississippi Freedom Democratic Party. It was established by several civil rights activists, including Paul Cowan and Aaron Shirley, in order to provide coverage of the ongoing civil rights movement in the state.

== History ==
=== Formation ===
The Vicksburg Citizens' Appeal was established by the Warren County, Mississippi, chapter of the Mississippi Freedom Democratic Party (MFDP) in August 1964. Founders included Paul Cowan, Dilla Irwin, and Aaron Shirley, with aid from several Freedom Riders. Shirley had been a founder of the MFDP the previous year and served as the chairman of the county chapter. Initial funding was provided in the form of a $400 (equivalent to $4,152 in 2025) loan provided by a local activist, while ten shares of the company were sold at $40 ($415 in 2025) each. According to Cowan, during a meeting with activist Bob Moses, Moses requested that the newspaper come under the direct control of the Student Nonviolent Coordinating Committee, though Cowan refused on the basis of avoiding any potential censorship.

The goal of the newspaper would be to publish information on happenings in the black community at a local, national, and international level. Civil rights activists started the newspaper because of an inability to get existing local media outlets to cover civil rights activities. In particular, the local newspaper serving the Vicksburg, Mississippi, area, The Vicksburg Post, largely avoided coverage of the African American community at large. In discussing the Citizens' Appeal, the Columbia Journalism Review stated that in March 1964, the African American community of Vicksburg had boycotted the Post after it refused to use courtesy titles for African Americans. Following the boycott, the Post began to use titles, but confined coverage of the African American community to a section of their paper titled "Among Colored Folks". Additionally, Shirley specifically stated that local media censorship regarding violence by white people against black people was a primary reason for starting the newspaper.

According to Cowan, the people who established the newspaper referred to it in fundraising efforts as the "first community civil-rights newspaper in Mississippi". The newspaper was one of several established by civil rights activists in the state during the civil rights movement, with historian Julius E. Thompson stating that the number of commercial African American newspapers in Mississippi increased from three in the 1950s to ten in the 1960s. The growth of these newspapers was also due in part to the conservative nature of the state's largest African American newspaper, the Jackson Advocate, which had limited coverage on the ongoing civil rights protests occurring in the state.

=== Publication and editorship ===
Locations of New Orleans—where the newspaper was printed—and Vicksburg

The newspaper was in the form of an eight-page tabloid. While its first issue was released on August 22, 1964, its next issue would not be published until October, when the publishers were able to assemble a journalism team and secure enough funding for sustained publication. Initially published as a weekly, it became a biweekly publication on November 2. Individual issues cost 10¢ ($1.04 in 2025), while a yearly subscription cost $3.50 ($36.33 in 2025). It was published by the Hill City Publishing Corporation. While the newspaper served the Vicksburg area, it was printed in New Orleans at a cost of $200 ($2,076 in 2025) per edition. According to two activists who worked on the newspaper, this was because no one in the local area would publish the newspaper. According to Thompson, the newspaper had an average circulation of between 300 and 500, though at various points it peaked to about 3,000. However, reporting on the newspaper in December 1964, Jet magazine stated that the newspaper had a press run that peaked at about 4,000 copies. That same year, Shirley and his wife, Ollye, took copies of the newspaper to be distributed at the 1964 Democratic National Convention.

Ollye served as the newspaper's first editor. During its run, Dilla Irwin also served as an editor. Irwin was a member of the NAACP and a full-time activist who had previously served as an assistant dean of women at Grambling College. The editorship of two women on the newspaper was not uncommon for similar African American newspapers published in the state during this time, with several other newspapers also being led by women. According to Irwin, news was sourced both locally and from individuals who were sympathetic to the civil rights movement, such as Ralph McGill, the editor and publisher of The Atlanta Constitution. Reporting was performed by both local African Americans and by volunteers present with the Council of Federated Organizations. The address for the newspaper offices was not made public and instead it received mail via a post office box.

=== Closure ===
The newspaper ceased publication in 1967. (Note: In a 1993 book that discusses the newspaper, historian Julius E. Thompson stated that the newspaper ceased publication in 1966, but later contradicted himself by saying that its publication continued into at least 1967. Additionally, The Vicksburg Post stated in a 2023 article that the newspaper ceased publishing in 1967, a year also given in a 2017 entry in The Mississippi Encyclopedia.) According to Ebony magazine, the newspaper folded due to a lack of funds. In discussing the newspaper's financial difficulties, Irwin later said that, while the publication was initially well received by the African American community of Vicksburg, it struggled to sell, due in large part to the high poverty present in the community. Irwin said that a significant factor in the newspaper surviving for as long as it did was its advertising, with businessmen purchasing space in the newspaper for about $2 ($20.76 in 2025) per advertisement. In a 1965 analysis of the newspaper, the Columbia Journalism Review reported that the publishers of the Citizens' Appeal said that their break-even point for each issue could be reached by selling $50 ($511 in 2025) of advertising and selling 2,000 copies at 10¢ ($1.02 in 2025) each.

In his discussion of the Citizens' Appeal and other related newspapers, Thompson said that these newspapers suffered from a reliance on donations from liberal activists outside of the region and from work—often unpaid—from volunteers. As a result, many of these newspapers only published for an average of three to four years, whereas the more conservative African American newspapers in the state—which, according to Thompson, received support from both black and white advertisers and the Mississippi State Sovereignty Commission—were more successful and, on average, more long-lived.

=== Legacy ===
In the 2017 book The Mississippi Encyclopedia, academic Margaret Bean of the University of Mississippi said regarding the newspaper:

Despite its short life, the Vicksburg Citizens' Appeal was a significant presence in mid-1960s Mississippi. When many historically white newspapers were ignoring or belittling the civil rights movement and when some African American-run newspapers were counseling slow change, the Citizens' Appeal was an activist newspaper.

In the early 1970s, David Riley, who had served as an associate editor for the Citizens' Appeal, cofounded another independent newspaper in Washington, D.C.: the Colonial Times. In 2023, Vicksburg native and scholar Donald Field Brown held an event at the Catfish Row Museum in Vicksburg discussing the history and legacy of the Citizens' Appeal as part of a lecture series supported by the Smithsonian Institution called "Voices and Votes: Democracy in America".

== See also ==
- List of African American newspapers in Mississippi
- List of defunct newspapers of the United States

== Sources ==
- Bean, Margaret (2017). "Vicksburg Citizens' Appeal". In Ownby, Ted; Wilson, Charles Reagan; Abadie, Ann J.; Lindsey, Odie; Thomas, James G. Jr. (eds.). The Mississippi Encyclopedia. Sponsored by the Center for the Study of Southern Culture at the University of Mississippi. Jackson, Mississippi: University Press of Mississippi. p. 1287. ISBN 978-1-62846-692-8. OCLC 959373243.
- Beaugez, Jim (January 10, 2023). "Brown to lead 'lunch and learn' on the legacy of the 'Vicksburg Citizens' Appeal'". The Vicksburg Post. ISSN 1086-9360. OCLC 34135307. Archived from the original on October 28, 2025.
- Boylan, James, ed. (Winter 1965). "Arrivals and Departures". Columbia Journalism Review. III (4): 40–41. ISSN 0010-194X. OCLC 464657921.
- Brown, Erin (2015). "Aaron Shirley, 1933–2014". Contemporary Black Biography: Profiles from the International Black Community. Vol. 126. Farmington Hills, Michigan: Gale. pp. 140–142. ISBN 978-1-57302-425-9. OCLC 918898282.
- Brumfield, Dale M. (2015). Independent Press in D.C. and Virginia: An Underground History. Foreword by Katya Sabaroff Taylor. Charleston, South Carolina: The History Press. ISBN 978-1-62585-438-4. OCLC 939524238.
- Classen, Steven D. (2004). Spigel, Lynn (ed.). Watching Jim Crow: The Struggles Over Mississippi TV, 1955–1969. Durham, North Carolina: Duke University Press. doi:10.1515/9780822385424. ISBN 978-0-8223-3341-8. OCLC 649873691.
- Cooper, Caryl A. (2001). "Percy Greene and the Jackson Advocate". In Davies, David R. (ed.). The Press and Race: Mississippi Journalists Confront the Movement. Jackson, Mississippi: University Press of Mississippi. pp. 55–84. ISBN 978-1-4968-0140-1. OCLC 811507308.
- Cowan, Paul (1970). The Making of an Un-American: A Dialogue with Experience. New York City: Viking Press. ISBN 978-0-670-45166-1. OCLC 63691.
- Dittmer, John (1995) [1994]. Local People: The Struggle for Civil Rights in Mississippi (1st Paperback ed.). Urbana, Illinois: University of Illinois Press. ISBN 978-0-252-06507-1. OCLC 29184630.
- Gates, Jimmie E. (June 6, 2014). "Jimmie E. Gates: Apathy and the political process". Clarion Ledger. Gannett. ISSN 0744-9526. OCLC 8674244.
- Johnson, John H., ed. (December 17, 1964). "New Blackout Gives Birth to New Miss. Paper". Jet. XXVII (11). Chicago: Johnson Publishing Company: 48. ISSN 0021-5996. OCLC 1781708.
- Johnson, John H., ed. (August 1971). "It's Good to be Home Again". Ebony. XXVI (10). Chicago: Johnson Publishing Company: 66–71. ISSN 0012-9011. OCLC 1567306.
- Rahman, Ahmad A. (2007). The Regime Change of Kwame Nkrumah: Epic Heroism in Africa and the Diaspora. New York City: Palgrave Macmillan. ISBN 978-0-230-60348-6. OCLC 314776092.
- Squires, Catherine (2009). African Americans and the Media. Cambridge: Polity Press. ISBN 978-0-7456-4036-5. OCLC 320315668.
- Thompson, Julius E. (1993). The Black Press in Mississippi, 1865–1985. Gainesville, Florida: University Press of Florida. ISBN 978-0-8130-1174-5. OCLC 44959048.
- "Freedom Summer pair reunite here, recall scary time". The Vicksburg Post. March 23, 2009. ISSN 1086-9360. OCLC 34135307. Archived from the original on October 28, 2025.
- Zinn, Howard (2014). Kreitner, Richard (ed.). Some Truths Are Not Self-Evident: Howard Zinn in The Nation on Civil Rights, Vietnam and the "War on Terror". Introduction by Frances Fox Piven. New York City: The Nation Company. ISBN 978-1-940489-17-9. OCLC 937773977.
