= National Register of Historic Places listings in DeSoto County, Mississippi =

Location of DeSoto County in Mississippi

This is a list of the National Register of Historic Places listings in DeSoto County, Mississippi.

This is intended to be a complete list of the properties and districts on the National Register of Historic Places in DeSoto County, Mississippi, United States. Latitude and longitude coordinates are provided for many National Register properties and districts; these locations may be seen together in a map.

There are 13 properties and districts listed on the National Register in the county.

This National Park Service list is complete through NPS recent listings posted October 23, 2026.

== Current listings ==
	Name on the Register	Image	Date listed	Location	City or town	Description
1	Circle G Ranch		December 9, 2019 (#100004749)	5921 Goodman Rd. W (MS 302 at intersection with MS 301); 34°57′45″N 90°05′42″W	Horn Lake	
2	Dockery House		August 25, 2004 (#04000901)	3831 Robertson Gin Road; 34°48′11″N 90°00′38″W	Hernando	Constructed c. 1876
3	Hernando Commerce Street Historic District		August 30, 2001 (#01000918)	Roughly along Commerce St., west of West St., S. 34°49′25″N 89°59′50″W	Hernando	
4	Hernando Courthouse Square District	Hernando Courthouse Square District	March 5, 1998 (#98000185)	Roughly bounded by Caffey, W. Commerce, and Losher Sts., and U.S. Highway 51; 34°49′23″N 89°59′41″W	Hernando	
5	Hernando North Side Historic District		August 30, 2001 (#01000916)	North of Holly Springs St., east of U.S. Route 51, west of Northview St., on W. Northern St., W. Valley St., Shady Ln., and Holly Springs St. 34°49′30″N 89°59′32″W	Hernando	
6	Hernando South Side (Magnolia) Historic District		August 30, 2001 (#01000917)	Roughly bounded by Oak Grove Rd., Magnolia Dr., W. Center St., and Church St. 34°49′12″N 89°59′27″W	Hernando	
7	Hernando Water Tower	Hernando Water Tower	September 18, 2013 (#13000736)	NE. corner of Losher & Church Sts. 34°49′22″N 89°59′32″W	Hernando	
8	Holiday Inn University		May 28, 2021 (#100006591)	7300 Hacks Cross Rd. 34°58′00″N 89°47′33″W	Olive Branch	
9	Felix Labauve House	Felix Labauve House	March 29, 1978 (#78003074)	2769 (formerly 235) Magnolia Drive; 34°49′11″N 89°59′23″W	Hernando	Constructed c. 1865
10	Miller Plantation House		July 15, 1982 (#82004630)	Miller Road; 34°55′28″N 89°46′45″W	Olive Branch	Constructed c. 1849
11	North Elm Historic District		March 27, 2012 (#12000153)	Roughly bounded by North, W. Robinson, & Memphis Sts., & Holmes Rd. 34°49′37″N 89°59′53″W	Hernando	
12	Robertson-Yates House		June 23, 2003 (#03000554)	5000 Robertson Gin Road; 34°47′10″N 90°01′23″W	Hernando	Constructed c. 1850
13	Springhill Cemetery	Springhill Cemetery	July 25, 2012 (#12000430)	College St. & W. Oak Grove Rd. 34°48′59″N 90°00′07″W	Hernando	

== See also ==
- List of National Historic Landmarks in Mississippi
- National Register of Historic Places listings in Mississippi
