= Ollye Shirley =

American civil rights activist (1934–2016)

Ollye Brown Shirley
- Born: January 10, 1934
- Died: September 10, 2016 (aged 82)
- Education: Tougaloo College
- Occupation: Educator
- Known for: Civil rights activism
- Spouse: Aaron Shirley

Ollye Brown Shirley (January 10, 1934 – September 10, 2016) was an American educator and civil rights activist. During the 1960s, she served as an editor for the Vicksburg Citizens' Appeal, an African American newspaper that covered the civil rights movement. Following a move with her husband, Aaron Shirley, to Jackson, Mississippi, in 1965, she served as a teacher and a member of the board of the board for the Jackson Public School District, including a period as the board's president. She also served as president of the Mississippi NAACP's Education Committee and was a state and regional coordinator for the Public Broadcasting Service. In this later role, she was involved in ensuring that Sesame Street was broadcast in the state following a temporary ban on its broadcast. In 2020, the Jackson school board renamed an elementary school in honor of Shirley and her husband.

== Early life and education ==
Ollye Brown was born on January 10, 1934. She was raised around Mound Bayou, Mississippi, a city in the Mississippi Delta which at the time was an all-African American community. As a child, she was educated in a one-room school. Reflecting later on this period of her life, she said, "My parents were the teachers. Their salaries were low, and our supplies were all left over from the white schools. The bus picking up the white kids would pass us on the road, sometimes forcing us into the ditch." She graduated from high school in 1949 at the age of fifteen and enrolled at Tougaloo College in Jackson, Mississippi. During this time, she met Aaron Shirley. The couple married while they were still in college. Shirley later earned a doctorate in education.

== Civil rights activism ==
=== Activism in Vicksburg ===
After marriage, the couple moved to Nashville, Tennessee, where Aaron attended Meharry Medical College. In 1960, the couple moved to Vicksburg, Mississippi, where Aaron began to practice medicine and Shirley worked as a teacher. While in Nashville, they participated in a civil rights movement demonstration for the first time and became more involved in activism after returning to Mississippi. During this time, the two of them helped to operate a local newspaper, the Vicksburg Citizens' Appeal, which covered the city's African American community and the civil rights movement. Shirley served as the newspaper's editor. Additionally, the family participated in voter registration drives. During their time in Vicksburg, the family received several death threats and made several precautions for their safety. During house calls, Shirley accompanied her husband, with the family arming themselves. Additionally, the family moved houses in part due to concerns over safety. Per the Clarion Ledger, the family's house was firebombed.

=== Move to Jackson ===
In 1965, Aaron became the first African American resident at the University of Mississippi Medical Center in Jackson, with the couple moving to the city that year. While in Jackson, Shirley became a teacher at Lanier High School and became a board member of the Jackson Public School District. She ultimately served on the board for 15 years, including a tenure as the board's president. During that time, Shirley pushed for the removal of symbols associated with the Confederate States of America at Forest Hill High School. Additionally, she served as the chair for the Education Committee of the state's NAACP chapter. Shirley was also a state and, later, regional coordinator for the Public Broadcasting Service. In this position, she was involved in ensuring that Sesame Street was broadcast in the state, which had temporarily been barred from airing over its racially diverse cast.

== Death and legacy ==
Shirley died on September 10, 2016, at the age of 82. The Clarion Ledger reported that she died in her home of natural causes. Several years prior to her death, she had been chronicled in a 2010 documentary film called In Spite of It All: The Ollye Brown Shirley Story. In 2017, the Jackson Public School District announced that it would be renaming several schools named after figures from the Confederate States of America. Concerning Lee Elementary School, which was named after Robert E. Lee of the Confederate States Army, the school board renamed it Shirley Elementary School in honor of both Aaron and Olye in 2020.

== See also ==
- African Americans in Mississippi

== Sources ==
- Ballou, Howard (September 13, 2016). "Dr. Ollye Shirley remembered as "remarkable woman"". WLBT. Archived from the original on June 20, 2026.
- Bean, Margaret (April 15, 2018) [October 16, 2017]. "Vicksburg Citizens' Appeal". The Mississippi Encyclopedia. Archived from the original on July 22, 2024.
- Fowler, Sarah (September 12, 2016). "Mississippi icon Ollye Shirley dies". Clarion Ledger. Gannett. ISSN 0744-9526. OCLC 8674244.
- Gates, Jimmie E. (June 6, 2014). "Jimmie E. Gates: Apathy and the political process". Clarion Ledger. Gannett. ISSN 0744-9526. OCLC 8674244.
- Lefkowitz, Bonnie (2007). Community Health Centers: A Movement and the People Who Made It Happen. Critical Issues in Health and Medicine. New Brunswick, New Jersey: Rutgers University Press. doi:10.36019/9780813541310. ISBN 978-0-8135-3911-9. LCCN 2006011530. OCLC 191678878.
- Pettus, Emily Wagster (September 24, 2020a). "Majority-Black school in Jackson to drop Confederate name. Here are semifinalist options". Clarion Ledger. Gannett. Associated Press. ISSN 0744-9526. OCLC 8674244.
- Pettus, Gary (December 28, 2020b). "With new name, public school venerates Shirleys' memory". University of Mississippi Medical Center. Archived from the original on December 30, 2020.
- Rowe, Keisha (December 16, 2020). "Two Jackson schools now named for civil rights leaders instead of Confederate soldiers". Clarion Ledger. Gannett. ISSN 0744-9526. OCLC 8674244.
- "About Shirley". Shirley Elementary School. Archived from the original on June 21, 2026.
- Thompson, Shderia (September 12, 2016) [September 11, 2016]. "Community mourns passing of Dr. Ollye Shirley". WLBT. Archived from the original on June 20, 2026.
- Tran, Bach (February 24, 2021). "Dr. Aaron Shirley: Health Care Innovator". National Association of Community Health Centers. Archived from the original on August 2, 2023.
- "Freedom Summer pair reunite here, recall scary time". The Vicksburg Post. March 23, 2009. ISSN 1086-9360. OCLC 34135307. Archived from the original on October 28, 2025.
- Ward, Thomas J. Jr. (2017). Out in the Rural: A Mississippi Health Center and Its War on Poverty. Foreword by H. Jack Geiger. New York City: Oxford University Press. ISBN 978-0-19-062462-0. LCCN 2016021267. OCLC 947145297.
