= University of Mississippi Medical Center School of Dentistry =

Medical school in Jackson, Mississippi, US

Coordinates: 32.329088°N 90.174386°W

- Type: Public university
- Established: 1973
- Dean: Dr. David Felton
- Location: Jackson, MS, U.S.
- Website: dentistry.umc.edu

The University of Mississippi Medical Center School of Dentistry is a dental graduate school that is part of the University of Mississippi. Located in Jackson, Mississippi, U.S. on the campus of the University of Mississippi Medical Center, it is the only dental school in Mississippi.

== History ==
Founded in March 1973, the University of Mississippi Medical Center School of Dentistry, a part of University of Mississippi admitted its first class in 1975.

== Academics ==
The University of Mississippi Medical Center School of Dentistry of Dentistry awards following degrees:

- Doctor of Dental Medicine

The school ranks fifth in part one of the National Board Dental Examination (2000) and the sixth in the part two of the National Board Dental Examinations (2001).

== Departments ==
University of Mississippi Medical Center School of Dentistry includes following departments:

- Advanced General Dentistry
- Biomedical Materials Science
- Care Planning and Restorative Sciences
- Endodontics
- Oral-Maxillofacial Surgery and Pathology
- Orthodontics
- Pediatric and Public Health Dentistry
- Periodontics and Preventive Sciences

== Accreditation ==
The University of Mississippi Medical Center School of Dentistry is currently accredited by American Dental Association (ADA).
