= John A. Elkington =

American real estate developer

John A. Elkington is an American real estate developer best known for the redevelopment of Beale Street, the entertainment district in Memphis, Tennessee, known in the United States as a popular tourist destination.

== Education and early career ==
Elkington earned a B.A. in psychology from Vanderbilt University before graduating from the University of Memphis Cecil C. Humphreys School of Law. He began his business career in 1975 by launching a company that specialized in property management for condominiums.

In 1979, with business partner Steve Keltner, Elkington built the first private unit development (PUD) in Memphis. The success of this venture was followed by many other residential developments and by 1985, Elkington & Keltner Group was ranked #79 on Inc. magazine's "Inc. 5000," an annual list of the fastest-growing private companies in the U.S. For 10 years, Elkington & Keltner was named one of the "Top 100 Builders" in America by Professional Builder magazine.

In the 1990s, Elkington formed a new company focused on urban redevelopment, with projects as varied as Nashville's historic Union Station, the Scimitar Building in downtown Memphis, and Lenox School in midtown Memphis. Lenox School, built in 1912, had been closed for years before its conversion into condominiums that retained the integrity of the original building. In 2002, John Elkington was the recipient of the A.W. Willis Preservation Award from the Memphis Heritage Foundation, a non-profit historic preservation society.

== Beale Street ==
John Elkington's involvement with the redevelopment of historic Beale Street in downtown Memphis began in 1982. After decades of decline and an ill-conceived urban renewal program that left the formerly vibrant area desolate and the street lined with empty, crumbling buildings, John Elkington agreed to lead the development and management of the massive project. He had three goals for Beale Street's restoration: preserve the music, bring commerce back, and maintain a diversity of owners and patrons.

He successfully recruited B. B. King to Memphis in 1991 to open the original B. B. King's Blues Club, and led development of the W. C. Handy Performing Arts Park on Beale Street, named for the musician and composer widely regarded as the "Father of the Blues."

By the mid-1990s, Beale Street was drawing thousands of visitors each year. In 2013, Beale Street was voted "Most Iconic American Street" by readers in a USA Today "10Best" poll.

Once, when asked why Beale Street was so successful, Elkington replied, "We're genuine. We're real. It's allowing your tenants to be as creative as possible... You want every experience to be unique. We're living in an experience economy, we really are. People are looking for things that are different. We're looking for things that have longevity."

== Honors and associations ==
The success of Beale Street earned John Elkington many honors, including being named by Memphis Magazine in 2011 as one of "The Memphis 35" – people whose influence over the past 35 years "was critical to the growth and evolution of our city." Three years later, the Memphis Flyer tapped him as one of "25 Who Shaped Memphis: 1989-2014." The Brass Note Walk of Fame along the sidewalks of Beale Street offers "a tangible embodiment of the many talented people who had put Memphis music and Beale Street on the world map," and includes a note honoring the contributions of John Elkington. Government entities also recognized his years of work resurrecting Beale Street: He was honored by the U.S. Congress in 2008, and by the Tennessee General Assembly in 2010.

Through the development of Beale Street, Elkington became active in expanding music tourism in Memphis. In 1992, he served on the board of the Memphis in May International Festival, a month-long series of events that includes a three-day music festival and a world championship barbecue contest. He was appointed to the Tennessee Film, Entertainment & Music Commission in 1996, and was honored with the Blue Note Award from the Blues Foundation. In 2005, he joined the executive committee of the Memphis Convention & Visitors Bureau board.

As a real estate professional, Elkington earned his CCIM designation (Certified Commercial Investment Member) in 1992, and was honored by the MAAR (Memphis Area Association of Realtors) in 2012 as Retail Broker of the Year.

Elkington has held positions on several local and state industry boards, including Chairman of the Tennessee Board for Licensing Contractors. Under his leadership, the board first implemented a statewide qualification test for contractors.

Elkington has served as Chairman of the Memphis and Shelby County Land Use Control Board, which has the responsibility of overseeing and guiding the growth of Memphis and Shelby County through zoning regulations. He has also served as Vice Chairman of the Downtown Memphis Commission, Chairman of the Downtown Parking Authority, as a board member of the Memphis Park Commission, and as Secretary of the Downtown Development Board. He is currently a member of the Germantown (TN) Parks and Recreation Board in suburban Memphis.

A founding board member of the National Civil Rights Museum in Memphis, John Elkington also played a key role in the redevelopment of the historic Orpheum Theatre, and the downtown relocation of the University of Memphis Cecil C. Humphreys School of Law.

John Elkington is a longtime member of the Rotary Club of Memphis, and was honored in 2015 as the Rotarian of the Year and as a Paul Harris Fellow. He was elected chapter president for 2019–2020.
