= Frank Stokes (musician) =

Background information
- Born: January 1, 1877 or 1888; Shelby County, Tennessee, United States
- Died: September 12, 1955 (aged 67 or 78) Memphis, Tennessee, United States
- Genres: Delta blues, country blues
- Occupations: Singer, guitarist, songwriter
- Instruments: Vocals, guitar
- Labels: Vocalion, Victor

Frank Stokes (January 1, 1877 or 1888 – September 12, 1955) was an American blues musician, songster, and blackface minstrel, who is considered by many musicologists to be the father of the Memphis blues guitar style.

== Biography ==
Stokes was born in Shelby County, Tennessee, in the vicinity of Whitehaven, located two miles north of the Mississippi state line. There is uncertainty over his year of birth; his daughter and later sources reported 1888, but the researchers Bob Eagle and Eric LeBlanc give 1877, the date on his World War I draft card.

His parents died when he was a child, and he was raised by his stepfather in Tutwiler, Mississippi. He learned to play the guitar as a youth in Tutwiler and, after 1895, in Hernando, Mississippi, which was the home of the guitarists Jim Jackson, Dan Sane, Elijah Avery (of Cannon's Jug Stompers), and Robert Wilkins. By the turn of the century, Stokes was working as a blacksmith, traveling 25 miles to Memphis on weekends to sing and play the guitar with Sane, with whom he formed a long-term musical partnership. Together, they busked on the streets and in Church's Park (now W. C. Handy Park) on Memphis's Beale Street in Memphis.

In the mid-1910s, Stokes joined another Mississippi musician, Garfield Akers, as a blackface songster, comedian, and buck dancer in the Doc Watts Medicine Show, a tent show that toured the South. During this period of touring, Stokes developed a professionalism that set him apart from many of the more rural, less polished blues musicians of that time and place. It is said that his performances on the southern minstrel and vaudeville circuit around this time influenced the country singer Jimmie Rodgers, who played the same circuit. Rodgers borrowed songs and song fragments from Stokes and was influenced stylistically as well.

Around 1920, Stokes settled in Oakville, Tennessee, where he went back to work as a blacksmith. He teamed up again with Sane, playing dances, picnics, fish fries, saloons, and parties in his free time. The two joined Jack Kelly's Jug Busters to play at white country clubs, parties, and dances. Stokes and Sane performed on Beale Street as the Beale Street Sheiks and first recorded under that name for Paramount Records in August 1927. Stokes eventually cut 38 sides for Paramount and Victor Records. "The fluid guitar interplay between Stokes and Sane, combined with a propulsive beat, witty lyrics, and Stokes's stentorian voice, make their recordings irresistible." Their duet style influenced the young Memphis Minnie in duets with her husband, Kansas Joe McCoy.

The Sheiks next recorded at a session for Victor Records in February 1928, at which Furry Lewis also recorded. At this session, the emphasis was on blues rather than the older songs that were also part of Stokes's repertoire. Stokes recorded again for Victor that August, playing "I Got Mine", one of a body of pre-blues songs about gambling, stealing and living high. He also recorded the more modern "Nehi Mama" (or "Nehi Mama Blues", also rendered as "Nehi Mamma Blues"), the title being a pun on the name of the Nehi soft drink and the knee-high skirts that were fashionable at the time. Sane joined Stokes for the second day of the August 1928 session, and they produced a two-part version of "Tain't Nobody's Business if I Do", a song well known in later versions by Bessie Smith and Jimmy Witherspoon but whose origin lies in the pre-blues era. The Sheiks also continued to busk on the streets and perform at parties.

In 1929, Stokes and Sane recorded again for Paramount, resuming their billing as the Beale Street Sheiks for a few cuts. In September, Stokes was back with Victor to make what were to be his last recordings, this time without Sane but with Will Batts playing the fiddle. Stokes and Batts were a team, as evidenced by these records, which are both traditional and wildly original, but their style had fallen out of favor with the record-buying public. Stokes was still a popular live performer, however, appearing in medicine shows, the Ringling Brothers Circus, and other tent shows and similar venues during the 1930s and 1940s. In the 1940s, he moved to Clarksdale, Mississippi, and occasionally worked with Bukka White in local juke joints. By 1952, illness and old age forced Stokes to retire from performing.

Stokes died of a stroke in Memphis on September 12, 1955. He is buried in Hollywood Cemetery, in Memphis. In 2017, Frank Stokes was inducted into the Memphis Music Hall of Fame.

== Discography ==
- Frank Stokes with Dan Sane & Will Bats 1927–1929 (Roots, 1968)
- Creator of the Memphis Blues (Yazoo, 1977)
- The Remaining Titles (Matchbox, 1984)
- The Victor Recordings in Chronological Order 1928–1929 (Document, 1990)
- The Best of Frank Stokes (Yazoo, 2005)
- Downtown Blues (Monk, 2010)

== Songs recorded by Stokes ==
- "Ain't Goin' to Do Like I Used to Do"
- "Beale Town Bound"
- "Bedtime Blues"
- "Blues in 'D'"
- "Bunker Hill Blues"
- "Chicken You Can Roost Behind the Moon"
- "Downtown Blues"
- "Fillin' in Blues"
- "Frank Stokes' Dream"
- "Half Cup of Tea"
- "How Long"
- "Hunting Blues"
- "I Got Mine"
- "I'm Going Away Blues"
- "It Won't Be Long Now"
- "It's a Good Thing"
- "Jazzin' the Blues"
- "Jumpin on the Hill"
- "Last Go Round"
- "Memphis Rounders Blues"
- "Mistreatin' Blues"
- "Mr. Crump Don't Like It"
- "Nehi Mama"
- "Old Sometime Blues"
- "Right Now Blues"
- "Rockin' on the Hill Blues"
- "Shiney Town Blues"
- "South Memphis Blues"
- "Sweet to Mama"
- "Tain't Nobody's Business if I Do"
- "Take Me Back"
- "Wasn't That Doggin' Me"
- "What's the Matter Blues"
- "You Shall"
