= Miller Plantation House =

Historic house in Mississippi, United States

- U.S. National Register of Historic Places
- Location within Mississippi
- Nearest city: Olive Branch, Mississippi
- Coordinates: 34°55′28″N 89°46′45″W
- Area: 1 acre (0.40 ha)
- Built: 1849
- Architectural style: Greek Revival
- NRHP reference No.: 82004630
- Added to NRHP: July 15, 1982

The Miller Plantation House is a historic mansion in Olive Branch, Mississippi. It was built in 1849 for William Lord Miller, a planter. It was designed in the Greek Revival architectural style, and its large size was unusual for its remote location. It has been listed on the National Register of Historic Places since July 15, 1982.
