= Dan Sane =

American songwriter

- Also known as: Dan Sain
- Born: Daniel Sains; September 22, 1896 (uncertain); Hernando, Mississippi, United States
- Died: February 18, 1956 (aged 59) (uncertain) Memphis, Tennessee, United States
- Genres: Country blues, Memphis blues
- Occupations: Guitarist, songwriter
- Instrument: Guitar
- Labels: Paramount, Victor

Dan Sane (possibly September 22, 1896 – possibly February 18, 1956) was an American Memphis blues and country blues guitarist and songwriter. He was an associate of Frank Stokes. According to the Music journalist Jason Ankeny, "they had emerged among the most complementary duos in all of the blues, with Sane's flatpicking ideally embellished by Stokes' fluid rhythms." The best-known of the songs written by Sane are "Downtown Blues" and "Mr. Crump Don't Like It." His surname was sometimes spelled "Sain". His grandson was the saxophonist Oliver Sain.

== Biography ==
Sane was born Daniel Sains in Hernando, Mississippi. There is uncertainty over his date of birth; most sources state September 22, 1896, but the researchers Bob Eagle and Eric LeBlanc suggest October 23, 1892, or perhaps 1890.

He moved to Memphis, Tennessee, and played in Will Batts's string band, before meeting the guitar player Frank Stokes. Sane and Stokes busked together around Beale Street in Memphis on weekends. During the 1920s the pair performed as a duo, billed as the Beale Street Sheiks, and played in white venues, including country clubs, parties and dances, as members of Jack Kelly's Jug Busters. Their first recording was made for Paramount Records in August 1927, as the Beale Street Sheiks. A National Park Service tourist guide to the blues heritage of the Mississippi Delta says, "The fluid guitar interplay between Stokes and Sane, combined with a propulsive beat, witty lyrics, and Stokes's stentorian voice, make their recordings irresistible."

Sane and Stokes moved to Victor Records in 1928. Their recordings were released under Stokes's name. They recorded a two-part version of "Tain't Nobody's Business if I Do", a song well known in later versions by Bessie Smith and Jimmy Witherspoon, but whose origin lies in the pre-blues era. A locally popular song was "Mr. Crump Don't Like It," whose lyrics referred to E. H. Crump, the mayor of Memphis, and his campaign to clean up less salubrious areas of the city. That song may have been based on an earlier song on the same topic by W. C. Handy. The Sheiks also continued to busk on the streets and play at parties.

In 1929, Stokes and Sane recorded again for Paramount, resuming their billing as the Beale Street Sheiks for a few cuts. These 1929 sides were their last together, although they continued an intermittent performing partnership until Sane's retirement from music in 1952.

In 1933, Sane recorded with the singer and guitarist Jack Kelly (1905–1953) and the fiddler Will Batts (1904–1956), as the South Memphis Jug Band.

== Death and legacy ==
According to most sources, Sane died in Memphis in February 1956, aged 59, but Eagle and LeBlanc state that he died in Osceola, Arkansas, on June 27, 1965.

Sane's recordings as a guitarist are available on numerous compilation albums, including The Best of Frank Stokes (Yazoo Records, 2005).

== See also ==
- List of blues musicians
- List of country blues musicians
- List of Memphis blues musicians
