= Rum Boogie Café =

Music venue in Memphis, Tennessee

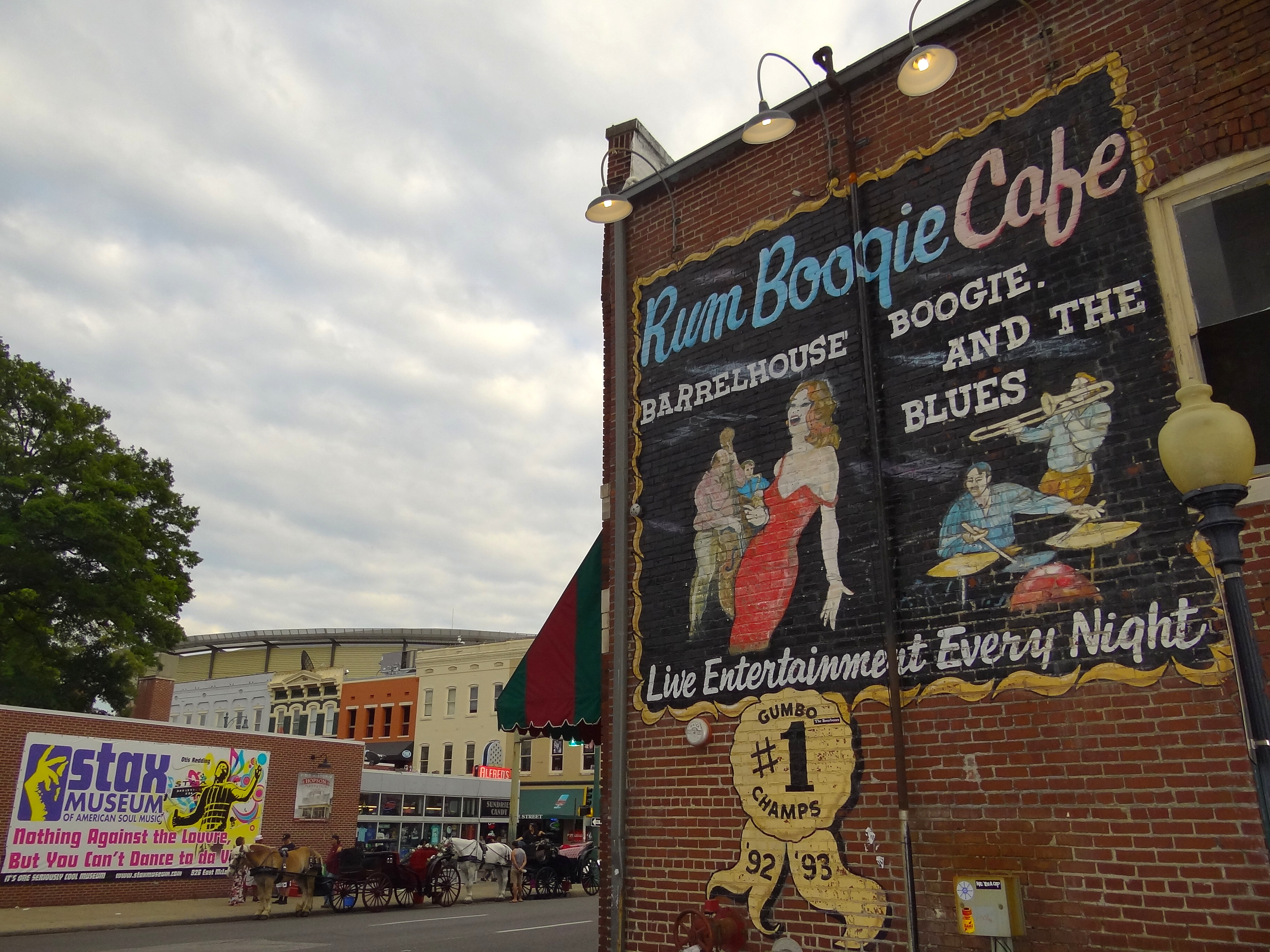

Rum Boogie Café is a night club on Beale Street in Memphis, Tennessee. It is one of the main venues for the International Blues Challenge and is the favored performance location of singer James Govan. It was named "Blues Club of the Year" by the Blues Foundation in 2007.
