= James Oliver (physician) =

First African-American Doctor to attend University of Mississippi Medical Center

James Oliver is a physician from Hernando, Mississippi. He was the first African-American M.D. to graduate from the University of Mississippi Medical Center (UMMC).

In order to pay for college, Oliver worked construction as well as earning a music scholarship to Mississippi Vocational College (MVC) in Itta Bena, Mississippi, now Mississippi Valley State University, where he graduated in 1963. He was the third black student, but the first to graduate from UMMC. Because MVC was not accredited, he could not gain admission to a medical school outside of Mississippi, and UMMC at the time did not accept Black students. Determined to become a doctor, Oliver took additional science courses at the University of Dayton. Next, he joined the army as a researcher at the U.S. Army Biological Warfare Laboratories in Fort Detrick, Maryland while simultaneously taking graduate night courses at the National Institute of Health. Although he was accepted to Penn State, he chose to return to Mississippi to attend UMMC in September 1968. He graduated as a cardiologist in 1972.

He interned at Boston City Hospital on the Harvard Medical Service.
