= From Beale Street to Oblivion =

Studio album by Clutch
- Released: March 20, 2007
- Recorded: October 2006
- Studio: Sound City Studios (Van Nuys, California)
- Genre: Stoner rock; hard rock; blues rock
- Length: 48:18
- Label: DRT Entertainment
- Producer: Joe Barresi

Clutch chronology
Pitchfork & Lost Needles (2005)	From Beale Street to Oblivion (2007)	Full Fathom Five (2008)

Singles from From Beale Street to Oblivion
- 1. "Electric Worry" Released: 2007

From Beale Street to Oblivion is the eighth full-length studio album by American rock band Clutch. It was produced by Joe Barresi (whose credits include The Melvins, Kyuss, Queens of the Stone Age and Coheed and Cambria), and released on the DRT Entertainment label. The album was released on March 20, 2007, and was the second of two Clutch albums to feature keyboardist Mick Schauer.

A reissue of the album was released on July 20, 2010, and Clutch re-released the album as a 2-LP set on purple vinyl, limited to 1,000 copies, for Record Store Day 2015.

== Background ==
The album title comes from a line in the song "The Devil & Me", and is named after the real Beale Street in Memphis, Tennessee. The song "One Eye Dollar" is a remake of the same track from Jam Room. The track "Electric Worry" is a partial cover of the Muddy Waters song "Trouble No More" and features Eric Oblander of Five Horse Johnson on harmonica. It also shares a striking similarity to "Boom Boom" by John Lee Hooker, even including the "Bang Bang Bang Bang" variation he would do live. A music video was produced for the track as well.

== Reception ==
Professional ratings
Review scores
Source	Rating
AllMusic	4/5 stars
Blabbermouth.net	9/10
TheEndlessFeed	8/10

In his four-star review of the album for AllMusic, Greg Prato said "If you long for the days when Soundgarden were still a functioning band, Kyuss were still patrolling the desert, and Black Sabbath had yet to make up with Ozzy, Clutch will definitely not let you down with From Beale Street to Oblivion."

Writing for Blabbermouth.net, Keith Bergman said of the album, " — the band just cooks, with a live revival-tent intensity and more goddamn groove than you can possibly stand without involuntarily bouncing up and down in your chair. Clutch are carrying the flame for real American rock and roll, dumb rock for smart people, road warriors of the highest order and master artisans of the riff and the turn of phrase."

== Track listing ==
All tracks written by Clutch, except where noted.

=== Original album ===
No.	Title	Writer(s)	Length
1.	"You Can't Stop Progress"		2:40
2.	"Power Player"		3:06
3.	"The Devil & Me"		3:57
4.	"White's Ferry"		5:24
5.	"Child of the City"		3:53
6.	"Electric Worry"	Partially written by Mississippi Fred McDowell	5:14
7.	"One Eye Dollar"		1:23
8.	"Rapture of Riddley Walker"		4:09
9.	"When Vegans Attack"		4:56
10.	"Opossum Minister"		4:28
11.	"Black Umbrella"		4:05
12.	"Mr. Shiny Cadillackness"		5:11
Total length:			48:18

=== 2010 deluxe reissue bonus CD listing ===
All tracks written by Clutch, except where noted.

Tracks 1–5 were recorded live at the BBC Maida Vale Studios on November 11, 2006, and tracks 6–9 were recorded on December 13, 2007, in Melbourne, Australia, during the tour for this album.

No.	Title	Writer(s)	Length
1.	"Politician"	Pete Brown	4:25
2.	"Electric Worry"	Partially written by Mississippi Fred McDowell	5:16
3.	"One Eye Dollar"		1:22
4.	"Mr. Shiny Cadillackness"		5:05
5.	"Cypress Grove"		4:27
6.	"The Devil & Me"		3:47
7.	"Child of the City"		3:32
8.	"You Gonna Wreck my Life"	Chester Burnett	5:20
9.	"White's Ferry"		5:42
Total length:			38:57

== Personnel ==
- Neil Fallon – vocals, rhythm guitar
- Tim Sult – lead guitar
- Dan Maines – bass
- Jean-Paul Gaster – drums, percussion
- Mick Schauer – Hammond B3, piano, Hohner Clavinet
- Bryan Hinkley – guitar on tracks 4 and 12
- Eric Oblander – Hohner harmonicas on tracks 6, 11 and 12

=== Production ===
- Produced, recorded and mixed by 'Evil' Joe Barresi at Sound City Studios, Van Nuys, California, and Bay 7, Valley Village, California
- Additional engineering by Pete Martinez
- Assistant engineering at Bay 7 by Glen Pittman
- Art and design by Nick Lakiotes
- Photography by Louis Rivera

== Charts ==
Chart (2007)	Peak position
UK Albums (OCC)	112
Norwegian Albums (VG-lista)	39
US Billboard 200	52
