= A. Schwab's =

- A. Schwab
- U.S. Historic district – Contributing property
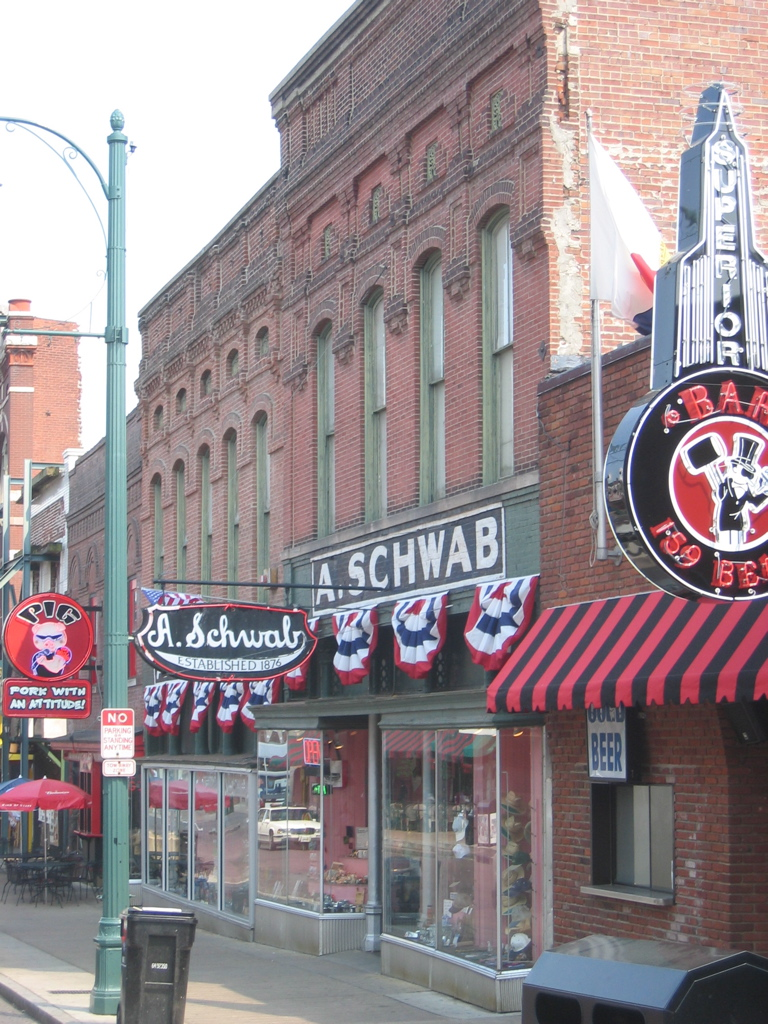
- A. Schwab

- Location within Tennessee Location within the United States
- Location: 163 Beale Street
- Coordinates: 35.139542°N 90.052697°W
- Built: 1876
- Architectural style: Italianate (brick) with modified first floor
- Part of: Beale Street Historic District (ID66000731)
- Designated CP: October 15, 1966

A. Schwab Dry Goods Store is the sole remaining original business on Beale Street in Memphis, Tennessee.

== History ==
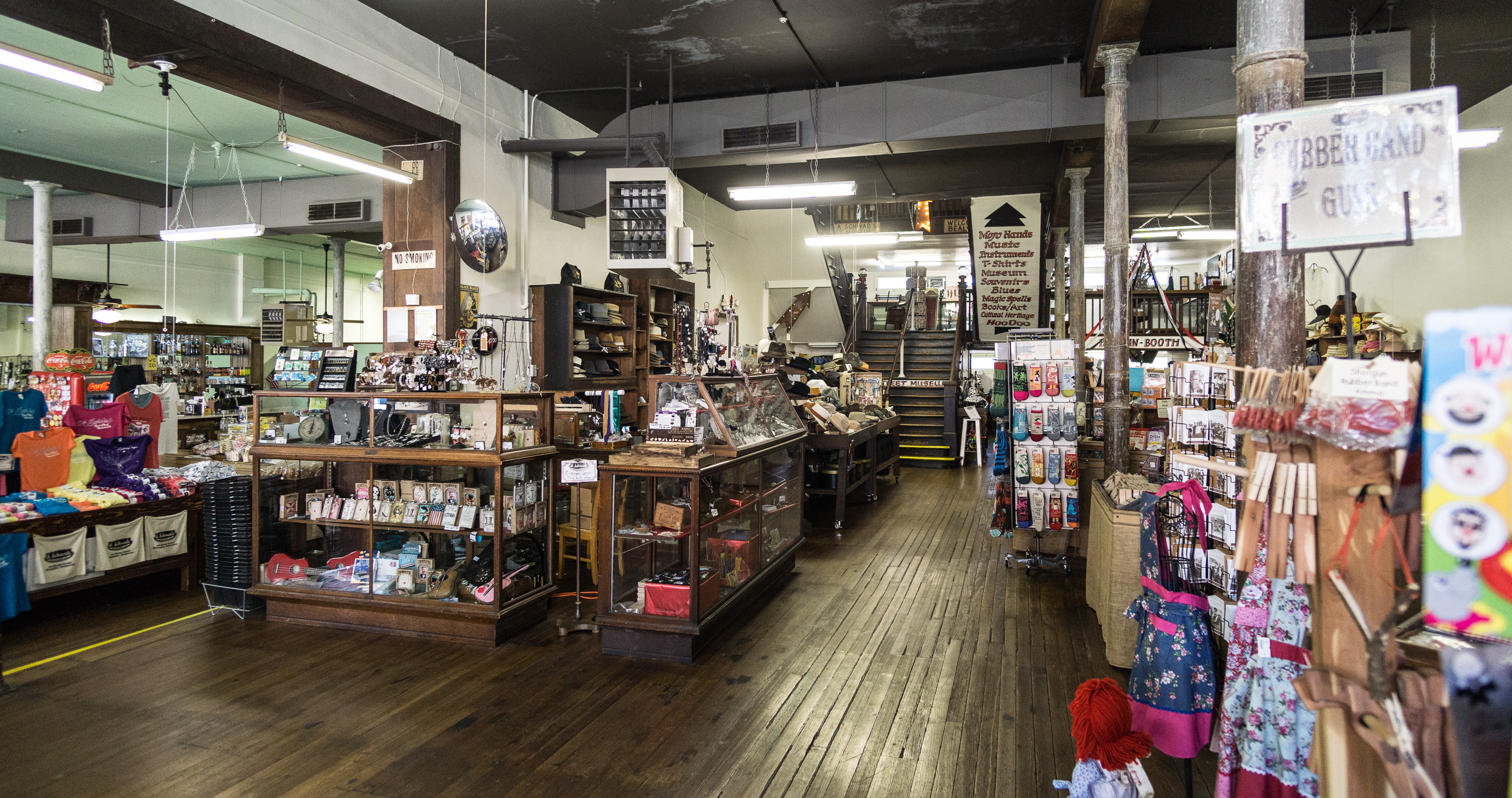
Schwab's interior

A. Schwab Dry Goods Store was established in 1876 by Abraham Joseph Schwab, an Alsatian Jewish immigrant, who fled to the United States to escape German enlistment during the Franco-Prussian War. After arriving in Memphis, Schwab joined the Hirsch family and opened A. Schwab Dry Goods Store, selling men's shoes and boots under the name "Hirsch, Schwab & Co" at 66 Beale. A. Schwab's was also the retailer of the largest overalls in the world which sold two pair a year. Over the next decade, Hirsch, Schwab, & Co would expand its services into clothing, hardware, and home appliances before the families split in 1886.

Following the split, Schwab would continue independently, moving to 149 Beale under the current name of A. Schwab. In 1911, the business was passed along to his sons, Sam, Elias, and Leo, who moved the shop to the first floor of its current address at 163 Beale. The new storefront was inherited by Sam's daughter, Eleanor Schwab Braslow, and Elias's son, Abram Schwab. Eleanor would keep the books and maintain A. Schwab's stock, while Abram would act as the business's public face. The two expanded the shop to its current size in 1924, buying the second floor of their building and the adjacent storefront, 165 Beale, which had previously been one of the original Piggly Wiggly grocery stores. Elanor and Abram also began a line of Schwab's hygiene products trademarked in 1924 under the name "Schwab's Nature" selling soaps and face wash through their store and other local pharmacies.

Today, it is a local tourist attraction. On the balcony mezzanine is the Beale Street Museum, a collection of Beale Street memorabilia, along with several items and records of the Schwab family. The second floor is an event venue and houses the hoodoo items and musical goods. The first floor sells quirky merchandise and tourist memorabilia while what used to be the next-door shop has been converted into an ice-cream bar.

A. Schwab was the oldest store in the Mid-South, located in the oldest remaining building on Beale Street. After 136 years of ownership, the Schwab family sold the business at the end of 2011.
