= Felix LaBauve House =

- Felix Labauve House
- U.S. National Register of Historic Places
- Mississippi Landmark
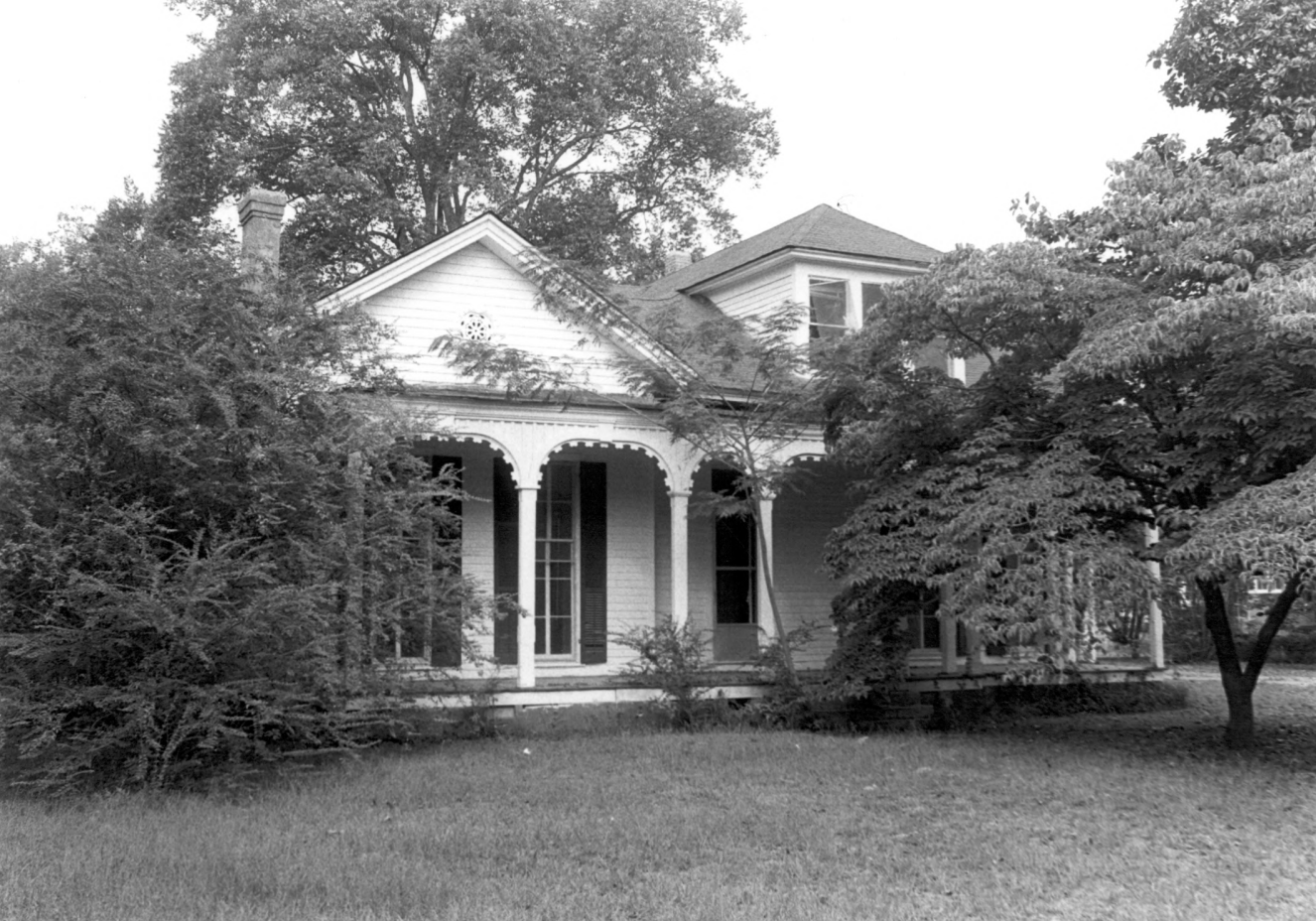
- Felix Labauve House in September 1977

- Location within Mississippi
- Location: 2769 Magnolia Drive; Hernando, DeSoto County, Mississippi, U.S.
- Coordinates: 34°49′11″N 89°59′23″W
- Built: c. 1865
- NRHP reference No.: 78003074
- USMS No.: 033-HER-0116-NR-ML-NRD

Significant dates
- Added to NRHP: March 29, 1978
- Designated USMS: October 11, 1985

The Felix LaBauve House is a historic house built in c. 1865 and located at 2769 Magnolia Drive (formerly 235 Magnolia Drive) in Hernando, Mississippi, U.S. It is listed on the National Register of Historic Places since March 29, 1978 for its architecture and social significance; and it is a listed Mississippi Landmark since October 11, 1985. It is alternatively spelled as Felix Labauve House.

== History ==
The Felix LaBauve House was the home of Felix LaBauve (1809–1879), a French émigré and early settler to Mississippi. LaBauve was a community leader and newspaper publisher. He was nicknamed "the father of scholarships in Mississippi" because he bequeath an endowment of US$20,000 to the University of Mississippi, for the explicit purpose of establishing a permanent scholarship for orphaned boys from DeSoto County, Mississippi. The scholarship is no longer in existence, but he left a lasting legacy. In 1976, the former LaBauve property was donated to the city of Hernando, with the goal of preservation.. The house became designated as a Mississippi Landmark on October 11, 1985.

The building is a single-story frame house built in c. 1865, it is located at its original site (which had an address change over the years) and the structure has been altered. The house is a Victorian-style cottage, which has a distinct style of porch and lacy gable.

== See also ==
- National Register of Historic Places listings in DeSoto County, Mississippi
