= Felix LaBauve =

French-born American early settler and community leader in Mississippi (1809–1879)

Member of the Mississippi Senate
- In office 1846–1848

Personal details
- Born: November 16, 1809 Vouziers, Grand Est, France
- Died: June 12, 1879 (aged 69)
- Resting place: Hernando Memorial Park, Hernando, Mississippi, U.S.
- Occupation: Politician, businessperson, community leader, newspaper founder, newspaper editor, and philanthropist

Felix LaBauve (1809–1879) was a French-born American politician, businessperson, newspaper publisher, newspaper editor, early settler, and community leader in DeSoto County, Mississippi. He was a former member of the Mississippi State Senate serving from 1846 to 1848. LaBauve was also a philanthropist and is believed to be the first person to establish a scholarship program at a Mississippi state-supported institution of higher learning.

His former home, the Felix LaBauve House is listed as a Mississippi Landmark, and on the National Register of Historic Places. His name is alternatively spelled as Felix Labauve and Felix La Bauve.

== Early life and family ==
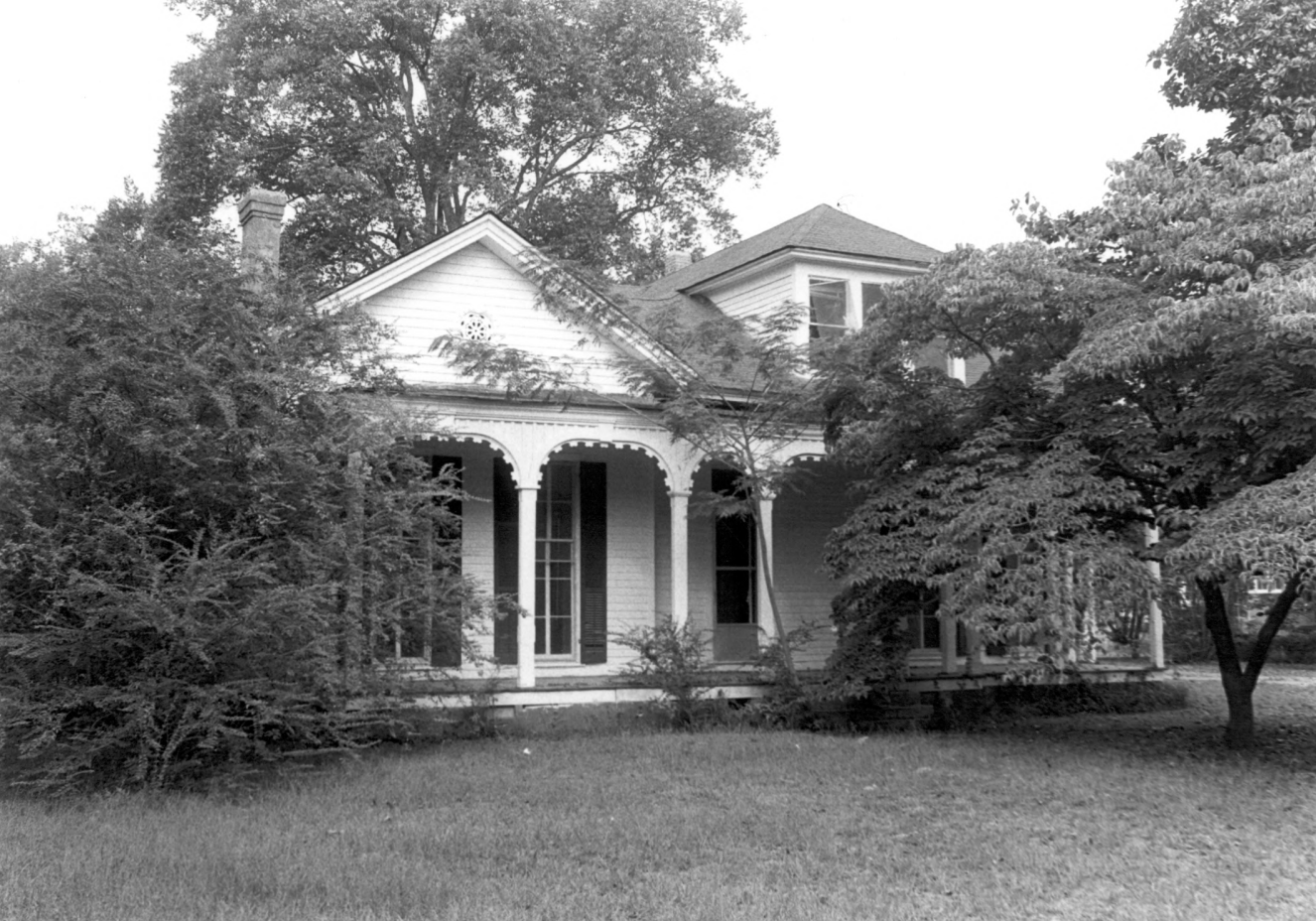
Felix LaBauve House (1977) in Hernando, Mississippi

Felix LaBauve was born on November 16, 1809, in Vouziers, France. His father of the same name, Felix LaBauve (1741–1815) was a professional soldier for the French Royal Army for Comte de Rochambeau at Yorktown during the 1781 military campaign of the American Revolutionary War and later with Napoleon Bonaparte.

== Career ==
LaBauve moved to DeSoto County, Mississippi in 1836, during the point the county was being founded. He initially founded a mercantile, trading calico textiles, beads, and blankets with local Native Americans.

LaBauve had political aspirations and was a vocal supporter of Democratic philosophy, he joined the Hernando town council in 1839. In the same year 1839, he founded the newspaper the DeSoto Times Tribune (formerly The Hernando Free Press and States Rights Democrat) in the city of Hernando, Mississippi. In 1841, he had launched another county newspaper, The Phenix (sometimes written as The Phoenix, and known as Peoples Press by 1859). By 1859, the DeSoto Times Tribune closed due to financial issues; however it has been considered a forerunner to the DeSoto Times–Tribune which is still in print.

LaBauve was a former member of the Mississippi State Senate serving from 1846 to 1848 in DeSoto, Washington, Coahoma, Sunflower, Tunica, Bolivar, and Issaquena counties.

During the American Civil War, LaBauve was too old to fight but he aided the Confederate States Army war effort, and was said to have captured four Union Army soldiers by himself. In 1878, he served as an honorary Commissioner representing his state and county at the International Industrial Exposition in Paris.

== Death and legacy ==
LaBauve died on June 12, 1879 and is buried at Hernando Memorial Park Cemetery. He bequeathed an endowment of US $20,000 and in 1879 established 'The Felix Labauve Scholarship' at the University of Mississippi for the explicit purpose of establishing a permanent scholarship for orphaned boys from DeSoto County, Mississippi. The scholarship is no longer in existence, but he left a lasting legacy. He had also willed multiple tracts of land to the Roman Catholic Church in Natchez, Mississippi, with the stipulation of creating a "Roman Catholic Chapel" in Hernando and a cemetery where he would be interred.

In 1976, the former LaBauve House in Hernando was donated to the city, with the goal of preservation. It is listed on the National Register of Historic Places. The University of Mississippi Libraries holds the 'Felix LaBauve Collection' in the archives.
