= Beale Street =

Street in Memphis, Tennessee, United States

- Beale Street Historic District
- U.S. National Register of Historic Places
- U.S. National Historic Landmark District
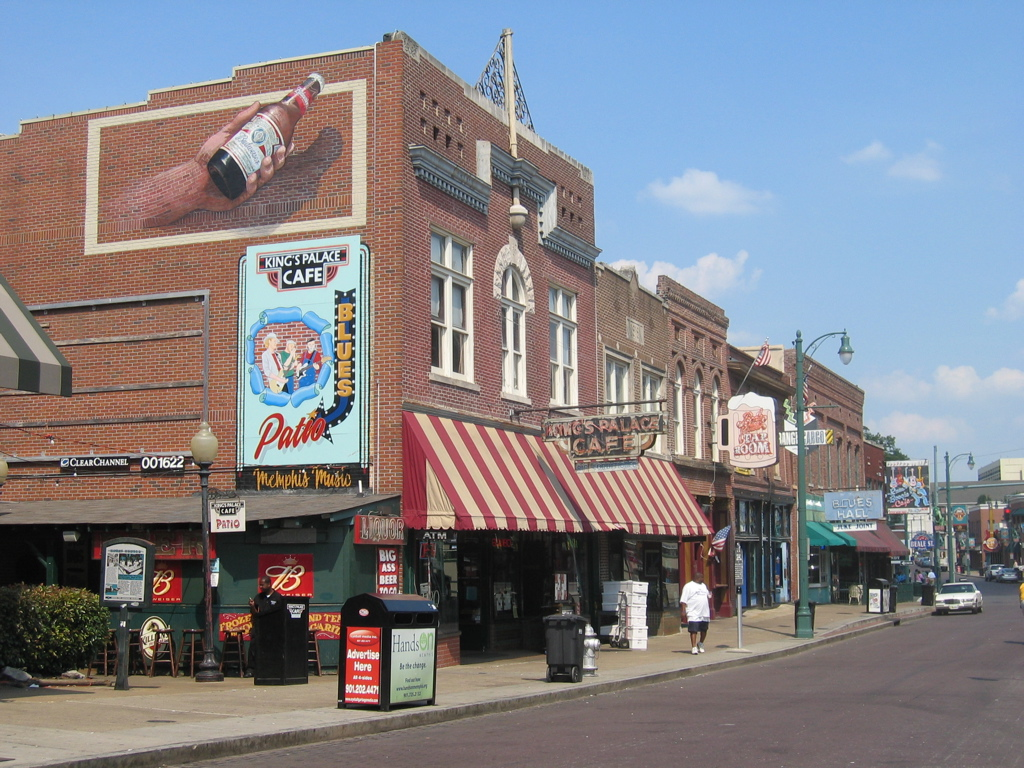
- Beale Street, showing King’s Palace Cafe, Beale St. Tap Room, and Mr. Handy’s Blues Hall.

- Location within Tennessee Location within the United States
- Interactive map of Beale Street Historic District
- Location: Memphis, Tennessee
- Coordinates: 35°8′22″N 90°3′7″W
- Area: 27 acres (10.927 ha)
- Built: 1900
- Architectural style: Late 19th and 20th century revivals, late 19th and early 20th century American movements
- NRHP reference No.: 66000731 (original); 92001581 (increase)

Significant dates
- Added to NRHP: October 15, 1966
- Boundary increase: July 29, 1993
- Designated NHLD: May 23, 1966

Beale Street is a street in Downtown Memphis, Tennessee, which runs from the Mississippi River to East Street, a distance of approximately 1.8 miles (2.9 km). It is a significant location in the city's history, as well as in the history of blues music. Today, the blues clubs and restaurants that line Beale Street are major tourist attractions in Memphis. Festivals and outdoor concerts frequently bring large crowds to the street and its surrounding areas.

== History ==
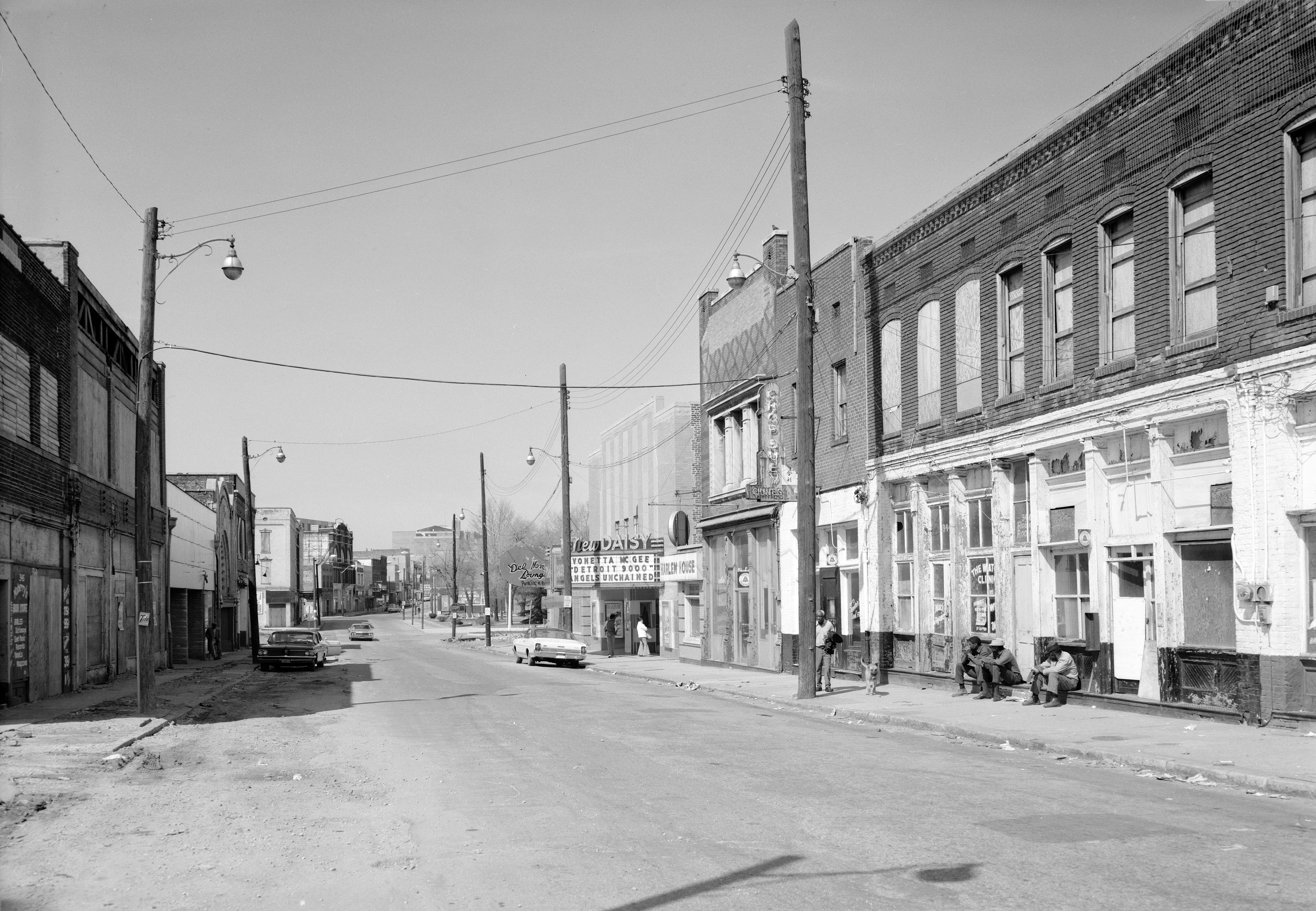
Beale Street in 1974

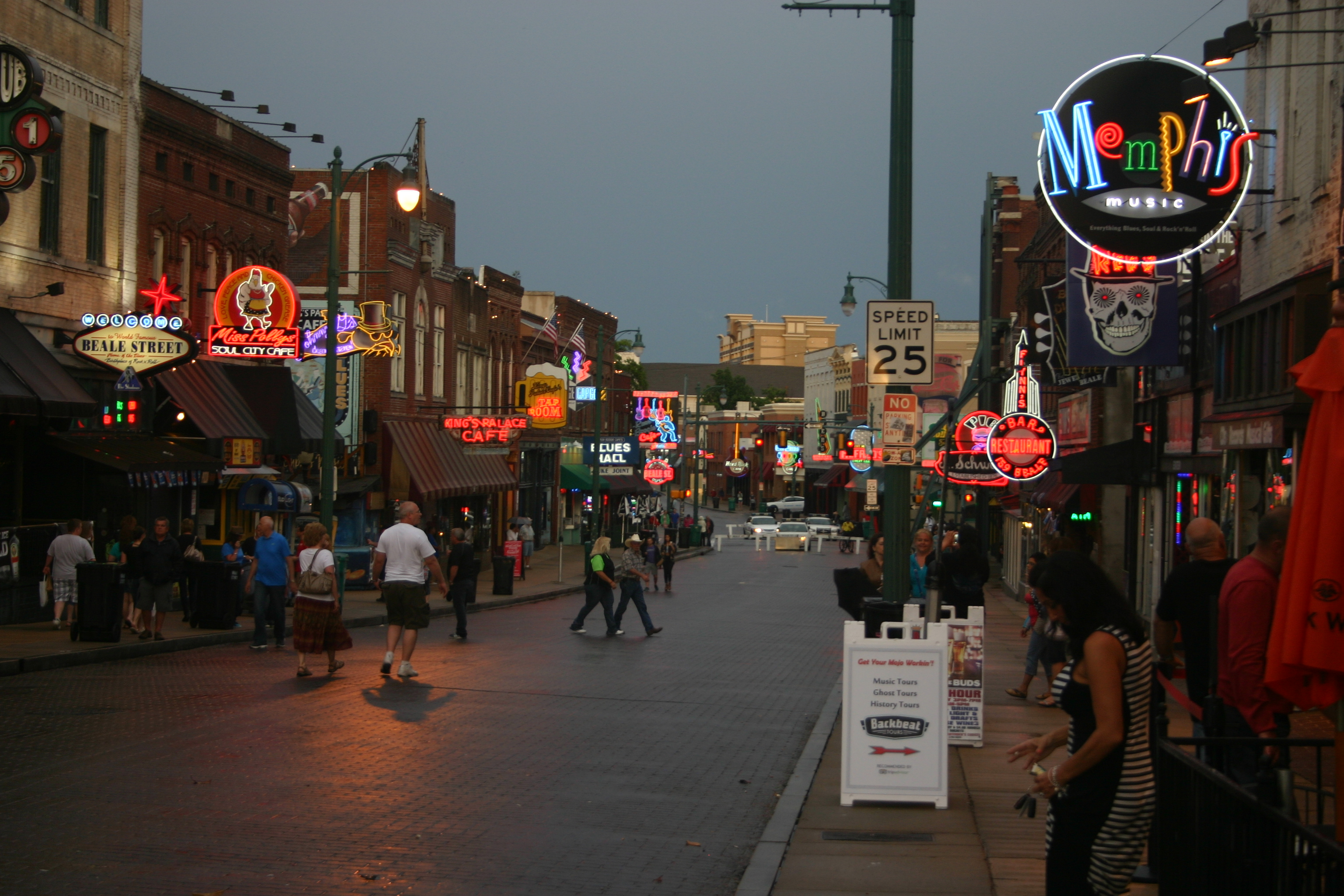
Beale Street in 2014

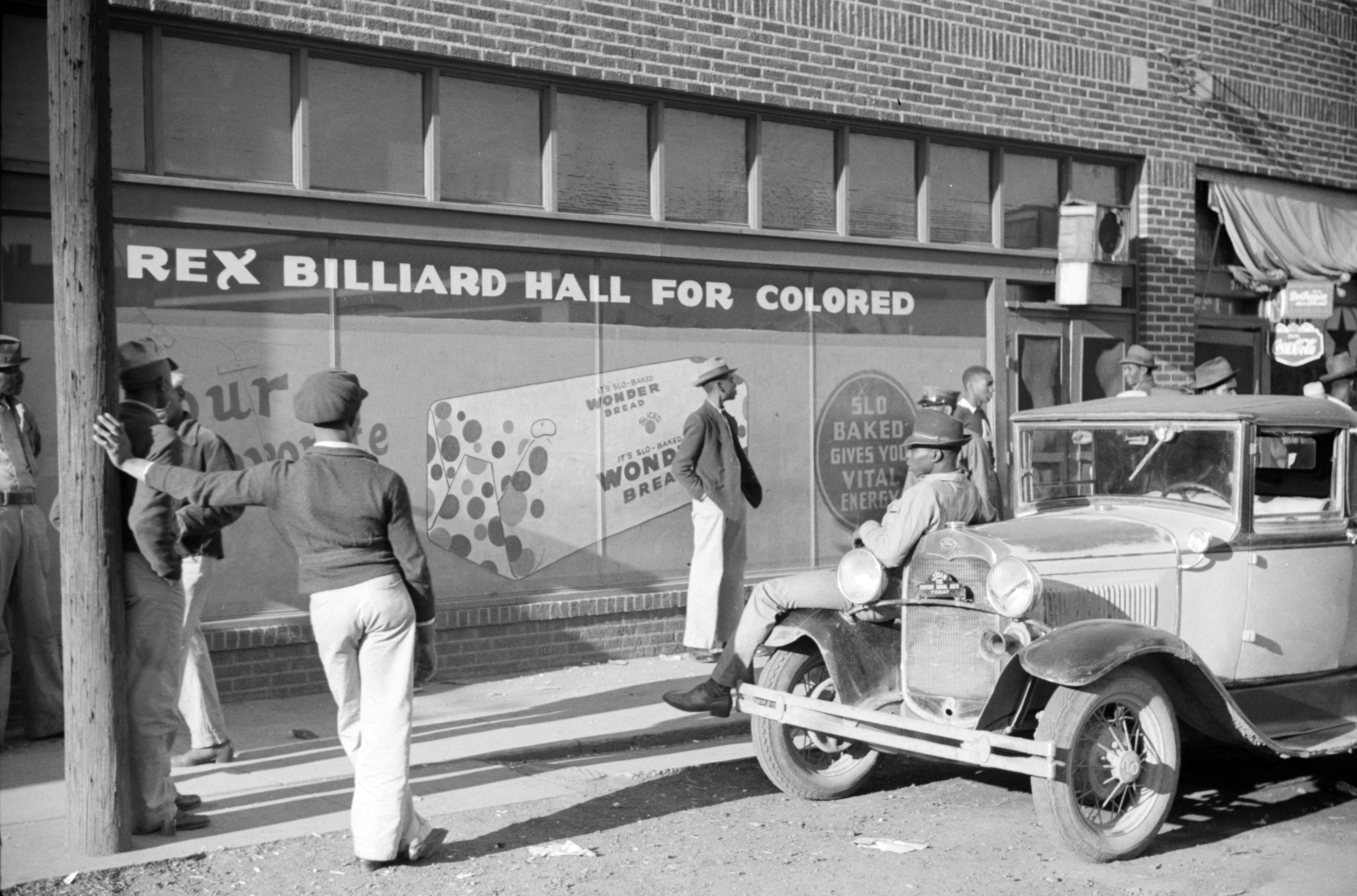
Rex Billiard Hall for Colored, Beale Street, 1939. Photo by Marion Post Wolcott.

Beale Street was created in 1841 by entrepreneur and developer Robertson Topp (1807–1876), who soon named it later in the decade for Edward Fitzgerald Beale, a military hero from the Mexican–American War. (The original name was Beale Avenue.) Its western end primarily housed shops of trade merchants, who traded goods with ships along the Mississippi River, while the eastern part developed as an affluent suburb. In the 1860s, many black traveling musicians began performing on Beale. The first of these to call Beale Street home were the Young Men's Brass Band, who were formed by Sam Thomas in 1867.

In the 1870s, the population of Memphis was rocked by a series of yellow fever epidemics, leading the city to forfeit its charter in 1879. During this time, Robert Church purchased land around Beale Street that eventually led to his becoming the first black millionaire from the south. In 1890, Beale Street underwent renovation with the addition of the Grand Opera House, later known as the Orpheum. In 1899, Church paid for the city to create Church's Park near the corner of 4th and Beale. It became a recreational and cultural center, where blues musicians could gather. A major attraction of the park was an auditorium that could seat 2,000 people. Speakers at the Church Park Auditorium included Woodrow Wilson, Booker T. Washington, and Franklin D. Roosevelt.

At the corner of 4th and Beale, adjacent to the park, is Beale Street Baptist Church. It is Tennessee's oldest surviving African American Church edifice built beginning in 1869, was also important in the early civil rights movement in Memphis. In 1889, NAACP co-founder Ida B. Wells was a co-owner and editor of an anti-segregationist paper called Free Speech based on Beale before her presses were destroyed by a white mob.

In the early 1900s, Beale Street was filled with many clubs, restaurants and shops, many of them owned by African-Americans. In 1903, Mayor Thornton was looking for a music teacher for his Knights of Pythias Band and called Tuskegee Institute to talk to his friend, Booker T. Washington, who recommended a trumpet player in Clarksdale, Mississippi named W. C. Handy. Mayor Thornton contacted Handy, and Memphis became the home of the musician who created the "Blues on Beale Street". Mayor Thornton and his three sons also played in Handy's band.

In 1909, W. C. Handy wrote "Mr. Crump" as a campaign song for political machine leader E. H. Crump. The song was later renamed "The Memphis Blues." Handy also wrote a song called "Beale Street Blues" in 1916 which influenced the change of the street's name from Beale Avenue to Beale Street. From the 1920s to the 1940s, Louis Armstrong, Muddy Waters, Albert King, Memphis Minnie, B. B. King, Rufus Thomas, Rosco Gordon and other blues and jazz legends played on Beale Street and helped develop the style known as Memphis Blues. As a young man, B. B. King was billed as "the Beale Street Blues Boy." One of Handy's proteges on Beale Street was the young Walter Furry Lewis, who later became a well known blues musician. In his later years Lewis lived near Fourth and Beale, and in 1969 was recorded there in his apartment by Memphis music producer Terry Manning.

In 1934, local community leader George Washington Lee authored Beale Street: Where the Blues Began; the first book by a black author to be advertised in the Book of the Month Club News.

In 1938, Lewis O. Swingler, editor of the Memphis World Newspaper, a Negro newspaper, in an effort to increase circulation, conceived the idea of a "Mayor of Beale St.," having readers vote for the person of their choice. Matthew Thornton Sr., a well-known community leader, active in political, civic and social affairs and one of the charter members of the Memphis Branch of the NAACP, won the contest against nine opponents and received 12,000 of the 33,000 votes cast. Mr. Thornton was the original "Mayor of Beale St." an honorary position that he retained until he died in 1963 at the age of 90.

One notable white musician who drew inspiration from the music of Beale Street was Elvis Presley.

By the 1960s, Beale had fallen on hard times and many businesses closed, even though the section of the street from Main to 4th was declared a National Historic Landmark on May 23, 1966. On December 15, 1977, Beale Street was officially declared the "Home of the Blues" by an act of Congress. Despite national recognition of its historic significance, Beale was a virtual ghost town after a disastrous urban renewal program that razed blocks of buildings in the surrounding neighborhood, as well as a number of buildings on Beale Street.

In 1973, the Beale Street Development Corporation (BSDC) was formed by George B. Miller and others as a racially diverse, cooperative effort for the redevelopment of Beale Street. The corporation was selected by the City of Memphis to participate in the redevelopment of the blocks on Beale between Second and Fourth streets in August, 1978. The corporation dedicated its efforts to the success of the Beale Street project for the preservation of the street's rich history, and to its cultural as well as physical development. The BSDC secured $5.2 million in grants for the renovation of Beale Street.

The documentary Beale Street (1981) explores the residential, business, political, and musical history of Beale Street in Memphis, Tennessee from the 1920's to the early 1960's, through interviews (B.B. King, the Hooks Brothers, Bobby Blue Bland, Prince Gabe, Maurice "Fess" Hulbert, Nat D. Williams, Rufus Thomas, Ma Rainey II and others), archival footage, and still photographs. Co-directed by Alexis Krasilovsky, Ann Rickey, and Walter Baldwin.

In 1982, the City of Memphis recommended that the BSDC hire a management company led by John A. Elkington to assist in the development of the street by securing new tenants, collecting rents and handling certain maintenance and security issues. Each new lease had to be agreed upon by BSDC, the City of Memphis and the management company, Performa.

The day-to-day management of Beale Street was turned over to the City of Memphis in an October, 2012 court decision after a long legal dispute involving the city, BSDC and Performa.

During the first weekend of May (sometimes including late April), the Beale Street Music Festival brings major music acts from a variety of musical genres to Tom Lee Park at the end of Beale Street on the Mississippi River. The festival is the kickoff event of a month of festivities citywide known as Memphis in May.

In 2020, in Memphis, the Beale Street Historic District and the WDIA radio station were added to the U.S. Civil Rights Trail.

== Attractions ==
- Blues City Cafe & the Band Box (138-142 Beale)
- Blues City General Store (144 Beale)
- B. B. King's Blues Club (143 Beale)
- Memphis Music (149 Beale)
- Club 152 (152 Beale)
- The Shadows - 3rd floor of Club 152 (152 Beale)
- Walking Pants Curiosities (151-153-155 Beale Street)
- Alley Katz (156 Beale)
- King Jerry Lawler's Hall of Fame Bar & Grille (159 Beale)
- King's Palace Cafe (162 Beale)
- A. Schwab's (163 Beale)
- The Pig (167 Beale)
- Beale Street Tap Room (168 Beale)
- The Black Diamond (153 Beale)
- Johnny G's Creole Kitchen (156 Beale)
- Strange Cargo (172 Beale)
- Rum Boogie Café (182 Beale)
- Silky O'Sullivan's (183 Beale)
- FedExForum (191 Beale)
- Memphis Rock 'n' Soul Museum (191 Beale)
- Alfred's on Beale (197 Beale)
- Beale Street Blues Gifts (200 Beale)
- Dyer's Famous Hamburgers (205 Beale)
- Wet Willies (209 Beale)
- People's Billiard Club (323 Beale)
- Coyote Ugly (326 Beale)
- Historic Daisy Theatre (329 Beale)
- The New Daisy Theatre (330 Beale)
- Mr. Handy's Blues Hall
- Eel Etc. Fashions (333 Beale)
- Withers Collection Museum and Gallery (333 Beale)
- Jerry Lee Lewis' Cafe and Honky Tonk (310 Beale)
- Lil Anthony's Cafe (341 Beale)
- W.C. Handy historic home (352 Beale)
- The Beale Street Flippers

== Musical references ==
- A 1920s blues duo, Beale Street Sheiks, comprising Frank Stokes and Dan Sane
- The song "Beale Street Blues", written by W. C. Handy, contains the oldest known references to Beale Street.
- Joni Mitchell's song "Furry Sings the Blues" is a lamentation of the redevelopment of Beale Street in the late 1960s. It references W. C. Handy and both the Old and The New Daisy Theatres, among others.
- Cab Calloway's song "Beale Street Mama" is all about Beale Street.
- Todd Agnew's song "My Jesus" says that the singer thinks Jesus would prefer Beale Street to the stained glass crowd. Agnew's song "On a Corner in Memphis" also references Beale Street.
- Marc Cohn's 1991 single "Walking in Memphis" includes the lyric "walking with my feet ten feet off of Beale" in the chorus.
- Eric Church's 2015 song Mr. Misunderstood featured the lyric "Every soul on Beale Street danced".
- Arkells 2016 song "Drake's Dad" featured the lyric "We were rolling down Beale street/In the Tennessee summer heat".
- Self's song "Sophomore Jinx", a critique of the music industry, mentions "all the blues down on Beale".
- Jimmie Rodgers' "Standing on the Corner (Blue Yodel No. 9)" references the "corner of Beale and Main".
- Jimmy Buffett song “Cinco de Mayo in Memphis” featured the lyric “Meanwhile down on Beale Street”.
- Bette Midler's song "Midnight in Memphis", from the 1979 film The Rose: "Runnin' down on Beale Street. Can you hear that engine roar".
- John Lee Hooker's 1952 song "Walkin' The Boogie (Alternate Take)": "I was walkin' down Beale Street".
- Clutch's song "The Devil & Me", on the album From Beale Street to Oblivion, contains a reference to Beale Street.
- In 2002, David Nail's song "Memphis"' music video featured images of Memphis.
- Beginning in the year 1987, local band FreeWorld, led by Richard Cushing and featuring prominent saxophonist, Herman Green, is the longest, continuously performing band in Beale Street's history.
- The Guy Clark 2006 song "Cinco de Mayo in Memphis", on his album Workbench Songs includes the lyrics, "Meanwhile down on Beale Street / Drinking in a Beale Street bar".

== See also ==
- List of National Historic Landmarks in Tennessee
- National Register of Historic Places listings in Shelby County, Tennessee

== General sources ==
- Guralnick, Peter (1994). Last Train to Memphis: The Rise of Elvis Presley. Little, Brown. ISBN 978-0-316-33225-5.
