= Hernando, Mississippi =

- City
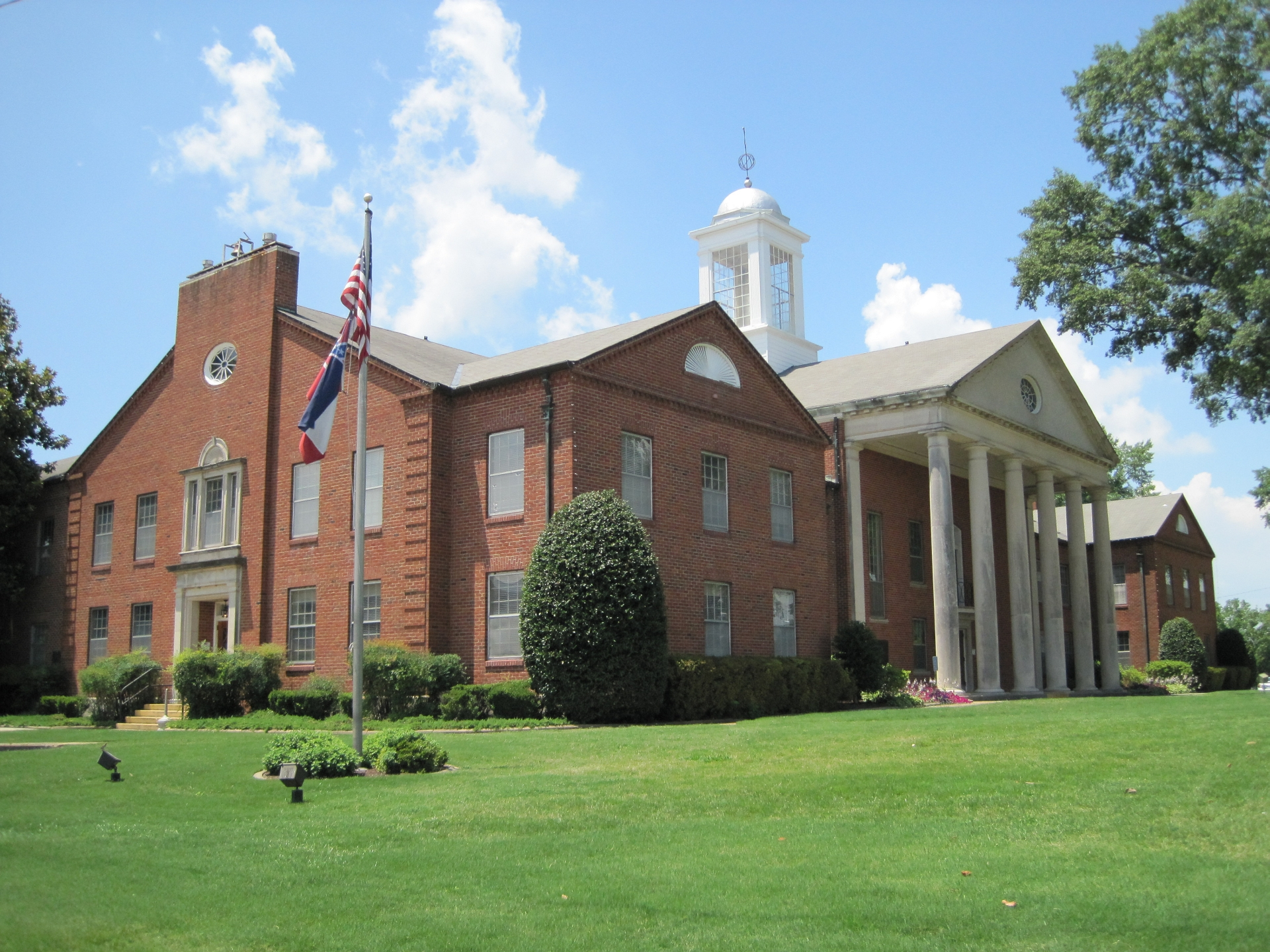
- DeSoto County Courthouse in Hernando

- Flag Seal

- Location within DeSoto County and Mississippi
- Coordinates: 34°51′50″N 90°00′20″W
- Country: United States
- State: Mississippi
- County: DeSoto
- Founded: 1839

Government
  - Mayor: Chip Johnson (R)

Area
  - Total: 25.39 sq mi (65.76 km^{2})
  - Land: 25.30 sq mi (65.53 km^{2})
  - Water: 0.089 sq mi (0.23 km^{2})
- Elevation: 305 ft (93 m)

Population (2020)
  - Total: 17,138
  - Density: 677.4/sq mi (261.54/km^{2})
- Time zone: UTC-6 (Central (CST))
  - Summer (DST): UTC-5 (CDT)
- ZIP Code: 38632
- Area code: 662
- FIPS code: 28-31780
- GNIS ID: 2404688
- Website: www.cityofhernando.org

Hernando is a city in and the county seat of DeSoto County, on the northwestern border of Mississippi, United States. The population was 17,138 according to the 2020 census records. It is located on the south side of the Memphis, Tennessee metro area. U.S. Route 51 and the I-55 freeway traverse the city from north to south, and the I-69 freeway crosses the city from east to west. The county courthouse is located within Hernando's historic downtown square. It is located at the intersection of Commerce Street and present-day U.S. 51.

== History ==
=== Early history ===
At the time of encounters by French and Spanish colonists, the Chickasaw people had long inhabited this area. France had developed colonial settlements along the Gulf Coast, to the north on the middle Mississippi River in what was called the Illinois Country, and in New France (present-day Quebec in Canada). An 18th-century French colonial log house (see first photo in gallery below) in Hernando is a reminder of typical dwellings built in their settlements in the Illinois country, such as in Ste. Genevieve, Missouri. The French and French Canadians had a wide trading network with various American Indian tribes along this river, for instance, in Natchez.

=== 19th and 20th centuries ===
Following the Indian Removal Act in 1830 and under pressure from the United States, the Chickasaw finally signed a treaty to cede most of their lands in this area to the US. Most of the tribe were removed to west of the Mississippi River in Indian Territory.

This town was first called Jefferson by its new European American settlers. It was renamed as Hernando in 1832, after the Spanish explorer Hernando de Soto. He was the first European to explore the Mississippi River.

During the early 20th century, numerous blues musicians developed in Hernando. African Americans had developed a strong musical tradition in areas along the Mississippi River, where many had grown up in families working as sharecroppers on cotton plantations. During the Great Migration of the first half of the 20th century, many blues musicians migrated north, taking their music to Chicago and helping create the culture of that city.

=== 21st century ===
Hernando, Mississippi, has experienced significant growth in the 21st century, enhancing its economy and preserving its history. The completion of I-269 boosted local jobs and investments, attracting major companies. Ongoing residential and commercial developments, including a new high school and entertainment district, support Hernando’s appeal as a suburban community. Hernando is a Preserve America and Main Street Community, featuring a Farmers Market with local produce, crafts, live music, and programs like Children's POP Day and Senior Days, accepting SNAP benefits.

== Geography ==
Hernando is in the center of DeSoto County, bordered to the north by the city of Southaven. Via Interstate 55 or US 51, Memphis, Tennessee is 25 miles (40 km) north. It is 15 miles (24 km) via the same road to the south to Senatobia. According to the United States Census Bureau, the city of Hernando has a total area of 25.8 square miles (66.9 km^{2}), of which 25.7 square miles (66.6 km^{2}) is land, and 0.1 square miles (0.3 km^{2}), or 0.39%, is water.

=== Climate ===
The climate in this area is characterized by hot, humid summers and generally mild to cool winters. According to the Köppen Climate Classification system, Hernando has a humid subtropical climate, abbreviated "Cfa" on climate maps.

Climate data for Hernando, Mississippi, 1991–2020 normals, extremes 1893–present
| Month | Jan | Feb | Mar | Apr | May | Jun | Jul | Aug | Sep | Oct | Nov | Dec | Year |
|---|---|---|---|---|---|---|---|---|---|---|---|---|---|
| Record high °F (°C) | 80 (27) | 83 (28) | 91 (33) | 97 (36) | 98 (37) | 104 (40) | 110 (43) | 112 (44) | 106 (41) | 99 (37) | 88 (31) | 81 (27) | 112 (44) |
| Mean maximum °F (°C) | 70.0 (21.1) | 73.9 (23.3) | 80.0 (26.7) | 86.3 (30.2) | 90.8 (32.7) | 95.5 (35.3) | 97.3 (36.3) | 98.2 (36.8) | 95.6 (35.3) | 88.7 (31.5) | 79.2 (26.2) | 70.9 (21.6) | 99.3 (37.4) |
| Mean daily maximum °F (°C) | 49.7 (9.8) | 53.9 (12.2) | 62.9 (17.2) | 72.4 (22.4) | 80.3 (26.8) | 87.5 (30.8) | 90.1 (32.3) | 90.3 (32.4) | 85.1 (29.5) | 74.0 (23.3) | 61.6 (16.4) | 52.0 (11.1) | 71.6 (22.0) |
| Daily mean °F (°C) | 40.0 (4.4) | 43.7 (6.5) | 52.0 (11.1) | 61.2 (16.2) | 69.9 (21.1) | 77.4 (25.2) | 80.4 (26.9) | 79.8 (26.6) | 73.7 (23.2) | 62.2 (16.8) | 50.7 (10.4) | 42.9 (6.1) | 61.2 (16.2) |
| Mean daily minimum °F (°C) | 30.2 (−1.0) | 33.5 (0.8) | 41.1 (5.1) | 50.1 (10.1) | 59.6 (15.3) | 67.2 (19.6) | 70.7 (21.5) | 69.3 (20.7) | 62.4 (16.9) | 50.4 (10.2) | 39.8 (4.3) | 33.8 (1.0) | 50.7 (10.4) |
| Mean minimum °F (°C) | 13.4 (−10.3) | 18.5 (−7.5) | 23.6 (−4.7) | 34.3 (1.3) | 46.1 (7.8) | 56.8 (13.8) | 62.6 (17.0) | 61.1 (16.2) | 48.3 (9.1) | 34.5 (1.4) | 24.5 (−4.2) | 19.4 (−7.0) | 11.4 (−11.4) |
| Record low °F (°C) | −12 (−24) | −5 (−21) | 10 (−12) | 23 (−5) | 37 (3) | 47 (8) | 54 (12) | 49 (9) | 38 (3) | 24 (−4) | 7 (−14) | −5 (−21) | −12 (−24) |
| Average precipitation inches (mm) | 4.22 (107) | 5.04 (128) | 5.52 (140) | 6.25 (159) | 5.49 (139) | 4.80 (122) | 4.14 (105) | 3.40 (86) | 3.48 (88) | 4.11 (104) | 4.25 (108) | 5.83 (148) | 56.53 (1,436) |
| Average snowfall inches (cm) | 0.9 (2.3) | 0.7 (1.8) | 0.1 (0.25) | 0.0 (0.0) | 0.0 (0.0) | 0.0 (0.0) | 0.0 (0.0) | 0.0 (0.0) | 0.0 (0.0) | 0.0 (0.0) | 0.1 (0.25) | 0.1 (0.25) | 1.9 (4.8) |
| Average precipitation days (≥ 0.01 in) | 10.1 | 9.7 | 11.1 | 9.4 | 10.5 | 9.6 | 9.1 | 7.2 | 6.4 | 7.3 | 8.8 | 10.3 | 109.5 |
| Average snowy days (≥ 0.1 in) | 0.5 | 0.4 | 0.1 | 0.0 | 0.0 | 0.0 | 0.0 | 0.0 | 0.0 | 0.0 | 0.0 | 0.2 | 1.2 |
Source 1: NOAA
Source 2: National Weather Service

== Demographics ==
Historical population
| Census | Pop. | Note | %± |
|---|---|---|---|
| 1870 | 730 | | — |
| 1880 | 583 | | −20.1% |
| 1890 | 602 | | 3.3% |
| 1900 | 563 | | −6.5% |
| 1910 | 600 | | 6.6% |
| 1920 | 796 | | 32.7% |
| 1930 | 938 | | 17.8% |
| 1940 | 1,072 | | 14.3% |
| 1950 | 1,206 | | 12.5% |
| 1960 | 1,898 | | 57.4% |
| 1970 | 2,499 | | 31.7% |
| 1980 | 2,969 | | 18.8% |
| 1990 | 3,125 | | 5.3% |
| 2000 | 6,812 | | 118.0% |
| 2010 | 14,090 | | 106.8% |
| 2020 | 17,138 | | 21.6% |
U.S. Decennial Census

=== 2020 census ===
As of the 2020 census, Hernando had a population of 17,138. The median age was 37.6 years. 26.1% of residents were under the age of 18 and 15.4% of residents were 65 years of age or older. For every 100 females there were 94.2 males, and for every 100 females age 18 and over there were 90.4 males age 18 and over.

87.3% of residents lived in urban areas, while 12.7% lived in rural areas.

There were 6,176 households in Hernando, and 4,237 families. Of those households, 39.9% had children under the age of 18 living in them. Of all households, 56.7% were married-couple households, 11.9% were households with a male householder and no spouse or partner present, and 26.9% were households with a female householder and no spouse or partner present. About 23.0% of all households were made up of individuals and 12.0% had someone living alone who was 65 years of age or older.

There were 6,562 housing units, of which 5.9% were vacant. The homeowner vacancy rate was 0.8% and the rental vacancy rate was 17.6%.

Hernando Racial Composition
| Race | Num. | Perc. |
|---|---|---|
| White | 13,193 | 76.98% |
| Black or African American | 2,029 | 11.84% |
| Native American | 22 | 0.13% |
| Asian | 223 | 1.3% |
| Pacific Islander | 9 | 0.05% |
| Other/Mixed | 641 | 3.74% |
| Hispanic or Latino | 1,021 | 5.96% |

=== 2000 census ===
As of the census of 2000, there were 6,812 people, 2,482 households, and 1,809 families residing in the city. The population density was 603.0 inhabitants per square mile (232.8/km^{2}). There were 2,720 housing units at an average density of 240.8 per square mile (93.0/km^{2}). The racial makeup of the city was 76.35% White, 21.48% African American, 0.15% Native American, 0.66% Asian, 0.78% from other races, and 0.59% from two or more races. Hispanic or Latino of any race were 3.04% of the population.

There were 2,482 households, out of which 35.5% had children under the age of 18 living with them, 55.2% were married couples living together, 13.4% had a female householder with no husband present, and 27.1% were non-families. 22.9% of all households were made up of individuals, and 8.5% had someone living alone who was 65 years of age or older. The average household size was 2.60 and the average family size was 3.05.

In the city, the population was spread out, with 25.9% under the age of 18, 9.4% from 18 to 24, 30.9% from 25 to 44, 22.0% from 45 to 64, and 11.7% who were 65 years of age or older. The median age was 34 years. For every 100 females, there were 98.8 males. For every 100 females age 18 and over, there were 97.5 males.

The median income for a household in the city was $43,217, and the median income for a family was $51,155. Males had a median income of $39,706 versus $25,685 for females. The per capita income for the city was $20,731. About 6.5% of families and 9.8% of the population were below the poverty line, including 12.2% of those under age 18 and 16.3% of those age 65 or over.

== Education ==
Hernando is home to 5 public schools and is served by the DeSoto County School District.

== Gallery ==
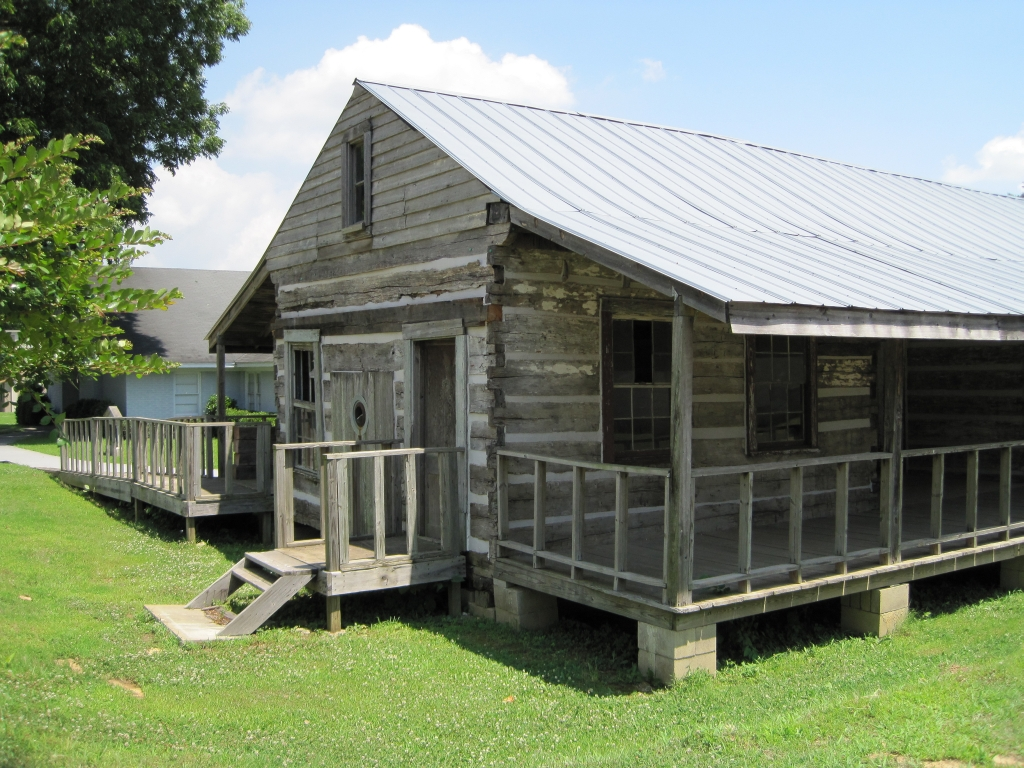
French colonial log house

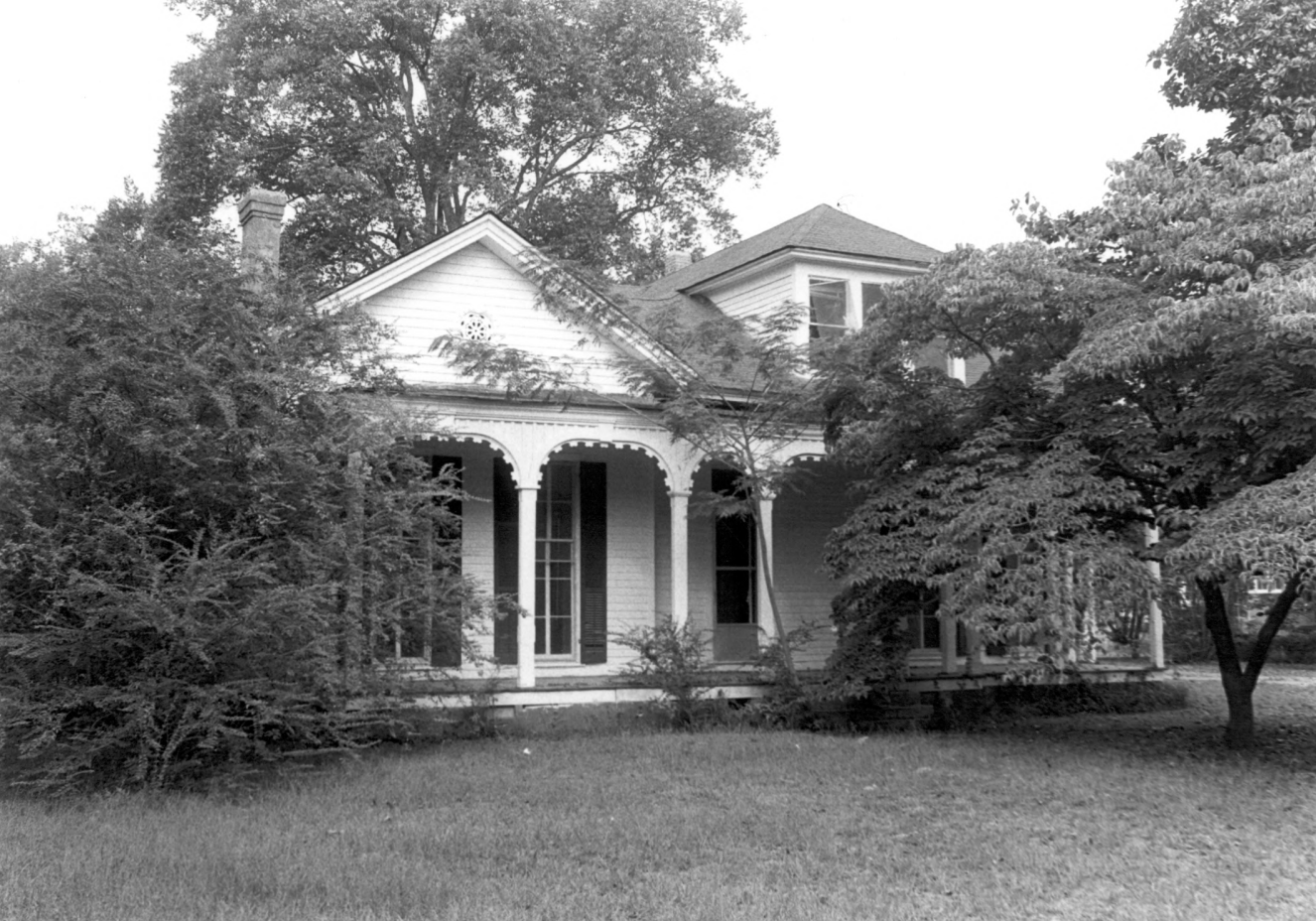
Felix LaBauve House, NRHP-listed

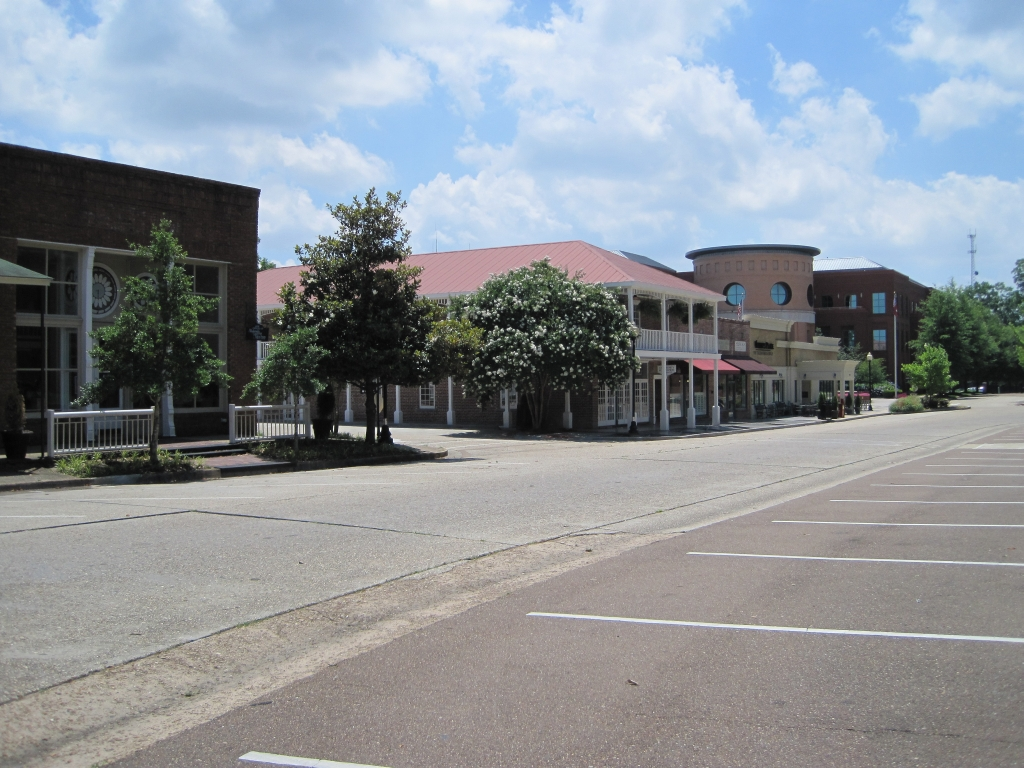
Court Square

== Media ==
- DeSoto Times-Tribune

== Notable people ==
- Garfield Akers, blues musician
- DeAundre Alford, cornerback for the Atlanta Falcons
- George "Mojo" Buford, blues musician
- Louis Bullard, former professional football player
- Paul Burlison, musician and member of The Rock and Roll Trio
- Melissa Cookston, chef and seven-time World Barbecue Champion
- Kevin Dockery, former professional football player
- Nathan Bedford Forrest, Confederate general in Civil War
- Marshall Grant, former bass player for Johnny Cash
- Jim Jackson, blues musician
- Felix LaBauve (1809–1879), French-born American early settler and community leader
- James Oliver, first African-American to graduate from UMMC
- Gary Parrish, sports columnist, reporter for the CBS Sports Network
- Austin Riley, Atlanta Braves third baseman
- Ricky Robertson, track and field high jumper, 2016 Olympian
- Deljuan Robinson, former professional football player
- Dan Sane, blues musician
- Bradley Sowell, former professional football player
- Garrison Starr, singer/songwriter
- Frank Stokes, blues musician
- Robert Wilkins, blues musician
