= Aaron Shirley =

- Born: January 3, 1933; Gluckstadt, Mississippi, U.S.
- Died: November 26, 2014 (aged 81); Jackson, Mississippi, U.S.
- Education: Tougaloo College; Meharry Medical College
- Occupations: Physician; pediatrician; civil rights activist
- Spouse: Ollye Shirley
- Children: 4

Aaron Shirley (January 3, 1933 – November 26, 2014) was an American physician, health care innovator, and civil rights activist.

Shirley was born in Gluckstadt, Mississippi. His first introduction to becoming a medical professional was through his sister who was a nurse who firmly planted the expectation that he should become a physician and contribute to the community. He was chairman of the board for the Jackson Medical Mall Foundation, and an associate professor in pediatrics at the University of Mississippi Medical Center.

== Education ==
He was a graduate of Tougaloo College, receiving a Bachelor of Science in 1955, and graduated from Meharry Medical College with an M.D. in 1959. Dr. Shirley completed medical school and his internship in Tennessee, then entered private practice in Vicksburg in 1960. He completed his education in traditionally Black colleges and did not have access to hospital privileges. Dr. Blair E. Batson, chair of the Department of Pediatrics at University of Mississippi Medical Center, offered him a position in the department's residency education program. Shirley became the first African-American learner at UMMC when he entered the residency program in 1965. For a long time, Shirley was the only black pediatrician in the state of Mississippi.

== Career ==
Shirley co-formed the Medical Committee on Human Rights in 1963 to provide medical care to civil rights workers during Mississippi's Freedom Summer. He was a member of the Institute of Medicine, and Citizens' Health Care Working Group.

In 1970, Shirley co-founded Jackson-Hinds Comprehensive Health Center, the largest Federal Qualified Community Health Center and only the second Community Health Center within the state of Mississippi to provide medical care for the underserved. The center later became a model for federally funded medical centers across the country for health promotion, disease prevention, and comprehensive care. The center also served as a hub to recruit African-Americans into becoming health professionals. The center additionally serves as a central base for family-planning services that is part of an exceptional, school-based health program.

In 1996, Dr. Shirley created the Jackson Medical Mall, from an abandoned shopping center, in collaboration with Jackson State University, Tougaloo College, and the University of Mississippi. Shirley was led the Jackson Medical Mall Foundation as chair until his death in 2014.

In 2010, Shirley founded the HealthConnect program. Modeled after a similar program in Iran, the program sends doctors and nurses to poor rural homes to help prevent unnecessary ER visits. This type of "health house" program allows for health care professionals to provide preventative care in rural environments. At its launch in 2010, the HealthConnect program consisted of 11 school-based community health centers across Mississippi.

== Personal life ==
He was married to Dr. Ollye Brown Shirley, who he met during his time at Tougaloo College. The couple had four children. Dr. Ollye Shirley was an educator and civil rights activist who served on the Jackson Public Schools board of directors and as chair of the Mississippi NAACP Education Committee. The Shirleys' Vicksburg home was a gathering place for the Black civil rights movement in the 1960s. The Shirleys additionally operated a Black weekly newsletter that made its way to the all-white Democratic National Convention in 1964.

== Death and legacy ==
Shirley died of natural causes in Jackson, Mississippi, on November 26, 2014. He was 81. Gov. Phil Bryant declared December 6, 2014 as “Dr. Aaron Shirley Day” in the state. Also, Jackson City Councilman Melvin Priester Jr. presented Shirley's family with an American flag that flew over the White House the previous week in Shirley's honor. It was sent by President Barack Obama and 2nd District U.S. Rep. Bennie Thompson.

In 2020, Robert E. Lee Elementary School in Jackson, Mississippi, was renamed Shirley Elementary School after Drs. Aaron Shirley and Ollye Shirley.

== Awards ==
- 2015 Community Service Award from the Mississippi board of Trustees of the State Institutions of Higher Learning (Post-Humous)
- 2013 American Association of Clinical Endocrinology. AACE Outstanding Service Award for Promotion of Endocrine Health of an Underserved Population.
- 2013 Citizen Diplomat Award
- 2009 Governor's Initiative for Volunteer Excellence (GIVE) Award
- 2007 Mississippi Majesty Honoree
- 1993 MacArthur Fellows Program "Genius Grant"
