= University of Mississippi School of Medicine =

Public medical school in Oxford, Mississippi, US

- Type: Medical school
- Established: 1903
- Affiliations: University of Mississippi
- Students: 413
- Location: Jackson, Mississippi, USA; 32.33077°N 90.170313°W
- Campus: University of Mississippi Medical Center
- Colors: Blue and White
- Nickname: UMSOM
- Website: https://www.umc.edu/som

The University of Mississippi School of Medicine (UMSOM) is the medical school of the University of Mississippi in the U.S. state of Mississippi.

The UMSOM was created in 1903 on the Oxford campus. In 1955, it was moved from the Oxford campus to the state capital of Jackson and was expanded to include the third and fourth years of training. The University of Mississippi Medical Center, the health sciences campus of the University of Mississippi, houses the School of Medicine.

As of 2006, there were 413 students enrolled in UMSOM. This includes students enrolled in the four-year M.D. program as well as students enrolled in the seven-year M.D./Ph.D program.
