= University of Mississippi Medical Center =

Geography
- Location: 2500 N. State St., Jackson, Mississippi, United States
- Coordinates: 32.328853°N 90.173159°W

Organization
- Type: Public; Academic Medical Center

Services
- Emergency department: Level I
- Beds: 722

Helipads
- Helipad: FAA designator: 4MS6

History
- Founded: 1955

Links
- Website: www.umc.edu
- Lists: Hospitals in Mississippi

University of Mississippi Medical Center (UMMC) is the health sciences campus of the University of Mississippi (Ole Miss) and is located in Jackson, Mississippi, United States. UMMC, also referred to as the Medical Center, is the state's only academic medical center.

UMMC houses seven health science schools: Medicine, Dentistry, Nursing, Health Related Professions, Graduate Studies in the Health Sciences, Population Health and Pharmacy. (The main School of Pharmacy is headquartered on the University of Mississippi (UM) campus in Oxford, Mississippi.) The 164-acre campus also includes University Hospital, Wiser Hospital for Women and Infants, Conerly Critical Care Hospital, Children's of Mississippi (including the Blair E. Batson Tower and the Kathy and Joe Sanderson Tower), the state's only children's hospital, and Rowland Medical Library.

== History ==
The University of Mississippi Medical Center opened in 1955, but its beginnings date to 1903 when a two-year medical school was established on the parent campus in Oxford. In that era, certificate graduates went out of state to complete their doctor of medicine degrees.

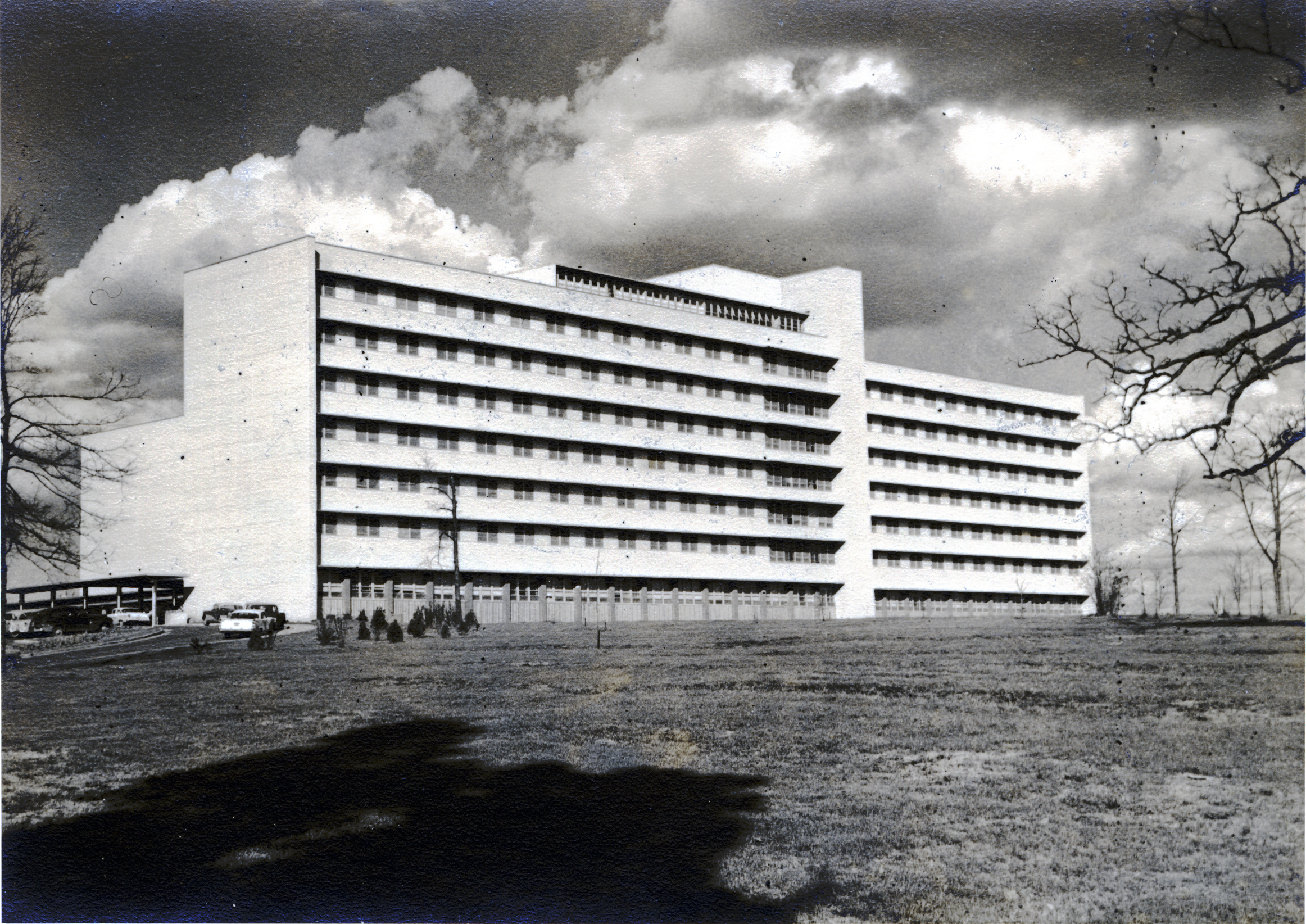
University Medical Center, circa 1950

Finally, in 1950, the Mississippi Legislature enacted a law to create a four-year medical school associated with the University of Mississippi. On July 1, 1955, the state's new Medical Center, then commonly referred to as UMC, opened in Jackson, initially as a four-year medical school with medical and graduate students, interns and residents. As it had in Oxford, the School of Medicine offered both medical and graduate degree programs. The campus included a teaching hospital and a library.

The Oxford campus' nursing department moved to the Medical Center in 1956 and was granted school status in 1958. The School of Health Related Professions (SHRP) was added in 1971 and began offering baccalaureate curricula in 1973. The School of Dentistry was authorized in 1973, and its first students were admitted in 1975. The graduate program was elevated to school status in 2001 and designated the School of Graduate Studies in the Health Sciences.

The parcel of land on which UMMC's University Hospital sits was once the site of the Mississippi Insane Asylum, which moved its operations in 1935 to Whitfield, Miss., and became Mississippi State Hospital. The bodies of perhaps seven thousand patients have been found on campus in unmarked graves.

=== Civil rights era ===
At its opening in 1955, UMMC provided care to African-American patients, but the patient-care facilities were segregated by race, according to local laws in the South at the time. In 1963, civil rights leader Medgar Evers was rushed to UMMC after being shot at his home in Jackson, MS, but he died in the hospital emergency room. In 1964, UMMC became the primary medical provider for injured Freedom Riders.

Title VI of the Civil Rights Act of 1964 prohibited federally funded institutions from discriminating. In 1965, the NAACP Legal Defense and Educational Fund filed a federal civil rights complaint against UMMC. Robert Q. Marston, MD, then medical dean and Medical Center director, developed a compliance strategy which included hiring the first black faculty member, and integrating the hospitals and clinics.

At about the same time, Dr. Blair E. Batson, chair of the Department of Pediatrics at UMMC, offered a position in the department's residency education program to Dr. Aaron Shirley, an African-American physician who had attended medical school in Tennessee. Shirley became the first African-American learner at UMMC when he entered the residency program in 1965.

In 1966, Sammie Long became the first Black woman to attend the school. In 1972, James Oliver became the school's first Black M.D.-degree recipient.

=== Modern era ===
In June 2023, the UMMC shut down its LGBT health clinic in response to legislative pressure.

In July 2026, the UMMC became the first MD-PhD program in Mississippi to receive its Medical Scientist Training Program (MSTP) designation, placing UMMC among a select group of institutions recognized by the National Institute of General Medical Sciences (NIGMS) for excellence in physician-scientist training.

== About ==
As the academic health sciences campus of the University of Mississippi, the Medical Center functions as a separately accredited, semi-autonomous unit responsible to the chancellor of the university and through him to the constitutional Board of Trustees of the State Institutions of Higher Learning (IHL). The University of Mississippi Medical Center is accredited by the Southern Association of Colleges and Schools Commission on Colleges (SACSCOC) to award baccalaureate, master's and doctorate degrees. The Medical Center is accredited by The Joint Commission.

The IHL Board of Trustees appoints the UM chancellor, who then recommends a candidate for UMMC's vice chancellor for health affairs. The vice chancellor also serves as the dean of the University of Mississippi School of Medicine. LouAnn Woodward, MD, was named March 1, 2015, to fill the vice chancellor position. She is responsible for the overall strategic direction of the Medical Center. She is the first woman and the 10th person to hold the post.

Enrollment in UMMC's 35 degree programs is more than 3,000 students. Admission preference is given to Mississippi residents in an effort to supply professionals to meet the state's health-care needs.

The Associated Student Body (ASB) is the student government association for UMMC. It serves as a mechanism to organize student extracurricular activities and to voice student concerns, ideas, and questions to the administration and community.

UMMC is the only hospital in the state designated as a Level 1 trauma center. Specialized hospital services include: an interventional MRI; the only Level 4 neonatal intensive care unit (NICU) in the state; separate medical, surgical, cardiac, neuroscience and pediatric ICUs; a heart station for diagnosis and treatment of heart disease; a heart failure clinic; heart, kidney, liver, pancreas, cornea and bone marrow transplant programs; a comprehensive stroke unit; state-of-the-art radiological imaging systems; a sleep disorders laboratory; an in vitro fertilization program; and special pharmaceutical services.

A portion of land on the UMMC campus was once the site of the Mississippi Insane Asylum, which moved its operations in 1935 and became Mississippi State Hospital.

=== Medical facilities ===
UMMC has the only hospital in the state designated as a Level 1 trauma center, and the state's only Level 4 neonatal intensive care unit (NICU) located in the Wiser Hospital for Women and Infants. The Medical Center also has the only organ transplant (adult and pediatric) program and OB/GYN emergency room in Mississippi.

With a total of 1,003 beds, including Holmes County and Grenada locations, UMMC is the largest diagnostic, treatment and referral care system in the state. Based on the latest fiscal year (2013–14) statistics, inpatient admissions at the multiple locations totaled more than 33,000, with more than 487,000 hospital outpatient visits. The UMMC emergency rooms in Jackson had 70,000 visits, while Grenada had 18,324 and Holmes County had 6,657.

Hospitals include:

- University Hospital
- Wallace Conerly Critical Care Hospital
- Winfred L. Wiser Hospital for Women and Infants
- Children's of Mississippi Hospital
- Blair E. Batson Hospital for Children
- UMMC Holmes County
- UMMC Grenada

University Physicians (UP), the faculty group practice of the School of Medicine is the state's largest medical group representing more than 125 specialties. This network of providers includes more than 1,000 health care specialists and subspecialists. UP providers see about 404,870 patients each year in 170 locations in 38 counties.

UMMC faculty and advanced practice providers see patients at several on- and off-site clinics.

Specialized clinics include:

- UP Pavilion – Jackson, Miss.
- UP Grants Ferry – Flowood, Miss.
- UP Lakeland Medicine Center – Jackson, Miss
- UP Northeast Jackson at Select Specialty Hospital – Jackson, Miss.
- Women's Specialty Care at Mirror Lake – Flowood, Miss.
- The Face & Skin Center of University Physicians – Ridgeland, Miss.
- UMMC Cancer Institute at Jackson Medical Mall – Jackson, Miss.
- UP Clinics at Jackson Medical Mall – Jackson, Miss.

Other features and facilities include separate medical, surgical, cardiac, neuroscience and pediatric ICUs; University Heart for the diagnosis and treatment of heart disease; a heart failure clinic; a comprehensive stroke center; epilepsy center, state-of-the-art radiological imaging systems; a sleep disorders laboratory; an in vitro fertilization program; and special pharmaceutical services.

In 2007, professional football standout Eli Manning undertook a five-year campaign to improve UMMC's pediatric clinics. More than $2.9 million was raised, and the clinics were renamed Eli Manning Children's Clinics. In 2014, father Archie Manning and his family joined with UMMC to launch the Manning Family Fund for a Healthier Mississippi. The donor-supported program boosts the Medical Center's commitment to improving Mississippians' health. The partnership between the Mannings and UMMC raises money to attack heart disease, kidney disease, diabetes, cancer, dementia and other health challenges confronting Mississippians.

UMMC outreach programs help fulfill the Medical Center's mission of improving the overall health of Mississippians. Efforts range from volunteer and pastoral services at UMMC to statewide emergency medical responses and state-sponsored outreach initiatives.

=== Centers and institutes ===
UMMC is the home for a variety of specialized health-care, research and education centers and institutes, including:

- Cancer Center and Research Institute
- Myrlie Evers-Williams Institute for the Elimination of Health Disparities
- UMMC Neuro Institute
- ACT Center for Tobacco Treatment, Education and Research
- Cardiovascular-Renal Research Center
- Center for Bioethics and Medical Humanities
- Center for Developmental Disorders Research
- Center for Psychiatric Neuroscience
- Center for Sialendoscopy and Salivary Gland Disorders
- Center for Telehealth
- Center of Biostatistics and Bioinformatics
- Children's Cancer Center
- Children's Safe Center
- Comprehensive Epilepsy Center
- Comprehensive Stroke Center
- Memory Impairment and Neurodegenerative Dementia Center
- Mississippi Center for Obesity Research
- Women's Health Research Center
- Clinical Skills Assessment Center
- Simulation and Interprofessional Education Center

=== Center for Telehealth ===
In 2003, UMMC helped start a pilot program to connect emergency physicians in Jackson with three rural hospitals using telecommunications. The program has now grown into the Center for Telehealth, which ranks among the top programs in the nation.

Telehealth, also known as telemedicine, uses remote technologies to provide services ranging from diabetes counseling to remote monitoring of intensive care patients. UMMC's telehealth program functions as a virtual clinic performing direct medical diagnostics and treatment from physicians, specialists and nurses. It averages 8,000 consultations a month.

In 2015, UMMC and data company Venyu Solutions (acquired by EATEL in 2013) partnered to expand the Medical Center's telehealth services.

The 40,000 square foot UMMC Center for Telehealth Venyu Technology Campus is being constructed by Duvall Decker Architects, in Jackson, Mississippi, and is recognized by an AIA Mississippi Award Citation.

=== Affiliated entities ===
Separate entities are affiliated with UMMC because of services they provide in support of the Medical Center. They include:

- Children's Miracle Network
- UMMC Alliance
- University Transplant Guild

=== Aircare Flight Service ===
The University of Mississippi Medical Center's Helicopter Flight program began operations in 1996 with a single helicopter based in Jackson. The Jackson-based AirCare 1 helicopter was joined by the Meridian-based AirCare 2 helicopter in spring 2009, the Golden Triangle-based AirCare 3 in spring 2016, and Greenwood-based Aircare 4 in 2017. The additional helicopters allowed AirCare to expand its mission profile by transporting patients to not only UMMC, but other hospitals able to provide levels of care required by the patient's illness or injury. Scene response profile has also changed, allowing the transportation of multiple patients from a single location. Since the program's inception, AirCare teams have safely transported over 18,000 adults, pediatric and neonatal patients over 2 million miles as of 2016. On March 10, 2025, an AirCare helicopter crashed in Madison county after transporting a patient to the hospital. Two UMMC medical staff and the pilot were killed.

=== Economic impact ===
With more than 10,000 full- and part-time employees, UMMC is one of the largest employers in Mississippi. Its annual budget – approximately one-tenth from state appropriations – represents 10 percent of the Jackson metro area economy and 2 percent of the state economy.

On any given weekday, about 20,000 employees, students, patients, family members, vendors and other guests are present on the UMMC campus.

== Notable people ==
=== Alumni ===
- Jim C. Barnett, physician and surgeon from Brookhaven; member of the Mississippi House of Representatives from 1992 to 2008
- Blair E. Batson, first chairman of pediatrics at UMMC; namesake of the Blair E. Batson Hospital for Children
- Wallace Conerly, physician; UMMC vice chancellor from 1994 to 2003; namesake of the Wallace Conerly Critical Care Hospital
- John C. Fleming, family physician; former coroner; US Congressman from Louisiana 2009–2017; Assistant Secretary of the US Department of Commerce, White House Deputy Chief of staff.
- Hannah Gay, UMMC associate professor pediatrics; named to 2013 TIME 100, the magazine's annual list of the 100 most influential people in the world. Recognized for an atypical treatment regime that functionally cured a baby born with HIV in 2010.
- Arthur Guyton, physiologist; former UMMC dean; author of Textbook of Medical Physiology, the world's best-selling physiology book.
- James D. Hardy, surgeon; performed the first human lung transplant in 1963 and first animal-to-human heart transplant in 1964. The heart of a chimpanzee was used for the heart transplant because of Dr. Hardy's research on transplantation, consisting of primate studies during the previous nine years.
- Daniel Jones, physician, former Ole Miss chancellor and 2007–08 national president of the American Heart Association
- Robert Q. Marston, former UMMC dean; research scientist and medical professor
- Aaron Shirley from Gluckstadt, Miss.; physician, UMMC associate professor and civil right activist.
- Winfred L. Wiser, physician; chairman of the UMMC Department of Obstetrics and Gynecology from 1976 to 1996; namesake of the Winfred Wiser Hospital for Women and Infants; namesake of the Winfred L. Wiser Society and the Winfred L. Wiser Chair of Gynecologic Surgery

=== Leadership ===
- Dr. David S. Pankratz, 1955–61; dean, School of Medicine and Medical Center director
- Dr. Robert Q. Marston, 1961–66; dean, School of Medicine, Medical Center director and vice chancellor for health affairs
- Dr. John Gronvall, 1966–1967; acting dean, School of Medicine and acting Medical Center director
- Dr. Robert Carter, 1967–70; dean, School of Medicine and Medical Center director
- Dr. Robert E. Blount, 1970–73; dean, School of Medicine and Medical Center director
- Dr. Norman C. Nelson, 1973–94; dean, School of Medicine and vice chancellor for health affairs
- Dr. Wallace Conerly, 1994–2003; dean, School of Medicine and vice chancellor for health affairs
- Dr. Daniel W. Jones, 2003–10; dean, School of Medicine and vice chancellor for health affairs
- Dr. James E. Keeton, 2010–15; dean, School of Medicine and vice chancellor for health affairs
- Dr. LouAnn Woodward, 2015–present; dean, School of Medicine and vice chancellor for health affairs
