= List of blues musicians =

Blues musicians are musical artists who are primarily recognized as writing, performing, and recording blues music. They come from different eras and include styles such as ragtime-vaudeville, Delta and country blues, and urban styles from Chicago and the West Coast. In the last several decades, blues music has developed a less regional character and has been influenced by rhythm and blues, rock, and other popular music.

== Pre-1940 blues ==
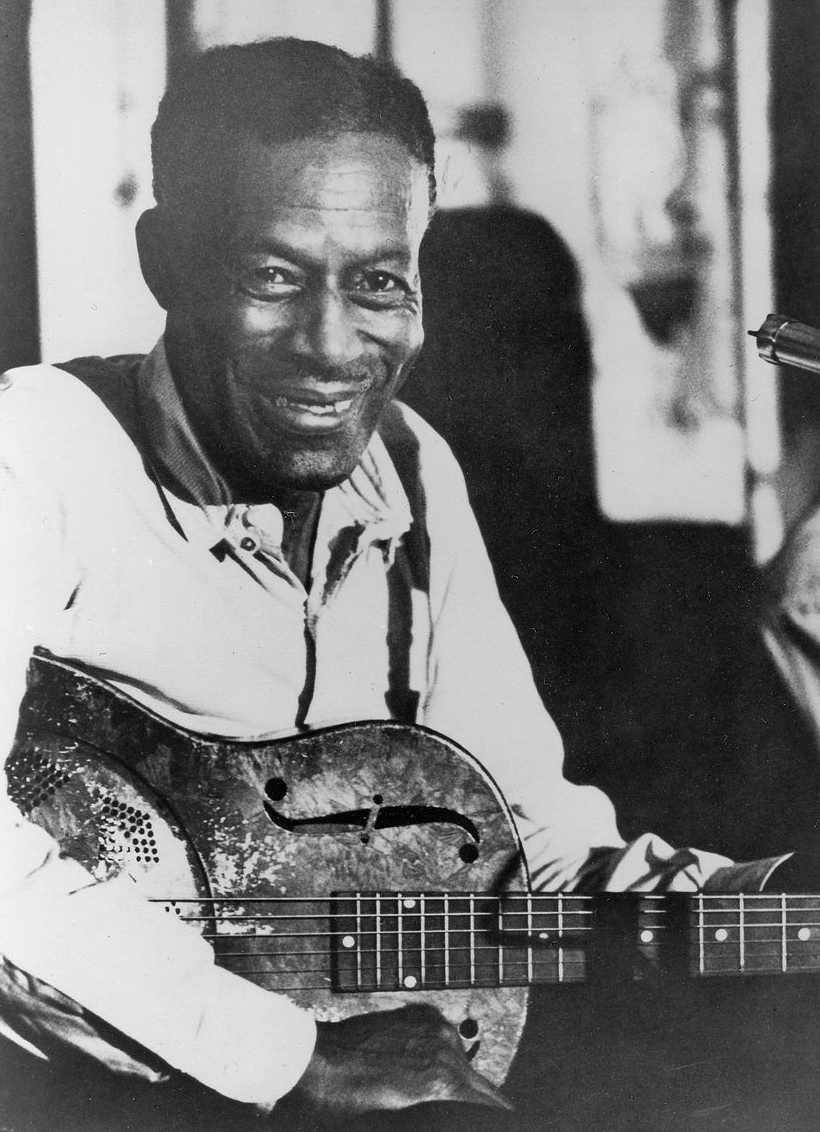
Son House

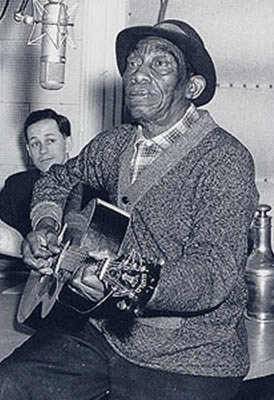
Mississippi John Hurt, 1964

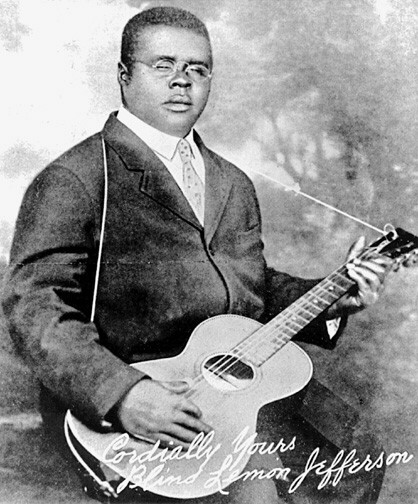
Blind Lemon Jefferson

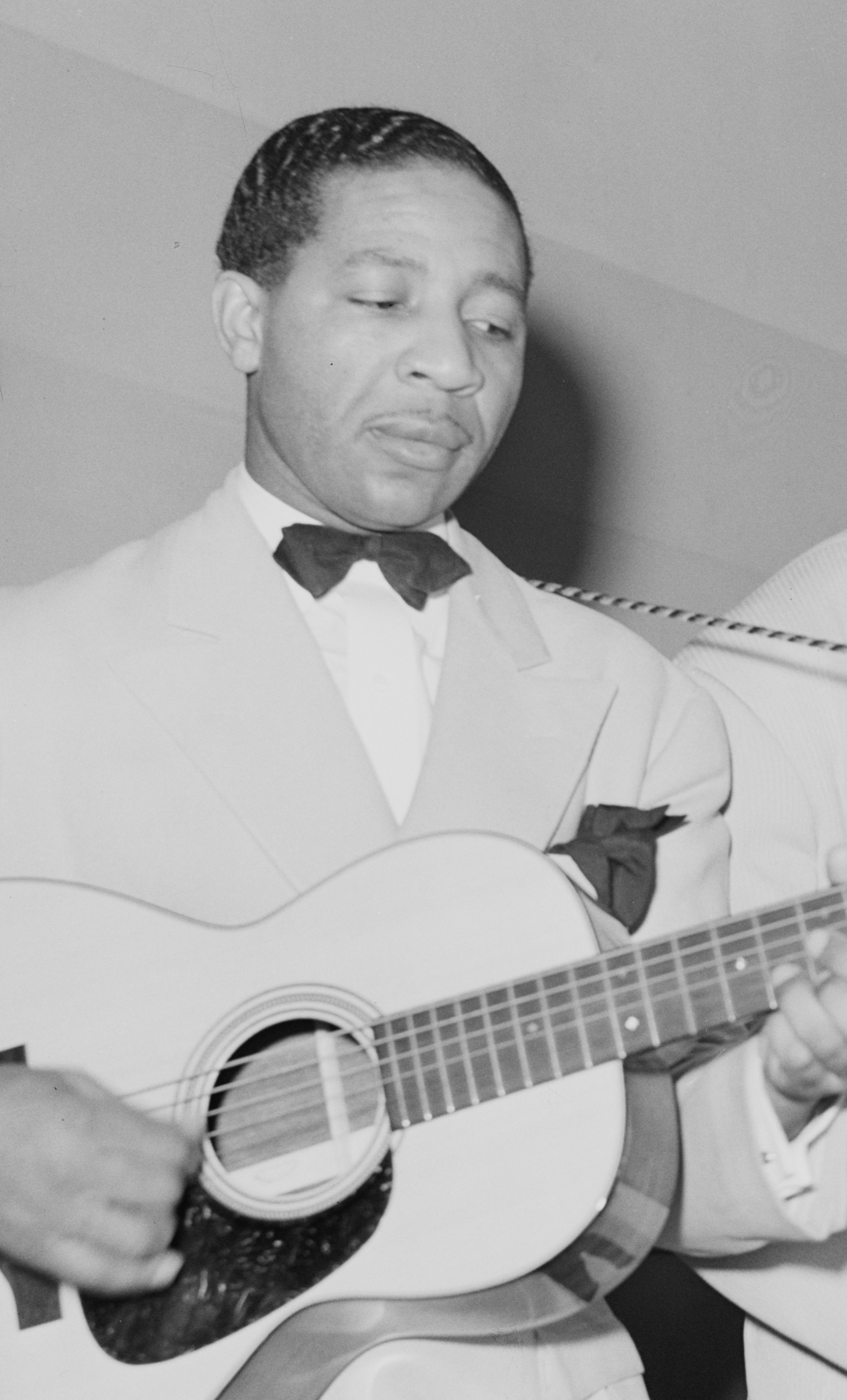
Lonnie Johnson, 1941

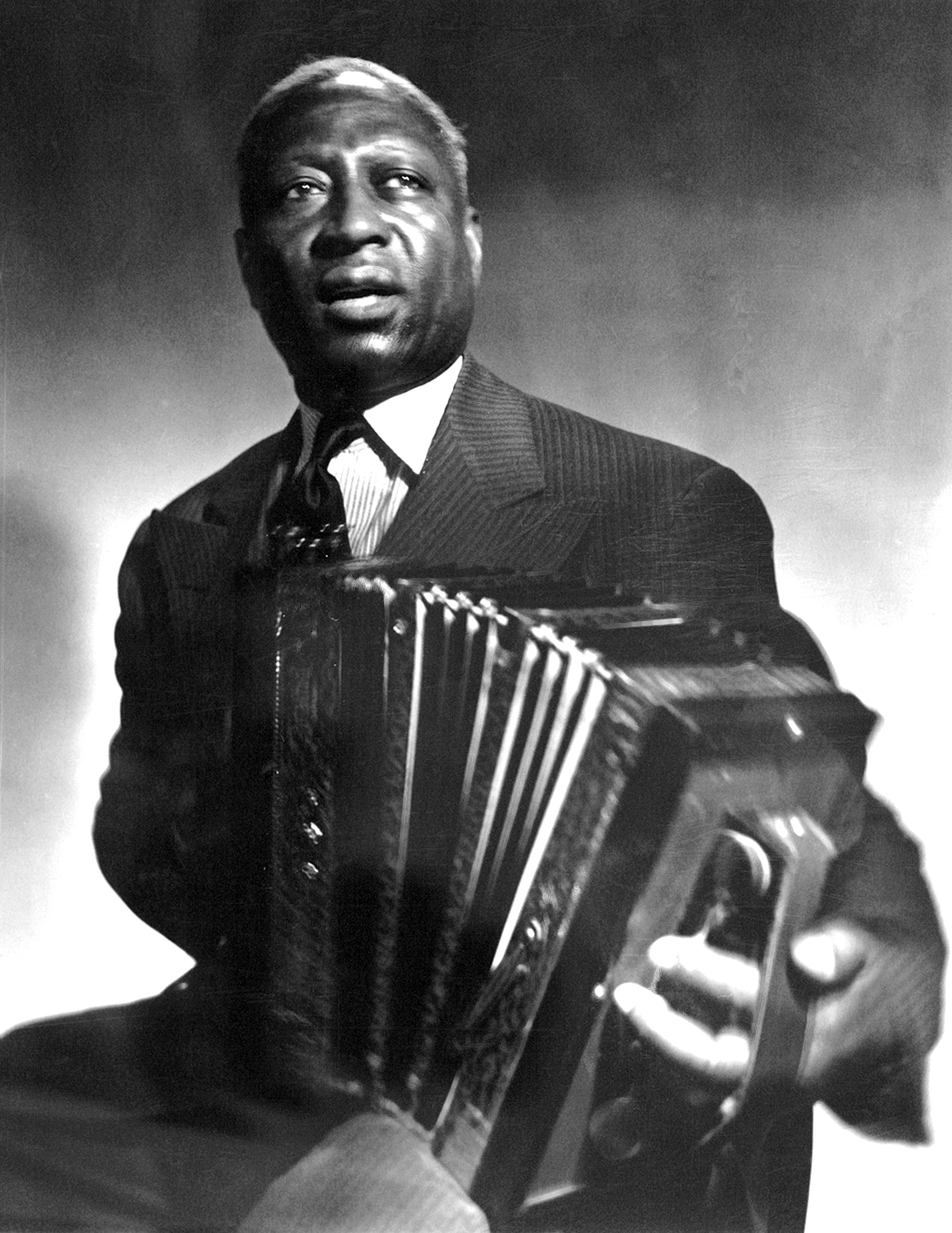
Lead Belly

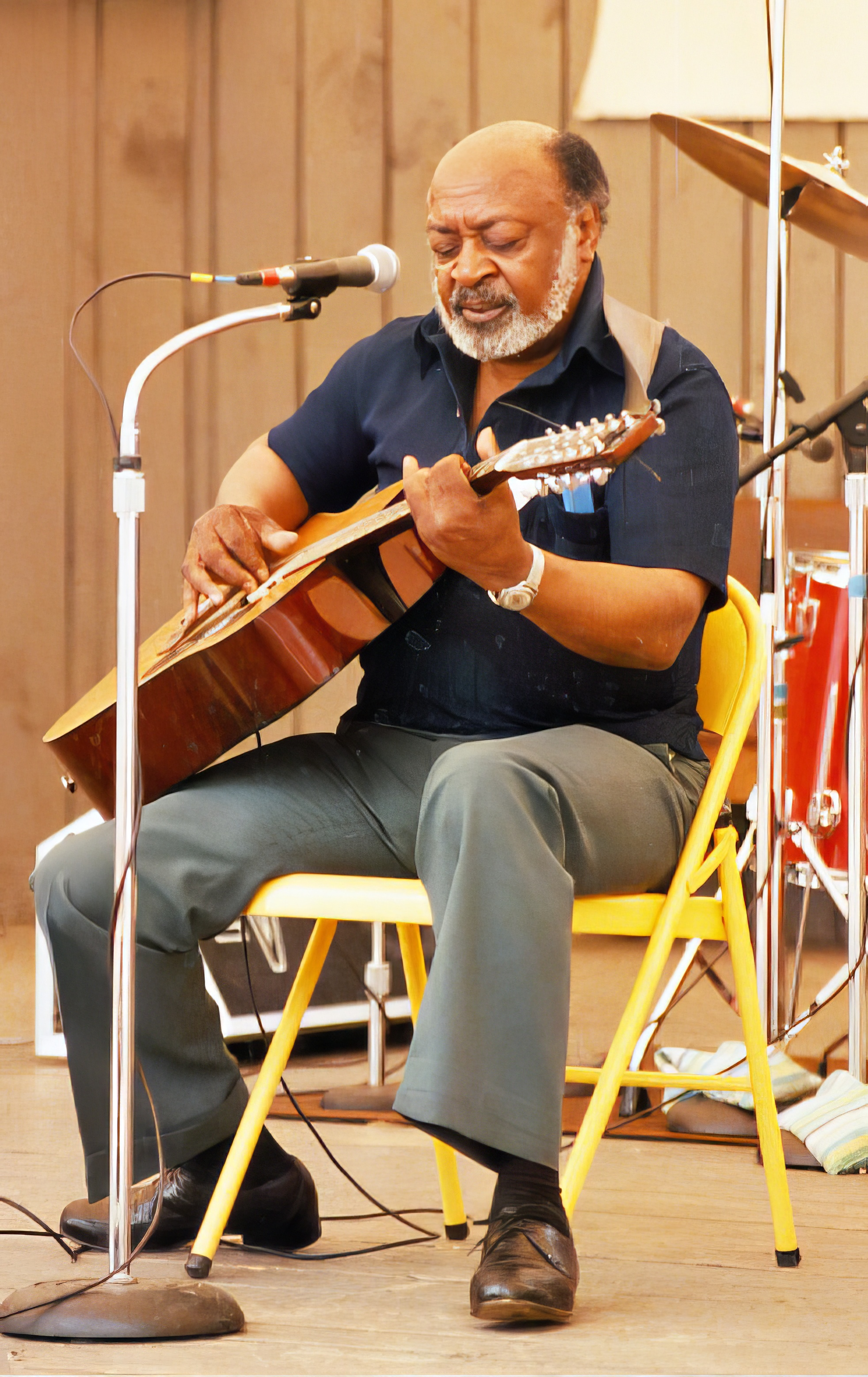
Robert Jr. Lockwood, 1982

Sara Martin and Sylvester Weaver

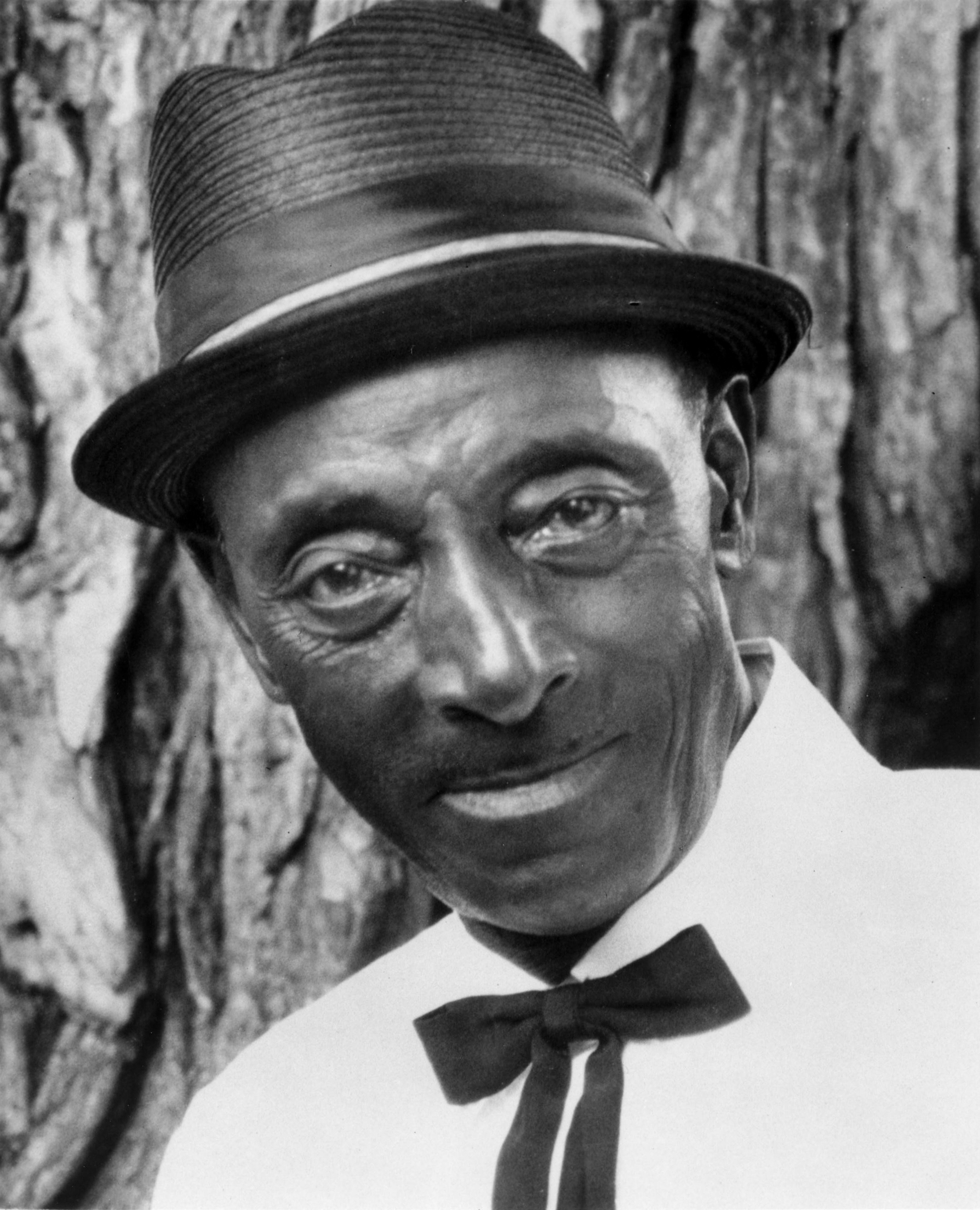
Mississippi Fred McDowell, 1972

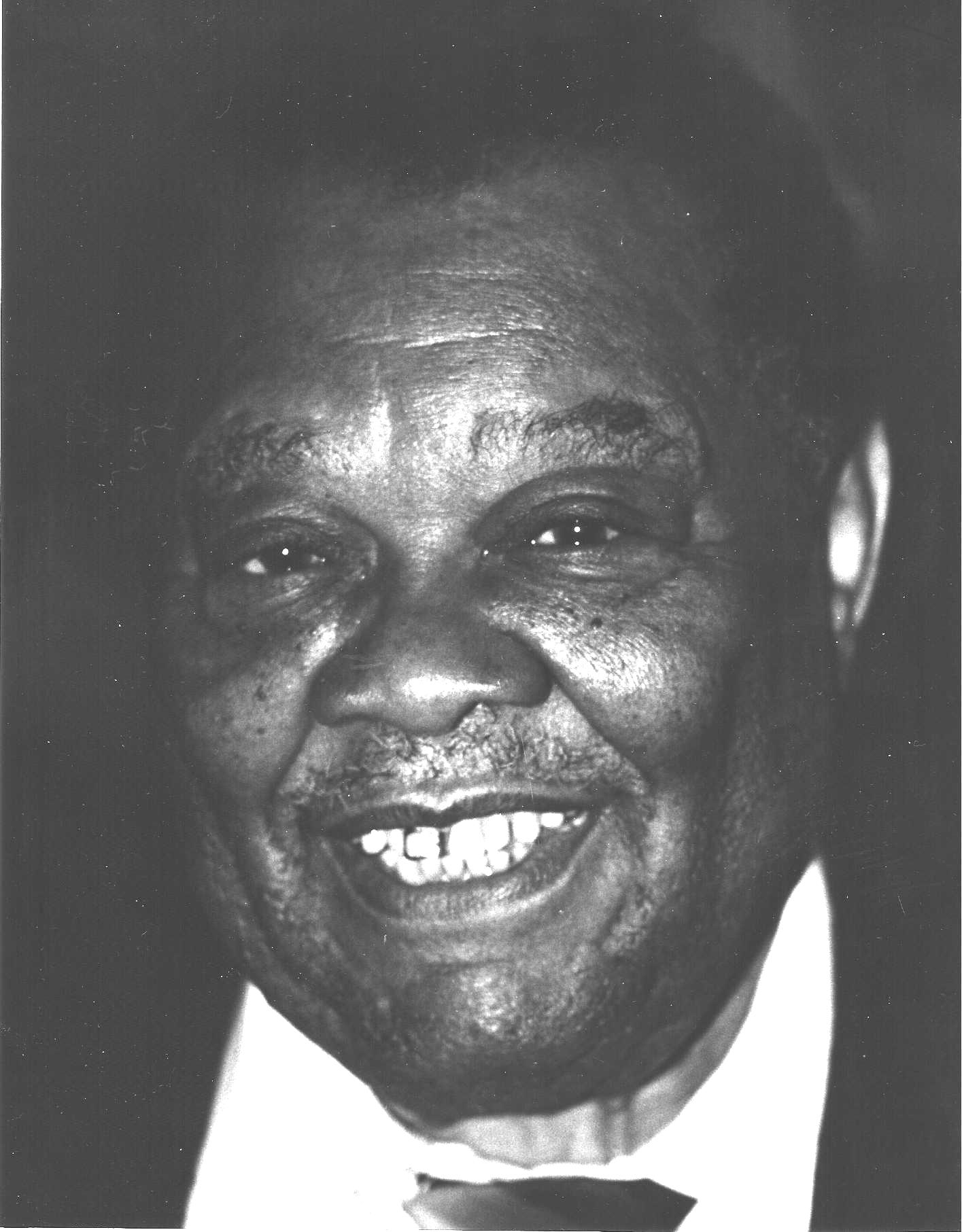
Jay McShann in Edinburgh, c.1995

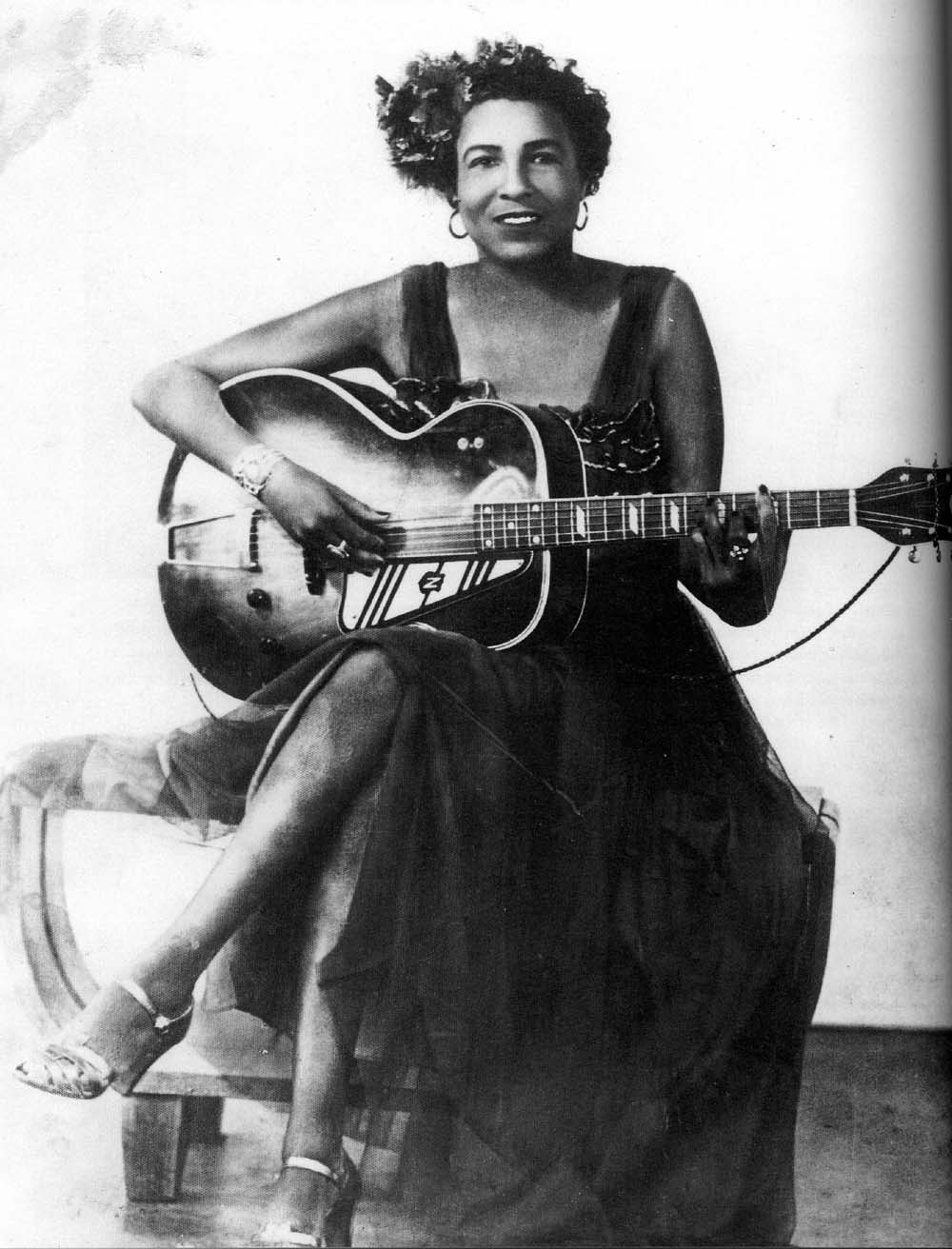
Memphis Minnie, 1930

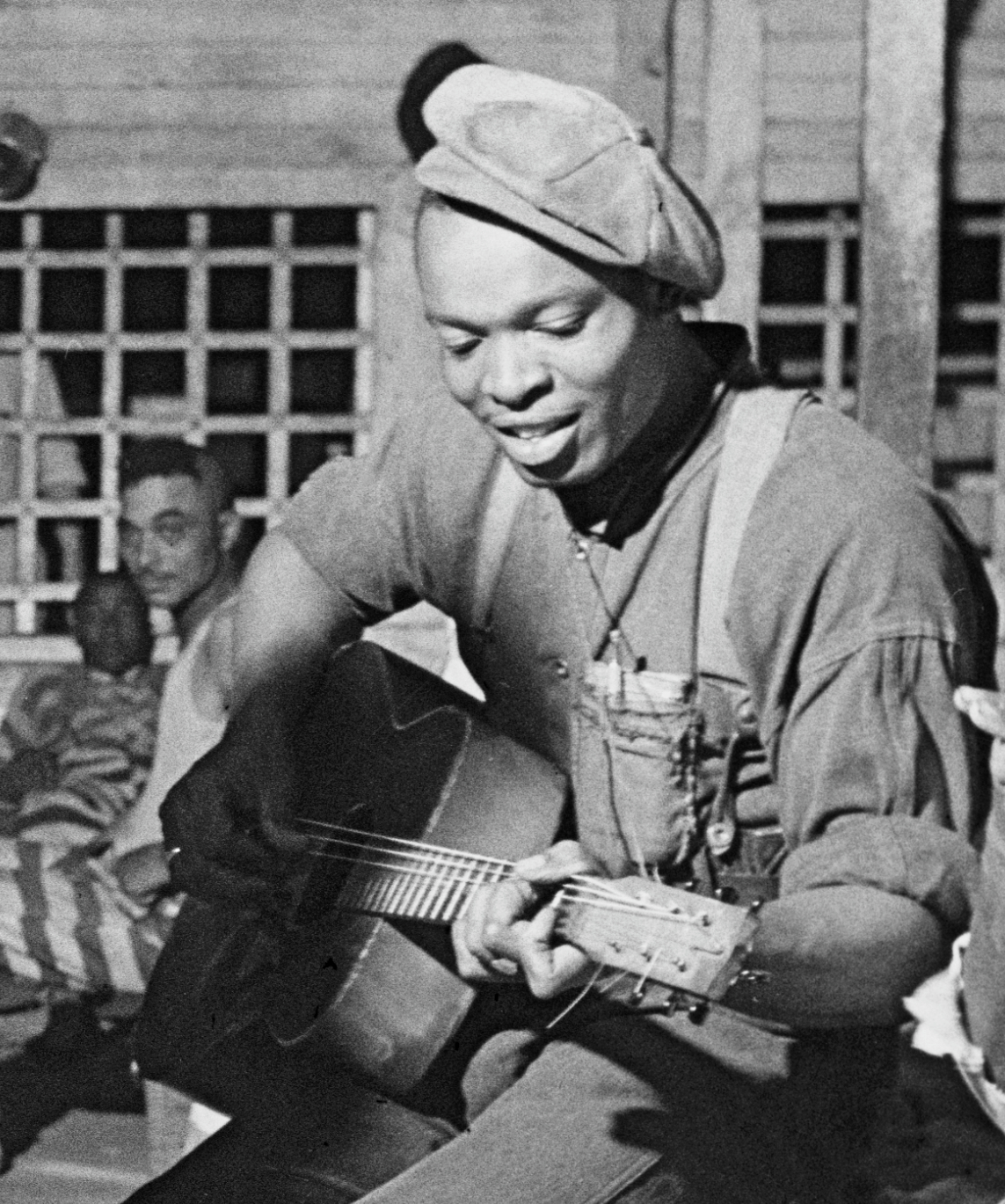
Buddy Moss in Georgia prison camp, 1941

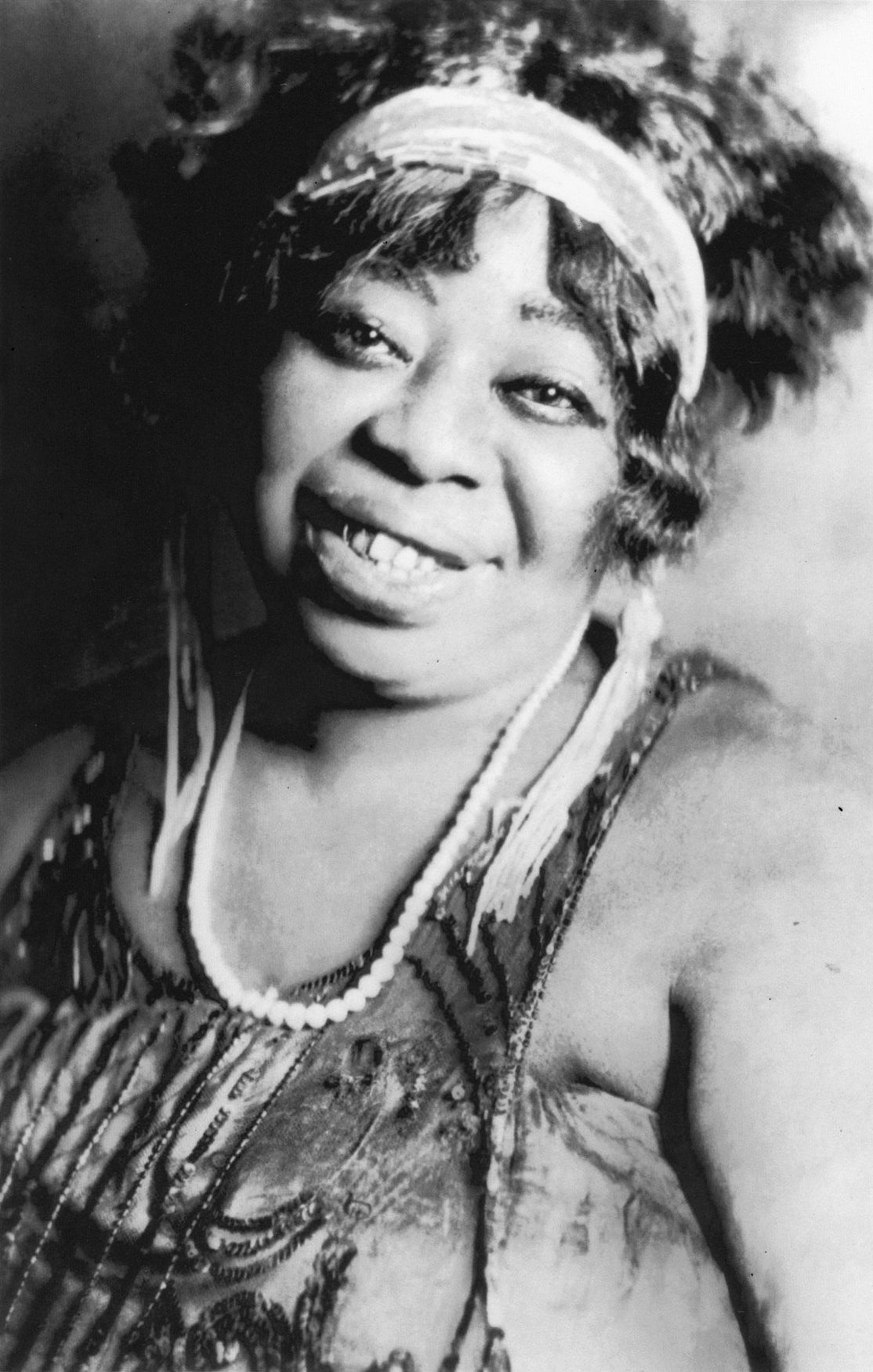
Ma Rainey

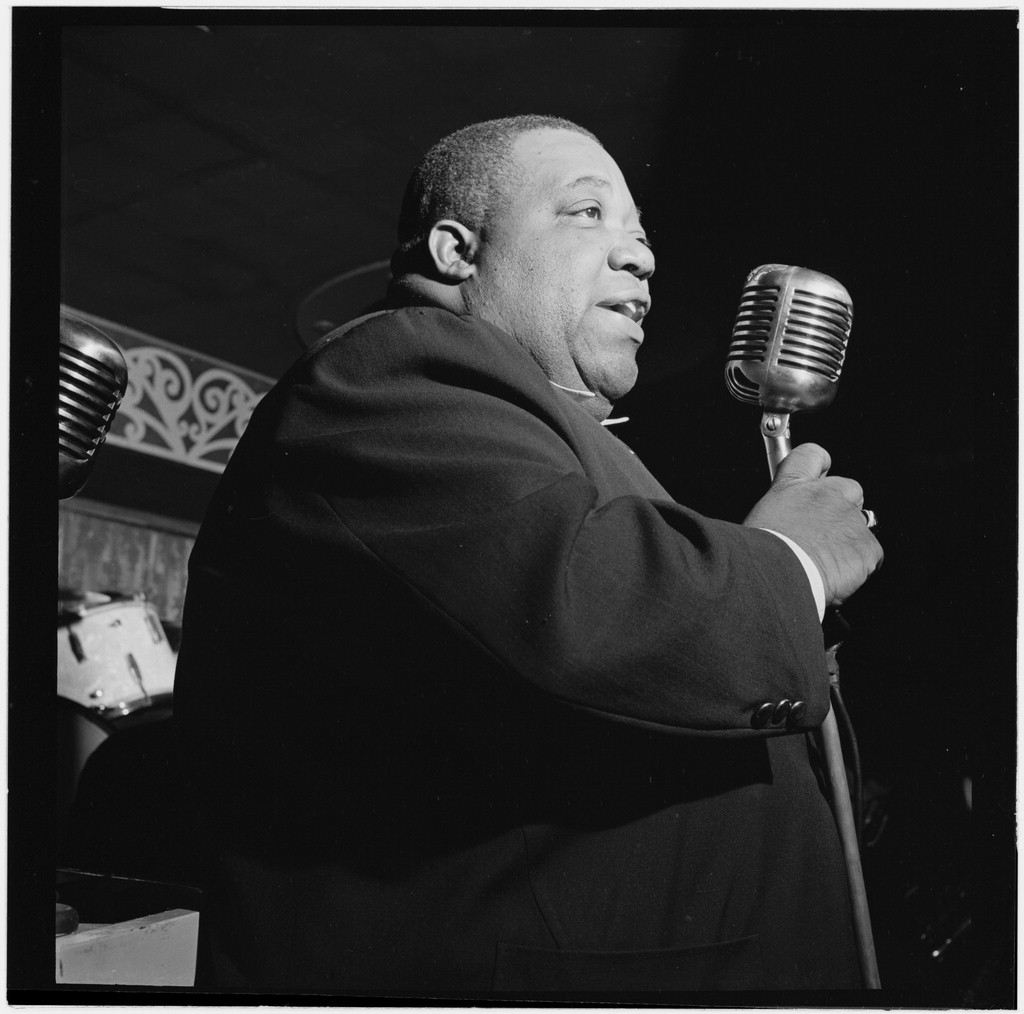
Jimmy Rushing, 1946

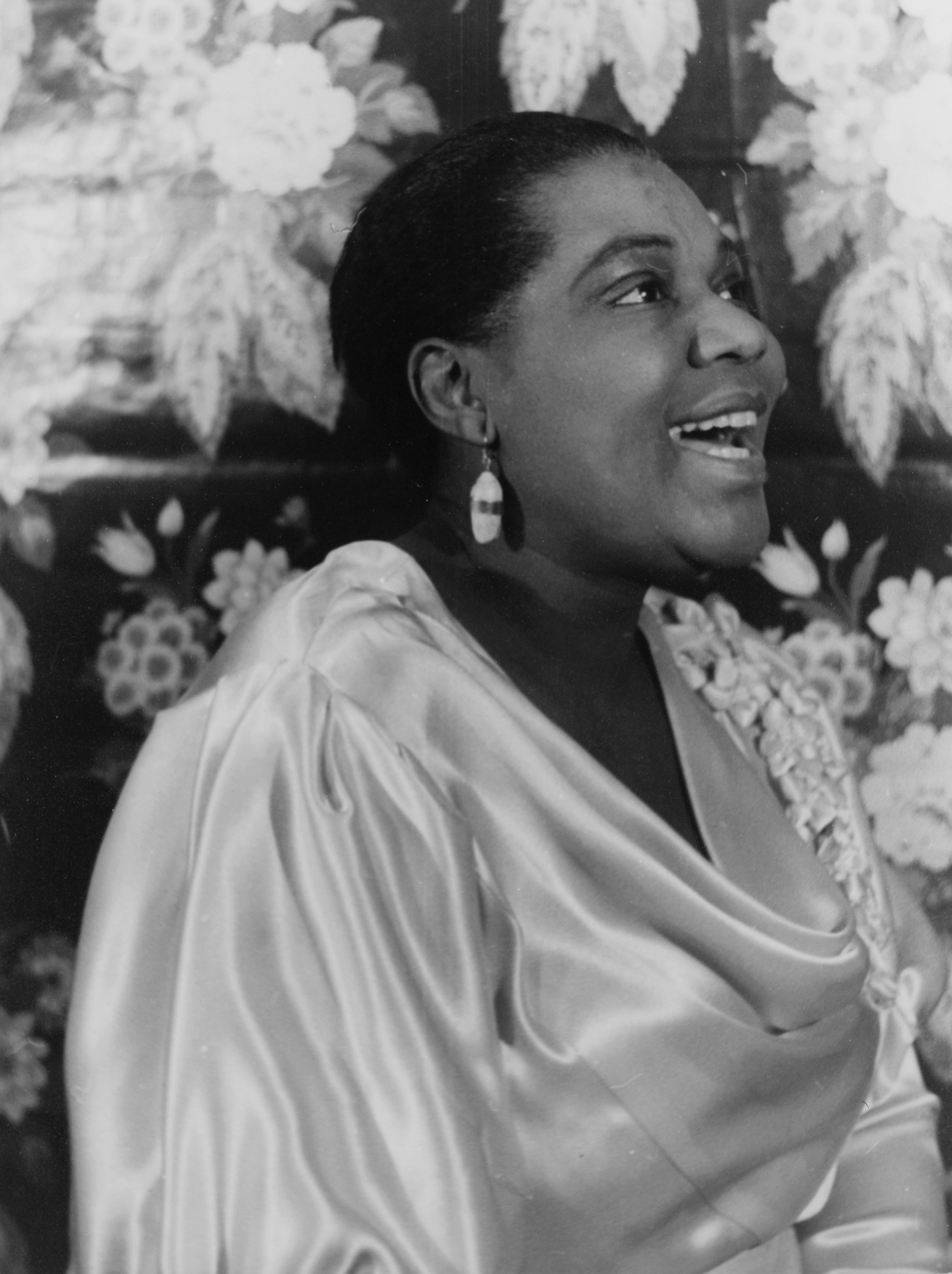
Bessie Smith, 1936

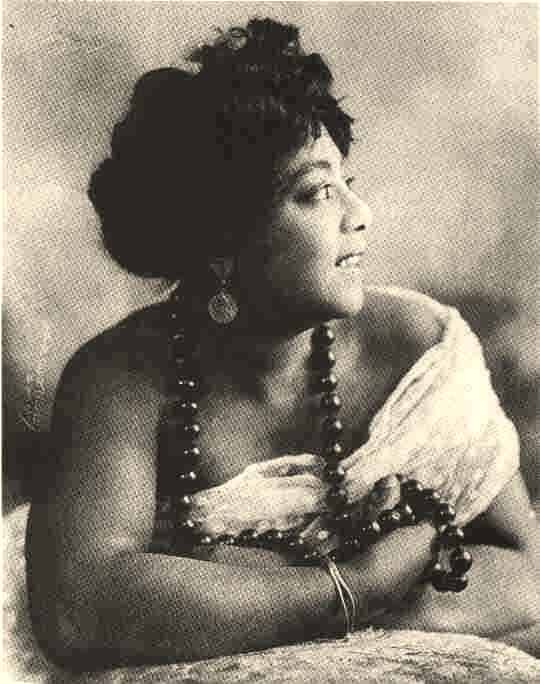
Mamie Smith

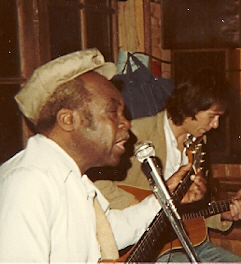
Henry Townsend, 1983

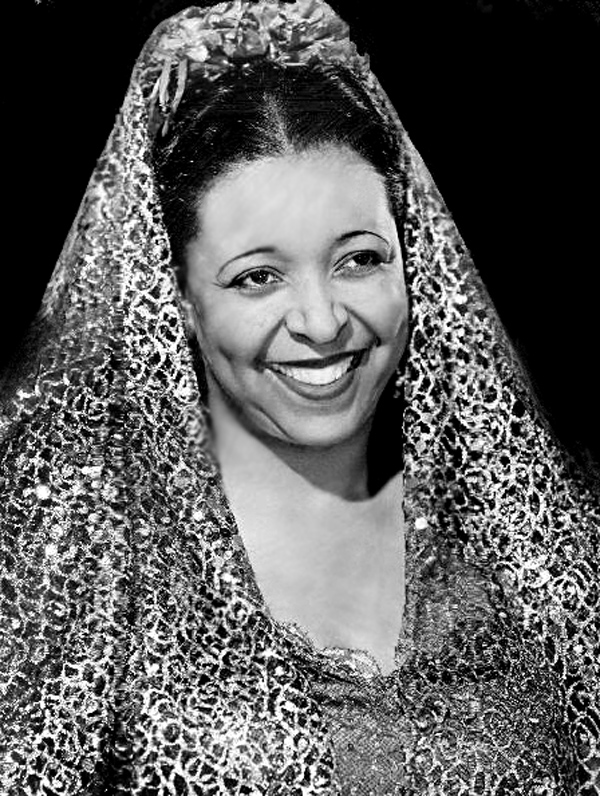
Ethel Waters, 1943

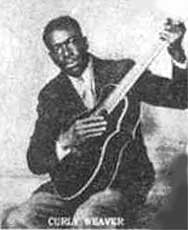
Curley Weaver

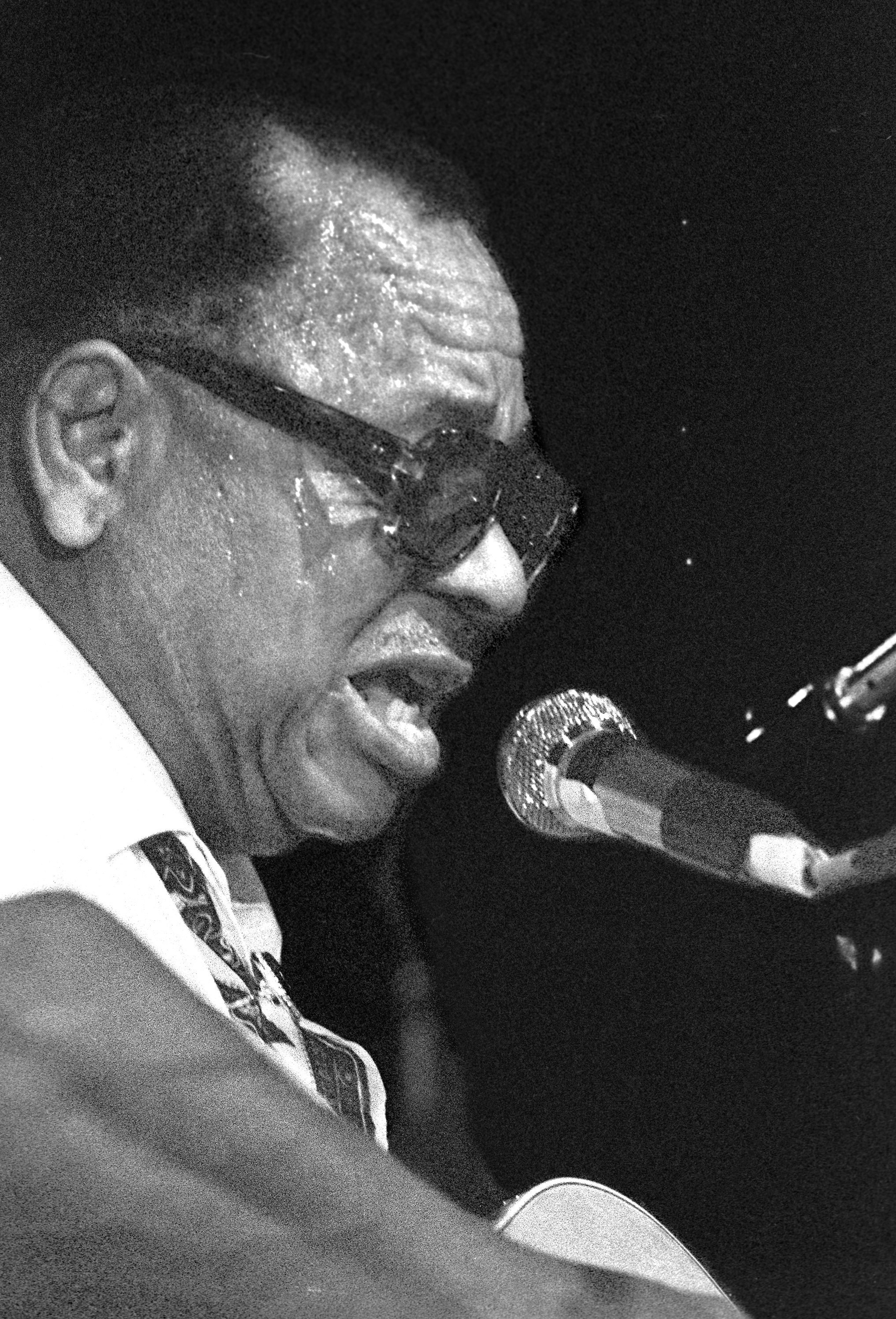
Big Joe Williams, 1971

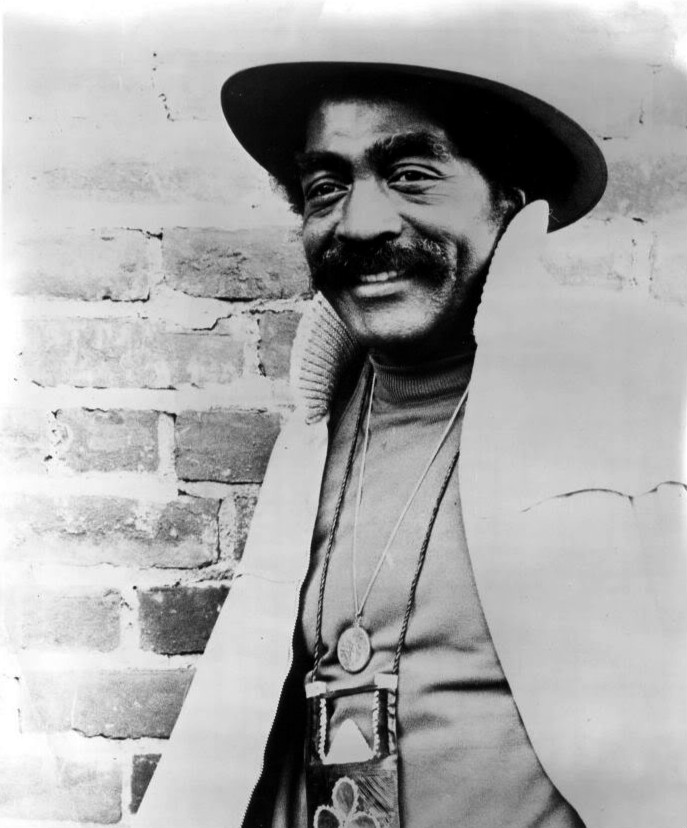
Jimmy Witherspoon, 1974

List of Pre-1940 blues musicians, showing name, birth and death year, origin, primary style, and references
Name	Birth year	Death year	Origin	Primary style	Ref(s)
Mozelle Alderson	1904	1994	Ohio	Country blues	
Alger "Texas" Alexander	1900	1954	Texas	Country blues	
Ora Alexander	c.1909	Unknown	Alabama	Classic female blues	
Albert Ammons	1907	1949	Illinois	Boogie woogie	
Pink Anderson	1900	1974	South Carolina	Piedmont blues	
Kokomo Arnold	1901*	1968	Georgia	Acoustic blues	
Barbecue Bob	1902	1931	Georgia	Acoustic blues	
Ed Bell	1905	1960s	Alabama	Piedmont blues	
Gladys Bentley	1907	1960	Pennsylvania	Vaudeville blues	
Black Ace	1905	1972	Texas	Country blues	
Scrapper Blackwell	1903	1962	North Carolina	Urban blues	
Blind Blake	1896	1934	Florida	Piedmont blues	
Lucille Bogan	1897	1948	Mississippi	Classic female blues	
Ted Bogan	1909	1990	South Carolina	Country blues	
Son Bonds	1909	1947	Tennessee	Country blues	
Big Bill Broonzy	1893*	1958	Mississippi	Urban blues	
Kitty Brown	1899	Unknown	New York	Classic female blues	
Willie Brown	1900	1952	Mississippi	Delta blues	
Bumble Bee Slim	1905	1968	Georgia	Urban blues	
Gus Cannon	1883*	1979	Mississippi	Jug band	
Leroy Carr	1905	1935	Tennessee	Urban blues	
Doctor Clayton	1898	1947	Georgia	Country blues	
Sam Collins	1887	1949	Louisiana	Country blues	
Elizabeth Cotten	1893	1987	North Carolina	Country blues	
Floyd Council	1911	1976	North Carolina	Piedmont blues	
Ida Cox	1896*	1967	Georgia	Vaudeville blues	
Blind Blues Darby	1906	1975	Kentucky	St. Louis blues	
Reverend Gary Davis	1896	1972	South Carolina	Piedmont blues	
Walter Davis	1911*	1963	Mississippi	St. Louis blues	
Tom Delaney	1889	1963	South Carolina	Urban blues	
Georgia Tom Dorsey	1899	1993	Georgia	Urban blues	
Little Buddy Doyle	1911*	1960*	Tennessee	Memphis blues	
Bernice Edwards	1907	1969	Texas	Classic female blues	
Sleepy John Estes	1899*	1977	Tennessee	Country blues	
Ethel Finnie	1898	1981	Louisiana	Classic female blues	
Blind Boy Fuller	1907*	1941	North Carolina	Piedmont blues	
Jesse Fuller	1896	1976	Georgia	Piedmont blues	
Jazz Gillum	1904*	1966	Mississippi	Urban blues	
Boyd Gilmore	1905	1976	Mississippi	Delta blues	
Coot Grant	1893	1970	Alabama	Classic female blues	
Lil Green	1919*	1954	Mississippi	Urban blues	
Shirley Griffith	1907	1974	Mississippi	Country blues	
Richard "Hacksaw" Harney	1902	1973	Mississippi	Delta blues	
Lucille Hegamin	1897*	1970	Georgia	Classic female blues	
Edmonia Henderson	1898	1947	Tennessee	Classic female blues	
Katherine Henderson	1909	Unknown	Missouri	Classic female blues	
Edna Hicks	1895	1925	Louisiana	Classic female blues	
Son House	1902	1988	Mississippi	Delta blues	
Peg Leg Howell	1888	1966	Georgia	Country blues	
Alberta Hunter	1895	1984	Tennessee	Classic female blues	
Mississippi John Hurt	1894*	1966	Mississippi	Country blues	
Jim Jackson	1890*	1937*	Mississippi	Country blues	
Papa Charlie Jackson	1890*	1950*	Louisiana	Country blues	
Skip James	1902	1969	Mississippi	Delta blues	
Blind Lemon Jefferson	1893	1929	Texas	Country blues	
Blind Willie Johnson	1897	1945	Texas	Gospel blues	
Edith North Johnson	1903	1988	Missouri	Classic female blues	
Lonnie Johnson	1899	1970	Louisiana	Urban blues	
Mary Johnson	1898	1983	Mississippi	Classic female blues	
Robert Johnson	1911	1938	Mississippi	Delta blues	
Tommy Johnson	1896	1956	Mississippi	Delta blues	
Little Hat Jones	1899	1981	Texas	Country blues	
Lottie Kimbrough	1893	Unknown	Arkansas	Country blues	
Lead Belly	1889	1949	Louisiana	Country blues	
Furry Lewis	1893*	1981	Mississippi	Country blues	
Meade Lux Lewis	1905	1964	Illinois	Boogie woogie	
Charley Lincoln	1900	1963	Georgia	Country blues	
Mance Lipscomb	1895	1976	Texas	Country blues	
Virginia Liston	1890	1932	Louisiana	Classic female blues	
Robert Lockwood, Jr.	1915	2006	Arkansas	Delta blues	
Cripple Clarence Lofton	1887*	1957	Tennessee	Boogie woogie	
Eddie Mapp	1910	1931	Georgia	Country blues	
Sara Martin	1884	1955	Kentucky	Vaudeville blues	
Lil McClintock	1883	Unknown	U.S.	Country blues	
Kansas Joe McCoy	1905	1950	Mississippi	Country blues	
Papa Charlie McCoy	1909	1959	Mississippi	Delta blues	
Mississippi Fred McDowell	1904	1972	Tennessee	Hill country blues	
Charlie "Specks" McFadden	1895	1966	Illinois	Country blues	
Fred McMullen	1905	Unknown	Florida	Piedmont blues	
Jay McShann	1916	2006	Oklahoma	Blues	
Blind Willie McTell	1901*	1959	Georgia	Country blues	
Memphis Minnie	1897	1973	Louisiana	Memphis blues	
Mississippi Sheiks			Mississippi	Country blues	
Little Brother Montgomery	1906	1985	Louisiana	Barrelhouse blues	
Whistlin' Alex Moore	1899	1989	Texas	Boogie woogie	
Buddy Moss	1914	1984	Georgia	Piedmont blues	
Hambone Willie Newbern	1901	1965	Tennessee	Country blues	
St. Louis Jimmy Oden	1903	1977	Tennessee	Urban blues	
Charley Patton	1891	1934	Mississippi	Delta blues	
Piano Red	1911	1985	Georgia	Boogie woogie	
Buster Pickens	1916	1964	Texas	Country blues	
Joe Pullum	1905	1964	Alabama	Urban blues	
Ma Rainey	1886*	1939	Georgia	Classic female blues	
Red Nelson	1907	1970	Mississippi	Urban blues	
Walter Roland	c.1902 or 1903	1972	Alabama	Boogie woogie	
Jimmy Rushing	1903	1972	Oklahoma	Urban blues	
Dan Sane	1896	1956	Mississippi	Memphis blues	
Alec Seward	1901	1972	Virginia	Piedmont blues	
Robert Shaw	1908	1985	Texas	Boogie woogie	
J.D. Short	1902	1962	Mississippi	Delta blues	
Henry "Son" Sims	1890	1958	Mississippi	Delta blues	
Bessie Smith	1894	1937	Tennessee	Classic female blues	
Clara Smith	1894*	1935	South Carolina	Classic female blues	
J. T. "Funny Papa" Smith	1885*	1940*	U.S.	Country blues	
Mamie Smith	1883	1946	Ohio	Vaudeville blues	
Pinetop Sparks	1910	1935	Mississippi	Boogie woogie	
Speckled Red	1892	1973	Louisiana	Boogie woogie	
Victoria Spivey	1906	1976	Texas	Vaudeville blues	
Frank Stokes	1888*	1955	Tennessee	Memphis blues	
Roosevelt Sykes	1913	1984	Arkansas	Urban blues	
Tampa Red	1904	1981	Georgia	Urban blues	
Johnny Temple	1906	1968	Mississippi	Delta blues	
Henry Thomas	1874	1930*	Texas	Country blues	
Ramblin' Thomas	Unknown	Unknown	Louisiana	Country blues	
Henry Townsend	1909	2006	Mississippi	St. Louis blues	
Willie Trice	1910	1977	North Carolina	Piedmont blues	
Bessie Tucker	c.1906	1933	Texas	Country blues	
Walter Vinson	1901	1975	Mississippi	Country blues	
Sippie Wallace	1898	1986	Arkansas	Classic female blues	
Washboard Sam	1910	1966	Arkansas	Country blues	
Ethel Waters	1896	1977	Pennsylvania	Urban blues	
Curley Weaver	1906	1962	Georgia	Country blues	
Sylvester Weaver	1897*	1960	Kentucky	Country blues	
Casey Bill Weldon	1909	Unknown	Arkansas	Country blues	
Peetie Wheatstraw	1902	1941	Tennessee	St. Louis blues	
Bukka White	1909	1977	Mississippi	Delta blues	
Josh White	1908	1969	South Carolina	Country blues	
Big Joe Williams	1903	1982	Mississippi	Delta blues	
Sonny Boy Williamson I	1914	1948	Tennessee	Urban blues	
Ralph Willis	1910*	1957	Alabama	Piedmont blues	
Oscar "Buddy" Woods	1903	1955	Louisiana	Urban blues	
An asterisk (*) denotes that other sources give different dates, origin, or style.

== 1940–1979 blues ==
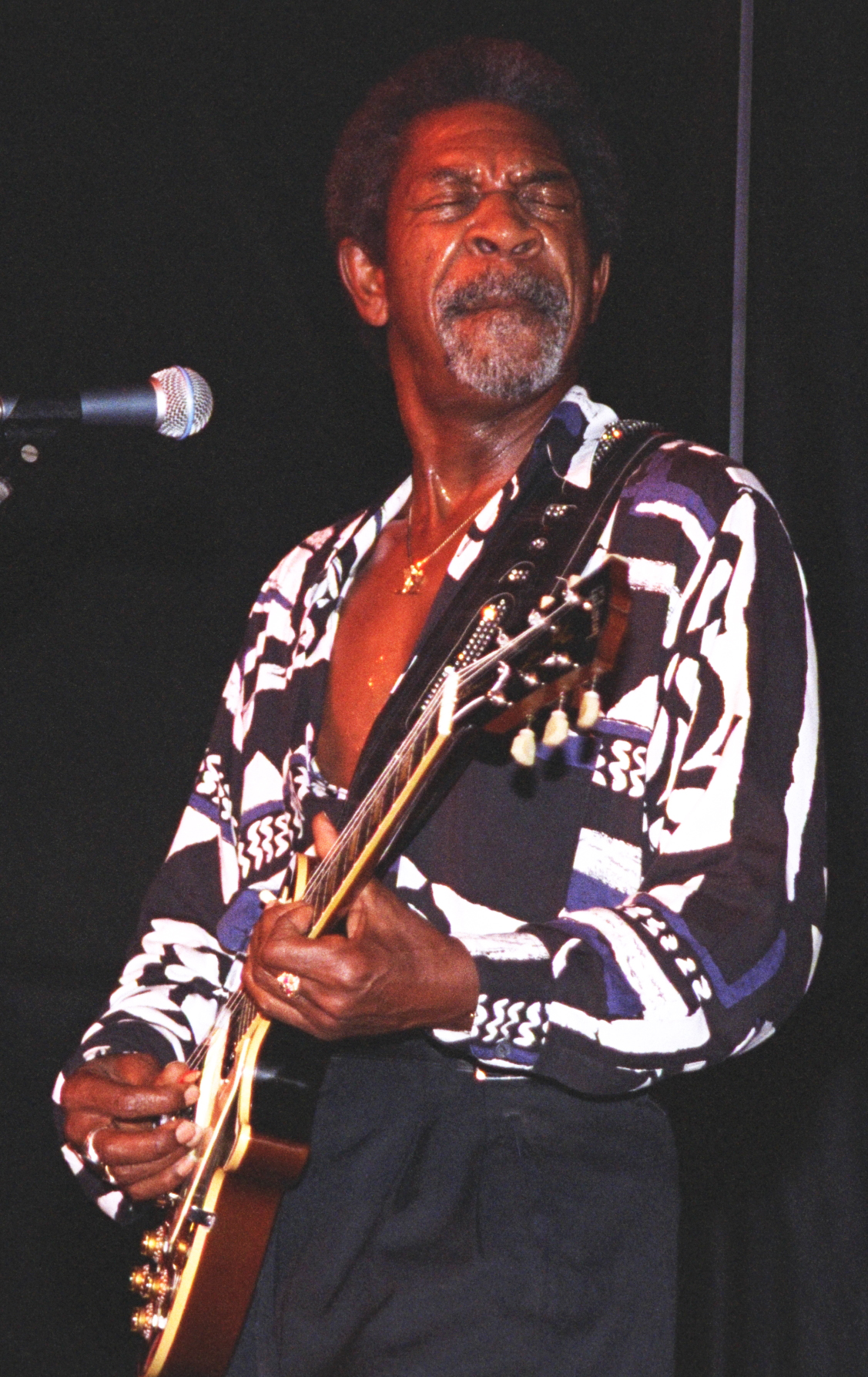
Luther Allison

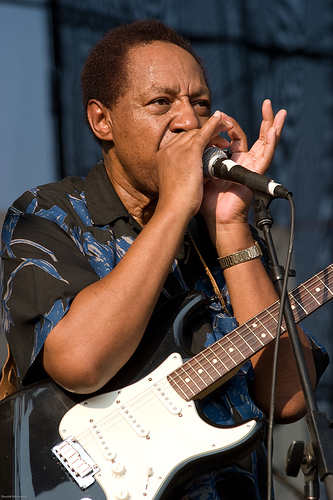
Billy Boy Arnold

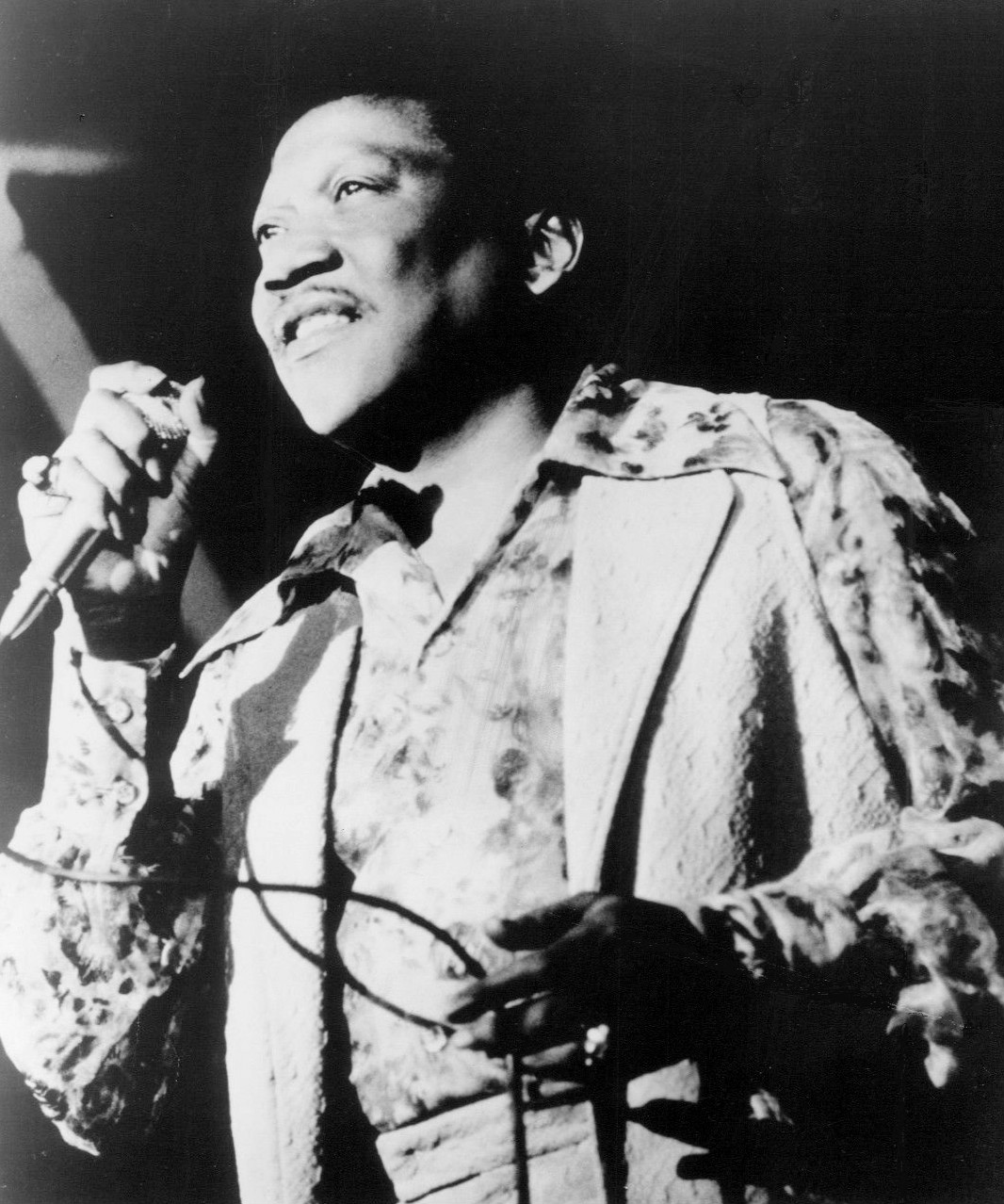
Bobby "Blue" Bland

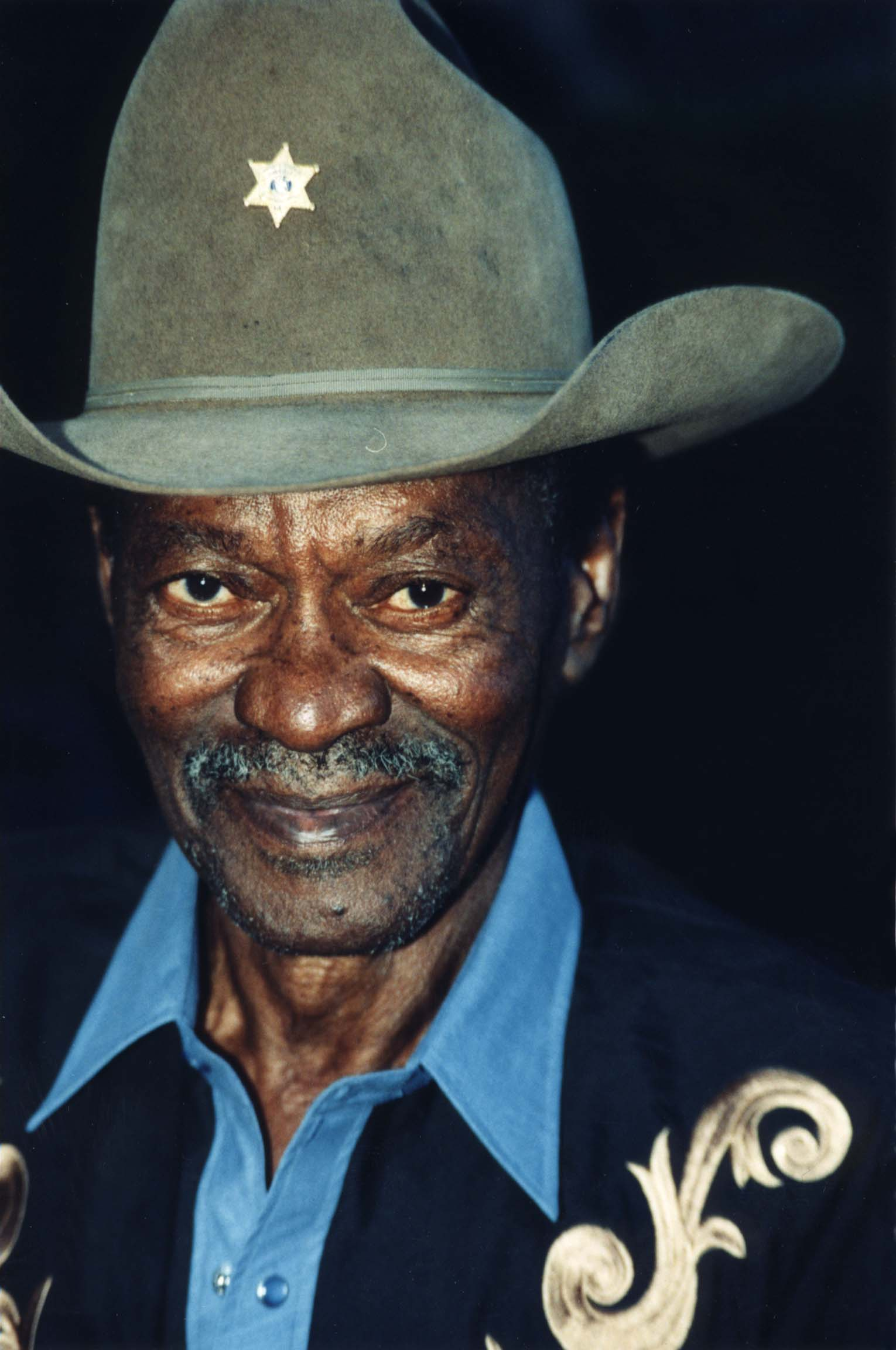
Clarence "Gatemouth" Brown, 1999

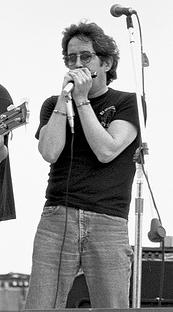
Paul Butterfield at Woodstock Reunion, 1979

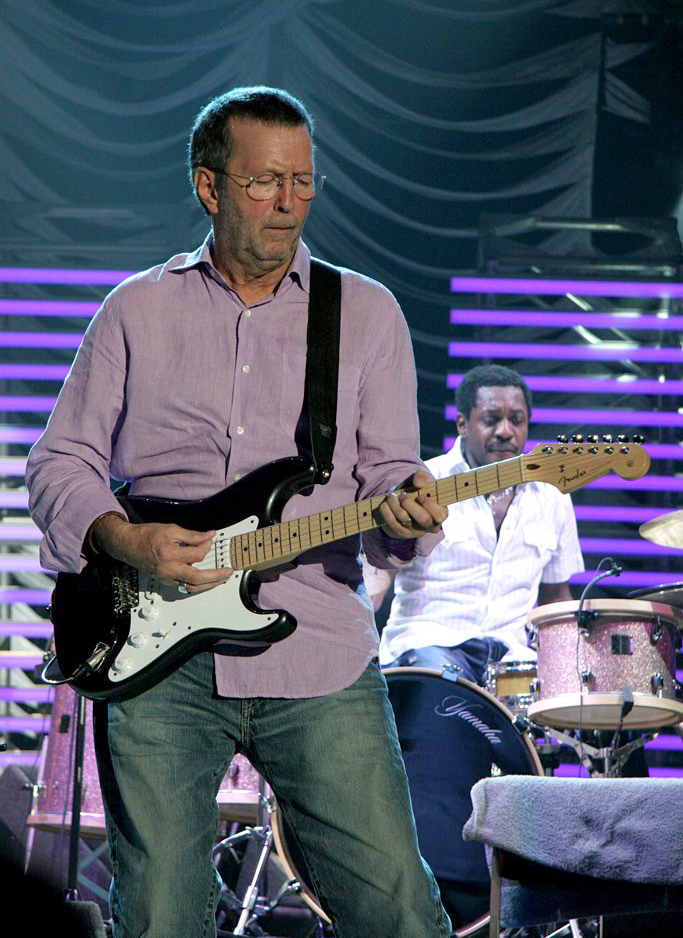
Eric Clapton, 2006

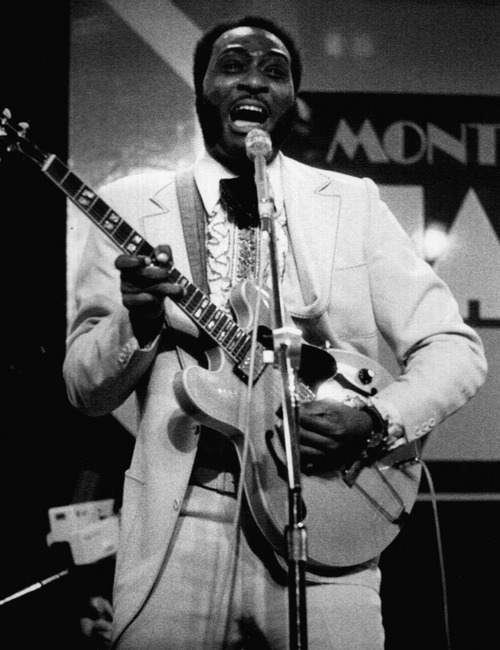
Eddie Clearwater in Montreux, 1978

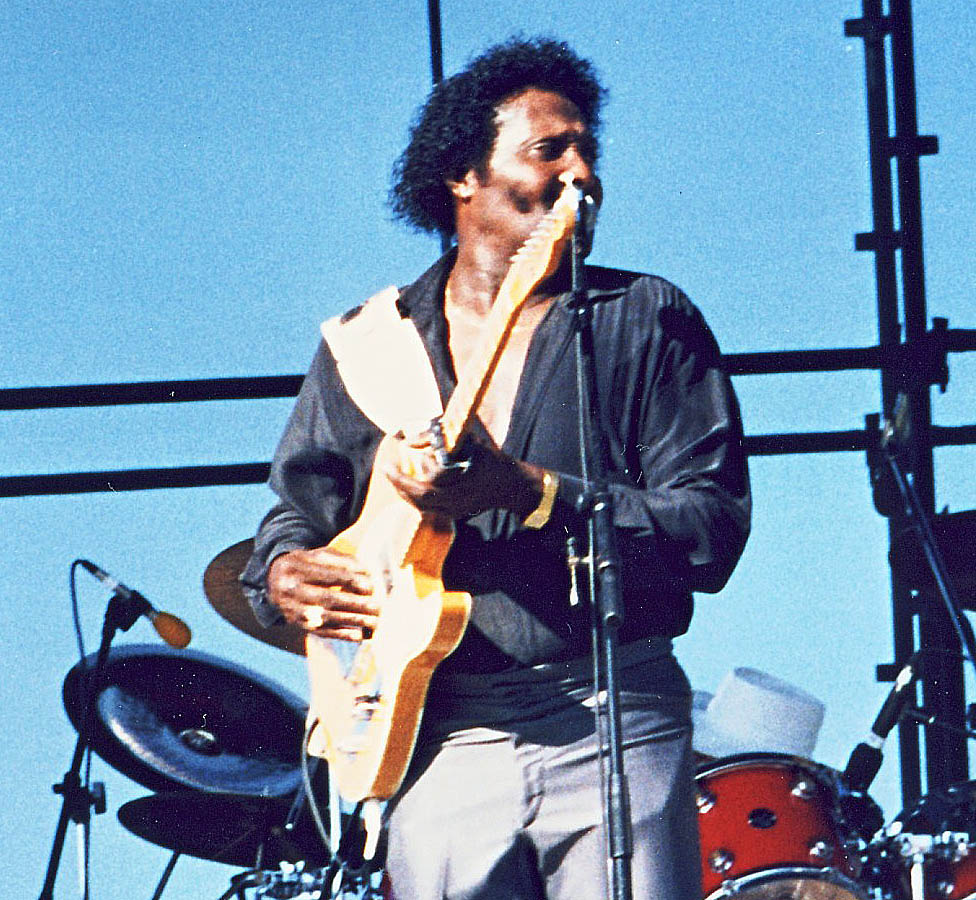
Albert Collins at Long Beach Blues Festival, 1990

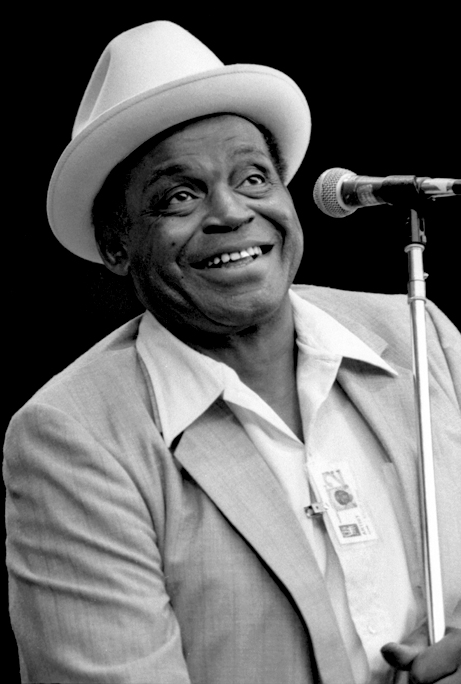
Willie Dixon at Monterey Jazz Festival, 1981

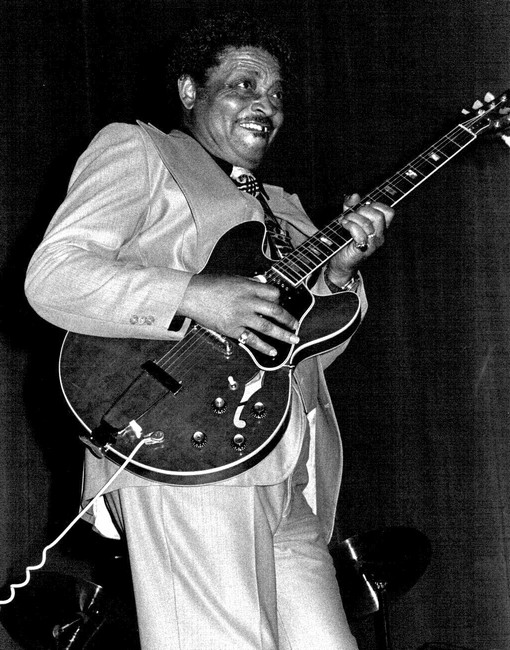
Lowell Fulson in Paris, 1980

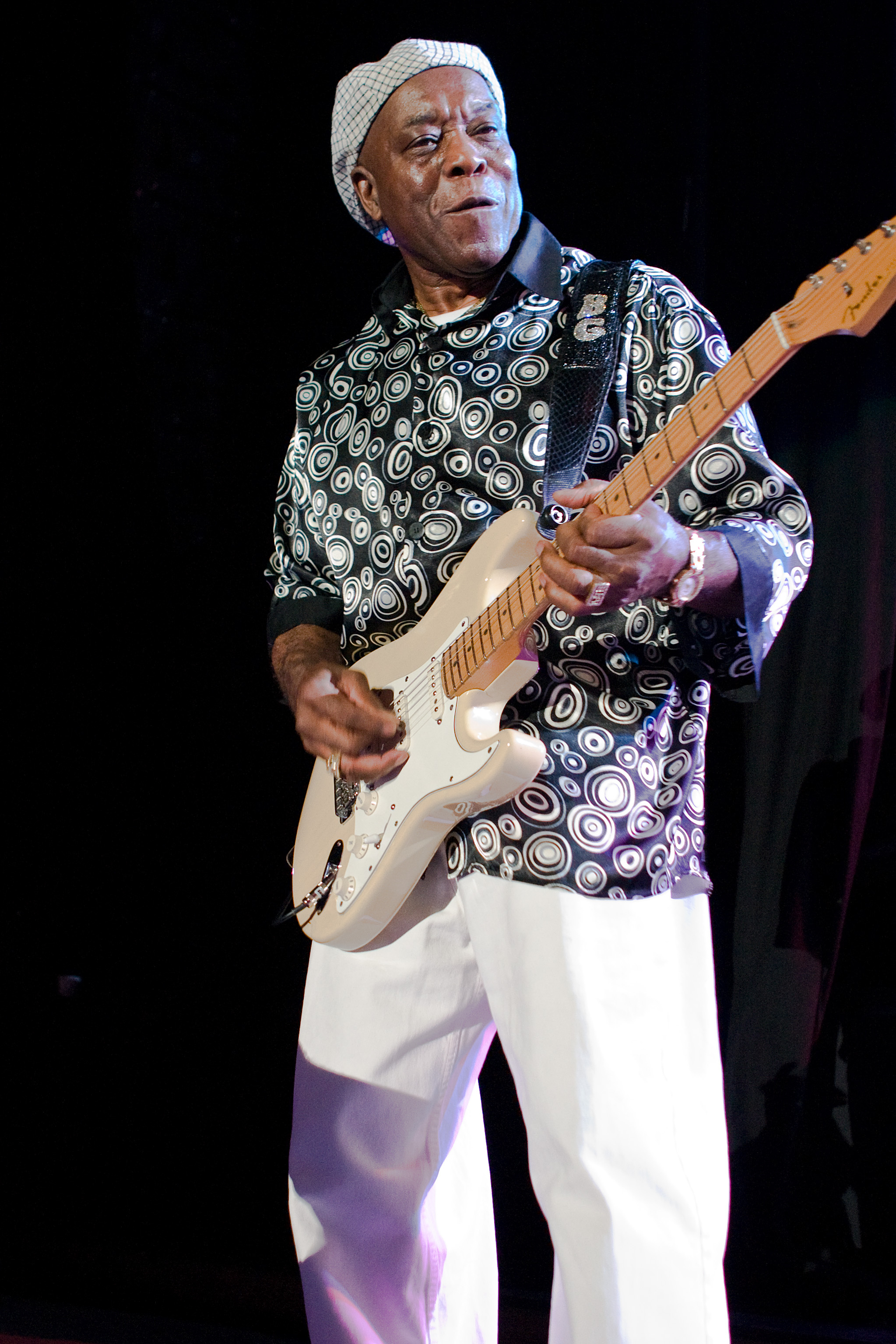
Buddy Guy, 2008

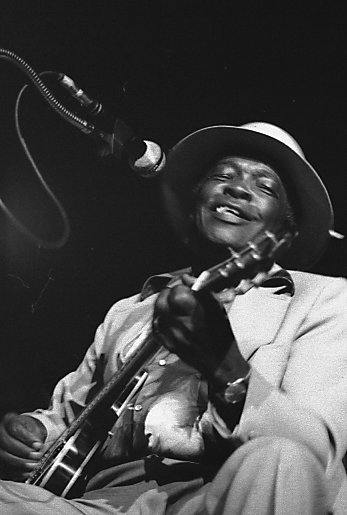
John Lee Hooker in Toronto, 1978

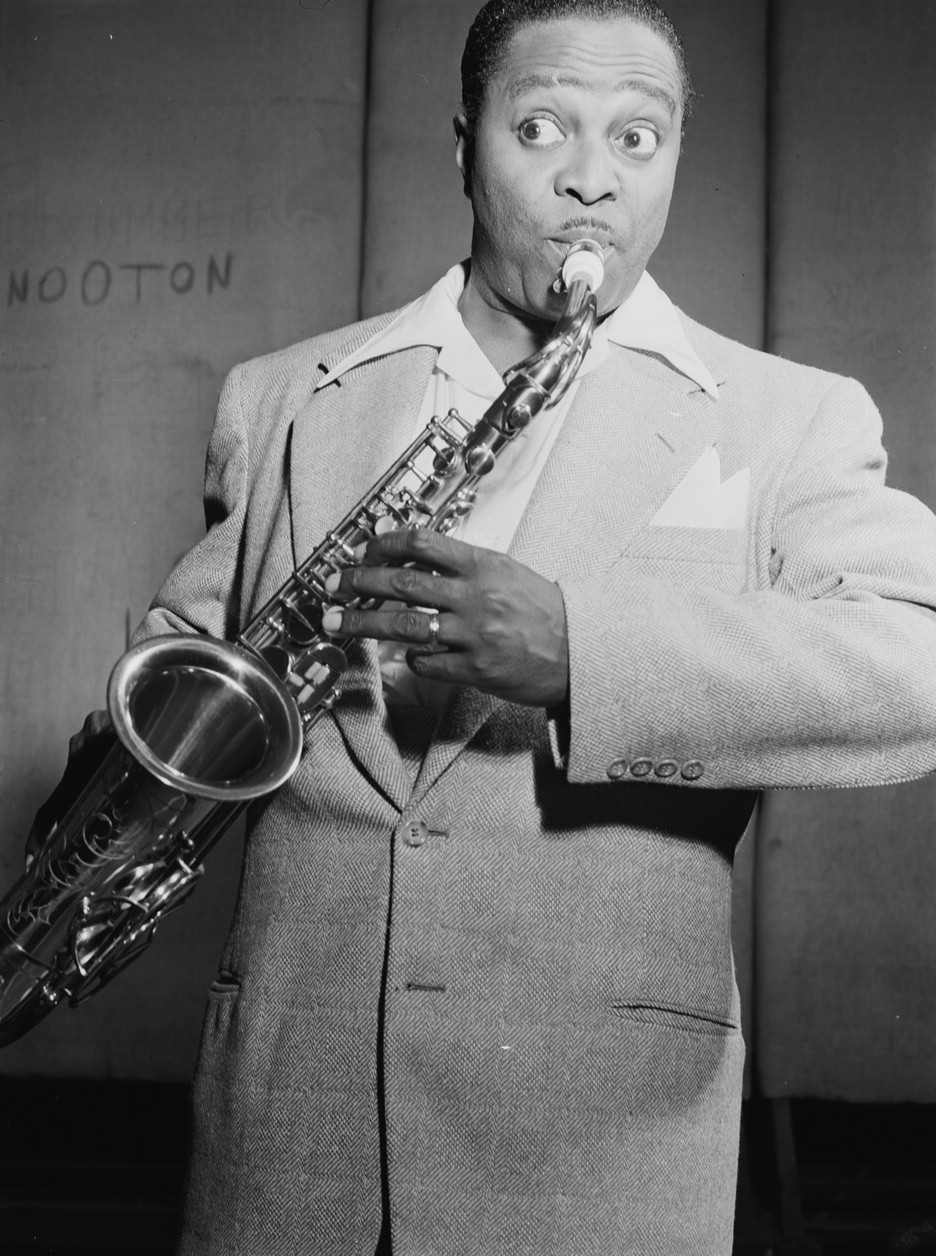
Louis Jordan in New York City, 1946

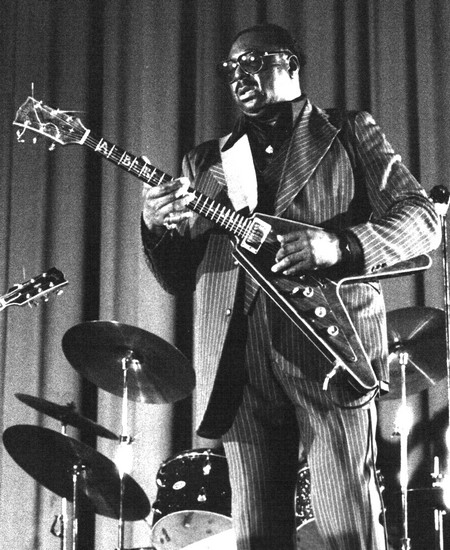
Albert King in Paris, 1978

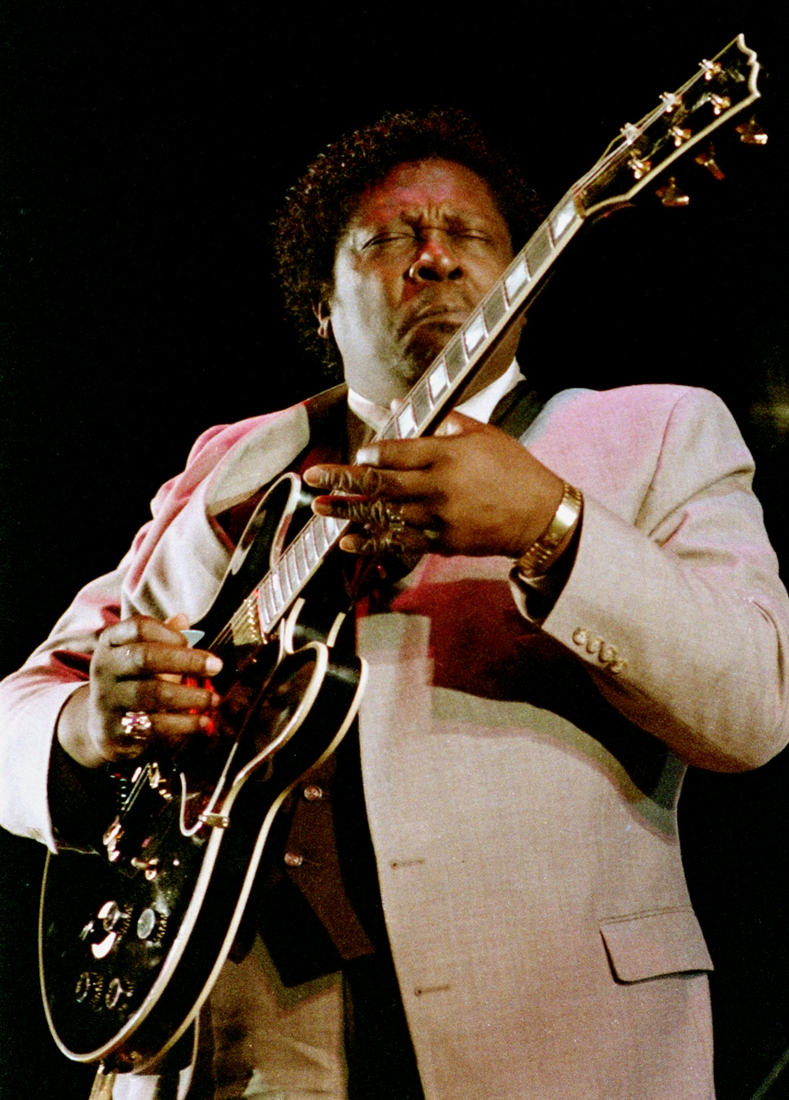
B.B. King in Rome, 1984

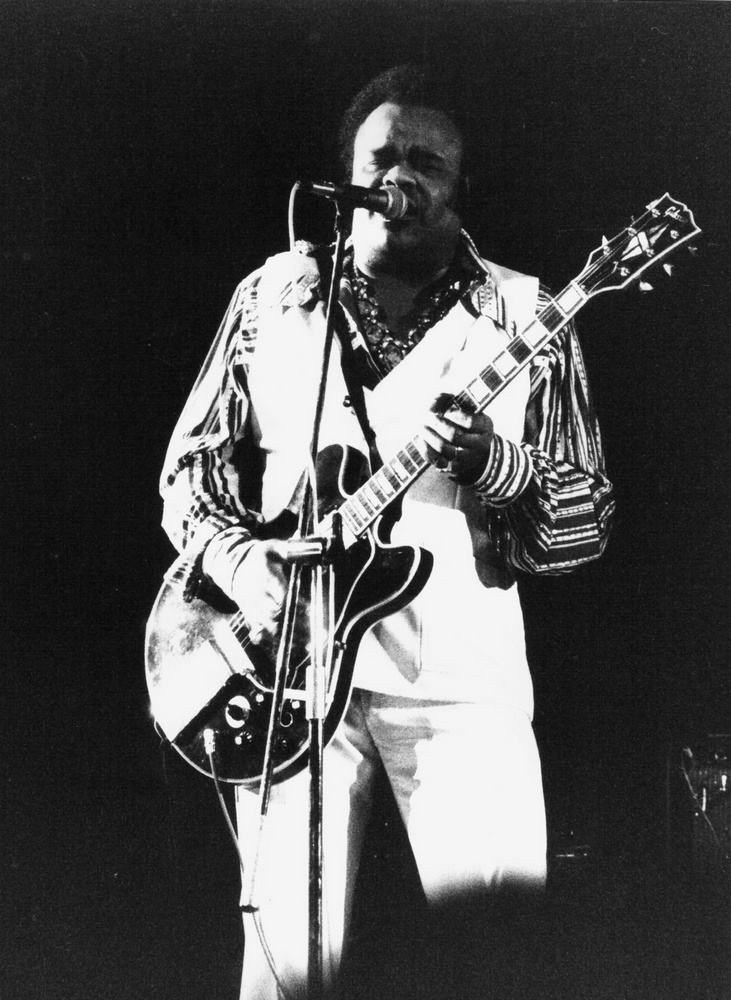
Freddie King in Paris, 1975

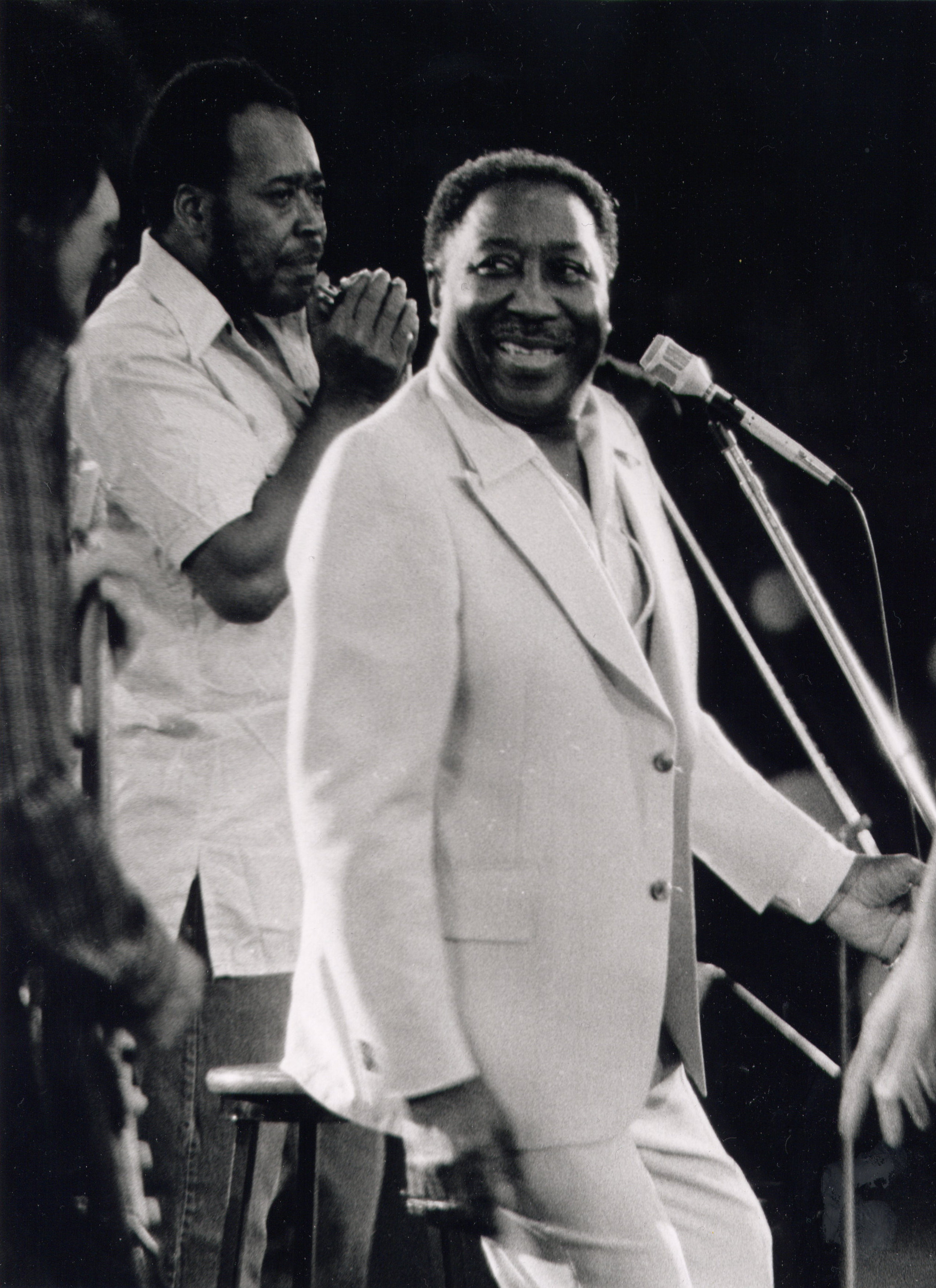
Muddy Waters with James Cotton, 1971

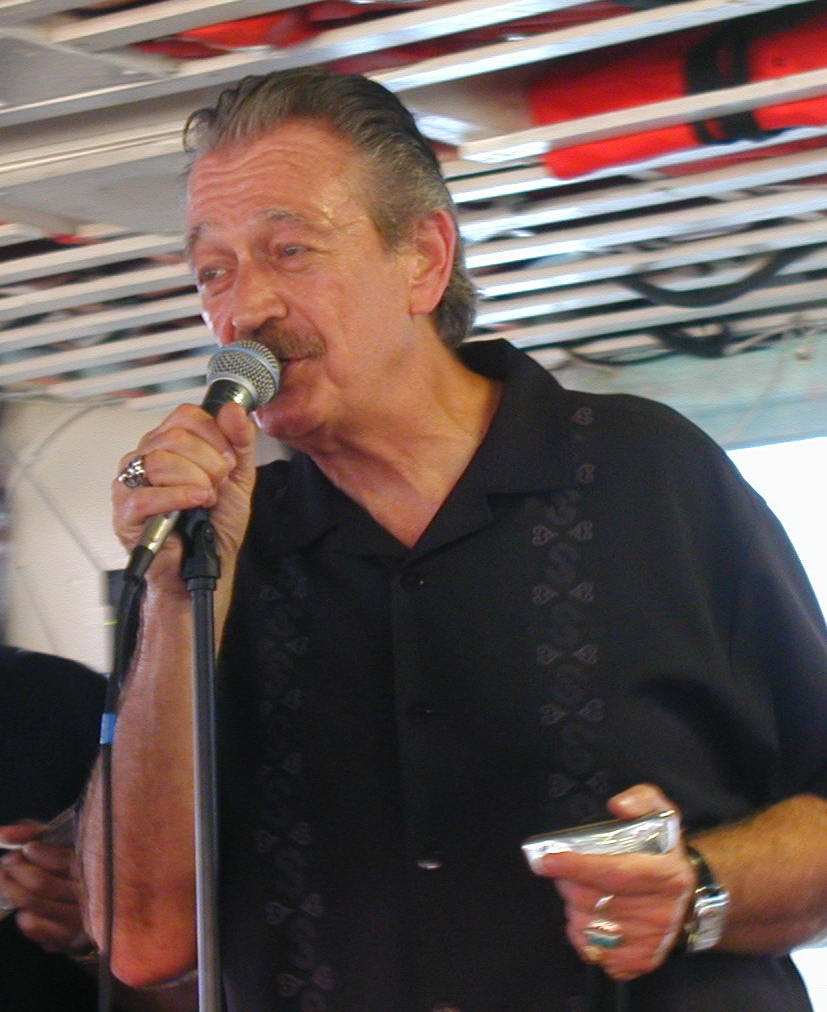
Charlie Musselwhite, 2003

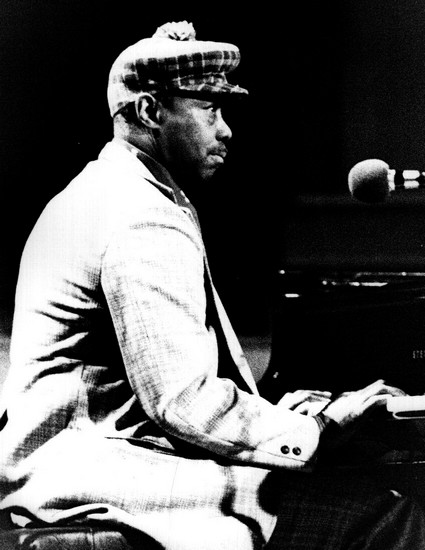
Pinetop Perkins in Paris, 1976

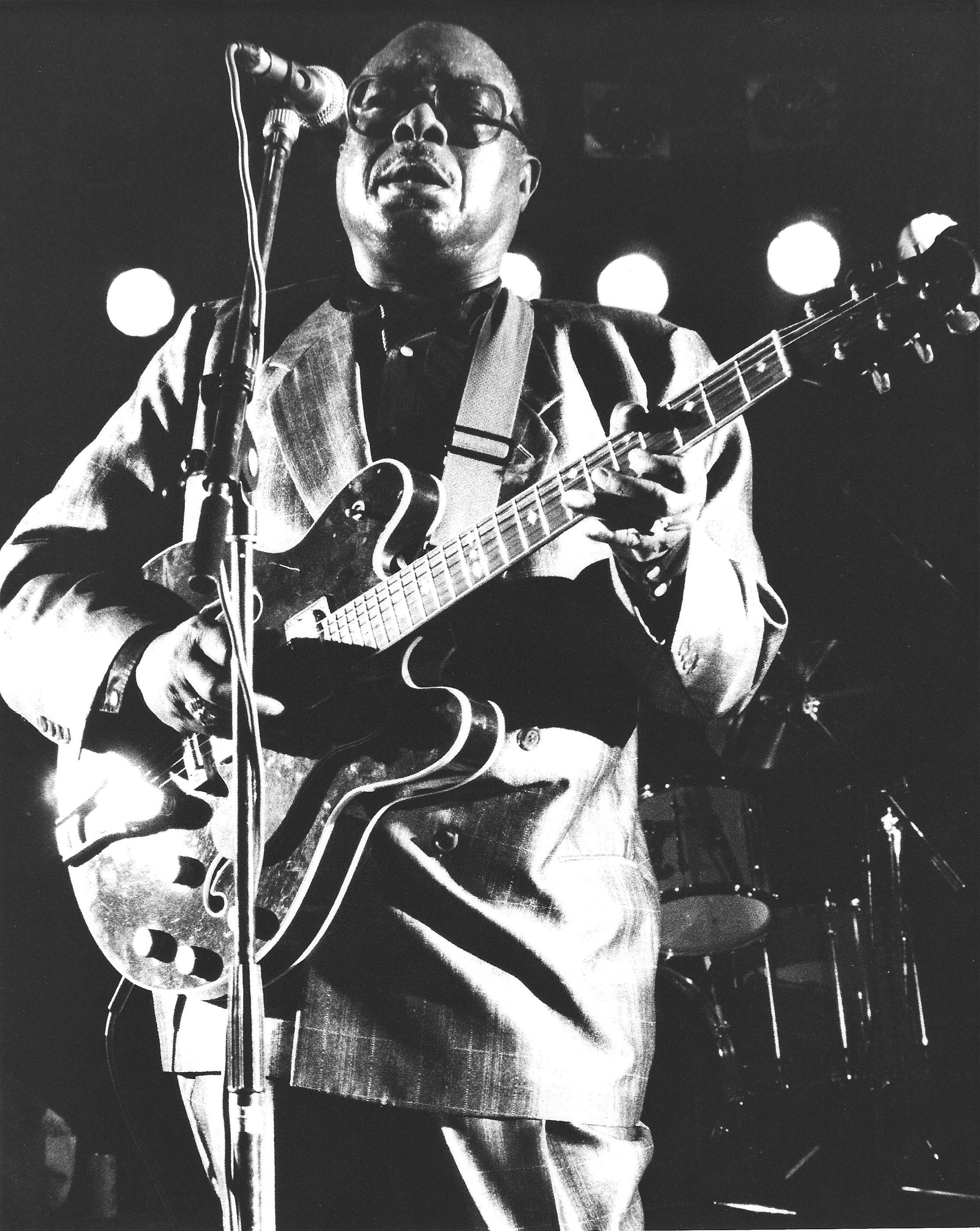
Jimmy Rogers, 1991

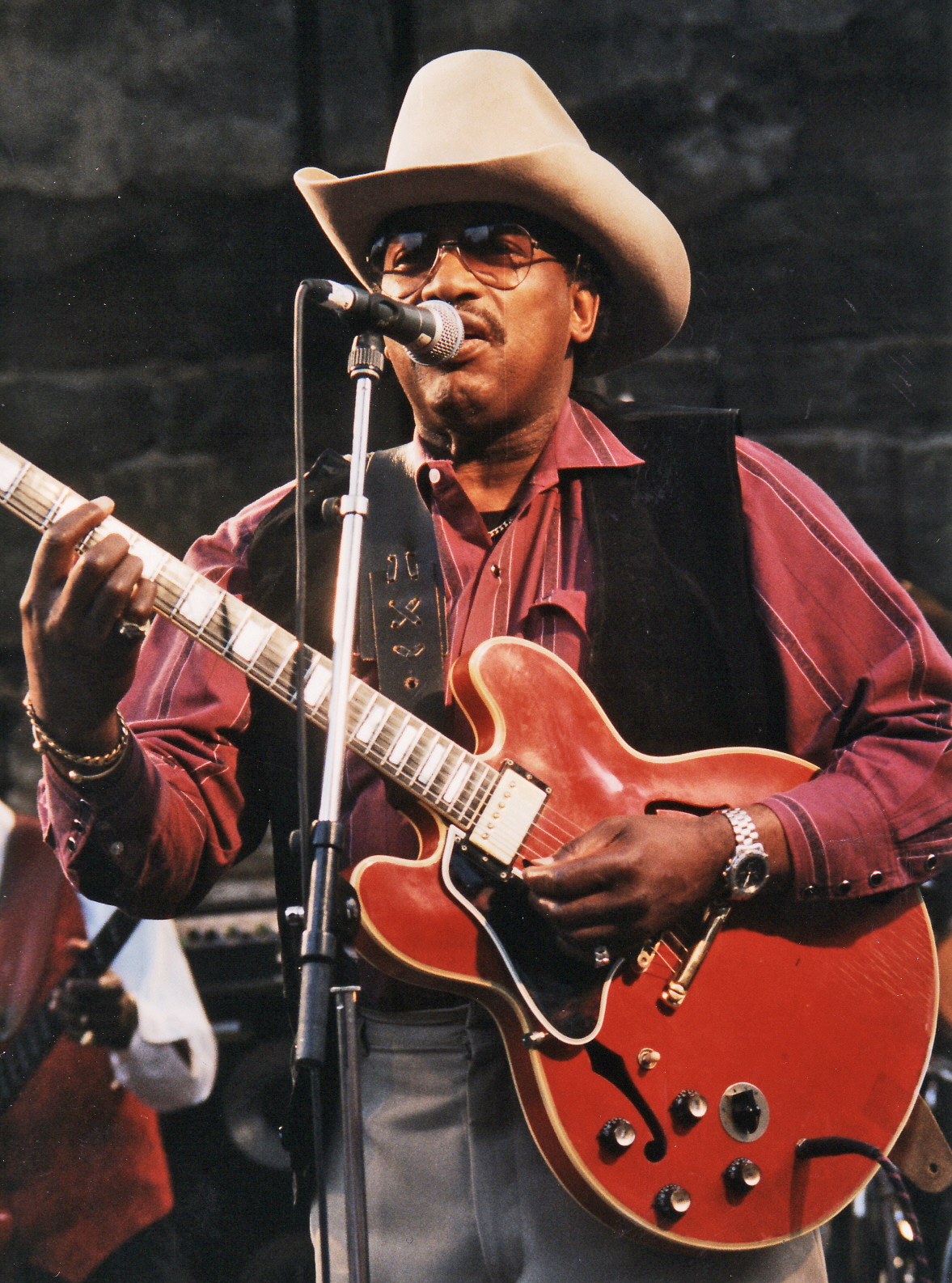
Otis Rush, 1997

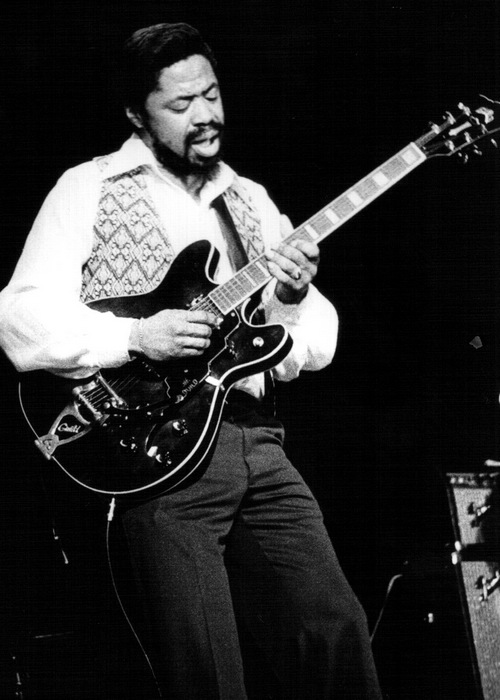
Son Seals, 1977

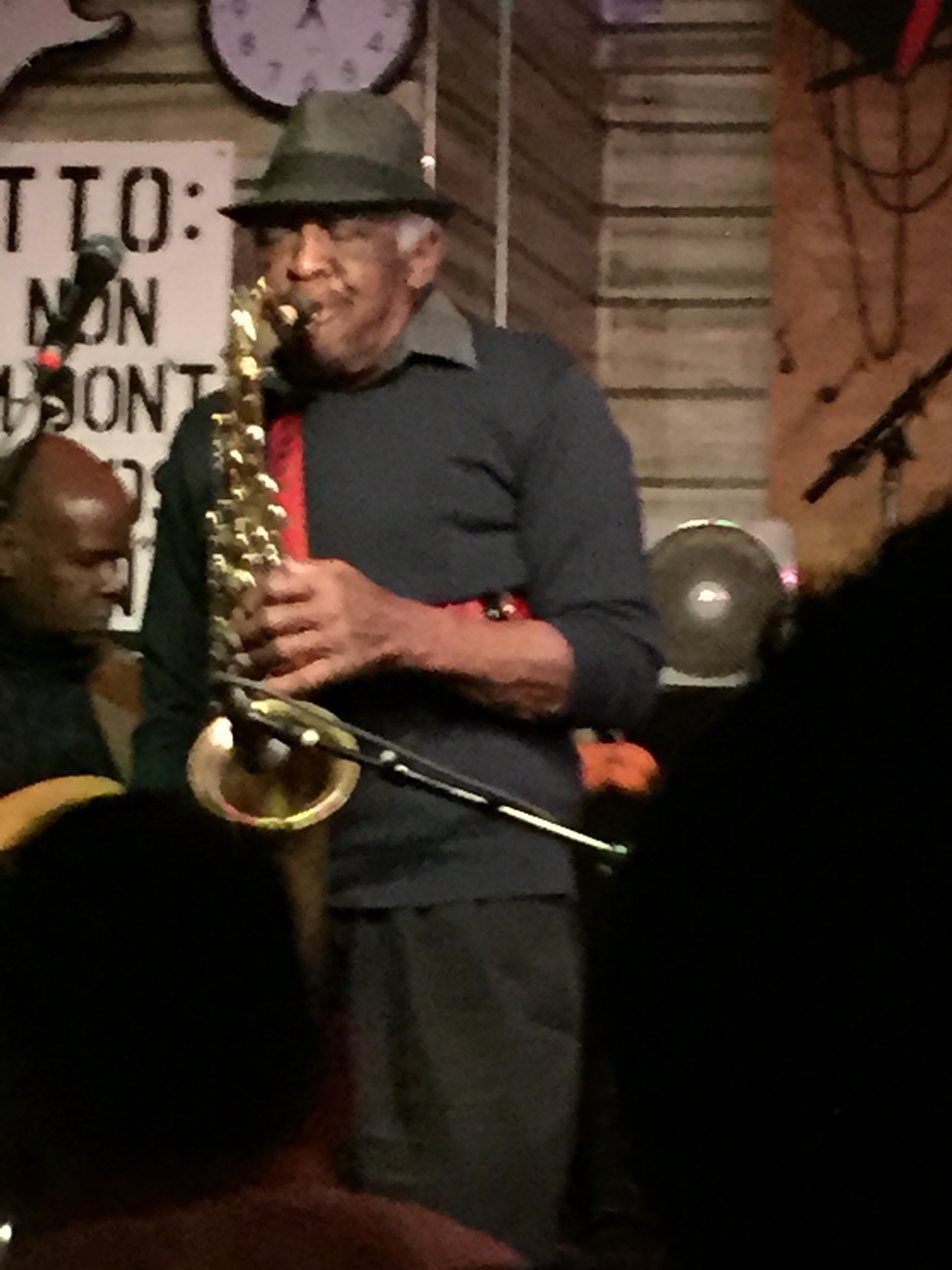
Eddie Shaw, 2015

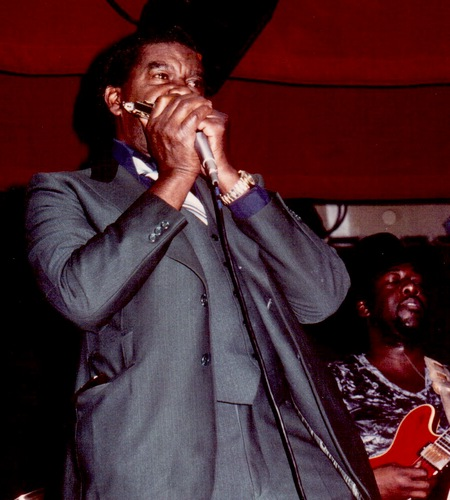
George "Harmonica" Smith, 1980

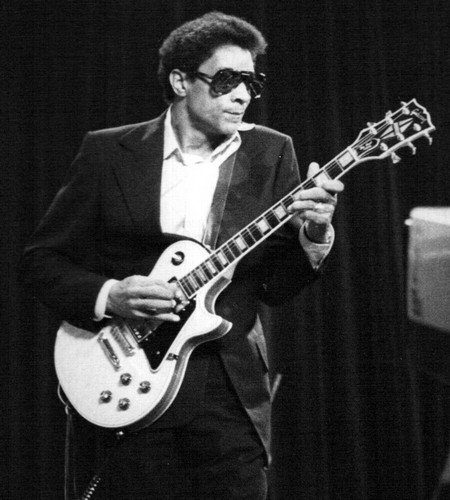
Hubert Sumlin in Montreux, 1978

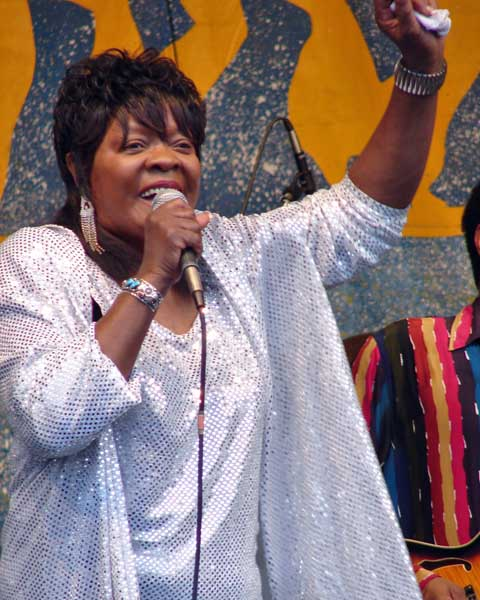
Koko Taylor, 2006

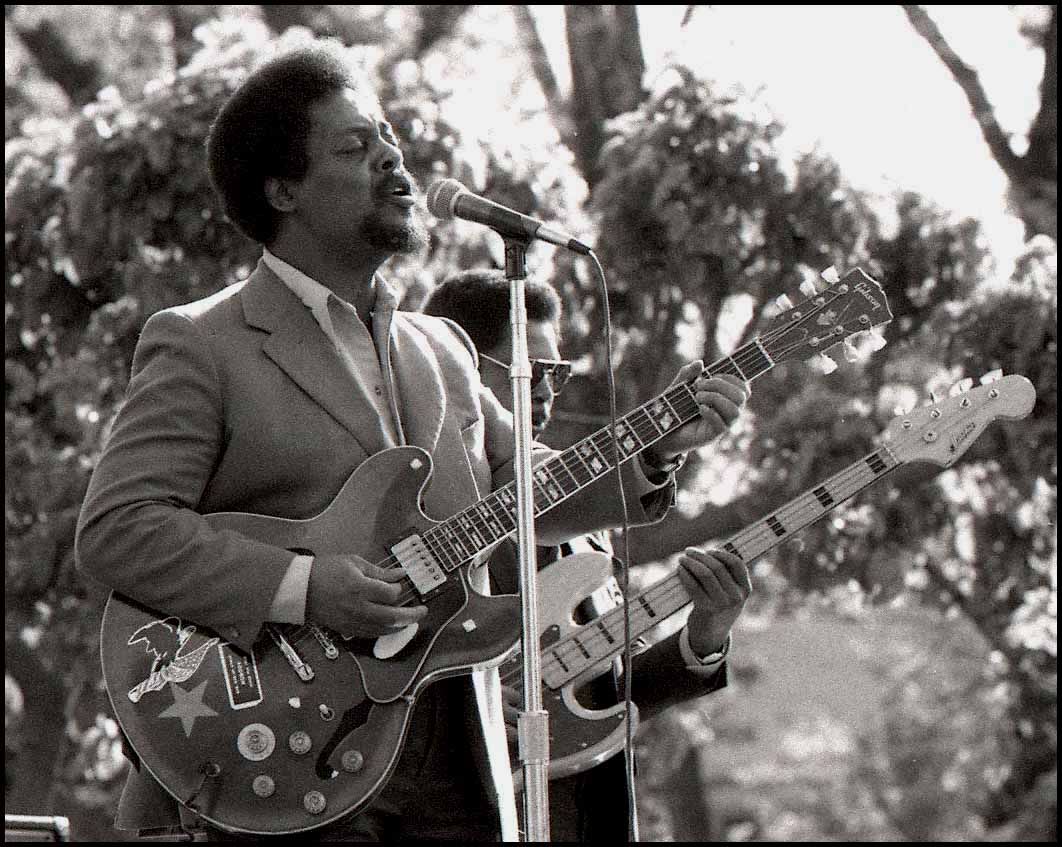
Luther Tucker, 1964

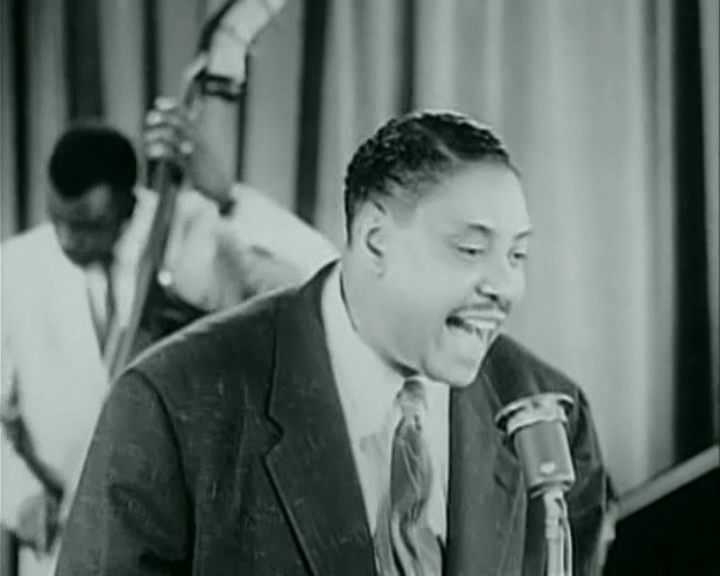
Big Joe Turner, 1955

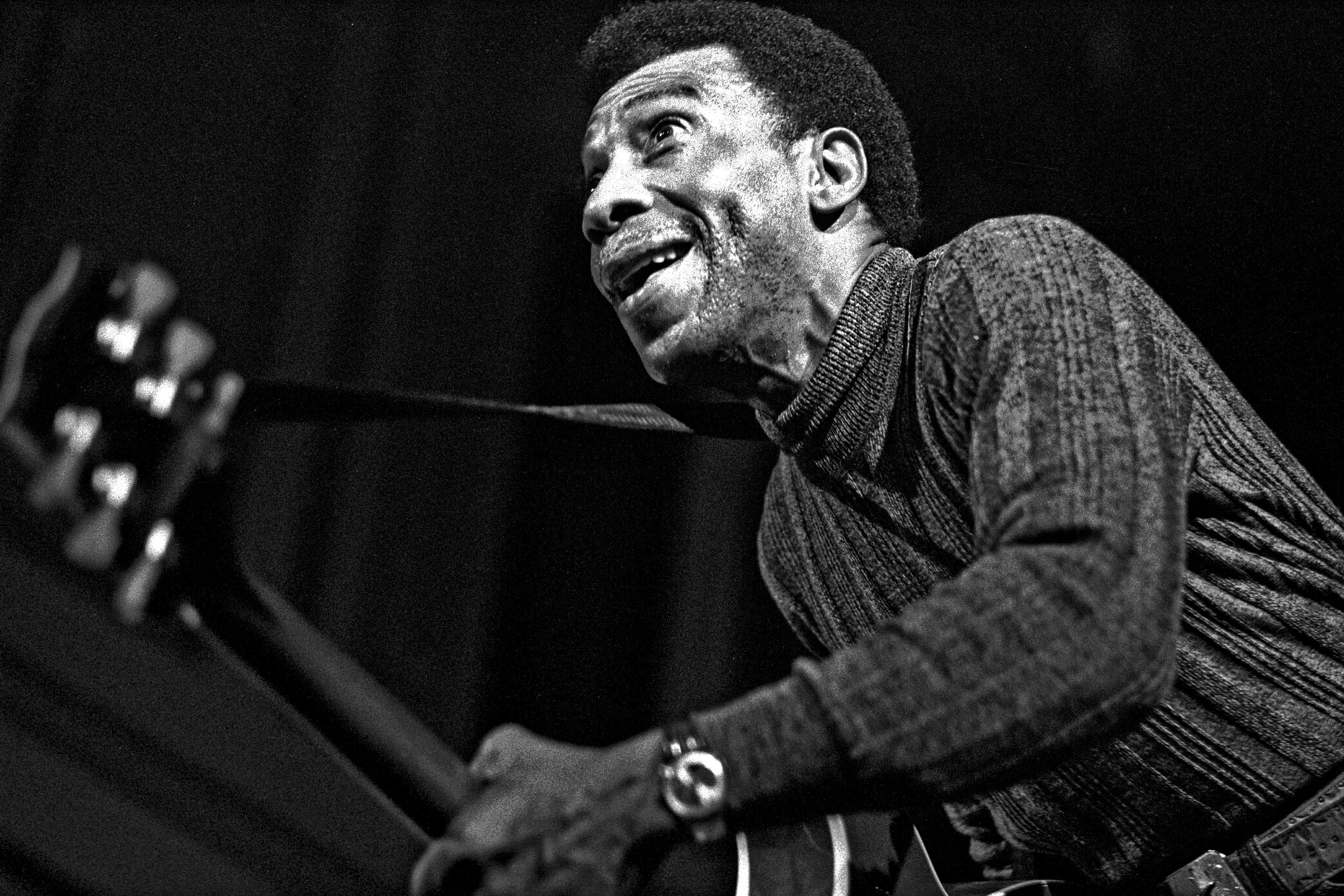
T-Bone Walker at American Folk Blues Festival, Hamburg, 1972

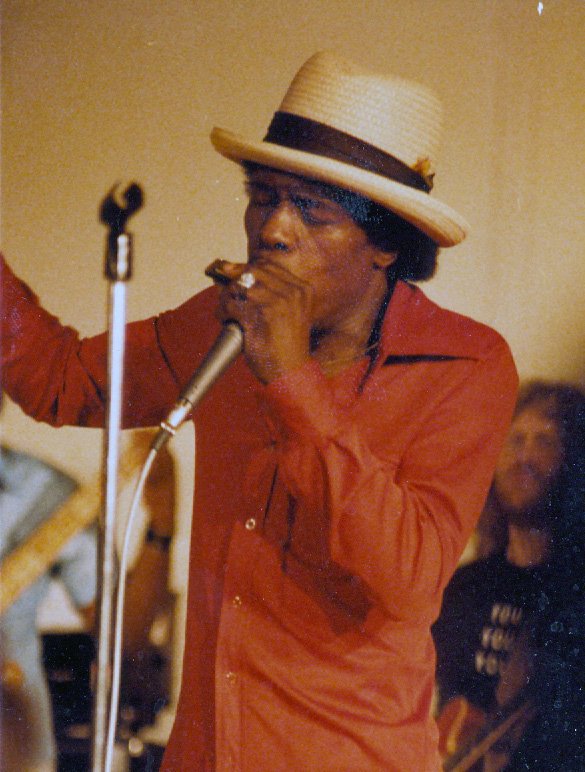
Junior Wells, 1983

List of 1940–1979 blues musicians, showing name, birth and death years, origin, primary style, and references
Name	Birth year	Death year	Origin	Primary style	Ref(s)
The Aces			Illinois	Chicago blues	
Woodrow Adams	1917	1988	Mississippi	Electric blues	
Luther Allison	1939	1997	Arkansas	Chicago blues	
Mose Allison	1927	2016	Mississippi	Urban blues	
Kip Anderson	1938	2007	South Carolina	Soul blues	
Etta Baker	1913	2006	North Carolina	Country blues	
John Henry Barbee	1905	1964	Tennessee	Acoustic blues	
Lou Ann Barton	1954		Texas	Electric blues	
Johnnie Bassett	1935	2012	Florida	Electric blues	
Lefty Bates	1920	2007	Alabama	Chicago blues	
Carey Bell	1936	2007	Mississippi	Chicago blues	
Buster Benton	1932	1996	Arkansas	Chicago blues	
Roy Book Binder	1943	2026	New York	Acoustic blues	
Elvin Bishop	1942		California	Electric blues	
Bobby Bland	1930	2013	Tennessee	Soul blues	
Rory Block	1949		New Jersey	Country blues	
Mike Bloomfield	1943	1981	Illinois	Electric blues	
Boogie Woogie Red	1925	1985*	Louisiana	Boogie woogie	
Eddie Boyd	1914	1994	Mississippi	Chicago blues	
Lonnie Brooks	1933	2017	Louisiana	Electric blues	
Charles Brown	1922	1999	Texas	West Coast blues	
Clarence "Gatemouth" Brown	1924*	2005	Louisiana	Electric blues	
Roy Brown	1925*	1981	Louisiana	Jump blues	
Walter Brown	1917	1956	Texas	Memphis blues	
Roy Buchanan	1939	1988	Alabama	Electric blues	
George "Mojo" Buford	1929	2011	Mississippi	Chicago blues	
Eddie "Guitar" Burns	1928	2012	Mississippi	Detroit blues	
R. L. Burnside	1926	2005	Mississippi	Hill country blues	
Aron Burton	1938	2016	Mississippi	Chicago blues	
Paul Butterfield	1942	1987	Illinois	Electric blues	
Carolina Slim	1923	1953	North Carolina	Piedmont blues	
Eric Clapton	1945		England	Electric blues	
Willie Cobbs	1932	2021	Arkansas	Electric blues	
Albert Collins	1932	1993	Texas	Electric blues	
Johnny Copeland	1937	1997	Louisiana	Texas blues	
James Cotton	1935	2017	Mississippi	Chicago blues	
Pee Wee Crayton	1914	1985	Texas	West Coast blues	
Arthur "Big Boy" Crudup	1905	1974	Mississippi	Urban blues	
James Crutchfield	1912	2001	Louisiana	Barrelhouse blues	
Cyril Davies	1932	1964	England	Electric blues	
Blind John Davis	1913	1985	Mississippi	Urban blues	
James "Thunderbird" Davis	1938	1991*	Alabama	Electric blues	
Larry Davis	1936	1994	Arkansas*	Texas blues	
Maxwell Street Jimmy Davis	1925	1995	Mississippi	Electric blues	
Jimmy Dawkins	1936	2013	Mississippi	Chicago blues	
Floyd Dixon	1929	2006	Texas	West Coast blues	
Willie Dixon	1915	1992	Mississippi	Chicago blues	
Champion Jack Dupree	1910*	1992	Louisiana	Louisiana blues	
Big Joe Duskin	1921	2007	Alabama	Barrelhouse blues	
Johnny Dyer	1938	2014	Mississippi	Electric blues	
Snooks Eaglin	1936	2009	Louisiana	Electric blues	
Archie Edwards	1918	1998	Virginia	Country blues	
David "Honeyboy" Edwards	1915	2011	Mississippi	Electric blues	
Robert "Big Mojo" Elem	1931*	1997	Mississippi	Delta blues	
Margie Evans	1939	2021	Louisiana	Electric blues	
The Fabulous Thunderbirds			Texas	Texas blues	
Turner Foddrell	1928	1995	Virginia	Acoustic blues	
Forest City Joe	1926	1960	Arkansas	Electric blues	
"Baby Face" Leroy Foster	1923	1958	Mississippi	Chicago blues	
Guitar Pete Franklin	1928	1975	Indiana	Electric blues	
Calvin Frazier	1915	1972	Arkansas	Detroit blues	
Denny Freeman	1944	2021	Florida	Texas blues	
Johnny Fuller	1929	1985	Mississippi	West Coast blues	
Lowell Fulson	1921	1999	Oklahoma	West Coast blues	
Bob Gaddy	1924	1997	West Virginia	Urban blues	
Rory Gallagher	1948	1995	Ireland	Electric blues	
Clarence Garlow	1911	1986	Louisiana	Louisiana blues	
Lee Gates	1937	2020	Mississippi	Electric blues	
Lacy Gibson	1936	2011	North Carolina	Chicago blues	
Good Rockin' Charles	1933	1989	Alabama	Chicago blues	
Henry Gray	1925	2020	Louisiana	Chicago blues	
L.C. Green	1921	1985	Mississippi	Electric blues	
Peter Green	1946	2020	England	Electric blues	
Guitar Nubbit	1923	1995	Florida	Electric blues	
Guitar Slim	1926	1959	Louisiana	Louisiana blues	
Buddy Guy	1936		Louisiana	Chicago blues	
Phil Guy	1940	2008	Louisiana	Electric blues	
John P. Hammond	1942	2026	New York	Electric blues	
James Harman	1946	2021	Alabama	Electric blues	
Harmonica Slim	1934	1984	Texas	Texas blues	
Wynonie Harris	1915	1969	Nebraska	Jump blues	
Shakey Jake Harris	1921	1990	Arkansas	Chicago blues	
Little Hatch	1921	2003	Mississippi	Electric blues	
Johnny Heartsman	1936	1996	Texas	Electric blues	
Duke Henderson	1925	1973	Missouri	West Coast blues	
Z. Z. Hill	1935	1984	Texas	Soul blues	
Silas Hogan	1911	1994	Louisiana	Louisiana blues	
Smokey Hogg	1914	1960	Texas	Electric blues	
John Dee Holeman	1929	2021	North Carolina	Piedmont blues	
Earl Hooker	1930	1970	Mississippi	Chicago blues	
John Lee Hooker	1917*	2001	Mississippi	Detroit blues	
Lightnin' Hopkins	1912	1982	Texas	Country blues	
Big Walter Horton	1917*	1981	Mississippi	Chicago blues	
Howlin' Wolf	1910	1976	Mississippi	Chicago blues	
Long John Hunter	1931	2016	Louisiana	Texas blues	
J. B. Hutto	1926	1983	South Carolina	Chicago blues	
John Jackson	1924	2002	Virginia	Piedmont blues	
Elmore James	1918	1963	Mississippi	Chicago blues	
Etta James	1938	2012	California	Soul blues	
Bobo Jenkins	1916	1984	Alabama	Detroit blues	
Jimmy Johnson	1928	2022	Mississippi	Chicago blues	
Luther "Guitar Junior" Johnson	1939	2022	Mississippi	Electric blues	
Luther "Georgia Boy" Johnson	1934	1976	Georgia	Chicago blues	
Floyd Jones	1917	1990*	Arkansas	Electric blues	
Little Sonny Jones	1931	1989	Louisiana	New Orleans blues	
Moody Jones	1908	1988	Arkansas	Chicago blues	
Tail Dragger Jones	1940	2023	Arkansas	Chicago blues	
Louis Jordan	1908	1975	Arkansas	Jump blues	
Kansas City Red	1926	1991	Mississippi	Chicago blues	
Jo Ann Kelly	1944	1990	England	Electric blues	
Junior Kimbrough	1930	1998	Mississippi	Hill country blues	
Albert King	1923	1992	Mississippi	Electric blues	
B.B. King	1925	2015	Mississippi	Electric blues	
Earl King	1934	2003	Louisiana	New Orleans blues	
Eddie King	1938	2012	Alabama	Chicago blues	
Freddie King	1934	1976	Texas	Electric blues	
Little Freddie King	1940		Mississippi	Electric blues	
Bob Kirkpatrick	1934		Louisiana	Texas blues	
Alexis Korner	1928	1984	France	Electric blues	
Sammy Lawhorn	1935	1990	Arkansas	Chicago blues	
Lazy Lester	1933	2018	Louisiana	Swamp blues	
Calvin Leavy	1941*	2010	Arkansas	Soul blues	
Lovie Lee	1908	1997	Mississippi	Chicago blues	
Lefty Dizz	1937	1993	Arkansas	Chicago blues	
J. B. Lenoir	1929	1967	Mississippi	Urban blues	
Lightnin' Slim	1913	1974	Missouri*	Louisiana blues	
Hip Linkchain	1936	1989	Mississippi	Chicago blues	
Little Joe Blue	1934	1990	Mississippi	Electric blues	
Little Sonny	1932*		Alabama	Electric blues	
Little Walter	1930	1968	Louisiana	Chicago blues	
Little Willie Littlefield	1931	2013	Texas	West Coast blues	
John Littlejohn	1931	1994	Mississippi	Chicago blues	
Lonesome Sundown	1928	2005*	Louisiana	Swamp blues	
Louisiana Red	1932	2012	Alabama	Electric blues	
Willie Love	1906	1953	Mississippi	Electric blues	
Magic Sam	1937	1969	Mississippi	Chicago blues	
Magic Slim	1937	2013	Mississippi	Chicago blues	
J.J. Malone	1935	2004	Alabama	West Coast blues	
Johnny Mars	1942	2011	South Carolina	Electric blues	
John Mayall	1933	2024	England	Electric blues	
Pete Mayes	1938	2008	Texas	Texas blues	
Percy Mayfield	1920	1984	Louisiana	West Coast blues	
Earring George Mayweather	1928	1995	Alabama	Chicago blues	
Delbert McClinton	1940		Texas	Electric blues	
Jimmy McCracklin	1921	2012	Texas	West Coast blues	
Brownie McGhee	1915	1996	Tennessee	Piedmont blues	
Memphis Slim	1915	1988	Tennessee	Urban blues	
Big Maceo Merriweather	1905	1953	Georgia	Barrelhouse blues	
Amos Milburn	1927	1980	Texas	Urban blues	
Luke "Long Gone" Miles	1925	1987	Louisiana	Texas blues	
Roy Milton	1907	1983	Oklahoma	Jump blues	
Gatemouth Moore	1913	2004	Kansas	Urban blues	
Johnny B. Moore	1950		Mississippi	Chicago blues	
Muddy Waters	1913	1983	Mississippi	Chicago blues	
Matt "Guitar" Murphy	1929	2018	Mississippi	Chicago blues	
Bobby Murray	1953	2026	California	Electric blues	
Charlie Musselwhite	1944		Mississippi	Electric blues	
Sam Myers	1936	2006	Mississippi	Electric blues	
Robert Nighthawk	1909	1967	Arkansas	Chicago blues	
Andrew Odom	1936	1991	Louisiana	Chicago blues	
Johnny Otis	1921	2012	California	West Coast blues	
Junior Parker	1932	1971	Mississippi	Memphis blues	
Odie Payne	1926	1989	Illinois	Chicago blues	
Dave Peabody	1948		England	Acoustic blues	
Pinetop Perkins	1913	2011	Mississippi	Chicago blues	
Rod Piazza	1947		California	Electric blues	
Dan Pickett	1907	1967	Alabama	Country blues	
Snooky Pryor	1919*	2006	Mississippi	Chicago blues	
Doug Quattlebaum	1927	1996	South Carolina	Piedmont blues	
Bonnie Raitt	1949		California	Electric blues	
Jimmy Reed	1925	1976	Mississippi	Electric blues	
Sonny Rhodes	1940	2021	Texas	Electric blues	
Fenton Robinson	1935	2007*	Mississippi	Electric blues	
Jimmie Lee Robinson	1931	2002	Illinois	Chicago blues	
Sonny Rodgers	1939	1990	Arkansas	Electric blues	
Jimmy Rogers	1924	1997	Mississippi	Chicago blues	
Roomful of Blues			Rhode Island	Electric blues	
Bobby Rush	1933		Louisiana	Soul blues	
Otis Rush	1924	1997	Mississippi	Chicago blues	
Son Seals	1942	2004	Arkansas	Electric blues	
Eddie Shaw	1937	2018	Mississippi	Chicago blues	
Roscoe Shelton	1931	2002	Tennessee	Electric blues	
Johnny Shines	1915	1992	Tennessee	Chicago blues	
Frankie Lee Sims	1917	1970	Louisiana	Texas blues	
Drink Small	1933		South Carolina	Acoustic blues	
Barkin' Bill Smith	1928	2000	Mississippi	Chicago blues	
George "Harmonica" Smith	1924	1983	Arkansas	Electric blues	
Moses "Whispering" Smith	1932	1984	Mississippi	Louisiana blues	
Robert Curtis Smith	1930	2010	Mississippi	Piedmont blues	
Smoky Babe	1927	1975*	Mississippi	Acoustic blues	
Little Smokey Smothers	1939	2010	Mississippi	Chicago blues	
Otis "Big Smokey" Smothers	1929	1993	Mississippi	Chicago blues	
Otis Spann	1930	1970	Mississippi	Chicago blues	
Arthur "Big Boy" Spires	1912	1990	Mississippi	Electric blues	
Arbee Stidham	1917	1988	Arkansas	Electric blues	
Taj Mahal	1942		New York	Acoustic blues	
Baby Tate	1916	1972	Georgia	Piedmont blues	
Eddie Taylor	1923	1985	Mississippi	Chicago blues	
Hound Dog Taylor	1917*	1975	Mississippi	Electric blues	
Koko Taylor	1935*	2009	Tennessee	Electric blues	
Sam Taylor	1916	1990	Tennessee	Urban blues	
Sonny Terry	1911	1986	Georgia	Country blues	
Tabby Thomas	1929	2014	Louisiana	Louisiana blues	
Big Mama Thornton	1926	1984	Alabama	Electric blues	
Luther Tucker	1936	1993	Tennessee	Chicago blues	
Big Joe Turner	1911	1985	Missouri	Jump blues	
Ike Turner	1931	2007	Mississippi	Electric blues	
Titus Turner	1933	1984	Georgia	Soul blues	
Jimmie Vaughan	1951		Texas	Electric blues	
Stevie Ray Vaughan	1954	1990	Texas	Electric blues	
Mose Vinson	1917*	2002	Mississippi	Electric blues	
Johnny "Big Moose" Walker	1927	1999	Mississippi	Chicago blues	
T-Bone Walker	1910	1975	Texas	West Coast blues	
Baby Boy Warren	1919	1977	Louisiana	Detroit blues	
Willie D. Warren	1924	2000	Arkansas	Detroit blues	
Washboard Willie	1909	1991	Alabama	Detroit blues	
Boogie Bill Webb	1924	1990	Mississippi	Electric blues	
Junior Wells	1934	1998	Arkansas	Chicago blues	
Golden "Big" Wheeler	1929	1998	Georgia	Chicago blues	
Lavelle White	1929		Louisiana	Soul blues	
Joe Willie Wilkins	1921	1979	Mississippi	Memphis blues	
Jody Williams	1935	2018	Alabama	Chicago blues	
Johnny Williams	1906	2006	Louisiana	Chicago blues	
Lester Williams	1920	1990	Texas	Texas blues	
Sonny Boy Williamson II	1909*	1965	Mississippi	Chicago blues	
Alan Wilson	1943	1970	Massachusetts	Electric blues	
U.P. Wilson	1934	2004	Louisiana	Texas blues	
Johnny Winter	1944	2014	Texas	Electric blues	
Jimmy Witherspoon	1920	1997	Arkansas	Jump blues	
Big John Wrencher	1924*	1977	Mississippi	Chicago blues	
Billy Wright	1918*	1991	Georgia	Jump blues	
Johnny "Man" Young	1918	1974	Mississippi	Chicago blues	
An asterisk (*) denotes that other sources give different dates, origin, or style.

== Blues since 1980 ==
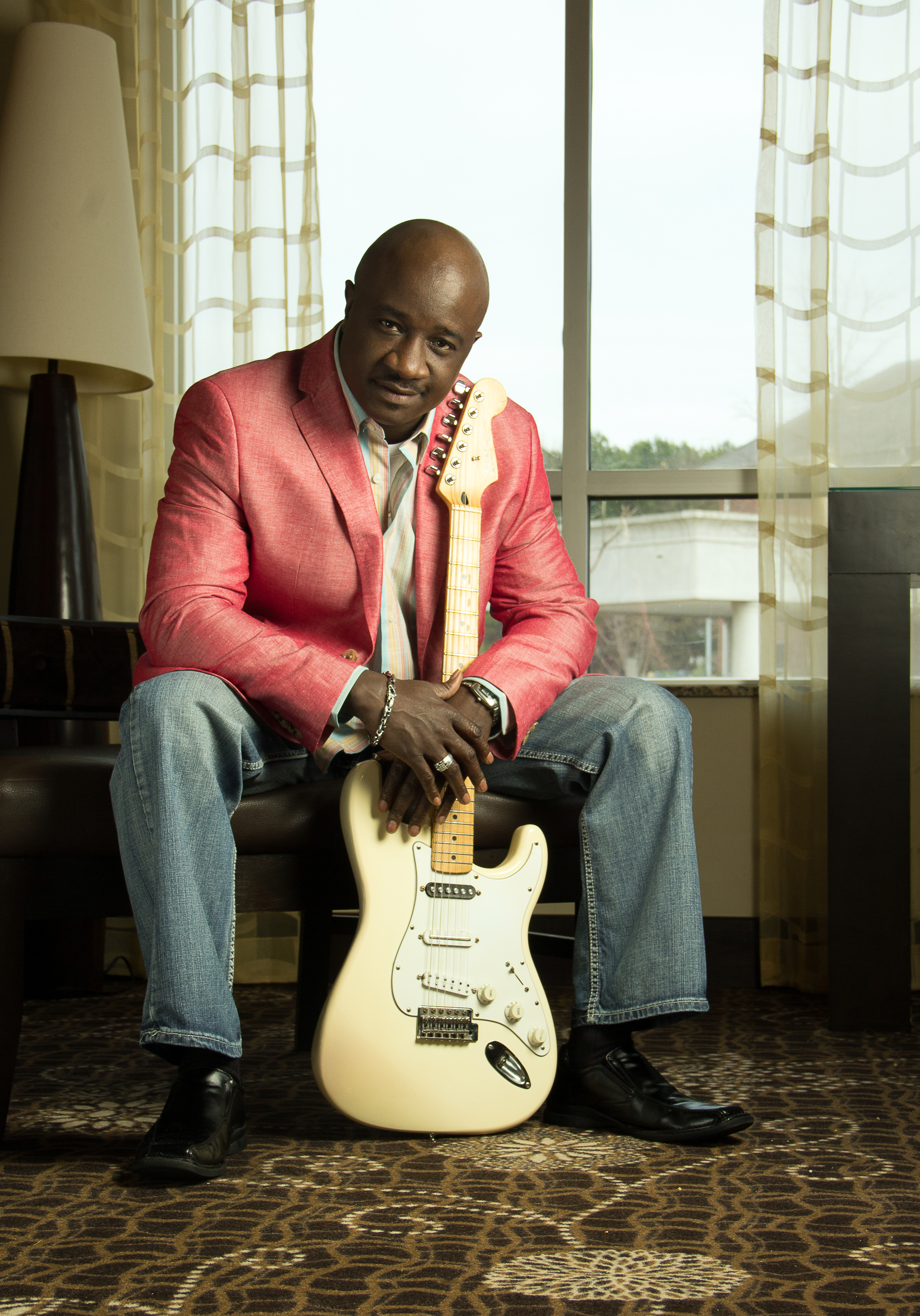
Dexter Allen, 2004

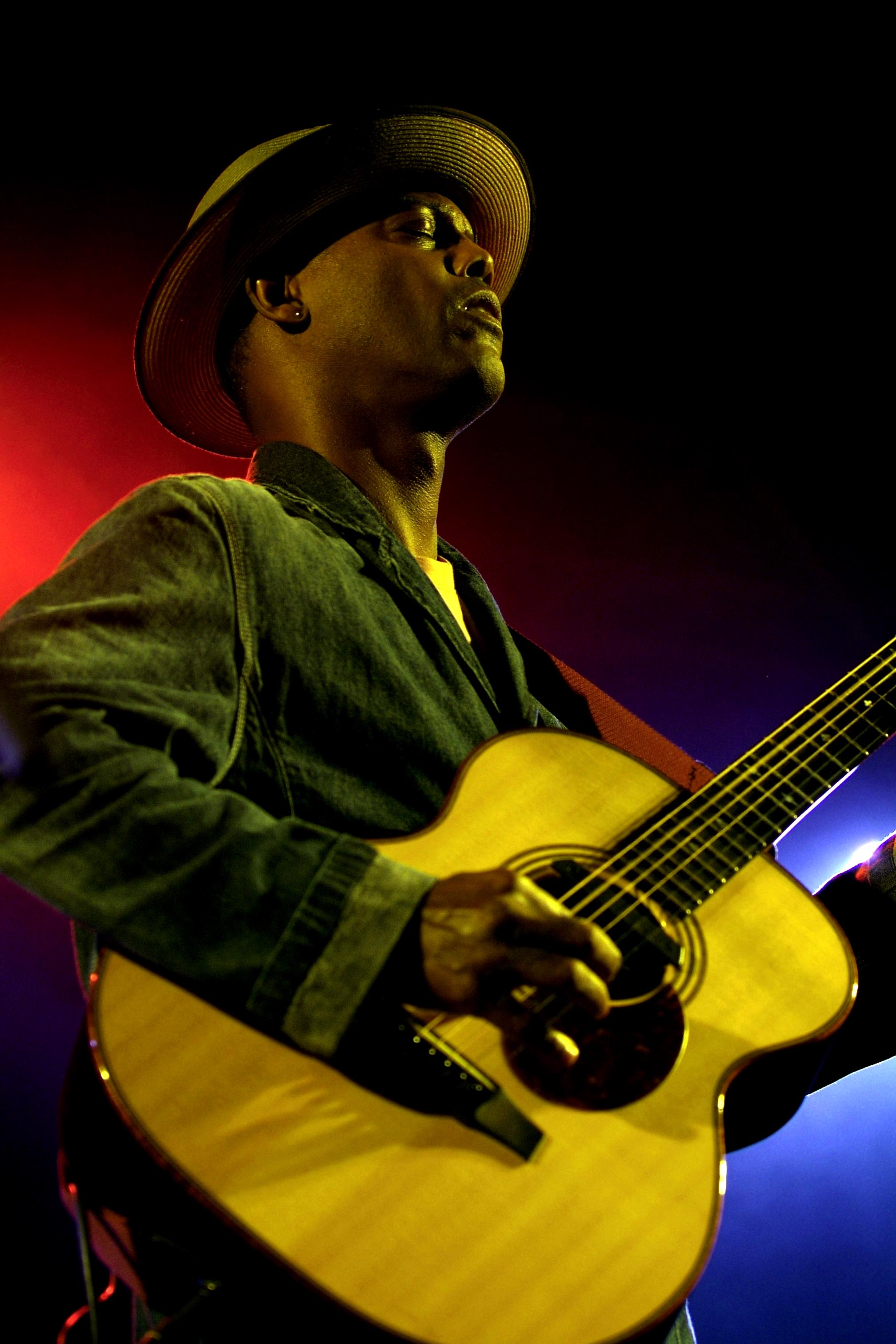
Eric Bibb, 2006

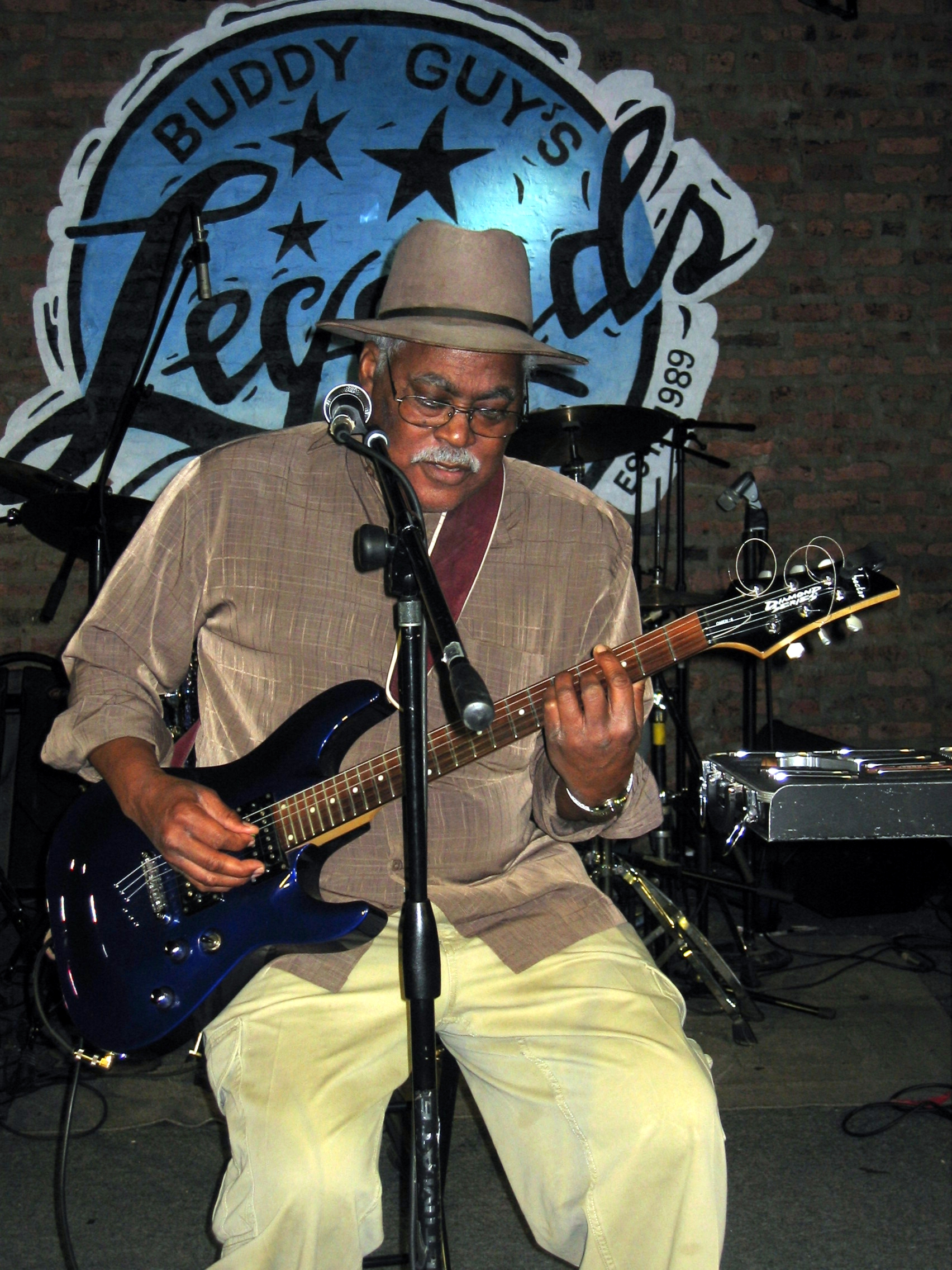
Jimmy Burns, 2012

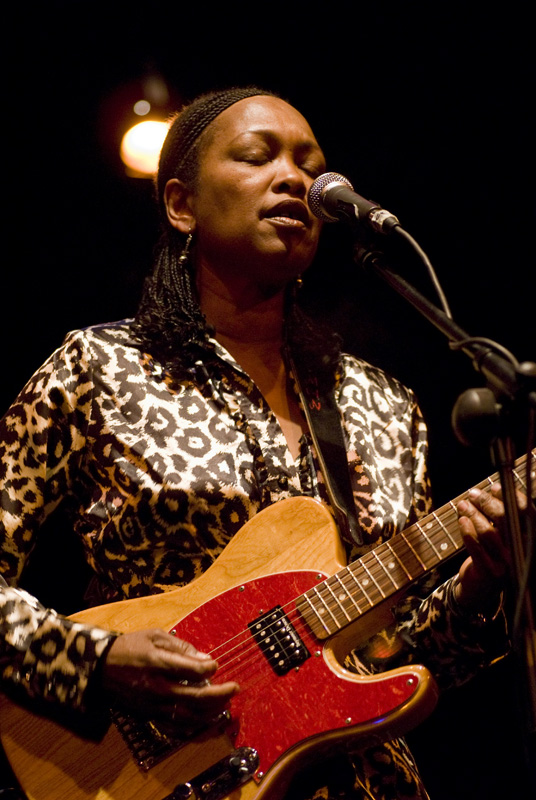
Deborah Coleman, 2009

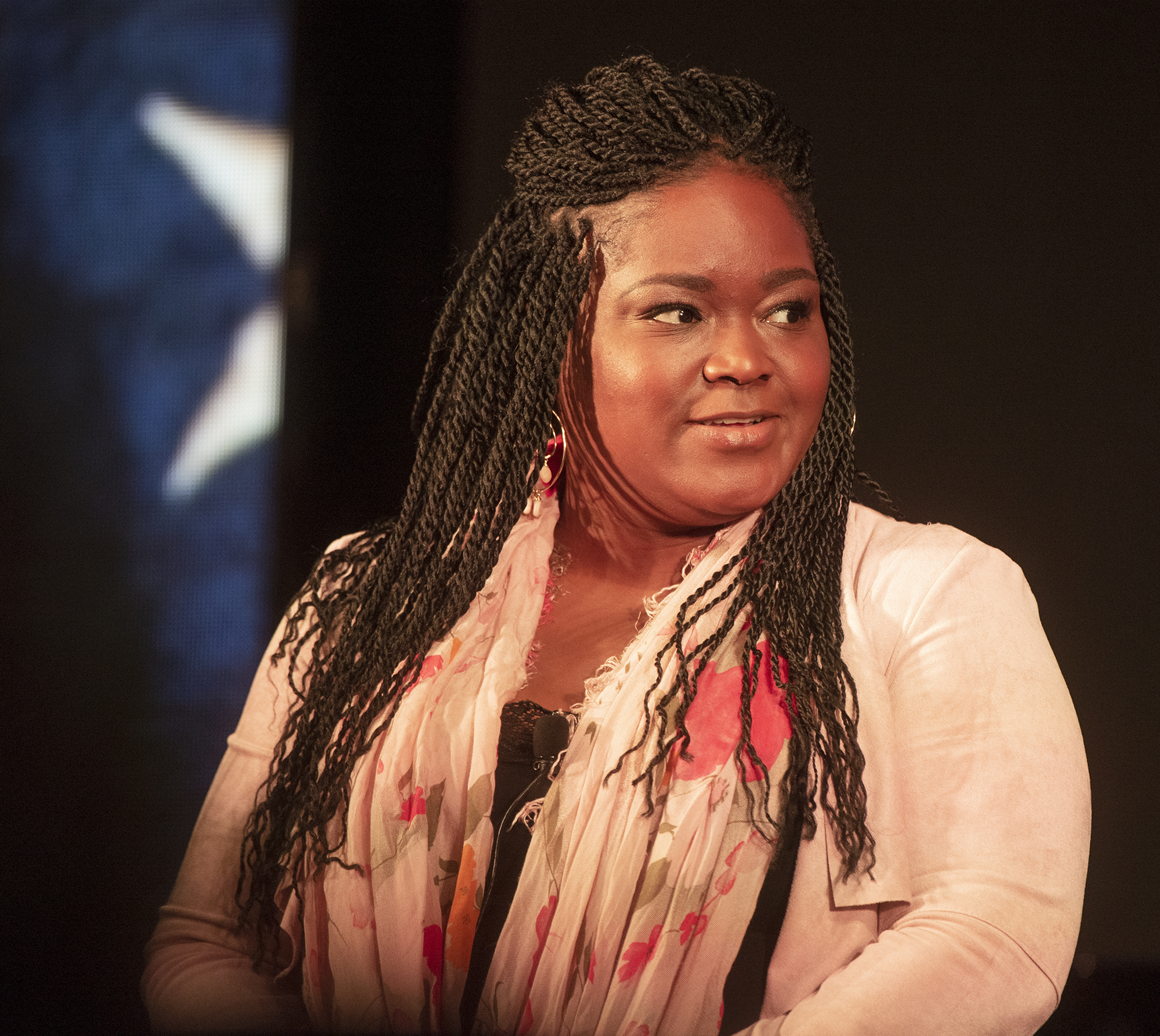
Shemekia Copeland, 2019

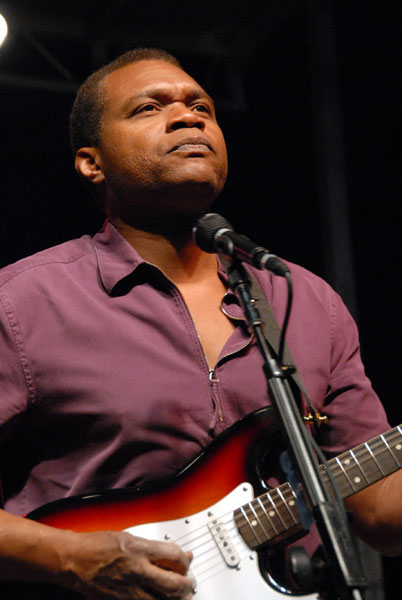
Robert Cray, 2007

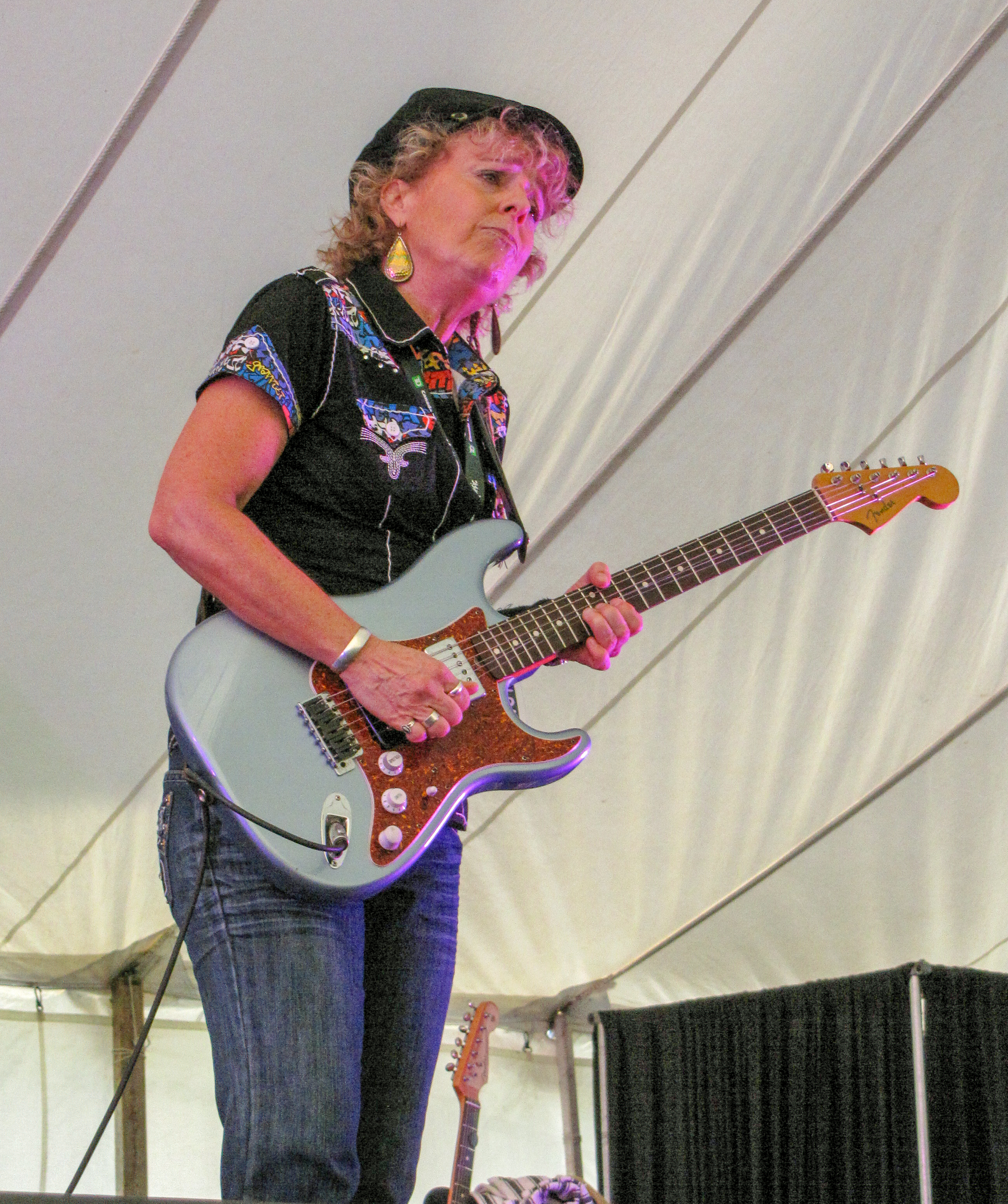
Debbie Davies, 2019

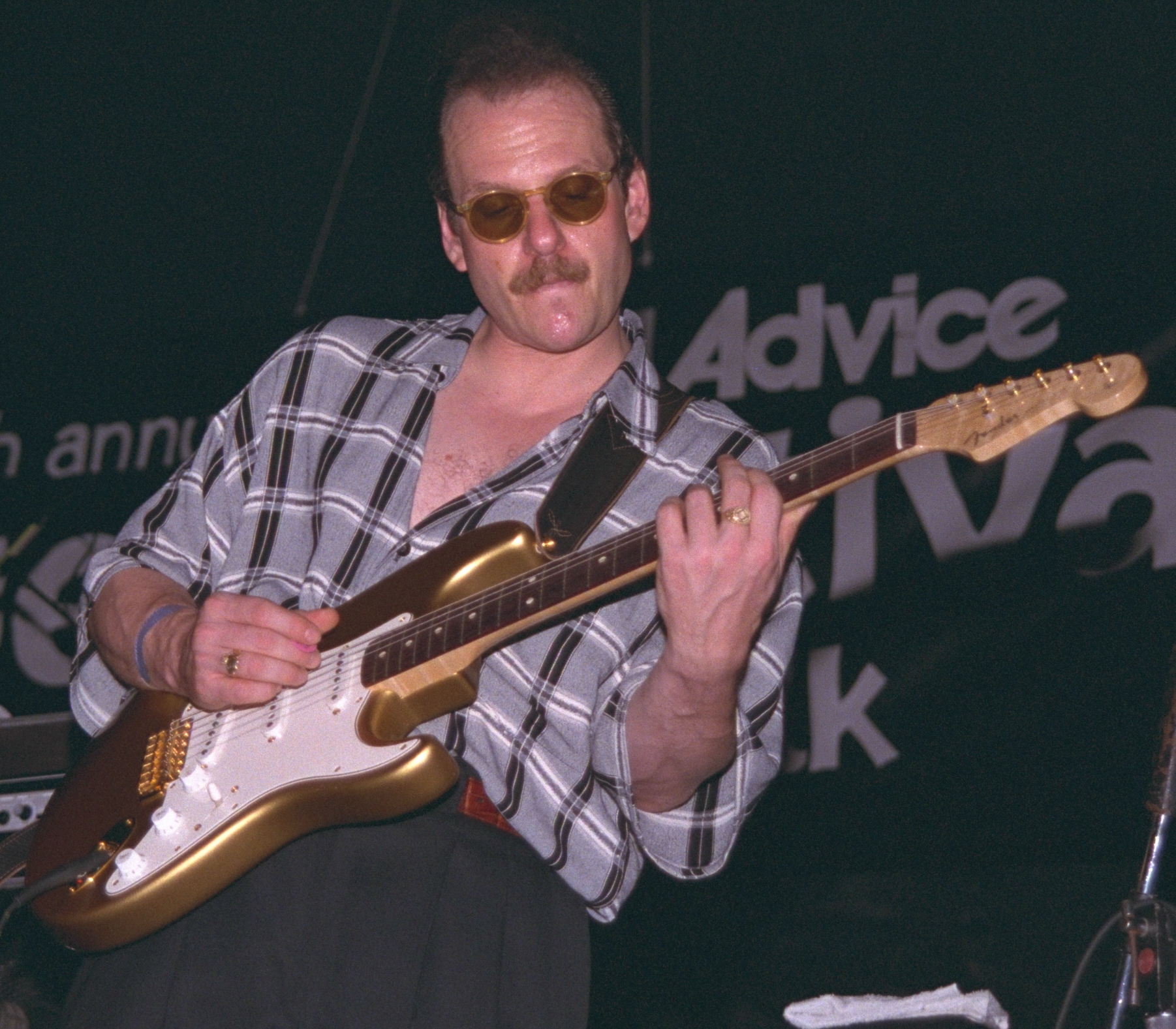
RonnieEarl, 1996

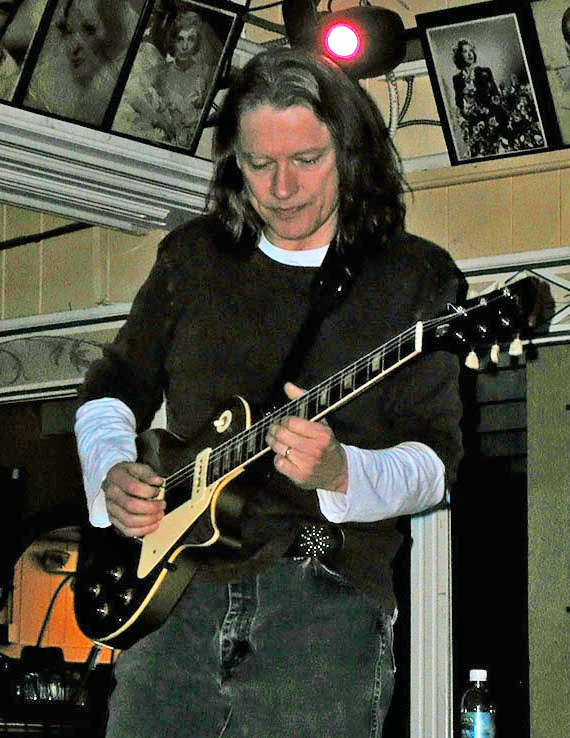
Robben Ford, 2007

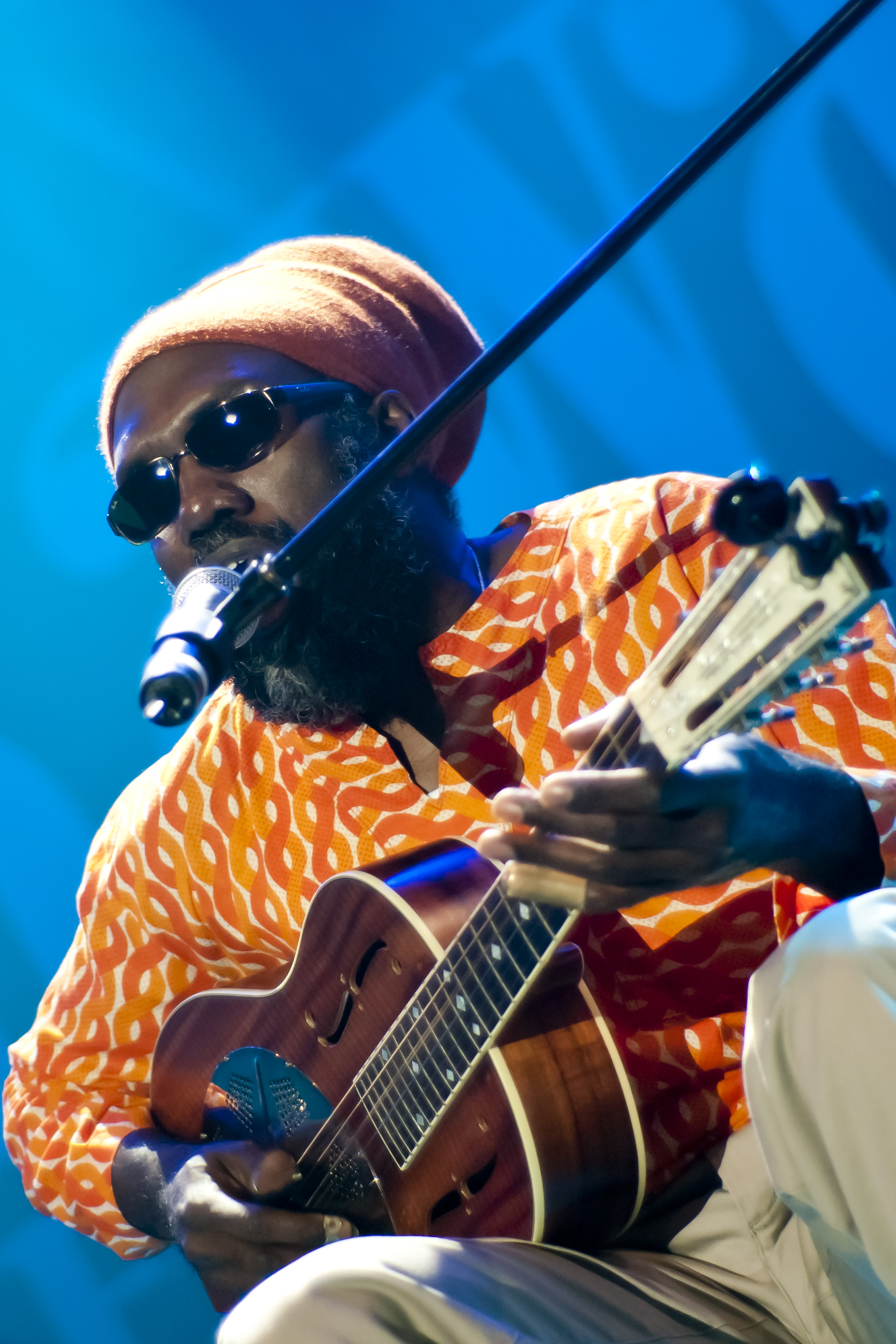
Corey Harris, 2006

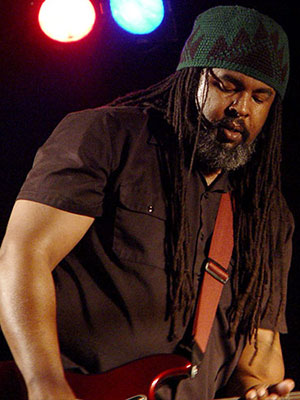
Alvin Youngblood Hart, 2009

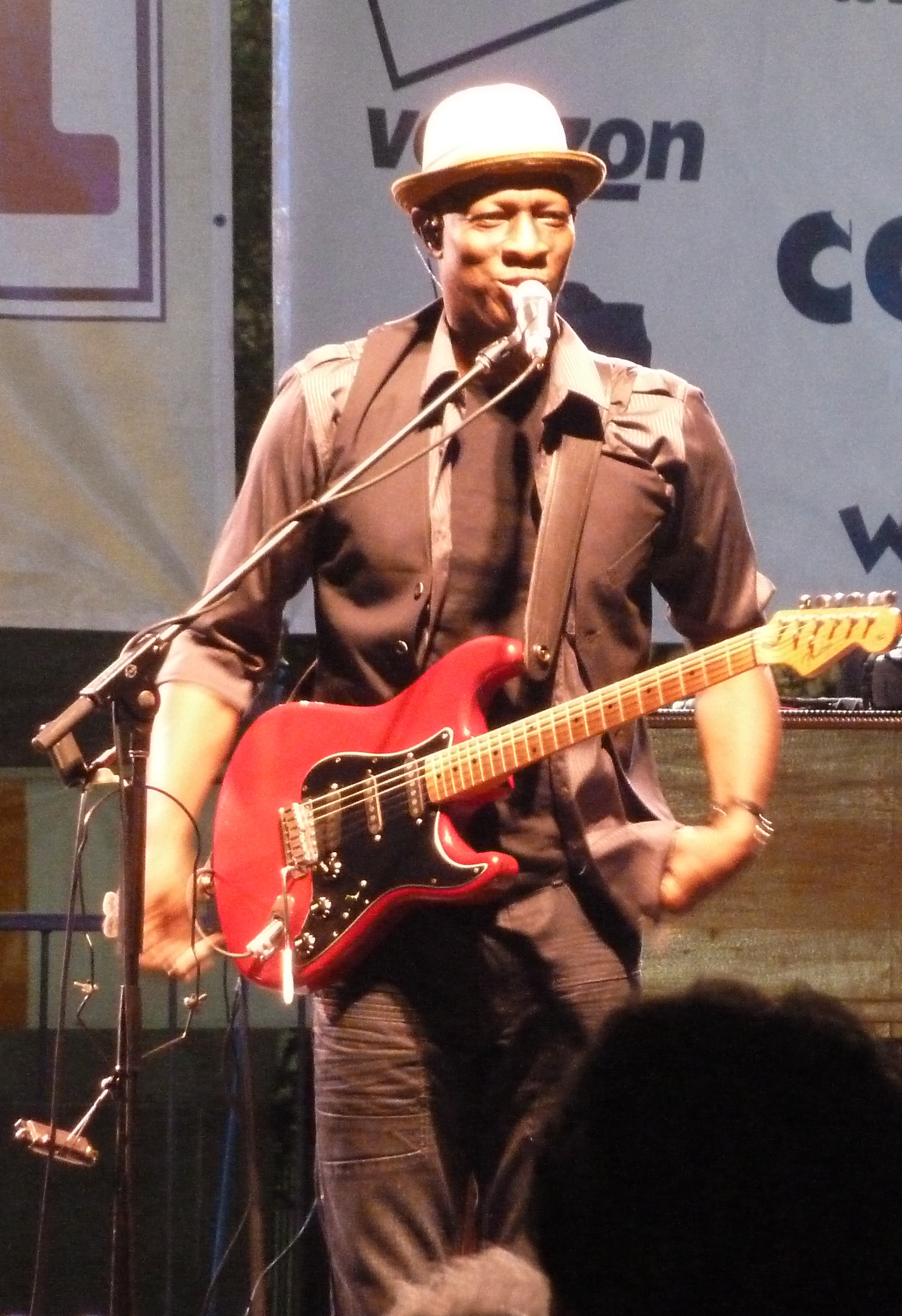
Keb' Mo', 2012

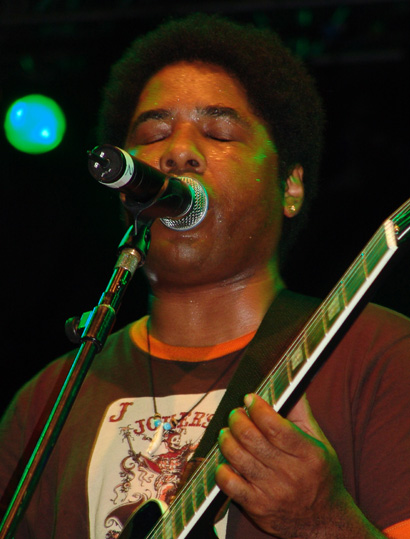
Chris Thomas King, 2005

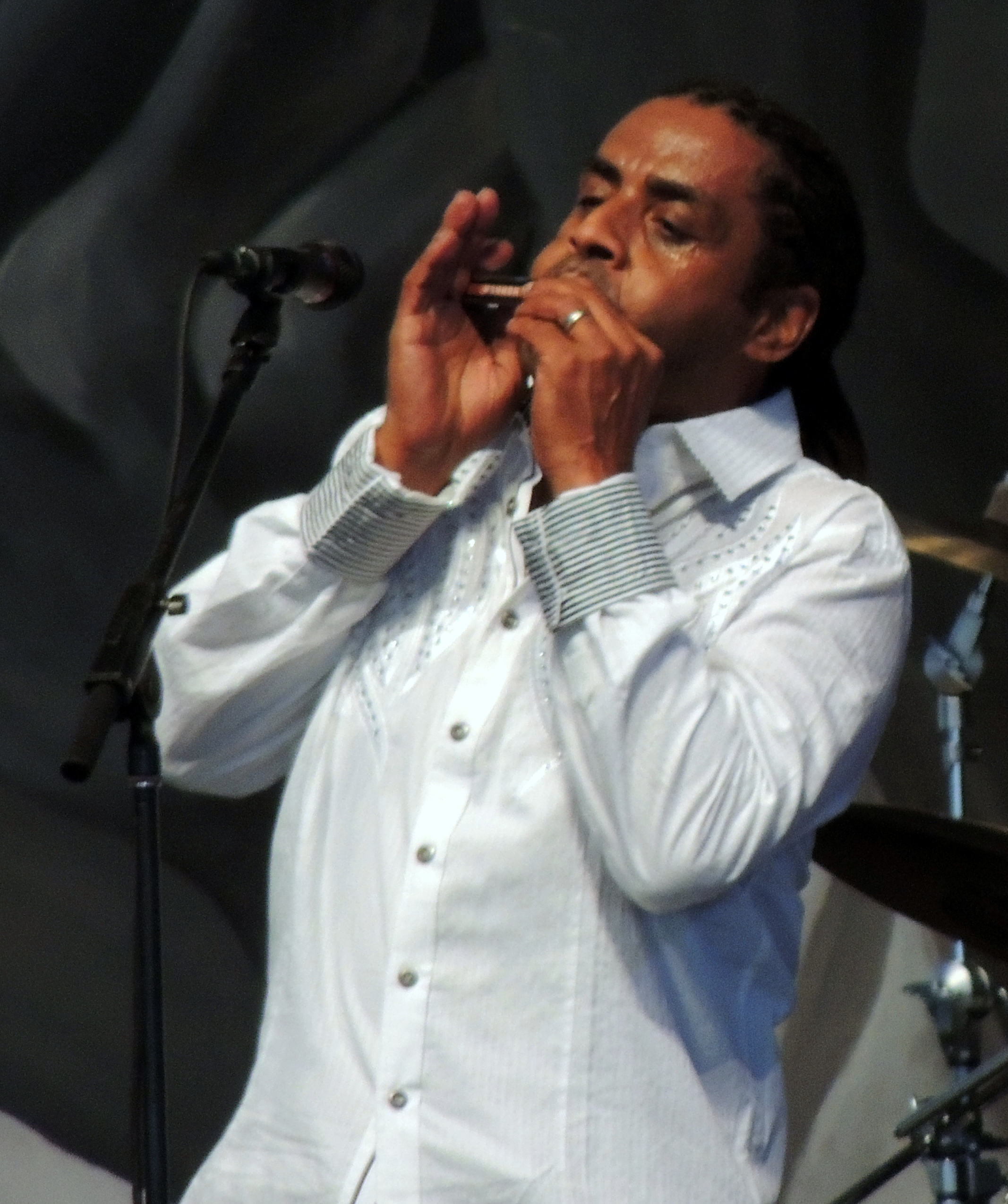
Kenny Neal, 2012

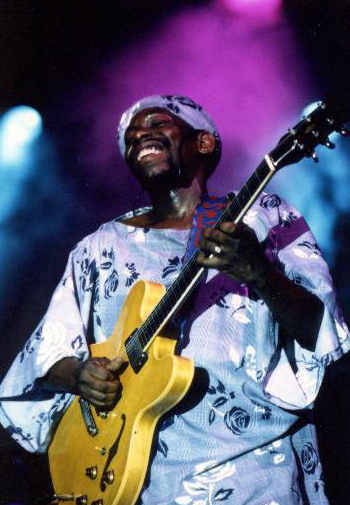
Lucky Peterson

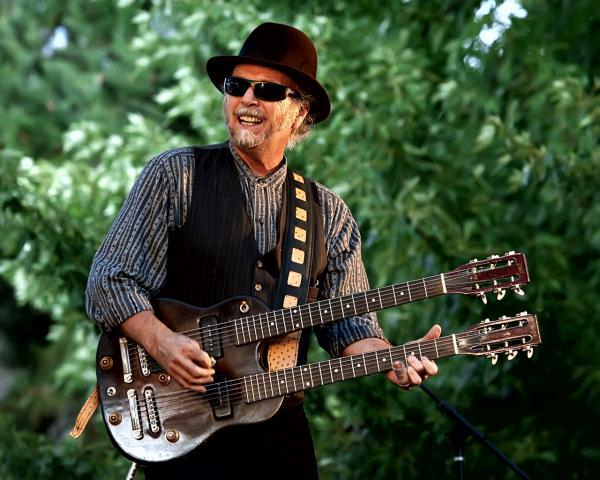
Roy Rogers, 2014

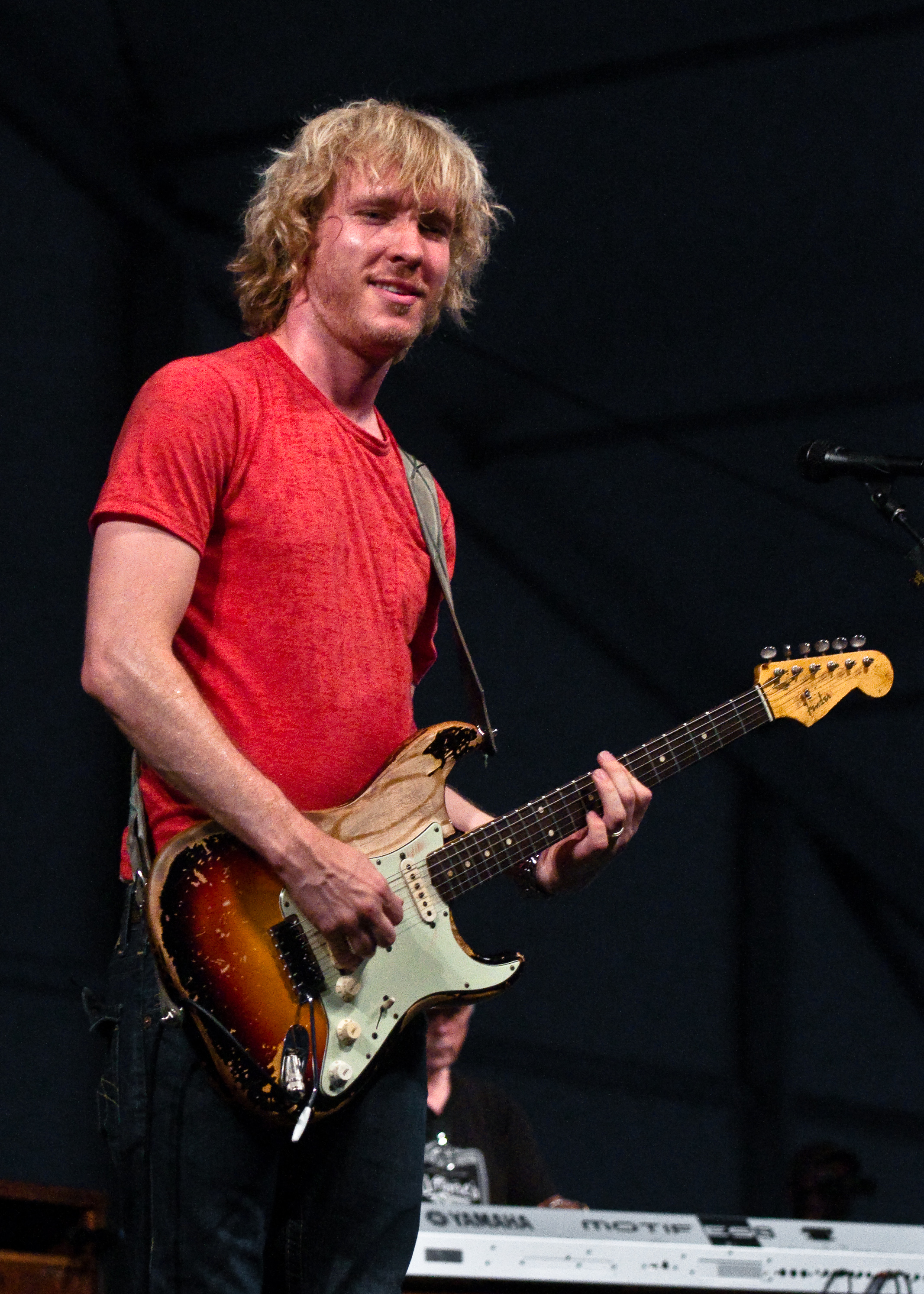
Kenny Wayne Shepherd, 2010

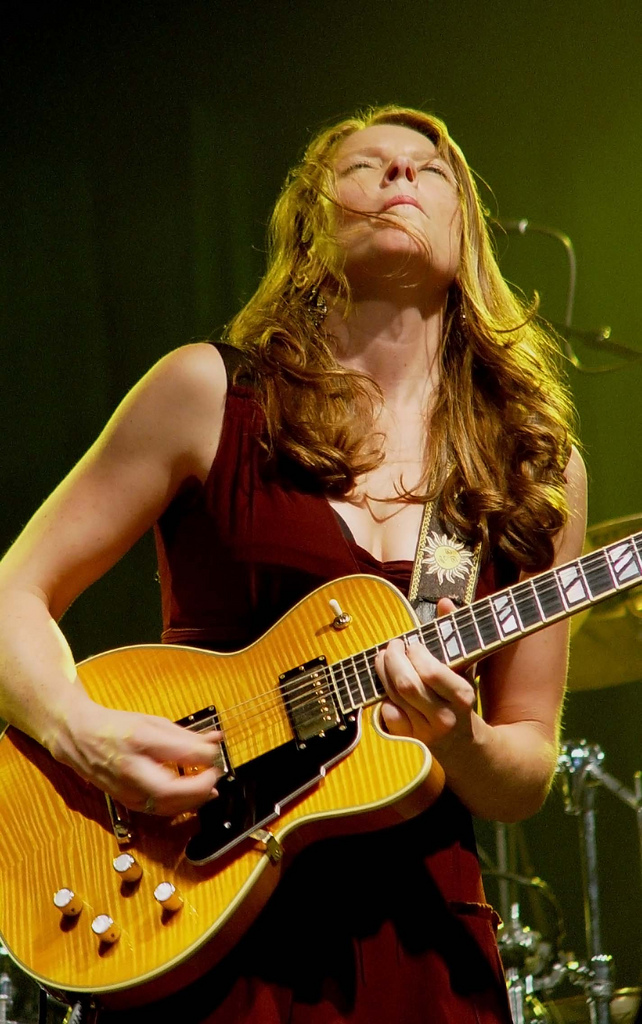
Susan Tedeschi, 2006

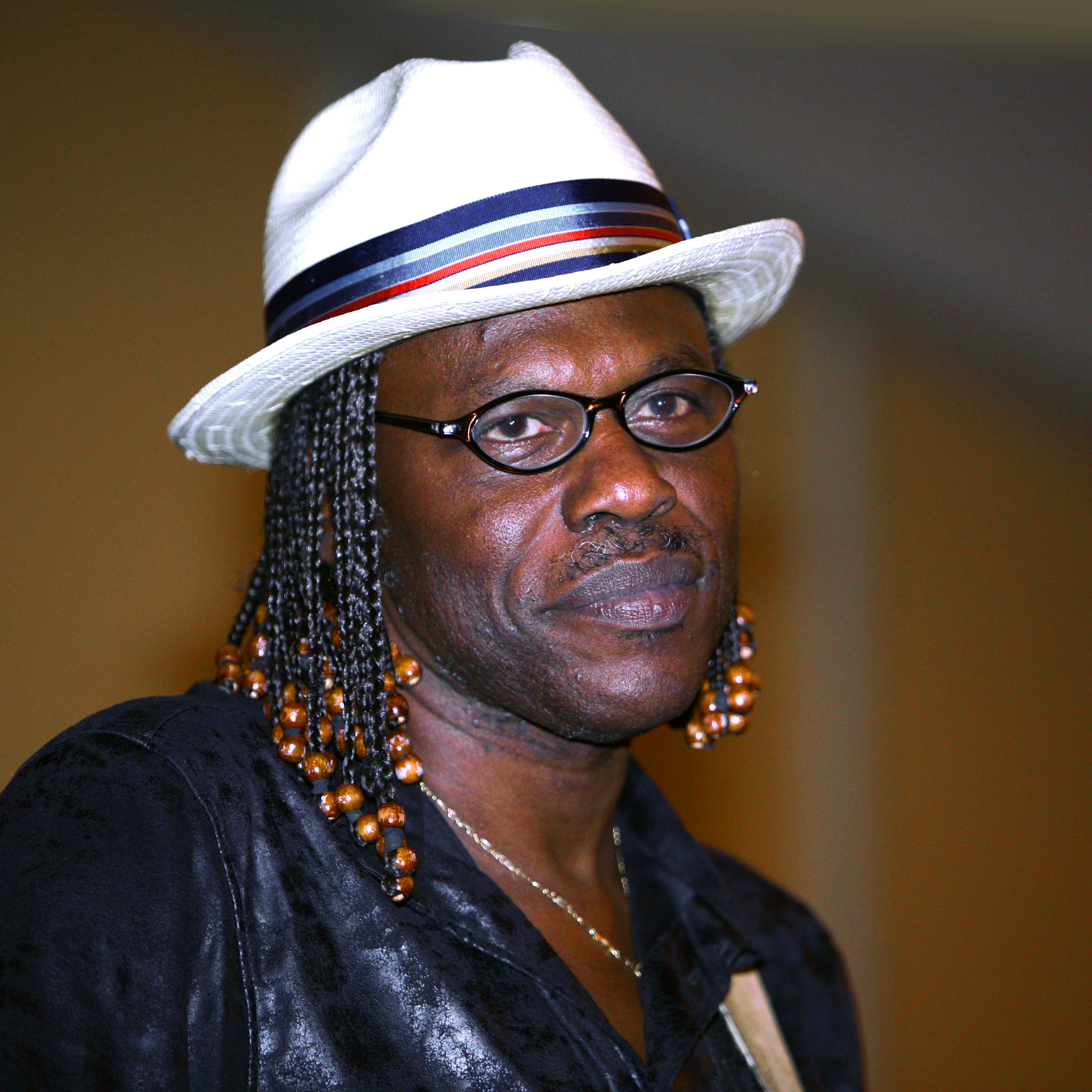
Joe Louis Walker, 2007

List of blues musicians since 1980, showing name, birth and death years, origin, primary style, and references
Name	Birth year	Death year	Origin	Primary style	Ref(s)
Linsey Alexander	1942	2025	Mississippi	Electric blues*	
Laith Al-Saadi	1977		Michigan	Electric blues	
James Armstrong	1957		California	Electric blues	
Dexter Allen	1970		Mississippi	Electric blues*	
Marcia Ball	1949		Texas	Electric blues	
Chico Banks	1962	2008	Illinois	Chicago blues	
L.V. Banks	1932	2011	Missouri	Chicago blues	
Roosevelt "Booba" Barnes	1936	1996	Mississippi	Electric blues	
Barrelhouse Chuck	1958	2016	Ohio	Chicago blues	
Tab Benoit	1967		Louisiana	Electric blues	
Terry "Harmonica" Bean	1961		Mississippi	Electric blues*	
Chris Beard	1957		New York	Electric blues*	
Adolphus Bell	1944		Alabama	Electric blues*	
Lurrie Bell	1958		Illinois	Electric blues	
Eric Bibb	1951		New York	Acoustic blues*	
Blind Mississippi Morris	1955		Mississippi	Electric blues*	
Skeeter Brandon	1948		Virginia	Electric blues*	
Ronnie Baker Brooks	1967		Illinois	Electric blues*	
Jimmy Burns	1943		Mississippi	Electric blues*	
Cedric Burnside	1978		Mississippi	Electric blues*	
Charles Caldwell	1943	2003	Mississippi	Electric blues*	
Karen Carroll	1958		Illinois	Electric blues	
William Clarke	1951	1996	California	Electric blues	
Deborah Coleman	1956	2018	Virginia	Electric blues	
Shemekia Copeland	1979		New York	Electric blues*	
Robert Cray	1953		Georgia	Electric blues	
Debbie Davies	1952		California	Electric blues	
Boo Boo Davis	1943		Mississippi	Electric blues*	
Guy Davis	1952		New York	Electric blues	
Thornetta Davis	1963		Michigan	Electric blues*	
Little Arthur Duncan	1934	2008	Mississippi	Electric blues*	
Ronnie Earl	1953		New York	Electric blues	
Tinsley Ellis	1957		Georgia	Electric blues	
Kirk Fletcher	1975		California	Electric blues*	
Sue Foley	1968		Canada	Electric blues	
Robben Ford	1951		California	Electric blues	
Rick Franklin	1941	2005	Virginia	Electric blues*	
Anson Funderburgh	1954		Texas	Electric blues	
Grady Gaines	1934	2021	Texas	Electric blues	
Terry Garland	1953		Tennessee	Country blues	
Larry Garner	1952		Louisiana	Electric blues*	
Otis Grand	1950	2023	U.S.	Electric blues	
Guitar Slim Jr.	1951		Louisiana	Electric blues	
Sandra Hall	1951		Georgia	Electric blues*	
Larry Hamilton	1951	2011	Texas	Electric blues	
Odessa Harris	1936	2003	Arkansas	Electric blues*	
Alvin Youngblood Hart	1963		California	Acoustic blues*	
Ted Hawkins	1936	1995	Mississippi	Acoustic blues	
Big Boy Henry	1921	2004	North Carolina	Electric blues*	
George Higgs	1930	2013	North Carolina	Electric blues*	
Fruteland Jackson	1953		Mississippi	Electric blues*	
Colin James	1964		Canada	Electric blues	
Steve James	1950	2023	New York	Acoustic blues	
L.V. Johnson	1946		U.S.	Electric blues	
Johnny "Yard Dog" Jones	1941		Illinois	Electric blues*	
Paul "Wine" Jones	1946	2005	Mississippi	Electric blues*	
Tutu Jones	1957		Texas	Electric blues*	
Keb' Mo'	1955		California	Acoustic blues	
Harrison Kennedy	1942		Canada	Electric blues*	
Chris Thomas King	1962		Louisiana	Electric blues*	
Little Jimmy King	1968	2002	Tennessee	Electric blues	
Lady Bianca	1953		Kansas	Electric blues	
Johnny Laws	1943	2021	Illinois	Electric blues*	
Professor Eddie Lusk	1948	1992	Illinois	Electric blues*	
Bob Margolin	1949		Massachusetts	Electric blues	
Johnnie Marshall	1961		Georgia	Electric blues*	
Larry McCray	1962		Arkansas	Electric blues	
Clara McDaniel	1948		Michigan	Electric blues*	
Johnny B. Moore	1952		U.S.	Chicago blues	
Kenny Neal	1957		Louisiana	Electric blues	
Jay Owens	1947		Florida	Electric blues	
Sista Monica Parker	1956		Indiana	Electric blues*	
Neal Pattman	1927	2005	Georgia	Electric blues*	
Asie Payton	1937	1997	Mississippi	Electric blues*	
Lucky Peterson	1964		New York	Electric blues	
Kelly Joe Phelps	1960		Washington	Electric blues*	
Lonnie Pitchford	1955		Kentucky	Electric blues*	
Gene "Birdlegg" Pittman	1947		Pennsylvania	Electric blues*	
Gary Primich	1958		Illinois	Electric blues	
Henry Qualls	1934	2003	Texas	Acoustic blues*	
Johnny Rawls	1951		Mississippi	Electric blues	
Sherman Robertson	1948		Louisiana	Electric blues	
Duke Robillard	1948		Rhode Island	Electric blues	
Andy Rodgers	1922	2004	Mississippi	Acoustic blues*	
Mighty Mo Rodgers	1942		Illinois	Electric blues*	
Roy Rogers	1950		California	Electric blues*	
Saffire – The Uppity Blues Women				Acoustic blues	
Isaac Scott	1945	2001	Washington	Electric blues*	
Kenny Wayne Shepherd	1977		Louisiana	Electric blues	
Lonnie Shields	1956		Arkansas	Electric blues*	
Cootie Stark	1926	2005	South Carolina	Acoustic blues	
Angela Strehli	1945		Texas	Electric blues	
Demetria Taylor	1973		Illinois	Chicago blues	
Eddie Taylor Jr.	1972		Illinois	Electric blues*	
Melvin Taylor	1959		Mississippi	Electric blues	
Otis Taylor	1948		Illinois	Electric blues*	
Susan Tedeschi	1970		Massachusetts	Electric blues	
Lil' Dave Thompson	1969	2010	Mississippi	Electric blues*	
Pyeng Threadgill	1977		New York	Electric blues*	
Teeny Tucker	1958		Ohio	Electric blues*	
Maurice John Vaughn	1952		Illinois	Chicago blues	
Joe Louis Walker	1949	2025	California	Electric blues	
Carl Weathersby	1953	2024	Mississippi	Electric blues	
Valerie Wellington	1959	1991	Illinois	Electric blues	
Mike Wheeler	1961		Illinois	Electric blues*	
Albert White	1942		Georgia	Electric blues*	
Lil' Ed Williams	1955		U.S.	Chicago blues	
Zora Young	1948		Mississippi	Electric blues	
An asterisk (*) denotes that other sources give different dates, origin, or style.

== See also ==
- List of nicknames of blues musicians
- Lists of blues musicians by genre
