= Sweet Dreams: The Anthology =

Compilation album by Roy Buchanan
- Released: September 22, 1992
- Recorded: 1969–78
- Genre: Blues
- Label: Polydor (#D201160)

Roy Buchanan chronology
| Early Years (1989) | Sweet Dreams: The Anthology (1992) | Guitar on Fire: The Atlantic Sessions (1993) |

Sweet Dreams: The Anthology is a compilation album by American guitarist and blues musician Roy Buchanan. The double CD contains released as well as previously unreleased recordings, live and studio. According to Mike Joyce, who reviewed the album in The Washington Post, it "presents the good, the bad and the unreleased from Buchanan's tenure with the Polydor and Atlantic labels." The anthology is part of PolyGram's "Chronicles" retrospective series.

== Track listing ==
All tracks composed by Roy Buchanan; except where indicated

- Disc one

| No. | Title | Writer(s) | Length |
|---|---|---|---|
| 1. | "Baltimore" | Charlie Daniels | 3:31 |
| 2. | "Black Autumn" | Charlie Daniels | 4:25 |
| 3. | "The Story of Isaac" | Leonard Cohen | 5:48 |
| 4. | "There'll Always Be" | Charlie Daniels | 4:50 |
| 5. | "Sweet Dreams" | Don Gibson | 3:32 |
| 6. | "Pete's Blues" | | 7:15 |
| 7. | "The Messiah Will Come Again" | | 5:53 |
| 8. | "Tribute to Elmore James" | | 3:25 |
| 9. | "After Hours" | Avery Parrish, Buddy Feyne, Robert Bruce | 6:14 |
| 10. | "Five String Blues" | | 6:24 |
| 11. | "C.C. Rider (live)" | Traditional | 6:49 |
| 12. | "My Baby Says She's Gonna Leave Me" | Buchanan, John Harrison, Billy Price | 3:21 |
| 13. | "Please Don't Turn Me Away" | Buchanan, Billy Price | 4:47 |
| 14. | "Country Preacher" | Joe Zawinul | 3:28 |
| 15. | "Wayfaring Pilgrim" | Buchanan, Ed Freeman | 5:07 |

- Disc two

| No. | Title | Writer(s) | Length |
|---|---|---|---|
| 1. | "Down by the River (live)" | Neil Young | 9:17 |
| 2. | "I'm a Ram (live)" | Al Green, Mabon "Teenie" Hodges | 4:24 |
| 3. | "I'm Evil (live)" | | 6:15 |
| 4. | "Good God Have Mercy" | Billy Roberts | 4:05 |
| 5. | "If Six Was Nine" | Jimi Hendrix | 3:46 |
| 6. | "Green Onions" | Steve Cropper, Al Jackson Jr., Booker T. Jones, Lewie Steinberg | 8:09 |
| 7. | "Soul Dressing (live)" | Booker T. Jones | 7:00 |
| 8. | "Hey Joe (live)" | Billy Roberts | 8:19 |
| 9. | "Fly...Night Bird" | Buchanan, Andy Newmark, Jean Roussel, Raymond Silva, Willie Weeks | 7:42 |
| 10. | "Turn To Stone" | Terry Trebandt, Joe Walsh | 5:46 |
| 11. | "Dual Soliloquy" | | 12:06 |

- Tracks 1.01 to 1.04 outtakes from unreleased debut album, recorded between 1969 and 71 (vocals on "The Story of Isaac" by Charlie Daniels)
- Tracks 1.05 to 1.07 from the album Roy Buchanan
- Tracks 1.08 to 1.10 from the album Second Album
- Tracks 1.12 & 1.13 from the album That's What I am Here For
- Tracks 1.14 & 1.15 from the album Rescue Me / In The Beginning
- Tracks 2.02 & 2.03 from the album Live Stock
- Tracks 2.04 & 2.05 from the album A Street Called Straight
- Track 2.06 from the album Loading Zone
- Tracks 2.07 & 2.08 from the album Live in Japan
- Tracks 2.09 & 2.10 from the album You're Not Alone
- Tracks 1.11, 2.01 & 2.11 previously unreleased, mixed at PolyGram Studios

== Critical reception ==
Professional ratings
Review scores
| Source | Rating |
|---|---|
| Allmusic | 4.5/5 stars |

Lindsay Planer, in a review on Allmusic, writes in a review that gives the album 4.5 out of 5 stars, "until Buchanan's catalog is given a thorough overhaul, Sweet Dreams: The Anthology (1992) is a satisfying overview of the man once dubbed 'The Best Unknown Guitarist in the World.'" Mike Joyce of the Washington Post was most impressed with "a gorgeous guitar reading of 'Sweet Dreams,'" besides the live songs, especially "an expansive and expressive version of Neil Young's 'Down by the River' (featuring Billy Price on vocals)."
