= Joe Weaver =

American Detroit blues, electric blues and R&B pianist, singer and bandleader

- Born: Joseph Weaver; August 27, 1934; Detroit, Michigan, United States
- Died: July 5, 2006 (aged 71) Southfield, Michigan, United States
- Genres: Detroit blues, R&B, electric blues
- Occupations: Pianist, singer, bandleader, songwriter
- Instruments: Piano, vocals
- Years active: 1952–1966; 1999–2006
- Label: Various

Joe Weaver (August 27, 1934 – July 5, 2006) was an American Detroit blues, electric blues and R&B pianist, singer and bandleader. His best known recording was "Baby I Love You So" (1955), and he was a founding member of both the Blue Note Orchestra and the Motor City Rhythm & Blues Pioneers. Over his lengthy but staggered career, Weaver worked with various musicians including the Four Tops, Marvin Gaye, John Lee Hooker, Nathaniel Mayer, the Miracles, Martha Reeves, Nolan Strong & the Diablos, Andre Williams, Nancy Wilson, and Stevie Wonder. In addition, Weaver was a session musician in the early days of Motown Records and played in the house band at Fortune Records. He was a key figure in the 1950s Detroit R&B scene.

== Biography ==
Weaver was born in Detroit, Michigan. He learned to play the piano from the age of nine. While at Northwestern High School he teamed up with another student, Johnnie Bassett, to form Joe Weaver and the Blue Notes. They played jump blues and jazz numbers in the early 1950s, and won numerous talent contests, including several at the Warfield Theater in Hastings Street. This led to becoming the house band there, backing both Little Willie John and John Lee Hooker. In 1953, Joe Von Battle, owner of JVB Records recorded their instrumental "1540 Special", which Was eventually released by De Luxe Records. Weaver and his band later became session musicians for Fortune Records. During this time they provided accompaniment to Nolan Strong & the Diablos and Andre Williams. Their debut album, A Fortune of Blues (1954), was credited to Joe Weaver & His Blue Note Orchestra. The album Baby I Love You So was issued the following year. Neither release was a commercial success, but they brought Weaver to the attention of Berry Gordy Jr. They played on early Tamla recordings, notably the Miracles' million-selling "Shop Around". Their tenure there was short-lived, but Blue Note Orchestra members James Jamerson, Eddie Willis, and Benny Benjamin later were among Motown's in-house backing musicians, the Funk Brothers.

Weaver did not earn the recognition afforded to some of his associates, and he quit the music industry in the mid-1960s to look after his young daughters. He worked on a production line at the Ford Motor Company in Detroit for almost thirty years. He retired from Ford in 1999 and again teamed with Bassett to re-create the Blue Note Orchestra. The ensemble recorded the album Baby I Love You So (2000), released by the Dutch label Black Magic. It is not to be confused with his 1955 single and album releases of the same title.

In 2002, Weaver recorded with fellow Detroit veterans Stanley Mitchell and Kenny Martin, billed as the Motor City Rhythm & Blues Pioneers. The resultant self-titled album was released by Blue Suit Records. At the 2003 Great Lakes Folk Festival, Weaver performed as part of the Detroit Blues Revue with Johnnie Bassett and Alberta Adams. In May 2006, Weaver was granted a Distinguished Achievement Award at the Detroit Music Awards.

Weaver died of complications following a stroke on July 5, 2006, in Southfield, Michigan, at the age of 71.

== Discography ==
- Baby I Love You So (2000), Black Magic
- Motor City Rhythm & Blues Pioneers (2002), Blue Suit

== See also ==
- List of Detroit blues musicians
