= John Harrison (director) =

American film director and producer (born 1948)

- Born: John S. Harrison Jr. 1948 (age 77–78); Pittsburgh, Pennsylvania, U.S.
- Education: Emerson College (B.S.); Carnegie Mellon University (MFA)
- Occupations: Director; writer; producer; composer; actor
- Years active: 1973–present
- Website: officialjohnharrison.com

John S. Harrison Jr. (born 1948) is an American television and film director, screenwriter, musician, composer and actor. He is best known for his collaborations with filmmaker George A. Romero, and for writing and directing the 2000 television miniseries adaptation of Dune.

== Early years ==
John S. Harrison Jr. was born and raised in Pittsburgh, Pennsylvania. He graduated from Emerson College in Boston with a BS in Theater Arts and is an MFA graduate of Carnegie Mellon University's School of Drama. For several years after that, he performed on the road with his band Homebrew before moving back to Pittsburgh to take a master's degree in film and television from Carnegie Mellon University.

At the same time, he joined blues guitarist Roy Buchanan, with whom he toured across the US and internationally for four years. He was also featured on several of Buchanan's albums, including That's What I'm Here For (1974), Live Stock (1975), and A Street Called Straight (1976).

== Career ==
In 1973, Harrison and his friends, Dusty Nelson and Pasquale Buba, formed a film production company eventually named The Image Works to produce commercials and industrials in the Pittsburgh area. This partnership eventually led to the production of the film Effects (1980), which Harrison produced and performed in as the character Lacey Bickel. In 1974, Harrison began a long collaboration and friendship with filmmaker George A. Romero. Harrison performed as Sir Pelinore in Romero's Knightriders, then became his 1st Assistant Director for both Romero films Creepshow (1982) and Day of the Dead (1985).

Harrison also composed the scores for Creepshow and Day of the Dead (1985). He also played the "Screwdriver Zombie" in Romero's classic Dawn of the Dead (1978). The music that was composed for the score of Creepshow was also featured in the fake trailer for Thanksgiving in the film Grindhouse (2007), and the South Park episode "Tegridy Farms Halloween Special" (2019). Music from Harrison's Day of the Dead score was also featured in the premiere Stranger Things Season 3, "Suzie, Do You Copy" (2019).

After Creepshow, Harrison moved to Los Angeles to continue his writing and directing career. He wrote, directed and composed the music for multiple episodes of the Tales from the Darkside TV show. He was then tapped by producer Richard P. Rubinstein to direct Tales from the Darkside: The Movie (1990) for Paramount, which won the Gran Prix du Festival at Avoriaz, France (1991). Harrison's collaboration with Rubinstein culminated in the Emmy-winning TV miniseries, Frank Herbert's Dune (2000), which Harrison wrote and directed, and Frank Herbert's Children of Dune (2003), which Harrison wrote and executive produced.

In 2001, Harrison receives a co-song writing credit, for the Gorillaz's track "M1 A1", from the album Gorillaz, which samples music (along with dialogue), from the film Day of the Dead. Gorillaz used samples from the same film for another song, "Hip Albatross", a B-side on the international hit "19-2000".

In 2006, Harrison reunited with mentor Romero to co-produce Romero's film Diary of the Dead (2007). His action suspense thriller Blank Slate for producer Dean Devlin, which Harrison wrote and directed, aired as a twenty episode mini-series on TNT in the fall of 2008. In 2009, Harrison completed his adaptation of acclaimed horror novelist Clive Barker's Book of Blood, which Harrison co-wrote and directed.

His paranormal thriller miniseries Residue (2015), which he created and wrote, was released on Netflix in April 2015.

Harrison has written and directed episodes of Creepshow on Shudder.

He has also written the novels. Destiny Gardens which was published in 2013, Passing Through Veils, published in 2023 and Residue, Paramentals Rising which was published in 2025. His latest novel, Did You Get the Package?, was published in October, 2026.

== Filmography ==
=== Film ===
| Year | Title | Functioned as | | | | | Notes |
| Year | Title | Director | Writer | Executive producer | Composer | Actor | Notes |
|---|---|---|---|---|---|---|---|
| 1978 | Dawn of the Dead | | | | | Uncredited | Role; as Screwdriver Zombie |
| 1979 | Effects | | | Yes | Yes | Yes | Role; as Lacey Bickel |
| 1981 | Knightriders | | | | | Yes | Role; as Pellinore |
| 1982 | Creepshow | | | | Yes | | Also first assistant director |
| 1985 | Day of the Dead | | | | Yes | | Also first assistant director |
| 1988 | Jack's Back | | | | | Yes | Role; as Chooch |
| 1990 | Tales from the Darkside: The Movie | Yes | | | Yes | | |
| 2000 | Dinosaur | | Yes | | | | |
| 2007 | Diary of the Dead | | | Yes | | | |
| 2009 | Book of Blood | Yes | Yes | | | | |
| 2015 | Residue | | Yes | Yes | | | |
| 2021 | Dune | | | Yes | | | |
| 2024 | Dune: Part Two | | | Yes | | | |

=== Television ===
| Year | Title | Functioned as | | | | | Notes |
| Year | Title | Director | Writer | Producer | Composer | Actor | Notes |
|---|---|---|---|---|---|---|---|
| 1984-87 | Tales from the Darkside | Yes | Yes | | Yes | | Director (8 episodes), writer (5 episodes), composer (4 episodes) |
| 1987 | Night Rose: Akhbar’s Daughter | Yes | Yes | | Yes | | TV movie |
| 1988 | Scary Tales: Night Elevator | Yes | Yes | | Yes | | TV movie |
| 1988 | Monsters | | Yes | | | | Episode "The Legacy" |
| 1990 | Memories of Murder | | Yes | | | | TV movie |
| 1991-96 | Tales from the Crypt | Yes | Yes | | | | Director (2 episodes), writer (3 episodes) |
| 1992 | Nightmare Cafe | Yes | | | | | Episode "The Heart of the Mystery" |
| 1995 | Earth 2 | Yes | Yes | | | | Director (3 episodes), writer (1 episode) |
| 1995 | Donor Unknown | Yes | Yes | | | | TV movie |
| 1996 | The Assassination File | Yes | | | | | TV movie |
| 1996 | Profiler | Yes | | | | | Episode "I'll Be Watching You" |
| 1996 | Kindred: The Embraced | Yes | | | | | Episode "Nightstalker" |
| 2000 | Frank Herbert's Dune | Yes | Yes | | | | Miniseries (3 episodes) |
| 2003 | Frank Herbert's Children of Dune | | Yes | Co-Producer | | | Miniseries (3 episodes) |
| 2005 | Supernova | Yes | | | | | TV movie |
| 2005 | Painkiller Jane | | Yes | Executive | | | TV movie |
| 2008 | Blank Slate | Yes | Yes | | | Yes | TV movie Role; as Thomas Hale |
| 2009 | Mental | Yes | | | | | Episode "Bad Moon Rising" |
| 2010-12 | Leverage | Yes | | | | | 5 episodes |
| 2015 | The Librarians | Yes | | | | | Episode "And the Heart of Darkness" |
| 2015 | Residue | | Yes | Executive | | | Miniseries (3 episodes) |
| 2017-18 | Superstition | Yes | | | | | 2 episodes |
| 2019-21 | Creepshow | Yes | Yes | | | | Director (4 segments), writer (1 segment) |

== Soundtracks ==
- Effects – LaLa Land Records (LLLCD1040), Los Angeles
- Creepshow – LaLa Land Records (LLLCD1007), Los Angeles
- Day of the Dead – Taurus Entertainment/Numenorean Music, Los Angeles
- Tales from the Darkside: The Movie – GNP Crescendo (GNPD 8021), Los Angeles
- Creepshow – Waxwork Records LP, New Orleans
- Day of the Dead – Waxwork Records LP, New Orleans
- Tales from the Darkside: The Movie – Waxwork Records LP, New Orleans

== Awards and nominations ==
| Ceremony | Year | Category | Work | Result |
|---|---|---|---|---|
| Avoriaz International Fantastic Film Festival | 1991 | Grand Prize | Tales from the Darkside: The Movie | Won |
| Hugo Award | 2001 | Best Dramatic Presentation | Frank Herbert's Dune | Nominated |
| Writers Guild of America Award | 1988 | Best Anthology Episode/Single Program | Tales from the Darkside ("Everybody Needs a Little Love") | Nominated |
