= Johnny Sayles =

American R&B and soul singer (1937–1993)

John Earl Sayles Jr. (February 9, 1937 – August 17, 1993), known as Johnny Sayles, was an American R&B and soul singer.

Sayles was born in Winnsboro, Texas, United States. Around 1955, he moved to St. Louis, Missouri, where he sang with Eugene Neal’s Rocking Kings, and with Ike Turner's band, the Kings of Rhythm. In 1959, he formed the Johnny Sayles Band, who played at Chuck Berry's Paradise Club. He left music for a time to study in Houston, returning in 1963 to tour with the Five Du-Tones Revue, in which he imitated Little Johnny Taylor.

When the tour reached Chicago, Sayles settled there and signed a recording deal with the Mar-V-Lus record label run by George Leaner. His first records for the label, "Don’t Turn Your Back On Me" / "You Told A Lie", followed by "You Did Me Wrong" / "Got You On My Mind", appealed to both blues and deep soul fans, but failed to reach the national charts. After further singles on Mar-V-Lus, he joined Lou Rawls on a tour of Alaska, before returning to record on the Chi-Town, Minit and Chess labels in the 1960s. His song "Anything For You" was released in the UK and became a favorite on the Northern soul scene.

In the late 1960s, he recorded for Dakar Records, releasing an LP, Man On The Inside, in 1973, and in the early 1970s recorded on the Brunswick label. However, he gave priority to live performances rather than recording, and his vocal power and stage presence were said to rival James Brown. Writer Robert Pruter described him as "one of the most exciting singers I've ever seen." Sayles worked as a guard at Stateville Prison in the 1970s and 1980s, but returned to singing, guesting on Roy Buchanan's 1987 album Hot Wires and performing with Tommy Jamison's Soul Invaders.

Sayles died from a heart attack in 1993, in Hazel Crest, Illinois, aged 56.
