= When a Guitar Plays the Blues (Roy Buchanan album) =

Studio album by Roy Buchanan
- Released: July 1985
- Studio: Streeterville Studios (Chicago, IL)
- Genre: Blues rock
- Length: 43:11
- Label: Alligator
- Producer: Bruce Iglauer; Dick Shurman; Roy Buchanan

Roy Buchanan chronology
My Babe (1980)	When a Guitar Plays the Blues (1985)	Dancing on the Edge (1986)

Professional ratings
Review scores
Source	Rating
AllMusic	3/5 stars

When a Guitar Plays the Blues is the ninth solo studio album by American musician Roy Buchanan. It was released in July 1985 through Alligator Records, marking his first release for the label. Recording sessions took place at Streeterville Studios in Chicago. Production was handled by Buchanan himself together with Bruce Iglauer and Dick Shurman. It features contributions from singers Otis Clay and Gloria Hardiman, Criss Johnson on rhythm guitar, Bill Heid on keyboards, Larry Exum on bass guitar, Morris Jennings on drums, and Steele "Sonny" Seals on saxophone. In the United States, the album peaked at number 161 on the Top Pop Albums chart. At the 28th Annual Grammy Awards held in 1986, it received a Grammy Award for Best Traditional Blues Album nomination.

== Track listing ==
No.	Title	Writer(s)	Length
1.	"When a Guitar Plays the Blues"	Roy Lee Johnson; Harvard Hables	6:38
2.	"Chicago Smokeshop"	Leroy Buchanan	4:59
3.	"Mrs. Pressure"	Buchanan	4:38
4.	"A Nickel and a Nail" (featuring Otis Clay)	Vernon Morrison; Deadric Malone	4:28
5.	"Short Fuse"	Buchanan	3:31
6.	"Why Don't You Want Me?" (featuring Gloria Hardiman)	Osso	6:06
7.	"Country Boy"	Dave Bartholomew; Antoine Domino	3:45
8.	"Sneaking Godzilla Through the Alley"	Buchanan	6:16
9.	"Hawaiian Punch"	Buchanan	1:55
Total length:			43:11

== Personnel ==
- Leroy "Roy" Buchanan – vocals, guitar, producer
- Otis Clay – vocals (track 4)
- Gloria Hardiman – vocals (track 6)
- Criss Johnson – rhythm guitar
- Bill Heid – keyboards
- Larry Exum – bass guitar
- Morris Jennings – drums
- Steele "Sonny" Seals – saxophone (track 5)
- Bruce Iglauer – producer
- Dick Shurman – producer
- Justin Niebank – mixing
- Tom Coyne – mastering
- Ashley Kahn – liner notes

== Charts ==
Chart (1985)	Peak position
US Billboard 200	161
