= Johnnie Bassett =

American songwriter and musician (1935–2012)

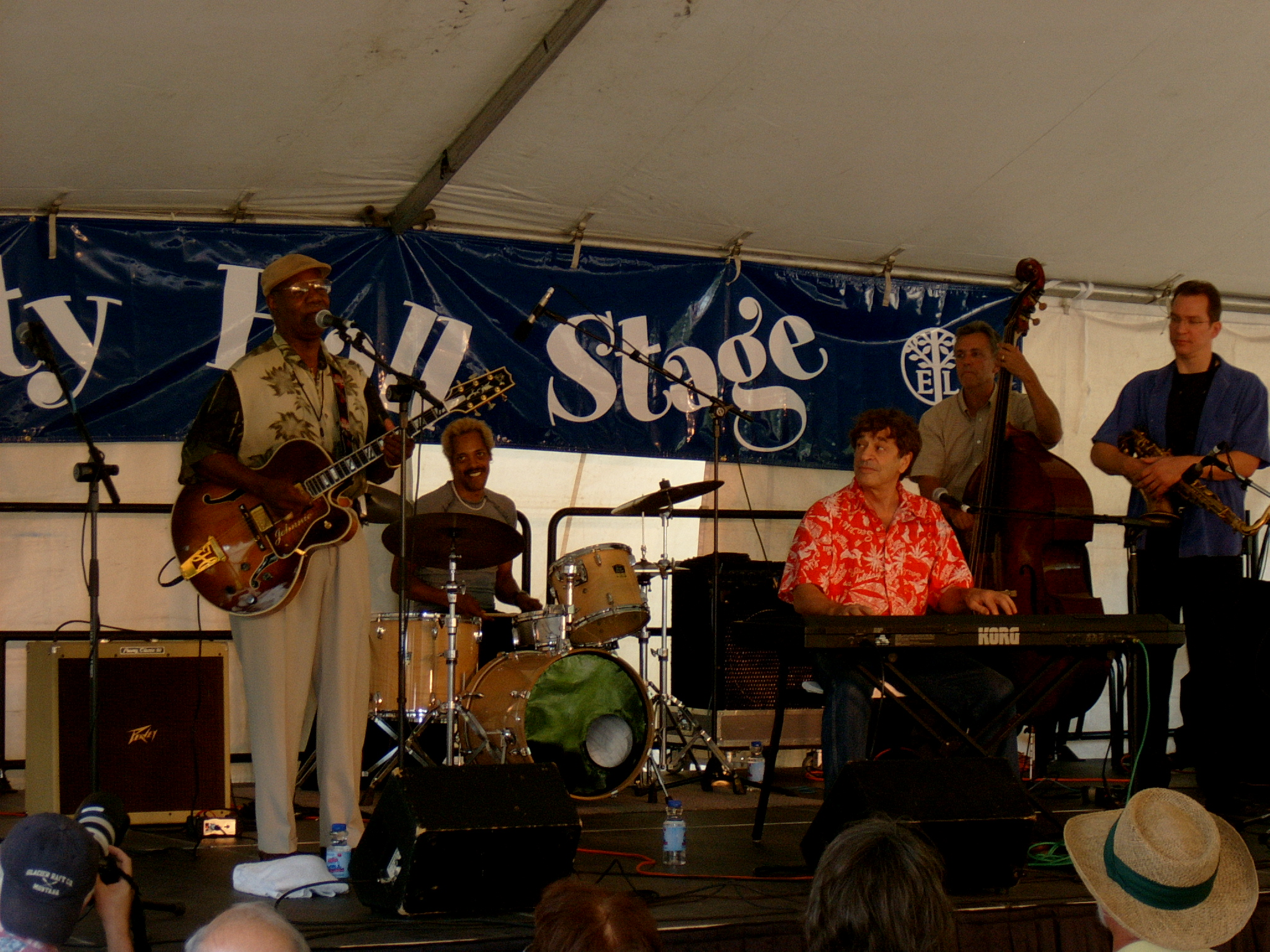
- Bassett and his band performing at the Great Lakes Folk Festival, 2006

Background information
- Born: Johnnie Alexander Bassett; October 9, 1935; Marianna, Florida, United States
- Died: August 4, 2012 (aged 76) Detroit, Michigan, United States
- Genres: Electric blues
- Occupations: Guitarist, singer, songwriter
- Instruments: Guitar, vocals
- Years active: Mid 1950s – 2012
- Label: Various
- Website: johnniebassett.net

Johnnie Alexander Bassett (October 9, 1935 – August 4, 2012) was a Detroit-based American electric blues guitarist, singer, and songwriter. Working for decades primarily as a session musician, by the 1990s Bassett had his own backing band. He released seven albums in his lifetime. He cited Billy Butler, Tiny Grimes, Albert King, B.B. King and especially T-Bone Walker as major influences.

== Biography ==
Born in Marianna, Florida, Bassett relocated with his family in 1944 to Detroit. He was a guitarist in the group Joe Weaver and the Bluenotes, which won local talent contests and backed Big Joe Turner, and Ruth Brown. In 1958, Bassett enlisted in the United States Army. Upon his return to Detroit he worked with the Bluenotes as session musicians for Fortune Records. During this time he provided accompaniment to Nolan Strong & the Diablos and Andre Williams. He later backed the Miracles in a short tenure at Chess Records, working on their debut single, "Got a Job" (1958). In concerts while in Detroit, Bassett played on stage alongside John Lee Hooker, Alberta Adams, Lowell Fulson and Dinah Washington.

Basset spent most of the next decade performing at gigs in Seattle and backing Tina Turner and Little Willie John.

The Detroit Blues Society recognized Bassett's contribution to the blues with a lifetime achievement award in 1994. He released the album I Gave My Life to the Blues on the Dutch label Black Magic in 1996, before recording and touring in North America and Europe with his own backing band, the Blues Insurgents. Their 1998 album Cadillac Blues was nominated for five W. C. Handy Awards. His record label at the time, Cannonball Records, ceased to trade, but Mack Avenue Records signed him to a new recording contract, after its owner saw Bassett and his band play in concert in the Detroit suburb of Grosse Pointe.

At the 2003 Great Lakes Folk Festival, Bassett performed as part of the Detroit Blues Revue with Alberta Adams and Joe Weaver. At the 2006 Detroit Music Awards, Bassett won an award for Outstanding Blues/R&B Instrumentalist. In 2010 and 2011, he was awarded the Outstanding Blues Artist/Group title.

Bassett's album The Gentleman Is Back was released in June 2009. In 2010, it won a Detroit Music Award in the category Outstanding National Small/Independent Label Recording.

Bassett and his band (Chris Codish, keyboards; Keith Kaminski, saxophone; and Skeeto Valdez, drums) played weekly at the Northern Lights Lounge in Detroit.

He died of cancer on August 4, 2012. In April 2022, the Killer Blues Headstone Project placed a headstone for Johnnie Bassett at the Detroit Memorial Cemetery in Warren, Michigan.

== Selected discography ==
- Live at the Montreux-Detroit Jazz Festival (1994)
- I Gave My Life to the Blues (1997), Black Magic
- Bassett Hound (1997), Fedora Records
- Cadillac Blues (1998), Cannonball Records
- Party My Blues Away (1999), Cannonball Records
- The Gentleman Is Back (2009), Mack Avenue Records
- I Can Make That Happen (2012), Sly Dog Records
