= Pasquale Buba =

American film editor (1946–2018)

- Born: April 16, 1946; Braddock, Pennsylvania, U.S.
- Died: September 12, 2018 (aged 72); Los Angeles, California, U.S.
- Occupations: Film editor; producer; actor
- Years active: 1975–2018
- Spouse: Zilla Clinton Buba (m. 1983)

Pasquale A. "Pat" Buba (April 16, 1946 – September 12, 2018) was an American film editor, noted for his longtime collaboration with George A. Romero.

== Biography ==
Pasquale Buba was born on April 16, 1946, as the second child of Edward Buba (d. 1997) and Angeline Buba (née Gentile; 1921–2017). His mother, who was born in the Italian city of Tursi, came to the United States in 1929. Buba grew up in Braddock, Pennsylvania, together with his older brother Anthony "Tony" Buba (born 1943).

Buba started to work as a sound engineer and editor in the early 1970s for Pittsburgh's WQED. Together with John Harrison and Dusty Nelson he founded the small Pittsburgh-based production company BuDuDa in 1973. The company, which was later renamed to The Image Works, produced commercial and industrial films.

He later met George A. Romero and had two short appearances in his films: as drug dealer in Martin and as biker in Dawn of the Dead. For Romero's next film Knightriders Buba supported Romero during the editing of the film, which Romero had done alone on all of his previous films. In 1985 Buba edited Romero's Day of the Dead. Both continued to work on films such as Monkey Shines, Two Evil Eyes and The Dark Half.

In 1995, Buba together with William Goldenberg, Dov Hoenig and Tom Rolf edited Michael Mann's film Heat, starring Robert De Niro and Al Pacino. Afterwards Buba was one of the editors for Pacino's directional debut Looking for Richard. Buba worked again with Pacino in 2000 for Chinese Coffee, in 2011 for Wilde Salomé and 2013 for Salomé.

Pasquale Buba was a member of American Cinema Editors.

He married production manager Zilla Clinton in 1983, and remained together until his death in 2018.

== Death ==
Buba died of lung cancer in his home in Los Angeles on September 12, 2018, at the age of 72, after a lengthy illness. His funeral was held on November 24.

== Selected filmography ==
=== Film editing ===
- 1975: The Winners (documentary series, 1 episode)
- 1975: Mister Rogers' Neighborhood (television series, 7 episodes)
- 1980: Effects
- 1981: Knightriders
- 1982: Creepshow (segment: The Lonesome Death of Jordy Verrill)
- 1985: Day of the Dead
- 1988: Monkey Shines
- 1989: Stepfather II
- 1990: Two Evil Eyes (segment: The Black Cat)
- 1990: Tales from the Crypt (television series, 3 episodes)
- 1993: The Dark Half
- 1993: Striking Distance
- 1995: Heat
- 1996: Looking for Richard (documentary)
- 1997: The Brave
- 1999: Simpatico
- 2000: The In Crowd
- 2000: Chinese Coffee
- 2003: I Witness
- 2004: Bobby Jones: Stroke of Genius
- 2005: Babbleonia (documentary)
- 2011: Wilde Salomé (documentary)
- 2013: Salomé

=== Acting ===
- 1977: Martin as Drug Dealer Shot By Police
- 1978: Dawn of the Dead as Motorcycle Raider (final film role)

=== Producer ===
- 1980: Effects
