= The Wind (Nolan Strong & The Diablos song) =

Single by Nolan Strong & The Diablos

from the album Fortune of Hits: Vol. 1
- B-side: "Baby Be Mine"
- Released: 1954
- Genre: Doo-wop, soul
- Length: 3:03
- Label: Fortune Records; Fortune 511
- Songwriters: Nolan Strong, Bob Edwards, Devora Brown
- Producer: Devora Brown

Nolan Strong & The Diablos singles chronology
"Adios, My Desert Love" (1954)	"The Wind" (1954)	"Route 16" (1955)

"The Wind" is a 1954 doo-wop song by Nolan Strong & The Diablos. The song appeared originally on the group's second 45 rpm single, "The Wind" b/w "Baby Be Mine" (Fortune Records). The lyrics describe a man who feels the summer wind blow as he thinks about a lover who left him.

In 2007, The Metro Times listed "The Wind" at no. 11 in The 100 Greatest Detroit Songs list – which was the November 11 cover story.

"The Wind" was the group's only national hit, though most of the group's other hits were local successes in Detroit, including "Mind Over Matter" (1962), which went to no. 1 on local radio station play lists in 1962.

== Cover versions ==
The Jesters reached no. 110 on the Billboard chart in 1960 with a cover of the song.

Mark Sultan of King Khan & BBQ Show, recorded a version of it for the 2010 tribute album, Daddy Rockin Strong: A Tribute to Nolan Strong & The Diablos. The vinyl LP was released by The Wind Records and distributed by Norton Records.

Laura Nyro covered the song live in concert and on her album, Gonna Take a Miracle.

The Chenille Sisters covered the song on their album, Mamma, I Wanna Make Rhythm (1991).

The Calveys featuring Gino Romano, a doo-wop group, released "The Wind" on a Comma Records 45 rpm (C-445).

== Personnel ==
- Nolan Strong – Lead vocals
- Juan Guitierrez – Tenor
- Willie Hunter – Baritone
- Quentin Eubanks – Bass
- Bob "Chico" Edwards – Guitar
