= Eastlawn Records =

- Founded: 1990
- Founder: RJ Spangler, Frank Traum
- Status: Active
- Genre: Blues, jazz, rock
- Country of origin: United States
- Location: Detroit, Michigan
- Official website: eastlawnrecords.com

Eastlawn Records is an American independent blues and jazz record label, based in Detroit, Michigan, United States. Co-founded in 1990 by RJ Spangler and Frank Traum, major artists include Alberta Adams, Planet D Nonet, RJ.Spangler's Blue Four, and Gino Parks.

== History ==
=== Founding ===
Eastlawn Records was founded in Detroit, Michigan in 1990, when drummer and bandleader RJ Spangler teamed up with an old friend from high school, Frank Traum. The name Eastlawn Records came from the Detroit street where Traum's father was raised, as a tribute to him. Spangler had also lived on Eastlawn Street in the late 1970s.

Traum, a local pharmacist, felt that friends of his, members of the Sun Sounds Orchestra, needed to be heard. The SSO were the first artist signed to the label, with members consisting primarily of current and past members of the Sun Messengers, another Detroit band co-founded by Spangler. Both groups shared an affection for jazz musician Sun Ra and African music.

=== Releases ===
The label's first release was a CD by the Sun Sounds Orchestra, the Afro-jazz group that Spangler was still then co-leading. The label has since released jazz, blues, soul, and some rock recordings with a focus on Detroit musicians. Among those artists are Detroit jump-blues band The Blues Disciples, who released their debut album in early 1993 on the label. Led by guitarist Paul Carey, the band also features musicians such as bassist Bob Conner on acoustic bass and R.J. Spangler on drums.

The label later signed Alberta Adams, a Detroit blues singer whose album Detroit is my Home was released exclusively on Eastlawn in 2008.

Spangler's band the Blue Four had a well-received album released in 2009, titled You Know I Can't Refuse: The Bill Heid Sessions. According to AllMusic, "Bill Heid spent some 15 years living in Metro Detroit. Drummer R.J. Spangler corralled Heid on a trip back to Detroit for this recording, showcasing the songs that Heid has performed regularly as a pianist and blues vocalist." AllMusic gave the album 4/5 stars.

In 2012, the album This Is What We Do was released on the label by the RJ Spangler Trio; Spangler's organ trio. The EP received radio airplay throughout the Midwest. Spangler is also a member of Planet D Nonet, a band signed to the label. Two of the band's numerous albums were Sun Ra tribute music.

== Artists ==
Current

- Alberta Adams
- Planet D Nonet
- RJ Spangler's Blue Four
- RJ Spangler Trio

Past

- The Blues Disciples
- Geno Parks
- Odessa Harris
- Sun Sounds Orchestra

== Discography ==
No.	Artist	Title	Year
ELD-001	The Sun Sounds Orchestra	Open Up the Doors	1991
ELD-003	The Blues Disciples ft. Camille Price and Terry Thunder	The Blues Disciples	1993
ELD-011	Alberta Adams	Live AA	2001
ELD-012	Odessa Harris Group	The Easy Life	2003
ELD-014	Alberta Adams	I'm on the Move	2002
ELD-013	Geno Parks	Live - On the Air	2003
ELD-015	Bill Heid / Johnnie Bassett	The Heid/Bassett Blues Insurgents	2003
ELD-016	Alberta Adams	Detroit's Queen of the Blues	2005
ELD-017	Alberta Adams	Detroit Is My Home	2008
ELD-018	Planet D Nonet	The Little Big Band	2009
ELD-019	RJ Spangler's Blue Four	You Know You Can't Refuse: The Bill Heid Sessions	2009
ELD-020	Planet D Nonet	Blowin' Away the Blues EP	2009
ELD-021	Planet D Nonet	Blues, Ballads and Beyond	2010
ELD-022	Planet D Nonet	We Travel The Space-ways: The Music of Sun Ra	2010
ELD-023	Planet D Nonet	Blowin' Away The Blues, Volume 2	2010
ELD-024	Planet D Nonet	Old School	2012
ELD-025	RJ Spangler Trio	This Is What We Do	2012
ELD-026	Planet D Nonet	Rays of the Sun	2013
ELD-027	Planet D Nonet	Just A-Sittin' And A-Rockin' With T-Bone Paxton	2014
ELD-028	RJ Spangler Trio	A Lil More	2015
ELD-028	Township Jazz Project	Live at the Scarab Club	2015
ELD-029	Township Jazz Project	The Duderstatd Session	2015
ELD-030	Garfield	Remembering Garfield: is greatest Hits	2015
ELD-031	James O'Donnell	Christmas in Detroit	2017
ELD-032	Planet D Nonet	Kings of Kansas City	2019
ELD-033	Live at the Scarab Club presents John Sinclair/Planet D Nonet	Monks Dream	2020
ELD-034	Kuumba	Reunion	2017

== See also ==
- List of record labels
