= The Jesters =

1950s Doo wop band

The Jesters were a doo-wop group based in New York City who achieved success in the late 1950s. They were students at Cooper Junior High School in Harlem, who graduated from singing under an elevated train station near 120th Street to the amateur night contest at the Apollo Theater, where Paul Winley discovered them and later signed them to his Winley Records.

The Jesters' B-sides often rivalled the lead song. Their first three singles were arranged by frequent Winley collaborator Davey Clowney, better known as Dave "Baby" Cortez, and all — "So Strange" / "Love No One But You", "Please Let Me Love You" / "I'm Falling in Love" (both 1957) and "The Plea" / "Oh Baby" (1958) — made the lower reaches of the national pop chart, and generated considerable New York interest. The original line-up consisted of Adam Jackson (tenor [ultra-high falsetto] lead), Lenny McKay (lead), Anthony "Jimmy" Smith (second tenor), Leo Vincent (baritone), and Noel Grant (bass). Some people have thought the smaller McKay was the falsetto lead, but it was actually the larger Jackson who sang the high notes. Many of their songs had dual leads by Jackson and McKay. An unusual song led solely by high tenor Jackson was the cha-cha "I'm Falling In Love". Jackson became the sole lead after McKay, Noel Grant and Leo Vincent left after the 1957 recording "I laughed". With a different line-up, with Adam Jackson as sole lead, The Jesters reached #110 on the Billboard chart in 1960 with a version of Nolan Strong & The Diablos' "The Wind" backed with "Sally Green". Two lesser singles followed, "That's How It Goes" / "Tutti Frutti" (1960) and "Uncle Henry's Basement" / "Come Let Me Show You How" (1961).

Winley conceived of their making a compilation album with their "equally fine" brother group, The Paragons. The Paragons Meet The Jesters (1959), with its gang cover and vocal duels inspired by doo-wop's street corner singing battles and live show group competitions, was "one of the first rock and roll compilation LPs" and the most commercially successful doo-wop compilation ever released.

== Sources ==
- Goldberg, Marv, The Jesters (2004, 2009)
- "Yukon Jack", "The Jesters", Destination Doo-Wop, August 9, 2005.
- Warner, Jay, (2006) American Singing Groups: A History from 1940 to Today, Milwaukie: Hal Leonard Corp. ISBN 978-0-634-09978-6
