= Alberta Adams =

American blues singer (1917–2014)

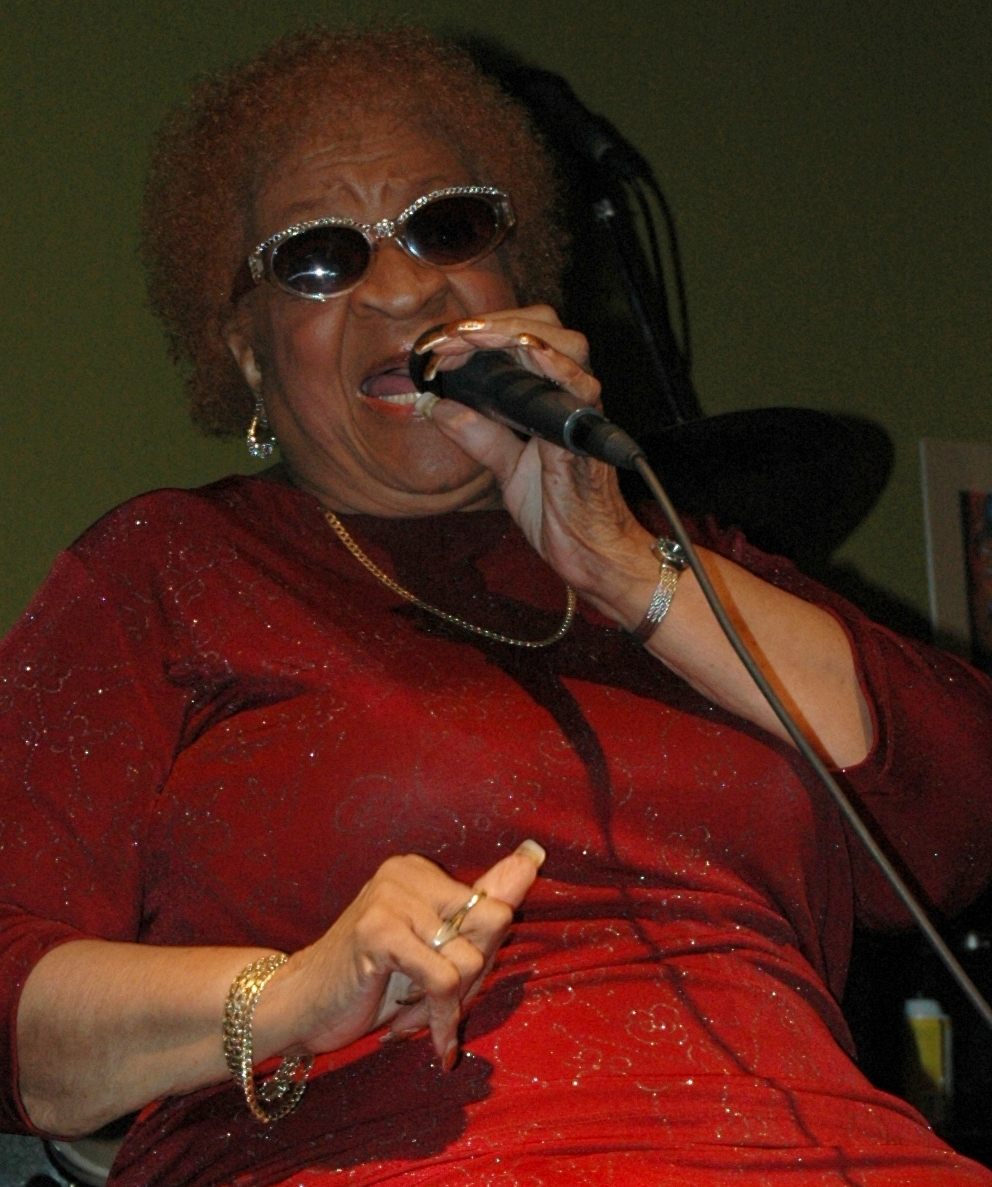
- Adams performing at Sushi Blues in December 2006

Background information
- Also known as: The Queen of the Blues
- Born: Roberta Louise Osborn; July 26, 1917; Indianapolis, Indiana, U.S.
- Died: December 25, 2014 (aged 97) Dearborn, Michigan, U.S.
- Genres: Detroit blues, jump blues, Chicago blues
- Occupation: Musician
- Instrument: Vocals
- Years active: 1930s-2014
- Labels: Chess Records, Savoy Records, Cannonball Records, Eastlawn Records
- Formerly of: The Bluesettes

Alberta Adams (July 26, 1917 – December 25, 2014) was an American blues singer.

Raised in Detroit, Michigan, she began performing as a tap dancer and nightclub singer in the 1930s. In 1952, she signed a recording contract with Chess Records and recorded with Red Saunders for the label. She toured with Duke Ellington, Eddie Vinson, Louis Jordan, Lionel Hampton, and T-Bone Walker, among others.

In her solo career, she secured a recording contract with the now-defunct Cannonball Records and recorded two albums for them: Born with the Blues (1999) and Say Baby Say (2000). Her 2004 album, I'm on the Move, was released by Eastlawn Records. In 2006 she released the EP Detroit's Queen of the Blues, which was named Outstanding Blues/R&B Recording at the 2006 Detroit Music Awards. At age 91 she recorded Detroit Is My Home, with Ann Rabson and Thornetta Davis.

== Early life ==
Adams was born as Roberta Louise Osborn on July 26, 1917, in Indianapolis, Indiana. She was raised in Detroit by family members, initially an aunt. From an early age she wanted to be an entertainer. Escaping a difficult home life at age fourteen, she began living on her own, getting a small apartment near Woodward, where she stayed for five or six years.

She began performing as a tap dancer in Detroit's Hastings Street clubs in Detroit and began singing shortly after. In the 1940s, she appeared at the B&C club as a tap dancer, among artists such as John Lee Hooker. When headliner Kitty Stevenson was too ill to perform one night, Adams gave an impromptu two-song performance, as a result of which the club hired her as a vocalist for a five-year stint. Among her contemporaries and musical teachers on Hastings Street were Hooker, Big Maceo Merriweather, Eddie "Guitar" Burns, and Eddie Kirkland.

== Music career ==
=== Early years ===
Phil and Leonard Chess, of Chess Records, heard Adams performing on Hastings Street and signed her as a vocalist in the 1950s. With Chess she recorded with Red Saunders's band, among other artists. Several of her recordings were included on Chess compilations in the 1990s. For a time she was a member of the Bluesettes, a vocal group that toured as part of Tiny Bradshaw's big band. She also recorded for Savoy Records in Newark, New Jersey, releasing the single "Say Baby Say", with the T. J. Fowler Band.

Adams toured with Louis Jordan, T-Bone Walker, Duke Ellington, Eddie Vinson, and Lionel Hampton, among others. After a hiatus from heavy performing and recording, she began touring with the guitarist Johnnie Bassett in the 1990s.

In 1997 she contributed to the Detroit edition of Blues Across America. AllMusic stated that, "Chanteuse Alberta Adams, a long time fixture on the scene, closes things out with four wonderful sides using a core band that revolves around Johnnie Bassett. With this entry in this important series, it's obvious that Detroit blues is alive, well and thriving." According to AllMusic, the album gave her career a boost and led to a recording contract for her upcoming solo albums.

=== Solo albums ===
Cannonball Records

In her solo career, Adams secured a recording contract with the now-defunct Cannonball Records and recorded two albums for them: Born with the Blues (1999) and Say Baby Say (2000). According to AllMusic, "Both albums were well received by blues critics and blues DJs, and they helped relaunch her touring career, as she frequented festivals around the U.S. and Canada in the late '90s and in 2000."

Her debut solo album, Born with the Blues, was released on February 16, 1999. She composed most of the songs and recorded them with a band featuring the guitarist Johnnie Bassett and the pianist Bill Heid. Born with the Blues made Living Blues magazine's Top 25 Albums for 1999. It received a positive review from AllMusic: "Adams runs through a batch of tunes ranging from jump blues, New Orleans R&B, smoky ballads and jazzy slow blues. A seasoned performer, Adams still has a sizable amount of honey in her voice...just solid singing by a true American music treasure."

Her second solo album, Say Baby Say, released on June 6, 2000, was recorded in October 1999. She again composed many of the songs. Bill Heid, the pianist from her previous release, produced the album and contributed to the composition of some songs. The drummer R.J. Spangler was a co-producer. MTV praised the backing band, saying they offered "tasteful support" and stating that "the main attraction here is the forcefully husky-voiced Adams. Emphasizing her candid attitude and masterful timing helps overcome the occasional moments where her expressive voice has been thinned by age." According to MTV, Adams "stared down considerable challenges and wastes no time with pity or tact on her new album Say Baby Say: Life’s Trials and Tribulations According to Miss Alberta Adams." The album received four out of five stars from AllMusic, which stated that in the album "Adams looked back on a life raising three children and three stepchildren, four marriages, and decades of blues performance. Such a life has its contrasts of ups and downs reflected in the album."

Eastlawn Records

According to JP Blues, "her solo career enjoyed a resurgence starting in the 1990s with her association with manager and musician R.J. Spangler [of Eastlawn Records]."

"[In I'm on the Move] her voice oozes with a seasoned blues singer's gruffness, but never falters on pitch, and she knows exactly how to phrase a line. Despite some of her darker days, Adams also brings a wicked sense of humor to the proceedings."
— Matt Collar of AllMusic

Her 2004 album, I'm on the Move, was released by Eastlawn Records, a Detroit label operated by Spangler. Backing musicians on the album, billed as the Rhythm Rockers, included Paul Carey (guitarist and co-producer) and Spangler (bandleader, drummer, and co-producer). The album was recorded in July 2003 and released in 2004. AllMusic gave it a glowing review and 4.5 out of 5 stars, stating the album "finds Adams at the top of her game and seeming to enjoy herself." The review also praised the production team, stating that Carey and Spangler "add an electric R&B aesthetic to the proceedings riding nicely between gutbucket shouters, mid-tempo swing and funky urban blues."

In 2006 her EP Detroit's Queen of the Blues with the Rhythm Rockers was released by Eastlawn. It was named Outstanding Blues/R&B Recording at the 2006 Detroit Music Awards.

At age 91, Adams recorded Detroit Is My Home, released by Eastlawn in 2008. She composed many of the songs. Background vocals were contributed by CeeCee Collins and Thornetta Davis. Among the band members were Shawn McDonald (organ), Ann Rabson (piano and composition), and Spangler (drums and production).

=== Final years and death ===
Adams was active as a performer and recording artist in her final years. In 2009 she contributed vocals and composition to the album Local Boys, by the Motor City Horns, and in 2010 she was a composer and guest artist on Blowin' Away the Blues, by Planet D Nonet. The following year she was a primary artist on the compilation album The Eternal Myth Revealed Vol. 1, featuring her older tracks with Red Saunders on Chess Records, and in 2013 she was a primary artist on the compilation album Definitive Detroit Blues, released by Not Now Music.

In February 2014, the singers Thornetta Davis and Tosha Owens were featured in the concert "To Alberta with Love", a tribute to Adams, who was then 96 years old.

Adams died on December 25, 2014, at the age of 97, in Dearborn, Michigan.

A tribute concert was given by her niece, singer Lily Delois Adams, in Detroit in July 2016.

== Style ==
AllMusic has called her "the personification of the Detroit blues scene," stating that "the undisputed, unrivaled, peerless Detroit Queen of the Blues is Alberta Adams." Mostly a self-taught vocalist, Adams mentioned the blues shouter Big Joe Turner and the singer-songwriters Dinah Washington, Sarah Vaughan, and LaVern Baker as some of her earliest musical influences.

== Discography ==
=== Solo recordings ===
==== Studio albums ====
Year	Album title	Release details
1999	Born with the Blues	Released Feb 16, 1999; Label: Cannonball Records; Format: cassette, CD
2000	Say Baby Say	Released June 6, 2000; Label: Cannonball Records; Format: CD
2004	I'm on the Move (with the Rhythm Rockers)	Released 2004; Label: Eastlawn Records; Format: CD
2008	Detroit Is My Home	Released 2008; Label: Eastlawn Records; Format: CD

==== EPs ====
Year	Album title	Release details	Certifications
2006	Detroit's Queen of the Blues (with the Rhythm Rockers)	Released 2006; Label: Eastlawn (ELD-016); Format: CD	2006 Detroit Music Awards: Outstanding Blues/R&B Recording

==== Singles (incomplete list) ====
Year	Title	Album	Certifications, Notes
1962	"I Got a Feeling"	7" single	Thelma Records
1992	"Remember"	Chess Blues	Chess Records compilation
1999	"Say Baby Say"	Single only	Cannonball Records

=== Composition and performance credits ===
Yr	Release title	Primary artist(s)	Label	Notes, role
1989	Traffic Mania	Joe Hunter, Baby Pepper	Meda Records	Vocals
1991	The Blues, Vol. 6: 50s Rarities	Various	Chess/MCA	Vocals
1992	Chess Blues	Various	Chess	Track "Remember" (composer, primary artist, vocals)
1997	Blues Across America: The Detroit Scene	Adams, The Butler Twins, Johnnie Bassett	Cannonball	Composer, primary artist, vocals
1999	Men Are Like Street Cars: Women Blues Singers 1928–1969	Various	Geffen/MCA	Primary artist, vocals
2004	1948–1953	T. J. Fowler	Classics	Vocals
2004	I'm A Bad, Bad Girl: Seven Dozen Dusky Divas 1939–195	Various		Track "Messin' Around with the Blues"
2005	Best of Motor City Music Conference 2005	Various	Detroit Fr	Primary artist, vocals
2006	Blues from the Heart, Vol. 3 (live album)	Various	The Soup Kitchen Saloon	Primary artist, vocals
2006	Golden Greats of Blues	Various	Weton-Wesgram	Vocals
2008	Uncut Detroit, Vol. II	Various	Venture	Primary artist
2009	Local Boys	The Motor City Horns	Brassjar	Composer, vocals
2010	Blowin' Away the Blues	Planet D Nonet	Eastlawn	Composer, guest artist, vocals
2011	The Eternal Myth Revealed Vol.1	Adams, Red Saunders	Transparency	Primary artist (compilation of Chess singles)
2013	Definitive Detroit Blues	Various	Not Now Music	Primary artist

== See also ==
- Detroit blues
