= Morning 40 Federation =

- Origin: New Orleans
- Genres: Pop, rock
- Years active: 1998–present
- Labels: M80, Bloodshot
- Members: Josh Cohen, Ryan Scully, Bailey Smith, Steve Calandra, Mike Andrepont, Dick Hukill

Morning 40 Federation is a rock band from the Ninth Ward of New Orleans which formed in 1998 and took a six-year hiatus in 2008. The band cites as influences King Oliver, Tom Waits, and Jon Spencer. They have also recorded as The New Orleans Hellhounds with Andre Williams.

The Morning 40 Federation performed a reunion show on October 31, 2009, at the Voodoo Experience music festival, and they also played another reunion show over Jazzfest weekend at One Eyed Jacks on April 24, 2010. The 40s played several shows during 2010 and 2011 in New Orleans, including shows at One Eyed Jacks on December 31, 2010, March 6, 2011, and April 30, 2011. They also played shows at d.b.a on May 20, 2010, and again on October 31, 2010. In 2012, they performed at the Krewe du Vieux Doo, on Sunday, February 4 after Walter "Wolfman" Washington's Afunkalypse at Habitat for Humanity ReStore on Press Street. They played another show on October 26, 2012, at One Eyed Jacks. Morning 40 Federation played again at One Eyed Jacks in New Orleans on February 8, 2013, with the Gnarltones. They played two new songs at this show. On November 9, 2018, the band played the Oak Street PoBoy Festival at the Maple Leaf Bar in New Orleans.

== Band members ==
- Josh Cohen
- Ryan Scully
- Bailey Smith
- Steve Calandra
- Mike Andrepont
- Rick Hukill

== Discography ==
- You My Brother (2000)
- Trick Nasty (2002)
- Morning 40 Federation (2004)
- Ticonderoga (2007)
