= Hot Wires =

Studio album by Roy Buchanan
- Released: 1987
- Studio: Streeterville Studios, Chicago, Illinois, U.S.
- Genre: Rock, blues
- Length: 44:05
- Label: Alligator
- Producer: Roy Buchanan, Dick Shurman, Justin Niebank, Bruce Iglauer

Roy Buchanan chronology
Dancing on the Edge (1986)	Hot Wires (1987)

Hot Wires is a 1987 album by American guitarist and blues musician Roy Buchanan. This was his third record for Alligator Records. It was recorded by Justin Niebank and mixed by Niebank and Tim Hale with Brian Poer and David Axelbaum assisting. It was mastered by Tom Coyne and produced by Roy Buchanan, Dick Shurman, Justin Niebank and Bruce Iglauer. This was Buchanan's final studio album. He died while in police custody the following year.

== Track listing ==
1. "High Wire"
2. "That Did It"
3. "Goose Grease"
4. "Sunset over Broadway"
5. "Ain't No Business"
6. "Flash Chordin'"
7. "25 Miles"
8. "These Arms of Mine"
9. "Country Boogie"
10. "The Blues Lover"

== Personnel ==
- Roy Buchanan – guitar and vocals
- Larry Exum – bass guitar
- Morris Jennings – drums
- Stan Szelest – keyboards
- Donald Kinsey – guitar
- Johnny Sayles – vocals
- Kanika Kress – vocals
