= Thornetta Davis =

American actress and singer (born 1963)

- Born: August 11, 1963 (age 62); Detroit, Michigan, United States
- Genres: Detroit blues, rhythm and blues, soul
- Occupation: Singer
- Instrument: Vocals
- Years active: 1987–present
- Label: Sub Pop
- Website: www.thornettadavis.com

Thornetta Davis (born August 11, 1963) is an American Detroit blues and rhythm and blues singer. She has opened for Bonnie Raitt, Gladys Knight, and Etta James, and sang backing vocals on Bob Seger's 1991 album, The Fire Inside. She also worked with Kid Rock and Alberta Adams, and has released three solo albums.

== Biography ==
Davis was born in Detroit, Michigan, United States.

After entering a local talent contest at the age of 15, Davis went on to join the group Jas which disbanded in 1983 and then she, and another former member of Jas, and two of her high school friends formed Chanteuse, a vocal group covering old R&B hits. She was recruited as a backing vocalist by Lamonte Zodiac & the Love Signs, a local soul group based outfit, who later became the Chisel Brothers. By 1991, Davis had moved on to back up singing for Big Chief, who recorded a couple of albums for the Sub Pop label. Following the group disbanding, Davis was signed to a solo recording contract with the same label, and issued an EP, Shout out to the Dusthuffer (1994), and the following year she released her first solo album, Sunday Morning Music. One reviewer commented "Davis' singing is just wonderful – she's got a rich, warm voice". A song from the album, "Cry", was used in the "Isabella" episode of the HBO television drama, The Sopranos. Earlier in 1992, Davis had appeared at the Ann Arbor Blues and Jazz Festival, and sang on stage with Bonnie Raitt and Katie Webster.

Between 1997 and 2003, Davis was a backing vocalist for Kid Rock, appearing on his albums, Devil Without a Cause (1998) and Kid Rock (2003), and she also sang on Kid Rock's single, "Wasting Time". In 2000, Davis performed backing vocals with Kid Rock when he opened the VH1 Vogue Fashion Awards at Madison Square Garden. Davis performed on the soundtrack for the 2001 film, Osmosis Jones. In addition, her voice was used on the television program, Xena Warrior Princess. Davis has also covered the blues standard, "I Just Want to Make Love to You".

She guested on Alberta Adams' 2008 album, Detroit is My Home.

In 2014, Davis performed at the Concert of Colors in Detroit with the Detroit Symphony Orchestra.

== Discography ==
Year	Title	Record label
1994	Shout Out to the Dusthuffer	Sub Pop
1996	Sunday Morning Music	Sub Pop
2016	Honest Woman	Independent

== Awards ==
At the Detroit Music Awards, Davis was voted Outstanding Blues Artist in 2004 and 2006, and Outstanding Blues/R&B Vocalist in 2004, 2006, 2010, 2011 and 2014. In 2018, she won the following Detroit Music Awards: Outstanding Blues Artist/Group; Outstanding Blues Songwriter; Outstanding Blues Vocalist; Outstanding Video/Limited Budget for “I Believe (Everything Gonna Be Alright)”; Outstanding Urban Songwriter; and Outstanding Urban Vocalist.

In 2017, she was nominated for a Blues Music Award in the Best Emerging Artist Album category, for her album, Honest Woman. In 2023, Davis was named as the 'Soul Blues Female Artist of the Year' at the Blues Music Awards. In 2025, Davis was again named as the 'Soul Blues Female Artist of the Year' at the Blues Music Awards.

== See also ==
- List of Detroit blues musicians
