= Salomé (2013 film) =

- Theatrical release poster
- Directed by: Al Pacino
- Written by: Oscar Wilde; Al Pacino
- Produced by: Robert Fox; Barry Navidi
- Starring: Al Pacino; Jessica Chastain; Kevin Anderson
- Cinematography: Benoît Delhomme
- Edited by: Pasquale Buba; David Leonard; Jeremy Weiss
- Release date: August 10, 2013
- Running time: 81 minutes
- Country: United States
- Language: English

Salomé is a 2013 American drama film directed by Al Pacino and starring Pacino and Jessica Chastain. The film is edited from Pacino's Wilde Salomé (2011), an experimental film that features a documentary mixed with dramatic performances, based on Oscar Wilde's 1893 play. Salomé presents the narrative and drama elements of the first film.

== Cast ==
- Al Pacino as King Herod
- Jessica Chastain as Salomé
- Kevin Anderson as John the Baptist
- Roxanne Hart as Queen Herodias
- Phillip Rhys as The Young Syrian

== Release ==
The film was theatrically released in the United States on August 10, 2013, and on September 21, 2014, in the United Kingdom and Ireland.
