= Marshall Brothers =

The Marshall Brothers
- Origin: Enschede, The Netherlands; Chicago, Illinois
- Genres: Rock; Polka
- Years active: 2005–present
- Labels: Animal Records; Pravda Records; TJ-Concerts
- Members: Cletus Marshall; Guy Marshall; Charlie Marshall
- Past members: Marshall Marshall; Toby Marshall; Skip Marshall; Dr Tom Marshall; Cpt Killdrums Marshall; Andre Williams

The Marshall Brothers are a Dutch/American rock band. They were the backing band for Andre Williams during his European tours in 2005 and 2006. Without American keyboard player Skip Marshall but with Canadian guitar player Dr Tom Marshall and American drummer Cpt Killdrums Marshall they occasionally also form Dutch rock band Atilla the Hun and the Quality Butchers.

The self-titled album peaked at number 69 in Australia in May 1975.
