= Thelma Records =

Record label

Thelma Records was an American record label in Detroit, Michigan, from 1962 until 1966. Recordings included Emanuel Laskey, Eddie Hill, Rose Battiste, Richard Street & the Distants, Alberta Adams, The Fabulous Peps and Martha Star. The label was formed by Hazel Coleman, mother of Berry Gordy's first wife, Thelma Coleman.
