= Effects (film) =

- Synapse Films DVD cover
- Directed by: Dusty Nelson
- Screenplay by: Dusty Nelson
- Based on: Snuff by William H. Mooney
- Produced by: Pasquale Buba; John Harrison (as John S. Harrison Jr.)
- Starring: Joseph F. Pilato; Susan Chapek; John Harrison; Bernard McKenna; Debra Gordon; Tom Savini
- Cinematography: Carl Augenstein (as Carl E. Augenstein); Toni Semple (as Toni Semple-Nelson)
- Edited by: Pasquale Buba
- Music by: John Harrison
- Production companies: Image Works; International Harmony
- Release date: November 9, 1979 (premiere)
- Running time: 84 minutes
- Country: United States
- Language: English
- Budget: $55,000 (estimated)

Effects (also released as The Manipulator) is an American horror film directed by Dusty Nelson. The film premiered on November 9, 1979, but did not receive a wide release until October 2005, when it received an official DVD release by Synapse Films. It features make-up effects by horror FX legend Tom Savini, who also appears in the film.

== Plot ==
The film centers on a filmmaker (John Harrison) who is making a low budget horror film in rural Pennsylvania. Over the course of filming, the cinematographer (Joseph Pilato) and a female gaffer (Susan Chapek) begin to enter into a romantic relationship. Unbeknownst to them, the film's director is secretly making a snuff documentary with an unwilling cast and crew.

== Cast ==
- Joseph Pilato as Dominic Salvucci (credited as "Joseph F. Pilato")
- Susan Chapek as Celeste
- John Harrison as Lacey Bickel
- Bernard McKenna as Barney/Arthur
- Debra Gordon as Rita/Mona
- Tom Savini as Nicky

== Production ==
In the behind-the-scenes documentary After Effects on the Synapse DVD, the three principal filmmakers involved - Dusty Nelson, Pasquale Buba, and John Harrison - discuss the film's evolution. They had met while working at a television station in Pittsburgh and later apprenticed under horror filmmaker George A. Romero on his 1977 film Martin. Using that film as an inspiration, they started an LLC and raised $55,000 from family and friends to fund the film.

== Release ==
The film received its world premiere at the Kings Court theater in Pittsburgh on November 9, 1979. Following this premiere, the film was signed for distribution to International Harmony and received limited distribution.

According to director Nelson, the film purportedly screened at the Sundance Film Festival, which at the time was known as US Film Festival. Effects later screened at Three Rivers Film Festival in 2011.

After its 2005 Synapse Films release, Effects was picked up by the American Genre Film Archive for a new 4K transfer from the original film print in 2017, and received a release on Blu-ray and a limited theatrical re-release.
