= Odessa Harris =

American singer

- Born: Dessie Mae Williams; June 8, 1936; West Helena, Arkansas, United States
- Died: August 18, 2007 (aged 71) Detroit, Michigan, United States
- Genres: Blues, jazz
- Occupation: Singer
- Years active: 1950s–2007
- Labels: Capitol, Uptown, Eastlawn

Dessie Mae Williams, known professionally as Odessa Harris (June 8, 1936 – August 18, 2007) was an American blues and jazz singer.

In a lengthy career, Harris toured for two years with B.B. King, who which gave her the stage name Odessa Harris, and recorded for Capitol Records. Later in 1993, she returned to recording, after a three-decade break, to release her debut album.

== Life and career ==
Williams was born in West Helena, Arkansas. She began singing in a church choir at her local Baptist church by the age of ten. After performing at several gambling houses, she gained a spot on the radio program King Biscuit Time at the age of 14, and then toured with Robert Nighthawk. This led to work with a touring carnival show between 1949 and 1953 before she relocated to Jacksonville, Florida in the late 1950s, where she sang in local nightclubs. In the summer of 1959, she and several of her friends attended a concert by B.B. King, where she was urged by the audience to sing a few numbers on stage with King. He told her afterwards, "if you want a job, the bus leaves in the morning." She boarded the bus and toured with King until 1961; it was King who gave her the name Odessa Harris.

After leaving King's entourage, Harris engaged with a new management and moved to Miami, Florida. A chance meeting in 1962 led her to record four tracks for Capitol Records, under the guidance of Clive Davis. However, the label was actively promoting the careers of Dinah Washington and Nancy Wilson at the time, and Harris' work floundered without any real support. In 1965, she recorded two singles for Uptown Records, including a version of "Since I Fell for You", written by Buddy Johnson. She moved again, eventually settling in Detroit, Michigan, in 1972. Harris found freelance vocal work in the Midwest and regularly sang with Sonny Freeman, who was formerly the drummer for B.B. King. Upon Freeman's death in the late 1980s, Harris retired from performing.

Harris lived in relative obscurity for a decade as a member of a local Buddhist community. It was not until her fellow Detroiter and Buddhist, the trumpeter Marcus Belgrave, persuaded her to return to performing in 2000. Her album The Easy Life, her first recording in 38 years, was released by Eastlawn Records in 2003. The Easy Life had a mixture of mid-tempo swing numbers including "As if You Didn't Know," which featured Belgrave, slow funk on the track "Pick up the Pieces," and Latin rhythms in "Road Warrior." The backing musicians included the drummer R. J. Spangler. In early 2007, under managerial guidance from Spangler, she toured northwestern Michigan, presenting well-received jazz concerts.

Harris suffered from emphysema and cancer in her later years. She died of heart failure in Detroit on August 18, 2007.

== Discography ==
=== Singles ===
A-side	B-side	Record label	Year of release
"A Rockin' Good Way"	"Nothing in the World"	Capitol Records	1962
"That's a Rockin' Good Way"	"I Wonder What's Come Over You"	Capitol Records	1962
"Nothing in the World"	"I'll Never Kiss You Goodbye"	Capitol Records	1962
"The Color of His Love is Blue"	"Driving Wheels"	Uptown Records	1965
"Since I Fell for You"	"You're What I Need"	Uptown Records	1965

=== Albums ===
Year	Title	Record label
2003	The Easy Life	Eastlawn Records
