= Rose Battiste =

American rhythm and blues singer

- Born: 1947; Detroit, Michigan, U.S.
- Died: 2023 (aged 75–76); Detroit, Michigan, U.S.

Rose Battiste (1947 – 2023; sometimes credited as Rose Batiste) was an American rhythm and blues singer from 1960s Detroit, Michigan, United States. Her best known tracks were "I Miss My Baby" written by Richard Parker as "D. Peoples", and "Hit And Run". In 1970, Ian Levine brought records from the U.S. to England, including Rose Battiste's "Hit and Run". Battiste was filmed performing at the Blackpool Mecca for the video collection The Strange World of Northern Soul by Ian Levine. She drew a following after being rediscovered in England during the Northern soul movement.

Battiste was originally signed to Thelma Records, owned by Berry Gordy's first wife. Don Davis produced her debut single "I Can't Leave You". Her second single, "That's What He Told Me" b/w "Holding Hands," was released on the Ric-Tic Records label in 1965. Bob Hamilton co-wrote both sides with Joanne Bratton-Jackson. Battiste also recorded with Golden World Records in 1966, singing "Sweetheart Darling", written by Al and Bob Hamilton, Joe Hunter, and Richard Morris, with "That's What He Told Me" also on the album. In 1970, she began working as a typist for Motown Records (the company that had bought out Ric-Tic several years prior), and ended up recording, although none of this has been released.

The backing track of "I Miss My Baby" was released in 1967 by Doni Burdick under the title "Bari Track" as an instrumental prominently featuring a catchy baritone sax riff which was barely audible (if at all) on Battiste's original. Neither song was a hit when released, although they were both later embraced by England's "Northern Soul" movement.

== Discography ==
=== Singles ===
- 1964: "I Can't Leave You" / "Someday"
- 1965: "That's What He Told Me"
- 1966: "Sweetheart Darling"
- 1966: "I Miss My Baby" / "Hit And Run"
- 1967: "I Still Wait For You" / "Come Back In A Hurry"
