= Cadillac Blues =

Studio album by Johnnie Bassett
- Released: 1998
- Studio: Royal
- Genre: Blues
- Label: Cannonball
- Producer: Ron Levy

Johnnie Bassett chronology
Bassett Hound (1997)	Cadillac Blues (1998)	Party My Blues Away (1999)

Cadillac Blues is an album by the American musician Johnnie Bassett, released in 1998. He is credited with his band, the Blues Insurgents. Bassett supported the album with a North American tour. Cadillac Blues was nominated for a W. C. Handy Award for best traditional blues album.

== Production ==
Recorded in Memphis, Tennessee, the album was produced primarily by Ron Levy, with assistance on some tracks by Willie Mitchell. It was inspired by Bassett's time as a Cadillac salesman. Most of the songs were written by Bassett and organist Chris Codish.

== Critical reception ==
Professional ratings
Review scores
Source	Rating
AllMusic	4/5 stars

The Record wrote that "Bassett wields a superb electric hollow body with that uptown urban style." The Chicago Reader noted that Bassett's "concise hollow-body sound is traditional, but he's no throwback—he's actually a hallowed veteran of the Motor City's 50s blues explosion." JazzTimes deemed the album a "sophisticated, urbane version of the blues." The Associated Press praised the "groove-laden jams."

The Detroit Free Press called the Blues Insurgents "one of the most facile, versatile and outright musical blues bands in the United States." Billboard concluded that "Bassett's lovely style is something any aspiring guitarist would want to emulate." The Star Tribune said that Cadillac Blues "offers oodles of tasty uptown T-Bone Walker-influenced guitar and vocals."

AllMusic wrote that "Bassett, musically, is a direct descendant of B.B. King circa 1965, with his pure, clean tone and long, flowing guitar lines uncluttered by electronic devices."

== Track listing ==
No.	Title	Length
1.	"I'm Gonna Do, What I'm Gonna Do"
2.	"Cadillac Blues"
3.	"Broke in Pieces"
4.	"I Can't Get It Together"
5.	"That's Fair Play"
6.	"Get Over Here Baby"
7.	"Raise the Roof, Raise the Rent"
8.	"Walk On Baby"
9.	"Memories of Your Perfume"
10.	"Cadillac Baby"
11.	"Dog House Is My Home"
12.	"Dresser Drawers"
