= Dancing on the Edge (album) =

Studio album by Roy Buchanan
- Released: June 1986
- Studio: Streeterville Studios, Chicago, Illinois
- Genre: Rock, blues
- Length: 37:44
- Label: Alligator
- Producer: Roy Buchanan, Dick Shurman, Bruce Iglauer

Roy Buchanan chronology
When a Guitar Plays the Blues (1985)	Dancing on the Edge (1986)	Hot Wires (1987)

Dancing on the Edge is a 1986 album by American guitarist and blues musician Roy Buchanan. This was his second record for Alligator Records. It was recorded and mixed by Justin Niebank, mastered by Tom Coyne and produced by Roy Buchanan, Dick Shurman and Bruce Iglauer. Delbert McClinton sang lead vocals on some songs.

== Track listing ==
All tracks composed by Roy Buchanan; except where indicated

1. "Peter Gunn" (Henry Mancini)
2. "The Chokin' Kind" (Harlan Howard)
3. "Jungle Gym" – instrumental
4. "Drowning on Dry Land" (Mickey Gregory, Alan Jones)
5. "Petal to the Metal" – instrumental
6. "You Can't Judge a Book by the Cover" (Willie Dixon)
7. "Cream of the Crop" – instrumental
8. "Beer Drinking Woman" (Peter Chatman)
9. "Whiplash" – instrumental
10. "Baby, Baby, Baby" (Aretha Franklin, Carolyn Franklin)
11. "Matthew" – instrumental

== Personnel ==
- Roy Buchanan – guitar and vocals
- Larry Exum – bass guitar
- Morris Jennings – drums
- Stan Szelest – keyboards
- Donald Kinsey – guitar
- Delbert McClinton – vocals on "The Chokin' Kind", "You Can't Judge a Book by its Cover" and "Baby, Baby, Baby"
