= Sunday Morning Music =

Studio album by Thornetta Davis
- Released: 1996
- Studio: White Room
- Genre: Blues rock
- Label: Sub Pop
- Producer: Al Sutton, Mike Danner, Phil Durr, Matt O'Brien

Thornetta Davis chronology
Shout Out (To the Dusthuffer) (1994)	Sunday Morning Music (1996)	Covered, Live at the Music Menu (2001)

Sunday Morning Music is the debut album by the American singer Thornetta Davis, released in 1996. Davis was the first Black artist signed to Sub Pop, a label initially known for its grunge releases.

== Production ==
The album was produced by Al Sutton, Mike Danner, Phil Durr, and Matt O'Brien. Davis was backed by members of Big Chief, for whom she previously sang. Eddie Harsch played keyboards on Sunday Morning Music.

Inspired by life in her downtown Detroit neighborhood, Davis wrote or cowrote all of the lyrics, aside from "You Haven't Done Nothin'", a cover of the Stevie Wonder song; Big Chief provided the music.

== Critical reception ==
Professional ratings
Review scores
Source	Rating
AllMusic	4/5 stars
Calgary Herald	4/5 stars
Entertainment Weekly	A−
MusicHound Rock: The Essential Album Guide	3/5 stars

The Calgary Herald stated: "Going for a bare bones backup of bass, drums and guitar (with occasional keyboards, congas or horns), Davis delivers a raw, riveting blend of funk, R & B, rock, blues and sweet soul music." Entertainment Weekly deemed the album "a knockout compendium of the sounds of her Detroit hometown." The Philadelphia Inquirer determined that it "sounds like '70s Rolling Stones and Rod Stewart—if they let the backup singers take over."

The Gazette wrote: "Crucially, the trad, tried and true musical vocabulary never slips into a lazy replay of '60s/'70s antecedents. Her choice of a Stevie Wonder cover, 'You Haven't Done Nothin'', seals it, placing the music in context without cementing it in cliché." The Toronto Star concluded that "the combination of the band's slightly skewed vision of funk and Davis' straight-up blues delivery makes for an unusual, wide-ranging but completely satisfying album."

AllMusic wrote that "Davis' singing is just wonderful—she's got a rich, warm voice that she doesn't show off with, avoiding pointless vocal high jumps and wails for confident, often soaring delivery." The Chicago Reader called Sunday Morning Music "a harrowing album full of desire and outrage."

== Track listing ==
No.	Title	Length
1.	"Cry"
2.	"Helpless"
3.	"Try to Remember"
4.	"Sunset"
5.	"Only One"
6.	"You Haven't Done Nothin'"
7.	"Box of Memories"
8.	"Sunday Morning"
9.	"The Deal"
10.	"And I Spin"
11.	"Come Go with Me"
