= A Street Called Straight =

Studio album by Roy Buchanan
- Released: 1976
- Studio: Electric Lady, Atlantic, Media & Record Plant Studios
- Genre: Rock
- Label: Atlantic
- Producer: Arif Mardin

Roy Buchanan chronology
Live Stock (1975)	A Street Called Straight (1976)	Loading Zone (1977)

Professional ratings
Review scores
Source	Rating
AllMusic	4/5 stars
The Encyclopedia of Popular Music	3/5 stars
The Rolling Stone Album Guide	3/5 stars

A Street Called Straight is an album by Roy Buchanan, released in 1976 on Atlantic Records. The album contains the instrumental, "My Friend, Jeff", in honour of British guitarist Jeff Beck. One year earlier Beck released Blow by Blow, featuring "Cause We've Ended As Lovers", which was dedicated to Roy Buchanan.

The album title comes from Acts 9:11.

== Critical reception ==
AllMusic wrote that "the reading of Jimi Hendrix' 'If Six Was Nine' is an almost natural extension of the original, with a brooding and slinky rhythm."

== Track listing ==
All tracks by Roy Buchanan except where noted.

1. "Running Out" (Buchanan, John Harrison) – 2:51
2. "Keep What You Got" (Buchanan, Joe Mardin) – 3:17
3. "Man On The Floor" – 3:26
4. "Good God Have Mercy" (Billy Roberts) – 4:09
5. "Okay" – 2:37
6. "Caruso" – 3:24
7. "My Friend Jeff" – 4:03
8. "If Six Was Nine" (Jimi Hendrix) – 4:04
9. "Guitar Cadenza" – 3:47
10. "The Messiah Will Come Again" – 4:11
11. "I Still Think About Ida Mae" – 3:44

== Personnel ==
- Roy Buchanan – guitar, vocals
- Rubens Bassini – percussion
- Kenneth Bichel – synthesizer
- Michael Brecker – horn
- Randy Brecker – horn
- David Brigati – backing vocals
- Eddie Brigati – vocals, backing vocals
- Robin Clark – vocals, backing vocals
- Billy Cobham – percussion, timbales, tom-tom
- Lew Del Gatto – horn
- Ronnie "Byrd" Foster – drums, vocals, backing vocals
- John Harrison – bass, vocals, backing vocals
- Will Lee – bass
- Buddy Lucas – harmonica
- Malcolm Lukens – keyboards
- Andy Newmark – drums
- George Opalisky – horn
- Barry Rogers – horn
- Gonzalo Sifre – percussion, drums
- Diane Sumler – backing vocals
- Luther Vandross – vocals
