= Bill Heid =

American jazz musician

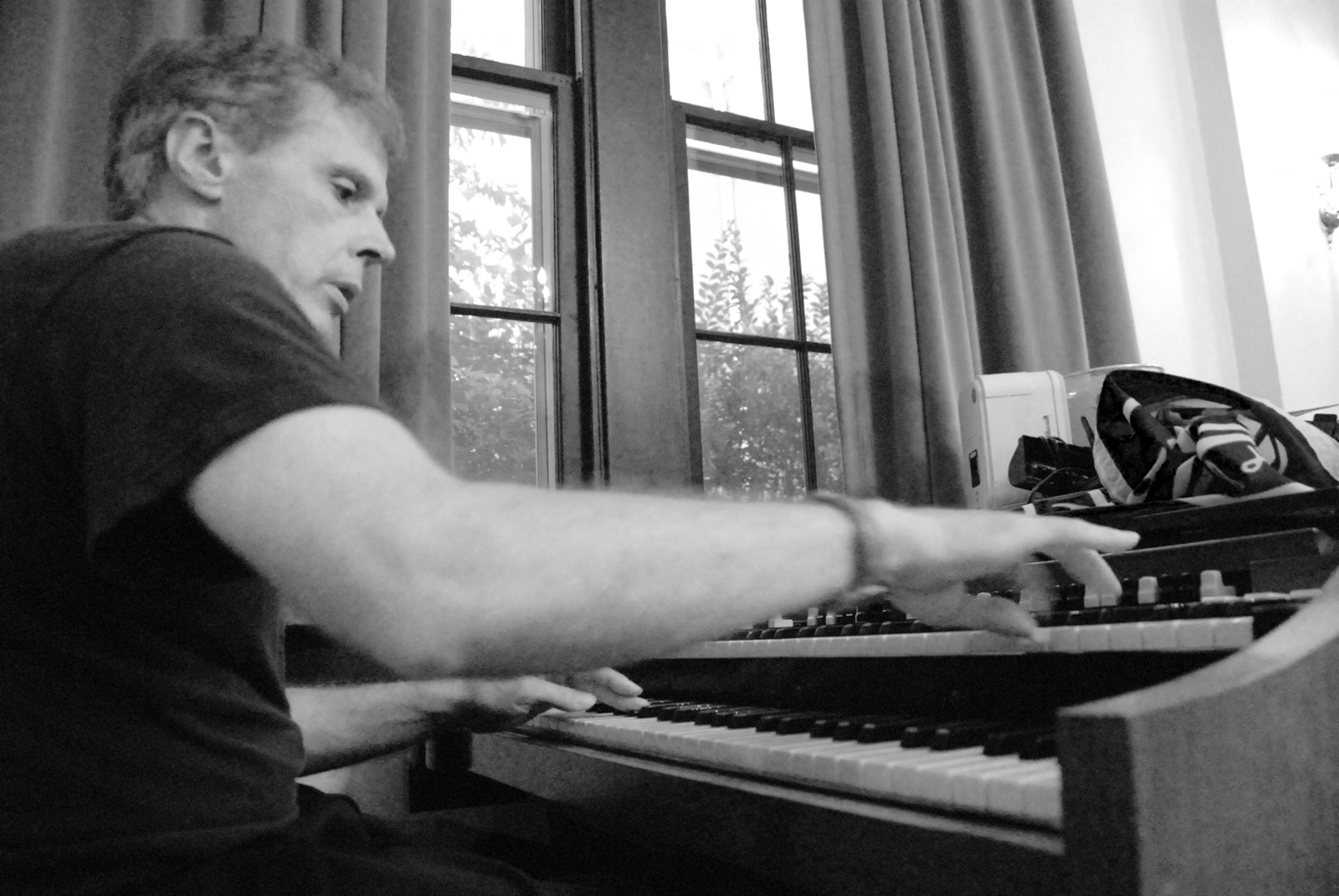
Photo by Jim Heid

Bill Heid (born August 11, 1948) is an American jazz pianist and organist from Pittsburgh, Pennsylvania.

== Discography ==
- This Is My Rifle (Westside, 1994 [1996])
- Bop Rascal (Savant, 1996 [1997])
- Bassett Hound with Johnnie Bassett (Fedora, 1996 [1997])
- Wet Streets (Savant, 1997 [1999])
- Dark Secrets (Savant, 1998 [2000])
- We Play the Blues with Johnnie Bassett (Black Magic, 2000)
- Da Girl (Savant, 2000 [2003])
- Air Mobile (Doodlin', 2006)
- Asian Persuasion (Doodlin', 2008)
- Wylie Avenue (Doodlin', 2009)
- The Happiness of Pursuit with Henry Franklin (Skipper, 2015)
- Dealin' Wid It (Savant, 2019 [2022])
