= You're Not Alone (Roy Buchanan album) =

Studio album by Roy Buchanan
- Released: August 1978
- Studios: Atlantic, New York, N.Y
- Genres: Rock, blues
- Length: 40:00
- Label: Atlantic
- Producer: Raymond Silva

Roy Buchanan chronology
| Loading Zone (1977) | You're Not Alone (1978) | My Babe (1981) |

Professional ratings
Review scores
| Source | Rating |
|---|---|
| The Rolling Stone Album Guide | 2.5/5 stars |

You're Not Alone is a 1978 album by American guitarist and blues musician Roy Buchanan. The album was a commercial failure, and led Buchanan to a break and a pause for reflection.

== Track listing ==
1. "The Opening...Miles from Earth" (Jean Roussel) – 2:02
2. "Turn to Stone" (Joe Walsh, Terry Trabandt) – 5:49
3. "Fly... Night Bird" (Roy Buchanan, Andy Newmark, Jean Roussel, Raymond Silva, Willie Weeks) – 7:47
4. "1841 Shuffle" (Roy Buchanan, Andy Newmark, Jean Roussel, Willie Weeks) – 4:18
5. "Down by the River" (Neil Young) – 8:42
6. "Supernova" (Roy Buchanan) – 3:26
7. "You're Not Alone" (Andy Newmark, Jean Roussel, Raymond Silva, Willie Weeks) – 8:01

== Personnel ==
- Roy Buchanan – lead guitar
- Ray Gomez – acoustic and rhythm guitar
- Willie Weeks – bass
- Andy Newmark – drums
- Jean Roussel – keyboards (not credited)

with:

- Gary St. Clair – lead vocals on "Down by the River"
- Alfa Anderson, David Lasley, Krystal Davis, Luther Vandross – backing vocals on "Down by the River"
