= Roy Buchanan (album) =

Studio album by Roy Buchanan
- Released: August 1972
- Studios: Record Plant East, New York City
- Genres: Rock, country, blues
- Length: 33:33
- Label: Polydor
- Producer: Peter K. Siegel

Roy Buchanan chronology
Buch and the Snakestretchers (1971)	Roy Buchanan (1972)	Second Album (1973)

Roy Buchanan is a 1972 album by American guitarist and blues musician Roy Buchanan. It is his second album and first for Polydor.

== Chart performance ==
The album debuted on Billboard magazine's Top LP's & Tape chart in the issue dated September 9, 1972, peaking at No. 107 during a twelve-week run on the chart.

== Critical reception ==
Professional ratings
Review scores
Source	Rating
AllMusic	4.5/5 stars
Newsday	C
The Rolling Stone Record Guide	1/5 stars

AllMusic commented: "It is a loose, highly improvised affair that amply demonstrates why the leader is one of the underappreciated giants of rootsy guitar."

== Track listing ==
All songs written by Roy Buchanan except where indicated.

1. "Sweet Dreams" (Don Gibson) – 3:32
2. "I Am a Lonesome Fugitive" (Casey Anderson, Liz Anderson) – 3:44
3. "Cajun" – 1:36
4. "John's Blues" – 5:06
5. "Haunted House" (Bob Geddins) – 2:44
6. "Pete's Blue" – 7:17
7. "The Messiah Will Come Again" – 5:55
8. "Hey Good Lookin' " (Hank Williams) – 2:15

== Personnel ==
- Roy Buchanan – guitar, vocals
- Chuck Tilley – vocals
- Teddy Irwin – rhythm guitar
- Pete Van Allen – bass
- Dick Heintze – keyboards
- Ned Davis – drums

Technical

- Peter K. Siegel – producer
- Shelly Yakus – engineer

== Charts ==
Chart (1972)	Peak position
US Billboard Top LPs & Tape	107
