= Wilde Salomé =

2011 film

- Film poster
- Directed by: Al Pacino
- Written by: Al Pacino
- Produced by: Barry Navidi
- Starring: Al Pacino; Jessica Chastain; Kevin Anderson
- Cinematography: Benoît Delhomme; Robert Leacock; Denis Maloney; Jeremy Weiss
- Edited by: David Leonard; Roberto Silvi
- Music by: Jeff Beal
- Release date: September 3, 2011 (Venice)
- Running time: 95 minutes
- Country: United States
- Language: English

Wilde Salomé is a 2011 American docudrama written, directed by and starring Al Pacino. An exploration of Oscar Wilde's 1893 play Salomé, the film premiered at the 68th Venice International Film Festival. At the festival, Pacino was presented with the Glory to the Filmmaker! Award and the film won the Queer Lion award.

The United States premiere of Wilde Salomé was held on March 21, 2012, at the Castro Theatre in San Francisco's Castro District. Marking the 130th anniversary of Oscar Wilde's visit to San Francisco, the premiere was a fundraiser for the GLBT Historical Society, with 1,000 tickets reserved for sale to the public.

A new version of the film without the documentary elements, titled Salomé, was released on August 10, 2013, in the United States and on September 21, 2014, in the United Kingdom and Ireland.

== Cast ==
- Al Pacino as himself / King Herod / Oscar Wilde
- Jessica Chastain as Salome
- Kevin Anderson as himself / John the Baptist
- Estelle Parsons as herself
- Roxanne Hart as Herodias
- Barry Navidi as himself
- Joe Roseto as The Young Syrian / Narraboth / Captain of the Guard / Himself
- Jack Stehlin as Nazarene / Jewish Leader / Himself
- Steve Roman as the Cappadocian
- Ozman Sirgood as King Herod / Desert Sequence
- Geoffrey Owens as Tigellinus / Himself
- Jack Huston as Lord Alfred

== Reception ==
On review aggregator Rotten Tomatoes, the film holds an approval rating of 80%, based on 15 reviews, with an average rating of 6.32/10. Metacritic gives the film a weighted average score of 65 out of 100, based on 6 critics, indicating "generally favorable" reviews.
