= Roy Buchanan =

American blues musician (1939–1988)

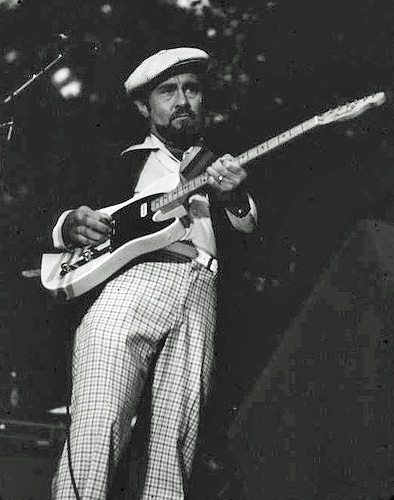
- Buchanan performing at the Pinecrest; Country Club, Shelton, Connecticut, 1978

Background information
- Born: Leroy Buchanan; September 23, 1939; Ozark, Arkansas, U.S.
- Died: August 14, 1988 (aged 48) Fairfax, Virginia, U.S.
- Genres: Blues rock, blues, electric blues, southern rock, roots rock, surf rock, hard rock
- Occupations: Musician, guitarist, songwriter
- Instruments: Guitar, vocals
- Years active: 1955–1988
- Labels: Polydor, Atlantic, Alligator
- Formerly of: Robbie Robertson, Danny Gatton, Dale Hawkins, Danny Denver, The Snakestretchers, The British Walkers
- Burial place: Columbia Gardens Cemetery; Arlington, Virginia, U.S.

Leroy "Roy" Buchanan (September 23, 1939 – August 14, 1988) was an American guitarist and southern rock/blues rock musician. A pioneer of the "Telecaster sound", Buchanan worked as a sideman and as a solo artist, with two gold albums early in his career and two later solo albums that made it to the Billboard chart. He never achieved stardom but is considered a highly influential guitarist. Guitar Player praised him as having one of the "50 Greatest Tones of All Time". He appeared on the PBS music program Austin City Limits in 1977 (season 2).

== Biography ==
=== Birth and early career: 1939–1960 ===
Leroy Buchanan was born in Ozark, Arkansas and was raised there and in Pixley, California, a farming area between Visalia and Bakersfield. His father was a sharecropper in Arkansas and a farm laborer in California. Buchanan told interviewers the fiction that his father was a fiddle-playing preacher, which was repeated in Guitar Player magazine but disputed by his older brother J.D. Buchanan told how his first musical memories were of racially mixed revival meetings he attended with his mother, Minnie. "Gospel," he recalled, "that's how I first got into black music". He drew on many disparate influences while learning to play the guitar (though he later claimed his aptitude came from being "half-wolf"). He initially showed talent on steel guitar before switching to guitar in the early 1950s, and he started his professional career at 15 in Johnny Otis's rhythm and blues revue.

In 1958, Buchanan made his recording debut with Chicago's Chess Records at age 19, accompanying Dale Hawkins by playing the solo on "My Babe". Two years later, during a tour through Toronto, Buchanan left Dale Hawkins to play for Hawkins's cousin Ronnie Hawkins and tutor Ronnie's guitar player, Robbie Robertson. Buchanan plays bass on the Ronnie Hawkins single "Who Do You Love?". Buchanan soon returned to the United States, and members of the Ronnie Hawkins' group later gained fame as the roots rock group the Band. In the early 1960s, Buchanan often played as a sideman with various rock bands, and he played guitar in recording sessions with Freddy Cannon, Merle Kilgore, and others. At the end of the 1960s, with a growing family, Buchanan left the music industry to learn a trade and trained as a barber.

=== Recording career: 1961–1988 ===
In 1961, he released "Mule Train Stomp", his first single for Swan, featuring rich guitar tones. Buchanan's 1962 recording with drummer Bobby Gregg, nicknamed "Potato Peeler," first introduced the trademark Buchanan "pinch" harmonic. An effort to cash in on the British Invasion led Buchanan to join the British Walkers. In the mid-1960s, Buchanan settled down in the Washington, D.C., area, playing for Danny Denver's band for many years while acquiring a reputation as "...one of the very finest rock guitarists around". The facts behind that claim are that in March 1968 a photographer friend, John Gossage gave Buchanan tickets to a concert by the Jimi Hendrix Experience at the Washington Hilton. "Buchanan was dismayed to find his own trademark sounds, like the wah-wah that he'd painstakingly produced with his hands and his Telecaster, created by electronic pedals. He could never attempt Hendrix's stage show, and this realization refocused him on his own quintessentially American roots-style guitar picking".

Gossage recalls how Buchanan was impressed by the Jimi Hendrix 1967 debut album Are You Experienced?, and Gossage gave Roy Buchanan a ticket of Jimi Hendrix show. That same night (as the Hilton show), Buchanan played several Hendrix numbers and "from that point on, had nothing but good things to say about Hendrix". He later released recordings of the Hendrix composition "If 6 Was 9" and the Hendrix hit "Hey Joe". In the early 1970s, he performed in the Washington, D.C.–Maryland–Virginia area with the Danny Denver Band, which had a local following.

Buchanan's life changed in 1971, when he gained national notice after an hour-long PBS television documentary. Entitled Introducing Roy Buchanan, and sometimes mistakenly called The Best Unknown Guitarist in the World, it earned Buchanan a recording contract with Polydor Records and praise from John Lennon and Merle Haggard, along with an alleged invitation to join the Rolling Stones (which he turned down and which gave him the nickname "the man who turned the Stones down"). He may have turned the Stones down for two reasons. He may have feared abusing drugs and alcohol more if he joined them, and dying, like Brian Jones. And he may have felt that his own career as he was then pursuing it had promising directions that he could not follow as well if he joined the Stones. In 1977, he appeared on the PBS music program Austin City Limits during Season 2. He recorded five albums for Polydor, one of which, Second Album, went gold, and after that another three for Atlantic Records, one of which, 1977's Loading Zone, also went gold. Buchanan quit recording in 1981, vowing never to enter a studio again unless he could record his own music his own way. Four years later, Alligator Records coaxed Buchanan back into the studio.

His first album for Alligator, When a Guitar Plays the Blues, was released in early 1985. It was the first time he had total artistic freedom in the studio. His second Alligator LP, Dancing on the Edge (with vocals on three tracks by Delbert McClinton), was released in late 1986. He released his 12th and final album, Hot Wires, in 1987. Buchanan's last show was on August 7, 1988, at Guilford Fairgrounds in Guilford, Connecticut.

=== Death ===
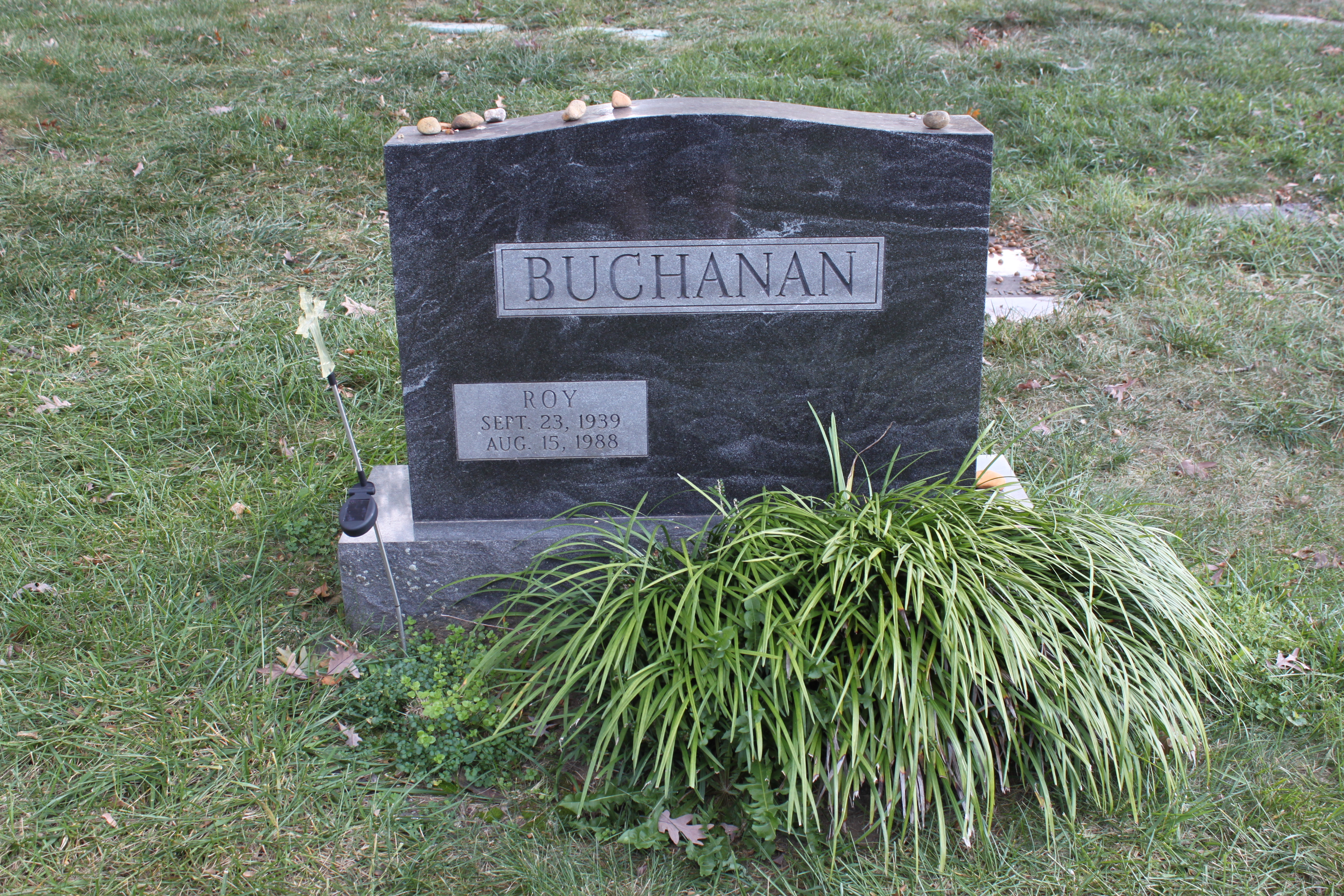
Grave of Buchanan in Columbia Gardens Cemetery

According to his agent and others, Buchanan was doing well, having gained control of his drinking habit and playing again, when he was arrested for public intoxication after a domestic dispute. He was found hanged from his own shirt in a jail cell on August 14, 1988, in the Fairfax County, Virginia, Jail. According to Thomas Hartman, who was in a cell near Buchanan's, the deputy sheriff opened the door early in the morning and found Buchanan with the shirt around his neck. His cause of death was officially recorded as suicide, a finding disputed by Buchanan's friends and family. One of his friends, Marc Fisher, reported seeing Buchanan's body with bruises on the head.

After his death, compilation and other albums continue to be released, including in 2004 the never-released first album he recorded for Polydor, The Prophet. Roy Buchanan is interred at Columbia Gardens Cemetery in Arlington, Virginia.

== Equipment ==
Buchanan used a number of guitars in his career, although he was most often associated with a 1953 Fender Telecaster, serial number 2324, nicknamed "Nancy". At some point "Nancy" had jumbo frets installed, but remained largely original. There are two very different stories explaining how Buchanan got the guitar. He himself said that, while enrolled in 1969 in a school to learn to be a hairdresser, he ran after a guy walking down the street with that guitar, and bought him a purple Telecaster to trade. Buchanan also owned a Butterscotch Blonde 1952 Fender Telecaster that eventually wound up in the possession of Wishbone Ash guitarist Andy Powell. A friend of Buchanan's, however, said that Buchanan was playing a Gibson Les Paul at the time, and traded it for the 1953 Telecaster. One of Buchanan's Telecasters was later owned by Danny Gatton and then Mike Stern, who lost it in a robbery. He was reported using a 1956 Gibson Les Paul Goldtop Reissue for some time. Early in 1979, he switched to a 1975 sunburst Fender Stratocaster for a few years. Also, he used to play a Gibson L-5 CES when he was very young.

== Tone and technique ==
Buchanan played the Telecaster through a Fender Vibrolux amplifier with the volume and tone "full out", and used the guitar's volume and tone controls to control volume and sound (he achieved a wah wah effect using the tone control). To achieve his desired distorted sounds, Buchanan at one point used a razor blade to slit the paper cones of the speakers in his amplifier, an approach also employed by the Kinks's Dave Davies and others. Buchanan rarely used effects pedals, though he started using an Echoplex on A Street Called Straight (1976). In his later career he played with a Boss DD-2 delay.

Buchanan taught himself various playing techniques, including "chicken picking". He sometimes used his thumb nail rather than a plectrum, and also employed it to augment his index finger and pick. Holding the pick between his thumb and forefinger, Buchanan also plucked the string and simultaneously touched it lightly with the lower edge of his thumb at one of the harmonic nodes, thus suppressing lower overtones and emphasising the harmonic, sometimes referred to as pinch harmonics, though Buchanan called it an "overtone". Buchanan could play harmonics at will, and could mute individual strings with free right-hand fingers while picking or pinching others. He was noted as well for his oblique bends. This was particularly notable in his approach to using double and triple stops.

== Legacy ==
Buchanan has influenced many guitarists, including Robbie Robertson, Gary Moore, Danny Gatton, Arlen Roth, Jeff Beck, David Gilmour, Jerry Garcia, Mick Ronson, Nils Lofgren, Jim Campilongo, and Steve Kimock; Beck dedicated his version of "Cause We've Ended As Lovers" from Blow by Blow to him. His work is said to "stretch the limits of the electric guitar," and he is praised for "his subtlety of tone and the breadth of his knowledge, from the blackest of blues to moaning R&B and clean, concise, bone-deep rock 'n' roll".

In 2004, Guitar Player listed his version of "Sweet Dreams," from his debut album on Polydor, Roy Buchanan, as having one of the "50 Greatest Tones of All Time". In the same year, the readers of Guitar Player voted Buchanan number 46 in a top 50 readers' poll.

== Discography ==
=== Studio albums ===
- Buch and the Snakestretchers, 1971, BIOYA (homemade/self-produced/sold only at gigs); 1992 CD reissue: Genes/Adelphi
- Roy Buchanan, August 1972, Polydor - US number 107
- Second Album, March 1973, Polydor - US number 86
- That's What I Am Here For, November 1973, Polydor - US number 152
- In the Beginning (UK title: Rescue Me), December 1974, Polydor - US number 160
- A Street Called Straight, April 1976, Atlantic - US number 148
- Loading Zone, May 1977, Atlantic - US number 105
- You're Not Alone, April 1978, Atlantic - US number 119
- My Babe, November 1980, Waterhouse/AJK - US number 193
- When a Guitar Plays the Blues, July 1985, Alligator - US number 161
- Dancing on the Edge, June 1986, Alligator - US number 153
- Hot Wires, September 1987, Alligator

=== Live albums ===
- Live Stock, (rec. 1974) August 1975, Polydor
- Live in Japan, (rec. 1977) 1978, Polydor [Japan]
- Live: Charly Blues Legend, Vol. 9, 1987, Charly
- Live in U.S.A. & Holland, (rec. 1977–85) 1991, Silver Shadow
- Charly Blues Masterworks: Roy Buchanan Live, 1999, Charly/Red X
- American Axe: Live in 1974, 2003, Powerhouse
- Live: Amazing Grace, (rec. 1974–83) 2009, Powerhouse
- Live at Rockpalast, (rec. 1985) 2011, MIG Music
- Live from Austin, TX (rec. 1976) 2012, New West
- Shredding the Blues: Live at My Father's Place, (rec. 1978 & 1984) 2014, Rockbeat
- Telemaster: Live in '75, 2017, Powerhouse
- Live at Town Hall 1974, 2018, Real Gone Music

=== Compilation albums ===
- The Best of Roy Buchanan, 1982, Polydor
- The Early Years, 1989, Krazy Kat
- Sweet Dreams: The Anthology, 1992, Polydor
- Guitar on Fire: The Atlantic Sessions, 1993, Rhino/Atlantic
- Malaguena, 1996, Annecillo
- Before And After: The Last Recordings, 1999, Rollercoaster [UK]
- Deluxe Edition: Roy Buchanan, 2001, Alligator
- 20th Century Masters–The Millennium Collection: The Best of Roy Buchanan, 2002, Polydor
- The Prophet: The Unreleased First Polydor Album, 2004, Hip-O Select/UMe
- The Definitive Collection, 2006, Polydor/UMe
- Rhino Hi-Five: Roy Buchanan, 2007, Rhino/Atlantic
- After Hours: The Early Years (1957–1962 Recordings), 2016, Soul Jam [EU]
