= Fortune Records =

Record label

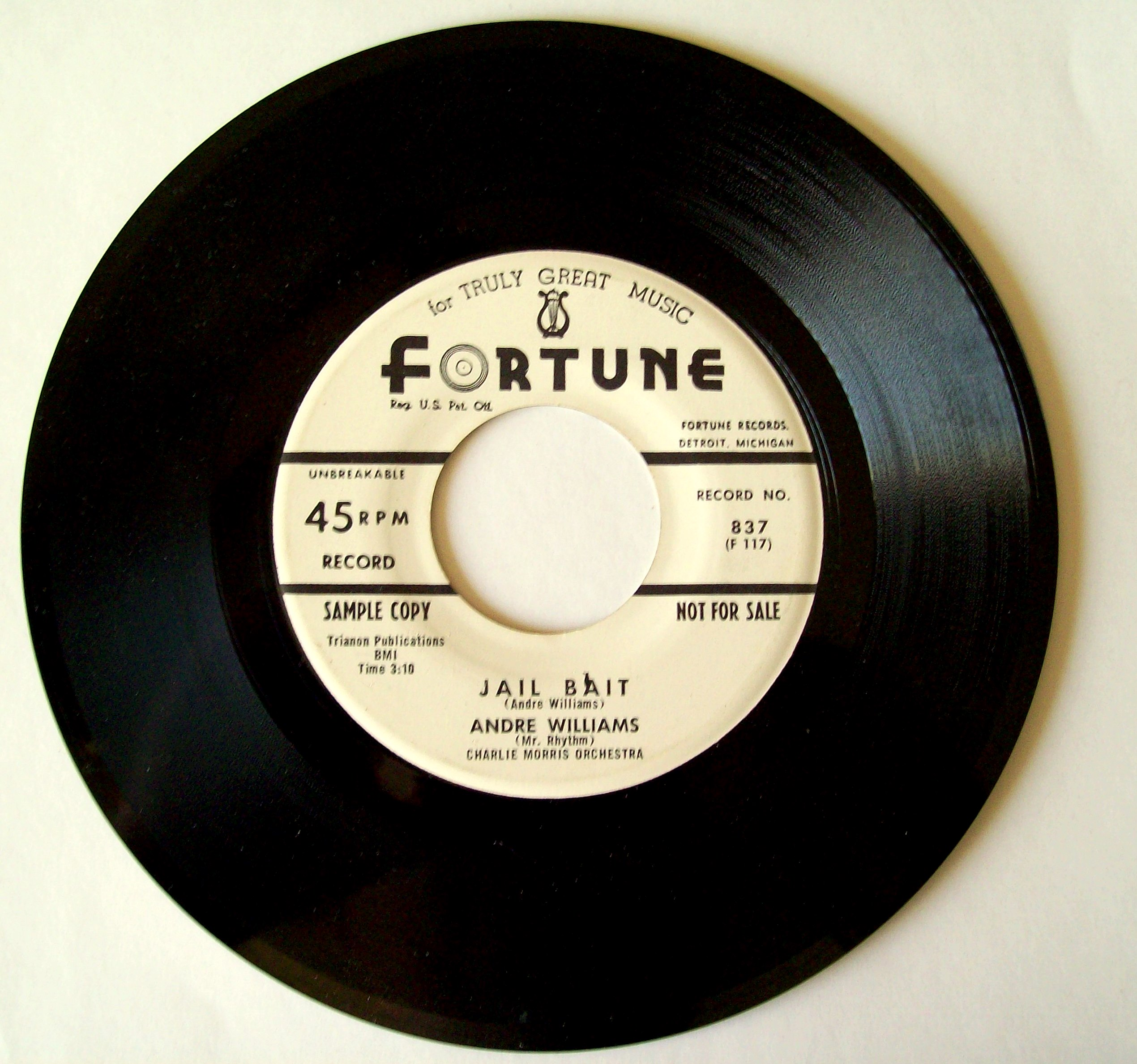
Fortune promotional 45rpm record

Fortune Records was an American family-operated, independent record label located in Detroit, Michigan from 1946 to 1995. The label owners were Jack and Devora Brown, their son Sheldon Brown recorded for the label. Original releases tapered off after 1972 aside from a few albums in the mid-1980s. Fortune specialized in R&B, blues, soul and doo-wop music, although the label also released pop, big band, hillbilly, gospel, rock and roll, and polka records.

== History ==
Fortune released some doo-wop tunes by Nolan Strong & The Diablos, such as "The Wind" (Fortune 511, 1954), "The Way You Dog Me Around" (Fortune 518, 1955), and "Mind Over Matter" (Fortune 546, 1962). Other notable artists on Fortune included John Lee Hooker, Doctor Ross, Andre Williams, and Nathaniel Mayer & The Fabulous Twilights (whose release, "Village of Love," on both Fortune 545 and United Artists 449 in the spring of 1962, was perhaps its most popular release; it reached No. 22 pop and No. 16 R&B on the Billboard chart). "Village of Love" also made the Top Ten in local radio station surveys in New York, Los Angeles, and Chicago. It was No. 1 in Detroit.

Prior to "Village of Love," Fortune's biggest-selling record was likely "Bacon Fat" (Fortune 831 and Epic 9196, late 1956) by Andre Williams and His New Group (which was the Five Dollars on Fortune not Epic), which featured Williams' proto-rap over a sleazy, bluesy arrangement. "Bacon Fat" (the name of the song refers to a dance) reached No. 9 R&B on the Billboard chart in early 1957, after it was leased to Columbia's Epic subsidiary for national distribution.

The Five Dollars were from Detroit and were originally known as The Shamrocks and The Del Torros. The members of the group were lead singer Eddie Hurt, tenors Lonnie Heard and Richard Lawrence, baritone James Drayton, and bass Charles Evans. After working on their music and stage presence, they picked up a manager named Sandy Amour and began to sing at area clubs and talent shows. What they were looking for most at the time was a chance to record, and soon in 1955, that goal was realized with a session at home town independent Fortune Records. On August 20, 1955, Devora Brown of Fortune announced the signing of the group along with Andre Williams (who was related through marriage to Eddie Hurt) who would also record with the Five Dollars.

The newly renamed Five Dollars recorded some songs for Fortune and in the late summer of 1955 the label released "Doctor Baby" and "Harmony Of Love". Richard Lawrence was soon drafted into the military and so the Five Dollars became a vocal quartet. In October, Fortune released "Going Down To Tijuana" and "Pulling Time" by Andre Williams and the group which was billed on the label as Andre Williams & The Don Juans. In December 1955, Fortune Records announces the release of The Five Dollars with "So Strange" and "You Know I Can't Refuse". However, the record was not actually released until March 1956.

Record collectors often find Fortune's numbering system confusing because there were several series issued at once, and also because some particular record numbers were used more than once.

From the early 1950s to fall 1956, Fortune had a storefront at 11629 Linwood (now demolished). However, Fortune's best-known location was at 3942 Third Avenue in a small concrete block building. Fortune moved there in the fall of 1956 and stayed there until the mid-1990s, when the building was sold and vacated. (The landmark building was demolished late in 2001.) The storefront contained a record shop in the front (the Browns sold their product direct to the public) and the crude 18 by 40 ft (5.5 by 12.2 m) studio in the rear (which originally had a dirt floor).

Whereas its far bigger Detroit rival, Motown Records, perfected a highly polished pop sound, releases on Fortune Records were often characterized by raw, unrestrained vocal performances and relatively simple instrumental arrangements, recorded without excessive care for production values. The recording was accomplished via a few microphones to an Ampex one-track tape deck. As a result, the label's records have a distinctively direct sound and often packed considerable emotional power. It is estimated that Fortune Records and its subsidiaries, Hi-Q Records and Strate-8, released over 600 78 rpm shellac and 45 rpm vinyl records, as well as two dozen long-playing albums, during its existence.

The Fortune Records studio and office on Third Avenue in Detroit was demolished on October 27, 2001.

Sheldon Brown still controls the Fortune Records catalogue, which is managed by Westwood Music Group. Yeah Mama Records has issued the Fortune catalog on CDs with distribution by The Orchard unit of Sony Music.

== Artists ==
- John Brim
- The Davis Sisters
- Maury Dean
- Calvin Frazier
- Bobo Jenkins
- Eddie Kirkland
- David Lasley
- John Lee Hooker
- Nathaniel Mayer
- Skeets McDonald
- Big Maceo Merriweather
- Gino Parks
- Johnny Powers
- Doctor Ross
- Floyd Smith
- Nolan Strong & The Diablos
- Joe Weaver
- Andre Williams

== See also ==
- List of record labels
