= Andre Williams (musician) =

American R&B singer-songwriter and record producer (1936–2019)

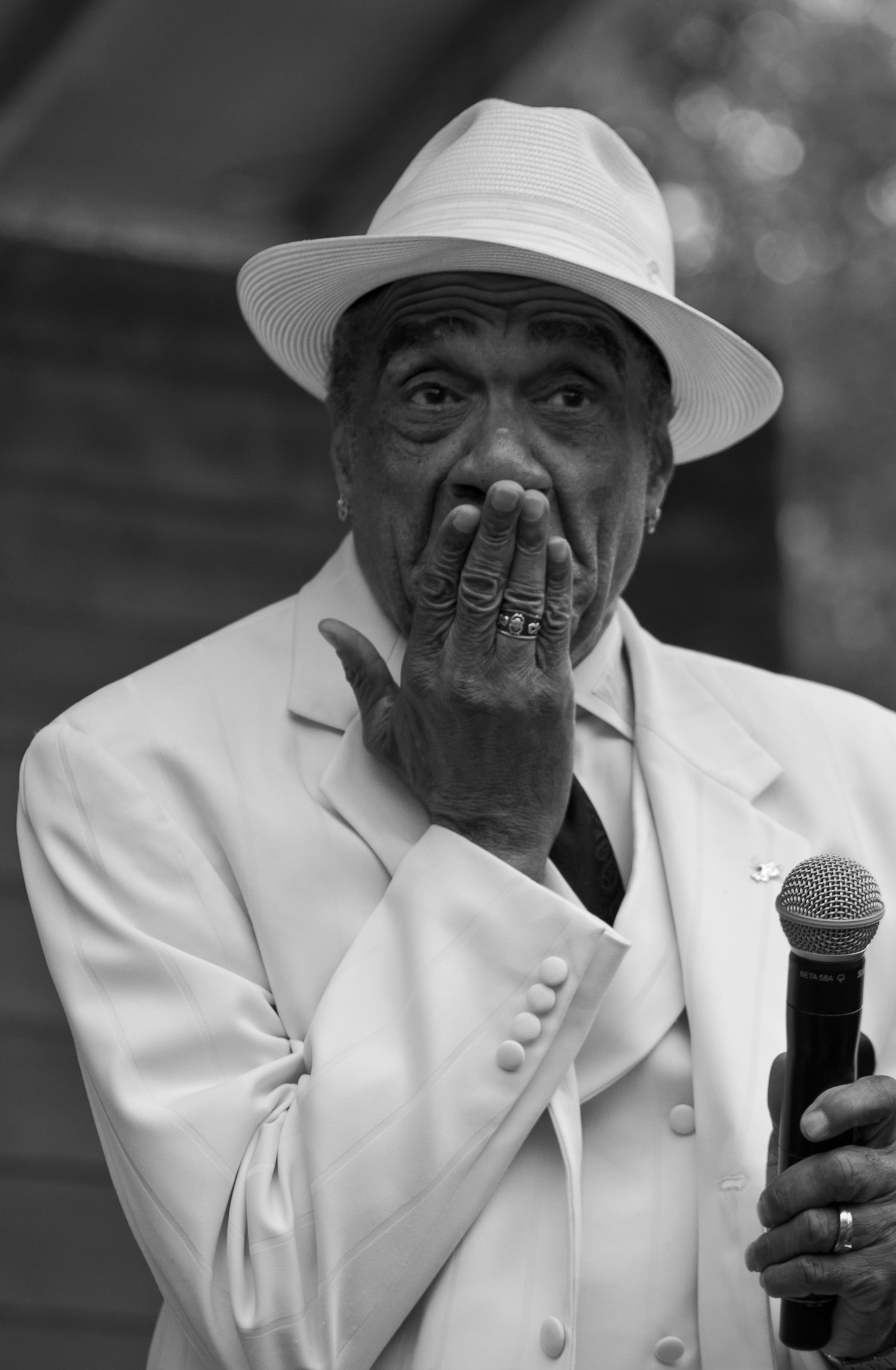
- Williams at the 2010 Chicago Blues Festival

Background information
- Born: Zephire Andre Williams; November 1, 1936; Bessemer, Alabama, U.S.
- Died: March 17, 2019 (aged 82) Chicago, Illinois, U.S.
- Genre: R&B
- Occupations: Singer, songwriter, record producer

Zephire Andre Williams (November 1, 1936 – March 17, 2019) was an American R&B musician who started his career in the 1950s at Fortune Records in Detroit. His most famous songs include the hits "Jail Bait", "Greasy Chicken", "Bacon Fat" (1957) and "Cadillac Jack" (1966). He was also the co-author of the R&B hit "Shake a Tail Feather".

== Biography ==
Born in Bessemer, Alabama, United States, Williams lived in a housing project with his mother until she died when he was six years of age. A sly and smart young boy, his "aunties" raised him until he was around 16. He then set out on his own and moved to Detroit, Michigan. There, he became friends with Jack and Devora Brown, owners of Fortune Records which was located at the back of a barber shop. Williams would become label mates with Nolan Strong and Nathaniel Mayer.

He then became lead singer for The 5 Dollars in 1955, which already had a contract with Fortune Records. Though most of the songs were billed as 'Andre Williams and the Don Juans' (on Epic in 1956 billed as 'Andre Mr Rhythm Williams and his New Group'), "Bacon Fat" and "Jail Bait" were solo efforts. "Bacon Fat" hit number 9 on the US Billboard R&B chart in 1957. "Bacon Fat" (written by Williams) was such a success that Fortune Records sold the song to Epic Records, a much larger distributor (released as Epic 5-9196 "Bacon Fat" / "Just Because of a Kiss"). In 1960, Fortune released an album of all of his singles with the Don Juans, which was titled Jail Bait (re-released in 1984). In 1960, he appeared on Motown's Miracle record label recording "Rosa Lee".

In the early 1960s, Williams co-wrote Stevie Wonder's first song, "Thank You for Loving Me". Williams's "Shake a Tail Feather" (with Otha Hayes and Verlie Rice) was also a hit in 1963 for the Five Du-Tones and then for Ike & Tina Turner plus James and Bobby Purify. Alvin Cash & the Crawlers also made a hit out of the Williams song "Twine Time". As well as these hits, Williams also supervised the making of two albums by the Contours. Additionally, in the 1960s, Williams was the manager and roadie for Edwin Starr.

In 1966, Williams released two records on the Avin Records label, then two records more on Detroit's Wingate label: "Loose Juice" and "Do It". On the Ric-Tic label in 1967, he released "You Got It and I Want It". In 1968, Williams was signed to Chess Records on Checker, Chicago's major blues label. They released many hits for Williams—"Humpin' Bumpin' and Thumpin'" and "Cadillac Jack" in particular. "Cadillac Jack" reached No. 46 on the Billboard R&B chart, his second and final chart hit. Then, he began to work with many unknown black labels and released songs such as "Sweet Little Pussy Cat" and "Rib Tips, Pts. 1 & 2" on Arvin Records. In 1968, Williams collaborated with Oliver Sain and the "Natural Bridge Bunch" to release "Pig Snoots" on Local St. Louis Label Norman and Leased to ATCO Records.a novelty song about a man named Ricky who would "come all way cross town to get me some snoots". In the 1970s, Williams wrote some songs for Parliament and Funkadelic. Williams also began to produce for Ike Turner.

Throughout the 1980s, Williams was in poverty because of his drug addictions. He lived in Chicago, Illinois; although at one point, he became homeless.

In 1996, he released Mr. Rhythm, which featured new renditions of his old tunes from the "Jail Bait" era. These included "The Greasy Chicken", "Mean Jean", and "Pass the Biscuits Please". He changed his style with 1998's Silky. In 1999, he began his relationship with Bloodshot Records by recording a country album with the Sadies, entitled Red Dirt. In 2000, Williams released The Black Godfather, with two songs backed by the Dirtbombs. In 2001 he discussed his recent conversion to Judaism and circumcision. In 2002 and 2003 he toured with the Dutch sleaze rock band, Green Hornet.

A return to soul-style music came with Aphrodisiac in 2006. "The result is a more laid-back and funky groove that's soulful but potent at the same time, fusing '70s blaxploitation sounds, Jimmy Smith-style jazz figures, and Booker T.-influenced R&B workouts into one solid package" is the way Mark Deming described the album in AllMusic.

Williams toured Europe in 2001 (with Green Hornet as backing band), 2005 and 2006 (with the Marshall Brothers). From August to November 2006, he had a short European tour, ending in Switzerland. In early 2008 he undertook a European tour with the Flash Express.

In 2007, Williams finished recording an album with the New Orleans–based band, Morning 40 Federation. The album, titled Can You Deal With It, was released by Bloodshot Records in 2008 and is credited to Andre Williams & the New Orleans Hellhounds (the pseudonymous Morning 40 Federation). The 2007 documentary Agile Mobile Hostile: A Year with Andre Williams told of Williams's early career at Fortune Records, his hard life on the streets of Chicago in the 1980s, drug and alcohol abuse, his return to the stage and recording studio in 1995, and his current life and musical career.

In 2010, Williams contributed a cover version of "The Way You Dog Me Around" for the compilation album Daddy Rockin Strong: A Tribute to Nolan Strong & The Diablos. The album was a tribute to the late Nolan Strong.

In the summer of 2010, Williams worked on an EP with the up-and-coming producer Kerry (Kerby) Moncreace, founder of Kraw Productions. Andre Williams and his longtime best friend, Ricardo "Mississippi Rick" Williams, co-wrote with Kerry Moncreace five rap songs including the urban song that tells the story of a hustler whose woman turns him into the federal government for drug trafficking, "Gangbangin'".

Williams had also been known to go by the alias "Rudibaker" or "Rutabaga", with which he would put on a different personality and speak in a gravely voice.

In 2012, Williams was inducted into the Michigan Rock and Roll Legends Hall of Fame.

Andre Williams died March 17, 2019, in Chicago, Illinois, at the age of 82.

== Selective discography ==
- 1955: "Going Down To Tia Juana"
- 1956: "Bacon Fat"
- 1957: "Jail Bait"
- 1968: "Cadillac Jack"
- 1990: Directly from the Streets
- 1994: Mr. Rhythm Is Back [compilation]
- 1996: Mr. Rhythm [compilation]
- 1996: Greasy (with the El Dorados)
- 1998: Silky
- 1999: Red Dirt (with the Sadies)
- 2000: Black Godfather
- 2000: Fat Back & Corn Liquor
- 2001: Bait and Switch
- 2003: Holland Shuffle: Live at the World Famous Vera Club (with Green Hornet)
- 2006: Aphrodisiac (with the Diplomats of Solid Sound)
- 2008: Can You Deal with It? (with the New Orleans Hellhounds)
- 2010: That's All I Need
- 2010: Gangbangin' (Kraw Productions)
- 2011: Nightclub (with the Goldstars)
- 2012: Hoods and Shades
- 2012: Life
- 2012; Night & Day (with the Sadies)
- 2012: Bacon Fat: The Fortune Singles 1956–1957 [compilation]
- 2013: Bad Motherfucker (with The Goldstars; live at The Slow Club, Freiburg, Germany)
- 2013: "Waterpipe" (spoken word contribution to the Arabicana/World Music band 'NO Blues' 5th album: Kind of NO Blues)
- 2016: I Wanna Go Back to Detroit City
