= Live Stock =

Live album by Roy Buchanan
- Released: August 11, 1975
- Recorded: November 27, 1974
- Venues: Town Hall, New York City
- Genres: Rock, blues
- Label: Polydor PD 6048
- Producer: Jay Reich Jr.

Roy Buchanan chronology
In the Beginning (1974)	Live Stock (1975)	A Street Called Straight (1976)

Live Stock is a 1975 live album by Roy Buchanan released on Polydor. The album documents a show consisting of blues standards and a few originals played in New York City, with an additional song ("I'm Evil") added from a later show in Evanston, Illinois. The cover photo was taken by Alan McDermott and sent to Roy by Australian music commentator Glenn A. Baker. Live Stock is, reportedly, one of two Buchanan albums that influenced Jeff Beck, who dedicated a song to Buchanan on his 1975 album Blow by Blow. Buchanan's last album with Polydor, it was partly made to fulfill his contractual obligations so he could move on and accept Ahmet Ertegun's offer to sign with Atlantic.

== Track listing ==
1. "Reelin' and Rockin'" (Roy Milton) - 2:21
2. "Hot Cha" (Willie Woods) - 4:02
3. "Further on Up the Road" (Bob Mack) - 3:50
4. "Roy's Bluz" (Roy Buchanan) - 8:10
5. "Can I Change My Mind" (Barry Despenza, Carl Wolfolk) - 6:32
6. "I'm a Ram" (Al Green, Mabon "Teenie" Hodges) - 4:19
7. "I'm Evil" (Roy Buchanan) - 6:19

Tracks 1–6 recorded at Town Hall, New York City, November 27, 1974; track 7 recorded at Amazingrace Coffeehouse, Evanston (IL).

== Personnel ==
- Roy Buchanan - guitar, lead vocals on "Roy's Bluz" and "I'm Evil"
- Billy Price - lead vocals
- John Harrison - bass
- Malcolm Lukens - keyboards
- Ronnie "Byrd" Foster - drums
