= Nolan Strong & the Diablos =

American, Detroit-based, R&B and doo-wop vocal group

- Also known as: The Diablos Featuring Nolan Strong
- Origin: Detroit
- Genres: R&B, doo-wop
- Labels: Fortune
- Spinoffs: Velvet Angels
- Past members: Nolan Strong; Juan Gutierrez; Willie Hunter; Quentin Eubanks; Bob "Chico" Edwards; Jimmy Strong; George Scott; Jay Johnson

Nolan Strong and the Diablos, also billed as The Diablos Featuring Nolan Strong, were an American, Detroit-based, R&B and doo-wop vocal group, best known for their songs "The Wind" and "Mind Over Matter". They had one record that spent a week on the Billboard R&B chart, "The Way You Dog Me Around", which reached no. 12 in January 1956. The group was one of the more popular pre-Motown R&B acts in Detroit during the mid-1950s, through the early 1960s. Its original members were Nolan Strong, Juan Gutierrez, Willie Hunter, Quentin Eubanks, and Bob Edwards.

The group recorded for Fortune Records, along with label-mates Andre Williams and Nathaniel Mayer. The Diablos recorded for the family-operated label in Detroit starting in 1954 until around 1964, with some of their records still being released through the 1970s.

== Nolan's biography ==
Nolan Strong was born in Scottsboro, Alabama on January 22, 1934, and moved to Detroit at a young age. He started singing soon after arriving in Detroit and formed his first Diablos group in 1950. Nolan was drafted into the U.S. Army in 1956 and was honorably discharged in 1958. Nolan Strong, the lead vocalist, had a high tenor voice. Strong's smooth voice, influenced mainly by Clyde McPhatter, was in turn a primary influence on a young Smokey Robinson.

Nolan died on February 21, 1977, at the age of 43 in Detroit. Little is known about the last years of his life.

== The Diablos' biography ==
The Diablos' 1954 song "The Wind" always has been regarded a classic among R&B and doo wop fans. The group had a unique sound, centered around the high lead tenor voice of Nolan Strong. Besides "The Wind", the Diablos were known for many songs, such as "Adios My Desert Love", "Can't We Talk This Over", "Mambo of Love", "If I", "Harriet", "I Am With You", "Goodbye Matilda", "I Wanna Know", "Beside You", "Mind Over Matter", and "The Way You Dog Me Around".

The group formed at Central High School in Detroit around 1950 and originally consisted of Strong (lead tenor), Juan Gutierrez (tenor), Willie Hunter (baritone), Quentin Eubanks (bass), and Bob "Chico" Edwards (guitar). The Diablos name is said to have come from a book, El Niño Diablo (The Devil Child), that Strong was reading for a high-school book report. In late 1953, the Diablos went into Detroit's Fortune Record Studios to cut some demo sides, with the hopes of furthering their career. Their hopes were realized even more quickly than they expected. Those demos impressed Jack and Devora Brown, owners of Fortune, who immediately signed the group to record for their label. Their first recording for Fortune was the Devora Brown-penned "Adios My Desert Love", a cha-cha influenced tune.

But it was their second Fortune record that established the group as R&B legends. Written by the group members, "The Wind" had a haunting sound, with the group chanting "blow wind" in harmony behind Strong's delicate tenor lead, and smooth and sexy talking bridge. Following the release of "The Wind", Guitierrez and Eubanks left the group, to be replaced by Nolan's brother Jimmy on tenor and George Scott on bass. Over the next two years this configuration of Diablos turned out several records, including "Route 16", "Do You Remember What You Did", "Daddy Rockin' Strong", "The Way You Dog Me Around", "You Are", and "A Teardrop From Heaven".

By late 1956, more changes occurred. Scott decided to leave the group about this time to join Hank Ballard & the Midnighters - and again the Diablos were in need of a bass.

Jay Johnson, who was introduced to Strong through fellow Fortune artist Andre Williams. Although not quite 16 at the time, Jay Johnson was already a veteran singer, having sung bass with Williams' "new" group on "Bacon Fat", "Just Because of a Kiss", "Mean Jean", and "Bobby Jean". (Williams' "new" group consisted of Gino Parks, Bobby Calhoun, Steve Gaston, and Johnson.)

Strong was impressed and the Diablos had their new bassman. Jay Johnson's first session with the Diablos was on "Can't We Talk It Over" and "Mambo of Love", recorded in late 1956 and released in 1957. By the time the first Fortune of Hits album came out, Jay Johnson had already replaced Scott with the group. Unfortunately, the picture on the album cover did not reflect this change, and shows the group with Scott instead of Johnson. This oversight may be a factor in many believing that Jay Johnson did not join the group until several years later. In fact, Johnson is heard on bass on more Diablos recordings than either Eubanks or Scott. Among these are: "Beside You", "Mind Over Matter", "Everything They Said Came True", "Welcome Baby to My Heart", "I Wanna Know", "If I Could Be With You", "Since You're Gone", "Harriet", "Harriette It's You", "I Am With You", "Are You Making a Fool Out of Me", "You're My Happiness", "Village of Love", "For Old Times Sake", "My Heart Will Always Belong to You", and "Come Home Little Girl". On "Village of Love", Johnson also provided the bass on the original Fortune version by Nathaniel Mayer & the Fabulous Twilights.

Also in late 1956, about the time Jay Johnson joined the group, Strong departed for a two-year stint in the army. While Nolan was in the service, the Diablos released one single without him, "Harriet", backed with "Come Home Little Girl", featuring Hunter on lead. Without Strong, the Diablos' magic seemed to be missing and the record received little fanfare. After Strong returned from the service, the group recorded "Harriette It's You", but there were many changes to come. Fortune was focusing more of their attention on Strong, and not the Diablos group. In 1954, records showed "The Diablos Featuring Nolan Strong". Then billing changed to "Nolan Strong & the Diablos", and by 1962, when "Mind Over Matter" was climbing the charts, the label just read "Nolan Strong", although the Diablos were on the record, as prominent as ever. This lack of recognition along with financial inequities (lack of royalties and unequal pay to the group members versus Strong), inevitably lead to the group's demise.

Just as Strong had been influenced by Clyde McPhatter, he was influential to Smokey Robinson, who was not the only one at Motown to have an appreciation for Nolan Strong & the Diablos. Berry Gordy had wanted to bring the Diablos into his fast-growing Motown complex. The deal never was finalised. The group disbanded by 1964, with a few more record releases and reissues the following years.

Jimmy Strong died on January 29, 1970, at age 34. Edwards died March 17, 2001, at age 63. All other members, with the exception of Johnson, are also deceased.

== Velvet Angels ==
By the later part of 1963, as the Diablos were dissolving, the Velvet Angels were forming. The group included Diablos alumni Jay Johnson and Willie Hunter along with Bobby Calhoun (baritone) and Cy Iverson (tenor). Iverson had gone to high school with Johnson, and Bobby Calhoun had recorded with Johnson as part of Williams' "new" group on Fortune. They were inspired by groups like the Mills Brothers and Ink Spots.

The Velvet Angels performed at clubs around Detroit and across the border in Canada and soon traveled to New Jersey in search a deal and shows. Soon after setting up residence in Jersey City, New Jersey, they found an advertisement for a talent show in the local paper. They performed at the show and won. Frank Sheldon, the show sponsor and owner of the Tender Trap club in Fairview, New Jersey, was looking for this type of group. The Velvet Angels were talented and versatile doing a mix of R&B, pop, gospel, and soul music, and doing them all a cappella. Things were starting to happen for the Velvet Angels; they were hired to do commercials for Lionel Trains, but their manager became ill and that deal fell apart.

== Nolan briefly joins the Velvet Angels ==
Nolan Strong had remained on good terms with Hunter and Johnson and had talked about reuniting with them. Sometime during 1963, Strong came to New Jersey and spent some time with the group, rehearsing and appearing with them at the Tender Trap. Some of the rehearsal sessions at their hotel (the Madison Hotel in Jersey City, New Jersey) were recorded on a basic home tape recorder. Angelo Pompeo made the acquaintance of some of the group members and eventually purchased some of the rehearsal tapes. Johnson was not there at the time of the "deal", nor aware of it until after the fact. The tapes soon found their way to Eddie Gries, who issued some of the tunes as singles on his Medieval label.

In 1964 "I'm in Love" b/w "Let Me Come Back" was issued as Medieval 201. Both sides highlighted the bass work of Johnson, with a bass lead on "Let Me Come Back", and the driving bass on "I'm in Love" (also released as Co-Op 201). Medieval credits "Strong" as the writer while the Co-Op version credits "Calhoun-Hunter-Johnson-Iverson". Strong is heard on these tapes but mostly as a background singer, although he did lead vocal on "Fools Rush In". More Velvet Angels material was released later through Gries on the Relic Best of Acapella series, as well as his Acappella Showcase Presents the Velvet Angels LP, also on Relic. The picture of the Velvet Angels that appeared on the Relic Velvet Angels album incorrectly identifies Johnson (third from left) as Strong.

They disbanded the same year their singles were released. Calhoun indicates he went south and did some work with Stax Records. Iverson and Hunter returned to Detroit. Jay Johnson stayed on for a time in New Jersey, continuing to perform solo at the Tender Trap, but also found his way back to Detroit. Upon his return, he joined Detroit's Five Monarchs, but did not record with them. In the late 1960s Johnson formed the soul group the Four Sonics, releasing two singles in 1968 on Detroit's Sport label. The group recorded through the mid-1970s.

== Legacy ==
Strong has also been an influence on rock and roll bands. In December 2009, Lou Reed of the Velvet Underground told Rolling Stone editor David Fricke: "If I could really sing, I'd be Nolan Strong" during an interview at the New York Public Library. In a 2008 interview with Goldmine, Smokey Robinson said: "There was a guy who lived in Detroit and had a group called the Diablos. His name was Nolan Strong. They were my favorite vocalists at that time."

The Diablos were inducted into the United In Group Harmony Hall of Fame in 2003. In March 2008 the group was inducted into the Doo-Wop Hall of Fame of America.

In 2007, the Metro Times listed "The Wind" at #11 in The 100 Greatest Detroit Songs list, which was the November 11 cover story.

In September 2010 Daddy Rockin' Strong: A Tribute to Nolan Strong & the Diablos, an LP, was released by The Wind Records, with distribution by Norton Records. The album features 13 new Diablos covers by a cast of rock and roll, punk and garage rock bands. It features the Dirtbombs, Reigning Sound, Demon's Claws, Wreckless Eric & Amy Rigby and Mark Sultan, among others.

Jay Johnson, the last surviving member of the Diablos, formed a new Diablos group in 2007 with vocalists: Bobby Turk, Art Howard, Mike Clark. The group, billed as "Nolan Strong's Diablos", is presently active in the United States.

== Discography ==
All releases are on the Fortune Records label, Detroit, Michigan, unless otherwise noted.

=== Nolan Strong & the Diablos ===
Year	Release	Title	Notes
1954	509/510	"Adios, My Desert Love" / "(I Want) An Old Fashioned Girl"	Each side of the release had a different number
1954	511	"The Wind" / "Baby, Be Mine"	
1955	514	"Route 16" / "Hold Me Until Eternity"	
1955	516	"Daddy Rockin' Strong" / "Do You Remember What You Did"	
1955	518	"The Way You Dog Me Around" / "Jump, Shake And Move"	
1956	519	"You're The Only Girl, Dolores" / "You Are"	
1956	522	"A Teardrop From Heaven" / "Try Me One More Time"	
1957	525	"The Mambo Of Love" / "Can't We Talk This Over"	This was put together from previous recorded sessions
1958	841	"Harriet" / "Come Home, Little Girl"	Recorded without Nolan Strong
1958	529	"For Old Times Sake" / "My Heart Will Always Belong To You"	
1959	531	"Goodbye, Matilda" / "I Am With You" *	* Their cover of a 1951 recording by the Dominoes on Federal 12039.
1959	532	"If I (Could Be With You Tonight)" / "I Wanna Know"	
1960	536	"Since You've Gone" / "Are You Gonna Do" **	** B-side is their cover of The Drifters' "What'cha Gonna Do" under a slightly different title.
1962	544	"I Don't Care" / "Blue Moon"	
1963	553	"I Really Love You" / "Everything They Said Came True"	There is also a release # 553 by Nolan Strong with a different B-side
1964	563	"Village Of Love" / "(I'm In Love) Real True Love"	
1964	564	"Are You Making A Fool Out Of Me" / "I Want To Be Your Happiness"	Backed by Tony Valla & the Alamos
1964	574	"The Way You Dog Me Around" / "Jump With Me"	
1974	Pyramid 159	"White Christmas" / "Danny Boy"	
1974	Pyramid 160	"The Masquerade Is Over" / "Harriette, It's You"	

Nolan Strong

Year	Release	Title	Notes
1962	546	"Mind Over Matter (I'm Gonna Make You Mine)" / "Beside You"	
1963	553	"I Really Love You" / "You're My Love"	There is also a release # 553 by the Diablos with a different B-side
1963	556	"(Yeah, Baby) It's Because Of You" / "You're Every Beat Of My Heart"	
1964	569	"(What Did That Genie Mean When He Said) Ali Coochie" / "(You're Not Good Looking, But) You're Presentable"	

The Velvet Angels

Members: Nolan Strong, Bob Calhoun, Cy Iverson, Willie Hunter and J. W. Johnson

Year	Release	Title	Notes
1964	Medieval 201	"I'm in Love" / "Let Me Come Back"	
1964	Medieval 207	"Since You've Been Gone" / "Baby I Wanna Know"	
