= Joe Von Battle =

American record producer (1915–1973)

- Born: Joseph Battle; April 3, 1915; Macon, Georgia, U.S.
- Died: March 27, 1973 (aged 57) Detroit, Michigan, U.S.
- Genres: Gospel, blues, jazz
- Occupations: Record shop owner, record label executive, record producer
- Years active: 1945–1967
- Labels: J.V.B., Battle, Von

Joe Von Battle (born Joseph Battle, April 3, 1915 – March 27, 1973) was an American record store owner and pioneer black record producer in Detroit, Michigan, between the 1940s and 1960s. He set up the J.V.B. and Battle record labels, was one of the first independent black record producers, the first to record Rev. C. L. Franklin and his daughter Aretha Franklin, and influential in the career of John Lee Hooker and other blues musicians.

== Life and career ==
Battle was born in Macon, Georgia, and trained as a licensed minister of the African Methodist Episcopal Church. He took the name "Von" – which he used as a middle name rather than as part of his surname – from a childhood liking for the films of Erich Von Stroheim; later, he retained it as he felt it gave his name elegance, and encouraged businesses with whom he dealt to think that he was of European rather than African-American descent. He married and had four children before moving to Detroit in the 1930s; he later remarried and had four more children. After being placed for several months in quarantine for suspected tuberculosis, he lost faith in the church while retaining a love of gospel music, and turned to paid employment. He held various jobs in utilities and in the automotive industry, and moved with his family into the Brewster Project near Hastings Street in Detroit.

In 1945, he took up an offer to run a general store at 3530 Hastings Street, and began selling records there from his own collection. As it expanded, the store became Joe's Records, and by the late 1940s he had an inventory of 35,000 records. Battle acquired recording equipment which he set up at the back of the store with a piano, and could also take around local churches. One of his earliest recordings was “Hastings Street Opera”, recorded by "Detroit Count" (Bob White, c.1920–1970). He also established contacts and set up distribution arrangements with other labels, notably Chess Records in Chicago, DeLuxe Records in Cincinnati, and Savoy Records in Newark, who released saxophonist Paul Williams' first hit in 1948, "Thirty-Five Thirty", which took its title from Battle's store address.

Battle set up his own record label, J.V.B. Records, in 1948. He recorded the preaching and singing of Rev. C. L. Franklin and his congregations at the nearby New Bethel Baptist Church. In all, he recorded and released some 75 records by Franklin, and in 1957 was the first to record Franklin's fourteen-year-old daughter, Aretha, on the gospel song "Never Grow Old". He also set up other record labels, including Battle and Von, and recorded many of the blues musicians who frequented Hastings Street, including John Lee Hooker, Baby Boy Warren, Louisiana Red, Washboard Willie, Little Sonny, Eddie Burns, Joe Weaver, Memphis Slim, One String Sam, and Little Willie John; gospel singers including Brother Will Hairston; and jazz guitarist Kenny Burrell. He was known for sometimes recording rehearsals without informing the musicians, later releasing the results. He also produced his own radio show which was broadcast from CKLW in Windsor, Ontario.

By the mid 1950s Joe's Records was a focal point of the Black Bottom community, a popular meeting place for black entertainers, and the location of a notable photograph of John Lee Hooker with guitar in hand, taken by French blues historian Jacques Demêtre and used on several later compilation albums. Regular customers at the store included Berry Gordy, Wilson Pickett, Jackie Wilson, and many of the musicians who later worked for Motown, although Battle himself disliked the commercialized music that they subsequently produced. In 1960, Hastings Street and its properties were demolished to make way for the Chrysler Freeway, and Battle relocated his store to 12th Street on the West Side of Detroit, where he continued to record and produce blues and gospel musicians through to about 1966, by which time his recordings were released through Riverside Records.

Battle became ill with what was eventually diagnosed as Addison's disease, and also increasingly suffered from chronic alcoholism. In 1967, his store was caught up in the violent rioting that overtook the area, and it and its stock were largely destroyed. He died in 1973, aged 57, from the combined effects of his illnesses.
