= Calvin Frazier =

American guitarist, singer and songwriter (1915–1972)

- Born: Calvin H. Frazier; February 16, 1915; Osceola, Arkansas, United States
- Died: September 23, 1972 (aged 57) Detroit, Michigan, United States
- Genres: Detroit blues, country blues
- Occupations: Guitarist, singer, songwriter
- Instruments: Guitar, vocals
- Years active: 1930–1972
- Label: Various

Calvin H. Frazier (February 16, 1915 – September 23, 1972) was an American Detroit blues and country blues guitarist, singer and songwriter. Despite leaving a fragmented recording history, both as a singer and guitarist, Frazier was an associate of Robert Johnson, and recorded alongside Johnny Shines, Sampson Pittman, T. J. Fowler, Alberta Adams, Jimmy Milner, Baby Boy Warren, Boogie Woogie Red, and latterly Washboard Willie. His early work was recorded by the Library of Congress (now preserved by the National Recording Registry) prior to the outbreak of World War II, although his more commercial period took place between 1949 and 1956.

== Biography ==
Frazier was born in Osceola, Arkansas. He initially performed with his brothers. Befriending Johnny Shines, in 1930 they travelled together to Helena, Arkansas, where they met Robert Johnson. The trio moved on to Detroit, Michigan, with Frazier bringing his wife, Gussie Mae, and their children. Here they performed hymns on local radio stations. Frazier and Johnson returned to the South, where they performed with the drummer James "Peck" Curtis.

In 1935, Frazier was involved in a dispute in Memphis, Tennessee, in which he was wounded and his only brother, along with another man, were shot dead. Frazier returned to Detroit with his wife, but then wed Shines's cousin in an invalid marriage. He played guitar as an accompanist for Big Maceo Merriweather, Sonny Boy Williamson II and Baby Boy Warren. He was recorded in 1938 by the folklorist Alan Lomax for the Library of Congress. His recordings include "Lily Mae" (dedicated to his wife), a revision of Johnson's "Honeymoon Blues", and "Highway 51", a variant of Johnson's "Dust My Broom".

His unique style combined slide guitar playing with unusual lyrics and vocal phrasing that is difficult to decipher. He released three singles under his own name in 1949 and 1951 on the Alben and New Song labels, including "Got Nobody to Tell My Troubles To", which he recorded in Toledo, Ohio, in 1951. From 1951 to 1953, Frazier was a recording member of T. J. Fowler's jump blues combo. He then recorded with Warren in 1954. His final sessions in the studio appear to have been in 1956, backing Washboard Willie. Without any tangible success on records or otherwise, Frazier nevertheless performed around Detroit, taking his youngest daughter Carol Frazier along on his engagements until his death.

Frazier died of cancer in September 1972, at the age of 57, in Detroit.

His most notable work is "This Old World's in a Tangle", the first song he recorded; a compilation album of the same title was issued by Laurie Records in 1993, which includes some of his earliest work. Nine of his full-length original recordings are included in the compilation Detroit Blues: Blues from the Motor City 1938–1954, released by JSP Records in 2005.

In 2009, the Detroit Blues Society led an appeal to raise money to mark Frazier's previously unmarked grave with a headstone. By December of that year a granite slab was in place.

== Compilation album ==
- This Old World's in a Tangle (1993), Laurie Records

== See also ==
- List of Detroit blues musicians
