= Johnny Mars =

American singer

- Born: December 7, 1942 (age 83); Laurens, South Carolina, United States
- Genres: Electric blues
- Occupations: Harmonicist, singer, songwriter
- Instruments: Harmonica, vocals
- Years active: Early 1960s–present
- Label: Various
- Website: www.johnnymars.com

Johnny Mars (born December 7, 1942) is an American electric blues harmonica player, singer, and songwriter. Over a long career, he has worked with Magic Sam, Earl Hooker, B.B. King, Jimi Hendrix, Jesse Fuller, Spencer Davis, Ian Gillan, Do-Re-Mi, Bananarama and Michael Roach.

== Biography ==
Mars was born in Laurens, South Carolina, to sharecropping parents. His family regularly moved house when Mars was a youngster, but at the age of nine, he was presented with his first harmonica. When he was aged fourteen, and on the death of his mother, Mars and his younger siblings moved to New Paltz, New York, and having left high school, Mars began playing in various clubs in New York City.

He signed a recording contract with Mercury Records, while a member of the band Burning Bush, and they recorded several sides with the label. By the middle of the 1960s, Mars had moved to California, and formed the Johnny Mars Band, which found work but no recognition beyond their base in North California.

However, they toured with Magic Sam and played on the same bill as Earl Hooker, B.B. King and Jesse Fuller. After advice from Rick Estrin (Little Charlie & the Nightcats), Mars toured the United Kingdom in 1972, and subsequently recorded two albums there for Big Bear Records before relocating to Somerset in 1978. He worked with the record producer Ray Fenwick plus Spencer Davis and Ian Gillan. His album of 1984, Life on Mars, received critical acclaim.

In 1988, Mars was a guest musician on the album by Do-Re-Mi, The Happiest Place in Town. He later worked with Bananarama on "Preacher Man" (1990) and their 1991 cover version of "Long Train Running", appearing in the group's music video for the former track. Mars also taught for fifteen years in primary schools in England, and worked with teenagers in music projects. He continued touring across the United Kingdom and Europe, where he had a strong fan base.

In 1992, Mars played at the San Francisco Blues Festival. In 1999, he released the album Stateside. On My Mind followed in 2003. In 2003 and 2004, he played with the Barrelhouse Blues Orchestra. More recently, Mars teamed up with the blues guitarist Michael Roach and in 2008, he appeared at the Bath Music Festival in the United Kingdom, The Pocono Blues Festival (United States) and the Kastav Blues Festival (Croatia). In January 2010, the pair toured the Middle East.

== Discography ==
Year	Title	Record label
1972	Blues from Mars	Polydor (under licence from Big Bear)
1976	Oakland Boogie	Big Bear
1980	Mighty Mars	JSP
1984	Life on Mars	Beat Goes On
1994	King of the Blues Harp	JSP
1999	Stateside	MM&K
2003	On My Mind	Springboard Productions

== See also ==
- List of electric blues musicians
- List of harmonica blues musicians
