= Adultery (song) =

Single by Do-Ré-Mi

from the album The Happiest Place in Town
- Released: October 1987
- Recorded: 1987
- Genre: Rock; pop
- Label: Virgin

Do-Ré-Mi singles chronology
"Guns and Butter" (1986)	"Adultery" (1987)	"King of Moomba" (1988)

Adultery is a song by Australian rock/pop group Do-Ré-Mi, released by Virgin Records in October 1987, as the lead single from the band's second studio album, The Happiest Place in Town. The song peaked at number 27 on the Australian charts.

The single has five tracks, which were written by lead vocalist Deborah Conway, drummer Dorland Bray, bass guitarist Helen Carter and guitarist Stephen Philip. Three of these has been released as previous singles.

== Track listing ==
1. "Adultery" (Bray, Carter, Philip)
2. "Deep Blue Sea"
3. "Guns and Butter"
4. "Idiot Grin"
5. "Warnings Moving Clockwise"

== Charts ==
Chart (1987)	Peak position
Australia (Kent Music Report)	27

== Personnel ==
Do-Ré-Mi members

- Dorland Bray — drums, percussion, backing vocals
- Helen Carter — bass guitar, backing vocals
- Deborah Conway — lead vocalist
- Stephen Philip — guitar

Additional musicians

- Roger Freeman — trombone
- Steve Hogarth — keyboards

Recording details

- Producer, engineer — Gavin MacKillop
  - Assistant engineer — Chris Potter, Mike Bigwood, Steve Chase
- Studio — Townhouse III Studios London
  - Mixing studio — Maison Rouge Studios London, Genetic Studios Reading
