= Detroit blues =

Form of blues music indigenous to Detroit, Michigan

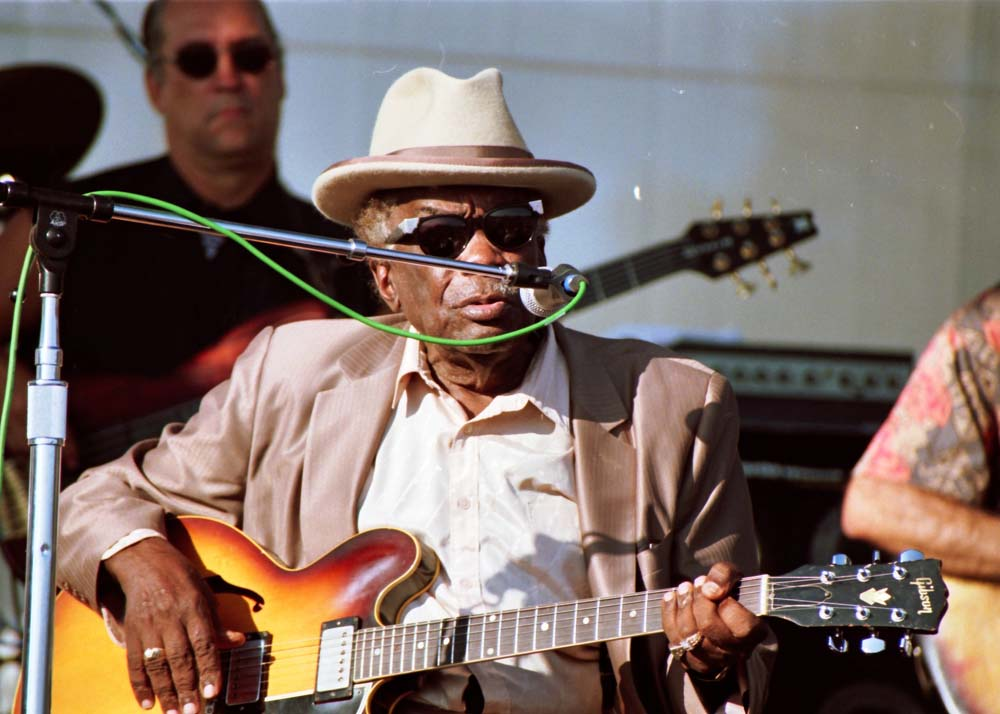
- John Lee Hooker in 1997
- Stylistic origins: Delta blues
- Cultural origins: Early 20th century, Detroit, United States
- Typical instruments: Electric guitar; harmonica; drums; piano; bass guitar; saxophone

Detroit blues is blues music played by musicians residing in and around Detroit, Michigan, particularly in the 1940s and 1950s. Detroit blues originated when Delta blues performers migrated north from the Mississippi Delta and Memphis, Tennessee, to work in industrial plants in Detroit in the 1920s and 1930s. Typical Detroit blues is similar in style to Chicago blues. Its sound is distinguished from Delta blues by the use of electric amplified instruments and more varied instrumentation, including the bass guitar and piano.

The only Detroit blues performer to achieve national fame was John Lee Hooker, as record companies and promoters have tended to ignore the Detroit scene in favor of the larger, more influential Chicago blues. The Detroit scene was centered on the Black Bottom neighborhood.

== Detroit blues musicians ==
- Alberta Adams
- Johnnie Bassett
- Eddie "Guitar" Burns
- The Butler Twins
- Thornetta Davis
- Calvin Frazier
- L.C. Green
- John Lee Hooker
- Bobo Jenkins
- Robert Penn
- Boogie Woogie Red
- Doctor Ross
- Harmonica Shah
- Little Sonny
- Nolan Strong & The Diablos
- Baby Boy Warren
- Willie D. Warren
- Joe Weaver
- Washboard Willie
- Detroit Gary Wiggins

== See also ==
- List of blues musicians
- Music of Detroit
