= King of Moomba =

King of Moomba may refer to:

- King of Moomba, awarded at the Moomba festival
- "King of Moomba" (song), a single by Do-Ré-Mi
