= Unitar (disambiguation) =

A unitar is a one-stringed guitar.

UNITAR may also refer to:

- United Nations Institute for Training and Research
- Universiti Tun Abdul Razak, an institution of tertiary education in Malaysia

== See also ==
- Ektara, a type of Indian unitar
