= One String Sam =

American singer

- Born: Sam Wilson
- Genre: Detroit blues
- Occupations: Singer, diddley bow player
- Instruments: Vocals, diddley bow
- Years active: 1956–1974

Sam Wilson, known as One String Sam, was an American Detroit blues musician, who specialised in playing the diddley bow. Details of his life are scant, but he recorded two tracks described as an "eerie, spooky, and riveting version of country blues". He also performed at the 1973 and 1974 Ann Arbor Blues and Jazz Festivals.

== Biography ==
Little is known of the life of One String Sam, apart from his limited recording and concert performances. He was largely a street entertainer, based in Detroit, Michigan. In the same city, Joe's Record Shop was founded in 1945 and then based on 3530 Hastings Street. It was owned by Joe Von Battle, and he sold records and recorded music with such as John Lee Hooker, C. L. Franklin and Aretha Franklin. One day, in 1956, One String Sam entered the shop and, with Battle's assistance, he recorded two distinctive tracks. These were "I Need a Hundred Dollars" and "My Baby, Oooo." Sam accompanied his singing by playing a home-made diddley bow. The musical instrument had an electric guitar pickup fitted and Sam played the fretless, one string instrument utilising an empty baby food jar as a slide. One String Sam used the open jar as a makeshift echo chamber when vocalising into the recording microphone. AllMusic noted that the two tracks presented "an eerie, spooky, and riveting version of country blues". The two sides were issued on a 10" shellac disc on Battle's own J-V-B Recordings record label. In August 2014, a vinyl copy of the original single was sold at an online auction for $1922.

After the recording was completed, One String Sam returned to playing on Detroit's streets for a number of years. His eventual absence from doing so was noted, although it was subsequently discovered that he had relocated to Inkster, Michigan.

In 1973, One String Sam was persuaded to perform at the Ann Arbor Blues and Jazz Festival. He was recorded performing two tracks, "I Need a Hundred Dollars" and "I Got to Go." These two sides were released on Please Mr. Foreman - Motor City Blues: Ann Arbor Blues & Jazz Festival 1973, on Schoolkids' Records.

There are sources which suggest that One String Sam also performed at the Festival the following year. The peculiarity was that it was staged at the campus of St. Clair College in Windsor, Ontario, Canada, due to problems in obtaining the necessary permit in Ann Arbor itself. The Ann Arbor Sun reported in September 1974, that One String Sam's presence was his second appearance at the Festival. After this, details of One String Sam's ongoing existence are not recorded.

The documentary Sam Wilson One String Sam - The lasting echo of a single string, claimed that the song "My Baby, Oooo," was not an original of Sam's but merely Sam's one string version of the song "My Babe" which was written by Willie Dixon for Little Walter, who recorded and released it in 1955. The documentary also disclosed previously unknown performances and information regarding Sam's ex-wife and two children. The film was created using research gathered over an eight year period by folk instrument historian and author of The Folk Art Instrument Builders Reference, Charles E. Atchison.

== Live performances ==
Event	Date	Venue
Ann Arbor Blues and Jazz Festival	September 8, 1973	Otis Spann Memorial Field, Ann Arbor, Michigan, United States
B. B. King (One String Sam was support act)	October 19, 1973	Hill Auditorium, Ann Arbor, Michigan, United States
One String Sam	October 30, 1973	Primo Showbar, Ann Arbor, Michigan, United States
One String Sam	March 19, 1974	Primo Showbar, Ann Arbor, Michigan, United States
1st Annual CMU Jazz Festival	March 24, 1974	Warriner Hall, Central Michigan University, Mount Pleasant, Michigan, United States
Blues Extravaganza	April 5, 1974	Toledo Sports Arena, Toledo, Ohio, United States
Ann Arbor Blues and Jazz Festival	September 8, 1974	Griffin Hollow Amphitheatre, Windsor, Ontario, Canada

== Discography ==
=== Single ===
Year	A-side	B-side	Record type	Label
1956	"My Baby, Oooo"	"I Need A Hundred Dollars"	Shellac, 10"	J-V-B Recordings (J-V-B 40)

=== Compilation album appearances ===
Year	Title	Label	Tracks
1973	Please Mr. Foreman - Motor City Blues: Ann Arbor Blues & Jazz Festival 1973	Schoolkids Records	studio versions of "I Need A Hundred Dollars" and "My Baby, Oooo".
1995	Rural Blues Vol 1 (1934-1956)	Document Records	studio versions of "I Need A Hundred Dollars" and "My Baby, Oooo".
1998	Motor City Blues	Total Energy	contains live recordings of "I Need a Hundred Dollars" and "I Got to Go".
2010	One String Blues Masters	DeltaCat	five tracks by Sam including "My Baby, Oooo", "Walk With Me Lord", two versions of "I Need A Hundred Dollars" and "I Got To Go".

== See also ==
- List of Detroit blues musicians
