= Brother Will Hairston =

- Birth name: Will Hairston
- Born: November 22, 1919; Brookfield, Mississippi, U.S.
- Died: March 17, 1988 (aged 68); Detroit, Michigan, U.S.
- Genres: Gospel music
- Occupation(s): Singer, songwriter, preacher
- Years active: 1955–1972
- Labels: J.V.B., Knowles
- Formerly of: Washboard Willie

Brother Will Hairston (November 22, 1919 – March 17, 1988) was an American gospel singer and preacher in Detroit, Michigan, called "The Hurricane of the Motor City" and known for his "startlingly socially conscious" songs of protest in the 1950s and 1960s during the Civil Rights Movement.

== Biography ==
Will Hairston was born into a poor farming family in Brookfield, Mississippi, and went to school in the town of Centreville. After both his parents died, he moved to St. Louis and was drafted into the US Army Air Force during World War II. Once the war ended, he married, and moved with his wife to Detroit where he worked in the Chrysler factory on 8 Mile Road. He was a member of the Church of Christ, and made his first recordings for the church in 1955, credited as Brother Will Hairston. His first record was "My God Don't Like It", subsequently re-titled "The Death of Emmet Teal" [sic], commenting on the lynching of fourteen-year-old Emmett Till in Mississippi in August 1955.

On later records, Hairston was credited as "The Hurricane of the Motor City", an epithet deriving from a time when, he said: "I was singing spirituals at a church once where the pews were not stationary. After a couple of selections some of the members got happy and began to shout. When the service was over someone mentioned that the church looked as if a hurricane had been through it. The subtitle has stuck since then."

In 1956, Hairston wrote and recorded "The Alabama Bus" for Detroit record store owner Joe Von Battle's J.V.B. label. With Washboard Willie on percussion, the song describes and chronicles the Montgomery bus boycott that followed Rosa Parks' refusal to give up her seat to a white man. Hairston's recording, described as "emotional" and "gripping", was the first to reference by name Rev. Martin Luther King Jr. The following year, Hairston recorded "Shout School Children", which chronicled the enrollment of nine children at Little Rock Central High School, and subsequent events including the delayed intervention of President Eisenhower. The recording and his later releases were issued on the Knowles record label in Detroit, and were personally sold by Hairston himself.

Hairston returned to the recording studio in 1964, releasing "The Story of President Kennedy", for which he received an appreciative acknowledgement from Jacqueline Kennedy. The following year, in support of the Selma to Montgomery marches, he recorded "March On To Montgomery", again with Washboard Willie and piano accompaniment by Louise Jackson. In 1968 he recorded "The War in Vietnam", and – after the assassination of Martin Luther King Jr. – "Rev. King Had A Time".

Hairston retired from Chrysler on disability grounds in 1970. In December 1971, he was shot and seriously injured by a white man, but recovered. His final recordings in 1972, with a gospel choir, included "Death Knocked At My Door, Jesus Got the Key", "This May Be My Last Time", and "Minny, Your Dress Too Short", a protestation against miniskirts. Many of his recordings were issued on an LP, Brother Will Hairston: Hurricane of the Motor City.

He died in 1988, aged 68. He was survived by his widow, and eight of their ten children.
