= Bobo Jenkins =

American singer (1916–1984)

- Born: John Pickens Jenkins; January 7, 1916; Forkland, Alabama, United States
- Died: August 14, 1984 (aged 68) Detroit, Michigan, United States
- Genres: Detroit blues, electric blues
- Occupations: Guitarist, singer, songwriter, record label owner
- Instruments: Guitar, vocals
- Years active: 1952–1984
- Labels: Big Star Records, various

Bobo Jenkins (January 7, 1916 – August 14, 1984) was an American Detroit blues and electric blues guitarist, singer and songwriter. He also built and set up his own recording studio and record label in Detroit. Jenkins is best known for his recordings of "Democrat Blues" and "Tell Me Where You Stayed Last Night".

== Biography ==
He was born John Pickens Jenkins in Forkland, Alabama. His father, a sharecropper, died when John was not yet one year old, and the boy grew up with his mother and uncle. He left home before the age of 12, and arrived in Memphis, Tennessee. He had a wife at the age of 14, the first of ten marriages. Jenkins took casual work in the Mississippi Delta for several years and then enrolled in the United States Army. Following his 1944 military discharge, he relocated to Detroit, working for Packard and managing a garage, before spending 27 years working for Chrysler.

In the late 1940s Jenkins learned to play the guitar and started writing songs. He wrote the politically themed "Democrat Blues", about the U.S. Election Day in 1952, expressing his unease about Dwight D. Eisenhower becoming the first Republican in the White House in almost 20 years.

With assistance from John Lee Hooker, Jenkins recorded "Democrat Blues" in Chicago in 1954, which was released by Chess Records. Another recording was issued by Boxer Records, based in Chicago, and then "Ten Below Zero" (1957) was released by Fortune Records, based in Detroit. In 1959, Jenkins established his own record label, Big Star Records, whose first release was his single "You"ll Never Understand" and "Tell Me Where You Stayed Last Night". He met and played alongside Sonny Boy Williamson II, before constructing his own recording studio. He recorded mainly local musicians, including James "Little Daddy" Walton, Little Junior Cannady, Chubby Martin and Syl Foreman.

Jenkins went on to promote the first Detroit Blues Festival, in 1972. His first album, The Life of Bobo Jenkins, was issued in the same year. It became known as the "red album", from the color of the record sleeve, which included a photograph of a younger Jenkins – who was then 56 years old – within a star shape. This was a tie-in with the Big Star Records name. Jenkins was one of the headline acts in the Detroit blues review part of the 1973 Ann Arbor Blues and Jazz Festival. Recordings from the festival were released by Schoolkids Records in 1995, including two tracks by Jenkins. In 1974, Jenkins wrote another song with political overtones, "Watergate Blues," which was included on his next album, Here I Am a Fool in Love Again. The cover design was the same as that of the previous release, but with a change in color, and the album became known as the "green album". The session musicians included artists based in Ann Arbor, such as Sarah Brown, Fran Christina and Steve Nardella. In 1976 Jenkins performed at the Smithsonian Institution, as part of the celebrations marking the United States Bicentennial.

Detroit All Purpose Blues – the "yellow album" – was issued in 1977, with accompaniment by Detroit-based blues musicians, including Buddy Folks and Willie D. Warren.

In 1982, Jenkins went to Europe with the American Living Blues Festival tour, but because of poor health he returned home after his first concert.

Jenkins died in Detroit after a long illness in August 1984, at the age of 68. In 2018 the Killer Blues Headstone Project placed the headstone for him at the Detroit Memorial Cemetery in Detroit.

== Discography ==
=== Albums ===
- The Life of Bobo Jenkins (1972), Big Star
- Here I Am a Fool in Love Again (1974), Big Star
- Detroit All Purpose Blues (1977), Big Star
- The Life of Bobo Jenkins (2003), P-Vine (reissue)
- My All New Life Story (2021), Third Man Records

=== Compilation albums ===
- Motor City Blues (1973)

== See also ==
- List of Detroit blues musicians
- List of electric blues musicians

== Quotation ==
I was workin' out to Chrysler and I sat down at the end of the line and wrote that song, The whirrin' of the machines gives me the beat. It's like listening to a band play all day. Every song I ever wrote that's any good came to me on the assembly line.

— Bobo Jenkins
