= Doctor Ross =

American singer-songwriter

- Ross in 1965

Background information
- Also known as: The Harmonica Boss
- Born: Charles Isaiah Ross; October 21, 1925; Tunica, Mississippi, U.S.
- Origin: Flint, Michigan, U.S.
- Died: May 28, 1993 (aged 67) Flint, Michigan, U.S.
- Genres: Blues; Detroit blues; Delta blues
- Occupations: Musician; songwriter
- Instruments: Vocals; harmonica; guitar; drums
- Years active: 1942–1993
- Labels: Chess; Sun; Fortune; Testament; Blue Horizon; Big Bear; Ornament

Isaiah Ross (October 21, 1925 – May 28, 1993), known as Doctor Ross, was an American blues musician who usually performed as a one-man band, simultaneously singing and playing guitar, harmonica, and drums. Ross's primal style has been compared to John Lee Hooker, Blind Boy Fuller and Sonny Boy Williamson I.

== Early life ==
Charles Isaiah Ross was born on October 21, 1925, in the Mississippi Delta town of Tunica, Mississippi, one of eleven children in a farming family of mixed African-American and Native American heritage. His first instrument was the harmonica, which he learned to play at age nine. Ross served in the United States Army from 1943 to 1948 in the Pacific Theater, and again from 1950 to 1951. He married shortly after leaving the army. During his service, Ross had accrued a collection of army medical books which, along with his habit of carrying his harmonicas in a doctor's bag, earned him the nickname "Doctor Ross."

== Career ==
Ross made his professional debut in 1942 at the age of seventeen, broadcasting on the radio station KFFA in Helena, Arkansas. Ross regularly played parties and appeared on WROX and WDIA after his army service. In late 1951, Ross recorded his first 78 RPM record, "Country Clown," produced by Sam Phillips in Memphis and issued on the nascent Chess label. Ross would issue two more singles recorded with Phillips, both on Phillips' own Sun Records label, in 1953 and 1954.

In October 1954, Ross moved his family to Flint, Michigan, and began working at a General Motors factory. This employment, which Ross held for the rest of his life, afforded him a comfortable middle-class lifestyle. In 1958, Ross recorded "Industrial Boogie," a Flint-centric take on "Boogie Chillen'" by John Lee Hooker, released on his own DIR imprint. From 1960 to 1963, Detroit-based Fortune Records released four singles by Ross, including 1961's "Cat Squirrel," which later brought Ross to the attention of rock audiences when the song was covered on the debut albums of both Cream and Jethro Tull. Following his Fortune singles, which were recorded with accompanists, Ross began recording most of his songs solo, providing vocals, guitar, hi-hat and bass drum played with foot pedals, and harmonica with a neck rack. The left-handed Ross added to his colorful presentation by playing a right-handed guitar upside down, with the bass strings on the bottom.

Ross's first album, Call the Doctor, was recorded as a one-man band and issued in August 1965. The same year, he toured Europe with the American Folk Blues Festival. In 1971, Fourtune issued his second album, Doctor Ross the Harmonica Boss, recorded with the Disciples. The same year, the Flamin' Groovies covered Ross's "Boogie Disease"—albeit uncredited—under the title "Doctor Boogie" on their album Teenage Head. Ross recorded live albums in Germany and Switzerland in 1972. Two years later, Ross played on the Big Bear Records package tour and album American Blues Legends '74.

In 1981, Ross won a Grammy Award for Best Ethnic or Traditional Recording for his appearance on Rare Blues, a 1980 compilation album of blues artists recorded in Chicago from 1963 to 1965. In the latter part of his career, Ross was a frequent fixture at blues festivals in both the United States and Europe. His last album was recorded live in 1991 at the Burnley Blues Festival in England.

== Death ==
Ross died at the age of 67 on May 28, 1993, while working at a Chevrolet plant in Flint, Michigan. After his death, a music scholarship in his name was established at Mott Community College in Flint.

== Discography ==
=== Studio albums ===
- Call the Doctor (Testament, 1965)
- Doctor Ross the Harmonica Boss (Fortune, 1971)
- Jivin' the Blues (Big Bear, 1974)

=== Live albums ===
- The Flying Eagle (Blue Horizon, 1965)
- Live + Well (Ornament, 1972)
- Live at Montreux (Polydor, 1972)
- The Harmonica Boss (Big Bear, 1974)
- One Man Band (Takoma, 1981)
- I Want All My Friends to Know (JSP, 1991)

=== Singles ===
- "Country Clown" / "Doctor Ross Boogie" (Chess, 1952)
- "Come Back Baby" / "Chicago Breakdown" (Sun, 1953)
- "The Boogie Disease" / "Juke Box Boogie" (Sun, 1954)
- "Industrial Boogie" / "Thirty-Two Twenty" (DIR, 1958)
- "Sugar Mama" / "I'd Rather Be an Old Woman's Baby Than a Young Girl's Slave" (Fortune, 1960)
- "Cat Squirrel" / "The Sunnyland" (Fortune, 1961)
- "Cannonball" / "Numbers Blues" (Fortune, 1963)
- "Call the Doctor" / "New York Breakdown" (Fortune, 1963)

=== Compilations ===
- His First Recordings (Arhoolie, 1972)
- Memphis Breakdown (P-Vine, 1987)
- Boogie Disease (Arhoolie, 1992)
- The Harmonica Boss (Fortune, 1995)
- Juke Box Boogie: The Sun Years, Plus (Bear Family, 2013)
