= Unitar (instrument) =

One-stringed guitar

The unitar is a one-string electric guitar. Although rare, the one-string guitar is sometimes heard, particularly in Delta blues, where improvised folk instruments were popular in the 1930s and 1940s.

== History ==
Eddie "One String" Jones had some regional success with a Mississippi blues musician, Lonnie Pitchford, who played a similar homemade instrument. In a more contemporary style, Little Willie Joe Duncan, the inventor of the Unitar, had a considerable rhythm and blues instrumental hit in the 1950s with "Twitchy", recorded with the Rene Hall Orchestra.

== Design ==
The home-made unitar often has a piezoelectric sensor as a pick-up, requiring an external amplifier to be attached to produce a satisfactory sound. PVC piping is a common neck material. As with a normal electric guitar, the unitar does not require a reverberating body like an acoustic guitar.

== Notable players ==
- Seasick Steve
- Brushy One String

== See also ==
- Diddley bow
- Ektara
- Whamola
