= Duncan Swift =

British jazz musician (1943–1997)

Duncan Swift (21 February 1943, Rotherham, Yorkshire – 8 August 1997 Bewdley, Worcestershire) was a British jazz musician and a practitioner of the stride piano performance style. He recorded two albums for Birmingham's Big Bear Records: Out Looking For The Lion, a reference to Willie "The Lion" Smith, and The Broadwood Concert, both recordings produced by his longtime friend Jim Simpson.

Duncan was a qualified classically trained musician and attained L.R.A.M., A.B.S.M., A.B.S.M. (Gen.Mus.) and G.B.S.M. (dist.). He taught music at Hagley RC Secondary School, Worcestershire, as Head of Music in the late 1960s and early 1970s. Also, he lectured at Kidderminster College of Further Education and later left teaching to join Kenny Ball's Jazz Men in 1977. He performed on television and radio in many different countries over the years.

Duncan Swift also made many other recordings with fellow musicians during the course of his career. This includes a solo piano record for the Black Lion titled The Entertainer recorded in 1969. Also, a solo piano tape Tudor Blues performed on his own Bechstein Grand Piano at home in Bewdley. Later, he produced a CD called The Key of D is Daffodill Yellow in 1992 which was recorded at William Bird's 'The Piano Salon' at Avening Recording Studio for Duncan Swift's Records. It was his wish to record another CD in the mid 1990s but he became ill and died before he could fulfil it.

He is survived by his wife and daughter.
