= Sampson Pittman =

American musician

- Born: Sampson Pittman; March 17, 1900; Joiner, Arkansas, United States
- Died: June 10, 1945 (aged 45) Saginaw, Michigan, United States
- Genres: Delta blues
- Occupations: Guitarist, singer, songwriter
- Instruments: Guitar, vocals
- Years active: 1930s
- Label: Various

Sampson "Buddy" Pittman (March 17, 1900 – June 10, 1945) was an American Delta blues guitarist, singer and songwriter. His only known works were recorded alongside fellow Delta blues musician Calvin Frazier by the American folklorist Alan Lomax in Detroit, Michigan, in 1938.

== Biography ==
Pittman was born in Joiner, Arkansas, United States in 1900. He was the son of David Pittman and Evelyn (nee Powell) Wellchance Pittman Harrell. It is apparent from his songs "I Been Down in the Circle Before" and "Levee Camp Story", that he worked as a construction hand on the Laconia Circle Levee near Snow Lake, Arkansas, as a young man. He lived near Blytheville, Arkansas, before moving to Detroit, Michigan, around 1936.

Pittman died on June 10, 1945, in Saginaw, Michigan, and was buried in Forest Lawn Cemetery in Saginaw.

== 1938 recording ==
Samson was recorded by folklorist Alan Lomax in Detroit, Michigan, during three sessions between 15 October – 1 November 1938. During these sessions, Pittman accompanied Calvin Frazier on guitar on twelve recordings and sang on ten of his own original recordings. The Frazier-Pittman recordings were released by Flyright Records in 1980 on the album I'm In The Highway Man. Pittman's tracks alone were compiled into the 1992 album The Devil is Busy by Laurie Records.

== Discography ==
- The Devil is Busy, (Laurie Records, 1992)
