= Domestic Harmony =

Studio album by Do-Ré-Mi
- Released: 23 August 1985
- Recorded: January/February 1985
- Genres: Rock, pop
- Label: Virgin
- Producer: Gavin Mackillop

Do-Ré-Mi chronology
The Waiting Room (1982)	Domestic Harmony (1985)	The Happiest Place in Town (1988)

Singles from Domestic Harmony
- 1. "Man Overboard" Released: May 1985; 2. "Idiot Grin" Released: August 1985; 3. "Warnings Moving Clockwise" Released: November 1985

Professional ratings
Review scores
Source	Rating
Allmusic	3/5 stars

Domestic Harmony is the debut studio album by Australian rock, pop group Do-Ré-Mi which was released by Virgin Records in August 1985. The album has ten tracks, which were written by lead vocalist Deborah Conway, drummer Dorland Bray, bass guitarist Helen Carter and guitarist Stephen Philip. It peaked at No. 6 on the Kent Music Report albums chart.

The lead single "Man Overboard" had made its first appearance on 1982's The Waiting Room extended play, but was re-worked and released as a single from this album to become a top 5 hit, it included lyrics referring to anal humour, penis envy and pubic hair; and had no chorus.

At the 1985 Countdown Music Awards, Domestic Harmony won Best Debut Album and "Man Overboard" won Best Debut Single. The album was released in different forms for UK, German and North American markets and the Australian 1988 CD version had five bonus tracks.

== Track listing ==
All tracks were written by Deborah Conway, Dorland Bray, Helen Carter and Stephen Philip, except where indicated.

Australian 1985 original release

1. "The Theme from Jungle Jim"
2. "After the Volcano"
3. "Idiot Grin"
4. "Cuttlefish Beach"
5. "Warnings Moving Clockwise"
6. "Man Overboard"
7. "Big Accident"
8. "Racing to Zero"
9. "New Taboos"
10. "1000 Mouths"

Bonus tracks for 1988 Australian CD release

11. "Black Crocodiles"
12. "No Fury"
13. "Shake this Place"
14. "Man Overboard" (12" version)
15. "Burning the Blues" (Dorland Bray)

== Charts ==
Chart (1985)	Peak position
Australia (Kent Music Report)	6

== Personnel ==
Do-Ré-Mi members

- Dorland Bray — drums, percussion, backing vocals
- Helen Carter — bass guitar, backing vocals
- Deborah Conway — lead vocalist
- Stephen Philip — guitar

Additional musicians

- Roger Freeman — trombone
- Steve Hogarth — keyboards

Recording details

- Producer, engineer — Gavin MacKillop
  - Assistant engineer — Chris Potter, Mike Bigwood, Steve Chase
- Studio — Townhouse III Studios London
  - Mixing studio — Maison Rouge Studios London, Genetic Studios Reading

Art work

- Cover design and illustration — Cathie Felstead
- Photography — Thomi Wroblewski
