= Guns and Butter (song) =

- 7" single cover

Single by Do-Ré-Mi
- A-side: "Guns and Butter"
- B-side: "Bill the Cat"
- Released: October 1986
- Genre: New wave, rock
- Label: Virgin Records
- Songwriters: Deborah Conway, Dorland Bray, Helen Carter, Stephen Philip
- Producer: Gavin MacKillop

Do-Ré-Mi singles chronology
"Warnings Moving Clockwise" (1985)	"Guns and Butter" (1986)	"Adultery" (1986)

"Guns and Butter" is a song by Australian rock, pop group Do-Ré-Mi released by Virgin Records in October 1986. The song peaked at number 48 on the Australian charts. At the 1986 Countdown Australian Music Awards, Deborah Conway was nominated for Best Female Performance in a Video for the associated music video.

== Track listing ==
All tracks were written by Deborah Conway, Dorland Bray, Helen Carter and Stephen Philip.

1. "Guns and Butter"
2. "Bill the Cat"

== Charts ==
Chart (1986/87)	Peak position
Australia (Kent Music Report)	48

== Personnel ==
Do-Ré-Mi members

- Dorland Bray — drums, percussion, backing vocals
- Helen Carter — bass guitar, backing vocals
- Deborah Conway — lead vocalist
- Stephen Philip — guitar
