= T. J. Fowler =

American jazz musician (1910–1982)

T. J. Fowler (September 18, 1910, Columbus, Georgia, United States – May 22, 1982, Ecorse, Michigan) was an American jazz and jump blues musician, chiefly active in the Detroit musical scene.

Fowler and his family moved to Detroit, Michigan, when he was six years old, where he learned to play piano. After attending the Detroit Conservatory of Music, he played as the house pianist in his father's pool hall; he also worked at the Ford River Rouge Complex for a time. He worked early in the 1940s in the bands of saxophonist Guy Walters and trumpeter Clarence Dorsey and, in 1947, put together his own ensemble, playing behind Paul "Hucklebuck" Williams on recordings for Savoy Records.

In 1948, he began recording as a leader, first with local labels Paradise and Sensation, then with Savoy himself and then States Records. Among his sidemen were Walter Cox (1948–1958), Lee Gross (1948–1953), and Calvin Frazier. Vocalists who worked with the ensemble included Freddie Johnson, Alberta Adams, Floyd McVay, and Varetta Dillard. He accompanied T-Bone Walker in the mid-1950s. The group was active in Michigan through the end of the 1950s, by which time Fowler had switched to electronic organ as his primary instrument. He ran his own short-lived label, Bow Records, in the late 1950s; in 1959, he was hired by Berry Gordy to work for the nascent Motown Records as an advisor. Later in life he left music to run a landscaping business in Detroit.

== Discography ==
=== Original 10" shellac (78 rpm) and 7" vinyl (45 rpm) releases ===
Paradise Records release:

- 118 "Sultry Moon" [mx# 118] // "Mango Blues" (v: Freddie Johnson) [mx# 120] – by T. J. Fowler and Orchestra

Sensation Records releases:

- 28 "Midnight Clipper, Pt. 1" // "Midnight Clipper, Pt. 2" – by T. J. Fowler and His Orchestra
- 36 "Hot Sauce" // "Blue Lullaby" – by T. J. Fowler and His Orchestra

National Resords releases:

- 9072 "Red Hot Blues" // "Harmony Grits" – by T. J. Fowler and Orchestra
- 9075 "T.J. Boogie" // "What's The Matter Now" (v: Hank Ivory) – by T. J. Fowler and Orchestra

Savoy Records releases:

- 843 "Fowler's Boogie" // "Night Crawler" – by T. J. Fowler, His Piano and Orchestra
- 857 "Wine Cooler" // "Back Biter" – by T. J. Fowler, His Piano and Orchestra
- 858 "Got Nobody To Tell My Troubles To" // "Little Baby Child" – by Calvin Frazier with T. J. Fowler Orchestra
- 884 "Three Lies" // "Getting Ready For My Daddy" – by Varetta Dillard with T. J. Fowler Orchestra
- 885 "Camel Walk" // "Gold Rush" – by T. J. Fowler, His Piano and Orchestra

States Records release:

- 132 "The Queen" // "Tell Me What's The Matter" (v: Frank Taylor) – by T. J. Fowler and His Band That Rocks The Blues

Bow Records release:

- 309 "Milk Shake" // "Coochie" – by T. J. Fowler and His Orchestra
