= Washboard Willie =

American singer

Background information
- Born: William Paden Hensley; July 24, 1906 or 1909; Bullock County, Alabama or Columbus, Georgia, United States
- Died: August 24, 1991 (age 82 or 85) Detroit, Michigan, United States
- Genres: Detroit blues
- Occupations: Singer, washboard player
- Instruments: Vocals, washboard, harmonica, drums
- Years active: 1952–1979

William Paden Hensley (July 24, 1906 or 1909 – August 24, 1991), known as Washboard Willie, was an American Detroit blues musician, who specialised in playing the washboard. He recorded tracks including "A Fool on a Mule in the Middle of The Road" plus "Cherry Red Blues", and worked variously with Eddie "Guitar" Burns, Baby Boy Warren, and Boogie Woogie Red.

== Biography ==
Hensley was born either in Bullock County, Alabama, in 1906, or in Columbus, Georgia, in 1909. "Washboard Willie", as he became known, did not take up music until his thirties. By 1948 he had relocated to Detroit, and in 1952, he watched Eddie "Guitar" Burns performing and played along with Burns' backing group. He impressed the proprietor and ended up with a three-year residency with the band.

Working full-time washing cars for a living, he decided to name his own musical ensemble, Washboard Willie and the Super Suds of Rhythm, working from the name of a once-popular laundry detergent. He graduated from just playing the washboard to incorporate a bass drum and snare and, in 1955, gave Little Sonny his first booking. In 1956, Hensley made his own debut recording of "Cherry Red Blues," with "Washboard Shuffle;" and then "Washboard Blues Pt. 1 & 2." His recording career continued until 1962 utilising Boogie Woogie Red on piano accompaniment. The recordings were not issued until 1969 on Barrelhouse Records. However, in 1966, Willie did release a single with the tracks "Natural Born Lover," and "Wee Baby Blues." His band remained in demand playing nightly in both Detroit and Ann Arbor.

In 1973, he toured Europe with Lightnin' Slim, Moses "Whispering" Smith, Snooky Pryor, Homesick James and Boogie Woogie Red; he also played at the Ann Arbor Blues and Jazz Festival that year on the Saturday afternoon "Detroit Blues" show. A compilation album, American Blues Legends '73 was issued on Big Bear Records with Willie contributing the tracks, "I Feel So Fine" and "Kansas City." Six years later he stopped playing professionally.

He died in Detroit in August 1991.

== Recent discography ==
- Motor Town Boogie (2007) – P-Vine Records

== See also ==
- List of Detroit blues musicians
