= Cousin Joe =

American blues and jazz singer

Background information
- Born: Pleasant Joseph; December 20, 1907; Wallace, Louisiana, United States
- Died: October 2, 1989 (aged 81) New Orleans, Louisiana, United States
- Genres: Blues
- Occupations: Pianist, singer
- Instruments: Piano, vocal
- Years active: Late 1930s – late 1980s
- Labels: Philo, Savoy, Gotham, De Luxe, Signature, Decca, Imperial, Flip

Pleasant Joseph, known as Cousin Joe, (December 20, 1907 – October 2, 1989) was a New Orleans blues and jazz singer, famous for his 1940s recordings with Sidney Bechet and Mezz Mezzrow.

== Life ==
He was born in Wallace, Louisiana, United States, and worked at Whitney Plantation throughout his childhood.

Until 1945, Cousin Joe toured Louisiana; that year he was asked to take part in the King Jazz recording sessions organized by Mezzrow and Bechet.

In the 1970s, Cousin Joe toured extensively throughout the UK and Europe, both individually and as part of the American Blues Legends '74 revue organised by Big Bear Music. He also recorded the albums Gospel-Wailing, Jazz-Playing, Rock'n'Rolling, Soul-Shouting, Tap-Dancing Bluesman From New Orleans for Big Bear.

Cousin Joe died in his sleep from natural causes in New Orleans, at the age of 81. He was survived by his wife Irene Joseph, son Michael and his three grandchildren Rahsaan, Mignonne and Jarrell.

== Autobiography ==
- Cousin Joe : Blues from New Orleans / Pleasant "Cousin Joe" Joseph and Harriet J. Ottenheimer. Chicago : University of Chicago Press, 1987. xi, 227 p. : ill.; 23 cm. ISBN 0-226-41198-2

== Partial discography ==
- 1971 : Bad Luck Blues (Black & Blue) with Jimmy Dawkins and Clarence "Gatemouth" Brown
- 1973 : Cousin Joe From New Orleans (BluesWay)
- 1974 : Gospel Wailing, Jazz Playing, Soul Shouting, Tap Dancing Bluesman from New Orleans (Big Bear Records)
- 1974 : American Blues Legends '74 (Big Bear Records)
- 1984 : Cousin Joe from New Orleans in his prime (Oldie Blues)
- 1985 : Relaxin' in New Orleans [sound recording] / Cousin Joe. New Orleans, LA : Great Southern Records. 1 sound disc : analog, 33 1/3 rpm; 12 in.
- 1995 : Jumping at Jubilee [sound recording]. London : Sequel, NEM CD 749
- 1996 : Blues Festival [sound recording]. {Laserlight Records}, NEW CD 17 105
- 2003 : Magic Bostic - Bostic, Earl, 1913–1965 [sound recording] / Earl Bostic. Paris : Jazz Archives

== Filmography ==
- 2005 : DVD The Blues of Cousin Joe (live - 29 August 1984 in New Orleans) (Storyville Films)
