= Eddie "One String" Jones =

Background information
- Birth name: Eddie Jones or Jesse Marshall
- Also known as: One String
- Born: December 10, 1926; Mississippi, U.S.
- Died: Unknown
- Genres: Country blues
- Occupation: Musician
- Instruments: Unitar; vocals
- Years active: 1960s

Eddie "One String" Jones (December 10, 1926 – Unknown) was an American country blues unitar player and vocalist who was active in Los Angeles, California. Little to nothing is known about Jones's personal background – his name may have not even been Eddie Jones, but rather Jesse Marshall – yet he is remembered for his 1960 recordings that appeared on an album, along with work by fellow musician Edward Hazelton. Jones's musicianship is regarded as a link between American blues and original elements of African music.

Jones drifted to Los Angeles to work as a street performer in a poor district of the city known as Skid Row. Relying partially on the novelty of the unitar, which he crudely assembled with a piece of timber wood, one broom wire stretched across it, and a tin can mounted on the end, Jones gave no indication that the instrument or his technique were anything but peculiar to himself. Music historian David Campbell expounded on how Jones played the unitar, writing, "He played it by sliding a half-pint bottle along the wire with his left hand, while striking it near the resonating can with a little whittled stick in his right hand". It is directly related to the diddley bow, which in itself derived from West African instruments; however, Jones's practice of percussively sounding the resonator, and unorthodox sliding was far removed from known slide and bottleneck techniques.

In 1960 Jones approached record producer Frederick Usher Jr., with his unitar in hand. Usher had been investigating the skid row district, spectating the offerings of several street performers, and was immediately intrigued by Jones's otherworldly sound. On February 14, 1960, Jones and Usher recorded a raw set of blues standards in a back alley on a portable tape recorder. Over the course of a few months, the two came together for two additional recording sessions in the more practical settings of a studio to cut a total of nine songs. Jones even agreed to perform for a private party for Usher's associates, where he openly resented having to share the stage with Usher's other discovery, harmonica player "Poor Traveling" Edward Hazelton. Hazelton, too, was a drifter, originally from South Carolina, who accompanied himself with the harmonica. Having no aspirations for fame, afterwards, the two musicians disappeared from any further documentation, never to record again.

In 1964 Usher partially released the recordings of Jones and Hazelton on the album "One String" Jones and Edward Hazelton – One String Blues, which was distributed on Takoma Records. The album questionably states that Jones accompanied himself on a homemade "zither-monochord", and opens with an interview with Jones describing his instrumental methods and notoriety in Skid Row. In 1993, Gazelle Productions reissued the album under the simplified title One String Blues, with six additional tracks. Captain Beefheart endorsed Jones's material in a 1995 excerpt of Mojo magazine's featured topic called "The Greatest Thing I've Ever Heard All Year". As a result, Jones's music and the mystery of his life are examined by blues enthusiasts. In 2002, One String Blues was re-released on Big Beat Records.
