= King of Moomba (song) =

- 7" single cover

Single by Do-Ré-Mi

from the album The Happiest Place in Town
- A-side: "King of Moomba"
- B-side: "Tearing up the Carpet"
- Released: January 1988
- Genre: New wave, rock
- Label: Virgin Records
- Songwriter(s): Deborah Conway, Dorland Bray, Helen Carter, Stephen Philip
- Producer(s): Martin Rushent

Do-Ré-Mi singles chronology
"Adultery" (1987)	"King of Moomba" (1988)	"The Happiest Place in Town" (1988)

"King of Moomba" is a song by Australian rock/pop group Do-Ré-Mi released by Virgin Records in January 1988 as the second single from the group's second album The Happiest Place in Town. The song was written by lead vocalist Deborah Conway, drummerDorland Bray, bass guitarist Helen Carter and guitarist Stephen Philip. While the B-side "Tearing up the Carpet" was written by Carter and Philip. The song peaked at number 52 on the Australian charts.

Moomba in the song's title refers to the annual festival held in Melbourne which had an appointed 'King of Moomba' from 1967–1987 and was then replaced by a 'Moomba Monarch'. The 'Kings of Moomba' for the 1980s were TV actor Paul Cronin (1980), former footballer Lou Richards (1981), film, TV and stage actor Frank Thring (1982), TV personality Daryl Somers (1983), footballer Kevin Bartlett (1984), TV personality Ian "Molly" Meldrum (1985), motor racing driver Peter Brock (1986) and champion doubles tennis player Paul McNamee (1987).

== Track listing ==
1. "King of Moomba"
2. "Tearing up the Carpet" (Carter, Philip)

== Charts ==
Chart (1988)	Peak position
Australia (Kent Music Report)	52

== Personnel ==
Do-Ré-Mi members

- Dorland Bray — drums, percussion, backing vocals
- Helen Carter — bass guitar, backing vocals
- Deborah Conway — lead vocalist
- Stephen Philip — guitar
