= The Waiting Room (EP) =

EP by Do-Re-Mi
- Released: January 1983
- Recorded: September 1982
- Genre: Rock/Pop
- Label: Larrikan

Do-Re-Mi chronology
Do-Ré-Mi (1982)	The Waiting Room (1983)	Domestic Harmony (1985)

The Waiting Room is the second EP by Australian rock/pop group Do-Ré-Mi and was released by independent label Larrikin Records in January 1983. The album has six tracks, which were written by lead vocalist Deborah Conway, drummer Dorland Bray, bass guitarist Helen Carter and guitarist Stephen Philip. "Man Overboard" made its first appearance on this EP, but was re-worked and released as a single in 1985 to become a surprise top 5 hit, it included lyrics referring to anal humour, penis envy and pubic hair; and had no chorus. Paul Hester, later drummer for Split Enz and Crowded House, was living with Conway and guested on timbales for the track, "(Just Like) Hercules".

== Background ==
Do-Ré-Mi had formed in Sydney in 1981 when Deborah Conway (lead vocals) and Dorland Bray (drums, percussion, backing vocals), both previously in Melbourne-based group The Benders, joined Helen Carter (bass, backing vocals) ex-Friction. Stephen Philip (guitar), ex-Thought Criminals, was initially a studio musician for their debut EP, Do-Ré-Mi released in August 1982 and was asked to join formally. They returned to the studio almost immediately and recorded The Waiting Room which was released in January 1983. Conway was living with Paul Hester drummer in Deckchairs Overboard (later in Split Enz and Crowded House), Hester guested on timbales for the track "(Just Like) Hercules" on this EP. "Man Overboard" had its first appearance on this EP but was later re-worked and released as a single in 1985 when it peaked at #5 on the Australian singles charts. Lyrical content included references to anal humour, penis envy and pubic hair. In 2001, Carter recalled the problems Do-Ré-Mi had with their record company over "Man Overboard" for the Australian Broadcasting Corporation TV series Long Way To The Top.

There was a real hit-maker mentality ... people would say 'It can't be a hit - it doesn't have a chorus... You're talking about pubic hair, oh my God!'

— Helen Carter, 2001

== Track listing ==
All tracks were written by Deborah Conway, Dorland Bray, Helen Carter and Stephen Philip.

1. "Disneyland"
2. "Creatures of Habit"
3. "Wreaths and Bouquets"
4. "(Just Like) Hercules"
5. "Man Overboard"
6. "Waiting Room"

== Personnel ==
Do-Ré-Mi members

- Dorland Bray — drums, percussion, backing vocals
- Helen Carter — bass guitar, backing vocals
- Deborah Conway — lead vocalist
- Stephen Philip — guitar

Additional musicians

- Peter Doyle — trumpet
- Louise Elliot — tenor saxophone
- Paul Hester — timbales (track 4)
