= Diddley bow =

Single-stringed American instrument

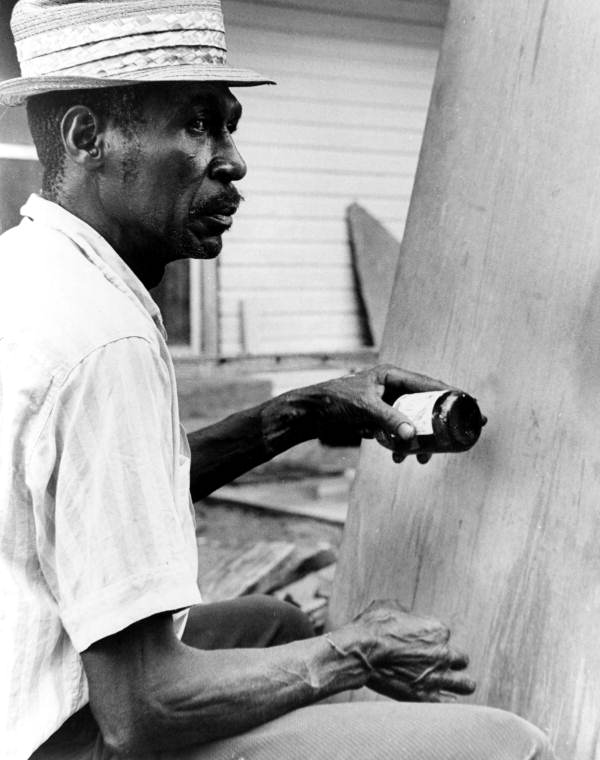
Moses Williams playing the diddley bow, 1982

The diddley bow is a single-stringed American instrument that influenced the development of the blues sound. It consists of a single string of baling wire tensioned between two nails on a board over a glass bottle, which is used both as a bridge and as a means to amplify the instrument's sound.

It was traditionally considered a starter or children's instrument in the Deep South, especially in the African American community, and is rarely heard outside the rural South. It may have been influenced to some degree by West African instruments. Other nicknames for this instrument include "jitterbug" or "one-string," while an ethnomusicologist would formally call it a "monochord zither."

== Origins ==
The diddley bow derives from instruments used in the Sahel region of West Africa, in places such as northern Nigeria and Mali. There, they were often played by children, one beating the string with sticks and the other changing the pitch by moving a slide up and down. The instrument was then developed as a children's toy by slaves in the United States. They were first documented in the rural South by researchers in the 1930s.

The diddley bow was traditionally considered a beginners instrument, normally played by adolescent boys, who then graduate to a standard guitar if they show promise on the diddley bow. However currently, the diddley bow is also played by professional players as a solo as well as an accompaniment instrument.

The diddley bow is significant to blues music in that many blues guitarists got their start playing it as children, as well as the fact that, like the slide guitar, it is played with a slide. However, because it was considered a children's instrument, few musicians continued to play the diddley bow once they reached adulthood.

== Construction ==
The diddley bow is typically homemade, consisting usually of a wooden board and a single wire string stretched between two screws, and played by plucking while varying the pitch with a metal or glass slide held in the other hand. A glass bottle is usually used as the bridge, which helps amplify the sound. Some diddley bows have an added resonator box under the bridge, and are essentially single-string cigar box guitars. Some recent diddley bows are electrified with pickups.

== Notable users ==
One notable performer of the instrument was the Mississippi blues musician Lonnie Pitchford, who used to demonstrate the instrument by stretching a wire between two nails hammered into the wood of a vertical beam making up part of the front porch of his home. Pitchford's headstone, placed on his grave in 2000 by the Mount Zion Memorial Fund, is actually designed with a playable diddley bow on the side as requested by Pitchford's family.

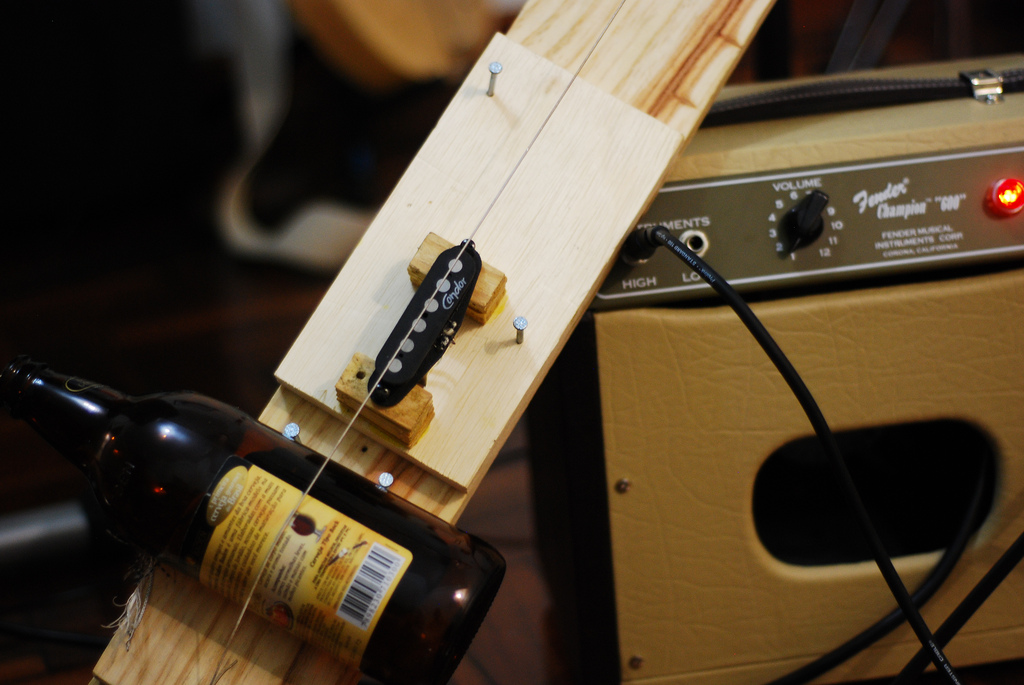
An electric diddley bow

Other notable traditional players include Jessie Mae Hemphill, Eddie "One String" Jones, Napoleon Strickland, James "Super Chikan" Johnson and One String Sam. Willie Joe Duncan was also notable for his work with a large electrified diddley bow he called a Unitar. Buddy Guy learned to play music on a two-string homemade diddley bow before getting his first guitar (a Harmony acoustic). As a child, blues musician Elmore James describes using a diddley bow: he "plucked a wire strung on the wall of his house while sliding a bottle along it to vary the pitch."

Recent performers who use similar instruments include New York City-based jazz pianist Cooper-Moore, American bluesman Seasick Steve, Andy Slater a.k.a. Velcro Lewis, and Chicago-based percussionist Coco Elysses. Jack White makes one at the beginning of the movie It Might Get Loud, then after playing it quips, "Who says you need to buy a guitar?". Seasick Steve recorded a tribute to his diddley bow, via his song "Diddley Bo" from his 2009 album, Man From Another Time.

== Filmography ==
- American Patchwork: Songs and Stories of America, part 3: "The Land Where the Blues Began" (1990). Written, directed, and produced by Alan Lomax; developed by the Association for Cultural Equity at Columbia University and Hunter College. North Carolina Public TV; A Dibb Direction production for Channel Four.
- It Might Get Loud, a 2008 documentary about the careers and influences of prominent rock guitarists, features Jack White building a diddley bow from scratch and playing a tune on it.

== Discography ==
- Louis Dotson - "Sitting on Top of the World" on Bothered All the Time, Southern Culture SC 1703
- Willie Joe (Duncan) and His Unitar – The track "Unitar Rock," is available on Teen Beat Vol 4., Ace CDCHD 655. "Twitchy" and "Cherokee Dance" are available on The Specialty Story, Specialty 5SPCD-4412-2.
- Glen Faulkner – "Cotton Pickin' Blues," "Louisiana Blues," "Glory, Glory, Hallelujah," "Get Right Church And Lets Go Home," on The Spirit Lives On: Deep South Country Blues and Spirituals in the 1990s, Hot Fox HF-CD-005 (German CD, now out of print).
- Jessie Mae Hemphill – two tracks (one accompanied by Compton Jones) on Heritage of the Blues: Shake It, Baby, HighTone HCD 8156. Two tracks (accompanied by Compton Jones and Glen Faulkner) on Get Right Blues, Inside Sounds ISC-0519.
- Compton Jones – One track, "Shake 'Em On Down," on Afro-American Folk Music from Tate and Panola Counties, Mississippi, Rounder 1515 (CD). With booklet notes by diddley bow scholar, Dr. David Evans.
- Eddie "One String" Jones – One String Blues, Takoma Records CDTAK 1023. Nine tracks, the first one an interview of Eddie Jones where he tells how he built his instrument. The booklet notes includes a drawing and some photographs of his instrument and of him playing.
- The Almanac of Bad Luck 2009 by Tijuana Hercules.
- Lonnie Pitchford – Pitchford was another diddley bow master. He can be heard on four tracks on National Downhome Blues Festival Volume One, Southland SCD-21, "Train Coming Around the Bend," "My Babe," "Mary Had a Little Lamb" and "One-String Boogie." Two tracks on All Around Man, Rooster R2629; "Real Rock Music: Crawlin' Kingsnake" and "My Babe." One track on Living Country Blues, Evidence ECD 26105-2 ("Boogie Chillen"). Also, another "One-String Boogie," and "My Baby Walked Away" on American Folk Blues Festival '83; "Johnny Stole An Apple," Living Country Blues USA - Volume 7: Afro-American Blues Roots; "My Baby Walked Away" on Living Country Blues USA - Volume 9: Mississippi Moan and (yet another) "One String Boogie" on Living Country Blues USA - Volume 10: Country Boogie
- Napoleon Strickland – One track, "Key to the Blues," on Bottleneck Blues, Testament 5021 (CD). (This same cut also appears on the CD Africa and the Blues).
- One String Sam – Two cuts ("I Need $100" and "I Got to Go") from the 1973 Ann Arbor Blues and Jazz Festival on Motor City Blues / Please Mr. Foreman, Schoolkids' Records, SKR2101-2. Two tracks on Rural Blues Vol 1 (1934–1956), Document Records B000000J8B ("I Need $100" and "My Baby, Oooo" (studio versions).
- One String Willie - Seven tracks on A Store-Bought Guitar Just Won't Do, 10 tracks on You Gotta Hit the String Right to Make the Music Swing.
- Moses Williams – four tracks on a double-LP anthology of Florida blues produced by the Florida Folklife Program; Drop on Down In Florida, Florida Folklife LP 102-103. A double-CD-with-hardback book edition of this double-LP set has been released, adding ten further tracks. Two CDs from the Florida Folklife Collection present Williams playing and singing "Which Way Did My Baby Go?" and "Apple Farm Blues."
- Velcro Lewis:
  - The Oven's On 2007 by Velcro Lewis and His 100 Proof Band.
  - The Bronze Age 2009 by the Velcro Lewis Group.
  - White Magick Summer 2010 by the Velcro Lewis Group.

== Similar instruments ==
- Cigar box guitar
- Kontigi
- Garaya
- Musical bow
- Ngoni
- Slide guitar
- Xalam
- Washtub bass (gut bucket)

== See also ==
- Bo Diddley
- Electric blues
- Electric guitar
- Unitar (instrument)
