= Do-Re-Mi (EP) =

Do-Ré-Mi

EP by Do-Ré-Mi
- Released: 23 August 1982
- Recorded: July 1982
- Label: Green

Do-Ré-Mi chronology
Do-Ré-Mi (1982)	The Waiting Room (1982)

Do-Ré-Mi or Standing on Wires is the debut extended play (EP) by Australian rock, pop group Do-Ré-Mi which was released by independent label Green Records in August 1982. The album has four tracks, which were written by lead vocalist Deborah Conway, drummer Dorland Bray, bass guitarist Helen Carter and guitarist Stephen Philip. Philip had been a session musician but was invited to join the band during recording in July.

== Background ==
Do-Ré-Mi had formed in Sydney in 1981 when Deborah Conway (lead vocals) and Dorland Bray (drums, percussion, backing vocals), both previously in Melbourne-based group The Benders, joined Helen Carter (bass, backing vocals) ex-Friction. Stephen Philip (guitar), ex-Thought Criminals, was initially a studio musician for this EP. Do-Ré-Mi was recorded in July 1982 and Philip was asked to join formally by its release in August. They returned to the studio almost immediately and recorded their next EP The Waiting Room which was released in January 1983.

Carter later said, "When we did release the first EP we didn't even put on it what everybody did; we just put our names on it and that really shat everybody off. Definitely the press hated us. The success of it, which had a lot to do with 2JJ in those days, was a real surprise."

== Track listing ==
All tracks were written by Deborah Conway, Dorland Bray, Helen Carter and Stephen Philip.

1. "Standing on Wires"
2. "Honeymoon"
3. "Pecking Order"
4. "Violet Town"

== Personnel ==
Do-Ré-Mi members

- Dorland Bray – drums, percussion, backing vocals
- Helen Carter – bass guitar, backing vocals
- Deborah Conway – lead vocalist
- Stephen Philip – guitar
