= Willie D. Warren =

American electric blues guitarist and singer (1924–2000)

- Born: September 11, 1924; Stamps, Arkansas, United States
- Died: December 30, 2000 (aged 76) Detroit, Michigan, United States
- Genres: Detroit blues, electric blues
- Occupations: Guitarist, bassist, singer
- Instruments: Guitar, vocals
- Years active: 1940s–2000

Willie D. Warren (September 11, 1924 – December 30, 2000) was an American electric blues guitarist, bass player and singer. In a long career, he worked with Otis Rush, Al Benson, Little Sonny Cooper, David Honeyboy Edwards, Baby Boy Warren, Guitar Slim, Freddie King, Jimmy Reed, Morris Pejoe, Bobo Jenkins and Jim McCarty. One of Warren's better-known recordings was "Baby Likes to Boogie".

He was described by the AllMusic journalist Michael G. Nastos as "one of the Midwest's true blues treasures".

== Biography ==
Warren was born in Stamps, Arkansas, and moved with his family to Lake Village, Arkansas, when he was 13 years old. He was taught by Caleb King to play the guitar, and played in his own blues ensemble around the Mississippi Delta. He taught guitar techniques to his band's singer, Guitar Slim, and they toured around Louisiana in the latter half of the 1940s.

Warren relocated to Chicago by the early 1950s and joined Otis Rush's band. He later played alongside Freddie King and Jimmy Reed, and he backed Morris Pejoe on tracks recorded for Chess Records.

Back in Arkansas in 1959, Warren formed the House Rockers. By the early 1970s he had moved to Detroit to work and record with Bobo Jenkins. From 1974 to 1976 he was also a featured performer, along with Baby Boy Warren (no relation), with the Progressive Blues Band, a popular blues band that performed in many of Detroit's best blues venues. When Baby Boy Warren died, in 1977, Willie D. Warren took up the duties of frontman for the band.

In 1977, Warren recorded his first solo album, which was released on Jenkins's label, Big Star. Warren also wrote songs, including two—"Door Lock Blues" and "Detroit Jump"—that Jenkins recorded for his album Detroit All Purpose Blues. Warren's recordings have been issued on two compilation albums. His live album, Live, recorded for the No Cover Productions label, was not released until after Warren's death. His backing band at that time, Mystery Train, included his old friend Jim McCarty.

Warren died in Detroit, in December 2000, at the age of 76. He left one son, Willie Hairston.

The Detroit Blues Society posthumously recognized Warren's contribution to the blues with its 2011 Lifetime Achievement Award.

== Partial discography ==
=== Albums ===
- Live (2005), Willie D. Warren & Mystery Train (No Cover Productions)
- Last Blues: The Detroit Sessions Vol 1 and Vol 2 (2015), Willie D. Warren featuring Howard Glazer

=== Compilation albums ===
- Hastings Street Grease Vol. 1 (1998), Blue Suit Records
- Hastings Street Grease Vol. 2 (1999), Blue Suit Records

== See also ==
- List of Detroit blues musicians
