= Will Johns =

British musician

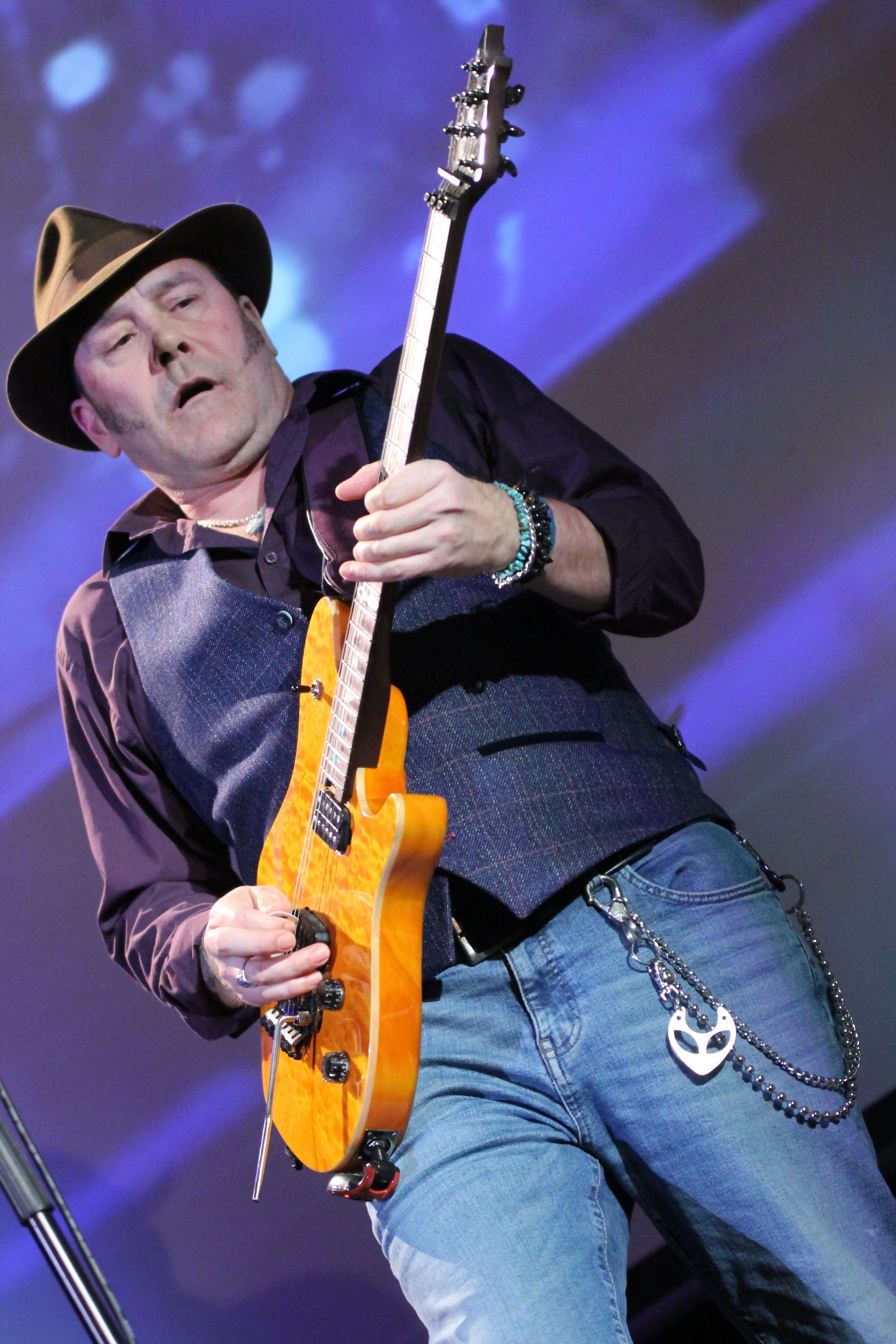
- Johns performing in 2024

Background information
- Born: 22 March 1973 (age 53); London, England
- Genres: Rock, blues, jazz
- Occupations: Singer, musician, songwriter
- Instruments: Vocals, guitar
- Years active: 1998–present
- Label: Big Bear
- Website: willjohns.com

Will Johns (born 22 March 1973) is an English rock singer and guitarist. Leading the Will Johns Band he has performed with renowned artists such as Joe Strummer, Eric Clapton, Jay Kay (Jamiroquai) Ronnie Wood, Jack Bruce, and Bill Wyman. Johns is the son of record producer Andy Johns and nephew of Glyn Johns.

== Early life ==
Johns was born in London to actress Paula Boyd and record producer Andy Johns.

Johns grew up in a musical family and was first exposed to musical instruments when visiting record studios where his father, Andy Johns, was a record producer. Some of John’s earliest memories revolve around the smell of electricity and music equipment emanating from the studios his father worked in.

During his youth, Johns’s parents, Andy Johns and Paula Boyd (sister of Pattie Boyd), struggled with substance addiction and alcoholism, leading his uncle Eric Clapton and aunt Pattie to nearly foster Johns. Johns visited Clapton and Pattie Boyd’s house, "Hurtwood Edge", regularly on weekends and holidays, taking advantage of Clapton’s recording studio to learn to play the drums. Hurtwood Edge was like a second home to the young Johns who continued to get exposure to musical instruments during his frequent visits. Early one morning when Johns was playing the drums, Clapton suggested; "don’t you think it's time you learned to play a proper musical instrument?" Clapton proceeded to show him the opening riffs to Crossroads and Bad Love, but then let Johns learn the remaining parts of the songs on his own. Johns continued to learn guitar teaching himself his uncle’s songs. Johns was given his first guitar, a Fender Stratocaster, at age fifteen by his father.

At an early age, Johns was between finishing school and living with his uncle or moving to Hollywood in hopes of starting an entertainment career. John chose the latter of the two options, but his entertainment dream did not come to fruition in the U.S. Returning back to England, Johns attended college in Oxford to pursue a performing arts course where he supported himself by performing in the town center. Playing guitar in the central streets of Oxford sparked passion in Johns who realized he could earn money from his guitar and singing skills. Johns graduated with B.Tech in performing arts.

== Career ==
The first band Johns played in was Sun Machine, which he joined as a singer and played with during the early 1990s. The first band started by Johns himself was called Cloud Nine. The drummer, Chris Gale, is still a touring member of his current band; the pair have been playing together for thirty-two years. Cloud Nine was active and toured around Oxford and London.

After playing in a number of other small bands, Johns moved to Los Angeles to play in a band called Psy with his brother Evan, and Eva Gardner, daughter of famous bass guitar player Kim Gardner. The band played locally in Los Angeles in the classic clubs surrounding the sunset strip.

During his time and Los Angeles, Johns received a call from a friend who was driving trucks for Jamiroquai. Invited to Las Vegas, where Jamiroquai was playing that night as an opener for the Rolling Stones, Johns had a jam session at the MGM Grand with Jay Kay (Jamiroquai), Jesse Wood, Slash, Ronnie Wood, and a few other famous musicians, which ultimately led to the creation of the band Glyda. Johns and Jesse Wood wrote many songs and toured with the band from 1996 to 2001. The band broke up when Jesse wanted to spend more time with his girlfriend of the time, Kate Moss.

Dealing with the break up of Glyda, Johns returned home and spent some time away from touring and rockstar lifestyle. Moving to Brighton, Johns worked in entertainment at the SeaLife Center, the world's oldest still running aquarium, showing the exhibits and animals to aquariums guests. After working in the aquarium, Johns worked for commercial fishing charter boats for around six years. It was during this time that Johns released his first album, Count on Me.

After the release of Count on Me, the song "On My Back" was praised by reporter Clive Rawlings who interviewed Johns for the magazine: "Blues Matters!". After this interview, Johns career in England ballooned in around 2011, with Johns playing an increasing number of shows and gaining nominations in several blues awards domestically. Johns was invited to play in Russia on multiple occasions, including for a concert at a maximum security prison for serious offending women. It was during this time that John released his second album; Hooks and Lines, drawing inspiration from his stint as a commercial fisherman. The album art on the release features Johns coming out of the sea playing his guitar.

His third album, Something Old, Something New, draws inspiration from Johns earlier days and features tracks from his years in his earlier bands, such as Cloud Nine.

John’s fourth release, Bluesdaddy, got to the number one slot in the Roots Music Report in the U.K. and still remained in the chart at #19 nearly two years after its release. The release also peaked at #4 on the Independent British Blues Association Chart.

Johns currently plays for Cream of Clapton, which he co-founded with Simon Roberts in June 2022. The band features Dylan Elise and the son of Eric Clapton’s long time bassist Nathan East: Noah East. Cream of Clapton draws inspiration from Eric Clapton’s Heaven Band Era The band began playing live in March 2023 with a show in Augsburg, Germany, and has played 20 dates in Europe to date, including a sold out London show. The band also toured in North America, with a notable stop in San Diego which featured Nathan East, Greg Phillinganes, and Steve Ferrone (all ex band members of Eric Clapton).

Johns is currently working on his fifth release, Yin & Yang. Yin & Yang is being tested for release on an Eco friendly vinyl. Johns is on the advisory board for Evolution Music, a company dedicated to dispelling the use of single use plastics within the music industry.

== Personal life ==
Johns' uncles included Eric Clapton, Mick Fleetwood and the late George Harrison. His mother Paula Boyd is the sister of Pattie Boyd, ex-wife of George Harrison and Eric Clapton and Jenny Boyd, ex-wife of Mick Fleetwood, founder of Fleetwood Mac.

Johns is an avid fisherman and was taught how to cast a line by Eric Clapton. Johns packs a rod with him on tour and tries to fish as much as he can. Johns also owns a boat in Brighton where he can be found out fishing and relaxing. John also is the all England Squid Fishing Champion of 2014.

Johns credits Clapton with teaching him both the guitar and how to fish, providing Johns with both income and a means to feed himself.

== Discography ==
- Count On Me (2009)
- Hooks and Lines (2012)
- Something Old, Something New... (2016)
- Bluesdaddy (2021)
- Yin & Yang (2023)
