= Man Overboard (Do-Re-Mi song) =

- 7" single cover

Single by Do-Ré-Mi

from the album Domestic Harmony
- A-side: "Man Overboard"
- B-side: "Fish Tank", "Black Crocodiles"
- Released: May 1985
- Recorded: Sydney, 1985
- Genre: New wave
- Length: 4:08
- Label: Virgin Records
- Songwriters: Deborah Conway, Dorland Bray, Helen Carter, Stephen Philip
- Producer: Gavin MacKillop

Do-Ré-Mi singles chronology
"Man Overboard" (1985)	"Idiot Grin" (1986)

"Man Overboard" is a song by Australian rock, pop group Do-Ré-Mi recorded in 1982 for the EP The Waiting Room. The song was re-recorded in 1985 and released in May 1985 as the lead single from the group's debut studio album, Domestic Harmony. The 7" vinyl version has three tracks, which were written by lead vocalist Deborah Conway, drummer Dorland Bray, bass guitarist Helen Carter and guitarist Stephen Philip. It peaked at No. 5 on the Kent Music Report singles chart.

The song is the first Australian hit to include lyrics mentioning penis envy and pubic hair; it also had no chorus. The single version was produced and engineered by Gavin McKillop.

At the 1985 Countdown Music Awards, the song won Best Debut Single.

== Details ==
The version on The Waiting Room is much faster than the recording released as a single. Some DJs would unwittingly play the EP at 33 1/3 rpm. Conway said, "We would hear radio DJs playing the song at the wrong speed and I would sound like Nick Cave incanting. We'd heard this over and over and started thinking, 'Well, why don't we just slow it down?'"

In 2001, Carter recalled the problems Do-Ré-Mi had with their record company over "Man Overboard" for the Australian Broadcasting Corporation TV series Long Way to the Top, "There was a real hit-maker mentality ... people would say 'It can't be a hit – it doesn't have a chorus... You're talking about pubic hair, oh my God!'" Conway's memory differed. She said, "I remember it was us not wanting to release it as a single. It was us thinking radio would never play it."

== Track listing ==
All tracks were written by Deborah Conway, Dorland Bray, Helen Carter and Stephen Philip.

1. "Man Overboard" – 4:08
2. "Fish Tank" – 2:43
3. "Black Crocodiles" – 3:12

== Charts ==
=== Weekly charts ===
Weekly chart performance for "Man Overboard"
Chart (1985)	Peak position
Australia (Kent Music Report)	5

=== Year-end charts ===
Year-end chart performance for "Man Overboard"
Chart (1985)	Position
Australia (Kent Music Report)	42

== Personnel ==
Do-Ré-Mi members

- Dorland Bray – drums, percussion, backing vocals
- Helen Carter – bass guitar, backing vocals
- Deborah Conway – lead vocalist
- Stephen Philip – guitar

== Cover versions ==
- In 2003, george covered the song as a B-side to their single "Still Real". It featured Do-Re-Mi vocalist Deborah Conway.
