= The Happiest Place in Town =

Studio album by Do-Ré-Mi
- Released: February 1988
- Recorded: 1988
- Genre: Rock, pop
- Label: Virgin
- Producer: Martin Rushent

Do-Ré-Mi chronology
| Domestic Harmony (1985) | The Happiest Place in Town (1988) |

Singles from The Happiest Place in Town
- 1. "Adultery" Released: October 1986; 2. "King of Moomba" Released: January 1988; 3. "Haunt You" Released: March 1988; 4. "Happiest Place in Town" Released: 30 May 1988

Professional ratings
Review scores
| Source | Rating |
|---|---|
| Allmusic | 3/5 stars |

The Happiest Place in Town is the second and final studio album by Australian rock/pop group Do-Re-Mi and was released by Virgin Records in August 1988. The album has twelve tracks, which were written by lead vocalist Deborah Conway, drummer Dorland Bray, bass guitarist Helen Carter and guitarist Stephen Philip.

== Recording ==
Conway said producer Rushent, "worked his arse off to get the best possible sound that he could get. It was mostly a happy experience but the cracks were beginning to show in the camaraderie of the band. There were fights, some nastiness and a little bit of violence. And I think it was me against the other three."

== Track listing ==
All tracks were written by Deborah Conway, Dorland Bray, Helen Carter and Stephen Philip, except where indicated.

1. "Haunt You"
2. "King of Moomba"
3. "Adultery" (Bray, Carter, Philip)
4. "Valentine's Day"
5. "Take Me Anywhere" (Bray, Carter, Philip)
6. "Heads Will Roll"
7. "Disneyland"
8. "Wild and Blue" (Conway, Carter, Philip)
9. "Desert Song"
10. "Friends Like You" (Bray, Carter, Philip)
11. "That Hanging Business" (Bray, Carter, Philip)
12. "The Happiest Place in Town" (Philip, Bray)

== Charts ==
| Chart (1988) | Peak position |
|---|---|
| Australia (Kent Music Report) | 24 |

== Personnel ==
Do-Ré-Mi members

- Dorland Bray — drums, percussion, backing vocals
- Helen Carter — bass guitar, backing vocals
- Deborah Conway — lead vocalist
- Stephen Philip — guitar

Additional musicians

- Alan Dunn — piano accordion
- Johnny Mars — harmonica
- Bob Noble — piano, keyboards, organ (Hammond)
- Frank Ricotti — trumpet
- Steve Sidwell — piccolo trumpet
- John Thirkell — trumpet
- Philip Todd — saxophone (tenor)

Recording details

- Producer — Martin Rushent
