= Robert Penn (musician) =

American blues musician

Robert Penn is an American blues musician.

Born in Riverside, California, United States, he moved to the Detroit, Michigan area at a young age. He is notable for having performed with a wide variety of well-known musicians including B.B. King, Aretha Franklin and Ray Charles, for leading the Robert Penn Blues Band, and for being an international blues performer.
