= Boogie Woogie Red =

American songwriter

- Born: Vernon Harrison; October 18, 1925; Rayville, Louisiana, United States
- Died: July 2, 1992 (aged 66) Detroit, Michigan, United States
- Genres: Detroit blues, boogie-woogie, jazz
- Occupations: Pianist, singer, songwriter
- Instruments: Piano, vocals
- Years active: 1945–1992
- Label: Blind Pig Records

Boogie Woogie Red (October 18, 1925 – July 2, 1992) was an American Detroit blues, boogie-woogie and jazz pianist, singer and songwriter. At different times he worked with Sonny Boy Williamson I, Washboard Willie, Baby Boy Warren, Lonnie Johnson, Tampa Red, John Lee Hooker and Memphis Slim.

== Biography ==
He was born Vernon Harrison in Rayville, Louisiana, and moved to Detroit in 1927. In his adolescence, he began performing in local clubs and worked alongside Sonny Boy Williamson I, Baby Boy Warren and John Lee Hooker.

In the mid-1970s, Boogie Woogie Red played solo piano at the Blind Pig, a small bar in Ann Arbor, Michigan. He recorded his own albums in 1974 and 1977 and toured Europe in that decade. Red appeared on BBC Television's Old Grey Whistle Test in May 1973.

He died in July 1992, at the age of 66, in Detroit.

== Discography ==
- Live at the Blind Pig (1974), Blind Pig Records
- Red Hot (1977), Blind Pig Records

== See also ==
- List of boogie woogie musicians
- List of Detroit blues musicians
