= Little Sonny =

American singer

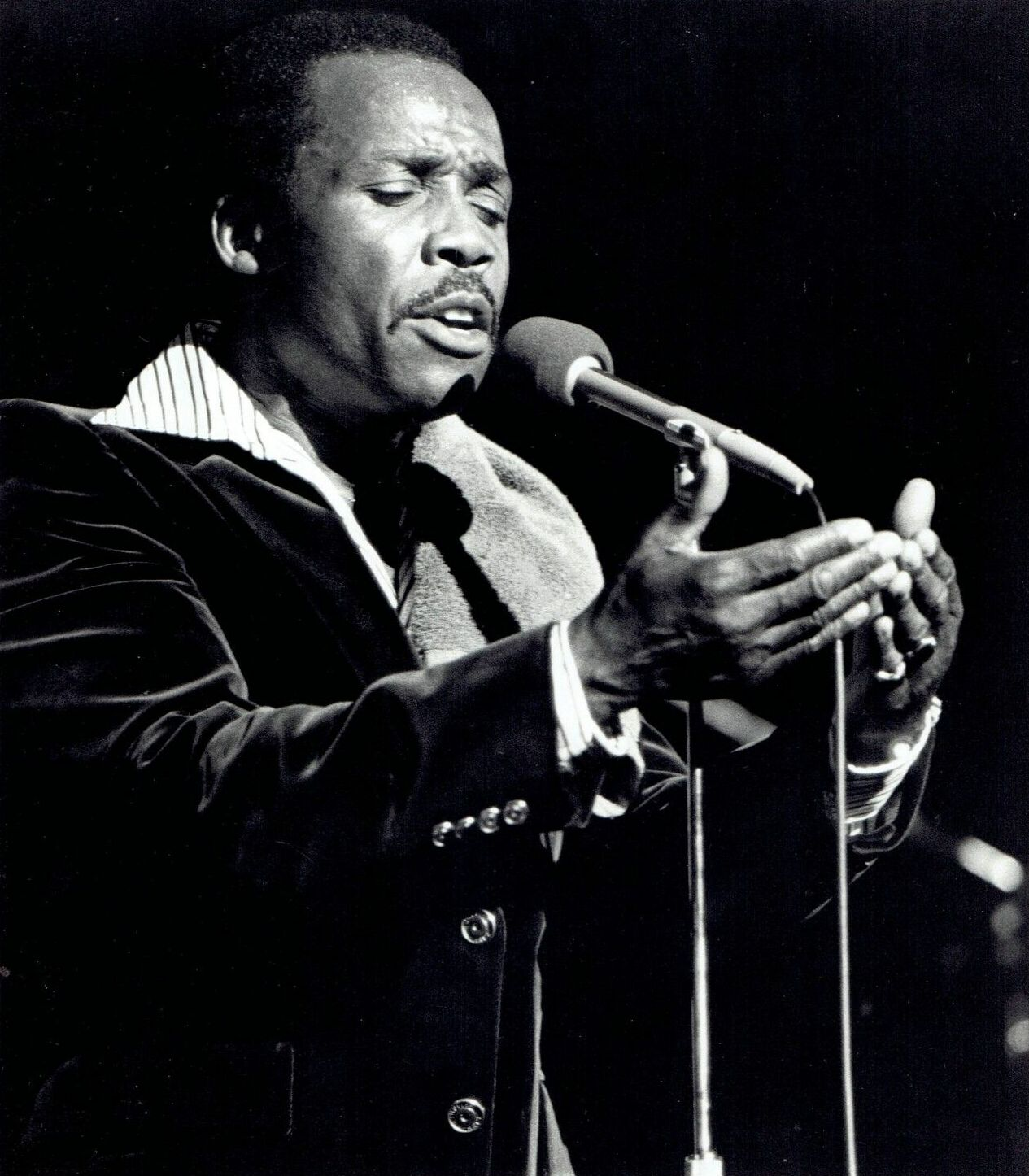
- Sonny, c. 1981

Background information
- Born: Aaron Willis; October 6, 1932 (age 93); Greensboro, Alabama, United States
- Genres: Electric blues
- Occupations: Musician, harmonicist, singer, songwriter, photographer
- Instrument(s): Harmonica, vocals
- Years active: 1952–present
- Labels: Stax, Sequel, P-Vine

Little Sonny (born Aaron Willis; October 6, 1932, in Greensboro, Alabama) is an American electric blues harmonica player, singer and songwriter. His early mentor and inspiration was Sonny Boy Williamson II. Nevertheless, Little Sonny stated that his nickname was originated by his mother: "[She] called me 'Sonny boy' from the time I can remember." He has released eight albums, including three for a subsidiary of Stax Records. His 1973 release, Hard Goin' Up, reached the Top 50 in the Billboard R&B chart.

== Biography ==
Willis was born in 1932 and raised solely by his mother. He relocated to Detroit in 1953. He had no real interest in music, he said, "But then I saw Sonny Boy Williamson II." Willis was "spellbound at the way he played. After the show I went home and practiced for hours. Every day after that I would practice until I got the sound I wanted." His daytime job was working in a used car lot.

His first professional appearance was at the Good Times Bar in Detroit, playing in Washboard Willie's backing group. He put together his first band in March 1956. For the following fifteen years he performed in numerous Detroit clubs, often boosting his earnings by photographing customers between his performances on stage. He often performed with John Lee Hooker, Eddie Kirkland and Baby Boy Warren. Another club stalwart, Eddie "Guitar" Burns, accompanied him on Little Sonny's debut single, "I Gotta Find My Baby" (1958), released by Duke Records. It was co-written by Little Sonny's wife, Maggie. His follow-up release, "Love Shock", was for Excello Records. He received $25 for that track. He then established his own label, Speedway Records, and sold enough copies of his next single, "The Mix Up", to pay his production costs.

Home-recording his own tracks, in 1966 he leased "The Creeper" and "Latin Soul" to Revilot Records. A later track, "Sonny's Bag", became his first Top 20 hit in Detroit. By late 1969, Little Sonny recorded his debut album, the predominantly instrumental New King of Blues Harmonica, which he cut in less than six hours. It was released by Enterprise, a subsidiary of Stax Records. Despite their reputation for soul music productions, Little Sonny released three albums for the label in the early 1970s. He also briefly appeared in the Stax stadium concert film, Wattstax.

Black & Blue (1971) and Hard Goin' Up (1973) followed, with Little Sonny using an Old Standby 34B harmonica. A lean period ensued, until the British label Sequel Records issued Sonny Side Up in 1995. His accompanists included the keyboard player Rudy Robinson, a regular session musician in Detroit in the 1960s and 1970s, and the guitarist Aaron Willis, Jr., Little Sonny's son, who had both played on Hard Goin' Up over 20 years earlier.

Little Sonny performed at Black Hills State University on June 24, 2000.

His photograph collection, housed in the basement of his Detroit home, includes shots of John Lee Hooker, Eddie "Guitar" Burns, Eddie Kirkland, Joe Hunter, Eddie Willis, Bobby Bland, Washboard Willie, and Sonny Boy Williamson II. Little Sonny performed on October 4, 2008, at the Motor City Blues & Boogie Woogie Festival, in Detroit, with Eddie "Guitar" Burns, Otis Clay and Bobby Rush.

== Discography ==
- New King of Blues Harmonica (1970), Enterprise/Stax
- Black & Blue (1971), Enterprise/Stax (reissued in 1992)
- Hard Goin' Up (1973), Enterprise/Stax (number 42, Billboard R&B chart)
- Ann Arbor Blues & Jazz Festival, Vol. 2: Blues with a Feeling (1995), Schoolkids (live album)
- Sonny Side Up (1995), Sequel (UK)
- Blues with a Feeling (1996), Sequel (UK)
- Live in Japan 1994 (1997), P-Vine
- The Best Love I've Ever Had (2003), P-Vine
