= Baby Boy Warren =

American blues singer and guitarist (1919–1977)

- Also known as: Johnny Williams
- Born: Robert Henry Warren; August 13, 1919; Lake Providence, Louisiana, U.S.
- Died: July 1, 1977 (aged 57) Detroit, Michigan, U.S.
- Genres: Blues
- Occupation: Musician
- Instruments: Vocals; guitar
- Years active: 1931–1976

Robert Henry "Baby Boy" Warren (August 13, 1919 – July 1, 1977), was an American blues singer and guitarist who was a leading figure on the Detroit blues scene in the 1950s.

== Early life ==
Warren was born in Lake Providence, Louisiana, in 1919, and at the age of three months moved with his parents to Memphis, Tennessee. He was interested in music from an early age and was working occasionally as a musician from around 1931, when he dropped out of school, having learned to play guitar from two of his older brothers. In the 1930s, he worked in W. C. Handy Park, Memphis, with Howling Wolf, Robert Jr. Lockwood and Little Buddy Doyle and he appeared on the radio show King Biscuit Time, broadcast from Helena, Arkansas, with Sonny Boy Williamson around 1941. In 1942, he moved to Detroit, where he worked for General Motors while also performing as a musician.

== Recordings ==
Warren's first recording sessions were in 1949 and 1950 in Detroit, with the five resulting singles being released on a number of labels. Tracks recorded at a 1954 session accompanied by Sonny Boy Williamson were released on Joe Von Battle's JVB label and by Excello Records. Further sessions the same year resulted in a single on the Blue Lake label, with Boogie Woogie Red on piano and Calvin Frazier on guitar, and a reworking of the Robert Johnson song "Stop Breakin' Down" for the Drummond label.

== Later career and death ==
Warren was mostly inactive in music in the 1960s but revived his career with performances at the Detroit Blues Festival in 1971 and the Ann Arbor Blues Festival in 1973 and with a tour of Europe with Boogie Woogie Red in 1972. From 1974 to 1976 he was also a featured performer, along with Willie D. Warren, with the Progressive Blues Band, a popular band that played in many of Detroit's blues venues.

He suffered a fatal heart attack at his home on July 1, 1977, and was buried at Detroit Memorial Park Cemetery in Macomb County, Michigan.

== Personal information ==
Warren was given the nickname "Baby Boy" by his older brothers when he was a child. He was one of twelve children. He married twice, in 1935 and in the early 1960s, and had seven children. On releases by Staff Records, Federal Records and Swing Time Records, he was credited as Johnny Williams.

== Influences ==
Warren's chief influences were Little Buddy Doyle and Willie "61" Blackwell, especially in his approach to lyrics. He stated that another musician he particularly admired was Memphis Minnie, whom he knew in Memphis in the 1930s. The Penguin Guide to Blues Recordings described him as having brought "a hip, literate humour to the blues lyric".
