= Idiot Grin =

- 7" single cover

Single by Do-Ré-Mi

from the album Domestic Harmony
- A-side: "Idiot Grin"
- B-side: "No Fury"
- Released: August 1985
- Recorded: London; January/February 1985
- Genre: New wave, rock
- Length: 2:26
- Label: Virgin Records
- Songwriter(s): Deborah Conway, Dorland Bray, Helen Carter, Stephen Philip
- Producer(s): Gavin MacKillop

Do-Ré-Mi singles chronology
"Man Overboard" (1985)	"Idiot Grin" (1985)	"Warnings Moving Clockwise" (1985)

"Idiot Grin" is a song by Australian rock/pop group Do-Re-Mi released by Virgin Records in August 1985 as the second single from their debut studio album. The song peaked at number 43 in Australia.

== Track listing ==
All tracks were written by Deborah Conway, Dorland Bray, Helen Carter and Stephen Philip.

1. "Idiot Grin" - 2:26
2. "No Fury" - 2:58

== Charts ==
Chart (1985)	Peak position
Australia (Kent Music Report)	43

== Personnel ==
Do-Ré-Mi members

- Dorland Bray — drums, percussion, backing vocals
- Helen Carter — bass guitar, backing vocals
- Deborah Conway — lead vocalist
- Steve Hogarth — keyboards
- Stephen Philip — guitar

Additional musicians

- Roger Freeman — trombone

Recording details

- Producer, engineer — Gavin MacKillop
  - Assistant engineer — Chris Potter, Mike Bigwood, Steve Chase
- Studio — Townhouse III Studios, London

Art work

- Cover — Greg Hollister (front cover illustration), Shelley Conway (lino cuts)
