= Michael Roach (musician) =

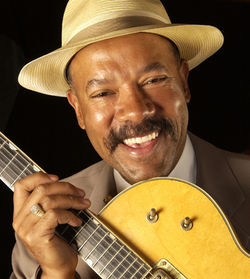
- Michael Roach

Background information
- Born: March 18, 1955 (age 70); Washington, D.C., U.S.
- Genres: Piedmont blues
- Occupation: Musician
- Instrument: Guitar
- Website: michaelroach.com

Michael Roach (born March 18, 1955, Washington, D.C., United States) is an American blues performer and educator based in England, who has released six albums on the independent Stella Records label. He conducts workshops on African American musical/cultural heritage internationally, and is a founder of the European Blues Association.

== Career ==
In 1941, Roach's parents moved from South Carolina to Washington, D.C., where the twenty-seven-year-old Roach later heard regional musicians John Jackson, John Cephas and Archie Edwards, who became his mentors in traditional Piedmont blues guitar.

Upon relocating to the UK, Roach became active on the European blues scene, and founded the European Blues Association (EBA) with writer/historian Dr. Paul Oliver, MBE in 1997. The European Blues Association became a registered charity in 2002, and Roach currently serves as its director.

In 2000, Michael Roach founded "Blues Week", an annual residential program of lectures and instruction in country blues guitar, harmonica, blues piano and vocals at Northampton University (UK). In 2003, Roach presented Deep Blue, a three-part series on blues music featured on BBC Radio 4. In 2006 he released an instructional DVD, Introduction to Country Blues Guitar.

Roach's tours as an educator and performer have taken him to the Augusta Heritage Center (US), Centrum Piedmont Blues Intensive (US), The Ironworks (UK) and the Smithsonian Institution (US). He has performed and lectured at blues, jazz, folk and roots music festivals in Croatia, Czech Republic, England, the United States, the United Arab Emirates, and Wales.

== Discography ==
- 1993 – Ain't Got Me No Home (Stella Records)
- 1997 – The Blinds of Life (Stella Records)
- 2000 – Good News Blues (Stella Records)
- 2003 – Cypress Grove (Stella Records)
- 2006 – I Betcha ! (Stella Records)
- 2010 – Innocent Child (Stella Records)
