= Willie "61" Blackwell =

- Blackwell in 1971

Background information
- Born: December 25, 1905; La Grange, Tennessee, U.S.
- Died: after March 1972 possibly Memphis, Tennessee, U.S.
- Genres: Country blues
- Occupation: Musician
- Instruments: Vocal; Guitar; Piano

Willie "61" Blackwell (December 25, 1905 – after March 1972) was an American country blues guitarist and pianist. As an iterinant performer who played mainly on street corners and juke joints, Blackwell did not have a prolific career, but did record with musicologist Alan Lomax in 1942 and was rediscovered during the blues revival of the 1960s.

== Biography ==
Blackwell was born in LaGrange, Tennessee, United States. He was introduced to the basics of the guitar by his father and neighbors, but, until the late 1930s, Blackwell performed on the piano in juke joints in Memphis, Tennessee. According to Blackwell's account however, after winning a competition against a rival musician, his adversary's friends beat Blackwell, crippling his hands. Undeterred and still hoping to pursue his music career, Blackwell reacquainted himself with the guitar, and allegedly received lessons from renowned blues musician Robert Johnson.

Travelling on Route 61, Blackwell became an iterinant musician, earning himself the nickname "61" for his regular use of the route as he performed up and down the Mississippi Valley and in New Orleans. In 1942, while on Beale Street in Memphis with fellow musician William Brown, Blackwell met Alan Lomax, a musicologist collecting field recordings of authentic country blues. Admittedly, Lomax was more interested in recording Brown than Blackwell who had taken to drinking moonshine, making it difficult for him to stay awake. From Lomax's own account in his book The Land Where the Blues Began, he took Blackwell and Brown to an Arkansas plantation in July 1942 to escape persecution from police for associating with the black musicians.

Lomax recorded eight songs with Blackwell which were released on Bluebird Records and preserved by the Library of Congress. Following the session with Lomax, Blackwell never recorded again and kept a low profile, but his work was later rediscovered in the 1960s by blues historians Sam Stark and Ron Harwood, the latter of whom wrote about Blackwell in Jazz Journal, in 1967.

Blackwell died in 1972, more specifically after March that year, possibly in Memphis, Tennessee. In 1994, all of his songs were featured on the compilation album, Carl Martin / Willie "61" Blackwell - Complete Recorded Works in Chronological Order, released by Document Records.
