= The Happiest Place in Town (song) =

- 7" single cover

Single by Do-Ré-Mi

from the album The Happiest Place in Town
- A-side: "Happiest Place in Town"
- B-side: "Take Me Anywhere"
- Released: 30 May 1988
- Genre: New wave, rock
- Label: Virgin Records
- Songwriters: Stephen Philip, Dorland Bray
- Producer: Martin Rushent

Do-Ré-Mi singles chronology
"Haunt You" (1988)	"The Happiest Place in Town" (1988)

"The Happiest Place in Town" is a song by Australian rock/pop group Do-Ré-Mi released by Virgin Records in May 1988 as the fourth and final single, from their second studio album The Happiest Place in Town.

The photograph on the artwork features a shot of an old style pinball parlour with the phrase "the happiest place in town" on the awning. The parlour was located on George Street in Sydney, near the intersection with Rawson Place (which is evidenced by the traffic signal seen in the cover art photograph) and near the Great Southern Hotel.

== Track listing ==
1. "The Happiest Place in Town" (Dorland Bray, Stephen Philip)
2. "Take Me Anywhere" (Bray, Helen Carter, Philip)

== Personnel ==
Do-Ré-Mi members

- Dorland Bray — drums, percussion, backing vocals
- Helen Carter — bass guitar, backing vocals
- Deborah Conway — lead vocalist
- Stephen Philip — guitar

Recording details

- Producer — Martin Rushent
