= Big Bear Records =

British record label

- Founded: 1968
- Founder: Jim Simpson
- Genre: Blues, jazz, swing
- Country of origin: UK
- Location: Birmingham, England
- Official website: www.bigbearmusic.com

Big Bear Records is a British record label set up in 1968 by Jim Simpson in Birmingham, England. It specialises in blues and jazz recordings.

== History ==
Big Bear Records was founded by promoter and band manager Jim Simpson in 1968, taking its name from the nickname given to Simpson by Radio 1 DJ John Peel. At the time, Simpson was managing The Locomotive, who had just scored a top 40 hit with "Rudi's in Love". After Parlophone, the band's existing label, declined to release the planned follow-up recording "Rudi The Red Nosed Reindeer", Simpson decided to set up his own Big Bear Records label to release the single (with the band renamed Steam Shovel for contractual reasons), with initial distribution from Island Records.

During 1968, Simpson established the weekly Henry's Blueshouse club night at The Crown Hotel on Station Street in Birmingham. Early members of the club included Ozzy Osbourne and Tony Iommi, who one week approached Simpson to request a support slot at a future gig for their band, then known as Earth. Simpson would go on to manage Earth, who soon changed their name to Black Sabbath. Under Simpson's management, they reached number one on the album chart with Paranoid, before leaving him in 1970.

Following this, Simpson began to focus his attention on recording and touring American bluesmen, under the billing American Blues Legends. Featuring musicians including Tommy Tucker, Willie Mabon, Homesick James, Doctor Ross, Snooky Pryor, Cousin Joe, Eddie "Guitar" Burns, Champion Jack Dupree and Eddie "Playboy" Taylor, Big Bear released a total of 21 albums of American blues during the 1970s.

The 1980s saw Big Bear Records returning to Simpson's first love, mainstream jazz and swing. Assembling a lineup of leading British jazz musicians including Humphrey Lyttelton, Dick Morrissey, Digby Fairweather, Dave Shepherd and Jim Douglas, Big Bear promoted a live jam session on 12 August 1984 at Birmingham's Cannon Hill Park, recorded and released on LP as The M&B Jam Session. The success of the event provided the impetus for the first Birmingham International Jazz Festival the following summer, which continues to be organised annually by Big Bear Music every July. In 1987, Big Bear launched The Jazz Rag magazine, which continues to publish bi-monthly, as well as The British Jazz Awards. The first edition of the awards was marked with a ceremony at Birmingham's Grand Hotel, where the jam session featuring the poll winners was recorded and released as the British Jazz Awards 1987 album.

Big Bear Records continued to work with prominent names in British jazz into the 1990s, releasing albums by Lady Sings The Blues (fronted by Val Wiseman), Kenny Baker's Dozen, Bruce Adams and Alan Barnes.

== Discography ==
Year released	Artist	Title	Catalogue number
1968	Steam Shovel	Rudi the Red-Nosed Reindeer	TR-635
1972	Eddie "Guitar" Burns	Bottle Up and Go	BEAR 16, Action ACMP 100
1972	Johnny Mars	Blues from Mars	BEAR 17, Polydor 2460 168
1972	Doctor Ross	Live at Montreux	BEAR 18, Polydor 2460 169
1972	Gene Conners with Mickey Baker	Let the Good Times Roll	BEAR 19, Polydor 2460 185
1973	Various Artists	American Blues Legends '73	BEAR 20, Polydor 2460 186
1973	Homesick James & Snooky Pryor	Homesick James & Snooky Pryor	BEAR 21, Caroline C 1502, INT 146.404, BRP 2002
1974	Doctor Ross	The Harmonica Boss	BEAR 2, Munich 150 201, INT 146.403, BRP 2013
1974	Various Artists	American Blues Legends '74	BEAR 1, Munich 150 202
1974	Eddie "Playboy" Taylor	Ready for Eddie	BEAR 6, Munich 150 203, INT 146.407
1974	Cousin Joe	Gospel-Wailing...Blues Man from New Orleans	BEAR 3
1974	Big John Wrencher	Big John's Boogie	BEAR 4, INT 146.402
1975	Mickey Baker	Take a Look Inside	BEAR 5, INT 146.408
1975	Eddie "Guitar" Burns	Detroit Blackbottom	BEAR 7
1975	Various Artists	American Blues Legends '75	BEAR 8
1975	Willie Mabon	The Comeback	BEAR 9
1975	Homesick James	Home Sweet Homesick James	BEAR 10
1976	Erwin Helfer	Boogie Piano Chicago Style	BEAR 11, INT 146.401, BRP 2003
1976	Johnny Mars	Oakland Boogie	BEAR 12, INT 146.405
1976	Clark Terry's Big Bad Band	Live on 57th Street	BEAR 13
1976	Snooky Pryor	Shake Your Boogie	BEAR 14, INT 146.406, BRP 2033
1976	Doctor Ross	Jivin' the Blues	BEAR 15, INT 146.409
1976	Muscles	Muscles	BEAR 24, BB 1001, INT 161.400
1979	Various Artists	American Blues Legends '79	BEAR 23, INT 146.410
1980	Claude Williams	Kansas City Giants	BEAR 25
1980	Various Artists	Brum Beat – Live at the Barrel Organ!	BRUM 1
1985	Various Artists	M&B Jam Session Volume 1	BEAR 26
1988	Various Artists	Mitchells and Butler's British Jazz Awards 1987	BEAR 27
1988	Duncan Swift	Out Looking for the Lion	BEAR 28
1988	Groove Juice Special	Groove Juice Comin' To Town	BEAR 29
1988	King Pleasure & The Biscuit Boys	King Pleasure & The Biscuit Boys	BEAR 30
1990	Bill Allred's Goodtime Jazz Band	Swing That Music!	BEAR 31
1990	King Pleasure & The Biscuit Boys	This Is It!	BEAR 32
1990	Lady Sings The Blues	Lady Sings The Blues	BEAR 33
1991	Duncan Swift	The Broadwood Concert	BEAR 34
1991	King Pleasure & The Biscuit Boys	Better Beware!	BEAR 35
1992	Bruce Adams Quartet	One Foot in the Gutter	BEARCD36
1993	King Pleasure & The Biscuit Boys	Live at Ronnie Scotts Birmingham	BEARCD37
1993	Bruce Adams/Alan Barnes Quintet	Side-Steppin'	BEARCD38
1994	Kenny Baker's Dozen	The Boss Is Home	BEARCD39
1995	King Pleasure & The Biscuit Boys	Blues & Rhythm Revue, Vol 1	BEARCD40
1995	Bruce Adams/Alan Barnes Quintet	Let's Face The Music	BEARCD41
1998	King Pleasure & The Biscuit Boys	Smack Dab in the Middle	BEARCD42
2002	King Pleasure & The Biscuit Boys	Let 'Em Roll	BEARCD43
2004	Alan Barnes' All Stars	The Marbella Jazz Suite	BEARCD44
2006	The Doctor Teeth Big Band	Rhythm Is Our Business	BEARCD45
2006	King Pleasure & The Biscuit Boys	Hey Puerto Rico!	BEARCD46
2007	Tipitina	I Wish I Was in New Orleans	BEARCD47
2009	Django's Castle with Bruce Adams	Swing Hotel du Vin	BEARCD48
2009	Nomy Rosenberg Trio	Nomy Rosenberg Trio	BEARCD49
2010	King Pleasure & The Biscuit Boys	Live at Last	BEARCD50
2012	Tipitina	Taking Care of Business	BEARCD51
2012	The Will Johns Band	Hooks & Lines	BEARCD52
2013	Remi Harris	Ninick	BEARCD53
2015	The Whiskey Brothers	Bottle Up And Go	BEARCD54
2016	Lady Sings The Blues	Laughing at Life	BEARCD55
2017	Various Artists	Jazz City UK: Volume 1	BEARCD56
2018	Various Artists	Jazz City UK: Volume 2	BEARCD57
2018	Howard McCrary	Moments Like This	BEARCD58
2020	Chick Willis	Things I Used to Do	BEARCD59
2025	Earth (Black Sabbath)	The Legendary Lost Tapes	BEARCD60

== See also ==
- List of record labels
