= Do-Re-Mi (band) =

Australian band

Do-Ré-Mi
- Do-Ré-Mi, 1985 publicity shot From left to right: Stephen Philip, Helen Carter, Deborah Conway, Dorland Bray

Background information
- Origin: Sydney, New South Wales, Australia
- Genres: Pop rock, new wave
- Years active: 1981–1988, 2018–present
- Labels: Green Records, Larrikan Records, Virgin, Laneway Music
- Members: Helen Carter; Deborah Conway; Dorland Bray; Stephen Philip

Do-Ré-Mi (often typeset as Do-Re-Mi or Do Re Mi) are an Australian pop rock band formed in Sydney in 1981 by Deborah Conway (lead vocals), Dorland Bray (drums, percussion, backing vocals), Helen Carter (bass, backing vocals) and Stephen Philip (guitar). They were one of Australia's most respected and successful post-punk groups. Do-Ré-Mi recorded self-titled EP and The Waiting Room for independent label Green Records before signing to Virgin Records and recording their first LP, Domestic Harmony in 1985 with Gavin MacKillop producing. Domestic Harmony achieved gold sales and contained their most played song, "Man Overboard", which was a top 5 hit single in 1985. This song was notable for its lyrical references to penis envy and pubic hair. Do-Ré-Mi's follow-up singles Idiot Grin and Warnings Moving Clockwise reached the Top 100.

Their second album, The Happiest Place in Town, produced by Martin Rushent, included the singles "Adultery", "King of Moomba" and "Haunt You", all of which reached the Australian top 100. The band chose to take an extended break in 1988, with Conway pursuing a solo career, and ended up permanently disbanding later in the decade.

== Career ==
=== Previous bands ===
One of Dorland Bray's first groups was Shotgun Willie. They played several gigs in the Melbourne pub scene, mainly performing country material gathered from artists such as the relatively unknown Delbert McClinton and Willie Nelson.

Conway and Bray were both in Melbourne-based band The Benders with Neville Aresca, Les Barker, John Campbell, Daniel Solowiej and Greg Thomas. Before joining The Benders, Bray had been in punk rock group the News. Vocalist Conway joined The Benders in 1979 whilst still at Melbourne University. The Benders performed mostly in Melbourne and gigged around pubs playing original material (mostly written by Conway and Thomas) and Blondie and Devo covers. Conway and Bray also wrote songs together. In Sydney, Philip had been a guitarist for The Thought Criminals and was also a session musician. Carter was a member of punk band Friction. Carter had been living with punk rocker Roger Grierson of The Thought Criminals (later an executive of Festival Mushroom Records).

when the boys were taking a break at rehearsal one day, I picked up the bass guitar for the first time.

— Helen Carter, 2004

=== 1981-1988: Do-Ré-Mi ===
Bray and Conway left Melbourne for Sydney in 1981, forming Do-Ré-Mi with Carter. In July 1982 Do-Ré-Mi recorded some tracks for a self-titled 12" EP using Philip as a session musician. Philip formally joined the band by the time of the EP's release in August 1982 on independent label Green Records. In line with the core post-1960s principle that the personal is political, the band's first recording featured a spiky-funk sound working under passionate, personal-political songs, which included the anti-cold war track "Standing on Wires".

Conway had lived with Paul Hester drummer in Deckchairs Overboard (later in Split Enz and Crowded House). Hester guested on timbales for "(Just Like) Hercules", a track on their second 12" EP, released by Green Records in January 1983, The Waiting Room.

Do-Ré-Mi were signed by Virgin Records after being spotted by the management of Cold Chisel and The Angels. Do-Ré-Mi recorded two LP albums: Domestic Harmony (1985) and The Happiest Place in Town (1988) and seven singles for Virgin Records. Both albums were recorded in London, Domestic Harmony had Gavin McKillop producing and peaked at No. 16 on the Australian albums charts;. Martin Rushent produced The Happiest Place in Town.

Their best known hit, "Man Overboard" originally appeared on their 1983 EP The Waiting Room. They re-recorded "Man Overboard" for Domestic Harmony and the track was released as a single in May 1985. It peaked at No. 5 on the Australian singles chart. "Man Overboard" was the 8th highest Australian song for 1985 End of Year Chart.

In the Australian Broadcasting Corporation 2001 TV series Long Way to the Top Carter described the delight Do-Ré-Mi had in the success of this single, which came despite the concerns of their record company:

There was a real hit-maker mentality [...] people would say 'It can't be a hit – it doesn't have a chorus [...] You're talking about pubic hair, oh my God!'

— Helen Carter, 2001

In 1985 Do-Ré-Mi performed three songs for the Oz for Africa concert as part of the global Live Aid program – "Man Overboard", "Warnings Moving Clockwise" and "1000 Mouths". It was broadcast in Australia (on both the Seven Network and Nine Network) and on MTV in the US.

Not long after their second album was released in February 1988, Do-Ré-Mi travelled to the United Kingdom to begin recording a third album. Before this was finished Virgin Records offered Conway a solo deal and Do-Ré-Mi disbanded.

== Subsequent careers ==
Bray became a member of Ghostwriters for their first album Ghostwriters (1991). Carter and Philip wrote and performed together first with short lived Lupi and later (c. 2001) in Underfelt. Philip wrote soundscapes for a number of theatre productions of Macbeth, featuring David Field at the Performance Space in Sydney, and produced for Peter Milton Walsh and Grant McLennan.

Conway has a successful solo career, winning an ARIA award for her first solo album String of Pearls in 1991 (co-writing three songs with Bray). Her best known solo hit was 1991's "It's Only the Beginning" reaching No. 19. Conway is still involved in musical activities with a 2007 version of Broad. Thought Criminals reformed in February 2006: see Official website.

== Reunion ==
In 2018, Carter, Conway and Philip reformed Do Re Mi to perform at the inaugural Australian Women in Music Awards ceremony in Brisbane. Carter and Conway decided to continue with the reunion after being approached to be a part of the by the C concert series. The group, alongside new members Bridie O’Brien (guitar), Julia Day (drums) and Clio Renner (keyboards), would go on to announce a run of headlining shows for 2019.

== Covers and others ==
"Man Overboard" was used for He Died with a Felafel in His Hand (2001) performed by Conway and Wicked Beat Sound System. It was also recorded by the band george (with Conway guesting) for their 2004 EP Still Real.

"Standing on Wires" was used for Australian TV series Love My Way (2004–2007) episode 2.03.

== Discography ==
=== Studio albums ===
List of albums, with Australian chart positions
Title	Album details	Peak chart positions	Certification
Title	Album details	AUS	Certification
Domestic Harmony	Released: July 1985; Label: Virgin (VOZ 2001)	6	AUS: Gold
The Happiest Place in Town	Released: August 1988; Label: Virgin (V 2467)	24	

=== Extended plays ===
List of EPs with Australian details
Title	EP details
Do-Ré-Mi	Released: August 1982; Label: Green (LRM-680)
The Waiting Room	Released: January 1983; Label: Larrikin (LRM117)

=== Singles ===
Year	Single	Peak chart positions	Album
Year	Single	AUS	Album
1985	"Man Overboard"	5	Domestic Harmony
1985	"Idiot Grin"	43	Domestic Harmony
1985	"Warnings Moving Clockwise"	72	Domestic Harmony
1986	"Guns and Butter"	48	non album single
1987	"Adultery"	27	The Happiest Place in Town
1988	"King of Moomba"	52	The Happiest Place in Town
1988	"The Happiest Place in Town"	-	The Happiest Place in Town
1988	"Haunt You"	91	The Happiest Place in Town

== Awards and nominations ==
=== Countdown Music Awards ===
Countdown was an Australian pop music TV series on national broadcaster ABC-TV from 1974 to 1987, it presented music awards from 1979 to 1987, initially in conjunction with magazine TV Week. The TV Week / Countdown Awards were a combination of popular-voted and peer-voted awards.

Year	Nominee / work	Award	Result
1985	Domestic Harmony	Best Debut Album	Won
1985	"Man Overboard"	Best Debut Single	Won
1985	Themselves	Most Promising Talent	Won
1986	Deborah Conway in "Guns & Butter" by Do-Re-Mi	Best Female Performance in a Video	Nominated

=== ARIA Music Awards ===
The ARIA Music Awards is an annual awards ceremony that recognises excellence, innovation, and achievement across all genres of Australian music. They commenced in 1987.

Year	Nominee / work	Award	Result
1987	"Guns and Butter"	Highest Selling Single	Nominated
