= Eddie "Guitar" Burns =

American Detroit blues musician

- Burns in the 1970s

Background information
- Also known as: Big Daddy; Little Eddie; Big Ed
- Born: February 8, 1928; Belzoni, Mississippi, U.S.
- Origin: Detroit, Michigan, U.S.
- Died: December 12, 2012 (aged 84) Detroit, Michigan, U.S.
- Genres: Detroit blues
- Occupations: Musician; songwriter
- Instruments: Guitar; harmonica; vocals
- Years active: 1948–2012

Eddie "Guitar" Burns (February 8, 1928 – December 12, 2012) was an American Detroit blues guitarist, harmonica player, and singer and songwriter. Among Detroit bluesmen, Burns was deemed to have been exceeded in stature by only John Lee Hooker.

== Biography ==
Burns was born in Belzoni, Mississippi. His father was a sharecropper who performed as a singer in medicine shows, but Burns was raised mainly by his grandparents. He was self-taught in playing the harmonica and made his first guitar.

Burns was initially influenced by the music of Sonny Boy Williamson I and Big Bill Broonzy. He relocated from the Mississippi Delta via Waterloo, Iowa, to Detroit in 1948. Originally Burns excelled at playing the harmonica, and his debut single, "Notoriety Woman" (1948), featured this ability accompanied by the guitar playing of John T. Smith. Burns told of meeting John Lee Hooker there: "Well see, John T. and me was playing at a house party this particular Saturday night. We was in Detroit Black Bottom. ... so Hooker was on his way home from somewhere – I guess he was at some other party, house parties used to be real plentiful here. Hooker heard it, knocked at the door, and they let him in. He introduced himself and he sat down and played some with us. And then, he liked the way I was blowing harmonica. ... he had a session coming up on Tuesday, this was on a Saturday. And so then, he wanted to know if I wanted to do this session with him on Tuesday. And I told him, yes, naturally. So that's how John T. and me went down to cut for Hooker. When we got through the man wanted to know what I had. I had one song, 'Notoriety Woman.' And so he said I'd need two, and I sat there and made up 'Papa's Boogie.'" By the following year Burns was playing guitar accompaniment on recordings by Hooker.

Billed as Big Daddy, Little Eddie, or Big Ed, he performed regularly in Detroit nightclubs but had to supplement his earnings by working as a mechanic. In those early years Burns's own recording was not prolific, with just a handful of tracks released on several labels. His output veered from Detroit blues to R&B as the 1960s progressed, when he issued a number of singles for Harvey Fuqua's Harvey Records. Now permanently billed as Eddie "Guitar" Burns, he appeared on Hooker's album The Real Folk Blues (1966).

In 1972, Burns undertook a European tour and recorded his debut album, Bottle Up & Go, in London, both organised by Jim Simpson of Big Bear Records, who was the first to insert the epithet "guitar" into Burns's name. This was followed by an appearance at the Ann Arbor Blues and Jazz Festival in 1973. Two years later he toured Europe again, this time as part of Big Bear's American Blues Legends '75 tour, featuring on the album of the same name and cutting the Detroit Blackbottom LP as leader.

A song he wrote, "Orange Driver", was recorded by the J. Geils Band for its album Hotline (1975). In August 1976, Burns performed his song "Bottle Up & Go" live on the British television program So It Goes.

In 1989 Burns released the album Detroit for Blue Suit Records, in which his abilities on both guitar and harmonica were displayed. In February 1992, Burns appeared alongside Jack Owens, Bud Spires, and Lonnie Pitchford at the seventh annual New York Winter Blues Festival. By 1994, Burns had been granted the Michigan Heritage Award.

In 1998, the Detroit Blues Society presented Burns with its Lifetime Achievement Award.

His brother Jimmy Burns is a soul blues musician who lives in Chicago and played guitar on Burns's 2002 album Snake Eyes. Burns's final record was Second Degree Burns, released when he was 77 years old.

In 2008, Little Sonny performed with Burns at the Motor City Blues & Boogie Woogie Festival. It was Burns's final live performance.

Burns died in Detroit on December 12, 2012, aged 84.

== Discography ==
=== Studio albums ===
- Bottle Up & Go (1972), Action Records (under licence from Big Bear Records)
- Detroit Blackbottom (1975), Big Bear Records
- Lonesome Feeling (1986), Black & Blue Records BB-455.2 (recorded in the Netherlands)
- Detroit (1990), Blue Suit Records
- Snake Eyes (2002), Delmark Records (with Jimmy Burns)
- Second Degree Burns (2005), Blue Suit Records

=== Compilations ===
- Blues For Big Town (1985), Chess/P-Vine Records
- Treat Me Like I Treat You (1986), Moonshine Records
- Detroit Blues 1950–1951 (1987), Krazy Kat Records
- I Love To Jump The Boogie (2021), Jasmine Records JASMCD-3186

=== Singles ===
- "Notoriety Woman" (1948), Palda Records
- "Hello Miss Jessie Lee" (1953), DeLuxe Records
- "Biscuit Baking Mama" (1954), Checker Records
- "Treat Me Like I Treat You" (1957), Chess Records
- "Orange Driver" (1961), Harvey Records
- "The Thing to Do" (1961), Harvey Records
- "(Don't Be) Messing with My Bread" (1962), Harvey Records (with Little Sonny)
- "Wig Wearin' Woman" (1965), Von Records
- "I Am Leaving" (1965), Von Records
- "Don't Even Try It" (1982), Red Bird Records

=== Appearances ===
With John Lee Hooker

- The Real Folk Blues (Chess Records, 1966)
- More Real Folk Blues: The Missing Album (Chess Records, 1966 [rel. 1991])

== Quotation ==
Many music lovers don't know that nearly a whole generation of original and highly talented musicians in Detroit were either snuffed out or forced to flee Detroit to keep their music careers alive. You'd come into the studio, cut a record, and they'd pay you maybe $20 and a bottle of whiskey. It didn't matter if the record sold ten copies or if they sold ten thousand.

— Fifth Estate, September 1973

== See also ==
- List of Detroit blues musicians
- List of harmonica blues musicians
