= Warnings Moving Clockwise =

- 7" single cover

Single by Do-Ré-Mi

from the album Domestic Harmony
- A-side: "Warnings Moving Clockwise"
- B-side: "Disneyland", "Standing on Wires"
- Released: November 1985
- Recorded: January/February 1985
- Venue: London
- Genre: New wave, rock
- Length: 3:40
- Label: Virgin Records
- Songwriters: Deborah Conway, Dorland Bray, Helen Carter, Stephen Philip
- Producer: Gavin MacKillop

Do-Ré-Mi singles chronology
"Idiot Grin" (1985)	"Warnings Moving Clockwise" (1985)	"Guns and Butter" (1986)

"Warnings Moving Clockwise" is a song by Australian rock/pop group Do-Re-Mi released by Virgin Records in November 1985 as the third and final single from their debut studio album. The song peaked at number 72 in Australia.

== Track listing ==
All tracks were written by Deborah Conway, Dorland Bray, Helen Carter and Stephen Philip.

1. "Warnings Moving Clockwise" - 3:40
2. "Disneyland" (live) - 2:45
3. "Standing on Wires" (live) - 3:03

== Charts ==
Chart (1985/86)	Peak position
Australia (Kent Music Report)	72

== Personnel ==
Do-Ré-Mi members

- Dorland Bray — drums, percussion, backing vocals
- Helen Carter — bass guitar, backing vocals
- Deborah Conway — lead vocalist
- Stephen Philip — guitar

Additional musicians

- Roger Freeman — trombone
- Steve Hogarth — keyboards

Recording details

- Producer, engineer — Gavin MacKillop
  - Assistant engineer — Chris Potter, Mike Bigwood, Steve Chase
- Studio — Townhouse III Studios London
  - Mixing studio — Maison Rouge Studios London, Genetic Studios Reading
