= Lonnie Pitchford =

American blues singer (1955–1998)

Lonnie Pitchford (October 8, 1955 – November 8, 1998) was an American blues musician and instrument maker from Lexington, Mississippi, United States. He was one of only a handful of young African American musicians from Mississippi who had learned and was continuing the Delta blues and country blues traditions of the older generations.

In addition to the acoustic and electric guitar, Pitchford was skilled at the one-string guitar and diddley bow, a one-string instrument of African origin, as well as the double bass, piano and harmonica. He was a protégé of Robert Lockwood Jr., from whom he learned the style of Robert Johnson. For a while, Pitchford performed accompanied by Johnny Shines and Lockwood. His own debut album, All Round Man was released on Rooster Blues Records in 1994. Pitchford performed at the Smithsonian Festival of American Folklife, and at the 1984 Downhome Blues Festival in Atlanta, Georgia.

In November 1998, Pitchford died at his home in Lexington, from AIDS. He was survived by a wife, Minnie Pitchford, along with a daughter from a previous relationship. A diddley bow is featured on his headstone which was paid for by John Fogerty and Rooster Blues Records through the Mount Zion Memorial Fund. His grave is located near the grave of Elmore James, in the New Port Baptist Church cemetery in Holmes County, Mississippi.

== Film ==
- American Patchwork: Songs and Stories of America, part 3: "The Land Where the Blues Began" (1990). Written, directed, and produced by Alan Lomax; developed by the Association for Cultural Equity at Columbia University and Hunter College. North Carolina Public TV; A Dibb Direction production for Channel 4.
- Deep Blues: A Musical Pilgrimage to the Crossroads (1993). Directed by Robert Mugge.

== See also ==
- List of blues musicians
