= Albinia (disambiguation) =

Albinia is a town in Tuscany, central Italy.

Albinia may also refer to:

- Albinia (1813 ship), a merchant ship of British East India Company
- Albinia gens, the Roman gens
- Alice Albinia, English journalist and author
- Albinia, Queensland, a locality in Australia
- Albinia (name), a female given name

== See also ==
- Albina (disambiguation)
- Albania (disambiguation)
