= List of shipwrecks in September 1838 =

The list of shipwrecks in September 1838 includes ships sunk, foundered, wrecked, grounded, or otherwise lost during September 1838.

== 1 September ==
List of shipwrecks: 1 September 1838
Ship	State	Description
Gezina	Stettin	The ship ran aground on the Kentish Knock. She was on a voyage from Stettin to Rouen, Seine-Inférieure, France. Gezina was refloated and taken into Ramsgate, Kent, United Kingdom.
Hendrika Elizabeth	Netherlands	The brig was captured by pirates and scuttled in the Adriatic Sea off Scio, Greece. Her crew survived.
Lunar	United Kingdom	The ship departed from Havana, Cuba for Cowes, Isle of Wight. No further trace, presumed foundered with the loss of all hands.

== 2 September ==
List of shipwrecks: 2 September 1838
Ship	State	Description
Abgarris	United Kingdom	The ship was destroyed by fire in the Indian Ocean. Fourteen crew survived. The rest of her crew and 50 passengers were killed. She was on a voyage from Muscat to Java, Spanish East Indies.
Louise	Sweden	The ship was wrecked on the Goodwin Sands, Kent, United Kingdom. Her crew were rescued. She was on a voyage from Lisbon, Portugal to Kalmar.

== 3 September ==
List of shipwrecks: 3 September 1838
Ship	State	Description
Rurick	Denmark	The ship ran aground on the Bortharger. Her crew were rescued. She was on a voyage from London, United Kingdom to Bjorneborg. Also reported as 30 September.

== 4 September ==
List of shipwrecks: 4 September 1838
Ship	State	Description
Constitution	United Kingdom	The ship ran aground in the Solway Firth. She was on a voyage from Carlisle, Cumberland to Saint John's, Newfoundland, British North America. She was refloated the next day and resumed her voyage.
Hiram	United Kingdom	The ship ran aground in the River Usk.

== 5 September ==
List of shipwrecks: 5 September 1838
Ship	State	Description
Æolides	Denmark	The ship ran aground off Dragør. She was on a voyage from Puri, Grand Duchy of Finland to London. Æolides was refloated on 9 September.
Littlehampton	United Kingdom	The ship was in collision with Diana (United Kingdom) and sank in The Gulls. Her crew were rescued. She was on a voyage from Sunderland, County Durham to Worthing, Sussex.
Pheasant	United Kingdom	The ship ran aground in the River Usk.

== 6 September ==
List of shipwrecks: 6 September 1838
Ship	State	Description
Delphin	Sweden	The ship sprang a leak and was abandoned in the North Sea off Spurn Point, Yorkshire, United Kingdom. Her crew were rescued by the smack Favourite (United Kingdom). Delphin was later taken in tow and beached near Grimsby, Lincolnshire.
Gustav	Prussia	The ship was wrecked on the Goodwin Sands, Kent, United Kingdom. Her crew were rescued. She was on a voyage from Gloucester, United Kingdom to Kiel.
Ida	United Kingdom	The ship capsized at Sunderland, County Durham. She was later righted.
Jane	United Kingdom	The brig was abandoned in the North Sea 55 nautical miles (102 km) north of the Pentland Firth. Her crew were rescued by Packet (United Kingdom). Jane was on a voyage from Stettin to Liverpool, Lancashire.
Jane	United Kingdom	The ship ran aground on the Four Brothers Reef. Her crew were rescued. She was on a voyage from "Lambock" to Canton, China. Jane subsequently became a wreck.
Jeans	United Kingdom	The sloop caught fire when her cargo of unslaked lime got wet. She was abandoned off Aberdeen. Jeans was on a voyage from Sunderland to Inverness.
Sophia Maria	Duchy of Holstein	The ship ran aground and capsized off Tönning. She was on a voyage from Tönning to Hull, Yorkshire. Sophia Maria was later righted and taken into Tönning.

== 7 September ==
List of shipwrecks: 7 September 1838
Ship	State	Description
Adventurer	United Kingdom	The brig was driven ashore and wrecked near the mouth of the River Spey. Her crew survived. She was on a voyage from Miramichi, New Brunswick, British North America to Sunderland, County Durham.
Courrier de Tampico	France	The ship was wrecked near the Cape Florida Lighthouse, Florida Territory with the loss of nine of the sixteen people on board. She was on a voyage from Havana, Cuba to Bordeaux, Gironde.
Diana	United Kingdom	The ship was driven ashore in the Farne Islands, Northumberland. Her crew were rescued. She was on a voyage from "Wairn" to Berwick upon Tweed, Northumberland.
Forfarshire	United Kingdom	Forfarshire The brigantine-rigged paddle steamer ran aground on Big Harcar, Farne Islands with the loss of 42 of the 60 people on board. Nine of the survivors escaped in a lifeboat, the remainder were rescued by Grace and William Darling, who used a coble. Forfarshire was on a voyage from Hull, Yorkshire to Dundee, Forfarshire.
Georgiana	United Kingdom	The ship capsized at Cork and was severely damaged.
Providence	United Kingdom	The ship was wrecked near Fishguard, Pembrokeshire.

== 8 September ==
List of shipwrecks: 8 September 1838
Ship	State	Description
Caledonia	United States	The schooner was wrecked on the Colorados, off the coast of Cuba. She was on a voyage from Havana, Cuba to New Orleans, Louisiana.
William	(United Kingdom of Great Britain and Ireland) New South Wales	The brig was wrecked on the Cockburn Reef in the Torres Straits off Hardy's Island. Her crew were rescued by Trusty (United Kingdom). William was on a voyage from Sydney, New South Wales to Timor, Netherlands East Indies.

== 10 September ==
List of shipwrecks: 10 September 1838
Ship	State	Description
Elizabeth	United Kingdom	The ship was driven ashore and severely damaged at Flamborough Head, Yorkshire. She was on a voyage from Boston, Lincolnshire to Newcastle upon Tyne, Northumberland.
Molly Moore	United Kingdom	The brig was wrecked near Cape Ray, Newfoundland, British North America. Her crew were rescued by Arethusa (United Kingdom). She was on a voyage from Wexford to Quebec City, Lower Canada, British North America.

== 11 September ==
List of shipwrecks: 11 September 1838
Ship	State	Description
Everthorpe	United Kingdom	The ship ran aground in the New Channel. She was on a voyage from Liverpool, Lancashire to Saint Petersburg, Russia.
Falcon	United Kingdom	The steamship ran aground in the River Thames at Northfleet, Kent. Her passengers were transferred to the steamship Vesper (United Kingdom). Falcon was on a voyage from Gravesend, Kent to Waterloo Bridge, London. She was later refloated.
Three Sodskende	Norway	The ship was driven ashore crewless and was wrecked on Sylt, duchy of Schleswig. She was on a voyage from Mandal to a Scottish port.

== 12 September ==
List of shipwrecks: 12 September 1838
Ship	State	Description
Harold	United States	The ship ran aground in the Mississippi River downstream of New Orleans, Louisiana. She was on a voyage from Boston, Massachusetts to New Orleans.
Louisa	United Kingdom	The ship was driven ashore near New York, United States. She was on a voyage from Liverpool, Lancashire to New York. Louisa was refloated on 15 September.
Macedonia	United Kingdom	The ship was wrecked at Portland, Maine, United States. Her crew were rescued. She was on a voyage from Liverpool, Lancashire to Portland.
Margaret	United Kingdom	The ship was in collision with William and Jane off Flamborough Head, Yorkshire and foundered.

== 13 September ==
List of shipwrecks: 13 September 1838
Ship	State	Description
Prince Regent	(United Kingdom of Great Britain and Ireland) Jersey	The ship was wrecked near Gaspé, Lower Canada, British North America. Her crew were rescued.

== 14 September ==
List of shipwrecks: 14 September 1838
Ship	State	Description
Dauphin	United Kingdom	The ship was driven ashore at Falkenberg, Sweden. She was on a voyage from Stockholm, Sweden to Saint-Brieuc, Côtes-du-Nord.
Rankin	United Kingdom	The ship was wrecked on the Dead Island Reef, off the coast of Newfoundland, British North America. Her crew were rescued.

== 15 September ==
List of shipwrecks: 15 September 1838
Ship	State	Description
Bustler	United Kingdom	The ship departed from Labrador, British North America for Plymouth, Devon. No further trace, presumed foundered with the loss of all hands.
Eliza	United Kingdom	The ship was driven ashore and damaged at Viana do Castelo, Portugal. She was later refloated.
Hyder Ally	United States	The schooner was wrecked off the Marquesas Keys, Florida Territory. She was on a voyage from Havana, Cuba to New Orleans, Louisiana.
Mediterranean Packet	United Kingdom	The ship departed from Rio de Janeiro, Brazil for London. No further trace, presumed foundered with the loss of all hands.

== 16 September ==
List of shipwrecks: 16 September 1838
Ship	State	Description
Napoleon	United States	The ship was driven ashore at Lewes, Prince Edward Island, British North America. Her crew were rescued. She was on a voyage from Saint John, New Brunswick, British North America to Philadelphia, Pennsylvania. Napoleon was refloated on 29 September and taken into Philadelphia.

== 17 September ==
List of shipwrecks: 17 September 1838
Ship	State	Description
Alabama	United States	The sloop was driven ashore and wrecked 12 nautical miles (22 km) north of the Cape Florida Lighthouse, Florida Territory with the loss of four of her five crew.
Alderley	United States	The brig was driven ashore and wrecked 12 nautical miles (22 km) north of the Cape Florida Lighthouse. All but one of her crew were murdered by the local inhabitants.
Betsey	United Kingdom	The ship departed from Labrador for Jersey, Channel Islands. No further trace, presumed foundered in the Atlantic Ocean with the loss of all hands.
Caledonia	United States	The ship was wrecked on the Colorados, off the coast of Cuba with the loss of all hands.
Caroline	United States	The schooner struck the Ledberry Reef, off the mouth of Cæsar's Creek, Florida Territory and sank with the loss of all eight crew.
Caution	United States	The sloop was driven ashore and wrecked 12 nautical miles (22 km) north of the Cape Florida Lighthouse with the loss of all seven crew.
Courrier de Vera Cruz	France	The brig was driven ashore and wrecked 12 nautical miles (22 km) north of the Cape Florida Lighthouse with the loss of nine of the sixteen people on board. She was on a voyage from Havana, Cuba to Bordeaux, Gironde.
Dread	United States	The sloop was driven ashore and wrecked 12 nautical miles (22 km) north of the Cape Florida Lighthouse with the loss of all six crew.
Ella Hand	United States	The ship was wrecked on the Stirrup Keys. Her crew were rescued.
Export	United States	The brig was wrecked on the Ledberry Reef. Her crew survived. She was on a voyage from Matanzas, Cuba to Boston, Massachusetts.
Four Brothers	United States	The schooner was wrecked on the Florida Reefs with the loss of all hands.
Kentucky	United States	The ship foundered in the Gulf of Mexico with the loss of all hands.
Maria	United Kingdom	The ship was run down and sunk by London (United Kingdom). Her crew were rescued by London. Maria was on a voyage from Newport, Monmouthshire to Liverpool, Lancashire.
Mother & Sisters	United Kingdom	The ship was abandoned in the Irish Sea. Her crew were rescued by the steamship Town (United Kingdom). Mother & Sisters was on a voyage from Liverpool to Newry, County Antrim.
Palestine	United States	The schooner was abandoned off the Florida Territory. She was on a voyage from Matanzas to Boston, Massachusetts.
Santa Luis el Pinto	Spain	The ship was driven ashore and wrecked on Vlieland, Friesland, Netherlands. Her crew were rescued. She was on a voyage from Riga, Russia to Vigo.
Triumph	United States	The full-rigged ship was wrecked on the Ledberry Reef with the loss of all hands.
Thracian	United States	The full-rigged ship was wrecked on the Ledberry Reef. Her crew survived.

== 18 September ==
List of shipwrecks: 18 September 1838
Ship	State	Description
Irkutsk (Иркутск)	Imperial Russian Navy	The transport ship was driven ashore and wrecked in Lake Baikal at Posolskoye. Her crew were rescued.
Jessie	United Kingdom	The ship was wrecked in Morant Bay, Jamaica. She was on a voyage from Jamaica to Cork.
Reinha dos Angos	Portugal	The ship was abandoned in the Atlantic Ocean. She was on a voyage from Porto to New York, United States.
Wye	United Kingdom	The ship ran aground on the Kentish Knock, in the North Sea. She was refloated but consequently sank. Her crew were rescued. She was on a voyage from Margate, Kent to Great Yarmouth, Norfolk.

== 19 September ==
List of shipwrecks: 19 September 1838
Ship	State	Description
Louisa	United Kingdom	The ship was driven ashore in Delaware Bay. She was later refloated.
Niobe	United States	The ship was abandoned in the Atlantic Ocean off Cape Hatteras, North Carolina. She was on a voyage from Baltimore, Maryland to Rio de Janeiro, Brazil.
Yazoo	United States	The ship ran aground in the Mississippi River. She was on a voyage from New York to New Orleans, Louisiana. Yazoo was later refloated.
Zetland	United Kingdom	The ship ran aground on the Puercas Rocks, off the coast of Spain. She was on a voyage from Savanilla, near Puerto Colombia, to Cádiz, Spain. Zetland was refloated with assistance from Cassard (French Navy) and HMS Trinculo (Royal Navy) and take into Cádiz.

== 20 September ==
List of shipwrecks: 20 September 1838
Ship	State	Description
Emelie	Denmark	The ship was in collision with William (United Kingdom) and sank in the North Sea off Flamborough Head, Yorkshire, United Kingdom. Her crew were rescued. She was on a voyage from Copenhagen to King's Lynn, Norfolk, United Kingdom.
Widdrington	United Kingdom	The ship ran aground off the coast of Denmark. She was on a voyage from Saint Petersburg, Russia to Leith, Lothian. Widdrington was refloated on 25 September and put into Christiansø, Denmark.

== 22 September ==
List of shipwrecks: 22 September 1838
Ship	State	Description
Grainger	United Kingdom	The ship ran aground on the Herd Sand, in the North Sea off the coast of County Durham. She was on a voyage from London to South Shields, County Durham.
Susannah	United Kingdom	The ship was run down and sunk in the North Sea off the mouth of the Humber by Tisco (United Kingdom). Her crew were rescued.

== 23 September ==
List of shipwrecks: 23 September 1838
Ship	State	Description
Cerus	United Kingdom	The ship was driven ashore on Souter Point, County Durham. She was refloated the next day and taken into Sunderland, County Durham.
Cincinatti	United States	The ship ran aground in the Mississippi River downstream of New Orleans, Louisiana.
Congress	United States	The ship was wrecked on Point Lepreaux, New Brunswick, British North America. Her crew were rescued. She was on a voyage from Eastport, Maine to Nova Scotia, British North America.
Eliza Jane	United States	The ship ran aground in the Mississippi River downstream of New Orleans.
Favourite	United Kingdom	The ship was driven ashore and wrecked on Dead Island, British North America. She was on a voyage from Belfast, County Antrim to Miramichi, New Brunswick, British North America.
St. Cloud	United States	The ship ran aground in the Mississippi River downstream of New Orleans.

== 24 September ==
List of shipwrecks: 24 September 1838
Ship	State	Description
Albinia	United Kingdom	The ship ran aground on the Kent Sand, in the Bay of Fundy. She was on a voyage from Demerara, British Honduras to St. Andrews, New Brunswick, British North America. Albinia was later refloated.
Claremont	United Kingdom	The ship was wrecked. Her crew were rescued.
Tropic	United States	The ship was abandoned in the Atlantic Ocean. Her crew were rescued. She was on a voyage from Gothenburg, Sweden to Fall River, Massachusetts.

== 25 September ==
List of shipwrecks: 25 September 1838
Ship	State	Description
Emma	United Kingdom	The ship was wrecked on the Gar Sand, in the North Sea off the coast of County Durham. Her crew were rescued. SHe was on a voyage from Hartlepool, County Durham to London.
Montrose	United Kingdom	The ship was wrecked on the Hogsty Reef. Her crew were rescued. She was on a voyage from St. Jago de Cuba to Swansea, Glamorgan.

== 27 September ==
List of shipwrecks: 27 September 1838
Ship	State	Description
Gesina	Hamburg	The ship foundered between Borkum, Kingdom of Hanover and Heligoland. Her crew were rescued. She was on a voyage from Fraserburgh or Macduff, Aberdeenshire, United Kingdom to Hamburg.

== 28 September ==
List of shipwrecks: 28 September 1838
Ship	State	Description
Helen McGregor	United Kingdom	The ship departed from Trinidad for Greenock, Renfrewshire. No further trace, presumed foundered with the loss of all hands.
Union	United Kingdom	The ship was wrecked on Cape George, Nova Scotia, British North America. Her crew were rescued. She was on a voyage from Halifax to Pictou.
Usk	United Kingdom	The ship was abandoned in the Atlantic Ocean. All on board were rescued by Henry Knoeland (United States). Usk was on a voyage from Torquay, Devon to Miramichi, New Brunswick, British North America.

== 29 September ==
List of shipwrecks: 29 September 1838
Ship	State	Description
Astrea	United Kingdom	The ship ran aground off Smyrna, Ottoman Empire. She was on a voyage from Smyrna to Cork. Astrea was later refloated and resumed her voyage.
Frau Maria	Netherlands	The ship was driven ashore on Saaremaa, Russia. Her crew were rescued. She was on a voyage from Amsterdam, North Holland to Riga, Russia.
Mercurius	Lübeck	The ship was driven ashore on Saaremaa. Her crew were rescued. She was on a voyage from Lübeck to Stockholm, Sweden.
Regent	United Kingdom	The ship was driven ashore at Falkenberg, Sweden. She was on a voyage from "Wyburg" to Newcastle upon Tyne, Northumberland.
Swiftsure	United Kingdom	The ship ran aground off Smyrna. She was on a voyage from Smyrna to London. Swiftsure was later refloated and resumed her voyage.
William Waters	United Kingdom	The ship was sighted off Charleston, South Carolina whilst on a voyage from Havana, Cuba to Cowes, Isle of Wight. No further trace, presumed foundered with the loss of all hands.

== 30 September ==
List of shipwrecks: 30 September 1838
Ship	State	Description
Fortuna	Denmark	The ship ran aground in the Middle Grounds. She was on a voyage from Pori, Grand Duchy of Finland to London, United Kingdom. Fortuna was later refloated and resumed her voyage.
Neptunus	Sweden	The ship ran aground on the Rysse. She was on a voyage from Stockholm to Dieppe, Seine-Inférieure, France. Neptunus was later refloated and resumed her voyage.
Nestor	United Kingdom	The ship sprang a leak and was abandoned in the Atlantic Ocean. She was on a voyage from Demerara, British Honduras to Charleston, South Carolina, United States.

== Unknown date ==
List of shipwrecks: Unknown date in September 1838
Ship	State	Description
Abeona	(United Kingdom of Great Britain and Ireland) British North America	The ship sank at Domino, Labrador between 7 and 9 September.
Airthy Castle	United Kingdom	The ship was wrecked on Anticosti Island, Lower Canada, British North America. She was on a voyage from Bristol, Gloucestershire to Quebec City, Lower Canada.
Ann	United Kingdom	The ship capsized at South Shields, County Durham and was severely damaged. She was refloated on 10 September.
Augusta	United States	The ship was driven ashore and wrecked on Bart Island British North America in late September.
Avalon	(United Kingdom of Great Britain and Ireland) British North America	The ship was wrecked on the coast of Rovers Island, Labrador between 7 and 9 September.
Bellona	Prussia	The ship foundered off "Anhall". Her crew were rescued.
Fairy Queen	United Kingdom	The ship was wrecked at Indian Tickle, Labrador between 7 and 9 September.
Feronia	United Kingdom	The sloop was wrecked in Swansea Bay. Her three crew were rescued.
Fredericke og Maria	Denmark	The ship was sunk by ice whilst on a voyage from Troense to Greenland. Her crew were rescued.
Iris	United Kingdom	The ship was driven ashore at Drogheda, County Louth. Her crew were rescued. She was on a voyage from Harrington, Cumberland to Balbriggan, County Dublin.
James Dee	(United Kingdom of Great Britain and Ireland) British North America	The ship was abandoned in the Atlantic Ocean before 17 October.
John and William	(United Kingdom of Great Britain and Ireland) British North America	The ship was wrecked at Indian Tickle between 7 and 9 September.
Kingston	United Kingdom	The ship was driven ashore on the Isle of Man. She was on a voyage from Liverpool, Lancashire to Quebec City. Kingston was later refloated and put back to Liverpool.
Lady of the Lake	(United Kingdom of Great Britain and Ireland) British North America	The ship was driven ashore and damaged at Domino between 7 and 9 September.
Maria	Duchy of Holstein	The ship ran aground in the Eider. She was on a voyage from Tönning to Hull, Yorkshire, United Kingdom. Maria was later refloated and put back to Tönning.
Mary Ann	United Kingdom	The ship was wrecked at Indian Tickle between7 and 9 September.
Norske Eiendom	Norway	The schooner was wrecked on Sylt, Duchy of Schleswig.
Oliver	United Kingdom	The ship was run down and sunk by North Star (United Kingdom). Her crew were rescued. She was on a voyage from Gaspé, Lower Canada to Naples, Kingdom of the Two Sicilies.
Page	United Kingdom	The ship was driven ashore on Saltholm, Denmark before 8 September. She was on a voyage from Danzig to Liverpool. Page was refloated on 11 September and put into Helsingør, Denmark.
Patriot	United Kingdom	The ship sank at Whiteness, Shetland Islands. Her crew survived. She was on a voyage from Dunbeath, Caithness to Waterford.
USS Pennsylvania	United States Navy	The ship of the line was driven ashore at Norfolk, Virginia before 18 September. She was later refloated.
Potomac	United States	The brig was abandoned in the Atlantic Ocean before 25 September with the loss of a crew member. Survivors were rescued by Vandalia (United Kingdom).
Prince of Waterloo	United Kingdom	The ship was wrecked at Margate, Kent. She was on a voyage from Ostend, West Flanders, Belgium to London.
Rainbow	(United Kingdom of Great Britain and Ireland) British North America	The ship was driven out to sea crewless from Labrador between 7 and 9 September. No further trace, presumed foundered.
Royal Recovery	United Kingdom	The brig was run down and sunk in the Irish Sea off Bardsey Island, Pembrokeshire before 16 September.
Southampton	United Kingdom	The ship was driven ashore on Hare Island, Lower Canada, British North America before 27 September.
Success	(United Kingdom of Great Britain and Ireland) British North America	The ship was wrecked at Indian Tickle between 7 and 9 September.
