= Errata (disambiguation) =

Errata is the plural form of the word "erratum".

Errata may also refer to:

- Errata, Mississippi, an unincorporated area in Jones County, Mississippi
- Errata, a feminine character from the comic book Asterix in Corsica
