= Leonard Ware =

American jazz guitarist

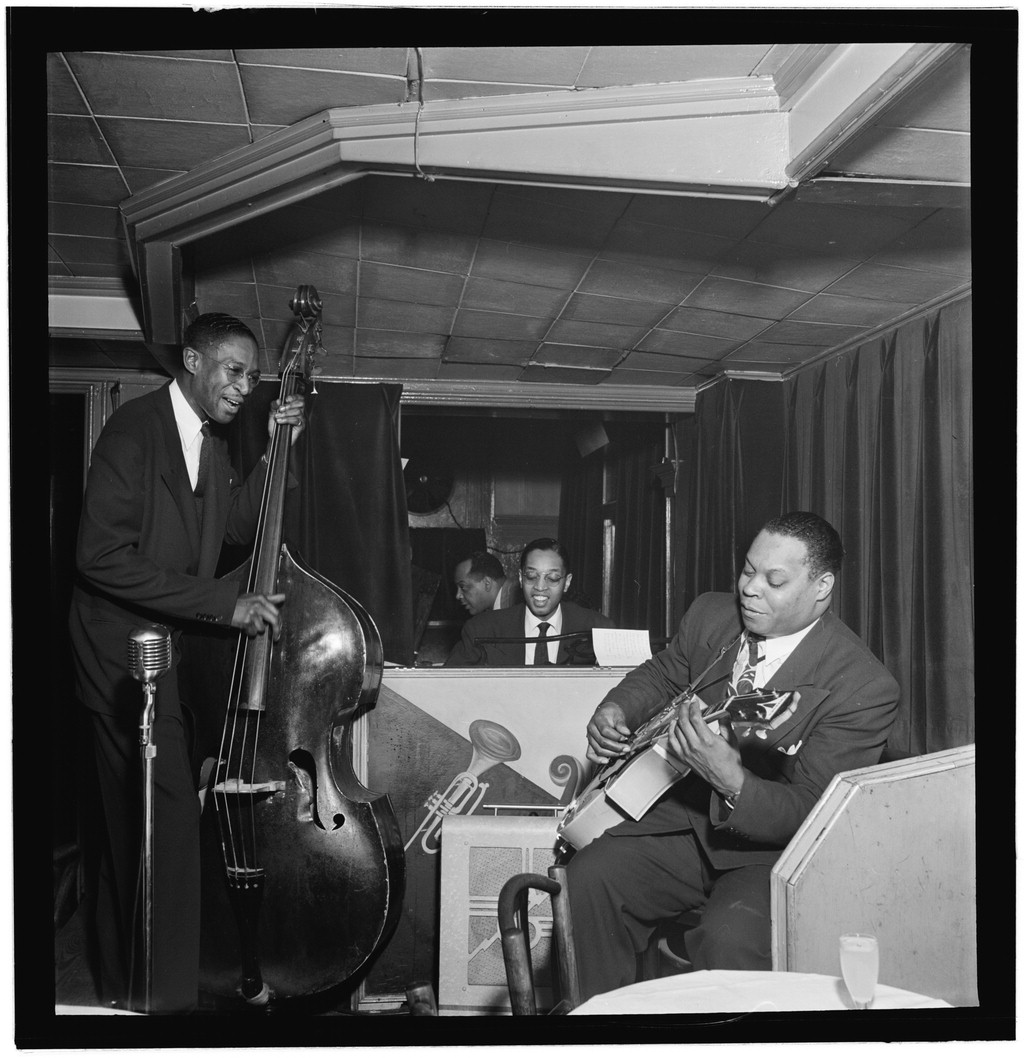
- Leonard Ware (right) with Billy Taylor and Zutty Singleton in New York City, mid-1940s Photograph by William P. Gottlieb

Background information
- Born: December 28, 1909 Richmond, Virginia, U.S.
- Died: March 30, 1974 (aged 64)
- Genres: Jazz, blues
- Occupation: Musician
- Instrument: Guitar
- Years active: 1930s–1940s

Leonard Ware (December 28, 1909 – March 30, 1974) was one of the first American jazz guitarists to play electric guitar.

== Career ==
Ware was born in Richmond, Virginia. He went to college at the Tuskegee Institute and learned how to play the oboe.

In 1938, Ware played electric guitar on recordings by Sidney Bechet. The duo he then started with Jimmy Shirley was one of the first groups to have two electric guitarists. Ware performed in a trio during the 1940s and recorded as a leader in 1947. He also recorded with Don Byas, Albennie Jones, Buddy Johnson, and Big Joe Turner.

In December 1938, he played at Carnegie Hall with the Kansas City Six (Lester Young and Buck Clayton); in 1939 he recorded with Benny Goodman ("Umbrella Man").

Ware was the co-composer of "Hold Tight" (which he recorded with Bechet) and "I Dreamt I Dwelt in Harlem" (with Jerry Gray and Buddy Feyne), which was recorded by Glenn Miller and The Delta Rhythm Boys in 1941. A few years later, he dropped out of music. He died in 1974.

== Discography ==
- 1937–1938, Sidney Bechet (Classics)

== Sources ==
- Bielefelder Katalog 1988
- Richard Cook & Brian Morton: The Penguin Guide to Jazz on CD 6th edition. ISBN 0-14-051521-6
- Leonard Feather, Ira Gitler: The Biographical Encyclopedia of Jazz. Oxford University Press, Oxford usw. 1999; ISBN 978-0-19-532000-8
- John Jörgensen, Erik Wiedemann Jazzlexikon. Mosaik, München, 1967
