= List of shipwrecks in March 1842 =

The list of shipwrecks in March 1842 includes ships sunk, foundered, wrecked, grounded, or otherwise lost during March 1842.

== 1 March ==
List of shipwrecks: March 1842
Ship	State	Description
Diligence	United Kingdom	The schooner was in collision with the brig Undaunted (United Kingdom) and sank in the English Channel 5 nautical miles (9.3 km) off Bolt Head, Devon with the loss of two of her five crew. Survivors were rescued by Undaunted.
Little Martha	United Kingdom	The ship struck the Nieges Bank, in the English Channel off the coast of Seine-Inférieure, France and sank. Her crew were rescued. She was on a voyage from Rouen, Seine-Inférieure to Liverpool, Lancashire.
Vibilia	United Kingdom	The ship struck rocks off Jersey, Channel Islands and was damaged. She was on a voyage from Saint Andrews, New Brunswick, British North America to Jersey. Vibilia was refloated and taken into Jersey in a waterlogged condition.

== 2 March ==
List of shipwrecks: 2 March 1842
Ship	State	Description
Cowslip	United Kingdom	The ship was driven ashore on Tenedos, Ottoman Empire.
Despatch	United Kingdom	The ship ran aground on the Kentish Knock and was abandoned by her crew. She was on a voyage from Middlesbrough, Yorkshire to Torquay, Devon.
Economy	United Kingdom	The ship sank in the Queens Channel, off the north coast of Kent. Her crew were rescued. She was on a voyage from Rouen, Seine-Inférieure, France to London.
George	United Kingdom	The schooner sprang a leak and was beached at Stallingborough, Lincolnshire. She was on a voyage from Sunderland, County Durham to Hull, Yorkshire.
Montague	United Kingdom	The ship was wrecked on Helen's Shoal, in the "Jillolo Passage". Her crew took to the boats and were rescued a month later by Montgomery (United States). Montague was on a voyage from Bombay, India to Macao.
Ninette	France	The ship was driven onto the Goodwin Sands, Kent, United Kingdom. She was on a voyage from London, United Kingdom to Havre de Grâce, Seine-Inférieure.
Princess	United Kingdom	The ship was driven ashore at Troy, Ottoman Empire.
Quebec Packet	United Kingdom	The ship was abandoned in the Atlantic Ocean. Her crew were rescued by Creighton (United Kingdom). Quebec Packet was on a voyage from Halifax, Nova Scotia, British North America to Cork.
Sharp	United Kingdom	The ship was wrecked on the Whiting Sand, in the North Sea off the coast of Essex. Her crew were rescued. She was on a voyage from Hartlepool, County Durham to London.
Storms	United Kingdom	The brig ran aground on the Nore. She was refloated and was consequently beached at Chapman Head, Essex where she was severely damaged by fire. She was subsequently towed into London.
Undaunted	United Kingdom	The ship was driven ashore in the Humber at Paull, Yorkshire. She was on a voyage from Hull to Hamburg. Undaunted was refloated the next day and resumed her voyage.
Unity	United Kingdom	The ship collided with the brig Sarah (United Kingdom) and foundered off Kingsgate, Kent. Her crew were rescued.
Victoria	United Kingdom	The ship was driven ashore and wrecked on Flores Island, Azores.

== 3 March ==
List of shipwrecks: 3 March 1842
Ship	State	Description
Balclutha	United Kingdom	The ship was driven ashore and wrecked at Vesteres Point, Barbados. Her crew were rescued. She was on a voyage from the Clyde to Barbados.
City of Edinburgh	United Kingdom	The steamship was driven ashore and wrecked at Ostend, West Flanders, Belgium. She was on a voyage from London to Ostend.
Economy	United Kingdom	The ship was in collision with the barque Jenny ( Kingdom of Lombardy–Venetia) and sank in the Queens Channel, off the north coast of Kent. She was on a voyage from Rouen, Seine-Inférieure, France to London.
Harper	United Kingdom	The ship departed from Newcastle upon Tyne, Northumberland for Belfast, County Antrim. No further trace, presumed foundered with the loss of all hands.
Sepoy	United Kingdom	The ship was wrecked near Digby, Nova Scotia, British North America. Her crew were rescued. She was on a voyage from Saint John, New Brunswick, British North America to Liverpool, Lancashire.

== 4 March ==
List of shipwrecks: 4 March 1842
Ship	State	Description
Asia	United Kingdom	The ship was driven ashore at Mobile, Alabama. She was on a voyage from Liverpool, Lancashire to Mobile. Asia was refloated on 23 March.
Eliza Payson	(United Kingdom of Great Britain and Ireland) British North America	The ship was wrecked on Seal Island, Nova Scotia. Her crew were rescued. She was on a voyage from the West Indies to Westport, Nova Scotia.
Jeune Eliza	France	The ship was wrecked on Great Heneagua, Bahamas. She was on a voyage from the Rio de la Hacha to Helsingør, Denmark.
Penelope	United Kingdom	The ship was in collision with Astley (United Kingdom) and sank in the North Sea off the Shipwash Lightship ( Trinity House) with the loss of a crew member. She was on a voyage from Newcastle upon Tyne, Northumberland to London.

== 5 March ==
List of shipwrecks: 5 March 1842
Ship	State	Description
Apollo	United Kingdom	The ship ran aground on the Goodwin Sands, Kent. She was on a voyage from Marseille, Bouches-du-Rhône, France to Hull, Yorkshire. She was refloated and taken into Ramsgate, Kent.
Unity	United States	The ship ran aground on the Great Ledge. She was on a voyage from New York City to Halifax, Nova Scotia, British North America. United was refloated and taken into Westport, New York.

== 7 March ==
List of shipwrecks: 7 March 1842
Ship	State	Description
Jane Clark	United Kingdom	The ship was in collision with HMS Athol (Royal Navy) and foundered in the English Channel 21 nautical miles (39 km) south by west of The Lizard, Cornwall. Her crew were rescued by HMS Athol. Jane Clark was on a voyage from South Shields, County Durham to Naples, Kingdom of the Two Sicilies.
Margaret	United Kingdom	The ship was driven ashore in Broad Bay. She was on a voyage from Laxford, Sutherland to Liverpool, Lancashire. Margaret was refloated on 14 March and taken into Stornoway, Isle of Lewis, Outer Hebrides for repairs.
Uncertain	United Kingdom	The ship struck a sunken rock and foundered in Broad Bay. She was on a voyage from Sunderland, County Durham to Londonderry.

== 8 March ==
List of shipwrecks: 8 March 1842
Ship	State	Description
Marquis of Normanby	United Kingdom	The sloop was wrecked on the South Reef, off the coast of Grenada.
Wilton	United Kingdom	The ship was driven ashore at Buenos Aires, Argentina.

== 9 March ==
List of shipwrecks: March 1842
Ship	State	Description
Cæsar	Belgium	The ship was driven ashore at Sandown Castle, Kent. She was on a voyage from Ostend, West Flanders to Newport, Monmouthshire, United Kingdom. She was refloated on 12 March and taken into Ramsgate, Kent.
Countess	United Kingdom	The ship was driven ashore in Red Wharf Bay, Anglesey. She was on a voyage from Liverpool, Lancashire to Harlingen, Friesland, Netherlands. She was later refloated and taken into Amlwch, Anglesey.
Economy	United Kingdom	The brig foundered in the English Channel off Littlehampton, Sussex with the loss of all ten people on board. She was on a voyage from Sunderland, County Durham to Littlehampton.
Esperance	France	The ship was driven ashore west of Boulogne, Pas-de-Calais. Her crew were rescued. She was on a voyage from Dunkirk, Nord to Bordeaux, Gironde.
Gem or Gun	United Kingdom	The ship was driven ashore and wrecked near Ryde, Isle of Wight.
George	United Kingdom	The ship ran aground on No Man's Sands, in the Solent and was wrecked.
Jane and Betsey	United Kingdom	The ship ran aground on No Man's Sands. She was on a voyage from Great Yarmouth, Norfolk to Liverpool, Lancashire.
Juliana	United Kingdom	The ship was driven ashore in Studland Bay. She was refloated on 10 March and taken into Poole, Dorset.
Kalipka	United Kingdom	The ship was driven ashore at Sandhead, Hampshire. She was on a voyage from Portsmouth, Hampshire to Jamaica. She was refloated the next day and put back to Portsmouth.
Majestic	United States	The ship was driven ashore and wrecked 31 nautical miles (57 km) west of Boulogne with the loss of eleven of her sixteen crew.

== 10 March ==
List of shipwrecks: 10 March 1842
Ship	State	Description
Alert	United Kingdom	The ship was driven ashore and wrecked at Selsey Bill, Sussex. All on board were rescued. She was on a voyage from London to Portsmouth, Hampshire.
Aletta	Netherlands	The galiot was wrecked off Vlieland, Friesland. Her crew were rescued. She was on a voyage from Newcastle upon Tyne, Northumberland, United Kingdom to Harlingen, Friesland.
Ann and Mary	United Kingdom	The schooner was wrecked at Montrose, Forfarshire with the loss of all but one of her crew.
Betsey	United Kingdom	The sloop was driven ashore and wrecked at Skegness, Lincolnshire. Her crew survived.
Bird	United Kingdom	The ship was wrecked at St Helen's, Isle of Wight.
Brisk	United Kingdom	The schooner capsized and sank off Leigh-on-Sea, Essex with the loss of all nine people on board and four people who went to their rescue. She was refloated on 28 May and towed into Margate, Kent.
Dove	United Kingdom	The fishing smack, a sloop, foundered in the English Channel off Nettlestone, Isle of Wight. Her crew were rescued.
Flora	United Kingdom	The ship was driven ashore and sank at Queenborough, Kent. Her crew were rescued. She was on a voyage from Rochester to Milton Regis.
Flower	United Kingdom	The sloop was driven ashore and wrecked at Hastings, Sussex. Her crew were rescued. She was on a voyage from London to Weymouth, Dorset.
Friendship	United Kingdom	The ship was holed by her anchor and sank at Woodside, Cheshire. She was on a voyage from Newport, Monmouthshire to Liverpool, Lancashire.
Grace	United Kingdom	The ship was driven ashore and wrecked at Port Talbot, Glamorgan. Her crew were rescued. She was on a voyage from Swansea to Port Talbot.
James and Arthur	United Kingdom	The ship was driven ashore and wrecked at Macduff, Aberdeenshire. Her crew were rescued. She was on a voyage from Dingwall, Ross-shire to Sunderland, County Durham.
Jasper	United Kingdom	The ship was driven ashore and wrecked at Cockenzie, Lothian. Her crew were rescued. She was on a voyage from Leith, Lothian to Liverpool, Lancashire.
Maria	Spain	The brig was wrecked at Dungeness, Kent, United Kingdom with the loss of two of her crew. She was on a voyage from Santander, Spain to London.
Marie	France	The ship was driven ashore and wrecked at Dungeness. She was on a voyage from Dunkerque, Nord to Léhon, Côtes-du-Nord.
Mary Ann	United Kingdom	The brig foundered in the English Channel off Beachy Head, Sussex. Her crew were rescued by Traveller (United Kingdom).
Mary Coxon	United Kingdom	The ship collided with another vessel and foundered in the English Channel off the Isle of Wight with the loss of a crew member. Survivors were rescued by True Friends (United Kingdom). Mary Coxon was on a voyage from South Shields, County Durham to Cork.
Minerva	United Kingdom	The ship was wrecked at Calais, France. Her crew were rescued by a lifeboat crewed by men from HMS Widgeon (Royal Navy). She was on a voyage from Sunderland to Jersey, Channel Islands.
Newcastle	United Kingdom	The ship ran aground on the Outer Shoal, in the North Sea off the coast of Suffolk. She was refloated.
Nottingham	United Kingdom	The brig was driven ashore and wrecked at Dungeness. Her crew were rescued. She was on a voyage from Great Yarmouth, Norfolk to Belfast, County Antrim.
St. Jean	France	The schooner was driven ashore and wrecked near Boulogne-sur-Mer, Pas-de-Calais with the loss of all five crew.
St. Lawrence	United Kingdom	The ship ran aground on the Maplin Sand, in the North Sea off the coast of Essex. She was on a voyage from Gravesend, Kent to Malta. She was refloated and taken into Whitstable, Kent.
Sylph	(United Kingdom of Great Britain and Ireland) Jersey	The ship foundered in the English Channel 3 nautical miles (5.6 km) south of Shoreham-by-Sea, Sussex. She was on a voyage from South Shields, County Durham to Jersey.
Thomas	United Kingdom	The ship foundered off Dundee, Forfarshire. Her crew were rescued.
Vigo	United Kingdom	The sloop was wrecked on the Ness Sand, in the Bristol Channel with the loss of all five hands.
Wasp	United Kingdom	The sailing barge was driven ashore and sank at Sheerness, Kent. She was on a voyage from London to Faversham, Kent.
William	United Kingdom	The ship was driven ashore at Livorno, Grand Duchy of Tuscany. She was on a voyage from Livorno to Leith, Lothian. She was refloated the next day and put back to Livorno.
Unknown	France	The sloop was driven ashore and wrecked at Rye, Sussex, United Kingdom with the loss of all seven crew. She was on a voyage from Hamburg to a French port.

== 11 March ==
List of shipwrecks: 11 March 1842
Ship	State	Description
Elizabeth	United States	The ship was wrecked off Cape Clear Island, County Donegal, United Kingdom with the loss of 22 of her 27 crew. She was on a voyage from New Orleans, Louisianato Marseille, Bouches-du-Rhône, France.
Endeavour	United Kingdom	The ship was driven ashore at Dundalk, County Louth. She was on a voyage from Liverpool, Lancashire to Dundakk.
Fame	United Kingdom	The ship was driven ashore at Wissant, Pas-de-Calais, France. She was on a voyage from Stockton-on-Tees, County Durham to Weymouth, Dorset. She was refloated on 15 March and taken into Boulogne, Pas-de-Calais.
Jeune Angelina	France	The ship was driven ashore east of Calais. She was on a voyage from Boulogne to Bordeaux, Gironde.
John and Elizabeth	United Kingdom	The ship was driven ashore east of Gravelines, Pas-de-Calais. Her crew were rescued. She was on a voyage from Montrose, Forfarshire to Southampton, Hampshire.
Kentville	United Kingdom	The ship was wrecked on Barra, Outer Hebrides. Her crew were rescued. She was on a voyage from Glasgow, Renfrewshire to Westport, County Mayo.
Margaret	United Kingdom	The ship was wrecked at the mouth of the Seine. She was on a voyage from Dundee, Forfarshire to Honfleur, Calvados.
Medway	United Kingdom	The steamship ran aground off Puerto Cabello, Venezuela. She was later refloated.
Reform	United Kingdom	The schooner was driven ashore and severely damaged in Loch Maddy. Her crew were rescued. She was refloated on 13 April.
Rover	United Kingdom	The ship was in collision with Lagan (United Kingdom) in the English Channel and was abandoned by her crew. She was on a voyage from Teignmouth, Devon to Newfoundland, British North America. She was subsequently towed into Weymouth, Dorset.
Scotia	United Kingdom	The schooner was driven ashore and severely damaged in Loch Maddy. Her crew were rescued. She was refloated on 13 April.
Thomas	United Kingdom	The sloop sank in the River Tay. Her crew were rescued.
Vigo	United Kingdom	The sloop was wrecked on the Nass Sands, in the Bristol Channel off the coast of Glamorgan with the loss of all hands.
Violet	United Kingdom	The ship was driven ashore at the mouth of the River Spey. She was refloated on 16 March and towed into Fraserburgh, Aberdeenshire.

== 12 March ==
List of shipwrecks: 12 March 1842
Ship	State	Description
Auguste	France	The ship foundered in the English Channel off the coast of Somme.
Clinker	(United Kingdom of Great Britain and Ireland) British North America	The sealer, a schooner, was lost in ice off Cape St. Francis, Newfoundland. Her crew were rescued.
Crystal	United Kingdom	The ship was wrecked on Steep Holm, Somerset.
Falcone	Belgium	The ship was driven ashore at "Fort Frederic". She was on a voyage from Trieste to Antwerp. She was refloated on 19 March and taken into Antwerp.
James and Alexander	United Kingdom	The sloop was wrecked at Macduff, Aberdeenshire. All on board were rescued. She was on a voyage from Dingwall, Ross-shire to Sunderland, County Durham.
Le Commerce de Bordeaux	France	The packet boat was wrecked at the Pointe de La Coubre, Charente-Maritime with the loss of seventeen of the nineteen people on board.
Mary	United Kingdom	The ship was driven ashore at Port Talbot.
Medway	United Kingdom	The steamship was driven ashore on an island 2 nautical miles (3.7 km) north of Puerto Cabello, Venezuela.
Swift	United Kingdom	The ship ran aground on the Goswick Sand Ridge, in the North Sea off the coast of Northumberland. She was on a voyage from Fraserburgh, Aberdeenshire to the Humber. She was refloated on 18 March and taken into Berwick upon Tweed, Northumberland.
Trellissick	United Kingdom	The ship was driven ashore at Port Talbot. She was refloated on 14 March.
Violet	United Kingdom	The ship sprang a leak and was beached 1 nautical mile (1.9 km) south of Fraserburgh, Aberdeenshire.

== 13 March ==
List of shipwrecks: 13 March 1842
Ship	State	Description
Heroine	United Kingdom	The ship was driven ashore in the River Severn at Sharpness, Gloucestershire. She was on a voyage from Gloucester to São Miguel Island, Azores. She was refloated on 13 March and resumed her voyage.
John Anna	United Kingdom	The abandoned ship foundered in the English Channel off Dieppe, Seine-Inférieure.
Mary Anna	United Kingdom	The ship was in collision with Friends (United Kingdom) and foundered in the North Sea off Happisburgh, Norfolk. Her crew were rescued.
William and Jane	United Kingdom	The ship ran aground on the Foreness Rock, Margate, Kent. She was on a voyage from Port Madoc, Caernarfonshire to London. She was refloated and resumed her voyage.
Yucathaco	Spain	The ship was driven ashore and wrecked in the "Gribow River". Her crew were rescued.

== 14 March ==
List of shipwrecks: 14 March 1842
Ship	State	Description
Acorn	United Kingdom	The ship sprang a leak whilst on a voyage from Blyth, Northumberland to Memel, Prussia. She put back into South Shields, County Durham, where she was beached.
William Hannington	United Kingdom	The ship was driven ashore at Rattray Head, Aberdeenshire. She was on a voyage from South Shields, County Durham to New York, United States. She was refloated and resumed her voyage.

== 15 March ==
List of shipwrecks: 15 March 1842
Ship	State	Description
Athol	(United Kingdom of Great Britain and Ireland) Tobago	The drogher ran aground on the Baccar Reefs. She capsized and was wrecked.
Success	United Kingdom	The ship was wrecked on the Cefn Sidn Sands, Glamorgan with the loss of a crew member.
Mary Ann	(United Kingdom of Great Britain and Ireland) South Australia	The cutter was abandoned in Coffins Bay.
Swallow	(United Kingdom of Great Britain and Ireland) New South Wales	The cutter was wrecked at "Jerringong" with the loss of two of her crew.

== 16 March ==
List of shipwrecks: 16 March 1842
Ship	State	Description
Rapid	(United Kingdom of Great Britain and Ireland) Saint Vincent	The drogher was lost in Union Bay.

== 17 March ==
List of shipwrecks: 17 March 1842
Ship	State	Description
Admiral Lake	United Kingdom	The ship was wrecked on the south east coast of Barbuda. Her crew were rescued. She was on a voyage from the Clyde to Penzance, Cornwall and Antigua.
Emerald	(United Kingdom of Great Britain and Ireland) British North America	The brig was wrecked in Anotto Bay, Jamaica. Her crew were rescued.
Gurnet	United Kingdom	The smack was driven ashore and capsized at Swansea, Glamorgan with the loss of both crew.
Nibbs	(United Kingdom of Great Britain and Ireland) Jamaica	The sloop was wrecked at Port Maria. Her crew were rescued.
Pirie	United States	The ship was driven ashore on Cape Sable Island, Nova Scotia, British North America. She was on a voyage from Philadelphia, Pennsylvania to Halifax, Nova Scotia.
Prince Oscar	United Kingdom	The ship was driven ashore and wrecked at Popo, Dahomey. Her crew were rescued.
Rose	(United Kingdom of Great Britain and Ireland) Jamaica	The sloop was wrecked in Rio Nuevo Bay. Her crew were rescued.

== 18 March ==
List of shipwrecks: 18 March 1842
Ship	State	Description
Amelia	United States	The ship was wrecked on Eierland, North Holland, Netherlands with the loss of two of her crew. She was on a voyage Philadelphia, Pennsylvania to Hamburg.
Messenger	United Kingdom	The ship was driven ashore at South Foreland, Kent. She was on a voyage from Newcastle upon Tyne, Northumberland to Bordeaux, Gironde, France. Messenger was refloated and taken into Ramsgate, Kent in a sinking condition.
Neptune	United Kingdom	The paddle steamer ran aground off South Shields, County Durham. She was on a voyage from Hull, Yorkshire to South Shields.
Pensée	France	The ship ran aground off the Île de Noirmoutier, Vendée. She was on a voyage from Nantes, Loire-Inférieure to Guadeloupe.
Zoe	Austrian Empire	The brig was run aground on the Northern Haaks, in the North Sea off the coast of the Netherlands. She was on a voyage from Bahia, Brazil to Hamburg. She was refloated and taken into the Nieuw Diep.

== 19 March ==
List of shipwrecks: 19 March 1842
Ship	State	Description
Clarion	United States	The steam barque was driven ashore and wrecked on Cuba. All on board were rescued. She was on a voyage from New Orleans, Louisiana to New York.
Hawk	United Kingdom	The ship was driven ashore at Porthdinllaen, Caernarfonshire. Her crew were rescued. She was on a voyage from Liverpool, Lancashire to Marseille, Bouches-du-Rhône, France. Hawk was refloated on 24 March and taken into Caernarfon.
Heron	United Kingdom	The ship was driven ashore and wrecked at Porthdinllaen. All on board were rescued. She was on a voyage from Liverpool to Malta.
Mariner	United Kingdom	The sloop was in collision with Ashley and foundered in the Bristol Channel off Lundy Island, Devon. Her crew were rescued.

== 20 March ==
List of shipwrecks: 20 March 1842
Ship	State	Description
Angerona	United Kingdom	The ship sprang a leak in Faura Bay and was consequently beached in Kro Bay, Sierra Leone.
Mary Ann Wade	(United Kingdom of Great Britain and Ireland) New Zealand	The schooner capsized during a trial at Wellington with the loss of one of the ten people on board. The ship had been insufficiently ballasted and was using sails too large for her
Olive and Eliza	United Kingdom	The ship, which had previously been struck by lightning and set on fire, was scuttled at "Porto Rico", Azores. She was on a voyage from Cardiff, Glamorgan to the Azores.
Union	United Kingdom	The ship was wrecked off the Cordouan Lighthouse, Gironde, France with the loss of all hands. She was on a voyage from Newcastle upon Tyne, Northumberland to Bordeaux, Gironde.

== 21 March ==
List of shipwrecks: 21 March 1842
Ship	State	Description
Billy Boy	United Kingdom	The smack was run down and sunk in the River Thames by HMS Blazer (Royal Navy). Her crew were rescued.
Blazer	Royal Navy	The Tartarus-class gunvessel ran ashore at Seaford Head, Sussex. She was on a voyage from Portsmouth, Hampshire to Woolwich, Kent. She was refloated and resumed her voyage.
Hebe	United Kingdom	The ship sprang a leak and was beached at Milford Haven, Pembrokeshire. She was on a voyage from Liverpool, Lancashire to Wisbech, Cambridgeshire. She had become a wreck by 26 March.
Henrietta	United Kingdom	The ship was driven ashore 36 nautical miles (67 km) from the Laguna de Términos, Mexico. She was refloated on 31 March and taken into "Laguira".
Heroine	United Kingdom	The ship was wrecked near "Laguna". Her crew were rescued.

== 22 March ==
List of shipwrecks: March 1842
Ship	State	Description
Expedition	United Kingdom	The ship was driven ashore and wrecked at Eyemouth, Berwickshire. Her three crew were rescued. She was on a voyage from Alloa, Clackmannanshire to Newcastle upon Tyne, Northumberland.

== 23 March ==
List of shipwrecks: 23 March 1842
Ship	State	Description
Amable Rosarita	Spain	The ship was driven ashore at West Cowes, Isle of Wight, United Kingdom. She was on a voyage from Havana, Cuba to Hamburg. She was refloated and taken into Cowes, Isle of Wight.
Mary Ann	United Kingdom	The ship was driven ashore at Stranraer, Wigtownshire. She was refloated on 30 March.
Superb	United Kingdom	The schooner departed from Messina, Sicily for Cork. No further trace, presumed foundered with the loss of all hands.
Vigilence	Norway	The brig ran aground on the Long Sand, in the North Sea off the coast of Essex, United Kingdom. She was on a voyage from Gothenburg, Sweden to Havre de Grâce, Seine-Inférieure, France. Vigilence was refloated and put into Ramsgate, Kent, United Kingdom in a wrecked condition on 24 March.

== 24 March ==
List of shipwrecks: 24 March 1842
Ship	State	Description
Argo	United Kingdom	The ship was driven ashore at Workington, Cumberland.
Elephant	United Kingdom	The ship struck the quayside at Workington and was severely damaged. She was on a voyage from Liverpool, Lancashire to Workington.

== 25 March ==
List of shipwrecks: 25 March 1842
Ship	State	Description
Agnes Sophia	United Kingdom	The schooner was driven into the ship, which was then driven ashore at South Shields, County Durham. She was on a voyage from South Shields to Genoa, Kingdom of Sardinia.
Albinia	United Kingdom	The ship foundered in the Atlantic Ocean 50 nautical miles (93 km) north west of Tory Island, County Donegal with the loss of two of her crew. She was on a voyage from South Shields, County Durham to Jamaica.
Ann and Jane	United Kingdom	The ship was driven ashore at Greenock, Renfrewshire. She was refloated on 29 March.
Ann and Susan	United Kingdom	The ship was driven ashore at Greenock.
Bee	United Kingdom	The ship was driven ashore at Cairnryan, Wigtownshire. She was refloated on 30 March.
Betsey and Mary	United Kingdom	The schooner foundered off the Firth of Forth with the loss of all hands. She was on a voyage from Newcastle upon Tyne, Northumberland to Perth.
Catherine	United Kingdom	The ship was driven ashore at Cairnryan. She was refloated on 30 March.
Dalkeith	United Kingdom	The ship was driven ashore at Greenock.
Dunn	United Kingdom	The ship was driven ashore at Flamborough Head, Yorkshire. Her crew were rescued.
Earl Grey	United Kingdom	The ship was driven ashore at Greenock. She was refloated on 29 March.
Endeavour	United Kingdom	The brig was driven ashore at Ayr.
Fame	United States	The ship ran aground on the Middelbank, in the North Sea off the coast of Zeeland, Netherlands. She was on a voyage from Antwerp, Belgium to New York.
Fanny	United Kingdom	The ship was driven ashore at "Cadadyke", Renfrewshire. She was on a voyage from Genoa, Kingdom of Sardinia to Glasgow, Renfrewshire.
Fanny	United Kingdom	The smack was driven ashore north of Ayr. she was on a voyage from Newry, County Antrim to Glasgow.
Good Intent	United Kingdom	The ship was driven ashore at Quillebeuf-sur-Seine, Eure, France. She was refloated with assistance from the steamship Honfleur (France) and taken into Quillebeuf-sur-Seine.
Helen	United Kingdom	The ship was driven ashore and severely damaged at Troon, Ayrshire.
Henry	United Kingdom	The ship was driven ashore at Greenock.
Ino	United Kingdom	The ship was driven ashore at Greenock.
Janet	United Kingdom	The ship was driven ashore and damaged at Troon.
Liberty	United Kingdom	The ship was wrecked on the Haisborough Sands, in the North Sea off the coast of Norfolk. Her crew were rescued. She was on a voyage from Dover, Kent to Newcastle upon Tyne, Northumberland.
Margarets	United Kingdom	The ship was driven ashore and damaged on the Isle of Whithorn, Wigtownshire. Her crew were rescued. She was refloated on 28 March.
Maria	United Kingdom	The ship was driven ashore near Kirkcudbright. She was refloated on 2 April.
Mary Ann	United Kingdom	The ship was driven ashore at Stranraer, Wigtownshire. She was refloated on 30 March.
Native	United Kingdom	The schooner was driven ashore on Holy Isle, in the Firth of Clyde.
New Liberty	United Kingdom	The schooner was driven ashore south of Ayr.
Ruth	United Kingdom	The ship was driven ashore and severely damaged at Troon.
Scotland	(United Kingdom of Great Britain and Ireland) British North America	The barque was driven ashore at Greenock. She was refloated on 29 March.
HMS Skylark	Royal Navy	The Cherokee-class brig-sloop was driven ashore at Greenock. She was refloated and taken into port.
Susan and Isabella	United Kingdom	The ship capsized off "Esdaile", Argyllshire. She was subsequently righted.
Tarbolton	United Kingdom	The ship was driven ashore and severely damaged at Troon.
Trio	United Kingdom	The smack was driven ashore and damaged at Greenock. She was refloated on 29 March.
Unanimity	United Kingdom	The schooner was driven ashore at Greenock. She was refloated on 29 March.
Warrior	United Kingdom	The ship was driven ashore and severely damaged at Troon.
Wexford	United Kingdom	The barque was driven ashore at Greenock. She was refloated on 29 March.

== 26 March ==
List of shipwrecks: 26 March 1842
Ship	State	Description
Britannia	United Kingdom	The ship was wrecked on the Newton Rock. Her crew were rescued.
Dunns	United Kingdom	The ship was driven ashore at Flamborough Head, Yorkshire.
Francis	United Kingdom	The ship was wrecked near Skegness, Lincolnshire. She was on a voyage from King's Lynn, Norfolk to Leeds, Yorkshire.
Jonge Margaretha	Flag unknown	The ship was driven ashore near Libava, Courland Governorate. Her crew were rescued. She was on a voyage from "Dodrich" to Liepāja.
Juventus	United Kingdom	The ship was driven ashore at Rathmullen, County Donegal. she was on a voyage from Glasgow, Renfrewshire to Sligo.
Margaretha	Sweden	The ship was driven ashore near "Haneroe", Norway with the loss of at least six crew. She was on a voyage from Visby to London, United Kingdom.
Nancy	United Kingdom	The full-rigged ship foundered in the North Sea 180 nautical miles (330 km) off Tynemouth, Northumberland. Her crew were rescued by Eliza and Ann (United Kingdom). She was on a voyage from Newcastle upon Tyne, Northumberland to Copenhagen, Denmark.
Pink	United Kingdom	The brigantine was driven ashore and severely damaged near Tarbert, Argyllshire. She was on a voyage from Great Yarmouth, Norfolk to Belfast, County Antrim.
Scotia	United Kingdom	The ship was driven ashore at Sandhead, Wigtownshire. She was refloated on 30 March.
Wellington	United Kingdom	The ship was wrecked on the Red Stone Bank, in Liverpool Bay. Her crew were rescued. She was on a voyage from Caernarfon to Liverpool, Lancashire.

== 27 March ==
List of shipwrecks: 27 March 1842
Ship	State	Description
Albion	United Kingdom	The ship was driven ashore and wrecked at Port Helen, Islay. she was on a voyage from Troon, Ayrshire to Donegal.
Jessie	United Kingdom	The sloop foundered with the loss of all hands. She was on a voyage from Whitehaven, Cumberland to Palnackie, Kirkcudbrightshire.
Karen Elize	Norway	The schooner was driven ashore in a capsized state at Thisted, Denmark, where she was wrecked the next day.
Margaret McDougal	United Kingdom	The ship was driven ashore at Port Helen.
Margaret McKenzie and Toward Castle	United Kingdom	Margaret McKenzie was driven into Toward Castle and was scuttled at Port Helen. Toward Castle was consequently beached.
Undine	United Kingdom	The ship was abandoned off Port Helen. She was on a voyage from Belfast, County Antrim to Ballina, County Mayo.
Vintage	United Kingdom	The ship was discovered abandoned in the North Sea, having been in collision with another vessel. She was towed into Bridlington, Yorkshire by Union (United Kingdom).
Ythan	United Kingdom	The ship was abandoned in the North Sea. She was on a voyage from South Shields, County Durham to Copenhagen, Denmark.

== 28 March ==
List of shipwrecks: 28 March 1842
Ship	State	Description
Carolina	Sweden	The brig was driven ashore on "Onrust". She was on a voyage from Antwerp, Belgium to Stockholm.
Christian VIII	Denmark	The ship ran ashore on Neuwark. She was on a voyage from Cette. Hérault, France to Hamburg. She was refloated and taken into Cuxhaven.
Christoval Colon	Sweden	The ship was driven ashore 2 nautical miles (3.7 km) west of Shoreham-by-Sea, Sussex, United Kingdom. She was on a voyage from Lisbon, Portugal to Stockholm. She was refloated and made for Ramsgate, Kent, United Kingdom.
Elizabeth Maria	Duchy of Holstein	The ship was wrecked on Neuwark. She was on a voyage from Christiansand, Norway to Husum.
Fortuna	Kingdom of Hanover	The ship was wrecked on Neuwark. She was on a voyage from Kragerø, Norway to Emden.
John and Eliza	United Kingdom	The ship was driven ashore and wrecked at Beachy Head, Sussex. She was on a voyage from London to Shoreham-by-Sea and Cowes, Isle of Wight.
Santo Antonio	Portugal	The brig was wrecked near Hout Bay, Cape Colony.

== 29 March ==
List of shipwrecks: 29 March 1842
Ship	State	Description
Aurora	United Kingdom	The paddle steamer was in collision with the paddle steamer Nymph (United Kingdom) in the River Thames at Greenwich, Kent. All on board Aurora were rescued by the steamboats Waterman No. 3 and Waterman No. 5 (both United Kingdom).
Henrietta Sophia	Russian Empire	The ship ran aground in the Bosphorus.
Opreisnitgen	Denmark	The galiot was driven ashore on Sylt, Duchy of Holstein.
HMS Pantaloon	Royal Navy	The brig ran aground in the Bissau Channel.
Patriot	United Kingdom	The ship ran aground on the Herscholmens. She was on a voyage from Arbroath, Forfarshire to Riga, Russia. She was refloated and put into Helsingør, Denmark for repairs.
Stockton	United Kingdom	The ship was driven ashore near Cap Français, Haiti. She was on a voyage from Swansea, Glamorgan to Cuba.

== 30 March ==
List of shipwrecks: 30 March 1842
Ship	State	Description
Duchess of Clarence	United Kingdom	The ship ran aground on the Burbo Bank, in Liverpool Bay. She was on a voyage from Liverpool, Lancashire to Calcutta, India. She was refloated and put back to Liverpool.
Mary Thompson	United Kingdom	The ship was driven ashore and wrecked at Mapou, Mauritius. She was on a voyage from London to Mauritius.
Severn	United Kingdom	The steamship was damaged by fire at Hamburg.

== 31 March ==
List of shipwrecks: 31 March 1842
Ship	State	Description
Aimable Eliza	France	The lugger sprang a leak and was beached at Filey, Yorkshire, United Kingdom. She was on a voyage from Caen, Calvados to Sunderland, County Durham, United Kingdom.
Charlotte	Belgium	The ship was wrecked on the Scotsman sand, in the Veere Channel. She was on a voyage from Stockholm, Sweden to Antwerp.
Cornelia	United Kingdom	The schooner ran aground at Montrose, Forfarshire. She was on a voyage from South Shields, County Durham to Wick, Caithness. She was refloated and taken into Montrose.
Oak	United Kingdom	The brig ran aground on the See-sand, in the North Sea off the coast of the Duchy of Holstein and was abandoned by her crew. She was on a voyage from Sunderland to Hamburg. She capsized on 2 April and was wrecked.

== Unknown date ==
List of shipwrecks: Unknown date in March 1842
Ship	State	Description
Anne	United Kingdom	The brig foundered off Formosa. Her 57 crew were taken prisoner by the Chinese and were mistreated. Some of them died. Eight people were set free and 46 died or were executed in Tainan in August 1842.
Breeze	United States	The ship was wrecked on the Colorados, off the coast of Cuba before 7 March. Her crew were rescued.
Flora	United Kingdom	The full-rigged ship was wrecked in Anotto Bay, Jamaica in late March.
James	United Kingdom	The ship was dismasted in the North Sea and was abandoned by her crew. She was subsequently taken into Blyth, Northumberland, where she arrived on 9 March.
John & Eliza	United Kingdom	The ship was driven ashore at Beachy Head, Sussex. She was on a voyage from London to Shoreham-by-Sea, Sussex.
St. Mary's	United Kingdom	The barque was wrecked in Anotto Bay in late March.
Thomas Daniel	United Kingdom	The ship was wrecked at Bonny, Africa before 28 March.
Topaz	France	The ship departed from Île Bourbon for a French port between 12 and 18 March. No further trace, presumed foundered with the loss of all hands.
