= Ben Smith (musician) =

American jazz saxophonist and clarinetist

Benjamin J. Smith (born March 1, 1905, date of death unknown) was an American jazz alto saxophonist, tenor saxophonist and clarinetist. He was born in Memphis.

== Early career ==
In the early 1920s, Smith played with local Memphis jazz bands before going on the road with territory bands such as the Connor and McWilliams Boston Serenaders, William Holloway and the Merrymakers, and Eli Rice's Plantation Cotton Pickers.

In Kansas City he led his own bands and in 1930 played with George E. Lee and then in Pennsylvania led his own White Hut Orchestra and worked with Blanche Calloway and Charlie Gaines.

Around that time he recorded with the Washboard Rhythm Kings.

Arriving in New York City in 1934, he worked with Benny Carter, Claude Hopkins, and Hot Lips Page and into the 1940s worked in the bands of Lucky Millinder, Andy Kirk, Snub Mosley, among others.

He co-wrote "I Dreamt I Dwelt in Harlem".

== Discography ==
- 1951: "By the Candleglow" / "Slippery Smith" - Ben Smith Quartet (Savoy), with Pete Martin, Artie Long, Bob Bushnell.
