= Triangle Music Publishing Co. =

New York publisher of popular music

Triangle Music Publishing Co., Inc. was an American publisher of popular music based in New York City. It was founded in 1919 by Joseph Medford Davis (1896–1978), with the help of George F. Briegel (1890–1968), a trombonist and former bandmaster at the Pelham Bay Naval Station.

== History ==
Davis created the firm to rival black publishers. He, himself, was white. Davis issued mostly blues and popular songs written by blacks. Davis dropped the Triangle imprint in the 1930s and replaced it with Joe Davis, Inc. He sold the firm in 1939 and went into the record manufacturing business, becoming a major independent record salesman as well.

== Selected songwriters ==
His songwriters/composers, in alphabetical order, included:

- Victor Arden (1893–1962)
- Paul Denniker (né Paul Albert Dehnicke; 1897–1967)
- Fletcher Henderson (1897–1952)
- Alex Hill (1906–1937)
- Claude Hopkins (1903–1984)
- J. C. Johnson (1896–1981)
- Andy Razaf (1895–1973)
- Carson Robison (1890–1957)
- Chris Smith (1879–1949) ‡
- Wilbur Sweatman (1882–1961)
- Fats Waller (1904–1943)
- Spencer Williams (1889–1965)

––––––––––––––––––––

‡ Chris Smith had previously published eleven works with Gotham-Attucks Music Publishing Company and one with its Attucks Music Publishing Company, its pre-merger predecessor. Gotham-Attucks was a New York-based firm owned and operated from 1904 to 1911 by African Americans.
