= Albinia (name) =

Albinia is a feminine given name and a surname. Notable people with the name include:

== Given name ==
- Albinia Hobart (1737/8–1816), British celebrity
- Albinia Jones, known as Albennie Jones (1914–1989), American singer
- Albinia Wherry (1857–1929), British nurse and author

== Surname ==
- Alice Albinia (born 1976), English journalist and author
