= Ralph Willis (blues musician) =

American singer

- Also known as: Ralph "Bama" Willis; Alabama Slim; Washboard Pete; Sleepy Joe
- Born: c. 1910; Near Birmingham, Alabama, United States (possible)
- Died: June 11, 1957 New York, New York, United States
- Genres: Piedmont blues, country blues
- Occupations: Singer, guitarist, songwriter
- Instruments: Vocals, guitar
- Years active: Late 1930s–1953
- Labels: Savoy Records; King Records; Various

Ralph Willis (c. 1910 – June 11, 1957) was an American Piedmont blues and country blues singer, guitarist and songwriter. Some of his Savoy records were released under the pseudonyms Washboard Pete, Alabama Slim, and Sleepy Joe. His famous song is "Christmas Blues" (credited to Washboard Pete).

== Biography ==
Sources suggest that Willis was born either near Birmingham, Alabama, or at Irvin, Wilkes County, Georgia. In the late 1930s, he moved to North Carolina and started to play with musicians who were familiar with Blind Boy Fuller. Willis made his first recordings in 1944 and continued recording until 1953, issuing fifty tracks on several labels, including Savoy, Signature, 20th Century, Abbey, Jubilee, Prestige, Par, and King.

Like Gabriel Brown, Alec Seward and Brownie McGhee, Willis relocated to New York City. At first he was recorded on his own, but eventually his record companies frequently paired him with accompanists. Judson Coleman joined Willis on his 20th Century recordings, and McGhee was employed in 1949. McGhee and Sonny Terry contributed to Willis's later recordings.

Willis played in various musical styles, from slow blues to up-tempo country dance tracks. However, he spurned the growing popularity of folk blues and R&B. He was musically conscious of Blind Lemon Jefferson and Luke Jordan, but in his later recordings his guitar style leaned towards the booming resonance of Lightnin' Hopkins.

Willis died in New York City in June 1957, a week before his 48th birthday. His cause of death was unknown.

== Selected discography ==
=== Albums ===
- Faded Picture Blues (King, 1970)
- Carolina Blues (Blues Classics, 1974)
- Ralph Willis Vol. 1 1944–1951 (Document, 1994)
- Ralph Willis Vol. 2 1951–1953 (Document, 1994)
- Hop on Down the Line: The (Almost) Complete Recordings (Jasmine, 2019)

=== Singles (selected) ===
- "Cool That Thing" (1949)
- "Shake That Thing" (1949)
- "Alabama Blues" (1961)
- "More Ralph Willis" (1971)
- "Boar Hog Blues" (1971)

== See also ==
- List of country blues musicians
- List of Piedmont blues musicians
