= Gabriel Brown =

American Piedmont blues singer and guitarist

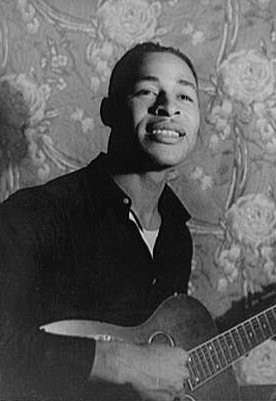
- Brown, photographed by Carl Van Vechten in 1935

Background information
- Born: September 2, 1910; Gretna, Florida, United States
- Died: May 7, 1960 (aged 49) off Bradley Beach, New Jersey, U.S.
- Genres: Piedmont blues
- Occupations: Singer, guitarist, songwriter, actor
- Instruments: Vocals, guitar
- Years active: 1935–1952
- Label: Various

Gabriel Brown (September 2, 1910 – May 7, 1960) was an American Piedmont blues singer, guitarist, and actor.

== Biography ==
Brown was born in Gretna, Gadsden County, Florida, the son of Mattie (née Gainous) and Steve Brown Jr.. The family moved to Eatonville before 1918. According to some sources, Brown graduated from the Florida Agricultural and Mechanical College, but this is unconfirmed. In the 1920s, the family moved to Linden, New Jersey, where Brown worked as a laborer in a chemical plant.

He learned guitar, and played with the Sun-to-Sun Singers, a vocal group associated with folklorist Zora Neale Hurston. In 1934, he performed at the first National Folk Festival in St. Louis, Missouri. Hurston enlisted Alan Lomax, who recorded Brown for the Library of Congress in June 1935.

Like Ralph Willis, Alec Seward and Brownie McGhee, Brown then relocated to New York City. Hurston gave Brown a part in her light opera Polk County, and arranged for him to be photographed by Carl Van Vechten. In 1935, Brown started a four-year tenure as an actor and musician with the Federal Theatre Project, and appeared in several productions including the version of Macbeth known as Voodoo Macbeth, staged by Orson Welles. By the late 1930s, Brown performed as a singer on Cincinnati radio and took part in the show St. Louis 'Oman. He found employment with the civil service, working for the Army Signal Corps in Asbury Park, New Jersey.

His first full recording session was in 1943, produced by Joe Davis, and the pair worked together until Brown's final sessions in 1952. In 1945 Brown sang, "I can't have no luck at all, the jinx is on me."

Several of Brown's recordings were not released during his lifetime, and some of those that were issued were not promoted tastefully or accurately. In the late 1940s, various tracks were licensed to Coral Records. Eventually Davis worked in A&R for MGM Records, and Brown followed him to that label, where he was promoted as a pop singer. Compilation albums of his recordings have been released by various labels.

Brown died by drowning after a boating accident off the coast of New Jersey in 1960. Some sources state erroneously that his death occurred in Florida in 1972.

== Selected discography ==
- Gabriel Brown and His Guitar 1943–1945 (Policy Wheel, 1976)
- Gabriel Brown 1944–1952 (Krazy Kat, 1983)
- Gabriel Brown: Mean Old Blues 1943–1948 (Flyright, 1996)
- Gabriel Brown (Catfish Records, 2001)

== See also ==
- List of Piedmont blues musicians
