= Erskine Butterfield =

American singer-songwriter

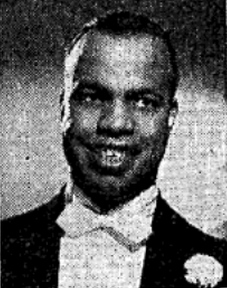
Erskine Butterfield

Erskine Butterfield (February 9, 1913 – July 11, 1961) was an American pianist, singer, bandleader and composer, active in the 1930s to the 1950s, and best known for his boogie-woogie and swing piano style. Butterfield was credited with "helping to invent the style of 'cocktail piano'".

== Biography ==
Born in Syracuse, New York, Butterfield played piano at an early age when his family moved to Newark, New Jersey, where he later studied piano. In the 1930s, he regularly appeared on radio, including WOR in New York City, and played with Noble Sissle's orchestra. He made his first sound recording and reproduction in 1937 on the Variety record label. In 1938, he signed with Decca Records, for which he recorded over forty titles between 1940 and 1942, many of which were released. Butterfield was called the "Singing Vagabond of the Keys" by the Chicago Defender in 1939. He "was innovative in utilizing black and white musicians together in his combo", which included session musicians such as Jimmy Lytell (clarinet), Carmen Mastren (guitar), and Haig Stevens (bass).

In 1939, Butterfield signed with Joe Davis of Beacon Records, with whom he would maintain a long-term relationship. In 1943, Butterfield was drafted, but continued to play in a group including such musicians as Slim Furness (guitar), Eugene Brooks (drums) and Lynwood Jones (upright bass), and he cut V-Discs in 1945. In 1944, he recorded eight titles for Joe Davis under the name Erskine Butterfield and his Blue Boys.

Butterfield's "light swing and traditional piano phrases" resulted in some of his songs, such as "Lovin' Man" and "Because Of You," being used in film soundtracks.

After World War II, Butterfield formed a trio and toured extensively, but his music style was less successful commercially. He recorded for a number of small labels in the late 1940s, after which his recording activity dropped off. In 1956, however, he again recorded a number of titles for Joe Davis with a reformed group, Butterfield and his Blue Boys, including musicians such as Sam "The Man" Taylor (saxophone) and Panama Francis (drums).

Butterfield made appearances on The Nat King Cole Show, The Tony Martin Program and The Jo Stafford Show.

He died on July 11, 1961, in New York City.

== Partial discography ==
=== 78s ===
==== Decca Records ====
===== Popular series =====
- Tuxedo Junction b/w Salt Butter No. 3042A&B Feb. 21, 1940
- Darn that Dream b/w Inconvenience No. 3043A&B Feb. 21, 1940
- Your Feet's Too Big b/w What's Cooking No. 3209A&B May 27, 1940
- The Down Home Blues b/w Nothin' to Do No. 3252A&B May 3, 1940
- Boogie Woogie St. Louis Blues b/w Chocolate No. 3356A&B Aug. 9, 1940
- Pushin' the Conversation Along b/w Don't Leave Me Now No. 3357A&B Aug. 9, 1940
- Sleepy Town Train b/w You Made Me Care No. 4360A&B July 23, 1942
- Birmingham Special b/w Jumpin' in the Julep Joint No. 4400A&B July 23, 1942

===== Sepia series =====
- Beale Street Mama b/w Whatcha Know, Joe? No. 8510 Nov. 15, 1940
- Jivin' the Missouri Waltz b/w Stayin' at Home No. 8524A&B Nov. 15, 1940
- Paradiddle Joe b/w All the Time No. 8539 Feb. 28, 1941
- Blackberry Jam b/w Monday's Wash No. 8543 Feb. 28, 1941
- Because of You b/w You Might have Belonged to Another No. 8551A&B Apr. 29, 1941
- I Dreamt I Dwelt in Harlem b/w Jelly, Jelly No. 8552 Apr. 29, 1941
- Foo-Gee b/w You Should Live So Long No. 8569A&B July 24, 1941
- You Done Lost Your Good Thing Now b/w Cheatin' on Me No. 8576A&B July 24, 1941
- I was a Fool to Let You Go b/w Honey Dear No. 8588 Oct. 23, 1941
- If Money Grew on Trees b/w Mama Long and Tall No. 8596 Oct. 23, 1941
- The Devil Sat Down and Cried b/w Boogie De Concerto No. 8600 Jan. 13, 1942
- Lovin' Man b/w Crazy Blues No. 8620 Jan. 13, 1942

=== Vinyl ===
- Erskine Butterfield and his Blue Boys, Tuesday at Ten. Probably recorded in 1941 by World Broadcasting, Inc., for radio broadcast, and released on vinyl in 1983 by Circle Records, No CLP-62. (Music written by Butterfield is indicated by his name in parentheses following the title.)
  - Tuesday at Ten
  - A Zoot Suit (Butterfield)
  - Blackberry Jam (Butterfield)
  - Something's Bound to Happen
  - Lighthouse (Butterfield)
  - Monday's Wash (Butterfield)
  - J.P. Dooley, III
  - The Boogie Beat'll Get You
  - Flying Home
  - You Should Live So Long
- 1944-1956/Part-Time Boogie. Eight titles recorded at WOR Studios, New York, on August 17, 1944, and 10 titles recorded at Mastertone Studios, New York, on June 13, 1956, but released in 1957. Harlequin Records, 1986, No. HQ 2050. All are original Butterfield compositions.

(1944)

  - Lighthouse
  - Part Time Boogie
  - Saturday Night Twist
  - Piano Cocktail
  - Boogie Woogie Barcarolle
  - Fantasy in Blue
  - Six-Thirty Express
  - Dream Time

(1956)

  - Blackberry Jam
  - Light-House
  - Part-Time Boogie
  - Piano Cocktail
  - Saturday Nite Twist
  - Chocolate
  - Monday's Wash (Butterfield's theme song on WOR radio)
  - Six-Thirty Express
  - Piano Time
  - Movin' Along

== Other sources ==
- Bruce Bastin, Sleeve notes for Erskine Butterfield, 1944-1957/Part-Time Boogie (including unsigned sleeve notes from 1957 album Piano Cocktail). Harlequin HQ 2050 (1986).
- Frank Driggs, Sleeve notes to Erskine Butterfield and His Blue Boys, Tuesday at Ten, Circle Records, 1983.
- The Online Discographical Project
- Sharon A. Pease, "Erskine Butterfield Is Jack of All Trades", Down Beat, VIII (Dec. 1, 1941), 16.
