= Hold Tight (Sidney Bechet song) =

Single by Sidney Bechet
- Released: 1938
- Label: Vocalion
- Songwriter(s): Leonard Ware, Sidney Bechet

"Hold Tight, Hold Tight (Want Some Seafood Mama)", commonly known as "Hold Tight", is a 1938 Sidney Bechet song, composed by Bechet's guitarist Leonard Ware and two session singers with claimed contributions from Bechet himself. The song became known for what at the time were considered suggestive lyrics, and then for a series of lawsuits over songwriter royalties.

== History ==
Bechet recorded the song in his first recording session as bandleader with Ware and "The Two Fishmongers" as vocalists – uncredited but later identified as Willie Spottswood and Eddie Robinson.

At the same time two white dancers, Jerry Brandow and Lenny Kent, had approached the Andrews Sisters' manager Lou Levy with the song, claiming it was a traditional jazz tune, and five days after Bechet's recording, the Andrews Sisters recorded the song – with cleaner lyrics and a modified introduction, as "Hold Tight-Hold Tight (Want Some Sea Food Mama)," with Jimmy Dorsey's band. Their recording was a considerable hit, followed by another notable version by Fats Waller a few months later in January 1939.

Waller's gravelly voice and the double entendre lyrics contributed to the song's success.

Although the song had been played around jazz clubs for years, the Andrews Sisters hit provoked the first royalty cases – the royalties being awarded to the two dancers who had "discovered" the song, Brandow and Kent, then to Bechet's recording session team: guitarist Leonard Ware and singers Eddie Robinson and Willie Spottswood. Other claims for parts of the song were made by Sy Oliver, Count Basie, Gene Krupa, the singer Jerry Kruger, and trumpeter Taps Miller. However, Sidney Bechet continued to claim partial credit for the lyrics, saying they had been written back in 1924 but that pianist Clarence Williams had decided not to publish and register the lyrics as they were then considered too suggestive. Eventually the two dancers Brandow and Kent were removed from the song's copyright, and the Catalog of Copyright Entries of the Library of Congress Copyright Office (1968) lists the copyright for "Hold Tight, Hold Tight (Want Some Seafood Mama)" as only "Leonard W. Ware, Willie Spottswood & George Robinson."
