= Jersey Bounce =

"Jersey Bounce" is a song written by Tiny Bradshaw, Eddie Johnson, and Bobby Plater with lyrics by Buddy Feyne who used the pseudonym Robert B. Wright.

== Background ==
It hit No. 1 for four weeks in 1942 as an instrumental recorded by Benny Goodman and his orchestra. It also charted that same year by Jimmy Dorsey (No. 9) and Shep Fields (No. 15). Versions of "Jersey Bounce" were performed by Glenn Miller, Harry James, Red Norvo, Jan Savitt, Ella Fitzgerald, Ella Mae Morse, and The King Sisters.

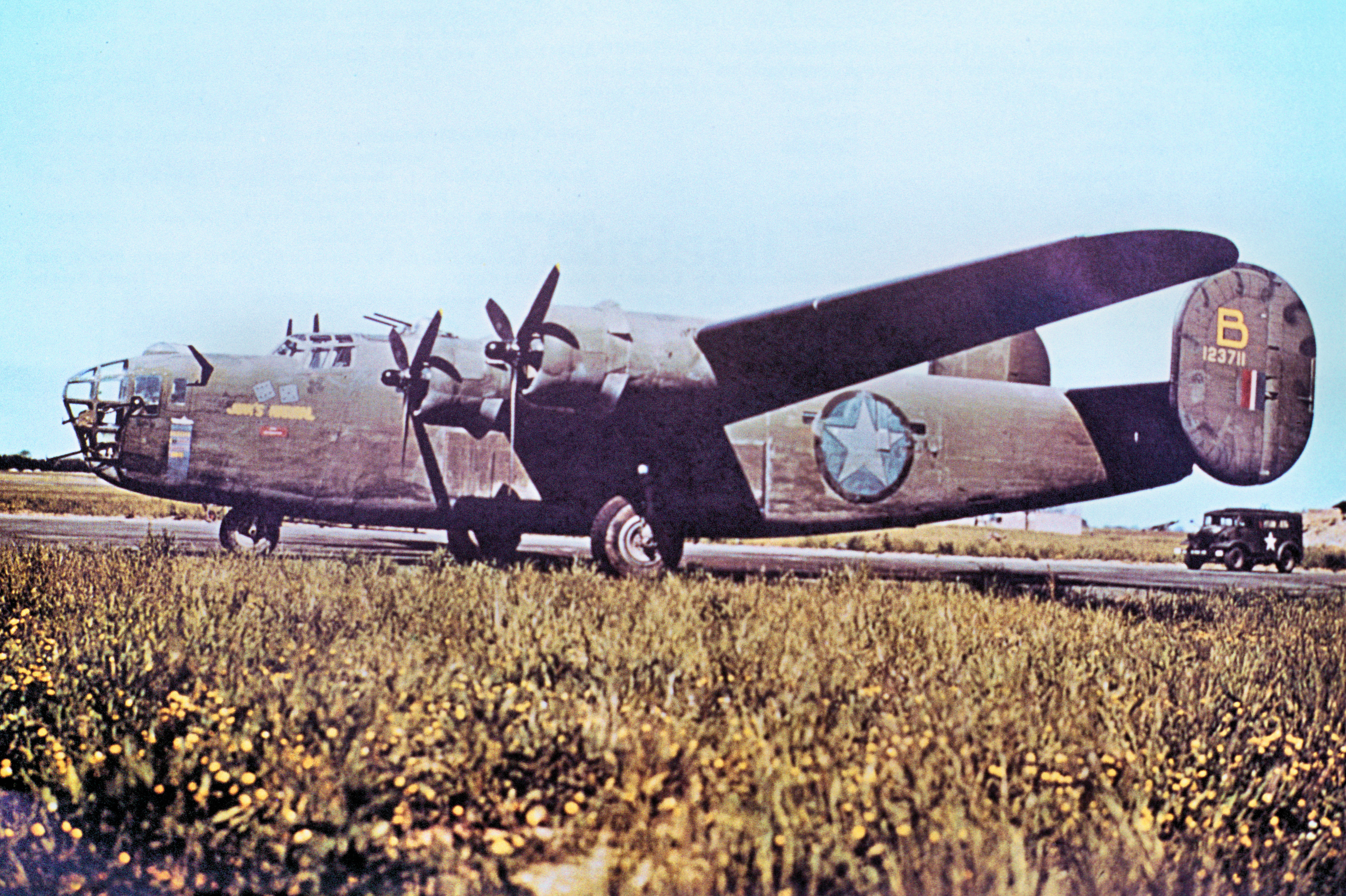
93d Bomb Group B-24D "Jersey Bounce" in 1942

During World War II the title was popular as a nickname for aircraft. One of the first examples was a B-24D Liberator that served in the Eighth Air Force with the 93rd Bomb Group at Alconbury, England, in 1942 and 1943. It was the name of two B-17 Flying Fortress bombers in the 303rd Bomb Group stationed at Molesworth, England. After it was taken out of commission, the "Jersey Bounce 2" replaced it. At least four other Bombardment Groups had B-17 bombers named "Jersey Bounce". Assigned to the 91st Bomb Group, 324th Squadron (DF-H) at Bassingbourn, England, another B-17F (4124515) was named "Jersey Bounce", by pilot, Lt. Phillip Fischer, when the bomber was assigned to him in September 1942.

Another example was from the 336th Fighter Squadron of the 4th Fighter Group, where Lt. Col. Donald F. Pierini named all three of his P-51 (B, C, &D) fighters "Jersey Bounce". "Jersey Bounce I" was destroyed in a mid-air collision in 1944. "Jersey Bounce II" was retired after a number of missions. "Jersey Bounce III" was shot down in 1945 but under a different pilot.

After World War II USS New Jersey received an HO3S-1 Dragonfly that was nicknamed "Jersey Bounce" by her crew.

== Lyrics ==
External audio
- You may hear "Jersey Bounce" performed by Shep Fields and his New Music Orchestra in 1942; Here on Archive.org

The lyrics begin:

They call it the Jersey Bounce
A rhythm that really counts
The temperature always mounts
Whenever they play the funny rhythm they play

It started on Journal Square
And Somebody heard it there
They put it right on the air
And now you'll hear it everywhere...
