= Alec Seward =

American singer

- Also known as: Slim Seward; Guitar Slim; Blues Servant Boy; King Blues; Georgia Slim; Duke Bayou
- Born: Alexander T. Seward; March 16, 1901; Charles City County, Virginia, United States
- Died: May 11, 1972 (aged 71) New York, United States
- Genres: Country blues, Piedmont blues
- Occupations: Singer, guitarist, songwriter
- Instruments: Vocals, guitar
- Years active: 1924–1972
- Label: Various

Alec Seward (born Alexander T. Seward, March 16, 1901 – May 11, 1972) was an American Piedmont blues and country blues singer, guitarist and songwriter. Some of his records were released under pseudonyms, such as Guitar Slim, Blues Servant Boy, King Blues and Georgia Slim. His best-remembered recordings are "Creepin' Blues" and "Some People Say".

== Biography ==
Seward, one of fourteen siblings, was born in Charles City County, Virginia. Like Gabriel Brown, Ralph Willis and Brownie McGhee, he relocated from the South to New York, in his case in 1924.

Seward befriended Brownie McGhee and Sonny Terry and retained his Piedmont blues styling despite changes in musical trends. He and the blues musician Louis Hayes (who later became a minister in northern New Jersey) performed together, variously billed as the Blues Servant Boys, Guitar Slim and Jelly Belly, and the Back Porch Boys. During the 1940s and 1950s Seward played and recorded with Lead Belly, Woody Guthrie, McGhee and Terry. Around 1947 Seward, Guthrie, and Terry recorded several chain gang songs, including "Chain Gang Special", and some other older songs adapted to having chain gang themes. They were later released on the compilation album Best of the War Years.

Under his own name, Seward issued Creepin' Blues (1965, Bluesville), with harmonica accompaniment by Larry Johnson. Later in the decade Seward worked in concert and at folk blues festivals.

Seward died of natural causes in May 1972, at the age of 71, in New York City.

He is not to be confused with Eddie "Guitar Slim" Jones, Guitar Slim Jr., James "Guitar Slim" Stephenson or Norman "Guitar Slim" Green.

== Selected discography ==
- Creepin' Blues (1965, Bluesville)
- Late One Saturday Evening (1996, Blues Alliance)
- The Back Porch Boys (2002, Delmark)

== See also ==
- East Coast blues
- List of country blues musicians
