= I Dreamt I Dwelt in Harlem =

1941 release as an RCA Bluebird 78 single by Glenn Miller, B-11063-A.

1941 sheet music cover, Fowler Music, New York.

"I Dreamt I Dwelt in Harlem" is a 1941 jazz and pop song recorded by Glenn Miller and His Orchestra. The song was released as a 78 single on RCA Bluebird by Glenn Miller.

The Glenn Miller recording on RCA Bluebird Records reached no. 3 on the Billboard pop singles chart in 1941.

The title is an allusion to the 1843 song "I Dreamt I Dwelt in Marble Halls" from the opera The Bohemian Girl.

== Background ==
The music was written by composer and arranger Jerry Gray, Ben Smith, and Leonard Ware. The lyrics were written by Robert B. Wright, the pseudonym of Buddy Feyne, who also wrote the lyrics to "Tuxedo Junction". The instrumental was recorded on January 17, 1941 in the studio, but had been previously performed live during a November, 1940 NBC radio remote broadcast from the Cafe Rouge, Hotel Pennsylvania, in New York City. The instrumental features a trumpet solo by Billy May. The arrangement was by Jerry Gray. The band performed the song live for radio broadcast on November 4, 18, 20, 23, 1940 and on December 28, 1940. "I Dreamt I Dwelt in Harlem" was recorded a month before Duke Ellington recorded "Take the 'A' Train" on February 15, 1941.

The November 23, 1940 Saturday night live radio broadcast from the Cafe Rouge in Hotel Pennsylvania was introduced by announcer Alan Robinson: "Glenn Miller's finale this evening, something that he cooked up to fit in with his ideas about Lenox Avenue, "I Dreamt I Dwelt in Harlem'." In 1987, Lenox Avenue was co-named Malcolm X Boulevard.

The single, released as an RCA Bluebird A side 78, B-11063-A, reached number three on the Billboard Best Sellers charts on April 5, 1941, staying for five weeks on the charts. The B side was "A Stone's Throw from Heaven". The recording was also released as a 78 single in the UK in October, 1943 on His Master's Voice as B.D. 5817 featuring "Sun Valley Jump" as the B side.

The recording appeared on the 1989 compilation collection Glenn Miller: The Popular Recordings, 1938-1942, a career retrospective on Bluebird, RCA, and BMG as 9785-2-RB in a 3 CD and a 4 disc vinyl boxed set LP format released in the U.S., Europe, and Germany.

== Personnel ==
The personnel on the 1941 Glenn Miller studio recording were: Dale McMickle, Ray Anthony, John Best, Billy May (tp), Glenn Miller, Paul Tanner, Jimmy Priddy, Frank D'Annolfo (tb), Hal McIntyre, Wilbur Schwartz (cl, as), Ernie Caceres (as, bar), Tex Benneke, Al Klink (ts), Chummy McGregor (p), Jack Lathrop (g), Trigger Alpert (sb), and Maurice Purtill (dm).

== Other recordings ==
1941 sheet music for the Erskine Butterfield recording.

The song was also recorded by the Delta Rhythm Boys, Erskine Butterfield and His Blue Boys on Decca Records with vocals in the U.S. and on Brunswick in the UK, Kenny Graham, Herb Miller and His Orchestra, the Syd Lawrence Orchestra, and the King Sisters. The Delta Rhythm Boys also performed the song with the lyrics in a 1941 soundie or film short by Storyville Films directed by Robert R. Snody. Sheet music was released by Fowler Music in New York to accompany the Glenn Miller and Erskine Butterfield recordings. The Alan Glasscock Orchestra has performed the song live in concert in 2013.

== Album appearances ==
- The Complete Glenn Miller, Vol. 6 (1940-1941), Bluebird RCA, 1975
- Glenn Miller: The Popular Recordings (1938-1942), Bluebird RCA, 1989
- Glenn Miller: Reader's Digest: His Greatest Hits & Finest Performances, Reader's Digest Music, 1994
- Glenn Miller: Marvellous Miller Magic, Hallmark, 1995
- Glenn Miller: The 100 Greatest Titles, EMI Music Distribution, 2001

== Sources ==
- Flower, John (1972). Moonlight Serenade: A Bio-Discography of the Glenn Miller Civilian Band. New Rochelle, NY: Arlington House. ISBN 0-87000-161-2.
- Miller, Glenn (1943). Glenn Miller's Method for Orchestral Arranging. New York: Mutual Music Society. ASIN: B0007DMEDQ
- Simon, George Thomas (1980). Glenn Miller and His Orchestra. New York: Da Capo paperback. ISBN 0-306-80129-9.
- Simon, George Thomas (1971). Simon Says. New York: Galahad. ISBN 0-88365-001-0.
- Schuller, Gunther (1991). The Swing Era: The Development of Jazz, 1930–1945, Volume 2. New York: Oxford University Press. ISBN 0-19-507140-9.
