= Joe Davis (music publisher) =

- Born: Joseph M. Davis; October 6, 1896; New York City, United States
- Died: September 3, 1978 (aged 81) Richmond, Virginia, United States
- Genres: Jazz, R&B, pop
- Occupations: Producer, publisher, promoter

Joseph M. Davis (October 6, 1896 – September 3, 1978) was an American music producer, publisher and promoter in jazz, rhythm and blues and pop music.

== Life and career ==
Joe Davis was born in New York City. In the late 1910s and 1920s, he worked as a songwriter and singer who recorded for Columbia Records. In the mid-1920s, he had been responsible for placing dozens of blues and pop singers under his management with major and minor labels, while pursuing a radio and recording career as "Joe Davis, The Melody Man" and operating Triangle Music Publishing Co., which was founded in 1919 with the help of George F. Briegel (1890–1968).

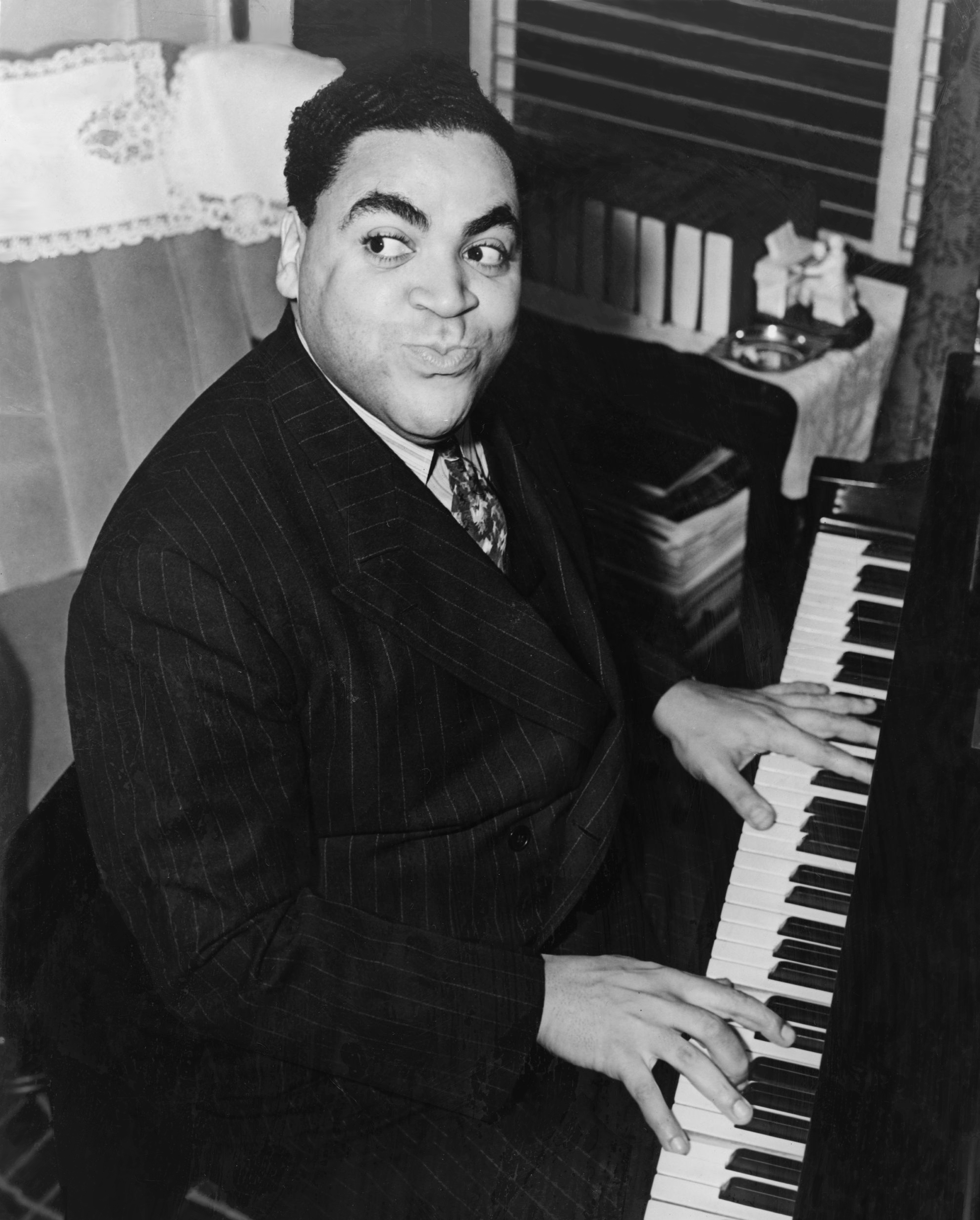
Fats Waller (1938)

He has to be considered as an important influence for Fats Waller, having actually talked the shy, reluctant Waller into considering a performing career. Davis pushed Waller to compose seriously for the piano (as "African Ripples" 1931). Davis' name was found as 'songwriter' of Waller songs such as "Alligator Crawl" (1927) and "Our Love Was Meant To Be", also the Andy Razaf titles "Alexander's Back in Town" and "After I've Spent My Best Years on You". Davis managed to cheat Razaf out of royalties to "S'posin'", which was written to Paul Denniker's music. As a publisher, Davis worked with Porter Grainger ("Wylie Avenue Blues", 1927), Howard Johnson ("Florida Flo"), Chris Smith, Alex Hill, Spencer Williams, Carson Robison, Tom Delaney, J. C. Johnson, and Claude Hopkins. Davis dropped the Triangle imprint in the 1930s and replaced it with Joe Davis, Inc. He sold the firm in 1939 and went into the record manufacturing business.

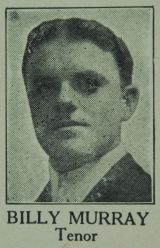
Billy Murray (1919)

In May 1942, Davis founded his first record label, Beacon Records. On Beacon, Davis published in 1943 and 1944 the music of Billy Murray/Monroe Silver (Casey and Cohen in the Army, 1943), Irving Kaufman with the Buddy Clark Orchestra, and local vocal ensembles as The Red Caps. In 1944, Davis purchased most of the short-lived Varsity label's hundreds of master records when they went bankrupt in the early 1940s, but had with Varsity a tiny shellac ration from which to press the records. Joe Davis then pressed token quantities of records by the State Street Ramblers (Jimmy Blythe), Thomas A. Dorsey (as Georgia Tom), and Bradley Kincaid, using Gennett and Champion masters, also reissues from the 1939-Varsity label by Harry James, Frank Trumbauer, Vincent Lopez, Sammy Kaye, or The Three Suns; with that tiny amount of shellac from which to press records.

In 1945, he founded the Joe Davis Record Company with the sub labels Beacon, Celebrity and (Joe) Davis Records. The Company was placed in 331 West 49th Street, with subsidiary in Richmond, Virginia.

Davis edited pop music, jazz, rhythm and blues, gospel and Latin music, by artists such as Coleman Hawkins ("On the Bean" 1945), the vocal ensemble Five Red Caps ("Just for You") and singer Una Mae Carlisle ("I'm a Good, Good Woman" 1945). Joe Davis was making use of her talents as a prolific songwriter and surrounding her once again with musicians including Ray Nance, Budd Johnson and Shadow Wilson ("Tain't Yours").

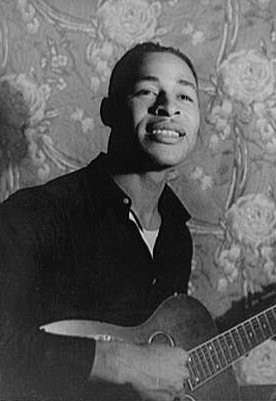
Gabriel Brown (1935)

Davis edited an album by Otis Blackwell and a compilation with the title World Famous Rhythm and Blues Groups. also in the 1950s on Davis Records swing and jazz recordings by Frank Signorelli, Erskine Butterfield, Lee Castle and Eddie Miller, under Joe Davis Records blues recordings by Walter Thomas, Champion Jack Dupree and Gabriel Brown.

Davis worked in the early 1950s for MGM Records and founded the label Jay-Dee in spring 1953; he edited re-issues from The Crickets with the lead singer (Grover) Dean Barlowe, recordings by doo-wop ensembles as The Mellows, with the lead singer Lillian Leach and The Blenders ("Don't Play Around With Love", 1953), the latter song being also recorded with the 'blue' alternate take ("Don't Fuck Around With Love" 780-45 (1953) reissued 1973). The Mellows recorded several songs for Jay-Dee, including "How Sentimental Can I Be" in August 1954, "Smoke From Your Cigarette" in January 1955, and "I Still Care," issued in April 1955 and probably the high point of their career. In 1956 Davis also recorded The Chestnuts ("Love Is True").

In 1954, Davis reactivated his Beacon label for re-issues of R&B-recordings. He edited recordings of Dean Barlow & The Crickets and The Deep River Boys. In 1961, Davis also recorded on his Beacon label a session of jazz pianist Elmo Hope, but at this time mostly party music. In the 1960s, he led Beacon and Celebrity as his two publishing companies.

== Private life ==
Joe Davis was married to Bertha Kapp (née Bertha Kapp or Kaplatsky; 1903–1973) and a brother-in-law of Jack (1901–1949) and Dave Kapp (1904–1976).

Davis died on 3 September 1978 in Louisville, Kentucky.

== Music productions (selected) ==
- 1952: R & B Groups From Joe Davis (with Eddie Carter Quartet, The Crickets, The Bleners, The Five Barons)
- 1956: Otis Blackwell – Singin’ the Blues (Joe Davis LP 12": JD 109)
- 1961: Elmo Hope – High Hope (Beacon LP 12": LP/BS 401)
- 1962: Elmo Hope – Here's Hope (Celebrity LP 12": 209)
