= Errata, Mississippi =

- Unincorporated community
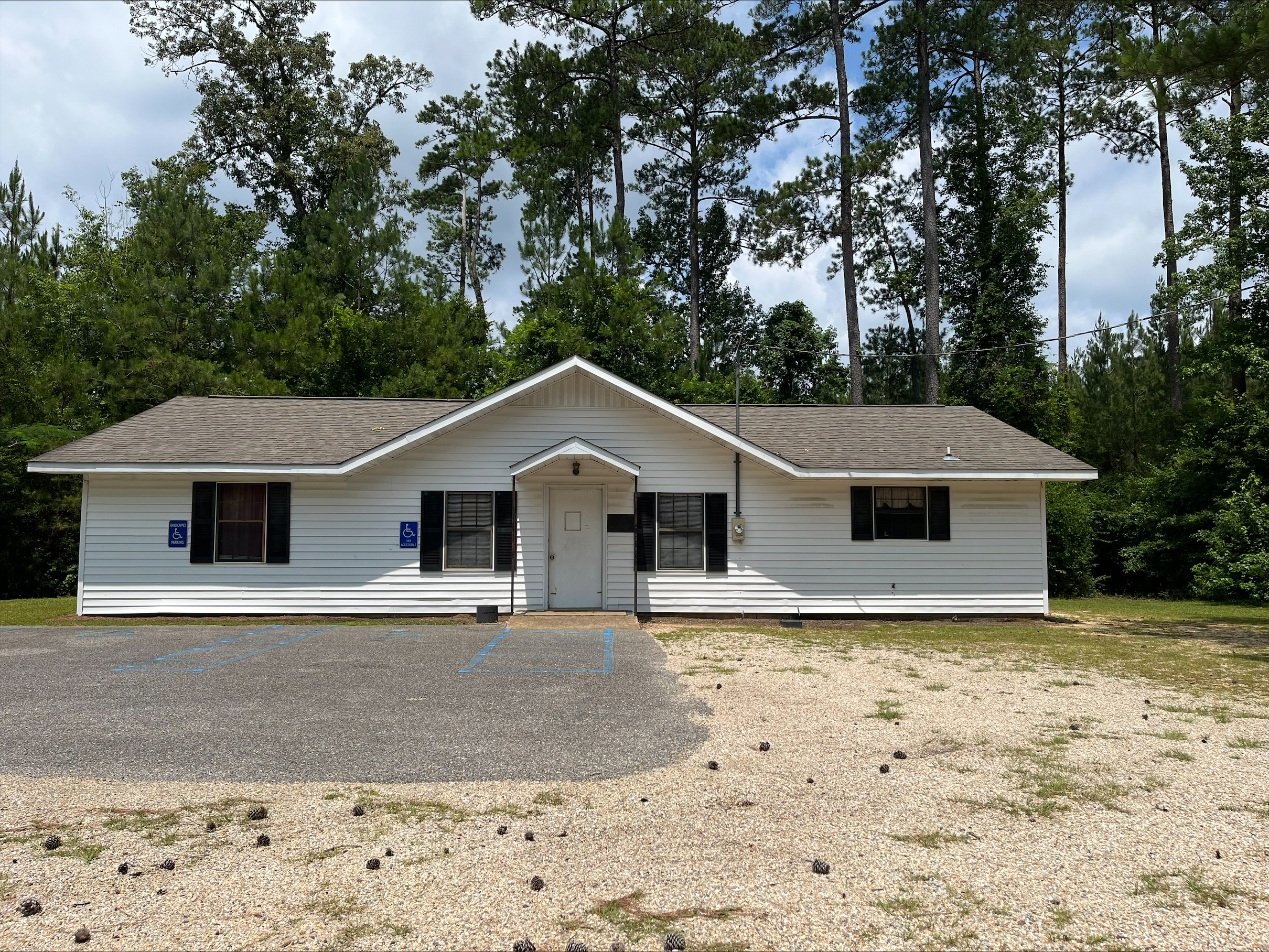
- Errata Community Center

- Location within Mississippi Location within the United States
- Coordinates: 31°45′32″N 89°03′36″W
- Country: United States
- State: Mississippi
- County: Jones
- Elevation: 308 ft (94 m)
- Time zone: UTC-6 (Central (CST))
  - Summer (DST): UTC-5 (CDT)
- Area codes: 601 & 769
- GNIS feature ID: 691557

Errata (also spelled Erata) is an unincorporated community in Jones County, Mississippi. Errata is located on U.S. Route 11 2.5 miles (4.0 km) southwest of Sandersville.

Errata is located on the Norfolk Southern Railway and was once home to nine different sawmills and a grocery store.

Albennie Jones, a blues and jazz singer who recorded in the mid and late 1940s, was born in Errata.
