= Buddy Feyne =

American songwriter (1912–1998)

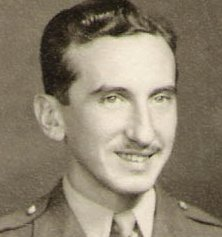
- Buddy Feyne in 1946

Background information
- Born: Bernard Feinstein; June 9, 1912; New York City, U.S.
- Died: December 10, 1998 (aged 86) Los Angeles, California, U.S.
- Genres: Jazz
- Occupation: Lyricist
- Years active: 1930s–1980s

Buddy Feyne (born Bernard Feinstein; June 9, 1912 – December 10, 1998) was an American lyricist during the swing era. He wrote the lyrics for "Tuxedo Junction", which went to No. 1 on the Billboard chart in 1940 when Glenn Miller recorded it, "Jersey Bounce", which was No. 15 on the Cash Box Hit Parade of 1942., and "Jumpin' with Symphony Sid".

Feyne's songs have been recorded by Ella Fitzgerald, Joe Jackson, The Manhattan Transfer, Sarah Vaughan, Joe Williams, Louis Armstrong, Gene Autry, Frankie Avalon, The Andrews Sisters, George Benson, Nat King Cole, and Boz Scaggs.

== Life and career ==
Feyne was born in New York City, the youngest son of immigrants Solomon and Sarah Feinstein. His older brother, Irving, befriended Milton Berle, who advised Bernard that a Jewish name would prevent him from succeeding in the music industry, and summarily changed his name to Buddy Feyne.

Feyne was based at the Brill Building in New York, writing songs for Lewis Music Publishers, one of the few companies which published "race music", the term for songs created by black artists. In 1939, Erskine Hawkins and his band introduced "Tuxedo Junction" at the Savoy Ballroom, in New York, which was an immediate hit.

When it was decided to add words to the music, the publisher asked several different lyricists to propose words for the tune. Feyne met Hawkins and asked what the name referred to. It was named for a whistle stop spot on the "Chitlin' Circuit" in Alabama. When he learned the meaning of the song, the lyrics came easily, and his were selected. Glenn Miller recorded the most successful version, reaching #1 on the Billboard charts in 1940, selling 115,000 in the first week of release. The song was also recorded by the Andrews Sisters, Duke Ellington, Jan Savitt, and other orchestras. Later it became the theme song of The Manhattan Transfer, who met Feyne in 1978. Feyne played the original piano solo for them from the Miller Band and they changed their arrangement to match the original. They maintained a close friendship for the last twenty years of Feyne's life.

Feyne continued to write lyrics for black composers such as Erskine Hawkins, Bill Johnson, Dud Bascomb, Bobby Plater, Tiny Bradshaw, and Edward Johnson. "Dolimite" by the Hawkins band on the Bluebird label was recorded by Jimmy Dorsey for Decca (1940). Feyne became a member of the American Society of Composers, Authors and Publishers (ASCAP) in 1940. He used the nom de plume "Robert B. Wright" when he penned the lyrics for "After Hours", a haunting blues piece composed by Avery Parrish. "Jersey Bounce" followed soon after. He wrote the lyrics to the Glenn Miller #3 Billboard chart hit "I Dreamt I Dwelt in Harlem" in 1941, with music by Jerry Gray. He wrote with many other composers, sang on the radio, and was a writer-producer of the series "Rhythm School of the Air".

Drafted in World War II, while in training at Fort Pickett in Virginia, Buddy continued to write songs and sang his tune "Your Soldier Boy" on Armed Forces Radio, recorded on the base. He served in the Pacific in the 77th Infantry Division and was awarded the Bronze Star Medal and the Purple Heart. As his regiment was too far forward for the USO to reach he also wrote, conducted, and performed in Army shows in the Philippines.

After the war, Buddy collaborated on several musicals with Harry Revel, Bill Harrington, and Bill Baker; wrote and produced for television; and composed Time for Fun, an album of children's songs.

In 1954, Feyne collaborated with Maurice Shapiro on "Why", recorded by Nat King Cole and Karen Chandler.

In the 1960s, he teamed with Denny McReynolds, writing a series of swing ballads. He also wrote with Joe Williams, who recorded their song "Everybody Wants to be Loved" and performed it on The Joey Bishop Show. Next he teamed with Bill Baker, writing numerous songs, albums, scoring films, Diary of a Stewardess and Dead End Dolls, and also the show, Up Your Alley. Producer Harry Delmar worked with Feyne on producing Up Your Alley. In addition to songs, he also wrote special material for The Ed Sullivan Tribute at the Lambs Club.

Over his life, Feyne wrote more than 400 songs. Co-writers included Milton Berle, Harry Revel, Bill Harrington, Raymond Scott, Stan Worth, Al Sherman, Ken Carson, Bill Baker, Joe Williams, and Peter Tinturin.

Artists who recorded Feyne's songs included: Cab Calloway, Lester Young, Erskine Hawkins, Gene Autry, Henry Mancini, Red Norvo, Bob Crosby, Benny Goodman, Glenn Miller, BBC Dance Band, Kay Kyser, Ozzie Nelson, Teddy Powell, Alvino Rey, Joe Williams, The King Sisters, Gene Krupa, Frankie Avalon, Ella Fitzgerald, Joe Jackson, LA Jazz Choir, The Manhattan Transfer, and Nat King Cole.

Buddy Feyne died in Canoga Park, Los Angeles in 1998, at the age of 86.

== Hit compositions ==
Songs

- "Tuxedo Junction"
- "I Dreamt I Dwelt in Harlem"
- "Jersey Bounce"
- "After Hours"
- "Why" (recorded by Nat King Cole)
- "Jumpin' With Symphony Sid"
- "Dolomite" (a.k.a. "Dolemite")
- "Radar Blues"
- "The Shadow Knows"
- "Everybody Wants to Be Loved"

Musicals:

- Song of Texas (composer Harry Revel)
- So This is Brooklyn (composer Bill Harrington)
- Up Your Alley (composer Bill Baker)

Films with Buddy Feyne Songs:

- George Hall & His Orchestra (1936)
- It's In the Stars (1938)
- The Zoot Cat (1944)
- Junior Miss (1945)
- Sweet Serenade (1950)
- Night Stage to Galveston (1952)
- The Glenn Miller Story (1954)
- The Benny Goodman Story (1956)
- The Gene Krupa Story (1959)
- Carnal Knowledge (1971)
- Diary of a Stewardess (1972)
- Dona Flor and Her Two Husbands (1976)
- The Electric Horseman (1979)
- Raging Bull (1980)
- Raggedy Man (1981)
- Sharky's Machine (1981)
- Dead End Dolls (1983)
- House (1986)
- Radio Days (1987)
- Miss Rose White (1992)
- A Midnight Clear (1992)
- Boiling Point (1993)
- Theremin: An Electronic Odyssey (1993)
- Murder in the First (1995)
- Contact (1997)
- Rounders (1998)
- Transistorized (2000)
- My Dog Skip (2000)
- The Curse of the Jade Scorpion (2001)
- Out of Step (2001)
- Starsky & Hutch (2004)
- The Machinist (2004)
- Australia (2008)
