= Albinia gens =

Ancient Roman family

The gens Albinia was a plebeian family at Rome during the early centuries of the Republic. The first member of this gens to achieve prominence was Lucius Albinius Paterculus, one of the first men to hold the office of tribune of the plebs, after it was created in 494 BC.

== Origin ==
The nomen Albinia is probably derived from the cognomen Albinus, a lengthened form of Albus, meaning "white" or "whitish".

== Praenomina ==
The Albinii are known to have used the praenomina Lucius, Gaius, and Marcus.

== Branches and cognomina ==
The only cognomen associated with the Albinii is Paterculus, a diminutive of pater, which may be translated as "little father", "uncle", or "daddy".

== Members ==
This list includes abbreviated praenomina. For an explanation of this practice, see filiation.

- Gaius Albinius, father of the tribune of 494 BC.
- Lucius Albinius C. f. Paterculus, tribune of the plebs in 494 BC.
- Lucius Albinius, helped carry the priests and Vestals from Rome to Caere before the Gallic sack of Rome in 390 BC.
- Marcus Albinius, military tribune with consular power in 379 BC.

== See also ==
- List of Roman gentes
