= Albennie Jones =

American singer

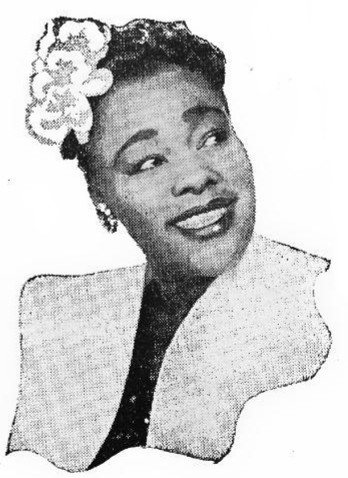

Background information
- Also known as: Albinia Jones
- Born: November 29, 1914; Errata, Mississippi, United States
- Died: June 24, 1989 (aged 74) The Bronx, New York City, US
- Genres: Blues, jazz, R&B
- Occupation: Singer
- Years active: 1930s – early 1950s
- Labels: National, Decca

Albennie Jones (November 29, 1914 – June 24, 1989), also credited as Albinia Jones, was an American blues and jazz singer who recorded in the mid and late 1940s.

== Biography ==
She was born in Errata, Mississippi. She grew up in Gulfport where she sang in the Mount Holy Baptist Church, before moving to New York City in 1932. Her first professional engagement as a singer was at Elk's Rendezvous Club, where she was so successful that she was retained for nine months. She also sang in other clubs, including the Club Harlem, the Village Vanguard and Murrains Café.

She first recorded, as Albinia Jones, for National Records in late 1944, with a band that included electric guitarist Leonard Ware and pianist Cliff Jackson. The following year, her accompanists also included trumpeter Dizzy Gillespie, saxophonist Don Byas and pianist Sammy Price. She was promoted at the time as the "New Queen of the Blues", and toured widely with Blanche Calloway, Eddie "Cleanhead" Vinson, Tiny Bradshaw and the Erskine Hawkins Orchestra. As Albennie Jones, she recorded again with Price for Decca Records in 1947 and 1949. One of her last recordings with Price in February 1949 was a rocking R&B number, "Hole in the Wall", co-written by record producer Milt Gabler and featuring the line "we're going to rock and roll at the Hole in the Wall tonight", a notably early use of the phrase.

Following an onstage fall in the early 1950s, she had to use a crutch at her club performances, and shortly afterwards retired from the music business. She later suffered from leukaemia. She died in The Bronx, New York City, in 1989, at the age of 74.
