= Albinia (1813 ship) =

British ship (1813-1842)

History

United Kingdom
- Name: Albinia
- Builder: William Smith & Co., Newcastle-upon-Tyne
- Launched: 25 March 1813
- Fate: Foundered 25 March 1842

General characteristics
- Tons burthen: 41559/94, or 427, or 42731/94, or 430 (bm)
- Armament: 8 × 18-pounder carronades

Albinia was launched at Newcastle-upon-Tyne in 1813. She initially sailed several times to India under a license from the British East India Company (EIC). One of her voyages brought her master into conflict with the Post Office. She then sailed primarily between London and Demerara. She foundered on 25 March 1842 off the coast of Ireland.

== Career ==
Albinia first appeared in Lloyd's Register (LR) in 1813, but with information on her origins (Sunderland) and burthen (370 tons) that later volumes corrected.

Year	Master	Owner	Trade	Source
1813	Weatherall	Clay & Co.	London transport	LR

In 1813 the EIC had lost its monopoly on the trade between India and Britain. British ships were then free to sail to India or the Indian Ocean under a license from the EIC. Albinia was reported to have been at Point de Galle on 16 January 1814, though probably in the capacity of a Government transport. On 5 June 1814 Albinia Weatherall, master, arrived at Gravesend from Ceylon.

Albinia's owners applied for a licence on 17 October 1814 and received the licence the next day.

Then on 5 November Albinia, Weatherall, master sailed for the Cape of Good Hope (the Cape) and Batavia as a licensed ship. On 11 December 1816 she was back at Portsmouth, having sailed from Java on 16 July and from the Cape on 18 September.

Year	Master	Owner	Trade	Source
1816	Weatherall	Clay & Co.	London–India	LR
1818	Norton; Lynn	Clay & Co.	London–Île de France	LR

The Ship Letter Act (1814) did not mandate that the EIC take Post Office mail to India, and the Company instructed its captains not to take any bag of mail that carried letters subject to a rate of postage for carriage by ship. A new Act, in the next Parliamentary session in 1815, clarified matters. It authorized the Post Office to establish a packet service to the Cape of Good Hope and India, and until it did, to have the authority to require any vessel, including naval vessels, going to these destinations to carry the mails. The Act provided for a monthly service, and a rate of postage. The Act also included a provision for paying the carrying vessel a sum for the service.

Captain Robert Wetherall, Albinia's master, was one of the first captains, if not the very first, to come into conflict with the Post Office over the requirement to carry mails. At the last moment, shortly before leaving Gravesend, Wetherall refused to accept 178 pieces of mail for the Cape. The Post Office's law officers wanted to indict Wetherall. The Government decided to "proceed by information". The Government thought that by proceeding in that manner, it would give the case "greater importance and notoriety."

Year	Master	Owner	Trade	Source
1821	Lynn; Shadford	Clay & Co.	London–India; London–Demerara	LR
1824	Shadforth	Clay & Co.	London–Demerara	LR

On 18 February 1823 Albinia, Shadforth, lost her bowsprit and foretopmast in Sea Breach and remained at Gravesend.

Year	Master	Owner	Trade	Source
1827	Shadforth; Vowles	Clay & Co.	London–Demerara	LR
1829	Vowles; Purvis	Clay & Co. Hall & Co.	London–Demerara	LR
1835	Purvis	Hall & Co.	London–Demerara	LR

Albinia, Rind, master, ran aground on 24 September 1838 on the Kent Sand, in the Bay of Fundy. She was on a voyage from Demerara to St. Andrews, New Brunswick, British North America. Albinia was later refloated. Afterward, Hebe. of St Andrews, ran into her, costing Albinia her royal mast and some rigging.

Year	Master	Owner	Trade	Source & notes
1840	Kind		London–Demerara	LR; damages repaired 1836 & 1839

== Fate ==
Albinia, of 430 tons (bm), Logic, master, was lost on 25 March 1842. She was carrying 600 tons of coal from Newcastle to Jamaica when a gale disabled her 50 nautical miles (93 km) miles north west of Tory Island. Two crew members drowned and the 15 survivors took to a small boat. Two days later they safely reached "Ballyherman strand", Donegal. The mate and one seaman drowned, the mate because he would not get into the boat, judging it too small. The survivors reached Ballyheirnan Bay, about three miles west of the Fannet Lighthouse.

The volume of LR for 1841 carries the annotation "Foundered" by her name.
