= A Little More Faith =

Studio album by Reverend Gary Davis
- Released: September 1961
- Recorded: August 10, 1961
- Studios: Van Gelder Studio, Englewood Cliffs, NJ
- Genre: Blues
- Length: 44:41
- Labels: Bluesville; BVLP 1032
- Producer: Kenneth S. Goldstein

Reverend Gary Davis chronology
Harlem Street Singer (1961)	A Little More Faith (1961)	Say No to the Devil (1961)

A Little More Faith is an album by the blues musician Reverend Gary Davis released on the Bluesville label in September 1961.

== Reception ==
Professional ratings
Review scores
Source	Rating
AllMusic	4.5/5 stars
The Penguin Guide to Blues Recordings	4/4 stars

AllMusic reviewer Bruce Eder stated: "it's a masterpiece: its dozen songs recorded on one day in August of 1961 are nothing less than priceless. Davis presents an easy virtuosity on his solo guitar, and runs his voice across a surprisingly wide range in what is mostly gospel repertory. Not that any blues fans will mind his approach: Davis was one of those figures where the sound and feel of blues becomes indistinguishable from those of gospel. He was just doing what came naturally on this record, laying down 12 songs he knew well from across decades of performing".

== Track listing ==
All compositions by Gary Davis except where noted

1. "You Got to Move" (Traditional) – 3:19
2. "Crucifixion" – 4:57
3. "I'm Glad I'm in That Number" – 2:58
4. "There's a Table Sittin' in Heaven" – 3:28
5. "Motherless Children" (Traditional) – 4:12
6. "There's a Bright Side Somewhere" (Traditional) – 3:12
7. "I'll Be All Right Some Day" – 3:03
8. "You Better Mind" – 3:26
9. "A Little More Faith" – 3:40
10. "I'll Fly Away" (Albert E. Brumley) – 4:32
11. "God's Gonna Separate" (Traditional) – 3:35
12. "When I Die I'll Live Again" – 3:28

== Personnel ==
=== Performance ===
- Blind Gary Davis – guitar, vocals

=== Production ===
- Kenneth S. Goldstein – supervision
- Rudy Van Gelder – engineer
