= Becoming Steve Jobs =

2015 biography of Steve Jobs by Brent Schlender and Rick Tetzeli

- First edition
- Author: Brent Schlender; Rick Tetzeli
- Cover artist: Doug Menuez
- Language: English
- Genre: Biography
- Publisher: Crown Business
- Publication date: March 24, 2015
- Publication place: United States
- Media type: E-book, Print (Hardback and Paperback), and Audiobook
- Pages: 464 pp.
- ISBN: 978-0-385-34740-2

Becoming Steve Jobs: The Evolution of a Reckless Upstart into a Visionary Leader by journalists Brent Schlender and Rick Tetzeli, is an unauthorized biography of Steve Jobs. Rick Tetzeli is Executive Editor of Fast Company and Brent Schlender is a writer, editor, and author, best known for his award-winning magazine profiles of prominent entrepreneurs and business leaders of the Digital Revolution. The book was released on 24 March 2015 by Crown Business in the US.

Apple spokesman Steve Dowling admitted that Apple helped the authors in writing the book, as the company felt it could do more for its founder. In addition, Tim Cook was not happy with Walter Isaacson's official biography, Steve Jobs. Reviews from Apple Inc. for Becoming Steve Jobs have been positive, with Bill Atkinson describing it as "the best accounting of Jobs ... it did a really good job of showing the arc of Steve's career".

The book is noted for revealing previous publicly unknown events from Jobs' life, such as when in 2009, Tim Cook offered a portion of his liver to Jobs, since both share a rare blood type. Jobs responded by yelling, "I'll never let you do that. I'll never do that."

The front cover uses a photographic portrait of Jobs from the book Fearless Genius: The Digital Revolution in Silicon Valley 1985-2000 by Doug Menuez. The photograph was taken by Doug Menuez.
