= Say No to the Devil =

Studio album by Reverend Gary Davis
- Released: August 1962
- Recorded: 1961
- Studio: Van Gelder Studio, Englewood Cliffs, NJ
- Genre: Blues
- Length: 42:30
- Label: Bluesville; BVLP 1049
- Producer: Kenneth S. Goldstein

Reverend Gary Davis chronology
A Little More Faith (1961)	Say No to the Devil (1962)	The Guitar & Banjo of Reverend Gary Davis (1964)

Say No to the Devil is an album by blues musician Reverend Gary Davis recorded in 1961 and released on the Bluesville label in August 1962.

== Reception ==
Professional ratings
Review scores
Source	Rating
AllMusic	4.5/5 stars
The Penguin Guide to Blues Recordings	4/4 stars

AllMusic reviewer Bruce Eder stated: "The repertory here is perhaps a little more traditional gospel in orientation, and the songs more cautionary in nature – but that doesn't stop Davis from displaying some overpowering dexterity, and if anything his singing is even more exuberant here. And this time out, in addition to his six-string guitar, he treats us to his powerful 12-string playing ... the result is an album as fine as its predecessor, and an equally worthy part of any serious acoustic blues collection".

== Track listing ==
All compositions by Gary Davis except where noted

1. "Say No to the Devil" – 4:01
2. "Time Is Drawing Near" – 4:26
3. "Hold on to God's Unchanging Hand" (Traditional) – 4:35
4. "Bad Company Brought Me Here" – 3:38
5. "I Decided to Go Down" – 4:25
6. "Lord, I Looked Down the Road" – 4:20
7. "Little Bitty Baby" (Traditional) – 4:32
8. "No One Can Do Me Like Jesus" – 3:40
9. "Lost Boy in the Wilderness" – 5:01
10. "Tryin' to Get to Heaven in Due Time" – 4:24

== Personnel ==
=== Performance ===
- Blind Gary Davis – guitar, 12 string guitar, harmonica, vocals

=== Production ===
- Kenneth S. Goldstein – supervision
- Rudy Van Gelder – engineer
