= Doug Menuez =

American photographer (born 1957)

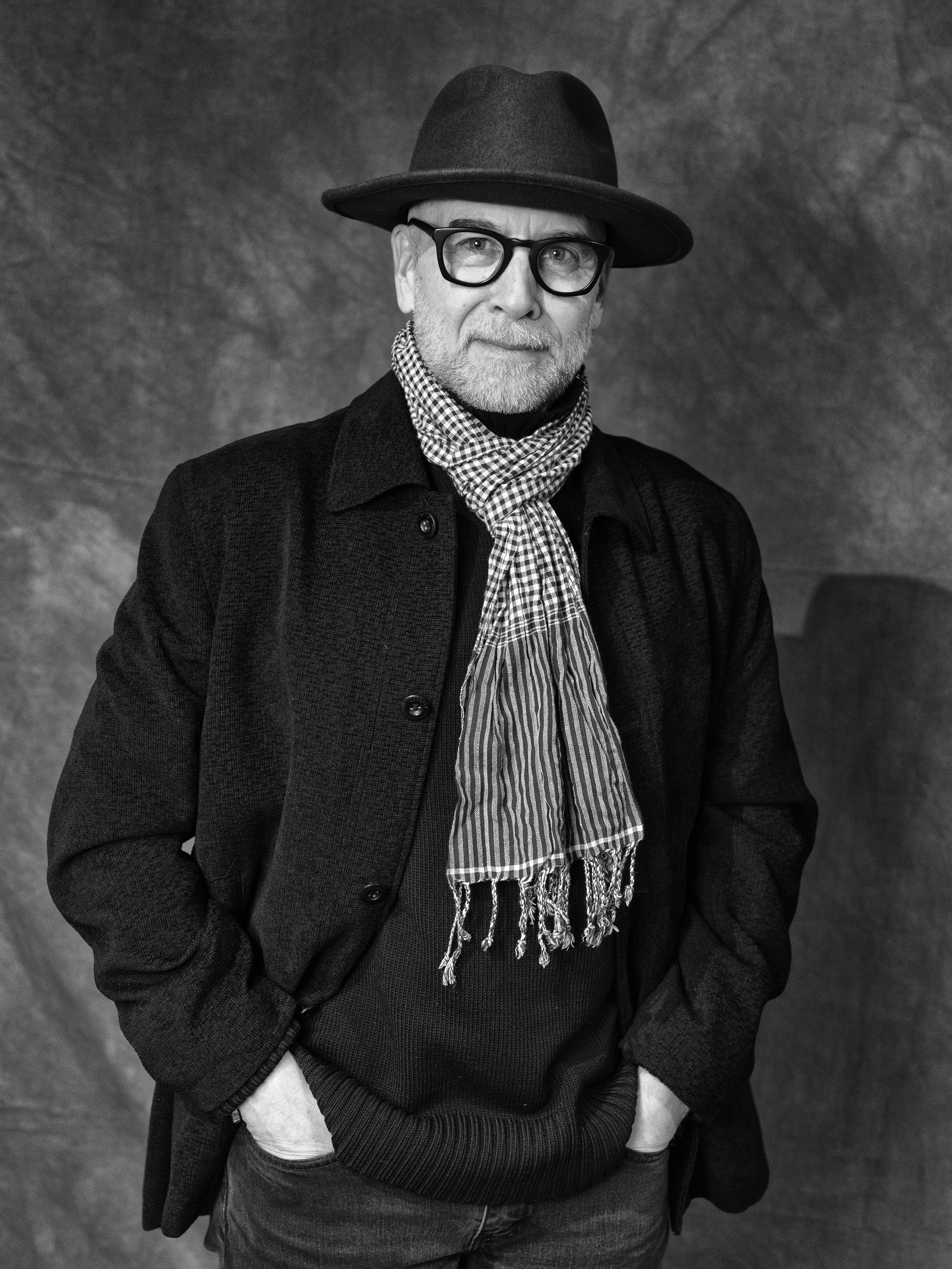
Doug Menuez in New York City (2019)

Doug Menuez (born 1957) is an American photographer. His career encompasses photojournalism, documentary, commercial, and commissioned photography. He has traveled to the North Pole, the Amazon, Vietnam, Africa, Dubai, Japan, and other regions of the world.

“I know how to tell a story, but there's a deeper thing I'm trying to get to now that can't be expressed with a caption.”

== Biography ==
Menuez was born in Texas. His father moved the family to the south side of Chicago to work for the community organizer, Saul Alinsky. They moved, again, to Long Island where his father continued working as an organizer. His mother counseled conscientious objectors to the Vietnam War.

As a teenager, Menuez played in a blues band with his friend Seth Fahey and other local boys. In March 1972, while a ninth-grader at Northport Junior High School, the 14-year-old Menuez and Fahey reached out to the gospel blues singer-guitarist Blind Gary Davis, then ill and nearing the end of his life, to perform at their local First Presbyterian Church in Northport, Long Island. Menuez printed the concert tickets in his woodshop class, while Fahey's mother, a painter, silkscreened posters for the boys to put up on telephone polls in the town, as well as around the nearby Huntington and local colleges. On April 24, the boys welcome Davis to Northport and escorted him to play the church's basement, where he opened with a fierce rendition of his popular song "Death Don't Have No Mercy" and finished the show to immense applause from a sold-out crowd of more than 250 people.

Menuez studied art and photography at the San Francisco Art Institute and San Francisco State University, graduating from SFSU with a bachelor's degree in photojournalism. He worked as a photojournalist from 1979 to the middle of the 1990s. From then, until 2004, he managed his own commercial photography studio in the San Francisco Bay Area. In 2004, he moved to New York with his wife and son. He is represented by Stockland Martel.

== Photojournalism ==
Upon graduating from SFSU in 1981, Menuez began an internship at The Washington Post. From then, until 1994, he accepted editorial assignments for magazines and newspapers, including: Time, Newsweek, Life magazine, and others. These assignments included the 1984-85 Ethiopian famine, the Olympics, the Amazon, the World Series, presidential campaigns, Silicon Valley, the AIDS crisis and other events.

== Silicon Valley ==
From 1986 to 1988, Doug Menuez documented Steve Jobs’ new company NeXT Inc. and its development and launch of the computer NeXT Computer for Life magazine. At Apple Computer, Doug Menuez documented various projects, including the Apple Newton from its early stages in 1992 to its launch in 1993. In 1992, Menuez published, with Markos Kounalakis, the book, Defying Gravity: The Making of Newton.

Between 1988 and 1995, Menuez documented the corporate life and the early development of PDF, and the development of Adobe Photoshop at Adobe Systems San Jose, California.

The 250,000 photographs Menuez shot, documenting Silicon Valley from 1986 to 2000, are now archived in the Douglas Menuez Photography Collection at Stanford University Library.

== Books ==
Heaven, Earth, Tequila: Un Viaje al Corazón de Mexico is a portrait of Mexican culture through the traditions of growing, producing, and drinking Tequila in the Jalisco region, as told by Menuez in black and white and color photographs.

In 2007, Menuez visited sub-Saharan Africa to photograph the Children of Uganda, a 22-member dance troupe comprising children and young adults, orphaned by AIDS and civil war. Published in 2008, with an introduction by Dame Elizabeth Taylor, Transcendent Spirit: The Orphans of Uganda is a photo-essay of the East African dance troupe.

Doug Menuez was a contributor to nine of the Day in the Life series of books. As one of one hundred photojournalists, Menuez visited Africa in 2002 to shoot for the book, A Day in the Life of Africa. Menuez's portrait of a member of the famously camera-shy Maasai tribe of Tanzania is on the cover.

In the mid-1990s, Menuez took on commercial work with several global brands. In 2008, the airline Emirates commissioned him to document the culture and the region of Dubai.

Menuez built a relationship with Nikon founded on his first camera, the Nikkormat and its 50mm lens. He developed a professional relationship with Nikon to test their equipment. In 2008 they worked together, traveling in Vietnam to test the D700.

== Published works ==
- :15: Fifteen Seconds: The Great California Earthquake of 1989. David Elliot Cohen; Douglas Menuez and Ron Tussy, Editors. 119 p., [1] p. : ill. The Tides Foundation, San Francisco, 1989. ISBN 1559630418
- Defying Gravity: The Making of Newton. Photographs by Doug Menuez; introduction by Paul Saffo; text by Marcos Kounalakis. 176 p. : ill. Beyond Words, Hillsboro (OR), 1993. ISBN 0941831949
- A Day in the Life of Africa. David Elliot Cohen, Susan Wels and Lee Lieberman Foreword by Archbishop Desmond Tutu. 288 p. : ill., maps. Tides Foundation, San Francisco, 2002. ISBN 0971802106
- Heaven, Earth, Tequila: un viaje al corazón de México. Photographs by Douglas Menuez; introduction by Victor Villaseñor; text by Doug Menuez with Andrés Zamudio. 141, [6] p. : ill. Waterside Press, Cardiff-by-the-Sea (CA), 2005. ISBN 0976680106
- Transcendent Spirit: The Orphans of Uganda. Photographs by Douglas Menuez; introduction by Dame Elizabeth Taylor; text by Rachel Scheier. 151 p. : ill. Beaufort Books, New York, 2008. ISBN 9780825305856
- Fearless Genius: The Digital Revolution in Silicon Valley 1985-2000. Simon and Schuster. 3 June 2014. ISBN 978-1-4767-5273-0.

=== Selected artist's books ===
- Drag Meet: 1996. Sears Point Race Track, California. Amateur drag racers. Offset printing, edition of 500.
- Facetime. 2006, Woodstock (NY). Various portraits, including: Robert Redford, Francis Ford Coppola, Bob Weir, Sonia Braga, Martin Cruz Smith, Delroy Lindo, Natasha Richardson, and others. Indigo printing, edition of 100.
- My Year in the Wilderness. 1996. A collection of images 1970-1996 taken in various locations, including: Brazil, Italy, France, China and Spain. Inkjet printing on watercolor paper. Edition of 10.

== Solo exhibitions ==
2012

- Multimedia Art Museum, Moscow, Fearless Genius: The Digital Revolution in Silicon Valley 1985-2000.

2007

- Studio B Gallery, Woodstock, New York, Infinite City: A Walk Around New York
- Farmani Gallery, Los Angeles, California, Transcendent Spirit: The Orphans of Uganda.
- Holbrook Art Center, Millbrook, New York, Heaven, Earth, Tequila: Un Viaje al Corazón de México.

2006

- Innova Gallery photokina: Cologne, Germany, Selected Works.

2005

- Mexican Cultural Institute, Ministry of Foreign Affairs: Washington, D.C., Heaven, Earth, Tequila: Un Viaje al Corazón de México.

2004

- Farmani Gallery: Los Angeles, California, Lucky Shots

1997

- Digital Soup Gallery: Los Angeles, California, My Year in the Wilderness.
