= Harlem Street Singer =

Studio album by Blind Gary Davis
- Released: December 1960
- Recorded: August 24, 1960
- Studio: Van Gelder (Englewood Cliffs)
- Genre: Country blues; gospel
- Length: 42:54
- Label: Bluesville
- Producer: Kenneth S. Goldstein

Blind Gary Davis chronology
American Street Songs (1956)	Harlem Street Singer (1960)	A Little More Faith (1961)

Harlem Street Singer is a studio album by the American gospel blues singer-guitarist Blind Gary Davis, recorded in 1960 and released on the Bluesville label in December of that year. It features perhaps his best-known song "Death Don't Have No Mercy".

== Critical reception ==
Professional ratings
Review scores
Source	Rating
AllMusic	4.5/5 stars
The Penguin Guide to Blues Recordings	4/4 stars

Harlem Street Singer was met with critical acclaim. According to the journalist and Davis biographer Ian Zack, it proved to be "Davis's masterpiece and one of the most breathtaking recordings of the folk era", with "Rudy Van Gelder's pristine engineering capturing Davis's stellar guitar work and impassioned singing like lightning in a box". AllMusic reviewer Matt Fink later said, "Davis laid down 12 of his most impassioned spirituals for Harlem Street Singer ... Overall, the collection is well worth the purchase and should be considered essential listening for fans of country blues or gospel".

== Track listing ==
All compositions by Gary Davis except where noted

1. "Samson and Delilah" (Traditional) – 4:02
2. "Let Us Get Together" – 3:08
3. "I Belong to the Band" – 2:54
4. "Pure Religion" (Traditional) – 2:57
5. "Great Change Since I Been Born" – 4:03
6. "Death Don't Have No Mercy" – 4:41
7. "Twelve Gates to the City" (Traditional) – 3:08
8. "Goin' to Sit Down on the Banks of the River" – 2:55
9. "Tryin' to Get Home" – 3:46
10. "Lo I Be With You Always" – 4:17
11. "I Am the Light of the World" – 3:34
12. "I Feel Just Like Goin' On" – 3:29

== Personnel ==
=== Performance ===
- Blind Gary Davis – guitar, vocals

=== Production ===
- Kenneth S. Goldstein – supervision
- Rudy Van Gelder – engineer
