= Kid Bailey =

American singer

- Born: probably Mississippi, U.S.
- Died: after 1960
- Genres: Delta Blues
- Occupation: Musician
- Instruments: Vocal; Guitar
- Years active: early 1920s - 1950s

Kid Bailey (before 1929 – after 1960) was a Mississippi Delta bluesman. His one known recording session occurred on September 25, 1929, in Memphis, Tennessee.

Little is known about Bailey. His voice had a distinctly coarse yet youthful quality. Two of his recordings have survived: "Rowdy Blues" and "Mississippi Bottom Blues". There has been some speculation that Kid Bailey was a pseudonym of the blues singer Willie Brown. In most digital releases, the tracks are attributed to Willie Brown, yet are evidently the same artist credited as Kid Bailey on the original 78-rpm recordings.

It has been remarked that "Although it's almost a cliché to say this about a blues musician from the American South, Kid Bailey was one of the most enigmatic musicians of the era."

Bailey's songs have been covered by Ian A. Anderson, Rory Block, Doug Cox, the Be Good Tanyas, and Thomasina Winslow with Nick Katzman.

His song "Rowdy Blues" is included on the compilation album Masters of the Delta Blues: The Friends of Charlie Patton, released by Yazoo Records.
