= Death Don't Have No Mercy =

Song by Reverend Gary Davis

Song by Blind Gary Davis

from the album Harlem Street Singer
- Released: December 1960
- Recorded: August 24, 1960
- Studio: Van Gelder (Englewood Cliffs)
- Genre: Holy blues; spiritual
- Length: 4:47
- Label: Bluesville
- Songwriter: Gary Davis
- Producer: Kenneth S. Goldstein

"Death Don't Have No Mercy" is a song by the American gospel blues singer-guitarist Blind Gary Davis. It was first recorded on August 24, 1960, for the album Harlem Street Singer (1960), released by Prestige Records' Bluesville label during a career rebirth for Davis in the American folk music revival. The recording was engineered by Rudy Van Gelder at his studio in Englewood Cliffs, New Jersey, and produced by Kenneth S. Goldstein, who had pursued Davis in Prestige's effort to capitalize on the revival.

"Death Don't Have No Mercy" features Davis' characteristically lively yet simple style of blues guitar alongside arrangement techniques and themes from gospel music, in what has since been considered a work of the "holy blues" genre. Unusual for traditional blues players, Davis performed the chord progression in the key of G♭ major with guitar fills in the relative minor (E♭ minor), lending the song a heightened sense of tension and emotional appeal. The lyrics, based on traditional spirituals, are a lament of death's periodic inevitability and reflect events from the bluesman's early life in the American South, such as the loss of his mother and the premature deaths of his seven siblings.

"Death Don't Have No Mercy" was covered by Bob Dylan, the Grateful Dead, and Hot Tuna in the 1960s, reaching the era's young white rock audience. Its performance also took on political significance as the decade ensued with growing opposition to U.S. involvement in the Vietnam War. The song was one of the last Davis performed before his death, playing a fierce rendition of it at a Northport, Long Island church concert in April 1972, organized in part by the future photographer Doug Menuez.

== Background ==
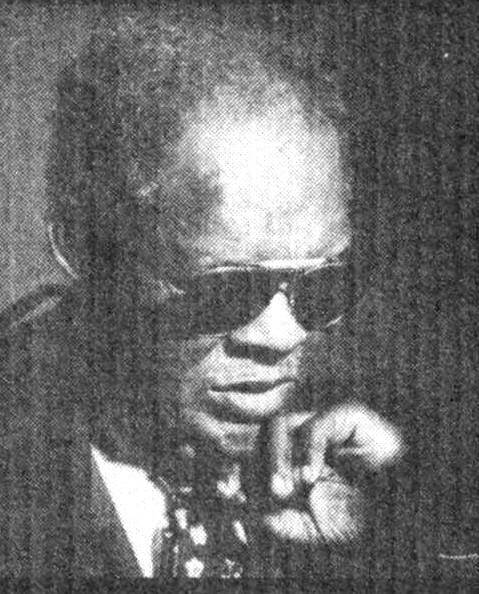
Davis in his 60s

Gary Davis was born in 1896 in impoverished Laurens County, South Carolina, to parents who were among the county's few black sharecroppers. His 17-year-old mother Evelina was promiscuous and bore seven more children, while his father John left during Gary's childhood and was gunned down by authorities in Alabama after he allegedly murdered a lover. With adequate health care services unavailable to African Americans, Davis began to go blind as an infant after improper treatment of an eye problem. While six of his siblings died in infancy. (Note: According to Gary Davis, at three weeks old he was taken to a doctor for sore eyes and treated with alum and milk, causing them to develop ulcers; a family friend's account attributed his blindness instead to Evelina having treated his eye infection with lye soap, a traditional folk remedy. When medically examined later in adulthood, he was assessed to have suffered from both juvenile glaucoma and corneal ulceration, a condition that can be caused by severe Vitamin A deficiency in the child or by neonatal conjunctivitis contracted from a mother afflicted with gonorrhea.) Evelina soon gave guardianship of him over to her own mother and, though still present in his life, refused any emotional connection with him, another event that profoundly impacted Davis and the themes he would explore in his musical career. (Note: As Davis later recalled, "I felt horrible about it 'cause I felt like I was throwed away. In fact, my mother never had cared as much about me as she did my younger brother. ... He was her heart. ... Because of the way she talkin' to me, she'd wish that I were dead. She tell me that a heap of times.") Despite this, she purchased an inexpensive guitar for Davis after he turned seven and had demonstrated a curiosity and talent for music, being exposed to instruments through family connections and to local sounds from plantation field work songs, informal rural gatherings, traveling tent shows, and spirituals sung in the black Baptist church, which served as a communal safe haven from the rising threat of racial violence.

By the 1930s, Davis was performing the blues and ragtime guitar professionally, appearing on recordings by the prominent Piedmont blues singer-guitarist Blind Boy Fuller. He also recorded some of his own under the stage name Blind Gary, although they sold poorly. Davis gave up playing the blues publicly upon converting to Christianity and being ordained a minister in 1937, before moving to New York in the early 1940s. There, he lived with his wife Annie in a modest East Bronx apartment, surviving on welfare checks, offerings from churches where he preached, and gratuities from his street performances in neighborhoods like Harlem. The following decade, he began giving guitar lessons to young, white blues players of the city's burgeoning folk music revival. His weekly performances at the Lower East Side apartment of Tiny Ledbetter (Lead Belly's niece), a gathering place for revivalists, also greatly influenced many young guitarists and enhanced his stature as a musician. By 1960, Davis was receiving supporting notices in publications like Sing Out! and The New York Times, while a network of local fans helped the 60-plus-year-old working minister navigate his musical career, leading to regular concert work in and around New York, membership in the musicians union, and a return to recording.

Davis played both blues and gospel music throughout his career, in a repertoire that also included ragtime piano compositions, Sousa marches, and parlor songs from the turn of the 20th century. According to the musician and author Dick Weissman, "Davis had a sort of unique bounce to his guitar work, and his gruff, impassioned singing was highly emotional." While his recorded work was ultimately religious music for the most part, he would be considered, alongside Blind Willie Johnson, to be the dominant performer of the "holy blues", a genre coined to describe Davis' style of traditional blues playing with lyrics conveying a religious message. Recurring themes in both his music and sermons included abandonment, lost children, the wilderness, death, and reuniting with his mother. (Note: Public records indicate that Davis' mother died in 1934.)

== Recording ==
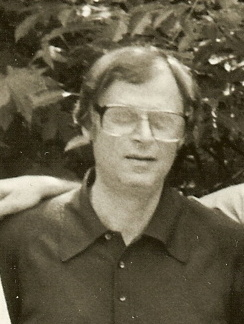
Rudy Van Gelder (1976), the recording's engineer

As a recording artist, Davis was pursued by Prestige Records producer Kenneth S. Goldstein, who first recorded him in 1956 for the Riverside record label. (Note: Both Riverside and Prestige were jazz-oriented record labels seeking to capitalize on the burgeoning folk revival.) By 1960, Goldstein had become the top producer of folk music in the U.S. and was working with Rudy Van Gelder, who himself had earned renown as a meticulous sound engineer for major jazz musicians and labels. The previous year, Gelder had his own studio built on a wooded lot in the suburb of Englewood Cliffs, New Jersey, featuring innovative recording equipment and a high-ceiling space designed for delicate acoustics. On August 24, 1960, Davis was driven from his apartment to the studio for a recording session that would produce songs for his prospective LP album Harlem Street Singer, among them "Death Don't Have No Mercy". Before reaching the studio, he stopped in Harlem and was photographed playing his guitar on a sidewalk for the album cover.

Under Goldstein's supervision, and with Van Gelder engineering the studio session, Davis played a weather-worn Gibson J-200 guitar and recorded 20 songs in the span of three hours, the last of which was "Death Don't Have No Mercy". He refused to take a break or redo a take through the session, following his penchant for playing songs "by the spirit" (in his words), often ignoring the timekeeping of record producers or concert managers. This resulted in performances that often exceeded the three-minute song length typical in popular music.

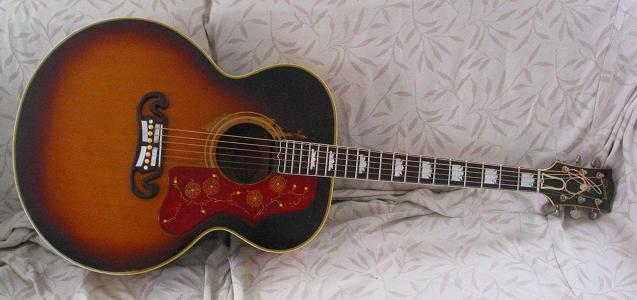
Davis played the song on a Gibson J-200 guitar (1960 model pictured).

Although Davis initially felt happy to be recording again, the session was filled with tension between him and Goldstein due to their clashing approaches and personalities. The producer, by his own account, did not object to Davis' insistence on recording single takes. "Every song was done in one take, which meant ... a helluva lot of editing", Goldstein later explained. "Okay a bad [guitar] break that was better between two later verses I could copy that over, splice that back into ... where the first verse was." According to the journalist and Davis biographer Ian Zack, Goldstein's comments on Davis may not be entirely reliable, as the bluesman was still performing at a peak level, while Goldstein was reputedly unfriendly with his recording artists. In his own defense, the producer argued that Davis had a poor working relationship in the folk industry. (Note: As Goldstein reasoned in regards to Davis, "How do you work with a man who ... had been so stung by people misusing him and ripping him off ... a street singer who was stolen from and who had his instruments stolen when he would fall asleep on the train ... He was a bitter man in a lot of ways.")

Davis' contract with Prestige earned him a $309 advance for the recording session – three times his previous payment from Riverside – and a twenty-cent royalty payment for each copy that Harlem Street Singer would sell in the U.S. It also gave Prestige an option to record him again through 1961.

== Composition and lyrics ==
"Death Don't Have No Mercy" is composed with words and music by Davis. It features techniques of arrangement and performance from his gospel songs, alongside his style of blues guitar. Davis' guitar accompaniment for the song is a relatively simple chord progression, performed in the key of G♭ major. It is strummed with occasional variations on a fill (played in E-flat minor with the upper bass strings) and a guitar break, wherein the melody is played on the lower treble strings. During the break section, Davis speaks the phrase "talk to me ...", which he often said in reference to his guitar. Commenting on his guitar playing, Zack says Davis demonstrates improvisation and a strong sense of chords while utilizing "the entire fretboard" in a way that deviates from the more conventional twelve-bar, three-chord blues of Robert Johnson and other recording acts in the genre.

Death on the Pale Horse by Gustave Doré, 1865. Death is personified as a merciless visitor in the song.

The lyrics of the song are a lament of death, portrayed as an inevitable and recurring visitor. Among them are the verses, "Well death will go in any family in this land / Well it come to your house and it won't stay long / Well you look in the bed and one of the family be gone". They resemble refrains and other text found in traditional spirituals such as "Death Come to My House, He Didn't Stay Long" (collected by James Weldon Johnson in 1926) and "Death Ain't Nothin' but a Robber" (collected by John Wesley Work III in 1940), both of which feature a variation of the following lyrics: "Death come to my house, he didn't stay long / I looked in the bed an' my mother [or father or sister or brother] was gone". While based on traditional spirituals, "Death Don't Have No Mercy" has "a strong autobiographical element" for Davis as "the only surviving child of eight", according to Zack. (Note: Davis' younger brother (and likely half-brother) Buddy Pinson died in 1930 at 25 years old after being stabbed with a butcher's knife by a girlfriend, leaving Davis as the sole survivor among Evelina's children.) According to the musicologist David Malvinni, the song "presents a terrifying personification of the instant, sudden possibility [of] death at any moment that could have come from the medieval era's confrontation with the plague".

In an analysis of the composition, the scholar and author Brent Wood writes:

"Death Don't Have No Mercy" unfolds as a minor blues mixing in major chords between the E-minor tonic and the B^{7} dominant, conveying the inevitability of death's periodic visit as the blues-form cycles and its lines repeat. A chord sequence descending by fifths from the B^{7} through E-minor, A, D, and G, then returning to B^{7}, develops the foreboding tone established by the minor tonic and dissonant dominant, portraying strength and balance slipping quickly away. The tension between fear and acceptance climaxes at the end of the second line with a chromatic climb from G to B^{7} supporting the repetition of "in this land," creating frightful anticipation and immediacy. This tension is then downplayed by a straight i–iv (E-minor to A-minor) chord change as the lyrics announce the physical discovery of a dead family member with a sense of resignation, and the first line repeats to conclude the verse.

== Release and reception ==
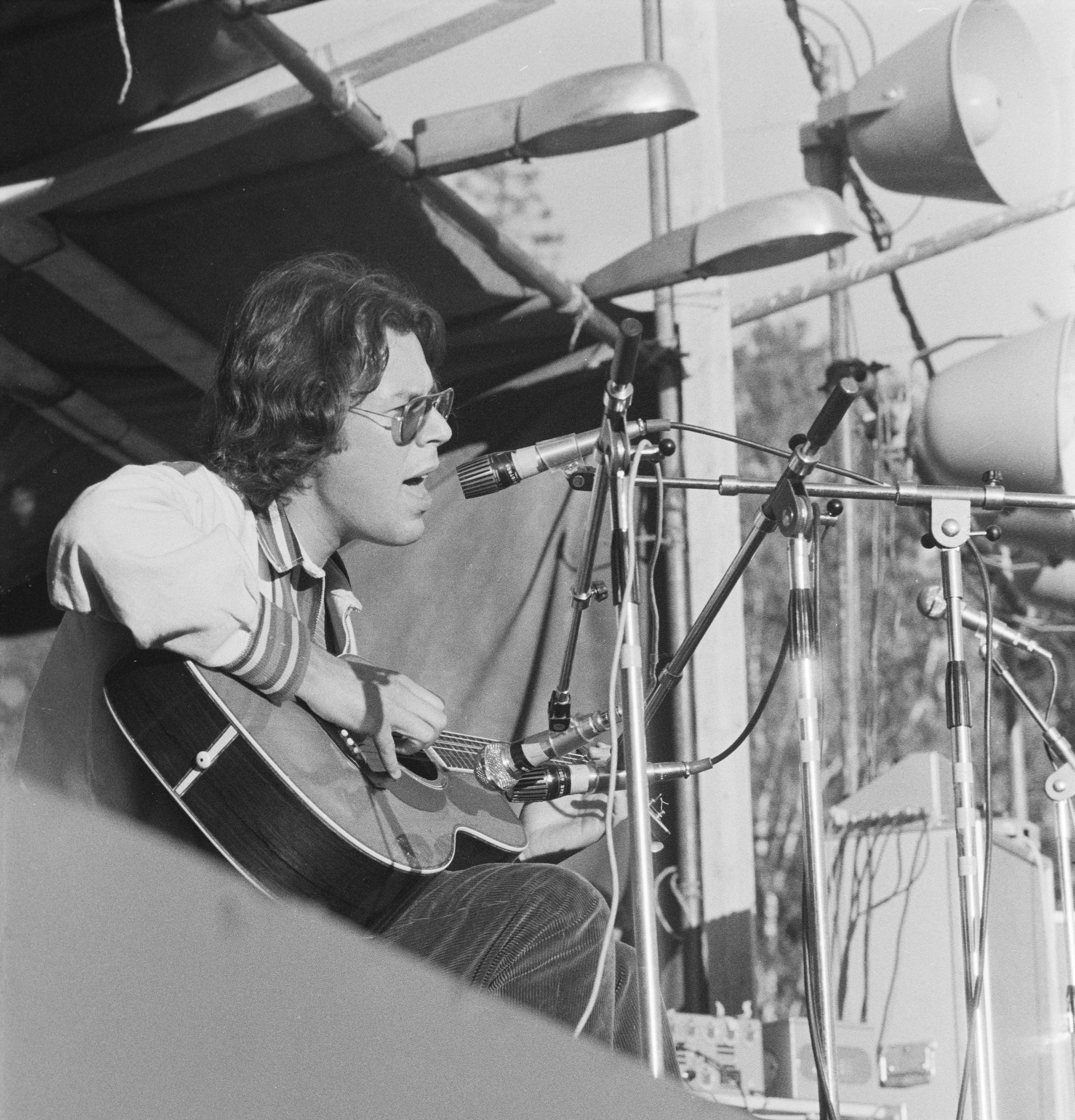
Stefan Grossman (1971) played a role in the song's publication and reissue.

"Death Don't Have No Mercy" was first featured on Harlem Street Singer, released in December 1960 on Bluesville Records (a Prestige imprint label) to critical acclaim. Davis was billed as Blind Gary Davis for the album. According to AllMusic, the song "became a folk hit in the '60s".

The composition was later published in Rev. Gary Davis: The Holy Blues (1970), a collection of sheet music and lyrics that gave Davis copyright protection for 80 of his original compositions and arrangements. The book was edited by the musician, historian, and Kicking Mule Records co-founder Stefan Grossman, who studied under Davis in the 1950s and went on to write a biography of him. The recording later appeared on the Davis compilation albums When I Die I'll Live Again (released in 1972 by Fantasy Records) and Let Us Get Together (released in 1974 by Kicking Mule).

"Death Don't Have No Mercy" is among the most popular of Davis' holy blues recordings. Zack says it is "perhaps his most famous song" while calling the line "death don't have no mercy in this land" a "signature lament". He contends that the original spirituals adapted for the song have survived in the public memory because of Davis' genius as an arranger, as his performance "in both the key of G and its relative minor (E) [...] was then almost unheard of among traditional blues-based guitarists", and his use of "dazzling single-string runs" served to "heighten the song's tension and pathos". Grossman describes it as "a beautiful, haunting piece of music". Referencing Davis' "gruff, shouting voice", Michael Ullman of Fanfare calls his performance "hair-chilling".

== Performances ==
A rendition of "Death Don't Have No Mercy" by Davis featured in the 1963 documentary short film Blind Gary Davis by Harold Becker, who juxtaposed the music against scenes of pedestrians on a cold day in Harlem. "Their weary visages, paired with Davis' mournful shouting and brilliant fingerpicking, provided the film's emotional finale", according to Zack. Davis was also recorded performing the song live in his set for the 1965 Newport Folk Festival in Newport, Rhode Island, which Vanguard released in 1968 as The Reverend Gary Davis at Newport. Zack calls the LP his "best-recorded live album", as it "captures him in fabulous form" and is made unique by his "shouting out spirituals" like "Death Don't Have No Mercy".

On October 16, 1965, Davis performed "Death Don't Have No Mercy" at a protest rally outside of Hunter College in New York, held in opposition to U.S. involvement in the Vietnam War. While not politically outspoken, Davis had frequently performed concerts benefiting causes of the Civil Rights Movement and played a "sing-in for peace" at Carnegie Hall a month earlier in response to the war. However, with anti-war sentiment beginning to intensify around the country, the rally proved an atypically turbulent event for the bluesman, whose performance accompanied speeches by the pacifist clergyman A. J. Muste and the journalist I. F. Stone while more than ten thousand protesters and counterprotesters clashed violently in nearby streets. Davis later played a seething, woeful rendition of the song for the 1970 documentary film Black Roots, which featured discussions on family and race relations among several prominent black figures, including Florynce Kennedy, who was shown in tears during the song.

=== Cover versions ===
Ironically, a song that was so personal to Davis would take on a whole new meaning for young white rock fans by the time the Grateful Dead and Hot Tuna covered it late in the decade during the worst Vietnam turmoil.

— Ian Zack

While Davis continued releasing more studio recordings in the early 1960s, many folk musicians rerecorded or performed his material live, particularly in the clubs of New York's Greenwich Village and Boston's own folk scene, where venues like Club 47 and Cafe Yana attracted collegiate crowds from nearby universities. "At the hoots of Cafe Yana and the Unicorn, people were playing 'Twelve Gates to the City' and 'Death Don't Have No Mercy,'" recalled David Wilson, who founded the Boston-based folk magazine Broadside in 1962. "It was pretty funny hearing some people trying to do that with the Gary Davis growl."

After seeing Davis play the 1961 Indian Neck Folk Festival in Branford, Connecticut, the then-novice folk singer Bob Dylan returned home to Minnesota and performed "Death Don't Have No Mercy", among other Davis and Woody Guthrie songs, at a party for University of Minnesota students. This performance was recorded and bootlegged as The Minneapolis Party Tape, which was appraised the following year in the local folk fanzine Little Sandy Review as "hectic and shaky, but [containing] all the elements of the now-perfected performing style". Dylan opened for Davis in late 1961 at a Bennington College concert in Vermont and would go on to cover the bluesman's songs occasionally throughout his own recording career.

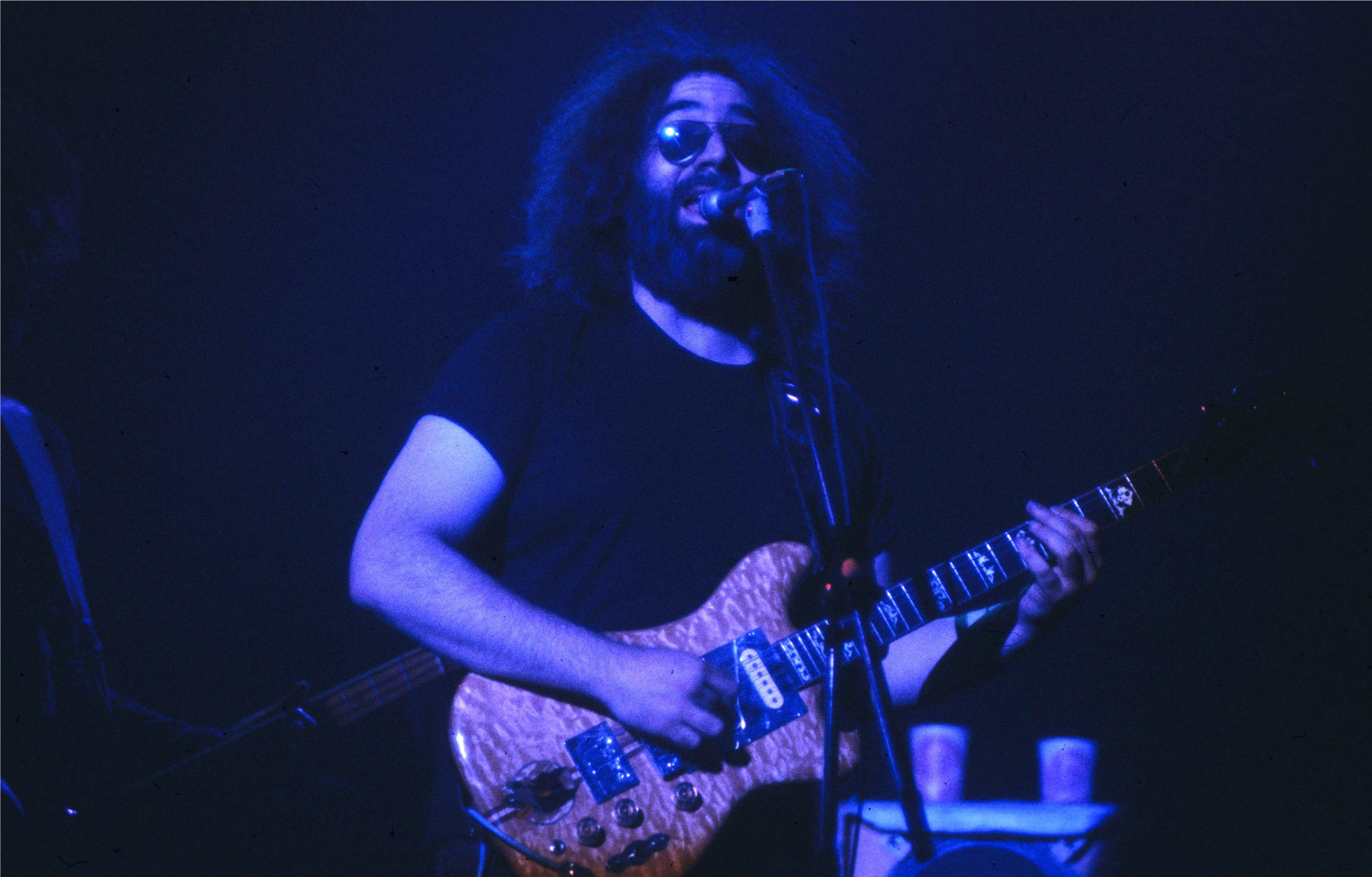
Jerry Garcia (1980) of the Grateful Dead, one of the song's performers

Jerry Garcia, a vocalist-guitarist for the Grateful Dead, first heard "Death Don't Have No Mercy" on Harlem Street Singer and incorporated it into the band's live repertoire in the late 1960s, transforming the song into a slow-moving, impassioned performance. The Grateful Dead debuted their rendition on January 8, 1966, during an Acid Test party held at the Fillmore West in San Francisco, in what was also Garcia's debut solo-vocal performance and "first instrumental exploration of the pathos inherent in melody and chord progression", as Wood describes. Nicholas G. Meriwether, a Grateful Dead archivist for UC Santa Cruz, later reviewed a bootleg recording of the show and found their rendition to be either "terrifying" or "a magnificent catharsis" while observing "spooky, gentle" and "eerie" qualities in Ron "Pigpen" McKernan's organ work.

On March 2, 1969, the Grateful Dead played "Death Don't Have No Mercy" again at the Fillmore West as a "sprawling, electrified ten-minute-plus version", as described by Zack. In this performance, the band plays an extended instrumental improvisation before Garcia sings in a livelier, more demonstrative manner. "As the lyrics become repetitive, death is more present, oxymoronically more 'alive'", says Malvinni, who notes that death is "personified as a live being, alive, stalking the living, the mother, sister, and brother (in this version, not the father)." This version was recorded and released later that year on the Grateful Dead album Live/Dead, which credited Davis for the song and earned him a royalty. (Note: Malvinni says that the album title's juxtaposition of "Deadness" (in reference to the band) and "liveness" (the authenticity and quality in live performance) may indicate an aesthetic strategy that resonates in the song, which attributes qualities of liveness to death.) The band's guitarist Bob Weir took lessons from the bluesman the following year at the suggestion of Jefferson Airplane guitarist and Davis fan Jorma Kaukonen, while the Grateful Dead in general drew influence from Davis' improvisational, broad-based style of blues guitar playing.

Kaukonen was also influenced by Davis and performed the bluesman's songs with his acoustic blues-rock band Hot Tuna. Kaukonen's rendition of "Death Don't Have No Mercy", which resembled the original, featured on the band's self-titled album, recorded in late 1969 at the New Orleans House in Berkeley and released the following year. Davis, usually unimpressed by other guitarists, expressed approval of Kaukonen's playing on hearing the album, saying, "That boy sure can play!" According to Zack, the Grateful Dead and Hot Tuna's cover versions in the late 1960s and early 1970s played a significant role in making Davis best known for "Death Don't Have No Mercy". Hot Tuna would later revisit the song as part of an acoustic blues set at the 2019 FloydFest in Floyd, Virginia. Reporting on the festival for Rolling Stone, Garret K. Woodward said that the rendition's "spooky atmosphere [benefited] from a venue that borders a nearby cemetery and the rolling hills of Floyd County".

=== Davis' final rendition ===
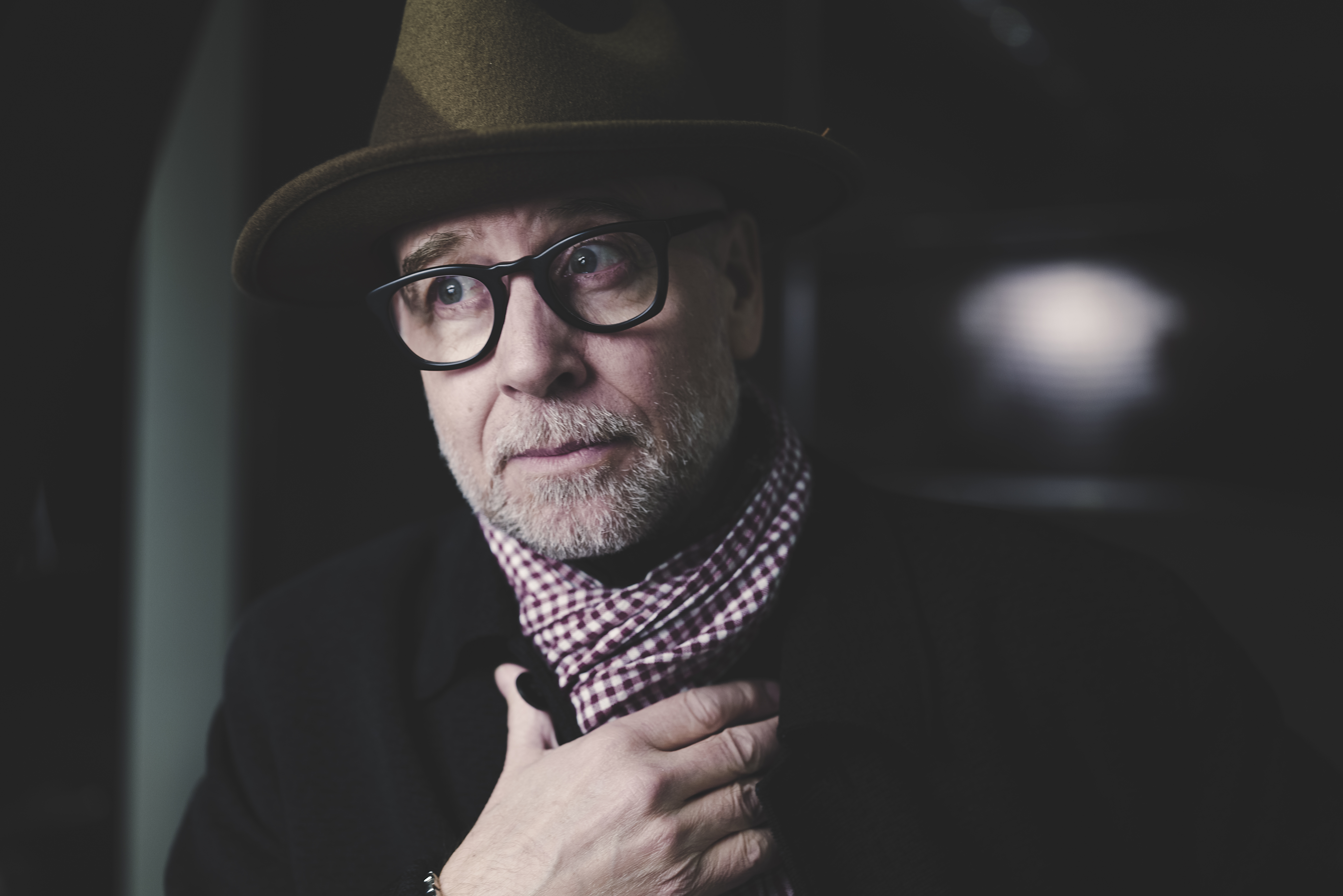
Doug Menuez (2019), then a young blues fan, helped organize Davis' last performance of the song in 1972.

"Death Don't Have No Mercy" proved to be one of the last songs Davis would perform before his death in 1972. In March of that year, while recuperating at a hospital from a heart attack, Davis received a letter from the teenage blues fans Doug Menuez and Seth Fahey, inviting him to play a concert in their Long Island village of Northport. The community, like many others at the time, was beset by alienation and acts of protest in response to the Vietnam War. Despite his severely weakened and underweight condition, and against the plea of his wife, Davis agreed to perform on a fee of $200. He visited Menuez and Fahey on April 24 to play the concert in Northport's First Presbyterian Church later that evening.

Menuez and Fahey escorted Davis down the aisle across a sellout audience of more than 250 people on the church's basement level. Upon reaching the stage, he shakingly tuned his guitar before opening with an intense performance of "Death Don't Have No Mercy". "He just came to life and just ripped the shit out of that guitar", Menuez recalled. "It was amazing. Everyone was blown away." Larry Conklin, a then-21-year-old Northport native and army dischargee sitting in the front row, later said of the performance that "all that shaking was gone and the fire came out and, boy, everybody was riveted. And I tell ya, I think it was a great moment for everybody there that night."

In ascribing Davis' fierce rendition of the song that night, Zack says that, "maybe it was being back in church, albeit not a Baptist one, or maybe it was adrenaline or the realization that he might not get another chance to perform." A few weeks later, on May 5, 1972, Davis died of a massive heart attack at the age of 76.

== See also ==
- African-American music
- Death (personification)
- List of Grateful Dead cover versions
