= Jah Levi =

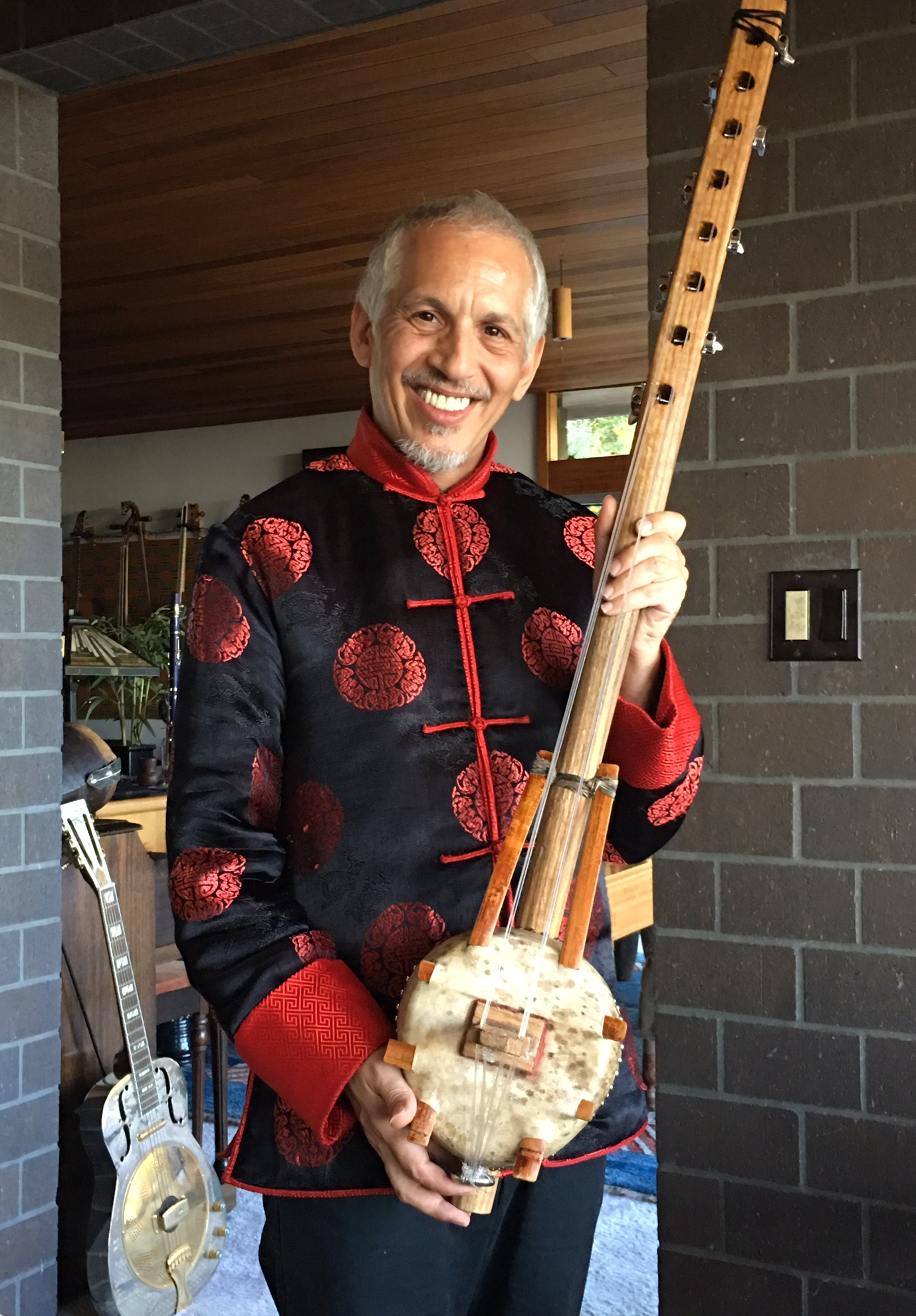

Background information
- Born: 1962 (age 62–63); Philadelphia, Pennsylvania, U.S.
- Genres: Reggae, World Fusion
- Occupation(s): Musician, Music Producer, Ethnomusicologist, Luthier, Workshop Leader
- Instruments: Bass, Guitar, Keyboard, Percussion, Sitar, Melodic, Rebab
- Years active: 1977–present
- Labels: Theocratic Records, Tree of Life Music Circle, Folklorica Records
- Website: www.jahlevi.com

Jah Levi (born 1962) is an American record producer and multi-instrumentalist songwriter, bandleader, luthier and archivist of folk and world music.

== Early life and education ==
Son of music producer and folklorist Kenneth S. Goldstein, Jah Levi was born in Philadelphia. His formal education includes a Bachelor of Arts in ethnomusicology with a minor in Black studies from Bard College at Simon's Rock and a master's degree in luthiery from the Roberto-Venn School. He studied world music with international masters and teachers, beginning with guitar lessons as a child in the 1960s from Reverend Gary Davis, whose music his father produced. While his primary instrument is the bass, he trained in the use of over 200 instruments and maintains a vast collection of rare instruments, following in his family lineage as an archivist, producer, and promoter of traditional music from around the world.

== Career ==
Jah Levi founded three record labels, including Theocratic Records (1983), Tree of Life Music Circle, and Folklorica Records (2016), producing over 200 albums for musicians in multiple genres from many ethnic traditions. He built the world's first solar-powered music studio for Theocratic Records, Jah Works Studio, in Oregon in the 1980s.

He has produced music featuring Ernest Ranglin, David Grisman, Steve Kimock, Vieux Farka Toure, Tahir Qawwal, Leroy Wallace, Prezident Brown, Lester Chambers, Dildar Hussain, Mutabaruka, and many others at his studios in Oregon and Northern California.

== Music ==
His primary band, Jah Levi and the Higher Reasoning, has performed roots reggae music for decades with musicians including "Horsemouth" Leroy Wallace, Ras Pidow, Sachi Hayasaka, Joshua Roseman, Rasul Siddik, Ronnie McQueen. Jerry Johnson and Kevin Batchelor of Steel Pulse, Jay Rodriguez, Kimati Dinizulu, and many other artists for international audiences since the 1980s. The band incorporates elements of ethnic music from all over the world-as well as liturgical chants in Hebrew, Arabic, and other languages.

Jah Levi has played many international events and festivals, including the Glastonbury Festival (England), the Philadelphia Folk Festival, Reggae on the River, Unite in Babylon (Tel Aviv), Mystic Rising, Beloved Sacred Art and Music Festival, Jerusalem Sacred Music Festival, and Seattle Hempfest.

With over 35 years of touring and over 40 albums of his own music released, he has performed on the same stage with Bob Dylan, Peter Gabriel, Ziggy Marley, Burning Spear, Ijahman Levi, Ras Michael, Culture, Israel Vibration, The Itals, Wailing Souls, The Persuasions, Black Uhuru, Andrew Tosh, The Wailers, Hamsa Lila, Lost at Last, Ester Rada and numerous others.

== Ceremonial work ==
In addition to music, Jah Levi is an herbalist and acupuncturist and practices a form of ceremonial healing work with plant medicines. He earned an OMD through the New England School of Acupuncture and Shenzhou Open University of TCM (Traditional Chinese Medicine) in Amsterdam, and founded the Healing Light Alternative Medical Practice in the Netherlands and Shamanismo Botanica in Amsterdam.

== The name Jah Levi ==
"Jah Levi" was also a stage name sometimes used by the late Jamaican singer Hugh Mundell, who was also known as "The Blessed Youth." While at least two other musicians have used the nickname Jah Levi at times during their career, Jah Levi is the only one to hold this as his legal name (rather than an alias) and it is the only name he has ever made music under, beginning in the early 1970s.
