= Tom Winslow =

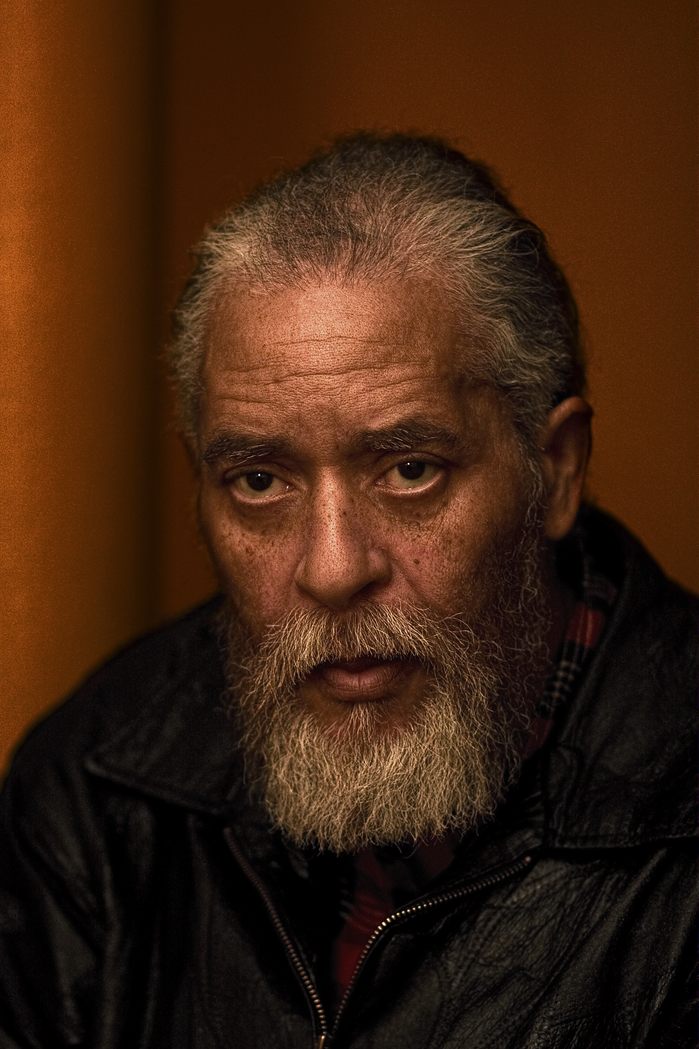

Background information
- Also known as: Thomas Winslow, "Brother" Tom Winslow
- Born: Thomas Griffin Winslow; November 13, 1940
- Died: October 23, 2010 (aged 69)
- Genres: African American music; blues; folk
- Occupation: Singer
- Instruments: Guitar; banjo; vocals
- Years active: 1960–2010
- Label: Biograph Records

Thomas Griffin Winslow (November 13, 1940 – October 23, 2010) was an American folk singer and writer known as a "disciple" of Reverend Gary Davis and a former member of Pete Seeger's band. He performed with his family as The Winslows and recorded with Al Polito. His career as a performing artist lasted over forty years. He was most notable as the composer of "Hey Looka Yonder (It's The Clear Water)", a folk song that has been the anthem of the Sloop Clearwater.

While he toured throughout the United States, he continued to perform in Upstate New York until shortly before his death at the age of 69. His children are the performing artists Thomasina Winslow and Gary T. Winslow.

== Early career ==
As a teenager, Winslow learned to play guitar from his grandfather, Thomas Winslow. He was a band member of the Reverend Gary Davis, a country-folk musician from the first half of the 20th century. He toured throughout the United States during the 1960s and 1970s, sometimes as a solo act, as well as with his family act, The Winslows. In the 1960s, he worked at Vassar College in the equestrian program, and off-season, as a construction worker at Albany, New York's Empire State Plaza.

== "Hey Looka Yonder (It's the Clearwater)" ==
Winslow is mostly known for penning and performing the now-classic ballad, "Hey Looka Yonder", which is also known as "It's the Clearwater" and "It's the Clear Water". This song, recorded by Biograph Records in 1969, is about the fundraising for the sloop Clearwater, and in particular how "black and white" got together to create a floating environmental education school. Its mission was to clean up the water of then-polluted Hudson River.

This song is significant and historic in several ways:

- It was the first environmental song by an African-American songwriter, predating "Mercy Mercy Me (The Ecology)" by two full years.
- It was Peter Seeger's and Tom Winslow's major collaboration.
- It was first recording by The Winslows - which included Tom Winslow's entire family, including toddler Thomasina Winslow, now a blues singer in her own right, singing and playing instruments in the background.

A hit for a musical tradition outside of the popular music mainstream, the album and single of "It's the Clearwater" are still relevant by collectors of old-time folk music.

== Folk music circuit ==
Winslow was part of the folk music circuit for four decades. His music has been described as "classic blues and spirituals" by "a seasoned craftsman".

Tom is an old-school country bluesman, picking and singing in a classic style. He studied with Rev. Gary Davis, collaborated with Pete Seeger, and released an album on the Biograph label. He first came to Saratoga to work with the horses and has for many years enjoyed playing gigs around the area, including at Lena's.

— Caffe Lena Web site

Winslow was a mentor for a number of musicians, including his children and Guy Davis.

== Later career ==
By the early 2000s he did not travel far from his home in New Baltimore, New York, due to care-taking for his wife, Edral, who died in January 2007.

He played frequently at the People's Voices Cafe on 33rd St. in New York City in the 1980s. He has also performed at the Towne Crier Cafe in Beekman, New York. His music has been played on WFMU's program, Shrunken Planet.

In 2001, he performed at a Lincoln Center's "Out of Doors" Reverend Gary Davis tribute show, performing with an all-star line-up.

He performed at least annually at the Caffe Lena, a folk and blues venue in Saratoga Springs. At his last show on September 16, 2007, he was joined by his daughter, Thomasina.

During the early 2000s he played regularly in Troy's Washington Park, and the Troy Farmer's Market; the last time being April 26, 2008. He was called an "Edu-tainer Par Excellence!"

His shows at the Troy Farmer's Market helped earn it the "Best Farmer's Market - Best Goods" awards from Metroland, the Capital District weekly newspaper, and his performance was lauded specifically. He shared in a "Best live regional entertainment" award.

== Death ==
He died on October 23, 2010, aged 69, from complications from a stroke.

== Discography ==
- Tom Winslow (Biograph 1969), includes "Bring Them Home" (a Pete Seeger tune).
- It's the Clear Water (Biograph 1969, re-released 1992) BLP-12018
- Inner Octaves (Truth Records 1978) (TR13712)
- Digital Podcast of Sunday Morning in Exile (compilation); Winslow performs "I The Living".
- PBS documentary, 'Til the River Runs Clear (soundtrack)
- Played with Gary Winslow on D Baby
- Played with Al Polito (guest guitarist)

== See also ==
- Reverend Gary Davis
- Peter Seeger
- Thomasina Winslow
