= Nick Katzman =

American blues musician (born 1951)

- Born: 1951 (age 73–74); New York, United States
- Genres: Blues
- Instrument(s): Vocals, guitar, lute
- Years active: 1960s–present

Nick Katzman (born 1951) is an American blues musician. Katzman was born in New York City, and lives in both Manhattan and Berlin, Germany. He plays in a variety of musical genres, including Chicago blues, Mississippi blues, Texas blues, and ragtime.

== Biography ==
As a teenager in the 1960s, Katzman saw many of the surviving country blues guitarists who travelled north to play their music in clubs and at the folk festivals. He learned to lay both guitar and lute. He studied classical music and jazz at Antioch College in Ohio. His classical influences include Sylvius Leopold Weiss and Johann Sebastian Bach.

His blues music was inspired by a number of musicians, including Charlie Patton, Kid Bailey, and Mississippi John Hurt. On his own website, Katzman also cites amongst his teachers the blues masters Mance Lipscomb, Reverend Gary Davis, Stefan Grossman and Rory Block.

About 40 years ago, Katzman moved to Germany to live, tour and perform.

== His music ==
Katzman discussed his musical influences as a mix of various strains of the blues, including Delta blues, country blues, folk music and hokum ragtime. His music has been described as a "wide range of blues from Delta to Gary Davis." Katzman's music has been compared to Tom Ball and Rich Stein. He has also been compared favorably with his blues forebears Blind Blake and The Rev. Gary Davis.

Katzman has collaborated with a number of senior Blues musicians, including Champion Jack Dupree, Carey and Lurie Bell, Louisiana Red, and Guitar Crusher.

Katzman also has mentored a number of younger musicians, including Thomasina Winslow. He continues to learn to play new instruments, including the lute.

In the United States, Katzman often plays at The Good Coffee House at the Ethical Culture Society meeting house in Brooklyn, New York, New York. He has been based (and currently as of 2007) in Germany. In May and June 2007, Katzman toured Europe with Winslow, including a headlining appearance at the Stamford, England at the Stamford Arts Centre. He returned to the Good Coffee House in April 2008, with "special guests Paul Handelman on harp and Thomasina Winslow on guitar and vocals."

== Discography ==
=== Solo, acoustic ===
- Mississippi River Bottom Blues (Kicking Mule KM 111) (1975)
- How to Play Delta Blues Guitar (Kicking Mule/Sonet SNKF 112) (1976, UK issue of KM 111)
- Panic When the Sun Goes Down (Kicking Mule/Sonet SNKF 112 (197?, UK re-issue of KM 111)
- Sparkling Ragtime and Hardbitten Blues (Kicking Mule KM 167) (1980)

=== Solo, electric ===
- Songs and Bloozes (Stumble Records)

=== Producer and compilations ===
- Guitar Crusher's Googa Mooga CD (Blue Sting Records) (producer, player)
- Eb Davis's Good Time Blues (Acoustic Music) (producer)
- Played with Ruby Green on the two-volume The Best Of Kicking Mule CD (Laserlight label) and Sparkling Ragtime & Hardbitten Blues, see above
- Guitarist – Composer Sampler (Kicking Mule 1997)
- Artist Direct
