= The Guitar & Banjo of Reverend Gary Davis =

Studio album by Reverend Gary Davis
- Released: 1964
- Recorded: March 2, 1964
- Studio: Van Gelder Studio, Englewood Cliffs, NJ
- Genre: Blues
- Length: 37:44
- Label: Prestige Folklore; FL 14033
- Producer: Samuel Charters

Reverend Gary Davis chronology
Say No to the Devil (1961)	The Guitar & Banjo of Reverend Gary Davis (1964)	The Reverend Gary Davis at Newport (1968)

The Guitar & Banjo of Reverend Gary Davis is an album by blues musician Reverend Gary Davis recorded in 1964 and released on the Prestige Folklore label.

== Reception ==
Professional ratings
Review scores
Source	Rating
AllMusic	3/5 stars
The Penguin Guide to Blues Recordings	4/4 stars

AllMusic reviewer Richie Unterberger stated: "Because this is an all-instrumental recording, it's an offbeat entry into the catalog of a performer known both as an important guitarist and as a singer. Some might miss Davis' vocals on this 1964 recording, but on the other hand there are plenty of records with him singing around. This gives listeners a chance to hone in on [sic] his dexterous guitar skills, blending ragtime, folk, and blues, usually on guitar (though he plays banjo on a couple of songs, and harmonica on one). ... not the best format for his strengths, certainly, but an illustration of his ability to adapt his style to unexpected material".

== Track listing ==
All compositions by Gary Davis except where noted

1. "Maple Leaf Rag" (Scott Joplin) – 2:58
2. "Slow Drag" – 2:27
3. "The Boy Was Kissing the Girl (and Playing the Guitar the Same Time)" – 2:42
4. "Candy Man" – 2:54
5. "United States March" (Traditional) – 6:31
6. "Devil's Dream" (Traditional) – 3:50
7. "The Coon Hunt" (Traditional) – 3:32
8. "Mister Jim" – 4:15
9. "Please Baby" – 3:18
10. "Fast Fox Trot" – 2:22
11. "Can't Be Satisfied" – 2:55

== Personnel ==
=== Performance ===
- Reverend Gary Davis – guitar, banjo, harmonica

=== Production ===
- Samuel Charters – supervision
- Rudy Van Gelder – engineer
