= Rick Smolan =

American photographer and author

- Smolan in 2026
- Born: November 5, 1949 (age 77)
- Education: Dickinson College
- Occupations: Photographer and author
- Notable work: A Day in the Life of Australia (1981); From Alice to Ocean (1992); The Human Face of Big Data (2012); The Good Fight (2017)
- Title: CEO, Against All Odds Productions

Rick Smolan (born November 5, 1949) is a former Time, Life, and National Geographic photographer best known as the co-creator of the Day in the Life book series. He is currently CEO of Against All Odds Productions, a cross-media organization.

== Background ==
Smolan is a 1972 graduate of Dickinson College and co-created the best-selling Day in The Life Series photography series with David Elliot Cohen who are credited for creating the mass market for large-format illustrated books. Smolan and Jennifer Erwitt, co-founders of Against All Odds Productions, have produced a number of global crowd sourcing projects. Fortune Magazine selected Against All Odds Productions as One of the 25 Coolest Companies in America.

More than five million of his books have been sold around the world, many have appeared on The New York Times best-seller lists and have been featured on the covers of Fortune, Time, and Newsweek. Smolan is also a member of the CuriosityStream Advisory Board.

== Data collection projects ==
In 2012 Smolan and co-author Erwitt published The Human Face of Big Data, a book in which Smolan and Erwitt used various photographs, graphics, and information to make big data easier to comprehend and absorb on a more personal, relatable level. [Human Face of Big Data] focusing on humanity's new ability to collect, analyze, triangulate and visualize vast amounts of data in real time.

In 2000 Smolan organized The Planet Project: Your Voice, Your World, one of the largest real-time internet polls in internet history, with the aim to get answers from over 1.5 million people in more than 240 countries on how they felt about their lives at the dawn of the new millennium.

== Notable works ==
From Alice to Ocean is a collection of photographs Smolan took of Robyn Davidson's 1,700-mile trek across the deserts of central and Western Australia that National Geographic Magazine sponsored. Davidson's writings along with Smolan's photographs became a National Geographic cover story. An autobiographical account of her trek was later published in 1980 as a book entitled Tracks, which included some of Smolan's photographs.

In 1996, Smolan and Erwitt published the Day in the Life book 24 Hours in Cyberspace: Painting on the Walls of the Digital Cave, a collection of photographs from 150 photojournalists, with the intention to, over a 24-hour period, chronicle how the internet was beginning to have a profound effect on the daily lives of people around the world. 24 Hours in Cyberspace (February 8, 1996) was "the largest one-day online event" up to that date, headed by Smolan with Jennifer Erwitt, Tom Melcher, Samir Arora and Clement Mok.

In 2003 Smolan and Cohen published America 24/7.America At Home, UK at Home, and America 24/7 encapsulates various perspectives on life by inviting the public to submit images, and enabled readers to place their own photographs within or on the book.

In November 2007 Smolan and Erwitt published Blue Planet Run : The Race to Provide Safe Drinking Water to the World, a series of photos illustrating attempts around the world to bring fresh drinking water to various communities suffering from lack of clean and consistent water supply.

In 2009, Smolan published Obama Time Capsule, which incorporated photos of Obama's first campaign for presidential office and his first 100 days in office. It includes commentary from various notable people including Arianna Huffington and General Colin Powell. 'The Obama Time Capsule was also published in a form where each book was printed separately and readers could include their own contributions and photos to personalize the individual book they would receive.

Smolan teamed up with Ridley Scott and Kevin Macdonald to "create the first user-generated feature-length documentary film shot on a single day" for YouTube underwritten project Life in a Day. This historic global film experiment enlists the global community to capture a moment of their lives on Saturday, July 24, 2010. Against All Odds Productions, Smolan's company, distributed "cameras to individuals in remote regions of the world in an effort to ensure that the film is as inclusive and representative as possible".

An Australian film based on Davidson's book, called Tracks, was released in August 2013, starring Mia Wasikowska as Davidson and Adam Driver as Smolan. In 2015 Smolan published Inside Tracks:Alone Across the Outback via a successful Kickstarter campaign. The project was released in conjunction with the North American film premiere in late 2014 of the film, and combines Smolan's photographs, excerpts from Davidson's book, images from the film, and an interactive app.

Most recently Smolan and Erwitt created The Good Fight: America's Ongoing Struggle for Justice. The book captures many aspects of the struggles of Americans who have experienced hatred, oppression or bigotry because of their gender, skin color, country of origin, religion, sexual orientation, disability or beliefs over the past 100 years. The book features more than 180 photographs, 63 embedded videos, over a dozen essays plus examples of music and lyrics that accompanied or inspired the struggle.

The Good Fight became one of Amazon's top 100 books within a week after it was released, and People magazine chose it as one of the "10 Best Books of the Year". The TED organization sent a copy to all 1,500 members as the official TED Book Club selection. The book won numerous awards including The Independent Book Publishers' “Freedom Fighter” Award, and Ben Franklin Association awards for “History" and “Politics and Current Events".

Smolan has acquired the television rights to Robert A. Heinlein's classic science fiction novel Tunnel in the Sky and has been developing a dramatic TV series based on the book. In 2023, Smolan was awarded the Ellis Island Medal of Honor, presented to individuals who embody the spirit of American patriotism, tolerance, brotherhood and diversity. Previous recipients include Bill Clinton, Elie Wiesel, Muhammad Ali, and Rosa Parks. In 2025, Smolan received the Photography Appreciation Award from the Hamdan International Photography Award (HIPA), an international photography award established in Dubai, United Arab Emirates, to encourage and spread the culture of photography across the world.
