= Diane Goldstein =

American folklore scholar

- Born: Diana Ellen Goldstein; 1956 (age 69–70)

Academic background
- Education: Memorial University of Newfoundland (B.S. 1979); University of Pennsylvania (M.A. 1983; PhD 1987)

Academic work
- Discipline: Anthropology
- Sub-discipline: Folklore studies
- Institutions: Memorial University of Newfoundland; Indiana University
- Website: folklore.indiana.edu/about/emeriti-faculty/goldstein-diane.html

Diane Ellen Goldstein (born 1956) is an American scholar of folklore, professor at Indiana University, and past president of the American Folklore Society.

== Biography and education ==
Goldstein's father, Kenneth S. Goldstein, was the chairman of the folklore department at the University of Pennsylvania, an influential figure in the folklore field, having worked during the folk revival movement of the 1960s; the dissemination of his text, A Guide for Fieldworkers in Folklore, which was published in 1964 is considered a standard in the profession.

She obtained a bachelor's degree in religious studies in 1979 from Memorial University of Newfoundland, followed by a M.A. (1983) and Ph.D. (1987) in Folklore and Folklife at the University of Pennsylvania. Her doctoral dissertation, supervised by Dell Hymes, was "Sharing In the One: An Ethnography of Speaking in a Mystical Religious Community."

She taught for twenty-four years in Memorial University of Newfoundland's folklore department, and in 1991 was cross-appointed to their School of Medicine. She has also served as the Director of Memorial University's Folklore and Language Archive in terms from 1993 to 1994 and from 2003 to 2005, and as the head of the university's Department of Folklore from 1997 to 2007.

== Honors ==
Goldstein has served as the president of the American Folklore Society (2012–13). In 2006 she gave a presentation through The American Folklife Center at the Library of Congress as part of the Benjamin Botkin lecture series, "What's in a Name?: AIDS, Vernacular Risk Perception, and the Culture of Ownership."

She held a three-year appointment to the Canadian Federal Committee for AIDS Priorities and Policy. She is the current president of the International Society for Contemporary Legend Research, and serves, or has served, on the editorial boards of the Journal of American Folklore; Folklore Ethnologies, and Contemporary Legend, Electronic Journal of Folklore and the Journal of Applied Folklore.

== Publications ==
- Once Upon a Virus: AIDS Legends and Vernacular Risk Perception (2004) Logan : Utah State University Press, 2004 ISBN .According to WorldCat, the book is held in 432 libraries
- Haunting Experiences: Ghosts in Contemporary Folklore (2007), (co-authored with Sylvia Grider and Jeannie Banks Thomas). Utah: Utah State University Press, 2007. ISBN 9780874216813 According to WorldCat, the book is held in 729 libraries
- "9/11 and After... Folklore in Times of Terror"
- (co-editor) "Reckless Vectors: AIDS and the Infecting ‘Other’ in HIV/AIDS Law."

Speaking in an interview shortly before her appointment as the American Folklore Society’s president elect, Goldstein is quoted as stating, "I am a firm believer that folklore, in its various guises, has vital perspectives on critical social issues…" but she also added, "I have extensive experience…convincing others outside of our discipline of the significance of our disciplinary perspectives and [I] would like to explore ways that we can better present those perspectives…to make our relevance visible within the academy, with the public and with cultural policymakers".
