= America 24/7 =

Photography book published by DK in 2003

- Flint Hills, Kansas: Three-year-old Bailey Lewis, her mom, dad and two brothers work and live on a 5,000 acre (20 km²) cattle ranch in central Kansas.
- Author: Multiple authors
- Illustrator: None; photographic collections
- Cover artist: Photo of three-year-old Bailey Lewis; photo taken by Dan White
- Language: English
- Subject: Culture and life in the United States
- Genre: Photographic
- Publisher: Dorling Kindersley
- Publication date: 2003
- Publication place: United States
- Media type: Hardback
- Pages: 304
- ISBN: 1-4053-0012-4 (UK edition)
- OCLC: 52919372
- Dewey Decimal: 917.3/0022/2 22
- LC Class: E169.Z83 A5 2003

America 24/7 was a photography book published by DK in 2003 about culture and life in the United States. It depicts life of Americans from every U.S. State.

== Project ==
The project was created by Rick Smolan and David Elliot Cohen, the team behind the New York Times #1 Bestseller: A Day in the Life of America.
