= David Elliot Cohen =

American author and editor

- Born: 1955 (age 70–71); Buffalo, New York, U.S.
- Occupations: Author, editor
- Notable work: A Day in the Life photography book series

David Elliot Cohen is an American author and editor who has, over a 30-year span, created more than 70 photography books. He is best known for the best-selling Day in the Life and America 24/7 series of photography books that he co-created with Rick Smolan.

== Early life ==
Cohen was born in Buffalo, New York in 1955. He grew up in Erie, Pennsylvania and attended Cathedral Preparatory School. He graduated from Yale University in 1977 with a degree in English literature.

He lived in Manhattan for ten years before moving to Marin County, California. He returned to Manhattan in 2014.

== Career ==
Cohen created four New York Times bestsellers: A Day in the Life of America (1986), A Day in the Life of the Soviet Union (1987), Christmas in America (1988), and America 24/7 (2003). His 2009 book, Obama: The Historic Front Pages was a USA Today and Wall Street Journal bestseller. His 2008 book, What Matters combined photo-reportage about essential issues of our time with essays by prominent commentators including Samantha Power, Jeffrey Sachs and Bill McKibben. The Chicago Tribune called the book, "Powerful and passionate."

He also wrote a travelogue, One Year Off (1999), which chronicles a rambling 16-month trip around the world by land, air, and sea with his three children, Kara, William, and Lucas. The San Francisco Chronicle called the book "honest, reflective, and often uproariously funny,". The New York Times was less flattering, calling it, "a book that proves it is also possible to go almost everywhere and learn almost nothing."

Cohen wrote a second travelogue in 2016, entitled The Wrong Dog. The Pittsburgh Post-Gazette said “Despite the adorable puppy portrait on the cover, the book is more than the story of Simba and the cross-country road trip. It’s a beautifully written memoir... funny, sweet, and sad.” In 2018 The Wrong Dog won an International Book Award, a National Indie Excellence Award and an Independent Press Award, all in the animal and pet books category.

=== Honors ===
Cohen's honors include a National Jewish Book Award, the American Jewish Committee's humanitarian award, a Catholic Press Association Award, and a silver medal from the king of Spain for the promotion of Spanish tourism. He currently serves on the board of the International Center for Journalists.

== Major works ==
Cohen, David Elliot; Rick Smolan (1983). A Day in the Life of Hawaii. Workman Publishing. ISBN 978-0-89480-760-2.

Cohen, David Elliot; Rick Smolan (1984). A Day in the Life of Canada. Collins Publishers. ISBN 978-0-00-217380-3.

Cohen, David Elliot; Rick Smolan (1985). A Day in the Life of Japan. Collins Pub San Francisco. ISBN 978-0-00-217580-7.

Cohen, David Elliot; Rick Smolan (1986). A Day in the Life of America. Collins Pub San Francisco. ISBN 978-0-00-255332-2.

Cohen, David Elliot; Rick Smolan (1987). A Day in the Life of The Soviet Union. Harpercollins. ISBN 978-0-00-217969-0.

Cohen, David Elliot; Rick Smolan (1988). A Day in the Life of Spain. Collins Pub San Francisco. ISBN 978-0-00-217967-6.

Cohen, David Elliot; Rick Smolan (1988). A Day in the Life of California. HarperCollins Publishers Ltd. ISBN 978-0-00-215162-7.

Cohen, David Elliot (1988). Christmas in America. Collins Pub San Francisco. ISBN 978-0-00-217968-3.

Cohen, David Elliot (1989). The Jews in America. HarperAudio. ISBN 978-0-00-215323-2.

Cohen, David Elliot (1989). A Day in the Life of China. Collins Pub San Francisco. ISBN 978-0-00-215321-8.

Cohen, David Elliot (1991). The Circle of Life. HarperOne. ISBN 978-0-06-250244-5.

Cohen, David Elliot (1992). America Then and Now. Harpercollins. ISBN 978-0-06-250176-9.

Cohen, David Elliot; Charles M. Collins (1993). The African Americans. Viking Studio. ISBN 978-0-14-024918-7.

Cohen, David Elliot; Lee Liberman (1994). A Day in the Life of Israel. Diane Books Publishing Company (Originally Collins Pub San Francisco). ISBN 978-0-7881-5162-0.

Cohen, David Elliot; Susan Wels (1995). A Day in the Life of Thailand. Collins Pub San Francisco. ISBN 978-0-00-255481-7.

Cohen, David Elliot (1999). One Year Off. Travelers' Tales (Originally Simon & Schuster). ISBN 978-1-885211-65-1.

Cohen, David Elliot; Rick Smolan (2003). America 24/7. DK ADULT. ISBN 978-0-7894-9975-2.

Cohen, David Elliot (2008). What Matters: the world's preeminent photojournalists and thinkers depict essential issues of our time. Sterling. ISBN 978-1-4027-5834-8.

Cohen, David Elliot; Mark Greenberg (2009). Obama: The Historic Front Pages. Sterling. ISBN 978-1-4027-6902-3.

Cohen, David Elliot (2009). Nelson Mandela: A Life in Photographs. Sterling. ISBN 978-1-4027-7707-3.

Cohen, David Elliot (2012). The Clintons: Their Story in Photographs. Sterling. ISBN 978-1402787881.

Cohen, David Elliot (2016). The Wrong Dog. Yellow Pear Press. ISBN 978-0997066418.

== Pro bono works ==
Cohen, David Elliot; Tides Foundation; Doug Menuez; Ron Grant Tussy (1989). 15 Seconds. Island Press. ISBN 978-0-9718021-0-0.

Cohen, David Elliot (1995). Requiem for the Heartland. Harpercollins. ISBN 978-0-00-649203-0.

Cohen, David Elliot (2002). A Day in the Life of Africa. Tides Foundation. ISBN 978-1-55963-038-2.
