= Thomasina Winslow =

American singer (died 2023)

- Also known as: Sina Winslow, Thomasina, Tunes
- Born: August 15, 1965
- Died: January 13, 2023 (aged 57)
- Genres: Blues, soul, R&B, gospel, funk, folk, African American music
- Instruments: Singer, guitar, electric bass
- Years active: 1969–2022
- Label: Biograph

Thomasina Winslow (August 15, 1965 – January 13, 2023) was an American blues musician and the daughter of folk musician Tom Winslow. As a toddler, she sang back-up on her father's folk music classic Hey Looka Yonder (It's The Clearwater); also singing a solo version of One-Two-Three, another version of which she produced on her own 30 years later. In addition to her solo career, Winslow has been a member of four bands, including a duo with Nick Katzman and Nite Train. Furthermore, she has been a teacher in that genre of music, and has significantly influenced other aspiring musicians. Winslow primarily performed covers of Blues standards and has written a number of blues and gospel tunes in her own right. She was also one of a handful of African-American women producers in the "indy" music industry.

While she had been teaching a full load of school and private students for over a decade, her primary notability has been from touring in the eastern United States and Europe with Katzman, starting in 2006.

Winslow continued to tour on and off until 2022. On May 6, 2011, she again played with Nick Katzman at Katzman's "favorite U.S. venue," The Good Coffeehouse Music Parlor (GCMP), located in Brooklyn, New York. This marked the third time that the coffee house has hosted Winslow. She took another tour of Europe in the summer of 2011, marking her French debut.

Her final large concert was for the Eddies, a local awards ceremony for the Capital District of Upstate New York, in late 2022; and her last private concert was on New Year's Eve 2022. She died from a stroke on January 13, 2023, at the age of 57.

== Biography ==
=== Early life ===
Winslow was born in 1965, and grew up in New Baltimore, New York, south of Albany. Something of a child prodigy, she was nicknamed "Tunes" by her brother. She first performed on her father's album Tom Winslow, singing "1-2-3" ("One-Two-Three") as a toddler. She also sang back-up that year on the folk music classic Hey Looka Yonder (It's the Clear Water) (It's the Clearwater), about the Sloop Clearwater.

As part of her family's group, The Winslows, she toured throughout the folk music festival circuit, including The Great Hudson River Revival.

=== Education ===
Winslow attended Ravena-Coeymans-Selkirk Central Schools. She received her A.A. in Performing Arts from Schenectady County Community College and her B.A. in music performance from the University at Albany, where she majored in Classical Guitar. In December 2021, she received the degree of Doctor of Ministry, honoris causa, from Covenant of Avalon Theological Seminary.

=== Music teaching ===
Winslow's day job was that of a music and performing arts teacher at Saint Anne Institute, a reform school for girls, where she administered the "Expressive Arts" program. She was quoted as saying "Teenagers have a lot to express, especially children-at-risk. But they haven't always been directed as to how to do that. We try to help them." Funding for this program was a Youth Advancement Through Music and Art (YATMA) grant. In addition to the Expressive Arts award, she has won numerous other grants, including a New York State Education Department grant.

== Solo tours ==
=== Winter 2007 to Spring 2008 tour ===
Winslow made a short Upstate New York solo tour during December 2007 and early 2008. She had her first headlining show at Caffe Lena in Saratoga Springs, in addition to featured guest spots on WRPI in Troy, New York and WAMC in Albany, New York, as well as gigs at the Java Jazz Cafe on January 3, 2008, in Delmar, New York.

In March 2007, she was featured in Caffe Lena's "3rd Annual Blues Fest" alongside Mark Tolstrup and Beaucoup Blue. In May 2008, Winslow returned to Java Jazz for a second show.

=== Summer 2008 ===
In mid-2008, Winslow played gigs further out in Upstate New York, including three gigs each at Colonie Center and the Barnsider BBQ Restaurant in Lake George.

=== WRPI live show ===
On December 8, 2008, Winslow performed a one-hour live show on WRPI, the college radio station of Rensselaer Polytechnic Institute, for its "Stormy Monday Blues" show.

=== 2009 Tour ===
Winslow had a significant tour in Spring 2009. This included a performance at Marietta, Ohio's River City Blues Festival in March 2009, a show in Easton, New York, blues festivals in Denmark and Germany, and return shows at Caffe Lena and the Good Coffeehouse with Nick Katzman.

=== 2012 Tour ===
Winslow made her Australian debut at the Cairns Blues Festival on May 12, 2012.

=== 2014 ===
Winslow performed at the 2014 Clearwater Festival.

== Bojembe ==
Winslow was a guitarist, co-lead singer, and musician in the R&B band, Bojembe. The other members were John Zumbo, Sean Mack, and Terry Plunkett. They produced one album in 2005–2006 before the band became inactive, but is still sold online. Most of the songs from the CD can be purchased in MP3 format. Bojembe's most recent public gig was at the River Street Beat Shop in Troy, New York, for which a blogger wrote that "Winslow's roots are in the deep folk-blues tradition, (while) her work with Bojembe leans toward a decidedly funky groove with a world music spin."

== Management and production ==
Winslow was the owner of a production company, Winslow Productions. As part of her production work, Winslow also mentored up-and-coming performing artists.

Winslow was, for a while, an artistic agent. She has also collaborated with a local visual artist, Kim Morris, for a concert and art show.

Sales of music she has performed or produced has sold more outside the United States. This has been especially in England and Germany, where she has performed with Nick Katzman, as well as in Poland, Denmark, and Latin America.

== Collaboration with Nick Katzman ==
One of Winslow's most fruitful and notable collaborations has been with Nick Katzman. As related in that article, Katzman has mentored a number of younger blues artists, including Winslow, taking her "under his wing." The duo has performed from Brooklyn, New York to Stamford, England and Berlin, Germany.

=== 2006–2007 Brooklyn gigs ===
In April 2006, Katzman was slated to perform at the Good Coffeehouse Music Parlor in Brooklyn, his favored venue in "the States". He had previously performed with Ruby Green (Terry Garthwaite), and had recorded Sparking Ragtime & Hardbitten Blues, a now-classic LP, with Green, since released as a CD, so their fans expected they would perform again together. Instead, Winslow substituted for Green; in Katzman's own words:

I was getting my e-mail and was about to zap what I thought was ... spam.... I decided to open it anyway and it turned out to be a letter from a singer/guitarist named Thomasina Winslow who said she was covering tunes from my Kicking Mule LPs on her new CD. Now, mind you, this is NOT an everyday occurrence for me, so I went immediately to CDbaby and listened to her recording. She had a version of "I'm Goin' Away" where she played guitar at least as well as I did and sang wonderfully. I was of course flattered that someone was so involved with my music and very impressed with how well she handled the material. It turns out that she is the daughter of a Gary Davis disciple named Tom Winslow and apparently she grew up around the Davis' scene and was pretty much brought up in a folk-blues household.

She said that I was a primary musical influence for her, so I've asked her to come and do a guest appearance at the gig, and she said she'd come all the way down from Albany to do it, so it looks like we'll be hosting Thomasina Winslow on that night, too. I'm not sure how much exposure she's had or even how much she's done professionally. The idea of my music somehow finding its way back to young black musicians is very exciting for me.
I'll be meeting her for the first time at the gig, so it should be an

interesting night.

— email from Nick Katzman, quoted at IGS Guitar Forum blog of April 2006

Fans of Katzman were once again on notice about a second show in April 2007.

=== 2007 tour with Katzman ===
Winslow flew out to Germany to tour with Katzman in the summer of 2007, when they performed a few gigs in Berlin, Germany and recorded music videos.

The duo played at the Stamford Arts Centre Blues and Folk Festival, and were the second-billed act for "Guitar Day" ("8.30pm Nick Katzman & Thomasina Winslow 10.00pm Jeff Lang"). It was favorably reviewed in Monty's Music News, an on-line Music newsletter, as a "great evening Concert in The Ballroom." Blogger Ginger Mayerson called their performances "cute" and "Oh, I just love these trips down memory lane, don't you?", adding "I like the way this singer, Thomasina Winslow, sings."

=== 2008 work with Katzman ===
In April 2008, Winslow and Katzman recorded a song for a future CD. They also performed together again at the Good Coffeehouse in Brooklyn on April 25, 2008.

They received the "Artist of the Day" from the oneartistaday.com website, which celebrates "Independent artists", on October 1, 2008.

=== 2009 tour ===
Winslow and Katzman toured both America and Europe in mid-2009. They had gigs in Brooklyn, Saratoga Springs, and Easton, New York from April to May 2009. They performed at the Mississippi Blues Nacht Festival in Köpenick, Germany on July 18 and 19, 2009.

=== 2010 tour ===
Katzman and Winslow took a short tour of Germany and Denmark in July and August 2010. They performed in Bad Sobernheim and Skarrild, Denmark at the Danish Folk, Blues, and Ragtime Guitar Festival. She also performed a solo gig in Frankfurt, Germany.

=== 2011 tour ===
On May 6, 2011, Winslow once again played with Nick Katzman at Katzman's "favorite U.S. venue," The Good Coffeehouse Music Parlor (GCMP). This marked the fourth time that the Good Coffeehouse has hosted Katzman, and the third time for Winslow.

== Other collaborations ==
Winslow recorded a music video with Marco Haber of Mudfunk in December 2007, covering "Fly Like An Eagle". She performed in the Old Songs Sampler Concert in Voorheesville, New York in January 2010. She appeared as a part of a group of female musicians at a Caffe Lena show called Ladies Sing the Blues in February 2010.

For many years until 2022, she also performed with Nite Train, and had been scheduled to perform again with them on February 4, 2023, at Caffe Lena.

== Legacy ==
Schenectady County Community College, of which she was an alumna, has set up a scholarship fund in her name, with the first fundraising concert on August 9, 2024.

== Discography ==
- Cat on a Mission - Nite Train with Thomasina Winslow
- Bojembe
- Essential Tunes
- Return
