= Reverend Gary Davis =

American blues and gospel singer and guitarist (1896–1972)

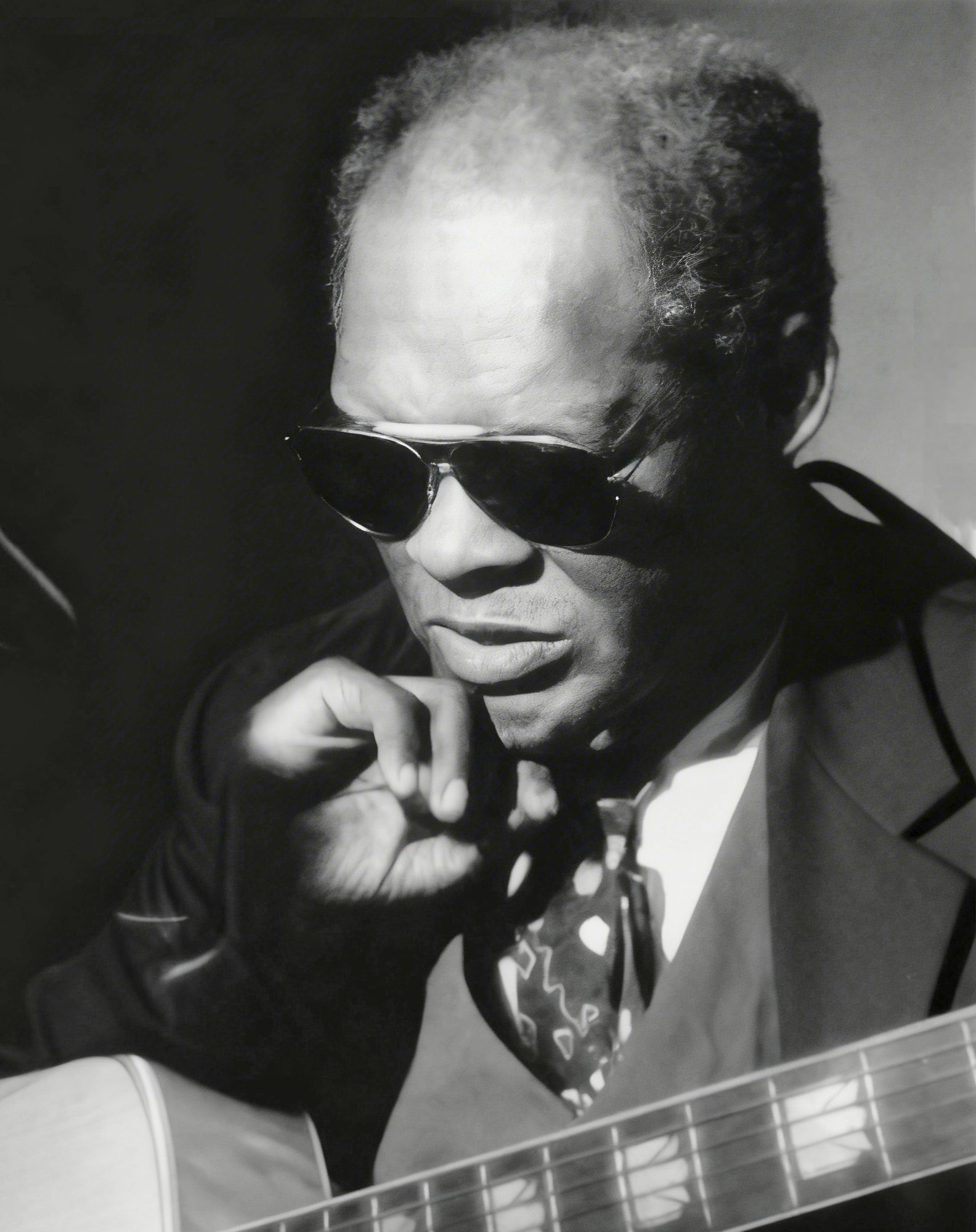
- Davis in a recording studio circa 1960 (restored image)

Background information
- Also known as: Blind Gary Davis
- Born: Gary D. Davis; April 30, 1896; Laurens, South Carolina, U.S.
- Died: May 5, 1972 (aged 76) Hammonton, New Jersey, U.S.
- Genres: Gospel blues; Piedmont blues; country blues; folk blues
- Instruments: Guitar; vocals; banjo
- Years active: 1930s–1970s

Gary D. Davis (April 30, 1896 – May 5, 1972), known as Reverend Gary Davis and Blind Gary Davis, was an American blues and gospel singer who was also proficient on the banjo, guitar and harmonica. Born in Laurens, South Carolina, and blind since infancy, Davis first performed professionally in the Piedmont blues scene of Durham, North Carolina, in the 1930s, then converted to Christianity and became a minister. After moving to New York in the 1940s, Davis experienced a career rebirth as part of the American folk music revival that peaked during the 1960s. Davis' most notable recordings include "Samson and Delilah" and "Death Don't Have No Mercy".

Davis' fingerpicking guitar style influenced many other artists. His students included Stefan Grossman, Rick Ruskin, David Bromberg, Steve Katz, Roy Book Binder, Larry Johnson, Alex Shoumatoff, Nick Katzman, Dave Van Ronk, Rory Block, Ernie Hawkins, Larry Campbell, Bob Weir, Woody Mann, and Tom Winslow. He also influenced Bob Dylan, the Grateful Dead, Wizz Jones, Jorma Kaukonen, Keb' Mo', Ollabelle, Resurrection Band, and John Sebastian (of the Lovin' Spoonful).

== Biography ==
=== Early years to 1942 ===
Davis was born in Laurens, South Carolina in the Piedmont region, on a farm that was, by his recollection, "way down in the sticks; so far you couldn't hear a train whistle blow unless it was on a cloudy day".

Of the eight children his mother bore, he was one of two who survived to adulthood. He became blind as an infant. He recalled his grandmother telling him he got "sore eyes" when he was three-weeks old, and the doctors put something in his eyes that "cause[d] ulcers to grow" over the eyes and he ended up blind.

He recalled being poorly treated by his mother and that his father placed him in the care of his paternal grandmother. Davis reported that when he was 10 years old, his father was killed in Birmingham, Alabama. He later said he had been told his father was shot by the Birmingham sheriff. His mother remarried and gave birth to a boy.

He sang for the first time as a boy in the choir at Gray Court's Baptist church in South Carolina. He took up the guitar, first attempting to construct home made instruments, then acquired a cheap mail order instrument paid for by his mother on which he played any time he could, learning his first chords from a local musician named Craig Fowler.

Most sources state (following Davis' own account) that around 1910/1911, when Davis would have been about 15 years old, he played for several years in a black string band in Greenville, a town some 35 miles from Laurens (though less from Gray Court), comprising (according to Ian Zack) Davis, a fellow blind guitarist of the same age Willie Walker who was also very competent, two violins, a bass violin and a mandolin, which would likely have performed a wide-ranging repertoire of blues, ragtime, dance tunes, vaudeville or minstrel show songs, plus any other popular songs of the day. Zack, does, however, make space for a comment (on his p. 275) that these dates for his (Davis') and Walker's membership of the string band may be wrong: in addition to both guitarists' seemingly young ages in 1910 or 1911, Davis on another occasion stated that he played with Walker when both resided in Greenville, which according to city directories and other sources was not until 1915 for Walker and 1917 for Davis.

In 1914 at the age of 18, Davis was enrolled in a Blind School, the South Carolina School for the Deaf and the Blind in nearby Spartanburg County. He attended some classes in industrial training and possibly conventional music on orchestral instruments as well as learning New York Point, a counterpart of (and competitor to) the American Braille system of reading for the blind, but stayed for only six months, returning to the farm on which his family worked. He later said: "I stayed on the farm till I got grown ... When I left off the farm I was twenty-one years old. When I started travelin' through the country. Playing guitar. Goin' from one city to another".

By this time, Davis was already developing a unique multi-voice style on the guitar produced solely with his thumb and index finger, playing gospel, ragtime, and blues tunes along with traditional and original tunes in four-part harmony. By the time he was around 21 he had established himself in Greenville (whether or not he had performed there earlier), "performing in barrelhouses, chasing women, and singing on corners for nickels and dimes" (Zack), while at the same time keeping up at least a partial attendance in black churches, later to be a cradle for gospel music. However within a couple of years he had met a woman some five years his senior, Mary Hendrix, and a few months later on 17 June 1919 the couple were married. Davis continued his trade as an unaccompanied minstrel while his new wife took in washing and ironing; in 1923 the couple moved north to Asheville, North Carolina, and later to Winston-Salem. Their marriage ended there (in 1924 according to Davis' later welfare file). Davis spent most of the remainder of the 1920s as a wanderer, spending some time in Washington, North Carolina, and also Durham, which he would eventually adopt as his new home for a while, moving there in the late 1920s and staying with his mother, with whom he had evidently become reconciled, who had obtained a job as a tobacco stemmer in a local factory owned by Liggett and Myers.

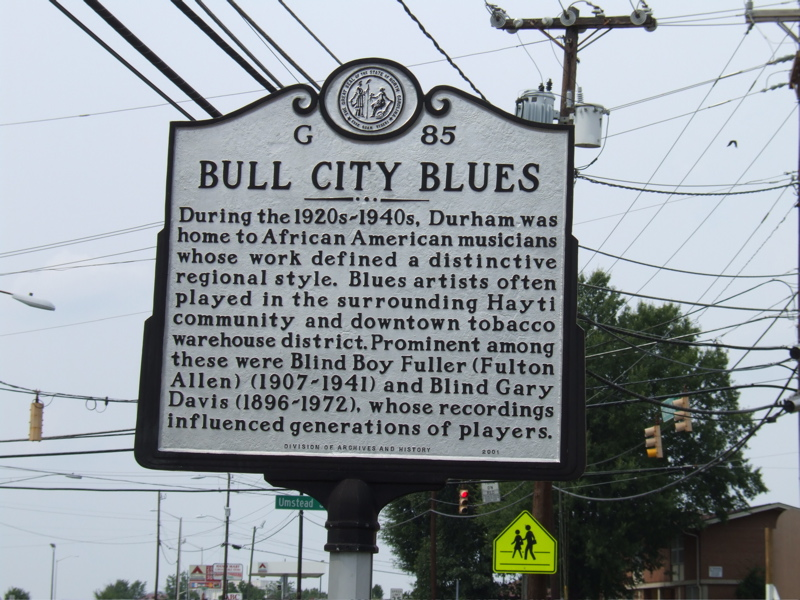
Bull City Blues historical marker, Durham, North Carolina

In the late 1920s, when Davis moved to Durham, it was a major center of black culture at the time. There he taught Blind Boy Fuller and collaborated with a number of other artists in the Piedmont blues scene, including Bull City Red, while continuing his own activities as a street performer. However, by 1933–34, Davis' interest in performing Christian (Gospel) material appears to have slowly taken over, apparently accelerated by the illness and eventual death of his mother which occurred in June 1934. Zack writes that, although a number of sources give the date of Davis' ordination as a minister as 1933, this did not occur until 1937 in Washington, North Carolina; meanwhile his growing interest as an "evangelist in training" evidently set his life on a new course, although financially it came at the worst time (just following the Great Depression in the United States). This limited his earnings so that from 1934 for several years, he was in poor financial straits and had to apply to the Durham welfare office for assistance, stating that he was willing to undertake any menial work of the type(s) previously envisaged for its inmates at the South Carolina Blind School he had attended in his youth.

A potential breakthrough occurred in July 1935 when J. B. Long, a store manager with a reputation for supporting local artists, introduced Davis, Fuller, and Red to the American Record Company, recording 15 sides in New York with Davis, comprising two blues, "I'm Throwin' Up My Hands" and "Cross and Evil Woman Blues", and the remainder all gospel numbers. Fourteen of these were released but were not large sellers, possibly because the market for gospel tunes was small, and partly because (according to Zack) although Davis' performances on guitar were spectacular, his vocals sounded a little strained, possibly on account of poor health. Although these earliest recordings are of huge value to scholars and listeners today, at the time they produced little direct impact for Davis, who returned to a life of near destitution in Durham. When a follow-up recording session in 1939 was mooted, Davis declined the offer. Up to 1943 he was still an itinerant preacher existing on welfare, with visiting workers recording that "His main interest in life it seems is religion... he stated that he was more interested in saving souls than in money".

=== 1943–1959 (move to New York) ===
In 1942 things finally started to look up for Davis: on his preaching trips he often passed through Raleigh, North Carolina and there caught the eye of Annie Belle Hicks, a twice divorced religious woman who ran a boarding house there, was attracted to Davis and his music, and offered him companionship and a place to stay. Things went well and in November 1943 the couple exchanged vows before a justice of the peace in Durham; Ian Zack comments that most likely, Davis' second marriage would not have been recognized legally because Davis had never officially divorced Mary Hendrix, so while his first wife was still living he could not legally be married again. Davis and Annie went on to be together as actual or de facto husband and wife for the remainder of his life. In late 1943, Annie followed two of her daughters who had relocated to New York City and was able to obtain a position as housekeeper to a family there; in January 1944 Davis joined her, and before long the couple had taken up residence in a second floor apartment in the East Bronx, where they were to stay for the next 16 years. Annie worked intermittently as a domestic help, while Davis remained an itinerant circuit minister (becoming ordained for a second time in either Harlem or The Bronx), preaching and singing the gospel primarily at storefront Baptist churches around the city; although it was by then illegal, he also brought in a little more funds performing Christian songs on the city streets. In 1945 his playing on the street came to the attention of the up-and-coming folk record producer Moses Asch who recorded around 31 minutes of music, of which, however, only one piece, the non-religious instrumental "Soldier's Drill" (retitled "Civil War Parade") was to appear on a U.S. release, 1967's Folkways collection of Asch recordings. Meanwhile, another four tunes were eventually licensed to appear in Britain, as part of the 1965 XTRA release Rev Gary Davis/Short Stuff Macon. Despite their historic value, these recordings were unlikely to have made much difference to Davis' situation since he was probably not paid for the session.

Meanwhile, a few small glimmers of recognition were coming. In 1946 one of Davis' compositions, "Message from Heaven" was published in sheet music form, credited to "Rev. G.D. Davis". It seems that this route for making a little money by selling print versions of his material never led to any repeats of the activity, while in 1949 (courtesy of assistance from fellow musician Brownie McGhee) Davis was recorded again, this time for Continental Records who recorded six sides of which two were issued (as one 78) on its sister Lenox label. They failed to make any impression in the record market (Chris Smith, in The Penguin Guide to Blues Recordings, asserts that this session actually took place in 1945, but this is disputed by Zack, who states that external evidence points to the 1949 date being correct). In 1950, Davis made his debut as a New York performer on a proper stage, appearing among others (although unannounced) and performing two numbers at the January 28 Lead Belly Memorial Concert at New York's Town Hall. Early the same year, a young sound recordist, Tony Schwartz, happened to document Davis playing on a street corner; how much material was recorded is unknown, but one track "Twelve Sticks" survived and was issued in 1957 on the Folkways Album Music in the Streets; Zack comments that, although it can hardly have generated much of an audience, it remains an important document of Davis' early period in New York, and that the playing "continues to confound guitarists more than six decades later". The folklorist Alan Lomax also started championing Davis, presenting him in private concert in July 1950. Lomax was forced (by growing anti-Communist sentiment) to leave the U.S. for Europe that September, but via his ex-wife Elizabeth (later name Elizabeth Lyttleton Sturz), with whom he remained on good terms, obtained an extensive taped interview with Davis covering his early life up to the then present day, which when typed up came to 300 pages and remains the single most impressive set of interviews with a black bluesman of his generation on record.

By the early 1950s, Davis had begun to get a reputation as a superb player and performer among the small but nascent New York white folk music fraternity. John Cohen, later a founder member of the New Lost City Ramblers, visited Davis several times in 1952 and 1953, taking photographs and making a set of 1953 home recordings that would eventually be released half a century later as If I Had My Way: Early Home Recordings on Smithsonian Folkways. These recordings are unique in that on several of them, Davis is joined on vocals by another singing preacher, the Reverend McKinley Peebles (who also has a track to himself, accompanying himself on the guitar), with whom Davis was sometimes performing on the street at that time. Cohen's initial recordings from the previous year, made on a wire recorder and previously thought lost, have also emerged and been made available in 2010 as a 12 track session via the Field Recorders' Collective. An even earlier home recording session also survives, comprising seven tracks recorded in 1951, and only recently discovered and made available as the Ellen Stekert tapes, now made available for listening via YouTube. Between these three informal recording sessions, Stekert and Cohen's recordings documented some 34 different items in Davis' repertoire of the time, including such subsequent well known pieces as "Civil War Parade", "I Am The True Vine", "Say No To The Devil", "Twelve Gates To The City" and "Twelve Sticks", but also renditions of several songs nowhere else recorded.

In 1954, a recording session was arranged for Davis for the New York-based Stinson Records by a young Kenneth S. Goldstein, then at the start of his career as a record producer, featuring Davis on guitar and vocals backed by Sonny Terry on harmonica, the result being released as a ten-inch LP entitled The Singing Reverend. According to Ian Zack, the record is marred by Terry's harmonica being recorded at too high a level while the level of the guitar is low, although on careful listening it is quite adequate as a representation of the two players, however in any case it failed to attract much attention. Meanwhile, between 1954 and 1957, Davis began to be featured, along with other blues artists, at a series of concerts under the name "Midnight Special". In a quote from future music writer Lawrence Cohn, Ian Zack states: "Brownie [McGhee], Sonny [Terry] and Gary all took turns... [while the others were playing], Gary would catnap. When it came to his turn, Brownie would give him a shot in the ribs, Gary would startle awake, proceed to knock the audience out with some incredible piece of music, then go back to sleep until it was his turn again", and that Davis must have been exhausted from his other two jobs, preaching and street singing, and having to wait his turn at midnight concerts that sometimes did not get going until 1 a.m. had to have been difficult. In January 1956, Davis once again recorded for Goldstein, who had half an LP-worth of material already recorded by Pink Anderson and wished to bulk it out for LP release; for this session (released as American Street Songs under both performers' names) Davis recorded nine songs in two hours. This included his earliest studio recording of a song later to become famous, "Samson and Delilah", and old spiritual first recorded in 1923 but most likely based at least in part on a 1928 release by Blind Willie Johnson, although with a much more complex arrangement. A set of "private recordings" made around this time, in generally good quality apart from some occasional minor tuning issues, dated 1955-1957 were released in 2002 as the album The Sun of our Life; one feature of this release is the inclusion of an "apocalyptic" 20 minute excerpt from a full one hour sermon delivered in front of a church congregation, which "may deter some listeners" but offers a unique insight into Davis' role as a black preacher before his transition to the world of (predominantly white) 1960s folk music audiences.

In June 1957, Davis made some private recordings for Fred Gerlach and Tiny Singh (Lead Belly's niece, a family friend, later Tiny Robinson) that would be issued six years later in the UK as Pure Religion and Bad Company on 77 Records; this made a big impression on UK devotees of the music but was looked upon askance by Davis, who had never intended that recordings of his "secular" material should reach a wider public.

Across an ocean from Davis' activities, his reputation was beginning to be spread via New York City native Ramblin' Jack Elliott, who included the Davis secular tune "Cocaine" on a ten-inch UK LP in 1958 (this was a tune that Davis would no longer perform in public, but was happy to play for his students in private). Elliott's rendition inspired a number of budding British guitarists to take up the song (including John Renbourn, Bert Jansch, Ralph McTell and Keith Richards) and set them off in search of more of the Reverend's material. Late in 1958, Manny Greenhill, future manager of Doc Watson, Joan Baez and others, started to take an interest in Davis as a potential concert performer for the emerging white, mainly college educated folk music aficionados and arranged him some bookings. Among them was the inaugural 1959 Newport Folk Festival; Davis' appearance there in the Sunday night concert was only a partial success, owing to poor weather (it was raining on the audience gathered for the outdoor stage on which he performed) and the audience's preoccupation with newer, youthful acts such as The Kingston Trio. Nevertheless, when Vanguard Records later issued the 1964 LP Blues at Newport, misleadingly subtitled 'Recorded Live at the Newport Folk Festival 1963', two tracks ("Samson and Delilah" and "I Won't Be Back No More", better known as "Goin' to Sit Down on the Banks of the River") from Davis' 1959 performance were on it. Also by 1959, Davis started performing further afield, travelling with 21-year old guitar and banjo picker Bary Kornfeld, then a student at Queens College, the duo appearing (although performing separately) at the Golden Vanity folk club in Boston for a week in January 1959; recordings of Davis from Columbia University made in 1958-1959 also exist, made by Davis' first New York student John Gibbons, and reproduced as the first disc of Stefan Grossman's posthumous Davis compilation Demons and Angels (Shanachie, 2001).

=== 1960–1972 (recognition and remainder of life) ===
Around 1960, the Davis's were still poor and dependent on welfare to supplement their meagre earnings, however word was beginning to spread about Davis' talent, assisted in part by a cover feature on him for the February 1960 issue of Sing Out! magazine penned by Barry Kornfeld, calling him "one of our greatest folk artists". Davis obtained bookings at some folk festivals and, at age 64, started his first residency at a folk club Gerde's Folk City in New York, performing two shows a night during the week and three at weekends; for this he had to obtain both a cabaret identification card and join the musicians union, which marked the beginnings of his transition to an officially recognized, professional musician, and was at last earning some regular money. Also in 1960, Davis was approached once again by the now well established Kenneth Goldstein with a view to making some higher profile recordings, his previous ones being no longer in print; in the subsequent sessions, recorded at Rudy Van Gelder's studio in New Jersey, Davis, then still at the height of his powers as a performer, recorded 20 songs in three hours using his weather beaten Gibson J-200 guitar, resulting in an LP Harlem Street Singer. In Zack's words, this was "Davis' masterpiece and one of the most breathtaking recordings of the folk era... the all-gospel set included some of his most indelible classics, featuring soaring vocals and a remarkable interplay between voice and virtuoso guitar". For this recording Davis not only received a $309 advance but also a royalty on every LP sold in the U.S.; while that sum is likely to have only been modest, it represented a considerable advance on the financial situation resulting from any of Davis' previous recording efforts. Despite some reported animosity between Goldstein and Davis during the sessions—Davis was never keen to do more than one take, while Goldstein was keen to stop the tape for the smallest perceived mistake—Goldstein proceeded to record Davis on several more sessions, resulting in three further albums' worth of material, Say No to the Devil (including Davis on 12-string guitar) and A Little More Faith (both recorded 1961) and The Guitar and Banjo of the Reverend Gary Davis (recorded 1964; also featuring Davis on blues harmonica). Taken together, these four albums (released on the Prestige record label) are recognized as holding some of Davis' finest work.

Through the early 1960s Davis started to travel a little for bookings including in Boston, and while at home in New York would attend folk music gatherings at Washington Square on Sundays. In 1962, a then 16 year old Jewish kid Stefan Grossman sought out Davis for lessons, with Davis becoming "like a surrogate grandfather in a way" and Grossman in return absorbing everything Davis could show him, and sometimes spending eight hours at the Davises. Grossman was to repay the debt handsomely, becoming Davis' greatest disciple through the late 1960s onwards, releasing instructional books, hours of privately taped material on LP, and compiling videos (later on DVD) featuring filmed performances of Davis for others to learn from or simply appreciate. As with the other white students of the day, Grossman was initially more interested in Davis' secular than his sacred material, which Davis could sometimes be persuaded to perform (in private only), particularly if Mrs Davis (who disapproved) was absent. After the lessons were over, as often as not, Davis would return to his life as a street singer, performing on a street corner with his tin cup to collect small change from the passers by, a situation which continued until royalties from Peter, Paul and Mary's rendition of "Samson and Delilah" meant that he could finally give up this means of support (see below). In the meantime, the Davises, who had moved to another, still run down apartment in the Bronx, were featured in a short 1963 film Blind Gary Davis by U.S. filmmaker Harold Becker, which succeeded mainly in showing the poor circumstances in which the singer and his wife were living at the time.

In early 1964, Davis was one of a number of black artists booked to travel to the UK for a two-week tour, the others being Muddy Waters, Sonny Terry, Brownie McGhee, Sister Rosetta Tharpe who played rocking electric guitar with her brand of high energy gospel music, and Cousin Joe the pianist and singer from New Orleans. Dubbed "The American Blues and Gospel Caravan" and managed by a young Joe Boyd, the group of musicians—which initially did not get along particularly well but had bonded by the end—played concerts across Britain plus a final session in Paris; the English reviewers spoke highly of Davis' performances. An audio recording of Davis' 40-minute set at Manchester's Free Trade Hall exists and was released on CD in 2008; Davis was absent from the stage (set) when the remainder of the group performed a one-off concert that was filmed on an abandoned railway station outside Manchester, but was included (briefly) in a filmed performance for French television on the final date in Paris. The experience was repeated in 1965 under the auspices of the English Folk Dance and Song Society, this time featuring the black artists Davis and Josh White, and American white artists Ramblin' Jack Elliott, Derroll Adams and Buffy Sainte-Marie, again with Joe Boyd as tour manager. Once more this impressed the British audience and reviewers, perhaps to the extent at this time his profile was higher in Europe than back home.

As the folk revival of the 1960s invigorated Davis's career, he performed once more at the Newport Folk Festival in 1965, this time to much greater acclaim; previously unseen footage of his performance was included in the 2014 biographical film documentary Harlem Street Singer. Eleven songs from those performances were released on the 1967 album At Newport. In March 1966, Davis appeared (sharing the episode with Donovan and sitar playing singer Shawn Phillips) playing two numbers on Pete Seeger's long running Rainbow Quest television program, appearing in Episode 23 of the 39 made. Davis appeared to disconcert the show's host with his lengthy performances—"Children of Zion" and "Oh Glory, How Happy I Am", both on 12-string guitar—but the result forms a valuable audio visual document of Davis' performing style at this time. Four months later, Davis left for his third visit to the UK, this time as a solo artist, performing in folk clubs, now aged 70; over a three-week period he appeared in 13 different locations.

As the mid-1960s gave way to the late 1960s, the "folk boom" in the U.S. was fading. New generations of youths were more likely to be experimenting with mind altering drugs and listening to the Grateful Dead, Jimi Hendrix and The Doors than to older style, acoustic troubadours such as Davis and his peers—many of the once thriving, larger "folk" establishments closed their doors and Davis was relegated to playing smaller, less lucrative venues locally, while taking some longer performing trips to places such as Chicago, Los Angeles and Seattle, where he performed for the Folklore Society.

In March 1969, Davis' former student and driver, John Townley, who had since established Apostolic Recording Studio, persuaded Davis to his first recording studio session in five years. The resulting album, O, Glory – The Apostolic Studio Sessions was not released until 1973, after Davis' death; although artistically it has been considered of less interest than his earlier output, it does contain several insights into Davis' extended musical ability, including the only known recorded instances of his performing on the five-string banjo (on "Out on the Ocean Sailing") and basic piano (on "God Will Take Care Of You", accompanying a small choir (hastily put together from studio employees, according to Zack). The session included the first studio recordings of "O, Glory How Happy I am" and "There's Destruction in thei Land", and also included Larry Johnson contributing some harmonica work; one number "Soon My Work Will All Be Done" was recorded as a duet with Annie, the only example of such on record although they had doubtless done so countless times either at home or in church. Zack notes that, despite a somewhat lukewarm review of the album by a Down Beat reviewer on its release, the album contains "some real gems". Around this time, Davis also acquired a custom twelve-string guitar made by luthier Božo Podunavac, which became his second favorite instrument (christened "Miss Bozo") after his Gibson J-200 6-string guitar ("Miss Gibson").

Also around this time, Stefan Grossman had been spending much time editing a book of transcriptions of eighty of Davis' songs, published by Robbins Music in 1970 under the title Rev. Gary Davis: The Holy Blues, finally granting copyright protection for these works, and Yazoo records issued the LP Reverend Gary Davis: 1935–1949, making copies of Davis' first recordings on 78 readily available to contemporary listeners for the first time. Also in 1970, Davis was filmed (for the first time in color) contributing to Lionel Rogosin's film Black Roots, performing " Belong to the Band" and "Death Don't Have No Mercy" on the 12-string "Miss Bozo"; during the second tune, several of the listeners around the table, themselves prominent African-American personae, can be seen to be in tears. Later that year, Davis formed a close relationship with a young Canadian guitarist Larry Brezer, who lived with the Davis's for a year in New York driving Davis around and generally helping him and Annie with their lives, an arrangement that was repeated a couple more times with other live-in students in succeeding years.

In 1971 Davis made his final studio recordings for Biograph Records, the "studio" in fact being the living room of the townhouse of Sherman Fairchild in which the latter had installed state-of-the-art recording equipment. Using just "Miss Bozo", Davis recorded 25 songs over a five-hour period, including a version of "Candy Man" with Brezer on second guitar; he also retuned to an open guitar tuning (based, however, not on an open chord but on a D6) to play one tune with a spoken commentary, "Whistlin' Blues", with a slide. The sessions would be released the same year as two separate albums, Volume 1 - New Blues And Gospel and Volume 2 - Lord I Wish I Could See. Reviewing one of these for Jazz and Blues Magazine, English critic Paul Oliver wrote: "It must be admitted that his abilities are waning a little [but] ... it's a touching, somewhat wistful album that may not be the Reverend's best, but is still a reminder of his exceptional powers. He has had an undeservedly hard life and we're all culpable for having taken him for granted." (Quoted in Zack, p. 247).

Also in 1971, Davis received an invitation for what would turn out to be his final UK visit, a sixteen date tour of UK venues culminating in appearance as headliner at the 1971 Cambridge Folk Festival, one of the biggest (if not the biggest) in Europe at that time. Annie tried to get him to decline on account of his advancing age, but Davis felt that he needed to keep working so as to be able to carry on paying the mortgage on their small home (they had acquired a tenant for the Newtonville house) and to provide for Annie in the event that he should die, saying: "I want to have it so you won't have to go around and beg nobody". Audiences and critics in Britain voiced concerns that Davis might be too old and frail to give good performances, but in the event they were tremendous successes, one writing: "The old negro effortlessly coaxes a gentle, ambling rhythm from the guitar. Walking bass. Smooth syncopation. His voice, at first feeble and unintelligible, grows rapidly stronger until the words are plain... Suddenly the air is pierced with a tremendous cry: "Glory, hallelu." Can this man really be in his 76th year? Can he really be blind? He is certainly happy." After the success of this tour, Davis returned to the U.S. but once more took a flight to Belgium to play at a major rock festival alongside Al Stewart, Rory Gallagher and others; although dwarfed by huge on-stage amplification from the other acts, his set reportedly went down well. However he returned to New York tired. Three months later he was hospitalized, possibly suffering a stroke; over the next several months Devis was in and out of hospital for various ailments, including suffering a heart attack in February 1972. He did play one last show in April, and reportedly played well after initially appearing rather feeble. On April 30 that year he celebrated his 76th birthday, preaching at a local Baptist church and singing one song. In the first week of May, the Davises were being driven down to their Newtonville House to inspect some maintenance work when Davis had a heart attack in the car; he was taken to the William B. Kessler Memorial Hospital in Hammonton, New Jersey, but could not be revived, and was pronounced dead at 11.47 a.m.

Davis' funeral was held at Union Grove Missionary Baptist Church in the Bronx, where he had preached at many services, the location appalling Phil Allen as "an extraordinarily desolate street and small stand-alone church surrounded by tenements"; Zack opines that, rather than a grand send-off, it was what Davis would have wanted, a "simple service by and for the small black church community that meant so much to Davis". A number of Davis' white students attended the service, and were bemused that his musical gifts were not even mentioned; in fact the minister probably "didn't even know the dead person". The next day, his body was taken to Rockville Cemetery in Lynbrook, New York, where he is buried in plot 68 under a simple marker which also included his wife's name for when her time might come. In the event she survived him by a further twenty five years, dying in December 1997 at the age of almost 102, having attended church regularly until her one hundredth year.

Peter, Paul and Mary recorded Davis' version of "Samson and Delilah", under the title "If I Had My Way", a song by Blind Willie Johnson, which Davis had popularized. Although the song was in the public domain, it was copyrighted as having been written by Gary Davis at the time of the recording by Peter, Paul and Mary. By March 1964, resulting royalties allowed Davis to buy a small house (a semi-detached brick bungalow with a basement, in Jamaica, Queens) and live comfortably for the rest of his life, and Davis referred to the house as "the house that Peter, Paul and Mary built;" additional royalties allowed them to purchase a second house in Newtonville, New Jersey, which they used as a weekend getaway. The Grateful Dead covered "Samson and Delilah" on their album Terrapin Station and credited it to Davis. They covered Davis' song "Death Don't Have No Mercy". Eric Von Schmidt credited Davis with three-quarters of Schmidt's "Baby, Let Me Follow You Down", which Bob Dylan covered on his debut album for Columbia Records. The Blues Hall of Fame singer and harmonica player Darrell Mansfield has recorded several of Davis's songs. The Rolling Stones credited Davis and Mississippi Fred McDowell for "You Gotta Move" on their 1971 album Sticky Fingers.

Around the time of Davis' death, his former student Stefan Grossman had decided to release more of Davis' work, resulting in the release of several albums of home recordings and concert tapes, commencing with Ragtime Guitar on the UK Transatlantic record label (home recordings 1960–1971) and Children of Zion, also on Transatlantic, featuring a 1962 concert recorded at Swarthmore College, Pennsylvania; a double-LP set Lo' I Be With You Always on Kicking Mule, 1973, comprising various home and concert sessions recorded between 1959 and 1968; Let Us Get Together on Sonet, 1974 (mainly 1960s home recordings, some in his publisher's office); I Am a True Vine (Heritage, 1985, tracks leased from Stefan Grossman, recorded 1962–63). More than 15 other discs of non-studio recordings of Davis have subsequently released on a range of labels including Folkways, Document, Wolf, Heritage, Shanachie and more (refer Discography).

== Contemporary reception and recorded legacy ==
While Davis' main body of recorded work, from around 1960 onwards, was generally well received, his recordings would scarcely be classed as huge sellers; reasons for this would mainly center around his decision to record mainly gospel music (a position he relaxed a little later in his performing career) which contrasted with the earthy blues music of his contemporary older style who were being rediscovered at that time (Mississippi John Hurt, Skip James and the like) that appealed simultaneously to the emerging white blues audience, and also (in the guise of "folk blues") to the acoustic folk-based audiences of the day, while the main recipients for Davis' gospel stylings were the small black church communities, not a demographic with particular purchasing power; in addition his somewhat gruff vocals (in contrast to his powerful and complex guitar arrangements) may have been a barrier for some listeners. However his influence on guitarists, via his students and once removed via popularisers such as Ramblin' Jack Elliott, Dave Van Ronk and others, was immense, even if the latter tended to eschew his more complex pieces simply because his full technique was almost impossible for others to master. Since his passing, his legacy and degree of appreciation for what he was able to accomplish musically has grown, due in no small part to the efforts of ex students like Stefan Grossman, Woody Mann and Ernie Hawkins to perpetuate his legacy via release of unpublished recordings and videos, books and manuals of technique, and sets of audio and video lessons that teach his style. Meanwhile, after perhaps a slow start, Davis' recordings now attract full attention in blues compendia alongside recordings by other more "pure blues" artists, with appreciation duly given for the superb musicianship on display; for example in The Penguin Guide to Blues Recordings (2006), Chris Smith writes:

[In his later years] Davis was increasingly prepared to accommodate his new audience by playing secular music ... even if he had stuck exclusively to gospel, this guide would be incomplete without Gary Davis, who developed African-American guitar music into a personal style of unparalleled complexity and brilliance which had a profound influence on more than one generation of musicians.

== Musical style ==
Davis was absolutely without peer in his guitar style in his chosen genre (Piedmont blues and gospel) and also incorporated influences in his playing from marching bands, piano players, and early jazz and ragtime. His only contemporaries that came close to him (or, in some aspects, surpassed him for speed and clarity of picking) were Blind Blake and, possibly, Willie Walker, although so little recorded evidence remains of the latter artist that his abilities are largely based on second hand accounts; in any case, neither of these two players had the stylistic range of Davis or his seemingly effortless ability to utilise the entire range of the guitar and to play with ease in multiple keys.

Already by his earliest (1935) recordings Davis' style seems fully formed. At those sessions he recorded eight songs (including the unissued "Lord, I wish I could See") played in the key of C (a common ragtime guitarists' choice), two in A (a Davis favourite), plus one each in the keys of G, E, and F, the last a very challenging key for the guitarist. While his earliest days of self-teaching remain undocumented, Ernie Hawkins has written: "Davis once told me that he could imitate any guitarist, a skill he developed early-on by learning the latest hits that his hometown record store played through a speaker directed onto the street. By stopping every day with his guitar and working out the songs he heard, he learned almost every song that came out on record. [Editor's note: since no blues guitarists were recorded before 1923 and Davis was apparently plying his trade from around 1917, either this recollection post-dates 1923 or Davis' earliest listening via recordings comprised non- guitar material such as jazz or marching bands, or records featuring solo piano or banjo]. Some of his favorite guitarists from the early days of recording were Blind Blake, Lonnie Johnson, and Blind Willie Johnson. Davis also picked up a lot of music (including songs like "Candy Man") from guitarists employed by traveling medicine shows for their ability to attract a crowd. You might say that he had a "phonographic" memory, but it was one that reached deep into the traditions that preceded him. Davis was a walking encyclopedia of the Piedmont guitar style, a style that enabled him to play any type of music he came across. ... At our lessons Davis would often surprise me with jazz tunes from the 1920s played in flat keys. I learned his version of songs like "Florida Blues" (in G and C) and "Stormy Weather" (in G). F was one of his favorite keys—he used it for the '20s dance hit "Walkin' the Dog" (which was recorded twice by Hoagy Carmichael), the first part of "United States March," some gospel songs, and popular songs like "Darktown Strutter's Ball". As in "Slow Drag," Davis used a unique stride-influenced fingerpicking style that enabled him to work through the changes while moving a bass line as he played a melody or improvised on the treble strings."

In the liner notes to the Yazoo release Reverend Gary Davis 1935-1949 (mis-represented as "1935-1939" on the back cover), Stefan Grossman wrote: "Blues historians tend to classify the guitar style of Reverend Davis as an imitation of Blind Blake's. But this is quite absurd. Blake's technique was limited to his style of music. Davis uses a much more complicated approach to guitar playing which employs rhythmic and linear counter-point behind a sung musical statement. His instrumentals go beyond the ordinary "dance rag" and can depict a marching band, a battle, a broken car or the dreams of the devil. Reverend Davis has also perfected more than one style. He can play in the gentle style of John Hurt [...] or the more primitive bottleneck style or even double thumb frail banjo dance tunes or play carnival style banjo. But his major achievement is developing a guitar style that incorporated more than a syncopated bass or an alternating bass but used a variation of these played against a treble melody that was coupled with a middle registered harmony. ... Many times the thumb plays treble notes [editor's note: the converse of regular guitar playing] to give them the right accent ... He has developed "rolls" that double time the rhythm or accentuate the existing time signature. ... As with many other ragtime guitarists, Reverend Davis tends to favor the key of C. But for him each key has its own individual sound and there are pieces played in A, C, E. F and G on this disc. Davis has the uncanny ability of being able to play proficiently in any key. His most unusual arrangement conceptions are found in those songs placed in the key of F."

Presenting some examples of Davis' style as illustrated by specific songs, Ernie Hawkins initially states:

Piedmont fingerpicking gets its magic by maintaining the integrity of a melody against a rock-steady bass. It can be thought of as a "two-part" style in which the bass alternates on the beat, pumping out the rhythm, while the melody is played on the treble strings. ... This is what Davis called "country picking," and he was a master of it, using just the thumb and index finger (with a plastic thumbpick and fingerpick) of his right hand to play songs like "Cocaine", which he said he learned in 1905 from a troupe of traveling medicine show musicians. One thing that makes "Cocaine" really interesting and adds to its hypnotic feel is the way Davis plays the basses. Though the song is in C, he never plays the low C (fifth string, third fret) itself, but alternates the sixth and fourth string basses through all the chords. ... Davis took this relatively straightforward two-part style and jazzed it up, much as Blind Blake had. Davis admired Blake. He often commented on Blake's "sportin'" right hand and could reproduce many of Blake's 1920s hits (such as "West Coast Blues" and "You Gonna Quit Me Blues") practically note-for-note. Blake's complex signature licks often appear in interesting ways in Davis's blues, rags, and gospel songs. They both loved to run bass and treble lines in opposition to each other, as in bars 3 and 4 of "Let Us Get Together". ... Davis's style, however, was freer, more open than Blake's, a result of his ability to navigate the whole neck effortlessly and improvise multiple voices through the changes, like a jazz player. Also, Blake's playing is very "cool," while Davis's playing, though economic, efficient, and effortless, burns with a spiritual fire full of thunder and lightning. Davis is able to free the bass from a strictly alternating pattern, moving it in lines beneath the melody. In "Slow Drag (Cincinnati Flow Rag)," one of his great rags, the opening bars combine syncopation (what Davis called a New Orleans–type beat) and counterpoint that runs beneath the melody. As the melody descends, G–F#–F–E–D–C, the bass works its way up: G–D–A–D–B–G–D–G–B–C. And notice that instead of just playing the bass notes on the beat, Davis "jumps" the basses, playing them an eighth note early, as in the ends of bars 1 and 5.

There is much more that has been written about Davis' style as exemplified in particular tunes, for which particular tutorials and books should be consulted. Regarding Davis' vocals, Grossman has written: "Davis' singing technique depends on the type of material he is doing. For religious pieces he tends to preach, shout and sing with as much intensity as possible. His blues are marked by interesting guitar arrangements against an almost spoken verse. His carnival show songs tend to have softer guitar arrangements that are used solely as an accompaniment and here his singing is more melodic but never with the intensity of his gospel music."

Perhaps a final account of Davis' style can be given from a description by Woody Mann, contained in his 1973 book Six Black Blues Guitarists, which also discusses the work of Blind Blake, Blind Willie McTell, and others besides Davis. Mann writes:

The music of Gary Davis is so free from any discernible technical limitation that it cannot be placed in any single category. Rather, it synthesizes the very contrasting elements that circumscribe other musicians. His flawless control enabled him to play with seemingly endless improvisation and to perform the same song in four different ways—each suited different moods. Yet his only musical finishing school was the streets of Greenville, South Carolina, where he plied his trade before moving to New York in the 1940's. ... Using the characteristic structure of the religious song (strict four part harmony with moving inner voices), he would add layers of syncopation and embellishing melodic riffs to create a unique potpourri of sounds. He would modulate from key to key on request or play in keys that were unknown to other bluesmen, like F, B-flat, and E-flat. Using two fingers, he attained the complexity of any three finger guitar-picker. ... His guitar and voice were so inter-twined that it was easy to think of them as a single entity, and he himself once said: "...I just play the way I talk.. " [...] His music should be listened to and appreciated as the work of an artist whose craft was perfection.

== Filmed appearances ==
Davis scholars and enthusiasts are fortunate that he lived long enough to be filmed on a number of occasions, generally while in his prime as a performer. Stefan Grossman compiled a 105-minute set of all then known Davis film clips, released as SKU Vestapol 13111 Rev Gary Davis: The Video Collection, covering two tracks taken from the 1964 short film Blind Gary Davis that played in theatres in the early 1960s; two tunes broadcast on Rainbow Quest in 1966; eight tunes filmed for the Seattle Folklore Society in 1969 by the Anthropology Department, followed by another nine shot at a local television station on the same trip; plus two tunes filmed by Lionel Rogosin for his 1970 film Black Roots. Not included here, but available via other sources, are a brief clip from French television recorded in May 1964 when "the Blues & Gospel Caravan" was performing in Paris, and two tracks of better audio and video quality recorded at Newport in 1965 ("Death Don't Have No Mercy", "Twelve Gates to the City") included in the DVD documentary Harlem Street Singer (Acoustic Films, 2014). This documentary also includes some additional, fragmentary silent footage (with semi synchronized audio dubbed from other sources) filmed in Montreal, Canada, in January 1967, as well as informal footage of Davis at home providing advice and instruction for a student.

== Discography ==
Many of Davis' recordings were published posthumously.

Year	Title	Label	Number	Notes
1954	Blind Gary Davis – The Singing Reverend	Stinson	SLP 56	First LP, recorded April 1954, with Sonny Terry, red vinyl
1956	American Street Songs	Riverside	RP 12–611	Side A, Pink Anderson, Carolina Street Ballads; side B, Rev. Gary Davis, Harlem Street Spirituals, recorded January 29, 1956; also released as Gospel, Blues and Street Songs, Riverside RLP 12-148 (1961), Original Blues Classics OBC 524 and OBCCD 524–2
1960	Harlem Street Singer	Bluesville	1015	Recorded August 24, 1960; also Original Blues Classics 547, Fontana 688-303-ZL (UK, 1965); renamed Pure Religion! and reissued as Prestige Folklore 14028 (1964) and Prestige 7805 (1972); remastered and reissued as OBCCD-547-2 (1992); reissued as Fantasy 24704
1961	A Little More Faith	Bluesville	1032	Recorded August 10, 1961, at Van Gelder Studio, EngleWood Cliffs, NJ; also XTRA 5042 (UK, 1967), OBCCD-588-2; reissued as Fantasy 24704
1961	Say No to the Devil	Bluesville	1049	Also XTRA 5014 (UK, 1966) and OBCCD 519–2
1963	Pure Religion and Bad Company	77 (UK)	LA 12/14	Recorded June 1957 in New York City; also Folklyric 125; reissued as Smithsonian Folkways SFW 40035 (1991) with 2 additional cuts
1964	The Guitar & Banjo of Reverend Gary Davis	Prestige Folklore	14033	Instrumental tracks, recorded March 2, 1964, Van Gelder Studio; also Fantasy OBCCD 592–2; reissued as The Blues Guitar and Banjo of Reverend Gary Davis, Prestige 7725
1964	Rev. Gary Davis/Short Stuff Macon	Xtra (UK)	1009	
1964	Pure Religion!	Prestige Folklore	14028	Also Prestige 7805 (1972), reissue of Harlem Street Singer
1967	Rev. Gary Davis at Newport	Vanguard	73008	Recorded 1965
1968	Bring Your Money, Honey	Fontana (UK)	SFJL 914	Recorded Cambridge, Mass.
1970	Reverend Gary Davis 1935–1949	Yazoo	L-1023	Also Yazoo CD 2011 (1994) as The Complete Early Recordings of Rev. Gary Davis and Document DOCD 5060 (UK, 2003) with 2 extra tracks
1971	Ragtime Guitar	Transatlantic (UK)	TRA 244	Recorded 1960–1971; also Kicking Mule 106 (1974), Sonet SNKF 133 (1977) and Heritage HT 309 (UK, 1985)
1971	Children of Zion	Transatlantic (UK)	TRA 249	Recorded 1962, Swarthmore College, Swarthmore, Pa.; also Kicking Mule 101 (1974), Sonet SNKF 152 (1978), Heritage HT 308 (UK, 1985); also on Blues & Ragtime, Shanachie 97024 (1993)
1971	The Legendary Reverend Gary Davis, New Blues and Gospel	Biograph	12030E	Also Blue Moon BMLP 1.040 (c. 1987)
1971	The Legendary Reverend Gary Davis, Blues and Gospel, Vol 2	Biograph	12034E	Recorded March 17, 1971
1972	When I Die I'll Live Again	Fantasy	24704	Reissue of Prestige/Bluesville 1015 and 1032
1973	Lo I Be with You Always	Sonet (Sweden)	SNKD 1	Also Kicking Mule cassette tape (no number, 1984); reissued on Blues & Ragtime, Shanachie 97024 (1993)
1973	O, Glory – The Apostolic Studio Sessions	Adelphi	1008	Final studio album, recorded March 1969; reissued as Genes GCD 9908 (1996) with additional tracks
1973	At the Sign of the Sun	Heritage (UK)	N/K	1962, San Diego, Calif.; also HT CD 03 (UK, 1990)
1974	Let Us Get Together	Sonet (Sweden)	SNKF 103	Also Kicking Mule cassette tape (no number, 1984)
1976	Sun Is Going Down	Folkways	FS 3542	Recorded 1966
1984	I Am a True Vine	Kicking Mule	no number	Cassette tape
1984	Babylon Is Falling	Kicking Mule	no number	Cassette tape
1985	I Am a True Vine	Heritage (UK)	HT 307	Recorded 1962–63, New York City; also HT CD07 (UK, 1991)
1988	Blind Gary Davis	Document (Austria)	DLP 521	Recorded live, spring 1966, at Al Matthes, Toronto
1988	Blind Gary Davis 1962–1964, Recorded Live	Wolf (Austria)	120,915	
1988	Blind Gary Davis at Allegheny College, Meadville, Pa., 1964—Afternoon Workshop	Document (Austria)	DLP 527	
1989	Reverend Gary Davis	Heritage (UK)	CD 02	Reissue of Children of Zion and Ragtime Guitar
1993	Rev. Gary Davis: Blues and Ragtime	Shanachie	97042	
2001	Demons and Angels	Shanachie	CDSH6117	3-CD set compiled by Stefan Grossman
2002	The Sun of Our Life: Solos, Songs, a Sermon 1955–1957	World Arbiter	2005	Previously unissued session tapes and sermon from mid-1950s
2003	If I Had My Way: Early Home Recordings	Folkways	SFW40123	Recorded 1953 by John Cohen
2007	Lifting the Veil: The First Bluesmen (1926–1956), Rev. Gary Davis and Peers	World Arbiter	2008	Unissued session tapes from 1956 to 1957, recorded by Fred Gerlach and Tiny Robinson; liner notes quote a 1951 interview with Davis
2007	Reverend Gary Davis Live: Manchester Free Trade Hall 1964	Document (Austria)	DOCD-32-20-14	Recorded May 8, 1964, Manchester, England
2009	Live at Gerde's Folk City, February 1962	Stefan Grossman's Guitar Workshop	SGGW 114/5/6	3-CD set
2010	Reverend Gary Davis	Field Recorders Collective	FRC116	Recorded 1952, New York City, by John Cohen
2010	At Home And Church: 1962-1967	Stefan Grossman's Guitar Workshop	SGGW 130/1/2	3-CD set, recordings by Stefan Grossman
2020	See What The Lord Has Done For Me	Stefan Grossman's Guitar Workshop	SGGW 161/2/3	3-CD set - rare and unissued recordings by Ernie Hawkins, 1968 and 1970
2022	Let Us Get Together	Sunset Blvd Records	CDSBR7012	2-CD set. CD 1: Live in Portland, OR. CD 2: Live in Seattle, WA

== Recognition ==
While he was alive, Davis' music was recognized by musicians of the era as exceptional. Bob Dylan called him "one of the wizards of modern music," while Bob Weir of the Grateful Dead said Davis had "a Bacchian sense of music which transcended any common notion of a bluesman." Jorma Kaukonen of the Jefferson Airplane suggested Davis is "one of the greatest figures of 20th-century music."

He was posthumously recognized alongside Blind Boy Fuller as Main Honorees by the Sesquicentennial Honors Commission at the Durham 150 Closing Ceremony in Durham, North Carolina, on November 2, 2019. The recognition was bestowed for their contributions to the Piedmont blues.

In 2002, Inside Sounds released a 20-track compilation Gary Davis Style (The Legacy Of Reverend Gary Davis) by a range of artists, a project described by the compiler as "started as an attempt to celebrate the centenary of Rev. Gary Davis's birth" which ended up comprising 20 tracks of which approximately half were previously released, and the remainder at that time previously unrecorded by the contributing artists.

== See also ==
- "Cocaine Blues"
- Gospel blues
