= Kenneth S. Goldstein =

American folklorist, educator and record producer

- Born: March 17, 1927; Brooklyn, New York, United States
- Died: November 11, 1995 (aged 68); Philadelphia, Pennsylvania, United States
- Occupation: Folklorist
- Board member of: Chair, Dept of Folklore and Folklife, University of Pennsylvania
- Spouse: Rochelle Judith Korn
- Children: 5 including Diane and Jah Levi
- Awards: Lindback Foundation Award for Distinguished Teaching

Academic background
- Education: University of Pennsylvania
- Thesis: A Guide for Fieldworkers in Folklore (1963)

Academic work
- Discipline: Folklore, Folk Music
- Institutions: University of Pennsylvania
- Notable students: Peggy Bulger, Henry Glassie, Diane Goldstein, Mick Moloney, Dorothy Noyes, Jack Santino
- Notable works: A Guide for Fieldworkers in Folklore

Kenneth S. Goldstein (March 17, 1927 – November 11, 1995) was an American folklorist, educator and record producer and a "prime mover" in the American Folk Music Revival.

== Early life and education ==
Goldstein was born in Brooklyn to Tillie Horowitz from Riga, Latvia and Irving Martin Goldstein from London, England.

After military service in the US Army, Goldstein earned bachelor's and master's degrees in business administration from the City College of New York in 1949 and 1951 respectively.

== Recordings ==
Whilst working as a statistician for Fairchild Productions, Goldstein developed his interest in folklife and particularly folksong of North American and the British Isles, becoming an important figure in the nascent folk music recording scene. He acted as folk music director for Stinson Records, Folkways Records and Riverside Records, and folk and blues director for Prestige Records. He estimated that by the mid-1950s he was recording 60 albums per year.

In total, he produced and recorded over 500 recordings in the 1950s and 1960s, including recordings by Ewan MacColl and A.L. Lloyd, Jean Ritchie, Reverend Gary Davis, Sara Cleveland, the Clancy Brothers and Tommy Makem. Some of these have been hailed as "milestones" in the histories of their respective genres.

The albums he recorded for Prestige Records (and its subsidiary Bluesville Records) with blues pioneers like Reverend Gary Davis, Lightnin' Hopkins, Sonny Terry, Brownie McGhee, Lead Belly, had a profound effect on American blues and rock and roll.

The Clancy Brothers' albums introduced the guitar and the "ballad-group" sound into mainstream Irish folk music.

Goldstein's recordings of MacColl and Lloyd were among the first English and Scottish albums ever recorded in the US and they opened up a vast new market that transformed the folk scene.

Goldstein's liner notes for many of these albums established him as an expert in folksong.

== Academia ==
Goldstein's interests in folksong and folklore acquired an academic standing in the 1960s. He began a Ph.D. at the University of Pennsylvania, supervised by MacEdward Leach in 1958. Between 1959 and 1960 he was a Fulbright Scholar based at the School of Scottish Studies in Edinburgh. For most of that year, Goldstein was based in Strichen in Aberdeenshire and carried out fieldwork on folksong amongst the Stewarts of Fetterangus.

Goldstein completed his Ph.D. - the first awarded in folklore by the University of Pennsylvania - with a thesis titled A Guide for Fieldworkers in Folklore. Published as his first book in 1964, this work was widely translated and remained the standard text on its subject for decades.

In 1962 Goldstein co-founded of the Philadelphia Folk Festival.

Goldstein went on to teach at the University of Pennsylvania. From 1969, Goldtein served as Co-Chairman (with Don Yoder) of the University's Folklife and Folklore Department. From 1971, Goldstein served as chair of the Department for nearly 20 years. In 1967, Goldstein received the Lindback Foundation Award for Distinguished Teaching.

Between 1976 and 1978 Goldstein acted as Head of Department of Folklore at Memorial University of Newfoundland. During his time in the post he also carried out research into folklore amongst Newfoundland fishing communities.

== Honours and recognition ==
In the 1970s, Goldstein acted as a special assistant on folklore and folklife to the Secretary of the Smithsonian Institution. He was also on the advisory and review panel for the folk arts program of the National Endowment for the Arts. In 1988 he acted as an adviser to the Australian National Folk Trust.

Goldstein held a number of positions within the American Folklore Society, including Secretary-Treasurer from 1965 and 1972 and President between 1975 and 1976. The American Folklore Society has created a scholarship fund in his honour, The Kenneth Goldstein Award for Lifetime Academic Leadership.

Goldstein’s collection of books and records is now housed at the Center for the Study of Southern Culture in Oxford, Mississippi and his collection of American broadsides and country-western folios is housed at the Middle Tennessee State University Center for Popular Music in Murfreesboro, Tennessee.

A festschrift honouring Goldstein's contributions to the field of folklore, titled Fields of Folklore: Essays in Honor of Kenneth Goldstein and edited by Roger Abrahams, was published by Trickster Press in 1995.

== Family ==
He married Rochelle Judith Korn in 1949. She was a partner in his work and together they had five children, including Diane Goldstein, a folk music academic and Jah Levi, a music producer.

== Bibliography ==
- Baggelaar, Kristin and Donald Milton (1976) Folk Music: More Than A Song, p. 147-8, ISBN 0-690-01159-8.
- Baggelaar, Kristin and Donald Milton (1977) The Folk Music Encyclopaedia, p. 147-8, ISBN 0-86001-396-0.
- Carlin, Richard (2007) American Popular Music: Folk, p. 78, ISBN 0-8160-7340-6.
