= Buster Pickens =

American pianist (1916–1964)

- Birth name: Edwin Goodwin Pickens
- Born: June 3, 1916 Hempstead, Texas, US
- Died: November 24, 1964 (aged 48) Houston, Texas, US
- Genres: Blues, piano blues
- Occupation: Pianist
- Instrument: Piano
- Years active: Mid 1930s–1964

Edwin "Buster" Goodwin Pickens (June 3, 1916 – November 24, 1964) was an American pianist. Pickens is best known for his work accompanying Alger "Texas" Alexander and Lightnin' Hopkins. He also recorded a solo album in 1960.

== Life and career ==
Pickens was born in Hempstead, Texas, to Elias "Eli" Pickens (Turnipseed) and Bessie Gage.

In the 1930s, Pickens, along with Robert Shaw and others, was part of the "Santa Fe Group", named after touring musicians utilising the Santa Fe freight trains. From that time, Pickens described people doing the slow drag to "slow low-down dirty blues" in barrelhouse joints.

Following service in the United States Army in World War II, Pickens settled in Houston, Texas. He appeared on his first disc recording on January 13, 1948, providing backing for Perry Cain on his single "All the Way from Texas" backed with "Cry Cry", released by Gold Star Records. Further recording work followed over the next eighteen months, as Pickens played in different sessions as part of the accompaniment to Cain, Bill Hayes, and Goree Carter.

Pickens later accompanied Alger "Texas" Alexander in the latter's final recording session, for Freedom Records in 1950. Later Pickens regularly performed with Lightnin' Hopkins and played on several of Hopkins's albums in the early 1960s, including Walkin' This Road by Myself (1962), Lightnin' and Co. (1962), and Smokes Like Lightning (1963). Pickens had by this time also recorded his own debut solo album, Buster Pickens (1960), and appeared in the 1962 film The Blues.

Pickens was shot dead by his cousin after an argument in a bar in Houston, in November 1964.

== Discography ==
- Buster Pickens (1960), Heritage Records

The album, recorded in Houston by Chris Strachwitz, Mack McCormick and Paul Oliver, contained "Santa Fe Train" / "Rock Island Blues" / "Ain't Nobody's Business" / "Colorado Springs Blues" / "She Caught the L & N" / "Remember Me" / "Women in Chicago" / "The Ma Grinder, No. 2" / "You Better Stop Your Woman (From Ticklin' Me Under the Chin)" / "Jim Nappy" / "Mountain Jack" / "D.B.A. Blues" / "Hattie Green" / "Backdoor Blues" / "Santa Fe Blues".

- With Lightnin' Hopkins
- Walkin' This Road by Myself (Bluesville, 1962)
- Lightnin' and Co. (Bluesville, 1962) - five tracks
- Smokes Like Lightning (Bluesville, 1963) - one track

== Quotations ==
I rode freight trains practically all over the country. Just wherever it was booming, I'd hear about it.

— Buster Pickens

== See also ==
- List of blues musicians
- List of Texas blues musicians
