= Early Recordings =

Early Recordings may refer to:

- Early Recordings (Joan Osborne album), 1996
- Early Recordings (Lightnin' Hopkins album), 1965
  - Early Recordings Vol. 2, Lightnin' Hopkins album, 1971
- Early Recordings (My Morning Jacket album series), a 2004 indie pop album series
- Early Recordings (Quasi album), a 1996 indie album
- Early Recordings (Uncle Dave Macon album), a 2001 country album
- Return to Eden, Vol. 1: The Early Recordings, a 2002 alternative rock album by All About Eve
- Early Recordings, 2016 compilation album by Martha Argerich
