= Too Many Drivers =

1939 blues song by Big Bill Broonzy

Single by Big Bill Broonzy
- B-side: "Preachin' the Blues"
- Recorded: Chicago, May 11, 1939
- Genre: Blues
- Length: 2:34
- Label: Vocalion
- Songwriter: Big Bill Broonzy

"Too Many Drivers" is a blues song recorded by Big Bill Broonzy in 1939. It is performed in an acoustic ensemble-style of early Chicago blues and the lyrics use double entendre often found in hokum-style blues songs. The song has been identified as one of Broonzy's more popular tunes and has been recorded over the years by a variety of artists, who often who use alternate titles, such as "Little Car Blues", "Little Side Car", "Automobile Blues", and "Let Me Ride Your Little Automobile".

== Original song ==
Broonzy, who was one of the most popular pre-World War II blues artists, used elements of hokum in his music. In "Too Many Drivers", he makes use of double entendre and "further extended the 'female as automobile' metaphor so prevalent in blues lyrics" at the time, according to compilation annotator Keith Briggs. The lyrics include:

Oh, baby—you should take care of your little automobile
Now, you've got a pretty little car, baby
But you let too many get to the wheel

The recording session took place on May 11, 1939, in Chicago. Broonzy, on vocal and guitar, is accompanied by Joshua Altheimer on piano, and Ransom Knowling on bass, and Odell Rand on clarinet.

Vocalion Records issued the song on the then-standard 78 rpm 10-inch record format with the description "Blues Singer with Hot Instrumental Acc[ompaniment]". Although it does not list a songwriter, a copyright entry in 1948 shows "Willie Broonzy" as the composer. "Preachin' the Blues" is used for the second side and, as with many of his early records, the artist is listed as "Big Bill". "Too Many Drivers" has been identified as one of Broonzy's "more notable numbers"; it is included on several anthologies of his early work, such as Good Time Tonight (Columbia Records, 1990), Complete Recorded Works, Vol. 9 (1939) (1992, Document Records), and Warm, Witty, and Wise (Columbia/Legacy Recordings, 1998).

== Legacy ==
Several blues artists associated with Texas blues have recorded "Too Many Drivers", which led to it being referred to as a "Texas blues standard". In 1947, Smokey Hogg recorded the song for Modern Records. After years of releases by various labels, it became his breakthrough record. Hogg's single did not reach the national charts, but it sold well in Texas, where its distribution was widespread. Modern listed Hogg as the songwriter and Broonzy, who was in Texas at the time, took notice: "I went and stayed with him [Hogg] for about two months. He had a nice little wife—and when I left he didn't owe me anything." When Modern later reissued the record, it used "Little Car Blues" as the title, but omitted the songwriter credit. (Note: A 1971 copyright entry shows "'Too Many Drivers'; w & m [words and music] Jules Taub, pseud.[pseudonym] of Jules Bihari". The Bihari brothers owned Modern Records and frequently added their pseudonyms to song copyright filings to generate more income.)

Texas bluesman Lightnin' Hopkins recorded the tune with somewhat different lyrics as "Automobile" in 1949 for Gold Star Records. It was subsequently issued by Jax Records as "Automobile Blues", which is the title used for his 1960 re-recording of the song. Several Hopkins compilations include the song, such as Early Recordings (1965, Arhoolie Records) and Mojo Hand: The Anthology (1993, Rhino Entertainment). Soul Blues, an album released by Prestige Records in 1966, uses the title "Too Many Drivers". Bob Dylan biographers identify Hopkins' "Automobile Blues" as the inspiration for "Leopard-Skin Pill-Box Hat", which appears on Blonde on Blonde (1966). Author Douglas Mark Ponton writes, "The Dylan version drops the automobile motif in favour of an item that never featured in any black blues song, and includes surreal linguistic inventions that evoke the world of Picasso more than that of the Mississippi Delta."

In 1951, the Larks, a rhythm and blues vocal group, recorded the song as "Little Side Car" for Apollo. On October 6, the single entered Billboard magazine's "Best Selling Retail Rhythm and Blues Records" chart, where it reached number 10. The same year, blues pianist and singer Willie Love recorded it as "Little Car Blues" for Trumpet Records. A review in Billboard included, "The Mississippi diskery [Trumpet] has a potent shouter in Love, whose style is crudely crossed between [Big] Joe Turner's and Fats Waller's." A historical account of Trumpet Records notes "'Little Car Blues', which derived from a much earlier Big Bill Broonzy release for [Vocalion parent company] ARC ... captured perfectly the raucous mood of the jukes."

In 1953, Swing Time Records issued Lowell Fulson's take on the song, titled "Let Me Ride Your Little Automobile". A Billboard reviewer gave the song a rating of 73 out of 100 and wrote, "Fulson should get some action with his new twist on the same old idea. His chanting is planned to give the lyrics all the intention." In 1964, he re-recorded the song for Kent Records as "Too Many Drivers". Kent included the song on Fulson's 1966 album Soul and it appears on several compilation albums. Although neither of Fulson's singles reached the charts, he has been acknowledged as popularizing the song.

Paul Butterfield recorded "Too Many Drivers" for the second album by his group Better Days. Although an AllMusic reviewer characterizes the album's sound as "a bit more laid back", Butterfield's version is described as "a churning Chicago blues, with Butterfield's horn impressions figuring as intensely as ever, that would have fit in perfectly with anything on his old band's debut."

== Sources ==
- Govenar, Alan (2010). Lightnin' Hopkins: His Life and Blues. Chicago Review Press. ISBN 978-1-55652-962-7.
- Herzhaft, Gerard (1992). "Too Many Drivers". Encyclopedia of the Blues. Fayetteville, Arkansas: University of Arkansas Press. ISBN 1-55728-252-8.
- House, Roger (2010). Blue Smoke: The Recorded Journey of Big Bill Broonzy. Baton Rouge, Louisiana: Louisiana State University Press. ISBN 978-0-8071-3720-8.
- James, Steve (2003). "Big Bill Broonzy". In Bogdanov, Vladimir; Woodstra, Chris; Erlewine, Stephen Thomas (eds.). All Music Guide to the Blues (3rd. ed.). San Francisco, California: Backbeat Books. ISBN 0-87930-736-6.
- Larkin, Colin (2013). "Hogg, Smokey". The Virgin Encyclopedia of the Blues. Random House. ISBN 978-1-4481-3274-4.
- Marqusee, Mike (2005). Wicked Messenger. New York City: Seven Stories Press. ISBN 978-1-58322-686-5.
- Oliver, Paul; McCormick, Mack (2019). Govenar, Alan (ed.). The Blues Come to Texas: Paul Oliver and Mack McCormick's Unfinished Book. College Station, Texas: Texas A&M University Press. ISBN 978-1623496395.
- Poe, Randy (2003). Squeeze My Lemon: A Collection of Classic Blues Lyrics. Milwaukee, Wisconsin: Hal Leonard.
- Ponton, Douglas Mark (2020). Blues in the 21st Century: Myth, Self-Expression and Trans-Culturalism. Wilmington, Delaware: Vernon Press. ISBN 978-1-62273-634-8.
- Ryan, Marc W. (2004). Trumpet Records: Diamonds on Farish Street. Jackson, Mississippi: University Press of Mississippi. ISBN 1-57806-606-9.
- Simon, Larry (2021). Broven, John (ed.). New York City Blues: Postwar Portraits from Harlem to the Village and Beyond. Jackson, Mississippi: University Press of Mississippi. ISBN 978-1-4968-3474-4.
- Whitburn, Joel (1988). Top R&B Singles 1942–1988. Record Research. ISBN 978-0-89820-068-3.
