= Walkin' This Road by Myself =

Studio album by Lightnin' Hopkins
- Released: 1962
- Recorded: July 7, 1961, and February 17 & 20, 1962
- Studio: Gold Star (Houston, Texas)
- Genre: Blues
- Length: 38:31
- Label: Bluesville; BVLP 1057
- Producer: Mack McCormick, Kenneth S. Goldstein

Lightnin' Hopkins chronology
Lightnin' Sam Hopkins (1962)	Walkin' This Road by Myself (1962)	Lightnin' and Co. (1962)

Walkin' This Road by Myself is an album by the blues musician Lightnin' Hopkins, recorded in Texas and released on the Bluesville label.

== Reception ==
Professional ratings
Review scores
Source	Rating
AllMusic	3/5 stars
The Penguin Guide to Blues Recordings	2.5/4 stars

The Penguin Guide to Blues Recordings wrote: "This album is notable for 'Happy Blues for John Glenn', inspired by media reports of the astronauts successful return to earth from his orbital flight in Friendship 7. The song is not outstanding by Lightnin's standards but it reminds us of one of the reasons why he was an outstanding bluesman".

== Track listing ==
All compositions by Sam "Lightnin'" Hopkins except where noted

1. "Walkin' This Road by Myself" – 4:50
2. "Black Gal" – 4:08
3. "How Many More Years I Got to Let You Dog Me Around" – 2:59
4. "Baby Don't You Tear My Clothes" – 2:53
5. "Worried Life Blues" – 3:46
6. "Happy Blues for John Glenn" – 5:21
7. "Good Morning Little School Girl" (Traditional) – 3:06
8. "The Devil Jumped the Black Man" – 4:11
9. "Coffee Blues" – 3:39
10. "Black Cadillac" – 3:38
- Recorded at ACA Studios (Gold Star Studios), Houston, TX on July 7, 1961 (tracks 2, 4, 7 & 9) and February 17, 1962 (tracks 1, 3, 8 & 10) and February 20, 1962 (tracks 5 & 6)

== Personnel ==
=== Performance ===
- Lightnin' Hopkins – guitar, vocals
- Billy Bizor – harmonica, vocals (tracks 1, 3, 8 & 10)
- Buster Pickens – piano (tracks 5 & 6)
- Donald Cooks – bass (tracks 5 & 6)
- Spider Kilpatrick – drums (tracks 1, 3, 5, 6, 8 & 10)

=== Production ===
- Mack McCormick, Kenneth S. Goldstein – producer
