= My Life in the Blues =

Studio album by Lightnin' Hopkins
- Released: 1965
- Recorded: December 2, 1964
- Studio: Van Gelder Studio, Englewood Cliffs, NJ
- Genre: Blues
- Length: 64:26
- Label: Prestige; PR 7370
- Producer: Samuel Charters

Lightnin' Hopkins chronology
| Lightning Hopkins with His Brothers Joel and John Henry / with Barbara Dane (1966) | My Life in the Blues (1965) | The King of the Blues (1965) |

My Life in the Blues is an album by the blues musician Lightnin' Hopkins, recorded in late 1964 and released on the Prestige label the following year. The album contains Hopkins' performances interspersed with an interview conducted by Samuel Charters.

== Reception ==
Professional ratings
Review scores
| Source | Rating |
|---|---|
| AllMusic | 3/5 stars |
| The Penguin Guide to Blues Recordings | 3/4 stars |

The Penguin Guide to Blues Recordings wrote that the album "contains half a dozen unremarkable performances taped at what sounds like a noisy party, and eight far more interesting passages of reminiscence in which Lightnin' describes his family, learning to play guitar, meeting Texas Alexander, making records and other topics". AllMusic's Ritchie Unterberger reviewed Straight Blues, which collected the six songs from the project, calling them: "typical Hopkins' performances, incorporating both narrative folky tunes with spoken introductions, and livelier boogies".

== Track listing ==
All compositions by Sam "Lightnin'" Hopkins

1. I Growed Up with the Blues – 5:06
2. "I Don't Want to Do Nothing to You" – 2:30
3. My Family – 4:25
4. "You Is One Black Rat" – 3:05
5. I Learn About the Blues – 6:20
6. "Got Nowhere to Lay My Head" – 6:25
7. I First Come into Houston – 3:25
8. "Just Boogyin'" – 2:15
9. I Meet Texas Alexander – 5:15
10. "Take Me Back" – 2:05
11. They Was Hard Times – 6:10
12. I Make My First Record and Get My Name – 6:35
13. My Thoughts on the Blues – 5:30
14. "I Was Down on Dowling Street" – 5:10

== Personnel ==
=== Performance ===
- Lightnin' Hopkins – guitar, vocals, narration

=== Production ===
- Samuel Charters – producer
- Rudy Van Gelder – engineer
