= Smokes Like Lightning =

Studio album by Lightnin' Hopkins
- Released: 1963
- Recorded: January and February 17 & 20, 1962
- Studio: Gold Star (Houston, Texas)
- Genre: Blues
- Length: 36:24
- Label: Bluesville; BVLP 1070
- Producer: Mack McCormick

Lightnin' Hopkins chronology
Lightnin' and Co. (1962)	Smokes Like Lightning (1963)	Lightnin' Strikes (1962)

Smokes Like Lightning is an album by the blues musician Lightnin' Hopkins, recorded in Texas in 1962 and released on the Bluesville label the following year.

== Reception ==
Professional ratings
Review scores
Source	Rating
AllMusic	2.5/5 stars
The Penguin Guide to Blues Recordings	3/4 stars

AllMusic reviewer Greg Adams stated: " A brief and uneven album, Smokes Like Lightnin' is less compelling than Hopkins' '50s recordings, but strikes an appealingly lazy acoustic groove". The Penguin Guide to Blues Recordings said "the quality of Lightnin's performances is variable".

== Track listing ==
All compositions by Sam "Lightnin'" Hopkins

1. "T-Model Blues" – 2:46
2. "Jackstropper Blues" – 3:22
3. "You Cook All Right" – 4:15
4. "My Black Name" – 3:56
5. "You Never Miss Your Water" – 2:36
6. "Let's Do the Susie-Q" – 3:39
7. "Ida Mae" – 5:26
8. "Smokes Like Lightning" – 5:13
9. "Prison Farm Blues" – 4:30

== Personnel ==
=== Performance ===
- Lightnin' Hopkins – guitar, vocals
- Billy Bizor – harmonica, vocals (tracks 4 & 7)
- Buster Pickens – piano (track 9)
- Donald Cooks – bass (track 9)
- Spider Kilpatrick – drums (tracks 4, 7 & 9)

=== Production ===
- Mack McCormick – supervision
