= Autobiography in Blues =

Studio album by Lightnin' Hopkins
- Released: 1960
- Recorded: February 16 & 26, 1959
- Studio: Houston, TX
- Genre: Blues
- Length: 43:33
- Label: Tradition; TLP 1040
- Producer: Mack McCormick

Lightnin' Hopkins chronology
Country Blues (1959)	Autobiography in Blues (1960)	Down South Summit Meetin' (1960)

Autobiography in Blues is an album by the blues musician Lightnin' Hopkins, recorded in 1959 and released on the Tradition label the following year.

== Reception ==
Professional ratings
Review scores
Source	Rating
AllMusic	3/5 stars
The Penguin Guide to Blues Recordings	3/4 stars
DownBeat	5/5 stars

AllMusic stated: "Not having recorded commercially for several years, Lightnin' was in serious mood, resulting in a set of masterful performances that carried more weight than his later, frequently arbitrary sessions". The Penguin Guide to Blues Recordings awarded the album 3 stars, calling it a "satisfying example of Lightnin' in a private setting" and noting that "the recording lends warmth to both voice and acoustic guitar".

DownBeat reviewer Pete Welding awarded the album 5 stars. He wrote that the album, "has the ring of utter truth, and the validity of its message is immediately apparent to listeners from every disparate cultural background — not just the background that produced the music".

== Track listing ==
All compositions by Sam "Lightnin'" Hopkins and Mack McCormick except where noted

1. "In the Evening, the Sun Is Going Down" – 4:13
2. "Trouble in Mind" (Richard M. Jones) – 2:53
3. "Mama and Papa Hopkins" – 4:42
4. "The Foot Race Is On" – 2:42
5. "That Gambling Life" – 4:52
6. "When the Saints Go Marching In" (Traditional) – 2:44
7. "Get off My Toe" – 4:59
8. "75 Highway" – 4:10
9. "Bottle It up and Go" – 3:42
10. "Short Haired Woman" – 3:38
11. "So Long Baby" – 1:47
12. "Santa Fe Blues" – 3:11

== Personnel ==
=== Performance ===
- Lightnin' Hopkins – guitar, vocals

=== Production ===
- Mack McCormick – supervision, engineer
