= Lightnin' and Co. =

Studio album by Lightnin' Hopkins
- Released: 1962
- Recorded: February 17 & 20, 1962
- Studio: Gold Star (Houston, Texas)
- Genre: Blues
- Length: 36:35
- Label: Bluesville; BVLP 1061
- Producer: Mack McCormick, Kenneth S. Goldstein

Lightnin' Hopkins chronology
Walkin' This Road by Myself (1962)	Lightnin' and Co. (1962)	Smokes Like Lightning (1963)

Lightnin' and Co. is an album by the blues musician Lightnin' Hopkins, recorded in Texas in 1962 and released on the Bluesville label. The album was reissued in 1981 on Fantasy Records as a double LP compilation titled How Many More Years I Got, with additional tracks from the sessions.

== Reception ==
Professional ratings
Review scores
Source	Rating
AllMusic	2.5/5 stars
The Penguin Guide to Blues Recordings	2.5/4 stars

AllMusic reviewer Nathan Bush stated: "The players here are extremely loose, betraying a casual interest in the task at hand. They sound like a group of borrowed session men, but were in fact a small combo familiar both with each other and Hopkins himself. ... Hopkins was apparently reluctant to do second takes, however, and these recordings show it. ... the performances hardly approach the level of Hopkins' solo sides from the period, let alone his best work".

The Penguin Guide to Blues Recordings wrote that the album "break[s] away from the guitar-only format and on several tracks call in friends like Pickens (playing on what would be his last session)".

== Track listing ==
All compositions by Sam "Lightnin'" Hopkins except where noted

1. "Sinner's Prayer" – 3:45
2. "Angel Child" – 3:30
3. "The Fox Chase" – 3:18
4. "I Got a Leak in This Old Building" – 5:19
5. "You Is One Black Rat" – 2:29
6. "My Baby Don't Stand No Cheating" (Willie Dixon) – 2:05
7. "Pneumonia Blues" (Blind Lemon Jefferson) – 3:30
8. "Mama Blues" – 5:16
9. "Mojo Hand" – 3:19
10. "Have You Ever Been Mistreated" (Eddie Boyd) – 4:04
- Recorded at ACA Studio, Houston, TX, on February 17, 1962 (tracks 3, 5, 6, 8 & 9) and February 20, 1962 (tracks 1, 2, 4, 7 & 10)

== Personnel ==
=== Performance ===
- Lightnin' Hopkins – guitar, vocals
- Billy Bizor – harmonica, vocals (tracks 3, 5, 6, 8 & 9)
- Buster Pickens – piano (tracks 1, 2, 4, 7 & 10)
- Donald Cooks – bass (tracks 1, 2, 4, 7 & 10)
- Spider Kilpatrick – drums

=== Production ===
- Mack McCormick, Kenneth S. Goldstein – producer
