= Lightnin' Hopkins (album) =

Studio album by Lightnin' Hopkins
- Released: 1959
- Recorded: January 16, 1959
- Studio: 2803 Hadley St., Houston, Texas
- Genre: Blues
- Length: 30:55
- Label: Folkways; FS3822
- Producer: Samuel Charters

Lightnin' Hopkins chronology
Lightnin' and the Blues (1960)	Lightnin' Hopkins (1959)	Country Blues (1959)

Lightnin' Hopkins (re-released as The Roots of Lightnin' Hopkins) is an album by blues musician Lightnin' Hopkins, recorded in 1959 and released on the Folkways label. The album was first released around the time that the book The Country Blues came out and was an instant success. It gave Hopkin's career a new lease on life.

== Reception ==
Professional ratings
Review scores
Source	Rating
AllMusic	5/5 stars
The Penguin Guide to Blues Recordings	3/4 stars
Record Mirror	3/5 stars

AllMusic reviewer Thom Owens stated: "Upon its initial release, it was a pivotal part of the blues revival and helped re-spark interest in Hopkins. Before it was recorded, the bluesman had disappeared from sight; after a great deal of searching, Sam Charters found Hopkins in a rented one-room apartment in Houston. Persuading Lightnin' with a bottle of gin, Charters convinced Hopkins to record ten songs in that room, using only one microphone. The resulting record was one of the greatest albums in Hopkins' catalog, a skeletal record that is absolutely naked in its loneliness and haunting in its despair. These unvarnished performances arguably capture the essence of Lightnin' Hopkins better than any of his other recordings, and it is certainly one of the landmarks of the late-'50s/early-'60s blues revival". The Penguin Guide to Blues Recordings awarded the album three stars stating "'Exciting' may not be the word everyone would choose to describe this intimate, unplugged performance, but it was greeted on its original release with considerable enthusiasm, a response moulded by interpretation of the blues as folk music, suspicion of electric guitars, and other views current in the '50s and '60s among the sort of people who bought Folkways albums. It remains an estimable record".

== Re-release ==
The Roots of Lightnin' Hopkins

The album was released in the UK by Verve Folkways as VLP 5003 (mono) and SVLP 5003 (stereo) in 1965 as The Roots of Lightnin' Hopkins and re-released in 1972 by Transatlantic Records (XTRA 1127). In 1990, it was re-released on CD under the title Lightnin' Hopkins by Smithsonian/Folkways (SF 40019), and distributed by Rounder Records. The CD was produced by Matt Walters, remastered by Doug Sax and Alan Yoshida at The Mastering Lab in Hollywood, California, and printed in Canada. As cover design the original Folkways LP's artwork by Ronald Clyne with a photograph taken by Samuel B. Charters was used. Charters also wrote the sleeve notes for the CD at the Mansfield Centre, Conn. 1990.

== Track listing ==
All compositions by Sam "Lightnin'" Hopkins except where noted

1. "Penitentiary Blues" (Traditional) – 2:45
2. "Bad Luck and Trouble" (Hopkins, Mack McCormick) – 3:40
3. "Come Go Home With Me" (Hopkins, McCormick) – 3:45
4. "Trouble Stay 'Way from My Door" – 4:00
5. "See That My Grave Is Kept Clean" (Blind Lemon Jefferson) – 2:05
6. "Goin' Back to Florida" – 3:10
7. "Reminiscenses of Blind Lemon" – 2:10
8. "Fan It" – 2:40
9. "Tell Me, Baby" – 2:30
10. "She's Mine" – 4:10

== Personnel ==
=== Performance ===
- Lightnin' Hopkins – guitar, vocals

=== Production ===
- Samuel Charters – supervision, engineer
