= John T. Smith =

John T. Smith may refer to:

- J. T. Smith (wrestler) (born 1967), American retired professional wrestler
- John T. Smith (congressman) (1801–1864), U.S. Representative from Pennsylvania
- J. T. Smith (musician) (1896–1940), Texas blues musician

== See also ==
- John Smith (disambiguation)
