= Po' Lightnin' =

Compilation album by Lightnin' Hopkins
- Released: 1983
- Recorded: November 26, 1961, and May 20, 1969 (Original LP)
- Studio: Sierra Sound Laboratories, Berkeley, CA
- Genre: Blues
- Length: 40:37 (Original LP)
- Label: Arhooolie; 1087
- Producer: Chris Strachwitz

Lightnin' Hopkins chronology
Lightning Hopkins in Berkeley (1972)	Po' Lightnin' (1983)	The Legacy of the Blues Vol. 12 (1974)

CD Reissue Cover

Po' Lightnin' is an album by blues musician Lightnin' Hopkins recorded in California in 1969 (with two tracks from 1961) and originally released on the Arhoolie label in 1983.

The original LP featured tracks which were first released as Lightnin'! by Poppy Records in 1969. The label failed to meet the terms of its agreement and a legal dispute ensued. By 1982, a California court ruled that all rights should revert to Hopkins, and Strachwitz released eight tracks from the sessions, along with two unreleased tracks from the 1961 Lightnin' Sam Hopkins sessions on Arhoolie as Po' Lightnin' in 1983.

In 1993 Arhoolie, through Smithsonian Folkways, reissued the 1969 Lightnin'! recordings on CD and then, confusingly, in 1995 released a CD compilation titled Po' Lightnin' which included tracks from the Arhoolie albums; Lightnin' Sam Hopkins, Lightning Hopkins in Berkeley and other blues compilations along with four previously unreleased recordings.

== Reception ==
Professional ratings
Review scores
Source	Rating
AllMusic	3/5 stars

AllMusic's Jason Ankeny reviewed the CD compilation and stated: "On these recordings cut between 1961 and 1969, Lightnin' Hopkins exhibits the full scope of his music".

== Track listing ==
All compositions by Sam "Lightnin'" Hopkins except where noted

=== Original LP (1983) ===
1. "Mojo Hand" – 3:00 Originally released on Lightnin'!
2. "Rock Me Baby" – 3:27 Originally released on Lightnin'!
3. "Hello Central" – 4:32 Originally released on Lightnin'!
4. "Ain't It Crazy" – 2:27 Originally released on Lightnin'!
5. "Candy Kitchen" – 4:55
6. "My Starter Won't Start This Morning" – 3:10 Originally released on Lightnin'!
7. "One Kind Favor I Ask of You" – 4:25 Originally released on Lightnin'!
8. "Little Girl" – 6:00 Originally released on Lightnin'!
9. "Baby, Please Don't Go" (Traditional) – 2:55 Originally released on Lightnin'!
10. "My Baby's Gone" – 4:25
- Recorded at Sierra Sound Laboratories, Berkeley CA on November 26, 1961 (tracks 5 & 10) and May 20, 1969 (tracks 1–4 & 6–9)

=== CD Reissue (1993) ===
1. "Ice Storm Blues" – 7:15 Originally released on Lightnin' Sam Hopkins
2. "Speedin' Boogie" – 3:05 Originally released on Lightnin' Sam Hopkins
3. "Wine Drinking Woman" – 4:50 Originally released on Blues n' Trouble Volume 2
4. "Do the Boogie" – 1:45 Originally released on Lightnin' Sam Hopkins
5. "My Baby's Gone" – 4:30 Originally released on the 1983 LP
6. "Wake Up Old Maid" – 2:24
7. "Jesus, Will You Come by Here" – 2:20
8. "Candy Kitchen" – 4:55 Originally released on the 1983 LP
9. "Gin Bottle Blues" – 3:33
10. "Hurricanes Carla and Esther" – 5:06 Originally released on Texas Blues Volume 2
11. "Wipe Your Feet on the Floor" – 2:30 Originally released on Lightning Hopkins in Berkeley
12. "Please Settle in Vietnam" – 4:10 Originally released on Lightning Hopkins in Berkeley
13. "Up on Telegraph Avenue" – 3:10 Originally released on Lightning Hopkins in Berkeley
14. "California Showers" – 7:35 Originally released on Lightnin' Sam Hopkins
15. "Burnin' in L.A." – 4:25 Originally released on Lightnin' Sam Hopkins
16. "Selling Wine in Arizona" – 3:00 Originally released on Lightning Hopkins in Berkeley
17. "Brand New Lock" – 3:10 Originally released on Lightning Hopkins in Berkeley
18. "I'm Leaving You Now" – 3:04
19. "Goin' Out Number" – 3:00 Originally released on Lightnin' Sam Hopkins
- Recorded at Sierra Sound Laboratories, Berkeley CA on November 26, 1961 (tracks 2–8, 10, 15 & 19), at Chris Strachwitz' Apartment, Berkeley in November 1961 (track 14), at ACA Studios in Houston, Texas on January 23, 1962 (track 1), and at Chris Strachwitz' Apartment, Berkeley in November 1961 (track 14), December 18, 1967 (tracks 9 & 18) and December 8, 1969 (tracks 11–13, 16 & 17)

== Personnel ==
=== Performance ===
- Lightnin' Hopkins – electric guitar, vocals, piano, organ

Additional musicians on some tracks:

- Jeff Carp – harmonica (LP track 2)
- Paul Asbell – guitar (LP track 2)
- Moose Walker – piano (LP track 2)
- Gino Landry – bass (CD tracks 2–8, 10, 15 & 19)
- Geno Skaggs – bass (LP track 2)
- Francis Clay (LP), Victor Leonard (CD tracks 2–8, 10, 15 & 19) or Spider Kilpatrick (CD track 1) – drums

=== Production ===
- Chris Strachwitz – producer
