= Country Blues =

Studio album by Lightnin' Hopkins
- Released: 1959
- Recorded: February 16 & 26, 1959
- Studio: Houston, TX
- Genre: Blues
- Length: 42:07
- Label: Tradition; TLP 1035
- Producer: Mack McCormick

Lightnin' Hopkins chronology
Lightnin' Hopkins (1959)	Country Blues (1959)	Autobiography in Blues (1960)

Country Blues is an album by the blues musician Lightnin' Hopkins, recorded in 1959 and released on the Tradition label.

== Reception ==
Professional ratings
Review scores
Source	Rating
AllMusic	3/5 stars
The Penguin Guide to Blues Recordings	3/4 stars

AllMusic reviewer Cub Koda stated: "In 1959, armed with nothing more than a single microphone mono tape recorder, folklorist Mack McCormick recorded Hopkins in an informal setting in hopes of catching some rough-edged performances that he felt were lacking from the bluesman's then-recent studio efforts. That he succeeded mightily is evidenced in this 15-song collection, almost casual in the way Lightnin' tosses off themes, lyrics, and emotion in a most cavalier fashion. ... here is Lightnin' truly in his element, playing for his friends and his own enjoyment, minus the commercial overlay of the times or the imposed 'folk blues' posturing of his later acoustic recordings. Not the place to start, but a real good place to visit along the way". The Penguin Guide to Blues Recordings awarded the album 3 stars, calling it a "satisfying example of Lightnin' in a private setting" and noting "the recording lends warmth to both voice and acoustic guitar".

== Track listing ==
All compositions by Sam "Lightnin'" Hopkins except where noted

1. "Long Time" – 1:36
2. "Rainy Day Blues" – 3:06
3. "Baby!" – 3:05
4. "Long Gone Like a Turkey Through the Corn" – 3:41
5. "Prison Blues Come Down on Me" – 3:24
6. "Backwater Blues (That Mean Old Twister)" – 2:45
7. "Gonna Pull a Party" – 3:38
8. "Bluebird, Bluebird" – 1:29
9. "See See Rider" (Ma Rainey) – 3:10
10. "Worrying My Mind" – 3:27
11. "Til the Gin Gets Here" – 1:02
12. "Bunion Stew" – 1:55
13. "You Got to Work to Get Your Pay" – 2:30
14. "Go Down Old Hannah" – 3:30
15. "Hear My Black Dog Bark" – 3:49

== Personnel ==
=== Performance ===
- Lightnin' Hopkins – guitar, vocals
- Luke 'Long Gone' Miles – vocal assistance (tracks 3 & 5)

=== Production ===
- Mack McCormick – supervision, engineer
