= Frankie Lee Sims =

American blues singer-songwriter and guitarist (1917–1970)

- Born: April 30, 1917; New Orleans, Louisiana, United States
- Died: May 10, 1970 (aged 53) Dallas, Texas, United States
- Genres: Texas blues, electric blues
- Occupations: Guitarist, songwriter
- Instrument: Guitar
- Years active: 1948–1970
- Labels: Specialty, Ace

Frankie Lee Sims (April 30, 1917 – May 10, 1970) was an American singer-songwriter and electric blues guitarist. He released nine singles during his career, one of which, "Lucy Mae Blues" (1953), was a regional hit. Two compilation albums of his work were released posthumously.

Sims was the cousin of another Texas blues musician, Lightnin' Hopkins, and he worked with several other prominent blues musicians, including Texas Alexander, T-Bone Walker, King Curtis and Albert Collins. Sims is regarded as an important figure in postwar Texas country blues.

== Biography ==
Sims was born on April 30, 1917, in New Orleans, Louisiana, to Henry Sims and Virginia Summuel. He claimed he was born on February 29, 1906, but 1906 was not a leap year, and April 30, 1917, is generally accepted as his birth date. He was the nephew of the Texas blues singer Texas Alexander and the cousin of the guitarist Lightnin' Hopkins. Both Sims's parents were "accomplished guitarists". His family moved to Marshall, Texas, in the late 1920s. At the age of 12 he learned to play the guitar from the blues musician Little Hat Jones and ran away from home to work as a musician. In the late 1930s Sims had a dual career as a teacher in Palestine, Texas, on weekdays and a guitarist at local dances and parties on weekends. When the United States entered the Second World War at the end of 1941, he enlisted and served in the Marine Corps for three years. After the war Sims made Dallas, Texas, his home, where he pursued a full-time career in music.

In Dallas, Sims performed in clubs with the blues guitarists T-Bone Walker and Smokey Hogg. In 1948 he recorded two singles for Blue Bonnet Records, but his first success came in 1953 when he recorded his song "Lucy Mae Blues" for Art Rupe's Specialty Records, which was a regional hit. The Encyclopedia of the Blues called "Lucy Mae Blues" a "masterpiece of rhythm and good humor". Sims continued recording songs for Specialty through the mid-1950s, many of them not released at the time. In 1957 he moved to Johnny Vincent's Ace Records and recorded several songs, including "Walking with Frankie" and "She Likes to Boogie Real Low", which AllMusic called "mighty rockers". Members of his band in 1957 were Willie Taylor (piano), Jack White (tenor saxophone), Ralph Morgan (bass), and Jimmy "Mercy Baby" Mullins (drums). Sims also recorded with other blues musicians, including his cousin Hopkins, and performed on several of their records. In the early 1960s Hopkins took advantage of the folk blues revival, but Sims faded into obscurity.

In 1969 the blues historian Chris Strachwitz located Sims to record him for his Arhoolie label. Sims died soon after, on May 10, 1970, in Dallas, Texas, at the age of 53. The cause of death was pneumonia brought on by poor health. At the time of his death he was reported to have had a drinking problem and was under investigation regarding a "shooting incident". Soon after his death, Specialty Records released Lucy Mae Blues, a compilation album of his recordings with the label. In 1985 Krazy Kat released Walkin' with Frankie, an album of unreleased tracks recorded for Bobby Robinson in 1960.

== Style and influence ==
Along with Lightnin' Hopkins and Lil' Son Jackson, Sims is regarded as "one of the great names in post-war Texas country blues". According to the Encyclopedia of the Blues, he had a "considerable" influence on other musicians in Dallas. T-Bone Walker acknowledged Sims's influence on his style of playing, and Hopkins got some ideas from him. Sims also guided several musicians at the start of their careers, including King Curtis and Albert Collins.

Sims's style of guitar playing was to produce rhythmical patterns over and over, but with a slight change in each repetition, giving his music an "irresistible dance beat". He produced a "twangy, ringing" sound on his electric guitar, which was "irresistible on fast numbers and stung hard on the downbeat stuff".

== Discography ==
Source: Frankie Lee Sims Discography

=== Singles (7-inch) ===
- "Home Again Blues" / "Cross Country Blues" (1948, Blue Bonnet 147)
- "Don't Forget Me Baby" / "Single Man Blues" (1948, Blue Bonnet 148)
- "Lucy Mae Blues" / "Don't Take It Out on Me" (1953, Specialty 459)
- "I'm Long Long Gone" / "Yeh Baby" (1953, Specialty 478)
- "Rhumba My Boogie" / "I'll Get Along Somehow" (1954, Specialty 487)
- "What Will Lucy Do?" / "Misery Blues" (1957, Ace 524)
- "Hey Little Girl" / "Walkin' with Frankie" (1957, Ace 527)
- "She Likes to Boogie Real Low" / "Well Goodbye Baby" (1958, Vin 1006)
- "I Warned You Baby" / "My Talk Didn't Do No Good" (1958, Ace 539)
- "Married Woman" / "Lucy Mae" (1971, Specialty 478-45)

=== Compilation albums (LP) ===
- Lucy Mae Blues (1970, Specialty SP/SPS 2124)
- Walkin' with Frankie (1985, Krazy Kat KK7428)

With Lightnin' Hopkins

- Early Recordings Vol. 2 (Arhoolie, 1966)

== See also ==
External image
- Frankie Lee Sims by Chris Strachwitz

- List of blues musicians
- List of country blues musicians
- List of electric blues musicians
- List of Texas blues musicians
