= Lightnin'! =

Studio album by Lightnin' Hopkins
- Released: 1969
- Recorded: May 20, 1969
- Studio: Sierra Sound Laboratories, Berkeley, California
- Genre: Blues
- Length: 72:30 Original LP
- Label: Poppy; PYS 60002
- Producer: Chris Strachwitz

Lightnin' Hopkins chronology
California Mudslide (and Earthquake) (1969)	Lightnin'! (1969)	In the Key of Lightnin' (2002)

CD Reissue Cover

Lightnin'! is an album by the blues musician Lightnin' Hopkins recorded in California in 1969 and released on the Poppy label as a double LP.

== Copyright dispute ==
Poppy Records failed to meet the terms of its agreement and, in 1972, Chris Strachwitz released five of the tracks on his Arhoolie label as Lightning Hopkins in Berkeley. In 1977, the album was reissued on Tomato Records and a legal dispute ensued. By 1982, a California court ruled that all rights should revert to Hopkins, and Strachwitz released another eight tracks from the sessions on Arhoolie as Po' Lightnin' in 1983. Finally, in 1993 Arhoolie, through Smithsonian Folkways, reissued the recordings on CD under the original title with some of the song titles slightly corrected.

== Reception ==
Professional ratings
Review scores
Source	Rating
AllMusic	4/5 stars
The Penguin Guide to Blues Recordings	2.5/4 stars

At the time of the original release Ralph J. Gleason's Rolling Stone review stated: "This is a twin LP package of twenty tracks by the great blues singer and guitarist and includes many of his older classics, as well as a lot of new material. It is excellently recorded and is one of the best blues packages of the year". AllMusic's Jason Ankeny stated: "Lightnin'!' is a fine introduction to Hopkins' electric blues material". The Penguin Guide to Blues Recordings stated: "The programme contains a good deal of familiar stuff, not outstandingly well done".

== Track listing ==
All compositions by Sam "Lightnin'" Hopkins except where noted

=== Original double LP (1969) ===
1. "Hold Up Your Hand" – 3:05
2. "My Starter Won't Start This Morning" – 3:12
3. "What'd I Say" (Ray Charles) – 2:44
4. "One Kind Favor" – 4:25
5. "Baby, Please Don't Go" (Traditional) – 2:55
6. "Trouble in Mind" (Richard M. Jones) – 3:09
7. "Annie's Blues" – 2:19
8. "Baby" – 2:34
9. "Little and Low" – 3:30
10. "I Hear You Calling" – 2:00
11. "Mojo Hand Part 1" – 2:50
12. "Mojo Hand Part 2" – 2:30
13. "Have You Ever Had a Woman" – 4:16
14. "Ain't It Crazy" – 2:27
15. "Black and Evil" – 3:06
16. "Rock Me Baby" – 3:27
17. "Hello Central" – 4:32
18. "Back Door Friend" – 3:04
19. "Little Girl, Little Girl" – 6:00
20. "It's Better Down the Road" – 4:25

=== CD reissue (1993) ===
1. "Mojo Hand" – 3:00
2. "Rock Me Baby" – 3:30
3. "Hello Central" – 4:32
4. "Ain't It Crazy" – 2:25
5. "Little and Low" – 3:00
6. "Hold up Your Head" – 3:05
7. "Good Times Here, Better Down the Road" – 4:25
8. "Annie's Boogie" – 2:20
9. "My Starter Won't Start This Morning" – 3:10
10. "One Kind Favor" – 4:25
11. "Little Girl" – 6:00
12. "Baby, Please Don't Go" (Traditional) – 2:55
13. "What'd I Say" (Charles) – 2:45
14. "I Hear You Calling Me" – 2:00
15. "Trouble in Mind" (Jones) – 3:10
16. "Come on Baby" – 2:35
17. "At Home Blues" – 3:05 originally released on Texas Blues Man
18. "Take a Walk" – 2:55 originally released on Texas Blues Man
19. "Little Antoinette" – 3:35 originally released on Texas Blues Man
20. "Cut Me Out Baby" – 3:25 originally released on Texas Blues Man

== Personnel ==
=== Performance ===
- Lightnin' Hopkins – electric guitar, vocals, piano, organ
- Francis Clay – drums

Additional musicians on "Rock Me Baby":

- Jeff Carp – harmonica
- Paul Asbell – guitar
- Moose Walker – piano
- Geno Skaggs – bass

=== Production ===
- Chris Strachwitz – producer
