= Take a Walk (disambiguation) =

"Take a Walk" is a 2012 song by Passion Pit.

Take a Walk may also refer to:

- "Take a Walk", a 1967 song by Lightnin' Hopkins from Texas Blues Man
- "Take a Walk", a 1982 song by Split Enz from Time and Tide
- "Take a Walk", a 1983 song by Ric Ocasek from Beatitude
- "Take a Walk", a 1989 song by Mr. Big from Mr. Big
- "Take a Walk", a 1993 song by Urge Overkill from No Alternative
- "Take a Walk", a 2001 song by Spoon from Girls Can Tell
- "Take a Walk", a 2003 song by Edie Brickell from Volcano
- "Take a Walk", a 2005 song by Sara Paxton from the Darcy's Wild Life soundtrack
