= Billy Bizor =

- Also known as: Billy Bizer, Billy Biser
- Born: September 3, 1913; Near Middleton, Leon County, Texas, U.S.
- Died: April 5, 1969 (aged 52) Houston, Texas, U.S.
- Genres: Texas blues
- Occupations: Harmonicist, singer and songwriter
- Instruments: Harmonica, vocals
- Years active: 1930s–1969
- Labels: Collectables Records; various with Lightnin' Hopkins

Billy Bizor (September 3, 1913 – April 5, 1969) was an American Texas blues harmonicist, singer and songwriter. He was musically associated with his cousin Lightnin' Hopkins, on some of whose 1960s albums Bizor played harmonica and sang backing vocals. Bizor's only solo recordings took place in 1968 and 1969, but these were not released until 1989.

== Life and career ==
Bizor was born near Middleton, Leon County, Texas, United States, ten months before the outbreak of World War I. Details of his early life are scant, but he performed locally from the 1930s in a semi-professional manner without any tangible success. He languished in total obscurity, and barely changed his playing methodology over the years. His fortunes changed somewhat courtesy of the blues revival in the 1960s, along with starting recording as a backing musician to his cousin, Lightnin' Hopkins. Bizor played harmonica, and sometimes sang backing vocals, on several of Hopkins' albums including; Walkin' This Road by Myself (1962), Lightnin' and Co. (1962), Smokes Like Lightning (1963), Talkin' Some Sense (1968), and Free Form Patterns (1968). While his contributions there went largely unheralded, the work did lead to Bizor, between 1968 and 1969, recording his only solo sessions. These took place in Houston under the guidance of record producer Roy C. Ames. In those sessions Bizor was accompanied by Lightnin' Hopkins (guitar, vocals), Donald "Duck" Dunn (rhythm guitar), Clarence Holliman (guitar), Elmore Nixon (piano), plus Linda Waring and Ben Turner (drums). His work went unreleased at the time.

Eventually issued as Blowing My Blues Away, the end result went unreleased for 20 years, but the recordings also revealed Bizor, according to AllMusic, "to be an intense, emotionally charged singer". He never saw the recordings come to light. Bizor died on April 5, 1969, of the effects of edema at the Ben Taub Hospital in Houston, Texas. He was buried at Gosto Prairie Cemetery in Centerville, Leon County, Texas.

He appeared posthumously together with Hopkins in the documentary by filmmaker Les Blank, The Blues According To Lightnin' Hopkins (1970).

Bizor's track "Screwdriver" was covered by South Filthy on their album, Crackin' Up (2005).

In 2015, Cicadelic Records released the collection, Wake Up The Dead, a double CD including all of Bizor and Hopkins joint recordings made during 1968 and 1969.

== Albums ==
=== Solo ===
- Blowing My Blues Away (Collectables Records, 1989)

=== With Lightnin' Hopkins ===
- Cousins (Blues Factory Records, 2000)
- Wake Up The Dead (Cicadelic Records, 2015)

=== Compilation ===
- Screwdriver (Carinco Neue Medien AG, 2012)

== See also ==
- List of harmonicists
