= Lightnin' Hopkins Strums the Blues =

Studio album by Lightnin' Hopkins
- Released: 1958
- Recorded: November 9, 1946, August 15, 1947 and February 25, 1948
- Studio: Radio Recorders, Los Angeles, CA and Commercial Studios, Houston, TX
- Genre: Blues
- Label: Score; SLP 4022

Lightnin' Hopkins chronology
Early Recordings Vol. 2 (1971)	Lightnin' Hopkins Strums the Blues (1958)	Lightning Hopkins Sings the Blues (1961)

Professional ratings
Review scores
Source	Rating
AllMusic	4.5/5 stars

Lightnin' Hopkins Strums the Blues is an album by blues musician Lightnin' Hopkins featuring tracks recorded between 1946 and 1948 which were originally released as 10-inch 78 rpm records on the Aladdin label. The album was one of the first 12-inch LP collections of Lightnin' Hopkins material to be released. In 1991 a double CD collection of The Complete Aladdin Recordings was released containing all of the recordings Hopkins made for the label.

== Track listing ==
All compositions by Sam "Lightnin'" Hopkins except where noted

1. "Katie May" – 3:00
2. "My California" – 2:30
3. "Honey-Babe" (Max Steiner, Paul Francis Webster) – 2:30
4. "Short Haired Woman" – 2:25
5. "Little Mama Blues" aka "Big Mama Jump" – 2:40
6. "Shotgun" aka "Shotgun Blues" – 2:36
7. "Rollin' and Rollin'" aka "Rollin' Blues" – 2:40
8. "See See Rider" (Ma Rainey) – 2:35
9. "So Long" – 2:40
10. "Mistreated" aka "Mistreated Blues" – 2:35
- Recorded at Radio Recorders in Los Angeles on November 9, 1946 (track 1) and August 15, 1947 (tracks 4 & 5) and at Commercial Studios in Houston on February 25, 1948 (tracks 2, 3 & 6–10)

== Personnel ==
- Lightnin' Hopkins – guitar, vocals
- Wilson "Thunder" Smith – piano (track 1)
