= Soul Blues (album) =

Studio album by Lightnin' Hopkins
- Released: 1965
- Recorded: May 4 & 5, 1964
- Studio: Van Gelder Studio, Englewood Cliffs, New Jersey
- Genre: Blues
- Length: 40:56
- Label: Prestige
- Producer: Ozzie Cadena

Lightnin' Hopkins chronology
Down Home Blues (1964)	Soul Blues (1965)	Lightning Hopkins with His Brothers Joel and John Henry / with Barbara Dane (1966)

Soul Blues is an album by the blues musician Lightnin' Hopkins, recorded in 1963 and released on the Bluesville label.

== Reception ==
Professional ratings
Review scores
Source	Rating
AllMusic	3/5 stars
The Penguin Guide to Blues Recordings	2.5/4 stars
The Rolling Stone Album Guide	4/5 stars

The Penguin Guide to Blues Recordings wrote: "Soul Blues has a few distinctive pieces like 'I'm Going to Build Me a Heaven of My Own' – not out of atheistic contrariness but in order to give 'lovin' women a happy home'. 'I'm a Crawling Black Snake' which has little in common with Blind Lemon Jefferson's song, is framed by oddly impressionistic guitar". AllMusic reviewer Roundup Newsletter stated: "A true poet of the blues, Lightnin' Hopkins was a master of tall, tongue-in-cheek tales, often made up on the spot in the recording studio".

== Track listing ==
All compositions by Sam "Lightnin'" Hopkins except where noted

1. "I'm Going to Build Me a Heaven of My Own" – 5:56
2. "My Babe" (Willie Dixon) – 3:20
3. "Too Many Drivers" – 3:30
4. "I'm a Crawling Black Snake" – 4:50
5. "Rocky Mountain Blues" – 3:50
6. "I Mean Goodbye" – 3:00
7. "The Howling Wolf" – 3:50
8. "Black Ghost Blues" – 3:30
9. "Darling, Do You Remember Me?" – 3:40
10. "Lonesome Graveyard" – 5:30

== Personnel ==
=== Performance ===
- Lightnin' Hopkins – guitar, vocals
- Leonard Gaskin – bass (tracks 1–3, 5–8 & 10)
- Herbie Lovelle – drums (tracks 1–3, 5–8 & 10)

=== Production ===
- Ozzie Cadena – supervision
- Rudy Van Gelder – engineer
