= Down Home Blues (Lightnin' Hopkins album) =

Studio album by Lightnin' Hopkins
- Released: 1964
- Recorded: May 4, 1964
- Studios: Van Gelder Studio, Englewood Cliffs, NJ
- Genre: Blues
- Length: 39:00
- Labels: Bluesville; BVLP 1086
- Producer: Samuel Charters

Lightnin' Hopkins chronology
The Swarthmore Concert (1993)	Down Home Blues (1964)	Soul Blues (1965)

Down Home Blues is an album by blues musician Lightnin' Hopkins recorded in 1964 and released on the Bluesville label.

== Reception ==
Professional ratings
Review scores
Source	Rating
The Penguin Guide to Blues Recordings	2.5/4 stars

The Penguin Guide to Blues Recordings said "Gaskin and Lovelle's parts were probably added at overdub sessions. On Down Home Blues only "I Was Standing on 75 Highway" is Lightnin' at full strength".

== Track listing ==
All compositions by Sam "Lightnin'" Hopkins

1. "Lets Go Sit On the Lawn" – 4:10
2. "I Woke Up This Morning" – 5:50
3. "I Got Tired" – 4:30
4. "I Like to Boogie" – 3:50
5. "I Asked the Bossman" – 6:40
6. "I'm Taking a Devil of a Chance" – 3:50
7. "Just a Wristwatch on My Arm" – 3:30
8. "I Was Standing on 75 Highway" – 5:10
9. "Get It Straight" – 1:30

== Personnel ==
=== Performance ===
- Lightnin' Hopkins – guitar, vocals
- Leonard Gaskin – bass (tracks 1, 2, 8 & 9)
- Herbie Lovelle – drums (tracks 1, 2, 8 & 9)

=== Production ===
- Samuel Charters – producer
- Rudy Van Gelder – engineer
