= Live at Newport (Lightnin' Hopkins album) =

Live album by Lightnin' Hopkins
- Released: 2002
- Recorded: July 24, 1965
- Venue: Newport Folk Festival, Newport, RI
- Genre: Blues
- Length: 40:28
- Label: Vanguard; VCD 79715-2
- Producer: Tom Vickers

Lightnin' Hopkins chronology
Blue Lightnin' (1967)	Live at Newport (2002)	Lightnin' Strikes (1966)

Live at Newport is a live album by the blues musician Lightnin' Hopkins, recorded at the Newport Folk Festival in 1965. Several tracks were released on three Vanguard Records compilation albums, The Great Blues Men (1971), Great Bluesmen Newport (1977), and Blues with a Feeling (1993), before the complete performance was released on CD in 2002.

== Reception ==
Professional ratings
Review scores
Source	Rating
AllMusic	4/5 stars
The Penguin Guide to Blues Recordings	2.5/4 stars

AllMusic reviewer Ronnie D. Lankford Jr. wrote: "Recorded in 1965, Live at Newport captures Hopkins in a loose mood communing with an appreciative audience. The mostly solo electric set apparently didn't cause any controversy (as Dylan's electric set with the Paul Butterfield Blues Band would in 1965). The nice thing about the album is that all the material seems to have come from the same set, giving the listener a taste of what seeing Hopkins at Newport might have been like. ... Live at Newport also includes several unreleased versions, making it a good album to add to one's Hopkins collection". The Penguin Guide to Blues Recordings noted: "This amiable set from the Newport Folk Festival is stocked, as might be expected, with common pieces ... but includes long, ostensibly autobiographical 'Cotton Patch Blues'. Although Lightnin' says several times he needs to warm up his fingers, he pulls off some startling guitar runs".

== Track listing ==
All compositions by Sam "Lightnin'" Hopkins except where noted

1. Introduction by Michael Bloomfield – 0:56
2. "Where Can I Find My Baby?" – 3:15
3. "Baby, Please Don't Go" (Traditional) – 3:16 Originally released on Blues with a Feeling
4. "Mojo Hand" – 3:55
5. "Trouble in Mind" (Richard M. Jones) – 2:40
6. "The Woman I'm Loving, She's Taken My Appetite" – 4:01 Originally released on Blues with a Feeling
7. "Come On Baby" – 2:11 Originally released on Blues with a Feeling
8. "Cotton Patch Blues" – 8:34 Originally released in edited form as "Cotton Field Blues" on The Great Blues Men
9. "Instrumental" – 3:55
10. "Jealous of My Wife" – 2:59
11. "Every Day About This Time (Instrumental)" – 2:58
12. "Shake That Thing" – 1:41 Originally released on Great Bluesmen Newport

== Personnel ==
=== Performance ===
- Lightnin' Hopkins – guitar, vocals
- Sam Lay – drums (tracks 8–12)

=== Production ===
- Tom Vickers – compilation producer
- Jeff Zaraya – engineer
- Barry Ridge – art director
- Drew Cartwright – graphic design
- John Milward – liner notes
- Doug Fulton, Ray Flerlage – photography
