= Encyclopedia of Vernacular Architecture of the World =

The Encyclopedia of Vernacular Architecture of the World is a three-volume encyclopedia detailing the traditional architecture of the world, by cultural region. Published in 1997, it was edited by Paul Oliver of the Oxford Institute for Sustainable Development and Oxford Brookes University.

The work was initially published by the Cambridge University Press in three volumes, totalling 2,500 pages. According to its website, "The first of the three volumes focuses on the theories, principles and philosophy that underpin traditional architecture. Volumes 2 and 3 consider these principles within specific cultural and societal contexts."

As of 2012 this encyclopedia is out of print and generally unavailable. Copies available on the internet range from $2,500 to over $5,000 (U.S.D)

The encyclopedia includes a glossary, lexicon and bibliography and most styles described are also illustrated.

The companion volume Atlas of Vernacular Architecture of the World is published by Routledge.
