= Lightning Hopkins Sings the Blues =

Studio album by Lightnin' Hopkins
- Released: 1961
- Recorded: October 1947–1951
- Studio: Gold Star (Houston, Texas)
- Genre: Blues
- Length: 25:50
- Label: Crown; CLP-5224

Lightnin' Hopkins chronology
Lightnin' Hopkins Strums the Blues (1958)	Lightning Hopkins Sings the Blues (1961)	Last of the Great Blues Singers (1960)

Professional ratings
Review scores
Source	Rating
AllMusic	4.5/5 stars

Lightning Hopkins Sings the Blues, also released as Original Folk Blues, is a 12-inch LP album by blues musician Lightnin' Hopkins collecting tracks recorded between 1947 and 1951 that were originally released as 10-inch 78 rpm records on the RPM label. The album was released on the Mainstream Records low budget, Crown subsidiary and was an early 12-inch LP collections of Lightnin' Hopkins material recorded at Gold Star Studios to be released. The compilation was likely assembled without direct involvement from Hopkins, as was standard practice for budget reissues of the era. In 1999 a double CD collection of Jake Head Boogie was released containing all of the Hopkins recordings released by the RPM label along with several previously unreleased recordings.

== Track listing ==
All compositions by Sam "Lightnin'" Hopkins

1. "Just Sittin' Down Thinkin'" – 2:33
2. "Jake Head Boogie" – 2:53
3. "Lonesome Dog Blues" – 2:38
4. "Tell Me Pretty Mama" – 3:03
5. "Last Affair" – 2:55
6. "Don't Keep My Baby Long" – 2:15
7. "Santa Fe Blues" – 2:23
8. "Give Me Back That Wig" – 1:56
9. "Someday" – 2:38
10. "Ain't It Lonesome" – 2:36

== Personnel ==
- Lightnin' Hopkins – guitar, vocals
