= Francis Clay =

- Born: November 16, 1923; Rock Island, Illinois, United States
- Died: January 21, 2008 (aged 84) San Francisco, California, United States
- Genres: Blues, Chicago blues, jazz
- Occupations: Musician songwriter, poet
- Instruments: Drums, percussion
- Label: Arhoolie

Francis Clay (November 16, 1923 – January 21, 2008) was an American jazz and blues drummer, best known for his work behind Muddy Waters in the 1950s and 1960s, and as a co-founder of the James Cotton Blues Band in 1967. With Cotton, he toured Europe in 1968 and recorded the album Pure Cotton. Clay's jazz-influenced style is cited as an influence by many of the British Invasion rock 'n' rollers of the 1960s such as Charlie Watts and Ronnie Wood of the Rolling Stones and Faces, respectively.

Born and raised in Rock Island, Illinois, he started playing jazz, professionally at the age of 15, played drums behind many of the biggest names of 20th century popular American music.

Clay came from a musical family; his father was a multi-instrumentalist and square dance caller from Missouri. By age five, Clay was performing bird and animal imitations, playing guitar, and singing. At ten, he carved his own drumsticks and made a practice pad, teaching himself to play drums. His first professional engagement came in 1938 with Pat Patrick's band in Davenport, Iowa. The following year, he filled in for three weeks with the Jay McShann orchestra, which at the time featured Charlie Parker and Dizzy Gillespie. In 1940, he formed his own group, Francis Clay And His Syncopated Rhythm, and spent the early 1940s working the vaudeville and touring circuit, performing on the S.S. Idlewild riverboat and with the Austin Brothers Circus. He moved to Chicago in the late 1940s and spent a decade playing in jazz groups before joining Muddy Waters' band in 1957.

In his career, Clay claimed to have backed Gypsy Rose Lee, and played with Jay McShann and Charlie Parker early on and with Jimi Hendrix while in New York's Greenwich Village. He can be heard on recordings including John Lee Hooker's Live at Cafe Au Go Go and can be seen and heard on documents from the Waters band's 1960 Newport Jazz Festival appearance, and on albums issued by the Arhoolie label by Big Mama Thornton and Lightning Hopkins, among many others.

Clay made his home in San Francisco in the late 1960s and became a part of the music scene in the Bay Area throughout the rest of his life. His birthday parties at the Biscuits and Blues nightclub were an annual gathering of the tribe, and he was known also as "the ambassador" at the annual San Francisco Blues Festival, where he was the subject of a tribute in 2007, and mourned in 2008.

Clay claimed to have been deprived of recognition for his compositional contributions to the Waters oeuvre. Songs he claimed to have composed and/or arranged included "Walking in the Park," "She's Nineteen Years Old" and "Tiger in Your Hole."

== Discography ==
With John Lee Hooker

- Live at Cafe Au Go Go (BluesWay, 1967)

With Lightnin' Hopkins

- Lightnin'! (Poppy, 1969)
- In the Key of Lightnin' (Tomato, 1969 [2002])
- Lightning Hopkins in Berkeley (Arhoolie, 1969 [1972])

With Jimmy Rogers

- Jimmy Rogers (Chess, 1950–60)

With Otis Spann

- The Blues Is Where It's At (BluesWay, 1966)

With Muddy Waters

- Muddy Waters Sings "Big Bill" (Chess, 1960)
- At Newport 1960 (Chess, 1960)
- Folk Singer (Chess, 1964)

== Bibliography ==
- Ronnie, by Ronnie Wood, St. Martin's Press, 2007, ISBN 978-0312366520
