= Lightnin' and the Blues =

Studio album by Lightnin' Hopkins
- Released: 1960
- Recorded: April 1954
- Studio: Houston, Texas
- Genre: Blues
- Length: 30:56 Original LP release
- Label: Herald; HLP 1012

Lightnin' Hopkins chronology
Last of the Great Blues Singers (1960)	Lightnin' and the Blues (1960)	Lightnin' Hopkins (1959)

Professional ratings
Review scores
Source	Rating
AllMusic (2001 reissue)	3.5/5 stars

Lightnin' and the Blues is a 12-inch LP album by blues musician Lightnin' Hopkins, collecting twelve tracks recorded in 1954 that were originally released as 7-inch singles on the Herald Records label. Since its original release, Lightnin' and the Blues has been reissued several times including in 2001 and later in 2016 when it was expanded to a 30 song track-list. The material Hopkins recorded with Herald Records in 1954 has also been released under various other compilations, including Collectables Records' two volumes The Herald Recordings and The Herald Recordings Vol. 2.

== Track listing ==
All compositions by Sam "Lightnin'" Hopkins

1. "Nothin' But the Blues" – 2:22
2. "Don't Think Cause You're Pretty" – 2:40
3. "Lightnin's Boogie" – 2:35
4. "Life I Used to Live" – 2:49
5. "Sick Feelin' Blues" – 2:15
6. "Evil Hearted Woman" – 2:47
7. "Blues for My Cookie" – 2:27
8. "Sittin' Down Thinkin'" – 2:45
9. "My Baby's Gone" – 2:46
10. "Lonesome in Your Home" – 2:45
11. "Lightnin's Special" – 2:22
12. "My Little Kewpie Doll" – 2:23
13. "Let's Move" – 2:19 Additional 2016 track not on original LP
14. "Had a Gal Called Sal" – 2:17 Additional 2016 track not on original LP
15. "Shine on Moon" – 2:40 Additional 2016 track not on original LP
16. "Don't Need No Job" – 2:18 Additional 2016 track not on original LP
17. "Early Mornin' Boogie" – 2:14 Additional 2016 track not on original LP
18. "Blues Is a Mighty Bad Feeling" – 2:27 Additional 2016 track not on original LP
19. "Boogie Woogie Dance" – 2:36 Additional 2016 track not on original LP
20. "Please Don't Go Baby" – 2:44 Additional 2016 track not on original LP
21. "Finally Met My Baby" – 2:22 Additional 2016 track not on original LP
22. "That's Alright Baby" – 3:01 Additional 2016 track not on original LP
23. "I Love You Baby" – 2:30 Additional 2016 track not on original LP
24. "Grandma's Boogie" – 2:35 Additional 2016 track not on original LP
25. "Hear Me Talkin'" – 2:16 Additional 2016 track not on original LP
26. "Lightnin's Stomp" – 2:39 Additional 2016 track not on original LP
27. "Lightnin' Don't Feel Well" – 3:22 Additional 2016 track not on original LP
28. "Flash Lightnin'" – 2:29 Additional 2016 track not on original LP
29. "Shine on Moon" – 2:36 Additional 2016 track not on original LP
30. "Hopkin's Sky Hop" – 2:14 Additional 2016 track not on original LP

== Personnel ==
- Lightnin' Hopkins – guitar, vocals
