= Early Recordings Vol. 2 =

Compilation album by Lightnin' Hopkins
- Released: 1971
- Recorded: late 1940s
- Studio: Gold Star (Houston, Texas)
- Genre: Blues
- Length: 44:29
- Label: Arhoolie
- Compiler: Bill Quinn, Chris Strachwitz

Lightnin' Hopkins chronology
Early Recordings (1965)	Early Recordings Vol. 2 (1971)	Lightnin' Hopkins Strums the Blues (1958)

Early Recordings Vol. 2 is an album by blues musician Lightnin' Hopkins featuring tracks recorded at Gold Star Studios in Houston, Texas between 1946 and 1950, thirteen of which were originally released as 10-inch 78 rpm records on the Gold Star and Dart labels, along with three others that were previously unissued. Arhoolie reissued The Gold Star Sessions on two CDs through Smithsonian Folkways in 1990.

== Reception ==
Professional ratings
Review scores
Source	Rating
AllMusic	4/5 stars

AllMusic reviewer Eugene Chadbourne stated: "The Arhoolie collection of recordings done for the Texas Gold Star label continued with a particularly well-assembled collection in which a few interesting variations in recording and backup musicians contribute to a sense of variety often missing from albums by this artist. There are also some vocal performances here that are among Hopkins' best committed to vinyl ... These recordings are all very typical of the Hopkins approach in that many songs were probably improvised on the spot, or at least whipped up around a framework or some kind of skeletal idea. Hopkins has quite a strange attention span, sometimes approaching a song with strong concentration until he is halfway through, then becoming casual and letting things drift off completely. Aspects like this, and his way of improvising instrumental breaks in which the chord structure or tempo can be transformed at whim, make this a kind of blues that is challenging not only for the listener but for the performer as well.".

== Track listing ==
All compositions by Sam "Lightnin'" Hopkins

1. "Short Haired Woman" – 2:22
2. "Old Woman Blues" – 3:04
3. "Untrue Blues" – 3:03
4. "T-Model Blues" – 2:39
5. "Jailhouse Blues" – 3:03
6. "Trying to Find a Friend" – 3:07
7. "Can't Be Successful" aka "Unsuccessful Blues" – 2:23
8. "Tom Moore Blues" – 2:41
9. "Fast Life Woman" – 2:25
10. "Grosebeck Blues" [Take 2] – 2:25 previously unreleased
11. "Grosebeck Blues" [Take 3] – 2:37 previously unreleased
12. "Rollin' Woman Blues" – 2:49
13. "Ain't It a Shame" – 2:56
14. "Somebody's Got to Go" – 2:48
15. "Automobile Blues" – 2:50
16. "All I Got Is Gone" – 3:06 previously unreleased

== Personnel ==
- Lightnin' Hopkins – guitar, vocals, organ
- Joel Hopkins – guitar (track 1)
- Frankie Lee Sims – slide guitar (tracks 5 & 6)
