= Something Blue (Lightnin' Hopkins album) =

Studio album by Lightnin' Hopkins
- Released: 1967
- Recorded: October 1965
- Studio: Los Angeles, CA
- Genre: Blues
- Length: 35:17
- Label: Verve Forecast; FTS 3013
- Producer: David Hubert

Lightnin' Hopkins chronology
Lightnin' Strikes (1966)	Something Blue (1967)	Texas Blues Man (1968)

Something Blue is an album by blues musician Lightnin' Hopkins recorded in Los Angeles in 1965 and released on the Verve Folkways label in 1967.

== Reception ==
Professional ratings
Review scores
Source	Rating
AllMusic	3.5/5 stars
The Penguin Guide to Blues Recordings	3/4 stars

AllMusic's Steve Legget reviewed a CD compilation of the tracks and stated: "the result is actually a pretty decent record, featuring the slickest-sounding (relatively – we're talking Lightnin' here) Hopkins you're ever going to encounter. Given a backing band of Earl Palmer on drums, Jimmy Bond on bass, and Joe "Streamline" Ewing on trombone, Hopkins turns in measured (for him) and almost jazzy renditions of "Shining Moon," "Talk of the Town," and "Shaggy Dad," and even with the unlikely trombone accompaniment, it all works". The Penguin Guide to Blues Recordings called it: "a rather weird album Lightnin' recorded for Verve-Folkways, accompanied by bass, drums and jazz trombonist John "Streamline" Being. Among some routine but perfectly acceptable blues and boogies Lightnin' remembers an old song his brother Joel also sang "Good Times" and the rag song "Shaggy Dad"".

== Track listing ==
All compositions by Sam "Lightnin'" Hopkins except where noted

1. "Shaggy Dad" – 2:42
2. "I'll Be Gone" – 5:00
3. "Shining Moon" – 4:00
4. "Shake It Baby" – 4:53
5. "Goin' Back Home" – 4:53
6. "Good Times" – 4:10
7. "What'd I Say" (Ray Charles) – 2:22
8. "Don't Wake Me" – 4:42
9. "Talk of the Town" – 2:35

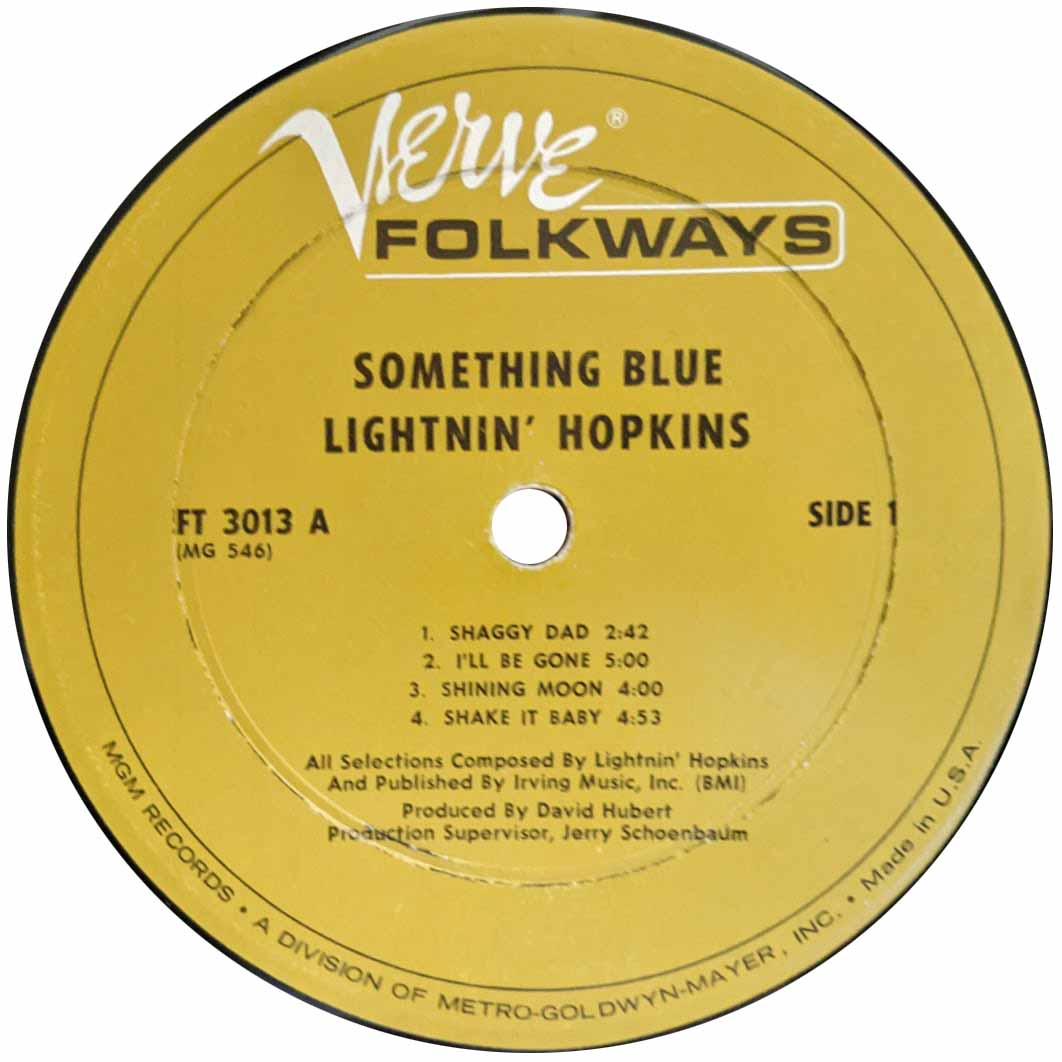
Original Verve Folkways record label used for Lightnin' Hopkins "Something Blue", 1967

== Personnel ==
=== Performance ===
- Lightnin' Hopkins – electric guitar, vocals
- John Ewing – trombone
- Jimmy Bond – bass
- Earl Palmer – drums
