= The Swarthmore Concert =

Live album by Lightnin' Hopkins
- Released: 1993
- Recorded: April 6, 1964
- Venue: Swarthmore College Folk Festival, Swarthmore, PA
- Genre: Blues
- Length: 33:46
- Label: Bluesville; 00025218056328
- Producer: Shel Kagen

Lightnin' Hopkins chronology
Goin' Away (1963)	The Swarthmore Concert (1993)	Down Home Blues (1964)

The Swarthmore Concert, subtitled King of the Blues, is a live album by the blues musician Lightnin' Hopkins, recorded at the Swarthmore College Folk Festival in 1965. It was originally released as part of the seven-CD box set Lightnin' Hopkins: The Complete Prestige/Bluesville Recordings, in 1991, before being reissued on Bluesville as a single CD in 1993.

== Reception ==
Professional ratings
Review scores
Source	Rating
AllMusic	4/5 stars
The Penguin Guide to Blues Recordings	3/4 stars

AllMusic reviewer Cub Koda stated: "this languished unissued in Fantasy Records' vaults until its release in the early '90s. That's a shame, because this concert captures Lightnin' at his beguiling best, spinning tales and blues magic with every track. ... If you want a disc that clearly showcases Lightnin' Hopkins at his enchanting best, start your collection with this one; it's a charmer".

== Track listing ==
All compositions by Sam "Lightnin'" Hopkins except where noted

1. "Baby, Please Don't Go" (Traditional ) – 2:09
2. "My Black Cadillac" – 1:44
3. "It's Crazy" – 2:32
4. "Mojo Hand" – 3:02
5. "My Babe" (Willie Dixon) – 2:20
6. "Short Haired Woman" – 3:52
7. "Mean Old Frisco" (Arthur Crudup) – 1:53
8. "Trouble in Mind" (Richard M. Jones) – 2:44
9. "The Twister" – 3:04
10. "Green Onion" – 1:31
11. "Sun Goin' Down" – 3:20
12. "Come Go Home with Me" – 2:28
13. "I'm a Stranger" – 3:07

== Personnel ==
=== Performance ===
- Lightnin' Hopkins – guitar, vocals
