= In the Key of Lightnin' =

Studio album by Lightnin' Hopkins
- Released: August 27, 2002
- Recorded: May 20, 1969
- Studio: Sierra Sound Laboratories, Berkeley, California
- Genre: Blues
- Length: 43:31
- Label: Tomato; TOM 2098
- Producer: Chris Strachwitz, Jim Malloy, Kevin Eggers

Lightnin' Hopkins chronology
Lightnin'! (1969)	In the Key of Lightnin' (2002)	Lightning Hopkins in Berkeley (1969)

In the Key of Lightnin' is an album by blues musician Lightnin' Hopkins, recorded at the sessions that produced Lightnin'! in California in 1969, but not released until 2002 on the Tomato label.

== Reception ==
Professional ratings
Review scores
Source	Rating
The Penguin Guide to Blues Recordings	2.5/4 stars

The Penguin Guide to Blues Recordings said: "In the Key of Lightnin' contains unissued material from the Poppy sessions with the full band on "What'd I Say" and "Katie May". Five tracks are snatches of inconsequential talking".

== Track listing ==
All compositions by Sam "Lightnin'" Hopkins except where noted

1. "Lightnin' Declares" – 0:20
2. "Cryin' Shame (Shake That Thing)" – 2:32
3. "Last Night I Lost the Best Friend I Ever Had" – 2:52
4. "Baby, Please Lend Me Your Love" – 3:14
5. "Short Haired Woman" Discourse – 0:28
6. "Short Haired Woman" – 3:27
7. "Cigar" Chatter – 0:41
8. "Pneumonia Blues" (Blind Lemon Jefferson) – 2:42
9. "What'd I Say" (Ray Charles) – 2:32
10. "Katie Mae" – 6:38
11. "Black Cadillac" – 3:03
12. "One for the Gamblin'" – 3:45
13. "I Gave Up Card Playin'" Pronouncement – 0:28
14. "I Once Was a Gambler" – 1:45
15. "Where Did You Stay Last Night?" – 3:46
16. "Careless Love" (Traditional) – 1:59
17. ""Black Lightnin'" Rap" – 0:30
18. "Lightnin' Slow Blues" – 2:49

== Personnel ==
=== Performance ===
- Lightnin' Hopkins – electric guitar, vocals
- Francis Clay – drums (tracks 2, 3, 6, 8–11, 15, 16 & 18)
- Jeff Carp – harmonica (tracks 9 & 10)
- Paul Asbell – guitar (tracks 9 & 10)
- Moose Walker – piano (tracks 9 & 10)
- Geno Skaggs – bass (tracks 1, 9 & 10)

=== Production ===
- Jim Malloy, Kevin Eggers – producer
