= Hootin' the Blues =

Live album by Lightnin' Hopkins
- Released: 1964
- Recorded: May 17, 1962
- Venue: The 2nd Fret (Philadelphia)
- Genre: Blues
- Length: 362:30
- Label: Prestige Folklore; FL 14021
- Producer: Shel Kagan

Lightnin' Hopkins chronology
Lightnin' Strikes (1962)	Hootin' the Blues (1964)	Goin' Away (1963)

Hootin' the Blues is a live album by blues guitarist and singer Lightnin' Hopkins. Recorded in Philadelphia in 1962, it was released in 1964 on Prestige Records' subsidiary label Prestige Folklore.

== Reception ==
Professional ratings
Review scores
Source	Rating
AllMusic	3/5 stars
The Penguin Guide to Blues Recordings	2.5/4 stars
Record Mirror	3/5 stars

The Penguin Guide to Blues Recordings wrote that "this set gives an accurate idea of the repertoire Lightnin' tended to choose when playing for folkclub audiences". AllMusic reviewer Bruce Eder stated: "Hootin' The Blues is one of Hopkins' better folk club concerts, capturing him in an intense performance on acoustic guitar, rapping (in the sense of talking) about the blues and what it means as he introduces some powerful songs ... The best moment, though, is his reinvention of Ray Charles' 'What'd I Say' as an acoustic guitar number (trust me, it works), which displays the kind of fingering that must've made a young Eric Clapton want to sit down and cry".

== Track listing ==
All compositions by Sam "Lightnin'" Hopkins except where noted

1. "Blues Is a Feeling" – 8:00
2. "Me and Ray Charles" (Ray Charles (Note: Credited as being written by Hopkins on the original LP release, but this track is in fact a retitled cover of Charles' "What'd I Say".)) – 3:35
3. "In the Evening (When the Sun Goes Down)" (Leroy Carr, Don Raye) – 3:21
4. "Ain't It Crazy" – 2:26
5. "Last Night I Lost the Best Friend I Ever Had" – 4:33
6. "Everything" – 2:58
7. "I Work Down on the Chain Gang" – 5:10
8. "Meet Me in the Bottom" – 2:27

== Personnel ==
=== Performance ===
- Lightnin' Hopkins – guitar, vocals

=== Production ===
- Shel Kagan – supervision
- Esmond Edwards – engineer
