= Lightnin' Strikes (Verve Folkways album) =

Studio album by Lightnin' Hopkins
- Released: 1966
- Recorded: October 4 & 5, 1965
- Studio: Los Angeles, CA
- Genre: Blues
- Length: 38:42
- Label: Verve Folkways; FVS 9022
- Producer: David Hubert

Lightnin' Hopkins chronology
Live at Newport (2002)	Lightnin' Strikes (1966)	Something Blue (1967)

Lightnin' Strikes (reissued as Nothin' But the Blues) is an album by blues musician Lightnin' Hopkins recorded in Los Angeles in 1965 and released on the Vee-Jay label.

== Reception ==
Professional ratings
Review scores
Source	Rating
AllMusic	4.5/5 stars

Cub Koda, writing for AllMusic, described a later compilation featuring the entire album as an "interesting collection" and opined, "For a hodgepodge of leftovers, there's a lot of great Lightnin' on here."

== Track listing ==
All compositions by Sam "Lightnin'" Hopkins

1. "Mojo Hand" – 3:13
2. "Little Wail" – 2:50
3. "Cotton" – 5:57
4. "Take Me Back" – 2:55
5. "Nothin' But the Blues" – 5:15
6. "Hurricane Betsy" – 5:45
7. "Guitar Lightnin'" – 4:12
8. "Woke Up This Morning" – 4:20
9. "Shake Yourself" – 4:15

== Personnel ==
=== Performance ===
- Lightnin' Hopkins – electric guitar, vocals
- Don Crawford – harmonica
- Jimmy Bond – bass
- Earl Palmer – drums
