= Last of the Great Blues Singers =

Studio album by Lightnin' Hopkins
- Released: 1960
- Recorded: 1950–51
- Genre: Blues
- Length: 34:22
- Label: Time; T/70004
- Producer: Bob Shad

Lightnin' Hopkins chronology
Lightning Hopkins Sings the Blues (1961)	Last of the Great Blues Singers (1960)	Lightnin' and the Blues (1960)

Last of the Great Blues Singers, also released as Vol. 1 Blues / Folk Series, The Blues and Blues Train, is a 12-inch LP album by blues musician Lightnin' Hopkins featuring tracks recorded between 1951 and 1953 that were originally released as 10-inch 78 rpm records on Bob Shad's Sittin' in With label. The album was one of the earlier collections of Lightnin' Hopkins material to be released. In 2004 a CD collection, Hello Central: The Best of Lightnin' Hopkins, was released by Legacy Recordings containing all of the recordings Hopkins made for the Sittin' in With label.

== Reception ==
Professional ratings
Review scores
Source	Rating
AllMusic	4/5 stars

AllMusic reviewer Bill Dahl stated: "Classic sides from Hopkins' 1950–1951 stint with Bobby Shad's Sittin' in With logo ... include two of his biggest hits, "Hello Central" and "Coffee Blues.".

== Track listing ==
All compositions by Sam "Lightnin'" Hopkins

1. "Hello Central" – 2:55
2. "Coffee Blues" – 2:40
3. "Long Way from Texas" – 2:57
4. "Mad As I Can Be" – 3:07
5. "New Short-Haired Woman" – 2:55
6. "Gotta Move" – 2:45
7. "Everybody's Down On Me" – 2:57
8. "Freight Train" – 2:49
9. "Prayin' Ground Blues" – 2:55
10. "Don't Think I'm Crazy" – 2:45
11. "Dirty House Blues" – 2:55
12. "Everything Happens to Me" – 2:42

== Personnel ==
- Lightnin' Hopkins – guitar, vocals
- Donald Cooks – bass (tracks 5, 7, 8 & 11)
