= California Mudslide (and Earthquake) =

Studio album by Lightnin' Hopkins
- Released: 1969
- Recorded: 1969
- Studio: Vault Studios, Hollywood, CA
- Genre: Blues
- Length: 35:55
- Label: Vault; SLP 129
- Producer: Bruce Bromberg

Lightnin' Hopkins chronology
The Great Electric Show and Dance (1969)	California Mudslide (and Earthquake) (1969)	Lightnin'! (1969)

California Mudslide (and Earthquake), also reissued as Los Angeles Blues, is an album by the blues musician Lightnin' Hopkins, recorded in California in 1969 and released on the Vault label.

== Reception ==
Professional ratings
Review scores
Source	Rating
AllMusic	3.5/5 stars
The Penguin Guide to Blues Recordings	3.5/4 stars

AllMusic's Steve Legget called a CD compilation of the tracks "a pretty decent record," writing: "Sometimes you can just grab a handful of stuff and throw it at the wall and it magically sticks there in a pleasing pattern. One suspects that's the case here". The Penguin Guide to Blues Recordings wrote: "In 'California Mudslide' Lightnin' adapts an old Texas flood blues to apply to recent heavy rains in the Golden State, but several other pieces have been dredged from deep in his repertoire and hardly altered".

== Track listing ==
All compositions by Sam "Lightnin'" Hopkins

1. "California Mudslide" – 4:02
2. "Rosie Mae" – 2:59
3. "Los Angeles Blues" – 4:46
4. "Easy on Your Heels" – 2:40
5. "New Santa Fe" – 3:09
6. "Jesus, Will You Come by Here" – 2:14
7. "No Education" – 3:25
8. "Antoinette's Blues" – 3:27
9. "Change My Way of Living" – 3:37
10. "Los Angeles Boogie" – 2:11
11. "Call on My Baby" – 3:25

== Personnel ==
=== Performance ===
- Lightnin' Hopkins – guitar, vocals
- Tony Joe White – guitar, liner notes

=== Production ===
- Bruce Bromberg – producer
