= Little Hat Jones =

American Texas blues musician (1899–1981)

- Born: George Jones; October 5, 1899; Bowie County, Texas, United States
- Died: March 7, 1981 (aged 81) Naples, Texas, United States
- Genres: Texas blues
- Instrument(s): Vocals, guitar
- Labels: Okeh

George "Little Hat" Jones (October 5, 1899 – March 7, 1981) was an American Texas blues musician.

== Biography ==
Jones, the grandson of a former slave, was born in Bowie County, Texas, the only child of Felix Jones and his wife.

At the time, manpower was often scarce on family farms and Jones' grandfather had already died when he was in fourth grade. Jones stated that he first started playing piano at the old Union Hill church. He dropped out of school at the age of 13 to support the family farm after his father had suffered from an illness, their cotton crop had been destroyed, and their two plowing mules and milking cow all had died. It is unclear whether Jones began learning guitar as early as seven years old or at a later age. In any event, it was around the age of 13 that Jones' mother had, in his own words according to a 1964 interview, "done gone and found an old guitar for me to pick". He said he believed that she had done this in order to keep him at home instead of playing piano at the church.

Little is known about Jones' activities in his late teens. However, by the 1920s, Jones was a street busker in San Antonio. The nickname "Little Hat" was acquired from a construction job in Garland, where Jones wore a hat with part of the brim torn. He recorded two compositions, "New Two Sixteen Blues" and "Two String Blues", released as a single by Okeh Records on June 15, 1929. That same day, he played guitar on nine tracks by Alger "Texas" Alexander in the Okeh studio. On June 21, Jones recorded four additional songs for Okeh, and on June 14, 1930, he recorded six more. These three sessions represent the majority of Jones's recorded output: ten songs of his own and nine with Texas Alexander. He also had two tracks on Yazoo L-1010 (LP, 1968), "Hurry Blues" and "Rollin from Side to Side", both listed as recorded in 1929. Jones performed at parties, fish fries and juke joints, often in the company of Thomas Shaw, Texas Alexander, and J. T. Smith.

Jones never recorded another song. He resided in Naples, Texas, where he would stay for the rest of his life with his second wife, while working in various jobs. He died in 1981, at the age of 81.

Jones's style is marked by his tendency to start a song at one tempo and then slow down once he began to sing. Once a forgotten obscurity, he became better known later in the 20th century as historians began to explore the Okeh Records catalogue. His posthumous fame was also boosted by the use of his song "Bye Bye Baby Blues" in the movie Ghost World in 2001.
