= Goin' Away =

Studio album by Lightnin' Hopkins
- Released: 1963
- Recorded: June 4, 1963
- Studio: Van Gelder Studio, Englewood Cliffs, NJ
- Genre: Blues
- Length: 36:24
- Label: Bluesville; BVLP 1073
- Producer: Ozzie Cadena

Lightnin' Hopkins chronology
| Hootin' the Blues (1962) | Goin' Away (1963) | The Swarthmore Concert (1993) |

Goin' Away is an album by the blues musician Lightnin' Hopkins, recorded in 1963 and released on the Bluesville label.

== Reception ==
Professional ratings
Review scores
| Source | Rating |
|---|---|
| AllMusic | 3/5 stars |
| The Penguin Guide to Blues Recordings | 3/4 stars |

The Penguin Guide to Blues Recordings wrote: "The high points of this session are the title track, suffused with rural quiet, and 'Business You're Doin' ', an old rag song similar to 'Take Me Back' which Lightnin' plays as if he's been listening to John Hurt ... Gaskin and Lovelle show up some of the rhythm sections Lightnin' used in later years: though their touch is light, they are propulsive rather than responsive and never allow the music to drag". AllMusic reviewer Stephen Thomas Erlewine stated: "For the 1963 album Goin' Away, Lightnin' Hopkins was backed by a spare rhythm section who managed to follow his ramshackle, instinctual sense of rhythm quite dexterously, giving Hopkins' skeletal guitar playing some muscle. Still, the spotlight remains Hopkins, who is in fine form here. There are no real classics here, but everything is solid".

== Track listing ==
All compositions by Sam "Lightnin'" Hopkins

1. "Wake Up Old Lady" – 4:24
2. "Don't Embarrass Me, Baby" – 3:20
3. "Stranger Here" – 5:49
4. "Little Sister's Boogie" – 3:30
5. "Goin' Away" – 5:45
6. "You Better Stop Her" – 4:39
7. "Business You're Doin'" – 3:18
8. "I'm Wit' It" – 3:58

== Personnel ==
=== Performance ===
- Lightnin' Hopkins – guitar, vocals
- Leonard Gaskin – bass
- Herbie Lovelle – drums

=== Production ===
- Ozzie Cadena – supervision
- Rudy Van Gelder – engineer
