= The Great Electric Show and Dance =

Studio album by Lightnin' Hopkins
- Released: 1969
- Recorded: 1969
- Studio: ACA Recording Studios, Houston and Steve Wright's Studio, Tyler, TX
- Genre: Blues
- Length: 25:49
- Label: Jewel Records; LP/LPS 5002
- Producer: Don Logan

Lightnin' Hopkins chronology
Free Form Patterns (1968)	The Great Electric Show and Dance (1969)	California Mudslide (and Earthquake) (1969)

The Great Electric Show and Dance is an album by blues musician Lightnin' Hopkins recorded in Texas and released on Stan Lewis' Jewel Records label in 1969.

== Reception ==
Professional ratings
Review scores
Source	Rating
AllMusic	2.5/5 stars

AllMusic reviewer Steve Leggett stated: "what these tracks reveal is a thoroughly professional band struggling to make heads or tails out of Hopkins' abrupt, seemingly random chord changes and tendency to elongate or shorten sung lines at will. Nothing really congeals as the band chases the baffling and elusive Hopkins from cut to cut, occasionally locking in, only to have Hopkins veer off into new rhythmic directions that apparently only he could anticipate. It's fascinating in a way, a bit like watching blind drunks navigate home from the bar at closing time, each one on roller skates and with a firmly held but completely different idea about longitude and latitude. No one really wins here, not Hopkins, not the band, and certainly not anyone listening to it, making this an album only dead serious Lightnin' Hopkins collectors should seek to find".

== Track listing ==
All compositions by Sam "Lightnin'" Hopkins

1. "Lovin' Arms" – 2:48
2. "Rock Me Mama" – 2:00
3. "Mr. Charlie, Pt. One" – 2:15
4. "Mr. Charlie, Pt. Two" – 2:30
5. "Play with Your Poodle" – 1:25
6. "You're Too Fast" – 1:45
7. "Love Me This Morning" – 3:20
8. "I'm Comin' Home" – 2:45
9. "Ride in Your New Automobile" – 3:06
10. "Breakfast Time" – 2:55

== Personnel ==
=== Performance ===
- Lightnin' Hopkins – guitar, vocals
- Unidentified musicians – harmonica, keyboards. bass, drums

=== Production ===
- Don Logan – producer
