= Lightning Hopkins in Berkeley =

Studio album by Lightnin' Hopkins
- Released: 1972
- Recorded: May 20 and December 8, 1969
- Studio: Sierra Sound Laboratories and Chris Strachwitz' House, Berkeley, CA
- Genre: Blues
- Length: 40:37
- Label: Arhoolie; 1063
- Producer: Chris Strachwitz

Lightnin' Hopkins chronology
In the Key of Lightnin' (2002)	Lightning Hopkins in Berkeley (1972)	Po' Lightnin' (1983)

Lightning Hopkins in Berkeley is an album by blues musician Lightnin' Hopkins recorded in California in 1969 and originally released on the Arhoolie label in 1972. The original LP featured one side of previously unreleased recordings and the other six track which were originally released on Lightnin'!.

== Track listing ==
All compositions by Sam "Lightnin'" Hopkins

1. "Please Settle in Vietnam" – 4:15
2. "Up on Telegraph (Avenue)" – 3:14
3. "Wipe Your Feet on the Floor" – 2:38
4. "Send My Child Home to Me" – 4:12
5. "Selling Wine" – 3:08
6. "Brand New Look" – 3:16
7. "Have You Ever Loved a Woman" – 4:22 Originally released on Lightnin'!
8. "Little and Low" – 3:35 Originally released on Lightnin'!
9. "Hold Up Your Head" – 3:31 Originally released on Lightnin'!
10. "Good Times Here" – 2:41 Originally released on Lightnin'!
11. "Annie's Boogie" – 2:34 Originally released on Lightnin'!
12. "Black and Evil" – 3:11 Originally released on Lightnin'!
- Recorded in Berkeley, CA at Sierra Sound Laboratories on May 20, 1969 (tracks 7–12) and at Chris Strachwitz' House on December 8, 1969 (tracks 1–6)

== Personnel ==
=== Performance ===
- Lightnin' Hopkins – guitar, vocals
- Francis Clay – drums (tracks 7–12)

=== Production ===
- Chris Strachwitz – producer
