= Talkin' Some Sense =

Studio album by Lightnin' Hopkins
- Released: 1968
- Recorded: January 17, 1968
- Studio: ACA Recording Studios, Houston, TX
- Genre: Blues
- Length: 38:52
- Label: Jewel Records; LP/LPS 5001

Lightnin' Hopkins chronology
Texas Blues Man (1968)	Talkin' Some Sense (1968)	Free Form Patterns (1968)

Talkin' Some Sense, is an album by blues musician Lightnin' Hopkins recorded in Texas in 1968 and released on Stan Lewis' Jewel Records label.

Professional ratings
Review scores
Source	Rating
AllMusic	3/5 stars

== Track listing ==
All compositions by Sam "Lightnin'" Hopkins

1. "Long Way from Home" – 2:53
2. "I'm Tired of Trouble" – 3:44
3. "Vietnam War Pt. 1 & 2" – 4:18
4. "Lightnin' Strikes One More Time" – 2:55
5. "Walkin' Blues" – 3:19
6. "Talkin' Some Sense" – 2:50
7. "Lonesome Lightnin'" – 3:33
8. "My Suggestion" – 5:02
9. "Uncle Stan, the Hip Hit Record Man" – 2:45
10. "You're Gonna Miss Me" – 4:01
11. "The Purple Puppy" – 3:32

== Personnel ==
=== Performance ===
- Lightnin' Hopkins – guitar, vocals
- Billy Bizor – harmonica
- Elmore Nixon – piano
- Lawrence Evans – bass
- Unidentified musician – drums
