= Mojo Hand: The Life and Music of Lightnin' Hopkins =

2013 book by Timothy J. O'Brien and David Ensminger

- First edition
- Author: Timothy J. O'Brien; David Ensminger
- Language: English
- Subject: Lightnin' Hopkins
- Genre: Non-fiction
- Publisher: University of Texas Press
- Publication date: 2013
- Publication place: United States

Mojo Hand: The Life and Music of Lightnin' Hopkins is a 2013 book by Timothy J. O'Brien and David Ensminger about Lightnin' Hopkins, published by the University of Texas Press.

Bob Ruggiero of the Houston Chronicle described the book as the "second major [biography] on Hopkins."

== Background ==
O'Brien, of the University of Houston, originally set out to make a master's degree thesis on Hopkins. This later became a PhD thesis, and the thesis became the basis of the book, O'Brien, a White American man, felt that there had been insufficient scholarship on Hopkins. O'Brien died due to cancer by the time the book was published.

Ensminger, O'Brien's friend and from the Houston area, wrote Dial: Conversations with Punk Icons. His role was at first to help chart the course for the book, and later to assist O'Brien when the latter's health began to fail.

O'Brien used over 130 interviews as research for the book. In addition he used various archives, including some not open to the public. Records from the U.S. Census Bureau and the Social Security Administration as well as police departments, probate courts, and the offices of a record company headquartered in Berkeley, California were used. Ensminger conducted remaining work, including the interview of Robert “Skin Man” Murphy, after O'Brien died.

== Contents ==
The book has ten photographs, seven of which include Hopkins.

Ensminger stated "Our book focuses on the man, not the legend, and the circumstances, climate and conflicts that he navigated through tumultuous eras."

== Reception ==
Peter Thornell wrote that he believed that "only dedicated fans" would be served by the book, arguing that it did not cover much new ground even though it was "very informative". He stated that it was "slightly more academic" compared to Lightnin' Hopkins: His Life and Blues by Alan Govenar.

Donna Seaman wrote in Booklist that the book is a "comprehensively detailed and provocative biography brimming with vivid oral history".

Mick Lowell White wrote in the Journal of Texas Music History that it "is a useful and interesting book." White felt that at times there was too much relatively trivial detail and this prevented the reader from finding interesting information, even though this was "no doubt a reflection of the meticulous research done by the authors". He also criticized the "rudimentary" index, lack of a "critical discography", and a paucity of photographs.

Anne Jordan wrote in the East Texas Historical Journal that the book "reads well" and was not "tedious" despite the amount of research put into it. Jordan stated that she would have liked to have seen a discography.
