= Blue Lightnin' =

Studio album by Lightnin' Hopkins
- Released: 1967
- Recorded: 1965
- Studio: Robin Hood Studios, Tyler, TX
- Genre: Blues
- Length: 34:07
- Label: Jewel Records; LP/LPS 5000
- Producer: Stan Lewis

Lightnin' Hopkins chronology
The King of the Blues (1965)	Blue Lightnin' (1967)	Live at Newport (2002)

Blue Lightnin' is an album by blues musician Lightnin' Hopkins recorded in Texas in 1965 and released on Stan Lewis' Jewel Records label in 1967.

== Reception ==
Professional ratings
Review scores
Source	Rating
AllMusic	2.5/5 stars

AllMusic reviewer Bill Dahl stated: "After a slew of albums aimed primarily at the folk-blues audience that resuscitated his flagging career during the early '60s, Lightnin' Hopkins attempted to regain his original fan base with these unpretentious 1965 sessions for Stan Lewis' Jewel logo. Pretty convincingly, too,".

== Track listing ==
All compositions credited to Sam "Lightnin'" Hopkins and Stan Lewis except where noted

1. "Found My Baby Crying" – 3:55
2. "Move on Out, Part One" – 2:59
3. "Back Door Friend" – 3:56
4. "Fishing Clothes" – 3:37
5. "Morning Blues" – 4:36
6. "Gambler's Blues" – 3:58
7. "Wig Wearing Woman" – 3:42
8. "Lonesome Dog Blues" (Hopkins) – 2:38
9. "Last Affair" (Hopkins) – 2:56
10. "Move on Out, Part Two" – 3:00

== Personnel ==
=== Performance ===
- Lightnin' Hopkins – guitar, vocals

=== Production ===
- Stan Lewis – producer
