= Lightnin' Strikes (Vee-Jay album) =

Studio album by Lightnin' Hopkins
- Released: May 26, 1962
- Recorded: 1962
- Studio: Gold Star (Houston, Texas)
- Genre: Blues
- Length: 31:53
- Label: Vee-Jay; VJLP 1044

Lightnin' Hopkins chronology
Smokes Like Lightning (1962)	Lightnin' Strikes (1962)	Hootin' the Blues (1962)

Lightnin' Strikes is an album by the blues musician Lightnin' Hopkins, recorded in Texas in 1962 and released on the Vee-Jay label.

== Reception ==
Professional ratings
Review scores
Source	Rating
AllMusic	3/5 stars
The Penguin Guide to Blues Recordings	3/4 stars

The Penguin Guide to Blues Recordings wrote: "Creatively speaking, this is Lightnin' on no more than good form, rising to very good indeed in 'Walking Round in Circles', but the sonic effects lend the music a strangeness that some listeners may find attractive". AllMusic reviewer Cub Koda stated: "This brings together some early-'60s sides that Hopkins recorded for the Chicago-based Vee-Jay label, although all of them were recorded in his native Houston. ... two are full-band tracks produced by drummer King Ivory Lee Semiens with Lightnin' playing electric, the band following his erratic timing as best as they can".

== Track listing ==
All compositions credited to Bill Quinn and Lola Anne Cullen except where noted

1. "Got Me a Louisiana Woman" (Sam Hopkins, Ivory Lee Semien) – 3:02
2. "Want to Come Home" – 3:55
3. "Please Don't Quit Me" – 3:09
4. "Devil Is Watching You" – 3:57
5. "Rolling and Rolling" – 2:56
6. "War Is Starting Again" (Hopkins, Semien) – 3:02
7. "Walkin' Round in Circles" – 3:02
8. "Mary Lou" – 3:13
9. "Heavy Snow" – 3:31
10. "Coon Is Hard to Catch" – 4:10

== Personnel ==
=== Performance ===
- Lightnin' Hopkins – guitar, electric guitar, vocals
- Other unidentified musicians (tracks 1 & 6)
