= The King of the Blues =

Studio album by Lightnin' Hopkins
- Released: 1965
- Recorded: December 1964
- Studio: Houston, Texas
- Genre: Blues
- Length: 35:30
- Label: Pickwick/33; PC-3013

Lightnin' Hopkins chronology
My Life in the Blues (1965)	The King of the Blues (1965)	Blue Lightnin' (1965)

The King of the Blues is an album by blues musician Lightnin' Hopkins recorded in Texas in late 1964 and released on the Pickwick/33 label. The album was also released as Let's Work Awhile on Blue Horizon in 1971.

== Track listing ==
All compositions by Sam "Lightnin'" Hopkins

1. "This Time We're Gonna Try" – 3:58
2. "Christmas Time Is Coming" – 3:52
3. "Come On Baby, Let's Work Awhile" – 3:13
4. "The Jet" – 3:26
5. "I Don't Need You Woman" – 3:50
6. "I Wish I Was a Baby" – 3:36
7. "The Crazy Song" – 3:06
8. "Lightnin's Love" – 4:48
9. "Take It If You Want To" – 2:35
10. "How Have You Been?" – 4:06

== Personnel ==
- Lightnin' Hopkins – guitar, vocals
