= Lightning Hopkins with His Brothers Joel and John Henry / with Barbara Dane =

Album by Lightnin' Hopkins

Live album by Lightnin' Hopkins, Joel Hopkins, John Henry Hopkins and Barbara Dane
- Released: 1966
- Recorded: February 1964 and June 18, 1964
- Venue: Waxahachie, TX and The Cabale, Berkeley, CA
- Genre: Blues
- Length: 42:09
- Label: Arhoolie; F 1022
- Producer: Chris Strachwitz

Lightnin' Hopkins chronology
Soul Blues (1965)	Lightning Hopkins with His Brothers Joel and John Henry / with Barbara Dane (1966)	My Life in the Blues (1965)

Lightning Hopkins with His Brothers Joel and John Henry / with Barbara Dane is an album by blues musician Lightnin' Hopkins recorded in Texas and California in 1964 and released on the Arhoolie label. The original album was split with one side featuring tracks with Hopkins and His Brothers and the other performances with Barbara Dane. In 1991 through Smithsonian Folkways, Arhoolie released the Hopkins Brothers tracks on CD as The Hopkins Brothers: Joel, Lightning & John Henry with additional unreleased recordings, then in 1994 the tracks with Barbara Dane were released as Sometimes I Believe She Loves Me with unreleased tracks.

== Track listing ==
All compositions by Sam "Lightnin'" Hopkins except where noted

=== Side one ===
1. "See About My Brother John Henry" – 4:19
2. "Hot Blooded Woman" (John Henry Hopkins) – 2:03
3. "Black Hannah" – 6:00
4. "I Walked from Dallas" (Joel Hopkins) – 3:47
5. "Going Back to Baden-Baden" – 4:18

=== Side two ===
1. "Sometimes She Loves Me" – 4:51
2. "You Got Another Man" – 3:38
3. "I'm Going Back, Baby" (Hopkins, Barbara Dane) – 5:28
4. "Mother Earth" – 5:36
5. "Jesus Won't You Come By Here" (Traditional) – 2:07
- Recorded in Waxahachie, Texas, in February 1964 (tracks 1–5) and at The Cabale, Berkeley, California, on June 18, 1964 (tracks 6–10)

== Personnel ==
=== Performance ===
- Lightnin' Hopkins – guitar, vocals
- John Henry Hopkins – guitar, vocals (Side One)
- Joel Hopkins – guitar, vocals (Side One)
- Barbara Dane – guitar, vocals (Side Two)

=== Production ===
- Chris Strachwitz – producer
