= Blues Beacon Records =

German record label

- Parent company: Enja Records
- Founded: 4 November 1977
- Founder: Matthias Winckelmann; Horst Weber
- Genre: Blues (early), jazz (present)
- Country of origin: Germany
- Location: Geretsried

Blues Beacon is a German independent record label, founded in the 1970s in Munich by Matthias Winckelmann and Horst Weber to record blues artists while touring Europe, e.g. Robert Pete Williams, Little Brother Montgomery, Bukka White, Thomas Shaw. Blues Beacon today is a sub-label of Enja Records, specialising in jazz and world music. The early Blues Beacon recordings were issued on CD in the 1990s, few of them today are still part of the "Enja" catalogue.
