= J. T. Smith (musician) =

American guitarist, singer and songwriter

- Also known as: The Howling Wolf "Funny Papa" Smith "Funny Paper" Smith; Howling Smith
- Born: John T. Smith or Otis Cook between 1885 and 1890, or c. 1910; Texas, U.S.
- Died: possibly 1940, or 1979
- Genres: Texas blues; Blues
- Occupations: Singer-songwriter; Musician
- Instruments: Vocal; Guitar
- Years active: 1920s – 1939
- Label: Vocalion

John T. Smith (between 1885 and 1890 – possibly 1940, or c. 1910 – 1979), variously known as the Howling Wolf, (Note: Not related to Chester Arthur Burnett, widely known as Howlin' Wolf.) "Funny Papa" Smith, "Funny Paper" Smith, and Howling Smith, was an American blues guitarist, singer and songwriter. Little is known about Smith, and some reported details of his life may be apocryphal. He was a busking street musician in Texas, Louisiana, and Oklahoma; Smith played at parties, juke joints, and fish fries. He released around ten singles in his own name, or variants thereof. He also recorded with Bernice Edwards, Black Boy Shine, Magnolia Harris, and Dessa Foster. His best-known song was "Howling Wolf Blues", of which several variants were recorded. Many of his original recordings were unreleased at the time; he had a brief recording career with Vocalion Records. All are now available on compilation albums.

Smith's music has been compared to that of Blind Lemon Jefferson, and his guitar playing was similar in style to that of other Texas guitarists around in his lifetime. One factor that set him apart from his contemporaries was his lyrical compositions, which were highly original. On more than one occasion, his verses were so full that he had to split the song between both sides of the three-minute limitation imposed by the standard 10" 78-rpm disc.

On occasion the recording company would call him "The Howlin Wolf". Chester Burnett, who became more widely known as Howlin' Wolf, claimed he had heard of Smith, but he did not get his nickname from him.

== Life and career ==
Smith's birth date is not known for certainty, but he may have been born in the 1880s or so, as the child of Amos Smith and Hattie Webb, and to have been born in east Texas. The Texas State Historical Association gives his birth year as "between 1885 and 1890". Researcher Bob Eagle, however, suggests that he was born around 1910 in Bastrop County, Texas.

His first professional role involved him working at the Lincoln Theater in New York City. He married in the 1920s and spent most of the decade as an itinerant musician, travelling around Texas and Oklahoma, performing at parties, fish fries and juke joints, often in the company of Thomas Shaw, Alger "Texas" Alexander, and Little Hat Jones. He also was seen in the Dallas, Texas, area in the 1920s and 1930s, but he never recorded there. His first recordings were made in Chicago on September 18 and 19, 1930. "Howling Wolf Blues" (parts one and two) was issued by Vocalion (Vocalion 1558) as his first single. Several sources have noted that his guitar was often out of tune, even on some of his recordings, and Shaw commented that Smith was not an accomplished guitarist. Another oddity was that although Smith called himself "Funny Papa", his record label Vocalion managed to mistake this for "Funny Paper" Smith, and that is how he was billed on his earliest releases. He recorded almost twenty songs for Vocalion in 1930 and 1931, including the aforementioned "Howling Wolf Blues", from which he acquired another pseudonym, "The Howling Wolf".

Smith reportedly wore a stovepipe hat with "Funny Papa Smith" stitched upon it. Between September 1930 and April 1935, he recorded forty-one songs, but only half that number were released at that time. Around this time he performed on weekends with Thomas Shaw.

=== Conviction ===
In 1931, Smith was arrested after being involved in a fight in a gambling establishment and allegedly killing a man in an argument over a woman. He was jailed on a charge of murder and spent a few years in a Texas penitentiary.

=== Later recordings ===
In 1935, he recorded some songs for the Vocalion label in Fort Worth, Texas, but they were not released. Along the way he recorded with Bernice Edwards, Black Boy Shine, Magnolia Harris, and Dessa Foster. More than one source noted that Magnolia Harris was probably a pseudonym for the contractually obliged Victoria Spivey. He toured Texas with Alger "Texas" Alexander in 1939.

=== Death ===
It has been reported that he died in 1940, but the blues historians Bob Eagle and Eric S. LeBlanc reckoned in their published research that it was "after 1947". Eagle later suggested that, in fact, Smith died in Bastrop County, Texas, in 1979.
