= Early Recordings (Lightnin' Hopkins album) =

Compilation album by Lightnin' Hopkins
- Released: 1965
- Recorded: 1946–50
- Studio: Gold Star (Houston, Texas)
- Genre: Blues
- Length: 45:52
- Label: Arhoolie
- Compiler: Chris Strachwitz

Lightnin' Hopkins chronology
Early Recordings (1965)	Early Recordings Vol. 2 (1971)

Early Recordings is an album by the blues musician Lightnin' Hopkins featuring tracks recorded at Gold Star Studios in Houston, Texas between 1946 and 1950, eight of which were originally released as 10-inch 78 rpm records on the Gold Star and Jax labels, along with eight others that were previously unissued. Arhoolie reissued The Gold Star Sessions on two CDs through Smithsonian Folkways in 1990.

== Reception ==
Professional ratings
Review scores
Source	Rating
AllMusic	3/5 stars

AllMusic reviewer Eugene Chadbourne stated: "Much of the body of this blues artist's song catalog kind of runs together into a long odyssey, delivered in a rubato medium feel, sometimes locking into a steady beat but often hovering somewhere behind and ahead. As if performing an endless series of card tricks with only three cards, he comes up with variation after variation on the basic 12-bar form and a series of blues riffs that he has ready to fit any and all occasions. Listeners may not be able to tell one track from the next, but Hopkins' feel on guitar and charismatic, lilting voice has proven to be a winner with blues fans decade after decade. The ever adventuresome Hopkins cut some tracks on organ during this period ... Although the resulting 'Organ Boogie' certainly provides some variety, the songs with the guitar are of much more lasting music value, the organ numbers mostly of interest as an oddity".

== Track listing ==
All compositions by Sam "Lightnin'" Hopkins

1. "Bluebird Blues" aka "Glory Be Blues" – 3:11 previously unreleased
2. "Walking Blues" – 2:47
3. "Unkind Blues" – 3:00
4. "Mad With You" – 2:32
5. "Somebody's Got to Go" a.k.a. "Goodbye Blues" – 2:43 previously unreleased
6. "Automobile Blues" – 2:47
7. "Seems Funny Baby" – 3:03 previously unreleased
8. "Coolin' Board Blues" a.k.a. "Thunder and Lightnin' Blues" – 2:43 previously unreleased
9. "Airplane Blues" – 2:42
10. "Loretta Blues" – 2:45 previously unreleased
11. "Whiskey Blues" – 2:42 previously unreleased
12. "You Don't Know" – 2:43
13. "Organ Boogie" – 2:59 previously unreleased
14. "What Can It Be" – 2:39
15. "Ida Mae" – 2:40
16. "Goin' Back and Talk to Mama" – 2:56 previously unreleased

== Personnel ==
- Lightnin' Hopkins – guitar, vocals, organ
