= Texas Alexander =

American blues singer (1900–1954)

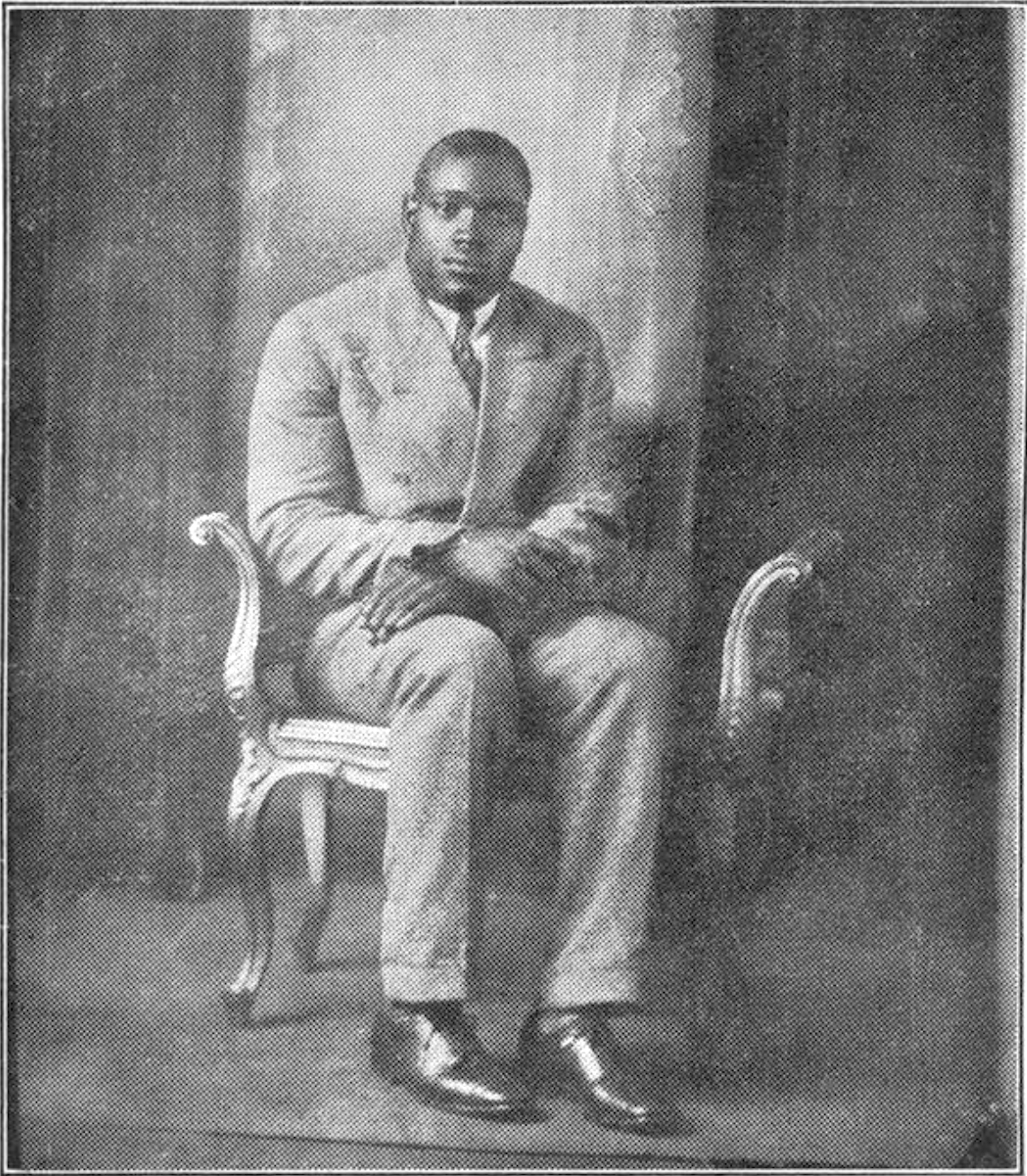
- Alexander in 1925

Background information
- Also known as: Texas Alexander
- Born: Alger Alexander; September 12, 1900; Jewett, Texas, U.S.
- Died: April 18, 1954 (aged 53) Richards, Texas, U.S.
- Genres: Country blues, Texas blues, blues
- Instruments: Vocals, guitar
- Years active: 1927–1950

Alger "Texas" Alexander (September 12, 1900 – April 18, 1954) was an American blues singer from Jewett, Texas. Some sources claim that he was the cousin of Lightnin' Hopkins, but no direct kinship has been established. It has also been asserted that he was the uncle of the Texas country blues guitarist Frankie Lee Sims.

== Career ==
A short man with a big, deep voice, Alexander started his career performing on the streets and at parties and picnics in the Brazos River bottomlands, where he sometimes worked with Blind Lemon Jefferson. In 1927, he began a recording career that continued into the 1930s, recording sides for Okeh Records and Vocalion Records in New York, San Antonio, and Fort Worth.

Songs he recorded include "Mama's Bad Luck Child," "Sittin' on a Log," "Texas Special," "Broken Yo Yo" and "Don't You Wish Your Baby Was Built Up Like Mine?"

His early records for Okeh are notable not only for the originality of his songs but also for the musical motifs against which they are set. On April 9, 1934, Alexander recorded with backing by the Mississippi Sheiks. Their line-up featured Bo Carter on violin and Sam Chatman and Walter Vinson on guitar. The eight tracks recorded included "Seen Better Days" and "Frost Texas Tornado Blues", the latter of which told of the tornado which destroyed Frost, Texas, on May 6, 1930, leaving 41 dead.

Alexander did not play a musical instrument, and over the years he worked with a number of other artists, including King Oliver, Eddie Lang, Lonnie Johnson, Little Hat Jones, the Mississippi Sheiks, J. T. Smith, and Lightnin' Hopkins. He sang in the free rhythm of work songs, such as the migrant cotton pickers he performed for might have sung, which posed a challenge for those accompanying him. The rhythm of his singing is often difficult to follow, and on his records his accompanists can often be heard resetting their watches to "Alexander time". Lonnie Johnson devised free-form guitar melodies in counterpoint to Alexander's vocal lines.

Alexander allegedly murdered his wife in 1939 and was imprisoned in the state penitentiary in Paris, Texas, from 1940 to 1945. Research by Coy Prather published in the spring 2014 issue of Texas Music Magazine revealed that the often-printed story of his prison term may be a myth. There are no records that Alexander ever served a sentence in a Texas prison, and there was never a prison in Paris. Prather believed Alexander may have served time on a county work farm for playing lewd music in public.

After 1945, Alexander returned to performing and recording. His last recording was made in 1950 with Benton's Busy Bees, with Leon Benton on guitar and Buster Pickens on piano.

Alexander died of syphilis in 1954, at the age of 53. He was buried in Longstreet Cemetery, in Montgomery County, Texas. In 2013 the Killer Blues Headstone Project placed a headstone for him there.

== Discography ==
- Buddy Boy Hawkins and his Buddies 1934 recording of "Easy Rider Blues" (Yazoo, 1968)
- Texas Troublesome Blues (Agram, 1982)
- Complete Recordings, vols. 1–4 (Matchbox, 1982–1990)
- Complete Recordings in Chronological Order, vols. 1–3 (Document, 1993–1994)
- 98 Degree Blues (Catfish, 1999)

== See also ==
- Kokomo Records
- List of blues musicians
- List of country blues musicians
- List of electric blues musicians
- List of Texas blues musicians
