= Thomas Shaw (blues musician) =

American blues singer and guitarist (1908–1977)

Thomas Edgar Shaw (March 4, 1908 – February 24, 1977) was an American blues singer and guitarist.

== Biography ==
Shaw was born in Brenham, Texas, United States. He was taught to play both the harmonica and guitar by his relatives, and based his style on his collaborations with Blind Lemon Jefferson, J. T. Smith and Ramblin' Thomas. After spending time as an itinerant musician in Texas, in 1934 he relocated to California. He continued to perform and appeared on radio, before setting up his own club which he operated for many years. By the 1960s, Shaw had been ordained as a minister in a church in San Diego, California, and found a rediscovery of his own during the blues revival.

In the 1960s and 1970s, he recorded for the Advent, Blue Goose and Blues Beacon labels. In addition, Shaw appeared at festivals and, in 1972, he toured in Europe. He recorded "Hey Mr. Nixon" and "Martin Luther King".

Shaw died during open heart surgery in San Diego, in February 1977, aged 69.
