= Texas Blues Man =

Studio album by Lightnin' Hopkins
- Released: 1968
- Recorded: December 18, 1967
- Studio: Houston, TX
- Genre: Blues
- Length: 37:56
- Label: Arhoolie; F 1034
- Producer: Chris Strachwitz

Lightnin' Hopkins chronology
Something Blue (1967)	Texas Blues Man (1968)	Talkin' Some Sense (1968)

Texas Blues Man is an album by the blues musician Lightnin' Hopkins, recorded in Texas in late 1967 and released on the Arhoolie label.

== Reception ==
Professional ratings
Review scores
Source	Rating
AllMusic	3/5 stars
The Penguin Guide to Blues Recordings	3/4 stars

The Penguin Guide to Blues Recordings wrote that the album contains "powerful performances with a resonant electric guitar filling the studio," but that "it was no more than an average Hopkins album."

== Track listing ==
All compositions by Sam "Lightnin'" Hopkins

1. "Tom Moore Blues" – 5:01
2. "Watch My Fingers" – 2:48
3. "Little Antoinette" – 3:38
4. "Love Like a Hydrant" – 3:58
5. "Cut Me Out Baby" – 3:27
6. "Take a Walk" – 2:37
7. "Slavery" – 5:29
8. "I Would If I Could" – 3:19
9. "Bud Russell Blues" – 4:32
10. "At Home Blues" – 3:07

== Personnel ==
=== Performance ===
- Lightnin' Hopkins – guitar, vocals

=== Production ===
- Chris Strachwitz – producer
