= Paul Oliver =

English architectural historian and blues music writer (1927–2017)

- Oliver at Oxford Brookes University
- Born: Paul Hereford Oliver; 25 May 1927; Nottingham, England
- Died: 15 August 2017 (aged 90); Shipton-under-Wychwood, Oxfordshire, England
- Occupations: Architectural historian, blues historian, graphic designer, teacher
- Spouse: Valerie Coxon (m. 1950; died 2002)

Paul Hereford Oliver MBE (25 May 1927 – 15 August 2017) was an English architectural historian and writer on the blues and other forms of African-American music. He was equally distinguished in both fields, although it is likely that aficionados of one of his specialties were not aware of his expertise in the other. He wrote some of the first scholarly studies of blues music, and his commentary and research have been influential.

== Early life and career ==
Oliver was born in Nottingham in 1927, the son of architect W. Norman Oliver. In the late 1930s, his family lived in Pinner, Middlesex, where he attended Longfield Primary School in Rayners Lane and then went to Harrow County School for Boys between 1938 and 1942.

He attended Harrow Art School, where he met his wife, Valerie. He initially trained as a painter and sculptor, but because of allergies to some art materials concentrated on graphic design. After a period in the War Office, Oliver gained his Art Teacher's Diploma at Goldsmiths College at the University of London. He then taught art in two secondary schools, and was Head of Art at Harrow County School for Boys from 1949 to 1960. When there he formed a jazz club in which he played his blues records, and also played mandolin in a skiffle group.

In the early 1950s, Oliver wrote to Decca Records to complain about the design of their record sleeves, and was hired as an illustrator, his first work being seen on the 1954 album Backwoods Blues. He designed many blues album sleeves in the 1950s, but was usually uncredited. After taking up the post of drawing master at London's Architectural Association School, he left in 1973 to lead the Art and Design department at Dartington College of Arts. In 1978, he joined the architecture department at Oxford Polytechnic, which was renamed Oxford Brookes in 1992.

== Work as architectural historian ==
Oliver started work as an artist at the Architectural Association in 1960, and after a few years began teaching the history of architecture. From the early 1960s, he studied vernacular architecture traditions around the world, particularly stimulated by a trip to Ghana in 1964 to research appropriate housing for people displaced after the building of the Akosombo Dam. He argued that vernacular architecture will be necessary in the future to "ensure sustainability in both cultural and economic terms beyond the short term." He wrote many books on vernacular architecture, and was well known for his 1997 work Encyclopedia of Vernacular Architecture of the World. Spanning three volumes and 2500 pages, it includes contributions from researchers from 80 countries. In 2003, he was awarded the MBE for services to architectural education.

He became a researcher at the Oxford Institute for Sustainable Development (Department of Architecture, Oxford Brookes University), and from 1978 to 1988 was Associate Head of the School of Architecture. He was an Honorary Fellow of the Royal Institute of British Architects (1999) and was awarded an honorary doctorate by the University of Gloucestershire (2007).

== Blues historian ==
Oliver was a leading authority on the blues and gospel music, described in the New York Times as "a scrupulous researcher with a fluent writing style, [who] opened the eyes of readers in Britain and the United States to a musical form that had been overlooked and often belittled." He published his first article in Jazz Journal in 1952. His first book on the blues, a biography of Bessie Smith, was published in 1959, followed by Blues Fell this Morning: The Meaning of the Blues in 1960. The latter book was "one of the first efforts to examine closely the music's language and subject matter."

His studies of American traditional music did much to spread interest in the blues, and included early research into the influence of Islamic music from North Africa on its origins. His work, which began in the 1950s, included interviews, field work and research in recording and printed sources tracing the origin and development of African-American music and culture from the time of slavery and before. Paul Oliver's Archive of African American Music is held at Oxford Brookes University Special Collections and Archive.

He made several trips to the US in the 1960s to interview and record blues musicians, financed by the State Department and the BBC. Many of his interviews were transcribed in Conversation with the Blues (1965). In 1969 he published The Story of the Blues, "the first comprehensive history of the genre", followed by several other books covering all aspects of blues music. His unfinished research with Mack McCormick on Texas blues was published in 2019 by Texas A&M University Press as The Blues Come to Texas.

== Personal life and death ==
He married Valerie Coxon in 1950; she died in 2002. They had no children. Oliver died from complications of dementia at a care home in Shipton-under-Wychwood, Oxfordshire, on 15 August 2017.

== Selected bibliography ==
=== Architectural writings ===
- Shelter and Society. London: Barrie & Jenkins. 1969. ISBN 0-21466796-0.
- Dunroamin: The Suburban Semi and its Enemies. London: Barrie & Jenkins. 9 November 1981. p. 31. ISBN 978-0-09145930-7. (with Ian Davis and Ian Bentley)
- Dwellings: The House Across the World. Oxford: Phaidon. 1987. ISBN 0-7148-2443-7.
- Encyclopedia of Vernacular Architecture of the World. Cambridge University Press. 1997. ISBN 0-521-56422-0.
- Built to Meet Needs: Cultural Issues in Vernacular Architecture. Elsevier. 2006. ISBN 0-7506-6657-9.
- Atlas of Vernacular Architecture of the World. Routledge. 2008. ISBN 978-0-415-41151-6. (with Marcel Vellinga and Alexander Bridge)

=== Blues books ===
- Bessie Smith. London: Cassell. 1959.
- Blues Fell This Morning: The Meaning Of The Blues. London: Cassell. 1960. ISBN 3-85445-065-6.
  Revised edition: Blues Fell this Morning: Meaning In The Blues. Cambridge University Press. 1990. ISBN 0-521-37793-5.
- Conversation with the Blues. London: Cassell. 1965. ISBN 3-85445-065-6.
- Screening the Blues: Aspects of the Blues Tradition. London: Cassell. 1968. ISBN 0-304-93137-3.
- The Story of the Blues. London: Barrie & Jenkins. 1969. ISBN 3-85445-092-3. Selected tracks discussed in the book were issued on a CBS album of the same title.
- Savannah Syncopators: African Retentions in the Blues. London: Studio Vista. 1970. ISBN 0-289-79828-0.
- Songsters and Saints: Vocal Traditions on Race Records. Cambridge University Press. 1984. ISBN 0-521-24827-2.
- Blues Off the Record: Thirty Years of Blues Commentary. Tunbridge Wells: Baton Press. 1984. ISBN 0-306-80321-6.
- The Blackwell guide to blues records. Oxford: Basil Blackwell Ltd. 1989. ISBN 0-631-16516-9. (Editor)
- Broadcasting the Blues: Black Blues in the Segregation Era. New York and Abingdon-on-Thames: Routledge. 2006. ISBN 0-415-97177-2.
- Barrelhouse Blues: Location Recordings and the Early Traditions of the Blues. London: Basic Civitas. 2009. ISBN 978-0-465-00881-0.
- Govenar, Alan, ed. (2019). The Blues Come to Texas: Paul Oliver and Mack McCormick's Unfinished Book. College Station: Texas A&M University Press. ISBN 978-1-62349-638-8. (with Mack McCormick)
