= Mack McCormick =

American folklorist and musicologist (1930–2015)

- McCormick in Houston, December 2013
- Born: Robert Burton McCormick; August 3, 1930; Pittsburgh, Pennsylvania, U.S.
- Died: November 18, 2015 (aged 85); Houston, Texas, U.S.
- Occupations: Musicologist, folklorist

Robert Burton "Mack" McCormick (August 3, 1930 – November 18, 2015) was an American musicologist and folklorist. McCormick conducted extensive research into the history of the blues and assembled the material for a major biography of Robert Johnson. The biography was finally published eight years after McCormick’s death.

== Biography ==
McCormick was born in 1930 in Pittsburgh, Pennsylvania. He was brought up by his mother, in Alabama, Colorado, West Virginia and Texas, as she traveled to find work as a hospital technician.

=== Career ===
He dropped out of high school to work at a ballroom in Cedar Point, Ohio, running errands for the musicians performing there. He later worked as an electrician, cook, carnival worker and taxi driver. In 1946, he met record store owner and discographer Orin Blackstone in New Orleans and began assisting him in researching and compiling Blackstone's multivolume Index to Jazz. McCormick became Texas correspondent for Down Beat in 1949. He developed an interest in blues and began traveling and researching the lives and origins of undocumented blues musicians around the country and learning about folk traditions and customs.

McCormick supported himself by taking a job with the United States Census Bureau, specifically requesting a posting to the Fourth Ward, Houston. This was a historic African-American neighborhood, settled by freed slaves who migrated there from all over the southern states. McCormick believed the neighborhood would be rich in African-American musicians and a rewarding place to track down rare blues records.

In the late 1950s, McCormick "discovered" and recorded Mance Lipscomb, Robert Shaw and Lightnin' Hopkins. At the 1965 Newport Folk Festival, he assembled a group of former convicts who had never performed together, and after trying but failing to get Bob Dylan to end his rehearsals with members of the Paul Butterfield Blues Band, cut off Dylan's electricity supply, possibly giving rise to the apocryphal story that Pete Seeger had attempted to cut the power with an axe during Dylan's debut performance with electric guitars and keyboards.

McCormick wrote numerous magazine articles and album liner notes and assembled an extensive private archive of Texas musical history. He researched the lives of blues musicians, including Robert Johnson and Henry Thomas. He began research on Johnson in 1968, while working for the Smithsonian Institution. McCormick intended to publish his research as a book, Biography of a Phantom, and uncovered a huge amount of fresh material, including discovering Johnson's living relatives and previously unknown photos of the musician. During McCormick's lifetime the biography remained unpublished. McCormick claimed he had lost interest in it. but he was also frustrated by recurring bouts of bipolar disorder. The book Biography of a Phantom: A Robert Johnson Blues Odyssey, edited by John W. Troutman, was finally published by Smithsonian Books in 2023.

McCormick's unfinished research with Paul Oliver on Texas blues was published in 2019 by Texas A&M University Press as The Blues Come to Texas.

McCormick died on November 18, 2015, in Houston, Texas, from esophageal cancer, at the age of 85.

== Archives ==
In 2022, it was announced that McCormick's archive, including 590 reels of sound recordings, unpublished manuscripts, photographs, playbills, booking contracts, and miscellaneous materials and ephemera concerning blues musicians would be housed at the Smithsonian’s Museum of American History.

Beginning in 2023, Smithsonian Folkways began releasing some of McCormick's previously unreleased recordings as Playing for the Man at the Door: Field Recordings from the Collection of Mack McCormick, 1958–1971.

== Bibliography ==
- Oliver, Paul; McCormick, Mack (2019). The Blues Come to Texas: Paul Oliver and Mack McCormick's Unfinished Book. College Station. ISBN 978-1623496388.
- McCormick, Mack (2023). Biography of a Phantom: A Robert Johnson Blues Odyssey. Washington. ISBN 978-1588347343.
