= Bluesville Records =

American blues record label

Bluesville Records was an American record label subsidiary of Prestige Records, launched in 1959, with the primary purpose of documenting the work of the older classic bluesmen passed over by the changing audience. Such bluesmen as Roosevelt Sykes, Lightnin' Hopkins, Rev. Gary Davis, and Sonny Terry and Brownie McGhee recorded for the label, accounting for more than one quarter of their overall output. By 1966, Bluesville had ceased to issue LPs.

== Discography ==
Catalog No.	Artist	Album	Notes
BVLP 1001	Al Smith	Hear My Blues	
BVLP 1002	Brownie McGhee and Sonny Terry	Down Home Blues	
BVLP 1003	Willie Dixon	Willie's Blues	
BVLP 1004	Mildred Anderson	Person to Person	
BVLP 1005	Brownie McGhee and Sonny Terry	Blues & Folk	
BVLP 1006	Roosevelt Sykes	The Return of Roosevelt Sykes	
BVLP 1007	Lonnie Johnson	Blues by Lonnie Johnson	
BVLP 1008	Shakey Jake	Good Times	
BVLP 1009	The Prestige All Stars	Soul Jazz Volume One	Compilation of tracks from Prestige PRLP 7130, PRLP 7081 & PRLP 7035
BVLP 1010	The Prestige All Stars	Soul Jazz Volume Two	Compilation of tracks from Prestige PRLP 7132, PRLP 7164, PRLP 7161 & PRLP 7162
BVLP 1011	Lonnie Johnson with Elmer Snowden	Blues & Ballads	
BVLP 1012	Little Brother Montgomery	Tasty Blues	
BVLP 1013	Al Smith	Midnight Special	
BVLP 1014	Roosevelt Sykes	The Honeydripper	
BVLP 1015	Blind Gary Davis	Harlem Street Singer	
BVLP 1016	Sunnyland Slim	Slim's Shout	
BVLP 1017	Mildred Anderson	No More in Life	
BVLP 1018	Memphis Slim	Just Blues	
BVLP 1019	Lightnin' Hopkins	Lightnin'	
BVLP 1020	Brownie McGhee and Sonny Terry	Blues All Around My Head	
BVLP 1021	Arbee Stidham	Tired of Wandering	
BVLP 1022	Curtis Jones	Trouble Blues	
BVLP 1023	K. C. Douglas	K. C.'s Blues	
BVLP 1024	Lonnie Johnson	Losing Game	
BVLP 1025	Sonny Terry	Sonny's Story	
BVLP 1026	Robert Pete Williams	Free Again	
BVLP 1027	Shakey Jake	Mouth Harp Blues	
BVLP 1028	St. Louis Jimmy	Going Down Slow	
BVLP 1029	Lightnin' Hopkins with Sonny Terry	Last Night Blues	
BVLP 1030	Tampa Red	Don't Tampa with the Blues	
BVLP 1031	Memphis Slim	No Strain	
BVLP 1032	Reverend Gary Davis	A Little More Faith	
BVLP 1033	Brownie McGhee and Sonny Terry	Blues in My Soul	
BVLP 1034	Memphis Willie B.	Introducing Memphis Willie B.	
BVLP 1035	Sidney Maiden	Trouble an' Blues	
BVLP 1036	Furry Lewis	Back on My Feet Again	
BVLP 1037	Furry Lewis	Done Changed My Mind	
BVLP 1038	Pink Anderson	Carolina Blues Man	
BVLP 1039	Mercy Dee Walton	A Pity and a Shame	
BVLP 1040	Blind Willie McTell	Last Session	
BVLP 1041	Henry Townsend	Tired of Bein' Mistreated	
BVLP 1042	Brownie McGhee	Brownie's Blues	
BVLP 1043	Tampa Red	Don't Jive Me	
BVLP 1044	Lonnie Johnson with Victoria Spivey	Idle Hours	
BVLP 1045	Lightnin' Hopkins	Blues in My Bottle	
BVLP 1046	Blind Snooks Eaglin	That's All Right	
BVLP 1047	Scrapper Blackwell	Mr. Scrapper's Blues	
BVLP 1048	Memphis Willie B.	Hard Working Man Blues	
BVLP 1049	Reverend Gary Davis	Say No to the Devil	
BVLP 1050	K. C. Douglas	Big Road Blues	
BVLP 1051	Pink Anderson	Medicine Show Man	
BVLP 1052	Alberta Hunter / Lucille Hegamin / Victoria Spivey	Songs We Taught Your Mother	
BVLP 1053	Memphis Slim	All Kinds of Blues	
BVLP 1054	Victoria Spivey with Lonnie Johnson	Woman Blues	
BVLP 1055	Memphis Slim / Tampa Red / Lonnie Johnson	Bawdy Blues	
BVLP 1056	Big Joe Williams	Blues for Nine Strings	
BVLP 1057	Lightnin' Hopkins	Walkin' This Road by Myself	
BVLP 1058	Brownie McGhee and Sonny Terry	Brownie McGhee and Sonny Terry at The 2nd Fret	
BVLP 1059	Sonny Terry	Sonny Is King	
BVLP 1060	Wade Walton	Shake 'Em On Down	
BVLP 1061	Lightnin' Hopkins	Lightnin' and Co.	
BVLP 1062	Lonnie Johnson	Another Night to Cry	
BVLP 1063	Smoky Babe	Hottest Brand Goin'	
BVLP 1064	Robert Curtis Smith	Clarksdale Blues	
BVLP 1065	Doug Quattlebaum	Softee Man Blues	
BVLP 1066	Clarence Clay and William Scott	The New Gospel Keys	
BVLP 1067	Big Joe Williams	Big Joe Williams at Folk City	
BVLP 1068	Pete Franklin	Guitar Pete's Blues	
BVLP 1069	Al Smith	Hear My Blues	Reissue of BVLP 1001
BVLP 1070	Lightnin' Hopkins	Smokes Like Lightning	
BVLP 1071	Pink Anderson	The Blues of Pink Anderson: Ballad & Folksinger	
BVLP 1072	Baby Tate	See What You Done Done	
BVLP 1073	Lightnin' Hopkins	Goin' Away	
BVLP 1074	Brooks Berry and Scrapper Blackwell	My Heart Struck Sorrow	
BVLP 1075	Memphis Slim	Steady Rolling Blues	
BVLP 1076	Alec Seward	Creepin' Blues	
BVLP 1077	J. T. Adams and Shirley Griffith	Indiana Avenue Blues	
BVLP 1078	Ravi Shankar and Ali Akbar Khan	The Master Musicians of India	
BVLP 1079	Ali Akbar Khan	Classical Music of India	
BVLP 1081	Lightnin' Hopkins	Got to Move Your Baby	Reissue of BVLP 1029
BVLP 1083	Big Joe Williams	Studio Blues	
BVLP 1084	Lightnin' Hopkins	His Greatest Hits	
BVLP 1086	Lightnin' Hopkins	Down Home Blues	
BVLP 1087	Shirley Griffith	Saturday Blues	
BVLP 1089	Oudi Hrant	Turkish Delights	
OBCCD-570-2	Lonnie Johnson with Elmer Snowden	Blues, Ballads, and Jumpin' Jazz	Released in 1990
7PCD-4406-2	Lightnin' Hopkins	The Complete Prestige/Bluesville Recordings	Seven CD box set released in 1991
00025218056328	Lightnin' Hopkins	The Swarthmore Concert	Released in 1993

== See also ==
- List of record labels
