= The Blues of Pink Anderson: Ballad & Folksinger =

Studio album by Pink Anderson
- Released: 1963
- Recorded: August 14, 1961
- Studio: Spartanburg, SC
- Genre: Blues
- Label: Bluesville; BVLP 1071
- Producer: Kenneth S. Goldstein

Pink Anderson chronology
Medicine Show Man (1962)	The Blues of Pink Anderson: Ballad & Folksinger (1963)	Carolina Medicine Show Hokum & Blues (1984)

The Blues of Pink Anderson: Ballad & Folksinger, subtitled Vol. 3, is an album by blues musician Pink Anderson recorded in 1961 and released on the Bluesville label in 1963.

== Reception ==
Professional ratings
Review scores
Source	Rating
AllMusic	4/5 stars
The Penguin Guide to Blues Recordings	2/4 stars

AllMusic reviewer Lindsay Planer stated: "Astute listeners will note that three of the titles – "The Titanic," "John Henry," and "The Wreck of the Old 97" – were duplicated from Anderson's side-long contribution to Gospel, Blues & Street Songs. , . However Anderson's delivery is notably different when comparing the two performances. One of the primary discrepancies lies in the pacing. Here, the readings are more definite and seemingly less rushed. The same is true for the phrasing of Anderson's vocals ... The intricate and somewhat advanced guitar-playing – that became one of Anderson's trademarks – is arguably more pronounced on these recordings as well".

== Track listing ==
All compositions are uncredited traditional blues

1. "The Titanic" – 4:04
2. "Boll Weevil" – 3:58
3. "John Henry" – 4:58
4. "Betty and Dupree" – 4:42
5. "Sugar Babe" – 2:40
6. "Wreck of the Old '97" – 4:38
7. "I Will Fly Away" – 3:44
8. "The Kaiser" – 2:02
9. "In the Evening" – 3:17

== Personnel ==
=== Performance ===
- Pink Anderson – guitar, vocals

=== Production ===
- Kenneth S. Goldstein – producer
- Samuel B. Charters – engineer
