= Jimmy Bond (musician) =

American bass player, arranger and composer (1933–2012)

- Born: James Edward Bond Jr. January 27, 1933; Philadelphia, Pennsylvania, United States
- Died: April 26, 2012 (aged 79) Los Angeles, California, U.S.
- Genres: Jazz, R&B, pop, folk, gospel
- Occupations: Musician, composer, arranger
- Instrument: Double bass
- Years active: Early 1950s – late 1980s

James Edward Bond Jr. (January 27, 1933 – April 26, 2012), known as Jimmy Bond, was an American double bass player, arranger and composer who performed and recorded with many leading jazz, blues, folk and rock musicians between the 1950s and 1980s.

== Biography ==
Bond was born in Philadelphia, and learned the double bass and tuba as well as studying orchestration and composition. He attended the Juilliard School between 1950 and 1955. He played bass in clubs in Philadelphia, with musicians such as Charlie Parker, Thelonious Monk and Gene Ammons. After his formal studies ended, he performed regularly with Chet Baker, Ella Fitzgerald, and Sonny Rollins, and in 1958 began touring with George Shearing.

He moved to Los Angeles in 1959. He became resident bass player at the Renaissance nightclub on Sunset Boulevard, where he played with Ben Webster. Art Pepper, Jim Hall and Jimmy Giuffre, and also recorded with Paul Horn. From 1962, he became a session musician in Los Angeles. From then until the early 1970s and on a more occasional basis until the 1980s, he participated in hundreds of recording sessions covering not only jazz but also rock, pop, folk, and gospel. He became one of the members of the Wrecking Crew, a group of session musicians often associated with work for Phil Spector. Other musicians with whom he recorded included Randy Newman, Frank Zappa, Tim Buckley, The Jazz Crusaders, Nina Simone, Lightnin' Hopkins, Jimmy Witherspoon, Linda Ronstadt, Henry Mancini, Lou Rawls, Tony Bennett, and B.B. King. Increasingly he also worked as an arranger, with producers Nik Venet, David Axelrod and others, as well as composing and arranging advertising jingles.

He died in 2012, aged 79, as a result of complications from cardiopulmonary disease.

== Discography ==
With Curtis Amy

- Groovin' Blue (Pacific Jazz, 1961) with Frank Butler

With Earl Anderza

- Outa Sight (Pacific Jazz, 1962)

With Chet Baker

- Indian Summer Jazz at the Concertgebouw 1955 (Dutch Jazz Archive, 2007)
- Chet Baker Sings (Pacific Jazz, 1956)
- Chet Baker Big Band (Pacific Jazz, 1956)
- Chet Baker And Crew (Pacific Jazz, 1956)

With Louis Bellson

- Big Band Jazz from the Summit (Roulette, 1962)

With Tim Buckley

- Goodbye and Hello (Elektra, 1967)

With Terry Gibbs

- That Swing Thing! (Verve, 1961)

With Joe Gordon

- Lookin' Good! (Contemporary, 1961)

With Lightnin' Hopkins

- Lightnin' Strikes (Verve Folkways, 1966)
- Something Blue (Verve Forecast, 1967)

With Paul Horn

- Something Blue (HiFi Jazz, 1960)
- The Sound of Paul Horn (Columbia, 1961)

With The Jazz Crusaders

- Freedom Sound (Pacific Jazz, 1961)
- Lookin' Ahead (Pacific Jazz, 1962)
- The Festival Album (Pacific Jazz, 1966)

With Irene Kral

- Wonderful Life (Mainstream, 1965)

With Julie London

- Feeling Good (Liberty, 1965)

With Brownie McGhee and Sonny Terry

- Down South Summit Meetin' (World Pacific, 1960) with Lightnin' Hopkins and Big Joe Williams
- A Long Way from Home (BluesWay, 1969)
- I Couldn't Believe My Eyes (Bluesway, 1969 [1973])

With Frank Morgan

- Frank Morgan (Gene Norman Presents, 1955)

With Gerry Mulligan

- If You Can't Beat 'Em, Join 'Em! (Limelight, 1965)
- Feelin' Good (Limelight, 1966)

With Nina Simone

- Little Girl Blue (Bethlehem, 1959)
- Nina Simone and Her Friends (Bethleham, 1959)

With Art Pepper

- Smack Up (Contemporary, 1960)
- Intensity (Contemporary, 1960)

With Jim Sullivan

- U.F.O. (Monnie, 1969)

With Gerald Wilson

- You Better Believe It! (Pacific Jazz, 1961)
- Moment of Truth (Pacific Jazz, 1962)

With Jimmy Woods

- Awakening!! (Contemporary, 1962)
