= Last Night Blues =

Studio album by Lightnin' Hopkins with Sonny Terry
- Released: 1961
- Recorded: October 26, 1960
- Studio: Van Gelder, Englewood Cliffs, NJ
- Genre: Blues
- Length: 36:24
- Label: Bluesville; BVLP 1029
- Producer: The Sound of America

Lightnin' Hopkins chronology
| Down South Summit Meetin' (1960) | Last Night Blues (1961) | Lightnin' (1961) |

Sonny Terry chronology
| Sonny's Story (1961) | Last Night Blues (1961) | Sonny Is King (1963) |

Last Night Blues is an album by the blues musician Lightnin' Hopkins, with Sonny Terry, recorded in 1960 and released on the Bluesville label the following year.

== Reception ==
Professional ratings
Review scores
| Source | Rating |
|---|---|
| AllMusic | 3/5 stars |
| The Penguin Guide to Blues Recordings | 3/4 stars |

AllMusic stated: "Lightnin' Hopkins may be Texas's most distinctive and influential blues export. His easy, fluid fingerpicking and witty, extemporaneous storytelling are always a delight, and his performances on Last Night Blues are no exception. The album is spare and acoustic, with Hopkins's voice and guitar accompanied by minimal percussion and Sonny Terry's harmonica ... this dynamite disc represents what the blues should be: stripped-down, soulful, and full of truth". The Penguin Guide to Blues Recordings awarded the album 3 stars, noting: "Sonny Terry's contributions to Last Night Blues is entirely and discreetly responsive".

== Track listing ==
All compositions by Sam "Lightnin'" Hopkins except where noted

1. "Rocky Mountain" – 4:57
2. "Got to Move Your Baby" – 4:01
3. "So Sorry to Leave You" – 4:21
4. "Take a Trip With Me" – 5:04
5. "Last Night Blues" – 5:16
6. "Lightnin's Stroke" – 4:55
7. "Hard to Love a Woman" – 4:00
8. "Conversation Blues" (Lightnin' Hopkins, Sonny Terry) – 3:50

== Personnel ==
- Lightnin' Hopkins – guitar, vocals
- Sonny Terry – harmonica, vocals
- Leonard Gaskin – bass
- Belton Evans – drums
- The Sound of America – producer
- Rudy Van Gelder – engineer

== Charts ==
Chart performance for Last Night Blues
| Chart (2024) | Peak position |
|---|---|
| Croatian International Albums (HDU) | 17 |
