= Lightnin' (album) =

Studio album by Lightnin' Hopkins
- Released: 1961
- Recorded: November 9, 1960
- Studio: Van Gelder Studio, Englewood Cliffs, New Jersey
- Genre: Blues
- Length: 40:34
- Label: Bluesville

Lightnin' Hopkins chronology
Last Night Blues (1960)	Lightnin' (1961)	Lightnin' in New York (1961)

Lightnin' (subtitled The Blues of Lightnin' Hopkins) is an album by the blues musician Lightnin' Hopkins, recorded in 1960 and released on the Bluesville label the following year.

== Reception ==
Professional ratings
Review scores
Source	Rating
AllMusic	3/5 stars
The Penguin Guide to Blues Recordings	3/4 stars

AllMusic reviewer Alex Henderson stated: "Lightnin' is among the rewarding acoustic dates Lightnin' Hopkins delivered in the early '60s. The session has an informal, relaxed quality, and this approach serves a 48-year-old Hopkins impressively well ... Lightnin' is a lot like being in a small club with Hopkins as he shares his experiences, insights and humor with you". The Penguin Guide to Blues Recordings awarded the album 3 stars, noting that "Lightnin's performances are unfailingly fluent, perhaps because he doesn't challenge himself: almost all the songs on Lightnin' are well-tried pieces from his core repertoire".

== Track listing ==
All compositions by Sam Hopkins except where noted

1. "Automobile Blues" – 4:34
2. "You Better Watch Yourself" – 5:00
3. "Mean Old Frisco" (Arthur Crudup) – 3:43
4. "Shinin' Moon" – 4:09
5. "Come Back Baby" (Walter Davis) – 3:31
6. "Thinkin' 'Bout an Old Friend" – 5:08
7. "The Walkin' Blues" – 3:25
8. "Back to New Orleans" (Brownie McGhee, Sonny Terry) – 3:22
9. "Katie Mae" – 4:05
10. "Down There Baby" – 4:07

== Personnel ==
=== Performance ===
- Lightnin' Hopkins – guitar, vocals
- Leonard Gaskin – bass
- Belton Evans – drums

=== Production ===
- Ozzie Cadena – supervision
- Rudy Van Gelder – engineer
