= Blues & Folk =

Studio album by Brownie McGhee and Sonny Terry
- Released: 1960
- Recorded: August 22, 1960
- Studio: Van Gelder Studio, Englewood Cliffs, NJ
- Genre: Blues
- Length: 36:54
- Label: Bluesville; BVLP 1005
- Producer: The Sound of America Inc.

Brownie McGhee and Sonny Terry chronology
| Down Home Blues (1960) | Blues & Folk (1960) | Blues All Around My Head (1960) |

Blues & Folk is an album by blues musicians Brownie McGhee and Sonny Terry. This record was recorded in 1960 and released on the Bluesville label.

Professional ratings
Review scores
| Source | Rating |
|---|---|
| AllMusic | 3/5 stars |

== Track listing ==
All compositions by Brownie McGhee and Sonny Terry except where noted

1. "Sonny's Squall" – 3:46
2. "Red River Blues" – 3:22
3. "Gone Gal" (Brownie McGhee) – 3:31
4. "Blues Before Sunrise" (Leroy Carr) – 4:32
5. "Sweet Lovin' Kind" – 3:13
6. "Midnight Special" (Traditional) – 4:07
7. "Take This Hammer Whup" (Traditional) – 2:54
8. "Too Nicey Mama" – 4:19
9. "Meet Me Down at the Bottom" (Traditional) – 3:44
10. "Tryin' to Win" – 3:26

== Personnel ==
=== Performance ===
- Sonny Terry – harmonica, vocals
- Brownie McGhee – guitar, vocals

=== Production ===
- Rudy Van Gelder – engineer
