= J. Adams =

J. Adams may refer to:

== People ==
- J. Allen Adams (1932–2017), American politician and lawyer
- J. B. Adams (born 1954), American character stage and film actor, director, and singer
- J. C. Adams (born 1970), American author, editor, reporter, and pornographic film director
- J. Christian Adams (born 1968), American attorney and conservative activist
- J. M. Adams (born 1834), American politician
- J. Stuart Adams, American politician
- J. T. Adams (1926–1993), American gospel singer, musician, and record label founder

== Other uses ==
- J. Adams (aircraft constructor); see List of aircraft

== See also ==
- John Adams (disambiguation)
