= Blues All Around My Head =

Studio album by Brownie McGhee and Sonny Terry
- Released: 1961
- Recorded: August 22, 1960
- Studio: Van Gelder Studio, Englewood Cliffs, NJ
- Genre: Blues
- Length: 37:12
- Label: Bluesville; BVLP 1020
- Producer: The Sound of America Inc.

Brownie McGhee and Sonny Terry chronology
Blues & Folk (1960)	Blues All Around My Head (1961)	Blues in My Soul (1960)

Blues All Around My Head is an album by blues musicians Brownie McGhee and Sonny Terry recorded in 1960 and released on the Bluesville label the following year.

Professional ratings
Review scores
Source	Rating
AllMusic	3/5 stars

== Track listing ==
All compositions by Brownie McGhee except where noted.

1. "Blues All Around My Head" (Sonny Terry) – 4:27
2. "East Coast Blues" – 3:31
3. "Muddy Water" (Traditional) – 4:14
4. "Beggin' and Cryin'" – 3:04
5. "My Plan" – 3:56
6. "Trying to Deceive Me" – 3:49
7. "Everything I Had Is Gone" – 4:15
8. "Jealous Man" – 3:26
9. "Understand Me" – 3:54
10. "Blues of Happiness" – 2:36

== Personnel ==
=== Performance ===
- Sonny Terry – harmonica, vocals
- Brownie McGhee – guitar, vocals

=== Production ===
- Rudy Van Gelder – engineer
