= Blues in My Bottle =

Studio album by Lightnin' Hopkins
- Released: 1961
- Recorded: July 26, 1961
- Studio: ACA Studios (Gold Star Studios), Houston, TX
- Genre: Blues
- Length: 39:27
- Label: Bluesville
- Producer: Kenneth S. Goldstein, Mack McCormick

Lightnin' Hopkins chronology
Mojo Hand (1960)	Blues in My Bottle (1961)	Blues Hoot (1962)

Blues in My Bottle is an album by Lightnin' Hopkins, released in 1961 on Bluesville Records.

== Reception ==
Professional ratings
Review scores
Source	Rating
AllMusic	3/5 stars
The Penguin Guide to Blues Recordings	3/4 stars
The Rolling Stone Album Guide	4/5 stars

The AllMusic review noted: "He was at his best when unaccompanied, as on this Prestige date recorded in 1961. Though he usually played electric guitar, the Texas blues titan performed on this release with an acoustic, and the result is most rewardin". The Penguin Guide to Blues Recordings wrote that "Lightnin' chanting the R&B hit 'Wine Spode-o-dee' on Blues in My Bottle is no more than a couple of minutes of fun, but it neatly demonstrates his range of reference, coming straight after 'Buddy Browns Blues', a reminiscence of Texas Alexander".

== Track listing ==
1. "Buddy Brown's Blues" (Alger "Texas" Alexander)
2. "Wine Spodee-O-Dee" (Stick McGhee, J. Mayo Williams)
3. "Sail On, Little Girl, Sail On" (Traditional)
4. "DC-7" (Hopkins)
5. "Death Bells" (Hopkins)
6. "Goin' to Dallas to See My Pony Run" (Traditional)
7. "Jailhouse Blues" (Traditional)
8. "Blues in My Bottle" (Traditional)
9. "Beans, Beans, Beans" (Traditional, Hopkins)
10. "Catfish Blues" (Traditional)
11. "My Grandpa Is Old Too!" (Hopkins)
