= A Long Way from Home (album) =

Studio album by Brownie McGhee and Sonny Terry
- Released: 1969
- Recorded: March 1, 1969
- Studio: Vault, Los Angeles, CA
- Genre: Blues
- Length: 42:04
- Label: BluesWay; BL/BLS 6028
- Producer: Ed Michel

Sonny Terry and Brownie McGhee chronology
| Blues Hoot (1963) | A Long Way from Home (1969) | I Couldn't Believe My Eyes (1970) |

A Long Way from Home is an album by blues musicians Brownie McGhee and Sonny Terry, released by the BluesWay label in 1969.

== Reception ==
Professional ratings
Review scores
| Source | Rating |
|---|---|
| AllMusic | 4/5 stars |
| The Penguin Guide to Blues Recordings | 2.5/4 stars |

AllMusic reviewer Cub Koda stated: "Solid, relaxed, rockin' grooves are the hallmarks here with both artists in fine form".

== Track listing ==
All compositions credited to Brownie McGhee except where noted

1. "A Long Way from Home" (Sonny Terry) – 1:59
2. "Big Question" (Brownie McGhee) – 3:41
3. "Rock Island Line" (Traditional) – 2:25
4. "Night and Day" (McGhee, Terry) – 4:54
5. "You Just Usin' Me for a Convenience" – 3:45
6. "Hole in the Wall" – 3:49
7. "Life Is a Gamble" – 4:31
8. "Don't Mistreat Me" (McGhee, Terry) – 3:28
9. "Packin' Up, Gettin' Ready" – 5:55
10. "Wailin' & Whoopin'" (Terry) – 2:57
11. "B. M. Special" (McGhee, Terry, Ray Johnson, Jimmy Bond, Panama Francis) – 7:40

== Personnel ==
- Brownie McGhee – guitar, vocals
- Sonny Terry – harmonica, vocals
- Ray Johnson – piano
- Jimmy Bond – bass
- Panama Francis – drums
