= Al Adams =

Al Adams may refer to:

- Albert J. Adams (1845–1906), American racketeer
- J. Allen Adams (1932–2017), American politician and lawyer
