= Mercy Dee Walton =

American songwriter

- Walton in 1953

Background information
- Born: Mercy Davis Walton; August 3, 1915; Waco, Texas, United States
- Died: December 2, 1962 (aged 47) Murphys, California, U.S.
- Genres: Jump blues
- Years active: 1949–1962

Mercy Dee Walton (born Mercy Davis Walton, August 3, 1915 – December 2, 1962) was an American jump blues pianist, singer and songwriter, whose compositions went from blues to R&B numbers. According to journalist Tony Russell in his book The Blues - From Robert Johnson to Robert Cray, "Walton created a series of memorable blues about the unattractiveness of rural life, sardonically aimed at the black migrant workers in southern California who constituted his typical audience".

== Biography ==
Born in Waco, Texas, he moved to California just before World War II. He started playing piano at age 13 and learned his style from many of the ten-cent party house pianists that played out in the country on weekends. To make ends meet, he had to earn his living in the fields chopping cotton, picking grapes or cutting spinach. During this time, the musician who impressed Walton the most was Delois Maxey, who never had an opportunity to record. In 1949, Walton made his first record for the small record label, Spire Records in Fresno. The track was "Lonesome Cabin Blues". Shortly after that, he had a national hit on Specialty Records with "One Room Country Shack", now considered a blues standard. After that success, he was able to start working as a musician full-time, and he toured with the jump blues band of Big Jay McNeely.

A half dozen tracks recorded for the Flair Records label in 1955, included "Come Back Maybellene," a sequel to Chuck Berry's then-current hit, "Maybellene".

In 1961, Arhoolie Records released an album recorded in Stockton, California, entitled Mercy Dee. Featured with him was Sidney Maiden on harmonica, K. C. Douglas on electric guitar and Otis Cherry playing the drums. Also released in 1961 was the album Pity And A Shame on the Prestige Bluesville label.

Walton died of a cerebral hemorrhage in Murphys, California, the following year.

== Single discography ==
- "Lonesome Cabin Blues" (a.k.a. "Log Cabin Blues") / "Baba-Du-Lay Fever" (a.k.a. "G.I. Fever") (Spire) 1949
- "Evil And Hanky" / "Travelin'" Alone Blues" (Spire) 1949
- "Homely Baby" / "Empty Life" (Imperial) 1950
- "Big Foot Country" / "Bird Brain Baby" (Imperial) 1950
- "Roamin' Blues" / "Bought Love" (Imperial) 1950
- "Danger Zone" / "Pay Off" (a.k.a. "Anything In The World") (Imperial) 1950
- "Happy Bachelor" / "Straight And Narrow" (Colony) (1950)
- "Old Fashioned Ways" / "Pay Off" (a.k.a. "Anything In The World") (Colony) 1950
- "Please Understand" / "Pay Off" (a.k.a. "Anything In The World") (Bayou) 1950
- "One Room Country Shack" / "My Woman Knows The Score" (Specialty) 1953
- "Rent Man Blues" / "Fall Guy" (Specialty) 1953
- "Dark Muddy Bottom" / "Get To Gettin'" (Specialty) 1953
- "Trailing My Baby" / "The Main Event" (Rhythm) 1954
- "Romp And Stomp Blues" / "Oh Oh Please" (Flair) 1955
- "Come Back Maybellene" / "True Love" (Flair) 1955
- "Have You Ever" / "Stubborn Woman" (Flair) 1955
- "Lady Luck" / "Betty Jean" (Arhoolie) 1961
