= Sidney Maiden =

American musician

- Born: April 1917; DeSoto Parish, Louisiana, United States
- Died: c. 1987 (age about 70) Arizona, United States
- Genres: Country blues
- Occupations: Harmonica player, singer and songwriter
- Instruments: Harmonica, vocals
- Years active: 1940s–1970
- Formerly of: K. C. Douglas Trio

Sidney Maiden (April 1917 – c. 1987) was an American country blues musician. Maiden principally played harmonica accompaniment, but also sang on some of his own recordings, in addition to writing several compositions. His best known work is "Eclipse of the Sun" (1948).

== Life and career ==
Maiden was born in Evelyn, DeSoto Parish, Louisiana, in 1917, although some sources state 1923. By the early 1940s, he had relocated to California and met K. C. Douglas. They both steadfastly stuck to playing in a country blues style and performed in nightclubs on the West Coast. The K. C. Douglas Trio's first recording was "Mercury Boogie" (later renamed "Mercury Blues"), in 1948, which included Maiden playing the harmonica. The B-side was "Eclipse of the Sun", which was also produced by the record label owner Bob Geddins and released on his Down Town label. It was Maiden's vocal on the latter track.

By 1952, Maiden recorded a session for Imperial Records, in which he was backed by the Blues Blowers, which included Douglas. Three years later, another Maiden track, "Hurry Hurry Baby", was released by Flash Records. This was followed by "Hand Me Down Baby", recorded by Maiden with Al Simmons and Slim Green in Los Angeles in 1957.

In April 1961, Maiden recorded his only album, Trouble an' Blues, which was originally released by the Prestige Bluesville label, thus reuniting a partnership with Douglas that had started in the 1940s. The same year, Arhoolie Records released the album Mercy Dee, by Mercy Dee Walton, recorded in Stockton, California. It featured Walton plus Maiden on harmonica, Douglas on electric guitar and Otis Cherry on the drums.

Afterwards Maiden performed occasionally in Fresno County, both as a solo performer and in various group settings. His later life is largely unrecorded. According to the researchers Bob Eagle and Eric LeBlanc, he died in Arizona in the late 1980s; some other sources date his death to 1970.

== Discography (reissue) ==
Year	Title	Label	Notes
1995	Trouble an' Blues	Original Blues Classics	Recorded April 16, 1961
