= Brownie's Blues =

Studio album by Brownie McGhee
- Released: 1962
- Recorded: October 6, 1960
- Studio: Van Gelder Studio, Englewood Cliffs, NJ
- Genre: Blues
- Length: 38:47
- Label: Bluesville; BVLP 1042
- Producer: The Sound of America

Brownie McGhee chronology
Blues in My Soul (1961)	Brownie's Blues (1962)	Sonny Terry and Brownie McGhee at Sugar Hill (1961)

Brownie's Blues is an album by blues musician Brownie McGhee recorded in 1960 and released on the Bluesville label in 1962.

== Reception ==
Professional ratings
Review scores
Source	Rating
AllMusic	4/5 stars
The Penguin Guide to Blues Recordings	4/4 stars

AllMusic reviewer Thom Owens stated: "Supported by his longtime accompanist Sonny Terry, as well as second guitarist Benny Foster, Brownie turns in a nicely understated record that's distinguished by surprisingly harmonically complex and jazzy guitar work".

== Track listing ==
All compositions by Brownie McGhee except where noted

1. "Jump, Little Children" – 4:36
2. "Lonesome Day" – 5:25
3. "One Thing for Sure" – 3:20
4. "The Killin' Floor" – 3:41
5. "Little Black Engine" – 3:44
6. "I Don't Know the Reason" – 4:03
7. "Trouble in Mind" (Richard M. Jones) – 4:55
8. "Everyday I Have the Blues" (Peter Chatman) – 5:15
9. "Door to Success" – 4:10

== Personnel ==
=== Performance ===
- Brownie McGhee – guitar, vocals
- Sonny Terry – harmonica
- Bennie Foster – guitar

It has been suggested that “Bennie Foster” was a pseudonym for Stick McGhee.

=== Production ===
- Ozzie Cadena – supervision
- Rudy Van Gelder – engineer
