= Sticks Evans =

American drummer

- Born: February 5, 1923
- Died: April 11, 1994 (aged 71) New York City, U.S.
- Genres: Jazz, blues
- Occupation: Musician
- Instrument: Drums
- Years active: 1948–1994
- Label: Prestige

Samuel "Sticks" Evans (February 5, 1923 – April 11, 1994) was an American drummer, percussionist, music teacher, arranger and musical director. He was credited variously as Sammy "Stick" Evans, Samie Evans, Sammy Evans, Sammie Evans, Stick Evans, Sticks Evans, and Belton Evans.

== Biography ==
In 1950, he recorded with the Milt Buckner Orchestra backing Wynonie Harris, and in 1952-53 he was playing and recording with Milt Buckner's Organ Trio. He left the trio in February 1953, and in 1954 he was with the Teddy Wilson Trio with Milt Hinton.

In the early 1960s, he was recording on the Prestige label, credited as Belton Evans, and accompanied on bass by Leonard Gaskin, for blues artists such as Curtis Jones, Sunnyland Slim, Sonny Terry, Big John Greer, LaVern Baker, and King Curtis.

He appears on John Lewis’ Jazz Abstractions album (1961), with Bill Evans, Eric Dolphy, Ornette Coleman and Jim Hall, among others. That same year he was a member of the Ray Bryant Combo backing Aretha Franklin on her second album, Aretha.

His pupils included Bernard Purdie, Max Neuhaus, and Terry Burrus. Evans died of a stroke, in New York City, in 1994.

== Discography ==
- 1959: The Wildest Guitar – Mickey Baker
- 1959: Rock with Sedaka – Neil Sedaka
- 1960: Slim's Shout – Sunnyland Slim
- 1960: Buck Jumpin', The Al Casey Quartet – Al Casey
- 1960: Sonny's Story – Sonny Terry
- 1960: Slim's Shout – Sunnyland Slim
- 1960: The Honeydripper – Roosevelt Sykes
- 1960: Sonny Is King – Sonny Terry
- 1960: Lightnin' – Lightnin' Hopkins
- 1960: Trouble Blues – Curtis Jones
- 1960: Pre Bird (later re-released as Mingus Revisited) – Charles Mingus
- 1961: Beauty is a Rare Thing – Ornette Coleman
- 1961: Aretha: With The Ray Bryant Combo – Aretha Franklin
- 1964: Sam Cooke at the Copa – Sam Cooke
- 1964: Ya! Ya! – Budd Johnson
- 1971: Gospel Now – Marion Williams
