= Whoopin' (album) =

Studio album by Sonny Terry
- Released: 1984
- Genre: Blues
- Label: Alligator
- Producer: Johnny Winter

Sonny Terry chronology
Midnight Special (1978)	Whoopin' (1984)	Old Town Blues, Vol. 1 (1986)

Whoopin' is an album by the American musician Sonny Terry, released in 1984. He is credited with Johnny Winter and Willie Dixon. The album was also released as I Think I Got the Blues. It was the first of Winter's two 1984 Alligator Records albums.

== Production ==
Recorded in three days, Whoopin' was produced by Winter. He wanted to capture a rawer, Delta sound, rather than the mellower, prettier one that Terry played with Brownie McGhee. "I Think I Got the Blues" was written by Dixon, who also played bass on the album. Styve Homnick played drums. "Ya, Ya" is a cover of the Lee Dorsey song.

== Critical reception ==
Professional ratings
Review scores
Source	Rating
AllMusic	3/5 stars
Calgary Herald	A
The Commercial Appeal	4/4 stars
Lincoln Journal Star	3.5/5 stars
MusicHound Blues: The Essential Album Guide	2.5/5 stars
Omaha World-Herald	4/5 stars
The Penguin Guide to Blues Recordings	3/4 stars
The Virgin Encyclopedia of the Blues	3/5 stars

The Globe and Mail noted that, "although the familiar, jolly material ... jumps along at Terry's usual, casual pace, Winters seems intent on pushing it into overdrive." The Boston Globe wrote that Terry's "playing had its familiar sweeping tone and was still electrifying." The Sydney Morning Herald called the album "excellent," writing that "Johnny and Sonny whoop, holler and jam to their hearts' content." The Pittsburgh Press opined that Winter "shows admirable restraint in these more subtle, traditional blues."

The Press of Atlantic City praised the "outstanding musicianship" and "sweet harp." The Commercial Appeal determined that Whoopin' "is destined for 'classic' status," writing that "every cut is raw, lean, and mean." The Omaha World-Herald stated that Terry plays "a mean harmonica on 10 rocking blues numbers." The Lincoln Journal Star determined that "Terry achieves something that's electrified, but not modernly electronic." The Idaho Statesman listed Whoopin' as the eighth best album of 1984.

AllMusic lamented that "Terry didn't put any amplified muscle behind his harmonica."

== Track listing ==
No.	Title	Length
1.	"I Got My Eyes on You"
2.	"Sonny's Whoopin' the Doop"
3.	"Burnt Child"
4.	"Whoee, Whoee"
5.	"Crow Jane"
6.	"So Tough with Me"
7.	"Whoo Wee Baby"
8.	"I Think I Got the Blues"
9.	"Ya, Ya"
10.	"Roll Me Baby"
