= Mighty Mo =

Mighty Mo may refer to:

- The Missouri River
- USS Missouri (BB-63)
- Mighty Mo (food), sandwich originating in Washington, D.C.
- Mighty Mo (kickboxer) (born 1970)
- Maurice Hooker, (born 1989), American boxer
- Mighty Mo Rodgers, (born 1942), American musician
- Mo Huilan, (born 1979), Chinese gymnast
