= Down Home Blues =

Down Home Blues may refer to:

- "Down Home Blues", song sung by Ethel Waters on Black Swan Records in 1921
- "Down Home Blues". a song by George Jackson
- Down Home Blues (Brownie McGhee and Sonny Terry album), 1960
- Down Home Blues (Lightnin' Hopkins album), 1965
