= Mighty Mo Rodgers =

American singer

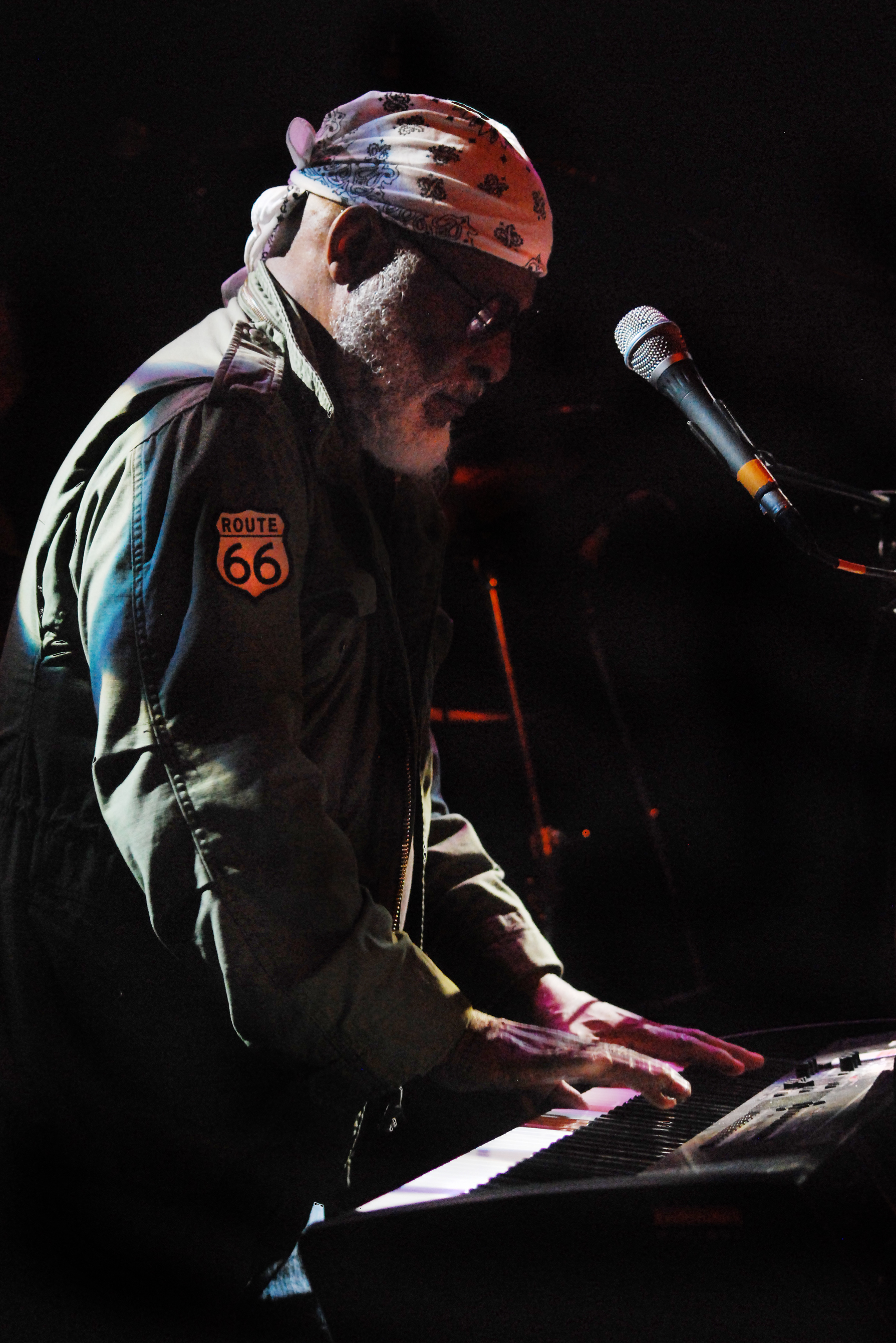
- Mighty Mo Rodgers

Background information
- Born: Maurice Rodgers; July 24, 1942 (age 83); East Chicago, Indiana, United States
- Genres: Electric blues
- Occupations: Musician, singer, songwriter, record producer
- Instruments: Vocals, keyboards
- Years active: Mid 1960s–present
- Label: Various including Blue Thumb
- Website: Official website

Mighty Mo Rodgers (born July 24, 1942) is an American electric blues musician, singer, songwriter, and record producer, who has released eight albums to date. He has been influenced by the work of Aretha Franklin, Bobby Bland, Eddie Boyd, Jimmy Reed, Otis Redding, Sam & Dave, and Willie Dixon.

Bonnie Raitt noted that "Mo Rodgers' music is a breath of fresh air in the blues/R&B world. He combines sly social commentary with a great funky sound. . . . I love his voice. He's a welcome original."

== Biography ==
Maurice Rodgers was born in East Chicago, Indiana, He studied classical piano, but was more influenced by witnessing the blues acts that performed at his father's nightclub. In the mid-1960s, the music produced by the American record label Stax also affected his musical ambitions. In high school, Rodgers formed his first band, the Rocketeers. After entering Indiana State College, he fronted the Maurice Rodgers Combo. His love of playing keyboards led Rodgers to leave college and relocate to Los Angeles, California, becoming a full-time musician.

He played the Farfisa electronic organ on Brenton Wood's 1967 hit "Gimme Little Sign".

In 1973, Rodgers co-produced the album Sonny & Brownie (A&M Records), by Sonny Terry and Brownie McGhee. He also played keyboards on the album's cut. Following a spell as a session musician, Rodgers moved into songwriting for Motown and Chappell & Co. He also worked as a record producer before returning to education and obtaining a philosophy degree from California State University, Northridge. His first solo album, Blues Is My Wailin' Wall, was released in 1999 by Blue Thumb Records. The lyrics of several of the songs on the album present Rodgers's philosophical views of mankind.

In 2000, Rodgers performed at the Notodden Blues Festival. His European excursions have included concerts at the New Morning nightclub in Paris. In 2001, he performed on the album Memphis, recorded by Jean-Jacques Milteau, which also included contributions from Little Milton and Mighty Sam McClain. His own recordings continued with Red, White & Blues (2002); Black Paris Blues, a live album issued in 2004; and Redneck Blues (2007). His next release was Cadillac Jack in 2012.

Rodgers appeared at the 22nd Salmon Arm Roots and Blues Festival in August 2014.

In 2019, he toured with Baba Sissoko and performed at several European blues festivals. In 2017, they had jointly released the album, Griot Blues.

== Awards ==
- W. C. Handy Award nomination (1999) for Blues Is My Wailin' Wall
- Chic de l'Annee (1999) (France) as Blues Album of the Year for Blues Is My Wailin' Wall
- Living Blues magazine, Contemporary Blues Album of the Year (2002) for Red, White & Blues
- Académie Charles Cros (Grand Prix du Disque) (2002) for Red, White & Blues
- Trophees France Blues (2001) and (2002) International Artist
- Trophees France Blues (2003) International Songwriter
- Chic De L'Annee (2007) Blues Album of the Year for Redneck Blues

== Discography ==
=== Studio albums ===
Year	Title	Record label
1999	Blues Is My Wailin' Wall	Blue Thumb
2002	Red, White & Blues	Blue Thumb
2004	Black Paris Blues	Isabel
2007	Redneck Blues	DixieFrog
2009	Dispatches from the Moon	DixieFrog
2012	Cadillac Jack	Waterfront
2017	Griot Blues	One Root Music
2023	Memphis Callin': Soul Music & the American Dream	Drinking Gourd

== See also ==
- List of electric blues musicians
- Studio City Sound
