= Leonard Gaskin =

American jazz bassist

- Birth name: Leonard Gaskin
- Born: August 25, 1920
- Origin: New York City, United States
- Died: January 24, 2009 (aged 88)
- Genres: Jazz
- Instrument: Bass

Leonard Gaskin (August 25, 1920 – January 24, 2009) was an American jazz bassist born in New York City.

Gaskin played on the early bebop scene at Minton's and Monroe's in New York in the early 1940s. In 1944 he took over Oscar Pettiford's spot in Dizzy Gillespie's band, and followed it with stints in bands led by Cootie Williams, Charlie Parker, Don Byas, Eddie South, Charlie Shavers, and Erroll Garner. In the 1950s, he played with Eddie Condon's Dixieland band, and played with Ruby Braff, Bud Freeman, Rex Stewart, Cootie Williams, Billie Holiday, Stan Getz, J.J. Johnson, and Miles Davis.

In the 1960s he became a studio musician, playing on numerous gospel and pop records. In the 1970s and 1980s he returned to jazz, playing with Sy Oliver, Panama Francis, and The International Art of Jazz.

Gaskin became involved in educating young people later in his life. He performed and shared his knowledge with elementary students with the Good Groove Band (Leonard Gaskin, Melissa Lovaglio, Bob Emry, Michael Howell) at Woodstock Elementary School in Woodstock, New York in 2003.

Gaskin died of natural causes on January 24, 2009.

== Discography ==
=== As leader ===
- 1961 – Leonard Gaskin at the Jazz Band Ball, (Swingville)
- 1962 – Darktown Strutter's Ball, (Swingville)

=== As sideman ===
- 1945 – Miles Davis: First Miles (Savoy)
- 1946 – Don Byas: 1946 (Classics)
- 1949 – J. J. Johnson / Kai Winding / Bennie Green: Trombone by Three (OJC)
- 1949 – J. J. Johnson: J. J. Johnson's Jazz Quintets (Savoy)
- 1950 – Charlie Parker: Charlie Parker All Stars – Charlie Parker at Birdland and Cafe Society (Cool & Blue, 1950–1952)
- 1951 – Illinois Jacquet: Jazz Moods (Verve)
- 1953 – Miles Davis: Miles Davis with Horns (Prestige/OJC)
- 1955 – Billie Holiday: Lady Sings the Blues (Verve)
- 1955 – Sonny Terry / Brownie McGhee: Back Country Blues
- 1956 – Jimmy Scott: If Only You Knew (Savoy)
- 1956 – Big Maybelle: Candy (Savoy)
- 1956 – Sammy Price: Rock (Savoy)
- 1957 – Bud Freeman: Chicago / Austin High School Jazz in HiFi (RCA)
- 1957 – Eddie Condon: The Roaring Twenties (Columbia)
- 1958 – Ruby Braff: Easy Now (RCA)
- 1958 – Rex Stewart: Rendezvous with Rex (Felsted)
- 1959 – Rex Stewart & Dicky Wells: Chatter Jazz (RCA Victor)
- 1959 – Marion Williams: O Holy Night (Savoy)
- 1961 – Lightnin' Hopkins: Last Night Blues (Bluesville)
- 1961 – Arbee Stidham: Tired of Wandering (Bluesville)
- 1961 – Al Smith: Midnight Special (Bluesville)
- 1961 – Roosevelt Sykes: The Honeydripper (Bluesville)
- 1961 – Sunnyland Slim: Slim's Shout (Bluesville)
- 1961 – Lightnin' Hopkins: Lightnin' (Bluesville)
- 1961 – Curtis Jones: Trouble Blues (Bluesville)
- 1961 – Shakey Jake: Mouth Harp Blues (Bluesville)
- 1961 – Mildred Anderson: No More in Life (Bluesville)
- 1962 – The Staple Singers: Hammer and Nails (Riverside)
- 1962 – Rhoda Scott: Hey! Hey! Hey! (Tru-Sound)
- 1962 – Odetta: Sometimes I Feel Like Cryin' (RCA Victor)
- 1963 – Willis Jackson: Grease 'n' Gravy, The Good Life (Prestige)
- 1963 – Sonny Terry: Sonny Is King (Bluesville)
- 1963 – Lightnin' Hopkins: Goin' Away (Bluesville)
- 1963 – Red Holloway: The Burner (Prestige)
- 1963 – Jimmy Witherspoon: Blues Around the Clock (Prestige)
- 1963 – Bob Dylan: The Freewheelin' Bob Dylan (Columbia)
- 1964 – Lightnin' Hopkins: Down Home Blues (Bluesville)
- 1964 – Sonny Stitt: Primitivo Soul (Prestige)
- 1965 – Illinois Jacquet: Spectrum (Argo)
- 1965 – Lightnin' Hopkins: Soul Blues (Prestige)
- 1968 – Solomon Burke: King Solomon (Atlantic)
- 1972 – Louisiana Red: Louisiana Red Sings the Blues (Atlantic)
- 1997 – Stan Getz: The Complete Roost Recordings (Roost, 1950–1954)
- 2001 – Richard Negri: Meditations on a Downbeat, Words Spoken through Jazz (LightMoose)
