= Union Boys =

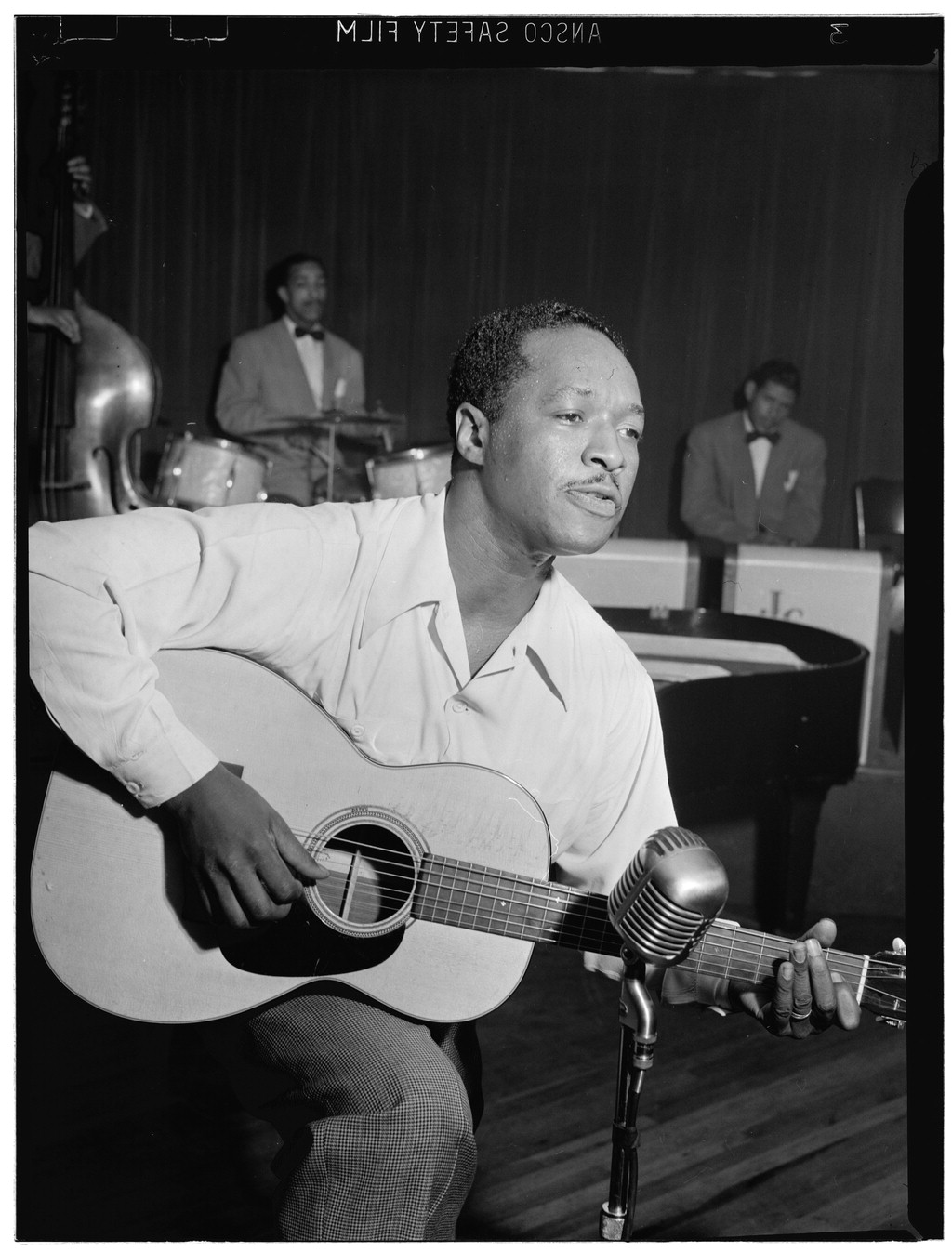
- Josh White (here at Café Society circa June 1946) sang lead on most Union Boys songs

Background information
- Origin: New York City
- Genres: Folk
- Years active: 11 March 1944

The Union Boys (also "Josh White and the Union Boys") was an American folk music group, formed impromptu in 1944, to record several songs on an album called Songs for Victory: Music for Political Action. Its "all-star leftist" members were Josh White, Sonny Terry, Brownie McGhee, Pete Seeger, Burl Ives, Tom Glazer (and Woody Guthrie by contributing a song).

== History ==
=== Background ===
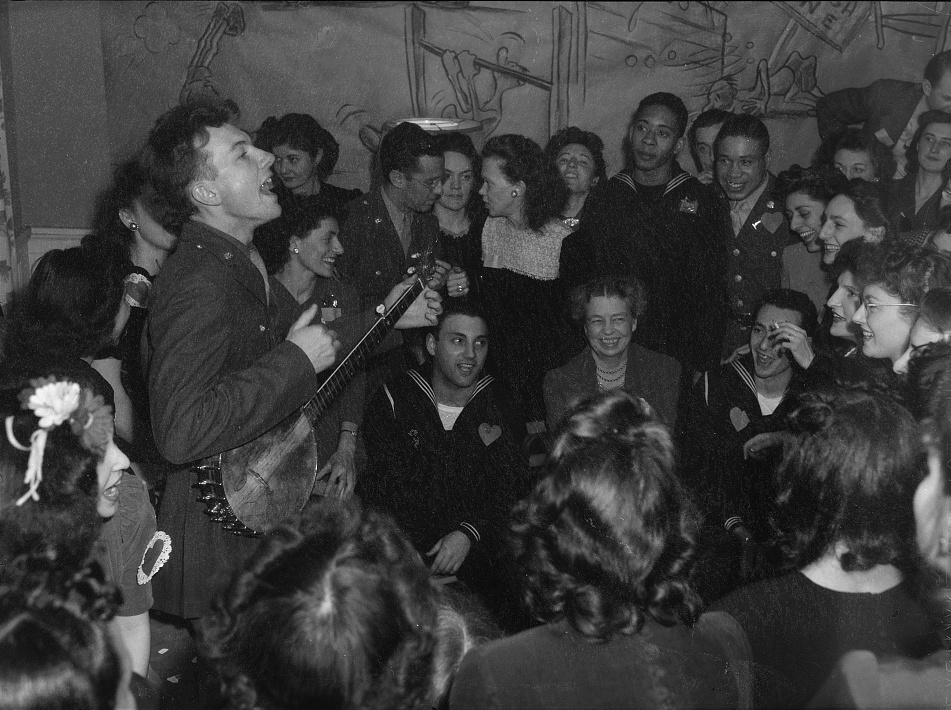
Pete Seeger entertaining Eleanor Roosevelt (center), honored guest at a racially integrated Valentine's Day party marking the opening of a Canteen of the United Federal Labor, CIO, in then-segregated Washington, D.C., 1944.

Songs of Victory fits with the Almanac Singers' album Dear Mr. President.

In 1942, Army intelligence and the FBI determined that the Almanacs and their former anti-draft message were still a seditious threat to recruitment and the morale of the war effort among blacks and youth. and they were hounded by hostile reviews, exposure of their Communist ties and negative coverage in the New York press, like the headline "Commie Singers try to Infiltrate Radio." They disbanded in late 1942 or early 1943.

=== Recording session ===
On March 11, 1944, Alan Lomax assembled the group for an impromptu recording at the Asch Recording Studio in New York City.

The album represents a change from the anti-war, anti-racism, and pro-union philosophies of most of its members but a continuation of their anti-Nazi, anti-Fascist philosophies in the form for support for the US and the Allies (which included the USSR).

The Union Boys turned out to be a one-time, one session "group": Moe Asch gave them the name.

=== Afterwards ===
A few months later, White and Glazer recorded another album with a similar title, Songs of Citizen CIO. Songs for Victory also began White's association with recording engineer Moe Asch, who released White's next two albums on his Asch Records label.

== Track listing ==
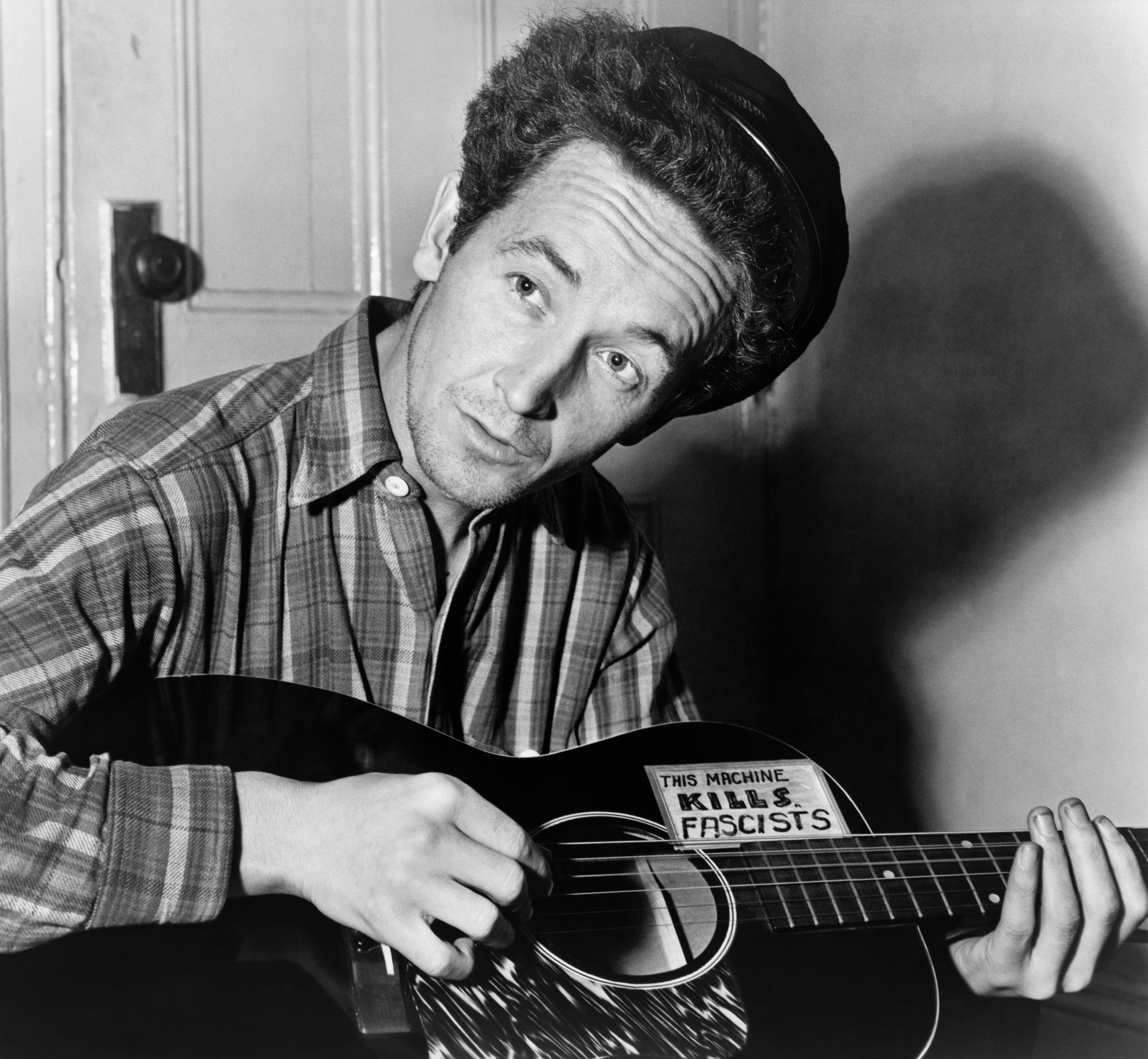
Woody Guthrie (here, with guitar labeled "This machine kills fascists," 1943) contributed a song

Woody Guthrie was not in New York City at the time and did not partake; the Union Boys sang one of his songs.

The Recorded Sound Archives of Florida Atlantic University lists:

1. "Hold the Fort / We Shall Not Be Moved"
2. "Hold On" (traditional, Union Boys led by Josh White)
3. "UAW-CIO" (written by Butch Haws)
4. "A Dollar Ain't a Dollar Any More" (written by Tom Glazer)
5. "Sally Don't You Grieve" (written by Woody Guthrie)
6. "Jim Crow" (written by Josh White, sung by Josh White)

The book Josh White: Society Blues by Elijah Wald lists:

- "Hold On" (traditional, led by Josh White)
- "Little Man on a Fence" (written and sung by Josh White)
- "Move into Germany" (sung by Josh White and Brownie McGhee)
- "Jim Crow" (written by Pete Seeger and Lee Hayes, Union Boys led by Josh White)

The album may have been reproduced at least once as Song for Political Action by the Union Boys.

=== "Hold On (Keep Your Hand On That Gun)" ===
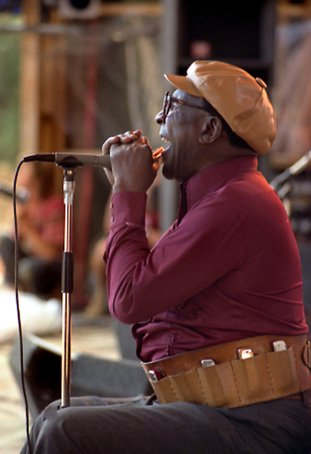
Sonny Terry (1981) (Michale Bennets, photographer)

"Hold On," itself a rewrite of a Gospel song "Gospel Plow," received a pro-war rewrite for this album, including the refrain:

Hold on – Franklin D. / Hold on – Winston C. / Hold on – Chiang Kai-shek / Hold on – Joseph Stalin / Keep your hands on that gun / And hold on.

The song appeared on White's posthumous album Free and Equal Blues (1998).

A celebration of the Allies' united front, the song is an entertaining reminder of what strange bedfellows politics can make, as the singers belt out the names of their heroic leaders: Franklin Roosevelt, Winston Churchill, Chiang Kai-shek, and Joseph Stalin.

Later, Josh White recorded the old folk tune as a new song, "Keep Your Hand on that Vote" that called "united Negroes" to voting booths. The folk song saw renewed resurgence in the 1950s and 1960s as "Keep Your Eyes on the Prize."

== Personnel ==
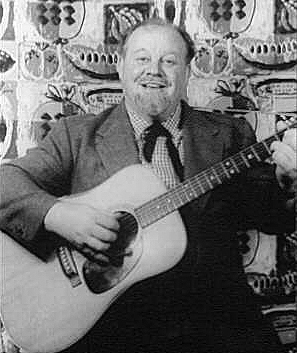
Burl Ives (1955)

Big Red Songbook shows the following lineup:

- Alan Lomax - producer (vocals on "Hold On")
- Tom Glazer - guitar
- Burl Ives - guitar
- Brownie McGhee - <->
- Pete Seeger - banjo
- Sonny Terry - harmonica
- Josh White - guitar

== See also ==
- "Gospel Plow"
- "Keep Your Eyes on the Prize"
- Almanac Singers
- The Weavers
