= Blues Is My Wailin' Wall =

Studio album by Mighty Mo Rodgers
- Released: 1999
- Genre: Blues
- Label: Blue Thumb
- Producer: Mighty Mo Rodgers

Mighty Mo Rodgers chronology
Blues Is My Wailin' Wall (1999)	Red, White & Blues (2002)

Blues Is My Wailin' Wall is the debut album by the American musician Mighty Mo Rodgers, released in 1999. Rodgers referred to his music as "nu bluez"; he was also working on a master's thesis titled "Blues as Metaphysical Music (Its Musicality and Ontological Underpinnings)". He initially released the album on his label, North Star Records, in December 1998. Rodgers supported the album with a North American tour. He was nominated for a W. C. Handy Award for "Best New Artist Debut".

== Production ==
Rodgers funded the album, which he produced and recorded over 18 months. Rodgers was influenced by Ralph Ellison's Juneteenth, which argued that the blues were a part of the lives of all Black Americans. He was also influenced by Jimmy Reed and Willie Dixon, whom he saw perform at his father's Indiana club. "Tuskegee Blues" is about the Tuskegee Syphilis Study. "Took Away the Drum" made use of kalimbas.

== Critical reception ==
Professional ratings
Review scores
Source	Rating
AllMusic	3/5 stars
Edmonton Journal	4/5 stars
The Penguin Guide to Blues Recordings	4/4 stars
The Philadelphia Inquirer	3/4 stars
The Press of Atlantic City	3/4 stars

Exclaim! wrote that the album "is no revivalist camp ... but a richly musical charge that recalls the work of the late Curtis Mayfield... Rodgers' deep, warm vocals embrace gospel and R&B, and his voice alternates between a powerful growl and a gentle caress across arrangements designed around solid hooks that first seduce the listener before driving home their message." The Daily Herald noted that, "where most contemporary blues songs are riffs built around hogging guitar solos, Rodgers brings a literate, philosophical punch to the genre." The Edmonton Journal said that "slices of soul, dips into R&B, some rootsy roadhouse arrangements and a voice that has lived every lyric, amounts to an impressive 11 songs." The Press of Atlantic City determined that "the album is uneven in spots, but Rodgers makes a valiant effort to do something different."

== Track listing ==
No.	Title	Length
1.	"Blues Is My Wailin' Wall"
2.	"Took Away the Drum"
3.	"Heaven's Got the Blues"
4.	"No Regrets"
5.	"Tuskegee Blues"
6.	"No Dough"
7.	"The Kennedy Song"
8.	"(Bring Back) Sweet Soul Music"
9.	"Willie B. and Me"
10.	"Gone Fishin'"
11.	"Shame!"
