= American Street Songs =

Studio album by Pink Anderson / Reverend Gary Davis
- Released: August 1956
- Recorded: May 29, 1950, and January 28, 1956
- Studio: Charlottesville, VA and New York City, NY
- Genre: Blues
- Length: 48:48
- Label: Riverside Folklore Series; RLP 12-611

Pink Anderson chronology
American Street Songs (1956)	Carolina Blues Man (1961)

Reverend Gary Davis chronology
The Singing Reverend (1954)	American Street Songs (1956)	Harlem Street Singer (1961)

American Street Songs, reissued as Gospel, Blues and Street Songs, is a shared album by blues musicians Pink Anderson and Reverend Gary Davis recorded in 1950 and 1956 and released on the Riverside Folklore Series label in August 1956.

== Reception ==
Professional ratings
Review scores
Source	Rating
AllMusic	4.5/5 stars
The Penguin Guide to Blues Recordings	3/4 stars

AllMusic reviewer Lindsay Planer stated: "these sides loom large in the available works of seminal blues icons Pink Anderson and Rev. Gary Davis. Both performers hail from the largely underappreciated Piedmont blues scene – which first began to flourish in the late 19th and early 20th centuries – near the North/South Carolina state border. Anderson's seven tracks were recorded in Charlottesville, VA, on May 29, 1950 – while he was literally on the road. His highly sophisticated and self-accompanied style of simultaneously picking and sliding – accomplished using a half-opened jackknife – could pass for an electronic effect. ... The Rev. Gary Davis side – which appropriately contains all spirituals – was recorded in N.Y.C. on January 28, 1956. However, Davis' delivery is steeped in the minstrel and street blues of his native Carolinas. Here is where the worlds of Davis and Anderson sonically intersect. As a performer, his clean and intricate acoustic picking and guttural vocalization stand as his trademark. Included here are several of the Reverend's most revered works".

== Track listing ==
All compositions are uncredited traditional blues/gospel except where noted

=== Pink Anderson Side: Carolina Street Ballads ===
1. "John Henry" – 5:25
2. "Every Day in The Week" – 3:30
3. "The Ship Titanic" – 3:14
4. "Greasy Greens" – 2:56
5. "Wreck of the Old '97" – 3:26
6. "I've Got Mine" – 3:05
7. "He's in The Jailhouse Now" (Jimmie Rodgers) – 3:42
- Recorded in Charlottesville, Virginia on May 29, 1950

=== Reverend Gary Davis Side: Harlem Street Spirituals ===
1. "Blow, Gabriel" – 2:14
2. "Twelve Gates to the City" – 3:23
3. "Samson and Delilah" – 3:52
4. "Oh Lord, Search My Heart" (Reverend Gary Davis) – 3:04
5. "Get Right Church" (Davis) – 3:05
6. "You Got to Go Down" (Davis) – 2:42
7. "Keep Your Lamp Trimmed and Burning" (Davis) – 2:36
8. "There Was a Time That I Was Blind" (Davis) – 2:38
- Recorded in New York City on January 28, 1956

== Personnel ==
=== Performance ===
- Pink Anderson – guitar, vocals
- Reverend Gary Davis – guitar, vocals
- Jumbo Lewis – washboard ("Every Day in The Week" only)

=== Production ===
- Paul Clayton (Pink Anderson Side), Kenneth S. Goldstein (Reverend Gary Davis Side) – engineer
