= Medicine Show Man =

Studio album by Pink Anderson
- Released: 1962
- Recorded: 1961
- Studio: New York City, NY
- Genre: Blues
- Length: 39:34
- Label: Bluesville; BVLP 1051
- Producer: Kenneth S. Goldstein

Pink Anderson chronology
Carolina Blues Man (1961)	Medicine Show Man (1962)	The Blues of Pink Anderson: Ballad & Folksinger (1963)

Medicine Show Man, subtitled Pink Anderson Vol. 2, is an album by blues musician Pink Anderson recorded in 1961 and released on the Bluesville label the following year.

== Reception ==
Professional ratings
Review scores
Source	Rating
AllMusic	4.5/5 stars
Gaslight Records	5.2/10
The Penguin Guide to Blues Recordings	3/4 stars

AllMusic reviewer Richie Unterberger stated: "it seems that Anderson sounds a bit more comfortable in the studio/recording setting on this one than on the others, and a tad less countrified and more urbane. The tone is cheerful and easygoing, like that of a well-loved man entertaining his neighbors. Which is not to say this is a throwaway; the phrasing and rhythms are crisp, and the ragtime-speckled folk/blues guitar accomplished". Roland Ellis of Gaslight Records said "Plain old pastoral blues is what it's all about here. Pink Anderson's Vol 2. Medicine Show Man sees travelin' folk fused with traditional blues in order to tell simple stories about lower class life in the southern United States and yep that's pretty much it. Relentlessly circular blues patterns. Twee, surface scratching lyrics. One guitar and one vocal and one unwaveringly steady dynamic. Light hearted blues might be paradoxical, but that's how this record could perhaps best be described ... Pink Anderson's Vol 2. Medicine Show Man albeit interesting from a socio-cultural perspective, really does lack that depth and backbone required to make a record feel memorable and timeless".

== Track listing ==
All compositions are uncredited traditional blues

1. "I Got Mine" – 3:37
2. "Greasy Greens" – 4:34
3. "I Got a Woman 'Way Cross Town" – 2:58
4. "Travelin' Man" – 4:35
5. "Ain't Nobody Home But Me" – 4:12
6. "That's No Way to Do" – 2:26
7. "In the Jailhouse Now" – 4:32
8. "South Forest Boogie" – 3:57
9. "Chicken" – 4:10
10. "I'm Going to Walk Through the Streets of the City" – 2:56

== Personnel ==
=== Performance ===
- Pink Anderson – guitar, vocals

=== Production ===
- Kenneth S. Goldstein – producer
- Samuel Charters – engineer
