= Sonny & Brownie =

Studio album by Sonny Terry & Brownie McGhee
- Released: 1973
- Recorded: 1973
- Genre: Blues
- Length: 44:34
- Label: A&M
- Producer: Hal Winn, Maurice Rodgers

Sonny Terry & Brownie McGhee chronology
I Couldn't Believe My Eyes (1973)	Sonny & Brownie (1973)

Professional ratings
Review scores
Source	Rating
Allmusic	4.5/5 stars
The Penguin Guide to Blues Recordings	3/4 stars

Sonny & Brownie is an album by the blues musicians Sonny Terry and Brownie McGhee. It was recorded at the Paramount Recording Studios (in Hollywood, California, United States) in 1973, and re-released in 1988 with digital remastering by Rudy Van Gelder at the Van Gelder Recording Studio.

== Track listing ==
1. "People Get Ready" (Curtis Mayfield)
2. "Bring It on Home to Me" (Sam Cooke)
3. "You Bring Out the Boogie in Me" (Michael Franks)
4. "Sail Away" (Randy Newman)
5. "Sonny's Thing" (Sonny Terry)
6. "White Boy Lost in the Blues" (Michael Franks)
7. "Battle Is Over (But the War Goes On)" (Jerry Winn, Maurice Rodgers)
8. "Walkin' My Blues Away" (Brownie McGhee, Sonny Terry)
9. "Big Wind (Is A' Comin')" (G. Michaels, Maurice Rodgers)
10. "Jesus Gonna Make It Alright" (Michael Franks)
11. "God and Man" (Maurice Rodgers)
12. "On the Road Again" (Brownie McGhee, Sonny Terry)

== Personnel ==
- Brownie McGhee - electric guitar (3, 5, 6, 7, 8, 12), acoustic guitar (1, 9, 11), guitar (2, 10), vocals (except 5)
- Sonny Terry - harmonica, vocals (2, 4, 6, 7, 8, 11, 12)
- Arlo Guthrie – acoustic guitar (1, 4), piano (11), vocals (4)
- Sugarcane Harris – violin (1, 2, 5)
- Michael Franks - acoustic guitar (1, 3, 9, 11, 12) and banjo (4)
- John Mayall - 12-string electric guitar (5, 7), piano (6, 8), harmonica (5, 6) and vocals (6)
- John Hammond - slide guitar (8)
- Jerry Cole – electric guitar (4, 8), banjo (9) and dobro (11)
- Jerry McGee – dobro (2, 10), electric guitar (3, 7)
- Al McKay – electric guitar (1, 7, 12)
- Harry Holt - bass guitar (except 5, 11)
- Maurice Rodgers – electric piano (1, 6, 7, 12), piano (2, 3, 4, 7, 10), thumb piano (4), Moog (9)
- Eddie Greene - drums
- Venetta Fields, Clydie King, Jackie Ward - background vocals (9)
- Marti McCall, Maxine Willard Waters, Jim Gilstrap - background vocals (1, 4, 10, 11)

Technical

- Bart Chiate - engineer
- Dean O. Torrence - artwork
- Norman Seeff - photography
