= Shirley Griffith =

American singer (1907–1974)

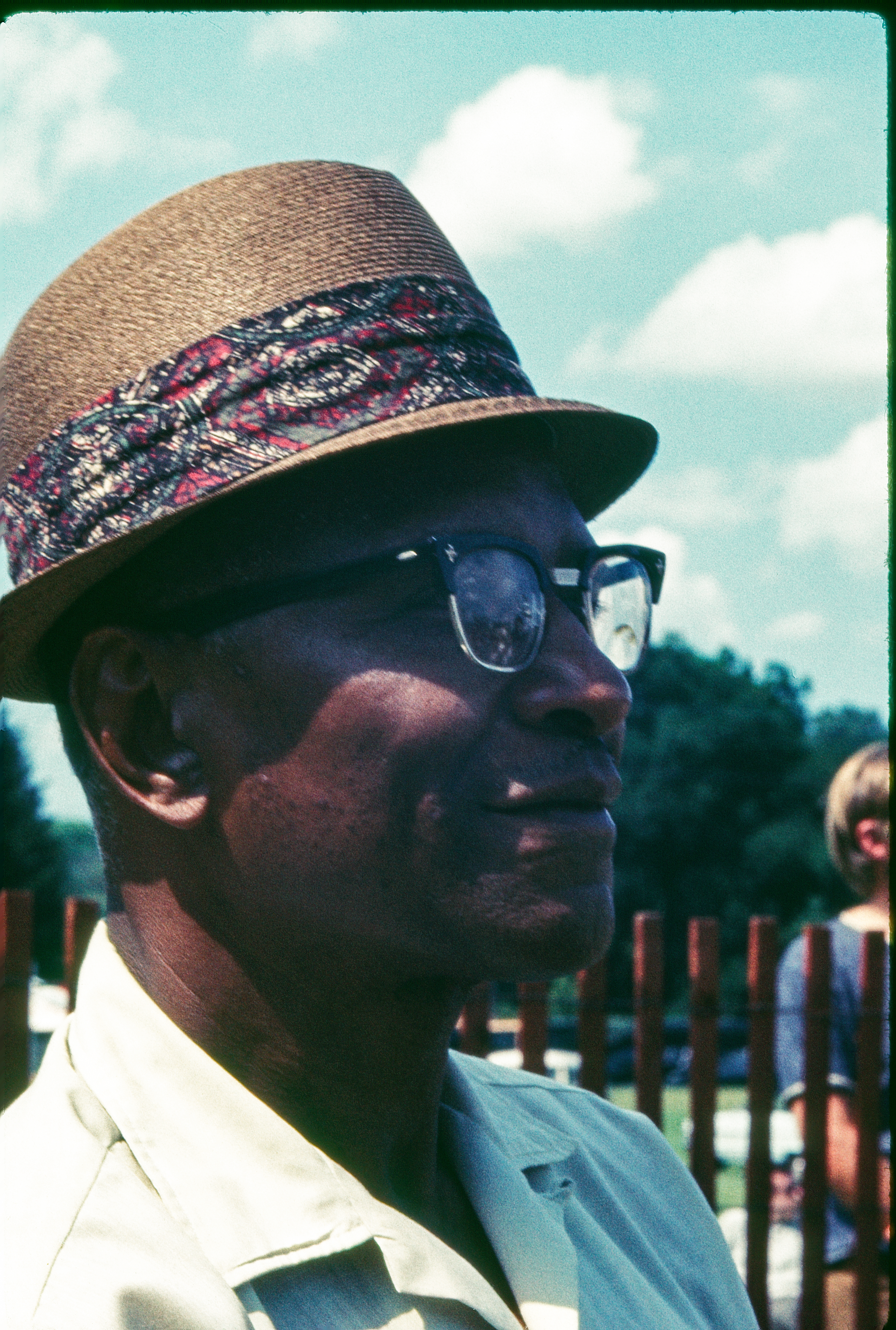
- Shirley Griffith at the Ann Arbor Blues Festival, 1970
- Born: April 26, 1907; Brandon, Mississippi, US
- Died: June 18, 1974 (aged 67) indianapolis, Indiana, US

Shirley Griffith (April 26, 1907 – June 18, 1974) was an American male blues singer and guitarist, mainly based in Indianapolis. He is best known for his recordings "Walkin' Blues" and "Bad Luck Blues".

== Early life ==
Griffith was born in Brandon, Mississippi, the second child of Willie and Maggie Griffith. He had five sisters and three brothers. He learned to play the guitar at the age of 10.

== Music career ==
In the 1920s, his friend and mentor Tommy Johnson gave him further guitar instruction, and offered to help him get started in a music career, but, by Griffith's own account, he was too “wild and reckless” in those days.

He settled in Indianapolis, where he lived for the rest of his life, working in automotive factories. While there he became friends with Scrapper Blackwell and Leroy Carr. In 1935, Carr offered to take Griffith to New York for a recording session, but Carr died suddenly, and the trip was never made.

Griffith re-emerged as a musician in the 1960s to record with J. T. Adams, and play at festivals with Yank Rachell. He performed at the first Ann Arbor Blues Festival in 1969 and at the Notre Dame Blues Festival in 1971.

== Recordings ==
Art Rosenbaum, who produced Griffith's Bluesville albums, wrote in the liner notes to Saturday Blues:

I recall one August afternoon shortly after these recordings were made; Shirley sat in Scrapper Blackwell's furnished room singing the Bye Bye Blues with such intensity that everyone present was deeply moved, though they had all heard him sing it many times before. Scrapper was playing, too, and the little room swelled with sound. When they finished there was a moment of awkward silence. Finally Shirley smiled and said, 'The blues'll kill you. And make you live, too.'

== Personal life ==
Griffith had four children. His first wife was Addie B. McNeil, His second wife was Elizabeth.

He died of heart disease in Indianapolis, at the age of 67.

== Discography ==
- The Blues of J. T. Adams and Shirley Griffith: Indiana Ave. Blues (LP album), Prestige Bluesville BVLP 1077 (1964)
- The Blues of Shirley Griffith: Saturday Blues (LP album), Prestige Bluesville BVLP 1087 (1965)
- Mississippi Blues (LP album), Blue Goose Records BG-2011 (1973)
