= Memphis Willie B. =

American singer (1911–1993)

- Born: William Borum; November 4, 1911; Shelby County, Tennessee, United States
- Died: October 5, 1993 (aged 81) Memphis, Tennessee, United States
- Genres: Memphis blues, Piedmont blues
- Occupations: Guitarist, singer, songwriter, musician
- Instruments: Guitar, harmonica, vocals
- Years active: Early 1930s–late 1960s
- Labels: Vocalion, Bluesville

Memphis Willie B. (November 4, 1911 – October 5, 1993) was an American Memphis blues guitarist, harmonica player, singer and songwriter.

He was known for his work with Jack Kelly's Jug Busters and the Memphis Jug Band. His career was revived in the 1960s after years away from the music industry. He recorded "The Stuff Is Here" and "Stop Cryin' Blues". His 1961 song "Overseas Blues" retrospectively expressed the fear of World War II servicemen who had survived the conflict in Europe and were sent to fight in the Pacific War.

== Biography ==
He was born William Borum in Shelby County, Tennessee. He was taught to play the guitar by his father, and he busked with Jack Kelly's Jug Busters in his teenage years. He quickly moved on to work with the Memphis Jug Band, which played locally and at Mardi Gras in New Orleans. He extended his repertoire after being taught to play the harmonica by Noah Lewis.

Willie B. developed away from a disciplined jug band style and played at various locations with Robert Johnson, Garfield Akers, Sonny Boy Williamson II and Willie Brown, who periodically travelled up from the Mississippi Delta to play. Willie B. first recorded at the age of 23, in September 1934 in New York City, for Vocalion Records. He soon returned to working in the Memphis area, in the company of Little Son Joe, Will Shade and Joe Hill Louis.

He enlisted in the U.S. Army in January 1942 and served in the North African invasion (Operation Torch) in December 1942 and later in Italy. After being discharged from the Army, he discovered it hard to find work as a musician and eventually took up other employment. He returned to the music industry in the early 1960s and recorded sufficient material for two albums for Bluesville Records in Memphis in 1961. This provided the impetus for a resurgence in his musical career, and he played at various music festivals and in coffeehouses. He often performed with Gus Cannon and Furry Lewis, reliving their early Memphis days.

Willie B. once stated, "A blues is about something that's real. It's about what a man feels when his wife leaves him, or about some disappointment that happens to him that he can't do anything about. That's why none of these young boys can really sing the blues. They don't know about the things that go into a blues".

He abruptly stopped playing in the late 1960s, and little was heard of him until his death, in 1993, at the age of 81.

== Discography ==
=== Studio albums ===
| Year | Title | Record label |
|---|---|---|
| 1961 | Introducing Memphis Willie B. | Bluesville |
| 1962 | Hard Working Man Blues | Bluesville |

=== Compilation ===
| Year | Title | Record label |
|---|---|---|
| 2012 | A Mess of Blues | Black Cat |

== See also ==
- List of Memphis blues musicians
- List of Piedmont blues musicians
