= Sonny Is King =

Studio album by Sonny Terry
- Released: 1963
- Recorded: October 26, 1960 & September 1962
- Studio: Van Gelder, Englewood Cliffs, NJ & New York City
- Genre: Blues
- Length: 33:17
- Label: Bluesville; BVLP 1059
- Producer: Ozzie Cadena, Kenneth S. Goldstein

Sonny Terry chronology
Sonny Terry and Brownie McGhee at Sugar Hill (1961)	Sonny Is King (1963)	Blues Hoot (1963)

Sonny Is King is an album by blues musician Sonny Terry, recorded in sessions in 1960 and 1962 and released on the Bluesville label.

== Reception ==
Professional ratings
Review scores
Source	Rating
AllMusic	3/5 stars
The Penguin Guide to Blues Recordings	2.5/4 stars

AllMusic reviewer Thom Owens stated: "Half of Sonny Is King is devoted to a rare session between Sonny Terry and Lightnin' Hopkins ... but the rhythm section fails to kick the pair into overdrive, and much of the music disappointingly meanders ... That's proven by the second side of the album, where Terry falls into the comfortable setting of duetting with Brownie McGhee. While these aren't among the duo's very best recordings, they are nonetheless enjoyable, suggesting that there's something to be said for the familiar".

== Track listing ==
All compositions by Sonny Terry

1. "One Monkey Don't Stop the Show" – 3:04
2. "Changed the Lock On My Door" – 3:30
3. "Tater Pie" – 2:32
4. "She's So Sweet" – 2:39
5. "Diggin' My Potatoes" 3:32
6. "Sonny's Coming" – 2:50
7. "Ida Mae" – 3:10
8. "Callin' My Mama" – 2:33
9. "Bad Luck" – 4:10
10. "Blues from the Bottom" – 4:17

== Personnel ==
- Sonny Terry – harmonica, vocals
- Lightnin' Hopkins (tracks 1–5), Brownie McGhee (tracks 6–10) – guitar
- Leonard Gaskin – bass (tracks 1–5)
- Belton Evans – drums (tracks 1–5)
- Ozzie Cadena (tracks 1–5), Kenneth S. Goldstein (tracks 6–10) – producer
- Rudy Van Gelder – engineer
