= Sonny's Story =

Studio album by Sonny Terry
- Released: 1960
- Recorded: October 13, 1960
- Studio: Van Gelder, Englewood Cliffs, NJ
- Genre: Blues
- Length: 35:17
- Label: Bluesville; BVLP 1025

Sonny Terry chronology
Blues in My Soul (1960)	Sonny's Story (1960)	Last Night Blues (1961)

Sonny's Story is an album by blues musician Sonny Terry, recorded in 1960 and released on the Bluesville label.

== Reception ==
Professional ratings
Review scores
Source	Rating
AllMusic	3/5 stars
The Penguin Guide to Blues Recordings	4/4 stars

AllMusic reviewer Thom Owens stated: "Sonny's Story is an excellent showcase for Sonny Terry's talents, which sometimes went unheralded because they largely were showcased in the shadow of Brownie McGhee ... Sonny's Story is positively infectious. It's hard not to get caught up in Terry's shouts and boogies, and that's one major reason why this is among his best solo recordings".

== Track listing ==
All compositions by Sonny Terry

1. "I Ain't Gonna Be Your Dog No More" – 3:44
2. "My Baby Done Gone" – 3:24
3. "Worried Blues" – 3:55
4. "High Powered Woman" – 2:59
5. "Pepperheaded Woman" – 4:06
6. "Sonny's Story" – 3:26
7. "I'm Gonna Get on My Feets Afterwhile" – 4:04
8. "Four O'Clock Blues" – 3:34
9. "Telephone Blues" – 3:35
10. "Great Tall Engine" – 2:56

== Personnel ==
=== Performance ===
- Sonny Terry – harmonica, vocals
- J. C. Burris – harmonica
- Sticks McGhee – guitar
- Belton Evans – drums

=== Production ===
- Rudy Van Gelder – engineer
