= Lightnin' in New York =

Studio album by Lightnin' Hopkins
- Released: 1961
- Recorded: November 15, 1960
- Studio: Nola Penthouse Sound Studios, NYC
- Genre: Blues
- Length: 43:33
- Label: Candid; CJM 8010
- Producer: Nat Hentoff

Lightnin' Hopkins chronology
Lightnin' (1961)	Lightnin' in New York (1961)	Mojo Hand (1962)

Lightnin' in New York is an album by the blues musician Lightnin' Hopkins, recorded in 1960 and released on the Candid label the following year.

== Reception ==
Professional ratings
Review scores
Source	Rating
AllMusic	3/5 stars
The Penguin Guide to Blues Recordings	3.5/4 stars

AllMusic reviewer Scott Yanow stated: "This solo CD features the classic bluesman Lightnin' Hopkins on eight unaccompanied solos, not only singing and playing guitar but taking some rare solos on piano (including on 'Lightnin's Piano Boogie'). Hopkins recorded a lot of albums in the 1960s and all are quite listenable even if most are not essential; he did tend to ramble at times! This Candid release is one of his better sets of the period". The Penguin Guide to Blues Recordings wrote: "Thanks to the engineer Bob d'Orleans, Lightnin' in New York sounds wonderful, and Lightnin' seems to feel specially at ease, essaying experiments that he seldom or never repeated".

== Track listing ==
All compositions by Sam "Lightnin'" Hopkins

1. "Take It Easy" – 6:21
2. "Mighty Crazy" – 7:04
3. "Your Own Fault, Baby, to Treat Me the Way You Do" – 4:44
4. "I've Had My Fun If I Don't Get Well No More" – 3:55
5. "The Trouble Blues" – 4:42
6. "Lightnin's Piano Boogie" – 2:29
7. "Wonder Why" – 6:12
8. "Mister Charlie" – 7:26

== Personnel ==
=== Performance ===
- Lightnin' Hopkins – guitar, vocals, piano

=== Production ===
- Nat Hentoff – supervision
- Bob D'Orleans – engineer
