= Lightnin' Sam Hopkins =

Studio album by Lightnin' Hopkins
- Released: 1962
- Recorded: November 26, 1961, December 2, 1961 and January 23, 1962
- Studio: Berkeley, CA and Houston, TX
- Genre: Blues
- Length: 42:09
- Label: Arhoolie; F 1011
- Producer: Chris Strachwitz

Lightnin' Hopkins chronology
| Blues Hoot (1961) | Lightnin' Sam Hopkins (1962) | Walkin' This Road by Myself (1962) |

Lightnin' Sam Hopkins is an album by blues musician Lightnin' Hopkins recorded in California in late 1961 and Texas in early 1962 and released on the Arhoolie label.

== Reception ==
Professional ratings
Review scores
| Source | Rating |
|---|---|
| AllMusic | 4/5 stars |

AllMusic reviewer Eugene Chadbourne stated: "This recording is one of the best attempts to combine the eccentric blues structures of Houston's Lightnin' Hopkins with some kind of band backup. ... The duets with drummer Spider Kilpatrick seemed a revelation at the time, as finally here was a musician who could follow Hopkins wherever he went, plus one providing a snappier beat that the guitarist could hang phrases of a bit more aggressive nature than usual on. ... these were instances where Hopkins took advantage of the group sound to play in a little bit different manner, and although these blues have a more set and normal blues structure, at least by Hopkins' standard, they work quite well and are recorded with quite a lot of impact".

== Track listing ==
All compositions by Sam "Lightnin'" Hopkins

1. "Meet You at the Chicken Shack" – 5:40
2. "Once Was a Gambler" – 4:55
3. "Speedin' Boogie" – 3:08
4. "Ice Storm Blues" – 7:19
5. "California Showers" – 7:49
6. "Burnin' in L.A." – 4:31
7. "Do the Boogie" – 1:50
8. "Bald Headed Woman" – 3:50
9. "Goin' Out" – 3:07
- Recorded at Sierra Sound Laboratories in Berkeley, California on November 26, 1961 (tracks 2, 3 & 6–9), at Chris Strachwitz' Apartment, Berkeley on December 2, 1961 (track 5), and at ACA Studios in Houston, Texas on January 23, 1962 (tracks 1 & 4)

== Personnel ==
=== Performance ===
- Lightnin' Hopkins – guitar, vocals, piano
- Gino Landry (tracks 2, 3 & 6–9) – bass
- Spider Kilpatrick (tracks 1 & 4), Victor Leonard (tracks 2, 3 & 6–9) – drums

=== Production ===
- Chris Strachwitz – producer
