= Big Road Blues =

Studio album by K. C. Douglas
- Released: 1961
- Recorded: 1961
- Studio: Oakland, California
- Genre: Blues
- Length: 38:48
- Label: Bluesville; BVLP 1050
- Producer: Kenneth S. Goldstein, Chris Strachwitz

K. C. Douglas chronology
K. C.'s Blues (1961)	Big Road Blues (1961)	The Country Boy (1974)

Big Road Blues is an album by blues musician K. C. Douglas recorded in 1961 and released on the Bluesville label.

Professional ratings
Review scores
Source	Rating
AllMusic	3/5 stars
The Penguin Guide to Blues Recordings	4/4 stars

== Track listing ==
1. "Big Road Blues" (Tommy Johnson) – 3:25
2. "Howling Blues" (Chester Burnett) – 2:48
3. "Move to Kansas City" (Jim Jackson) – 2:29
4. "Buck Dance" (Traditional) – 3:00
5. "Tore Your Playhouse Down" (Traditional) – 3:19
6. "Bottle Up and Go" (Tommy McClennan) – 4:00
7. "Whiskey Headed Woman" (William Dupree) – 3:31
8. "Catfish Blues" (K.C. Douglas) – 3:10
9. "K.C.'s Blues" (Douglas) – 5:04
10. "Canned Heat" (Johnson) – 3:52
11. "Key to the Highway" (William Broonzy) – 4:10

== Personnel ==
=== Performance ===
- K. C. Douglas – guitar, vocals

=== Production ===
- Kenneth S. Goldstein, Chris Strachwitz – producer
- Chris Strachwitz – engineer
