= Mojo Hand =

Studio album by Lightnin' Hopkins
- Released: 1962
- Recorded: November 1960
- Studio: New York City
- Genre: Blues
- Length: 32:49
- Label: Fire; FLP 104
- Producer: Bobby Robinson

Lightnin' Hopkins chronology
Lightnin' in New York (1961)	Mojo Hand (1962)	Blues in My Bottle (1961)

Mojo Hand is an album by the blues musician Lightnin' Hopkins, recorded in 1960 and released on the Fire label in 1962.

== Reception ==
Professional ratings
Review scores
Source	Rating
AllMusic	4.5/5 stars
The Penguin Guide to Blues Recordings	3/4 stars

AllMusic reviewer Tim Sheridan stated: "This album, recorded for Fire Records, is especially interesting because it casts Hopkins in a more R&B-flavored environment. This obvious effort to get a hit makes for some excellent blues; moody and powerful performances play throughout. There's even a charming novelty Christmas blues". The Penguin Guide to Blues Recordings wrote that "Lightnin' is focussed and businesslike and delivers a strong and varied sequence of songs; the bassist and drummer unobtrusive but very much there".

== Track listing ==
All compositions credited to Sam "Lightnin'" Hopkins, M. Robinson and C. Lewis

1. "Mojo Hand" – 2:55
2. "Coffee for Mama" – 3:25
3. "Awful Dreams" – 4:50
4. "Black Mare Trot" – 3:55
5. "Have You Ever Loved a Woman" – 2:38
6. "Glory Be" – 4:25
7. "Sometimes She Will" – 2:30
8. "Shine On, Moon!" – 4:17
9. "Santa" – 3:44

== Personnel ==
=== Performance ===
- Lightnin' Hopkins – guitar, vocals, piano
- Unknown musician – bass
- Delmar Donnell – drums

=== Production ===
- Bobby Robinson – producer
