= Pink Anderson =

American blues singer and guitarist

- Anderson and his son "Little Pink" Anderson in the 1960s

Background information
- Born: Pinkney Anderson; February 12, 1900; Laurens, South Carolina, U.S.
- Died: October 12, 1974 (aged 74) Spartanburg, South Carolina, U.S.
- Genres: Piedmont blues; country blues
- Instruments: Guitar; vocals
- Years active: 1930s–1960s

Pinkney "Pink" Anderson (February 12, 1900 – October 12, 1974) was an American blues singer and guitarist.

== Life and career ==
Anderson was born in Laurens, South Carolina, and raised in nearby Greenville and Spartanburg. He joined Dr. William R. Kerr of the Indian Remedy Company in 1914 to entertain the crowds, while Kerr tried to sell a concoction purported to have medicinal qualities. During this time Anderson occasionally worked with Blind Simmie Dooley in the Spartanburg area, recording with him in 1928 for the Columbia label. In the 1950s, Anderson toured with Leo "Chief Thundercloud" Kahdot of the Potawatomi tribal nation and his medicine show, often with the harmonica player Arthur "Peg Leg Sam" Jackson, who was based in Jonesville, South Carolina.

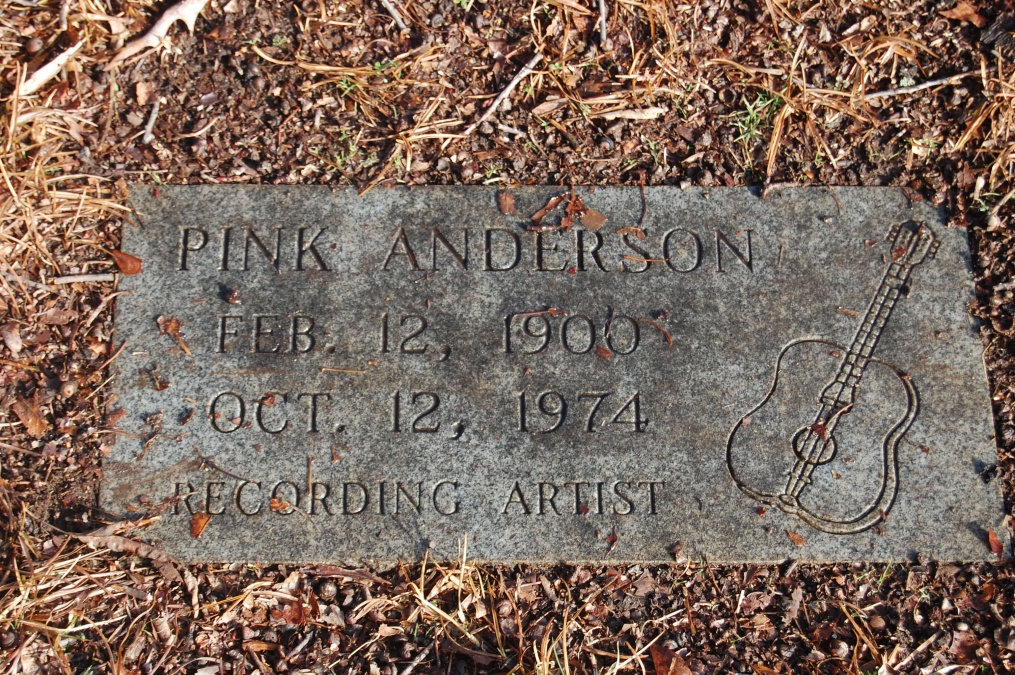
Cemetery marker for Anderson in Lincoln Memorial Garden, with a Gibson J-50 guitar

Anderson was recorded by the folklorist Paul Clayton at the Virginia State Fair in May 1950. He recorded an album in the early 1960s and performed at some live venues. He appeared in the 1963 film The Bluesmen. Anderson reduced his activities in the late 1960s after a stroke. Attempts by the folklorist Peter B. Lowry to record Anderson in 1970 were not successful, although apparently he could occasionally summon up some of his past abilities. A final tour took place in the early 1970s with the aid of Roy Book Binder, one of his students, taking him to Boston and New York City.

Anderson died in October 1974 of a heart attack, at the age of 74. He is interred at Lincoln Memorial Gardens, in Spartanburg.

Anderson's son, known as Little Pink Anderson (born July 13, 1954), is a bluesman living in Vermillion, South Dakota.

== The Pink in Pink Floyd ==
Syd Barrett, of English rock band Pink Floyd, created the band's name by juxtaposing the first names of Anderson and North Carolina bluesman Floyd Council; he had noticed the names in the liner notes of a 1962 album by Blind Boy Fuller.

== Discography ==
=== Singles ===
- "Papa's About to Get Mad" / "Gonna Tip Out Tonight", Pink Anderson and Simmie Dooley (recorded April 14, 1928), Columbia 14336-D
- "Every Day in the Week Blues" / "C.C. and O. Blues", Pink Anderson and Simmie Dooley (recorded April 14, 1928), Columbia 14400-D

=== Albums ===
- American Street Songs (Riverside, 1956) – shared album with Reverend Gary Davis
- Carolina Blues Man (Bluesville, 1961)
- Medicine Show Man (Bluesville, 1962)
- Ballad & Folksinger (Bluesville, 1963)
- Carolina Medicine Show Hokum & Blues (Folkways, 1961–62 [1984])

== See also ==
- List of blues musicians
- List of country blues musicians
- List of people from South Carolina
- List of Piedmont blues musicians
