= Down South Summit Meetin' =

Studio album by Brownie McGhee, Lightnin' Hopkins, Big Joe Williams and Sonny Terry
- Released: 1960
- Recorded: July 6, 1960
- Studio: World Pacific, Los Angeles, CA
- Genre: Blues
- Length: 36:24
- Label: World Pacific; WP-1296
- Producer: Richard Bock, Ed Michel

Lightnin' Hopkins chronology
Autobiography in Blues (1960)	Down South Summit Meetin' (1960)	Last Night Blues (1960)

Down South Summit Meetin' (also released as First Meetin' and Lightnin' Hopkins & the Blues Summit) is an album by the blues musicians Brownie McGhee, Lightnin' Hopkins, Big Joe Williams and Sonny Terry, recorded in 1960 and released on the World Pacific label.

== Reception ==
Professional ratings
Review scores
Source	Rating
AllMusic	3/5 stars
The Penguin Guide to Blues Recordings	3/4 stars

AllMusic reviewer Stewart Mason called it "a well-lubricated studio jam session". The Penguin Guide to Blues Recordings awarded the album 3 stars, noting: "The atmosphere is charged with the electricity of several wiley old blues musicians topping each other's tricks. their occasionally, and perhaps not always entirely playfully, barbed sides add a whiff of brimstone. Altogether the performance tells us things about the four men that their other records don't generally convey, and anyone with a special fondness for any of the artists really aught to hear it".

== Track listing ==
All compositions by Sam "Lightnin'" Hopkins except where noted

1. "Ain't Nothin' Like Whiskey" – 7:50
2. "Penitentiary Blues" (Traditional) – 5:08
3. "If You Steal My Chickens, You Can't Make Em Lay" (Big Joe Williams) – 5:37
4. "First Meeting" (Hopkins, Brownie McGhee) – 7:10
5. "How Long Have It Been Since You Been Home?" – 4:10
6. "Wimmin from Coast to Coast" – 5:46

== Personnel ==
Performance

- Brownie McGhee, Lightnin' Hopkins, Big Joe Williams – guitar, vocals
- Sonny Terry – harmonica, vocals
- Jimmy Bond – bass

Production

- Richard Bock, Ed Michel – producer
