= I Couldn't Believe My Eyes =

Studio album by Brownie McGhee and Sonny Terry with Earl Hooker
- Released: 1973
- Recorded: September 14, 1969
- Studio: Vault, Los Angeles, CA
- Genre: Blues
- Length: 38:50
- Label: BluesWay; BL/BLS 6059
- Producer: Ed Michel

Sonny Terry and Brownie McGhee chronology
A Long Way from Home (1969)	I Couldn't Believe My Eyes (1973)	Sonny & Brownie (1973)

I Couldn't Believe My Eyes is an album by blues musicians Brownie McGhee and Sonny Terry with Earl Hooker, recorded in 1969 but not released by the BluesWay label until 1973.

Professional ratings
Review scores
Source	Rating
AllMusic	3/5 stars
The Penguin Guide to Blues Recordings	2.5/4 stars

== Track listing ==
All compositions credited to Brownie McGhee except where noted

1. "Black Cat Bone" (Brownie McGhee, Sonny Terry) – 3:16
2. "Brownie's New Blues" – 4:59
3. "Poor Man Blues" (Terry) – 2:49
4. "Tell Me Why" – 6:16
5. "My Baby's Fine" (Terry) – 3:03
6. "Don't Wait for Me" – 3:21
7. "I'm in Love with You Baby" (Terry) – 4:28
8. "Parcel Post Blues" – 4:27
9. "When I Was Drinkin'" (Terry) – 2:42
10. "I Couldn't Believe My Eyes" – 3:29

== Personnel ==
- Brownie McGhee – guitar, vocals
- Sonny Terry – harmonica, vocals
- Earl Hooker – guitar
- Ray Johnson – piano, electric piano
- Jimmy Bond – bass
- Panama Francis – drums
- Clark Kidder, George McGhee, Marsha Smith – vocals (tracks 1, 3 & 6)
