= K. C.'s Blues =

Studio album by K. C. Douglas
- Released: 1961
- Recorded: 1961
- Studio: Oakland, California
- Genre: Blues
- Length: 40:19
- Label: Bluesville; BVLP 1023
- Producer: Kenneth S. Goldstein, Chris Strachwitz

K. C. Douglas chronology
A Dead-Beat Guitar and the Mississippi Blues (1956)	K. C.'s Blues (1961)	Big Road Blues (1962)

K. C.'s Blues is an album by blues musician K. C. Douglas recorded in 1961 and released on the Bluesville label.

== Reception ==
Professional ratings
Review scores
Source	Rating
AllMusic	4/5 stars
The Penguin Guide to Blues Recordings	3/4 stars

AllMusic stated: "K.C.'s Blues consists primarily of original compositions that showcase Douglas' easy-rolling, relaxed style perfectly".

== Track listing ==
All compositions by K. C. Douglas

1. "Broken Heart" – 3:04
2. "Henhouse Blues" – 4:07
3. "Wake Up, Working Woman" – 2:31
4. "Rootin' Ground Hog" – 3:30
5. "Meanest Woman" – 3:11
6. "Born in the Country" – 3:54
7. "Love Me All Night Long" – 2:29
8. "Tell Me" – 3:16
9. "No More Cryin'" – 2:38
10. "K.C.'s Doctor Blues" – 4:01
11. "You Got a Good Thing Now" – 3:58
12. "Watch Dog Blues" – 4:29

== Personnel ==
=== Performance ===
- K. C. Douglas – guitar, vocals

=== Production ===
- Kenneth S. Goldstein, Chris Strachwitz – producer
- Chris Strachwitz – engineer
