= Carolina Blues Man =

Studio album by Pink Anderson
- Released: 1961
- Recorded: April 12, 1961
- Studio: Spartanburg, SC
- Genre: Blues
- Length: 39:40
- Label: Bluesville; BVLP 1038
- Producer: Kenneth S. Goldstein

Pink Anderson chronology
American Street Songs (1961)	Carolina Blues Man (1961)	Medicine Show Man (1962)

Carolina Blues Man, subtitled Pink Anderson Volume I, is an album by blues musician Pink Anderson recorded in 1961 and released on the Bluesville label.

== Reception ==
Professional ratings
Review scores
Source	Rating
AllMusic	4.5/5 stars
The Penguin Guide to Blues Recordings	3/4 stars

AllMusic reviewer Lindsay Planer stated: "Carolina Blues Man finds Anderson performing solo – with his own acoustic guitar accompaniment – during a session cut on his home turf of Spartanburg, SC. Much – if not all – of the material Anderson plays has been filtered through and tempered by the unspoken blues edict of taking a familiar (read: traditional) standard and individualizing it enough to make it uniquely one's own creation. Anderson's approach is wholly inventive, as is the attention to detail in his vocal inflections, lyrical alterations, and, perhaps more importantly, Anderson's highly sophisticated implementation of tricky fretwork. His trademark style incorporates a combination of picking and strumming chords interchangeably. This nets Anderson an advanced, seemingly electronically enhanced sound. Aficionados and most all students of the blues will inevitably consider this release an invaluable primer into the oft-overlooked southern East Coast Piedmont blues".

== Track listing ==
All compositions are uncredited traditional blues except where noted

1. "My Baby Left Me This Morning" – 3:38
2. "Baby, Please Don't Go" (Big Joe Williams) – 2:45
3. "Mama Where Did You Stay Last Night" – 3:47
4. "Big House Blues" – 4:04
5. "Meet Me in the Bottom" – 3:52
6. "Weeping Willow Blues" – 3:52
7. "Baby I'm Going Away" – 2:58
8. "Thousand Woman Blues" – 3:45
9. "I Had My Fun" – 4:37
10. "Every Day in the Week Blues" – 3:49
11. "Try Some of That" – 2:33

== Personnel ==
=== Performance ===
- Pink Anderson – guitar, vocals

=== Production ===
- Kenneth S. Goldstein – producer
- Samuel B. Charters – engineer

Chart (2025)	Peak position
Greek Albums (IFPI)	100
