= Stick McGhee =

American songwriter (1918–1961)

- Born: Granville Henry McGhee; March 23, 1918; Knoxville, Tennessee, United States
- Died: August 15, 1961 (aged 43) The Bronx, New York, United States
- Genres: Jump blues, rhythm and blues, electric blues
- Occupations: Guitarist, singer, songwriter
- Instrument: Guitar
- Years active: 1940s–1960
- Labels: Various, including Atlantic
- Formerly of: Brownie McGhee, J. Mayo Williams

Granville Henry "Stick" McGhee (March 23, 1918 – August 15, 1961) was an American jump blues guitarist, singer and songwriter, best known for his blues song "Drinkin' Wine, Spo-Dee-O-Dee", which he wrote with J. Mayo Williams.

== Early life ==
McGhee was born in Knoxville, Tennessee, and grew up in Kingsport, Tennessee. He received his nickname when he was a child. He used a stick to push a wagon carrying his older brother Brownie McGhee, who had contracted polio. Granville began playing the guitar when he was thirteen years old. After his freshman year he dropped out of high school and worked with his father at the Eastman Kodak subsidiary, Tennessee Eastman Company in Kingsport. In 1940, Granville quit his job and moved to Portsmouth, Virginia, and then to New York City. He entered the military in 1942 and served in the U.S. Army during World War II. After being discharged in 1946, he settled in New York.

== Entertainment career ==
In the military, McGhee often played his guitar. One of the songs he performed was "Drinkin' Wine, Spo-Dee-O-Dee", one of the earliest prototypical rock-and-roll songs. Cover versions were recorded by Wynonie Harris, Lionel Hampton, Big John Greer, Johnny Burnette, Jerry Lee Lewis, and Mike Bloomfield's Electric Flag (as "Wine"). The song lent its name to the alcoholic fruit drink spodi. In 1946 Granville and Brownie McGhee wrote a version of the song that did not use profanity. Harlem Records released the new version in January 1947. It sold for 49 cents. It did not get much airplay until two years later, when Stick re-created the song for Atlantic Records. It was on the Billboard R&B chart for almost half a year, rising to number 2, where it stayed for four weeks.

Numerous cover versions of his songs were recorded over the years. The first cover was by Lionel Hampton, featuring Sonny Parker; next was a cover by Wynonie Harris, followed by a hillbilly-bop version by Loy Gordon & His Pleasant Valley Boys. "Drinkin' Wine, Spo-Dee-O-Dee" continued to be popular throughout the 1950s in cover versions by various artists, including Malcolm Yelvington in 1954, Johnny Burnette in 1957, and Jerry Lee Lewis in 1959.

McGhee continued to make records for Atlantic and created popular songs such as "Tennessee Waltz Blues", "Drank Up All the Wine Last Night", "Venus Blues", "Let's Do It", and "One Monkey Don't Stop No Show", but his music career overall was not successful. McGhee moved from Atlantic to Essex Records, for which he recorded "My Little Rose". The record was not commercially successful, so he moved to King Records in 1953. There he recorded a number of rock-and-roll songs, such a "Whiskey, Women and Loaded Dice", "Head Happy with Wine", "Jungle Juice", "Six to Eight", "Double Crossin' Liquor", "Dealin' from the Bottom", and "Get Your Mind Out of the Gutter". However, he was unable to make money from his records, so he left King for Savoy Records in 1955. In the late 1950s McGhee recorded album tracks with Sonny Terry for the Folkways and Prestige-Bluesville labels. In 1960 he cut the songs "Sleep in Job" and "Money Fever" in New York with Terry. The tracks were released on Herald Records. This was McGhee's last recording session. He retired from the music industry in 1960. He became ill shortly afterward and died in August 1961.

== Death ==
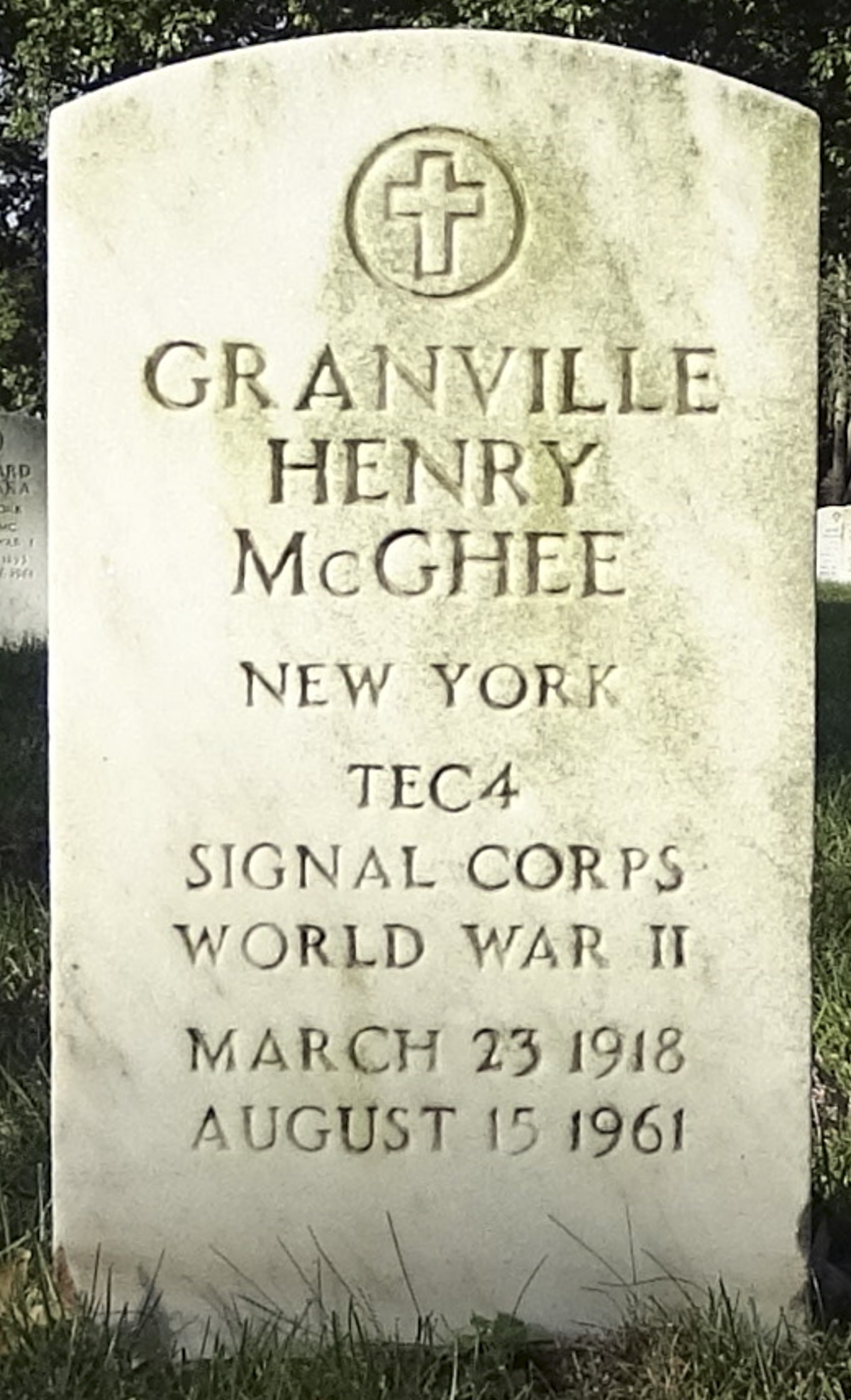
Grave of McGhee at Long Island National Cemetery

McGhee died of lung cancer in The Bronx, New York, on August 15, 1961, at the age of forty-three. He left his old guitar to Brownie's son before he died. McGhee was interred at Long Island National Cemetery on August 21, 1961.

== Discography ==
With Sonny Terry

- Sonny's Story (Bluesville, 1960)

== See also ==
- List of people from Tennessee
