= Mercury Blues =

1949 single by K. C. Douglas Trio

"Mercury Boogie"

Single by K. C. Douglas Trio
- B-side: "Eclipse of the Sun"
- Released: 1949
- Recorded: 1948 in Oakland, California
- Genre: Blues
- Label: Down Town
- Songwriters: K. C. Douglas, Robert Geddins

K. C. Douglas singles chronology
"Mercury Boogie" (1949)	"Lonely Blues" (1954)

Official audio
- "Mercury Boogie" on YouTube

"Mercury Blues" is a song written by rural blues musician K. C. Douglas and Robert Geddins, and first recorded by Douglas in 1948. The song, originally titled "Mercury Boogie," pays homage to the American automobile marque, which ended production in 2010.

Rights to the song were purchased by the Ford Motor Company (who already owned the Mercury marque). Ford, in turn, used it for a 1996 television commercial featuring country musician Alan Jackson singing his 1993 version of the song with the word "Mercury" replaced by the words "Ford Truck."

The song has been covered by many musicians. Among the most notable versions are ones by Jackson, rock musician David Lindley, from his 1981 album El Rayo-X, and rock musician Steve Miller, from his 1976 album Fly Like an Eagle. Lindley's single peaked at number 34 on the Billboard Hot Mainstream Rock Tracks chart.

== Alan Jackson version ==
"Mercury Blues"

Single by Alan Jackson

from the album A Lot About Livin' (And a Little 'bout Love)
- B-side: "Tropical Depression"
- Released: September 13, 1993
- Recorded: May 26, 1992
- Genre: Country, rockabilly
- Length: 3:39
- Label: Arista
- Songwriters: K. C. Douglas; Robert Geddins
- Producer: Keith Stegall

Alan Jackson singles chronology
"Chattahoochee" (1993)	"Mercury Blues" (1993)	"(Who Says) You Can't Have It All" (1994)

Official video
- "Mercury Blues" on YouTube

American country music artist Alan Jackson recorded the song for his 1993 album, A Lot About Livin' (And a Little 'bout Love). It was released in September 1993 as the fourth single from the album. His version of the song peaked at number 2 on both the U.S. Billboard Hot Country Singles & Tracks (now Hot Country Songs) chart and the RPM Country Tracks in Canada.

=== Critical reception ===
Kevin John Coryne of Country Universe gave the song a B grade, calling it "a throwaway track that ended up being a pretty big hit." He went on to say that it "might be the least essential Jackson hit of its era."

=== Music video ===
The music video was directed by Piers Plowden and premiered in mid-1993. Keith Urban makes an appearance in the video as a guitar player.

=== In popular culture ===
Jackson's rendition was used by the Ford Motor Company for Ford pickup truck commercials, changing the line "crazy 'bout a Mercury" to "crazy 'bout a Ford truck." Jackson performed the original "Mercury" version of the song live "in-studio" on an episode of the hit ABC sitcom Home Improvement in 1996. The David Lindley version appeared on the "Florence Italy" episode of Miami Vice on February 14, 1986.

=== Chart positions ===
Chart (1993)	Peak position
Canada Country Singles (RPM)	2
US Hot Country Songs (Billboard)	2

=== Year-end charts ===
Chart (1993)	Position
Canada Country Tracks (RPM)	29
