= Gospel Plow =

Traditional African American song

"Keep Your Hand on the Plow"
Tune for Keep Your Hand on the Plow

"Gospel Plow" (also known as "Hold On" and "Keep Your Hand on the Plow") is a traditional African American spiritual. It is listed in the Roud Folk Song Index, number 10075. The title is biblical, based on Luke 9:62. (Note: And Jesus said unto him, No man, having put his hand to the plough, and looking back, is fit for the kingdom of God.)

The earliest date in which this spiritual appears in written form is in 1917, in the Cecil Sharp Collection, while the earliest recording is from 1930 under the title of "Keep Yo' Hand on the Plow, Hold On" by the Hall Johnson Negro Choir.

Like most African American spirituals, "Gospel Plow" can be defined as a "musical poem, not attributable to any specific poet or composer" that describes some aspect of the "early Afro-American's view of life."

The allusion to the plow makes clear reference to the enslaved condition of African Americans working in the fields. Presumably, this spiritual must have been a message of encouragement connected to Luke 9:62's teaching that to keep plowing is to be fit for the kingdom of God.

Writing in 1941, musicologists John A. Lomax and Alan Lomax associated the song with the Holiness Church. Their published version refers to the New Testament stories of Paul and Silas in jail (Acts 16:13-32) and of Jesus washing the disciples' feet (John 13:4-10).

== Lyrics ==
There is no one official version of the lyrics of this song, such as is the case with many traditional spirituals and folk songs in general whose authorship is unknown. Perhaps the best-known rendition of "Gospel Plow" is Bob Dylan's in 1962.

Another famous rendition of the song is under the name of "Keep Your Hand on the Plow" by gospel singer and civil rights activist Mahalia Jackson. The lyrics are slightly different:

Hold on
Hold on
Keep your hand on the plow, hold on

Hold on
Hold on
Keep your hand on the plow, hold on

Heard the voice of Jesus say
Come unto me, I am the way.
Keep your hand on the plow, hold on.

When my way gets dark as night,
I know the lord will be my light,
Keep your hand on the plow, hold on.

Hold on
Hold on
Keep your hand on the plow, hold on.

You can talk about me much as you please
The more you talk, gonna stay on my knees.
Keep your hand on the plow, hold on.

When I get to heaven, gonna sing and shout
Be nobody there to put me out.
Keep your hand on the plow, hold on.

I know my robe's gonna fit me well,
I tried it on at the gates of Hell.
Keep your hand on the plow, hold on.

Hold on
Hold on
Keep your hand on the plow, hold on

The structure of Jackson's rendition is interesting because it does not follow the traditional spiritual composition format of four-line stanzas in the AAAB or AABA rhyme scheme. Instead, it is composed in three-line stanzas that follow the AAB rhyme scheme which might be attributed to being a gospel adaptation of the traditional spiritual form of the song.

This song must have been an important one for Jackson, considering that the title of one of the chapters of her autobiography Movin' On Up is precisely "Keep your hand on the plow." In this chapter, she makes reference to pushing through during times of physical exhaustion after her tour through Europe.

== Recordings ==
- Hall Johnson Negro Choir - Keep Yo' Hand on the Plow, Hold On - 1930
- Duke Ellington at the 1958 Newport Jazz Festival
- The Folksmiths, including Joe Hickerson - We've Got Some Singing to Do 1958
- Odetta on Odetta at Carnegie Hall 1961
- Clara Ward and Her Singers 1962
- Bob Dylan on his self-titled debut album 1962
- Peggy Lee - 2 Shows Nightly 1968
- Noel Pointer - Hold On 1978
- Screaming Trees - Dust 1996
- Old Crow Medicine Show - Greetings from WAWA - 2000
- The Hackensaw Boys - Look Out - 2007
- Charlie Parr - Keep Your Hands on the Plow - 2011
- Uncle Sinner - Ballads and Mental Breakdowns - 2008
- Elizabeth Cook - Gospel Plow - 2012
- Moses Hogan - The Moses Hogan Choral Series 2003: This Little Light of Mine
- Slim Cessna's Auto Club - Always Say Please & Thank You (2000)
- Robert Plant - Saving Grace - 2025

== See also ==
- Keep Your Eyes on the Prize
