= K. C. Douglas =

American musician (1913–1975)

Background information
- Born: November 21, 1913; Sharon, Mississippi, U.S.
- Died: October 18, 1975 (aged 61) Berkeley, California, U.S.
- Genres: Blues
- Instruments: Guitar; vocals
- Years active: 1940–1975

K. C. Douglas (November 21, 1913 – October 18, 1975) was an American rural blues singer and guitarist.

== Career ==
Douglas was born in Sharon, Mississippi. His full given name was simply "K. C."; the letters were not initials. Douglas moved to Vallejo, California in 1945 to work in the naval shipyards, and by 1947 was playing on the San Francisco/Oakland blues scene. Douglas was influenced by Tommy Johnson, who he had worked with in the Jackson, Mississippi area in the early 1940s, and whose "Canned Heat Blues" he adapted on his albums, A Dead Beat Guitar and the Mississippi Blues and Big Road Blues.

The K. C. Douglas Trio's first recording was "Mercury Boogie" (later renamed "Mercury Blues"), in 1948. The other credited musicians were Sidney Maiden (harmonica), Ford Chaney (second guitar), and Otis Cherry (drums). The song has been covered by Steve Miller, David Lindley, Ry Cooder and Dwight Yoakam, and a 1992 version by Alan Jackson was a number two hit on the US country chart. Meat Loaf also covered the song as a bonus hidden track that appears on his 2003 album Couldn't Have Said It Better. The Ford Motor Company purchased rights to the song and used it in a TV commercial.

In the early 1960s Douglas recorded for Chris Strachwitz, mostly released on Strachwitz's Arhoolie Records and the Prestige Bluesville label. In 1961, Douglas played guitar on Sidney Maiden's album, Trouble An' Blues, thus reuniting a partnership that had started in the 1940s.

Douglas played at the San Francisco Blues Festival in 1973 and 1974. He formed a quartet that performed in the East Bay/Modesto/Stockton area.

Douglas died of a heart attack in Berkeley, California in October 1975, and was buried in the Pleasant Green Cemetery in Sharon, Mississippi.

== Influence ==
While in his thirties and working at a garage, Douglas taught blues guitar to Steve Wold, now performing as Seasick Steve, the grandson of his employer.

== Selected discography ==
=== Singles ===
Year	Title	Label
1948	"Mercury Boogie"	Down Town
1954	"Lonely Blues"	Rhythm

Note: the B-side of "Mercury Boogie" was by Sidney Maiden.

=== Albums ===
Year	Title	Label
1956	A Dead Beat Guitar and the Mississippi Blues	Cook/Smithsonian Folkways
1961	K. C.'s Blues	Bluesville
1961	Big Road Blues	Arhoolie
1974	The Country Boy (reissued as Mercury Blues with additional recordings)	Arhoolie
2006	Classic African-American Ballads	Smithsonian Folkways
