= Down Home Blues (Brownie McGhee and Sonny Terry album) =

Studio album by Brownie McGhee and Sonny Terry
- Released: 1960
- Recorded: August 22, 1960
- Studios: Van Gelder, Englewood Cliffs, NJ
- Genre: Blues
- Length: 38:57
- Labels: Bluesville; BVLP 1002
- Producer: The Sound of America Inc.

Brownie McGhee and Sonny Terry chronology
Brownie & Sonny Sing & Play (1960)	Down Home Blues (1960)	Blues & Folk (1960)

Down Home Blues is an album by blues musicians Brownie McGhee and Sonny Terry, recorded in 1960 and released on the Bluesville label. It was re-released in 1973 with Blues in My Soul as Back to New Orleans (Fantasy).

== Reception ==
Professional ratings
Review scores
Source	Rating
AllMusic	4.5/5 stars

AllMusic reviewer Bruce Eder stated that "the music itself stands outside of time. McGhee's strumming and singing have enough polish to pass as a commercial recording, but at its best, it's still sufficiently unaffected so as to be regarded as authentic country-blues. It's Terry's harp, however, that really pulls this body of music back to its roots ... the dominant elements of this album are the charm and honesty that Terry and McGhee offer, whatever their particular style on a specific song; they had portions of both to spare by the bucketload, which accounts for the 15 years that they held audiences in their spell".

== Track listing ==
All compositions by Brownie McGhee except where noted

1. "Let Me Be Your Big Dog" – 3:16
2. "Pawn Shop" – 3:29
3. "You Dont Know" – 2:51
4. "Betty and Dupree's Blues" – 6:18
5. "Back to New Orleans" (Brownie McGhee, Sonny Terry) – 3:00
6. "Stranger Here" (McGhee, Terry) – 3:37
7. "Fox Hunt" (McGhee, Terry) – 2:33
8. "I'm Prison Bound" – 3:04
9. "Louise, Louise" – 4:00
10. "Baby, How Long" – 4:14
11. "Freight Train" (McGhee, Terry) – 2:35

== Personnel ==
- Sonny Terry – harmonica, vocals
- Brownie McGhee – guitar, vocals
- Rudy Van Gelder – engineer
