= J. Allen Adams =

American politician and lawyer

- Born: Joseph Allen Adams; January 15, 1932; Greensboro, North Carolina
- Died: March 24, 2017 (aged 85); Raleigh, North Carolina
- Education: Boston University; University of North Carolina at Chapel Hill
- Occupations: Politician, lawyer

Joseph Allen "Al" Adams (January 15, 1932 – March 24, 2017) was an American politician and lawyer.

Born in Greensboro, North Carolina, Adams went to Phillips Exeter Academy between 1945 and 1948 and Cambridge Rindge and Latin School in 1948. Adams went to Boston University in 1948 and 1949 and then to University of North Carolina at Chapel Hill. He received his law degree from University of North Carolina at Chapel hill and was admitted to the North Carolina bar in 1954. Adams served in the United States Navy. He practiced law in Charlotte, North Carolina. Adams served in the North Carolina House of Representatives and was a Democrat.
