= The Titanic (song) =

Song
- Written: 1915 or 1916
- Published: 1927
- Genre: American folk music
- Songwriters: William and Versey Smith

"The Titanic" (also known as "It Was Sad When That Great Ship Went Down" and "Titanic (Husbands and Wives)") is a folk song. "The Titanic" is about the sinking of RMS Titanic which sank on April 15, 1912, after striking an iceberg.

== Background ==
=== History ===
The first folk songs about the Titanic disaster appeared within weeks after the disaster. Recordings of various songs about the disaster date to as early as 1913.

=== Variants ===
The canonical version of the song has the chorus:

It was sad when that great ship went down
Husbands and wives and little children lost their lives
It was sad when that great ship went down

In most variants, although not the earliest, the chorus starts with a line "it was sad, so sad, it was sad", and in many versions, the line "to the bottom of the..." appended after the repeat of "went down." Other than the chorus, different versions may contain verses in different order.

There are several regional variations on the song. According to Newman I. White's 1928 book American Negro Folk-Songs, "The Titanic" has been traced back to 1915 or 1916 in Hackleburg, Alabama. Other versions from around 1920 are documented in the Frank C. Brown Collection at Duke University in North Carolina. Early recordings include Ernest Stoneman's "The Titanic" (Okeh 40288) in September 1924 and William and Versey Smith's "When That Great Ship Went Down" in August 1927.

According to Jeff Place, in his notes for the Anthology of American Folk Music: "African-American musicians, in particular, found it noteworthy and ironic that company policies had kept Blacks from the doomed ship; the sinking was also attributed by some to divine retribution."

== Recordings ==
- Mance Lipscomb on Texas Songster Volume 2 (You Got to Reap What You Sow) 1964

== Works cited ==
- Habing, B. (September 28, 2008). "The Great Titanic - American Folk Song(romantic song)". Poem of the Week.
- Perkins, A.E. (1922). "Negro Spirituals from the Far South". Journal of American Folk-Lore. 35, 223.
- Levang, Rex (January 1999). "It Was Sad When the Great Ship Went Down". Minnesota Public Radio.
- White, Newman I. (1928). American Negro Folk-Songs. Harvard University Press.
