= Blues Hoot =

Live album by Lightnin' Hopkins, Brownie McGhee and Sonny Terry
- Released: 1963
- Recorded: August 1961
- Venue: Ash Grove, Los Angeles, CA
- Genre: Blues
- Length: 36:24
- Label: Horizon; WP/SWP-1617
- Producer: David Hubert

Lightnin' Hopkins chronology
| Blues in My Bottle (1961) | Blues Hoot (1963) | Lightnin' Sam Hopkins (1962) |

Blues Hoot (also released as Coffee House Blues) is a live album by blues musicians Lightnin' Hopkins, Brownie McGhee, and Sonny Terry recorded at the Ash Grove in Los Angeles in 1961 and originally released on the Davon label before being reissued by Horizon Records in 1963 and Vee-Jay Records in 1965.

== Reception ==
Professional ratings
Review scores
| Source | Rating |
|---|---|
| AllMusic | 3/5 stars |

AllMusic reviewer Bruce Eder stated: "Lightnin' Hopkins is the star of this live recording ... The sound is excellent, the performances are spirited enough ... It is difficult to say, however, anything distinguishes this set from the other folk club recordings that Hopkins, Terry and McGhee left behind on other labels".

== Track listing ==
All compositions by Sam "Lightnin'" Hopkins except where noted

1. Introduction – 1:45
2. "Big Car Blues" – 3:03
3. "Coffee House Blues" – 2:01
4. "Stool Pigeon Blues" – 3:04
5. "Ball of Twine" – 2:52
6. "Blues for Gamblers" (Traditional) – 6:42
7. "Walk On" (Brownie McGhee, Ruth McGhee) – 2:50
8. "Blues for Lowlands" (Brownie McGhee, Sonny Terry) – 4:50
9. "Down by the Riverside" (Traditional) – 3:17
10. "Blowin' the Fuses" (McGhee, Terry) – 5:55
11. "Right On That Shore" (Traditional) – 2:50

== Personnel ==
=== Performance ===
- Lightnin' Hopkins – guitar, vocals (tracks 1–6 & 11)
- Brownie McGhee – guitar, vocals (tracks 7–11)
- Sonny Terry – harmonica, vocals (tracks 7–11)
- Big Joe Williams – guitar, vocals (track 6)
