= J. T. Adams =

American musician

J. T. Adams (July 17, 1926 – September 1993) was an American gospel singer, musician, record label founder and dramatist, the creator of Worthy is the Lamb.

He was born James Taylor Adams in Sulphur Springs, Texas, United States. He served in the army in the latter part of World War II and then attended East Texas State University, where he graduated and later taught music. He earned music degrees from Texas Christian University and East Texas State University. In 1952, he formed a singing group, The Men of Texas, which performed and recorded on several record labels for about 15 years. In 1966, he founded Carol Records. The Men of Texas were "a male glee club made up of outstanding voices from every section of the state." Adams was also director of music and youth at the Beverly Hills Baptist Church in Oak Cliff, Texas, and the First Baptist Church of Sulphur Springs.

== Worthy is the Lamb ==
Worthy is the Lamb is a 1988 outdoor drama which portrays the life, death and resurrection of Christ. It was written by Adams and was shown nightly at the Crystal Coast Amphitheatre, in Swansboro, North Carolina. It shut down in 2002.
