= Brownie McGhee =

American folk-blues musician (1915–1996)

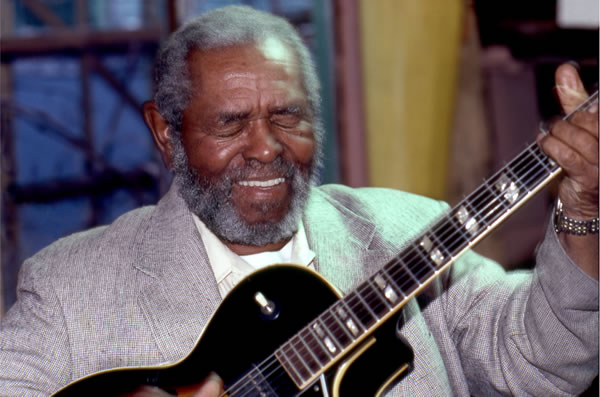
- McGhee in 1982

Background information
- Born: Walter Brown McGhee; November 30, 1915; Knoxville, Tennessee, U.S.
- Died: February 16, 1996 (aged 80) Oakland, California, U.S.
- Genres: Folk-blues; country blues; Piedmont blues; East Coast blues; blues revival
- Occupation: Musician
- Instruments: Guitar; vocals; piano; kazoo
- Years active: 1930s–1995

Walter Brown "Brownie" McGhee (November 30, 1915 – February 16, 1996) was an American folk and Piedmont blues singer and guitarist, best known for his collaboration with the harmonica player Sonny Terry.

== Life and career ==
McGhee was born in Knoxville, Tennessee, and grew up in Kingsport, Tennessee. At about the age of four he contracted polio, which severely limited use of his right leg. His brother Granville "Stick" McGhee, who also later became a musician and composed the song "Drinkin' Wine Spo-Dee-O-Dee", was nicknamed for pushing young Brownie around in a cart. Their father, George McGhee, was a factory worker, known around University Avenue for playing guitar and singing. Brownie's uncle made him a guitar from a tin marshmallow box and a piece of board.

McGhee spent much of his youth immersed in music, singing with a local harmony group, the Golden Voices Gospel Quartet, and teaching himself to play guitar. He also played the five-string banjo and ukulele and studied piano. Surgery funded by the March of Dimes enabled McGhee to walk.

At the age of 22, McGhee became a traveling musician, working in the Rabbit Foot Minstrels and befriending Blind Boy Fuller, whose guitar playing influenced him greatly. After Fuller's death in 1941, J. B. Long of Columbia Records promoted McGhee as "Blind Boy Fuller No. 2". By that time, McGhee was recording for Columbia's subsidiary Okeh Records in Chicago, but his real success came after he moved to New York in 1942, when he teamed up with Sonny Terry, whom he had known since 1939, when Terry was Fuller's harmonica player. The pairing was an overnight success. They recorded and toured together until around 1980. As a duo, Terry and McGhee did most of their work from 1958 until 1980, spending 11 months of each year touring and recording dozens of albums.

Despite their later fame as "pure" folk artists playing for white audiences, in the 1940s Terry and McGhee had attempted to be successful recording artists, fronting a jump blues combo with honking saxophone and rolling piano, variously calling themselves "Brownie McGhee and his Jook House Rockers" or "Sonny Terry and his Buckshot Five", often with Champion Jack Dupree and Big Chief Ellis. They also appeared in the original Broadway productions of Finian's Rainbow and Cat on a Hot Tin Roof.

During the blues revival of the 1960s, Terry and McGhee were popular on the concert and music festival circuits, occasionally adding new material but usually remaining faithful to their roots and playing to the tastes of their audiences.

Late in his life, McGhee appeared in small roles in films and on television. He and Terry appeared in the 1979 Steve Martin comedy The Jerk. In 1987, McGhee gave a small but memorable performance as the ill-fated blues singer Toots Sweet in the supernatural thriller movie Angel Heart. In his review of Angel Heart, the critic Roger Ebert singled out McGhee for praise, declaring that he delivered a "performance that proves [saxophonist] Dexter Gordon isn't the only old musician who can act." McGhee appeared in the television series Family Ties, in a 1988 episode entitled "The Blues, Brother", in which he played the fictional blues musician Eddie Dupre. He also appeared in the television series Matlock, in a 1989 episode entitled "The Blues Singer", providing the singing voice and guitar playing for Joe Seneca's character who is accused of murder. In the episode, McGhee, Seneca and star Andy Griffith perform a version of "The Midnight Special".

Happy Traum, a former guitar student of McGhee's, edited a blues guitar instruction guide and songbook, Guitar Styles of Brownie McGhee, published in 1971, in which McGhee, between lessons, talked about his life and the blues. The autobiographical section features McGhee talking about growing up, his musical beginnings, and a history of the blues from the 1930s onward.

McGhee and Terry were both recipients of a 1982 National Heritage Fellowship awarded by the National Endowment for the Arts, which is the United States government's highest honor in the folk and traditional arts. That year's fellowships were the first bestowed by the NEA.

One of McGhee's last concert appearances was at the 1995 Chicago Blues Festival.

He died of stomach cancer on February 16, 1996, in Oakland, California, at the age of 80.

McGhee was portrayed by Joshua Henry in the 2024 film A Complete Unknown.

== Discography ==
=== Solo albums ===
- Traditional Blues, Vol. 1 (Folkways Records, 1951)
- Brownie McGhee Blues (Folkways, 1955)
- Brownie McGhee Sings the Blues (Folkways, 1959)
- Traditional Blues, Vol. 2 (Folkways, 1960)
- Brownie's Blues (Bluesville, 1962)
- Blues Is Truth (Blues Alliance, 1976)
- Facts of Life (Blues Rock'It, 1985) with the Ford Blues Band

=== Compilation ===
- The Folkways Years, 1945–1959 (Smithsonian Folkways, 1991)

=== With Sonny Terry ===
- Brownie McGhee Blues (Folkways, 1955)
- Washboard Band: Country Dance Music (Folkways, 1956)
- Folk Songs of Sonny Terry and Brownie McGhee (Roulette, 1958)
- Blues with Big Bill Broonzy, Sonny Terry and Brownie McGhee (Folkways, 1959)
- Down South Summit Meetin' (World Pacific, 1960), with Lightnin' Hopkins and Big Joe Williams
- Down Home Blues (Bluesville, 1960)
- Blues Hoot (Horizon, 1961 [1963]), with Lightnin' Hopkins and Big Joe Williams
- Brownie McGhee & Sonny Terry at the 2nd Fret (Prestige, 1962)
- Sonny Is King (Bluesville, 1963)
- A Long Way from Home (BluesWay, 1969)
- I Couldn't Believe My Eyes (BluesWay, 1969 [1973])
- Sonny & Brownie (A&M Records, 1973)
- Brownie McGhee and Sonny Terry Sing (Smithsonian Folkways, 1990)
- Back Country Blues (Southern Routes, 2016)

=== Other ===
- Songs for Victory: Music for Political Action, with the Union Boys (1944)

== See also ==
- American folk music
- Woody Guthrie
- List of blues musicians
- List of folk musicians
- List of people from Tennessee
- Union Boys
