= Sonny Terry =

American blues harmonica player and vocalist (1911–1986)

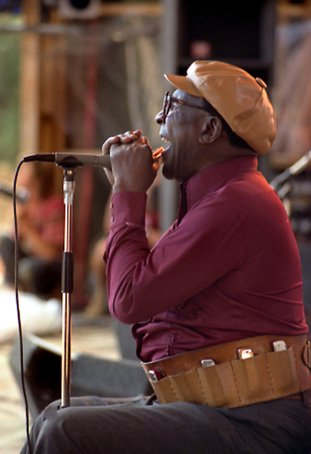
- Terry performing at Nambassa in 1981

Background information
- Born: Saunders Terrell; October 24, 1911; Greensboro, Georgia, U.S.
- Origin: Shelby, North Carolina, U.S.
- Died: March 11, 1986 (aged 74) Mineola, New York, U.S.
- Genres: Piedmont blues; country blues; blues revival; folk-blues; East Coast blues
- Occupation: Musician
- Instruments: Harmonica; vocals; jaw harp
- Years active: 1930s–1980s
- Labels: Atlantic; ABC

Saunders Terrell (October 24, 1911 – March 11, 1986), known as Sonny Terry, was an American Piedmont blues and folk musician, who was known for his energetic blues harmonica style, which frequently included vocal whoops and hollers and occasionally imitations of trains and fox hunts.

== Early life ==
Terry was born in Greensboro, Georgia. His father, a farmer, taught him to play basic blues harp as a youth. He sustained injuries to his eyes and went blind by the time he was 16, which prevented him from doing farm work, and was forced to play music in order to earn a living. Terry played "Camptown Races" to the plow horses which improved the efficiency of farming in the area. He began playing blues in Shelby, North Carolina.

== Career ==
After his father died, he began playing with Piedmont blues–style guitarist Blind Boy Fuller. When Fuller died in 1941, Terry established a long-standing musical relationship with Brownie McGhee, and they recorded numerous songs together. The duo became well known among white audiences during the folk music revival of the 1950s and 1960s, including for collaborations with Styve Homnick, Woody Guthrie and Moses Asch, producing classic recordings for Folkways Records (now Smithsonian/Folkways).

In 1938, Terry was invited to play at Carnegie Hall for the first From Spirituals to Swing concert, and later that year he recorded for the Library of Congress. He recorded his first commercial sides in 1940. Among his most famous works are "Old Jabo", a song about a man bitten by a snake, and "Lost John", which demonstrates Terry's precisely honed breath control.

Despite their fame as "pure" folk artists, in the 1940s Terry and McGhee fronted a jump blues combo with honking saxophone and rolling piano, which was variously billed as "Brownie McGhee and his Jook House Rockers" or "Sonny Terry and his Buckshot Five".

Terry was in the 1947 original cast of the Broadway musical comedy Finian's Rainbow. With McGhee, he appeared in the 1979 Steve Martin comedy The Jerk. Terry also appeared in the 1985 film The Color Purple, directed by Steven Spielberg. Terry collaborated with Ry Cooder on "Walkin' Away Blues", and also performed a cover of Robert Johnson's "Crossroad Blues" for the 1986 film Crossroads.

Terry and McGhee were both recipients of a 1982 National Heritage Fellowship awarded by the National Endowment for the Arts, which is the United States government's highest honor in the folk and traditional arts. That year's fellowships were the first bestowed by the NEA.

== Death ==
Terry died of natural causes in Mineola, New York, in March 1986, three days before Crossroads was released in theaters. He was inducted into the Blues Hall of Fame in the same year.

== Discography ==
- Songs for Victory: Music for Political Action, with the Union Boys (1944)
- Get on Board [with Brownie McGhee] (Folkways, 1952)
- Sonny Terry's Washboard Band (Folkways, 1955)
- Pete Seeger and Sonny Terry (Folkways, 1957)
- Folk Songs of Sonny Terry and Brownie McGhee (Roulette, 1958)
- Sonny Terry & Brownie McGhee (Fantasy 3254, 1958)
- Blues with Big Bill Broonzy, Sonny Terry and Brownie McGhee (Folkways, 1959)
- Down South Summit Meetin' (World Pacific, 1960), with Brownie McGhee, Lightnin' Hopkins and Big Joe Williams
- Down Home Blues (Bluesville, 1960), with Brownie McGhee
- Blues in My Soul (Brownie McGhee and Sonny Terry album) (Bluesville 1033, September 1960)
- Brownie's Blues (Bluesville, 1960), with Brownie McGhee
- Sonny's Story (Bluesville, 1960)
- Sonny Terry's New Sound: The Jawharp in Blues and Folk Music, with Brownie McGhee & J. C. Burris (1961)
- Last Night Blues (Bluesville, 1960 [1961]), with Lightnin' Hopkins
- Sonny Is King (Bluesville, 1960/62 [1963]), with Lightnin' Hopkins and Big Joe Williams
- Blues Hoot (Horizon, 1961 [1963])
- Sonny Terry and His Mouth Harp (Stinson, 1963 [1963])
- Chain Gang Special (Everest FS-206 1965?)
- Brownie McGhee, Sonny Terry at The Bunkhouse (Smash, 1965)
- Sing & Play (Society, 1966)
- A Long Way from Home (BluesWay, 1969)
- I Couldn't Believe My Eyes (BluesWay, 1969 [1973])
- Sonny & Brownie (A&M Records, 1973)
- Back to New Orleans (Fantasy, 1973) -- album is a re-release of Down Home Blues and Blues in My Soul
- Robbin' the Grave (Blue Labor, 1974)
- Whoopin', with Johnny Winter and Willie Dixon (Alligator, 1984)
- Brownie McGhee and Sonny Terry Sing (Smithsonian Folkways, 1990)
- Whoopin' the Blues: The Capitol Recordings, 1947–1950 (Capitol, 1995)

== See also ==
- American folk music
- Blind musicians
- Harmonica
- Jaw harp
- List of blues musicians
- List of harmonicists
- List of people on stamps of the United States
- Union Boys
