= List of Texas blues musicians =

Texas Blues is a subgenre of the blues, and of course is not limited to Texas-based musicians. It has had various style variations but typically has been played with more swing than other blues styles. Texas blues differs from styles such as Chicago blues in use of instruments and sounds, especially the heavy use of the guitar. Musicians such as Stevie Ray Vaughan contributed by using various types of guitar sounds like southern slide guitar and different melodies of blues and jazz. Texas blues also relies on guitar solos or "licks" as bridges in songs. Below is a list of Texas blues musicians.

== A ==
- Alger "Texas" Alexander – (September 12, 1900 – April 16, 1954) Born in Jewett, Texas, Alexander was a country blues singer who was one of the original forebears of Texas blues music. He never did learn to play guitar, though he was backed by such artists as Lonnie Johnson and Lightnin' Hopkins. He also did singing gigs for King Oliver. Over his impressive career, he recorded for Okeh Records and Freedom Records, among others.

== B ==
- Lou Ann Barton – (born February 17, 1954) Born in Austin, Texas, Barton is a blues-rock and Texas blues singer who has performed with artists like Stevie Ray Vaughan and The Fabulous Thunderbirds. She has released at least seven albums starting in the 1980s for labels like Discovery Records and Catfish Records.
- Black Boy Shine (c. September 12, 1908 – March 28, 1952) Born in Fort Bend County, Texas, United States, he was a pianist, singer and songwriter. Little is known of his life outside of his recording career. He was part of the "Santa Fe Group", a loose ensemble of black blues pianists who played in the many juke joints abutting the Atchison, Topeka and Santa Fe Railway. Black Boy Shine recorded almost twenty tracks between 1936 and 1937 for Vocalion and Melotone Records.
- Black Ivory King – (November 25, 1899 – November 17, 1947) Born in Stamps, Arkansas, he was another "Santa Fe Group" pianist and singer. He recorded four tracks for Decca Records in 1937.
- Zuzu Bollin – (September 5, 1922 – October 2, 1990) Born in Frisco, Texas, he recorded "Why Don't You Eat Where You Slept Last Night," "Headlight Blues" and "Stavin' Chain" / "Cry, Cry, Cry".
- Juke Boy Bonner – (March 22, 1932 – June 29, 1978) Born in Bellville, Texas, as Weldon Bonner, Bonner was a Texas blues and West Coast blues guitarist and blues harp player as well as a vocalist. Though based primarily in Texas for most of his career, he did work in the 1950s in Oakland, California, and recorded there for Irma Records. Like so many of the early blues musicians, Bonner was forced to work in a meat processing plant in his later career just to make ends meet. He performed in both acoustic and electric blues environments.
- Andy Boy – (November 10, 1904 – unknown) Born in Galveston, Texas, Boy was a pianist and songwriter. He was part of the "Santa Fe Group".
- Doyle Bramhall – (February 17, 1949 – November 12, 2011) Born in Dallas, Texas, Bramhall is strictly a Texas blues musician, a guitarist, drummer and singer who worked with Stevie Ray Vaughan and his brother Jimmie Vaughan. His son, Doyle Bramhall II is also a blues musician. He has released several solo albums.
- Clarence "Gatemouth" Brown – (April 18, 1924 – September 10, 2005) Born in Vinton, Louisiana, Brown was one of the regulars of the Texas blues scene. A multi-instrumentalist, he performed on guitar, harmonica, mandolin, bass guitar, violin and sang. Brown was the first artist to record for Peacock Records, and his style of play was influential on burgeoning talent in Texas. Later in his career he moved more away from acoustic modes of play in favor of electric blues, often fusing in his sound elements of calypso and zydeco.
- Pinetop Burks – (August 7, 1907 – January 11, 1947) Born near Richmond, Texas, Burks was a pianist and songwriter. He was part of the "Santa Fe Group".

== C ==
- Ezra Charles – (born June 17, 1944) Born in Texarkana, Texas, as Charles Helpinstill. Singer, pianist, songwriter, bandleader from Houston. He had his start performing with Johnny Winter and Edgar Winter in Beaumont. Leader of Thursday's Children, seminal rock band from Houston in the 1960s. Invented the Helpinstill Piano Pickup in 1972. Led Ezra Charles and the Works band from 1983–present, now called Ezra Charles' Texas Blues Band.
- Gary Clark, Jr. – (born February 15, 1984) is a musician from Austin, Texas. In 2020, he won the Grammy Award for "Best Rock Song" and "Best Rock Performance" for the song "This Land" from his album of the same name.
- W. C. Clark – November 16, 1939 – March 2, 2024) Born in Austin, Texas, Clark was one of the originators of blues in the city of Austin. A soul music singer and electric Texas blues guitarist, he had his start performing with T.D. Bell. He also can be seen performing onstage with Stevie Ray Vaughan for a 1980s episode of Austin City Limits. Following a tragic car wreck in 1997 that resulted in the death of his fiance and drummer, Clark has slowed down on touring and recording.
- Arnett Cobb – (August 10, 1918 – March 24, 1989) Born in Houston, Texas, Cobb is most remembered as a jazz tenor saxophonist, though his contributions to Texas blues and other sounds like New York blues and jump blues should not be taken lightly. He is the person who discovered James Brown and, in his later years, he led his own band called Texas Jazz and Blues.
- Albert Collins – (October 1, 1932 – November 24, 1993) Born in Leona, Texas, Collins was one of the true greats of the Texas blues scene. An original songwriter, as well as an accomplished guitarist and singer, Collins performed with some of the best musicians the state of Texas had to offer. He released many recordings over his career, and enjoyed renewed appreciation for his art during the blues revival of the 1960s.
- Rob Cooper was a pianist and songwriter. He was part of the "Santa Fe Group". In 1934, he was the first of that "Santa Fe Group" to record, and is best known as one of Joe Pullum's piano accompanists. Cooper played on a number of tracks between 1934 and 1936, for recordings issued by Bluebird and Victor.
- Johnny Copeland – (March 27, 1937 – June 3, 1997) Born in Haynesville, Louisiana, Copeland was both an acoustic and electric Texas blues guitarist and vocalist who only enjoyed real success late in his career during the 1990s. He recorded numerous solo albums, many for Rounder Records.
- Pee Wee Crayton – (December 18, 1914 – June 25, 1985) Born in Rockdale, Texas, Crayton was a frequent member of the Texas blues scene. Both an acoustic and electric blues guitarist and singer, he also performed rhythm and blues and West Coast blues when moving to Los Angeles, California in 1935. He recorded at least nine albums over his career, in addition to collaborations with other artists. Among the labels he worked for were Crown Records and Charly Records, among others.

== D ==
- James "Thunderbird" Davis – (November 10, 1938 – January 24, 1992) Born in Prichard, Alabama, United States, Davis recorded several singles for Duke Records in the early 1960s, enjoying moderate success with "Blue Monday" (1963). Dropping from public attention, his career was revived in 1989 with the release of his album, Check Out Time.
- Larry Davis – (December 4, 1936 – April 19, 1994) Born in Kansas City, Missouri, but raised in Little Rock, Arkansas, Davis was an acoustic and electric Texas blues and soul blues musician who was greatly influenced by Albert King. He recorded often with Fenton Robinson. He released albums for many labels, including Bullseye Blues, Duke Records, and many others.
- Chris Duarte – (born February 16, 1963) Born in San Antonio, Texas, Duarte is a guitarist, singer, and songwriter. Duarte plays a style of Texas blues-rock that draws on elements of jazz, blues, and rock and roll.
- Omar Kent Dykes – (born Kent Dykes, 1950, McComb, Mississippi, United States) Dykes is a blues guitarist and singer, living in Austin, Texas.

== E ==
- Robert Ealey – (December 6, 1925 – March 8, 2001) Born in Texarkana, Texas, he was a singer. Among other releases, he recorded a couple of albums for Black Top Records in the 1990s, having earlier formed a duo with U.P. Wilson.

== F ==
- The Fabulous Thunderbirds – Formed in 1974 in Austin, Texas, by Jimmie Vaughan and others, this group played the gamut of music. They perform blues-rock, Texas blues and rock and roll. Vaughan left the group in 1990.
- Guy Forsyth – (born November 30, 1968). Born in Denver, Colorado, Forsyth is a guitarist, singer, harmonica player, interpreter and songwriter. He was a member of Asylum Street Spankers and has released 12 albums to date.
- Denny Freeman – (August 7, 1944 – April 25, 2021). Born in Orlando, Florida, Freeman was a Texas blues electric guitarist, pianist and organist. He collaborated with both Vaughan Brothers, playing on Jimmie Vaughan's Strange Pleasure and played with Stevie Ray Vaughan in The Cobras. He also played with Lou Ann Barton, Taj Mahal and the Phantom Blues Band.
- Lowell Fulson – (March 31, 1921 – March 6, 1999). Born in Tulsa, Oklahoma, Fulson was an innovator who performed guitar and sang in a variety of blues-based genres, particularly soul-blues, electric Texas blues and West Coast blues, as well as urban blues. He performed with musicians like Alger "Texas" Alexander, and also had a long recording career releasing many solo albums.
- Anson Funderburgh – (born November 14, 1954). Born in Plano, Texas, Funderburgh is a guitarist and has been the bandleader of Anson Funderburgh and the Rockets since 1978.

== G ==
- Grady Gaines – (May 14, 1934 – January 29, 2021) Born in Waskom, Texas, Gaines is an electric Texas blues and jazz blues tenor saxophonist who recorded with Little Richard in the 1950s. He also backed other musicians such as Clarence Hollimon, Joe Medwick and James Brown. He released a few records for Black Top Records.
- Roy Gaines – (August 12, 1937 – August 11, 2021) Born in Waskom, Texas, Gaines was a protege of T-Bone Walker, he regularly played clubs throughout the Houston area before relocating to Los Angeles. He joined Roy Milton's band, followed by supporting Chuck Willis. His debut album, Gaineling (1982) was followed several others.
- Billy Gibbons – Guitarist for ZZ Top and solo performer.
- Diunna Greenleaf – (born October 6, 1957) Born in Houston, Texas, Greenleaf has issued four albums to date and, at the 2014 Blues Music Awards, she won the Koko Taylor Award.

== H ==
- Harmonica Slim – (December 21, 1934 – June 16, 1984), was an American blues harmonicist, singer and songwriter.
- Andrew "Smokey" Hogg – (January 27, 1914 – May 1, 1960) Born in Westconnie, Texas, Hogg began his career as a rhythm and blues musician. An acoustic and electric guitarist, singer and pianist, Hogg performed with musicians in Texas like Black Ace.
- Lightnin' Hopkins – (March 15, 1912 – January 30, 1982) Born Sam Hopkins in Centerville, Texas, Hopkins was an acoustic and electric guitarist and a major exponent of Texas blues. During his late career he performed mostly on electric guitar, though in the same manner that he would perform on an acoustic one. Like John Lee Hooker, Hopkins is one of the better known blues musicians of history.
- Joe "Guitar" Hughes – (September 29, 1937 – May 20, 2003) Born in Houston, Texas. One of the unsung heroes of the Texas blues scene, Hughes was an acoustic and electric guitarist and vocalist. He performed with Bobby "Blue" Bland in the 1960s and released a series of solo albums in the late 1980s and 1990s, for labels including Black Top Records and Double Trouble Records.
- Long John Hunter – (July 13, 1931 – January 4, 2016), he released three albums on Alligator Records in the 1990s. His final release, Looking for a Party, was issued by Blue Express in October 2009.
- Alan Haynes (born February 19, 1956) Born in Houston, Texas, Haynes is a guitarist.
- Rocky Hill (December 1, 1946 – April 10, 2009), and brother of ZZ Top bassist Dusty Hill, was a blues guitarist, singer, and bassist from Dallas, Texas.

== J ==
- Melvin Jackson – (August 16, 1915 – May 30, 1976) Born in Tyler, Texas, Jackson was a regular of the Texas blues scene, an acoustic and electric country blues guitarist and singer who seemed most comfortable performing acoustic. He cut a few records for Arhoolie Records over the years.
- Blind Lemon Jefferson – (September 24, 1893 – Mid-December 1929) Born in Coutchman, Texas. One of the most widely recorded and influential blues guitarists and singers of the pre-war Country blues era, Jefferson's influence extended to artists in other geographic areas and subgenres such as Delta blues and Piedmont blues.
- Blind Willie Johnson – (January 22, 1897 – September 18, 1945) Born near Brenham, Texas, was first and foremost a gospel blues guitarist and singer, an early innovator of the slide guitar (using a pocketknife). Johnson mixed his evangelical lyrics with early Texas blues, and is remembered for the 30 songs he recorded for Columbia Records in 1927–30.
- Eric Johnson – (born August 17, 1954) Guitarist from Austin, Texas. His 1990 album Ah Via Musicom was certified platinum by the RIAA, and the single "Cliffs of Dover" won the Grammy Award for Best Rock Instrumental Performance.
- Andrew "Jr. Boy" Jones – (born October 16, 1948) Born in Dallas, Texas, Jones is a guitarist, singer and songwriter, whose recorded work has been released on five albums. In 1995, he was also part of the ensemble that garnered a Blues Music Award as the 'Band of the Year'.
- Tutu Jones – (born September 9, 1966) Born in Dallas, Texas), is an electric blues and soul blues guitarist, singer and songwriter, who has released five albums since 1994.
- Janis Joplin – (January 19, 1943 – October 4, 1970) Born in Port Arthur, Texas, was an American singer-songwriter who first rose to prominence in the late 1960s as the lead singer of the psychedelic-acid rock band Big Brother and the Holding Company, and later as a solo artist with her own backing groups, The Kozmic Blues Band and The Full Tilt Boogie Band.

== K ==
- Bnois King – (born January 21, 1943) Born in Delhi, Louisiana, King was the regular rhythm guitarist and vocalist for the Smokin' Joe Kubek band, and eventually full partner with Kubek, as well as supporting a solo career, especially as a composer, as of 2015.
- Freddie King – (September 3, 1934 – December 28, 1976) Born in Gilmer, Texas, King was an electric rhythm and blues and Texas blues guitarist who performed with a long list of blues musicians throughout his career. He recorded extensively in the 1960s for King Records.
- Bob Kirkpatrick – (born January 10, 1934). Born in Haynesville, Louisiana, he later settled in Dallas and has released three albums to date.
- Will Knaak – (born September 23, 1984) Born in Austin, Texas, he is the frontman of the bands Knaak Attack, and Will Knaak & The Voodoo Exorcists. Lead guitarist of Blue October.
- Smokin' Joe Kubek – (November 30, 1956 – October 11, 2015). Born in Grove City, Pennsylvania, but raised mostly in Texas, Kubek was an electric blues guitarist and vocalist in the Texas blues tradition. His band, "The Smokin' Joe Kubek Band", released their debut album in 1991 for Bullseye Blues entitled Steppin' Out Texas Style. He first had his start backing musicians like Freddie King and often partnered with Bnois King. Since their debut, Kubek released other albums with his band and some solo work.

== L ==
- Black Joe Lewis – (born Tucson, Arizona, United States). Lewis is a musician influenced by Howlin' Wolf and James Brown. He formed Black Joe Lewis and The Honeybears in Austin, Texas, in 2007. In March 2009, Esquire listed Black Joe Lewis and the Honeybears as one of the "Ten Bands Set to Break Out at 2009's SXSW Festival."
- Mance Lipscomb – (April 9, 1895 – January 30, 1976) Born in Navasota, Texas, Lipscomb's acoustic guitar style was characterized by the distinctive use of a mono-tonic bass note. He performed songs in a wide range of genres.
- Lance Lopez – (born September 30, 1977), born in Shreveport, Louisiana, United States, Lopez has lived in Texas most of his adult life. Jeff Beck has described Lopez as "a very exciting and intense blues guitarist".

== M ==
- Ida May Mack – (unknown – unknown) – Mack recorded eight songs in August 1928, six of which were issued by Victor at that time.
- Pete Mayes – (March 21, 1938 – December 16, 2008) Born in Double Bayou, singer, and songwriter, whose career spanned six decades.
- Luke "Long Gone" Miles – (May 8, 1925 – November 22, 1987) Miles was a Texas and electric blues singer and songwriter.
- Ian Moore – (born August 8, 1968, in Berkeley, California, United States) Moore is a guitarist and singer-songwriter from Austin, Texas.
- Mike Morgan – (born November 30, 1959) Morgan is bandleader of "Mike Morgan & the Crawl", a Texas blues band. He is a guitarist, and has released a series of albums for Black Top and Severn Records.

== N ==
- Darrell Nulisch – (born September 14, 1952, in Dallas). Nulisch, a singer and harmonica player, has worked with Anson Funderburgh and Ronnie Earl as well as issuing several solo albums.

== O ==
- Omar & the Howlers – Formed in the early 1980s in Austin, Texas, and led by guitarist Omar Kent Dykes, the group performs electric Texas blues, rock and roll and blues-rock. The band is especially popular in Europe. The group has released at least sixteen albums for labels including Columbia Records, Watermelon Records and Black Top Records. Dykes has also had a successful career as a solo artist.

== P ==
- Buster Pickens – (June 3, 1916 – November 24, 1964) Born Edwin Pickens in Hempstead, Texas, Pickens was an early Texas blues and piano blues pianist, who accompanied Alger "Texas" Alexander and Lightnin' Hopkins. Pickens was part of the "Santa Fe Group". He was shot dead in a bar room brawl in 1964.

== Q ==
- Henry Qualls (July 8, 1934 – December 7, 2003). American Texas and country blues guitarist and singer. He found success late in his life after being "discovered" in 1993 by the Dallas Blues Society. He released his only album in 1994 but toured globally playing at a number of festivals.

== R ==
- Fenton Robinson – (September 23, 1935 – November 25, 1997) Born in Minter City, Mississippi, Robinson performed everything from soul-blues and Texas blues to what he is most remembered for, the Chicago blues. He was discovered by Bobby "Blue" Bland, who soon got him recording for Duke Records. A guitarist and singer, Robinson played both acoustic and electric guitar. He appeared on "Texas Flood" by Larry Davis in 1958. In the 1960s, he moved to Chicago, where he later recorded extensively for Alligator Records.

== S ==
- Robert Shaw – (August 9, 1908 – May 18, 1985) Born in Stafford, Texas, Shaw was a blues and boogie-woogie pianist. He was part of the "Santa Fe Group".
- Frankie Lee Sims – (April 30, 1917 – May 10, 1970) Electric Texas blues guitarist.
- J. T. Smith – (c. 1890 – c. 1940), variously known as the Howling Wolf, "Funny Paper" Smith, "Funny Papa" Smith, and Howling Smith, was a blues guitarist, singer and songwriter. He released around ten singles in his own name or variants thereof, and recorded with Bernice Edwards, Black Boy Shine, Magnolia Harris, and Dessa Foster. His best known song was "Howling Wolf Blues", of which there were a number of variants recorded.
- Angela Strehli – (born November 22, 1945) Strehli is a singer-songwriter and Texas blues historian.

== T ==
- Henry Thomas - (1874 – 1930) Born in Big Sandy, Texas, Thomas’ ragtime style is considered one of the building blocks for what became Texas Blues.
- Ramblin' Thomas – (c. 1902 – c. 1945) Born in Logansport, Louisiana, he was the brother of another blues musician, Jesse Thomas. Thomas is best remembered for his slide guitar playing, and recording several pieces in the late 1920s and early 1930s. Blues scholars seem undecided if Thomas's nickname of Ramblin' was in reference to his style of playing, or itinerant nature.
- Big Mama Thornton – (December 11, 1926 – July 25, 1984) Born in Montgomery, Alabama, Thornton was the first to perform "Hound Dog". Born Willie Mae Thornton, she performed everything from rhythm and blues and West Coast blues to Juke Joint blues and Texas blues. Not only a singer, she also played harmonica and drums.
- Bessie Tucker – (c. 1906 – January 6, 1933) was a classic female blues, country blues, and Texas blues singer and songwriter. Little is known of her life outside the music industry. She is known to have recorded just twenty-four tracks, seven of which were alternate takes. Her songs include "Penitentiary" and "Fryin' Pan Skillet Blues".
- Babe Kyro Lemon Turner, aka "The Black Ace," aka "Buck" Turner – (December 21, 1905 – November 7, 1972) Born in Cass County, Texas, Turner was known for playing slide guitar in the "Texas style" (with the instrument placed flat on the lap), and recorded for Decca in the 1930s and also for Arhoolie in the 1960s.

== V ==
- Kathy Valentine – (born January 7, 1959). Born in Austin, Texas, Valentine is a rock and blues guitarist and songwriter.
- Jimmie Vaughan – (born March 20, 1951) Born in Dallas, Texas, guitarist and singer Vaughan is brother to Stevie Ray Vaughan. Aside from his work with his brother, he is also a former founding member of The Fabulous Thunderbirds along with Kim Wilson. Vaughan plays everything from Texas blues and blues-rock to soul-blues and roots rock. He has released at least three solo albums since 1995 for Epic Records and Artemis Records.
- Stevie Ray Vaughan – (October 3, 1954 – August 27, 1990) Born in Dallas, Texas, Vaughan was a major force on the Texas blues scene and a talented blues-rock guitarist and singer. He was leader of the band Stevie Ray Vaughan and Double Trouble, formerly known as Triple Threat. He recorded many albums for Epic Records, and was one of the more popular blues musicians of the modern era.

== W ==
- T-Bone Walker – (May 28, 1910 – March 16, 1975) Born in Linden, Texas, as Aaron Thibeaux Walker, T-Bone Walker is easily one of the most well known artists of Texas blues. An acoustic and electric guitarist, Walker recorded a slew of albums for record labels like Capitol Records, Imperial Records, Brunswick Records, and many others.
- Johnny "Guitar" Watson – (February 3, 1935 – May 17, 1996) Born in Houston, Texas, Watson had his beginnings performing Texas blues, a tradition he embraced until his death in 1996 while touring in Japan. He also performed rhythm and blues and funk music, and released well over twenty albums for various record labels.
- Lavelle White – (born July 3, 1929, in Amite City, Louisiana), White recorded for Duke Records in the 1950s and early 1960s, before issuing a comeback album in 1994 on Antone's Records.
- Buddy Whittington – (born December 28, 1956) Born in Fort Worth, Texas, he appeared on countless John Mayall shows and recordings for 15 years between 1993 and 2008.
- Lester Williams – (June 24, 1920 – November 13, 1990) Guitarist, singer and songwriter.
- Roosevelt Thomas "Grey Ghost" Williams – (December 7, 1903 – July 17, 1996) Texas blues pianist and singer who has few field recordings that have survived from his early years. He did record a self-titled album for Catfish Records in 1987.
- Hop Wilson – (April 27, 1927 – August 27, 1975) Born in Grapeland, Texas, Wilson was both an acoustic and electric Texas blues guitarist and singer (he also occasionally performed on blues harp). A slide guitar player, Wilson performed with a variety of musicians such as Ivory Semien and later recorded in the 1960s for Ivory Records.
- Kim Wilson – (born January 6, 1951) Born in Detroit, Michigan, Wilson is best known as the leader of The Fabulous Thunderbirds. A blues harp player and singer, Wilson performs Texas blues, blues-rock and harmonica blues. Starting in the 1990s, he began pursuing a solo career, out of which he has released at least five solo albums for labels such as Discovery Records.
- U.P. Wilson – (September 4, 1934 – September 22, 2004) Born in Caddo Parish, Shreveport, Louisiana, Wilson was an electric blues guitarist and singer who performed Texas blues. He recorded three albums for JSP Records, the first being Boogie Boy: Return of the Texas Tornado.
- Johnny Winter – (February 23, 1944 – July 16, 2014) Born in Beaumont, Texas, Winter was a popular attraction on the Texas blues circuit. Playing slide guitar and blues harp, accompanied with his own vocals, Winter performed hard rock, blues-rock and boogie rock, creating a style uniquely his own. Winter recorded for many labels, such as Columbia Records, Dart Records and Pacemaker Records.
- Carolyn Wonderland (born Carolyn Bradford, November 9, 1972) Singer-songwriter and musician.
- Oscar "Buddy" Woods – (April 7, 1903 – December 14, 1955) Born near Natchitoches, Louisiana, Woods was an early pioneer in lap steel, bottleneck slide guitar playing, who recorded thirty-five tracks between 1930 and 1940. He recorded solo and as part of a duo (Shreveport Home Wreckers) and a six/seven piece group, the Wampus Cats.
