= Rob Cooper (blues musician) =

American blues pianist and songwriter

- Born: Robert Cooper
- Origin: Houston, Texas, United States
- Genres: Texas blues
- Occupations: Pianist, songwriter
- Instrument: Piano
- Years active: 1930s
- Labels: Bluebird, Victor

Robert Cooper was an American Texas blues pianist and songwriter. He was part of the "Santa Fe Group", a loose ensemble of black blues pianists who played in the many juke joints abutting the Atchison, Topeka and Santa Fe Railway. In 1934, he was the first of that Santa Fe Group to record, and is best known as one of Joe Pullum's piano accompanists. Cooper played on a number of tracks between 1934 and 1936, for recordings issued by Bluebird and Victor.

Little is documented of Cooper's life outside of his recording career.

== Life and career ==
One historian noted "Rob Cooper... a few years older than Hersal Thomas" (Thomas was born in 1906), although nothing more is known of Cooper's birth, and only small details of his life prior to his involvement in recording music. The same source stated "Among the best of the Santa Fe group were Rob Cooper of Houston...", and he had a similar playing style to Robert Shaw and Conish "Pinetop" Burks. Cooper's recordings often had a ragtime component, notably on his self-billed recordings, "West Dallas Drag" and "West Dallas Drag No. 2".

Cooper's first recording session took place on April 3, 1934, at the Texas Hotel, in San Antonio, Texas. He recorded six tracks. The first was as the piano accompanist to Joe Pullum (incorrectly credited on the record label as Joe Pullem), on Pullum's self-penned song, "Black Gal What Makes Your Head So Hard?". Another was a piano solo by Cooper of his own "West Dallas Drag". They were issued as two sides of a Bluebird Records, 10 inch, 78 rpm disc. The disc reportedly sold in large quantities.

Cooper returned to San Antonio with Pullum on January 29, 1935, to record eight more sides. In addition to accompanying Pullum on songs such as "Married Woman Blues" and "Rack it Back and Tell it Right", Cooper recorded a couple of largely instrumental numbers of his own, "McKinney Street Stomp" and "Blues With Class", on both of which Pullum added spoken asides. Cooper also waxed a variant of his earlier effort, named "West Dallas Drag No. 2". "McKinney Street Stomp" and the two versions of "West Dallas Drag", were Cooper's take on an earlier tune, "The Ma Grinder", originally composed by Robert Shaw. This was a technically complex number, which allowed Cooper to utilise his many links to stride and ragtime piano playing. His usage of 'tens' in the left-hand, indicated him to be "a very accomplished piano player". These series of recordings were issued on the Victor label. A third session occurred on February 25, 1936, resulting in Cooper backing Pullum on tracks released as singles on the Bluebird label. These were "Come On, If You're Comin'" b/w "Swing Them Blues"; "Bonus Blues" b/w "Woman Trouble Blues"; and "Bedroom Blues" b/w "Hattie Green". The duo were assisted on these recordings by Chester Boone on trumpet and Melvin Martin on guitar. Ultimately, Pullum was accompanied on his recordings by two different pianists; typically Cooper on his earlier discs, and Andy Boy on his later efforts.

Following this, Cooper's existence becomes uncertain. Guido van Rijn located an advertisement in the Chicago Defender dated March 16, 1946, regarding Marvin Cates and his Earls of Rhythm, featuring a Robert Cooper (piano, vocals); but it is not certain whether this was the same individual. Another source said simply "Rob Cooper disappeared after woman trouble..." No other details seem to exist.

"West Dallas Drag" and "West Dallas Drag No. 2" both appeared on the 1977 compilation album, The Piano Blues Vol. 8: Texas Seaport 1934-1937. Most of Cooper's recordings, including his piano solos, can be found on Joe Pullum : Complete Recorded Works, Vol. 1 (1934-35).

== Legacy ==
Bill Wyman chose "West Dallas Drag," as originally recorded by Cooper in San Antonio in 1934, as one of the tracks on the compilation album, Bill Wyman's Blues Odyssey (2002).

== Discography ==
=== Compilation albums ===
- The Piano Blues Vol. 8 Texas Seaport 1934-1937 – (1977) – Magpie
- Joe Pullum : Complete Recorded Works, Vol. 1 (1934-35) – (1995) – Document
  - Personnel: Joe Pullum (vocals); Rob Cooper, Andy Boy (piano)
- Joe Pullum : Complete Recorded Works, Vol. 2 (1933-51) – (1995) – Document
  - Personnel: Joe Pullum (vocals); Andy Boy (vocals, piano); Walter "Cowboy" Washington (vocals); Melvin Martin, Tiny Webb (guitar); Chester Boone (trumpet); Rob Cooper, Lloyd Glenn (piano); William K. "Billy" Hadnott (double bass); Bob Harvey (drums)

== See also ==
- List of Texas blues musicians
