= Pinetop Burks =

- Born: Conish Burks; August 7, 1907
- Origin: Houston, Texas, United States
- Died: January 11, 1947 (aged 39) Corpus Christi, Texas, U.S.
- Genres: Texas blues
- Occupations: Pianist, songwriter
- Instrument: Piano
- Years active: 1930s

Pinetop Burks (August 7, 1907 – January 11, 1947) was an American Texas blues pianist and songwriter. He was part of the "Santa Fe Group", a loose ensemble of black blues pianists who played in the many juke joints abutting the Atchison, Topeka and Santa Fe Railway.

Little is documented of Burks life outside of his brief recording career.

== Life and career ==
Conish Burks was born in 1907, and apparently raised near Richmond, Texas, although only small detail of his life exists. He had a similar playing style to Rob Cooper and Robert Shaw. Shaw recalled meeting Burks and stated about him "Connie Burks, a dark fellow, about my size, maybe a little thicker than me. When I met him, he couldn't play, so I showed him some. Three years later, when I was in Richmond again, he played better than me".

On October 25, 1937, Burks recorded his only known output of six tracks. This occurred in one session for Vocalion Records in San Antonio, Texas. Nevertheless, it was noted that Burks was a pianist with "incredible technique and melodic feeling". His recording included one track named "Shake The Shack", but it was in reality a variant of "Pinetop's Boogie Woogie". This presumably gave Burks his nickname. Most of his recorded repertoire saw Burks compose other varieties based on earlier material. It is documented that, in 1937, Vocalion released a 78 rpm disc with side one containing "Aggravatin' Mama Blues" and side two being "Jack of All Trades Blues" (Vocalion 03979).

Burks was part of the "Santa Fe Group", a loose ensemble of black blues pianists who played in the many juke joints abutting the Atchison, Topeka and Santa Fe Railway.

He disappeared from the scene in the late 1930s. By 1941, he was enlisted and fought in World War II, but returned home due to being 'badly wounded'. Burks died on January 11, 1947, in Corpus Christi, Texas.

All of Burks's recordings were collated on the compilation album, San Antonio Blues 1937, released in 1994 by Document Records.

== See also ==
- List of Texas blues musicians
