= Robert Ealey =

American blues singer and drummer

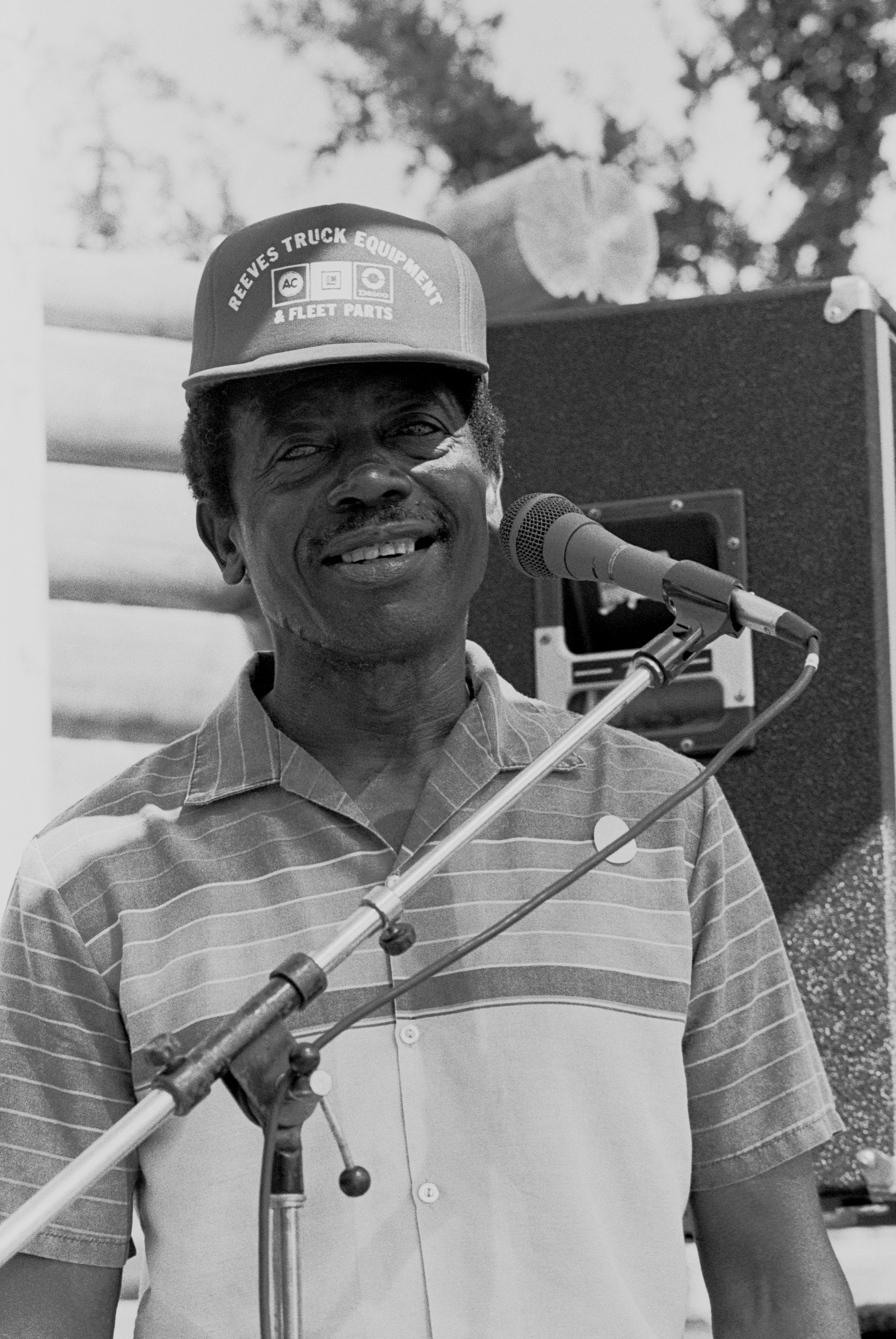
- Robert Ealey performs in Fort Worth, Texas in June 1985

Background information
- Born: Robert Daniel Ealey; December 6, 1925; Texarkana, Texas, United States
- Died: March 8, 2001 (aged 75); Fort Worth, Texas, United States
- Genres: Texas blues, electric blues
- Occupations: Singer, songwriter, drummer
- Instrument: Vocals
- Years active: 1940s–2000
- Labels: Black Top, various

Robert Daniel Ealey (December 6, 1925 – March 8, 2001) was an American electric blues singer, who performed Texas blues. Among other releases, he recorded a couple of albums for Black Top Records in the 1990s, having earlier formed a duo with U.P. Wilson. Ealey also worked with Tone Sommer, Mike Buck, and Mike Morgan.

Ealey's best-known work includes "One Love One Kiss" and "Turn Out the Lights". He variously worked with the Boogie Chillun Boys, the Juke Jumpers and the Five Careless Lovers.

== Life and career ==
Ealey was born in Texarkana, Texas. In his teens he sang in a quartet in his church.

Following service in the Army in World War II, Ealey moved to Dallas in 1951, having been singing professionally from the age of 20. In Fort Worth, he formed a duo, the Boogie Chillun Boys, with the guitarist U. P. Wilson. The Boogie Chillun Boys provided inspiration to fellow Texan singer and guitarist Ray Sharpe. The Bluebird Club in Fort Worth was Ealey's musical base for more than thirty years. His involvement was such that he co-owned the club from 1977 to 1989. His 1973 live album, Live at the New Bluebird Nightclub, was billed as by Robert Ealey and the Five Careless Lovers, and included contributions from the drummer, Mike Buck. It was co-produced by T-Bone Burnett.

By the 1990s, Ealey and the guitarist Tone Sommer started touring more widely, and their authentic Texas blues found a wider audience in the United States and Europe. Television advertisement work also expanded the recognition of Ealey's music. His 1996 album, Turn Out the Lights, issued by Black Top Records, saw Ealey work with blues accompanists including Mike Morgan and Sommer on guitar. The 1997 follow-up, I Like Music When I Party, was similarly successful.

Ealey died in Fort Worth on March 8, 2001, at the age of 75, of undisclosed causes following an automobile accident the previous December. He was interred with military honors at the Dallas–Fort Worth National Cemetery.

In 2003, Aristokraft issued the compilation album Robert Ealey: Blues That Time Forgot.

Ealey is the subject of the 2020 Joe Nick Patoski book, Robert Ealey and His Five Careless Lovers.

== Selected album discography ==
Year	Title	Record label
1973	Live at the New Bluebird Nightclub	Blue Royal
1981	Bluebird Open	Amazing
1995	If You Need Me	Topcat
1996	Turn Out the Lights	Black Top
1997	I Like Music When I Party	Black Top

== See also ==
- List of electric blues musicians
- List of Texas blues musicians
- Texas Roadhouse Music
