= Andy Boy =

Andy Boy may refer to:

- Andy Boy (brand), a brand of vegetables by D'Arrigo Brothers
- Andy Boy (musician), American Texas blues pianist and songwriter
