= Andy Boy (musician) =

- Born: Anthony Boyd; November 10, 1904; Galveston, Texas, U.S.
- Genres: Texas blues
- Occupations: Pianist, songwriter
- Instrument: Piano
- Years active: 1930s

Andy Boy (born Anthony Boyd, November 10, 1904 – unknown) was an American Texas blues pianist and songwriter. He was part of the "Santa Fe Group", a loose ensemble of black blues pianists who played in the many juke joints abutting the Atchison, Topeka and Santa Fe Railway.

Details of his life outside of his recording career are sketchy, including a complete lack of information relating to his death.

== Life and career ==
Anthony Boyd was born in 1904 in Galveston, Texas, United States.

He created some notoriety in the 1920s, when one newspaper reported that Andy Boy had been accused of having attempted to kill his wife. On another occasion, Boy was arrested along with several others for illegal gambling, after police raided a local bar. Boy used the experience some months later when composing one of his songs, "House Raid Blues". Robert Shaw recalled meeting Andy Boy and stated about him "He was a little fellow, just a little older than me. He was the top kicker of Galveston".

His piano playing incorporated ragtime stylings into the blues. Combining that in his left hand with a jazz element, was counteracted by clusters of chords or runs with his right. He accompanied the blues vocalist Joe Pullum on eleven songs, all of which were recorded on August 13, 1935. They were released as a series of singles on Bluebird Records. Andy Boy then recorded eight solo tracks in San Antonio. He also accompanied Walter "Cowboy" Washington on four sides at the same recording session, which took place on February 24, 1937.

His recording career over, he left Texas to move to Oklahoma. In the early 1940s he was reportedly in Kansas City, and when his whereabouts were queried in 1960 by Paul Oliver, Buster Pickens told him that Andy Boy was still alive and residing in New York, but thereafter the trail ran dry.

All of Boy's recordings were collated on the compilation album, Joe Pullum Vol. 2 (1935-1951), released in 1994 by Document Records. The 2021 release, I Need You Blues, covered the same material but lacks Boy's work accompanying Pullum.

== Confusion ==
In the book Blues and Gospel Records: 1890–1943 (1997), it stated that "This performer's surname was 'Boy'". However, subsequent research revealed differing information. Michael Hortig, an Austrian author, photographer and blues historian, eventually uncovered his birth details as shown above.

Andy Boy's 'stage name' is not to be confused with the brand name used by the California-based D'Arrigo Brothers, for their range of fresh vegetables.

== Legacy ==
Bill Wyman chose Walter "Cowboy" Washington's recording of "Ice Pick Mama", with piano accompaniment from Andy Boy, as one of the tracks on the compilation album, Bill Wyman's Blues Odyssey (2002).

== See also ==
- List of Texas blues musicians
