= Bob Kirkpatrick (musician) =

American guitarist, singer and songwriter

- Born: January 10, 1934 (age 92); Haynesville, Louisiana, United States
- Genres: Texas blues, electric blues
- Occupations: Guitarist, singer, songwriter
- Instrument: Guitar
- Years active: 1960s–present
- Labels: Folkways, JSP, Topcat, Smithsonian Folkways

Bob Kirkpatrick (born January 10, 1934) is an American Texas blues guitarist, singer and songwriter, whose recorded work has been released on three albums.

One commentator noted that Kirkpatrick's 1996 album, Going Back to Texas, "is a charming record. Kirkpatrick has a classy, jazzy guitar style and he leads his band through a set of originals and covers, putting an attractive, swinging spin on the music." Kirkpatrick was primarily influenced by B.B. King.

== Biography ==
Kirkpatrick was born in Haynesville, Louisiana. He became interested in music at an early age, learning to play the piano and later the guitar. He was drafted for military service in 1953 and fought in the Korean War until he was discharged in 1955. Back home he enrolled at Grambling College, and he backed Ivory Joe Hunter during this time. But it was his attendance at a B.B. King concert in 1958 that led to Kirkpatrick pursuing blues music, albeit primarily as a part-time musician due to his daily working life. Kirkpatrick had previously settled in Dallas, Texas, and, in 1968, declined the opportunity to back Bobby Bland on tour, preferring to remain at home with his young family. He continued to play locally in clubs.

He played three times at the Newport Folk Festival, his first appearance there being in 1970. His performances there were assisted by his brother, who was on the board of directors of the Festival. His debut recording was the album Feeling the Blues (1973), issued by Folkways Records. The record was scarcely promoted, and Kirkpatrick later remarked, "I don't think it added anything of significance to my career." The album included his cover version of B.B. King's blues standard "Sweet Little Angel". Continuing to work for various federal agencies, he also held a weekend residency at an Elks lodge in south Dallas for 16 years, until his retirement from the U.S. Department of Agriculture in May 1986.

From that time onwards, Kirkpatrick increased his regional club performances. He recorded Going Back to Texas in 1996, his first release in 23 years. In late 1997, he followed this with a lengthy tour across the UK, Ireland and France.

His album Drive Across Texas was released by Topcat Records in 2000.

Feeling the Blues was reissued by Smithsonian Folkways in 2012.

== Discography ==
Year	Title	Record label
1973	Feeling the Blues	Folkways Records
1996	Going Back to Texas	JSP Records
2000	Drive Across Texas	Topcat Records
2012	Feeling the Blues (reissue)	Smithsonian Folkways

== See also ==
- List of Texas blues musicians
- List of electric blues musicians
