= Pete Mayes =

American blues singer and guitarist

- Born: Floyd Davis Mayes; March 21, 1938; Double Bayou, Texas, United States
- Died: December 16, 2008 (aged 70) Houston, Texas, United States
- Genres: Texas blues, electric blues
- Occupations: Singer, guitarist, songwriter
- Instruments: Vocals, guitar
- Years active: 1950s–2008
- Label: Various

Pete Mayes (born Floyd Davis Mayes, March 21, 1938 – December 16, 2008) was an American Texas blues singer, guitarist and songwriter. He was variously known as Texas Pete Mayes and T-Bone Man (because his guitar playing resembled that of his hero T-Bone Walker).

Mayes made few recordings but For Pete's Sake was released in 1998, nearly fifty years after he first appeared on stage. It was his most widely distributed recording and won the Blues Foundation's W. C. Handy Award in the category Comeback Album of the Year.

== Biography ==
Mayes was born and raised in Double Bayou, Texas. The town was home to a dance hall, which played a significant part in his life. As a child he learned with a cheap guitar without a full set of strings and practiced for hours each day. Mayes was aged 16 when T-Bone Walker invited him on stage to perform.

In the early 1950s, Mayes played with various bands at the local dance hall. After several years he led his own group, opening the show for touring musicians. While in the United States Army, Mayes worked with the Contrasts, which comprised three white and three black musicians. Mayes learned from watching T-Bone Walker and Gatemouth Brown, and he later cited Walker, B.B. King, Kenny Burrell, plus Lowell Fulson as major influences.

In 1960 Mayes relocated to Houston, and during the following decade he played with Fulson, Big Joe Turner, Percy Mayfield, Bill Doggett, and Junior Parker. Mayes also toured with the jazz musicians Count Basie and Dizzy Gillespie. Unable to make a living as a full-time musician, Mayes worked as a ranch hand and then as a painter for the Houston Independent School District. He retired from the latter job with disability pay.

Mayes performed whenever possible. He undertook tours in the 1970s and played frequently in the 1990s, even though his health had started to fail. In 1983, he inherited from an uncle ownership of the local dance hall. In 1986, Double Trouble Records of the Netherlands issued Texas Guitar Master, which included a live "Battle of the Guitars" with Joe "Guitar" Hughes. In 1996, Mayes appeared at the Long Beach Blues Festival.

By the time For Pete's Sake was released (1998), Mayes was still actively managing the Double Bayou dance hall. Following years of ill health, which included heart problems, diabetes and the amputation of both legs, he died in Houston in December 2008, aged 70. He was survived by his wife, a son and a brother.

== Selected discography ==
=== Albums ===
- For Pete's Sake, Antone's (1988)
- Live! at Double Bayou Dance Hall, GoldRhyme Music (2005)

=== Singles ===
- "The Things I Used To Do", Home Cooking Records (1965)
- "Crazy Woman", Ovide (1969)
- "Movin' Out", Ovide (1969)

== See also ==
- List of Texas blues musicians
