= Santa Fe Group =

Santa Fe Group may refer to:

- Santa Fe Group (geology), a geological formation near Santa Fe, New Mexico, US, which includes the Ancha Formation
- Santa Fe Group, the name of the multinational holding and investment company East Asiatic Company, later EAC Invest A/S, from 2015 to 2019
- Santa Fe Group (musical style), a style of blues piano playing in the 1920s and 1930s in the US
