= Antle =

Antle is an English surname. Notable people with this surname include:

- Bob Antle, cofounder of Tanimura & Antle
- Doc Antle (born 1960), American animal trainer
- Jim Antle, editor of The American Conservative

== See also ==
- ANTLE, Rolls-Royce Trent programme
