= Lester Williams =

Lester Williams may refer to:

- Lester Williams (American football)
- Lester Williams (musician)
