= Joe Pullum =

American songwriter (1905–1964)

- Born: December 25, 1905; Anniston, Alabama, U.S.
- Died: January 7, 1964 (aged 58) Los Angeles, California, U.S.
- Genres: Blues
- Occupations: Singer, songwriter
- Instrument: Vocals
- Years active: 1934–1951
- Labels: Bluebird Records, Document Records

Joseph E. Pullum (December 25, 1905 — January 7, 1964) was an American blues singer and songwriter.

== Biography ==
Pullum, an Alabama-born nightclub singer, was one of the more obscure blues stars. He was accompanied on his few recordings by two pianists; Rob Cooper on his earlier discs, and Andy Boy on his later efforts. Pullum's major success was with his self-written song, "Black Gal What Makes Your Head So Hard?" (1934). It sold in large quantities and was covered by Leroy Carr, Skip James, Mary Johnson, Josh White, Bumble Bee Slim, the Harlem Hamfats, Smokey Hogg, Jimmie Gordon, Speckled Red, James Crutchfield and Robert Shaw. His subsequent recordings did not fare as well.

Pullum recorded four sessions, which yielded a total of 30 tracks, between April 1934 and February 1936. The tracks included two intended sequels to "Black Gal", but overall sales were modest. Pullum later performed on radio on the Houston station, KTLC, backed by another pianist, Preston "Peachy" Chase. Pullum relocated to Los Angeles, California, in the 1940s, and he further interpreted "Black Gal" into "My Woman", accompanied by Lloyd Glenn, on Swingtime Records in 1948. He also reputedly recorded a demo with Specialty Records in 1953.

Although he was a gifted songwriter, few of his contemporaries seemed able to recall him.

Pullum died in 1964, aged 58, and was buried in Houston, Texas. All of his known recordings were collated on two albums released by Document Records in 1995.

== Legacy ==
Music journalist Tony Russell wrote that "Pullum's high clear voice, drifting over the peaks and valleys of "Black Gal What Makes Your Head So Hard?", brought the shock of the new into mid-1930s blues. No one before, male or female, had sung with such feline grace. What's more, Pullum's ethereal manner hardly prepared the listener for the song's scenario of insults, smoking pistols and suicide".

== Discography ==
- Complete Recorded Works, Vol. 1 (1934-35) - (1995) - Document
  - Personnel: Joe Pullum (vocals); Rob Cooper, Andy Boy (piano)
- Complete Recorded Works, Vol. 2 (1933-51) - (1995) - Document
  - Personnel: Joe Pullum (vocals); Andy Boy (vocals, piano); Walter "Cowboy" Washington (vocals); Melvin Martin, Mitchell "Tiny" Webb (guitar); Chester Boone (trumpet); Rob Cooper, Lloyd Glenn (piano); William K. "Billy" Hadnott (double bass); Bob Harvey (drums)
