= U.P. Wilson =

American blues guitarist and singer (1934–2004)

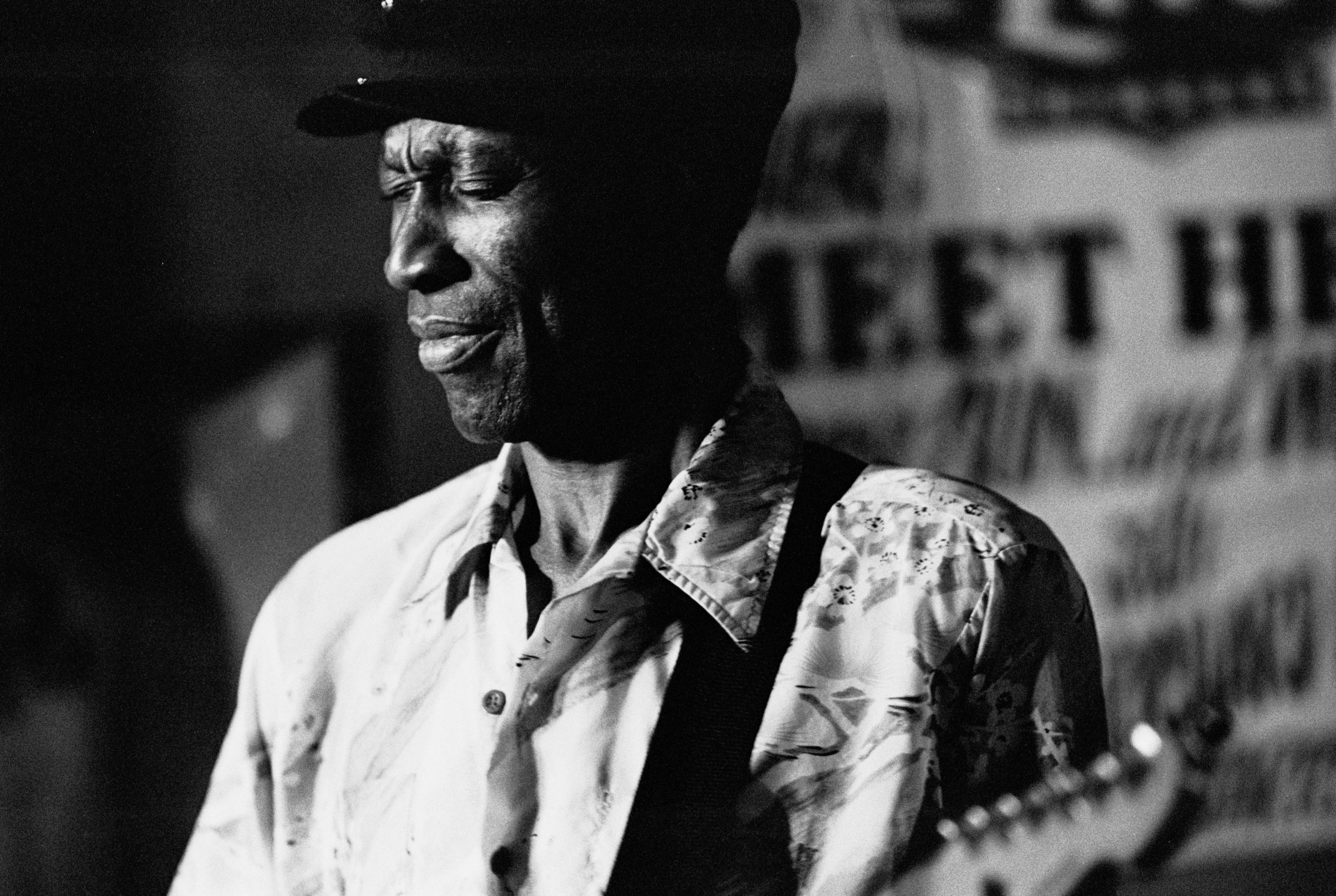
- U.P. Wilson at the Hi Hat Lounge in Fort Worth, Texas. April, 1993.

Background information
- Also known as: Texas Tornado, Atomic Guitar
- Born: Huary Perry Wilson; September 4, 1934; Catto Parish, Shreveport, Louisiana, United States
- Died: September 22, 2004 (aged 70) Paris, France
- Genres: Blues
- Occupations: Guitarist, singer, songwriter
- Instruments: Guitar, vocals
- Years active: 1960s–2004
- Labels: JSP, various

Huary Perry "U.P." Wilson (September 4, 1934 – September 22, 2004) was an American electric blues guitarist and singer who performed Texas blues. He recorded five albums for JSP Records, the first being Boogie Boy! The Texas Guitar Tornado Returns! He was known for playing a style of deep Southern soul blues that was gospel inflected.

== Biography ==
Wilson was born on a farm in Caddo Parish, Shreveport, Louisiana, to Carrie Lee and Tommy Wilson, and was raised in West Dallas. He learned the blues from ZuZu Bollin, Cat Man Fleming, Frankie Lee Sims, Mercy Baby and Nappy "Chin" Evans. Wilson later relocated from Dallas to Fort Worth and formed a duo, the Boogie Chillun Boys, with the drummer and vocalist Robert Ealey. Later he worked with Cornell Dupree, until Dupree left to become a session musician. The Boogie Chillun Boys provided inspiration to another Texan singer and guitarist, Ray Sharpe.

Wilson was imprisoned in the John R. Lindsey State Jail, in Jacksboro, Texas, for six months in 1967 and 1968 on a conviction of possession of cocaine. Upon his release he moved to Paris, France.

From 1967 onward he raised his family and worked in Fort Worth during the day as a school janitor. At night, Wilson performed as a sideman in local nightclubs. By the late 1970s, Wilson and Ealey played at a Fort Worth club named the New Bluebird, where they attracted crowds of Texas blues fans. By 1987, Wilson had begun solo recording and touring around Texas. However, he rejoined Ealey in his new band, the Lovers, the following year.

The music journalist Tony Russell noted that Wilson put on a show, playing one-handed while drinking, smoking and greeting his fans, but behind the tricks and the hyped language used in his billings ("Texas Tornado", "Atomic Guitar", etc.) Wilson was a musician with a talent for more than just getting boys to boogie down. His peculiar decision to sing in falsetto flawed his 1995 release This Is U.P. Wilson, but subsequent releases led to the rediscovery of his blend of Texas shuffles and low-down blues. Blues & Rhythm magazine stated that Wilson's music was "superb Texas blues from one of the discoveries of the 80s".

For most of the last decade of his life, Wilson toured the European blues circuit and throughout the United States. Among his activities were appearances at the Chicago Blues Festival and accompanying Albert Collins.

Wilson went to a hospital in Paris for surgery and died there on September 22, 2004, at the age of 70. His wife, Rosie, had died earlier. He was survived by two daughters and a son.

== Discography ==
- On My Way (Red Lightnin' [UK] 0078, 1988; CD reissue: Fedora [US] 5014, 1999)
- Wild Texas Guitar (Double Trouble [Belgium] 3023, 1989)
- Attack of the Atomic Guitar live album with Paul Orta & the Kingpins (Red Lightnin' [UK] 0094, 1992)
- Boogie Boy! The Texas Guitar Tornado Returns! (JSP [UK] 255, 1994)
- Texas Blues Party, Vol. 1: The Texas Tornado U.P. Wilson Live At Schooner's Dallas (Wolf [Austria] 120.630, 1995)
- This Is U.P. Wilson (JSP [UK] 266, 1995)
- Whirlwind (JSP [UK] 277, 1996)
- U.P. Wilson and Texas Trailer Trash (Felony [US] 1001, 1998)
- The Good, The Bad, The Blues (JSP [UK] 2103 1998)
- Booting (JSP [UK] 2129, 1999)

== See also ==
- List of electric blues musicians
- List of Texas blues musicians

== Quotations ==
It's tough here in Texas. Everywhere you look there's guitar players.

— U.P. Wilson

U.P. Wilson was my greatest guitar inspiration for real blues.

— Stevie Ray Vaughan
