= Double Bayou, Texas =

Double Bayou
- unincorporated community
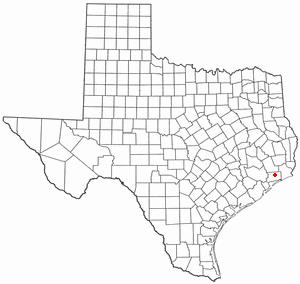
- Location of Double Bayou, Texas
- Coordinates: 29°41′34″N 94°37′45″W
- Country: United States
- State: Texas
- County: Chambers
- Elevation: 13 ft (4.0 m)
- Time zone: UTC-6 (Central (CST))
  - Summer (DST): UTC-5 (CDT)
- Area code: 409
- GNIS feature ID: 1378220

Double Bayou is an unincorporated community in Chambers County, Texas, United States. According to the Handbook of Texas, the community had a population of 400 in 2000. It is located within the Greater Houston metropolitan area.

== History ==
In 1847, James Jackson established a 26,000 acres (11,000 ha) ranch in the region. The Jackson ranch was enclosed at an early period, even though the majority of operations of this kind operated on the open range. At Double Bayou, the local general store—founded by John Jackson before 1900—acted as the hub of the community. The region's widely dispersed residents also had gathering places in the form of a cotton gin and sugar cane mill. Post offices at Double Bayou were open from 1860 to 1866 and again from 1876 to 1919. Boats continued far into the twentieth century to serve as the area's principal mode of transportation, sailing on Trinity Bay and Double Bayou. Like with many other communities of Texas' higher coastal prairies, the people of Double Bayou suffered greatly from the floods that accompanied the hurricane of 1915. In the 1930s, the population of the remote rural area, which was predominantly black, was believed to be between 150 and 300. In the middle of the 1970s, the Double Bayou hamlet was identified on maps by several homes and churches. In 1981, 26,136 tons were handled by the Double Bayou port. 400 people were living in the community as of 1990 and 2000.

James Jackson's grandson, Ralph Semmes Jackson, was born here in the early 1900s and was the author of Home on the Double Bayou. His brother, Guy Cade, became an early conservationist and county judge. Besides the Galveston Hurricane, several other storms struck Double Bayou, resulting in the loss of cattle one winter. It is also the home of a dance hall.

== Geography ==
Double Bayou is located between the two forks of the Double Bayou and just north of the intersection of Farm to Market Roads 1985 and 562, 50 mi (80 km) southwest of Beaumont in west-central Chambers County.

== Education ==
Double Bayou had its own school in the 1970s. Today, the Anahuac Independent School District operates schools in the area.

== Notable people ==
- Pete Mayes, Texas blues singer, was born in Double Bayou and played at the local dance hall.
- Frank Sterling, oil industry businessman, grew up in Double Bayou.
