= Texas roadhouse music =

Texas roadhouse music is a musical genre that combines blues, classic rock, and outlaw country. It is characterized by heavy emphasis on lead guitar arrangements, and encompasses folk-influenced singer-songwriter material.

The style developed throughout the late 1950s and early 1960s in roadhouses, bars and juke joints in and around Fort Worth, Texas, especially along the Jacksboro Highway. It came mostly from white musicians combining the music that was created by country and western, blues, rockabilly, and Tejano musicians in the area.

The genre has never been typified by a specific movement, group or musician, rather it has been constantly maintained in the vibe of Fort Worth-area musicians of various styles.

Typical artists of this genre include:

- Delbert McClinton
- Buddy Whittington
- Rollo Smith
- Dave Millsap
- Sumtner Bruton
- Screamin' Armadillos

Artists who influenced the genre:

- Robert Ealey
- U.P. Wilson
- Freddie King
- Waylon Jennings
- Willie Nelson
- Billy Joe Shaver
- Ronnie Hawkins
- Doug Sahm (Sir Douglas Quintet)
- ZZ Top
- Stevie Ray Vaughan
- The Fabulous Thunderbirds
- Bugs Henderson
