= Spreckels, California =

Unincorporated community in California, United States

- Unincorporated Community; Census Designated Place
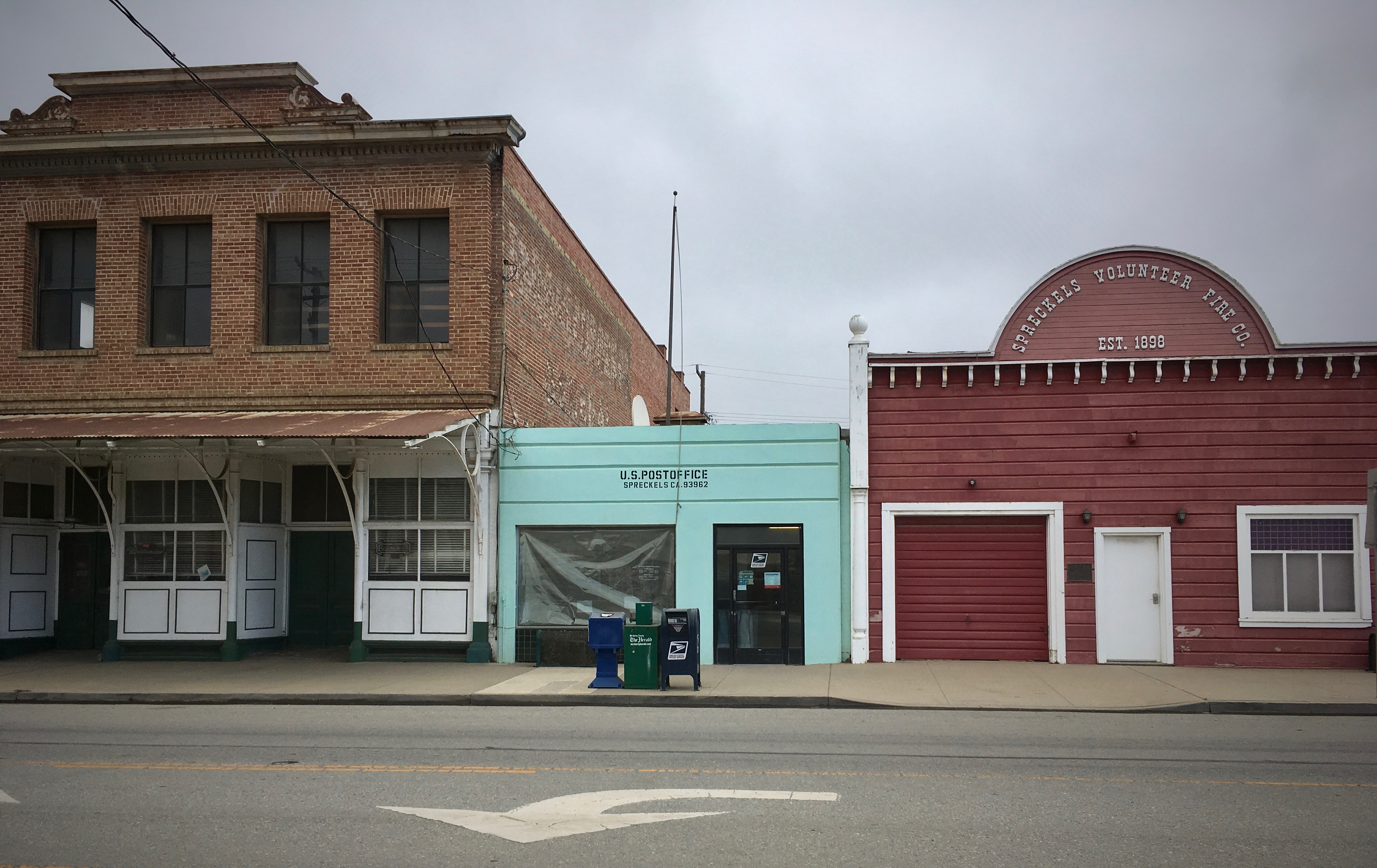
- Spreckels in 2018

- Location in Monterey County and the state of California

- Location in the United States
- Coordinates: 36°37′19″N 121°38′49″W
- Country: United States
- State: California
- County: Monterey

Government
  - State Senator: John Laird (D)
  - Assemblymember: Robert Rivas (D)
  - U. S. Rep.: Jimmy Panetta (D)

Area
  - Total: 0.122 sq mi (0.316 km^{2})
  - Land: 0.122 sq mi (0.316 km^{2})
  - Water: 0 sq mi (0 km^{2}) 0%
- Elevation: 62 ft (19 m)

Population (2020)
  - Total: 692
  - Density: 5,670/sq mi (2,190/km^{2})
- Time zone: UTC−8 (PST)
  - Summer (DST): UTC−7 (PDT)
- ZIP Code: 93962
- Area code: 831
- FIPS code: 06-73612
- GNIS feature ID: 1659842

Spreckels is an unincorporated community and census-designated place (CDP) in the Salinas Valley of Monterey County, California, United States. Spreckels is located 3 miles (5 km) south of Salinas, at an elevation of 62 ft (19 m). Its population was 692 at the 2020 census.

Spreckels is one of the best-preserved company towns in the United States. It was built to house workers for the Spreckels Sugar Company plant, which operated there from 1899 until 1982, named after its founder "Sugar King" Claus Spreckels. When it opened, the Spreckels plant was the world's largest sugar beet factory, each day consuming 13,000,000 US gal (49,000,000 L) of water—with much of it pumped from wells—to process 3,000 short tons (2,700 t) of beets.

Spreckels is associated with the writer John Steinbeck, who lived and worked there for a time, and used it as a setting in his novel Tortilla Flat. Spreckels was used as a location for the 1955 Steinbeck movie East of Eden.

== History ==
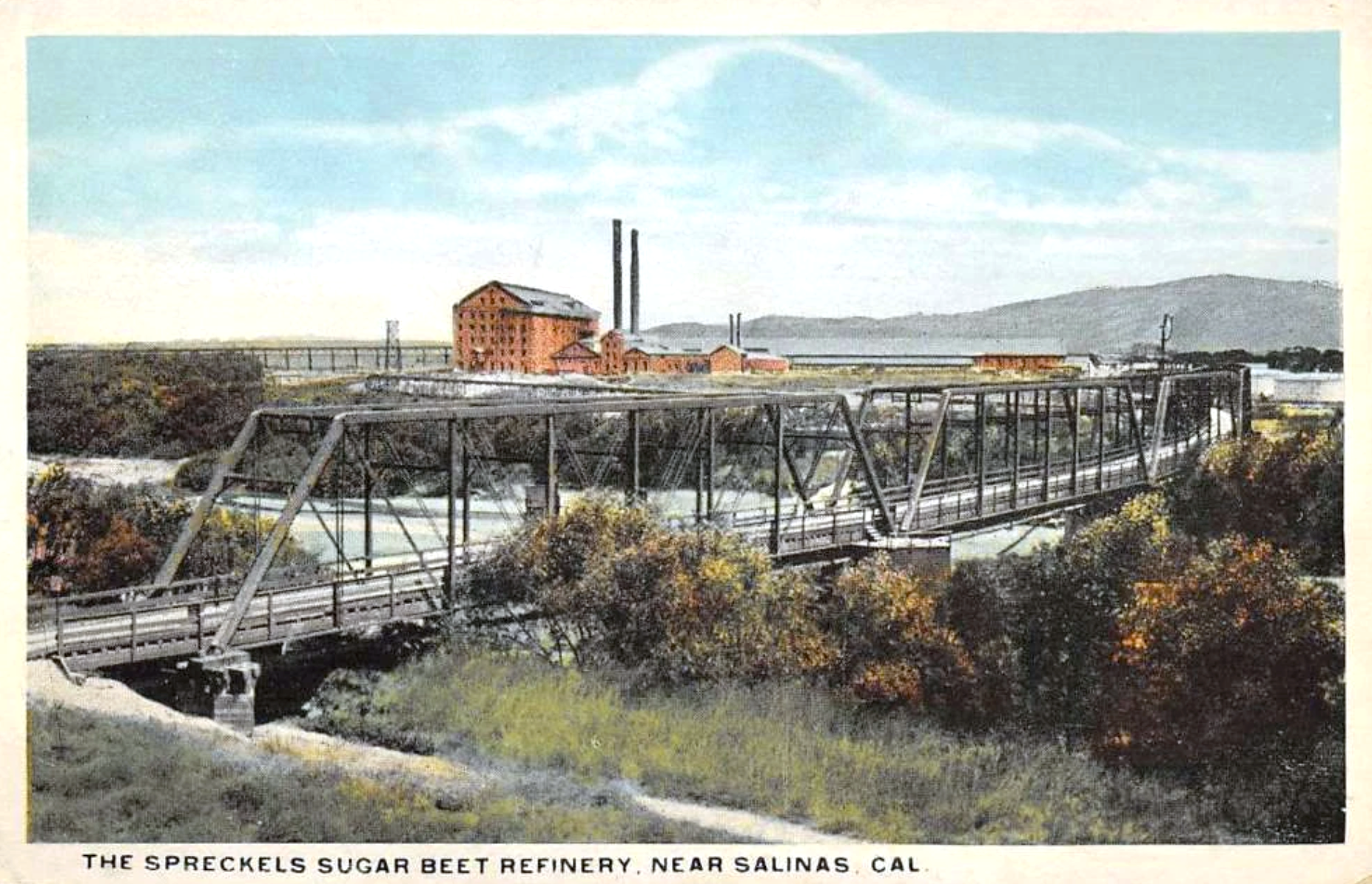
Spreckels Sugar Beet Refinery (c. 1918)

The Spreckels post office opened in 1898. The name honors Claus Spreckels, who built a sugar mill at the site. The company began to relinquish control of the town when they started selling homes in the community to the public in about 1925.

== Geography ==
Spreckels is located in northern Monterey County at 36°37′19″N 121°38′49″W. It is approximately 3 miles (4.8 km) south of Salinas, the county seat, on the north side of the Salinas River, and approximately 2 miles (3 km) east of Old Hilltown.

According to the United States Census Bureau, the Spreckels CDP has a total area of 0.1 square miles (0.26 km^{2}), all land.

== Climate ==
This region experiences warm and dry summers, with no average monthly temperatures above 71.6 °F (22.0 °C). According to the Köppen climate classification, Spreckels has a warm-summer Mediterranean climate, Csb on climate maps.

== Employers ==
Spreckels is home to two major agricultural employers: Tanimura & Antle and D'Arrigo Brothers.

== Demographics ==
Historical population
Census	Pop.	Note	%±
2000	485		—
2010	673		38.8%
2020	692		2.8%
U.S. Decennial Census; 1860–1870 1880-1890; 1900 1910 1920; 1930 1940 1950; 1960 1970 1980; 1990 2000 2010

Spreckels first appeared as a census designated place in the 2000 U.S. census.

=== 2020 ===
The 2020 United States census reported that Spreckels had a population of 692. The population density was 5,672.1 inhabitants per square mile (2,190.0/km^{2}). The racial makeup of Spreckels was 426 (61.6%) White, 4 (0.6%) African American, 9 (1.3%) Native American, 19 (2.7%) Asian, 6 (0.9%) Pacific Islander, 75 (10.8%) from other races, and 153 (22.1%) from two or more races. Hispanic or Latino of any race were 232 persons (33.5%).

The whole population lived in households. There were 242 households, out of which 97 (40.1%) had children under the age of 18 living in them, 161 (66.5%) were married-couple households, 11 (4.5%) were cohabiting couple households, 55 (22.7%) had a female householder with no partner present, and 15 (6.2%) had a male householder with no partner present. 44 households (18.2%) were one person, and 23 (9.5%) were one person aged 65 or older. The average household size was 2.86. There were 190 families (78.5% of all households).

The age distribution was 195 people (28.2%) under the age of 18, 32 people (4.6%) aged 18 to 24, 166 people (24.0%) aged 25 to 44, 169 people (24.4%) aged 45 to 64, and 130 people (18.8%) who were 65 years of age or older. The median age was 39.7 years. For every 100 females, there were 97.2 males.

There were 260 housing units at an average density of 2,131.1 units per square mile (822.8 units/km^{2}), of which 242 (93.1%) were occupied. Of these, 172 (71.1%) were owner-occupied, and 70 (28.9%) were occupied by renters.

=== 2010 ===
At the 2010 census, Spreckels had a population of 673. The population density was 5,509.4 inhabitants per square mile (2,127.2/km^{2}). The racial makeup of Spreckels was 483 (71.8%) White, 0 (0.0%) African American, 13 (1.9%) Native American, 26 (3.9%) Asian, 130 (19.3%) from other races, and 21 (3.1%) from two or more races. Hispanics or Latinos of any race were 193 people (28.7%).

The whole population lived in households, no one lived in noninstitutionalized group quarters and no one was institutionalized.

Of the 229 households, 89 (38.9%) had children under 18 living in them, 134 (58.5%) were opposite-sex married couples living together, 27 (11.8%) had a female householder with no husband present, 12 (5.2%) had a male householder with no wife present, 7 (3.1%) were unmarried opposite-sex partnerships, and 2 (0.9%) were same-sex married couples or partnerships; 45 households (19.7%) were one person and 17 (7.4%) had someone living alone who was 65 or older. The average household size was 2.94. There were 173 families (75.5% of households); the average family size was 3.38.

The age distribution was as follows: 172 people (25.6%) were under 18, 44 people (6.5%) were between 18 and 24, 173 people (25.7%) were between 25 and 44, 208 people (30.9%) were between 45 and 64, and 76 people (11.3%) were 65 or older. The median age was 39.4 years. For every 100 females, there were 93.9 males. Among those 18 and older, there were 92.7 males for every 100 females.

The 246 housing units had an average density of 2,013.8 per square mile; of the occupied units, 160 (69.9%) were owner-occupied and 69 (30.1%) were rented. The homeowner vacancy rate was 3.6%; the rental vacancy rate was 2.8%. In all, 467 people (69.4% of the population) lived in owner-occupied housing units and 206 people (30.6%) lived in rental housing units.

=== 2000 ===
At the 2000 census, the median household income was $58,009 and the median family income was $51,250. Males had a median income of $22,250 versus $24,750 for females. The per capita income for the CDP was $19,752. None of the families and 1.1% of the population were living below the poverty line, including none under 18 and none over 64.

== See also ==
- Spreckelsville, Hawaii - former sugarcane-industry company town in Hawaii, also started by Claus Spreckels.
