= Black Boy Shine =

American blues pianist, singer and songwriter (1908–1952)

- Born: Harold Holiday c. September 12, 1908; Fort Bend County, Texas, United States
- Died: March 28, 1952 (aged 43) Sugar Land, Texas, United States
- Genres: Texas blues
- Occupations: Pianist, singer, songwriter
- Instrument: Piano
- Years active: 1930s–1940s
- Labels: Vocalion, Melotone

Black Boy Shine (c. September 12, 1908 – March 28, 1952), born Harold Holiday, was an American Texas blues pianist, singer and songwriter. Little is known of his life outside of his recording career. He was part of the Santa Fe Group, a loose ensemble of black blues pianists who played in the many juke joints abutting the Atchison, Topeka and Santa Fe Railway. Black Boy Shine recorded almost twenty tracks between 1936 and 1937 for Vocalion and Melotone Records. Two of his tracks, "Hobo Blues" and "Ice Pick and Pistol Woman Blues", depicted the more lurid and potentially violent lives of Shine and his listeners.

== Early life ==
Harold Holiday was born on September 12, 1908 in Fort Bend County, Texas, United States. He was the son of Walter Holiday and Hattie Griffin.

== Career ==
Adopting the stage name "Black Boy Shine", he later spent most of his life based in Houston, more specifically the Fourth Ward, which ultimately influenced his style of playing the piano. Black Boy Shine was noted as a smooth singer and pianist, with an unusually sweet melodious vocal refrain and elegant playing. His songs included "Dog House Blues" and "Back Home Blues", which were in a barrelhouse format, and the majority of his repertoire dealt lyrically with the realities of life for his predominately black audience. "Hobo Blues" and "Ice Pick and Pistol Woman Blues", depicted the more lurid and potentially violent lives of that time.

In the mid-1930s, Black Boy Shine frequently met up with another pianist, Moon Mullican, when performing around Houston. Combining nicknames, for a short time in the 1930s, they performed as a duo called "Moonshine". In 1935 and 1936, Black Boy Shine recorded as an accompanist on a number of tracks for both Bernice Edwards and J. T. Smith. Alongside Edwards, he recorded piano duets including one entitled "Hot Mattress Stomp".

In 1936 and 1937, Black Boy Shine recorded solo for both Vocalion Records and Melotone Records in San Antonio and Dallas.

== Santa Fe Group ==
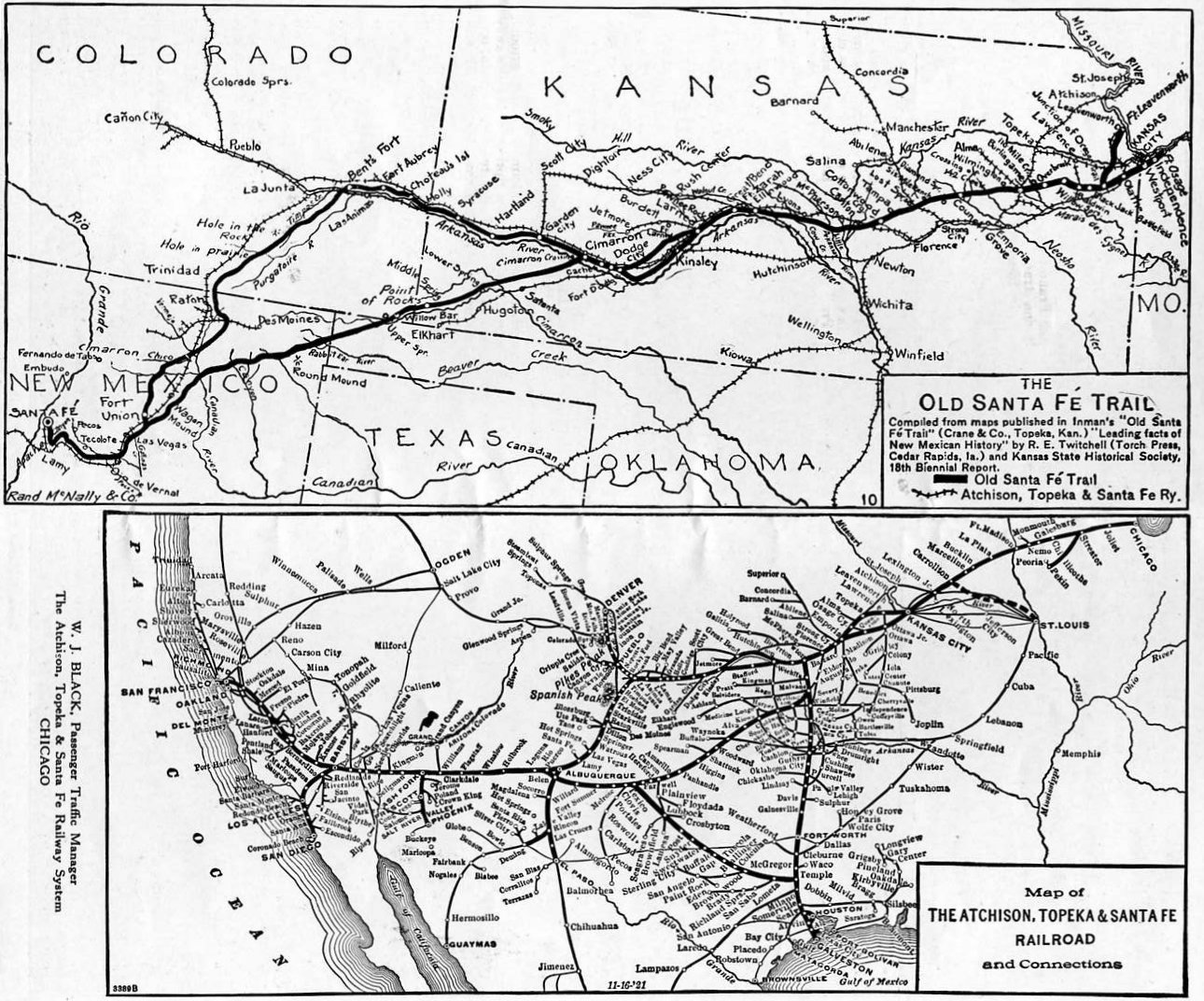
A comparison map prepared by the Santa Fe Railroad in 1921, showing the "Old Santa Fé Trail" (top) and the Atchison, Topeka and Santa Fe Railway and its connections (bottom)

The Santa Fe Group, otherwise known as the Texas Santa Fe style of piano playing, referenced an association with the Santa Fe Railroad tracks. In the 1920s and 1930s, there were numerous juke joints alongside the Atchison, Topeka and Santa Fe Railway, in which various black pianists performed in a similar manner. The style was a blend of dance music, boogie-woogie, ragtime and blues. Performers included Black Boy Shine, Black Ivory King, Robert Shaw, Buster Pickens, Pinetop Burks, Roosevelt Williams, Rob Cooper and Andy Boy, who were all recorded, although many others were not. The style is more broadly defined when referring to a map of Houston. The Santa Fe style was known as emanating from the Fourth Ward. Lightnin' Hopkins, conversely, was a Third Ward bluesman, while George Washington Thomas was an example of a Fifth Ward pianist, with a different playing style.

== Later life, death and legacy ==
By 1948, he was said to have been near death from the effects of tuberculosis.

Black Boy Shine died on March 28, 1952, in Sugar Land, Texas, from tuberculosis. He was 43 years old. He was buried in Stafford Colored Cemetery, Stafford, Texas.

He was individually named in the title of an essay, "From Bumble Bee Slim to Black Boy Shine: Nicknames of Blues Singers", written by David Evans and contained within the book, Ramblin' on My Mind: New Perspectives on the Blues.

In 1994, Black Boy Shine's full recorded output was released on CD by Document Records.

Blues musician Robert Shaw remembered Shine as "a smooth underworld figure and rated him the best of the Texas pianists."

== Discography ==
=== Singles ===
An alphabetical list of tracks recorded and released by Black Boy Shine:

- "Advice Blues" - Melotone - Recorded November 20, 1936
- "Advice Blues" - Vocalion - Recorded November 20, 1936
- "Back Home Blues" - Melotone - Recorded November 20, 1936
- "Bed And Breakfast Blues" - Vocalion - Recorded June 14, 1937
- "Brown House Blues" - Melotone - Recorded November 20, 1936
- "Business Woman Blues" - Vocalion - Recorded June 14, 1937
- "Coal Woman Blues" - Vocalion - Recorded June 14, 1937
- "Crazy Woman Blues" - Melotone - Recorded November 20, 1936
- "Crazy Woman Blues" - Vocalion - Recorded November 20, 1936
- "Dog House Blues" - Melotone - Recorded November 20, 1936
- "Gamblin' Jinx Blues" - Vocalion - Recorded June 15, 1937
- "Grey With Worry Blues" - Vocalion - Recorded June 14, 1937
- "Hobo Blues" - Vocalion - Recorded June 15, 1937
- "Ice Pick And Pistol Woman" - Vocalion - Recorded June 14, 1937
- "Lonesome Home Blues" - Vocalion - Recorded June 14, 1937
- "Married Man Blues" - Melotone - Recorded November 20, 1936
- "Sail On Little Girl" - Vocalion - Recorded June 14, 1937
- "Sugarland Blues" - Melotone - Recorded November 20, 1936
- "Wrong Doing Woman Blues" - Melotone - Recorded November 20, 1936
- "Wrong Doing Woman Blues" - Vocalion - Recorded November 20, 1936

=== Compilation albums ===
- 1994: Black Boy Shine & Black Ivory King 1936-1937, (Document) This collection had 18 sides recorded by Black Boy Shine, plus four more accredited to Black Ivory King.
- 1996: Leroy Carr and Black Boy Shine, (Document)

== See also ==
- List of Texas blues musicians
