= Michael Messer =

English singer, songwriter, slide guitarist, record producer, guitar designer

- Born: 28 February 1956 (age 70); Middlesex, England
- Genres: Acoustic blues; World; Electric blues
- Occupations: Singer, songwriter, slide guitarist, record producer
- Instruments: Slide guitar, lap steel guitar
- Years active: 1970s–present
- Labels: PT, Minidoka, Appaloosa, Scratch, Catfish Records, Cooking Vinyl, Knife Edge
- Website: Official website

Michael Messer (born 28 February 1956) is an English singer, songwriter, slide guitarist, recording artist, producer, guitar designer/manufacturer. He is noteworthy for his ability to combine acoustic and electric National slide and lap steel guitar into his playing style. The American magazine Spirit listed Messer as one of the greatest slide guitarists alongside Duane Allman and Ry Cooder.

Messer is included in the Virgin Encyclopaedia of the Blues. He also appeared in his own 'blues' episode of the BBC Television show, ZingZillas.

== Life and career ==
Messer was born in Middlesex, England. In his formative years, Messer played rock and roll, both with his two brothers and in a succession of local bands. He moved to the United States while in his early twenties and in Nashville, Tennessee, both met and heard the country music performances of Roy Acuff, Hank Snow and Johnny Cash. After returning to England, he purchased his own National steel guitar in 1979 and taught himself to play in a delta blues style. He performed solo and in several line-ups, before meeting Ed Genis in 1983. A working relationship with Genis was formed that has lasted to the present day. Through Genis and the blues circuit, Messer met the singer Mike Cooper, and the two of them provided studio work on Ian A. Anderson's 1984 album, The Continuous Preaching Blues.

He formed the Michael Messer Band in 1985, and this initially included Messer (guitar and vocals), Ed Genis (guitar and vocals), Andy Crowdy (bass and vocals) and Jeffro Robertson (drums). Their debut album was Diving Duck (1988). In 1989, Messer's band played on Ted Hawkins album, I Love You Too. Messer's second album, Slidedance, was released in 1990 and one year later, he won the UK Acoustic Blues Artist of the Year Award, sponsored by the BBC. He began to gain a reputation for incorporating different musical genres, as well as the blues, into his work. These included elements of Hawaiian slide guitar, reggae, jazz and King Sunny Adé's style of world music. Messer noted at that time that "If you look at what was happening in this country, and also what I was doing at that time, there's a big world music influence, which we were all very into – I was also, at that time, producing tracks with S.E. Rogie and with Ted Hawkins ... I intentionally made the album so it wasn't a blues album". A similar fusion was adopted on the follow-up, 1993's, Rhythm Oil. This was a joint collaboration between Messer, Terry Clarke and Jesse Taylor. The album's liner notes were written by Johnny Cash, an honour only shared with Bob Dylan (Nashville Skyline) and Kris Kristofferson. The Austin, Texas based music press named the collection, Import Album of the Year. The accompanying tour saw further experiment and innovation including the use of house and reggae styles, set against a more traditional cover version of Big Maceo Merriweather's "Worried Life Blues".

In 1995, Messer's next release, this time under his own name, MOONbeat, featured another amalgam of world music and blues, as well as DJ Louie Genis (the son of rhythm guitarist Ed) scratching old blues vinyl. In 1999, Messer travelled to Alberta to work with the Canadian guitarist and songwriter Doug Cox. One of Cox's songs, "Cold When I'm Dead", featuring Messer playing the electric slide guitar was used in Terry Gilliam's film, Tideland. Following Messer signing to Catfish Records in 2001, they released a compilation album of Messer's work entitled, King Guitar. The album received critical acclaim on both sides of the Atlantic, and reached number one in the US Living Blues chart. Second Mind (2002), his second album on Catfish, saw a guest appearance by Ruby Turner on backing vocals, with Genis junior again providing scratched overdubs. The album was named Best Blues Guitar Album at the 2003 International Guitar Federation Awards, and was warmly welcomed by the critics.

In 2005, Messer signed a new recording contract with Cooking Vinyl, who released Lucky Charms the following February. His live show with the Second Mind Band gained worldwide recognition. The National Debt CD, From the Horse's Mouth, to which Messer contributed was featured by Mark Lamarr on his BBC Radio 2 show. In November 2007, Messer and B. J. Cole performed their joint steel and slide guitar show at the International Festival of Guitar in Lancashire. The following year saw Messer and Ed Genis mark their 25th anniversary of performing as a duo, with a joint sell-out UK tour. In addition, Messer's own brand of resonator guitars were launched that August. In April and May 2009, Messer toured in the UK with Louisiana Red. In February 2013, Messer held a workshop on the Mississippi Delta and Chicago-style blues slide guitar at the Mahindra Blues Festival in India.

Messer has retained a global fan base for his virtuoso guitar playing, enjoying a thirty-year recording career. His most recent live band, known as Michael Messer's Mitra, fuses country blues with Hindustani classical music. The line-up includes the mohan veena player Manish Pingle, and the tabla player Gurdain Rayatt. Their debut album, Call of the Blues, was issued in February 2016. As well as his line of guitars, Messer has issued a series of slide and steel guitar instructional DVDs.

== Discography ==
=== Albums ===
| Year | Title | Record label | Credited to | Notes |
|---|---|---|---|---|
| 1988 | Diving Duck | PT Records | Michael Messer | |
| 1990 | Slidedance | Koch Records | Michael Messer Band | |
| 1993 | Rhythm Oil | PT Records | Terry Clarke, Michael Messer and Jesse Taylor | |
| 1995 | MOONbeat | Appaloosa Records | Michael Messer | |
| 1996 | National Avenue | Scratch Records | Michael Messer | |
| 2001 | King Guitar | Catfish Records | Michael Messer | Compilation album |
| 2002 | Second Mind | Catfish Records | Michael Messer | |
| 2006 | Lucky Charms | Cooking Vinyl | Michael Messer | |
| 2012 | National Avenue | Blues Boulevard | Michael Messer | Re-release |
| 2016 | Call of the Blues | Knife Edge Records | Michael Messer's Mitra | |
| 2023 | Mostly We Drive | Knife Edge Records | Michael Messer and Chaz Jankel | |

== See also ==
- List of electric blues musicians
