= Blackland, Austin, Texas =

Neighborhood of Austin, Texas

Coordinates: 30.280991°N 97.722097°W

Neighborhood map

Blackland is a historically black neighborhood on the east side of Austin, Texas, located north of Martin Luther King, Jr. Blvd, south of Manor Road, east of Interstate 35, and west of Chestnut Street.

The neighborhood was originally known as Blackland and was settled by Swedish immigrants, but evolved into a predominantly African-American neighborhood following the 1928 Austin city plan, which called for the relocation of non-white residents to the east side of the city. Up until the 1980s, the neighborhood was targeted for demolition to make way for an expansion of the University of Texas campus. In 1983, the Blackland Community Development Corporation was formed to build, purchase and maintain housing for low-income families and special populations.

== History ==
Blackland was originally a farming community founded and organized in the 1800s by Swedish immigrants who settled in the area due to the rich, dark soil that was good for growing crops. The neighborhood was originally known as "Blackland", named for the Blackland Prairie. By the turn of the 20th century, much of the farmland in the neighborhood was developed with streets and houses, most of which were built far apart on large lots. In 1928, the city of Austin unveiled its 1928 City Plan, which mandated that social services such as parks, schools and hospitals on the West side of town be closed to African-Americans. The plan created what city leaders referred to as the "Negro district" which included the Blackland Neighborhood and mush of downtown East Austin east of East Avenue (present-day Interstate 35). Additionally, many neighborhoods in North and West Austin adopted restrictive covenants that prevented home sales to non-whites. These measures drove many African-American families to East Austin neighborhoods, including Blackland.

In the 1930s, the neighborhood's growing African-American population constructed new housing, often filling in the gaps between the neighborhood's existing far-apart homes built in the 19th century. In the 1950s, blues musician Robert Shaw moved to the neighborhood and opened a grocery store and barbershop called the "Stop and Swat". By the 1960s, the neighborhood's name became known as "Blackland" and suffered from a lack of economic investment and disenfranchisement caused by racial discrimination.

In 1965, the Texas Legislature granted the University of Texas Board of Regents approval to use eminent domain to acquire land for expanding the university. In the Spring of 1965, the university began buying individual parcels of land to the north, south, and east of the existing campus, including in the Blackland neighborhood, in hopes of using the land to relocate the university's intramural fields, baseball field, tennis courts, and parking lots. Speculators bought much of the neighborhood's devalued property in order to sell it at a profit to the university. This led to cheaper rent for residents at the expense of deteriorating housing conditions. The University Board of Regents focused on expansion eastward, as the east side's lower property values would lower the cost of acquisition. During the talks of annexation, the university and the City of Austin referred to Blackland neighborhood as the "Winn Tract" (named after an elementary school in the area), the "University East Project", or the Eastern Renewal Area".

In 1980, the university announced plans to annex all the land between I-35 and Chicon Street, nearly half of the Blackland neighborhood. In 1981, the Blackland Neighborhood Association was formed to protect the Blackland residents' property rights. The neighborhood association led by Katherine Pool, Charlie Smith and Bo McCarver founded the Blackland Community Development Corporation (CDC) in 1983. Following 12 years of negotiations, the Blackland CDC and the university reached a compromise, which allowed the university to annex the land between I-35 and Leona Street to build the Red and Charline McCombs Field and other auxiliary buildings; at the same time, the university divested all of its previously acquired property east of Leona Street back to the Blackland CDC.
