= Roosevelt Williams =

American blues pianist (1903-1996)

- Also known as: Grey Ghost
- Born: Roosevelt Thomas Williams; December 7, 1903; Bastrop, Texas, United States
- Died: July 17, 1996 (aged 92) Austin, Texas, United States
- Genres: Blues
- Instrument: Piano

Roosevelt Thomas "Grey Ghost" Williams (December 7, 1903 – July 17, 1996) was an American blues pianist, with a 70-year career spanning from the 1920s through the 1990s. He was part of the "Santa Fe Group", a loose ensemble of black blues pianists who played in the many juke joints abutting the Atchison, Topeka and Santa Fe Railway.

== History ==
"He says he got the name Grey Ghost back when he was hired to play in various small towns. Someone would meet every arriving train or bus, but Williams was never aboard--yet mysteriously he would show up in time to perform. "They said like a ghost I come up out of the ground, and then I was gone," he grinned. "I had come and gone by freight train. I would put overalls over my suit and tie, and that's the way I traveled".

Williams was born in Bastrop, Texas, United States, and received only basic musical training when he was a teenager. He traveled to the area dances and roadhouses by riding empty boxcars. He would seem to appear out of nowhere and then disappear immediately after performing, which earned him the nickname "Grey Ghost." In this fashion Grey Ghost was part of the "Santa Fe Group", a loose ensemble of black blues pianists who played in the many juke joints abutting the Atchison, Topeka and Santa Fe Railway.

In 1940, author William A. Owens made a live recording of Williams singing "Hitler Blues," a song written by Williams. The song received mention in Time and was broadcast by BBC Radio on a program hosted by Alistair Cooke in 1940 about the American musical response to World War II. This did not make Williams famous, but he became a regular in nightclubs like the Victory Grill and other venues that catered to the African-American community during racial segregation in the United States.

In 1965, archivist Tary Owens (1942–2003) recorded several Grey Ghost songs. After decades of relative obscurity, Owens tracked down Grey Ghost again in the mid-1980s. Williams had tired of traveling and settled in Austin and began driving a school bus for the Austin Independent School District. Williams was long retired, but Owens not only issued the 1965 recordings on his Catfish Records label in 1987, but also convinced Williams, now 84, to start playing again and introduced him to a new generation of blues fans. Owens arranged for Williams to make a CD of new recordings at the age of 89. The resulting eponymous solo album was released on October 10, 1992, on Owens' Spindletop label.

The City of Austin proclaimed December 7, 1987, as Grey Ghost Day, and he was inducted into the Austin Music Hall of Fame in 1988.

Williams performed regularly until the time of his death in Austin at the age of 92.
