= Smokey Hogg =

American blues musician (1914–1960)

- Born: Andrew Hogg; January 27, 1914; Westconnie, Texas, United States
- Died: May 1, 1960 (aged 46) McKinney, Texas, United States
- Genres: Texas blues, country blues
- Occupation: Musician
- Instrument: Guitar
- Years active: 1930s–1950s
- Labels: Decca, Modern, Specialty, Federal, Imperial, Recorded In Hollywood, Meteor

Andrew "Smokey" Hogg (January 27, 1914 – May 1, 1960) was an American post-war Texas blues and country blues musician.

== Life and career ==
Hogg was born near Westconnie, Texas, and grew up on a farm. He was taught to play the guitar by his father, Frank Hogg. While still in his teens he teamed up with the slide guitarist and vocalist B. K. Turner, also known as Black Ace, and the pair travelled together, playing a circuit of turpentine and logging camps, country dance halls and juke joints around Kilgore, Tyler, Greenville and Palestine, in East Texas.

In 1937, Decca Records brought Hogg and Black Ace to Chicago to record. Hogg's first record, "Family Trouble Blues" backed with "Kind Hearted Blues", was released under the name of Andrew Hogg. It was an isolated occurrence — he did not make it back into a recording studio for over a decade. By the early 1940s, Hogg was married and making a good living busking around the Deep Ellum area of Dallas, Texas.

Hogg was drafted in the mid-1940s. After a brief spell with the U.S. military, he continued working in the Dallas area, where he was becoming well known. In 1947 he came to the attention of Herbert T. Rippa Sr., the head of the Dallas-based record label Bluebonnet Records, who recorded several sides with him and leased the masters to Modern Records.

The first release on Modern was the Big Bill Broonzy song "Too Many Drivers". It sold well enough that Modern brought Hogg to Los Angeles to cut more sides with their team of studio musicians. These songs included his two biggest hits, "Long Tall Mama" in 1948 and another Broonzy tune, "Little School Girl." In January 1950, "Little School Girl" reached number 5 on the Billboard Retail R&B chart and number 9 on the Most Played Juke Box R&B chart.

His two-part "Penitentiary Blues" (1952) was a remake of the prison song "Ain't No More Cane on the Brazos". which was also recorded by Bob Dylan and the Band in 2005

Hogg's style was influenced by Broonzy, Peetie Wheatstraw and Black Ace. His playing tended to be rhythmically inconsistent; author and critic Peter Guralnick observed that “there is never any beat as such to Smokey Hogg’s music, though a pulse can sometimes be detected”.This idiosyncratic timing relied on a fluid bar count where Hogg would spontaneously extend vocal lines, leaving his backing studio musicians to improvisational tracking.

His music was popular with record buyers in the South during the late 1940s and early 1950s, and he continued to work and record until the end of the 1950s.

He died in McKinney, Texas in 1960 of a haemorrhaging ulcer commonly known as a bleeding ulcer, at the age of 46.

== Relatives and others ==
Hogg was reputed to be a cousin of Lightnin' Hopkins and to be distantly related to Alger "Texas" Alexander, but both claims are ambiguous.

Hogg's cousin John Hogg was also a blues musician; he recorded for Mercury Records in 1951.

He is not to be confused with Willie "Smokey" Hogg, a musician based in New York City in the 1960s.

== Selected discography ==
- Angels in Harlem (Ace CDCHD-419; Specialty SPCD-7020, 1992)
- Deep Ellum Rambler (Ace CDCHD-780, 2000)
- Serve it to the Right (The Combo and Modern Recordings 1947–52) (Ace CDCHD-866, 2002)
- Midnight Blues (Ace CDCHD-1019, 2004)
- Who's Heah! – Selected Singles 1947–1954 (Jasmine JASMCD-3144, 2020)
- The Andrew "Smokey" Hogg Collection 1937–57 (Acrobat ADDCD-3351, 2020) 2-CD
- The Texas Blues of Smokey Hogg (Ace CDCHD-1588, 2021)

== See also ==
- List of blues musicians
- List of Texas blues musicians
- List of electric blues musicians
