= Lester Williams (musician) =

American guitarist, singer and songwriter

- Texas Troubadour album cover

Background information
- Born: June 24, 1920; Groveton, Texas, United States
- Died: November 13, 1990 (aged 70) Houston, Texas, United States
- Genres: Texas blues, electric blues
- Occupations: Guitarist, singer, songwriter
- Instruments: Guitar, vocals
- Years active: 1949–1990

Lester B. Williams (June 24, 1920 – November 13, 1990) was an American Texas blues and electric blues guitarist, singer and songwriter. He is best known for his song "Winter Time Blues" and "I Can't Lose with the Stuff I Use". His main influence was T-Bone Walker.

Williams released several singles in the 1950s. His recording career lasted from 1949 to 1956, but he remained a stalwart of the Houston blues circuit for decades.

== Life and career ==
Williams was born in Groveton, Texas. When he was a young boy his family relocated to Houston. After serving in World War II, Williams sang at Houston's Eldorado Ballroom, but quit and enrolled at the New England Conservatory in Boston, Massachusetts, to study piano and voice. He did not graduate, and he returned to Houston, where he taught himself to play the guitar and started to write songs. Walker's influence inspired Williams, who said to himself, "I could learn to play guitar and pull in some of that money that T-Bone made". Having formed his own group in 1949, he wrote "Winter Time Blues", which came from his own experience when his wife and daughter traveled to Los Angeles for the summer, leaving him to contemplate the winter alone. The song included the lyric "Winter without your baby, you might as well be dead".

He signed a recording contract with Macy's Recordings, and Steve Poncio produced "Winter Time Blues" which was a regional hit. His next few releases did not fare well commercially and, by 1951, Williams had moved to Specialty Records. His first disc for them was his biggest success, "I Can't Lose with the Stuff I Use" (1952). His notability rose to the extent that he appeared in February 1953 at Carnegie Hall, in New York City, on a bill that included Dinah Washington, Billy Eckstine and Nat King Cole. The song "I Can't Lose with the Stuff I Use" was covered a decade later by B.B. King.

His success was short-lived, as subsequent releases did not sell well. By 1954, Williams was performing regularly on the Houston radio station KLVL, and he began a constant touring regime across the South. Additional singles were released by Duke and by Imperial, the latter in 1956.

For the ensuing decades, Williams continued to perform around Houston and beyond. He undertook a tour of Europe in 1986.

Williams died in November 1990, in Houston, at the age of 70.

== Discography ==
=== Compilation albums ===
Year	Title	Record label
1993	The Godfather of Blues	Collectables Records
1993	I Can't Lose with the Stuff I Use	Specialty Records
1995	Texas Troubadour	Ace Records

== See also ==
- List of electric blues musicians
- List of Texas blues musicians
