= Tanimura & Antle =

American vegetable company

- Company type: Private
- Founded: 1982 as Tanimura & Antle
- Founders: George Tanimura, Bob Antle
- Headquarters: Spreckels, California, USA
- Key people: Scott Grabau, President & CEO
- Products: Lettuce, Broccoli, Cauliflower, other Vegetables
- Website: www.taproduce.com

Tanimura & Antle is a US grower and seller of conventional and organic fresh lettuce, broccoli, cauliflower and other vegetables. It is a family business that has been in the Tanimura and Antle families since its founding in 1982.

== History ==
George Tanimura was born in San Juan Bautista, California, on July 2, 1915. He was the oldest of twelve siblings, and began working in his family's Castroville, California, iceberg lettuce fields while in grade school. He took over as the head of his family and its business as a teenager when his father died in the midst of the Great Depression. He and his brothers built a large business. Then they lost all their land and property when he and other family members were sent to an Arizonan internment camp during World War II due to his Japanese ancestry, even as his brothers fought for the U.S. overseas. It was there that he met and married his wife.

Following the war, Tanimura and his brothers rebuilt the family business, starting as field laborers on small plots of land in Gilroy, California. They saved enough to buy an acre of land and rebuilt their business. By the late 1940s, Tanimura and his brothers began working with grower-shipper Bud Antle, and eventually began growing exclusively for that company.

Bud Antle, born in 1914, began farming lettuce in the Salinas Valley under the Bud Antle brand name. In 1972, after Bud Antle died at age 58, Bud's son Bob became chief executive officer of the Antle businesses. Following six years of further development, the Antle businesses merged with Castle & Cooke (now Dole Food Co. Inc.) and he joined its upper management. Bob served on the Castle & Cooke board of directors until 1982. After his departure in 1982, Bob, along with his sons, Rick and Mike, formed Tanimura & Antle with George Tanimura and his brothers, Charlie, Johnny, Tommy, and Bob, and nephews Gary and Keith. George and Bob Tanimura and Bob Antle became co-chairmen of the board. With the death of Bob Antle, his son Rick Antle assumed the position of CEO.

Rick Antle was President of Tanimura & Antle since its inception, and became CEO in 2003. He was also associated with Salad Time LLC, Earthbound Farm, LLC, Ready Pac Produce, Inc., Dulcinea Farms LLC and Pacific Ag Rentals. Rick Antle was a graduate of California Polytechnic State University, San Luis Obispo, and was designated a Distinguished Alumnus by the University's Department of Agriculture. He died after a short illness on April 14, 2018 and was succeeded as CEO by Scott Grabau.

In 2015, to address an acute shortage of farm workers, Tanimura & Antle embarked on a program to provide employee housing for its workers, beginning with a $17 million expenditure for new housing for year-round employees at the old company town of Spreckels. Tanimura & Antle is pursuing reductions in labor in the fields through the use of computerized/automated planting, thinning and weeding equipment.

In February 2017, Tanimura & Antle launched an Employee Stock Ownership Plan (ESOP), allowing employees to become partial owners of the company.

== Operations ==
Tanimura & Antle owns 27,000 acres and farms 40,000 acres with its partners annually throughout its growing locations in California and Arizona. A hydroponic operation is located in Tennessee. Tanimura & Antle focuses on salad produce, primarily lettuce, celery, broccoli, cauliflower, and green onions.

== Library ==
The Tanimura & Antle Family Memorial Library on the California State University, Monterey Bay campus is a donation from Bob Antle. The library serves as the centerpiece for this developing campus on the former grounds of Fort Ord. It serves as the social and intellectual hub of the university.
