= Black Ivory King =

- Born: David Alexander; November 25, 1899; Stamps, Arkansas, U.S.
- Died: November 17, 1947 (aged 47) Los Angeles, California, U.S.
- Genres: Blues, boogie-woogie
- Occupations: Pianist, singer, songwriter
- Instruments: Piano, vocals
- Years active: 1930s–1940s
- Label: Decca Records

David Alexander (November 25, 1899 – November 17, 1947) known as Black Ivory King was an American blues and boogie-woogie pianist, best known for his original version of the then popular train blues song, "The Flying Crow".

== Life and career ==
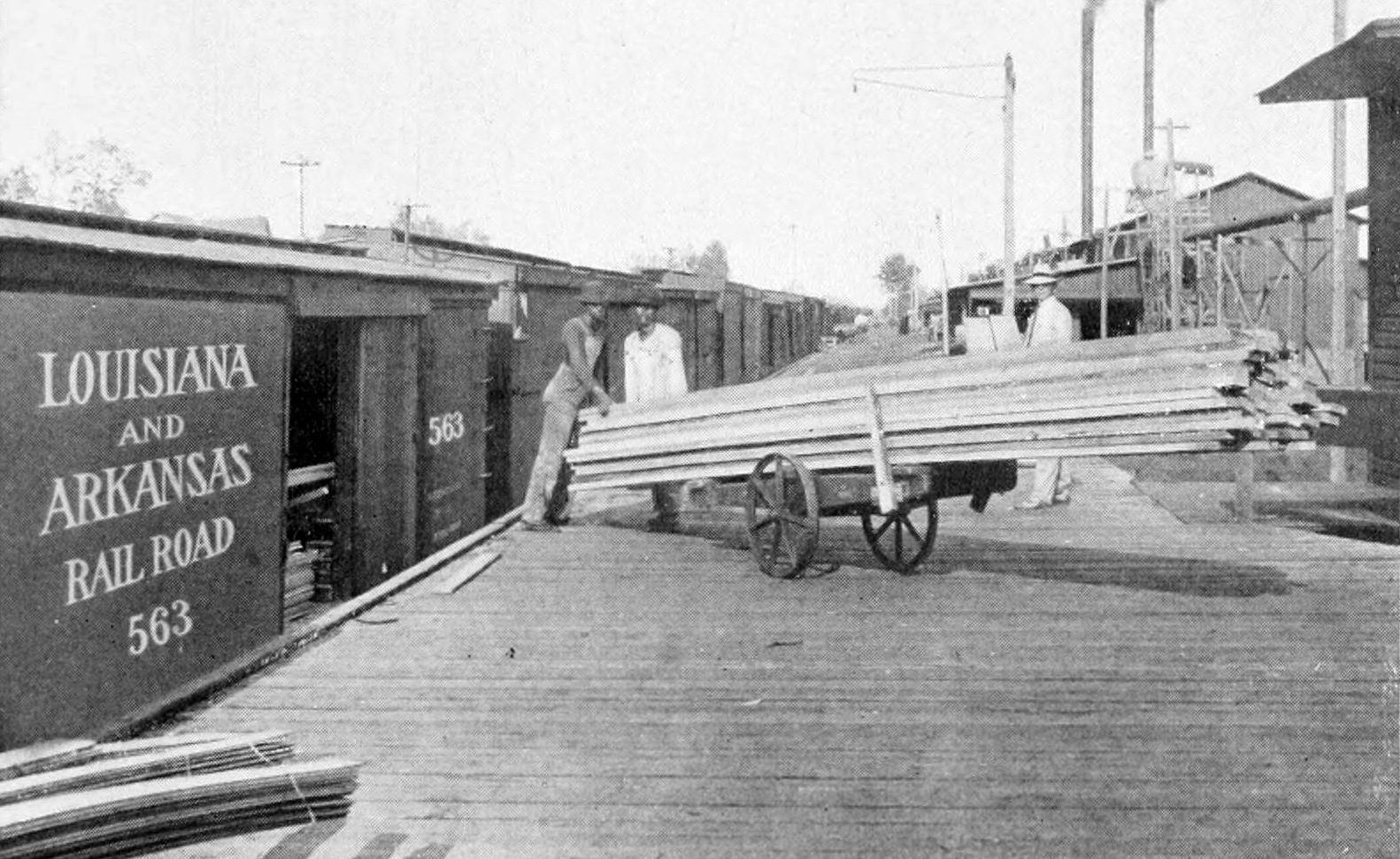
Loading lumber in Stamps, Arkansas, 1904

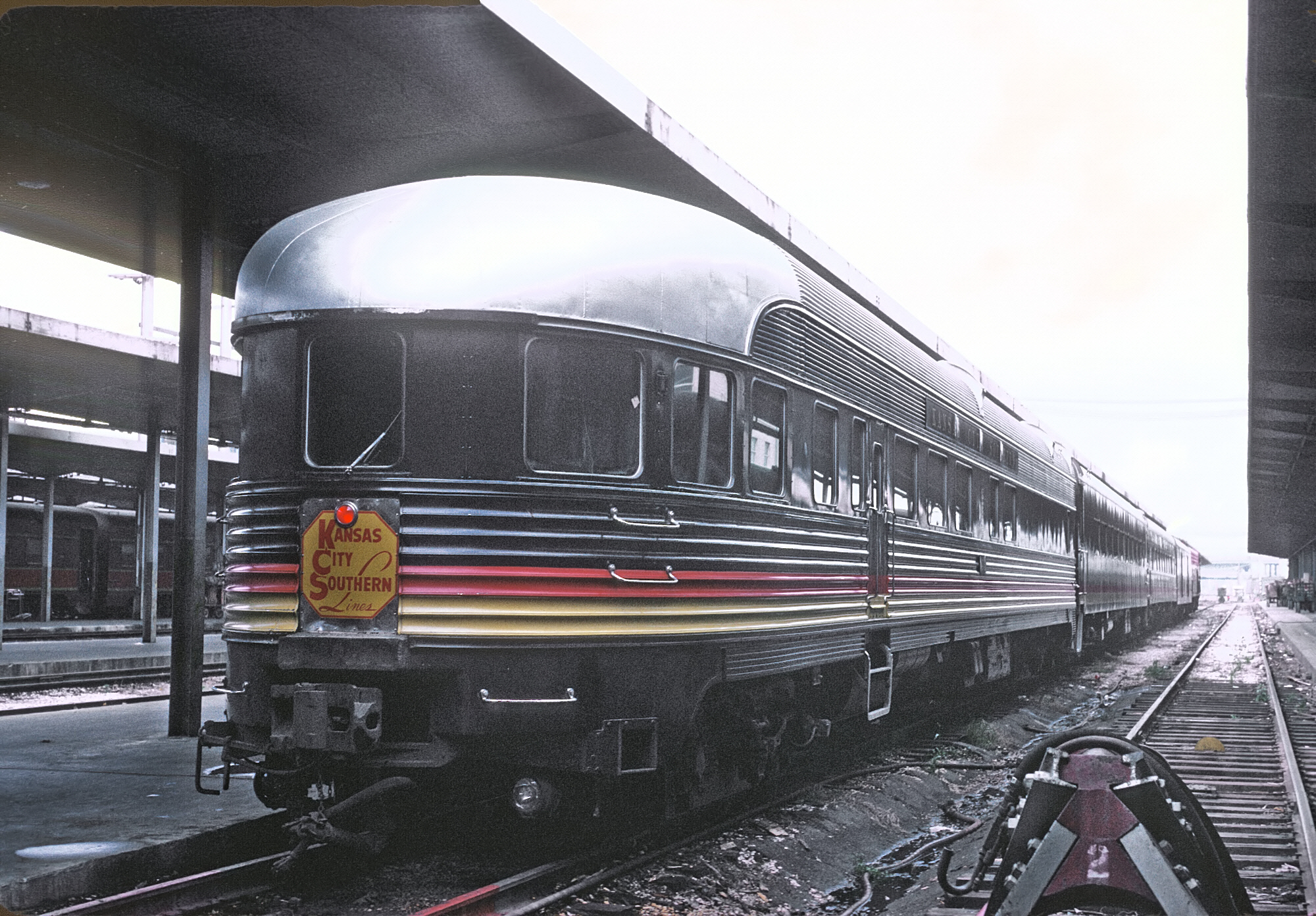
Louisiana and Arkansas Railway's Train 10, The Flying Crow, at New Orleans Union Terminal on November 22, 1967.

He was born in Stamps, Arkansas, and his birthplace later received a mention in one of his own recordings. Black Ivory King later relocated to Shreveport, Louisiana, although the exact date of his move is not known. A common link between those locations was the Louisiana and Arkansas Railway, which he traveled on when leaving Shreveport. His best known song was "The Flying Crow", and it included a poetic version of the train timetable between Port Arthur, Texas, and Kansas City, Missouri. The railroad track went on to New Orleans. "The Flying Crow" became a requested tune for Shreveport area musicians to play, with evidence that Black Ivory King wrote and recorded the definitive version.

Black Ivory King as a nickname came from his known preference for playing the black keys on the piano. The likely explanation being that he sometimes worked within a band set-up, and horn players favour using the keys of A, A♭, and E♭. Three of King's recordings were in those keys. Black Ivory King recorded only four songs for Decca Records, which were waxed in Dallas, Texas, on February 15, 1937. One of those sides was "Working for The PWA", an updated version of the earlier track, "Red Cross Store Blues". Black Ivory King must have been aware of part of Blind Lemon Jefferson's work, as his recording of "Match Box Blues" included some of the latter musician's verses.

Following his brief recording session, Black Ivory King moved on again eventually settling in Los Angeles. Little is known of his existence thereafter, although in February 1942 his draft card showed him as being 5'6 foot, and weighing 147 pounds. After the war he worked as a musician in the Tip Top Bar Room in Los Angeles.

Black Ivory King died on November 17, 1947, due to pulmonary disease, indicating he had suffered from tuberculosis.

== Legacy ==
Black Ivory King's piano playing was linked to the "Santa Fe Group", named after touring musicians utilising the Santa Fe, Texas, freight trains.

The blues musician Dave Alexander (1938–2012) was named for his father's best friend, David Alexander (Black Ivory King).

The lyrics to "The Flying Crow" were printed in a publication released in 1993.

== Discography ==
=== 78rpm singles ===
- "Gingham Dress (Alexander Blues)" / "Match Box Blues" (Decca, 1937)
- "The Flying Crow" / "Working for The PWA" (Decca, 1937)

=== Compilation album ===
- 1994: Black Boy Shine & Black Ivory King 1936-1937, (Document) (This collection had 18 sides recorded by Black Boy Shine, plus four accredited to Black Ivory King).

== See also ==
- List of boogie woogie musicians
