= Catfish Records =

British independent record label

Catfish Records was a UK independent record label, initially devoted to reissuing blues records, mostly from the era of 78 rpm records. Khaled Abdullah and Russell Beecher, concentrated on country blues and delta blues during the heyday of the late 1920s and the early 1930s, with forays into later eras up to the arrival of rhythm and blues in the late 1940s and electric Chicago blues in the early 1950s. Their roster included Charley Patton, Son House, Tommy Johnson, Bukka White, and the Mississippi Sheiks. These selected releases generally featured the most artistically meritorious or historically relevant recordings of any of the musicians reissued. At the time, the label was particularly noted for the high quality of its digital restorations of pre-war blues recordings.

The company latterly issued a number of historical recordings in other genres including jazz, country and bluegrass, but also featured releases from several contemporary artists including Michael Messer, Steve Earle, Bap Kennedy, Townes Van Zandt and Terry Clarke. The company also handled DVD releases for projects including Bill Wyman's Blues Odyssey, and the award-winning alt country documentary, Heartworn Highways.

== Bibliography ==
- Komara, Edward M., ed. (2006). Encyclopedia of the blues. Routledge. p. 188. ISBN 978-0-415-92699-7. "Rye, Howard : Catfish Records"
