= Ray Sharpe =

American singer-songwriter

- Born: Edward Ray Sharpe; February 8, 1938 (age 88); Fort Worth, Texas, United States
- Genres: Rockabilly; rock and roll; rhythm and blues
- Occupations: Musician, songwriter
- Instruments: Vocals, guitar
- Years active: 1956–present

Edward Ray Sharpe (born February 8, 1938) is an American singer, guitarist, and songwriter. His best-known single was "Linda Lu". Sharpe was described by one record producer as "the greatest white-sounding black dude ever".

== Background ==
Born in Fort Worth, Texas, Sharpe grew up influenced by country as well as blues music. He learned guitar, influenced by Chuck Berry records, and in 1956 formed his own trio, Ray Sharpe and the Blues Whalers, with Raydell Reese (piano) and Cornelius Bell (drums), and they became popular playing rock and roll in Fort Worth clubs. His recording career started in Phoenix, Arizona in April 1958, when Lee Hazlewood produced his single, "That's the Way I Feel" / "Oh, My Baby's Gone".

== "Linda Lu" ==
His second record, "Linda Lu" / "Monkey's Uncle" – both sides written by Sharpe, produced by Hazlewood, and featuring Duane Eddy and Sharpe on guitar, Al Casey on rhythm guitar – was much more successful. Recorded in May 1959, it reached No. 46 on the Billboard Hot 100 that year. Following its success, Sharpe appeared on American Bandstand and toured with a Dick Clark rock and roll package that also included LaVern Baker, Duane Eddy and The Coasters. "Linda Lu" has subsequently been covered by many artists, including the Rolling Stones, The Kingsmen, Johnny Kidd and the Pirates, Flying Burrito Brothers, and Tom Jones.

== Later work ==
Subsequent single releases on a variety of record labels, including Hazlewood's own Trey label, were less successful. These included recordings made in 1966 with King Curtis, which featured Jimi Hendrix on guitar. However, Sharpe's songs have been recorded by acts ranging from Roy Head and the Traits to Neil Young and J. B. Hutto, and he has continued to release records, as well as performing regularly in the Fort Worth area.
