= D'Arrigo Brothers =

American food company

- Type: Private
- Founded: 1923 as D'Arrigo Brothers
- Founders: Andrea D'Arrigo, Stefano D'Arrigo, Stephen D'Arrigo
- Headquarters: Spreckels, California, USA
- Key people: John D'Arrigo, CEO Chad Amaral, V.P. Marketing
- Products: Lettuce, Broccoli, Cauliflower, other Vegetables
- Website: www.andyboy.com

D'Arrigo Brothers is a California-based grower and seller of fresh lettuce, broccoli, broccoli rabe (rapini), cauliflower and other vegetables, as well as cactus pear. It is a family business that has been in the D'Arrigo brothers' families since its founding in 1923. It is composed of 3 D'Arrigo Brothers entities, respectively headquartered in Boston, New York City, and Spreckels, California.

== History ==
Brothers Andrea and Stefano D’Arrigo emigrated from Sicily to the United States in 1904 and 1911, respectively. They both obtained engineering degrees and served during World War I before starting their produce business. In 1923 the two brothers established their first business in Boston, bringing fresh produce from around the country to the Boston market. While on a trip to California in 1925, Stefano D’Arrigo noted the abundance of land perfect for growing produce near what is now San Jose, California With a packet of broccoli seeds from Sicily, the brothers established a growing operation on the West Coast. That operation is now headquartered in Spreckels, California 50 miles south of San Jose in the Salinas Valley, sometimes called the Salad Bowl of the World.

The brothers developed a refrigeration system to keep produce fresh during cross-country train trips, and became the first company to ship fresh fruits and vegetables from California to the East Coast of the United States, year-round. This was unprecedented at the time, and initiated the modern fresh produce industry. The company trademarked "Andy Boy" in 1927 as the first-ever brand of fresh vegetables in the United States. After many years in Boston, the D’Arrigo brothers opened their New York operation in 1948 with Andrea's oldest son, Stephen, in charge.

Like all of the other major agribusinesses of the Salinas Valley, D'Arrigo Brothers have had their share of difficulties with labor shortages and strikes.

== Operations ==
The Boston and New York operations serve as distribution centers for fresh produce. The California operation serves as both a growing operation with over 30,000 acres under cultivation, and a distribution center, with approximately 3,000 employees.

In August 2006 D'Arrigo Brothers opened a new headquarters facility that would house cooling, shipping, business and administrative operations all under one roof.

In 2011 D'Arrigo Brothers introduced four new, improved varieties of cactus pears— orange, red, purple and green — that are firmer, sweeter and juicier than the traditional variety. The climate of the Santa Clara Valley and Salinas Valley, where they grow their cactus pear, is ideally suited for these unusual fruits.

In December 2015, 'Andy Boy' D'Arrigo, the namesake of their premier brand, retired.

In 2016, D'Arrigo Brothers partnered with Driscoll's berry growers to use the newly expanding D'Arrigo cooler facility for Driscoll's berries.

In 2017 D’Arrigo Brothers initiated a 2.2 megawatt solar power system that allows them to lower utility bills by about $1 million annually. This has expanded in 2018 by an additional 1.1 megawatts, and in mid-2018 should increase to a total of 5.5 megawatts.

== D'Arrigo Clinic ==
In July 2012 the Natividad Medical Center launched D’Arrigo Family Specialty Services to benefit a patient population that includes many farmworkers, based on a donation from the D'Arrigo Brothers.
