= Robert Shaw (blues musician) =

- Born: August 9, 1908; Stafford, Texas, United States
- Died: May 18, 1985 (aged 76); Austin, Texas, United States
- Genres: Blues, boogie-woogie
- Occupations: Pianist, singer, songwriter
- Instruments: Piano, vocals
- Years active: Early 1930s–1985
- Label: Arhoolie

Robert Shaw (August 9, 1908 – May 18, 1985) was an American blues and boogie-woogie pianist, best known for his 1963 album, The Ma Grinder.

== Early life ==
Shaw was born in Stafford, Texas, the son of farm owners Jesse and Hettie Shaw, who owned a cattle ranch there. The family also owned a Steinway grand piano, and his sisters had lessons in playing, but Shaw's father was against allowing his son to learn the instrument.

Shaw worked with his father on the family's ranch, and played the piano whenever his family was out; the first song he learned was "Aggravatin' Papa Don't You Try to Two-Time Me." In adolescence, Shaw travelled to Houston to listen to jazz musicians, and at nearby roadhouses. He then found a piano teacher and paid for lessons with his earnings.

== Career ==
He learned a barrelhouse style of playing from musicians in the Fourth Ward, Houston.

In the 1920s Shaw was part of the "Santa Fe Group", named after touring musicians utilising the Santa Fe freight trains.

Although he played in Chicago, Shaw mainly restricted himself to Texas, performing as a soloist in the clubs and roadhouses of Sugarland, Richmond, Kingsville, Houston and Dallas. In 1930, at the height of the Kilgore oil boom, Shaw played there. Two years later he traveled to Kansas City, Kansas, to perform. In 1933 he hosted a radio show in Oklahoma City. He relocated to Texas, first to Fort Worth and then to Austin. Here he settled down and took up residence in Austin's Blackland neighborhood, owning a grocery store known as the Stop and Swat.

In 1963, Shaw recorded an album, Texas Barrelhouse Piano, which was produced by Robert "Mack" McCormick and released by McCormick's Almanac Book and Recording Company. Arhoolie Records later reissued the LP under the title The Ma Grinder. The album contained old favourites such as "The Ma Grinder", "The Cows" and "Whores Is Funky", some of them too risque to have been issued previously.

In 1967, seven years before his retirement from the grocery trade, Shaw recommenced concert playing. With the revival of his career, he played at the Kerrville Folk Festival, overseas in Amsterdam, Frankfurt, and at the Berlin Jazz Festival; as well as the Smithsonian Institution's American Folk Life Festival, the World's Fair Expo in Canada, and the New Orleans Jazz & Heritage Festival. He played with the Preservation Hall Jazz Band at the 1973 Austin Aqua Festival, and continued to perform in the United States and in Europe intermittently in the 1970s, turning up unexpectedly in California in 1981 to help Strachwitz celebrate Arhoolie's 20th anniversary.

== Personal life ==
Shaw married Martha Landrum in December 1939. They had no children. However, Shaw had previously been married, and had a daughter, Verna Mae, and a son, William. For many years Shaw ran his grocery in Austin in partnership with Martha, and in 1962 he was named the black businessman of the year in Austin.

Shaw died of a heart attack in Austin, on May 16, 1985, and was interred at the Capital Memorial Gardens. Two weeks after his death, the Texas State Senate passed a resolution in honor of his contribution to the state's musical heritage.

== Discography ==
- The Ma Grinder (1963), Arhoolie
  - "Ma Grinder" (Shaw), 4:13
  - "Hattie Green", 4:41
  - "Fives", 4:10
  - "Black Gal", 8:46
  - "Put Me in the Alley" (Shaw, Smith), 4:31
  - "Groceries on My Shelf (Piggly Wiggly)", 4:00
  - "The Clinton", 3:39
  - "People, People", 5:57
  - "The Cows" (Shaw, Shaw), 4:01
  - "Whores Is Funky", 3:19
  - "Here I Come with My Dirty, Dirty Duckings On", 3:58
- Texas Barrelhouse Piano (1980), Arhoolie

== Legacy ==
The music journalist Bill Dahl described "The Cows", a composition written and recorded by Shaw, as "a piece of incredible complexity that would wilt anything less than a legitimate ivories master." Tony Russell, in his book The Blues: From Robert Johnson to Robert Cray, cited The Ma Grinder as "offering a uniquely clear view of a style and repertoire that almost escaped preservation."

== See also ==
- List of blues musicians
- List of boogie woogie musicians

== Bibliography ==
- Alan B. Govenar, Meeting the Blues (Dallas: Taylor Publishing Co., 1988), ISBN 978-0878336234
- Robert Springer, "Being Yourself Is More Than Tryin' to Be Somebody Else," Blues Unlimited, March–April 1978. Vertical Files, Austin History Center. Vertical Files, Center for American History, University of Texas at Austin.
