= Texas blues =

Music genre

- Stylistic origins: Blues; country blues; swing; jazz
- Cultural origins: c. 1900s, Texas, U.S.

Other topics
- Blues rock, Southern rock

Texas blues is blues music that developed in Texas through hubs like Dallas, Houston, and Austin. As a regional style, its original form was characterized by jazz and swing influences. Later examples are often closer to blues rock and Southern rock.

== History ==
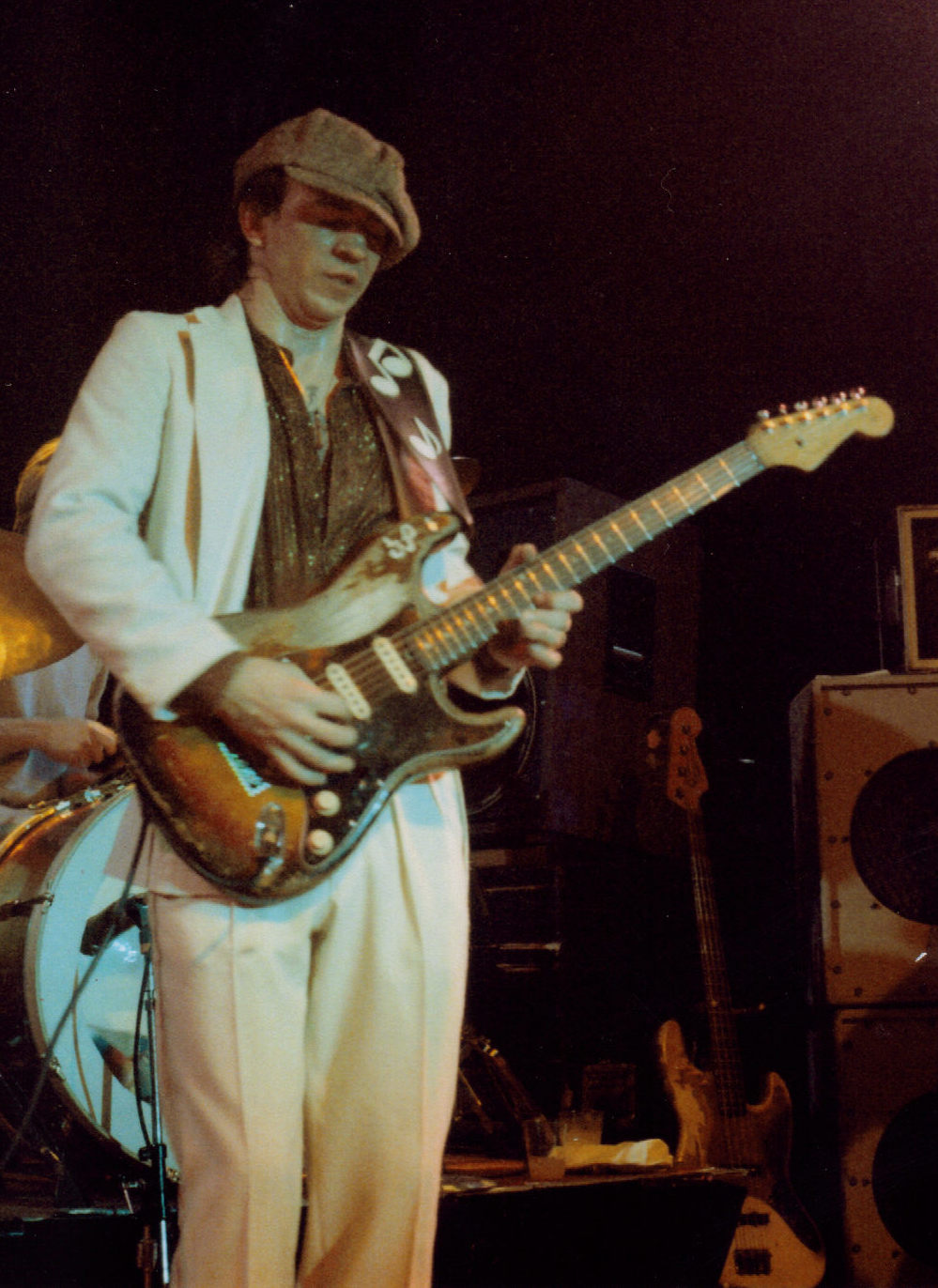
Stevie Ray Vaughan was the most prominent figure in one style of Texas electric blues in the late 20th century

Texas blues began to appear in the early 1900s among African Americans who worked in oilfields, ranches and lumber camps. The sound of this genre was influenced by certain African musical techniques that were present in the music of enslaved populations in the South. One example of this is the use of call-and-response that is seen throughout work songs and the blues. In the 1920s, Blind Lemon Jefferson innovated the style by using jazz-like improvisation and single string accompaniment on a guitar; Jefferson's influence defined the field and inspired later performers. Because of his contributions to the style and influence on other musicians, some credit Jefferson as the founder of Texas blues. During the Great Depression in the 1930s, many bluesmen moved to cities including Galveston, San Antonio, Houston and Dallas. It was from these urban centers that a new wave of popular performers appeared, including slide guitarist and gospel singer Blind Willie Johnson. Future bluesmen such as Lightnin' Hopkins, Lil' Son Jackson, and T-Bone Walker were influenced by these developments. Robert Johnson's two recording sessions both took place in Texas, although he was from Mississippi.

T-Bone Walker relocated to Los Angeles to record his most influential work in the 1940s. His swing-influenced backing and lead guitar sound became an influential part of the electric blues. It was T-Bone Walker, B.B. King once said, who “really started me to want to play the blues. I can still hear T-Bone in my mind today, from that first record I heard, ‘Stormy Monday.’ He was the first electric guitar player I heard on record. He made me so that I knew I just had to go out and get an electric guitar.” He also influenced Goree Carter, whose "Rock Awhile" (1949) featured an over-driven electric guitar style and has been cited as a strong contender for the "first rock and roll record" title.

The state's R&B recording industry was based in Houston with labels such as Duke/Peacock, which in the 1950s provided a base for artists who would later pursue the electric Texas blues sound, including Johnny Copeland and Albert Collins. Freddie King, a major influence on electric blues, was born in Texas, but moved to Chicago as a teenager. His instrumental number "Hide Away" (1961), was emulated by British blues artists including Eric Clapton.

In the late 1960s and early 1970s the Texas Blues scene began to flourish, influenced by country music and blues rock, particularly in the clubs of Austin. The diverse style often featured instruments such as keyboards and horns with emphasis on guitar soloing. The most prominent artists to emerge in this era were the brothers Johnny and Edgar Winter, who combined traditional and southern styles. In the 1970s, Jimmie Vaughan formed the Fabulous Thunderbirds and in the 1980s his brother Stevie Ray Vaughan broke through to mainstream success with his virtuoso guitar playing, as did ZZ Top with their brand of Southern rock.

== Geography ==
=== Dallas ===
The city of Dallas was a place that blues artists across the South would travel to. This is in large part due to the high number of performance and recording opportunities in the city. The area known as Deep Ellum, also known as Central Track for its location near the Houston and Texas Central tracks, was a large draw for those looking to perform blues music. The area was a predominantly African American neighborhood that hosted well-known blues musicians such as Blind Lemon Jefferson, Aaron "T-Bone" Walker, and Huddie "Lead Belly" Ledbetter. The neighborhood held multiple theaters where both touring and local artists would perform. One such theater was the Rose Room, previously known as the Rose Ballroom, where Jimmy Nelson, Aaron "T-Bone" Walker, and Zuzu Bollin performed.

=== Houston ===
The city of Houston acted as a destination for people seeking to perform the blues in part because it held the recording studio Duke/Peacock records. Peacock Records, an African American owned recording studio, was founded in Houston in 1949 and later merged with Duke records in 1952. A notable artist to come out of the record label was an African American woman named Willie Mae "Big Mama" Thornton, the original singer of the song "Hound Dog" which was later performed by Elvis Presley. Even prior to the creation of Peacock records, there were performance and learning opportunities in the blues. The Third, Fourth, and Fifth wards of Houston were the segregated neighborhoods of Houston that were occupied by African Americans. In each of these wards, there were blues artists developing. The Third Ward hosted Sam "Lightnin'" Hopkins, the Fourth hosted the Santa Fe Group, and the Fifth hosted multiple members of the George W. Thomas family. Each of these wards developed unique techniques and sounds that contributed to the overall sound of the Texas Blues.

=== Austin ===
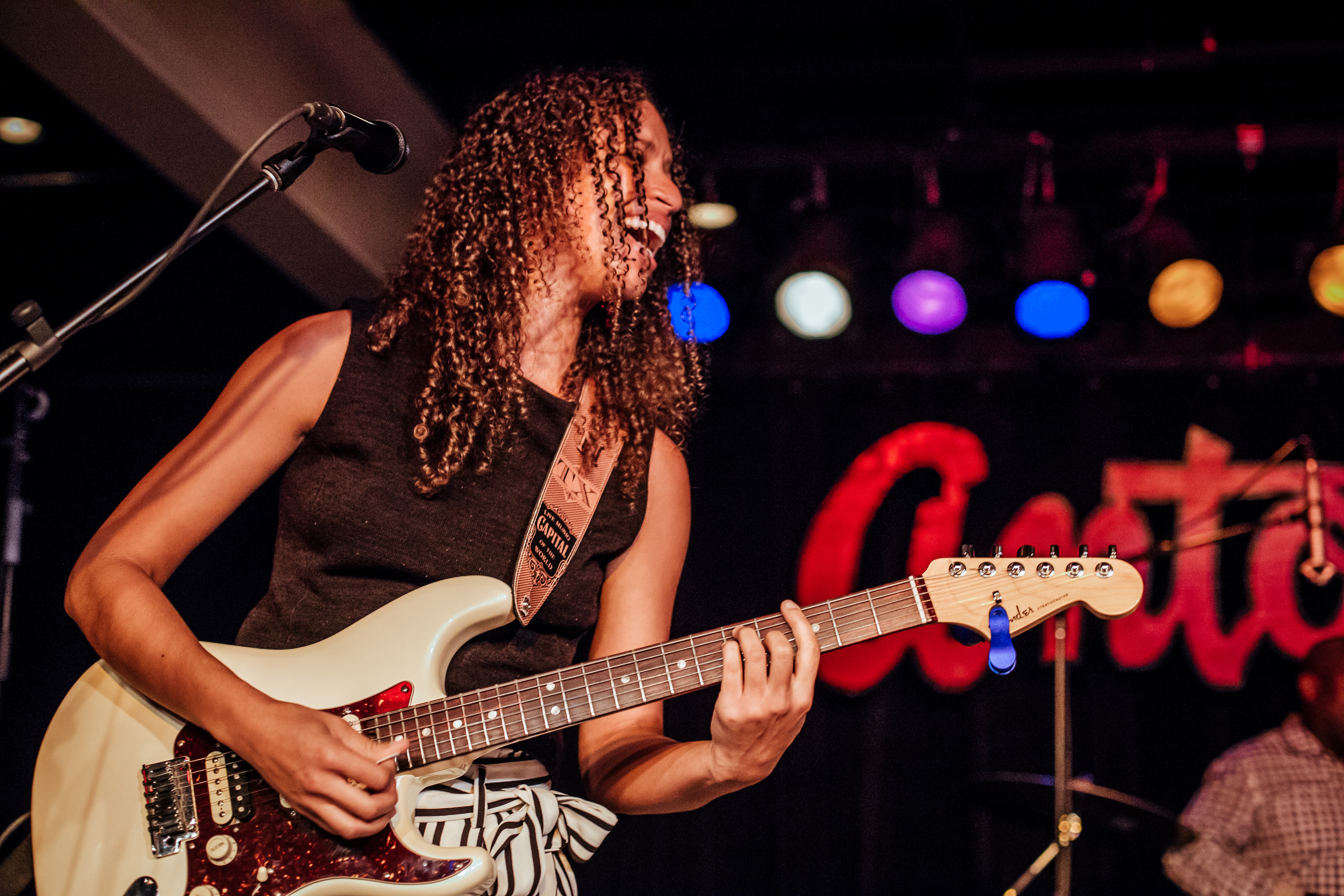
Jackie Venson Live at Antone's Night Club in Austin

While the blues scene in Austin was not as quick growing or prominent as Dallas and Houston, it still added to and exemplified the growth of Texas blues. In Austin, artists Lavada Durst, Grey Ghost, and Robert Shaw were prominent performers of the barrelhouse blues on piano. Part of why Austin was not as fast growing as Houston or Dallas was due to the relatively small African American population. Eventually, there was an increase in popularity of the Austin sound in the blues world, and people began to migrate to Austin to perform and learn. This influx of musicians occurred mostly in the 1960s and included Jimmie Vaughan, Stevie Ray Vaughan, and Kim Wilson. This migration helped to reinvigorate the blues scene in Austin and brought larger audiences to the African American blues artists that lived and performed there. Artists were able to perform at venues like Antone's and the Continental Club and reach larger audiences.

== See also ==
- Music of Texas
- Texas Roadhouse Music
- List of Texas blues musicians
