= Money, Mississippi =

- Unincorporated community
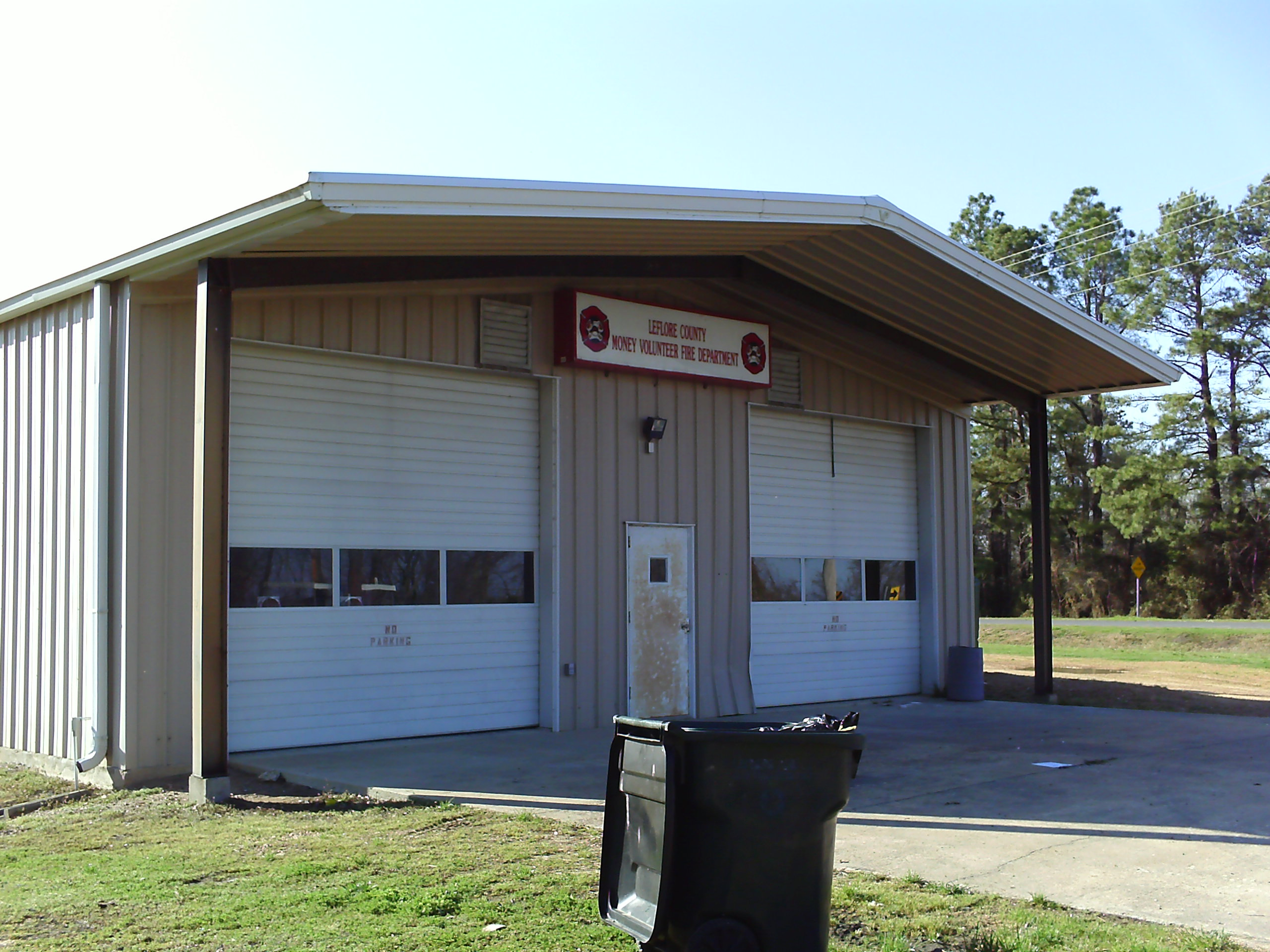
- Leflore County Volunteer Fire Department in Money

- Location in Mississippi Location in the United States
- Coordinates: 33°39′04″N 90°12′33″W
- Country: United States
- State: Mississippi
- County: Leflore
- Elevation: 138 ft (42 m)

Population
  - Total: about 100
- Time zone: UTC-6 (Central (CST))
  - Summer (DST): UTC-5 (CDT)
- Postal code: 38945
- GNIS feature ID: 673728

Money is an unincorporated community near Greenwood in Leflore County, Mississippi, United States, in the Mississippi Delta. It has about 100 residents, down from 400 in the early 1950s when a cotton mill operated there. Money is located on a railroad line along the Tallahatchie River, a tributary of the Yazoo River in the eastern part of the Mississippi Delta. The community has ZIP code 38945 in the Greenwood, Mississippi micropolitan area.

Money is known as the site of events that led to the lynching of 14-year-old Emmett Till, now considered a major catalyst of the civil rights movement.

== History ==
An aerial photograph of the ruins of Bryant's Grocery and Meat Market in Money, Mississippi, taken in September 2026.

The settlement was named for Hernando Money, a United States Senator from Mississippi. Money was a stop on the Yazoo and Mississippi Valley Railroad. This rural area was developed for cotton cultivation. The population in 1900 was 40. The Money post office was established in 1901.

Money gained international attention in 1955 after Emmett Till, a 14-year-old African-American boy visiting from Chicago, was accused of offending a white woman, Carolyn Bryant, at a local grocery store. Till was subsequently kidnapped and murdered by Bryant's husband and brother-in-law.

A historic marker has been placed in front of Bryant's Grocery, and the site draws "an ever-increasing number of tourists". The crumbling building is privately owned, which has hindered efforts to preserve it.

== Transportation ==
Amtrak’s City of New Orleans, which operates between New Orleans and Chicago, passes through the town on CN tracks, but makes no stop. The nearest station is located in Greenwood, 11 miles (18 km) to the south.

== Education ==
It is in the Greenwood-Leflore School District. Residents are zoned to Amanda Elzy High School.

The town was formerly served by the Leflore County School District. Effective July 1, 2019 this district consolidated into the Greenwood-Leflore School District.

== Notable people ==
- Richard "Hacksaw" Harney – Delta blues guitarist and pianist
- James Schaffer – religious leader and centenarian
- Willye White – Olympic athlete

== In popular culture ==
A wooden bridge across the Tallahatchie River at Money was the focus of Bobbie Gentry's 1967 hit song "Ode to Billie Joe." The November 10, 1967 issue of Life magazine featured a photo of Gentry crossing the bridge. The bridge collapsed in June 1972 after being burned by vandals. It has since been replaced.

The novel The Trees by Percival Everett is set in Money and depicts a mysterious series of murders that seem to follow identical patterns and involve the families of the confessed murderers of Emmett Till.
