= Sunnyside, Mississippi =

- Unincorporated community
- Location within Mississippi Location within the United States
- Coordinates: 33°41′47″N 90°17′42″W
- Country: United States
- State: Mississippi
- County: Leflore
- Elevation: 141 ft (43 m)
- Time zone: UTC-6 (Central (CST))
  - Summer (DST): UTC-5 (CDT)
- ZIP code: 38944
- Area code: 662
- GNIS feature ID: 678427

Sunnyside is an unincorporated community located in Leflore County, Mississippi. Sunnyside is approximately 5 miles (8.0 km) south of Minter City and approximately 8 miles (13 km) northwest of Schlater just off U.S. Highway 49E.

It is part of the Greenwood, Mississippi micropolitan area.

Sunnyside is located on the former Southern Railway and was once an important cotton shipping point. In 1900, the community had a population of 250.

A post office operated under the name Sunnyside from 1882 to 1917.
