= Morgan City, Mississippi =

- Town
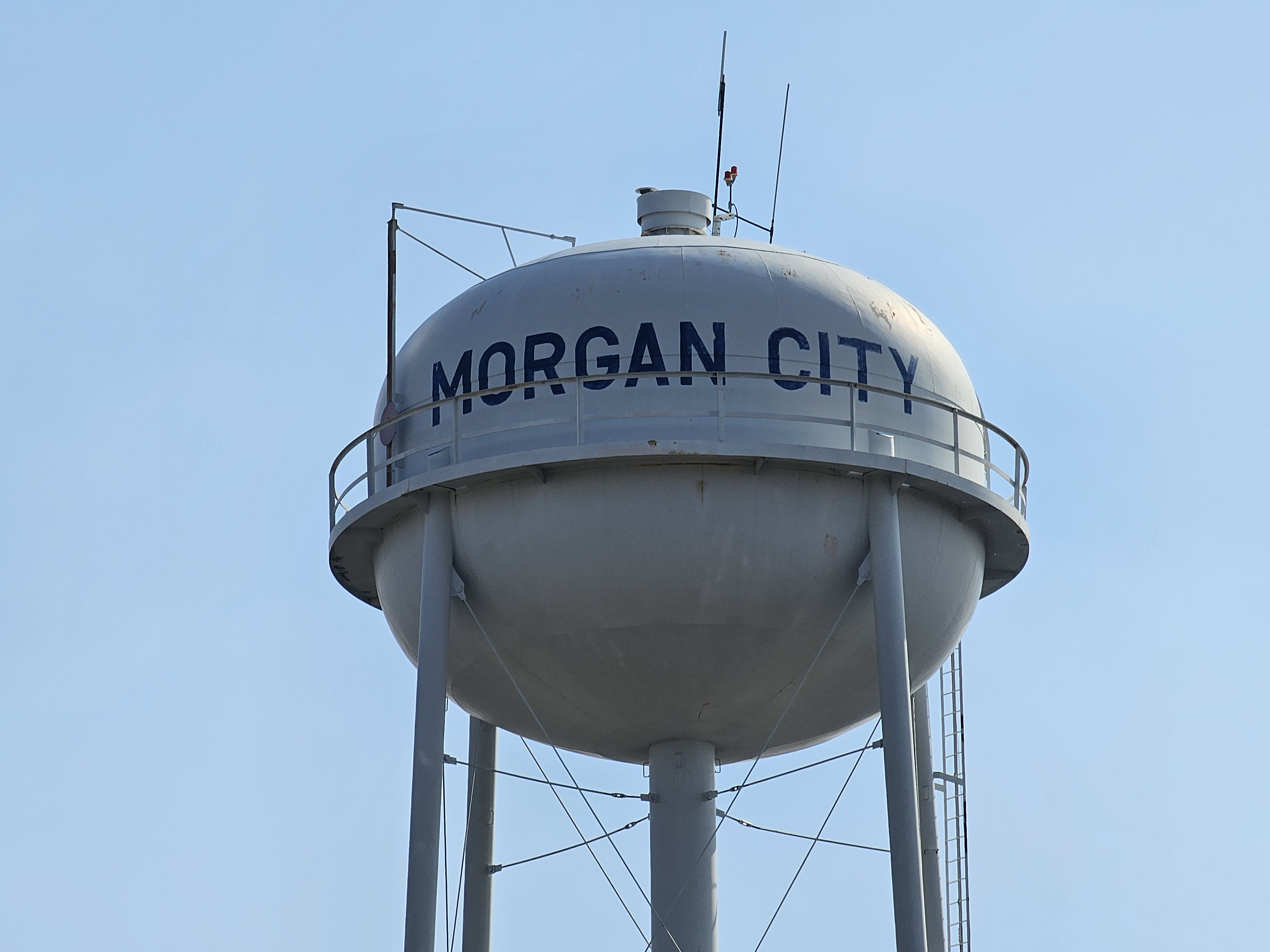

- Location of Morgan City, Mississippi

- Location in the United States
- Coordinates: 33°22′35″N 90°20′45″W
- Country: United States
- State: Mississippi
- County: Leflore

Area
  - Total: 0.59 sq mi (1.52 km^{2})
  - Land: 0.59 sq mi (1.52 km^{2})
  - Water: 0 sq mi (0.00 km^{2})
- Elevation: 115 ft (35 m)

Population (2020)
  - Total: 207
  - Density: 352.7/sq mi (136.19/km^{2})
- Time zone: UTC-6 (Central (CST))
  - Summer (DST): UTC-5 (CDT)
- ZIP code: 38946
- Area code: 662
- FIPS code: 28-48800
- GNIS feature ID: 2406193

Morgan City, Mississippi is a town in Leflore County along Mississippi Highway 7. As of the 2020 census, Morgan City had a population of 207. It is part of the Greenwood, Mississippi micropolitan area.

== Geography ==
Morgan City is located in southern Leflore County at 33°22′47″N 90°20′59″W (33.379637, -90.349713). Via Highway 7 it is 10 miles (16 km) south of Itta Bena and 16 miles (26 km) northeast of Belzoni. Greenwood, the Leflore county seat, is 16 miles (26 km) to the northeast of Morgan City.

According to the United States Census Bureau, the town has a total area of 0.58 square miles (1.5 km^{2}), all land. The town is 1.5 miles (2.4 km) northwest of the Yazoo River. Leflore County is part of the Mississippi Delta region.

== Demographics ==
Historical population
Census	Pop.	Note	%±
1970	207		—
1980	319		54.1%
1990	139		−56.4%
2000	305		119.4%
2010	255		−16.4%
2020	207		−18.8%
U.S. Decennial Census

=== Racial and ethnic composition ===
Morgan City town, Mississippi – Racial and ethnic composition Note: the US Census treats Hispanic/Latino as an ethnic category. This table excludes Latinos from the racial categories and assigns them to a separate category. Hispanics/Latinos may be of any race.
Race / Ethnicity (NH = Non-Hispanic)	Pop 2000	Pop 2010	Pop 2020	% 2000	% 2010	% 2020
White alone (NH)	50	48	33	16.39%	18.82%	15.94%
Black or African American alone (NH)	245	203	169	80.33%	79.61%	81.64%
Native American or Alaska Native alone (NH)	0	0	0	0.00%	0.00%	0.00%
Asian alone (NH)	1	0	0	0.33%	0.00%	0.00%
Native Hawaiian or Pacific Islander alone (NH)	0	0	0	0.00%	0.00%	0.00%
Other race alone (NH)	0	0	0	0.00%	0.00%	0.00%
Mixed race or Multiracial (NH)	0	0	0	0.00%	0.00%	0.00%
Hispanic or Latino (any race)	9	4	5	2.95%	1.57%	2.42%
Total	305	255	207	100.00%	100.00%	100.00%

=== 2010 census ===
As of the 2010 United States census, there were 255 people living in the town. The racial makeup of the town was 79.6% Black, 18.8% White and 1.6% were Hispanic or Latino of any race.

As of the census of 2000, there were 305 people, 98 households, and 77 families living in the town. The population density was 530.7 inhabitants per square mile (204.9/km^{2}). There were 101 housing units at an average density of 175.7 per square mile (67.8/km^{2}). The racial makeup of the town was 16.39% White, 83.28% African American and 0.33% Asian. Hispanic or Latino of any race were 2.95% of the population.

There were 98 households, out of which 41.8% had children under the age of 18 living with them, 33.7% were married couples living together, 40.8% had a female householder with no husband present, and 21.4% were non-families. 21.4% of all households were made up of individuals, and 10.2% had someone living alone who was 65 years of age or older. The average household size was 3.11 and the average family size was 3.56.

In the town, the population was spread out, with 36.1% under the age of 18, 11.5% from 18 to 24, 25.2% from 25 to 44, 15.4% from 45 to 64, and 11.8% who were 65 years of age or older. The median age was 27 years. For every 100 females, there were 78.4 males. For every 100 females age 18 and over, there were 69.6 males.

The median income for a household in the town was $19,219, and the median income for a family was $17,917. Males had a median income of $20,375 versus $13,929 for females. The per capita income for the town was $9,465. About 33.8% of families and 42.6% of the population were below the poverty line, including 48.3% of those under the age of eighteen and 50.0% of those 65 or over.

== Notable person ==
- Stewart Patridge, Conerly Trophy winning quarterback from the University of Mississippi

== Education ==
It is in the Greenwood-Leflore School District.

The town was served by the Leflore County School District. Effective July 1, 2019, this district consolidated into the Greenwood-Leflore School District.

== Musical significance ==
Mount Zion Missionary Baptist Church, founded in 1909 in the "Shellmound" area on the eastern edge of Morgan City, is the site of a large memorial marker (cenotaph) to blues legend Robert Johnson which was placed by the Mount Zion Memorial Fund through a major grant from Columbia Records and a number of smaller grants from organizations and individuals across the United States. The site now appears on numerous tour itineraries and is promoted by Leflore County.
