= Rising Sun, Mississippi =

- Unincorporated community
- Location within Mississippi Location within the United States
- Coordinates: 33°27′31″N 90°12′31″W
- Country: United States
- State: Mississippi
- County: Leflore
- Elevation: 125 ft (38 m)
- Time zone: UTC-6 (Central (CST))
  - Summer (DST): UTC-5 (CDT)
- ZIP code: 38954
- Area code: 662
- GNIS feature ID: 676672

Rising Sun is an unincorporated community located in Leflore County, Mississippi. Rising Sun is approximately 2 miles (3.2 km) south of Greenwood and 5 miles (8.0 km) north of Sidon on U.S. Route 49E . Some citizens refer to the area north of Rising Sun near the Hwy 82 and Hwy 49E intersection in Greenwood as being Rising Sun but the area is known as Craigside.

It is part of the Greenwood, Mississippi micropolitan area.

Rising Sun is located on the Canadian National Railway. A post office operated under the name Rising Sun from 1887 to 1912.

In 1900, the community had a population of 72.

== Transportation ==
Amtrak’s City of New Orleans, which operates between New Orleans and Chicago, passes through the town on CN tracks, but makes no stop. The nearest station is located in Greenwood, 4 miles (6.4 km) to the north.
