= Sherrod Gideon =

American gridiron football player (born 1977)

No. 15, 81, 19, 85
- Position: Wide receiver

Personal information
- Born: February 21, 1977 (age 49); Greenwood, Mississippi, U.S.
- Listed height: 5 ft 11 in (1.80 m)
- Listed weight: 171 lb (78 kg)

Career information
- High school: Greenwood
- College: Southern Miss
- NFL draft: 2000: 6th round, 200th overall pick

Career history

Playing
- New Orleans Saints (2000)*; Miami Dolphins (2000)*; St. Louis Rams (2001)*; Houston Texans (2002); Ottawa Renegades (2003–2004); BC Lions (2005)*
- * Offseason or practice squad member only

Coaching
- Leflore County High School (2009–2010) Offensive coordinator; Leflore County High School (2011–?) Head coach; Greenville High School Head coach; Yazoo City High School Head coach

Awards and highlights
- Conference USA All-Decade team

Career CFL statistics
- Receptions: 44
- Receiving yards: 684
- Touchdowns: 4

Head coaching record
- Regular season: 22–28–0 (.440)
- Postseason: 0–2–0 (.000)
- Career: 22–30–0 (.423)

Sherrod Gideon (born February 21, 1977) is an American former professional football wide receiver. He played college football at Southern Mississippi. He was selected by the New Orleans Saints in the sixth round of the 2000 NFL draft.

== Early life and college ==
Gideon was born in Greenwood, Mississippi and attended Greenwood High School.

Gideon attended college at Southern Mississippi. In 1996, he appeared in 11 games, recording 33 receptions for 500 yards and one touchdown. In 1997, he appeared in 12 games, recording 53 reception for 1,008 yards and nine touchdowns. He also returned 33 punts for 347 yards. That season the Golden Eagles defeated the Pittsburgh Panthers, 41-7 in Liberty Bowl with Gideon being named the game's MVP. For the season, he finished 1st in Conference USA in receiving yards and yards-per-reception (18.7). In 1998, he appeared in 11 games, recording 66 receptions for 1,186 for 13 touchdowns. He also returned five punts for 33 yards. He also finished 1st in C-USA with receiving touchdowns. After the season, he was named College Football News and College Sporting News All-America honorable mention. In 1999, he appeared in eight games, recording 40 receptions for 520 yards and seven touchdowns. He also returned six punts for 41 yards.

For his career he recorded 193 receptions for 3,214 yards and 30 touchdowns. His 1,186 receiving yards in 1998 stands as the Southern Mississippi single-season receiving yardage record.

In 2004, Gideon was named to Conference USA's first All-Decade team.

== Professional career ==
=== 2000 NFL draft ===
Pre-draft measurables
Height	Weight	40-yard dash	10-yard split	20-yard split
5 ft 11 in (1.80 m)	173 lb (78 kg)	4.66 s	1.56 s	2.63 s
All values from NFL combine

=== National Football League ===
Gideon was selected in the sixth round (200th overall) in the 2000 NFL draft by the New Orleans Saints. He spent time in 2000, on the practice squad of the Miami Dolphins. On October 2, 2001, the St. Louis Rams signed Gideon to the team's practice squad.

On February 8, 2002, he was signed by the Houston Texans. He was released on September 18.

=== Canadian Football League ===
In 2003, Gideon appeared in 13 games for the Ottawa Renegades. For the season he caught 34 passes for 503 yards and four touchdowns. He was 1-of-1 for 10 yards passing, he ran the ball one time for one yard. In 2004, he appeared in 10 games. He recorded 10 receptions for 181 yards.

On June 9, 2005 Gideon was released by the BC Lions.

== Coaching career ==
In 2009, Gideon joined Leflore County High School as the football team's offensive coordinator. In June 2011, he was named LeFlore's head coach. He was then head coach at Greenville High School and is mow the head coach at Yazoo City High School. Gideon moved to Leake Central high school in 2022-26 he was assistant til 25 and varsity football coach til 26 he has now moved to mcomb Mississippi as the varsity football coach
