= Solomon Osborne =

American politician

Member of the Mississippi House of Representatives from the 32nd district
- Incumbent
- Assumed office March 18, 2019
- Preceded by: Willie Perkins Sr.

Personal details
- Born: Solomon Curtis Osborne; May 6, 1948 (age 78) Minter City, Mississippi, U.S.
- Party: Democratic
- Children: 4 (1 deceased)
- Education: Tougaloo College (BA); University of Illinois (JD)

Solomon Curtis Osborne (born May 6, 1948) is an American attorney and politician serving as a member of the Mississippi House of Representatives from the 32nd district. He assumed office on March 18, 2019.

== Early life and education ==
Osborn was born in Minter City, Mississippi. After graduating from Amanda Elzy High School, he earned a Bachelor of Arts degree in political science from Tougaloo College and a Juris Doctor from the University of Illinois College of Law.

== Career ==
From 1973 to 1978, Osborne worked as a staff attorney for North Mississippi Rural Legal Services. From 1978 to 1984, he was the executive director of Southwest Mississippi Legal Services. From 1984 to 1990, he was a senior attorney for North Mississippi Rural Legal Services. In 1989 and 1990, he was also a staff attorney at the Center for Constitutional Rights. Osborne later worked for the Leflore County, Mississippi Public Defender's Office and as an attorney for the Delta Correctional Facility Authority. From 1998 to 2001, he was a county judge. Osborne has been an adjunct professor at Mississippi Valley State University and Tougaloo College. Osborne was elected to the Mississippi House of Representatives in a March 18, 2019 special election.
