= U.S. Route 49E =

U.S. Highway in Mississippi

U.S. Highway 49E

Route information
- Maintained by MDOT
- Length: 89.6 mi (144.2 km) (85.862 mi according to state mileage)
- Existed: 1932–present

Major junctions
- South end: US 49 / US 49W in Yazoo City
- MS 12 in Tchula; US 82 / MS 7 in Greenwood; MS 8 in Minter City; MS 32 in Webb
- North end: US 49 / US 49W / MS 3 in Tutwiler

Location
- Country: United States
- State: Mississippi
- Counties: Yazoo, Holmes, Leflore, Tallahatchie

Highway system
- United States Numbered Highway System; List; Special; Divided; Mississippi State Highway System; Interstate; US; State
← US 49	→ US 49W

U.S. Route 49E (US 49E) is an 89.6-mile-long (144.2 km) U.S. Highway in the Delta region of Mississippi. It travels through Yazoo, Holmes, Leflore, and Tallahatchie counties.

== Route description ==
US 49E begins at an interchange between US 49 and US 49W, just north of downtown Yazoo City in Yazoo County. It heads northeast along the western edge of some Loess bluffs for several miles to pass through Eden and enter the Hillside National Wildlife Refuge before crossing into Holmes County.

The highway passes through the refuge for several miles before leaving, crossing over some railroad tracks, and heading north along the banks of Bee Lake to pass through Thornton. US 49E turns northeast to become concurrent with MS 12 and pass through Mileston before passing through rural farmland for a few miles to enter Tchula. In Tchula, the highway bypasses downtown to south and east, where it intersects unsigned MS 835 and MS 12 splits off toward Lexington. US 49E parallels Tchula Lake as it passes through the Morgan Brake National Wildlife Refuge and Cruger, where it intersects unsigned MS 818. It then crosses into Leflore County shortly thereafter.

The highway immediately passes through the Mathews Brake National Wildlife Refuge before passing through Sidon, where it intersects MS 706, and Rising Sun. US 49E now enters Greenwood and comes to an interchange and becomes concurrent with US 82/MS 7 just south of downtown. Prior to this point, the entire route of US 49E is a two-land highway. The highway heads as a four-lane highway to pass through business districts and cross the Yazoo River before leaving Greenwood and US 49E splits off and heads north. US 49E narrows to 2-lanes and has an intersection with MS 442 before passing through Minter City, where it intersects MS 8. It now crosses into Tallahatchie County.

US 49E crosses a bridge over a creek before passing through Glendora (where it intersects MS 734), Webb (where it has a short concurrency with MS 32), and Sumner (where it intersects MS 728) as it parallels the Tallahatchie River to the east. The highway then enters Tutwiler and comes to an end shortly thereafter at a Y-Intersection between US 49, US 49W, and MS 3.

== History ==
U.S. Route 49E represents the original route of US 49 between 1928 and 1932, when the US 49E/W split between Yazoo City and Tutwiler was made. This route is now generally perceived as the lesser of the two.

It is notable that for several years during the 1930s, a second split route existed on US 49 in South Mississippi, similar to but shorter than the split that still exists in the Delta region. Between Brooklyn and Hattiesburg, travelers had the option of a 24-mile-long (39 km) direct route via US 49W, or a somewhat shorter but broken route on US 49E, serving the Forrest County Agricultural High School and the small community of McLaurin, Mississippi.

== Major intersections ==
County	Location	mi	km	Destinations	Notes
Yazoo	Yazoo City	0.0	0.0	US 49 south (Jerry Clower Boulevard) / US 49W north (Haley Barbour Parkway) to MS 3 south – Jackson, Indianola, Vicksburg	Interchange; US 49 splits into US 49E and US 49W
Holmes		17.9	28.8	MS 12 west – Belzoni	South end of MS 12 overlap
Holmes	Tchula	24.5	39.4	Front Street (MS 835 north) – Downtown	Southern terminus of unsigned MS 835
Holmes	Tchula	24.9	40.1	MS 12 east – Lexington	North end of MS 12 overlap
Holmes	Cruger	35.0	56.3	Main Street (MS 818 west) – Downtown	Eastern terminus of unsigned MS 818
Leflore	Sidon	41.6	66.9	MS 706 west (Front Street) – Downtown	Eastern terminus of MS 706
Leflore	Greenwood	48.8	78.5	US 82 east / MS 7 north / MS 743 north – Winona	Cloverleaf interchange; south end of US 82/MS 7 overlap
Leflore	Greenwood	53.2	85.6	US 82 west / MS 7 south – Itta Bena, Indianola	North end of US 82/MS 7 overlap
Leflore		61.6	99.1	MS 442 west – Schlater, Doddsville	Eastern terminus of MS 442
Leflore	Minter City	68.8	110.7	MS 8 – Ruleville, Grenada	
Tallahatchie		74.8	120.4	MS 734 east (Sturdivant Road) – Glendora	Western terminus of MS 734
Tallahatchie		82.7	133.1	MS 32 west – Parchman	South end of MS 32 overlap
Tallahatchie	Webb	83.5	134.4	MS 32 east – Charleston	North end of MS 32 overlap
Tallahatchie	Sumner	86.0	138.4	MS 728 east (Monroe Street) – Downtown	Western terminus of MS 728
Tallahatchie	Tutwiler	89.6	144.2	US 49 north / US 49W south / MS 3 – Indianola, Clarksdale, Memphis	US 49E and US 49W merge to form US 49
1.000 mi = 1.609 km; 1.000 km = 0.621 mi: Concurrency terminus
