= Leflore County High School =

Coordinates: 33.4889°N 90.3210°W

Location
- 401 Lakeside Drive; Itta Bena, Mississippi 38941; United States

Information
- Type: Public High School
- School district: Greenwood-Leflore Consolidated School District (2019-); Leflore County School District (-2019)
- Principal: Raymond Russell
- Teaching staff: 27.54 (FTE)
- Grades: 7–12
- Enrollment: 313 (2023–2024)
- Student to teacher ratio: 11.37
- Colors: Red and black
- Mascot: Tiger
- Website: lchs.glcsd.org

Leflore County High School or LCHS is a public high school in Itta Bena, Mississippi, United States. It is a part of the Greenwood-Leflore Consolidated School District.

== History ==
Previously the school was in the Leflore County School District. On July 1, 2019, the Leflore County and Greenwood districts consolidated into the Greenwood-Leflore School District.

Sherrod Gideon coached the football team.

== Campus ==
Leflore County High is located in the small rural town of Itta Bena, Mississippi in Leflore County on Lakeside Drive. On campus, Leflore County Elementary, which serves pre-K through 6th grade, is in back the high school.
