= Mario Branch =

American football player (1979–2011)

Profile
- Position: Offensive tackle

Personal information
- Born: August 13, 1979; Greenwood, Mississippi
- Died: April 8, 2011 (aged 31); Nashville, Tennessee
- Listed height: 6 ft 7 in (2.01 m)
- Listed weight: 340 lb (154 kg)

Career information
- High school: Greenwood (Greenwood, Mississippi)
- College: Mississippi Valley State
- NFL draft: 2003: undrafted

Career history
- Tennessee Titans (2003–2004)*; Amsterdam Admirals (2004); Philadelphia Soul (2005); Nashville Storm (2007)
- * Offseason or practice squad member only
- Stats at ArenaFan.com

Mario Branch (August 13, 1979 – April 8, 2011) was an American football offensive tackle. He was signed by the Tennessee Titans as an undrafted free agent in 2003, but did not make the team in two seasons. He was allocated to NFL Europe in 2004 to play for the Amsterdam Admirals. He played for the Philadelphia Soul in 2005 and for the Nashville Storm in 2007. He played college football at Mississippi Valley State.

He died due to congestive heart failure in April 2011 at the age of 31.
