= Minter City, Mississippi =

- Unincorporated community
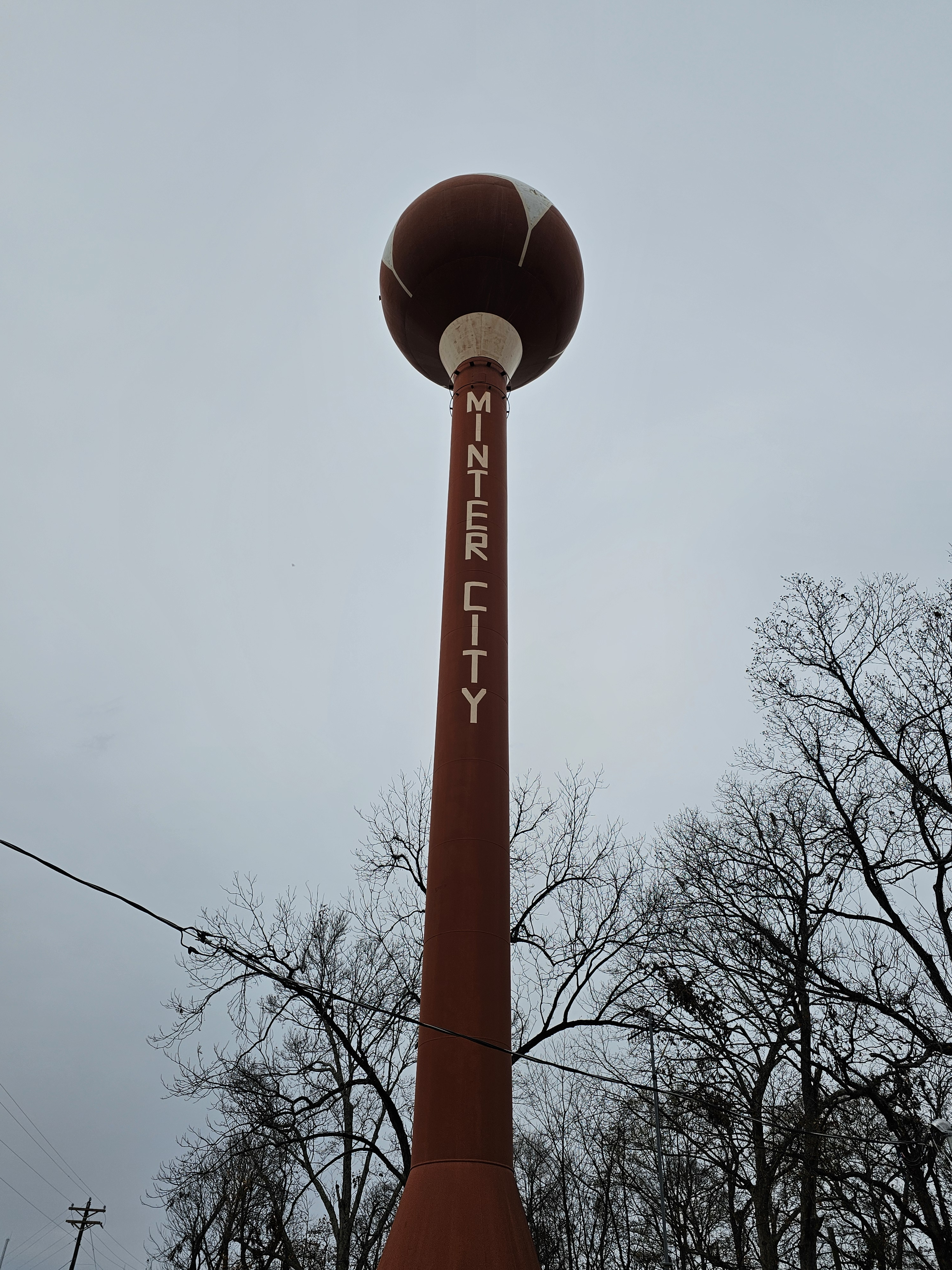

- Location within Mississippi Location within the United States
- Coordinates: 33°45′02″N 90°17′53″W
- Country: United States
- State: Mississippi
- Counties: Leflore
- Elevation: 141 ft (43 m)
- Time zone: UTC−6 (Central (CST))
  - Summer (DST): UTC−5 (CDT)
- ZIP Code: 38944
- Area code: 662
- GNIS feature ID: 673683

Minter City is an unincorporated community in Leflore County and Tallahatchie County, Mississippi, United States. It is part of the Greenwood, Mississippi micropolitan area, and is within the Mississippi Delta.

Mississippi Highway 8 intersects U.S. Route 49E southwest of Minter City, and the Tallahatchie River flows to the east. The post office on U.S. Route 49E has the ZIP Code 38944.

== History ==
The original settlement was known as "Walnut Place Landing" and "Minter City Landing".

After traveling down Charley's Trace (also known as the Old Trading Trail), Spanish explorer Hernando de Soto may have crossed the Tallahatchie River near Minter City as his party traveled west in 1541.

In 1849, James A. Towne bought 10,000 acres (4,000 ha) in the area for 25 cents per acre, and built a log house on the western shore of the river at Minter City. Known as "Uncle Jimmy", Towne supported the local Methodist church, and was known to give each new preacher a wagon and mule.

The "James Minter Ferry", documented in 1868, enabled the crossing of the Tallahatchie River at this site.

Minter City became a junction for two railroads, both now abandoned. The Mobile, Jackson and Kansas City Railroad was established in 1890, and the Minter City Southern and Western Railroad, a shortline railroad servicing the sawmills west of Minter City, began operating in 1904. A depot and railroad facilities were erected in Minter City.

The African-American educator William H. Holtzclaw, founder of the Utica Normal and Industrial Institute for the Training of Colored Young Men and Young Women (now part of Hinds Community College) in Utica, Mississippi, wrote about his experiences establishing schools for African-Americans in Mississippi in his book The Black Man's Burden, published in 1915. In it, he describes meeting with a wealthy white plantation owner in Minter City to discuss the establishment of a school there:

I believe you are about to engage in a good work, and I would like to see the Negro educated, but, candidly, I do not think that the kind of school you would like to start would do any good in the Delta. I really think it would do harm. What I want here is Negroes who can make cotton, and they don't need education to help them make cotton. I could not use educated Negroes on my place, but since you have asked me for advice, I will tell you candidly that here in the Delta is no place to start a school.

The Frank Streater Consolidated School (White) was constructed in Minter City in 1921. The abandoned building burned in 2013.

Minter City was the site of a lynching in 1933. Richard Roscoe, an African-American Baptist deacon and tenant farmer, had been in a physical altercation with the white plantation manager, and both men had been injured. An hour later, Roscoe was abducted, shot dead, and then dragged through the streets of Minter City tied to the back of the sheriff's car.

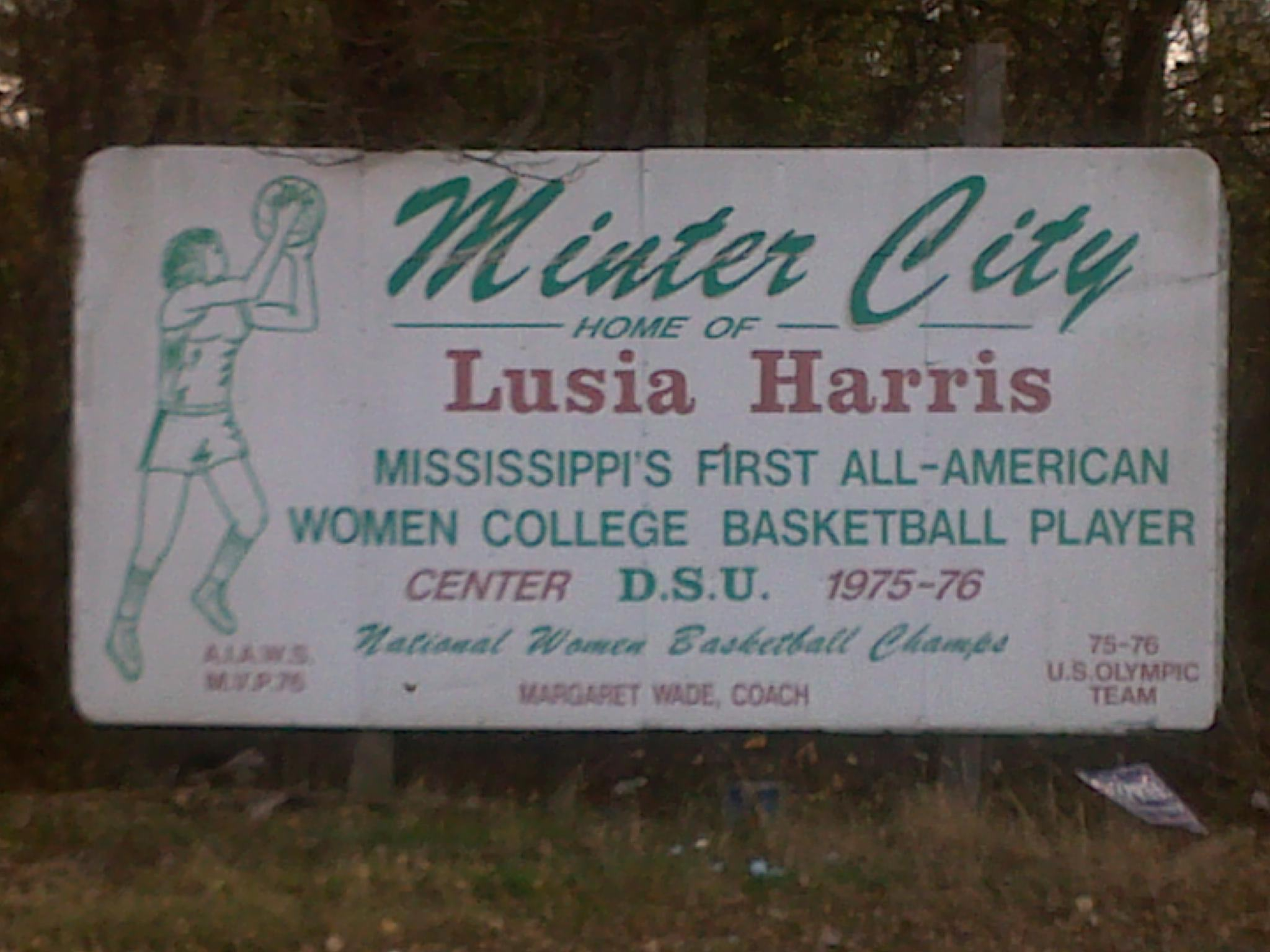
Sign on U.S. Highway 49E celebrating Minter City as the hometown of Lusia Harris

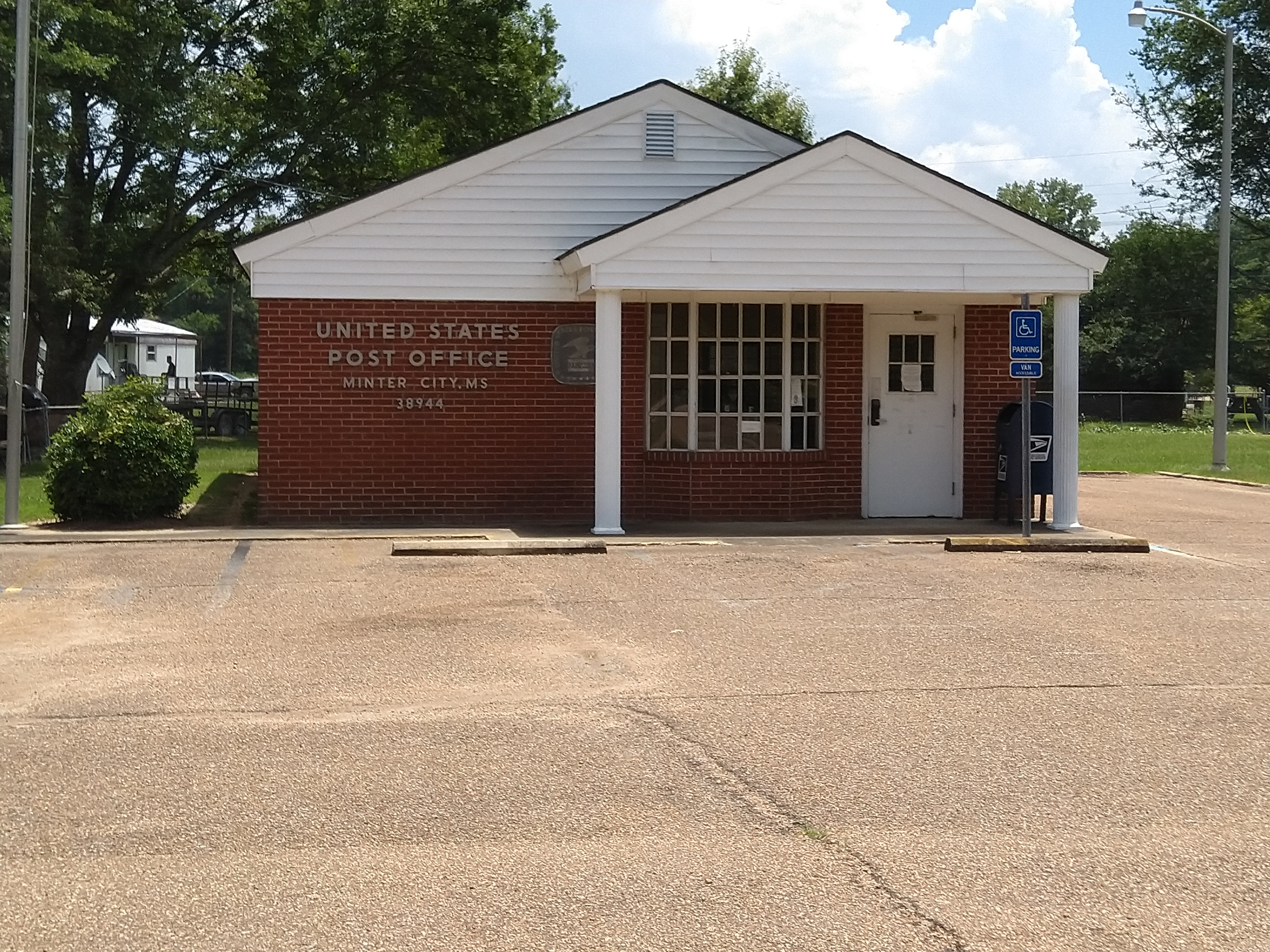
Post office

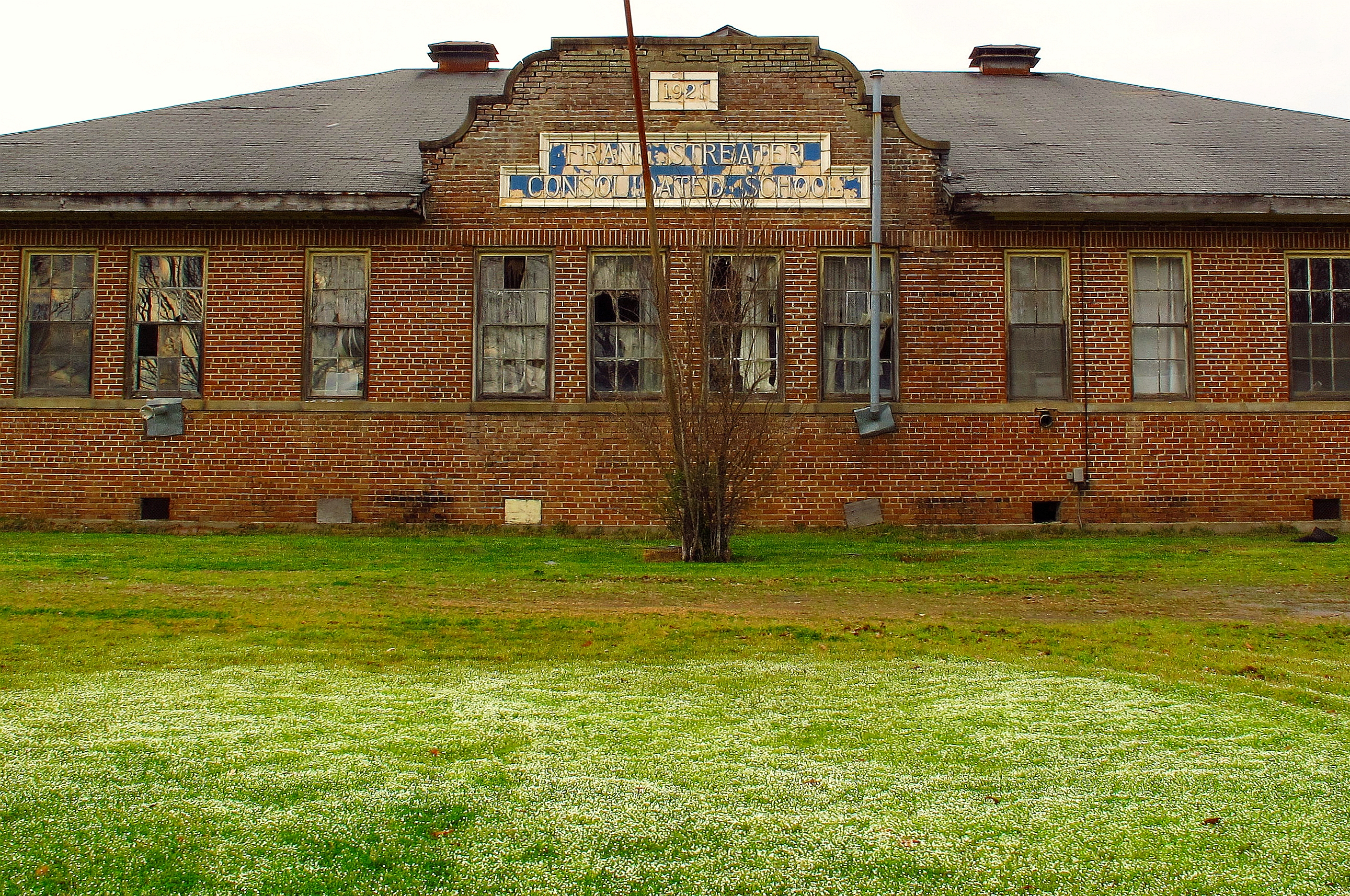
Frank Streater Consolidated School

== Education ==
Areas in Leflore County are is in the Greenwood-Leflore School District. Residents are zoned to Amanda Elzy High School. This area was formerly served by the Leflore County School District. T.Y. Fleming Elementary School was in the area, but it closed in 2009. The editor of the Greenwood Commonwealth criticized the closure. Effective July 1, 2019 the Leflore district consolidated into the Greenwood-Leflore School District.

Areas in the Tallahatchie County portion are zoned to the West Tallahatchie School District. The local schools for West Tallahatchie are R. H. Bearden Elementary School and West Tallahatchie High School. Previously Black Bayou Elementary School in Glendora served southern parts of the West Tallahatchie district. The district decided to close Black Bayou in 1998. Previously West District Middle School (now Bearden) served as a middle school for the West Tallahatchie area.

Mississippi Delta Community College is the designated community college for Leflore County. Coahoma Community College is the designated community college for Tallahatchie County.

== In popular culture ==
- Richard Ford references Minter City in his 1996 novel Independence Day.

== Notable people ==
- L.C. Green, blues guitarist.
- Lusia Harris, Olympic silver medalist and All American basketball player.
- M. Carl Holman, author, poet and playwright.
- Kemp Malone, linguist and literary scholar.
- Solomon Osborne, member of the Mississippi House of Representatives
- Homer Spragins, former pitcher for the Philadelphia Phillies
