= Delta Streets Academy =

Christian boys school in Mississippi, US

Location
- 401 George St, Greenwood, MS 38930; Greenwood, Mississippi, United States, Mississippi 39930; United States; 33.5190586°N 90.17973230000001°W

Information
- Type: Private, Christian, boys only
- Founded: 2012
- Status: Open from 7:45am to 5:30pm
- Head of school: Coach "T-Mac" Howard
- Grades: 6-12
- Average class size: 12 students
- Athletics conference: Midsouth Association of Independent Schools
- Nickname: DSA
- Team name: Lions
- Rival: Pillow Academy
- Accreditation: Mississippi Association of Independent Schools
- Tuition: $750 per year
- Website: www.deltastreetsacademy.org
- Last updated: August 9, 2023

Delta Streets Academy (DSA) is a Christian school located in Greenwood, Mississippi for males in grades 3-12.

== History ==
Thomas McMillin "T-Mac" Howard, who previously taught at the public Greenwood High School, established a day school in 2012, stating that he felt dissatisfied with Greenwood High, which is 98% black and receives "F" grades from the state. Students were behind academically, hindered by a lack of discipline, frequently arriving in class as much as 20 minutes late with no consequences, and experienced a 33% dropout rate. The First Baptist Church served as the temporary location of the classrooms, and agreed to do so at no charge. Howard began serving as the bus driver, marketing official, janitor, and coach of the American football team. The initial enrollment was 14 students, with the school initially only having grades 7 and 8. The school expanded with new grade levels in subsequent years. In 2013, more than twenty boys enrolled at DSA. DSA also expanded to 9th grade in 2013-2014 school year. In 2014, Delta Streets received accreditation Mississippi Association of Independent Schools. In 2015, the school had 60 students, all African-American, and the enrollment was about the same in 2018. The students tend to be from low-income backgrounds.

The school began construction on its permanent facility, and students were assisting the construction. It was scheduled to open in fall 2018.

== Athletics- ==
Delta Streets supports athletic programs in basketball, football, and soccer.

== Funding ==
As of 2016, private funding made up most of the funding for the school; only $41,500 of the school's expenditures of $515,000 were derived from tuition. It holds the Delta Streets Charity Weekend every year.
