= Mississippi Valley State (CDP), Mississippi =

Mississippi Valley State University
- Census-designated place
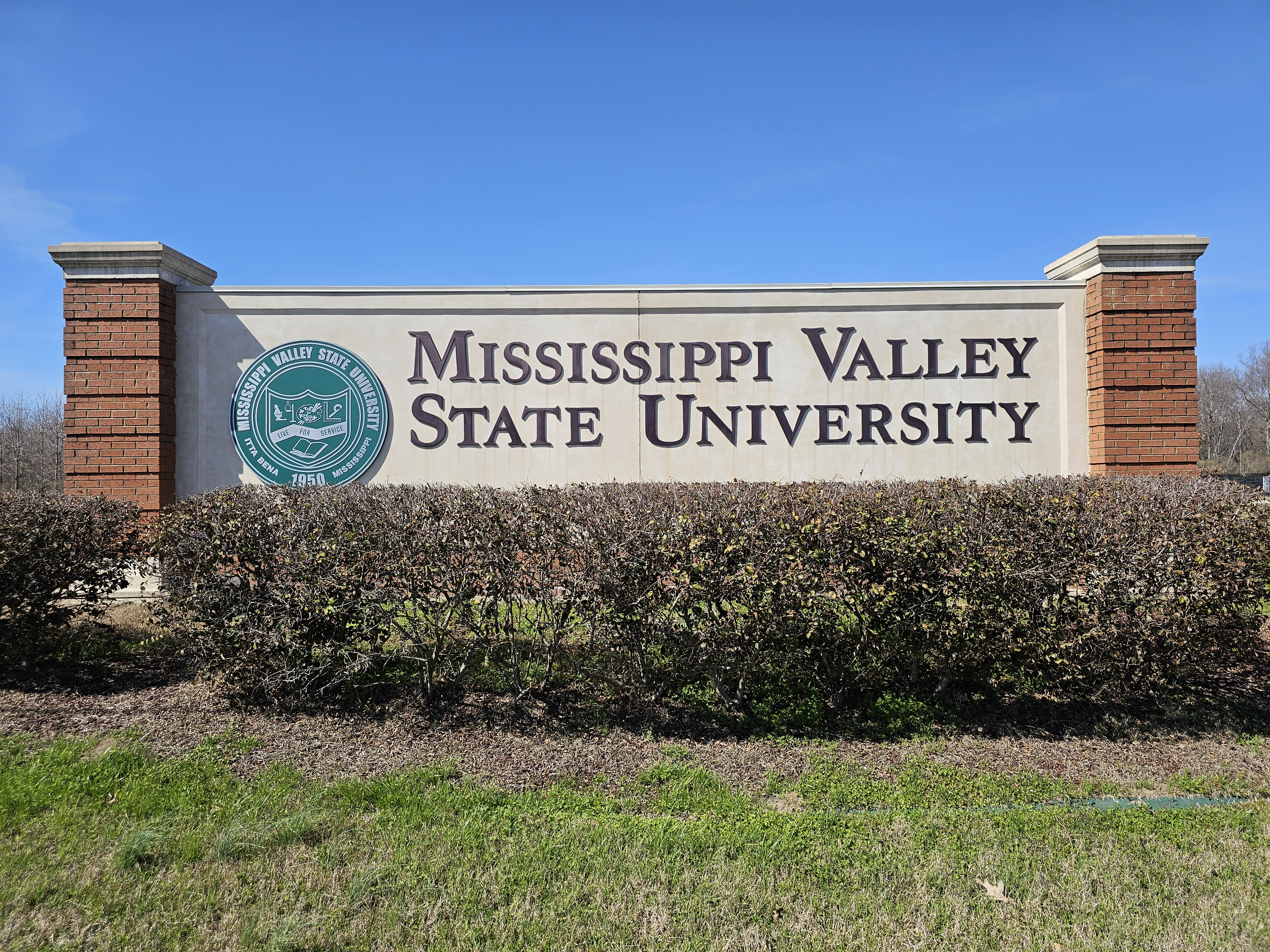

- Location within Mississippi Location within the United States
- Coordinates: 33°31′02″N 90°20′40″W
- Country: United States
- State: Mississippi
- County: Leflore

Area
  - Total: 1.80 sq mi (4.65 km^{2})
  - Land: 1.80 sq mi (4.65 km^{2})
  - Water: 0 sq mi (0.00 km^{2})
- Elevation: 125 ft (38 m)

Population (2020)
  - Total: 805
  - Density: 448.5/sq mi (173.15/km^{2})
- Time zone: UTC-6 (Central (CST))
  - Summer (DST): UTC-5 (CDT)
- ZIP code: 38941 (Itta Bena)
- Area code: 662
- FIPS code: 28-48120
- GNIS feature ID: 2586603

Mississippi Valley State University is a census-designated place in Leflore County, Mississippi, United States. The population at the 2020 census was 805. It is the location of Mississippi Valley State University and is adjacent to Itta Bena.

== Demographics ==
Historical population
Census	Pop.	Note	%±
2010	1,182		—
2020	805		−31.9%
U.S. Decennial Census; 2010 2010

Mississippi Valley State first appeared as a census designated place in the 2010 U.S. census.

=== 2020 census ===
Mississippi Valley State University CDP – Racial and ethnic composition Note: the US Census treats Hispanic/Latino as an ethnic category. This table excludes Latinos from the racial categories and assigns them to a separate category. Hispanics/Latinos may be of any race.
Race / Ethnicity (NH = Non-Hispanic)	Pop 2010	Pop 2020	% 2010	% 2020
White alone (NH)	47	132	3.98%	16.40%
Black or African American alone (NH)	1,081	593	91.46%	73.66%
Native American or Alaska Native alone (NH)	1	3	0.08%	0.37%
Asian alone (NH)	18	9	1.52%	1.12%
Pacific Islander alone (NH)	0	0	0.00%	0.00%
Some Other Race alone (NH)	5	4	0.42%	0.50%
Mixed Race or Multi-Racial (NH)	19	5	1.61%	0.62%
Hispanic or Latino (any race)	11	59	0.93%	7.33%
Total	1,182	805	100.00%	100.00%

=== 2010 Census ===
As of the 2010 United States census, there were 1,182 people living in the CDP. The racial makeup of the CDP was 91.5% Black, 4.0% White, 0.1% Native American, 1.5% Asian, 0.4% from some other race and 1.6% from two or more races. 0.9% were Hispanic or Latino of any race.

== Education ==
MVSU includes faculty and staff apartments and other residential apartments. Dependent children living in these units are within the Greenwood-Leflore School District. These apartments were formerly served by the Leflore County School District. Effective July 1, 2019 this district consolidated into the Greenwood-Leflore School District.
