= AEHS =

AEHS may refer to:

- Albert Einstein High School
- Amanda Elzy High School
- Ankara Elementary/High School, Department of Defense Education Activity
