= Frank Ellis Smith =

American politician (1918–1997)

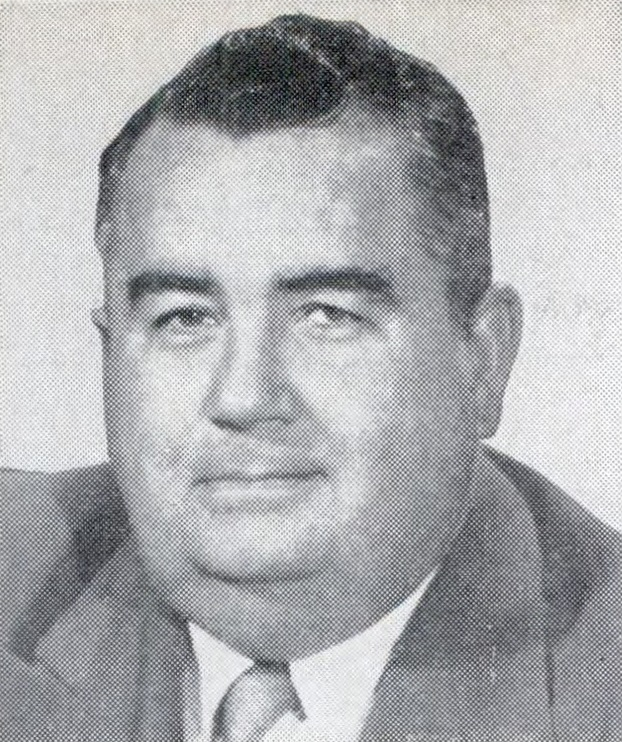

Member of the U.S. House of Representatives from Mississippi's 3rd district
- In office January 3, 1951 – November 14, 1962
- Preceded by: William M. Whittington
- Succeeded by: Jamie Whitten (redistricting)

Personal details
- Born: February 21, 1918 Sidon, Mississippi, U.S.
- Died: August 2, 1997 (aged 79) Jackson, Mississippi, U.S.
- Party: Democratic

Frank Ellis Smith (February 21, 1918 – August 2, 1997) was an American World War II veteran and politician who served six terms as a U.S. representative from Mississippi from 1951 to 1962.

== Early life and education ==
Born to immigrant parents in Sidon, Mississippi on February 21, 1918, Frank Ellis Smith grew up in Greenwood, Mississippi. His father, a deputy sheriff, was killed by a prisoner when Frank was eight.

Smith attended public schools before enrolling at Sunflower Junior College in Moorhead, Mississippi. There, he was a student editor of the college newspaper, frequently writing from a liberal perspective about race relations, a controversial topic in Mississippi at the time.

After graduating junior college in 1936, he became a freelance writer, eventually graduating from the University of Mississippi in 1941. There, he was a member of Beta Theta Pi.

== World War II ==
Following the attack on Pearl Harbor, Smith enlisted in the United States Army as a private on February 9, 1942. He graduated from the Field Artillery Officers Candidate School and served in Europe as a captain with the Two Hundred and Forty-third Field Artillery Battalion, Third Army. Most notably, he participated in the historic Normandy invasion in 1944. He was discharged to the Reserves as a major of Field Artillery on February 13, 1946.

== Early career ==
He was managing editor of the liberal-leaning newspaper Greenwood Morning Call in 1946 and 1947. He also enrolled as a student at American University, Washington, D.C., in 1946. He was a legislative assistant to United States Senator John Stennis from 1947 to 1949.

He was elected to and served as a member of the state senate from 1948 to 1950.

== Congress ==
In 1950, Smith was elected as a Democrat to the U.S. House of Representatives. He was elected to the Eighty-second and the five succeeding Congresses, serving from January 3, 1951, until his resignation November 14, 1962. He was unsuccessful for renomination in 1962 to the Eighty-eighth Congress.

=== Defeat ===
After Mississippi lost a congressional seat in the reapportionment process, Smith was forced to run in the 1962 Democratic primary against segregationist congressman Jamie Whitten, who had held the seat since 1941. Whitten won the race and Smith was subsequently appointed by President Kennedy to the governing board of the Tennessee Valley Authority.

=== Other issues ===
Smith had a more mainstream voting record on other issues important to his constituents, such as support for the cotton industry and federal flood control legislation. He also supported tariff reductions and the United Nations.

== Later career ==
Smith served on the Tennessee Valley Authority board from November 14, 1962, to May 18, 1972, where he favored conservationist policies. During that time he also remained active in Mississippi politics and civil rights causes.

He ran third in a 1972 congressional primary in seeking reelection to the U.S. House and missed the runoff. He served as associate director of the Illinois State Board of Higher Education from 1973 to 1974 and was a visiting professor at Virginia Tech from 1977 to 1979. He served as a special assistant to Governor William Winter of Mississippi from 1980 to 1983.

== Retirement ==
In 1983, he retired from public service and opened a bookstore with his son. He also wrote a regular column for the local newspaper. Smith was elected life fellow of the Southern Regional Council in 1984 and remained active in local organizations until his death.

== Death and burial ==
Smith died in Jackson, Mississippi, on August 2, 1997. He was buried in Sidon Cemetery, Sidon, Mississippi.

U.S. House of Representatives
Preceded by William M. Whittington	Member of the U.S. House of Representatives from Mississippi's 3rd congressional district 1951-1962	Succeeded by John B. Williams
