= Schlater, Mississippi =

- Town
- Location of Schlater, Mississippi

- Location in the United States
- Coordinates: 33°38′23″N 90°20′58″W
- Country: United States
- State: Mississippi
- County: Leflore

Government
  - Type: Mayor and board of aldermen

Area
  - Total: 1.15 sq mi (2.99 km^{2})
  - Land: 1.15 sq mi (2.99 km^{2})
  - Water: 0 sq mi (0.00 km^{2})
- Elevation: 131 ft (40 m)

Population (2020)
  - Total: 236
  - Density: 204.5/sq mi (78.95/km^{2})
- Time zone: UTC-6 (Central (CST))
  - Summer (DST): UTC-5 (CDT)
- ZIP code: 38952
- Area code: 662
- FIPS code: 28-66080
- GNIS feature ID: 2407296

Schlater is a town in Leflore County, Mississippi, United States. As of the 2020 census, Schlater had a population of 236. It is part of the Greenwood, Mississippi micropolitan area.

== Geography ==
Schlater is located in northwestern Leflore County. Mississippi Highway 442 passes through the town, leading east 3 miles (5 km) to U.S. Route 49E and west 10 miles (16 km) to Doddsville and U.S. Route 49W. Via US-49E Schlater is 17 miles (27 km) northwest of Greenwood, the Leflore county seat.

According to the United States Census Bureau, the town has a total area of 1.2 square miles (3.0 km^{2}), all of it recorded as land. McNutt Lake is a narrow waterway that passes through the town, connecting Ashland Brake to the east with the Quiver River to the west, part of the Yazoo River watershed.

== Demographics ==
Historical population
Census	Pop.	Note	%±
1970	398		—
1980	429		7.8%
1990	404		−5.8%
2000	388		−4.0%
2010	310		−20.1%
2020	236		−23.9%
U.S. Decennial Census

=== Racial and ethnic composition ===
Schlater town, Mississippi – Racial and ethnic composition Note: the US Census treats Hispanic/Latino as an ethnic category. This table excludes Latinos from the racial categories and assigns them to a separate category. Hispanics/Latinos may be of any race.
Race / Ethnicity (NH = Non-Hispanic)	Pop 2000	Pop 2010	Pop 2020	% 2000	% 2010	% 2020
White alone (NH)	151	90	59	38.92%	29.03%	25.00%
Black or African American alone (NH)	235	213	171	60.57%	68.71%	72.46%
Native American or Alaska Native alone (NH)	0	0	0	0.00%	0.00%	0.00%
Asian alone (NH)	2	0	0	0.52%	0.00%	0.00%
Native Hawaiian or Pacific Islander alone (NH)	0	0	0	0.00%	0.00%	0.00%
Other race alone (NH)	0	0	0	0.00%	0.00%	0.00%
Mixed race or Multiracial (NH)	0	3	6	0.00%	0.97%	2.54%
Hispanic or Latino (any race)	0	4	0	0.00%	1.29%	0.00%
Total	388	310	236	100.00%	100.00%	100.00%

=== 2010 census ===
As of the 2010 United States census, there were 310 people living in the town. The racial makeup of the town was 68.7% Black, 29.0% White and 1.0% from two or more races. 1.3% were Hispanic or Latino of any race.

As of the census of 2000, there were 388 people, 141 households, and 105 families living in the town. The population density was 332.8 inhabitants per square mile (128.5/km^{2}). There were 150 housing units at an average density of 128.7 per square mile (49.7/km^{2}). The racial makeup of the town was 60.57% African American, 38.92% White and 0.52% Asian.

There were 141 households, out of which 29.8% had children under the age of 18 living with them, 44.7% were married couples living together, 22.7% had a female householder with no husband present, and 25.5% were non-families. 24.8% of all households were made up of individuals, and 11.3% had someone living alone who was 65 years of age or older. The average household size was 2.75 and the average family size was 3.29.

In the town, the population was spread out, with 32.2% under the age of 18, 9.3% from 18 to 24, 25.5% from 25 to 44, 20.1% from 45 to 64, and 12.9% who were 65 years of age or older. The median age was 34 years. For every 100 females, there were 86.5 males. For every 100 females age 18 and over, there were 81.4 males.

The median income for a household in the town was $23,816, and the median income for a family was $25,000. Males had a median income of $21,667 versus $13,571 for females. The per capita income for the town was $10,022. About 34.9% of families and 44.3% of the population were below the poverty line, including 65.0% of those under age 18 and 14.3% of those age 65 or over.

== Education ==
It is in the Greenwood-Leflore School District. Its high school is Amanda Elzy High School.

The town was served by the Leflore County School District. Effective July 1, 2019, this district consolidated into the Greenwood-Leflore School District.

== Notable people ==
- Means Johnston, Jr., admiral in the United States Navy
- Ben Jones, race car driver
- Woodrow Stanley, Michigan state politician
