= Gerald Glass =

American basketball player (born 1967)

Personal information
- Born: November 12, 1967 (age 59) Greenwood, Mississippi, U.S.
- Listed height: 6 ft 5 in (1.96 m)
- Listed weight: 221 lb (100 kg)

Career information
- High school: Amanda Elzy (Greenwood, Mississippi)
- College: Delta State (1985–1987); Ole Miss (1988–1990)
- NBA draft: 1990: 1st round, 20th overall pick
- Drafted by: Minnesota Timberwolves
- Playing career: 1990–1999
- Position: Shooting guard / small forward
- Number: 22, 4, 25, 35

Career history
- 1990–1992: Minnesota Timberwolves
- 1992–1993: Detroit Pistons
- 1993–1994: La Crosse Catbirds
- 1994–1995: Jcoplastic Napoli
- 1995–1996: New Jersey Nets
- 1996: Charlotte Hornets
- 1996–1997: CSP Limoges
- 1998–1999: Hapoel Holon

Career highlights
- 2× First-team All-SEC (1989, 1990)

Career NBA statistics
- Points: 1,553 (7.7 ppg)
- Rebounds: 512 (2.5 rpg)
- Assists: 298 (1.5 apg)
- Stats at NBA.com
- Stats at Basketball Reference

Gerald Damon Glass (born November 12, 1967) is an American former professional basketball player.

Graduating from Amanda Elzy High School in Greenwood at the age of sixteen, Glass went to Delta State University. Alcorn State University coach Davey Whitney called Glass the best player in Mississippi.

Glass played for two years at Delta State University and then transferred to the University of Mississippi where he placed fourth in the nation in scoring as a junior. He finished his career, after just two seasons, as the school's sixth leading all-time scorer. Glass was referred to as "World Class Glass" at Ole Miss. He played against LSU's Chris Jackson.

He was selected by the Minnesota Timberwolves with the 20th overall pick in the 1990 NBA draft. As a rookie, Glass set a Timberwolves franchise record for a reserve with 32 points off the bench versus the Los Angeles Lakers. Glass also played for the Detroit Pistons, New Jersey Nets and Charlotte Hornets in four NBA seasons from 1990–1996. His best season as a pro was in 1991–92 for the Timberwolves, when he appeared in 75 games averaging 11.5 points per game.

In 2004, Gerald Glass was honored by Chick-fil-A as part of their SEC Basketball Legends, along with LSU coach Dale Brown, University of Alabama player Derrick McKey, University of Tennessee sharpshooter Dale Ellis, University of Kentucky player Dan Issel, and Auburn's Charles Barkley.

After a year with Andy Kennedy's coaching staff at Ole Miss, Glass became the head coach at his high school alma mater. He later was the head boys basketball coach at Madison Central High School in Madison, Mississippi for 2 seasons.

== Personal life ==
Glass is a relative of fellow basketball player, Earnest Ross.
