= L.C. Green =

American singer

- Born: L.C. Greene; October 23, 1921; Minter City, Mississippi, United States
- Died: August 24, 1985 (aged 63) Pontiac, Michigan, United States
- Genres: Blues
- Occupations: Guitarist, singer, songwriter
- Instruments: Guitar, vocals
- Years active: 1940s–1950s
- Labels: Dot Records, Von Records

L.C. Greene (October 23, 1921 – August 24, 1985), better known as L.C. Green, was an American blues guitarist, singer and songwriter.

He released four singles in 1952 and 1953 for Dot Records and Von Records, including one of the earlier versions of "Come Back Sugar Mama"

AllMusic noted that "vocally and for his repertoire, L.C. Greene, whose records were issued without the final ‘e’ to his name, was indebted to Sonny Boy Williamson I. His amplified guitar playing is clearly Mississippi Delta-derived, but probably owes something to the popularity of fellow Detroit blues singer John Lee Hooker".

== Life and career ==
Greene was born in Minter City, Mississippi.

In 1952, he and his cousin Walter Mitchell went to Gallatin, Tennessee, to record eight sides for the record producer Joe Von Battle. Mitchell sang on two of the tracks, "Little Machine" (written by Sonny Boy Williamson) and "Come Back Sugar Mama", but his main input was his harmonica accompaniment of Green's vocal and guitar work. The resultant work was released on three single by Dot Records in 1952 and 1953, and another was issued by Von Records in 1953. The shoestring nature of Von Battle's enterprise probably contributed to a lack of promotion and exposure for Green. He was further hampered by the fact that although his guitar playing equalled that of John Lee Hooker, he could not match his rival in commercial songwriting ability.

The compilation album Blues Guitar Killers! Detroit 1950's, released in 1977, contains six tracks recorded by Green and Sam Kelly in the mid-1950s in Detroit, Michigan, again produced by Von Battle: ".38 Pistol Blues", "Mary Ann Blues", "Goin' to the River" (take 2), "Hastings Street Boogie", "Things Is Goin' So Tough Today", and "Shine My Light". Three of Green's tracks were included in the 2010 compilation album Let Me Tell You About the Blues: The Evolution of Detroit Blues.

Green died in Pontiac, Michigan, in August 1985, aged 63. An obituary written by Jim O'Neal was printed in Living Blues magazine, issue 68, in 1986.

Green was one of several notable blues guitarists who came from Leflore County, Mississippi. Other natives and one-time residents of the county were (in alphabetical order) David "Honeyboy" Edwards, Guitar Slim, Luther "Guitar Junior" Johnson, Robert Johnson, Rubin Lacey, Furry Lewis, Tommy McClennan, Dion Payton, Robert Petway, Brewer Phillips, Fenton Robinson, Hubert Sumlin, and Hound Dog Taylor.

== Discography ==
=== Singles ===
| Year | Title | Record label |
|---|---|---|
| 1952 | "When the Sun Is Shining" / "Hold Me in Your Arms" | Dot Records |
| 1952 | "Little School Girl" / "Remember Way Back" | Dot Records |
| 1953 | "Little Machine" / "Come Back Sugar Mama" | Doc Records |
| 1953 | "Going Down to the River Blues" / "Ramblin Around Blues" (Sam Kelly) | Von Records |
