= Willie Perkins Sr. =

American politician (born 1952)

Willie Perkins

Member of the Mississippi House of Representatives from the 32nd district
- In office 1994 – March 18, 2019
- Succeeded by: Solomon Osborne

Personal details
- Born: October 21, 1952 (age 73) Leflore County, Mississippi, U.S.
- Party: Democratic

Willie J. Perkins Sr. (born October 21, 1952) is an American politician who served as a member of the Mississippi House of Representatives from 1994 to 2019. He is a member of the Democratic party.
