= Lusia Harris =

American basketball player (1955–2022)

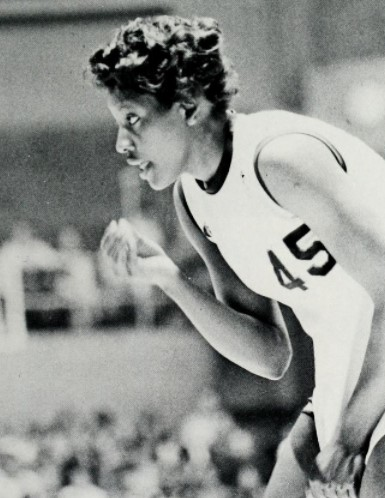
- Harris as a senior at Delta State

Personal information
- Born: February 10, 1955 Minter City, Mississippi, U.S.
- Died: January 18, 2022 (aged 66) Mound Bayou, Mississippi, U.S.
- Listed height: 6 ft 3 in (1.91 m)
- Listed weight: 185 lb (84 kg)

Career information
- High school: Amanda Elzy (near Greenwood, Mississippi)
- College: Delta State (1973–1977)
- NBA draft: 1977: 7th round, 137th overall pick
- Drafted by: New Orleans Jazz
- Playing career: 1979–1980
- Position: Center

Career history
- 1979–1980: Houston Angels

Career highlights
- 3× AIAW champion (1975–1977); 3× AIAW Tournament MVP (1975–1977); 3x Kodak All-American (1975–1977); Honda Sports Award for basketball (1977); Broderick Cup (1977)
- Stats at Basketball Reference
- Stats at Basketball Reference
- Basketball Hall of Fame
- Women's Basketball Hall of Fame
Medals
Representing United States
Women's basketball
Pan American Games
Gold medal – first place	1975 Mexico City	Team competition
Olympic Games
Silver medal – second place	1976 Montreal	Team competition

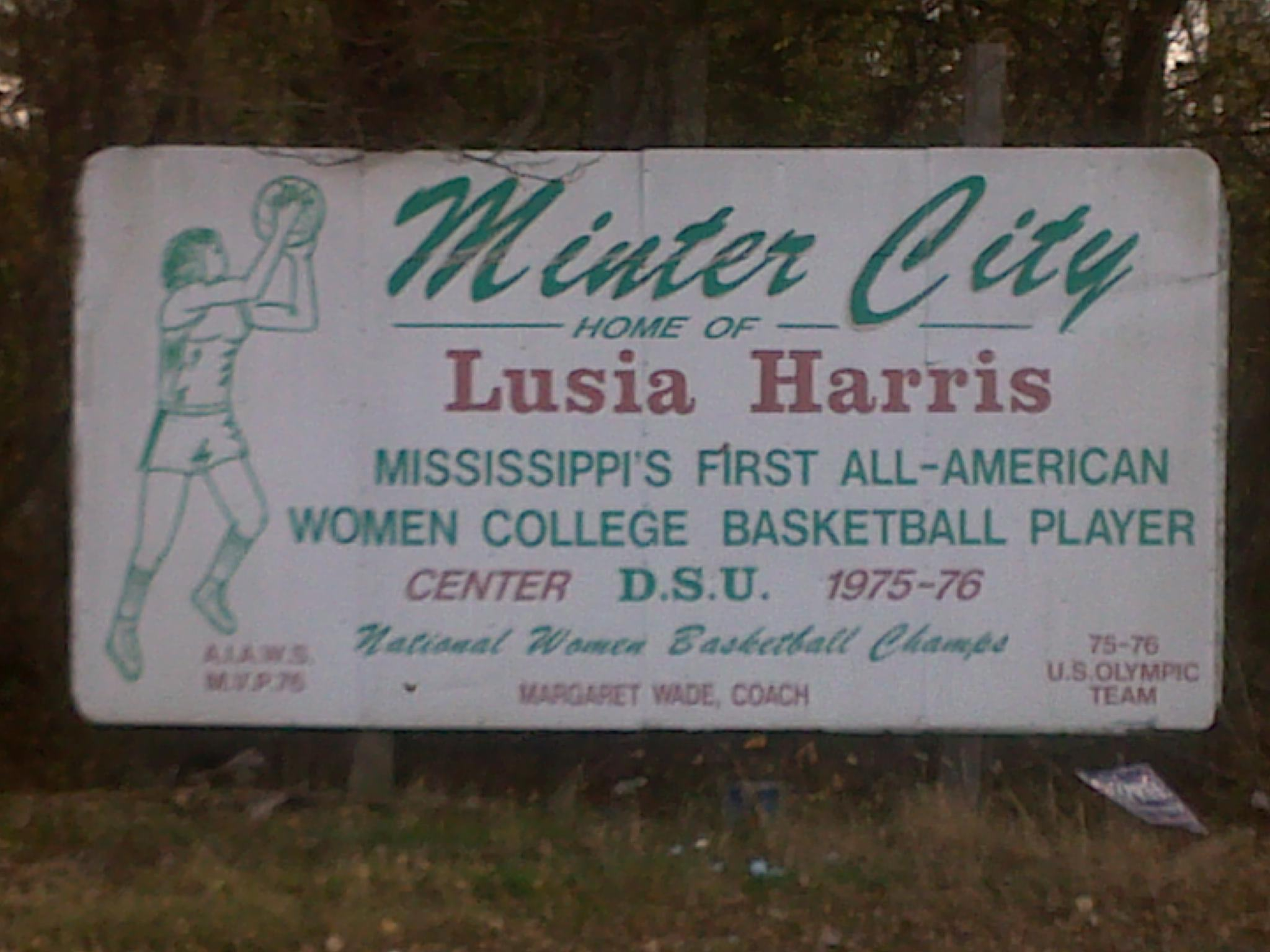
Sign along Highway 49 East recognizing Minter City as the hometown of Lusia Harris

Lusia Mae Harris (February 10, 1955 – January 18, 2022) was an American professional basketball player. Harris is considered to be one of the pioneers of women's basketball. She played for Delta State University and won three consecutive Association for Intercollegiate Athletics for Women (AIAW) National Championships, the predecessors to the National Collegiate Athletic Association (NCAA) championships, from 1975 to 1977. On the international level, she represented the United States' national team. She was on the team which won the gold medal in the 1975 Pan American Games. In addition, she was a member of the team which won the silver medal in the 1976 Olympic Games, the first women's basketball tournament in the Olympic Games. She played professional basketball with the Houston Angels of the Women's Professional Basketball League (WBL) and was the first and only woman ever to be officially drafted by the National Basketball Association (NBA). For her achievements, Harris was inducted to the Naismith Memorial Basketball Hall of Fame and Women's Basketball Hall of Fame.

== Early life ==
Lusia Mae Harris was born in Minter City, Mississippi, to Ethel Harris and Willie Harris, a sharecropper in the cotton fields. She was the fourth of five daughters and the tenth of eleven children, all of whom attended Amanda Elzy High School near Greenwood, Mississippi. All of her brothers and one of her older sisters, Janie, also played basketball.

Harris played basketball under coach Conway Stewart in high school. She won the most valuable player award three years in a row, served as team captain, and made the state All-Star team . She scored a school record 46 points in one game and led her school to the state tournament in Jackson, Mississippi.

After her high school graduation, she had planned to attend Alcorn State University, which did not have a women's basketball team. However, she was recruited by Melvin Hemphill to play for Margaret Wade, who was restarting a collegiate women's team at Delta State University in Cleveland, Mississippi. She attended school on a combination of academic scholarships and work study funds, since this was prior to Title IX.

== College career ==
In her first year at Delta State, 1973–74, Harris helped the Lady Statesmen to a 16–2 record. However, they finished third in the regional tournament and failed to qualify for the national tournament.

In the 1974–75 season, the Lady Statesmen qualified for the national tournament at Harrisonburg, Virginia. They went all the way to the final, where they met the Mighty Macs of Immaculata University who had won the last three consecutive AIAW championships. In the final, Harris scored 32 points and recorded 16 rebounds to lead Delta State past Immaculata 90–81. The 1975 championship game was televised nationally (albeit delayed). This was the first year that women's basketball games were nationally televised by a major network. That season, Delta State went undefeated with a 28–0 record, the only undefeated college basketball season that year (men or women). Harris scored a total of 138 points and 63 rebounds in four games at the national tournament and was named as the tournament's most valuable player.

In the 1975–76 season, Delta State and Immaculata met again in the national tournament final. Harris again led Delta State with 30 points and 18 rebounds in a 69–64 victory. That season, she led the nation in scoring with 1,060 points and 31.2 points per game average, including a 58-point game against Tennessee Tech.

In her senior, 1976–77, season, Delta State played a game in the Madison Square Garden in which Harris scored 47 points. This was one of the first women's basketball games ever played there. In 1977, Delta State went to the national tournament final for the third year in a row. In the final, Harris achieved 23 points and 16 rebounds as Delta State defeated Louisiana State University 68–55 for their third consecutive national title.

Harris was named the national tournament's most valuable player; she was also named to the All-American first team during Delta State's three winning seasons. Her college career record was 109–6, and included victories over later NCAA Division I powerhouses such as Immaculata University, University of Tennessee, Baylor University, University of Mississippi, Louisiana State University and Louisiana Tech University. Harris finished her college career with 2,981 points and 1,662 rebounds, averaging 25.9 points and 14.5 rebounds per game. She also graduated holding fifteen of eighteen of Delta State's team, single game, and career records. In 1977, she won the inaugural Honda Sports Award for basketball, as well as the Broderick Cup, an award for outstanding female athletes in college.

During her tenure at Delta State, Harris was the only African American player on the team.

=== Delta State statistics ===
Legend
GP	Games played	GS	Games started	MPG	Minutes per game
FG%	Field goal percentage	3P%	3-point field goal percentage	FT%	Free throw percentage
RPG	Rebounds per game	APG	Assists per game	SPG	Steals per game
BPG	Blocks per game	PPG	Points per game	**Bold**	Career high

Year	Team	GP	Points	FG%	FT%	RPG	PPG
1974	Delta State	NA					
1975	Delta State	NA					
1976	Delta State	34	1060	61.9%	NA	15.1	31.2
1977	Delta State	NA					
Career		115	2981	63.3%	66.3%	14.5	25.9

== National team career ==
In 1975, Harris was selected to the United States national team in the FIBA World Championship for Women in Colombia and the Pan American Games in Mexico City, Mexico. She teamed up with high school star Nancy Lieberman and fellow college stars Ann Meyers and Pat Head. In the FIBA World Championship, the United States compiled a 4–3 record and finished in eighth place. In the Pan American Games, the United States team went unbeaten in seven games to win the gold medal, their first win since 1963. They averaged 86.7 points per game with an average winning margin of 34.4.

The following year, Harris was selected to represent the United States in the 1976 Summer Olympics in Montreal, Canada, the first women's basketball tournament in the Olympic Games. She used the number seven on her Olympics jersey. She teamed up with most of her teammates in the 1975 Pan American Games, including Lieberman, Meyers and Head. In the opening game against Japan, Harris scored the first ever points in women's Olympic basketball tournament. The United States team won three games and lost two games against Japan and the Soviet Union. The Soviet Union team went undefeated and won the gold medal, while the United States team won the silver medal. Harris played in all five games, averaging 15.2 points and 7.0 rebounds per game.

== Professional career ==
In the seventh round of the 1977 NBA draft, the New Orleans Jazz selected Harris with the 137th pick overall. She became the second woman ever drafted by an NBA team, after Denise Long, who was selected by the San Francisco Warriors in the 1969 draft. However, the league voided the Warriors' selection, thus Harris became the first and only woman ever officially drafted. Harris did not express an interest to play in the NBA and declined to try out for the Jazz. It was later revealed that she was pregnant at the time, which made her unable to attend the Jazz's training camp. She was selected ahead of 33 male players, including the Jazz's eighth round selection, Dave Speicher from the University of Toledo.

Harris never played in the NBA or any other men's basketball league but played professional basketball briefly in the 1979–80 season with the Houston Angels of the Women's Professional Basketball League (WBL). She was initially picked as the number one free agent by the Angels in 1978, the league's inaugural season.

== Personal life and death ==
Harris graduated from Delta State University with a bachelor's degree in health, physical education and recreation in 1977. After graduation, she worked for Delta State as an admissions counselor and assistant basketball coach. She earned a master's degree in education from Delta State in 1984. After leaving the assistant coaching post at Delta State, she served as the head coach at Texas Southern University in Houston for two years. She then returned to her native Mississippi where she worked as a high school teacher and coach at her alma mater Amanda Elzy High School in Greenwood, at the Greenville Public School District, and at Ruleville Central High School.

Harris married George E. Stewart on February 4, 1977. They had four children, two sons and twin daughters. She was a member of Delta Sigma Theta sorority.

Harris died at a therapy facility in Mound Bayou, Mississippi, on January 18, 2022, at age 66.

== Legacy ==
For her achievements and contributions to the Delta State University, Harris was inducted to the Delta State's Hall of Fame in 1983. In 1992, she became the first African-American woman inducted in the Naismith Memorial Basketball Hall of Fame. In 1999, Harris, along with her college coach, Margaret Wade, and her teammates in the national team, Nancy Lieberman, Ann Meyers and Pat Head, were among the 26 inaugural inductees to the Women's Basketball Hall of Fame. She has also been named to the International Women's Sports Hall of Fame.

The Queen of Basketball, a film about Harris, won the 2022 Academy Award for Best Documentary (Short Subject); it was produced and directed by Canadian filmmaker Ben Proudfoot, with Shaquille O'Neal and Stephen Curry as executive producers. It was released June 10, 2021, seven months before her death.
