= Greenwood Public School District (Mississippi) =

School district in Mississippi, United States

The Greenwood Public School District was a public school district based in Greenwood, Mississippi, United States.

Effective July 1, 2019 the Greenwood and the Leflore County School District consolidated into the Greenwood-Leflore School District.

== History ==
In 1993, white parents in the Greenwood district made plans to look for majority white private schools after the district leadership proposed having a centralized middle school for all students.

David Jordan, a member of the Mississippi Senate, criticized the upcoming Greenwood-Leflore merger since the Leflore district's performance in state tests was worse than that of the Greenwood district; their respective grades from the Mississippi Department of Education circa 2016-2017 were F and C. Circa 2016 the rating of the Greenwood district was D. Unlike most state-mandated school district consolidations, in which a larger district absorbs a smaller district, in this instance two districts of roughly equal size are merging; in 2016 the Greenwood district had 2,846 students while the Leflore district had 2,405 students. Adam Ganucheau and Zachary Oren Smith of Mississippi Today described both districts as being "large".

== Schools ==
- Greenwood High School (Grades 9-12)
- Greenwood Middle School (Grades 7-8)
- Bankston Elementary (Grades K-6)
- Davis Elementary (Grades K-6)
- Threadgill Elementary (Grades K-6)
- Threadgill Primary School (Greenwood). It opened in 1935 as W.C. Williams Elementary School. Enrollment was 400 in 2015. In 2015 the closure of the school was proposed. On May 22, 2015, the school board voted to close it, but in 2017 it reopened for grades Pre-Kindergarten-1. By 2019 the school adopted its current name.

== Demographics ==
Around 1988 Greenwood High School was almost split evenly between black and white students. In 1998 it was 92% black. Greenwood Junior High School was 97% black. Many white students were instead going to the private school Pillow Academy.

The district had 2,846 students in 2016, and 2,634 in the 2018-2019 school year.

=== 2006-07 school year ===
There were a total of 3,110 students enrolled in the Greenwood Public School District during the 2006-2007 school year. The gender makeup of the district was 51% female and 49% male. The racial makeup of the district was 91.64% African American, 7.43% White, 0.48% Hispanic, and 0.45% Asian. All of the district's students were eligible to receive free or price-subsidized lunch.

=== Previous school years ===
School Year	Enrollment	Gender Makeup		Racial Makeup				
School Year	Enrollment	Female	Male	Asian	African American	Hispanic	Native American	White
2005-06	3,152	50%	50%	0.48%	91.18%	0.48%	–	7.87%
2004-05	3,211	49%	51%	0.47%	89.97%	0.34%	–	9.22%
2003-04	3,422	49%	51%	0.29%	88.84%	0.15%	0.06%	10.67%
2002-03	3,486	50%	50%	0.29%	88.73%	0.20%	–	10.79%

== Accountability statistics ==
	2006-07	2005-06	2004-05	2003-04	2002-03
District Accreditation Status	Accredited	Accredited	Accredited	Accredited	Accredited
School Performance Classifications
Level 5 (Superior Performing) Schools	1	1	0	2	1
Level 4 (Exemplary) Schools	0	1	1	2	0
Level 3 (Successful) Schools	4	4	4	1	2
Level 2 (Under Performing) Schools	1	0	1	1	2
Level 1 (Low Performing) Schools	0	0	0	0	1
Not Assigned	0	0	0	0	0

== School uniforms ==
Students at all schools are required to wear school uniforms. The policy was established in the 2009-2010 school year.

== See also ==
- List of school districts in Mississippi
