= Leflore County School District =

Public school district headquartered in Mississippi, United States

Coordinates: 33.526325°N 90.215880°W

The Leflore County School District (LCSD) was a public school district headquartered in Greenwood, Mississippi, United States.

The district served areas in Leflore County outside of the City of Greenwood, including the city of Itta Bena, the towns of Morgan City, Schlater and Sidon, as well as the community of Minter City. Also some portions of Greenwood were in the district, as well as Mississippi Valley State, which contains faculty housing and residential apartments of Mississippi Valley State University.

Effective July 1, 2019 this district and the Greenwood Public School District consolidated into the Greenwood-Leflore School District.

== History ==
In October 2013, the State of Mississippi took control of the school district. The second person appointed by state as the head of the school district was Ilean Richards.

Circa 2016, the rating of the Greenwood district was D. Unlike most state-mandated school district consolidations, in which a larger district absorbs a smaller district, in this instance two districts of roughly equal size merged; in 2016 the Leflore district had 2,405 students and the Greenwood district had 2,846. Adam Ganucheau and Zachary Oren Smith of Mississippi Today described both districts as being "large".

David Jordan, a member of the Mississippi Senate, criticized the upcoming Greenwood-Leflore merger since the Leflore district's performance in state tests was worse than that of the Greenwood district; their respective grades from the Mississippi Department of Education circa 2016-2017 were F and C.

Richards resigned in 2017, and James Johnson-Waldington became the district head.

In 2019 the Leflore County and Greenwood school districts were merged and became the Greenwood-Leflore Consolidated School District to help integrate and provide equal resources to all students.

== Schools ==
High schools (9-12):

- Amanda Elzy High School (Unincorporated area)
- Leflore County High School (Itta Bena)

4-8 schools:

- East Elementary School (Unincorporated area), formerly East Middle School. Converted into East Elementary School in 2013: Elzy Elementary's students in pre-Kindergarten through 5th grade moved to East Elementary while grades 6 through 8 moved from East Middle to Elzy Junior High.

Middle schools (6-8):

- Amanda Elzy Junior High School - Formed in the former Amanda Elzy Elementary School in 2013.
- Leflore County Junior High School - Formed as its own school in 2013.

Primary schools:

K-6
- Leflore County Elementary School (Itta Benna)
K-3
- Claudine F. Brown Elementary School (Unincorporated area)

- It is about 5 miles (8.0 km) north of Sidon.

Closed before district dissolution
- Amanda Elzy Elementary School (Unincorporated area) - In 2013 the building was converted into Amanda Elzy Junior High School.
- T.Y. Fleming School (K-6) Unincorporated area, Minter City area

- 2006 National Blue Ribbon School. In 2009 the school closed. The editor of the Greenwood Commonwealth criticized the closure.

Other

- Leflore County Vo-Tech Center (Unincorporated area)

== Demographics ==
Leflore district had 2,405 students in 2016, About 2,400 students circa 2017, and 2,167 in the 2018–2019 school year.

=== 2006-07 school year ===
There were a total of 2,936 students enrolled in the Leflore County School District during the 2006–2007 school year. The gender makeup of the district was 49% female and 51% male. The racial makeup of the district was 96.46% African American, 1.36% White, and 2.18% Hispanic. All of the district's students were eligible to receive free lunch.

=== Previous school years ===
School Year	Enrollment	Gender Makeup		Racial Makeup				
School Year	Enrollment	Female	Male	Asian	African; American	Hispanic	Native; American	White
2005-06	3,053	49%	51%	–	96.43%	1.44%	–	2.13%
2004-05	3,043	49%	51%	–	96.45%	1.45%	–	2.10%
2003-04	2,996	49%	51%	0.03%	96.83%	1.44%	–	1.70%
2002-03	3,050	49%	51%	0.03%	96.79%	1.28%	–	1.90%

== Accountability statistics ==
	2006-07	2005-06	2004-05	2003-04	2002-03
District Accreditation Status	Accredited	Accredited	Accredited	Accredited	Accredited
School Performance Classifications
Level 5 (Superior Performing) Schools	2	2	2	2	0
Level 4 (Exemplary) Schools	1	0	0	1	2
Level 3 (Successful) Schools	0	2	3	2	1
Level 2 (Under Performing) Schools	4	3	2	2	4
Level 1 (Low Performing) Schools	0	0	0	0	0
Not Assigned	0	0	0	0	0

== See also ==
- List of school districts in Mississippi
