= Sidon, Mississippi =

- Town
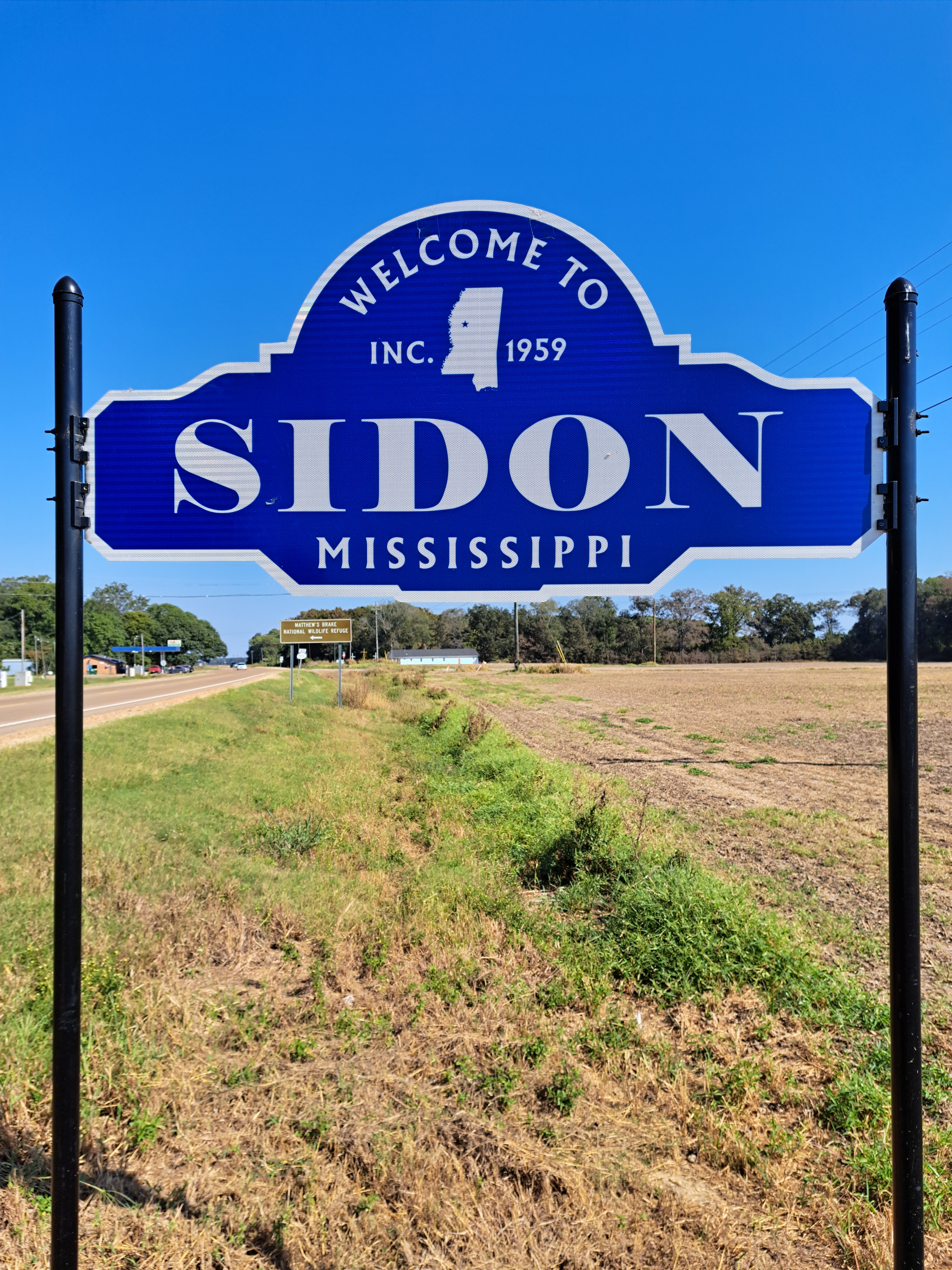

- Location of Sidon, Mississippi
- Coordinates: 33°24′29″N 90°12′29″W
- Country: United States
- State: Mississippi
- County: Leflore

Area
  - Total: 0.12 sq mi (0.32 km^{2})
  - Land: 0.12 sq mi (0.32 km^{2})
  - Water: 0 sq mi (0.00 km^{2})
- Elevation: 128 ft (39 m)

Population (2020)
  - Total: 311
  - Density: 2,506.8/sq mi (967.87/km^{2})
- Time zone: UTC-6 (Central (CST))
  - Summer (DST): UTC-5 (CDT)
- FIPS code: 28-67840
- GNIS feature ID: 2407334

Sidon is a town in Leflore County, Mississippi, United States. As of the 2020 census, Sidon had a population of 311. It is part of the Greenwood, Mississippi micropolitan area.

== Geography ==
According to the United States Census Bureau, the town has a total area of 0.1-square-mile (0.26 km^{2}), all land.

== Demographics ==
Historical population
Census	Pop.	Note	%±
1890	119		—
1900	148		24.4%
1910	391		164.2%
1920	370		−5.4%
1930	320		−13.5%
1940	418		30.6%
1950	361		−13.6%
1960	410		13.6%
1970	348		−15.1%
1980	450		29.3%
1990	596		32.4%
2000	672		12.8%
2010	509		−24.3%
2020	311		−38.9%
U.S. Decennial Census

=== Racial and ethnic composition ===
Sidon town, Mississippi – Racial and ethnic composition Note: the US Census treats Hispanic/Latino as an ethnic category. This table excludes Latinos from the racial categories and assigns them to a separate category. Hispanics/Latinos may be of any race.
Race / Ethnicity (NH = Non-Hispanic)	Pop 2000	Pop 2010	Pop 2020	% 2000	% 2010	% 2020
White alone (NH)	98	26	12	14.58%	5.11%	3.86%
Black or African American alone (NH)	559	477	292	83.18%	93.71%	93.89%
Native American or Alaska Native alone (NH)	0	0	0	0.00%	0.00%	0.00%
Asian alone (NH)	5	1	0	0.74%	0.20%	0.00%
Native Hawaiian or Pacific Islander alone (NH)	0	0	0	0.00%	0.00%	0.00%
Other race alone (NH)	0	0	0	0.00%	0.00%	0.00%
Mixed race or Multiracial (NH)	6	1	4	0.89%	0.20%	1.29%
Hispanic or Latino (any race)	4	4	3	0.60%	0.79%	0.96%
Total	672	509	311	100.00%	100.00%	100.00%

=== 2010 census ===
As of the 2010 United States census, there were 509 people living in the town. The racial makeup of the town was 93.7% Black, 5.1% White, 0.2% Asian and 0.2% from two or more races. 0.8% were Hispanic or Latino of any race.

As of the census of 2000, there were 672 people, 215 households, and 158 families living in the town. The population density was 5,394.7 inhabitants per square mile (2,082.9/km^{2}). There were 220 housing units at an average density of 1,766.1 per square mile (681.9/km^{2}). The racial makeup of the town was 14.88% White, 83.33% African American, 0.89% Asian, and 0.89% from two or more races. Hispanic or Latino of any race were 0.60% of the population.

There were 215 households, out of which 45.1% had children under the age of 18 living with them, 32.6% were married couples living together, 35.3% had a female householder with no husband present, and 26.5% were non-families. 23.7% of all households were made up of individuals, and 7.0% had someone living alone who was 65 years of age or older. The average household size was 3.13 and the average family size was 3.75.

In the town, the population was spread out, with 41.4% under the age of 18, 11.3% from 18 to 24, 28.9% from 25 to 44, 11.0% from 45 to 64, and 7.4% who were 65 years of age or older. The median age was 23 years. For every 100 females, there were 83.6 males. For every 100 females age 18 and over, there were 68.4 males.

The median income for a household in the town was $15,435, and the median income for a family was $14,286. Males had a median income of $28,625 versus $17,083 for females. The per capita income for the town was $6,629. About 48.1% of families and 56.9% of the population were below the poverty line, including 75.3% of those under age 18 and 22.2% of those age 65 or over.

== Transportation ==
Amtrak’s City of New Orleans, which operates between New Orleans and Chicago, passes through the town on CN tracks, but makes no stop. The nearest station is located in Greenwood, 8 miles (13 km) to the north.

== Education ==
It is in the Greenwood-Leflore School District. Claudine Brown Elementary School is about 5 miles (8.0 km) north of Sidon. Residents are zoned to Amanda Elzy High School.

The town was formerly served by the Leflore County School District. Effective July 1, 2019, this district consolidated into the Greenwood-Leflore School District.

== Notable people ==
- Edwards Barham, Louisiana state senator
- Edwin R. Holmes, federal judge
- James Garrott Holmes, Mississippi Supreme Court Justice
- Denise LaSalle, singer
- Viola B. Sanders, Assistant Chief of Naval Personnel for Women
- Frank E. Smith, U.S. congressman

== Gallery ==
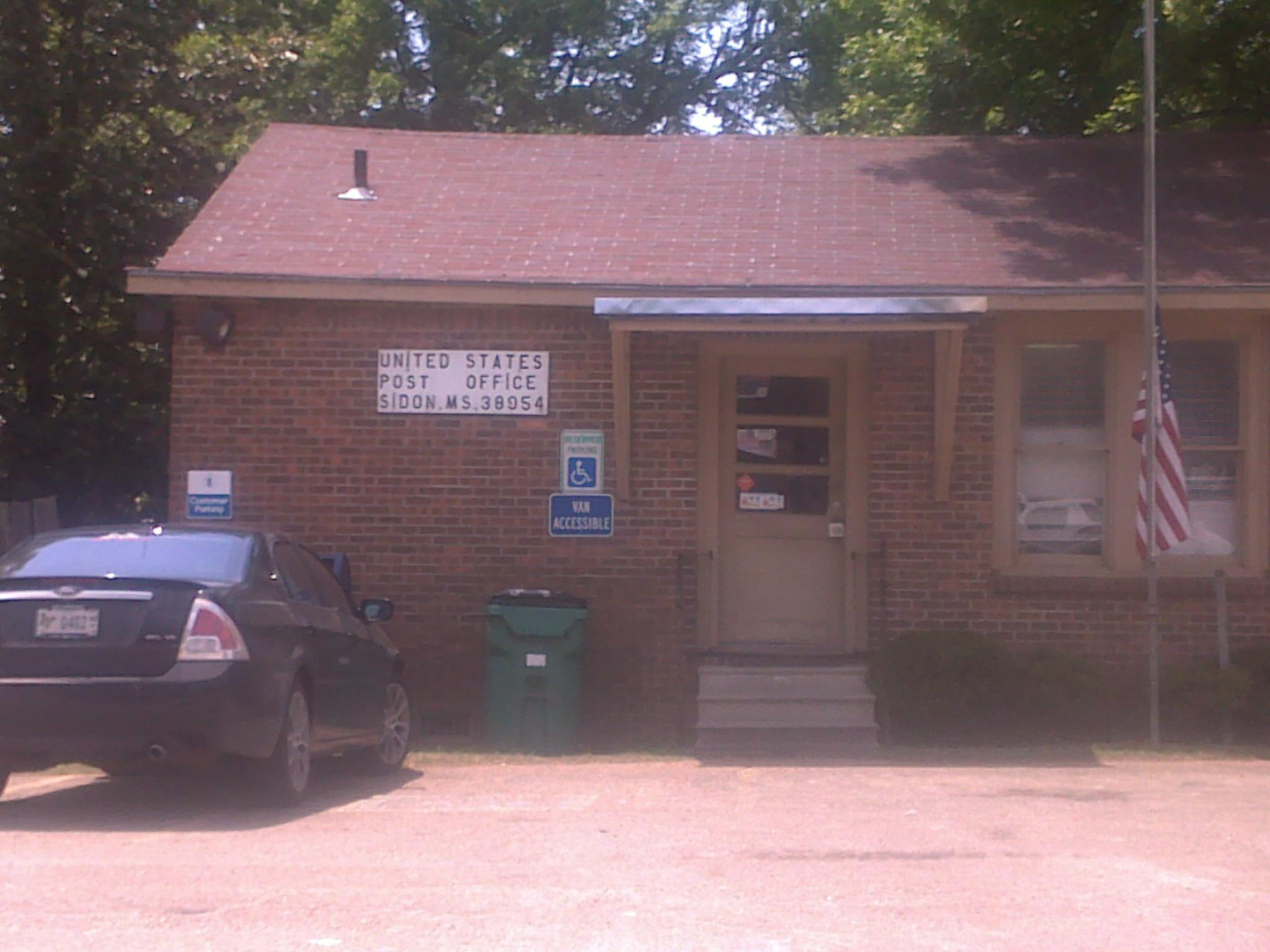
Post Office

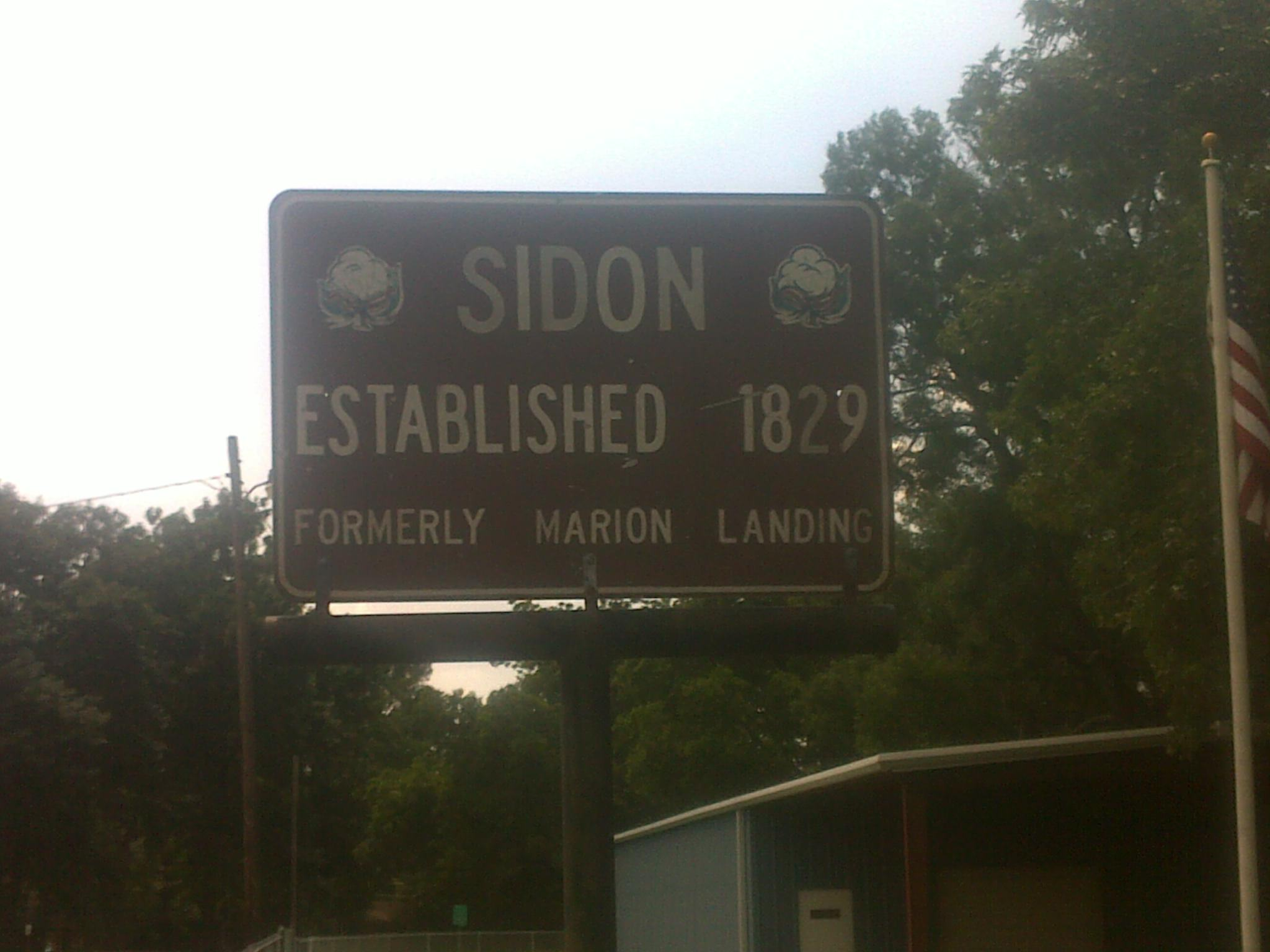
Founding date of the town
