= Amanda Elzy High School =

Location
- Greenwood, Mississippi postal address United States
- Coordinates: 33°30′02″N 90°10′06″W

Information
- Opened: 1959
- School district: Greenwood-Leflore Consolidated School District (2019-); Leflore County School District (-2019)
- Teaching staff: 29.73 (FTE)
- Grades: 9–12
- Enrollment: 387 (2023–2024)
- Student to teacher ratio: 13.02
- Colors: Royal blue and gold
- Team name: Panthers
- Website: aehs.glcsd.org

Amanda Elzy High School (AEHS) is a high school in unincorporated Leflore County, Mississippi, south of Greenwood, and part of the Greenwood-Leflore Consolidated School District.

As of the 2013–2014 school year, it had 488 students in grades 9–12 and 36.37 teachers (full-time equivalent).

Its service area includes Minter City, Money, Sidon, and Schlater.

== History ==
The school was named in 1959 in honor of Amanda Elzy, a pioneering black educator.

It was a part of the Leflore County School District until that district's merger into Greenwood-Leflore Consolidated School District on July 1, 2019.

== Demographics ==
In the 2012–2013 school year, the demographic profile of the student body was 492 black students, 5 Hispanic students and 2 white students.

In 2014, its students were reported as 100% "economically disadvantaged."

== Discipline ==
By 2010 the school began to only issue detentions for physical altercations, with a choice of either Saturdays or after school, instead of all day in-school suspensions.

== Notable alumni ==
- Lusia Harris (1955–2022), basketball player and member of the Women's Basketball Hall of Fame
- Gerald Glass (born 1967), All-SEC (Ole Miss 1989-1990) and professional basketball player. Glass attended Amanda Elzy High School as a student, and then returned as an adult to coach the basketball team to a state championship in the 2011–2012 season.
- Alphonso Ford (1971–2004), basketball player
- Leroy Jones (1950–2021), American football player

== In popular culture ==
The school is mentioned frequently in Richard Rubin's book Confederacy of Silence.
