= Greenwood High School (Mississippi) =

Location
- 1209 Garrard Avenue; Greenwood, MS 38930-5125; United States; 33°30′38″N 90°11′38″W

Information
- Type: Comprehensive public high school
- Motto: Maximizing Student Potential
- School district: Greenwood-Leflore Consolidated School District (2019–); Greenwood Public School District
- Principal: Kevin Pulley
- Teaching staff: 40.84 (FTE)
- Grades: 9-12
- Gender: coed
- Enrollment: 660 (2023–2024)
- Student to teacher ratio: 16.16
- Colors: Maroon and white
- Team name: Bulldogs
- Website: ghs.glcsd.org

Greenwood High School (GHS) is a public high school located in Greenwood, Leflore County, in the U.S. state of Mississippi. The school is part of the Greenwood-Leflore Consolidated School District.

== History ==
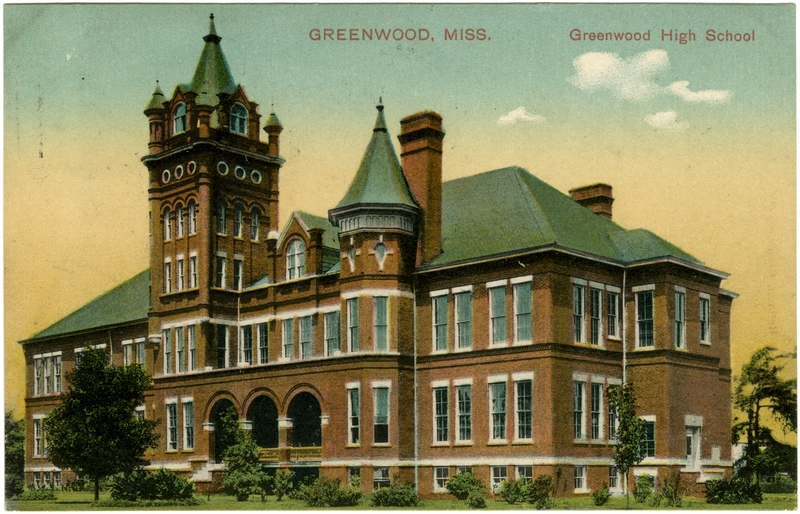
An early 20th century illustration of the former Greenwood High School building

The school was reserved for white students only from its founding until 1969, when two African-American students, Marcel Gulledge and Milbertha Teague, walked past a crowd of jeering students and entered the school. It was a part of the Greenwood Public School District until 2019, when that district merged into Greenwood-Leflore CSD.

=== Location ===
Greenwood, Mississippi, is a town of slightly over 15,000 residents located on the banks of the Yazoo River about 130 miles (210 km) south of Memphis, Tennessee, and about 95 miles (153 km) north of Jackson, Mississippi. The city and county are named after Greenwood Leflore, the designated leader of the Choctaw nation who ceded Mississippi land under pressure of the 1830 Indian Removal Act to the United States government in exchange for a land allotment in today's state of Oklahoma.

=== De Jure segregation years ===
Greenwood was the original home of the White Citizen's Council, a white supremacist organization established in the summer of 1954 in response to a national trend towards racial integration and civil rights for African Americans which culminated in the landmark 1955 Supreme Court decision Brown v. Board of Education.

During this period the town of Greenwood's high school students attended Broad Street High School, the site of today's Threadgill Elementary School — including most notably in its Class of 1955 Academy Award-winning actor Morgan Freeman.

== Academics ==
In 2012 Greenwood High School was attended by nearly 770 students. The school features a student-to-teacher ratio of 17.8 to 1. The school nickname is the Bulldogs.

According to U.S. News & World Report, for the 2009–10 school year Greenwood High School's student body of 719 students was 98 percent of African-American ethnicity and about 1 percent White American.

Greenwood High School was one of the first two public high schools in the state of Mississippi to earn accreditation from the Southern Association of Colleges and Schools.

== Demographics ==
Around 1988 Greenwood High School was almost split evenly between black and white students. In 1998 it was 92% black. Many white students were instead going to the private school Pillow Academy.

== Academic performance ==
The Mississippi Department of Education gave the school an "F" grade for the 2013–14 school year. In the period circa 2010–2015 the graduation rate was 67.4%.

== Notable alumni ==
- Mario Branch, former professional football player
- Byron De La Beckwith, assassin of civil rights leader Medgar Evers
- Carlos Emmons, former professional football player, New York Giants, Philadelphia Eagles, and Pittsburgh Steelers
- Webb Franklin, former U.S. Representative from Mississippi's 2nd congressional district
- Kent Hull, former professional football player, Buffalo Bills
- Cleo Lemon, former professional football player, Jacksonville Jaguars, Miami Dolphins, and San Diego Chargers
- Mulgrew Miller, jazz musician
