= The Greenwood Commonwealth =

Daily newspaper in Greenwood, Mississippi

- Type: Daily newspaper
- Publisher: Tim Kalich
- Founded: 1896
- Headquarters: 329 Hwy. 82 West, Greenwood, MS
- ISSN: 0884-4569 (print); 2833-6763 (web)
- OCLC number: 233143677
- Website: gwcommonwealth.com

The Greenwood Commonwealth is a daily newspaper published in Greenwood, Mississippi. It has been in operation since 1896.

== History ==
The Greenwood Commonwealth was established in 1896. During the early 20th century, James K. Vardaman, who later served as Governor and U.S. Senator for Mississippi, was its editor.

== Operations ==
The newspaper is currently published by Tim Kalich. It produces print and online editions.
