= Greenwood-Leflore Consolidated School District =

School district in Mississippi

Greenwood-Leflore Consolidated School District (GLCSD) is a school district serves Greenwood, Mississippi and the rest of Leflore County. It was established on July 1, 2019, as a merger of the Greenwood Public School District and the Leflore County School District.

The initial superintendent is Dr. Mary Brown. Its projected enrollment as of 2018 was to be over 5,000 students.

== History ==
Upon creation of the consolidated district, no existing schools closed.

== Operations ==
The former Greenwood School District headquarters is the headquarters of the consolidated district, with the superintendent and assistant superintendents housed there. Other officials are divided between that building and the former Leflore County School District offices.

There is one band, mass choir, and snow choir common to all of the schools in the consolidated district.

== Schools ==
9-12 secondary schools

- Leflore County High School (Itta Bena)

High schools (9-12)

- Amanda Elzy High School (Unincorporated area)
- Greenwood High School (Greenwood)

Middle schools/junior high schools (7-8)

- Amanda Elzy Junior High School (Merged with Greenwood Middle 10/20/2025)(Unincorporated area)
- Greenwood Middle School (Greenwood)

Elementary schools (K-6)

- Bankston Elementary School (Pre-K-5th Grade)(Greenwood)
- Leflore County Elementary School(Closed Merged with Greenwood Middle)(Itta Bena)
- Davis Elementary School(Pre-K-5th Grade (Greenwood) - In 1913 the school building was constructed.

2-5 schools

- Threadgill Elementary School (Greenwood)

3-5 schools

- East Elementary School
  - Prior to the 2019 merger it had grades K-5.

K-2 schools

- Claudine F. Brown Elementary School(Closed) (Unincorporated area)
  - It is about 5 miles (8.0 km) north of Sidon.
  - Prior to the 2019 merger it had grades K-4.

PK-1 schools

- Threadgill Primary School (Greenwood)(Closed). It opened in 1935 as W.C. Williams Elementary School. Enrollment was 400 in 2015. In 2015 the closure of the school was proposed. On May 22, 2015, the Greenwood School District school board voted to close it, but in 2017 it reopened for grades Pre-Kindergarten-1. By 2019 the school adopted its current name.

Other

- GLCSD Career & Technical Educational Center (Greenwood)
