= Greenwood, Mississippi =

- City
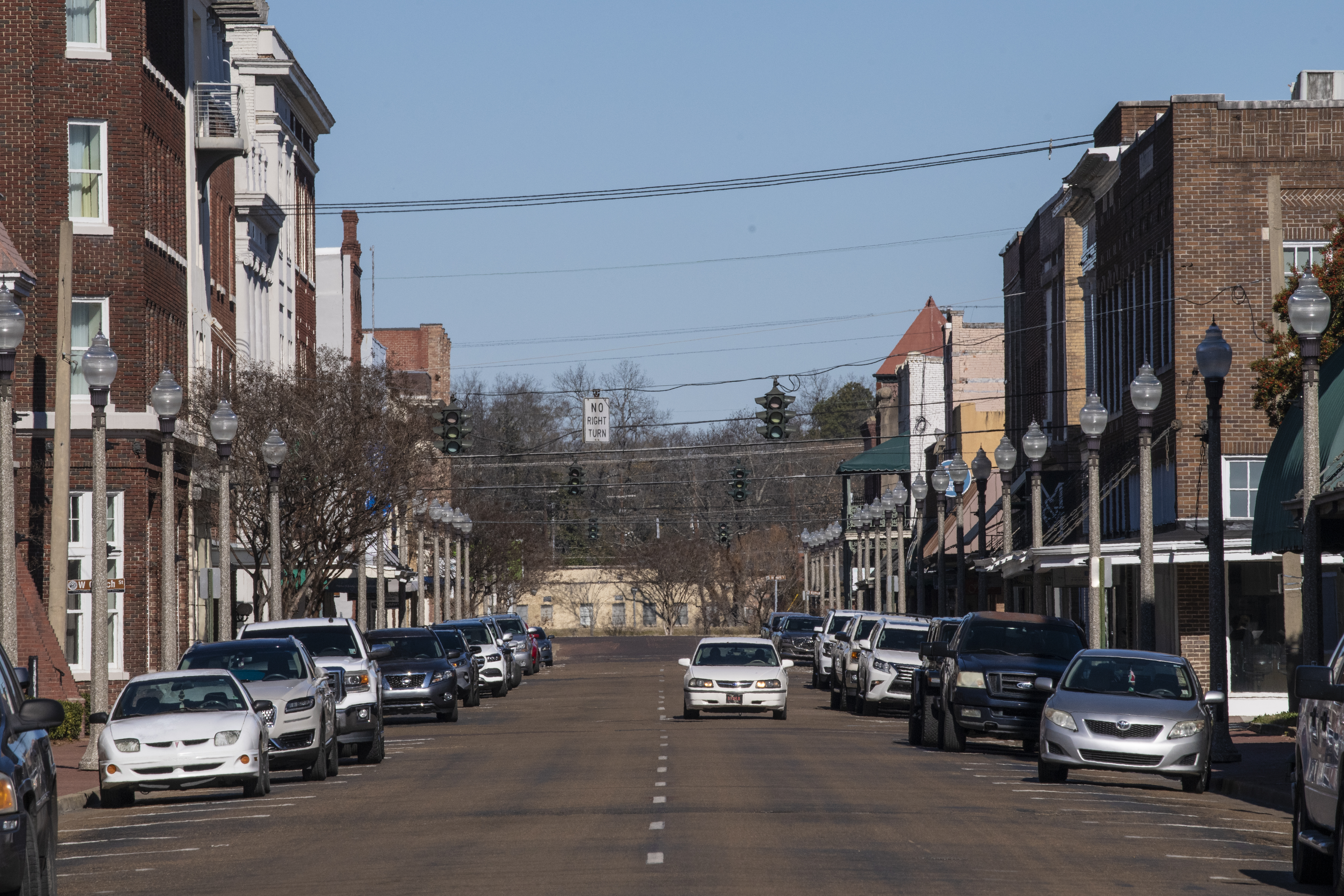
- Howard Street in Greenwood

- Flag Seal

- Location of Greenwood, Mississippi

- Location in the United States
- Coordinates: 33°31′07″N 90°12′02″W
- Country: United States
- State: Mississippi
- County: Leflore

Government
  - Mayor: Kendrick Cox (D)

Area
  - Total: 116.94 sq mi (302.87 km^{2})
  - Land: 116.58 sq mi (301.95 km^{2})
  - Water: 0.36 sq mi (0.92 km^{2})
- Elevation: 128 ft (39 m)

Population (2020)
  - Total: 14,490
  - Density: 1,174.7/sq mi (453.56/km^{2})
- Time zone: UTC−6 (Central (CST))
  - Summer (DST): UTC−5 (CDT)
- ZIP codes: 38930, 38935
- Area code: 662
- FIPS code: 28-29340
- GNIS feature ID: 2403757
- Website: www.greenwoodms.com

Greenwood is a city in and the county seat of Leflore County, Mississippi, United States. It is located approximately 96 miles north of the state capital, Jackson, at the eastern edge of the Mississippi Delta; Memphis, Tennessee is 130 miles to its north. As of the 2020 census, Greenwood had a population of 14,490. It is the principal city of the Greenwood Micropolitan Statistical Area.

The first European-American settlement in the area was established in 1834 next to the Yazoo River. A nearby settlement was founded by Chief Greenwood Leflore. The city was incorporated as "Greenwood" in 1844. It became a center of cotton planting in the 19th century, as it is located in the fertile Mississippi delta, and became a port for shipping cotton to markets along the Mississippi. Railroads built in the 1880s bolstered the local economy, especially the cotton business. In the first half of the 20th century, Cotton growing and processing became largely mechanized, reducing the need for sharecroppers and farmerworkers. Later in the 20th century, some farmers shifted to corn and soybeans.

Sally Humphreys Gwin planted 1,000 oak trees along the city's Grand Boulevard. Kwame Ture gave his "Black Power" speech in Greenwood in 1966.

== History ==
Howard Street

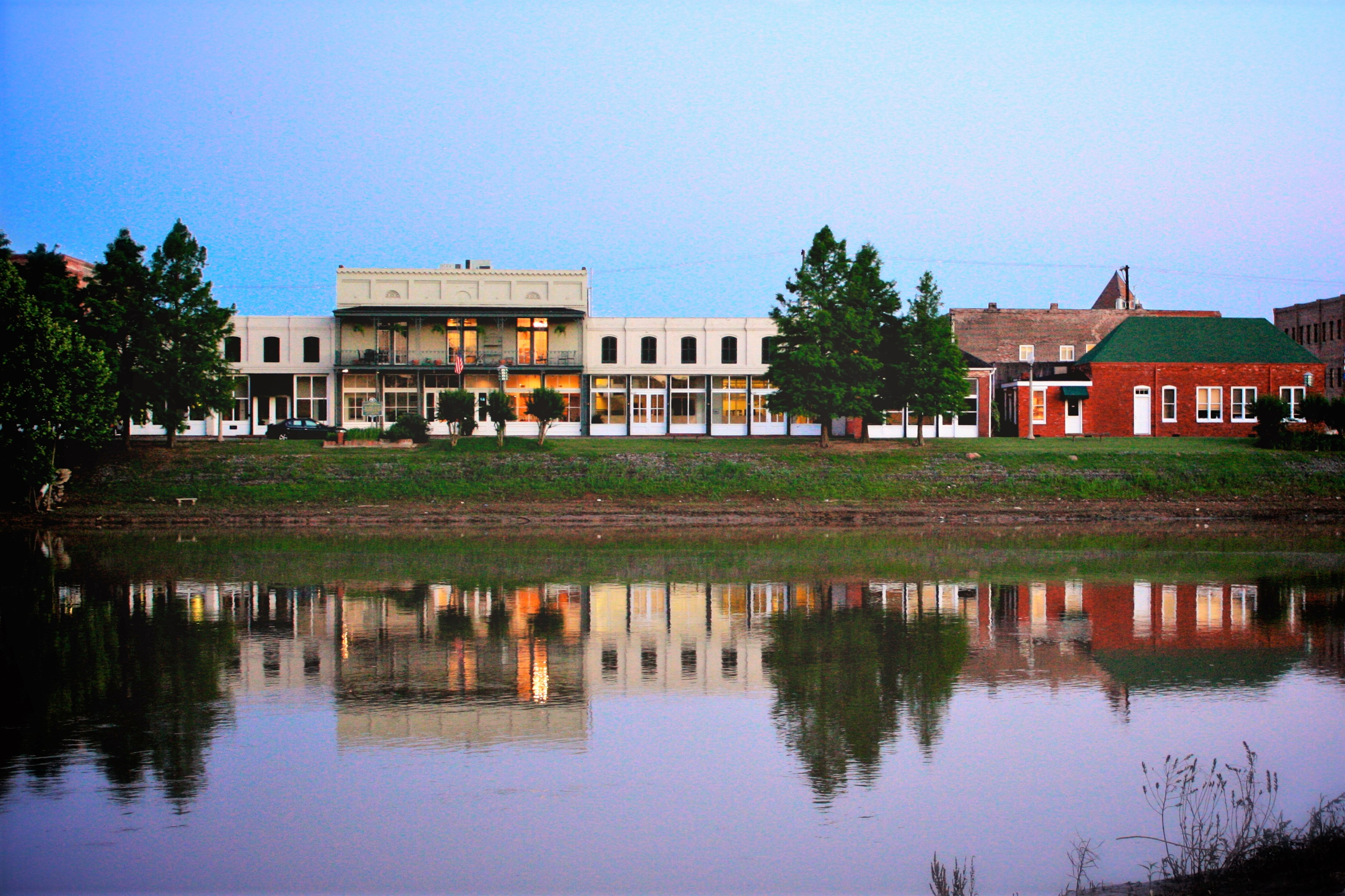
Front Street buildings along the Yazoo River

=== European settlement ===
The first settlement by European-Americans in the area, next to the Yazoo River, was a trading post founded in 1834 named William's Landing. Three miles up the river was another settlement founded by Chief Greenwood Leflore in 1850 called Point Leflore. Soon an exchange of some parcels of land were made by Leflore for a commitment from the townsmen to maintain roads to the hilly area to the east and to some more established settlements to the northwest.

Governor A.G. Brown chartered the settlement as "Greenwood" in 1844, naming it after the chief. During this period, the city began producing a crop much in demand, cotton, due its fertile location in the Mississippi Delta's alluvial plain near the intersection of the Tallahatchie and the Yalobusha rivers, which combine to form the Yazoo. The city became as a shipping point for cotton to markets in New Orleans, Vicksburg, Mississippi, Memphis, Tennessee, and St. Louis, Missouri.

The construction of the Yazoo and Mississippi Valley Railroad and the Georgia Pacific Railway through the city in the 1880s revitalized the local economy and shortened transportation time to markets. Along the banks of the Yazoo, the city's Front Street became a hub for cotton factors and related businesses, and was nicknamed "Cotton Row".

=== 20th century ===
Business was brisk into the 1940s except during the boll weevil infestation in the early 20th century. A sign seen on the city's bridge over the Yazoo river read "World's Largest Inland Long Staple Cotton Market". Growing and processing cotton became mechanized in the first half of the 20th century, and thousands of tenant farmers, farmworkers and sharecroppers in the area were displaced. Later in the 20th century, as textile manufacturing moved out of the U.S., some local farmers began to grow corn and soybeans for animal feed instead of cotton.

The U.S. Chambers of Commerce and the Garden Clubs of America have called city's Grand Boulevard one of America's 10 most beautiful streets. Sally Humphreys Gwin, a founder of the Greenwood Garden Club, planted 1,000 oak trees along the Grand Boulevard. In 1950, Gwin received a citation from the National Congress of the Daughters of the American Revolution for her work in the conservation of trees.

Activist Stokely Carmichael notably gave his "Black Power" speech during a March Against Fear rally which was held in Greenwood on June 16, 1966.

== Geography ==
According to the United States Census Bureau, the city has a total area of 9.5 square miles (25 km^{2}), of which 9.2 square miles (24 km^{2}) is land and 0.3 square miles (0.78 km^{2}) is water.

=== Climate ===
Greenwood has a humid subtropical climate (Köppen Cfa) with long, hot summers and short, mild winters.

Climate data for Greenwood, Mississippi (Greenwood–Leflore Airport), 1991–2020 normals, extremes 1935–present
Month	Jan	Feb	Mar	Apr	May	Jun	Jul	Aug	Sep	Oct	Nov	Dec	Year
Record high °F (°C)	84 (29)	84 (29)	89 (32)	95 (35)	100 (38)	111 (44)	106 (41)	108 (42)	103 (39)	100 (38)	89 (32)	85 (29)	111 (44)
Mean maximum °F (°C)	73.9 (23.3)	76.7 (24.8)	82.8 (28.2)	86.8 (30.4)	91.7 (33.2)	95.0 (35.0)	97.9 (36.6)	98.8 (37.1)	96.0 (35.6)	89.9 (32.2)	81.8 (27.7)	75.7 (24.3)	99.8 (37.7)
Mean daily maximum °F (°C)	54.2 (12.3)	58.8 (14.9)	67.2 (19.6)	75.2 (24.0)	82.9 (28.3)	89.1 (31.7)	91.5 (33.1)	91.9 (33.3)	87.3 (30.7)	77.3 (25.2)	65.7 (18.7)	57.1 (13.9)	74.8 (23.8)
Daily mean °F (°C)	44.4 (6.9)	48.3 (9.1)	56.1 (13.4)	64.0 (17.8)	72.3 (22.4)	79.0 (26.1)	81.5 (27.5)	81.1 (27.3)	75.6 (24.2)	64.9 (18.3)	53.8 (12.1)	47.1 (8.4)	64.0 (17.8)
Mean daily minimum °F (°C)	34.7 (1.5)	37.9 (3.3)	45.1 (7.3)	52.8 (11.6)	61.7 (16.5)	68.8 (20.4)	71.6 (22.0)	70.4 (21.3)	63.8 (17.7)	52.4 (11.3)	41.9 (5.5)	37.0 (2.8)	53.2 (11.8)
Mean minimum °F (°C)	16.6 (−8.6)	21.4 (−5.9)	27.0 (−2.8)	35.8 (2.1)	46.5 (8.1)	58.6 (14.8)	63.9 (17.7)	61.9 (16.6)	48.0 (8.9)	33.9 (1.1)	25.7 (−3.5)	21.5 (−5.8)	14.6 (−9.7)
Record low °F (°C)	−6 (−21)	−4 (−20)	13 (−11)	28 (−2)	35 (2)	49 (9)	53 (12)	52 (11)	35 (2)	27 (−3)	12 (−11)	2 (−17)	−6 (−21)
Average precipitation inches (mm)	4.52 (115)	5.04 (128)	4.76 (121)	5.82 (148)	4.44 (113)	3.74 (95)	3.82 (97)	3.21 (82)	3.83 (97)	3.41 (87)	3.86 (98)	5.33 (135)	51.78 (1,315)
Average precipitation days (≥ 0.01 in)	9.6	10.0	10.7	8.9	9.8	9.0	9.3	8.2	6.0	7.4	8.3	10.2	107.4
Source: NOAAIEM

== Demographics ==
Historical population
Census	Pop.	Note	%±
1880	308		—
1890	1,055		242.5%
1900	3,026		186.8%
1910	5,836		92.9%
1920	7,793		33.5%
1930	11,123		42.7%
1940	14,767		32.8%
1950	18,061		22.3%
1960	20,436		13.1%
1970	22,400		9.6%
1980	20,115		−10.2%
1990	18,906		−6.0%
2000	18,425		−2.5%
2010	15,205		−17.5%
2020	14,490		−4.7%
U.S. Decennial Census

=== 2020 census ===
As of the 2020 census, Greenwood had a population of 14,490. There were 2,793 families residing in the city. The median age was 37.3 years. 26.2% of residents were under the age of 18 and 16.3% were 65 years of age or older. For every 100 females there were 86.0 males, and for every 100 females age 18 and over there were 81.7 males age 18 and over.

98.2% of residents lived in urban areas, while 1.8% lived in rural areas.

There were 5,813 households in Greenwood, of which 33.3% had children under the age of 18 living in them. Of all households, 26.9% were married-couple households, 21.3% were households with a male householder and no spouse or partner present, and 45.7% were households with a female householder and no spouse or partner present. About 34.5% of all households were made up of individuals and 13.4% had someone living alone who was 65 years of age or older.

There were 6,609 housing units, of which 12.0% were vacant. The homeowner vacancy rate was 2.3% and the rental vacancy rate was 10.4%.

Racial composition as of the 2020 census
Race	Number	Percent
White	3,669	25.3%
Black or African American	10,244	70.7%
American Indian and Alaska Native	13	0.1%
Asian	161	1.1%
Native Hawaiian and Other Pacific Islander	0	0.0%
Some other race	103	0.7%
Two or more races	300	2.1%
Hispanic or Latino (of any race)	209	1.4%

=== 2010 census ===
At the 2010 census, there were 15,205 people and 6,022 households in the city. The population density was 1,237.7 inhabitants per square mile (477.9/km^{2}). There were 6,759 housing units. The racial makeup of the city was 30.4% White, 67.0% Black, 0.1% Native American, 0.9% Asian, <0.1% Pacific Islander, <0.1% from other races, and 0.5% from two or more races. Hispanic or Latino of any race were 1.1% of the population.

Among the 6,022 households, 28.7% had children under the age of 18 living with them, 29.8% were married couples living together, 29.0% had a female householder with no husband present, 4.6% had a male householder with no wife present, and 36.6% were non-families. 32.5% of all households were made up of individuals living alone and 10.7% had someone living alone who was 65 years of age or older. The average household size was 2.48 and the average family size was 3.16.

== Arts and culture ==
=== Mississippi Blues Trail markers ===
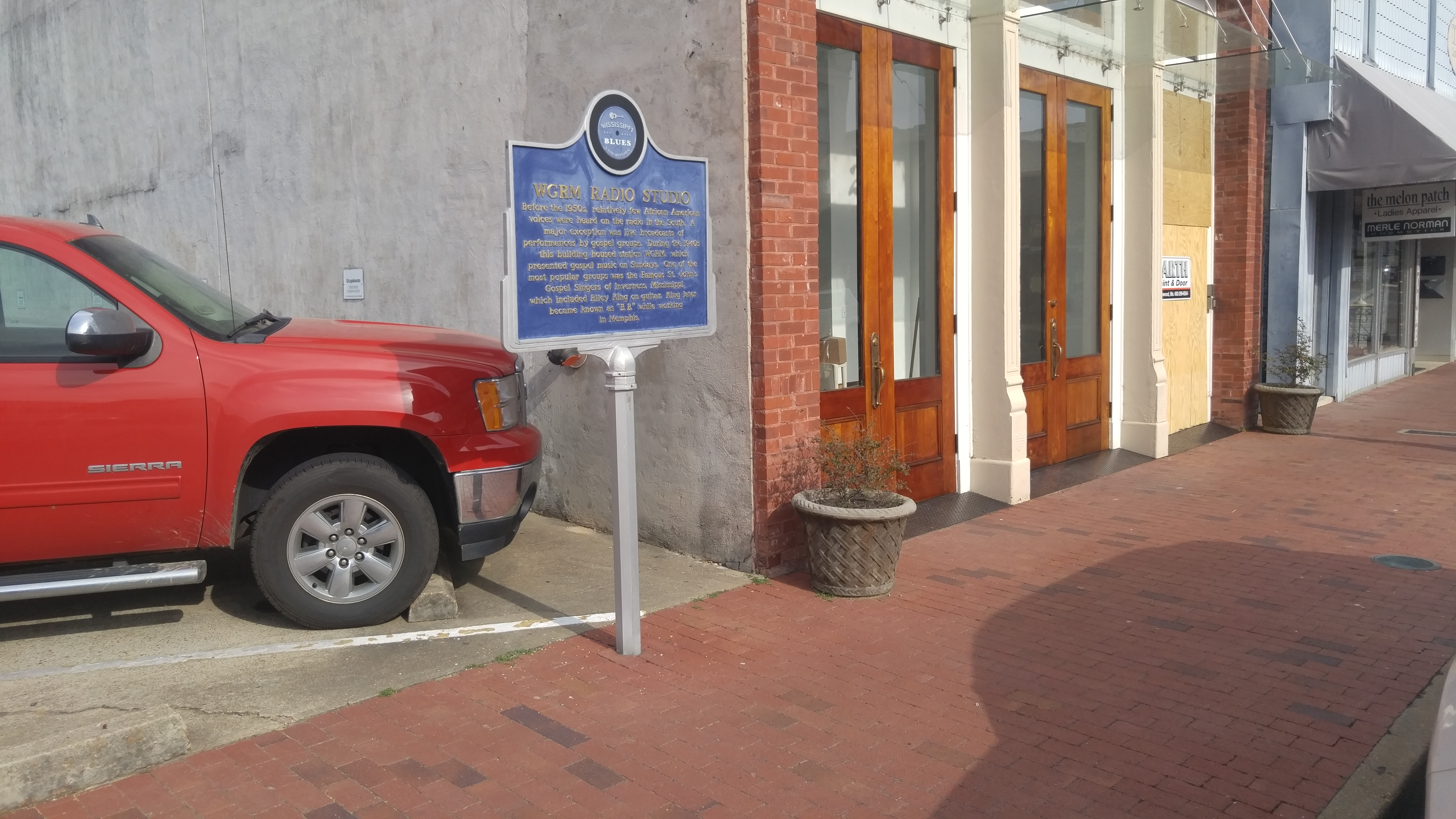
WGRM Radio Studio Blues Trail marker

Radio station WGRM on Howard Street was the location of B.B. King's first live broadcast in 1940. On Sunday nights, King performed live gospel music as part of a quartet. In memory of this event, the Mississippi Blues Trail has placed its third historic marker in this town at the site of the former radio station. Another Mississippi Blues Trail marker is placed near the grave of the blues singer Robert Johnson. A third Blues Trail marker notes the Elks Lodge in the city, which was an important black organization. A fourth Blues Trail marker was dedicated to Hubert Sumlin that is located along the Yazoo River on River Road.

== Parks and recreation ==
- Stribling Park features baseball and soccer fields.
- Whittington Park features tennis courts, baseball, and basketball facilities.
- Greenwood Tennis and Pickleball Centre features tennis and pickleball courts.
- Sonny Brown Swimming Pool is an outdoor pool.

== Government ==
Greenwood is governed under a city council form of government, composed of council members elected from seven single-member wards and headed by a mayor, who is elected at-large.

In 2025, Democrat Kenderick Cox defeated incumbent mayor Carolyn McAdams, who had been serving since 2009.

== Education ==
Greenwood Leflore Consolidated School District (GLCSD) operates public schools. Previously the majority of the city was in Greenwood Public School District while small portions were in the Leflore County School District. These two districts consolidated into GLCSD on July 1, 2019. Greenwood High School is the only public high school in Greenwood. As of 2014, the student body is 99% black. Amanda Elzy High School, outside of the Greenwood city limits, was formerly of the Leflore County district. It was recently taken over by the State of Mississippi for poor performance as a result of deficient leadership.

Pillow Academy, a private school, is located in unincorporated Leflore County, near Greenwood.

Delta Streets Academy, a newly founded private school located in downtown Greenwood, has an enrollment of nearly 50 students. It has continued to increase enrollment.

St. Francis Catholic School, run by the Roman Catholic Diocese of Jackson, provides classes from kindergarten through sixth grade.

In addition, North New Summit School provides educational services for special-needs and at-risk children from kindergarten through high school.

== Media ==
=== Newspapers, magazines and journals ===
- The Greenwood Commonwealth

=== Television ===
- WABG-TV – ABC/Fox affiliate
- WMEL-LD - MeTV affiliate
- WMAO-TV – PBS affiliate

=== AM/FM radio ===
- WABG, 960 AM (blues)
- WGNG, 106.3 FM (hip-hop/urban contemporary)
- WGNL, 104.3 FM (urban adult contemporary/blues)
- WGRM, 1240 AM (gospel)
- WGRM-FM, 93.9 FM (gospel)
- WMAO-FM, 90.9 FM (NPR broadcasting)
- WKXG, 92.7 FM (Country music) KIX-92.7
- WYMX, 99.1 FM (classic rock)

=== Filming location ===
Nightmare in Badham County (1976), Ode to Billy Joe (1976), and The Help (2011) were filmed in Greenwood. The 1991 movie Mississippi Masala was also set and filmed in Greenwood. The first season of Women of the Movement, about Mamie Till-Mobley was filmed in Greenwood.

== Infrastructure ==
=== Transportation ===
==== Railroads ====
Greenwood is served by two major rail lines: the Canadian National Railway and the Columbus and Greenville Railway, owned by the Genesee & Wyoming. Amtrak, the national passenger rail system, provides service to Greenwood, connecting New Orleans to Chicago from Greenwood station.

==== Air transportation ====
Greenwood is served by Greenwood–Leflore Airport (GWO) to the east, and is located midway between Jackson, Mississippi, and Memphis, Tennessee. It is about halfway between Dallas, Texas, and Atlanta, Georgia.

==== Highways ====
- U.S. Route 82 runs through Greenwood on its way from Georgia's Atlantic coast (Brunswick, Georgia) to the White Sands of New Mexico (east of Las Cruces).
- U.S. Route 49 passes through Greenwood as it stretches between Piggott, Arkansas, south to Gulfport.
- Other Greenwood highways include Mississippi Highway 7.

== Notable people ==
- Valerie Brisco-Hooks, Olympic athlete
- C. C. Brown, professional football player
- Nora Jean Bruso, blues singer and songwriter
- Louis Coleman, Major League Baseball pitcher
- Byron De La Beckwith, white supremacist, assassin of civil rights leader Medgar Evers
- Carlos Emmons, professional football player
- Betty Everett, R&B vocalist and pianist
- James L. Flanagan, electrical engineer and speech scientist
- Alphonso Ford, professional basketball player
- Webb Franklin, United States congressman
- Morgan Freeman, actor
- Jim Gallagher, Jr., professional golfer
- Bobbie Gentry, singer/songwriter
- Sherrod Gideon, professional football player
- Gerald Glass, professional basketball player
- Guitar Slim, blues musician
- Lusia Harris, basketball player
- Endesha Ida Mae Holland, American scholar, playwright, and civil rights activist
- Dave Hoskins, professional baseball player
- Kent Hull, professional football player
- Tom Hunley, ex-slave and the inspiration for the character "Hambone" in J. P. Alley's syndicated cartoon feature, Hambone's Meditations
- Sam Jacobs (bishop), Catholic Bishop
- Robert Johnson, blues musician
- Jermaine Jones, soccer player for the New England Revolution and United States national team
- Cleo Lemon, Toronto Argonauts quarterback
- Walter "Furry" Lewis, blues musician
- Bernie Machen, president of the University of Florida
- Della Campbell MacLeod (ca. 1884 – ?), author and journalist
- Paul Maholm, baseball pitcher
- Matt Miller, baseball pitcher
- Mulgrew Miller, jazz pianist
- Juanita Moore, actress
- Carrie Nye, actress
- W. Allen Pepper Jr., US federal judge
- Fenton Robinson, blues singer/guitarist
- Laverne Smith, NFL player
- Hubert Sumlin, blues guitarist
- Donna Tartt, novelist
- James K. Vardaman, Mississippi governor, senator, and white supremacist
- Charlie Wells, mystery writer, author of Let the Night Fall (1953) and The Last Kill (1955)
- Willye B. White, Olympic athlete
