= List of Delta blues musicians =

The Delta blues is one of the earliest styles of blues music. It originated in the Mississippi Delta, a region of the United States that stretches from north to south between Memphis, Tennessee, and Vicksburg, Mississippi, and from east to west between the Yazoo River and the Mississippi River. The Mississippi Delta is historically famous for its fertile soil and the poverty of farm workers living there. Guitar and harmonica are the dominant instruments in Delta blues. Vocal styles range from introspective and soulful to passionate and fiery.

== A ==
- Woodrow Adams (April 9, 1917 – August 9, 1988). Singer, guitarist and harmonica player who recorded three singles.
- Cecil Augusta (born 1920). Singer and guitarist who recorded one song for Alan Lomax in 1959.

== B ==
- Kid Bailey. Recorded one known session, in 1929.
- Tommy Bankhead (October 24, 1931, Lake Cormorant, Mississippi – December 16, 2000). Guitarist and singer who backed other musicians, including Howlin' Wolf and Sonny Boy Williamson I, and released a few albums under his own name.
- John Henry Barbee (November 14, 1905, Henning, Tennessee – November 3, 1964). Guitarist and singer, an exponent of early country blues and Delta blues, who early in his career performed with Sunnyland Slim.
- Roosevelt "Booba" Barnes (September 25, 1936 – April 2, 1996). Guitarist, harmonica player, and singer, he played the juke joints and clubs in and around Greenville, Mississippi. In 1981, he opened his own club called Playboy Club on Nelson Street.
- Houston Boines (December 30, 1918 – November 8, 1970). Singer and harmonica player, Boines accompanied by guitarist Charley Booker, was recruited by talent scout Ike Turner to record for Modern Records in 1952. He also recorded for Sun Records in 1953.
- Charley Booker (September 3, 1925, Sunflower County, Mississippi – September 20, 1989). Singer and guitarist, mostly active around Leland and Greenville, Mississippi, in the 1940s and early 1950s.
- Ishmon Bracey (January 9, 1889, Byram, Mississippi – February 12, 1970). Early country blues and Delta blues guitarist and vocalist.
- Willie Brown (August 6, 1900 – December 30, 1952). Guitarist, singer and songwriter.
- R. L. Burnside (November 23, 1926, Oxford, Mississippi – September 1, 2005). Acoustic and electric North Mississippi hill country blues, Delta blues, and juke joint blues guitarist and singer.

== C ==
- Sam Carr (April 17, 1926, Marvell, Arkansas – September 21, 2009). Drummer best known as a member of the Jelly Roll Kings.
- Bo Carter (March 21, 1893, Bolton, Mississippi – September 21, 1964). Country blues singer and multi-instrumentalist who performed mostly early Delta blues, playing guitar, banjo, string bass and clarinet, one of the first dirty blues musicians, with songs such as "Banana in Your Fruit Basket".
- James Cotton (July 1, 1935, Tunica, Mississippi – March 16, 2017). Harmonica blues player and singer who began as a Delta blues musician and later moved to Chicago and began playing Chicago blues in acoustic and electric settings.
- Arthur "Big Boy" Crudup (August 24, 1905, Forest, Mississippi – March 28, 1974). Guitarist and singer who began as a Delta blues musician and later moved to Chicago, where he played Delta blues and Chicago blues in acoustic and electric settings.

== D ==
- CeDell Davis (June 9, 1926 – September 27, 2017). Blues guitarist and singer, with a distinctive style of guitar playing due to his infirmity. Davis played guitar using a butter knife in his fretting hand.
- Walter Davis (March 1, 1911 or 1912 – October 22, 1963). Blues singer, pianist, and songwriter who was one of the most prolific blues recording artists from the early 1930s to the early 1950s.
- Mattie Delaney (born c. 1905 – fl. 1930). Singer and guitarist active in the 1930s. Only two recordings by her are known: "Down the Big Road Blues" and "Tallahatchie River Blues".
- Delta Blind Billy (Dates unknown) As a traveling bluesman in Mississippi, he performed with his contemporaries Arthur Crudup and Papa Charlie McCoy. He is known for recording songs about being an outlaw, despite being legally blind.

== E ==
- David "Honeyboy" Edwards (June 28, 1915, Shaw, Mississippi – August 29, 2011). Grammy Award–winning guitarist and singer; at the time of his death he may have been the last living Delta blues player of the twentieth century.
- Robert "Big Mojo" Elem (January 22, 1928 – February 5, 1997). An electric bass guitarist raised in the Delta, Elem relocated to Chicago in 1948. He was noted as a "born entertainer whose joking and acting on stage appealed to club audiences".

== F ==
- T-Model Ford (June 24, 1923 – July 16, 2013). His musical style combined the rawness of Delta blues with Chicago and juke joint blues styles.
- Frank Frost (April 15, 1936 or 1938 – October 12, 1999). Frost was one of the foremost Delta blues harmonica players of his generation.

== G ==
- Boyd Gilmore (June 1, 1905 – December 23, 1976). Delta blues singer, guitarist and songwriter. Among the songs he wrote were "All in My Dreams", "Believe I'll Settle Down", "I Love My Little Woman" and "If That's Your Girl". Gilmore also recorded a version of fellow Delta bluesman Robert Johnson's track, "Ramblin' on My Mind".

== H ==
- W. C. Handy (November 16, 1873 – March 28, 1958). A composer and musician who referred to himself as the 'Father of the Blues'. He was one of the most influential songwriters in the United States.
- Richard "Hacksaw" Harney (July 16, 1902, Money, Mississippi – December 25, 1973, Jackson, Mississippi). Guitarist and pianist.
- Jessie Mae Hemphill (October 18, 1923 – July 22, 2006). An electric guitarist, songwriter, and vocalist also specializing in the North Mississippi hill country blues traditions of her family and regional heritage.
- Sid Hemphill (1876 – 1963). A multi-instrumentalist and bandleader who played in his own string band mainly in Mississippi.
- King Solomon Hill (1897, McComb, Mississippi – 1949, Sibley, Louisiana). Singer and guitarist who recorded a handful of songs in 1932.
- Rosa Lee Hill (September 25, 1910 – October 22, 1968, Como, Mississippi). Guitarist and singer.
- Jimmy "Duck" Holmes (born July 28, 1947). Blues musician and proprietor of the Blue Front Cafe on the Mississippi Blues Trail, the oldest surviving juke joint in Mississippi.
- John Lee Hooker (August 22, 1912, Clarksdale, Mississippi – June 21, 2001). Acoustic and electric guitarist and singer, one of the best-known exponents of Delta blues, who also played Detroit blues.
- Son House (March 21, 1902, Lyon, Mississippi – October 19, 1988). Singer and guitarist.
- Howlin' Wolf (June 10, 1910 – January 10, 1976). Chicago blues singer, guitarist and harmonica player.
- Mississippi John Hurt (March 8, 1893 (Note: There is uncertainty about his date of birth. March 8, 1893, is the date written in his family's Bible and accepted by his biographer Philip Ratcliffe and by the researchers Bob Eagle and Eric LeBlanc as the most likely. Other possible dates include March 3, 1892 (shown on his gravestone); March 8, 1892; March 16, 1892; July 2, 1892; July 3, 1893; and May 5, 1895.) – November 2, 1966). Delta and country blues singer, songwriter, and guitarist.

== J ==
- Elmore James (January 27, 1918, Richland, Mississippi – May 24, 1963). Slide guitarist, playing acoustic and electric guitars, and singer, who performed Delta blues and Chicago blues and is best known for the latter; his technique influenced a generation of guitarists that followed.
- Skip James (June 9, 1902, Bentonia, Mississippi – October 3, 1969). Singer, guitarist, pianist and songwriter.
- Big Jack Johnson (July 30, 1939, Lambert, Mississippi – March 14, 2011). Electric blues musician, one of a very small number of blues musicians to play the mandolin.
- Louise Johnson. Singer and pianist.
- Robert Johnson (May 8, 1911, Hazlehurst, Mississippi – August 16, 1938). Singer-songwriter and guitarist, recognized since the 1960s as a master of Delta blues and an important influence on many rock musicians.
- Tommy Johnson (1896, near Terry, Mississippi – November 1, 1956). Guitarist, singer-songwriter.

== K ==
- B. B. King (September 16, 1925 – May 14, 2015). Blues guitarist, singer, songwriter, and record producer. From his Delta blues beginnings, King introduced a sophisticated style of soloing based on fluid string bending, shimmering vibrato, and staccato picking that influenced many later electric guitar blues players.
- Little Freddie King (born July 19, 1940, McComb, Mississippi). Guitarist. He appears in the 2015 documentary film I Am the Blues.

== L ==
- Robert Lockwood Jr. (March 27, 1915, Turkey Scratch, Arkansas – November 21, 2006). Guitarist who learned to play directly from Robert Johnson and is known for his longtime collaboration with Sonny Boy Williamson II and his work in the mid-1950s with Little Walter.
- Willie Lofton (January 1897 – 1956 or c. 1962). Singer and guitarist.
- Willie Love (November 4, 1906, Duncan, Mississippi – August 19, 1953). Pianist.

== M ==
- Tommy McClennan (January 4, 1905 – May 9, 1961). Singer and guitarist.
- Kansas Joe McCoy (May 11, 1905 – January 28, 1950). Singer, musician and songwriter.
- Papa Charlie McCoy (May 26, 1909 – July 26, 1950). Guitarist, mandolinist, and singer, one of the major blues accompanists of his time.
- Prince McCoy (March 19, 1882 – February 4, 1968). Violinist, latterly acknowledged as a pioneer and with a Mississippi Blues Trail marker located in Greenville.
- Hayes McMullan (January 29, 1902 – May 1986). Singer, guitarist and songwriter. He also was variously employed as a sharecropper, deacon and was a civil rights activist.
- Mississippi John Hurt (March 8, 1892 or 1893, Teoc, Mississippi – November 2, 1966, Grenada, Mississippi). Known for his syncopated fingerpicking style. Recorded by the Library of Congress late in his life.
- Mississippi Matilda (January 27, 1914 – November 15, 1978). Singer-songwriter who recorded four songs for Bluebird Records in 1936. Wife of Sonny Boy Nelson from 1935 to 1952.
- Muddy Waters (April 4, 1913, Rolling Fork, Mississippi – April 30, 1983). Slide guitarist and singer who began his career playing Delta blues but is best known as a Chicago blues musician, one of the more recognizable names in blues.

== N ==
- Sonny Boy Nelson (December 23, 1908 – November 4, 1998). Multi-instrumentalist, playing the banjo, guitar, harmonica, horn, mandolin and violin.

== O ==
- Jack Owens (November 17, 1904 – February 9, 1997). Singer and guitarist.

== P ==
- Bertha Lee Pate better known as Bertha Lee (June 17, 1902 Lula, Mississippi – May 10, 1975). Singer. Recorded with, and was the common-law wife of, Charley Patton.
- Charley Patton (between April 1887 and 1891 – April 28, 1934). Guitarist, slide guitarist and singer, considered by many to be the "father of the Delta blues" is credited with creating an enduring body of American music and personally inspiring just about every Delta bluesman.
- Pinetop Perkins (July 7, 1913, Belzoni, Mississippi – March 21, 2011). Pianist who played with some of the most influential blues and rock and roll performers in American history.
- Robert Petway (possibly October 18, 1907 – date of death unknown). Singer and guitarist who recorded only 16 songs, but was an influence on many notable blues and rock musicians.

== R ==
- Andy Rodgers (March 14, 1922 – August 14, 2004). Harmonicist, guitarist, singer-songwriter. A flamboyant character, known commonly as the "Midnight Cowboy", Rodgers worked part-time as a musician for most of his lifetime, finally recording two albums in the 1990s.
- Doctor Ross (October 21, 1925, Tunica, Mississippi – May 28, 1993). Harmonica player, guitarist and singer of country blues, Delta blues, Detroit blues and juke joint blues.

== S ==
- Johnny Shines (April 26, 1915 – April 20, 1992). Singer and guitarist.
- J.D. Short (February 26, 1902 – October 21, 1962). Singer, guitarist and harmonica player.
- Henry "Son" Sims (August 22, 1890 – December 23, 1958). Fiddler and songwriter, best known as an accompanist for Charley Patton and the young Muddy Waters.
- Sunnyland Slim (September 5, 1906 – March 17, 1995). Blues pianist born in the Mississippi Delta and moved to Chicago, helping to make that city a center of postwar blues.
- Henry Sloan (January 1870 – possibly March 13, 1948). One of the earliest figures in the history of Delta blues. Very little is known for certain about his life, other than that he tutored Charlie Patton in the ways of the blues
- Freddie Spruell (December 28, 1893 – June 19, 1956). Singer and guitarist, generally regarded as the first Delta bluesman to be recorded.
- Houston Stackhouse (September 28, 1910 – September 23, 1980). Guitarist and singer best known for his association with Robert Nighthawk.

== T ==
- Johnny Temple (October 18, 1906 – November 22, 1968). Guitarist and singer.
- James Thomas (October 14, 1926 – June 26, 1993) Blues guitarist and singer, Thomas was variously a gravedigger and clay sculptor. Thomas's clay skulls are on display in the Delta Blues Museum, in Clarksdale, Mississippi, and the Highway 61 Blues Museum, in Leland, Mississippi.
- Shardé Thomas (born January 1990). A fife player in the vanishing American fife and drum blues tradition.

== U ==
- L. C. Ulmer (August 28, 1928 – February 14, 2016). Singer-songwriter and one-man band, playing up to 12 musical instruments at one time.

== V ==
- Mose Vinson (June 2 or August 7, 1917 – November 16, 2002). A boogie-woogie, blues and jazz pianist and singer, Vinson recorded at Sun Studios with James Cotton on "Cotton Crop Blues" (1954).

== W ==
- Bukka White (November 12, 1906 – February 26, 1977). Guitarist and singer.
- Geeshie Wiley (dates of birth and death unknown). Singer and guitarist who recorded six songs in 1930 and 1931.
- Big Joe Williams (October 16, 1903 – December 17, 1982). Guitarist, singer-songwriter, notable for the distinctive sound of his nine-string guitar.
- Sonny Boy Williamson II (December 5, 1912 – May 24, 1965). Early and influential harmonica stylist who recorded in the 1950s and 1960s.
- Johnny Woods (November 1, 1917 – February 1, 1990). A blues singer and harmonica player in the north Mississippi hill country blues style.

== Z ==
- Ike Zimmerman (April 27, 1907 – August 3, 1967). A Delta-based musician, who is now known to have been Robert Johnson's main guitar teacher.
