= Richard "Hacksaw" Harney =

American blues musician (1902–1973)

- Born: Richard Harney; July 16, 1902; Money, Mississippi, US
- Died: December 25, 1973 (aged 71) Jackson, Mississippi, US
- Genres: Delta blues
- Occupations: Guitarist, pianist
- Instruments: Guitar, piano
- Years active: 1920s–1973
- Labels: Columbia, Adelphi
- Formerly of: Walter Rhodes, Pearl Dickson, Houston Stackhouse

Richard "Hacksaw" Harney (July 16, 1902 – December 25, 1973) was an American Delta blues guitarist and pianist. He first entered a recording studio with his brother Maylon in 1928, to wax guitar work backing for separate tracks by Pearl Dickson and Walter Rhodes. However, Harney recorded rarely, until his belated solo album, Sweet Man (1972).

According to Robert Palmer, Harney was "... an exceptional technician whose busy, dense finger-picking style was far removed from the more heavily rhythmic playing of the Patton-House school and who was regarded by many musicians as the best guitarist in the Delta."

The loss of his murdered brother, a speech impediment and naturally shy disposition, were all factors in preventing Harney from achieving fame. He spent most of his working lifetime as an itinerant piano tuner and repairer.

== Life and career ==
Harney, who was of African American heritage, was born in Money, Mississippi, United States. (Note: It is the same location where Emmett Till was lynched, at the age of 14, in August 1955. "Illustrated Richard "Hacksaw" Harney Discography". Wirz.de.) His parents were Mary Howard and Dick Harney; his church deacon father having foregone secular music in enrolling in church duties. Dick encouraged his offspring to play secular music, as long as they did not practice in the family home. This led Richard by the age of 12 to playing on street corners in Greenville, Mississippi, in the company of Joe, his eldest brother. After initially sharecropping and street performing, Richard Harney worked as a bassist in a Cincinnati jazz band in the early 1920s. He had been raised in Greenwood, and then Marvell, Arkansas. Harney later lived in both Clarksdale, Mississippi, and Memphis, Tennessee.

While living within the Delta, Harney formed a guitar playing duo with another of his brothers, Maylon. They became known by their family nicknames of Can and Pet. Richard's nickname, Can, was an abbreviation of candy of which, as a child, he was partial. In December 1927, they recorded for Columbia Records, backing vocalist and button accordion player Walter Rhodes, as well as the obscure blues singer, Pearl Dickson. The label billed the former ensemble as Walter Rhodes with "Pet and "Can". Regarding the latter, some speculation exists that she was related in some way to another obscure figure, Tom Dickson. The Harney's recorded four tracks backing each performer, although only two sides each were released by the label early the following year. However, Pet and Can's musical career came to an abrupt halt shortly afterwards, when Maylon was stabbed to death in a juke joint. Following his brother's murder, Harney claimed he attempted to learn to play both parts, which when coupled with his experience in the jazz world, gave his guitar work an intricacy that drew admirers. Unusually for a Delta based musician, Harney played in a Piedmont fingerstyle blues manner, which he blended with ragtime influences, in a similar way to Blind Blake.

He predominately played on street corners and in juke joints, but also had a spell on the King Biscuit Time radio show, which was based in Helena, Arkansas. Primarily though his income came from his daytime work as a piano tuner and repairman, based in and around Memphis, Tennessee. This is how, according to Pinetop Perkins, Harney acquired his nickname of "Hacksaw". Wherever he travelled, Harney always carried a small suitcase filled with the tools of his trade, which included a hacksaw. Perkins also noted that Harney had the ability to fashion replacement piano parts on the job, using virtually any materials. Harney's business card stated that he repaired sewing machines, as well as piano tuning and rebuilding.

Through his travels and music, Harney apparently met and admired both Blind Lemon Jefferson and Charley Patton. He also played with Robert Lockwood Jr., Robert Johnson and Big Joe Williams. Lockwood claimed that Harney was well acquainted with Robert Johnson and was a major influence on him. Lockwood also felt that Harney was the only musician that could compete with Johnson. Sonny Boy Nelson was another who was inspired by meeting and playing with Harney. In David "Honeyboy" Edwards' autobiography, The World Don't Owe Me Nothing, Edwards mentioned that he played with both Harney and Tommy McClennan, and that McClennan got the song "Crosscut Saw" from Harney. Big Joe Williams noted when asked about other blues performers, "You ain't heard nothing yet. Wait 'til you meet Hacksaw".

Harney was also a gifted pianist, but in the company of strangers his shy demeanour and speech impediment sometimes attracted ridicule. In consequence, and without much recorded evidence, Harney spent most of his life in relative musical obscurity.

In 1969, Backwards Sam Firk finally tracked him down in Memphis, Tennessee. Harney no longer owned a guitar and had not played for 20 years. Despite his shyness he stated, "I was good 20 years back. My match was hard to find on guitar from then on back." He was filmed and made a couple of demo field recordings for Adelphi Records and, by 1971, Harney began playing again at workshops and music festivals. In February 1972, Harney recorded ten tracks at the Adelphi Studios in Silver Spring, Maryland. They were released on the album, Sweet Man, on both the Adelphi and Genes Records labels. Most of the numbers were up-tempo instrumentals, in a swinging style intended for dancing. It was noted that on several of the tracks Harney achieved a distinctive mandolin effect, using tremoloed single note runs or chords. Apart from one traditional number, "Five Foot Two" and "Oh, Red!" (Kansas Joe McCoy), all other eight tracks on Sweet Man were composed by Harney.

It is probable, although the label's notes do not specify as such, that Harney played second guitar on Houston Stackhouse's album, Cryin' Won't Help You. It was recorded in February 1972 at the Adelphi Studios in Silver Spring, Maryland; the same location, and in the same month, as Harney's Sweet Man.

Harney suffered a minor stroke, but he managed to tour with Stackhouse in 1972 and 1973.

== Critical assessment ==
In an interview he gave on October 6, 2000, Robert Lockwood Jr. stated "Hacksaw was an octopus! Well, that's the only way to explain how he could play so many notes at once. Of course, Robert [Johnson] stole his licks from a lot of guys, but I know for a fact that he learned from Hacksaw. And you know Hacksaw was just as good on the piano, don't you?"

In 1969, when speaking in Chicago, Big Joe Williams would finish a sentence with the words, "Yeah, _____'s good [fill in the blank with artist's name], but Hacksaw could cut him in a minute!"

In an interview printed in Living Blues, Lockwood claimed "I really think that Hacksaw was a big influence with Robert [Johnson]. He was the only somebody who could compete with him... He played the guitar very, very well.

In the liner notes to Harney's album it commented, "If this was rusty playing, we can only imagine what men like Big Joe Williams, Robert Lockwood and Robert Johnson heard in the 1930s. By that time, Hacksaw had mastered a very sophisticated sound, due in part to his experience with a jazz orchestra during the early 20s and reinforced by his ongoing exposure to a variety of musicians in his travels as a piano tuner and rebuilder".

== Death ==
One year after his final recording, Harney died at the age of 71 on Christmas Day 1973, in Jackson, Mississippi, from stomach cancer.

== Burial and placing of headstone ==
In late 1973, Harney was buried in an unmarked grave at the Hinds County Cemetery near Raymond, Mississippi. A blues historian, Marcia Weaver, located the graveyard in 2003, albeit finding that Harney's name was misspelled on the records. He was buried at Lot No. 71. Through a charitable donation, a grave marker was designed by Steve Salter of the non-profit organization, Killer Blues. It was placed on April 28, 2012. Rose Mary Harney, his daughter attended the ceremony, although Harney's son, Richard Harney, Jr., had died in an automobile accident in 1986.

== Discography ==
=== Singles ===
Year	Title (A-side / B-side)	Main artist	Record label				
Year	Title (A-side / B-side)	Main artist	Record label	1928	"Twelve Pound Daddy" / "Little Rock Blues"	Pearl Dickson	Columbia (Columbia 14286-D)
1928	"High Yellow Blues" / "Guitar Rag"	Pearl Dickson	Columbia unissued				
1928	"The Crowing Rooster" / "Leaving Home Blues"	Walter Rhodes	Columbia (Columbia 14289-D)				
1928	"She's A Girl of Mine" / "Left My Baby Blues"	Walter Rhodes	Columbia unissued				

=== Albums ===
Year	Title	Label	Re-issue (CD)
1972	Sweet Man	Adelphi Records	1996

=== Selected compilation album appearances ===
Year	Title	Album
1971	"Sunnyland Train Blues" : Sam Clark with guitar backing from Richard "Hacksaw" Harney and Backwards Sam Firk	The Memphis Blues Again Vol. 1
1971	"Hacksaw's Down South Blues" "Can Can" : both Richard "Hacksaw" Harney	The Memphis Blues Again Vol. 2
2001	"The Crowing Rooster"	Screamin' and Hollerin' the Blues: The Worlds of Charley Patton

== See also ==
- List of Delta blues musicians
