= Screamin' and Hollerin' the Blues: The Worlds of Charley Patton =

Box set by Charley Patton
- Released: October 23, 2001
- Recorded: 1924–1969
- Genre: Blues
- Label: Revenant

Screamin' and Hollerin' the Blues: The Worlds of Charley Patton is a boxed set collecting remastered versions of the recorded works of blues singer Charley Patton, with recordings by many of his associates, supplementary interviews and historical data. The set won three Grammy Awards, for Best Historical Album, Best Boxed or Special Limited Edition Package, and Best Album Notes.

== Background ==
Revenant Records was formed in 1996 by John Fahey and Dean Blackwood. The project to compile a boxed set of Charley Patton's music took approximately two years to complete, financed in a large part by an inheritance Fahey had received. "There's a lot of playful stuff in [Screamin' and Hollerin' the Blues], the depth of scholarship is there," said Blackwood. "But we dispense with the pretense."

The package includes seven CDs and is designed to resemble a 78 rpm record release. Only 52 Patton recordings survive to this day and five of the CDs contain these recordings plus songs he performed on as guitarist and other artists he brought to his record label. The seventh disc includes interviews with some of Patton's contemporaries. Also included is a reprint of Fahey’s 1970 master's thesis on Patton as well as notes by blues scholars David Evans, Dick Spottswood, and Ed Komara. Lyrics and reproductions of original 1929 Paramount ads are also included. The printed material covers Patton's life, music, and his world in the Yazoo River Basin within which he lived and performed.

== Reception ==
Professional ratings
Review scores
Source	Rating
Allmusic	5/5 stars
Entertainment Weekly	(A)
The Penguin Guide to Blues Recordings	+ crown
The Guardian	5/5 stars

In his review of the box set, music critic Richie Unterberger called it "Perhaps the most sumptuous, nay incredible, box set package ever devised for a blues artist." He also cautions that some of the tracks "sometimes suffer from unavoidably poor sound quality due to the extremely rough shape of the only surviving original copies."

Scott Schinder of Entertainment Weekly wrote that Revenant "has topped itself with this lavish seven-CD box honoring the gravelly howl, inventive guitar work, and vivid songwriting of seminal Delta bluesman Patton", and he praised the accompanying essay by John Fahey as "illuminating" and "fascinating". In The Guardian, Richard Williams suggested that the "unwieldy but magnificent collection will probably remain for ever unmatched" in its focus on a single musician.

== Track listing ==
Disc 1

By Charley Patton:

1. "Pony Blues"
2. "A Spoonful Blues"
3. "Down the Dirt Road Blues"
4. "Prayer of Death Part 1"
5. "Prayer of Death Part 2"
6. "Screamin' and Hollerin' the Blues"
7. "Banty Rooster Blues"
8. "Tom Rushen Blues"
9. "It Won't Be Long"
10. "Shake It and Break It (But Don't Let It Fall Mama)"
11. "Pea Vine Blues"
12. "Mississippi Boweavil Blues"
13. "Lord I'm Discouraged"
14. "I'm Goin' Home"

By Buddy Boy Hawkins:

15. "Snatch It and Grab It"
16. "A Rag Blues"
17. "How Come Mama Blues"
18. "Voice Throwin' Blues"

Disc 2

By Charley Patton:

1. "I Shall Not Be Moved" (take 1, previously unissued)
2. "Hammer Blues" (take 1, previously unissued)
3. "High Water Everywhere – Part I"
4. "High Water Everywhere – Part II"
5. "I Shall Not Be Moved"
6. "Rattlesnake Blues"
7. "Going to Move to Alabama"
8. "Hammer Blues" (take 2)
9. "Joe Kirby"
10. "Frankie and Albert"
11. "Devil Sent the Rain Blues"
12. "Magnolia Blues"
13. "Running Wild Blues"
14. "Some Happy Day"
15. "Mean Black Moan"
16. "Green River Blues"

By Edith North Johnson:

17. "That's My Man"
18. "Honey Dripper Blues No. 2"
19. "Eight Hour Woman"
20. "Nickel's Worth of Liver Blues No. 2"

Disc 3

By Charley Patton:

1. "Elder Greene Blues" (take 2, previously unissued)
2. "Some These Days I'll Be Gone" (take 1, previously unissued)
3. "Jim Lee – Part I"
4. "Jim Lee – Part II"
5. "Mean Black Cat Blues"
6. "Jesus Is a Dying-Bed Maker"
7. "Elder Greene Blues" (take 1)
8. "When Your Way Gets Dark"
9. "Some These Days I'll Be Gone" (take 2)
10. "Heart Like Railroad Steel"
11. "Circle Round the Moon"
12. "You're Gonna Need Somebody When You Die"
13. "Be True Be True Blues"

By Henry "Son" Sims:

14. "Farrell Blues"
15. "Tell Me Man Blues"
16. "Come Back Corrina"

Disc 4

By Charley Patton:

1. "Some Summer Day"
2. "Bird Nest Bound"

By Willie Brown:

3. "Future Blues"
4. "M&O Blues"

By Son House:

5. "Walkin' Blues" (previously unissued)
6. "My Black Mama – Part I"
7. "My Black Mama – Part II"
8. "Preachin' the Blues – Part I"
9. "Preachin' the Blues – Part II"
10. "Dry Spell Blues Part I"
11. "Dry Spell Blues Part II"

By Louise Johnson:

12. "All Night Long Blues" (take 1)
13. "On the Wall"
14. "All Night Long Blues" (take 2, previously unissued)
15. "By the Moon and Stars"
16. "Long Ways from Home"

Disc 5

By Charley Patton:

1. "Dry Well Blues"
2. "Moon Going Down"

By Delta Big Four:

3. "We All Gonna Face the Rising Sun"
4. "Moaner Let's Go Down in the Valley"
5. "Jesus Got His Arms Around Me"
6. "God Won't Forsake His Own"
7. "I'll Be Here"
8. "Where Was Eve Sleeping?"
9. "I Know My Time Ain't Long"
10. "Watch and Pray"

By H. C. Speir:

11. "Paramount test 1-4/19/30 headlines"
12. "Paramount test 2-4/12/30 headlines"

By Charley Patton:

13. "High Sheriff Blues"
14. "Stone Pony Blues"
15. "Jersey Bull Blues"
16. "Hang It on the Wall"
17. "34 Blues"
18. "Love My Stuff"
19. "Poor Me"
20. "Revenue Man Blues"

Performer as noted:

21. "Troubled 'Bout My Mother" (Charley Patton and Bertha Lee)
22. "Oh Death" (Charley Patton and Bertha Lee)
23. "Yellow Bee" (Bertha Lee)
24. "Mind Reader Blues" (Bertha Lee)

Disc 6

Performer as noted:

1. "Booze and Blues" (1924) (Ma Rainey)
2. "The Crowing Rooster" (1927) (Walter Rhodes)
3. "I Will Turn Your Money Green" (1928) (Furry Lewis)
4. "Ham Hound Crave" (1928) (Rube Lacy)
5. "Bye Bye Blues" (1928) (Tommy Johnson)
6. "Maggie Campbell" (1928) (Tommy Johnson)
7. "Big Road Blues" (1928) (Tommy Johnson)
8. "Kansas City Blues" (1928) (William Harris)
9. "Rowdy Blues" (1929) (Kid Bailey)
10. "Mississippi Bottom Blues" (1929) (Kid Bailey)
11. "Cold Woman Blues" (1929) (Blind Joe Reynolds)
12. "Sitting on Top of the World" (1930) (Mississippi Sheiks)
13. "Just a Spoonful" (1930) (Charley Jordan)
14. "Banty Rooster" (1934) (Blind Pete and George Ryan)
15. "My Grey Pony" (1935) (Big Joe Williams)
16. "Dark Road Blues" (1935) (Willie Lofton Trio)
17. "Blues" (1936)" (unknown convict)
18. "Sic 'Em Dogs On" (1939) (Bukka White)
19. "Po' Boy" (1939)" (Bukka White)
20. "Make Me a Pallet on the Floor" (1941) (Willie Brown)
21. "County Farm Blues" (1942) (Son House)
22. "Saddle My Pony" (1952) (The Howlin' Wolf)
23. "Forty Four" (1954) (The Howlin' Wolf)
24. "Too Close" (1957) (Roebuck "Pops" Staples and the Staple Singers)

== Personnel ==
- Dean Blackwood – compilation producer
- Scott Colburn – audio production, tape transfer
- John Davis – transfer
- Potsy Duncan – illustrations, digital manipulation
- David Glasser – mastering, audio restoration
- Christopher C. King – coordination, transfers, sound director
- Alan Lomax – engineer
- John Work – engineer
- Charlie Pilzer – audio restoration
- Matt Sandoski – mastering engineer
- Steven Smolian – transfers
- David Evans – liner notes
- John Fahey – book
- Richard K. Spottswood – liner notes
- Chris Strachwitz – interviewer
- Ernest C. Withers – photography
- Henry H Owings – design, layout design
- Susan Archie – art direction
