= Dockery =

Dockery may refer to:

== Places ==
- Dockery, Mississippi, a community in the United States
- Dockery, Missouri, a community in the United States
- Dockery Plantation, Mississippi, birthplace of Delta blues music

== People with the surname ==
- Alexander Monroe Dockery (1845–1926), American politician from Missouri
- Alfred Dockery (1797–1875), American politician from North Carolina
- C.C. (Doc) Dockery (1933–2022), American businessman and political advisor
- Chris Dockery, American politician from Georgia
- Derrick Dockery (born 1980), American football player
- Gerald Dockery (born 1970), American football player
- John Dockery (born 1944), American sportscaster and American football player
- Kevin Dockery (born 1984), American football player
- Michelle Dockery (born 1981), British actress
- Nerys Dockery, Kittian civil servant, politician and political ambassador
- Oliver H. Dockery (1830–1906), American politician from North Carolina
- Paula Dockery (born 1961), American politician from Florida
- Sam Dockery (1929–2015), American pianist
- Sean Dockery (born 1983), American basketball player
- Thomas Pleasant Dockery (1833–1898), American military officer
- Will Dockery (1865–1936), American plantation owner

== See also ==
- Dockery and Son, a poem in The Whitsun Weddings by Philip Larkin
