= Mount Zion Memorial Fund =

American non-profit corporation

The Mount Zion Memorial Fund is a non-profit corporation formed in 1989 and named after the Mount Zion Missionary Baptist Church in Morgan City, Mississippi, United States. The fund was organized by Raymond 'Skip' Henderson, a former social worker turned vintage guitar dealer and event promoter (New York Guitar Show), in order to create a legal conduit to get financial support to rural African-American church communities in Mississippi, and to memorialize the contributions of numerous musicians interred in rural cemeteries without grave markers. For work with the Mount Zion Memorial Fund, Henderson received the W.C. Handy Award for historic preservation "Keeping the Blues Alive" in May 1995.

Over a 12-year period from 1990 to 2001, the Mount Zion Memorial Fund erected twelve memorials to blues musicians across the state of Mississippi. Founded in Clarksdale, Mississippi, from November 1997 until August 2013 the Mount Zion Memorial Fund worked from New Orleans, Louisiana. In September 2013 the organization moved operation to Oxford, Mississippi where it continues operation under the direction of executive director Tyler DeWayne Moore of the University of Mississippi with Skip Henderson and Euphus Ruth Jr. of Greenville, Mississippi serving as co-chairmen of the board of directors.

The renewed efforts of the Mount Zion Memorial Fund since 2010 have been spearheaded by Tyler DeWayne Moore, a historian and scholar based out of Oxford, Mississippi. The relatives of Tommy Johnson and other interments in Warm Springs CME Church Cemetery, obtained a permanent fifteen foot wide and half-a-mile long easement to the important site, due in large part to efforts and compelling arguments of Moore, who took over as executive director in January 2014. Moore subsequently directed the restoration of the U.S. military markers of Henry "Son" Sims and Jackie Brenston. In the period between 2014 and 2017, the Mount Zion Memorial Fund dedicated five additional memorials, including the headstone of Frank Stokes in the abandoned Hollywood Cemetery, Memphis, Tennessee; the flat companion stone of Ernest Lawlars in Walls, Mississippi; and in Greenville, Mississippi, the flat markers of T-Model Ford and Eddie Cusic, and the unique headstone of Mamie Davis (also known as Mamie Galore). In addition, the Mount Zion Memorial Fund monitors legal actions involving cemeteries and provides technical assistance to cemetery corporations and community preservationists in Oklahoma, Tennessee, Mississippi, and South Carolina, such as the Friends of Hollywood/Mt. Carmel Cemeteries. The latter assists in restoring these two massive and abandoned African American cemeteries in Memphis, "back to a beautiful place of rest for all" interments, including Frank Stokes and Furry Lewis.

== Markers ==
=== Robert Johnson ===
The organization was officially incorporated as The Robert Johnson Mount Zion Memorial Fund in late 1989, to raise money to save the 114-year-old Mount Zion Church (founded 1909) from foreclosure and to place a cenotaph historic marker (not a headstone as is often mistaken – the monument bears no birth/death dates) in the Mount Zion Missionary Baptist Church cemetery, in honor of Robert Johnson, whose death certificate lists "Zion Church" as a burial site.

The decision to place the memorial where it is at Mount Zion was made to keep the rest of the cemetery from being trampled by visitors, and to have the song titles, some of which mention the devil, facing away from the church itself in deference to the church congregation. The unveiling took place on April 20, 1991, in partnership with Columbia Records through the work of Columbia A&R man Arthur Levy, with the support of Columbia President Don Ienner, and with the cooperation of the Mount Zion congregation under the guidance of Pastor Rev. James Ratliff. The ceremony was attended by over 300 people and was covered by Billboard, Rolling Stone, Newsweek, Guitar Player, and numerous local media. The granite obelisk has a central inscription by Peter Guralnick, side inscriptions by Skip Henderson, which were later used with permission on the Robert Johnson marker in Hazelhurst, Mississippi, and all of Johnson's known recordings added at the behest of Columbia Records. This marker has been vandalized on at least three occasions, apparently by souvenir seekers.

=== Charley Patton ===
Shortly after the Robert Johnson memorial was placed, John Fogerty, after meeting Henderson in the Mount Zion cemetery, agreed to fund a headstone to be placed on the grave of Charley Patton at the New Jerusalem M.B. Church in Holly Ridge, Mississippi. The Patton ceremony took place on July 20, 1991, the same weekend as the Pops Staples Festival in nearby Drew, Mississippi and subsequently Roebuck "Pops" Staples was in attendance joining Fogerty, and three generations of Patton's family, including daughter Rosetta Patton Brown, granddaughter Martha Brown and great-granddaughter Keisha Brown at the ceremony.

=== Elmore James ===
In early September 1991 after reading an article about the Mount Zion ceremony in the May 11, 1991 issue of Billboard, Phil Walden of Capricorn Records contacted Henderson and commissioned a bronze sculpture mounted on a granite headstone through the Mount Zion Fund in honor of Elmore James. This memorial was placed on James' grave in the Newport Baptist Church Cemetery in Ebenezer, Holmes County, Mississippi on December 10, 1992, with several members of the Mississippi State Legislature in attendance along with Dick Waterman, Phil Walden, musician Marshall Crenshaw, James' one time producer Bobby Robinson, members of James' family, and many others. Henderson was presented with a cultural award from the State of Mississippi at that event.

=== Mississippi Fred McDowell ===
Several months afterwards with the help of Jackson, Mississippi attorney Robert Arentson, on August 6, 1993, a memorial was placed on the grave site of Mississippi Fred McDowell at the Hammond Hill Baptist Church cemetery in Como, Mississippi. The ceremony was presided over by Dick Waterman and the memorial with McDowell's portrait upon it was paid for by Bonnie Raitt. In this case the memorial stone was a replacement for an inaccurate (McDowell's name misspelled) and damaged marker – the original stone was subsequently donated by McDowell's family to the Delta Blues Museum in Clarksdale, Mississippi.

=== Big Joe Williams ===
The following year a large gravestone for Big Joe Williams, who lies buried in a rural pasture near Crawford, Mississippi, was purchased through a collective effort of musicians led by California music journalist Dan Forte, while gathered at Clifford Antone's nightclub in Austin, Texas. The memorial was unveiled on October 9, 1994; the inscription by Dan Forte: "King of the Nine String Guitar", and a eulogy by musician and former Williams' sideman, Charlie Musselwhite.

=== Mississippi Joe Callicott ===
Following these memorials on April 29, 1995, a headstone was erected in the Mount Olive Baptist Church Cemetery in Nesbit, Mississippi to honor Mississippi Joe Callicott an original Memphis minstrel who began his performing career at the turn of the century. This marker was financed through the Mount Zion Fund with the help of musician Kenny Brown and by Chris Strachwitz, Arhoolie Records and John Fogerty. Callicott's original marker was a paving stone which read simply "Joe" and this was also subsequently donated to the Delta Blues Museum.

=== Memphis Minnie and James Thomas ===
Memorial headstones were added for James Thomas on March 9, 1996, at St. Matthew's Church in Leland, Mississippi; and Memphis Minnie (Minnie Douglas Lawlers) at the New Hope Baptist Church Cemetery in Walls, Mississippi, on October 13, 1996. Both memorials were paid for by John Fogerty and Bonnie Raitt. The ceremony for Memphis Minnie was recorded by the BBC and attended by 35 members of the extended Douglas family, many of whom had no idea of their relative's musical legacy. The headstone inscription was written by Minnie biographer Paul Garon: "The hundreds of sides Minnie recorded are the perfect material to teach us about the blues. For the blues are at once general, and particular, speaking for millions, but in a highly singular, individual voice. Listening to Minnie's songs we hear her fantasies, her dreams, her desires, but we will hear them as if they were our own."

=== Sam Chatmon and Sonny Boy Nelson ===
With the help of Greenville, Mississippi wet plate photographer Euphus "Butch" Ruth, the Mount Zion Memorial Fund dedicated a memorial headstone for Sam Chatmon in Sanders Memorial Cemetery, Hollandale, Mississippi on March 14, 1998. Chatmon's headstone reads: "Sitting On Top of the World" and includes an inscription by a Chatmon friend and former student, Libby Rae Watson. Shortly after the Chatmon ceremony, again with the help of Euphus Ruth, a memorial headstone for Sonny Boy Nelson, was placed on November 4, 1998, at the Evergreen Cemetery in Metcalfe, Mississippi. Both memorials were funded once again by grants from Raitt and Fogerty.

=== Lonnie Pitchford ===
On October 8, 2000, a memorial paid for by Fogerty and Rooster Blues Records, was placed on the grave of Lonnie Pitchford, near to Elmore James' resting place at the Newport Baptist Church cemetery in Ebenezer, Mississippi. This headstone was designed to have a playable, one-string diddley bow mounted on the side as per the family's wishes.

=== Tommy Johnson ===
In April 2001, a headstone for Tommy Johnson was commissioned by members of his family and paid for by a grant from Bonnie Raitt. On October 20, 2001, the unveiling ceremony was conducted in the town square of Crystal Springs, Mississippi by the Mayor of Crystal Springs with over twenty members of Johnson's extended family in attendance as well as Johnson's biographer Dr. David Evans, John Sinclair and a contingent of people from radio station WWOZ in New Orleans, many local musicians, blues fans, and local media. The large granite memorial, engraved with Johnson's portrait, was not placed on his grave for several years afterward, however, because of a dispute between Johnson's family (led by his niece, Vera Johnson Collins), the owners of farm property encircling the cemetery, and the Copiah County Board of Supervisors, over a deteriorated road to the burial site. The dispute was resolved in October 2012, when it was announced that the headstone would be erected on October 26. The headstone had been on public display in the Crystal Springs Public Library, since being unveiled on October 20, 2001. On the night of February 2, 2013, the headstone fell and was damaged. It is a matter of dispute whether it fell because it was inadequately secured, or was pushed over or deliberately smashed.

=== Charlie Burse ===
Following work by the Mount Zion Memorial Fund, on May 8, 2019, a new headstone for Charlie Burse was unveiled during a ceremony at his graveside, in Rose Hill Cemetery in Memphis, Tennessee.

=== T-Model Ford ===
The Mount Zion Memorial Fund, organised the placing of a headstone for T-Model Ford at Green Lawn Memorial Gardens Cemetery, near Greenville, Mississippi. The ceremony was held on May 31, 2014. The grave marker was designed by Amos Harvey and engraved by Alan Orlicek.
