= Walter Rhodes (musician) =

American blues musician

- Also known as: Walter "Pat" Rhodes
- Born: Cleveland, Mississippi, U.S.
- Genres: Blues
- Occupations: Musician; songwriter
- Instruments: Accordion; vocals
- Years active: 1920s
- Label: Columbia Records

Walter Rhodes was an American blues musician, who recorded briefly in the late 1920s and was unusual in being a blues accordionist and singer from Mississippi. It was reported that Rhodes may have been the oldest Delta musician recorded. Little is known of his life outside of his recordings.

== Biography ==
Walter Rhodes was reportedly born in Cleveland, Mississippi, United States. He usually played in an ensemble containing himself plus one, or two, guitarists and a fiddler. On his recordings however, Rhodes was accompanied by a guitar duo. He recorded four sides for Columbia in 1927, although only two of them were released. Rhodes musical instrument of choice was the button accordion. As blues historian, Bengt Olsson, stated the accordion was considered "an unusual instrument for blues playing down in Mississippi".

The recording session took place on December 10, 1927, in Memphis, Tennessee. The musicians present were listed as Walter Rhodes (vocals, accordion, vocal effects); plus 'Pet' and 'Can' (Maylon and Richard "Hacksaw" Harney), (guitars, speech). The songs were "The Crowing Rooster", "Leaving Home Blues", "She's A Girl of Mine" and "Left My Baby Blues". The first two tracks were released by Columbia Records on a 10-inch shellac phonograph record, on February 4, 1928. The label billed them as Walter Rhodes with "Pet and "Can". The few assessments that were made of Rhodes' accordion playing, were generally in comparison between Rhodes simplistic approach, compared to the sophistication of the accompanying guitar work.

Nevertheless, Rhodes recorded 18 months before Charley Patton did, the latter often being cited as the 'Founder of the Delta Blues'.

Patton recorded a song called "Banty Rooster Blues" in June 1929. Lyrically the track contained many similarities to Rhodes' "The Crowing Rooster". More than one source suggests that Patton may well have known Rhodes, as they resided in the same part of Mississippi, and Patton could have learned the song directly from Rhodes.

"Rollin' and Tumblin'" (or "Roll and Tumble Blues"), as recorded by Hambone Willie Newbern in March 1929, is a track whose stylistic origins appear to derive from "The Crowing Rooster" and "Banty Rooster Blues". One historian noted that Newbern "may have taken a commonly used melody from Mississippi/West Tennessee practice".

Rhodes is said to have died in his forties, after being struck by lightning.

== Legacy ==
The six disc boxed set of recordings that comprise Screamin' and Hollerin' the Blues: The Worlds of Charley Patton, included Rhodes' "The Crowing Rooster".

== Discography ==
=== Singles ===
Year	Title (A-side / B-side)	Record label			
Year	Title (A-side / B-side)	Record label	1928	"The Crowing Rooster" / "Leaving Home Blues"	Columbia (Columbia 14289-D)
1928	"She's A Girl of Mine" / "Left My Baby Blues"	Columbia unissued			

=== Compilation albums (selected) ===
Year	Title	Record label	Track(s)	Reference				
Year	Title	Record label	Track(s)	Reference	1994	Memphis Blues: Complete Recorded Works 1927-1938	Document	"The Crowing Rooster" / "Leaving Home Blues"
2001	Screamin' and Hollerin' the Blues: The Worlds of Charley Patton	Revenant	"The Crowing Rooster"					
2007	When the Levee Breaks: Mississippi Blues, Rare Cuts 1926-41	JSP	"The Crowing Rooster" / "Leaving Home Blues"					
