= Malvina My Sweet Woman =

Big Joe Williams album

Studio album by Big Joe Williams
- Released: 1974
- Recorded: 1951, 1952, 1973
- Genre: Delta blues
- Length: 52:24
- Label: Oldie Blues, OL 2804
- Producer: Martin van Olderen

Big Joe Williams chronology
Blues From The Mississippi Delta (1972)	Malvina My Sweet Woman (1974)	The Legacy Of The Blues, Vol. 6 (1974)

Malvina My Sweet Woman (Compact Disc)

Studio album by Big Joe Williams
- Released: 1997
- Label: Oldie Blues, OLCD 7004

Professional ratings
Review scores
Source	Rating
Allmusic	4/5 stars
Muziekweb	4/5 stars

Malvina My Sweet Woman is an album by American Delta blues guitarist, singer and songwriter Big Joe Williams.

== Content ==
The album consists of ten home recorded songs from 1951/52 preserved on acetates and nine songs recorded live in March 1973 in the Zodiac Club in Amstelveen in the Netherlands. The album was released in 1974 on the Oldie Blues label as OL 2804 and re-issued on CD in 1997 as OLCD 7004. The album was produced by Martin van Olderen with liner notes by Leo W. Bruin.

== Track listing ==
Side one (The home recordings 1951/52)

1. "Whistling Pine Blues"
2. "Mama Don't Allow No Doggin' All Night Long"
3. "Thousand Year Blues"
4. "She's Been Shaking A Little Boogie"
5. "Strange Girl Blues"
6. "Early Morning Blues"
7. "Shake A Little Boogie"
8. "Early In The Morning"
9. "New Car Blues"
10. "Taylor Made Stomp"

Side two (Live in the Zodiac Club in Amstelveen, March 24, 1973)

1. "You Done Me Wrong"
2. "Black Rat Blues"
3. "Poor Beggar"
4. "Everyday Brings Out A Change"
5. "Baby Don't You Wanna Go"
6. "Highway 61 Blues"
7. "Rooster Blues"
8. "Rollin' In Your Arms"
9. "You Are My Sunshine"

== Personnel ==
- Big Joe Williams - guitar (all tracks), vocals (side one: 1,2,7,8,9,10, side two: all tracks)
- Tree Top Slim - vocals (side one: 3,4)
- Sam Fowler - harmonica (side one: 1–8)
- J. D. Short - wash tub bass or guitar (side one: 1–4)
- Lee Willmans - vocals (side one: 5,6)
- Harp Blowing Sam - vocals (side one: 7,8)
- Willie Ealey - piano (side one: 9,10)
