= Mississippi Matilda =

- Also known as: Matilda Powell
- Born: Matilda Witherspoon; January 27, 1914; Hattiesburg, Mississippi, United States
- Died: November 15, 1978 (aged 64) Chicago, Illinois, United States
- Genres: Delta blues
- Occupations: Singer, songwriter
- Instrument: Vocals
- Years active: 1930s
- Label: Bluebird Records
- Formerly of: Sonny Boy Nelson

Matilda Powell Williams (January 27, 1914 – November 15, 1978), known in her professional career as Mississippi Matilda, was an American Delta blues singer and songwriter. In 1936, at her only recording session, she waxed four self-penned songs. Only three were released at the time, although all four have since appeared on various compilation albums. She is best known for her track, "Hard Working Woman".

== Biography ==
She was born Matilda Witherspoon in Hattiesburg, Mississippi, United States, a child of Dallas and Anna Witherspoon. Her mother died when Matilda was five years old, and she was brought up by a relative. She attended school in Bogalusa, Louisiana, and started singing in the local church choir at the age of 12. Two years later she married Calvin Bass and had two children of her own by the age of 18. In her teenage years, Matilda also sang with the Florida Orange Blossom Minstrels. She and Bass separated and she relocated to Hollandale, Mississippi, where she met Eugene Powell, who was six years her elder. He became known in his professional career as Sonny Boy Nelson. They were married in 1935. The couple, in the company of Willie Harris, Robert Hill, and members of the Mississippi Sheiks, traveled to New Orleans, Louisiana, to record for Bluebird Records. Billed as Mississippi Matilda, she recorded four self-penned sides, including her signature song, "Hard Working Woman." The tracks were created, as part of a larger recording session at St. Charles Hotel, New Orleans, on October 15, 1936. The two guitar accompaniment to Mississippi Matilda's vocals were supplied by her husband Sonny Boy Nelson and Willie Harris. As Bluebird stated on their liner notes, Mississippi Matilda "is a fascinating singer, especially on her masterpiece, 'Hard Working Woman', with its deliberately breathless falsettos suddenly descending into her natural register at the end of the verses. Powell plays lilting guitar figures behind her, and Harris supplies a somewhat distantly recorded, but attractively dissonant, chordal backup". Those four sides from 1936 remain as her entire recorded legacy. Her song, "Peel Your Banana", was unreleased at that time.

In 1942, the Powells relocated to Greenville, Mississippi, where her husband had found employment at the John Deere plant, to help support their by now large family. She and her husband separated in 1952, and she relocated to Chicago, Illinois, with their six children. Matilda subsequently remarried and raised a total of ten children.

Three of her four songs were included in the compilation album, Mississippi Blues Vol. 3 Complete Recordings of Robert Petway, Mississippi Matilda, Sonny Boy Nelson, issued by Document Records.

She died in Chicago, Illinois, on November 15, 1978, and was interred at Burr Oak Cemetery.

== Legacy ==
Sue Foley recorded her version of "Hard Working Woman" (billed as "Hardworking Woman"), on her 2004 Ruf Records release, Change.

== Discography ==
Session recorded on October 15, 1936
Catalogue #	Title
Bluebird BS–02593	"Peel Your Banana"
Bluebird BS–02594	"A and V Blues"
Bluebird BS–02595	"Hard Working Woman"
Bluebird BS–02596	"Happy Home Blues"

== See also ==
- List of Delta blues musicians
