= Jim Jackson (musician) =

American blues singer and guitarist

- Jackson (left) and King Vidor on the set of the 1929 film Hallelujah!

Background information
- Born: June 1876; Hernando, Mississippi, U.S.
- Died: December 18, 1933 (aged 57) Memphis, Tennessee, U.S.
- Genres: Blues; hokum
- Instruments: Guitar; vocals
- Years active: 1905–1933
- Labels: Vocalion; Victor

Jim Jackson (June 1876 – December 18, 1933) was an American blues and hokum singer, songster, and guitarist whose recordings in the late 1920s were popular and influential on later musicians.

== Biography ==
Jackson was born in Hernando, Mississippi. The researchers Bob Eagle and Eric LeBlanc date his birth as 1876, but other sources give 1884 or 1890. He was raised on a farm, where he learned to play guitar. Around 1905 he started working as a singer, dancer, and musician in medicine shows and played at dances and parties, often with other local musicians, such as Gus Cannon, Frank Stokes and Robert Wilkins. He soon began travelling with the Rabbit Foot Minstrels, featuring Ma Rainey and Bessie Smith, and other minstrel shows.

He also played in clubs on Beale Street in Memphis, Tennessee. His popularity and proficiency secured him a residency at the prestigious Peabody Hotel in Memphis in 1919. Like Lead Belly, Jackson knew hundreds of songs, including blues, ballads, vaudeville numbers, and traditional tunes, and became a popular attraction.

In 1927 the talent scout H. C. Speir obtained for him a recording contract with Vocalion Records. On October 10, 1927, he recorded "Jim Jackson's Kansas City Blues", which became a best-seller. Its melody and lyrics can be traced in many later blues and rock and roll songs, including "Rock Around the Clock" and "Kansas City". Following this hit Jackson recorded a series of "Kansas City" follow-ups and soundalikes. Other artists recorded cover versions of the song (including William Harris in 1928) and reworked it (as Charlie Patton did, changing it to "Gonna Move to Alabama"). Jackson moved to Memphis in 1928 and made a series of further recordings, including the comic medicine show song "I Heard the Voice of a Pork Chop". He also appeared in King Vidor's all-black 1929 film Hallelujah!, though it is unclear what role he played.

Jackson ran the Red Rose Minstrels, a travelling medicine show which toured Mississippi, Arkansas and Alabama. As a talent scout for Brunswick Records, he discovered Rufus "Speckled Red" Perryman, gaining him his first recording session. Shortly afterwards, in February 1930, Jackson recorded his last session. He later moved back to Hernando and continued to perform until his death in 1933. In 2023 a tombstone was installed at Jackson's previously unmarked grave.

== Legacy ==
Janis Joplin later recorded a version of "Kansas City Blues", inserting the lyrics "Babe, I'm leavin', yeah I'm a-leavin' this mornin' / Goin' to Kansas City to bring Jim Jackson home".

Jackson was a major influence on the Chicago bluesman J. B. Lenoir. Jackson's "Kansas City Blues" was a regular fixture of Robert Nighthawk's concert set list. Brownie McGhee said "Kansas City Blues" was "the first tune that I ever learned to play." (Seattle Folklore Society video).

The song "Wild About My Lovin'" was covered by the Lovin' Spoonful and released on their 1965 debut album, Do You Believe in Magic.

His song "This Morning She Was Gone" was recorded by Mark Spoelstra in 1963 as "She's Gone".

The Youngbloods recorded the song as "Grizzly Bear" in 1966.

== See also ==
- List of blues musicians
- First rock and roll record

== Recommended recording ==
- Jim Jackson Vols. 1–2 (Document Records)
