= Jim Jackson's Kansas City Blues =

"Jim Jackson's Kansas City Blues – Pt. 1"

Single by Jim Jackson
- B-side: "Jim Jackson's Kansas City Blues – Pt. 2"
- Released: 1927
- Recorded: October 10, 1927
- Genre: Blues
- Label: Vocalion
- Songwriter: Jim Jackson

"Jim Jackson's Kansas City Blues" is a 1927 song, written and recorded by the American blues musician Jim Jackson. He recorded it on October 10, 1927 for Vocalion Records, who released it as a two-part A-side and B-side single. It was Jackson's first record and an early blues hit. Music writer Peter Silvester suggests it was one of the first million-seller records. This sales figure is disputed, but the recording was "immensely popular... and became a standard among Mississippi and Memphis bluesmen".

William Harris's second and final recording stint occurred over three days in October 1928, in Richmond, Indiana, and included Harris's cover of the song. Jackson was also a medicine show singer and it is supposed that the two men knew each other from that time.

The song's melody line was re-used and developed by Charlie Patton ("Going to Move to Alabama") and Hank Williams ("Move It on Over") before emerging in "Rock Around the Clock", and its lyrical content presaged Leiber and Stoller's "Kansas City". The song contains the line "It takes a rocking chair to rock, a rubber ball to roll", which had previously been used in 1924 by Ma Rainey in "Jealous Hearted Blues", and which Bill Haley would later incorporate into his 1952 recording, "Sundown Boogie."

Both Robert Nighthawk and Harmonica Frank recorded versions of "Kansas City Blues" in 1951.

Janis Joplin later recorded a song she called "Kansas City Blues". Her lyrics included "Goin' to Kansas City to bring Jim Jackson home".
