= Will Dockery =

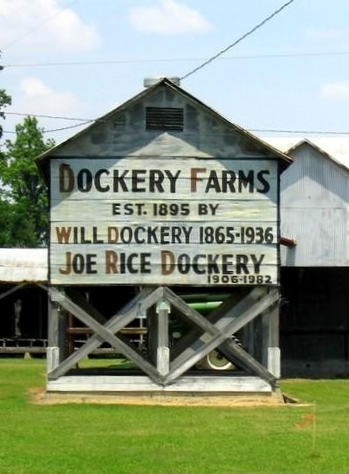
Dockery Plantation cotton gin, May 2005

William Alfred Dockery (November 10, 1865 – December 29, 1936) was an American landowner who built from scratch the Dockery Plantation, the famous home of such original Delta blues musicians as Charley Patton, Robert Johnson, Son House, Howlin' Wolf, Willie Brown, Tommy Johnson, and Pops Staples.

== Plantation ==
Dockery's parents left the Carolinas sometime before the American Civil War and settled in Mississippi as farmers, but were left poor by the war's end. Dockery was born in Love, Mississippi, and went on to graduate from the University of Mississippi in 1885. He left the family farm and purchased, with a $1000 gift from his grandmother, tracts of forest and marshland outside of Cleveland, Mississippi in the Mississippi Delta between the Yazoo River and the Sunflower River. First he went into the lumber business, cutting trees and building a sawmill. As he made more money he acquired more land; realizing that the bottom soil was rich, he cleared the trees, drained the marshes of malaria-carrying mosquitoes and began to plant cotton. It subsequently became known that Dockery needed manual labor, and he was willing to pay for it, so laborers flocked there. Eventually, Will Dockery built a large cotton gin, a post office and a company store which produced its own money. By the 1930s, Dockery plantation covered 28 square miles (73 km^{2}) of rich fertile river delta lowland. Will Dockery earned a reputation for treating his workers fairly.

Over the years, black laborers began to migrate to the Dockery Plantation, to work in the fields and become tenant farmers or sharecroppers, a system in which they leased land to cultivate, paying the owner a share of the crop. The families lived on their land and grew their own gardens. Often peripatetic blues musicians were attracted there for itinerant work and they lived in what were called the "quarters" for bachelors, known for the partying and drinking going on there. Here musicians, often drunk, played their music far into the night. The guitar was particularly suited to the rural Mississippi Delta musician.

The Mississippi Blues Commission placed a historic marker at the site of the plantation in recognition of its enormous importance in the development of the Mississippi blues.

== The blues ==
It is difficult to find traces of the earliest blues styles, but it was in the delta, in Cleveland, Mississippi, that W.C. Handy heard a man singing a blues in 1895.

Although the complete history will never be known, there is a central theme to the development of what is known as the blues, and that is the plantation that Will Dockery built outside of Cleveland. Although Dockery was unaware of the music his laborers played in their quarters at "house parties" during their off hours, his plantation provided a particularly fertile atmosphere for musicians to gather and play their music while others listened and danced. It is difficult to know what Mississippi music would have emerged without the musical mix of Tommy Johnson, Charley Patton, and Robert Johnson.

== Historic marker ==
A marker designating Dockery Plantation as a site on the Mississippi Blues Trail is an acknowledgment of the important contribution of the plantation to the development of the blues in Mississippi.

The marker was placed in Cleveland, Mississippi. Governor Haley Barbour stated:

I’m pleased to include Dockery Plantation on the Mississippi Blues Trail. Apart from the town’s unique historical legacy, which includes printing its own money, Dockery was home to famed Bluesman Charley Patton and played a significant role in the development of the Delta Blues.
