= Hand Me Down My Old Walking Stick =

Studio album by Big Joe Williams
- Released: 1969
- Studio: Mayfair Studios, London, England
- Genre: Blues, Delta blues
- Length: 43:25
- Label: Liberty Records
- Producer: Mike Batt

Big Joe Williams chronology
Thinking of What They Did to Me (1969)	Hand Me Down My Old Walking Stick (1969)	Big Joe Williams (1972)

Hand Me Down My Old Walking Stick is the twelfth solo studio LP album by Big Joe Williams, originally released in 1969. The album was made from a series of solo recordings in October 1968.

== Track listing ==
UK version

Side one
No.	Title	Writer(s)	Length
1.	"Hand Me Down My Old Walking Stick"	Big Joe Williams	3:40
2.	"Mamma' Don't Like Me Runnin' Round"	Williams	3:11
3.	"Baby, Please Don't Go"	Williams	1:56
4.	"Everybody's Gonna Miss Me When I'm Gone"	Williams	2:40
5.	"Buffalo"	Williams	2:54
6.	"Church Bell Ring"	Williams	2:37
7.	"Baby Keeps On Breaking 'Em Down"	Williams	2:52
8.	"Shady Grove"	Williams	3:04

Side two
No.	Title	Writer(s)	Length
1.	"Sittin' N' Thinkin'"	Williams	3:38
2.	"Blues Round The World"	Williams	2:54
3.	"Oh Baby"	Williams	2:36
4.	"Pearly Mae"	Williams	2:30
5.	"Scardie Mama"	Williams	2:50
6.	"She'll Be Coming 'Round the Mountain!"	Traditional	1:14
7.	"Old Folks Tavern"	Williams	2:37
8.	"Take It All"	Williams	2:12

== Personnel ==
- Big Joe Williams – nine-string guitar, vocals
- Mike Batt – producer
- Andrew Lauder – coordinator
- Roy Fisher – coordinator
- Tony McPhee – coordinator, sleeve notes
- Mike Hasted – photography
