= The Complete Plantation Recordings =

Compilation album by Muddy Waters
- Released: June 8, 1993
- Recorded: August 24, 1941 – July 24, 1942
- Studio: Stovall's Plantation and Clarksdale, MS
- Genre: Blues
- Length: 61:39
- Label: Chess; CHD-9344
- Producer: Alan Lomax, John Work, Andy McKaie

Muddy Waters chronology
Blues Sky (1992)	The Complete Plantation Recordings (1993)	One More Mile (1994)

Down on Stovall’s Plantation Cover

The Complete Plantation Recordings, subtitled The Historic 1941-42 Library of Congress Field Recordings, is a compilation album of the blues musician Muddy Waters' first recordings collected by Alan Lomax for the Library of Congress in 1941-42 and released by the Chess label in 1993. Lomax recorded Waters at Stovall Farm in Clarksdale, Mississippi in 1941 and returned the following year to make additional recordings. Thirteen tracks were originally released as Down on Stovall’s Plantation in 1966 on Testament Records.

== Reception ==
Professional ratings
Review scores
Source	Rating
AllMusic	(Down on Stovall’s Plantation)
AllMusic	5/5 stars
The Penguin Guide to Blues Recordings	4/4 stars

The album was inducted into the Blues Hall of Fame in 2001 as a Classic of Blues Recording.

The AllMusic reviewer Cub Koda wrote, "At long last, Muddy's historic 1941-1942 Library of Congress field recordings are all collected in one place, with the best fidelity that's been heard thus far. ... Of particular note are the inclusion of several interview segments with Muddy from that embryonic period and a photo of Muddy playing on the porch of his cabin, dressed up and looking sharper than any Mississippi sharecropper on Stovall's plantation you could possibly imagine. This much more than just an important historical document; this is some really fine music imbued with a sense of place, time and loads of ambience."

== Track listing ==
All compositions credited to McKinley Morganfield except where noted

1. "Country Blues" [Number One] – 3:32
2. Interview #1 – 3:51 Previously unissued
3. "I Be's Troubled" – 3:04
4. Interview #2 – 1:50 Previously unissued
5. "Burr Clover Farm Blues" – 2:54 Previously unissued
6. Interview #3 – 1:13 Previously unissued
7. "Ramblin' Kid Blues" [Partial] – 1:10 Previously unissued
8. "Ramblin' Kid Blues" – 3:15
9. "Rosalie" – 3:02
10. "Joe Turner" (Writer Unknown)– 2:46
11. "Pearlie May Blues" (Writer Unknown) – 3:25
12. "Take a Walk With Me" – 3:04
13. "Burr Clover Blues" – 3:13
14. Interview #4 – 0:34 Previously unissued
15. "I Be Bound to Write You" [First Version] – 3:25
16. "I Be Bound to Write You" [Second Version] – 2:52 Previously unissued
17. "You're Gonna Miss Me When I'm Gone" – 3:25
18. "You Got to Take Sick and Die Some of These Days" – 2:08
19. "Why Don't You Live So God Can Use You?" – 2:07
20. "Country Blues" [Number Two] – 3:34
21. "You're Gonna Miss Me When I'm Gone" – 3:40 Previously unissued
22. "32-20 Blues" (Robert Johnson) – 3:22 Previously unissued

== Personnel ==
- Muddy Waters – vocals, guitar
- Henry "Son" Sims – violin, acoustic guitar (tracks 7–13)
- Percy Thomas – acoustic guitar, vocals (tracks 7–11)
- Charles Berry – acoustic guitar (tracks 15, 16 & 22)
- Louis Ford – mandolin, vocals (tracks 7–11)
