= Pearl Dickson =

American Memphis and country blues singer and songwriter

- Born: Pearl Dixon; October 5, 1903; Somerville, Tennessee, U.S.
- Died: October 24, 1977 (aged 74) Memphis, Tennessee, U.S.
- Genres: Memphis blues; Country blues
- Occupations: Singer; songwriter
- Instrument: Vocals
- Years active: 1920s
- Label: Columbia

Pearl Dickson (born Pearl Dixon, October 5, 1903 – October 24, 1977) was an American Memphis and country blues singer and songwriter. She recorded four songs, "High Yellow Blues", "Twelve Pound Daddy", "Little Rock Blues", and "Guitar Rag". Of these, only "Twelve Pound Daddy" and "Little Rock Blues" were issued. Little is known of Dickson's life outside of her short recording career.

== Early life ==
She was born in Somerville, Tennessee, United States, in 1903.

== Recording and legacy ==
On December 12, 1927, Dickson recorded four tracks, with backing by the guitar playing brothers, Maylon and Richard "Hacksaw" Harney. They were recorded for Columbia Records, in Memphis, Tennessee. For unknown reasons, only one disc containing "Twelve Pound Daddy" and "Little Rock Blues" was released by Columbia in April 1928, on a 10-inch shellac phonograph record. The label billed the ensemble as Pearl Dickson accompanied by "Pet and "Can", the latter being the nicknames of her accompanists.

Some speculation exists that she was related in some way to another obscure blues figure, Tom Dickson. Examples of both person's work have been released on the same compilation album.

According to one source, unlike her forebears' generation, who were obsessed with the idea of an afterlife, the descendants of former slaves spent more of their thinking time pondering the realities of the present, and less so on life after death. The opening two lines of Dickson's self penned song, "Little Rock Blues" were "I started to heaven, but I changed my mind / But I'm going to Little Rock, where I can have a better time". Open to interpretation, Dickson nevertheless indicates that a journey to presumably Little Rock, Arkansas, is a better option than piety, or even suicide. Her lyrics were used as an example in another published text, to illustrate changes in inflection and the tense and modification of verbs within blues lyrics. Stefan Grossman used "Little Rock Blues" as the basis for a track he arranged in 1966, which he called "Little Rock Blues Number Two". Another publication quoted the full lyrics for both "Little Rock Blues" and "Twelve Pound Daddy".

== Death ==
She died in Memphis, Tennessee, in 1977, aged 74.

== Discography ==
=== Singles ===
Year	Title (A-side / B-side)	Main artist	Record label				
Year	Title (A-side / B-side)	Main artist	Record label	1928	"Twelve Pound Daddy" / "Little Rock Blues"	Pearl Dickson	Columbia (Columbia 14286-D)
1928	"High Yellow Blues" / "Guitar Rag"	Pearl Dickson	Columbia unissued				

=== Selected compilation albums ===
Year	Title	Record label
2002	Legendary Blues: Women of Blues	Columbia
2004	Great Women Blues Singers: Gold Collection	Retro Music
