= J.D. Short =

J. D. Short
- Also known as: Jelly Jaw Short, Jaydee Short, and possibly others, including Spider Carter
- Born: December 26, 1902; Port Gibson, Mississippi, United States
- Died: October 21, 1962 (aged 59) St. Louis, Missouri, United States
- Genres: Delta blues, country blues
- Occupation(s): Singer, harmonicist, songwriter
- Instrument(s): Vocals, guitar, harmonica
- Years active: Mid-1920s–1962
- Labels: Sonet (last of various labels)

J. D. Short (December 26, 1902 – October 21, 1962) was an American Delta blues singer, guitarist, and harmonicist with a distinctive vibrato-laden singing voice. Early in his career, he recorded under a number of pseudonyms, including Jelly Jaw Short. His noteworthy works include "Lonesome Swamp Rattlesnake" and "You're Tempting Me".

== Biography ==
Short was born in Port Gibson, Mississippi. He was a cousin of Big Joe Williams and David "Honeyboy" Edwards. He learned to play the piano and the guitar at an early age. He later mastered the harmonica, saxophone, clarinet, and drums. He performed locally in the Mississippi Delta at house parties. In 1923, he relocated to St. Louis, Missouri.

Short went on to play with the Neckbones, Henry Spaulding, Honeyboy Edwards, Douglas Williams, and his cousin, Big Joe Williams. In the 1930s, he recorded for Vocalion Records. The musician Henry Townsend, in his autobiography, A Blues Life, told of an incident in St. Louis in which, seemingly out of jealousy of Townsend's musical standing, Short attacked and stabbed him twice. Later, by way of revenge, Townsend shot Short in the genitals, destroying Short's testicles. The account was also mentioned in Townsend's obituary in The Guardian. Short continued performing in St. Louis after World War II, often as a one-man band and sometimes with his cousin, Big Joe Williams.

Short disappeared from the music industry for more than two decades before re-emerging during the blues revival of the 1960s. He achieved national recognition and went on to record for Delmark Records and Folkways Records. Later, some of his recordings were released by Sonet Records.

Short appeared in a documentary film entitled The Blues that was released in 1963, where he was featured singing "Slidin' Delta".

He died of a heart attack in October 1962, at the age of 59, in St. Louis.

Copies of two of Short's Paramount single releases, "Steamboat Rousty" / "Gittin' Up On The Hill", and "Flaggin' It To Georgia" / "Tar Road Blues" are seemingly lost.

== Discography ==
Compilations

- Stavin' Chain Blues, with Big Joe Williams (1961, Delmark Records)
- Blues from the Mississippi Delta, with Son House (1963, Folkways Records)
- Legacy of the Blues Vol. 8 (Sonet 648), 1973, recorded in St. Louis, July 1962

== See also ==
- List of country blues musicians
- List of Delta blues musicians
- List of Memphis blues musicians
