= Andy Rodgers (musician) =

American Delta blues harmonicist, guitarist, singer, and songwriter

- Also known as: Midnight Cowboy; Grand Daddy of the Blues
- Born: March 14, 1922; Liberty, Mississippi, United States
- Died: August 14, 2004 (aged 82) Redding, California, United States
- Genres: Delta blues, Piedmont blues
- Occupations: Harmonicist, guitarist, singer, songwriter
- Instruments: Harmonica, guitar, vocals
- Years active: Early 1930s–2004

Andy Rodgers (March 14, 1922 – August 14, 2004) was an American Delta blues harmonicist, guitarist, singer, and songwriter. A flamboyant character, commonly known as the Midnight Cowboy, Rodgers worked part-time as a musician for most of his lifetime. He recorded two albums in the 1990s.

In his lengthy career, Rodgers variously performed with Carey Bell, Junior Wells, Billy Boy Arnold, Raful Neal, Kenny Neal, Little Walter, Phillip Walker, T-Bone Walker, Little Milton, Cab Calloway, Charles Brown, Boxcar Willie, Rose Maddox, Mickey Gilley, Willie Nelson, Blind Lemon Jefferson, Sonny Rhodes, and David "Honeyboy" Edwards. Rodgers also appeared on television programs, including the Gong Show, You Bet Your Life, and Good Morning America.

== Biography ==
Rodgers was born near to Liberty, Mississippi, one of eighteen children in his family. His parents were sharecroppers. He left home at the age of 12 and drifted from one job to another. His cousins, Sonny Boy Williamson II and Bo Diddley, inspired him to become a musician.

He found full-time employment as a boxer, truck driver, cotton picker and ranch hand. In the latter capacity he acquired the nickname Midnight Cowboy from his boss in Dorris, California, after Rodgers delivered a calf in the dead of the night. When times became particularly difficult, Rodgers resorted to stealing chickens, later recalled in the title of his album Chicken Thief Blues. His vagrant life gave him a wealth of stories, which he retold both in his music and between songs at the impromptu concerts he gave. He recalled being a cotton picker alongside Bo Diddley, wrestling a bear, placing a defanged rattlesnake in his father's bed, and meeting B.B. King.

Rodgers appeared on the television program The Gong Show in 1976 and 1977 (he won on both occasions), on Bill Cosby's version of You Bet Your Life (1992), and on Good Morning America. In 1994, Rodgers was given the Humanitarian Award by the Southern California Motion Picture Awards in Oakland, California. He also agreed to the use of his nickname in Midnight Cowboy, the 1969 film starring Dustin Hoffman, and his music was used in the film The Big Easy (1987).

By the late 1980s, Rodgers was able to have a full-time career in music. He recorded released two albums, Freight Train Blues (1992) and Chicken Thief Blues (1995), released by Snowflake Records. In his time he performed with Carey Bell, Junior Wells, Billy Boy Arnold, Raful Neal, Kenny Neal, Little Walter, Phillip Walker, T-Bone Walker, Little Milton, Cab Calloway, Charles Brown, Boxcar Willie, Rose Maddox, Mickey Gilley, Willie Nelson, Blind Lemon Jefferson, Sonny Rhodes, and David "Honeyboy" Edwards. Known for his Piedmont blues style of finger-picking the guitar, Rodgers also played the harmonica in a Delta blues style. He was later known to musicians as the "Grand Daddy of the Blues".

He was inducted into the Cowboy Blues Hall of Fame in Nevada City, California. He also played for President Gerald Ford at the Hilton in Fresno, California.

His hay haulage business was primarily based in Fresno County, California and, later, in Butte Valley and Gridley, where he lived for more than 50 years. A fire at his mobile home forced Rodgers and his longtime companion, Georgie Ann Wadell, to relocate to Fall River Mills, where they lived until his death. The fire destroyed much of his archived music, biography and genealogy research.

Rodgers died of complications due to diabetes in August 2004, at the age of 82, in Redding, Shasta County, California.

== Discography ==
- 1992: Freight Train Blues, Snowflake Records
- 1995: Chicken Thief Blues, Snowflake Records

== See also ==
- List of Delta blues musicians
