= New York Guitar Show =

The New York Guitar Show was an annual charitable event- a two-day vintage guitar exhibition and sale scheduled on the third weekend in September and held at the Mary Help of Christians Church on E. 12th St. and Avenue A in New York City, attended by vintage guitar dealers from across the United States. Throughout 15 years (1986–2000), the New York Guitar Show was the only regularly scheduled vintage guitar event dedicated entirely to charity in the United States.

Originally founded by Ken and Kathy Heer, Saint Mark's Music Exchange was a music event established in 1983-84 in a midtown Manhattan hotel as a for-profit venture. It was later purchased by Skip Henderson, an ex-social worker turned vintage guitar dealer from City Lights Music in New Brunswick, New Jersey. The event was subsequently moved to the auditorium of Mary Help of Christians Church at E. 12th St. and Ave. A and restructured into a not-for-profit initiative primarily aimed at supporting the AIDS Resource Foundation for Children in Newark, New Jersey. East Village music dealers (Saint Mark's Music Exchange) in 1983–84 at a midtown Manhattan hotel as a for-profit event, the production was purchased by Skip Henderson, an ex-social worker turned vintage guitar dealer (City Lights Music) from New Brunswick, New Jersey, moved to the Mary Help of Christians church auditorium at E.12th St. and Ave. A, and changed into a not-for-profit venture primarily to support the AIDS Resource Foundation for Children in Newark, New Jersey. Henderson later went on to establish the non-profit Mount Zion Memorial Fund in Clarksdale, Mississippi, to assist rural black churches in the Mississippi Delta.

The New York Guitar Show was also a venue for a Saturday night performance series that Henderson produced over the lifespan of the event. These shows featured an eclectic array of performers such as Nokie Edwards of the Ventures, guitar maker Semie Moseley, Junior Brown, The LeRoi Brothers, Lonnie Pitchford, Elliot Easton of The Cars, YouTube favorites The Otis Brothers featuring Bob Guida (an early financial backer of the event), and numerous others. In 1996, as Henderson became more involved with the activities of the Mount Zion Memorial Fund, production of the show was transferred to another vintage guitar dealer, James Pasch, with the contractual stipulation that it remain a fundraising event for the AIDS Resource Foundation for Children.

Primarily because of its East Village location, the event was known for attracting a diverse crowd of notable musicians and figures from New York City, such as Billy Idol, Allen Ginsberg, Lenny Kravitz, Willy DeVille, and many others.

In 2013, Mary Help of Christians Church, the original site of the guitar show, was sold for $41 million and demolished despite protests from Greenwich Village historic preservationists. In 1993, Skip Henderson produced a Chorale "The Faith of Avenue A", consisting of selections sung by the Mary Help of Christians Choir. The project, professionally recorded on Neumann microphones by Rob Campbell in the sanctuary, stands as the only recording ever done in the Church.
