= Dick Waterman =

American writer (1935–2024)

Dick Waterman (July 14, 1935 – January 26, 2024) was an American writer, promoter and photographer who was influential in the development and recording of the blues from the 1960s.

== Life and career ==
Dick Waterman was born in Plymouth, Massachusetts, on July 14, 1935. He studied journalism at Boston University in the 1950s. He moved on to write for Broadside Magazine and later became its feature editor. In 1963 he began to promote local shows with blues artists, including Mississippi John Hurt, Booker "Bukka" White and Mississippi Fred McDowell. In 1964 he went to Mississippi on a quest that eventually led to his "rediscovery" of the blues singer Son House.

Following this, he founded Avalon Productions, the first booking agency specifically formed to represent blues artists. Within a few years, he was representing House, White, Hurt, Skip James, Sam "Lightnin'" Hopkins, Arthur Crudup, Junior Wells, J. B. Hutto, and many others. He also promoted concerts by folk and rock acts in the Boston area. In the late 1960s he met a young female guitarist and singer named Bonnie Raitt and encouraged her to begin what has become a long, fruitful music career.

As the older blues artists died, Waterman's responsibilities shifted to care of their estates and providing for their heirs. He moved to Oxford, Mississippi in the 1980s and began a second career publishing the photographs of blues, folk, country and jazz artists that he had been taking since the early 1960s. His book Between Midnight and Day: The Last Unpublished Blues Archive contains about 100 of his photographs from the 1960s onwards.

In 1993, Waterman was instrumental in placing a new headstone on the grave of Mississippi Fred McDowell with funding from Bonnie Raitt through the Mount Zion Memorial Fund. Waterman delivered a tribute to McDowell, an early mentor of younger musicians including Raitt, at the dedication ceremony on August 6, 1993, in Como, Mississippi.

In 2000, he was inducted into the Blues Hall of Fame, as one of the first non-performers to be so honored. In 2014 in Memphis he received a Keeping the Blues Alive award for Photography; in October 2017 he received a Brass Note on Beale Street in Memphis.

Waterman died on January 26, 2024, at the age of 88. The cause of death was congestive heart failure.

== Books and articles ==
- Turner, Tammy L. Dick Waterman: A Life in Blues. Jackson: University Press of Mississippi, 2019
