= Fiddlin' Joe Martin =

American blues musician (1900–1975)

Fiddlin' Joe Martin (January 8, 1900, Edwards, Mississippi – November 2, 1975, Walls, Mississippi) was an American blues musician, who played mandolin on Son House's recording sessions inspired by Alan Lomax in 1941.

Martin was a versatile musician who could play guitar, fiddle, mandolin, washboard and drums. Paul Oliver wrote that he "worked the Delta joints for over fifty years" after leaving Edwards in 1918 when he was fourteen. Martin worked with numerous blues artists including House, Willie Brown, Charley Patton and Howlin' Wolf. He is mostly associated with Woodrow Adams, on all of whose recordings he appeared. Martin and Adams played live together in the Mississippi area until Martin's death.
