= Woodrow Adams =

American musician (1917–1988)

Background information
- Birth name: Woodrow Wilson Adams
- Born: April 9, 1917; Tchula, Mississippi, U.S.
- Died: August 9, 1988 (aged 71); Tunica County, Mississippi, U.S. (probably Robinsonville)
- Genres: Delta Blues
- Occupations: Musician; Farmer
- Instruments: Vocal; Guitar; Harmonica
- Years active: 1940s – c.1961

Woodrow Wilson Adams (April 9, 1917 – August 9, 1988) was an American Delta blues guitarist and harmonica player. He made a late entry into the recording industry, producing three singles. His most accomplished song was "How Long", which offered an insight into his lifestyle. His works were later collected on a compilation album.

Adams was born in Tchula, Mississippi, the son of plantation workers. From an early age, he was taught the rudiments of playing the harmonica and the guitar. Though he is mainly remembered for his music, he did not begin his recording career until the age of 35, when he was making a living as a tractor driver. On May 24, 1952, Adams, backed by the supporting group the 3 B's, recorded "Pretty Baby Blues" at Sun Studios, in Memphis. One member of the group was Fiddlin' Joe Martin, who would appear on all of Adams's recordings and performed live with him throughout his career. The resulting single, released by Checker Records, is now very rare; only one copy is known to still exist.

In 1955, Adams returned to the studio, this time with the Boogie Blues Blasters, to record "Wine Head Woman" for his second single. It represented his transition from blues to a more commercial R&B style. Adams released one more single, "Something on My Mind", in 1961, as a solo effort before returning to his work on a plantation. None of his recordings had much commercial success. The musician David Evans recorded a session with Adams's former backing band in 1967.

Adams's material has been circulated among a wider audience over the years and has received renewed interest. In 1974, two of his previously unissued tracks, "Pony Blues" and "How Long" (arguably his best-known song), were compiled on the album High Water Blues. The song was inspired by Adams's life on a plantation and emulates the instrumental and melodic style of Howlin' Wolf, who taught Adams how to play harmonica, and Wolf's 1954 song, "Baby How Long".

Adams died in Tunica County, Mississippi, in 1988. After all of his past work was steadily released, the compilation album This Is the Blues, Volume 4, containing all of his recorded songs, was issued in 2015.

== Discography ==
=== Singles ===
- "Pretty Baby Blues" b/w "She's Done Come and Gone", Checker Records (Checker 757), 1952
- "Wine Head Woman" b/w "Baby You Just Don't Know", Meteor Records (MR 5033), 1955
- "Something on My Mind" b/w "Sad and Blue", Home of the Blues Records (HB 2523), 1961

=== Compilation ===
- This Is the Blues Volume 4, A Collection of Authentic Blues Recordings, Be! Sharp 692, 2015
