= Dockery Plantation =

Historic house in Mississippi, United States

- Dockery Farms Historic District
- U.S. National Register of Historic Places
- U.S. Historic district
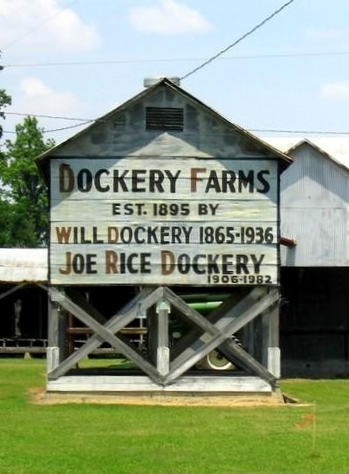
- Dockery Farms in 2005

- Location within Mississippi Location within the United States
- Nearest city: Dockery, Mississippi
- Coordinates: 33°43′44″N 90°36′46″W
- Area: 6 acres (2.4 ha)
- Built: 1930
- NRHP reference No.: 06000250
- Added to NRHP: March 31, 2006

Dockery Plantation was a 25,600-acre (104 km^{2}) cotton plantation and sawmill in Dockery, Mississippi, on the Sunflower River between Ruleville and Cleveland, Mississippi. It is widely regarded as the place where Delta blues music was born. Blues musicians resident at Dockery included Charley Patton, Robert Johnson and Howlin' Wolf. The property was added to the National Register of Historic Places in 2006.

== History ==
The plantation was started in 1895 by Will Dockery (1865–1936), a graduate of the University of Mississippi who originally bought the land for its timber but soon recognized the richness of its soil. At the time, much of the Delta area was still a wilderness of cypress and gum trees, populated by panthers and wolves and subject to mosquitoes. The land was gradually cleared and drained for cotton cultivation, which encouraged an influx of black laborers. Some became settled sharecroppers, who would work a portion of the land in return for a share of the crop, while others were itinerant workers. Dockery earned a good reputation for treating his workers and sharecroppers fairly and thus attracted workers from throughout the South.

Dockery's land was relatively remote, but was opened up for development by a new branch of the Yazoo and Mississippi Valley Railroad, known as the Yellow Dog. Around 1900, Dockery had a rail terminal built on his plantation, so connecting his land with the main rail system at Rosedale. Because of its circuitous route, this local line was known as the "Pea Vine".

Dockery Plantation eventually supported over 2,000 workers, who were paid in the plantation's own coins. In addition to the railroad terminal, it had its own plantation store, post office, school, doctor, and churches. The workers’ quarters included boardinghouses, where they lived, socialized and played music on a variety of instruments, including guitars, accordions, banjos, mandolins, and harmonicas. Dockery took no interest in his workers' music, but he made it easy for them to travel and to spend their leisure time as they pleased.

Charley Patton and his family are believed to have moved around 1900 to the Dockery Plantation, where he came under the influence of an older musician, Henry Sloan. In turn, Patton became the central figure of a group of blues musicians including Willie Brown, Tommy Johnson, and Eddie "Son" House, who played around the local area. Because of its location, central to Sunflower County’s black population of some 35,000 in 1920, the plantation became known as a center for informal musical entertainment. By the mid-1920s, the group widened to include a younger generation of musicians, including Robert Johnson, Chester "Howlin’ Wolf" Burnett, Roebuck "Pops" Staples, and David "Honeyboy" Edwards. Some of these were itinerant workers, while others lived more permanently on the farms.

In 1936, the plantation was inherited by Joe Rice Dockery (1906–1982). With agricultural mechanisation and the employment attractions of the larger cities further north, the plantation settlements gradually disappeared, although some of the historic buildings remain. The farm later diversified to produce corn, rice and soybeans. Later members of the Dockery family have established a foundation to fund research into the Delta blues.

The property was added to the National Register of Historic Places in 2006. Today the site hosts a small number of private tours, lectures, and events in partnership with the Thelonious Monk Institute of Jazz, Delta State University, and other academic and cultural institutions. Dockery is still a working farm, producing soybeans, rice, and corn (but not cotton).

== Historical marker ==
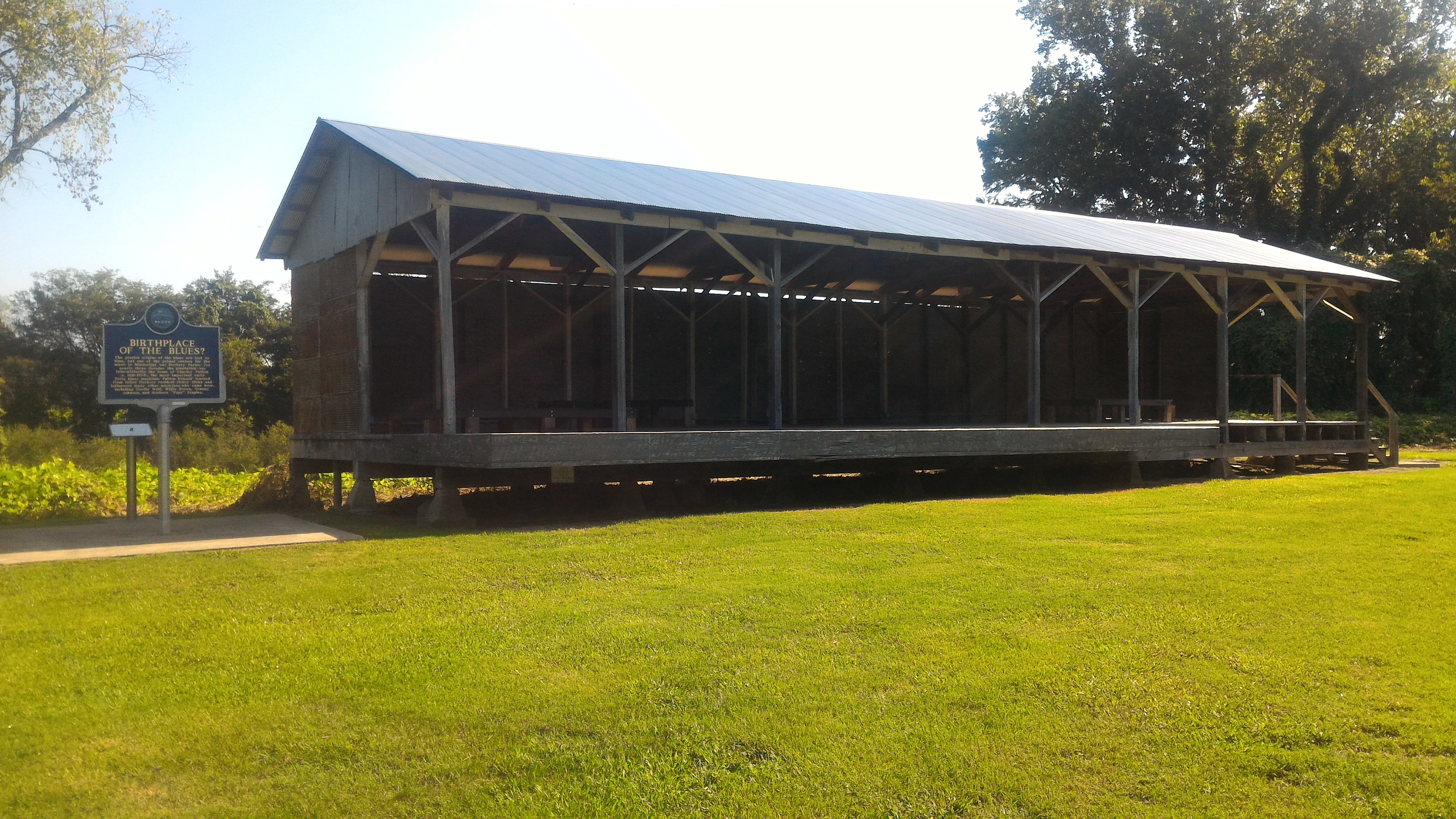
Dockery Plantation Mississippi Blues Trail marker

A marker designating Dockery Plantation as a site on the Mississippi Blues Trail is an acknowledgment of the important contribution of the plantation to the development of the blues in Mississippi.

The marker was placed in Cleveland, Mississippi. Governor Haley Barbour stated

I’m pleased to include Dockery Plantation on the Mississippi Blues Trail. Apart from the town’s unique historical legacy, which includes printing its own money, Dockery was home to famed bluesman Charley Patton and played a significant role in the development of the Delta blues.
