= Henry Sloan =

American Delta blues musician (1870–1948)

- Born: January 1870; Hinds County, Mississippi, United States
- Died: March 13, 1948 (aged 78) Crittenden County, Arkansas, United States
- Genres: Delta blues, country blues
- Instrument: Guitar

Henry Sloan (January 1870 – possibly March 13, 1948) was an American musician, one of the earliest figures in the history of Delta Blues. Very little is known for certain about his life, other than that he tutored Charley Patton in the ways of the blues. There have been suggestions that he moved to Chicago shortly after World War I. He left no known recordings.

== Early life ==
According to researcher David Evans, Sloan was born in Mississippi in 1870, and by 1900 was living in the same community as the Patton and Chatmon families near Bolton, Mississippi. He moved to the Dockery Plantation near Ruleville about the same time as the Pattons, between 1901 and 1904. Patton received some direct instruction from Sloan, and played with him for several years. Two of Patton's later accompanists, Tommy Johnson and Son House, both stated that Patton "dogged every step" of Sloan's.

Further research based on Census records has suggested that, in 1920, Sloan and his family were living around West Memphis, Arkansas. He may have been the Henry Sloan whose death, aged 78, occurred in Crittenden County on March 13, 1948.
