= Henry "Son" Sims =

- Born: Henry Sims; August 22, 1890; Anguilla, Mississippi, United States
- Died: December 23, 1958 (aged 68) Memphis, Tennessee, United States
- Genres: Delta blues
- Occupation(s): Fiddler, songwriter
- Instrument(s): Fiddle, guitar, piano, mandolin
- Years active: 1920s–1950s
- Labels: Paramount

Henry "Son" Sims (August 22, 1890 – December 23, 1958) was an American Delta blues fiddler and songwriter. He is best known as an accompanist for Charley Patton and the young Muddy Waters.

== Life and career ==
Sims was born in Anguilla, Mississippi, the only son of five children. He learned to play the fiddle from his grandfather. Sims served with the US Army in France during World War I.

Sims went on to be the leader of the Mississippi Corn Shuckers, a rural string ensemble, and played with them for a number of years. He joined his childhood friend Charley Patton in a recording session for Paramount Records in Grafton, Wisconsin, in June 1929. Sims accompanied Patton on fiddle on thirteen tracks, including "Elder Greene Blues", "Going to Move to Alabama" and "Devil Sent the Rain Blues"; and recorded four of his own songs, including "Tell Me Man Blues", his best-known composition, and "Farrell Blues". He played alongside Patton at times until the Patton's death in 1934, when Sims returned to working on a plantation. By then he could also play the mandolin, guitar and piano.

On August 28, 1941, Sims accompanied Muddy Waters in a recording session under the direction of Alan Lomax, as part of his recordings for the Library of Congress. In the 1940s, Sims also accompanied Robert Nighthawk on several occasions. He continued a solo career into the 1950s.

Sims died following renal surgery in December 1958 in Memphis, Tennessee, at the age of 68. He was buried in an unmarked grave in Bell Grove Baptist Church Cemetery, in Clarksdale, Mississippi.

== Recordings ==
=== Singles ===
Henry "Son" Sims (vocals), Patton accompanying guitar

Recording Date	Recording Location	Matrix	Song	Paramount Issue #
November 1929	Grafton, Wisconsin	L0046	"Come Back Corrinna"	12912-A
November 1929	Grafton, Wisconsin	L0045	"Farrell Blues"	12912-B
December 1929	Grafton, Wisconsin	L0066	"Be True, Be True Blues"	12940-A
December 1929	Grafton, Wisconsin	L0065	"Tell Me Man Blues"	12940-B

=== Compilation album appearances ===
Title	on album(s)
"Tell Me Man Blues"	Screamin' and Hollerin' the Blues: The Worlds of Charley Patton; Violin, Sing the Blues for Me: African-American Fiddlers 1926–1949
"Farrell Blues"	Screamin' and Hollerin' the Blues: The Worlds of Charley Patton; The Great Race Record Labels, Vol. 1
"Be True, Be True Blues"	Mississippi Blues 1927–1941
"Come Back Corrina"	Screamin' and Hollerin' the Blues: The Worlds of Charley Patton

With Muddy Waters

- The Complete Plantation Recordings (Chess, 1941–42, [1993])

== See also ==
- List of Delta blues musicians
