= Bertha Lee Pate =

American singer (1902–1975)

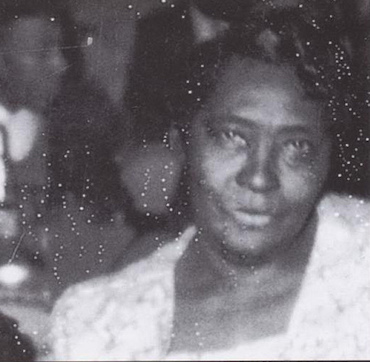

Background information
- Born: June 17, 1902; Flora, Mississippi, U.S.
- Died: May 10, 1975 (aged 72) Chicago, Illinois, U.S.

Bertha Lee Pate, also known as Bertha Lee Jones and, more commonly, just as Bertha Lee (June 17, 1902 – May 10, 1975) was an American classic female blues singer, active in the 1920s and 1930s. She recorded with, and was the common-law wife of Charley Patton.

== Biography ==
When she was five years old, Lee's family moved to Lula, Mississippi. Lee met Patton in 1930 and remained his partner until his death in 1934. During this time, she sang on twelve of Patton's recordings, which resulted in the recording of three of her own songs, "Yellow Bee", "Dog Train Blues", and "Mind Reader Blues". Patton accompanied her on guitar on these records.

In 1933, the couple settled in Holly Ridge, Mississippi. Her relationship with Patton was a turbulent one. In early 1934, both of them were incarcerated in a Belzoni, Mississippi jailhouse after a particularly harsh fight. W. R. Calaway from Vocalion Records bailed the pair out of jail, and escorted them to New York City, for what would be Patton's final sessions (on January 30 and February 1). They later returned to Holly Ridge and Lee saw Patton out in his final days, as he died, according to his death certificate, of a mitral valve disorder on April 28, 1934.

Little else is known of Lee, and her recordings with Patton are the only documents of her voice. The album, Masters of the Delta Blues : The Friends of Charlie Patton contains some of her work.

She died in 1975 in her home near to Chicago, Illinois.
