= High Water Everywhere =

Single by Charley Patton
- A-side: "High Water Everywhere, Part 1"
- B-side: "High Water Everywhere, Part 2"
- Released: 1929
- Recorded: December 1929
- Studio: Paramount, Grafton, Wisconsin
- Genre: Delta blues
- Length: 3:08
- Label: Paramount (no. 12909)
- Songwriter(s): Charley Patton

Charley Patton singles chronology
"Lord I'm Discouraged" (1929)	"High Water Everywhere" (1929)	"Farrell Blues" (1929)

"High Water Everywhere" is a Delta blues song recorded in 1929 by the blues singer Charley Patton. The song is about the Great Mississippi Flood of 1927 and how it affected residents of the Mississippi Delta, particularly the mistreatment of African Americans. Patton recorded it during his second session with Paramount, in late 1929; his recordings from this session are frequently considered his best works.

== Background and lyrical content ==
The song's subject is the Great Mississippi Flood of 1927, the largest flood in American history, which affected much of the Mississippi River valley, devastating large parts of Louisiana and the Mississippi Delta, the home of Patton and many other early bluesmen. The flood exposed inequalities in the treatment of African Americans, and its outcome was a contributing factor to the exodus of many blacks to northern cities. Patton's lyrics include:

I would go to the hill country but they got me barred

Patton was likely referring to the levee in Greenville, Mississippi, where black people were held in the aftermath of the flood and not allowed to leave. They were bound to the custody of the landowners for whom they served as sharecroppers and could not go where they wanted to. The song features Patton's intense vocals and rapid beating on the guitar body. It is regarded as one of the finest of his recordings and considered by some his magnum opus.

Bob Dylan paid tribute to the song in his 2001 "High Water (For Charley Patton)".
