= Cecil Augusta =

American singer-songwriter

Cecil Augusta (born 1920) was an American Delta blues singer and guitarist. He recorded a single track, "Stop All the Buses", for Alan Lomax in Memphis, Tennessee, in 1959, which was ignored until it was released on the album Blues Songbook, a selection of Lomax's field recordings, in 2003. The musicologist David Evans described Augusta as "the perfect example of an artist who shows up at a field recording session and leaves before anyone realizes how good he was" and noted his unique acoustic guitar technique, elements of which later became integral to electric blues playing.
