= Dockery, Mississippi =

- Unincorporated community
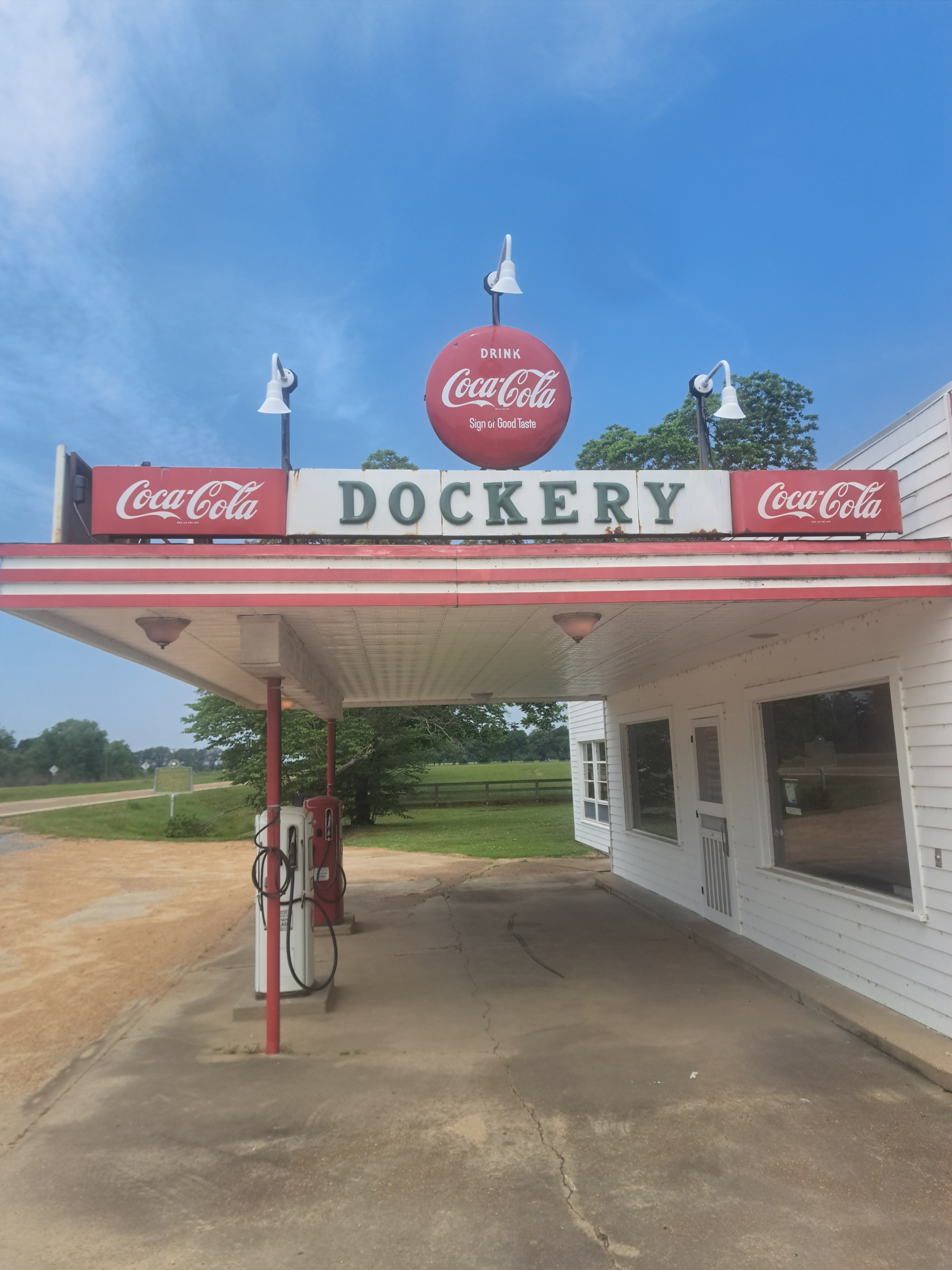
- Old gas station in Dockery

- Location within Mississippi Location within the United States
- Coordinates: 33°43′43″N 90°37′00″W
- Country: United States
- State: Mississippi
- County: Sunflower
- Elevation: 135 ft (41 m)
- Time zone: UTC-6 (Central (CST))
  - Summer (DST): UTC-5 (CDT)
- ZIP code: 38771
- Area code: 662
- GNIS feature ID: 691820

Dockery is an unincorporated community located in Sunflower County, Mississippi. Dockery is located on Mississippi Highway 8 and is approximately 4 miles (6.4 km) east of Cleveland and 4 miles (6.4 km) west of Ruleville.

The historic Dockery Plantation is located in Dockery.
