= Big Joe Williams =

American Delta blues guitarist, singer and songwriter (1903–1982)

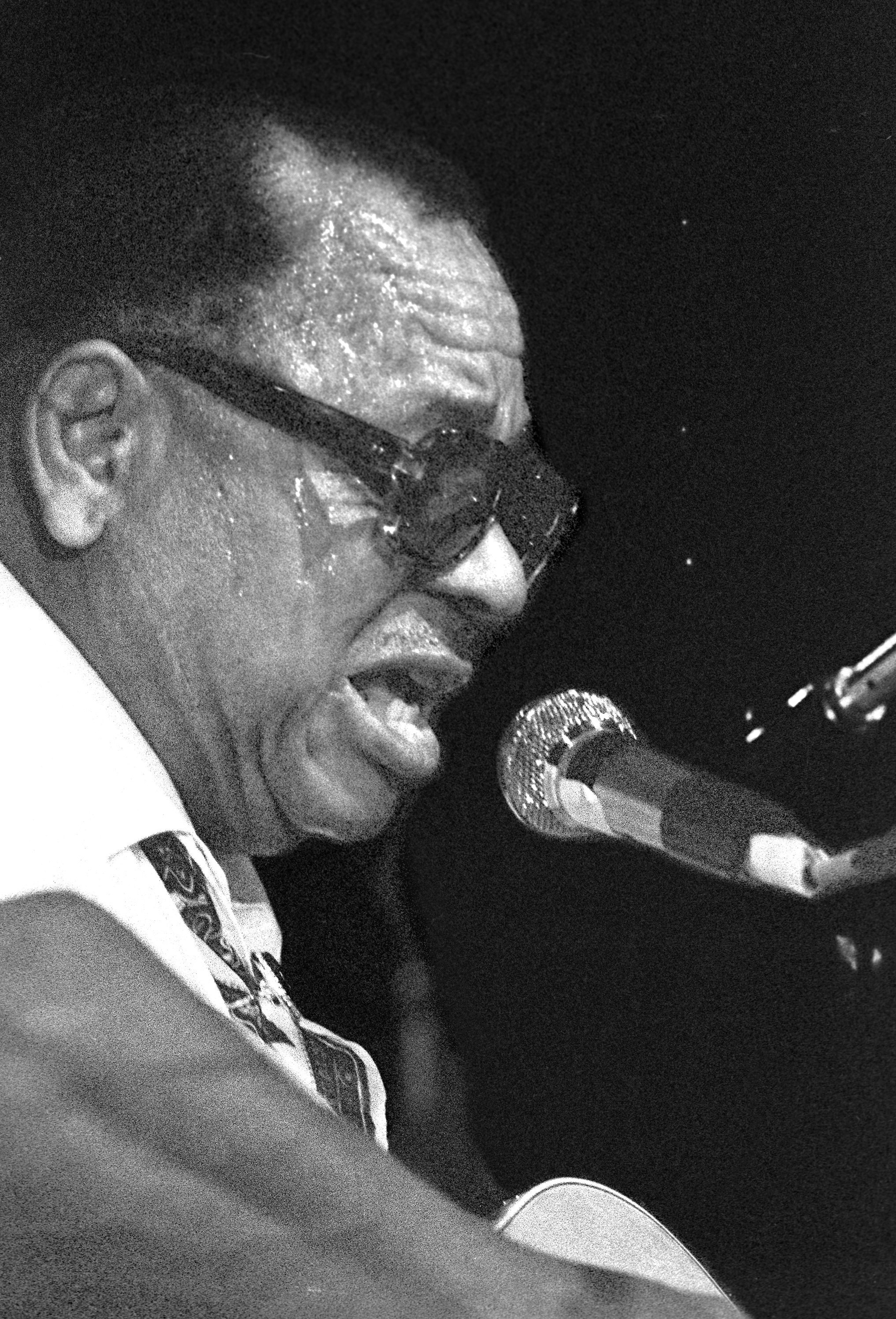
- Williams in concert, November 14, 1971

Background information
- Born: Joseph Lee Williams; October 16, 1903; Oktibbeha County, Mississippi, U.S.
- Died: December 17, 1982 (aged 79) Macon, Mississippi, U.S.
- Genre: Delta blues
- Occupations: Musician; songwriter
- Instruments: Vocals; guitar
- Labels: Bluebird; Delmark; Okeh; Prestige; Vocalion; Trumpet

Joseph Lee Williams (October 16, 1903 – December 17, 1982) was an American Delta blues guitarist, singer, and songwriter, notable for the distinctive sound of his nine-string guitar. Performing over five decades, he recorded the songs "Baby, Please Don't Go", "Crawlin' King Snake", and "Peach Orchard Mama", among many others, for various record labels. He was inducted into the Blues Hall of Fame on October 4, 1992.

The blues historian Barry Lee Pearson (Sounds Good to Me: The Bluesman's Story, Virginia Piedmont Blues) described Williams's performance:

When I saw him playing at Mike Bloomfield's "blues night" at the Fickle Pickle, Williams was playing an electric nine-string guitar through a small ramshackle amp with a pie plate nailed to it and a beer can dangling against that. When he played, everything rattled but Big Joe himself. The total effect of this incredible apparatus produced the most buzzing, sizzling, African-sounding music I have ever heard.

== Early life and career ==
Born a few miles west of Crawford in Oktibbeha County, Mississippi, Williams as a youth began wandering across the United States busking and playing in stores, bars, alleys, and work camps. In the early 1920s he worked in the Rabbit Foot Minstrels revue. He recorded with the Birmingham Jug Band in 1930 for Okeh Records.

In 1934, he was in St. Louis, Missouri, where he met the record producer Lester Melrose, who signed him to Bluebird Records in 1935. He stayed with Bluebird for ten years, recording such blues hits as "Baby, Please Don't Go" (1935) and "Crawlin' King Snake" (1941), both of which were later covered by many other musicians. He also recorded with other blues singers, including Sonny Boy Williamson, Robert Nighthawk, and Peetie Wheatstraw. Around this time he was reportedly married to St. Louis blues singer Bessie Mae Smith, who he sometimes credited with writing "Baby, Please Don't Go".

During the early 1930s, Williams was accompanied on his travels through the Mississippi Delta by a young Muddy Waters. Williams recounted to Blewett Thomas, "I picked Muddy up in Rolling Fork when he was about 15. He went all 'round the Delta playin' harmonica behind me. But I had to put him down after a while. All these women were comin' up to me and sayin', 'Oh. your young son is so nice!' See, I had to put Muddy down because he was takin' away my women."

== Festival fame ==
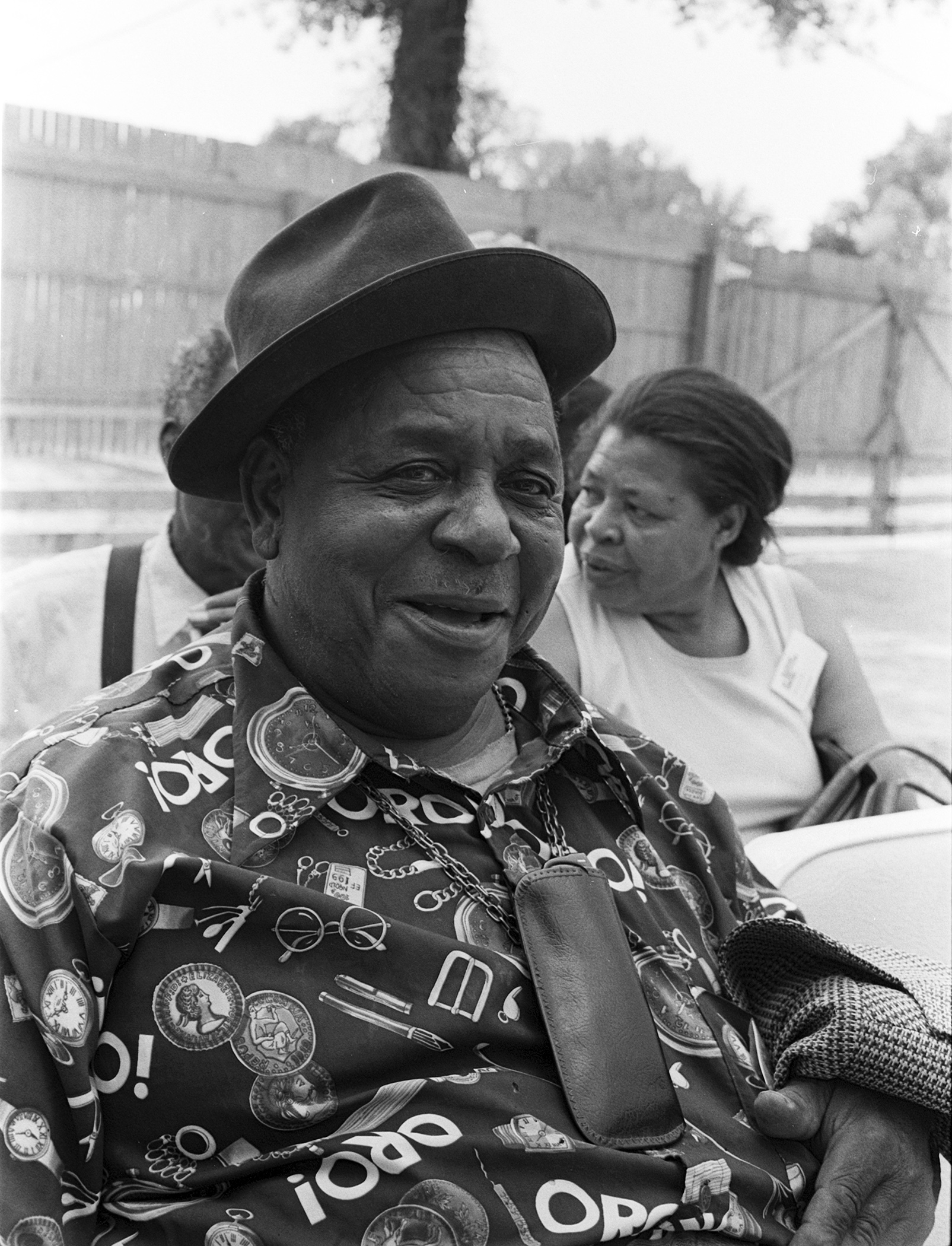
Big Joe Williams, Smithsonian Folklife Festival, 1976.

Williams remained a noted blues artist in the 1950s and 1960s, when his guitar style and vocals became popular with folk blues fans. He recorded for Trumpet, Delmark, Prestige, Vocalion and other labels. He became a regular on the concert and coffeehouse circuits, touring Europe and Japan in the late 1960s and early 1970s and performing at major U.S. music festivals.

Williams also had an influence on a young Bob Dylan during the early 1960s. According to Lenni Brenner ("How Dylan Found His Voice: Big Joe Williams, the Lower East Side, Peyote and the Forging of Dylan's Art"), Williams encouraged Dylan to move away from singing traditional songs and write his own music. Williams later said, "Bob wrote me thanking me for the advice I had given him about music. What he earned, what he done, he got it honest. They ask me, 'Is he real?' and I tell them that they should let him live his own life." Williams and Dylan also recorded several duets in 1962 for Victoria Spivey's label, Spivey Records.

Marc Miller described a 1965 performance in Greenwich Village:

Sandwiched in between the two sets, perhaps as an afterthought, was the bluesman Big Joe Williams (not to be confused with the jazz and rhythm and blues singer Joe Williams who sang with Count Basie). He looked terrible. He had a big bulbous aneuristic protrusion bulging out of his forehead. He was equipped with a beat up old acoustic guitar which I think had nine strings and sundry homemade attachments and a wire hanger contraption around his neck fashioned to hold a kazoo while keeping his hands free to play the guitar. Needless to say, he was a big letdown after the folk rockers. My date and I exchanged pained looks in empathy for what was being done this Delta blues man who was ruefully out of place. After three or four songs the unseen announcer came on the p. a. system and said, "Lets have a big hand for Big Joe Williams, ladies and gentlemen; thank you, Big Joe". But Big Joe wasn't finished. He hadn't given up on the audience, and he ignored the announcer. He continued his set and after each song the announcer came over the p. a. and tried to politely but firmly get Big Joe off the stage. Big Joe was having none of it, and he continued his set with his nine-string acoustic and his kazoo. Long about the sixth or seventh song he got into his groove and started to wail with raggedy slide guitar riffs, powerful voice, as well as intense percussion on the guitar and its various accoutrements. By the end of the set he had that audience of jaded '60s rockers on their feet cheering and applauding vociferously. Our initial pity for him was replaced by wondrous respect. He knew he had it in him to move that audience, and he knew that thousands of watts and hundreds of decibels do not change one iota the basic power of a song.

Williams's guitar playing was in the Delta blues style and yet was unique. He played driving rhythm and virtuosic lead lines simultaneously and sang over it all. He played with picks on his thumb and index finger. His guitar was heavily modified. Williams added a rudimentary electric pickup, whose wires coiled all over the top of his guitar. He also added three extra strings, creating unison pairs for the first, second and fourth strings. His guitar was usually tuned to open G (D2 G2 D3D3 G3 B3B3 D4D4), with a capo placed on the second fret to set the tuning to the key of A. During the 1920s and 1930s, Williams gradually added the extra strings to prevent other guitarists from playing his guitar. In his later years, he occasionally used a 12-string guitar tuned to open G. Williams sometimes tuned a six-string guitar to a modification of open G: the bass D string (D2) was replaced with a .08-gauge string and tuned to G4. The resulting tuning was (G4 G2 D3 G3 B3 D4), with the G4 string being used as a melody string. This tuning was used exclusively for slide playing.

== Back to Mississippi ==
Williams died December 17, 1982, in Macon, Mississippi. He was buried in a private cemetery outside Crawford, near the Lowndes County line. His headstone was primarily paid for by friends and partially funded by a collection taken up among musicians at Clifford Antone's nightclub in Austin, Texas, organized by the music writer Dan Forte, and erected through the Mount Zion Memorial Fund on October 9, 1994. The harmonica virtuoso Charlie Musselwhite, a one-time touring companion, delivered the eulogy at the unveiling. Williams's epitaph, composed by Forte, proclaims him "King of the 9 String Guitar".

Remaining funds raised for Williams's memorial were donated by the Mount Zion Memorial Fund to the Delta Blues Museum, in order to purchase one of the last guitars Williams used from his sister Mary May. The guitar purchased by the museum is a 12-string guitar that Williams used in his later days. The last nine-string (a 1950s Kay cutaway converted to Williams's nine-string specifications) is missing at this time. Williams' previous nine-string (converted from a 1944 Gibson L-7 presented to him by Wilson Ramsay, known as Beef Stew, a name given to him by Williams) is in the possession of Williams's road agent and fellow traveler, Blewett Thomas.

Another of Williams's nine-string guitars is kept under the counter of the Jazz Record Mart in Chicago, which is owned by Bob Koester, the founder of Delmark Records. Williams can be seen playing the nine-string guitar in American Folk-Blues Festival: The British Tours, 1963–1966, released on DVD in 2007.

In 2003, Williams was honored with a marker on the Mississippi Blues Trail in Crawford.

== Discography ==
=== Studio albums ===
- Piney Woods Blues (1958)
- Tough Times (1960)
- Blues on Highway 49 (1961)
- Nine String Guitar Blues (1961, later re-released as Walking Blues)
- Mississippi's Big Joe Williams and His Nine-String Guitar (1962)
- Blues for Nine Strings (1963)
- Back to the Country (1964)
- Ramblin' and Wanderin' Blues (1964)
- Classic Delta Blues (1964)
- Studio Blues (1966)
- Big Joe Williams (1966)
- Thinking of What They Did to Me (1969)
- Hand Me Down My Old Walking Stick (1969)
- Big Joe Williams (1972)
- Blues from the Mississippi Delta (1972)
- Don't Your Plums Look Mellow Hanging on Your Tree (1974)

=== Live album ===
- At Folk City (1962)

=== Collaborative albums ===
- Three Kings And The Queen (1962, P.1964 Spivey LP 1004) with Victoria Spivey, Lonnie Johnson, Roosevelt Sykes, Bob Dylan
- Stavin' Chain Blues (1966), with J.D. Short
- Hell Bound and Heaven Sent (1964), with John Wesley (Short Stuff) Macon
- Three Kings And The Queen, Volume Two (1970, P.2013) (Spivey LP 1014) with Victoria Spivey, Memphis Slim, Roosevelt Sykes, Lonnie Johnson

=== Selected compilations ===
- Crawlin' King Snake (1970)
- Malvina My Sweet Woman (1974)
- Big Joe Williams WarnerBlues Les Incontournables (1998)

=== Posthumous albums ===
- Shake Your Boogie (1990)
- Going Back to Crawford (1999), recorded 1971, with Austen Pete, John "Shortstuff" Macon, Glover Lee Connor and Amelia Johnson

== Quotations ==
- "When I went back down South, boy, they'd put me up on top of a house to hear me play."
