= Sonny Boy Nelson =

- Born: Eugene Powell; December 23, 1908; Utica, Mississippi, United States
- Died: November 4, 1998 (aged 89) Greenville, Mississippi, United States
- Genres: Delta blues

Sonny Boy Nelson (December 23, 1908 – November 4, 1998) was an American Delta blues musician.

== Biography ==
He was born Eugene Powell, in Utica, Mississippi, United States, the child of an interracial affair. His white father soon abandoned the family. His family moved to a plantation at Lombardy near Shelby, Mississippi. He learned to play the guitar by the age of seven. He and his half-brother Ben (playing mandolin) performed as a novelty act at picnics and suppers and for prisoners at the Mississippi State Penitentiary. In 1915, his half-brother Bennie "Sugar" Wilson may have been the inspiration for Nelson to learn to play the mandolin-banjo. Nelson became friends with the Chatmon family (see Sam Chatmon), as both families worked together on the Kelly Drew Plantation, in Hollandale, Mississippi.

In 1935, he married the singer Mississippi Matilda. The following year, the couple, in the company of Willie Harris, Robert Hill, and members of the Mississippi Sheiks, traveled to New Orleans, Louisiana, to record for Bluebird Records. She and Nelson separated in 1952, and she relocated to Chicago, Illinois, with their six children.

Nelson played many instruments, including banjo, guitar, harmonica, horn, mandolin and violin. He played lead most of the time when accompanied by another musician. Nelson's guitar was a Silvertone in which he inserted an aluminium resonator similar to those of the National guitar. He also fitted a seventh string, using 12-string models as inspiration. The extra string was C an octave higher than the conventional string. Later electric styles overshadowed his fame, and he went on to live a quiet life until his death.

Nelson died in November 1998, in Greenville, Mississippi, at the age of 89.
