= Willie Lofton =

American singer

- Lofton in 1935; The only known photograph of Lofton

Background information
- Also known as: Poor Boy
- Born: January 1897; Copiah County, Mississippi, U.S.
- Died: 1956 or c. 1962 Copiah County, Mississippi, U.S.
- Genre: Delta blues
- Occupation: Musician
- Instruments: Vocal; Guitar; Kazoo

Willie "Poor Boy" Lofton (January 1897 – 1956 or c. 1962) was an American Delta blues singer-guitarist. He recorded eight sides for Decca Records and Bluebird Records, adopting a style strikingly similar to Tommy Johnson's. Lofton never achieved much commercial success or recognition in his lifetime, but his rendition of Johnson's "Big Road Blues" has been revitalized on compilation albums.

Not much is known about Lofton's personal life, although musician Plastic Crimewave, writing in his column The Secret History of Chicago Music, stated that Lofton most likely was born in Florence, Mississippi, sometime in 1905. He worked as a barber in Jackson and also played the blues, performing regularly with influential Delta blues musicians Tommy Johnson and Ishmon Bracey. Johnson, in particular, was hugely impactful on Lofton's own style, as he soon adopted Johnson's fast-paced staccato guitar playing and falsetto singing.

Lofton relocated to Chicago in 1934, recording and releasing the songs "Poor Boy Blues" and "It's Killin' Me" on Decca Records, with two additional songs from the session released in early 1935. In January 1935, he recorded "Dirty Mistreater" and "Rainy Day Blues", the former of which adopted guitar lines from Johnson. Lofton may have also been an uncredited guitarist for recordings completed by Kansas Joe McCoy later in the year. In November 1935, Lofton recorded his two most highly regarded songs of his brief recording career with pianist Black Bob Hudson on Bluebird Records, "Beer Garden Blues" and a rendition of Johnson's "Big Road Blues", retitled "Dark Road Blues". Plastic Crimewave praised Lofton's rewritten lyrics on "Dark Road Blues" as a "part of the DNA of the entire blues tradition".

In 1942, Lofton returned to Jackson without achieving much commercial success from his records. He reportedly died in 1962. Lofton's work has been released numerous times on Mississippi Delta blues compilation albums as early as 1964, including Dark Road Blues, Jackson Blues 1928-1938, Mississippi Blues, Volume 2, and Tommy Johnson and Associates. His interpretation of Johnson's "Big Road Blues" is also noted as the only known cover version of the song, even though it was a standard among Delta blues musicians who associated with Johnson.
