= William Harris (musician) =

American songwriter

- Also known as: Alonso Boone, Bud Johnson, William "Big Foot" Harris
- Born: probably c. 1900 probably Glendora, Mississippi, U.S.
- Died: possibly 1930s
- Genres: Country blues
- Occupations: Musician; Singer-songwriter
- Instruments: Guitar; Vocals
- Years active: 1927 – early 1930s
- Labels: Gennett, Supertone, Champion, Conqueror

William Harris (probably c. 1900 - possibly 1930s) was an American country blues guitarist, singer, and songwriter. He recorded sixteen songs between 1927 and 1928, of which fourteen were released on record. AllMusic noted that Harris was "a fine second-level blues and folksong performer". His best known works are "Kansas City Blues," "Early Mornin' Blues," "Hot Time Blues" and "Bullfrog Blues".

Details of Harris's life outside of his brief recording career are minimal.

== Life and career ==
Harris's date and place of birth are unknown, but there is a general consensus among blues historians that he probably originated in the Mississippi Delta area. He was one of the earliest "discoveries" made by the white businessman H. C. Speir, who ran a music and mercantile store on Farish Street, in a black neighborhood of Jackson, Mississippi. It is thought that around this time, Harris was a performer with a traveling medicine show, probably with F. S. Wolcott's Rabbit Foot Minstrels. The lyrical content of some of his recorded work suggests that Harris spent some of his formative years in Alabama.

What is known is that he recorded sixteen tracks in two separate sessions in 1927 and 1928 for Gennett Records. His first recording session took place in Birmingham, Alabama, on July 18, 1927. His second and final session occurred over three days in October 1928, in Richmond, Indiana, in which he recorded a cover version of Jim Jackson's big-selling track "Kansas City Blues". Jackson was also a singer in a medicine show, and it is presumed that the two men knew each other from that time. Another of Harris's recordings, "Hot Time Blues", was based on an earlier song, "Take Me Back", which had been recorded by two other regulars on the medicine circuit, Frank Stokes and Papa Charlie Jackson. Harris accompanied himself on guitar, which he mainly treated as a rhythm instrument, unlike those who followed him in the Delta blues tradition. To add to the confusion, some of the Gennett recordings were later reissued on the subsidiary labels Champion, Supertone, and Conqueror, with the tracks "Electric Chair Blues" and "Kansas City Blues" credited to Alonso Boone, and two other 10-inch 78-rpm shellac singles were credited to Bud Johnson.

Nothing is known of Harris's life after his recording career ended.

Most of Harris's known work has been compiled on a CD album released by Document Records, which also contains 12 tracks recorded by Buddy Boy Hawkins.

== Songs ==
- "Bad Treated Blues" (released on Gennett 6752)
- "Bullfrog Blues"+ (Gennett 6661, Champion 15614, Conqueror 7264)
- "Early Mornin' Blues"+ (Gennett 6693, Champion 15675, Conqueror 7264)
- "Electric Chair Blues (Jefferson County Blues)"+ (Gennett 6752, Supertone 9428)
- "Gonna Get Me a Woman That I Calls My Own" (Gennett 6677)
- "Hot Time Blues"+ (Gennett 6707, Champion 15675)
- "I'm a Roving Gambler" (Gennett 6737)
- "I'm Leavin' Town (But I Sho' Don't Wanna Go)"+ (Gennett 6306)
- "I Was Born in the Country, Raised in Town" (Gennett 6737)
- "Kansas City Blues"+ (Gennett 6707, Supertone 9428)
- "Keep Your Man Out of Birmingham"+ (Gennett 6661)
- "Kitchen Range Blues"+ (Gennett 6677, Champion 15614)
- "Leavin' Here Blues"+ (Gennett 6693)
- "Nothing Right Blues (Bearing in Mind)" (Gennett 6904)
- "Police and High Sheriff Come Ridin' Down" (Gennett 6306)
- "T.B. Blues" (not issued)

note: (+) only these 9 songs are included on the Complete Recorded Works in Chronological Order (1927–1929) CD.

== Selected compilation album ==
Year	Title	Record label
1991	Complete Recorded Works in Chronological Order (1927–1929)	Document Records DOCD-5035

== See also ==
- List of country blues musicians
