= Vocalion Records =

American record label

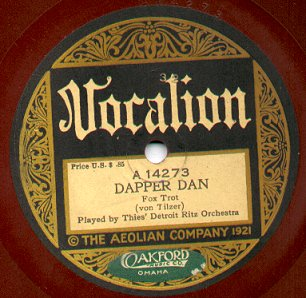
- 1921 Vocalion label
- Parent company: MCA Records, PolyGram, Universal Music
- Founded: 1916
- Founder: Aeolian Piano Company
- Distributors: MCA Inc., Geffen Records, Universal Music
- Genre: Jazz
- Country of origin: US, UK

Vocalion Records is an American record label, originally founded by the Aeolian Company, a piano and organ manufacturer before being bought out by Brunswick in 1924.

== History ==
The label was founded in 1916 by the Aeolian Company, a maker of pianos and organs, as Aeolian-Vocalion; the company also sold phonographs under the Vocalion name. "Aeolian" was later dropped from the label's name. In late 1924, the label was acquired by Brunswick Records. During the 1920s, Vocalion also began the 1000 race series, records recorded by and marketed to African Americans. Jim Jackson recorded "Jim Jackson's Kansas City Blues" for Vocalion in 1927. It sold exceptionally well, and the song became a blues standard for musicians from Memphis and Mississippi. The label issued Robert Johnson's "Cross Road Blues"

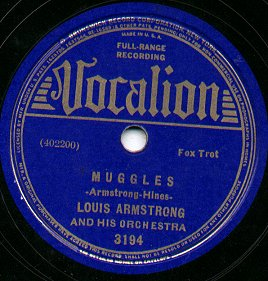
Vocalion record by Louis Armstrong

Vocalion was one of the most popular labels in the late 1930s. However, Columbia Broadcasting System (CBS) bought American Record Corporation (which operated the Vocalion label) in 1938 and, in July 1940, they discontinued Vocalion, replacing it with the Okeh label.

The City of London Phonograph and Gramophone Society (CLPGS) has published a comprehensive database of British and Australian Vocalion records, including Broadcast, World Records and other labels used by the company in the 1920s and 1930s.

=== Mid-20th century resurrection ===
The name Vocalion was resurrected in the late 1950s by American Decca as a budget label for back-catalog reissues. This incarnation of Vocalion ceased operations in 1973; however, its replacement as MCA's budget imprint, Coral Records, kept many Vocalion titles in print. In 1975, MCA reissued five albums on the Vocalion label.
