= Charley Patton =

American Delta blues musician (1891–1934)

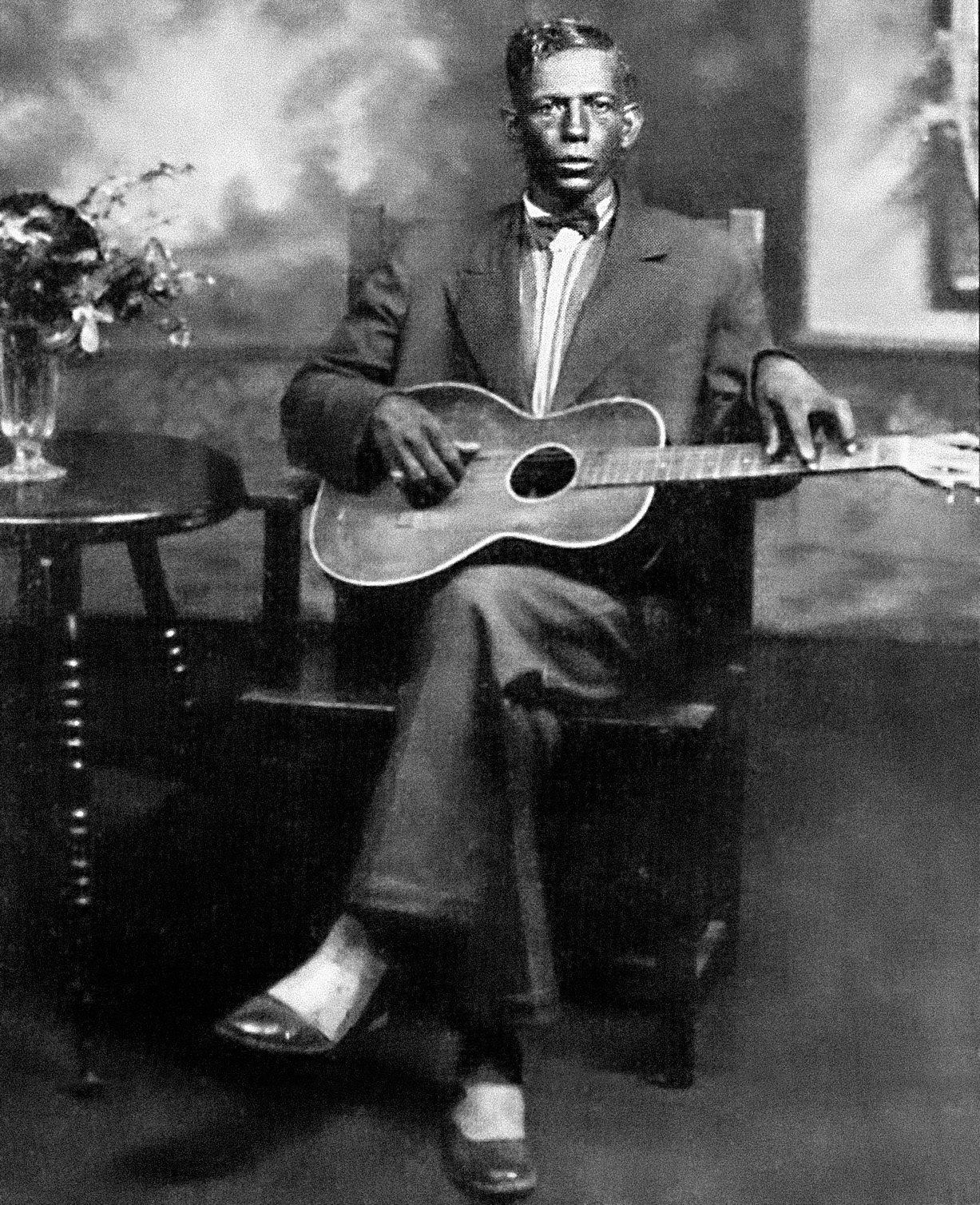
- Publicity photo for Paramount Records, the only confirmed extant photograph of Patton, c. 1929

Background information
- Also known as: The Masked Marvel; Elder J. J. Hadley
- Born: c. April 1891; Hinds County, Mississippi, U.S.
- Died: April 28, 1934 (aged 43) Heathman Plantation, Mississippi, U.S.
- Genres: Delta blues; country blues; gospel blues
- Occupations: Musician; songwriter
- Instruments: Guitar; vocals; slide guitar
- Years active: 1916–1934
- Labels: Paramount; Vocalion

Charlie Patton (April 1891 (probable) – April 28, 1934), more often spelled Charley Patton, was an American Delta blues musician and songwriter. Considered by many to be the "Father of the Delta Blues", he created an enduring body of American music and inspired most Delta blues musicians. The musicologist Robert Palmer considered him one of the most important American musicians of the twentieth century.

Patton (who was well educated by the standards of his time) spelled his name Charlie, but many sources, including record labels and his gravestone, use the spelling Charley.

== Biography ==
Patton was born in Hinds County, Mississippi, near the town of Edwards and lived most of his life in Sunflower County, in the Mississippi Delta. Most sources say he was born in April 1891, but the years 1881, 1885, and 1887 have also been suggested. Patton's parentage and race also are uncertain. His parents were Bill and Annie Patton, but locally he was regarded as having been fathered by former slave Henderson Chatmon. Several of Chatmon's children became popular Delta musicians, as solo performers and as members of groups including the Mississippi Sheiks. Biographer John Fahey described Patton as having "light skin and Caucasian features."

Patton was considered African-American, but because of his light complexion there has been much speculation about his ancestry over the years. One theory endorsed by blues musician Howlin' Wolf was that Patton was Mexican or Cherokee. It is generally agreed that Patton was of Black, White, and Native heritage. Some believe he had a Cherokee grandmother; however, it is also widely asserted by historians that he was between one-quarter and one-half Choctaw. In 1897, his family moved 100 miles (160 km) north to the 10,000-acre (40 km^{2}) Dockery Plantation, a cotton farm and sawmill near Ruleville, Mississippi. There, Patton developed his musical style, influenced by Henry Sloan, who had a new, unusual style of playing music, which is now considered an early form of the blues. Patton performed at Dockery and nearby plantations and began an association with Willie Brown. Tommy Johnson, Fiddlin' Joe Martin, Robert Johnson, and Chester Burnett (who later became famous in Chicago as Howlin' Wolf) also lived and performed in the area. Patton served as a mentor to these younger performers.

Robert Palmer described Patton as a "jack-of all-trades bluesman", who played "deep blues, white hillbilly songs, nineteenth-century ballads, and other varieties of black and white country dance music with equal facility". He was popular across the southern United States and performed annually in Chicago; in 1934, he performed in New York City. Unlike most blues musicians of his time who were often itinerant performers, Patton played scheduled engagements at plantations and taverns. He gained popularity for his showmanship, sometimes playing with his guitar down on his knees, behind his head, or behind his back.

Patton was about 5 feet 5 inches tall (1.65m), but his gravelly voice was reputed to have been loud enough to carry 500 yards without amplification; a singing style which particularly influenced Howlin' Wolf (even though Jimmie Rodgers, the "singing brakeman", has to be cited there primarily). Patton settled in Holly Ridge, Mississippi, with his common-law wife and recording partner, Bertha Lee, in 1933. His relationship with Bertha Lee was a turbulent one. In early 1934, both of them were incarcerated in a Belzoni, Mississippi jailhouse after a particularly harsh fight. W. R. Calaway from Vocalion Records bailed them out of jail and escorted them to New York City, for what would be Patton's final recording sessions (on January 30 and February 1). They later returned to Holly Ridge and Lee was with Patton in his final days.

Patton died on the Heathman-Dedham plantation, near Indianola on April 28, 1934. He is buried in Holly Ridge (both towns are in Sunflower County). His death certificate says that he died of a mitral valve disorder. The death certificate does not mention Bertha Lee; the only informant listed is one Willie Calvin. Patton's death was not reported in the newspapers. A memorial headstone was erected on his grave (the location of which was identified by the cemetery caretaker, C. Howard, who claimed to have been present at the burial), paid for by musician John Fogerty through the Mount Zion Memorial Fund in July 1990. The spelling of Patton's name was dictated by Jim O'Neal, who composed the epitaph.

== Recognitions ==
Screamin' and Hollerin' the Blues: The Worlds of Charley Patton, a boxed set collecting Patton's recorded works, was released in 2001. It also features recordings by many of his friends and associates. The set won three Grammy Awards in 2003, for Best Historical Album, Best Boxed or Special Limited Edition Package, and Best Album Notes. Another collection of Patton recordings, The Definitive Charley Patton, was released by Catfish Records in 2001.

Patton's song "Pony Blues" (1929) was included by the National Recording Preservation Board in the National Recording Registry of the Library of Congress in 2006. The board annually selects recordings that are "culturally, historically, or aesthetically significant."

In 2017, Patton's story was told in the award-winning documentary series American Epic. The film featured unseen film footage of Patton's contemporaries and radically improved restorations of his 1920s and 1930s recordings. Director Bernard MacMahon observed that "we had a strong feeling that the music of Patton and his peers reflected the local geography, and I was struck by the extent to which that belief was already shared by people who were living in the Delta back then, when it was a center of musical innovation. Listening to interviews with H. C. Speir, who owned a furniture store in Jackson, Mississippi in the 1920s and was responsible for virtually all the recordings of early Delta blues, he clearly linked the music to its surroundings." Patton's story was profiled in the accompanying book, American Epic: The First Time America Heard Itself.

In May, 2021, the Rock and Roll Hall of Fame posthumously inducted Patton into the 2021 class as an Early Influence.

=== Historical marker ===
The Mississippi Blues Trail placed its first historical marker at the cemetery where Patton's grave is in Holly Ridge, Mississippi, in recognition of his legendary status as a bluesman and his importance in the development of the blues in Mississippi. It placed another historic marker at the site where the Peavine Railroad intersects Highway 446 in Boyle, Mississippi, designating it as a second site related to Patton on the Mississippi Blues Trail. The marker commemorates the lyrics of Patton's "Peavine Blues", which refer to the branch of the Yazoo and Mississippi Valley Railroad which ran south from Dockery Plantation to Boyle. The marker notes that riding on the railroad was a common theme of blues songs and was seen as a metaphor for travel and escape.

== Discography ==
- 1929 - Complete Recorded Works In Chronological Order Volume 1 (Document Recs, 1990)
- 1929 - Complete Recorded Works In Chronological Order Volume 2 (Document Recs,1990)
- 1929-34 - Complete Recorded Works In Chronological Order Volume 3 (Document Recs, 1990)
- 1929-34 - Complete Recording 1929-34 (5xcd) (JSP, 2002) an alternative with Patton second guitar and others

Recording date	Recording location	Matrix	Song	Paramount Issue #	Release date
June 14, 1929	Richmond, Indiana	G15216	"Pony Blues"	12792-A	1929
June 14, 1929	Richmond	G15211	"Mississippi Boweavil Blues"	12805-B	1929
June 14, 1929	Richmond	G15214	"Screamin' and Hollerin' the Blues"	12805-A	1929
June 14, 1929	Richmond	G15215	"Down the Dirt Road Blues"	12854-A	1929
June 14, 1929	Richmond	G15217	"Banty Rooster Blues"	12792-B	1929
June 14, 1929	Richmond	G15221	"Pea Vine Blues"	12877-A	1929
June 14, 1929	Richmond	G15220	"It Won't Be Long"	12854-B	1929
June 14, 1929	Richmond	G15222	"Tom Rushen Blues"	12877-B	1929
June 14, 1929	Richmond	G15223	"A Spoonful Blues"	12869-B	1929
June 14, 1929	Richmond	G15224	"Shake It and Break It (But Don't Let It Fall Mama)"	12869-A	1929
June 14, 1929	Richmond	G15225	"Prayer of Death, Part 1"	12799-A	1929
June 14, 1929	Richmond	G15225A	"Prayer of Death, Part 2"	12799-B	1929
June 14, 1929	Richmond	G15226	"Lord, I'm Discouraged"	12883-A	1929
June 14, 1929	Richmond	G15227	"I'm Going Home"	12883-B	1929
November 1929	Grafton, Wisconsin	L0038=1	"Elder Green Blues" ≠	12972-A	1929
November 1929	Grafton	L0041	"Mean Black Cat Blues"	12943-A	1929
November 1929	Grafton	L0050	"Heart Like Railroad Steel"	12953-B	1929
November 1929	Grafton	L0047	"Hammer Blues"	12998-A	1929
November 1929	Grafton	L0051	"Some Happy Day"	13031-A	1930
November 1929	Grafton	L0049	"When Your Way Gets Dark"	12998-B	1929
November 1929	Grafton	L0040	"Devil Sent the Rain" ≠	13040-B	1929
November 1929	Grafton	L0052	"You're Gonna Need Somebody When You Die"	13031-B	1930
November 1929	Grafton	L0039	"Circle Round the Moon" ≠	13040-A	1930
November 1929	Grafton	L0048	"Magnolia Blues"	12943-B	1929
November 1929	Grafton	L0043	"Some Of These Days, I'll Be Gone"	13110-B	1930
December 1929	Grafton	L0077	"Mean Black Moan" ≠	12953-A	1929
December 1929	Grafton	L0044=3	"Green River Blues"	12972-A	1929
December 1929	Grafton	L0061	"Jesus Is a Dying Bed Maker" ≠	12986-A	1929
December 1929	Grafton	L0037=1	"Going Move to Alabama" ≠	13014-B	1930
December 1929	Grafton	L0059	"High Water Everywhere, Part 1"	12909-A	1929
December 1929	Grafton	L0060	"High Water Everywhere, Part 2"	12909-B	1929
December 1929	Grafton	L0062=2	"I Shall Not Be Moved"	12986-B	1929
December 1929	Grafton	L0064=1	"Runnin' Wild Blues" ≠	12924-B	1929
December 1929	Grafton	L0063=2	"Rattlesnake Blues" ≠	12924-A	1929
December 1929	Grafton	L0057	"Jim Lee Blues, Part 1"	13080-A	1930
December 1929	Grafton	L0058	"Jim Lee Blues, Part 2"	13133-B	1930
December 1929	Grafton	L0042=1	"Frankie and Albert"	13110-A	1930
December 1929	Grafton	L0067	"Joe Kirby" ≠	13133-A	1930
May 28, 1930	Grafton	L0432=1	"Moon Going Down" ^{†}	13014-A	1930
May 28, 1930	Grafton	L0433	"Bird Nest Bound" ^{†}	13070-A	1930
May 28, 1930	Grafton	L0431	"Some Summer Day" ^{†}	13080-B	1930
May 28, 1930	Grafton	L0429	"Dry Well Blues" ^{†}	13070-B	1930

≠ Vocals and guitar by Patton with Henry "Son" Sims on fiddle. (Only one copy of Paramount 13040 is now thought to exist and that is in a very poor condition).

^{†} Willie Brown on accompanying guitar

1929; Henry "Son" Sims (vocals), Patton accompanying on guitar

Recording date	Recording location	Matrix	Song	Paramount Issue #	Release date
November 1929	Grafton	L0046	"Come Back Corrinna"	12912-A	1929
November 1929	Grafton	L0045	"Farrell Blues"	12912-B	1929
December 1929	Grafton	L0066	"Be True, Be True Blues"	12940-A	1929
December 1929	Grafton	L0065	"Tell Me Man Blues"	12940-B	1929

=== Vocalion recordings ===
Recording date	Recording location	Matrix	Song	Vocalion Issue #	Release date
January 30, 1934	New York City	14723=1	"Jersey Bull Blues"	02782-A	1934
January 30, 1934	New York City	14725=2	"High Sheriff Blues"	02680-A	1934
January 30, 1934	New York City	14727=1	"Stone Pony Blues"	02680-B	1934
January 31, 1934	New York City	14739=1	"34 Blues"	02651-B	1934
January 31, 1934	New York City	14746	"Love My Stuff"	02782-B	1934
January 31, 1934	New York City	14747	"Revenue Man Blues"	02931-A	1934
February 1, 1934	New York City	14749	"Oh Death" ‡	02904-A	1934
February 1, 1934	New York City	14749	"Troubled 'Bout My Mother" ‡	02904-B	1934
February 1, 1934	New York City	14757	"Poor Me"	02651-A	1934
February 1, 1934	New York City	14758	"Hang It On the Wall"	02931-B	1934

‡ Vocal duet with Bertha Lee

1934; Bertha Lee (vocals), Patton accompanying guitar

Recording date	Recording location	Matrix	Song	Vocalion Issue #	Release date
January 31, 1934	New York City	14735=1	"Yellow Bee"	02650-A	1934
January 31, 1934	New York City	14736=1	"Mind Reader Blues"	02650-B	1934

== Relevant literature ==
- Sacré, Robert, ed. Charley Patton: Voice of the Mississippi Delta. 2018. Jackson: University Press of Mississippi
