= Băshovia =

Compilation album by Robbie Basho
- Released: August 14, 2001
- Recorded: 1967 – 1968
- Genre: American Primitivism
- Length: 72:45
- Label: Takoma
- Producer: Bill Belmont

Robbie Basho chronology
Guitar Soli (1996)	Băshovia (2001)	Bonn ist Supreme (2008)

Professional ratings
Review scores
Source	Rating
Allmusic	4/5 stars

Băshovia is a compilation album by composer and guitarist Robbie Basho, released on August 14, 2001 by Takoma Records. The tracks comprising the album were remastered by Joe Tarantino at Fantasy Studios in Berkeley.

== Track listing ==
All music is composed by Robbie Basho.

No.	Title	From the album (date)	Length
1.	"The Falconer's Arm"	The Falconer's Arm I (1967)	9:50
2.	"Lost Lagoon Suite"	The Falconer's Arm I (1967)	12:14
3.	"Pavan Hindustan"	The Falconer's Arm I (1967)	6:16
4.	"Song of the Snowy Ranges"	The Falconer's Arm II (1967)	8:32
5.	"Pasha"	The Falconer's Arm II (1967)	9:05
6.	"A North American Raga (The Plumstar)"	Song of the Stallion (1971)	11:31
7.	"Roses and Snow"	Song of the Stallion (1971)	7:53
8.	"The Hajj"	Song of the Stallion (1971)	5:18
9.	"Khatum"	Song of the Stallion (1971)	2:06

== Personnel ==
Adapted from the Băshovia liner notes.

- Robbie Basho – acoustic guitar, acoustic twelve-string guitar, vocals
- Bill Belmont – production
- Paul Kagan – photography
- Linda Kalin – design
- Joe Tarantino – remastering

== Release history ==
Region	Date	Label	Format	Catalog
United States	2001	Takoma	CD	8913
