= Guitar Soli =

Compilation album by Robbie Basho
- Released: July 19, 1996
- Recorded: 1965 – February 9, 1966
- Genre: American primitivism
- Length: 78:43
- Label: Takoma
- Producer: Bill Belmont

Robbie Basho chronology
Twilight Peaks (1984)	Guitar Soli (1996)	Băshovia (2001)

Professional ratings
Review scores
Source	Rating
AllMusic	4.5/5 stars

Guitar Soli is a compilation album by composer and guitarist Robbie Basho, released on July 19, 1996, by Takoma Records. It is composed of material from his first three albums, recorded for Takoma in the mid-1960s.

Tracks 1 – 3 and 7 were recorded in 1965 and previously released on Seal of the Blue Lotus/ Guitar Soli (Takoma 1005). Tracks 4 – 6, 9 – 11 were recorded February 12 and 19, 1965 and released on The Grail and the Lotus, (Takoma 1007). Track 8 was recorded February 9, 1966 and released on Basho Sings, Volume 3, (Takoma 1012).

The tracks of this album were remastered by Joe Tarantino at Fantasy Studios in Berkeley.

== Track listing ==
All music is composed by Robbie Basho.

No.	Title	From the album (date)	Length
1.	"Seal of the Blue Lotus"	The Seal of the Blue Lotus (1965)	7:37
2.	"Mountain Man's Farewell"	The Seal of the Blue Lotus (1965)	8:39
3.	"Dravidian Sunday"	The Seal of the Blue Lotus (1965)	6:35
4.	"The Grail and the Lotus"	The Grail & the Lotus (1966)	6:02
5.	"The Dharma Prince"	The Grail & the Lotus (1966)	10:06
6.	"Oriental Love Song"	The Grail & the Lotus (1966)	5:57
7.	"Sansara in Sweetness After Sandstorm"	The Seal of the Blue Lotus (1965)	6:07
8.	"Salangadou"	Basho Sings (1967)	4:15
9.	"The Golden Shamrock"	The Grail & the Lotus (1966)	8:43
10.	"Street Dakini"	The Grail & the Lotus (1966)	6:31
11.	"Chung Mei – The Chinese Orchid"	The Grail & the Lotus (1966)	8:11

== Personnel ==
Adapted from the Guitar Soli liner notes.

- Robbie Basho – acoustic guitar, acoustic twelve-string guitar, vocals
- Bill Belmont – production
- Paul Kagan – photography
- Linda Kalin – design
- Joe Tarantino – remastering

== Release history ==
Region	Date	Label	Format	Catalog
United States	1996	Takoma	CD	8902
