= Harry Taussig =

American academic, artist, and guitarist

- Born: Harry Arthur Taussig; March 31, 1941 (age 85)
- Origin: Los Angeles
- Genres: American primitive guitar, folk
- Occupation: Professor
- Instrument: Guitar
- Years active: 1960-67; 2012–present
- Labels: Takoma Records, Tompkins Square

Harry Arthur Taussig (alternately appearing as Harry Taussig, Arthur Taussig, or H. Arthur Taussig, born March 31, 1941) is an American physicist, biochemist, collage artist, photographer, film analyst, author, academic, and fingerstyle guitarist.

== Early life and musical career ==
Taussig was born and raised in Los Angeles and attended school in Eagle Rock, California. In 1963, he graduated with a BS in physics from the University of California, Berkeley, where he also studied anthropology and music history. Inspired by blues instrumentalist Elizabeth Cotten and Wolfgang Amadeus Mozart, Taussig took up banjo and 12-string guitar and performed on radio station KPFK’s Midnight Special folk music program.

In 1964, Taussig took a job as a physicist for Ford-Aeronutronics Corporation in Orange County and began studying art and photography with John Upton at Orange Coast College. In 1965, he recorded his first solo album, Fate is Only Once, under the name Harry Taussig. Played in a single 45-minute take, the record is partially improvised and, according to Taussig, full of mistakes. Issued on a private label, few copies of the original record existed, making it a collector's item for fans of what would later be called American primitive and fingerstyle guitar.

The following year Taussig recorded two songs for the compilation Contemporary Guitar: Spring '67 for John Fahey's Takoma label. The album featured similar American primitive guitarists, including Fahey, Max Ochs, Robbie Basho and Bukka White. Taussig's only live performances during this period were informal sessions for friends. He taught guitar for some years and wrote several books on guitar and autoharp instruction for Oak Publications before retiring from music altogether.

== Art, photography and film career ==
Taussig spent some time working in the defense industry, but soon left due to discontent with the military-industrial complex. He entered UCLA to continue his studies both at the Brain Research Institute, and also in photography with Robert Heinecken and Robert Fichter. In summers, he worked with photographers John Upton, Minor White, Ansel Adams, Paul Caponigro, Oliver Gagliani, and others. Taussig received his master's degree in biochemistry in 1969 followed by a doctorate in biophysics in 1971. He wrote his dissertation on the circular dichroism of electrical signals through various nucleic acids. That same year, Oak Publications began to release more of Taussig's books on guitar instruction.

While finishing his scientific studies, Taussig was also beginning to exhibit his photography internationally, as well as work in other visual mediums, including collage and film studies, which he taught at Orange Coast College under the name H. Arthur Taussig. He gradually became well known as a film analyst, curating film for the Orange County Museum and publishing the 1997 book Film Values/Family Values: A Parents' Guide. As a visual artist, Taussig has produced a series of illuminated books of classic works including Dante’s The Divine Comedy, James Joyce’s Ulysses, Shakespeare’s Hamlet, among others. Taussig also creates collages based on Jungian archetypes and has published a series of his collages as a deck of tarot cards.

Taussig's artwork has been exhibited at the Art Institute of Chicago, Denver Museum of Art, Fogg Art Museum of Harvard University, Metropolitan Museum of Art in New York City, San Francisco Museum of Modern Art, Portland Art Museum, Seattle Art Museum, New Orleans Museum of Art, and many others. In 1982, he received the National Endowment of the Arts Visual Artist's Grant.

== Musical resurgence ==
In 2006 the label Tompkins Square Records reissued Fate is Only Once—the only album Taussig had recorded to date—41 years after its original release. In 2012 Taussig put together a second album—Fate is Only Twice—at home on a laptop, affording him the luxury of recording the multiple takes he was denied by the 1965 recording process. In 2013 he made his public performance debut at the South by Southwest Festival in Austin, Texas where Wired Magazine' listed him as one of the top 50 performances.

In 2014 Tompkins Square released Taussig's third album, The Diamond of Lost Alphabets, and in 2016 his fourth album, Too Late to Die Young, in which the guitarist explored polyrhythms and unconventional time signatures. Tompkins Square also commissioned Brooklyn-based experimental musician Kid Millions to remix some of Taussig's original material, and in June 2016 released Beyond The Confession: Kid Millions Reworks Harry Taussig. With engineer Matthew Cullen, Millions overdubbed guitars, drums and organs onto selected tracks from Taussig's first three albums, melding Taussig's compositions into a new soundscape.

In 2017, to commemorate the 50th anniversary of Takoma Records’ Contemporary Guitar: Spring '67 album, Tompkins Square reunited Taussig with fellow fingerstylist Max Ochs for the release of the album Remembrance of Things Past featuring five songs by Taussig and three by Ochs. The two musicians also made live appearances to support the release.

== Recordings ==
- Fate is Only Once (privately issued, 1965)
- Two tracks on the compilation Contemporary Guitar (Takoma Records, 1967)
- Fate is Only Twice (Tompkins Square Records, 2012)
- The Diamond of Lost Alphabets (Tompkins Square Records, 2014)
- Too Late to Die Young (Tompkins Square Records, April 2016)
- Beyond The Confession: Kid Millions Reworks Harry Taussig (Tompkins Square, June 2016)
- Remembrance of Things Past, split LP with Max Ochs (Tompkins Square Records, April 2017)

== Books ==
- Folk Style Autoharp (Oak Publications, 1967)
- Instrumental Techniques of American Folk Guitar (Oak Publications, 1968)
- Teach Yourself Guitar (Oak Publications, 1971)
- Folk-Style Guitar (Oak Publications, 1973)
- Advanced Guitar (Oak Publications, 1975)
- Photography: An Advanced Hands-on Approach, Vol. 1: Black and White (Kendall/Hunt Publishing, 1989)
- Film Values/Family Values: A Parents' Guide (ATW Publications, 1997)
- The Wizard of Oz: Decoding and Decyphering an Archetypal Masterpiece (ATW Publications, 1999)
