= Tompkins Square Records =

Record label

- Founded: 2005
- Founder: Josh Rosenthal
- Distributor(s): Fontana Distribution
- Genre: Jazz, American primitive, gospel, blues, country
- Country of origin: U.S.
- Location: San Francisco, California
- Official website: tompkinssquare.com

Tompkins Square Records is an independent record label producing new and archival releases of gospel, blues, jazz, and country music.

== History ==
In 2005, Josh Rosenthal launched Tompkins Square Records in New York City after working 15 years in a variety of positions at Sony Music. Tompkins Square moved to San Francisco in 2011. Rosenthal runs the label on his own with help from an art director and publishing company.

== Albums ==
Tompkins Square's first album was Imaginational Anthem, an anthology of music by fingerstyle guitarists including Jack Rose, Sandy Bull, John Fahey, Max Ochs, and Kaki King. The series has grown to seven volumes.

Tompkins Square issued a previously unreleased concert recording by Tim Buckley, Live at the Folklore Center, NYC — March 6, 1967.

Tompkins Square has released several comprehensive gospel music compilations, including 2009's Fire In My Bones: Raw & Rare & Other-Worldly African American Gospel (1944–2007) and This May Be My Last Time Singing: Raw African-American Gospel On 45RPM (1957–1982).

Rosenthal brought Charlie Louvin in to record a series of albums, introducing Louvin to a new generation of listeners.

Tompkins Square released Remembering Mountains: Unheard Songs of Karen Dalton, an album of songs written by Dalton and performed by artists such as Lucinda Williams, Sharon Van Etten, Tara Jane O'Neil, and Diane Cluck.

Tompkins Square released several 78 rpm discs for Record Store Day. Artists involved included Luther Dickinson, Tyler Ramsey, and Ralph Stanley.

In 2015, Rosenthal wrote and published the book The Record Store of the Mind, a memoir about being a record collector and owning a record company.

== Roster ==
- A Broken Consort
- Aberdeen City
- Amédé Ardoin
- Tom Armstrong
- Teodross Avery
- Daniel Bachman
- Duck Baker
- Brad Barr
- Robbie Basho
- William C. Beeley
- Don Bikoff
- James Blackshaw
- Ran Blake
- Muireann Bradley
- Bob Brown
- Tim Buckley
- Sam Burton
- Joe Bussard
- Michael Chapman
- Richard Crandell
- Nick Jonah Davis
- Smoke Dawson
- Luther Dickinson
- Rick Deitrick
- James Elkington / Nathan Salsburg
- The Entourage Music and Theater Ensemble
- Frank Fairfield
- Mark Fosson
- Ruthann Friedman
- Charles Gayle
- Alice Gerrard
- Ben Hall
- Elsa Hewitt
- Roscoe Holcomb
- Lena Hughes
- John Hulburt
- Michael Hurley
- Bessie Jones with the Georgia Sea Island Singers
- Calvin Keys
- Josh Kimbrough
- Wall Matthews
- Suni McGrath
- Kid Millions
- Bobby Lee
- Philip Lewin
- Mason Lindahl
- Giuseppi Logan
- Charlie Louvin
- Bill MacKay
- Harvey Mandel
- Daniel Mandrychenko
- Suni Mcgrath
- Shawn David Mcmillen
- Dave Miller
- Polk Miller
- Spencer Moore
- Dorothy Moskowitz
- Kinloch Nelson
- Bern Nix
- Max Ochs
- Richard Osborn
- Charlie Poole and the Highlanders
- Russell Potter
- Brigid Mae Power
- Prefab Sprout
- Tyler Ramsey
- Gwenifer Raymond
- Red Fox Chasers
- Ben Reynolds
- Bola Sete
- John Lee Shannon
- Sonny Clark Trio
- Sean Smith
- Powell St. John
- Ralph Stanley
- Harry Taussig
- Michael Taylor / Hiss Golden Messenger
- William Tyler
- Dino Valente
- Terry Waldo
- Mal Waldron
- Peter Walker
- Ryley Walker
- Roland White
- Bill Wilson

== See also ==
- List of record labels
