= Peter Walker (guitarist) =

- Born: 1938 (age 87–88); Boston, Massachusetts, United States
- Genres: Folk
- Instrument: Guitar
- Years active: 1959–present
- Labels: Third Man, Tompkins Square

Peter Walker (born 1938) is an American folk guitarist, known for his skillful performances that blend Indian classical and Spanish flamenco music traditions. He gained recognition primarily for his recorded work during the late 1960s. In recent years, his reputation has seen a resurgence among younger American and European outsider folk artists. He is now regarded as a prominent figure in the company of established American finger-pickers such as Sandy Bull, John Fahey, Robbie Basho and Leo Kottke. This renewed recognition has provided him with new opportunities for touring and recording.

== Early life and career ==
Walker was born in Boston, Massachusetts into a musical family. His father played guitar and mandolin, and his mother was a concert pianist who played in the first all-women's orchestra in the US.

He began to play the guitar and harmonica from an early age. In 1952, at age 14, he left home, hitchhiking throughout the US from Maine to Florida and across the country from coast to coast. After a stint in the US Army in 1960, he founded the Cambridge Folklore Center in Harvard Square. From his base in Cambridge, he continued to travel extensively for five years, doing musical research in Mexico, North Africa, Algeria, Morocco, and Spain, often comparing notes with his friend and peer Sandy Bull.

He committed himself to touring and public performance from 1965 onward, becoming a fixture of the Greenwich Village folk scene of the mid-60s (during which period he became particularly close to Sandy Bull, Karen Dalton, Monty Dunn, Bruce Langhorne, Bob Gibson, Tim Hardin, and Fred Neil).

Earlier in the 60s, Walker's attendance at a Ravi Shankar performance in San Francisco saw him embrace extended periods of study of Raga under both Shankar and Ali Akbar Khan. Through mutual Boston associates, Walker also developed a strong friendship with LSD pioneer Timothy Leary, and was "Musical Director" for Dr. Leary's "Psychedelic Celebrations".

In 1966, Walker's debut LP Rainy Day Raga was released by Vanguard Records, followed by the release of Second Poem in 1968. Walker diverted his attention away from public performance and toward family life at the start of the 1970s. However, he maintained a commitment to the study of his instrument, focusing particularly on flamenco. In 2000, he returned to Spain and made several trips each year, living in the Calo Gipsy communities, studying in Granada, and playing lead guitar at Casa Anselma in Seville. In 2007 Walker was coaxed out of this semi-retirement by Joshua Rosenthal of Tompkins Square Records, for whom he recorded four new pieces to be set alongside musical tributes from younger admirers including Jack Rose, James Blackshaw, Steffen Basho-Junghans, and Sonic Youth's Thurston Moore on the 2008 collection A Raga for Peter Walker. A full album of new material, Echo of My Soul, was released by Tompkins Square later that same year. In 2009 Birdman Records released "Spanish Guitar" and in 2013 Delmore Recording Society released "Has Anybody Seen Our Freedoms?". In 2015 3rd Man recordings released "Peter Walker Live at 3rd Man."

These releases were supported by extensive touring and live performance, sparking a renewed level of interest which culminated in a recorded session for Stuart Maconie, on BBC 6 Music, and an extended interview on BBC Radio 4's flagship early morning current affairs show The Today Programme.

In 2014, Walker released three books on Amazon: Karen Dalton Songs Poems and Writings, a collection of material written by his friend Karen Dalton; Tune Up Drop In, a guitar teaching book; and Road to Marscota, a fictional story of the early 60s.

== Discography ==
- Rainy Day Raga (Vanguard, 1966)
- "Second Poem to Karmela" or Gypsies Are Important (Vanguard, 1968)
- A Raga for Peter Walker (Tompkins Square, 2008)
- Echo of My Soul (Tompkins Square, 2008)
- Spanish Guitar (Birdman, 2009)
- Long Lost Tapes (Tompkins Square 2009)
- Has Anybody Seen Our Freedoms? (Delmore Recording Society, 2013)
- Spirit Callers (with Muruga Booker) (Musart Media, 2016)
