= The Grail & the Lotus =

Studio album by Robbie Basho
- Released: 1966
- Recorded: February 12–19, 1965
- Genre: American primitivism
- Length: 45:29
- Label: Takoma
- Producer: Ed Denson

Robbie Basho chronology
The Seal of the Blue Lotus (1965)	The Grail & the Lotus (1966)	Basho Sings (1967)

The Grail & the Lotus is the second studio album by composer and guitarist Robbie Basho, released in 1966 by Takoma Records. It was produced by Ed Denson.

== Release and reception ==
Professional ratings
Review scores
Source	Rating
AllMusic	4.5/5 stars
The Great Folk Discography	8/10

Richie Unterberger of AllMusic stated that The Grail & the Lotus is "a fine, innovative album".

Despite never being individually issued on compact disc, The Grail & the Lotus can be found in its entirety on the Guitar Soli compilation album.

== Track listing ==
All music is composed by Robbie Basho.

Side one
No.	Title	Length
1.	"The Grail and the Lotus"	6:02
2.	"The Dharma Prince"	10:06
3.	"Oriental Love Song"	5:57

Side two
No.	Title	Length
1.	"The Golden Shamrock"	8:43
2.	"Street Dakini"	6:31
3.	"Chung Mei – The Chinese Orchid"	8:10

== Personnel ==
Adapted from The Grail & the Lotus liner notes.

- Robbie Basho – steel-string acoustic guitar, vocals
- ED Denson – production
- Tom Weller – illustrations

== Release history ==
Region	Date	Label	Format	Catalog
United States	1966	Takoma	LP	C-1007
