= Blues Jumped the Rabbit =

"Blues Jumped the Rabbit" is a blues idiom first referenced by Empress of the Blues Bessie Smith in 1924 in her song "Rocking Chair Blues", which contained the lyrics:

Blues jumped the rabbit, running for a solid mile
Blues jumped the rabbit, running for a solid mile
The rabbit turned over, and cried like a natural child

Other early recorded examples of variations on this line include Monette Moore's 1924 cover of Smith's "Rocking Chair Blues", Blind Lemon Jefferson's 1926 song "Rabbit Foot Blues", Jimmie Noone And His New Orleans Band's 1927 song "The Blues Jumped A Rabbit", and The Allen Brothers (American duo) song "Shanghai Rooster Blues," recorded for RCA Victor Company, Inc. in Memphis, Tennessee on June 5, 1930,

The song was recorded by Big Joe Turner in April, 1950 in New Orleans, Louisiana. Turner is backed by Dave Bartholomew's band, with Fats Domino on piano.

A different song with the same title is a track on the album Cotton Eyed Joe recorded by Karen Dalton in 1962. A slightly altered version called "Blues Chase up a Rabbit" was recorded by Judy Henske in 1964. Both versions contain variations of the lyrics:

wish I was a headlight
On some western train
I'd shine my light on
Cool Colorado rain

Another variation of these lyrics appeared in The Grateful Dead's version of traditional blues song "I Know You Rider" which they first performed in 1965.

Karen Dalton's "Blues Jumped the Rabbit" also contains the lyrics:

When the blues jump up a rabbit
Rabbit he'll run a mile
Poor little rabbit
Cries like a new born child

They also appear in Taj Mahal's song "Good Morning Miss Brown" on his 1968 album The Natch'l Blues.
