= The Seal of the Blue Lotus =

Studio album by Robbie Basho
- Released: 1965
- Recorded: 1965
- Genre: American primitivism
- Length: 45:33
- Label: Takoma
- Producer: Robbie Basho, ED Denson

Robbie Basho chronology
The Seal of the Blue Lotus (1965)	The Grail & the Lotus (1966)

The Seal of the Blue Lotus is the debut studio album of composer and guitarist Robbie Basho, released in 1965 by Takoma Records.

== Release and reception ==
Professional ratings
Review scores
Source	Rating
AllMusic	4/5 stars
The Great Folk Discography	7/10

Skip Jansen, of AllMusic, favorably compared Basho's Eastern-influenced musical approach to that of John Fahey and noted the influence of Ravi Shankar. Jansen concluded that it is "an essential document for folk guitar fans."

In 1996, Takoma Records issued The Seal of the Blue Lotus for the first time on Compact Disc, with an alternate cover. The album has again been re-issued by 4 Men With Beards on 180 gram vinyl

== Track listing ==
All music is composed by Robbie Basho.

Side one
No.	Title	Length
1.	"The Seal of the Blue Lotus"	7:40
2.	"Mountain Man's Farewell"	8:38
3.	"Dravidian Sunday"	6:36

Side two
No.	Title	Length
1.	"Bardo Blues"	7:27
2.	"Sansara in Sweetness After Sandstorm"	6:08
3.	"Black Lotus (Hymn to Fugen)"	9:04

== Personnel ==
Adapted from The Seal of the Blue Lotus liner notes.

- Robbie Basho – steel-string acoustic guitar, production, cover art
- ED Denson – production

== Release history ==
Region	Date	Label	Format	Catalog
United States	1965	Takoma	LP	C-1005
United Kingdom	1996	Takoma	CD	C-1005
United States	2012	4 Men With Beards	LP	4M223
