= 6- and 12-String Guitar =

Studio album by Leo Kottke
- Released: December 1969
- Recorded: Empire Photo-Sound, Minneapolis, MN
- Genre: American primitivism
- Length: 37:23
- Label: Takoma (C1024) (later as TAK 7024)

Leo Kottke chronology
12-String Blues (1969)	6- and 12-String Guitar (1969)	Circle Round The Sun (1970)

6- and 12-String Guitar is the second album by American guitarist Leo Kottke, originally released by John Fahey's Takoma Records in December 1969. It is popularly known as the Armadillo album in reference to the distinctive cover art (by Annie Elliott). Although Kottke has had a prolific career as a recording artist, 6- and 12-String Guitar remains his best-known album.

== History ==
The album showcases Kottke's early, hard-driving polyphonic finger-picking style (which eventually led to his developing tendinitis and having to change his playing approach). The album was recorded in one afternoon, in exactly the running order of the album. Most tracks were done in a single take; Kottke doesn't even pause when he audibly smacks the slide on the guitar neck on "The Sailor's Grave on the Prairie." In the liner notes to The Leo Kottke Anthology he states:

"We didn't know about sequencing, so the record is in the order it was recorded...The record took three-and-a-half hours to do, and all I had to do was sit down and play everything I ever knew."

The album contains performances on both 6- and 12-string acoustic guitars, some using a slide. Although Kottke has included vocals on other albums, this album is instrumental – the reason being, as Kottke explains in the liner notes, his voice "sounds like geese farts on a muggy day."

The album was a large inspiration for guitarist Michael Hedges, who would later tour with Kottke.

This album has been re-released as an SACD.

== Reception ==
Professional ratings
Review scores
Source	Rating
AllMusic	4.5/5 stars

AllMusic critic Richie Unterberger wrote of the album, "Kottke's brand of virtuosity, however, is more soothing and easy on the ear than Fahey's. It's far from sappy, though, the rich and resonant picking intimating some underlying restlessness, like peaceful open fields after a storm. Establishing much of the territory Kottke was to explore throughout his career, this release was also one of his most popular, eventually selling over 500,000 copies." Rolling Stone brought the album to a wider public with its review in 1970 by Carl Bauer, in which he wrote: "With all the shit that has been released recently, it was a distinct pleasure to come across this album... Kottke isn't a new addition to the Page-Beck school of grating, hypertensive guitarists, as if you were expecting that. He's an acoustic guitarist from Minneapolis whose music can invoke your most subliminal reflections or transmit you to the highest reaches of joy... anything in addition to his guitar would be superfluous."

== Track listing (with Kottke's notes) ==
All tracks are written by Leo Kottke, except where noted.

Side One
No.	Title	Length
1.	"The Driving of the Year Nail" (From an old Etruscan drawing of a sperm cell.)	1:54
2.	"The Last of the Arkansas Greyhounds" (A terror-filled escape on a bus from a man fired from Beaumont ranch.)	3:18
3.	"Ojo" ([shown as "The Ojo" on the label]—Ojo Caliente where the Zuni hid from Estaban, the Moor, and the Spaniards.)	2:14
4.	"Crow River Waltz" (A prayer for the demise of the canoe and the radar trap without which Federal prisons will have to be rebuilt to accommodate prepubescence.)	3:20
5.	"The Sailor's Grave on the Prairie" (Originally written to commemorate Nedicks and a Minneapolis musician's contempt for the three A.M. cheeseburger with a nickel slice of raw.)	2:34
6.	"Vaseline Machine Gun" (1) for waking up nude in a sleeping bag on the shore of the Atlantic surrounded by a volleyball game at high noon, and 2) for the end of the volleyball game.)	3:11
7.	"Jack Fig" (A reluctant lament.)	2:14

Side Two
No.	Title	Length
1.	"Watermelon" (While at Watermelon Park Music Festival I had the opportunity to play a banjo in the middle of the night for a wandering drunk. When I finished he vomited—an astute comment on my playing. Made me feel very distinguished.)	3:12
2.	"Jesu, Joy of Man's Desiring" (J.S. Bach—The engineer called this the ancient joy of man's desire. (Bach had twenty children because his organ didn't have any stops))	2:24
3.	"The Fisherman" (This is about the mad fishermen of the North whose ice fishing spots resemble national shrines.)	2:32
4.	"The Tennessee Toad" (Who made an epic journey from Ohio to Tennessee.)	2:40
5.	"Busted Bicycle" (Reluctance)	2:48
6.	"The Brain of the Purple Mountain" (From A. L. Tennyson.)	2:11
7.	"Coolidge Rising" (While rising from the sink, cupboard doors opened and engulfed his head; while turning to the right to avoid the whole incident he walked into a refrigerator—which afforded a good chin rest for staring at some bananas in a basket.)	2:50

== Personnel ==
- Leo Kottke – 6- & 12-string guitars

Cover design by Annie Elliott (who also did the cover for 12-String Blues)
