= 12-String Blues =

Live album by Leo Kottke
- Released: 1969
- Venues: The Scholar Coffeehouse, Minneapolis, MN
- Genres: Folk, blues
- Label: Oblivion obl-s1

Leo Kottke chronology
12-String Blues (1969)	6- and 12-String Guitar (1969)

Professional ratings
Review scores
Source	Rating
AllMusic	3/5 stars
The Virgin Encyclopedia of the Blues	3/5 stars

12-String Blues (sub-titled Live at the Scholar) is the first album by American guitarist Leo Kottke, released in 1969.

== History ==
The majority of the album was recorded live at The Scholar, a Minneapolis coffee house (formerly known as the Ten O'Clock Scholar in another location) that had also featured Bob Dylan, Spider John Koerner and Simon & Garfunkel early in their careers. Three of the instrumentals were recorded in a studio. The LP record was a limited edition of 1000 copies, on the Minneapolis West Bank-based Oblivion Records, and has not been reprinted and/or re-issued on CD. Publishing for the songs was by Symposium Music, same as the publishing and record label for Kottke's third LP.

Most of the songs on the album were re-recorded for Kottke's album Circle Round The Sun.

== Track listing (with Kottke's notes) ==
All tracks are written by Leo Kottke, except where noted.

Side one
No.	Title	Length
1.	"If Momma Knew" (One of the first songs I wrote. The second actually, around 1962. At the time I considered evil the only virtue worth cultivating.)	2:08
2.	"So Cold in China" (The title lyric and, consequently, the idea for the song were stolen from somebody who sang at the Ontario Place in Washington when John Hurt worked there.)	4:06
3.	"Furry Jane" (There's not much to say about this one. Its origin was in a couple of nightmares, one of which nearly got me.)	2:01
4.	"Circle 'Round the Sun" (The majority of the lyrics are traditional. Another early song.)	3:03
5.	"Sweet Louise"	3:17
6.	"The Prodigal Grave" (This was written in a fit of terror while trying to calm down. It originally contained many more verses which later served only to confuse, so they were discarded.)	3:01

Side two
No.	Title	Length
1.	"Easter and the Sargasso Sea" (Columbus got stuck in this sea of weeds. There was no wind. Johnny Quest often goes there on business. Consequently resurrection here is not only promising but necessary.)	2:28
2.	"Sunrise"	2:37
3.	"Living in the Country" (Pete Seeger) (Seeger's great contribution to the 12-string. Originally recorded as a guitar duet with Frank Hamilton. Later recorded at high speed with accompanying whistle.)	1:21
4.	"Sail Away Ladies" (John Fahey) (This is John Fahey's arrangement done on Vol.4, Takoma, with Al Wilson and his Veena.)	1:47
5.	"The Last Steam Engine Train" (John Fahey) (Fahey's contribution to steam engines. (Vol.3 Takoma) somewhat augmented and re-arranged.)	1:38
6.	"Long Way Up the River"	2:29
7.	"You Left Me Standing" (In A.)	2:31
8.	"Mary Mary" (I sometimes think people like to hear this song for the same reason they like to watch accidents.)	3:40

Some versions of the album do not include "Long Way Up the River"

== Personnel ==
- Leo Kottke – 6 & 12-string guitars, vocals
- Annie Elliott – cover design

Copyright Symposium Music, BMI 1969
