= The Falconer's Arm I =

Studio album by Robbie Basho
- Released: 1967
- Recorded: 1967
- Studio: Radio KPFA, Berkeley and Santa Cruz, CA
- Genre: American primitivism
- Length: 42:46
- Label: Takoma

Robbie Basho chronology
| Basho Sings (1967) | The Falconer's Arm I (1967) | The Falconer's Arm II (1967) |

Professional ratings
Review scores
| Source | Rating |
|---|---|
| AllMusic | 3/5 stars |

The Falconer's Arm I is the fourth studio album by composer and guitarist Robbie Basho, released in 1967 by Takoma Records.

== Track listing ==
All music is composed by Robbie Basho.

Side one
| No. | Title | Length |
|---|---|---|
| 1. | "The Falconer's Arm" | 9:51 |
| 2. | "Tassajara" | 9:46 |

Side two
| No. | Title | Length |
|---|---|---|
| 1. | "Lost Lagoon Suite" (Walking into the Forest/Prelude/Blue Wolf/Sky Medicine/Finale/Walking Out the Forest) | 12:16 |
| 2. | "Pavan Hindustan" | 6:18 |
| 3. | "Babs" | 4:35 |

== Personnel ==
Adapted from The Falconer's Arm I liner notes.

Musicians

- Robbie Basho – steel-string acoustic guitar, vocals
- Susan Graubard – flute (A2)

Production and additional personnel

- ED Denson – mastering
- Paul Kagan – photography
- Dan McCloskey – engineering

== Release history ==
| Region | Date | Label | Format | Catalog |
|---|---|---|---|---|
| United States | 1967 | Takoma | LP | C-1017 |
