= Mark Fosson =

American singer-songwriter

- Born: May 16, 1950
- Origin: Ashland, Kentucky
- Died: November 2, 2018 (aged 68) Catonsville, Maryland
- Genres: American primitive
- Occupation: Singer-songwriter
- Label: Takoma Records

Mark Steed Fosson (May 16, 1950 – November 2, 2018) was an American singer-songwriter and American primitive guitarist who grew up in Ashland, Kentucky, where he began writing songs while he was still in his early teens. He got his start in the mid to late 1960s, playing in local rock bands until going into service with the Air Force in 1971, and returning home around 1974.

In the late 1970s, he sent some song demos to John Fahey's West Coast-based Takoma Records, and Fahey, impressed with what he heard, offered Fosson a recording deal. Fosson lost no time in relocating to Los Angeles and began recording, but as bad luck would have it, Takoma was in some difficulty, and the label soon folded. Fahey allowed Fosson to retain the master tapes of the sessions, however.

Now located on the West Coast, Fosson met fellow songwriter Edward Tree, and the two began working together, forming the Bum Steers, a country-tinged group, in the late 1980s, eventually being invited to play the Grand Ole Opry at the request of Porter Wagoner. Fosson's material appeared on several soundtracks through the 1990s. In 2001, he began collaborating with singer-songwriter Lisa O'Kane, who recorded several of his songs, including the No. 1 European single "Little Black Cloud" and Fosson also began recording a solo project, Jesus on a Greyhound, which was released on New Light Entertainment/Universal. The record drew positive reviews and Fosson was frequently compared to Americana music artists such as Ramblin' Jack Elliot, Joe Ely, John Prine and Guy Clark. The Fahey material finally saw the light of day as The Lost Takoma Sessions from Drag City Records in 2006. His song "Another Fine Day" was included on Volume 3 of the Imaginational Anthem acoustic guitar compilation from Tompkins Square Records.

On June 26, 2012, Tompkins Square released Digging In The Dust, a collection of early home recordings which led to Fosson's signing to Takoma Records. In May 2015, he released kY, a collection of instrumentals inspired by his time growing up in Kentucky and, in July 2017, his final album, Solo Guitar was released on Drag City Records.

== Death ==
On November 2, 2018, Fosson died of cancer in Catonsville, Maryland.

== Discography ==
- The Bum Steers – Western Beat Records, 1995
- Live At Cafe Voltaire – The Bum Steers – Voltaire Records, 1996
- The Lost Takoma Sessions – Drag City Records, 2006
- Jesus On A Greyhound – Big Otis Records, 2007
- Imaginational Anthem Volume 3 – Tompkins Square Records, 2008
- Hillbilly Hucklebuck – The Bum Steers – Western Beat Records, 2008
- Digging In The Dust – Tompkins Square Records, 2012
- kY – Big Otis Records, 2015
- Solo Guitar – Drag City Records, 2017
