= Cotton-Eyed Joe (disambiguation) =

"Cotton-Eyed Joe" is a traditional American country folk song. It may also refer to:

- "Cotton Eye Joe" (Rednex song), song by Rednex
- Sex & Violins (also known on later US releases as Cotton Eye Joe (Sex & Violins)), 1995 album by Rednex
- Cotton Eyed Joe (album), 2007 album by Karen Dalton
