= The Falconer's Arm II =

Studio album by Robbie Basho
- Released: 1967
- Recorded: 1967
- Studio: Radio KPFA, Berkeley and Santa Cruz, CA
- Genre: American Primitivism
- Length: 42:36
- Label: Takoma
- Producer: Moe Moskowitz

Robbie Basho chronology
| The Falconer's Arm I (1967) | The Falconer's Arm II (1967) | Venus in Cancer (1969) |

Professional ratings
Review scores
| Source | Rating |
|---|---|
| AllMusic | 4/5 stars |

The Falconer's Arm II is the fifth studio album by composer and guitarist Robbie Basho, released in 1967 by Takoma Records.

== Track listing ==
Side one
| No. | Title | Writer(s) | Length |
|---|---|---|---|
| 1. | "Variations on "Shakespeare Wallah"" | Sunyat Raye | 13:51 |
| 2. | "Song of the Snowy Ranges" | Robbie Basho | 8:32 |

Side two
| No. | Title | Writer(s) | Length |
|---|---|---|---|
| 1. | "Pasha" | Robbie Basho | 9:09 |
| 2. | "Song of God" | Billie Roberts | 11:04 |

== Personnel ==
Adapted from The Falconer's Arm II liner notes.

- Robbie Basho – steel-string acoustic guitar, vocals
- ED Denson – mastering
- Paul Kagan – photography
- Dan McCloskey – engineering
- Moe Moskowitz – executive producer

== Release history ==
| Region | Date | Label | Format | Catalog |
|---|---|---|---|---|
| United States | 1967 | Takoma | LP | C-1018 |
