= Visions of the Country =

1978 album by Robbie Basho

Studio album by Robbie Basho
- Released: 1978
- Recorded: Recording Etc. Productions, Berkeley, CA
- Genre: American primitive guitar, progressive folk
- Length: 49:19
- Label: Windham Hill
- Producer: William Ackerman

Robbie Basho chronology
Zarthus (1974)	Visions of the Country (1978)	Art of the Acoustic Steel String Guitar 6 & 12 (1979)

Visions of the Country is the tenth studio album by composer and guitarist Robbie Basho, released in 1978 by Windham Hill Records. It was restored and remastered by Joe Churchich, Kyle Fosburgh, and John Dark and re-issued by Grass-Tops Recording and Gnome Life Records on September 25, 2013.

Combining his usual American primitive guitar style with influences from Hindustani classical music and Native American music, the album is notable for Basho's idiosyncratic vibrato vocals and the mystical romanticism of its predominantly pastoral themes. Ignored upon release, the album is now widely regarded as one of the most important works of the American primitive guitar genre.

== Reception ==
Professional ratings
Review scores
Source	Rating
The Great Folk Discography	4/10
Pitchfork	8.7/10
PopMatters	8/10 stars
Spectrum Culture	3.75/5
Sputnikmusic	5/5

The 2013 reissue of Visions of the Country has generated renewed interest in Basho's work. Bill Meyer of Chicago Reader called it "a distillation of everything great about Basho's mature work. His acoustic fingerpicking is thrillingly propulsive, full of quicksilver changes in direction, but he never gets lost in it." He found his "ululating, hyperemotional singing" as "the perfect vehicle for his shamelessly ardent pledges of love to nature" and noted his "beatific vision of America whose fever-dream romanticism fit so poorly with the rest of the label's catalog that it went out of print in a flash and stayed that way for more than three decades." Grayson Haver Currin of Pitchfork characterized Basho's singing as inaccessible, writing that it "generally wasn’t what you’d call pretty or subtle. During “Night Way" [...] he obscures the wonderful ribbons of his six-string guitar with singing generously described as zealous. He wails a ceremonial Navajo chant, his voice locking into and falling from falsetto, its vibrato smearing the track with warble. [...] These aren't songs you'd really put on during a party or in a mix for a love interest." He concludes: "His music is, at first, rather off-putting, but ultimately, he imagined modes for the guitar and composition that we’re still reconciling. Marnie Stern sometimes maneuvers against her instrument in the same way, and James Blackshaw explores the same nebulous majesty. But Robbie Basho’s music mostly remains a pan-everything oddball, and Visions of the Country is, at last, once again living proof." The general inaccessibility of the music was again echoed by Spectrum Culture's Mike Randall, who wrote that "his use of obscure modes and his chant-like voice (almost a cross between Antony and Israel Kamakawiwo’ole) tends to skirt any sort of beaten path." "The adventure these songs bring, however," he writes, "makes it worthy of a left-of-center trip". "Leveraging the raga style of Hindu music, Basho successfully used his guitar to visualize the wilderness, sketching the running of water, the ferocity of a charging animal, the reach and power of a mountain." Comparisons to Hindustani classical music were also made by Rob Caldwell of Popmatters, who called it the "quintessential Robbie Basho album, containing dazzling instrumental guitar flights as well as songs featuring his operatic singing and whistling (yes, whistling)." Of the latter, he characterized the whistling on "Leaf in the Wind" as "haunting". "Basho turns a suite about the American West into a courtly romance;" wrote John Mulvey for Uncut, "imagine John Renbourn drawing on Native American myth rather than old English legend, perhaps." He found echoes of Tim Buckley in his voice, "especially" on "Blue Crystal Fire". "Of all the guitarists associated with the Takoma School, it’s hard to think of one who imbued folk music with quite as much mystical portent as Robbie Basho."

Aquarium Drunkard included the album on their unranked list "2013 Year In Review", calling the "long out of print opus [...] an absolute joy. Basho’s gorgeous playing (on both guitar and piano) is presented here in the crystalline sound quality it deserves at last. Visions is a majestic, magical thing, a record that conjures up a shimmering, pastoral landscape of the imagination. It doesn’t get much better than this."

== Track listing ==
All music is composed by Robbie Basho.

Side one
No.	Title	Length
1.	"Green River Suite"	7:46
2.	"Rodeo"	2:32
3.	"Rocky Mountain Raga"	7:38
4.	"Variations on Easter"	4:01
5.	"Blue Crystal Fire"	4:49

Side two
No.	Title	Length
1.	"Orphan's Lament"	3:46
2.	"Leaf in the Wind"	4:46
3.	"Night Way"	6:14
4.	"Elk Dreamer's Lament"	4:14
5.	"Call on the Wind"	3:04

== Personnel ==
Adapted from the Visions of the Country liner notes.

Musicians

- Robbie Basho – acoustic guitar, vocals
- Antoinette Marcus – violin (A3)

Production and additional personnel

- William Ackerman – production
- Ed Cooper – cover art
- Dennis Reed – engineering, mixing
- Stan Ricker – mastering

== Release history ==
Region	Date	Label	Format	Catalog
United States	1978	Windham Hill	LP	WHS C-1005
Germany	1981	Pastels	LP	B-ST-2026
United States	2013	Grass-Tops Recording	CD	GTR-0007
United States	2013	Gnome Life	LP	GNM-026
