= Bukka White =

American blues musician (died 1977)

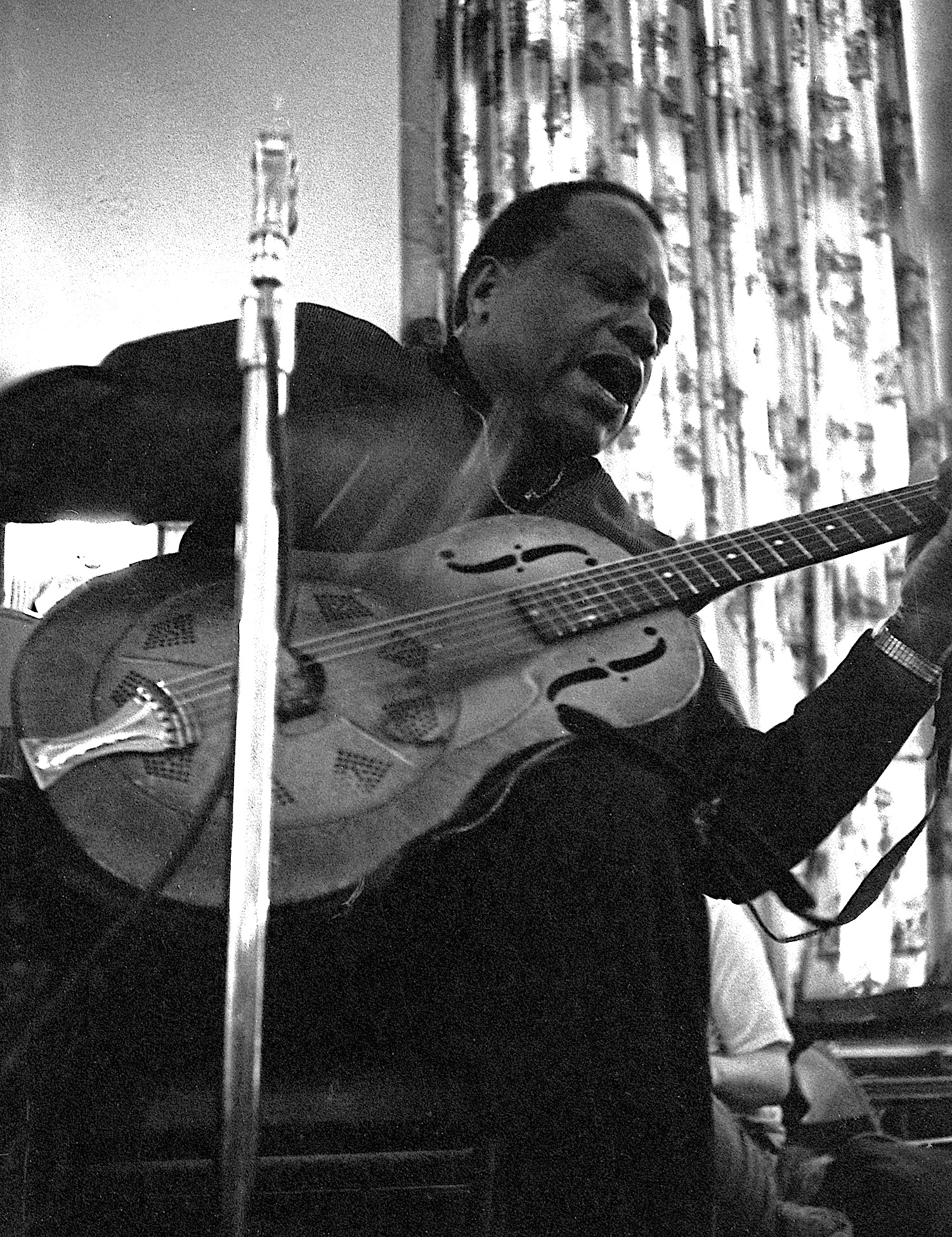
- Bukka White, University of Chicago Folk Festival, 1968

Background information
- Born: Booker T. Washington White; November 12, 1900–1909 between Aberdeen and Houston, Mississippi, U.S.
- Died: February 26, 1977 (aged 67–76) Memphis, Tennessee
- Genres: Delta blues; country blues
- Occupations: Musician; songwriter
- Instruments: Vocals; guitar
- Years active: Late 1920s–1977
- Labels: Victor; Vocalion; Okeh

Booker T. Washington "Bukka" White (November 12, between 1900 and 1909 – February 26, 1977) was an American Delta blues guitarist and singer. His first full-length biography, The Life and Music of Booker "Bukka" White: Recalling the Blues (2024), has been published by the University Press of Mississippi.

== Life and career to the 1950s ==
Booker T. Washington White was born on a farm south of Houston in northeastern Mississippi. He was born on November 12; various years between 1900 and 1909 are recorded – census data suggests 1904. Bukka is a phonetic spelling of White's first name; he was named after the African-American educator and civil rights activist Booker T. Washington. White was a first cousin of B. B. King's mother (White's mother and King's maternal grandmother were sisters). His father, John White, was a railroad worker and a musician who performed locally, primarily playing the fiddle, mandolin, guitar, and piano. He gave Booker a guitar for his ninth birthday. White started his career playing the fiddle at square dances. He got married at 16 years old, with his father giving him a new Stella guitar as a wedding present. He and his wife lived in Houston, but after a few years, she died of a burst appendix.

White moved from the hill country to work on a farm at Swan Lake in the Mississippi Delta. He was a fan of Charley Patton, telling friends, "I wants to come to be a great man like Charlie Patton". He said he never met Patton, though he also claimed to have done so, although this is doubted. White was approached by Ralph Lembo, a white store owner and talent scout, who saw him walking past his store in Itta Bena with a guitar. Lembo took him and his friend Napoleon Hairiston to Memphis, Tennessee, in May 1930 for White's first recording session with Victor Records. Like many other bluesmen, the recordings comprised country blues and gospel music. The gospel songs were done in the style of Blind Willie Johnson, with a female backing singer accentuating the last phrase of each line. Of the fourteen songs recorded, Victor released two under the name Washington White, two gospel songs on one record, released in 1930, and two country blues on the other, released in 1931. Victor published his photograph in 1930.

White's mother died in 1933, and in 1934 he married Susie Simpson, a niece of George 'Bullet' Williams, a harmonica player whom White had started playing with at Glendora in 1932. White and his second wife started farming near Aberdeen, back in the Mississippi hill country east of Houston. He probably first went to Chicago in 1935, travelling from St. Louis with Peetie Wheatstraw, where he made friends with Big Bill Broonzy, Washboard Sam, Memphis Slim, and Tampa Red.

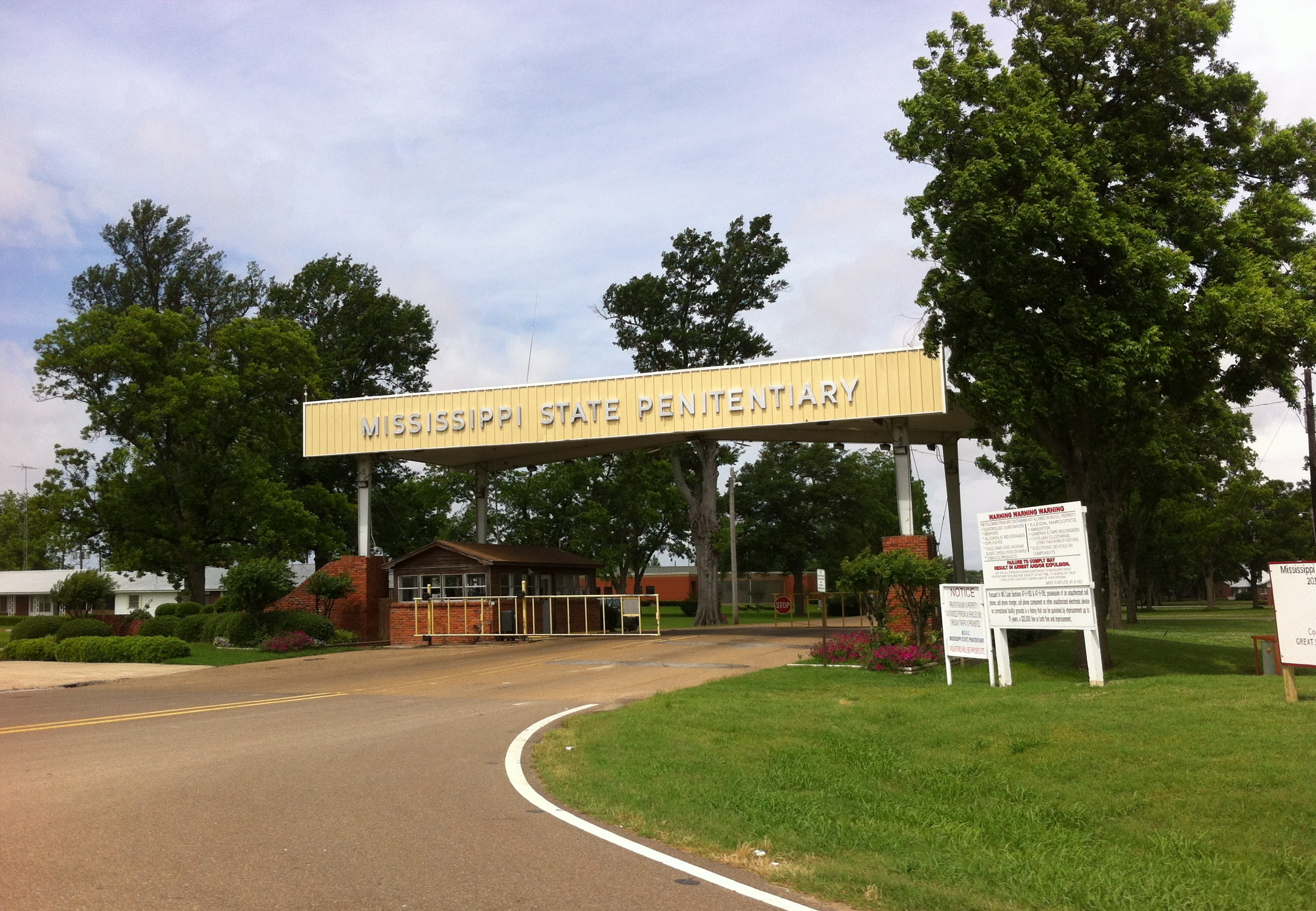
"Parchman Farm Blues" was about the Mississippi State Penitentiary.

He was in Chicago again for a recording session with producer Lester Melrose in early September 1937, where he recorded two songs, "Pinebluff Arkansas" and "Shake 'Em On Down". Back home in Aberdeen in October, he was arrested and charged with murder over shooting a man in the thigh. He was tried on 8 November, convicted of murder, and sentenced to life imprisonment, to be served in the Mississippi State Penitentiary, commonly known as Parchman Farm. His Chicago recordings were released on a 78 record by Vocalion while he was serving time, and "Shake 'Em on Down" became a hit. His version of the oft-recorded song is considered definitive. The folklorist John Lomax visited Parchman Farm in 1939 to record White. As a professional musician who had recorded commercially, White was reluctant to be recorded for free and allowed Lomax to record just two songs, "Po' Boy" and "Sic 'Em Dogs On". "Shake 'Em On Down" and "Po' Boy" became his most well known songs.

White was released from Parchman Farm after serving two years. Soon after, in early 1940, he went to Chicago to record for Melrose again. He arrived with transcripts of the songs he intended to record, but Melrose dismissed them as they were songs others had recorded, so there would be little money in them. Melrose put him up in a hotel and told him to produce some original songs. White returned to Melrose with twelve songs and recorded them on 7 March. They included two relating to his experience in prison – "Parchman Farm Blues" and "When Can I Change My Clothes" – and "Fixin' to Die Blues". After returning to Mississippi, where he and his wife decided to separate permanently, he returned to Chicago, playing in small clubs with his four-piece band.

In 1942, he settled in Memphis, where he worked for two years as a laborer at the Memphis Defense Depot, and then started a job in manufacturing storage tanks at the Newberry Equipment Company, where he remained for 20 years. He continued part-time with professional music, playing small gigs with Frank Stokes for several years, and playing with Memphis Willie B. (Willie Borum). In the second half of the 1940s, his younger cousin B. B. King moved to Memphis and lived with White for ten months. White helped to introduce King to the Memphis music community and to get a job at Newberry Equipment.

The 1950s were lean years for White musically, as new styles of music had largely supplanted the country blues he played.

== Folk blues revival ==
In 1959, White's recording of "Fixin' to Die Blues" was included on the album The Country Blues, compiled by Samuel Charters for Folkways Records to accompany his book of the same name, and was a key element in the American folk music revival of the late 1950s and early 1960s. Bob Dylan included a version of the song on his first album, released in March 1962. Dylan's rendition aided a rediscovery of White in 1963 by guitarist John Fahey and his friend Ed Denson which propelled him into the folk music revival. Fahey and Denson found White when Fahey wrote a letter to White and addressed it to "Bukka White (Old Blues Singer), c/o General Delivery, Aberdeen, Mississippi", assuming from White's song "Aberdeen, Mississippi" that White still lived there. The postcard was forwarded to Memphis. Fahey and Denson traveled there to meet him, and White and Fahey remained friends for the rest of White's life.

White went to California later in 1963, where he played at university folklore classes and club gigs. He made new recordings of many of his early songs for the Mississippi Blues: Bukka White album, which Denson and Fahey released on their own Takoma Records. He also recorded new material for two LPs, Bukka White: Sky Songs Vol. 1 and Vol. 2, released on Chris Strachwitz's Arhoolie Records. Denson became his manager. White was at one time also managed by Arne Brogger, an experienced manager of blues musicians.

White toured North America and Europe for the rest of the 1960s and until 1975. He was friends with musician Furry Lewis, and the two were recorded (mostly in Lewis's Memphis apartment) by Bob West in 1968 for an album, Furry Lewis, Bukka White & Friends: Party! At Home, released on the Arcola label. White recorded two more albums in the 1970s.

White played National resonator guitars in an open tuning, typically with a slide. He was one of the few, along with Skip James, to use a crossnote tuning in E minor, which he may have learned, as James did, from Henry Stuckey. He also played piano, but less adeptly.

He died of cancer in Memphis on 26 February 1977.

== Awards and legacy ==
In 1990, White was posthumously inducted into the Blues Hall of Fame (along with Blind Blake and Lonnie Johnson). On November 21, 2011, the Recording Academy announced the addition of "Fixin' to Die Blues" to its 2012 list of Grammy Hall of Fame Award recipients. In 2011, White was honored with a marker on the Mississippi Blues Trail in Houston, Mississippi. The Bukka White Blues Festival is an annual music festival on Columbus Day Weekend in Aberdeen, Mississippi.

The Led Zeppelin song "Hats Off to (Roy) Harper", on the band's 1970 album Led Zeppelin III, was based in large part on White's "Shake 'Em on Down". "Custard Pie", a song on their 1975 album Physical Graffiti, also references "Shake 'Em on Down."

White's 1963 recordings of "Shake 'Em on Down" and spoken-word piece "Remembrance of Charlie Patton" were both sampled by electronic artist Recoil (mostly a one-man effort by Alan Wilder of Depeche Mode) for the track "Electro Blues for Bukka White" on the 1992 album Bloodline. The song was reworked and re-released on the 2000 EP Jezebel.

In 1995, White's "Aberdeen, Mississippi" was recorded as "Aberdeen" by guitarist Kenny Wayne Shepherd on his debut album, Ledbetter Heights. It reached number 23 on the Billboard (North America) Mainstream Rock Tracks in 1996.

On January 26, 2010, Eric Bibb released Booker's Guitar (TEL 31756 02) through Telarc International Corporation, after being inspired by playing White's National steel guitar. White's "Parchman Farm Blues" was recorded by Jeff Buckley and was released posthumously on the bonus disc of Buckley's album Grace: Legacy Edition.

== Discography ==
=== Singles ===
- "The Promise True and Grand" / "I am in the Heavenly Way" (Victor, 1930)
- "The New Frisco Train" / "The Panama Limited" (Victor, 1931)
- "Pinebluff Arkansas" / "Shake 'Em On Down" (Vocalion, 1937)
- "When Can I Change My Clothes" / "High Fever Blues" (Vocalion, 1940)
- "Special Stream Line" / "Strange Place Blues" (Vocalion, 1940)
- "Black Train Blues" / "Fixin' to Die Blues" (Vocalion, 1940)
- "Good Gin Blues" / "Bukka's Jitterbug Swing" (Okeh, 1940)
- "Parchman Farm Blues" / "District Attorney Blues" (Okeh, 1940)
- "Sleepy Man Blues" / "Aberdeen Mississippi Blues" (Okeh, 1940)

=== Studio albums ===
- Mississippi Blues (Takoma, 1964)√
- Sky Songs (Vol. 1 & 2) (Arhoolie Records, 1965)
- Memphis Hot Shots (Blue Horizon, 1968)
- Big Daddy (Biograph Records, 1974)

=== Live album ===
- Country Blues (Sparkasse in Concert, 1975)

=== Compilation albums ===
- Parchman Farm 1937–1940 (Columbia, 1969)
- Baton Rouge Mosby Street (Blues Beacon, 1982)
- Aberdeen Mississippi Blues 1937–1940 (Travelin' Man, 1985)
- Parchman Farm Blues (Orbis Records, 1992)
- Shake' Em on Down (New Rose, 1993)
- The Complete Bukka White 1937–1940 (Columbia, 1994)
- 1963 Isn't 1962 (Adelphi, 1994)
- Good Gin Blues (Drive, 1995)
- Shake 'Em on Down (Catfish, 1998)
- The Panama Limited (ABM, 2000)
- Revisited (Fuel, 2003)
- Aberdeen Mississippi Blues: The Vintage Recordings 1930–1940 (Document, 2003)
- Mississippi Blues Giant (EPM, 2003)
- Fixin' to Die (Snapper, 2004)
- Parchman Farm Blues (Roots, 2004)
- Aberdeen, Mississippi Blues (Sunset Blvd Records, 2019)

== Footnotes ==
Citations

Works cited

- Hurley, F. Jack; Evans, David (1981). "Bukka White". In Burton, Thomas G. (ed.). Tom Ashley, Sam McGee, Bukka White: Tennessee Traditional Singers. Knoxville: University of Tennessee Press. pp. 143–203.
