= In My Own Time (album) =

Studio album by Karen Dalton
- Released: 1971
- Recorded: 1970–1971
- Studio: Bearsville Studios, Bearsville, New York; Mercy Sound Studios, New York City
- Genre: Folk blues · country rock
- Length: 34:35
- Label: Paramount
- Producer: Harvey Brooks

Karen Dalton chronology
It's So Hard to Tell Who's Going to Love You the Best (1969)	In My Own Time (1971)	Cotton Eyed Joe (2007)

In My Own Time is the second and final studio album by Karen Dalton, released by Paramount Records in 1971. The album was produced by Harvey Brooks and was the last of Dalton's work to be released before her death in 1993. In My Own Time was reissued by Light in the Attic in 2006.

== Reception ==
Professional ratings
Review scores
Source	Rating
Allmusic	4.5/5 stars
Pitchfork Media	(9.0/10)

Writing for AllMusic, Thom Jurek praised the album "a more polished effort than her cozy, somewhat more raw debut... If one can only possess one of Karen Dalton's albums, In My Own Time is the one. It creates a sound world that is simply unlike any other; it pushes the singer outside her comfort zone and therefore brings listeners to the place Dalton actually occupied as a singer. Without apology or concern for technique, she could make any song her own, creating a personal narrative that could reach outside the song itself, moving through her person and becoming the truth for the listener." Steven M. Deusner of Pitchfork Media wrote the album "reveals a demanding, intuitive, eccentric singer and arranger who never sang her own words but clearly and confidently expressed herself with others'."

== Track listing ==
1. "Something on Your Mind" (Dino Valenti) – 3:23
2. "When a Man Loves a Woman" (Calvin Lewis, Andrew Wright) – 2:59
3. "In My Own Dream" (Paul Butterfield) – 4:18
4. "Katie Cruel" (Traditional; arranged by Karen Dalton) – 2:22
5. "How Sweet It Is (To Be Loved by You)" (Lamont Dozier, Brian Holland, Eddie Holland) – 3:43
6. "In a Station" (Richard Manuel) – 3:52
7. "Take Me" (George Jones, Leon Payne) – 4:40
8. "Same Old Man" (Traditional; arranged by Steve Weber) – 2:45
9. "One Night of Love" (Joe Tate) – 3:19
10. "Are You Leaving for the Country" (Richard Tucker) – 3:14

== Personnel ==
- Karen Dalton – vocals, banjo, 12-string guitar, arrangements
- Richard Bell – piano
- Harvey Brooks – bass, arrangements, Album Producer
- Amos Garrett – guitar
- John Hall – guitar solo on "In My Own Dream"
- Daniel Hanken – guitar
- Bill Keith – pedal steel guitar
- Ken Pearson – organ
- Denny Seiwell – drums
- John Simon – piano
- Greg Thomas – drums
- Dennis Whitted – drums
- Bobby Notkoff – violin
- Hart McNee – tenor saxophone
- Robert Fritz – clarinet
- Marcus Doubleday – trumpet
