= Katie Cruel =

American folksong

"Katie Cruel" is a traditional American folksong, likely of Scottish origin. As a traditional song, it has been recorded by many performers, but the best known recording of the song is by Karen Dalton on the album In My Own Time. The American version of the song is said to date to the Revolutionary War period. The song is Roud no. 1645.

== Lyrics ==
The American lyrics appear to contain an oblique story of regret. As given in Eloise Hubbard Linscott's The Folk Songs of Old New England, the full lyrics are:

When I first came to town,
They called me the roving jewel;
Now they've changed their tune,
They call me Katy Cruel,
Oh, diddle, lully day,
Oh, de little lioday.

Chorus
Oh that I was where I would be,
Then I would be where I am not,
Here am I where I must be,
Go where I would, I can not,
Oh, diddle, lully day,
Oh, de little lioday.

When I first came to town,
They brought me the bottles plenty;
Now they've changed their tune,
They bring me the bottles empty,
Oh, diddle, lully day,
Oh, de little lioday.

Chorus

I know who I love,
And I know who does love me;
I know where I'm going,
And I know who's going with me,
Oh, diddle, lully day,
Oh, de little lioday.

Chorus

Through the woods I go,
And through the bogs and mire,
Straightway down the road,
And to my heart's desire,
Oh, diddle, lully day,
Oh, de little lioday.

Chorus

Eyes as bright as coal,
Lips as bright as cherry,
and 'tis her delight
To make the young girls merry,
Oh, diddle, lully day,
Oh, de little lioday.

Chorus

When I first came to town
They called me the roving jewel
Now they've changed their tune
They call me Katy Cruel
Oh, diddle, lully day,
Oh, de little lioday.

== Origins ==
The opening verse of the song bears a strong resemblance to the Scottish song, Licht Bob's Lassie, whose opening verses mirror the song in both notional content and form:

First when I cam' tae the toon
They ca'd me young and bonnie
Noo they've changed my name
Ca' me the licht bob's honey

First when I cam' tae the toon
They ca'd me young and sonsie
Noo they've changed my name
They ca' me the licht bob's lassie

Licht Bob's Lassie would appear to tell a story about a camp follower or sex worker:

I'll dye my petticoats red
And face them wi' the yellow
I'll tell the dyser lad
That the licht bob I'm tae follow

Feather beds are soft
And painted rooms are bonnie
I wad leave them a'
And jog along wi' Johnny

Oh my heart's been sair
Shearin' Craigie's corn
I winnae see him the nicht
But I'll see him the morn

The imagery about dyeing petticoats is shared by the Irish Gaelic lament Siúil A Rúin.

== Performances ==
Dalton's performance of the song is perhaps the best known. About her version, Stephen Thompson has written that "It's unsettling to hear Dalton, who died homeless and haunted, sing of bridges burned and backs turned."

Jerry Garcia also performed the song, as have a number of other performers, including Peggy Seeger, Sandy Paton, the New Christy Minstrels ("Miss Katy Cruel", 1965), Odetta, Robin Pecknold (Fleet Foxes), Gingerthistle, Linda Thompson, Moira Smiley, Allysen Callery, Molly Tuttle (The Tuttles and AJ Lee), Joe Dassin and Bert Jansch (with Beth Orton and Devendra Banhart). Cordelia's Dad recorded the song on their 1995 release, Comet. The Demon Barbers also recorded the song on their 2002 album Uncut. White Magic started covering the song live in 2004, and released it as a single in 2006. French singer and actress Marie Laforêt recorded English and French versions of the song in the 1960s. The Owl Service recorded a version of the song on their album A Garland of Song.

Agnes Obel did a version in 2011. The song also features on Raise Ravens, a 2011 release by Glasgow-based John Knox Sex Club who have brought together elements of both versions of the song. The song also features on Lady Maisery's second album, Mayday (released in 2013). Lisa LeBlanc recorded a version of the song on the album Highways, Heartaches and Time Well Wasted in 2014. Rillian and the Doxie Chicks, a Los Angeles-based, pirate-themed folk band, also released a version of the song on their second CD Left in the Longboat' in 2011.

The song "When I First Came to Town" by Nick Cave and the Bad Seeds, from their 1992 album Henry's Dream, was adapted from Dalton's version of "Katy Cruel" though rewritten from the perspective of a male narrator. The song was also recorded by the Irish band Lankum on their 2019 album The Livelong Day.
