= Cotton Eyed Joe (album) =

Live album by Karen Dalton
- Released: 2007
- Recorded: October 1962
- Venue: The Attic, Boulder, Colorado
- Genre: Folk blues
- Label: Megaphone Music
- Producer: Joe Loop

Karen Dalton chronology
In My Own Time (1971)	Cotton Eyed Joe (2007)	Green Rocky Road (2008)

Professional ratings
Review scores
Source	Rating
AllMusic	link
Pitchfork Media	(8.0/10) - link

Cotton Eyed Joe is a live album by American musician Karen Dalton recorded in October 1962, but not released until 2007, as a set of two CDs and a DVD.

At the time Dalton, her husband, and daughter lived in a shack in the Colorado mountains, without electricity or running water, and she would occasionally play at the Attic, a folk club in Boulder, Colorado. The album is a recording of a performance there, made by the club's co-proprietor and a friend of Dalton's, Joe Loop.

== Track listing ==
CD 1

1. "It's All Right" (Ray Charles) – 5:45
2. "Everytime I Think of Freedom" (Traditional) – 3:03
3. "Cotton-Eyed Joe" (Traditional) – 4:31
4. "Pastures of Plenty" (Woody Guthrie) – 3:52
5. "One May Morning" (Traditional) – 4:17
6. "Red Are the Flowers" (Fred Neil) – 5:31
7. "Blues On the Ceiling" (Fred Neil) – 3:20
8. "Run Tell That Major" (Traditional) – 3:22
9. "Down and Out" (Jimmy Cox) – 3:43
10. "Fannin' Street" (Huddie Ledbetter) – 2:33

CD 2

1. "In The Evening" (Leroy Carr) – 5:10
2. "Old Hannah" (Traditional) – 3:27
3. "Pallet On Your Floor" (Jelly Roll Morton) – 3:38
4. "Prettiest Train" (Traditional, Lomax Prison Recordings) – 4:10
5. "Mole in the Ground" (Traditional) – 5:48
6. "Darlin' Corey" (Traditional) – 4:42
7. "It Hurts Me Too" (Mel London) – 4:12
8. "Katie Cruel" (Traditional) – 2:34
9. "Blackjack" (Ray Charles) – 3:12
10. "No More Taters" (Traditional) – 4:57
11. "Good Morning Blues" (Huddie Ledbetter) – 3:36

DVD

1. "God Bless the Child" (Billie Holiday, Arthur Herzog, Jr.)
2. "It Hurts Me Too" (Mel London)
3. "Little Bit of Rain" (Fred Neil)
4. "Blues Jumped The Rabbit" (Traditional)

== Personnel ==
- Karen Dalton - vocals, 12-string guitar, banjo

Technical

- Joe Loop - recording
