= It's So Hard to Tell Who's Going to Love You the Best =

Studio album by Karen Dalton
- Released: 1969; August 19, 1997 (reissue)
- Recorded: 1969
- Studio: Studio A, The Record Plant, New York City
- Genre: Folk blues; Appalachian music
- Length: 30:46
- Label: Capitol; Koch Entertainment (reissue); Megaphone (reissue)
- Producer: Nick Venet; Nicholas Hill (reissue)

Karen Dalton chronology
It's So Hard to Tell Who's Going to Love You the Best (1969)	In My Own Time (1971)

Professional ratings
Review scores
Source	Rating
AllMusic	4.5/5 stars
The Guardian	4/5 stars

It's So Hard to Tell Who's Going to Love You the Best is the debut album by American folk blues musician Karen Dalton, originally released in 1969 by Capitol Records (see 1969 in music).

The album was subsequently reissued on CD by the Koch label in 1997. Extended liner notes were written by Peter Stampfel of the Holy Modal Rounders, who writes:

She was the only folk singer I ever met with an authentic 'folk' background. She came to the folk music scene under her own steam, as opposed to being 'discovered' and introduced to it by people already involved in it."

In 1999, Megaphone issued the album again, this time with new packaging, a new booklet and a DVD with archival footage.

In 2009, Light In The Attic Records, once again, reissued the album on vinyl with new packaging and liner notes.

== Track listing ==
1. "Little Bit of Rain" (Fred Neil) – 2:30
2. "Sweet Substitute" (Jelly Roll Morton) – 2:40
3. "Ribbon Bow" (Traditional; adapted by Karen Dalton) – 2:55
4. "I Love You More Than Words Can Say" (Eddie Floyd, Booker T. Jones) – 3:30
5. "In the Evening (It's So Hard to Tell Who's Going to Love You the Best)" (Leroy Carr) – 4:29
6. "Blues on the Ceiling" (Fred Neil) – 3:30
7. "It Hurts Me Too" (Mel London) – 3:05
8. "How Did the Feeling Feel to You" (Tim Hardin) – 2:52
9. "Right, Wrong or Ready" (Major Wiley) – 2:58
10. "Down on the Street (Don't You Follow Me Down)" (Lead Belly) – 2:17

== Personnel ==
- Karen Dalton - 12-string guitar, banjo, vocals
- Kim King - electric guitar
- Dan Hankin - acoustic guitar
- Harvey Brooks - bass
- Gary Chester - percussion

Technical

- Lillian Douma, Sandy Fisher - engineers
- Joel Brodsky - photography
