= Venus in Cancer =

Studio album by Robbie Basho
- Released: 1969
- Recorded: Sierra Sound, Berkeley, CA
- Genre: American primitivism
- Length: 49:37
- Label: Blue Thumb
- Producer: Ed Bogus

Robbie Basho chronology
The Falconer's Arm II (1967)	Venus in Cancer (1969)	Song of the Stallion (1971)

Professional ratings
Review scores
Source	Rating
AllMusic	4/5 stars
The Great Folk Discography	8/10
Mojo	5/5 stars
Pitchfork Media	7.8/10
The Stranger	3/5 stars

Venus in Cancer is the sixth studio album by composer and guitarist Robbie Basho, released in 1969 by Blue Thumb Records.

== Track listing ==
All music is composed by Robbie Basho.

Side one
No.	Title	Length
1.	"Venus in Cancer"	9:30
2.	"Eagle Sails the Blue Diamond Waters"	6:47
3.	"Kowaka d'Amour"	9:55

Side two
No.	Title	Length
1.	"Song for the Queen"	9:27
2.	"Cathedrals et Fleur de Lis"	8:01
3.	"Wine Song (Sweet Wine of Love)"	5:49

== Personnel ==
Adapted from the Venus in Cancer liner notes.

Musicians

- Robbie Basho – steel-string acoustic guitar, vocals
- Victor Chancellor – acoustic guitar (A2)
- Moreen Libet – viola (B1)
- Kreke Ritter – French horn (B1)

Production and additional personnel

- Ed Bogus – production
- Bob DeSousa – engineering
- Barry Feinstein – photography
- Paul Slaughter – photography
- Roy Ward – engineering
- Tom Wilkes – design, photography

== Release history ==
Region	Date	Label	Format	Catalog
United States	1969	Blue Thumb	LP	BTS 10
United States	1996	Tompkins Square	CD	TSQ1820
United States	2011	Blue Thumb	LP	BTS 10
