= Charlie Nothing =

American musician, musical instrument maker and writer

- Charlie Nothing in the mid-1970s playing the Big Ding, a dingulator he created from a 1954 Chevrolet automobile.

Background information
- Born: Charles Martin Simon; July 8, 1941; Newark, New Jersey, U.S.
- Origin: United States
- Died: October 23, 2007 (aged 66) Soquel, California, U.S.
- Genres: Folk rock, experimental rock, free improvisation
- Occupations: Musician; musical instrument maker; writer
- Instruments: Dingulator, saxophone
- Years active: 1965–2007
- Labels: Takoma, De Stijl
- Website: charlesmartinsimon.com

Charles Martin Simon (July 8, 1941 – October 23, 2007), better known as Charlie Nothing, was an American musician, musical instrument maker and writer. He created the dingulator, guitar sculptures made out of American cars, and performed at several music festivals in the United States and Europe. He made two albums and published 12 books.

== Biography ==
Charles Martin Simon was schooled at the Montclair Academy for Boys (later the Montclair Kimberley Academy) in Montclair, New Jersey. After graduating in 1959, Simon went to Rutgers University in New Jersey, where he majored in agriculture and English literature. But after two years at university he grew unhappy with the courses and dropped out.

After the death of his artist wife in 1965, Simon was "reduced to nothing", which produced a "psyche fragmentation" he called Charlie Nothing the Artist. As Charlie Nothing, he pursued music and the visual arts. He created guitar sculptures made out of American cars he called dingulators and formed a number of "dingulation" bands in the 1960s, 1970s and 1980s.

In the mid-1960s in New York City, Nothing formed his first band, which included himself on sopranino saxophone, a classically trained Indian tabla player and a female Japanese vocalist. Then came The First Uniphrenic Church and Bank Band, a group which played at The Village Gate and is said to have included "a young, pre-Blondie Debbie Harry."

Nothing moved to Los Angeles in 1966, where he performed in a show with Frank Zappa and briefly joined the cast of the musical Hair. He then moved to the San Francisco Bay Area, where he recorded his first album for John Fahey's Takoma Records, The Psychedelic Saxophone of Charlie Nothing. It featured a sequence of saxophone improvisations by Nothing accompanied by gong, conga and a banjo ukulele. Nothing also did the album cover artwork. The album did not sell well in the United States, but achieved minor cult status in Europe in free improvised music circles.

In 1967 Nothing moved to Santa Cruz, California, where he joined an organic farming movement and for the next ten years, worked a 21-acre (8.5 ha) farm entirely by hand. According to bandmate, Patrick Bisconti, Nothing lived in a shelter made of canvas tarps caring for goats, chickens, rabbits, dogs, and Arabian horses, a vegetable garden and bonzai trees. He continued his musical performances until 1984, during which time he also recorded several songs, including "Steal-A-Meal", "Fuck You and Your Stupid Wars", "Eatin' Ain't Cheatin" and "A Pizza and a Piece of Ass". In the mid-1970s he formed The Superfabulous Dingulators, a band consisting of Charlie Nothing (dingulator), Patrick Bisconti (dingulator), John Kertisz (bamboo flute) and Jesse Ward Jr. (percussion).

Between 1984 and 2005, Nothing stopped performing and focused on his other activities, which included beekeeping and writing. Under the name Charles Martin Simon he set up his own Stinging Insect Removal business, and published over a dozen fiction and non-fiction books, each handmade and self-published under his own publishing company, Dead Tree Press. His non-fiction included books on health and nutrition, and his accounts of the psychedelic 1960s.

In 2004 Nothing resumed performing in public again. He started playing at small venues in the Santa Cruz area, but soon began receiving invitations to play at music festivals. He gave a dingulation performance in 2005 at the Two Million Tongues Festival in Chicago, and in 2006 at the Pauze Festival in Ghent, Belgium, with Swedish musician Jakob Olausson. In 2007 he released a new CD of dingulator songs entitled My Cuntree Tits of Me, a play on the phrase "my country, 'tis of thee".

Charlie Nothing died of cancer at the age of 66 on October 23, 2007, at his home in Soquel, California. An anthology album, 40 Years of the Ding : A Charlie Nothing Anthology comprising all his previously recorded LPs and singles, plus privately released cassette recordings was scheduled to be released by De Stijl Records towards the end of 2008.

Charlie Nothing characterized himself as a "Philosopher/Clown" who, according to his official biography, "Was not born. Did not die. Does not, did not, will not exist."

== Dingulator ==
A collection of dingulators created by Charlie Nothing.

Dingulators are guitar sculptures made out of recycled automotive steel. They are a class of musical instrument invented by Charlie Nothing and each construction is unique with its own sound.

Dingulators are steel-string acoustic guitars having typically seven or eight and sometimes up to 21 strings. They have friction pegs and raised frets like those on a sitar. Tuning a dingulator is "variable, organic and evolving." According to Nothing, "the ideal would be to never tune them, to just find where they are going and go with it ... but sometimes I do make adjustments." Nothing, a skilled artisan and welder, used old cars as his material because "cars have the right kind of steel ... [they've] got very soulful steel." Nothing was also making a political statement with his artistic recycling. "It's a sword-to-plowshare kind of thing," he said. "Cars to guitars."

When Nothing began touring, he found taking his big and bulky dingulators aboard aircraft problematic. To overcome these difficulties he developed a smaller portable version with a detachable neck that could be stored in the body, making a compact steel carrying case he could take on airlines.

Folk singer-songwriter Josephine Foster, who featured on the same bill as Nothing at the Two Million Tongues Festival in Chicago in 2005, described dingulators as "folk-art masterpieces". She said they sound like "tuned percussion [that] animate and punctuate [Nothing's] spoken-word diatribes." They are also reminiscent of Hans Reichel's pre-daxophone modified-guitar recordings, and of Derek Bailey's improvised music, although Nothing was unfamiliar with both these musicians. Nothing described his musical influences as "everything ... probably as much by the stuff I don't like as the stuff I like."

A photograph of one of Nothing's dingulators appears as the back cover art of Hearts and Minds, Musical Instrument Makers of America by editors Nancy Ellis and Robert Bailey, and photographer Jake Jacobson. A dingulator is also the cover art on "The Western Region" section of the book.

== Discography ==
=== Albums ===
- The Psychedelic Saxophone of Charlie Nothing (1967, LP, Takoma Records)
- My Cuntree Tits of Me (2007, CD, Self-published)
- 40 Years of the Ding : A Charlie Nothing Anthology (2008, CD, De Stijl Records)
- Charlie Nothing & Dingulator reissue (2010, cassette, De Stijl Records)

=== Singles ===
- Charlie Nothing Dingulator Band: "Ain't No Fascist"/"Dingulation No. 1" (1980, 7", Beyond Omega)

=== Appears on ===
- Various artists: So Much Fire to Roast Human Flesh (2006, CD, Bastet) – one track by Charlie Nothing, "Fuck You and Your Stupid Wars"
- Various artists: Teenage Meadows of Infinity (Rare Psychs & Stomps) / From the Ashes Perfect Attainment Shall Be (Modern Freaked Sounds) (2007, 2xCD, Drag City) – one track by Charlie Nothing, "Steal-A-Meal"

== Bibliography (as Charles Martin Simon) ==
All Simon's book are handmade and self-published.

=== Non-fiction ===
- Goodnight Cambodia: Forbidden History (1997, ISBN 1-892489-00-7)
- Speeding Through Satori (1997, ISBN 1-892489-01-5)
- Life and Crimes: Charlie Nothing (2000, ISBN 1-892489-09-0)
- Health Enlightenment.com (2002, ISBN 1-892489-11-2)

=== Fiction ===
- Starworms: The Santa Cruz Savior Project (1997, ISBN 1-892489-02-3)
- The Real Mickey Mouse (1997, ISBN 1-892489-03-1)
- DragonSlime (1997, ISBN 1-892489-04-X)
- AmericaCar: A Novel (1998, ISBN 1-892489-07-4)
- Editor Murders Unmystery (1998, ISBN 1-892489-05-8)
- The Money (1998, ISBN 1-892489-06-6)
- The Collection (1998, ISBN 1-892489-08-2)
- Adventures of Dickless Traci (2001, ISBN 1-892489-10-4)
