= Basho Sings =

Studio album by Robbie Basho
- Released: 1967
- Recorded: February 9, 1966
- Genre: American primitivism
- Length: 41:47
- Label: Takoma

Robbie Basho chronology
The Grail & the Lotus (1966)	Basho Sings (1967)	The Falconer's Arm I (1967)

Basho Sings is the third studio album by composer and guitarist Robbie Basho, released in 1967 by Takoma Records.

== Track listing ==
All music is composed by Robbie Basho.

Side one
No.	Title	Length
1.	"Salangadou"	4:19
2.	"Dance Colinda"	3:12
3.	"Katari Takawaitha"	3:49
4.	"Basket Full of Dragons"	3:37
5.	"Solilquoy"	5:00
6.	"Tibetan Bach"	1:44

Side two
No.	Title	Length
1.	"Allons au Ball Colinda"	4:09
2.	"Basho's Blues"	2:46
3.	"Black Mare Moan"	6:15
4.	"New Lhassa New Year's Chorale"	6:53

== Personnel ==
Adapted from the Basho Sings liner notes.

- Robbie Basho – vocals, steel-string acoustic guitar
- Paul Kagan – photography
- Tom Weller – design

== Release history ==
Region	Date	Label	Format	Catalog
United States	1967	Takoma	LP	C-1012
