= Circle Round the Sun =

Circle 'Round the Sun

Studio album by Leo Kottke
- Released: 1970
- Genre: Folk, new acoustic, American primitive guitar
- Length: 30:15
- Label: Symposium (SYS-2001)
- Producer: Skip Hotchkiss, George Hanson

Leo Kottke chronology
6- and 12-String Guitar (1969)	Circle 'Round the Sun (1970)	Mudlark (1971)

Circle 'Round the Sun is the third album by American guitarist Leo Kottke, released in 1970.

== History ==
Eight of its eleven songs are studio re-recordings of songs from his first (live) album 12-String Blues. Although they should have been improved by being recorded in a professional studio, there is noticeable oversaturation in many of the songs, causing his vocal to break up. Kottke has often been quoted as being unhappy with the recording quality. It has not been re-issued on CD.

== Reception ==
Professional ratings
Review scores
Source	Rating
Allmusic	3/5 stars

Writing for Allmusic, music critic Chip Renner said of the album, "This is a good, hard to find record."

== Track listing ==
All songs by Leo Kottke except as noted

=== Side one ===
1. "If Momma Knew" § – 2:30
2. "Furry Jane" § – 1:45
3. "Sweet Louise" § – 3:04
4. "Tell Me Mama" (Traditional) – 2:58
5. "Long Way Up the River" § – 2:18

=== Side two ===
1. "Circle 'Round the Sun" § – 3:23
2. "So Cold in China" § – 4:04
3. "Easter and the Sargasso Sea" § – 3:09
4. "The Prodigal Grave" § – 2:39
5. "Living in the Country" § (Pete Seeger) – 1:21
6. "Tell Me This Ain't the Blues" – 2:53

§ = previously recorded on 12-String Blues

== Personnel ==
- Leo Kottke - 6 & 12-string guitar, vocals

== Production notes ==
- Engineered by Bob Schultz, Roger Wilhelmi, Skip Hotchkiss, George Hanson
- Production: Skip Hotchkiss, George Hanson
