= Bonn ist Supreme =

Live album by Robbie Basho
- Released: April 7, 2008
- Recorded: November 24, 1980
- Venue: Kulturforum, Bonn, Germany
- Genre: American Primitivism
- Length: 66:23
- Label: Bo'Weavil
- Producer: Glenn Jones

Robbie Basho chronology
Băshovia (2001)	Bonn ist Supreme (2008)

Professional ratings
Review scores
Source	Rating
PopMatters	(8/10)

Bonn ist Supreme is a live performance album by composer and guitarist Robbie Basho, released on April 7, 2008 by Bo'Weavil Recordings.

== Track listing ==
All music is composed by Robbie Basho.

No.	Title	Length
1.	"Redwood Ramble"	3:19
2.	"Fandango"	2:49
3.	"(Variations On) Easter"	5:36
4.	"Rocky Mountain Raga"	9:00
5.	"Cathedrals et Fleur de Lis"	9:00
6.	"German Chocolate Cake"	2:10
7.	"Silky Jane"	3:24
8.	"The Grail and the Lotus"	8:53
9.	"Pavan India"	8:15
10.	"Variations on Clair de Lune"	4:46
11.	"California Raga"	9:11

== Personnel ==
Adapted from the Bonn ist Supreme liner notes.

- Robbie Basho – acoustic guitar
- Matthew Azevedo – mastering
- Glenn Jones – production

== Release history ==
Region	Date	Label	Format	Catalog
United Kingdom	2008	Bo'Weavil	CD	WEAVIL29
