= Steffen Basho-Junghans =

German guitarist and composer (1953–2022)

- Born: 27 November 1953; Reinsdorf, Bezirk Karl-Marx-Stadt, East Germany
- Origin: North Thuringia, East Germany
- Died: 1 December 2022 (aged 69)
- Years active: 1979–2022
- Labels: Blue Moment Arts; Strange Attractors; Locust; Sillyboy; Preservation; Kning Disk

Steffen Basho-Junghans (born Steffen Junghans; 27 November 1953 – 1 December 2022) was a German guitarist and composer.

== Biography ==
Basho-Junghans was born in North Thuringia in the former German Democratic Republic on 27 November 1953. At the age of 17 he taught himself to play acoustic guitar and in 1978 formed the folk band Wacholder. In 1979, influenced by the American guitarist Leo Kottke, he began performing solo instrumental music on 6- and 12-string guitar. Throughout the 1980s he became influenced by artists on John Fahey's Takoma Records label. During this period he discovered the music of Robbie Basho, and consequently became interested in Japanese haiku poet Matsuo Bashō, who had influenced Robbie Basho. Steffen Junghans incorporated the name 'Basho' into his own, as a mark of respect. Throughout the 1980s he lectured on acoustic guitar history and performed numerous concerts.

Basho-Junghans has released recordings on the German label Blue Moment Arts; the American labels Sublingual, Strange Attractors and Locust; the Italian label Sillyboy; the Australian label Preservation; and Kning Disk in Sweden, appears on several compilations. His music, unorthodox explorations between traditions and experimentation, is influenced by North American Indian, Asian, New music and European classical music.

Basho-Junghans died from cancer on 1 December 2022, at the age of 69.

== Discography ==
- 12-String Solo MC (Blue Moment Arts|Blue Moment Arts, 1989)
- In Search of the Eagle's Voice CD (BMA, 1995)
- Fleur De Lis 1 & 2 2x CD (BMA, 1996)
- Song of the Earth CD (Sublingual Records, 2000)
- Inside CD (Strange Attractors, 2001)
- Landscapes in Exile CD (Blue Moment Arts, 2001)
- Waters in Azure CD (Strange Attractors, 2002)
- Rivers and Bridges CD (Strange Attractors, 2003)
- 7 Books dbl CD (Strange Attractors, 2004)
- Unknown Music I: Alien Letter CD (Sillyboy, 2005)
- Unknown Music II: Transwarp Meditation CD (Preservation, 2005)
- In the Morning Twilight CD (Kning Disk, 2006)
- Last Days of the Dragons CD (Locust, 2006)
- Late Summer Morning CD (Strange Attractors, 2006)
- "IS" LP (Architects of Harmonic Rooms & Records, 2009)
- Unknown Music III: O Som Naha MC (Beartown Records, 2010)

== See also ==
- American primitive guitar
