= Muireann Bradley =

Irish musician

- Born: December 18, 2006 (age 19); Ballybofey, County Donegal, Ireland
- Origin: County Donegal, Ireland
- Genres: Country blues, ragtime
- Occupations: Musician, singer
- Instrument: Guitar (fingerpicking style)
- Years active: 2020–present
- Labels: Tompkins Square Records (2023); Decca Records (2024–present)
- Website: www.muireannbradley.ie

Muireann Bradley (born 18 December 2006) is an Irish musician from County Donegal who plays and sings country blues and ragtime guitar from the 1920s, 1930s and 1940s in the fingerpicking style of the original artists. Bradley began learning guitar at the age of nine. On 31 December 2023, aged 17, she appeared on BBC TV's Jools' Annual Hootenanny show and was given a standing ovation for her performance of Rev Gary Davis's 1961 song 'Candyman'. Following this television appearance, her debut album I Kept These Old Blues entered the top ten of the UK Albums Download Chart. Bradley signed to Decca Records in December 2024. Decca released a remastered version of I Kept These Old Blues on vinyl in February 2025.

== Early years ==
Bradley was born in Ballybofey, County Donegal, in December 2006. Her father is a musician and her mother is an English teacher. Her father introduced her to authentic blues and ragtime music as a child and taught her to play the guitar. Her early influences included Blind Blake, Rev Gary Davis, Memphis Minnie, Elizabeth Cotten, Mississippi John Hurt, Stefan Grossman, Robert Johnson and John Fahey. She also found inspiration in the work of musicians who were recording this music in the 1960s.

Bradley said she had grown up "steeped in these old blues". Her father played the music constantly "and talked about it endlessly", telling stories of the lives of the musicians as if they were mythology. In an interview Bradley recalled, "My father could play all this stuff on guitar and I remember watching him when I was very young and thinking, 'I want to be able to do that'." At the age of nine she was given a small travel guitar with extra-light strings and began learning, but at first school sports activities competed for practice time. The COVID lockdowns that began in March 2020 allowed her to focus on the guitar, and from that point she learned very quickly. She wrote a list of songs that she wanted to be able to play, and when she was 13 a video of her performing the first song on the list, Blind Blake's 'Police Dog Blues', was posted on YouTube. She told Guitar World in October 2024, "It's important to keep the songs going. These musicians are so amazing, we should keep their memory alive."

=== 2023: Debut album, BBC TV performance ===
In 2020, Josh Rosenthal of Tompkins Square Records in San Francisco saw Bradley on YouTube and offered to produce an album of her music. The album was made over the next three years as simple, mostly one-take recordings of voice and acoustic guitar through one mic with no overdubs, in a small studio in Ballybofey by local producer Terry McGinty. It was released in December 2023 titled "I Kept These Old Blues". A BBC producer who heard the album was impressed and invited Bradley to perform on BBC television. On 31 December 2023, aged 17, Bradley appeared on BBC TV's Jools Holland's Annual Hootenanny and was given a standing ovation for her performance of the 1961 Rev Gary Davis song "Candyman". Her first gig had been only a few months before at the Ballyshannon Folk and Traditional Music Festival in Donegal. She said in an interview that "Candyman" was a song she had known and loved for as long as she could remember.

"I Kept These Old Blues" contained 12 tracks of finger-picked acoustic guitar versions of the original songs, recorded usually in one take each with no overdubs or effects. Acoustic Guitar magazine said the songs were performed with "great authenticity and conviction and a prodigious fingerstyle technique". Americana UK said Bradley had a "singular talent" and her playing had "a virtuoso confidence . . . bolstered by undeniable skill and a profound affection for the music". Guitarist Stefan Grossman, quoted in The Journal of Music, said Bradley was "a wonderful player".

The tracks on "I Kept These Old Blues" were "Candyman", "Richland Woman Blues", Police Dog Blues", Shake Sugaree", "Vestapol", "Stagolee", "Green Rocky Road", "Frankie", "Police Sergeant Blues", "Buck Dancer's Choice", "Delia" and "Freight Train". The album was re-released in February 2025 with an extra track, "When the Levee Breaks".

=== 2024: Radio appearances, international gigs ===
In the summer of 2024, Bradley played shows and festivals around Ireland and Britain and some in Germany and the Netherlands. Her audiences included an enthusiastic 6,000-strong crowd at the 'All Together Now' festival in County Waterford. Future performances were booked in America, Australia and the Caribbean, including an appearance on Joe Bonamassa's 'Keeping the Blues Alive' show. Bradley played live sessions on Cerys Matthews' BBC Radio 2 Blues Show, the Stephen McCauley show on BBC Radio Ulster and Ray Cuddihy's sessions on RTÉ Radio 1. Her debut album reached No.1 on the Amazon UK download chart, was in the top 10 on the UK ITunes chart and entered the Amazon 'New Folk Music' chart in the US. Copies of the album sold out and went to second and third pressings. By December 2024 her performances online had been viewed over two million times.

=== Signing to Decca ===
In December 2024 it was announced that Bradley had signed to Decca Records. Decca remastered "I Kept These Old Blues" and re-released the album on vinyl in February 2025 with an extra track, Memphis Minnie and Kansas Joe McCoy's "When the Levee Breaks". Bradley said that being associated with a historic label that had produced legends such as Billie Holiday, Nina Simone and Ella Fitzgerald "was a dream come true".

=== 2025: Performances and international tour dates, Rose Dogs EP ===
Bradley performed in St Patrick's Cathedral in Dublin on 25 January 2025 as part of TradFest, the city's annual celebration of Irish music and culture, and live on RTÉ's Late Late Show on 28 February 2025, the day "I Kept These Old Blues" was re-released by Decca.

In 2025 Bradley toured Australia, America, Spain, Belgium, Canada, UK and Ireland. The tour included performances at Joe Bonamassa's 'Keeping the Blues Alive' in Miami, Florida; Kennedy Center, Washington DC, USA; the Omagh Bluegrass Festival in Northern Ireland; the Edinburgh Jazz & Blues Festival; Moseley Folk & Arts Festival in Birmingham; and the Purcell Room in London. In May she performed at the opening night of the Rory Gallagher International Tribute Festival in Ballyshannon, Donegal. In October she played alongside Neil Young, Lana Del Rey and others in a benefit gig at the Harvest Moon Festival in California. In September 2025, she released a cover of the Jackson Browne song "These Days" as the lead single from her first EP. Titled Rose Dogs, it was released on 7 November 2025 and featured Bradley's first original song, "No Name Blues".

=== 2026: Blackwood Pew EP ===
In July 2026, Bradley released an original song, 'Not Going Back', which was composed in the studio with her producer Declan Gaffney and "the brilliant Wildes (Ella Walker)". The song was recorded with a full rhythm section. Bradley said that while she loved performing solo, having a rhythm section freed her from having to be the drummer and bass player. She had been able to move away from the "bluesier influences" in her songwriting to focus on her vocals and guitar playing, and the collaboration had felt "natural and positive."

On 5 August, 2026, Bradley released a cover of Daniel Johnston's "True Love Will Find You in the End", the second single from her EP Blackwood Pew which would also feature "Not Going Back". The EP was due to be released physically alongside Rose Dogs as a double-EP set.

== Guitars ==
Bradley began learning to play on a small, short-scale travel guitar with extra-light strings. In 2024 she was playing a Gibson LG-2 reissue for a period-correct sound, a Waterloo WL-S Deluxe with ladder bracing, her father's X-braced Waterloo WL-14 with a chunky V-profile neck, and a new short scale, small bodied, Custom McNally Guitars 'S' model, made for her by Armagh-based luthier Ciaran McNally.

== Discography ==
Studio albums

- I Kept These Old Blues (2023, Tompkins Square Records; 2025, Decca Records)

Extended plays

- Rose Dogs (2025; Decca Records)
- Blackwood Pew (2026; A Fontana Records)

Singles

- "Candyman" (2024; Decca Records)
- "When the Levee Breaks" (2025; Decca Records)
- "Don't Think Twice It's Alright" (2025; Decca Records)
- "I'm So Lonesome I Could Cry" (2025; Decca Records)
- "These Days" (2025; Decca Records)
- "Clay Pigeons" (2025; Decca Records)
