= Twilight Peaks =

Studio album by Robbie Basho
- Released: 1984
- Genre: American primitive guitar
- Length: 39:24
- Label: Basho

Robbie Basho chronology
Bouquet (1983)	Twilight Peaks (1984)	Guitar Soli (1996)

Twilight Peaks is the fourteenth and final studio album by composer and guitarist Robbie Basho, released independently in 1984 by Basho Productions.

== Track listing ==
All music is composed by Robbie Basho.

Side one
No.	Title	Length
1.	"Twilight Peaks"	3:40
2.	"Nice Enough for Love"	5:51
3.	"Afternoon and Evening"	4:00
4.	"Where Butterflies in Winter Go"	4:31

Side two
No.	Title	Length
1.	"Japan Idyll"	5:55
2.	"Camelot II"	6:14
3.	"Golden Dragon"	4:50
4.	"Lament for the Earth"	4:03

2012 remastered CD bonus tracks
No.	Title	Length
9.	"Kingdom of Love"	1:42
10.	"Twilight Peaks" (live)	4:38
11.	"Nice Enough for Love" (live)	7:06

== Personnel ==
Adapted from the Twilight Peaks liner notes.

- Robbie Basho – acoustic guitar, acoustic twelve-string guitar

== Release history ==
Region	Date	Label	Format	Catalog
United States	1984	Basho Productions	CS	
United States	1985	The Art of Relaxation, Vital Body	CS	9521
Belgium	2012	Smeraldina-Rima	CD, LP	20
