= Art of the Acoustic Steel String Guitar 6 & 12 =

Studio album by Robbie Basho
- Released: 1979
- Recorded: Studio C at The Annex, Menlo Park, CA
- Genre: American Primitivism
- Length: 50:56
- Label: Windham Hill
- Producer: William Ackerman

Robbie Basho chronology
Visions of the Country (1978)	Art of the Acoustic Steel String Guitar 6 & 12 (1979)	Rainbow Thunder: Songs of the American West (1981)

Professional ratings
Review scores
Source	Rating
All About Jazz	5/5 stars
AllMusic	2.5/5 stars
The Great Folk Discography	4/10
PopMatters	8/10 stars

Art of the Acoustic Steel String Guitar 6 & 12 is the eleventh studio album by composer and guitarist Robbie Basho, released in 1979 by Windham Hill Records. It was restored and remastered from the original master tapes by Joe Churchich and Kyle Fosburgh and re-issued by Grass-Tops Recording and Gnome Life Records on October 21, 2014.

== Track listing ==
All music is composed by Robbie Basho.

Side one
No.	Title	Length
1.	"The Grail and the Lotus"	6:36
2.	"Cathedrals et fleur de lis"	7:02
3.	"Pasha II"	6:33
4.	"A Study for Steel String"	3:00
5.	"Ackerman Special"	1:16
6.	"Apres Midi American"	1:56

Side two
No.	Title	Length
1.	"Variations on Grieg"	5:03
2.	"Scottish Rites"	4:38
3.	"Pavan India"	7:12
4.	"Variations on Ezumi"	4:04
5.	"Variations on Clair de lune"	3:36

== Personnel ==
Adapted from the Art of the Acoustic Steel String Guitar 6 & 12 liner notes.

- Robbie Basho – acoustic guitar, vocals
- William Ackerman – production
- Ron Cook – executive producer
- Ron May – cover art
- Dennis Reed – recording, mixing

== Release history ==
Region	Date	Label	Format	Catalog
United States	1979	Windham Hill	LP	WHS C-1010
Germany	1981	Pastels	LP	B-ST-2021
United States	1982	Lost Lake Arts	LP	LL-83
United States	2014	Grass-Tops Recording	CD	GTR-0018
United States	2014	Gnome Life	LP	GNM-029
