= Zarthus =

Studio album by Robbie Basho
- Released: 1974
- Genre: Folk
- Length: 45:20
- Label: Vanguard

Robbie Basho chronology
The Voice of the Eagle (1972)	Zarthus (1974)	Visions of the Country (1978)

Professional ratings
Review scores
Source	Rating
AllMusic	4/5 stars
The Great Folk Discography	7/10
Record Collector	3/5 stars
The Rolling Stone Record Guide	2/5 stars

Zarthus is the ninth studio album by composer and guitarist Robbie Basho, released in 1974 by Vanguard Records.

== Track listing ==
All music is composed by Robbie Basho.

Side one
No.	Title	Length
1.	"Zarthus"	2:57
2.	"Khoda é Gul é Abe"	9:34
3.	"Mehera"	2:23
4.	"Khalil Gibran"	6:59
5.	"Bride Divine"	3:31

Side two
No.	Title	Length
1.	"Rhapsody in Druz" (Main Theme/Wine Section/Flower of the Heart/The Flight/Nightingale/Darshan/Ocean Section/Allah Meher/Ships/Baba's Mountain/Look into Your Heart/March/Rolling Home)	19:56

== Personnel ==
Adapted from the Zarthus liner notes.

- Robbie Basho – acoustic guitar, acoustic twelve-string guitar, vocals, piano (B1)
- Ramnad Raghavan – mridangam (A1–A5)

== Release history ==
Region	Date	Label	Format	Catalog
United States	1974	Vanguard	LP	VSD 79339
Italy	2001	Comet	CD, LP	VSD 79339
United Kingdom	2014	Ace Vanguard Masters	CD	VSD 79339
