= Rainbow Thunder: Songs of the American West =

Studio album by Robbie Basho
- Released: 1981
- Recorded: Studio C, Palo Alto, California; Big and Famous Studio, Seattle, Washington
- Genre: American primitivism
- Label: Silver Label
- Producer: Robbie Basho, Greg Haverfield, Dennis Reed

Robbie Basho chronology
Art of the Acoustic Steel String Guitar 6 & 12 (1979)	Rainbow Thunder: Songs of the American West (1981)	Bouquet (1983)

Rainbow Thunder: Songs of the American West is the twelfth studio album by composer and guitarist Robbie Basho, released in 1981 by Silver Label Recording. It was restored and remastered by Joe Churchich, Kyle Fosburgh, and John Dark and re-issued by Grass-Tops Recording on September 23, 2015.

== Track listing ==
All music is composed by Robbie Basho.

Side one
No.	Title	Length
1.	"Redwood Ramble"	2:43
2.	"Crashing Thunder"	5:24
3.	"Moving Up A'Ways"	6:07
4.	"Legend Of Mount Tamalpias"	5:32
5.	"Rainbow Thunder"	6:48

Side two
No.	Title	Length
1.	"The Pathfinder"	3:33
2.	"The White Buffalo"	4:25
3.	"Bury My Heart at Wounded Knee"	3:21
4.	"Home Again"	3:57
5.	"The Long Lullaby"	5:36
6.	"Black Hills Soliloquy"	3:41

== Personnel ==
Adapted from the Rainbow Thunder: Songs of the American West liner notes.

- Robbie Basho – acoustic guitar, acoustic twelve-string guitar, vocals, production
- John DiLoreto – mixing
- Deborah Hopping – design
- Greg Haverfield – production
- Frank Porpat – cover art
- Dennis Reed – production

== Release history ==
Region	Date	Label	Format	Catalog
United States	1981	Silver Label Recording	LP	SLR-029
United States	2015	Grass-Tops Recording	CD	GTR-0023
