= The Voice of the Eagle =

Studio album by Robbie Basho
- Released: 1972
- Genre: Folk
- Length: 46:51
- Label: Vanguard
- Producer: Jack Lothrop

Robbie Basho chronology
Song of the Stallion (1971)	The Voice of the Eagle (1972)	Zarthus (1974)

Professional ratings
Review scores
Source	Rating
AllMusic	3/5 stars
The Great Folk Discography	5/10
The Rolling Stone Record Guide	2/5 stars
Uncut	4/5 stars

The Voice of the Eagle is the eighth studio album by composer and guitarist Robbie Basho, released in 1972 by Vanguard Records.

== Track listing ==
All music is composed by Robbie Basho.

Side one
No.	Title	Length
1.	"Voice of the Eagle"	7:18
2.	"Wounded Knee Soliloquy"	5:31
3.	"Blue Corn Serenade"	10:42

Side two
No.	Title	Length
1.	"Joseph"	5:20
2.	"Omaha Tribal Prayer"	3:34
3.	"Sweet Medicine"	4:50
4.	"Roses and Gold"	3:03
5.	"Moving Up a Ways"	6:33

== Personnel ==
Adapted from The Voice of the Eagle liner notes.

Musicians

- Robbie Basho – acoustic guitar, vocals
- Ramnad Raghavan – mridangam

Production and additional personnel

- Jack Lothrop – production
- Frank Porpot – cover art
- Jeff Zaraya – engineering

== Release history ==
Region	Date	Label	Format	Catalog
United States	1972	Vanguard	LP	VSD 79321
Italy	2001	Comet	CD, LP	VSD 79321
United Kingdom	2014	Ace Vanguard Masters	CD	VSD 79321
