= Big Daddy (Bukka White album) =

Studio album by Bukka White
- Released: 1974
- Genre: Blues
- Label: Biograph

Bukka White chronology
Baton Rouge Mosby Street (1972)	Big Daddy (1974)	Country Blues (1975)

Big Daddy is an album by the American blues musician Bukka White, released in 1974. It was White's final album. Big Daddy was reissued by Shout! Factory in 2004.

The album was nominated for a Grammy Award for best "Best Ethnic or Traditional Recording".

== Production ==
The album was recorded in Memphis, Tennessee, with White playing a National Triolian guitar.

== Critical reception ==
Professional ratings
Review scores
Source	Rating
AllMusic	3/5 stars
The Commercial Appeal	4/5 stars
The Encyclopedia of Popular Music	3/5 stars
MusicHound Blues: The Essential Album Guide	3.5/5 stars
The Penguin Guide to Blues Recordings	3/4 stars
The New Rolling Stone Record Guide	3/5 stars

Billboard called Big Daddy "both nostalgic and refreshing."

AllMusic thought that "White conjures up in the studio the essence of the revival sound: a man, a guitar, and an authentic delivery." The Commercial Appeal wrote: "Slide master White ... manhandled his guitar, a force of nature that was akin to watching a dam break and the flood of blues run wild. His singing, even at this, his final session, matched every defiant, plucked note."

The Day deemed the album "genuine and powerful," and named the reissue one of the best albums of 2004. The New Rolling Stone Record Guide called it "an important source of delta styles," writing that "White did have a powerful bottleneck style."

== Track listing ==
No.	Title	Length
1.	"Black Cat Bone Blues"	3:07
2.	"1936 Triggertoe"	2:33
3.	"Cryin' Holy Unto the Lord"	3:02
4.	"Shake My Hand Blues"	3:29
5.	"Sic 'Em Dogs On"	3:18
6.	"Gibson Hill"	4:36
7.	"Mama Don' 'Low"	3:27
8.	"Hot Springs Arkansas"	3:03
9.	"Jelly Roll Workin' Man"	4:19
10.	"Black Crepe Blues"	2:56
11.	"Glory Bound Train"	3:09
12.	"Aberdeen Mississippi Blues"	3:02
