= Bouquet (Robbie Basho album) =

Studio album by Robbie Basho
- Released: 1983
- Genre: American Primitivism
- Length: 51:40
- Label: Basho

Robbie Basho chronology
Rainbow Thunder: Songs of the American West (1981)	Bouquet (1983)	Twilight Peaks (1984)

Bouquet is the thirteenth studio album by composer and guitarist Robbie Basho, released independently in 1983 by Basho Productions.

== Track listing ==
All music is composed by Robbie Basho.

Side one
No.	Title	Length
1.	"The Golden Medallion"	4:27
2.	"Khalil Gibran"	4:43
3.	"The White Swallow"	3:42
4.	"The Polish Rider"	2:37
5.	"El Cid"	5:57

Side two
No.	Title	Length
1.	"Lightening Thunder"	5:51
2.	"Land of Our Fathers"	3:41
3.	"Tears of Teresa"	8:23
4.	"Blues From Lebanon"	2:27
5.	"The Song of Leila"	7:00
6.	"The White Princess"	2:53

== Personnel ==
Adapted from the Bouquet liner notes.

- Robbie Basho – acoustic guitar, vocals, acoustic twelve-string guitar (B2), piano (B6)
- Consortium of the Arts Choir – vocals (B2)

== Release history ==
Region	Date	Label	Format
United States	1983	Basho Productions	CS
