= Song of the Stallion =

Studio album by Robbie Basho
- Released: 1971
- Recorded: 1968
- Studio: Sierra Sound, Berkeley, CA
- Genre: Folk
- Length: 45:26
- Label: Takoma
- Producer: Ed Bogus, Bob DeSousa

Robbie Basho chronology
Venus in Cancer (1969)	Song of the Stallion (1971)	The Voice of the Eagle (1972)

Professional ratings
Review scores
Source	Rating
AllMusic	3/5 stars
Billboard	4/5 stars
The Great Folk Discography	6/10

Song of the Stallion is the seventh studio album by composer and guitarist Robbie Basho, released in 1971 by Takoma Records.

== Track listing ==
All music is composed by Robbie Basho.

Side one
No.	Title	Length
1.	"Song of the Stallion"	4:59
2.	"A North American Raga (The Plumstar)"	11:18
3.	"The Lady She Is Waiting"	5:01

Side two
No.	Title	Length
1.	"Roses and Snow"	7:42
2.	"California Raga"	9:11
3.	"The Hajj"	5:12
4.	"Khatum"	2:03

== Personnel ==
Adapted from the Song of the Stallion liner notes.

Musicians

- Robbie Basho – steel-string acoustic guitar, vocals
- William Wright – tabla

Production and additional personnel

- Ed Bogus – production
- Bob DeSousa – engineering, production
- Nancy Donald – design, photography

== Release history ==
Region	Date	Label	Format	Catalog
United States	1971	Takoma	LP	C-1031
