= Memphis Defense Depot =

Decommissioned United States Army supply depot in Memphis, Tennessee

Coordinates: 35°5′11.79″N 89°59′52.58″W

The Memphis Defense Depot is a decommissioned United States Army supply depot located on 642 acres (260 ha) in Memphis, Tennessee. It operated as a military depot from 1942 until 1997.

== History ==
Operations at the depot began in January 1942, when the U.S. Army Corps of Engineers officially activated the site as the Memphis General Depot. The depot provided supplies including clothing, food, medical supplies, electronic equipment, petroleum products, and industrial chemicals. It had 130 buildings and over 4,000,000 square feet (370,000 m^{2}) of indoor storage.

Eventually, the disposal of chemicals began at the site. This included the disposal of leaking mustard bombs at Dunn Field, a field located on the property. From 1942 until 1962 the installation performed Army supply and was known variously as the Memphis Quartermaster Depot, Memphis Army Service Forces Depot, and the Memphis General Depot.

In 1992, the 632-acre base was placed on the list of Superfund sites maintained by the Environmental Protection Agency (EPA) because "chemicals from the wastes that were released on site resulted in contaminated soil, groundwater, surface water, and sediment." According to the EPA, significant cleanup has been achieved.

In 1995, the depot was placed on the closure list of the 1995 Base Realignment and Closure Commission and on September 30, 1997, it was closed. Since that year, 94% of the facilities have been returned to public use. Part of the depot has also been reused as the Memphis Depot Business Park.
