= Nedick's =

American fast food chain

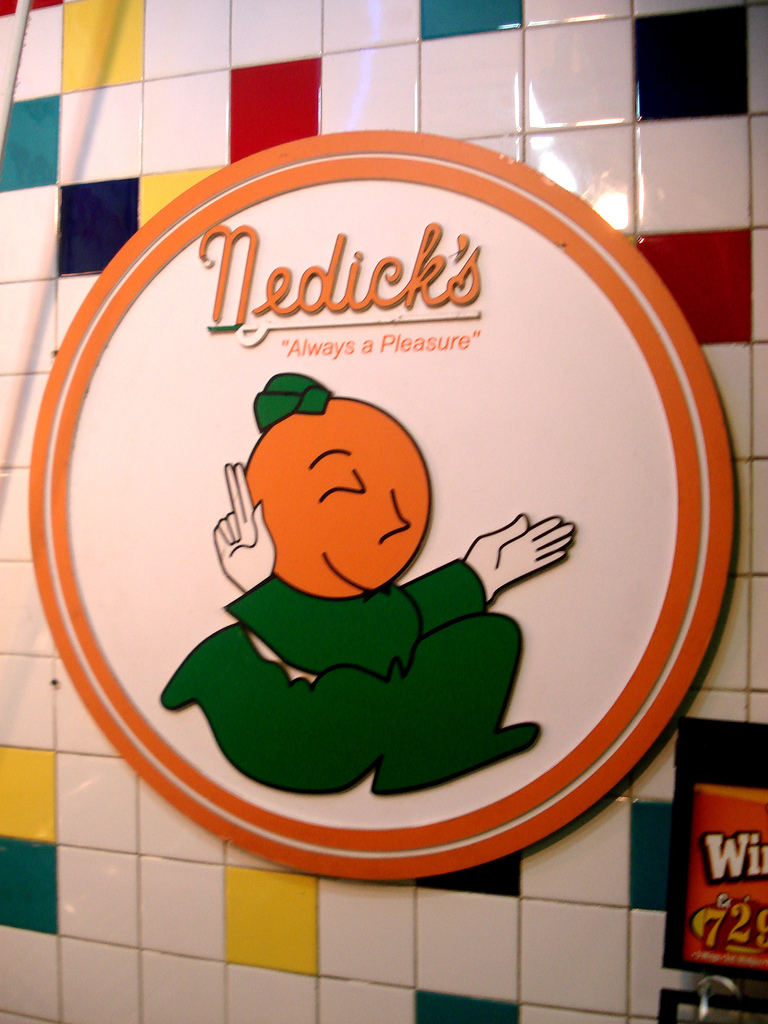
- Nedick's logo
- Industry: Restaurant
- Genre: Fast food restaurant
- Predecessor: Nedick's Orange Juice Company
- Founded: 1913 in New York City, New York, United States
- Founders: Robert T. Neely; Orville A. Dickinson
- Defunct: 1980s
- Fate: Defunct
- Successor: Nedick's in 2003 (now defunct)
- Area served: Northeast United States

Nedick's was an American chain of fast-food restaurants that originated in New York City in 1913. The name of the chain was formed from the last names of Robert T. Neely and Orville A. Dickinson, who founded the chain with the original stand in a hotel storefront of the Bartholdi Hotel at 23rd Street and Broadway in Manhattan.

During the 1950s the chain expanded to the Newark, New Jersey; Albany, New York; Boston, Massachusetts, Philadelphia, Pennsylvania; Baltimore, Maryland; and Washington, D.C. areas. Originally known for making and selling a signature orange drink, Nedick's expanded its menu through the years. Coffee, doughnuts and hot dogs, with a unique mustard relish in a toasted bun, were added to the Nedick's menu. The chain became known for the orange with white decor of its locations as well as the slogans "Good food is never expensive at Nedick's" and "Always a pleasure".

Following intense competition in the 1970s from national chains including McDonald's and Dunkin' Donuts, and criticism in 1981 for the quality of its concession at the Central Park Zoo, Nedick's ceased operations. An attempt was made in 2003 to revive the chain by new owners who had purchased the rights to use the Nedick's name. Three locations were opened in New York City during 2003 but were closed after operating for a number of years.

An article in The New York Times once referred to the Nedick's chain as "The Starbucks of New York".

== History ==
The Nedick's chain was founded by Robert T. Neely, a real estate investor, and Orville A. Dickinson, who operated a store in the Bartholdi Hotel located at 23rd Street and Broadway, in 1913. The original Nedick's stand opened in a hotel storefront at the Bartholdi Hotel. Nedick's business plan was modeled after an Atlantic City juice stand named Clements. Growing from one location they expanded to 13 locations by 1917. In 1924 it was reported that the Nedick's Corporation had signed a 21-year lease, at an aggregate cost of $1,000,000, for three locations in Coney Island with one located on the Coney Island Boardwalk. By 1927 Nedick's had expanded to 135 locations and reported serving 25,000,000 customers annually with a gross profit of $2,500,000. Two-thirds of Nedick's sales were from their orange drink and in 1928 plans were made to operate a bottling plant for this beverage. In later years Nedick's orange drink was advertised for sale at a large number of retail outlets. Hot lunches were added to the Nedick's menu beginning in 1930. The Great Depression took a toll on the Nedick's chain and by 1934 only 40 locations remained. Robert Neely, the sole remaining owner, lost control of the company when a group of investors purchased the assets of Nedick's, at auction, for $48,000 on April 11, 1934.

The new owners of Nedick's worked aggressively to rebuild the brand and began using radio advertising that touted the health benefits of vitamin B1 that was being added to the traditional Nedick's orange drink. Some of the new radio commercials for the Nedick's chain featuring a character called "Little Nick". A loss leader breakfast was offered in order to bring in customers and it was hoped that this would increase business throughout the day. Within a five-year period, from 1941 to 1946, sales numbers at Nedick's tripled. In 1948 it was advertised that a carbonated version of the Nedick's orange drink was to be sold only through independent retailers.

In 1953, Nedick's, with 75 locations, began running a contest in which customers could enter to win daily prizes ranging from $1–$25 at each location and a monthly drawing where one Nedick's customer would win a mink coat. During this time Nedick's also offered advertising token coins, included in packages of cigarettes that were sold at Nedick's, that could be used for purchasing products at their locations before the expiration date stamped on the token.

After the then 83-store chain was acquired in May 1965 by the ABC Consolidated Corporation, plans were announced to expand and modernize with a goal of making Nedick's a national chain. Nedick's was a sponsor of the New York Knicks basketball team, which gave rise to the catchphrase of the Knicks' long-time radio announcer, Marty Glickman: "Good like Nedick's", intoned after the team scored a basket. Another common phrase was "Meet me outside Nedick's", as the well-known and highly visible locations were very familiar for people to rendezvous. Nedick's had a location on 8th Avenue in Madison Square Garden, the Knicks' arena until 1968.

Following intense competition in the 1970s from such national chains as McDonald's and Dunkin' Donuts, and criticism in 1981 for the quality of its concession at the Central Park Zoo, Nedick's ceased operations during the 1980s.

=== Revival of brand name ===
In 2001, the Riese Organization, which operated a number of Dunkin' Donuts and Pizza Hut locations, sought to revive the Nedick's brand and purchased the rights for the Nedick's name. Three Nedick's locations were opened in New York City in 2003 at Penn Station, 1286 Broadway and 416 8th Avenue. These new locations featured an expanded menu from the original Nedick's stores and it was reported that research was done on Nedick's history to make the dining experience as close as possible to the original, but it was admitted that most of the information obtained was anecdotal. All locations have since closed and Nedick's is no longer featured on Riese Restaurants webpage.
