= Max Ochs =

American guitarist

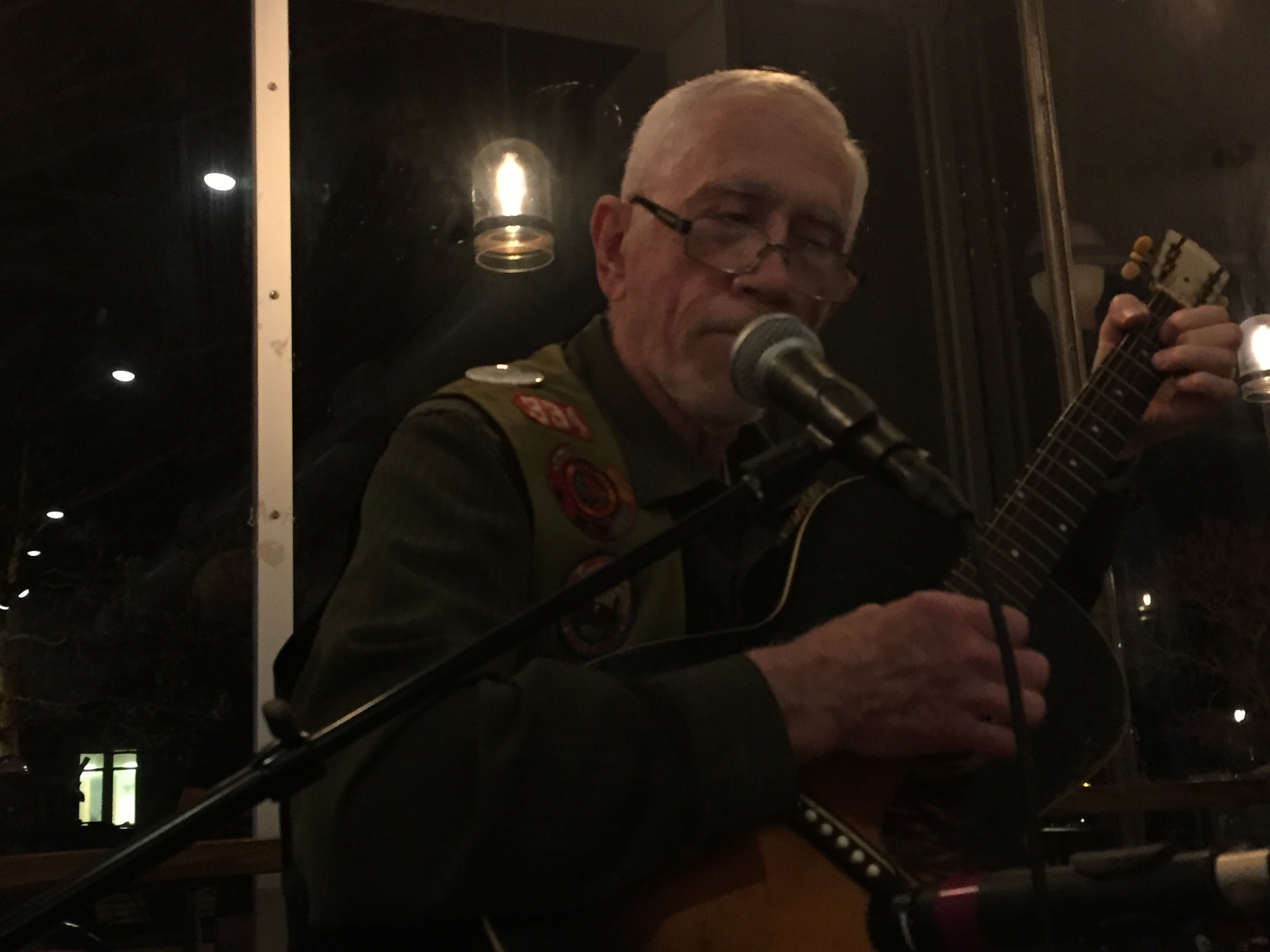
Max Ochs performing live at the Thousand Incarnations of the Rose Music Festival, Takoma Park, MD. Friday, April 13, 2018.

Max Ochs (born Maxwell David Ochs; born December 31, 1940, in Queens, New York) is a fingerstyle acoustic guitarist and folklorist who recorded for Takoma Records among other labels.

== Biography ==
His family moved to Annapolis, Maryland in 1945, where Ochs spent his adolescence. His friendship and association with guitarist John Fahey led to many music collaborations, including that of Mississippi John Hurt who spent weeks teaching Ochs older picking styles.

After attending high school in Annapolis, Ochs studied at the University of Maryland, College Park where he became friends with Ed Denson in a creative writing class. Denson, along with John Fahey, went on to form Takoma Records in Berkeley, California in 1963. Without a degree, Ochs left University of Maryland and moved to New York City where he lived from 1961 to 1965. During his time in New York, he collaborated with Buzzy Linhart and was a founding member of the folk-raga group, the Seventh Sons. After leaving New York and heading west in 1965, Ochs was invited to appear with fellow University of Maryland student and fingerstyle guitarist Robbie Basho, as well as John Fahey and Harry Taussig on a Takoma Records release titled Contemporary Guitar. The LP presents a collection of fingerstyle guitar songs often performed in a subtle and sometimes improvised manner. Ochs returned to College Park and received his degree in 1970.

Legendary folk singer Phil Ochs (1940-1976) was a cousin of Max.

Now based in Severna Park, Maryland, Ochs continues to perform, write and record songs in an early folk and blues tradition. He was the curator of the folk music series at 333 Coffeehouse in Annapolis for over a decade.

== Discography ==
- Various Artists: Contemporary Guitar (Takoma, 1967)
- “Imaginational Anthem”/”Oncones“ 45 (Fonotone, 2005, recorded in 1969)
- Letter to the Editor (Big Ear, 2000)
- Imaginational Anthem LP (Near Mint/Tompkins Square, 2004)
- Got these Blues with Neil Harpe (PPG, 2007)
- Hooray for Another Day (Tompkins Square, 2008)
- The Music Of Harry Taussig & Max Ochs (Tompkins Square, 2017)
