= Robbie Basho =

American musician (1940-1986)

Background information
- Born: Daniel R. Robinson Jr. August 31, 1940; Baltimore, Maryland, U.S.
- Died: February 1986 (aged 45) Berkeley, California, U.S.
- Genres: Folk, American primitive guitar, experimental
- Occupation: Musician
- Instrument: Guitar/Piano
- Years active: 1965–1986
- Labels: Takoma, Blue Thumb, Vanguard, Windham Hill, Tompkins Square

Robbie Basho (earlier name Daniel R. Robinson, Jr.; August 31, 1940 – February 1986) was an American acoustic guitarist, pianist and singer.

== Biography ==
Basho was born in Baltimore on August 31, 1940, and was orphaned as an infant. Adopted by the Robinson family, Daniel Robinson, Jr. attended Catholic schools in the Archdiocese of Baltimore and was prepared for college at St. James School, Maryland, an Episcopal school. He went on to study at University of Maryland, College Park. Although he played the euphonium in the high school band and sang in middle school and high school ensembles, his interest in acoustic guitar grew during his college years, as a direct result of his friendships with fellow students John Fahey, Ed Denson, and Max Ochs. In 1959, Basho purchased his first guitar and immersed himself in Asian art and culture. It was around this time that he changed his name to Basho, in honor of the Japanese poet, Matsuo Bashō.

Basho saw the steel string guitar as a concert instrument, and wanted to create a raga system for America. During a radio interview in 1974, promoting his album Zarthus, Basho discussed his music in detail. He described how he had gone through a number of "periods" related to philosophy and music, including Japanese, Hindu, Iranian and Native American. Zarthus represented the culmination of his "Persian period". Basho asserted his wish, along with John Fahey and Leo Kottke, to raise the steel-string guitar to the level of a concert instrument. He acknowledged that the nylon-string guitar was suitable for "love songs", but its steel counterpart could communicate "fire".

Basho credited his interest in Indian music to hearing Ravi Shankar, whom he first encountered in 1962.

Basho died unexpectedly at the age of 45 due to an accident during a visit to his chiropractor, where an "intentional whiplash" procedure caused blood vessels in his neck to rupture, leading to a fatal stroke. His date of death is reported variously as February 18 or 28, 1986.

== Guitar style ==
Robbie Basho's finger-picked guitar technique was influenced heavily by sarod playing, and his studies with the Indian virtuoso Ali Akbar Khan. Basho used unusual open tunings, including a number of variants on "open-C" (CGCGCE), and played a 12-string guitar to recreate the drone that is characteristic of Indian classical music. Basho often used Eastern modes and scales, but other influences include European classical music, blues (in his earlier period), and ballad styles of the U.S.

== Renewal of interest ==
In the 1970s and 1980s, Basho's contribution to acoustic steel string guitar was eclipsed early by John Fahey, founder of Takoma Records, and the appearance of Windham Hill Records and its roster of musicians.

Yet, there has been a renewal of interest in his work since 2000, spurred on by reissues by Takoma, Tompkins Square, and Grass-Tops Recording, previously unpublished concerts and a 2015 documentary film from British filmmaker Liam Barker,Voice of the Eagle: The Enigma of Robbie Basho.

British filmmaker Liam Barker premiered the documentary Voice of the Eagle: The Enigma of Robbie Basho in London in October 2015 at the Raindance Festival and the film premiered at San Francisco's Roxie Theater in April 2018. It was nominated for the Jury Award at the Santa Barbara International Film Festival. The documentary traces the troubled life of Basho with previously uncovered archive material and interviews with Pete Townshend, William Ackerman, Alex de Grassi, Henry Kaiser, Glenn Jones, Country Joe McDonald, Jon Monday, Steffen Basho-Junghans and Max Ochs.

While researching the film, Barker uncovered a trove of unreleased reel-to-reel tapes, resulting in Tompkin Square's five-disc set of unreleased music: Song of the Avatars: The Lost Master Tapes (2020).

Grass-Tops inherited tapes that had been preserved for 30 years by guitarist Glenn Jones.

Buck Curran of psychedelic folk band Arborea has curated two Robbie Basho tribute albums, We Are All One in the Sun (2010) and Basket Full of Dragons (2016). Both albums feature contemporary artists reinterpreting Basho's material and original compositions inspired by his style.

== Discography ==
Studio albums

- The Seal of the Blue Lotus (Takoma, 1965)
- The Grail & the Lotus (Takoma, 1966)
- Basho Sings (Takoma, 1967)
- The Falconer's Arm I (Takoma, 1967)
- The Falconer's Arm II (Takoma, 1967)
- Venus in Cancer (Blue Thumb, 1969) remastered and reissued by Tompkins Square
- Song of the Stallion (Takoma, 1971)
- The Voice of the Eagle (Vanguard, 1972)
- Zarthus (Vanguard, 1974)
- Visions of the Country (Windham Hill, 1978)
- Art of the Acoustic Steel String Guitar 6 & 12 (Windham Hill, 1979)
- Rainbow Thunder: Songs of the American West (Silver Label, 1981)
- Bouquet (Basho Productions, 1983)
- Twilight Peaks (Art of Relaxation, 1984)
- Songs of the Great Mystery (Real Gone, 2020) some tracks were released for a short period of time in 2007 as Indian II

Live albums

- Bonn ist Supreme (Bo'Weavil, 2008)
- Art of the Acoustic Steel String Preview (Grass-Tops, 2014)
- Robbie Basho Live in Milwaukee – 1982 (Grass-Tops, 2015)
- Portrait of Basho as a Young Dragoon (Grass-Tops, 2015)
- Rocky Mountain Raga - Live from Elgin - 1981 (Grass-Tops, 2016)
- Robbie Basho Live at Folkstudio – 1982 (Grass-Tops, 2016)
- Robbie Basho Live in Forlì - 1982 (Topa Topa, 2016)
- Robbie Basho - Live in Forli, Italy 1982 Complete Concert (ESP-Disk'/Obsolete Recordings, 2017)

Compilation albums

- Basho's Best, Vol. 1 (Basho, 1982)
- Guitar Soli (Takoma, 1996)
- Băshovia (Takoma, 2001)
- Song of the Avatars: The Lost Master Tapes (Tompkins Square, 2020)
