= Karen Dalton =

American musician (1937–1993)

Background information
- Born: Karen J. Cariker; July 19, 1937; Bonham, Texas, U.S.
- Died: March 19, 1993 (aged 55) Hurley, New York, U.S.
- Genres: Country blues; folk
- Occupations: Vocalist; guitarist; banjoist
- Instruments: Vocals; guitar; banjo
- Years active: 1960s–1990s

Karen J. Dalton (born Jean Karen Cariker; July 19, 1937 – March 19, 1993) was an American country blues singer, guitarist, and banjo player. She was associated with the early 1960s Greenwich Village folk music scene, particularly with Fred Neil, the Holy Modal Rounders, and Bob Dylan. Although she did not enjoy much commercial success during her lifetime, her music has gained significant recognition since her death. Artists like Nick Cave, Devendra Banhart, and Joanna Newsom have noted her as an influence.

== Life and career ==
Dalton was born Jean Karen Cariker in Bonham, Texas, but was raised in Enid, Oklahoma. She also lived in Stillwater, Oklahoma, and Lawrence, Kansas. With two divorces behind her at the age of 21, Dalton left Oklahoma and arrived in Greenwich Village, New York City, in the early 1960s. She brought her twelve string guitar, long-neck banjo, and at least one of her two children with her. According to her daughter Abralyn Baird, at that point Dalton had lost two of her bottom teeth while breaking up a fight between two of her boyfriends.

=== Greenwich Village scene ===
Dalton quickly became entrenched in the Greenwich Village folk musical scene of the 1960s. She played alongside big names of the time, including Bob Dylan (who occasionally backed her on harmonica), Fred Neil, Richard Tucker, and Tim Hardin. She covered many of their songs in her own performances. Dylan later wrote that "Karen had a voice like Billie Holiday and played guitar like Jimmy Reed." She was among the first to sing Hardin's "Reason to Believe". She later married Tucker, with whom she sometimes played as a duo, and in a trio with Hardin.

While Dalton was a regular at famous folk venue Café Wha? and performed at benefit concerts for civil rights groups, she was a reluctant performer who refused to sing her own songs and who used alcohol and heroin, which made recording and touring even more difficult.

Dalton moved to Colorado with husband Richard Tucker and daughter Abralyn (Abbe) and lived there for a while in the 1960s, in a small mining cabin in Summerville. Eventually she moved back to New York via Los Angeles, and then to Woodstock, New York.

=== It's So Hard to Tell Who's Going to Love You the Best (album) ===
Dalton was "not interested in playing the music industry's games in an era when musicians had little other choice," as bass player and producer Harvey Brooks noted. She often responded in anger when producers attempted to change her music while recording.

At first, producer Nick Venet was unsuccessful in recording her first album, It's So Hard to Tell Who's Going to Love You the Best (Capitol, 1969). It was not until he invited Fred Neil to a session that they were able to come away with recordings. Even then, Venet and Neil were only successful by tricking Dalton into thinking the tape was not rolling. Dalton cut most of the tracks with one take, and all in one night. The record features songs from Neil, Hardin, Jelly Roll Morton, and Eddie Floyd and Booker T. Jones. It was re-released by Koch Records on CD in 1996.

=== In My Own Time (album) ===
Dalton's second album, In My Own Time (1971), was recorded at Bearsville Studios (which was set up by Bob Dylan's manager, Albert Grossman) and originally released by Woodstock Festival promoter Michael Lang's label, Just Sunshine Records. The album was produced and arranged by Harvey Brooks, who played bass on it. Piano player Richard Bell guested on the album. Its liner notes were written by Fred Neil and its cover photos were taken by Elliott Landy. Dalton brought her two teenage children, her dog, and her horse from Oklahoma to feel more at ease with recording.

=== Re-releases and tributes ===
It's So Hard to Tell Who's Going to Love You the Best was re-released on Koch Records in 1997, in collaboration with New York-based radio DJ and Karen Dalton fan Nicholas Hill, and with liner notes by Peter Stampfel. In 1999, the French label Megaphone music did a European re-release of the same album, which included a bonus DVD featuring rare performance footage of Dalton and a French TV feature on Karen Dalton from 1970. In My Own Time was re-released on CD and LP on November 7, 2006, by Light in the Attic Records.

Two recordings from 1962 and 1963, previously owned by Karen's friend Joe Loop who ran the little club "The Attic" in Boulder in the early 1960s, were released on Megaphone in 2007 and 2008 as live album Cotton Eyed Joe and the home-recorded album Green Rocky Road.

The compilation tribute album, Remembering Mountains: Unheard Songs by Karen Dalton, was released in 2015 by folk label Tompkins Square. In similar fashion to Wilco and Billy Bragg's adaptions of Woody Guthrie songs in Mermaid Avenue, the album features adaptations of Dalton's work by artists including Patty Griffin, Lucinda Williams, Josephine Foster, Sharon Van Etten, and Julia Holter. The songs feature lyrics and poems Dalton wrote before her death, which were in the care of her friend, folk guitarist Peter Walker.

== Style ==
Dalton's bluesy, world-weary voice is often compared to jazz singer Billie Holiday, though Dalton loathed the comparison and said Bessie Smith was a greater influence. Dalton sang blues, folk, country, pop, Motown—making over each song in her own style. She played the twelve string guitar and a long-neck banjo.

Known as "the folk singer's answer to Billie Holiday" and "Sweet Mother K.D.", Dalton is said to be the subject of the song "Katie's Been Gone" (composed by Richard Manuel and Robbie Robertson) on the album The Basement Tapes by The Band and Bob Dylan, who wrote of Dalton that "My favorite singer...was Karen Dalton. Karen had a voice like Billie Holiday and played guitar like Jimmy Reed... I sang with her a couple of times." Fred Neil once remarked, "She sure can sing the shit out of the blues."

Modern artists Adele, Nick Cave, Devendra Banhart, and Joanna Newsom have all noted her as an influence. Country singer Lacy J. Dalton, who knew Dalton in Greenwich Village, adopted her surname as a tribute.

== Later life and death ==
Commercial failure of her album In My Own Time and her estrangement from her children contributed to further substance abuse later in Dalton's life.

In later years, Dalton lived in a mobile home located in a clearing off Eagle's Nest Road, outside the town of Hurley, near Woodstock.

Friend Lacy J. Dalton helped send her to rehab in Texas in the early 1990s, a stay which lasted only a couple of days before she demanded to be taken back home to Woodstock. She died there in March 1993 from an AIDS-related illness, aged 55. According to her friend Peter Walker, she had been living with the disease for more than eight years.

== Documentary ==
A documentary, Karen Dalton: In My Own Time, from filmmakers Richard Peete and Robert Yapkowitz, made its world premiere at Doc NYC in November 2020. Sheri Linden in The Hollywood Reporter writes: "As it introduces a one-of-a-kind artist to the uninitiated and celebrates her for aficionados, above all it listens — and invites us to do the same."

== Discography ==
=== Studio albums ===
- It's So Hard to Tell Who's Going to Love You the Best (1969)
- In My Own Time (1971)

=== Live album ===
- Cotton Eyed Joe (2007) (recorded live in 1962)

=== Other releases ===
- Green Rocky Road (2008) Recorded at home circa 1962–63, released by Delmore Recording Society; contains unreleased recordings.
- 1966 (2012). Released by Delmore Recording Society; contains previously unreleased recordings.
- Remembering Mountains: Unheard Songs by Karen Dalton (2015), released by Tompkins Square.
- Shuckin' Sugar (2022) Recorded live circa 1963, released by Delmore Recording Society; contains unreleased recordings.
