= ED Denson =

American record label owner, and lawyer (1940–2024)

- Born: Eugene Denson; March 3, 1940; Washington D.C., United States
- Died: April 12, 2024 (aged 84) Alderpoint, California
- Occupations: Music group manager, record producer, record label owner, lawyer

Eugene "ED" Denson (Note: The capitalization of both letters in his "first name" is his own spelling that evolved from constantly using his initials.) (March 3, 1940 – April 12, 2024) was an American music executive, producer, and attorney who made notable contributions to folk, blues, and early San Francisco rock.

== Biography ==
Denson was born in Washington, D.C., in 1940. His parents were civil servants, and he has one sister. Denson was educated in the public schools, except for one year at Fishburne Military School. While attending the University of Maryland, in College Park, intending to study physics, he became interested in folk music and learned much from the record collector Dick Spottswood. He met John Fahey, Robbie Basho, and Max Ochs—all folk guitarists. He then studied English, first at Merritt College, then at the Berkeley campus of the University of California.

=== Music career ===
Around 1963, in the wake of Fahey's location of Bukka White, Denson and John Fahey set up Takoma Records with Norman Pierce as their first distributor. The label was a pioneer of what was to become the Indie records movement. Denson produced one or two of Fahey's early albums for the label, and by getting Tom Weller to design psychedelic covers for them helped shape John's early image. He brought Robbie Basho to the label. In the early 1960s, he was the road manager for the Blues Project and then for Mississippi John Hurt, helped manage and produce records of Bukka White, and Skip James, after Fahey located White and James was found by a folklorist in Mississippi. He sold his interest in Takoma records to Fahey in the mid-1960s.

In the mid-1960s, Denson expanded his management activities into rock and, with Country Joe McDonald, published a magazine, Rag Baby. He was also music columnist for the Berkeley Barb in this period. As a founder of the University's Pretentious Folk Front he produced a concert featuring Allen Ginsberg and the Fugs. From around 1965 to 1970 he managed Country Joe & the Fish and Joy of Cooking. In 1972, Denson and Stefan Grossman founded and managed Kicking Mule Records, which at first released acoustic guitar instrumentals with tablature and later branched out to include artists such as John Renbourn, Michael Bloomfield, and Charlie Musselwhite. Denson has been involved in radio work since the 1960s, when he and Michael Sunday produced a late-night show on KPFA in Berkeley. Since 1982, he has hosted folk and blues radio shows, first on station KERG, in Redway, California, and then briefly on KHSU at Humboldt State University in Arcata, and, since shortly after it went on-air, KMUD, in Garberville. His show is streamed on kmud.org Saturday mornings 10:00–12:00 am, Pacific time. At 25 songs per show, he estimated he had played over 47,000 tunes as of late 2020.

During the 1970s, Denson spent several summers as a volunteer river guide with Bill McGinnis's Whitewater Voyages, primarily working with inflatable kayaks. He was a guide on the South Fork of the American and Klamath rivers usually, and on one Klamath trip met Mary Alice Sexton, who later became his third wife. In the summer of 1980 they ran the Grand Canyon on a month-long private trip with Bill McGinnis and two other guides.

He and Mary Alice moved to Humboldt County in 1980 and for 15 years operated Kicking Mule records from the barn on their ranch. After dividing the masters with his partner, Stefan Grossman, in 1995, he sold the remaining masters and the label to Fantasy Records.

=== Legal and political work ===
In the mid-1980s Denson became involved in the civil rights movement occasioned by the government's Campaign Against Marijuana Planting (CAMP) and the marijuana eradication raids in southern Humboldt County. He was president of the Civil Liberties Monitoring Project (CLMP) for many years, and became a nonviolence preparer for the Citizens Observation Group (COG). In that capacity he travelled extensively in southern Humboldt County, training over 200 people in nonviolent techniques to use while monitoring police activity during marijuana raids. In 1990 after extensive litigation by CLMP, the government signed a consent decree to alter their raiding techniques, thanks in large part to the advocacy of Ron Sinoway and Mel Pearlston.

In 1992, Denson ran for Humboldt County supervisor, but came in fourth in a field of eight. In 1995, he enrolled in William Howard Taft University's Taft Law School, a distance learning institution, from which he graduated in January 1999. He passed the California Bar Exam that month and in August 1999 was sworn in as an attorney. His practice for the first 16 years had been focused on defense of people charged with marijuana crimes or driving under the influence of alcohol or drugs. He has also represented, pro bono, activists arrested during protests of logging practices in the old-growth redwoods and, more recently, protesting the environmental impacts of the Willits bypass construction on US Highway 101.

He gave public lectures on California's medical marijuana law to patients and their caregivers, and for CalNORML; and hosts a monthly hour-long talk show on the topic on KMUD, a community radio station in Humboldt County, California. In 2006, he went to China as part of a Global Volunteers program and gave lectures on the American legal system to university students in Xi'an. In 2016, as cannabis law changed, relatively few cannabis arrests were made locally, and his law practice shifted from primarily criminal defense to counseling people who wanted Commercial Cannabis Cultivation permits under the Humboldt county ordinance. Perhaps 70-75 of his clients beat the December 31, 2016, deadline for applications to be filed. In 2017 he and Fred Fletcher filed a suit against Humboldt County alleging illegal changes to the county's marijuana tax law. The Court of Appeals ruled in their favor in 2020.

On Friday afternoon, April 12, 2024, Denison died at his home in Alderpoint, California, according to his wife Mary Alice Denson.

== Personal life ==
In the late 1960s, Denson and his first wife Patricia Sullivan married in 1963 before moving to California. They divorced shortly thereafter and Denson remarried.
