= Takoma Records =

Independent record label founded by John Fahey

- Parent company: Concord Bicycle Music
- Founded: 1959
- Founder: John Fahey; Eugene Denson; Norman Pierce
- Distributors: Concord Records; Universal Music Group
- Genre: Folk
- Country of origin: U.S.
- Official website: acerecords.co.uk/takoma-label

Takoma Records was a small but influential record label founded by guitarist John Fahey in the late 1950s. It was named after Fahey's hometown, Takoma Park, Maryland, a suburb of Washington, DC.

== History ==
Takoma Records began with a custom pressing of 100 copies of John Fahey/Blind Joe Death, an album of Fahey's fingerstyle guitar playing released around 1959. Fahey had no distribution and sold the pressing to friends and at music parties. A copy of this record sold on eBay for several thousand dollars.

Fahey moved to Berkeley, California. He rediscovered the country bluesman Bukka White. With Eugene "ED" Denson, Fahey drove to Memphis, Tennessee, and the pair produced White's first recording in 23 years. It was released in 1963 along with Fahey's second album.

Takoma expanded to include other guitarists, such as Robbie Basho, and other types of folk music. The compilation Contemporary Guitar was recorded in 1966 and featured Fahey, Basho, White, Max Ochs, and Harry Taussig. It demonstrated Fahey's interest in diverse guitar styles, from plantation blues to raga. Although at the same time Takoma released the avant-garde album The Psychedelic Saxophone of Charlie Nothing, its concentration was on acoustic guitar music, especially Fahey's.

Fahey started a genre of guitar music known later as American primitive guitar in which he applied traditional fingerpicking to neoclassical compositions. Takoma's musicians using this technique included Leo Kottke, Peter Lang, Rick Ruskin, Mike Auldridge, Robbie Basho, and Max Ochs. The label also produced records by New Age pianist George Winston, Mike Bloomfield, and electronic musician Joseph Byrd.

When Denson became manager of the rock band Country Joe and the Fish, Fahey became the sole owner of Takoma. He moved the label to Los Angeles where he was studying for his master's degree at UCLA under D.K. Wilgus. The album 6- and 12-String Guitar by Leo Kottke was a surprise hit, and the profit funded an expansion of the label, which now had a staff.

In 1970 Jon Monday joined the label as promotion manager, eventually becoming general manager. The label grew as radio stations played new releases by Fahey and other Takoma artists. In 1973 Charlie Mitchell became Takoma's president. Takoma was one of the founding companies of the National Association of Independent Record Distributors (NAIRD).

== Sale ==
In 1979 Fahey sold Takoma to Chrysalis Records, a company owned by Terry Ellis and Chris Wright which produced Blondie, Pat Benatar, and Huey Lewis. During the Chrysalis years, Takoma released albums by The Fabulous Thunderbirds, Canned Heat, and T-Bone Burnett. Jon Monday was general manager until 1982, when Chrysalis sold the Takoma catalogue. It was sold to American company Essex Entertainment. It was later bought by Fantasy Records in 1995. In 2004 Fantasy was purchased by the Concord Music Group. The Takoma Records label is now controlled by Concord in the US and licensed to Ace Records.

Takoma's bestselling album was Kottke's 6- and 12-String Guitar, often called "The Armadillo Album" because of the cover art. Another influential album was the 1974 Leo Kottke, Peter Lang & John Fahey.

ED Denson co-founded and managed Kicking Mule Records, which also featured acoustic guitarists. In 1995 he left the music business and became a criminal defense lawyer. Robbie Basho died in 1986, John Fahey in 2001, and Charlie Nothing died of cancer on October 23, 2007.

== See also ==
- List of record labels
