= Jimmy "Duck" Holmes =

American blues musician (born 1947)

- Born: Jimmy Charles Holmes; July 28, 1947 (age 79); Bentonia, Mississippi, United States
- Genres: Bentonia School, blues
- Occupations: Musician, songwriter, cafe proprietor
- Instruments: Vocals, guitar
- Years active: 1970s–present
- Labels: Broke and Hungry Records; Blue Front Records; Easy Eye Sound

Jimmy "Duck" Holmes (born July 28, 1947) is an American blues musician and proprietor of the Blue Front Cafe on the Mississippi Blues Trail, the oldest surviving juke joint in Mississippi. Holmes is known as the last of the Bentonia bluesmen, as he is the last blues musician to play the Bentonia School. Like Skip James and Jack Owens and other blues musicians from Bentonia, Mississippi, Holmes learned to play the blues from Henry Stuckey, the originator of the Bentonia blues. Holmes' music is based in the Bentonia tuning utilizing open E-minor, open D-minor and a down tuned variant, and is noted for its haunting, ethereal, rhythmic and hypnotic qualities. His eighth album, It Is What It Is, on Blue Front Records has been praised by fans and music critics who have called it: "addictive" and "obsession worthy", and "as gritty, stark and raw as one could imagine" and "absolutely hypnotic", and "an essential modern recording".

== Early life ==
Jimmy Charles Holmes was born in Yazoo County, Mississippi, United States, to Carey and Mary Holmes at their home in Bentonia, Mississippi. Holmes' parents were sharecroppers, who opened the Blue Front Cafe in 1948, the year after he was born. They had ten children, but also raised four grandchildren when one of their daughters died. Jimmy Holmes took over the Blue Front Cafe when his father died in 1970.

== Music and musical influences ==
Holmes' was first taught how to play the Bentonia School by Henry Stuckey, the man who created the unique style of blues after he returned to Bentonia, Mississippi after World War I. Stuckey moved next door to Holmes and the young Holmes would hear Stuckey playing on his front porch. Around 1957, Holmes picked up Stuckey's guitar and started to learn.

Carey Holmes bought Jimmy his first guitar, a yellow and black plastic toy guitar for Christmas. While Holmes would occasionally play with an uncle's electric guitar when he visited his uncle in New York City in the 1960s, it was not until the 1970s that Holmes bought his first guitar, a small acoustic guitar from Radio Shack. That original guitar is on permanent display at the Delta Blues Museum in Clarksdale, Mississippi. During the 1970s, Bentonia blues musicians, Jack Owens, Cornelius Bright, Tommy West, Adam Slater, Dodd Stuckey (Henry Stuckey's brother), and Jacob Stuckey, (Henry Stuckey's cousin), came to the Blue Front Cafe to play. Slater, Bright and West initially started to teach Holmes how to play, but it took the arrival of Jack Owens at the Blue Front Cafe on a regular basis in the 1980s, before Holmes fully grasped the style.

Owens came to the Blue Front several times a week and Holmes sat outside with him and learned how to play such songs as "Hard Times Killing Floor Blues", "Devil Got My Woman", "Cherry Ball", and "Catfish". At the same time, Tommy West, a Hill country blues musician was also teaching Holmes how to play in that idiom. Holmes eventually incorporated some of the techniques he learned from West into his own playing, including using the low E string for a droning bass line.

Holmes' music is based in the Bentonia tuning utilizing open E-minor, open D-minor and a down tuned variant, Acknowledging that he writes neither music nor lyrics and does not read music, Holmes says, ""I mean, I guess it's a divine thing. I don't know".

== Professional career ==
Holmes was initially recorded by several people in the late 1970s and early 1980s, including Alan Lomax and David Evans. The earliest known released recording of Holmes was "Devil's Blues" that he recorded with Cornelius Bright for Evans. It appeared in 1991 on a Wolf Records compilation album, Giants of the Country Blues Guitar - Vol. 2.

In the 1980s, Holmes began performing at the Bentonia Blues Festival that Holmes and his mother, Mary Holmes, started in 1972 as a community event that grew into one of the longest running blues festivals in the country. Holmes also started playing other blues festivals across Mississippi, the United States, Europe and South America including the Chicago Blues Festival, Waterfront Blues Festival, Mississippi Valley Blues Festival, Muddy Roots Music Festival, Briggs Farm Blues Festival, amongst others.

In 2003, Holmes recorded his first album over the course of three days at the Pluto Plantation for Shade Tree Records. It was a blues label started by Peter Lee, although the company folded before it ever released the recordings. Then in October 2005, Jeff Konkel visited the Blue Front Cafe and returned on November 17, 2005, to record Holmes. Those recordings were released in 2006 as Back to Bentonia on CD as Holmes's debut release and the first release by Broke and Hungry Records. The album featured some traditional Bentonia Blues songs as well as original compositions. Holmes was awarded two Living Blues Awards for Back to Bentonia, including Best Debut Blues Album and Best Acoustic Blues Album. Konkel was awarded Producer of the Year for 2006.

In 2007, Broke and Hungry Records released Holmes' second CD entitled, Done Got Tired of Tryin' . The CD received additional critical acclaim and was named one of the top 10 Blues Albums of 2007 by WXPN, World Cafe and was nominated for a Blues Music Award. In 2008, Fat Possum Records released Gonna Get Old Someday consisting of those original tracks Holmes recorded in 2003 for Shade Tree Records. In 2010, Broke and Hungry Records released Holmes' fourth album, Ain't It Lonesome.

== Reception ==
Since Holmes started his recording career, he has appeared in documentaries, television programs and radio programs. In 2008, Holmes and the Blue Front Cafe were featured in the documentary M for Mississippi produced by Konkel and Roger Stolle. On October 22, 2012, Holmes appeared with Terry "Harmonica" Bean at World Cafe Live on WXPN as part of the Mississippi Blues Project. He appeared in the 2015 documentary film I Am the Blues.

His 2019 recording, Cypress Grove, was chosen as a 'Favorite Blues Album' by AllMusic. On November 24, 2020, The Recording Academy nominated Cypress Grove for the Grammy Award for Best Traditional Blues Album at the 63rd Annual Grammy Awards presentation on March 14, 2021.

Holmes' music is noted for its haunting, ethereal, rhythmic and hypnotic qualities. His eighth album, It Is What It Is, on Blue Front Records has been praised by fans and music critics who have called it: "addictive" and "obsession worthy", "as gritty, stark and raw as one could imagine" and "absolutely hypnotic", and "an essential modern recording".

== Albums ==
- Back to Bentonia, 2006
- Done Got Tired of Tryin’, 2007
- Gonna Get Old Someday, 2008
- Ain't It Lonesome, 2009
- All Night Long, 2013
- Twice As Hard, 2014
- Live at Briggs Farm Blues Festival, 2015
- It Is What It Is, 2016
- Cypress Grove, 2019
