= Little Freddie King =

American Delta blues guitarist

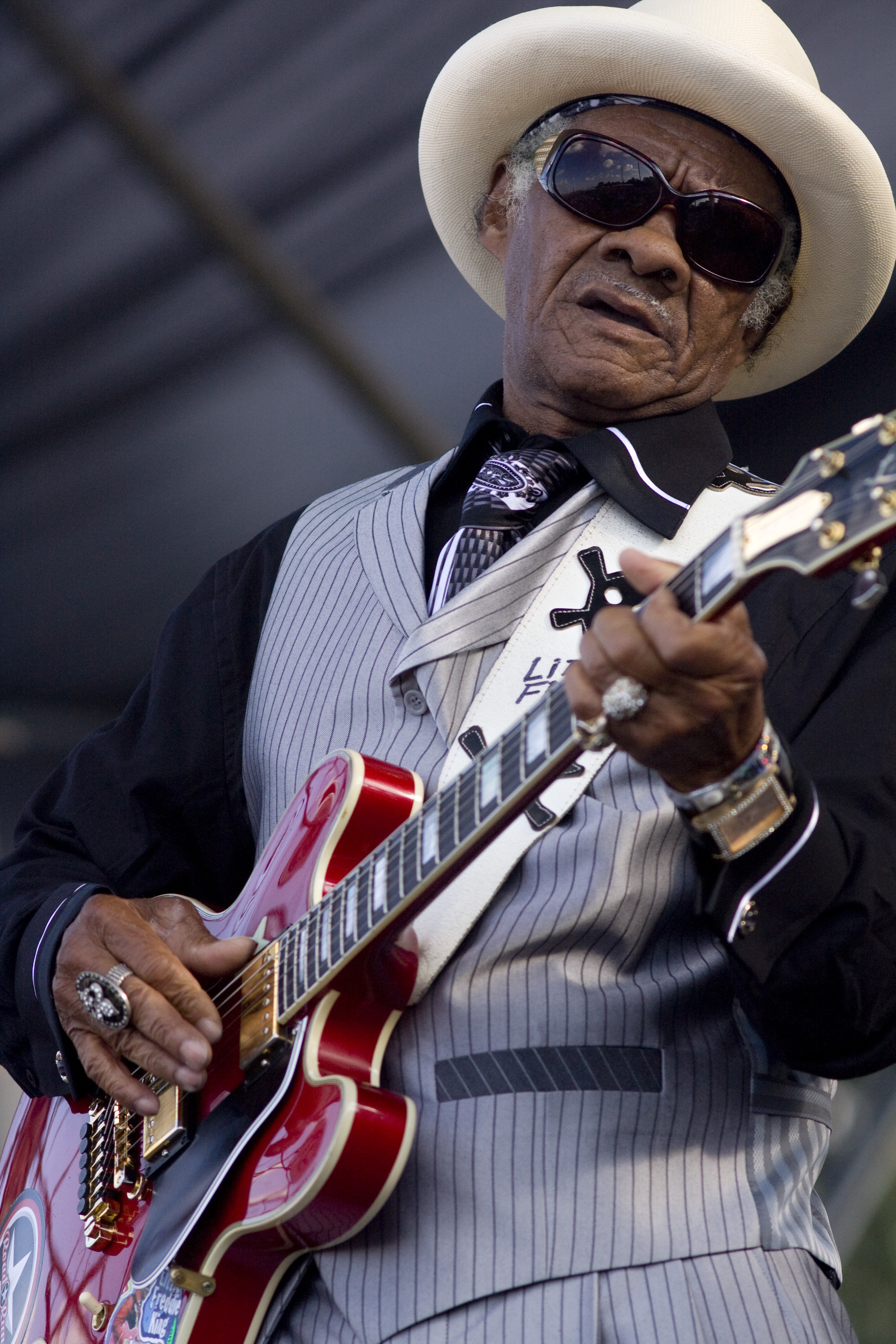
- King at the French Quarter Festival, 2012

Background information
- Born: Fread Eugene Martin; July 19, 1940 (age 85); McComb, Mississippi, United States
- Genres: Electric blues, Texas blues
- Occupations: Guitarist, vocalist
- Instruments: Guitar, vocals
- Years active: Mid 1950s–present
- Website: https://littlefreddieking.com/

Little Freddie King (born Fread Eugene Martin, July 19, 1940) is an American Delta blues guitarist. Despite the name, his style is not based on that of Freddie King, but is more influenced by John Lee Hooker and his approach to electric blues is original.

== Biography ==
King, a cousin of Lightnin' Hopkins, was born in McComb, Mississippi, and learned to play the guitar from his father. In 1954, at the age of 14, he moved to New Orleans. He performed in juke joints with his friends Babe Stovall, Slim Harpo, and Champion Jack Dupree, playing both acoustic and electric guitar.

He recorded the first electric blues album in New Orleans with Harmonica Williams in 1969. In 1976, King undertook a European tour with Bo Diddley and John Lee Hooker. His next recording opportunity came in 1996, 27 years after his first, with the release of Swamp Boogie. King's Sing Sang Sung (2000) was recorded live at the Dream Palace in Faubourg Marigny.

King is a charter member of the New Orleans Jazz & Heritage Festival and has played at the festival for 42 years. He is a member of the Louisiana Music Hall of Fame. He was selected three times as Blues Performer of the Year in New Orleans. He was honored with a Mississippi Blues Trail marker in McComb, Mississippi. In 2007, King co-contributed to the Alabama Slim album, The Mighty Flood.

His 2012 album, Chasing tha Blues, won Best Blues Album at the 12th Annual Independent Music Awards. He appeared in the 2015 documentary film I Am the Blues and the Midnight In The Crescent City documentary by Ben Chace.

King's album, Jaw Jackin' Blues, was released in 2020.

== Awards and honors ==
OffBeat recognized King with a Lifetime Achievement Award in 2021–22.

== Discography ==
- Harmonica Williams and Little Freddie King (1969), Ahura Mazda Records
- Swamp Boogie (1996), Orleans Records
- Sing Sang Sung (live album) (2000), Orleans Records
- FQF Live (2003), WWOZ (Library of Congress Recording)
- You Don't Know What I Know (2005), Fat Possum Records
- Messin' Around tha House (2008), Made Wright Records
- Gotta Walk with Da King (2010), Made Wright Records
- Jazzfest Live (2011), MunckMix, Inc.
- Back in Vinyl, LP (2011), APO Records
- Chasing tha Blues (2012), Made Wright Records
- Messin' Around tha Living Room (2015), Made Wright Records
- Fried Rice & Chicken (2018), Orleans Records
- Queen and Slim: The Soundtrack (2019), Motown Records
- Going Upstairs: (2022), Newvelle Records
- Jaw Jackin' Blues (2020), Made Wright Records
- Blues Medicine (2022), Made Wright Records
