= She Lyin' =

Studio album by Skip James
- Released: 1993
- Recorded: 1964
- Genre: Blues
- Length: 43:55
- Label: Genes
- Producers: John Fahey, Bill Barth, ED Denson, Gene Rosenthal

Skip James chronology
| Greatest of the Delta Blues Singers | She Lyin' | Today! |

She Lyin' is the second studio album by American blues singer Skip James, recorded in 1964 and released in 1993. It was originally recorded for Takoma Records and was James' first recording since his rediscovery in 1964.

== History ==
After an early career of performing and recording for the Paramount label in the 1930s, James recorded nothing and drifted in and out of music, virtually unknown. In 1964, blues enthusiasts John Fahey, Bill Barth and Henry Vestine found him in a hospital in Tunica, Mississippi. The "rediscovery" of both James and of Son House at virtually the same moment was the start of the "blues revival" in America.

Fahey and his partner in Takoma Records, ED Denson, signed James to a recording contract. Along with Barth, they arranged for sessions with sound engineer Gene Rosenthal in Rosethal's basement studio in Silver Spring, Maryland. Due to legal issues concerning the rights to the songs, the recording was not released by Takoma and in 1971 Fahey sold the record to Rosenthal.

The studio sessions are supplemented in this release with live performance recordings made by Rosenthal at the Ontario Place Coffee House in Washington, D.C. during the same period.

Although James was not initially covered as frequently as other rediscovered musicians, the British rock band, Cream's version of "I'm So Glad" provided him the only windfall of his career. Cream based their version on James's simplified 1960s recording, instead of the faster, more intricate 1931 original. Deep Purple covered "I'm So Glad" on their first album, Shades of Deep Purple.

== Reception ==
Professional ratings
Review scores
| Source | Rating |
|---|---|
| AllMusic | 4.5/5 stars |
| Robert Christgau | A− |
| The Penguin Guide to Blues Recordings | 3/4 stars |

In his review for AllMusic, Ron Wynn called the newly re-discovered James "still capable of playing entrancing, dynamic music, but was much less consistent and not as striking a vocalist" and the release in general "just as solid as the albums James recorded for Columbia during the same period."

== Track listing ==
All songs written by Skip James except as noted.

1. "All Night Long" – 1:20
2. "Broke and Hungry" – 1:46
3. "I'm So Glad" – 2:54
4. "Bad Whiskey" – 1:32
5. "Cypress Grove Blues" (James, Henry Thomas) – 4:02
6. "Catfish Blues" – 5:02
7. "Goin' Away to Stay" – 2:26
8. "Crow Jane" – 2:05
9. "Devil Got My Woman" – 3:09
10. "She Lyin'" – 1:12
11. "Hard Time Killin' Floor Blues" – 2:16
12. "Drunken Spree" – 3:32
13. "Black Gal" – 3:15
14. "Illinois Blues" – 3:00
15. "Worried Blues" – 3:27
16. "Look Down the Road" – 2:57

== Personnel ==
- Skip James – vocals, guitar, piano

Production notes:

- John Fahey – producer
- Bill Barth – producer
- ED Denson – producer
- Gene Rosenthal – producer, compilation producer, engineer, mixing, digital editing, photography
- George Mitchell – digital editing
- Dan Doyle – compilation producer
- Dick Bangham – art direction, design
- Linda Gibbon – artwork, graphic design
- Jim Marshall – photography
- Richard K. Spottswood – liner notes
- Larry Hoffman – liner notes
