= Ruby, Mississippi =

Ruby may refer to the following communities in Mississippi:

- Ruby, Copiah County, Mississippi
- Ruby, Leflore County, Mississippi
