= LeFlore County =

LeFlore County may refer to:

- Leflore County, Mississippi
- LeFlore County, Oklahoma
