= Skip James =

American Delta blues singer (1902–1969)

- Skip James at the Newport Folk Festival in 1964

Background information
- Born: Nehemiah Curtis James; June 9, 1902; Bentonia, Mississippi, U.S.
- Died: October 3, 1969 (aged 67) Philadelphia, Pennsylvania, U.S.
- Genres: Delta blues, country blues, gospel blues
- Occupations: Musician; songwriter; preacher
- Instruments: Vocals; guitar; piano
- Years active: 1931, 1964–1969
- Labels: Paramount; Storyville; Vanguard

Nehemiah Curtis "Skip" James (June 9, 1902 – October 3, 1969) was an American Delta blues singer, guitarist, pianist and songwriter. AllMusic stated: "Coupling an oddball guitar tuning set against eerie, falsetto vocals, James's early recordings could make the hair stand up on the back of your neck."

His guitar playing is noted for its dark, minor-key sound, played in an open D-minor tuning with an intricate fingerpicking technique. James first recorded for Paramount Records in 1931, but these recordings sold poorly, having been released during the Great Depression, and he drifted into obscurity.

After a long absence from the public eye, James was rediscovered in 1964 by blues enthusiasts including John Fahey, helping further the blues and folk music revival of the 1950s and early 1960s. During this period, James appeared at folk and blues festivals, gave concerts around the country, and recorded several albums for various record labels. His songs have influenced generations of musicians and have been adapted by numerous artists. He has been hailed as "one of the seminal figures of the blues".

== Biography ==
=== Early years ===
Nehemiah Curtis James was born on June 9, 1902, in a segregated hospital near Bentonia, Mississippi. His mother Phyllis worked as a cook and babysitter on the Woodbine Plantation, which was 15 miles south of Yazoo City. His father Eddie James, a bootlegger who was described as a "local lowlife" by Stephen Calt, left the family around 1907. He later reformed and became a preacher. As a youth, James heard local musicians, such as Henry Stuckey, from whom he learned to play the guitar, and the brothers Charlie and Jesse Sims. His mother bought him a $2.50 guitar, which was his first instrument. James later began playing the organ in his teens. He left Bentonia in 1919, and began working on road construction and levee-building crews in Mississippi in the early 1920s, and wrote what is perhaps his earliest song, "Illinois Blues", about his experiences as a laborer. He began playing the guitar in open D-minor tuning.

=== 1920s and 1930s ===
For most of the 1920s, James worked a series of illicit jobs, such as bootlegging, gambling, and procuring. His lifestyle was reportedly so "unbridled", that when he returned to Bentonia from Dallas, Texas, in 1929, he was met with local reports of his supposed "violent death". He was met with the same reports five years earlier when he returned from Arkansas. That same year, in 1929, he met a local musician Johnny Temple, who became his first protégé. The 23 year old Temple learned how to play in cross-note tuning, which was then unknown to musicians who were from the Jackson area, and also attempted to copy James's high falsetto voice, until he advised Temple to sing in his natural voice. James also operated a music school for would-be blues musicians in Jackson, giving lessons on guitar, piano, and even violin.

James continued working locally as a street singer. In early 1931, James auditioned for the record shop owner and talent scout H. C. Speir in Jackson, Mississippi. Speir placed blues performers with various record labels, including Paramount Records. On the strength of this audition, James traveled to Grafton, Wisconsin, to record for Paramount. His 1931 records are considered idiosyncratic among prewar blues recordings and formed the basis of his reputation as a musician.

As was typical of his era, James recorded various styles of music – blues, spirituals, cover versions, and original compositions – frequently blurring the lines between genres and sources. For example, "I'm So Glad" was derived from a 1927 song, "So Tired", by Art Sizemore and George A. Little, recorded in 1928 by Gene Austin and by Lonnie Johnson (Johnson's version was entitled "I'm So Tired of Livin' All Alone"). James's biographer Stephen Calt, echoing the opinion of several music critics, considered the finished product totally original, "one of the most extraordinary examples of fingerpicking found in guitar music". Several other recordings from the Grafton session, such as "Hard Time Killing Floor Blues", "Devil Got My Woman", "Jesus Is a Mighty Good Leader", and "22-20 Blues" (the basis of Robert Johnson's better-known "32-20 Blues"), have been similarly influential. Very few original copies of James's Paramount 78 rpm records have survived.

The Great Depression struck just as James's recordings were hitting the market. Sales were poor as a result, and he gave up performing the blues to become the choir director in his father's church. James was later an ordained minister in Baptist and Methodist churches, but the extent of his involvement in religious activities is unknown.

=== Rediscovery and legacy ===
For the next 33 years, James made no known recordings and performed sporadically. He was virtually unknown to the general public until about 1960. Blues singer and guitarist Big Joe Williams believed that James had already died, having been murdered in Mississippi. In 1964, blues enthusiasts John Fahey, Bill Barth, and Henry Vestine found him in a hospital in Tunica, Mississippi. According to Calt, the "rediscovery" of both James and Son House at virtually the same time was the start of the blues revival in the United States.

In July 1964, James and other rediscovered musicians appeared at the Newport Folk Festival. Several photographs by the blues promoter Dick Waterman captured this performance, James's first in over 30 years. James subsequently recorded for Takoma Records, Melodeon Records, and Vanguard Records and performed at various engagements until his death from cancer on October 3, 1969, in Philadelphia, Pennsylvania, at the age of 67.

More of James's recordings have been available since his death than were available during his lifetime. His 1931 recordings and several of his recordings and concerts from the 1960s have been reissued on numerous compact discs, in and out of print. His songs were not initially recorded as frequently as those of other rediscovered blues musicians. However, the British rock band Cream recorded "I'm So Glad", providing James with $10,000 in royalties, the only windfall of his career. Subsequently, Cream's adaptation was recorded by other groups. James's "22-20" inspired the name of the English group 22-20s. The British post-rock band Hope of the States released a song partially about the life of James, entitled "Nehemiah", which reached number 30 on the UK Singles Chart. Only 15 copies of James' original shellac 78 recordings are still in existence, and have become extremely sought after by collectors.

In 2004, Wim Wenders directed the film The Soul of a Man (the second part of The Blues, a series produced by Martin Scorsese), focusing on the music of Blind Willie Johnson, J.B. Lenoir and James. Because James had not been filmed before the 1960s, Keith B. Brown played the part of the young James in the documentary. James's song "Hard Time Killing Floor Blues" was featured in the 2000 film O Brother, Where Art Thou? and included on the soundtrack album.

James was the inspiration for Dion's 2007 blues album, Son of Skip James, which peaked at No. 4 in the Billboard 200 chart.

James was honored with a marker on the Mississippi Blues Trail in Bentonia, his hometown.

In 2020, James's song "Devil Got My Woman" was added to the Grammy Hall of Fame.

=== Personality ===
James was described as aloof and moody. The musicologist Dick Spottswood commented, "Skip James, you never knew. Skip could be sunshine, or thunder and lightning depending on his whim of the moment".

== Musical style ==
=== Equipment ===
The guitar that James played in his 1931 sessions is now generally accepted to have been a 12-string Stella guitar restrung as a six-string. When he was rediscovered in the 1960s, he typically played a Gibson J-185, Gibson J-45, Martin D-18, and a Martin D-28.

=== James as guitarist ===
James often played guitar with an open D-minor tuning (D–A–D–F–A–D), resulting in the "deep" sound of the 1931 recordings. He reportedly learned this tuning from his musical mentor, the unrecorded bluesman Henry Stuckey, who in turn was said to have acquired it from Bahamian soldiers during the First World War, despite the fact that his service card shows he did not serve overseas. Robert Johnson also recorded in this tuning, his "Hell Hound on My Trail" being based on James's "Devil Got My Woman." James's classically informed fingerpicking style was fast and clean, using the entire register of the guitar, with heavy, hypnotic bass lines. His style of playing had more in common with the Piedmont blues of the East Coast than with the Delta blues of his native Mississippi.

=== The "Bentonia School" ===
James is sometimes associated with the Bentonia School, which is either a subgenre of blues music or a style of playing it. In a 1994 biography of James, I'd Rather Be the Devil: Skip James and the Blues, Stephen Calt maintained that no style of blues originated in Bentonia and that the "Bentonia School" is simply a notion of later blues writers who overestimated the provinciality of Mississippi during the early 20th century, when railways linked small towns. Calt asserts these writers failed to see that in the case of Bentonia bluesman Jack Owens, "the 'tradition' he bore primarily consisted of musical scraps from James' table". Owens and other musicians who may have been contemporaries of James were not recorded until the revival of interest in blues music in the 1960s. Whether the work of these musicians constituted a "school", and whether James originated it or was a member of it himself, remain open questions. One of the last living links to the original Bentonia school is Jimmy "Duck" Holmes, the owner of the Blue Front Cafe in Bentonia, Mississippi. Holmes learned to play in this particular style directly from Henry Stuckey, who reportedly taught James and Owens himself. Accordingly, Duck is called the "last of the Bentonia Bluesmen".

== Discography ==
=== Paramount 78 RPM records, 1931 ===
A-side	B-side
"Cherry Ball Blues"	"Hard Time Killing Floor Blues"
"22-20 Blues"	"If You Haven't Any Hay Get on Down the Road"
"Illinois Blues"	"Yola My Blues Away"
"How Long 'Buck'"	"Little Cow and Calf Is Gonna Die Blues"
"Devil Got My Woman"	"Cypress Grove Blues"
"I'm So Glad"	"Special Rider Blues"
"Four O'Clock Blues"	"Hard Luck Child"
"Jesus Is a Mighty Good Leader"	"Be Ready When He Comes"
"Drunken Spree"	"What Am I to Do"

Much like his later recordings, these initial records have been repeatedly reissued and are scattered among many compilations released by small labels. Consequently, many of these releases are of varying quality. There are at least two releases that have been digitally remastered, listed below.

- Complete 1931 Recordings In Chronological Order (Document DOCD-5005, 1990) remastered by Hans Klement
- The Complete Early Recordings of Skip James – 1930 (Yazoo 2009, 1994) remastered by Rich Nevins, Joe Tarantino, and Scott Levitin

=== Later recordings, 1964–1969 ===
Despite poor health, James recorded several LPs from 1964 to 1969, mostly revisiting his 1931 sides, traditional music, and spirituals, but also including a handful of newly written blues meditating on his illness and convalescence. These five prolific years have not been thoroughly documented: recordings, outtakes, and interviews not released on James's LPs (which have been repeatedly cannibalized and reissued) are scattered among many compilations released by small labels. Original recordings and reissues are listed below.

- Greatest of the Delta Blues Singers (Melodeon, Biograph, 1964)
- She Lyin' (Adelphi, 1964; first released by Genes, 1996)
- Today! (Vanguard, 1966)
- Devil Got My Woman (Vanguard, 1968)
- I'm So Glad (Vanguard, 1978)
- Live: Boston, 1964 & Philadelphia, 1966 (Document, 1994)
- Skip's Piano Blues, 1964 (Genes, 1998)
- Blues from the Delta, with two previously unreleased recordings (Vanguard, 1998)
- The Complete Bloomington, Indiana Concert, March 30, 1968 (Document, 1999)
- Skip's Guitar Blues, 1964(?), (Genes, 1999)
- Studio Sessions: Rare and Unreleased, 1967 (Vanguard, 2003)
- Hard Time Killing Floor Blues (Biograph, 2003†)
- Heroes of the Blues: The Very Best of Skip James (Shout!, 2003)
- Hard Time (Universe, 2003†)
- Cypress Grove Blues (2004)
- Hard Time Killin' Floor (Yazoo 2075, 2005)
