= Today! (Skip James album) =

Studio album by Skip James
- Released: 1966
- Recorded: January 9–10, 1966
- Genre: Blues
- Label: Vanguard

Skip James chronology
She Lyin' (1965)	Today! (1966)	Devil Got My Woman (1968)

Today! is the third studio album by Delta blues musician Skip James, released in 1966 by Vanguard Records.

== Reception ==
Professional ratings
Review scores
Source	Rating
AllMusic	5/5 stars
The Penguin Guide to Blues Recordings	2.5/4 stars
The Rolling Stone Album Guide	5/5 stars

AllMusic critic Ron Wynn wrote that "wonderful vocals, superb guitar and a couple of tunes with tasty piano make this essential."

== Track listing ==
All tracks are written by Skip James except as noted.

Side One
No.	Title	Length
1.	"Hard Time Killing Floor Blues"	3:24
2.	"Crow Jane"	3:00
3.	"Washington D.C. Hospital Center Blues"	4:12
4.	"Special Rider Blues"	5:11
5.	"Drunken Spree"	2:49
6.	"Cherryball"	4:28

Side Two
No.	Title	Writer(s)	Length
7.	"How Long"	Leroy Carr	2:58
8.	"All Night Long"		5:03
9.	"Cypress Grove"		4:20
10.	"Look Down the Road"		3:16
11.	"My Gal"		6:06
12.	"I'm So Glad"		1:54

== Personnel ==
- Skip James – vocals, guitar, piano
- Russ Savakus – bass (on "How Long")
