= Bentonian =

Bentonian may refer to:

- Hard money (policy) regarding the use of Bentonian currency, named after US Senator Thomas Hart Benton
- The Bentonia School, a style of guitar playing
