= Baptist Town, Mississippi =

- Neighborhood
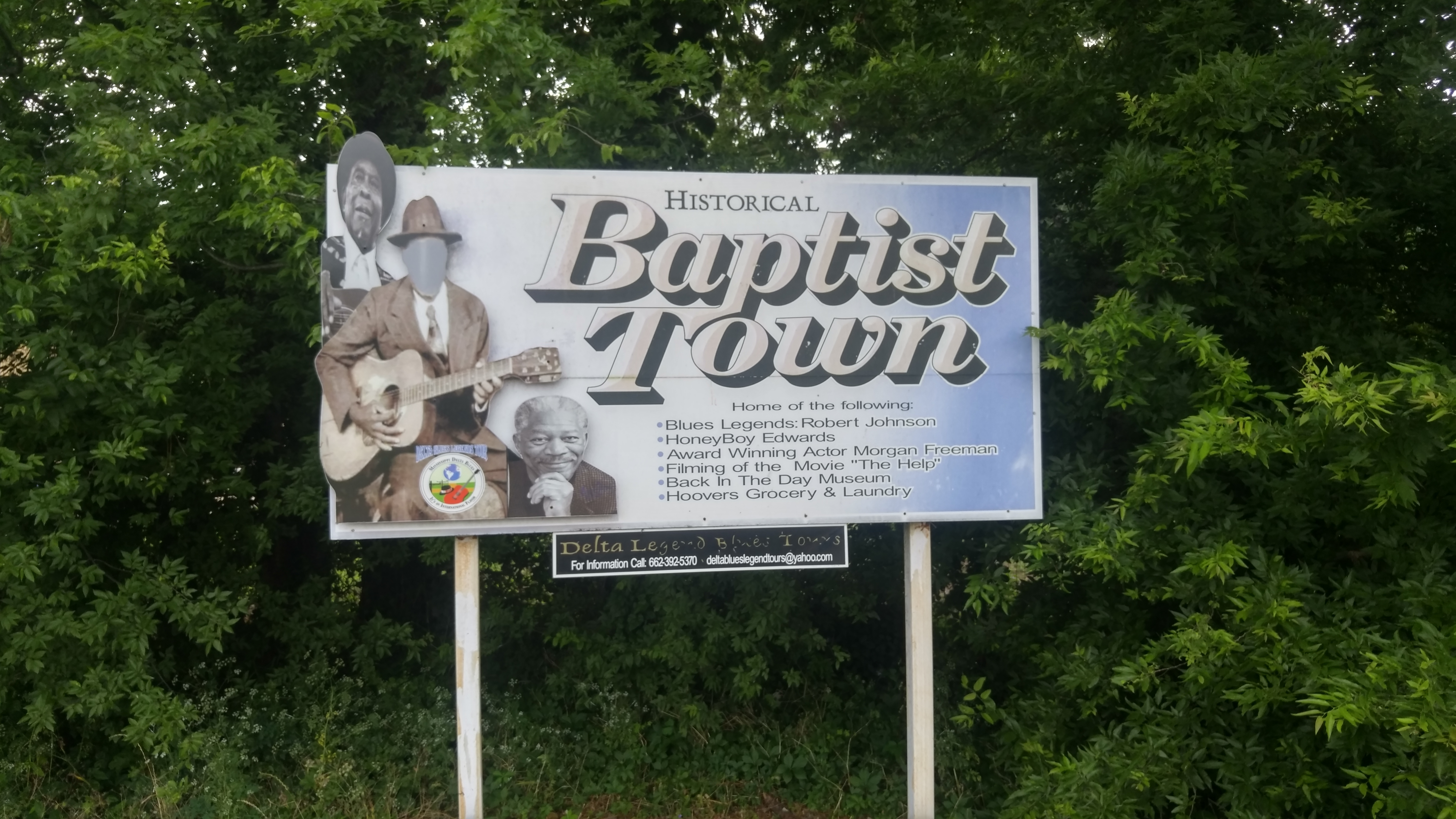

- Location within Mississippi Location within the United States
- Coordinates: 33°31′7″N 90°11′2″W
- Country: United States
- State: Mississippi
- County: Leflore
- Elevation: 200 ft (61 m)
- Time zone: UTC-6 (Central (CST))
  - Summer (DST): UTC-5 (CDT)
- ZIP code: 38930, 38935
- Area code: 662

Baptist Town is a historical African-American neighborhood located in Greenwood, Mississippi located east of the downtown area.

A Mississippi Blues Trail marker was erected in the neighborhood in 2009 noting its contribution to the blues.

Scenes from The Help (2011) were filmed in Baptist Town.

== Notable residents ==
- Morgan Freeman, Academy Award winning actor was raised in Baptist Town.
- Robert Johnson, blues singer, songwriter and musician. Lived and performed in Baptist Town.
- David "Honeyboy" Edwards, blues guitarist and singer. Lived and performed in Baptist Town and was a close friend of Robert Johnson.
