= I Am the Blues (film) =

- Film poster
- Directed by: Daniel Cross
- Written by: Daniel Cross
- Produced by: Daniel Cross; Bob Moore; Mila Aung-Thwin; Bruce Cowley
- Cinematography: John Price
- Edited by: Ryan Mullins
- Music by: Kim Ho
- Production company: EyeSteelFilm
- Release date: October 2015 (IDFA)
- Running time: 106 minutes
- Country: Canada
- Language: English

I Am the Blues is a 2015 Canadian documentary film directed by Daniel Cross. The film explores the culture of blues music, beginning at the Blue Front Cafe in Bentonia, Mississippi and expanding outward to profile many of the oldest blues musicians who are still performing on the traditional African American Chitlin' Circuit.

Musicians appearing in the film include Bobby Rush, Barbara Lynn, Henry Gray, Carol Fran, Little Freddie King, Lazy Lester, Robert "Bilbo" Walker, Jimmy "Duck" Holmes, R.L. Boyce, L. C. Ulmer and Paul "Lil' Buck" Sinegal.

The film premiered at the International Documentary Film Festival Amsterdam in October 2015, and had its Canadian premiere at the Hot Docs Canadian International Documentary Festival in May 2016.

The film won two Canadian Screen Awards at the 5th Canadian Screen Awards in 2017, for Best Feature Length Documentary and Best Cinematography in a Documentary.
