= Greatest of the Delta Blues Singers =

Studio album by Skip James
- Released: November 1965
- Recorded: December 16, 1964, Falls Church, Virginia
- Genre: Blues
- Label: Melodeon
- Producer: Richard Spottswood, Louisa Spottswood

Skip James chronology
Greatest of the Delta Blues Singers (1965)	She Lyin' (1966)

Alternative Cover
- Cover of the 2003 reissue of Greatest of the Delta Blues Singers

Greatest of the Delta Blues Singers is the debut album by the American blues singer Skip James, released in 1965. It was his first album released after his rediscovery in 1964.

== Background ==
James had recorded for the Paramount label in the 1930s without success. He was "rediscovered" in 1964 by the blues enthusiasts John Fahey, Bill Barth and Henry Vestine who found him in a hospital in Tunica, Mississippi.

Fahey and his partner in Takoma Records, ED Denson, signed James to a recording contract and he recorded at Gene Rosethal's basement studio in Silver Spring, Maryland. Because of legal issues concerning the rights to the songs, the recording was not released by Takoma. It was eventually released as She Lyin'.

The material for Greatest of the Delta Blues Singers was recorded in the home of the musicologist and author Richard K. Spottswood in December 1964 and completed in July 1965. It was released on Spottswood's Melodeon Records which was later sold to Biograph Records. Biograph reissued the material under the same title adding "Motherless & Fatherless", "Skip's Worried Blues", "Catfish Blues" and "Cypress Grove Blues". They also reissued the recordings with a different track order as A Tribute to Skip James and two other tracks from the 1964 sessions were included on King of the Delta Blues Singers. Biograph also released the material on CD as Hard Time Killing Floor Blues in 2003.

== Reception ==
Professional ratings
Review scores
Source	Rating
AllMusic	4.5/5 stars

In his review for AllMusic, Jason Ankeny wrote: "Although his guitar skills have lost a step in the intervening years, the passage of time has only made James' vocals that much more expressive; his new material is especially devastating, in particular 'Sick Bed Blues' and 'Washington D.C. Hospital Center Blues', both detailing the fight with cancer that eventually led to his death."

== Track listing ==
All tracks are written by Skip James.

No.	Title	Length
1.	"Hard Time Killin' Floor Blues"	3:25
2.	"Sick Bed Blues"	3:22
3.	"Washington D.C. Hospital Center Blues"	4:13
4.	"Devil Got My Woman"	6:17
5.	"Illinois Blues"	4:38
6.	"I Don't Want a Woman to Stay Out All Night Long"	4:32
7.	"Cherry Ball Blues"	3:51
8.	"All Night Long"	4:36

== Personnel ==
- Skip James – vocals, guitar, piano

Production notes:

- Richard K. Spottswood – producer
- Louisa Spottswood – producer
- Pete Kuykendall – engineer
- Bob O'Connell – cover drawing
- Bob Turner – cover design
- Ed Morris – liner notes
