= Browning, Mississippi =

- Unincorporated community
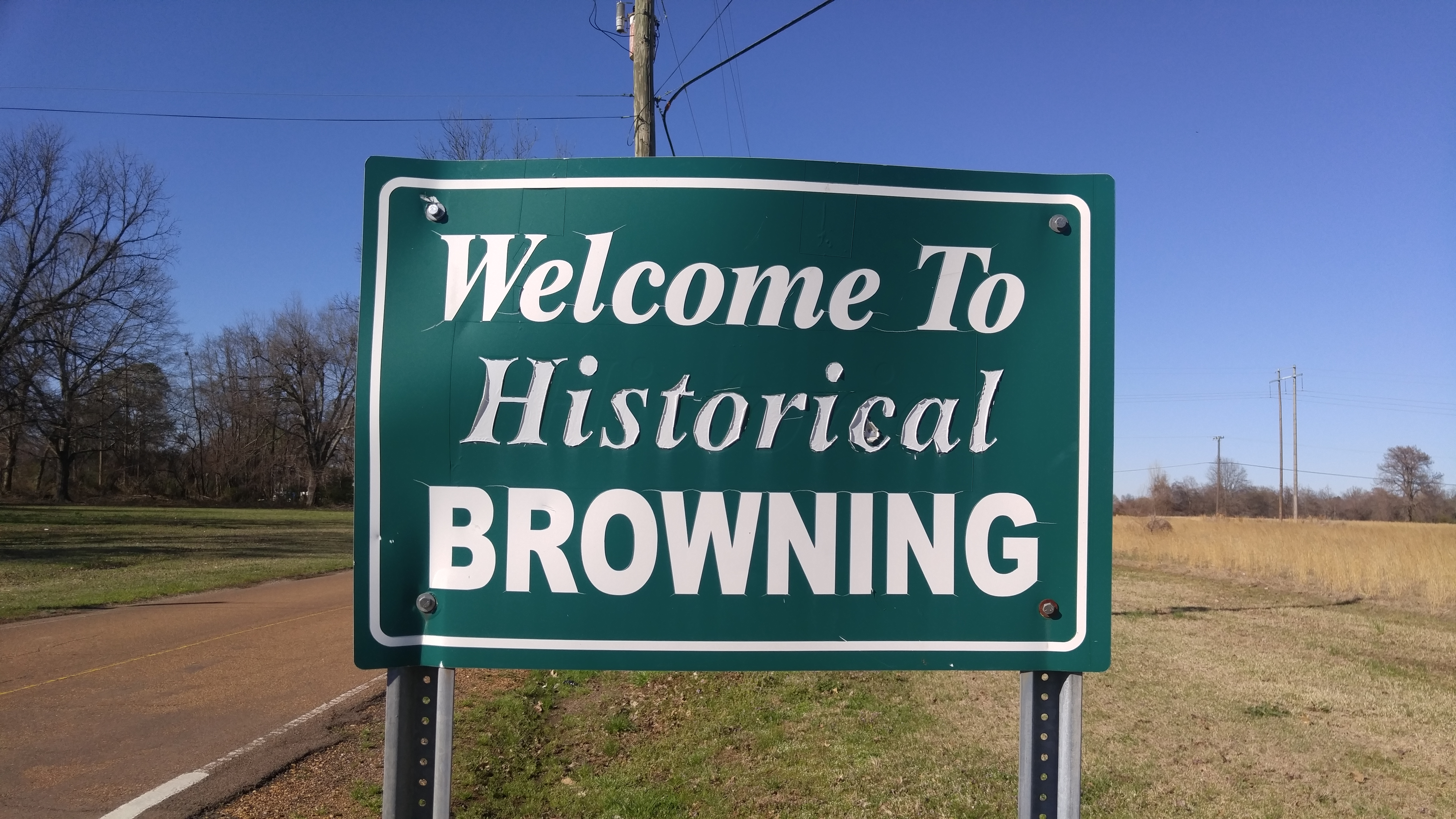

- Location within Mississippi Location within the United States
- Coordinates: 33°31′05″N 90°07′11″W
- Country: United States
- State: Mississippi
- County: Leflore
- Elevation: 131 ft (40 m)
- Time zone: UTC-6 (Central (CST))
  - Summer (DST): UTC-5 (CDT)
- ZIP code: 38930
- Area code: 662
- GNIS feature ID: 667634

Browning is an unincorporated community located in Leflore County, Mississippi. Browning is approximately 2 miles (3.2 km) east of Greenwood and 5 miles (8.0 km) west of Valley Hill on Browning Road near U.S. Route 82.

It is part of the Greenwood, Mississippi micropolitan area.

== History ==
Browning is located on the Columbus and Greenville Railway and was once known as Adlena. A post office operated under the name Adlena from 1898 to 1903 and under the name Browning from 1903 to 1912.

Browning was once home to a vocational school.

== Gallery ==
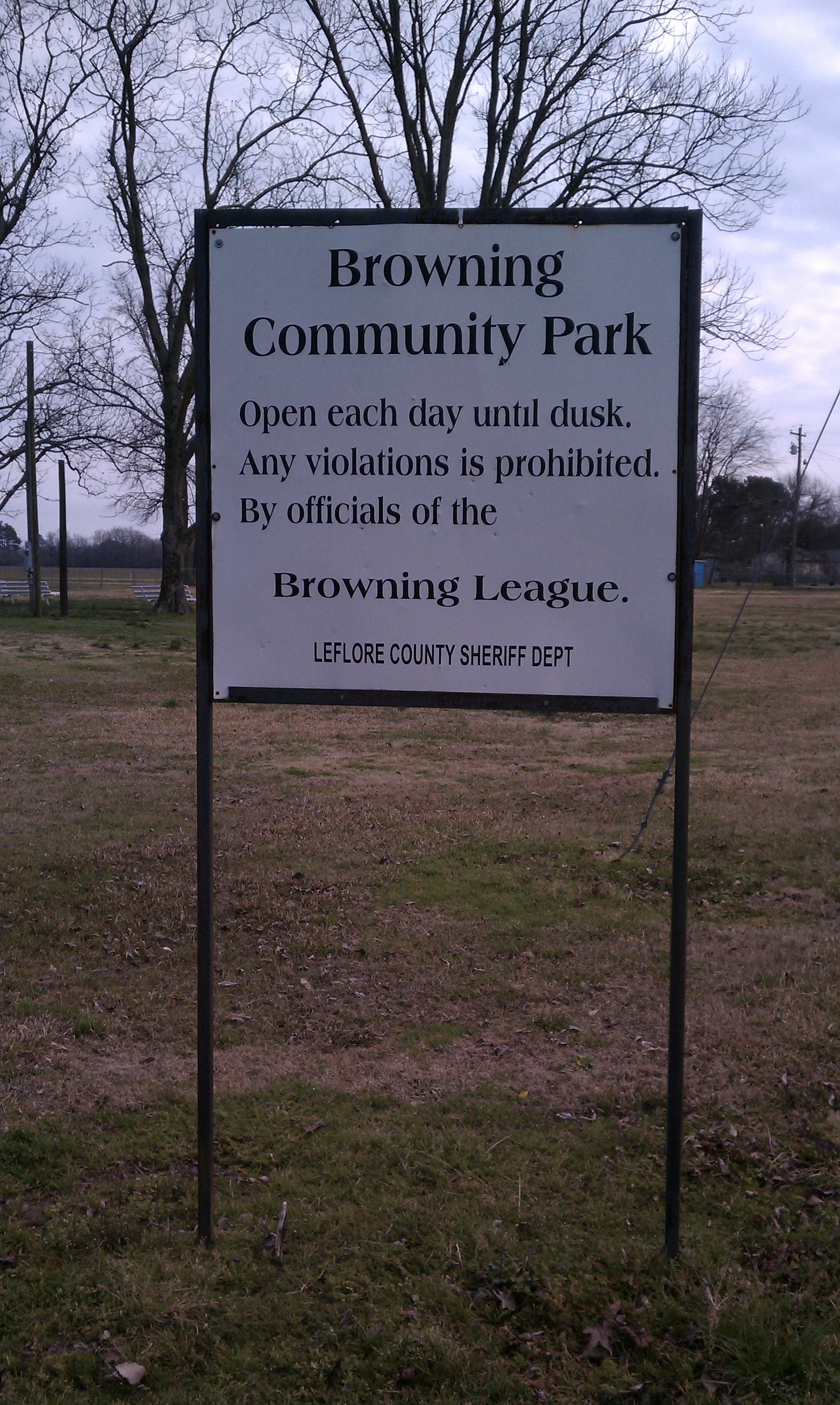
Browning Community Park sign located in the community

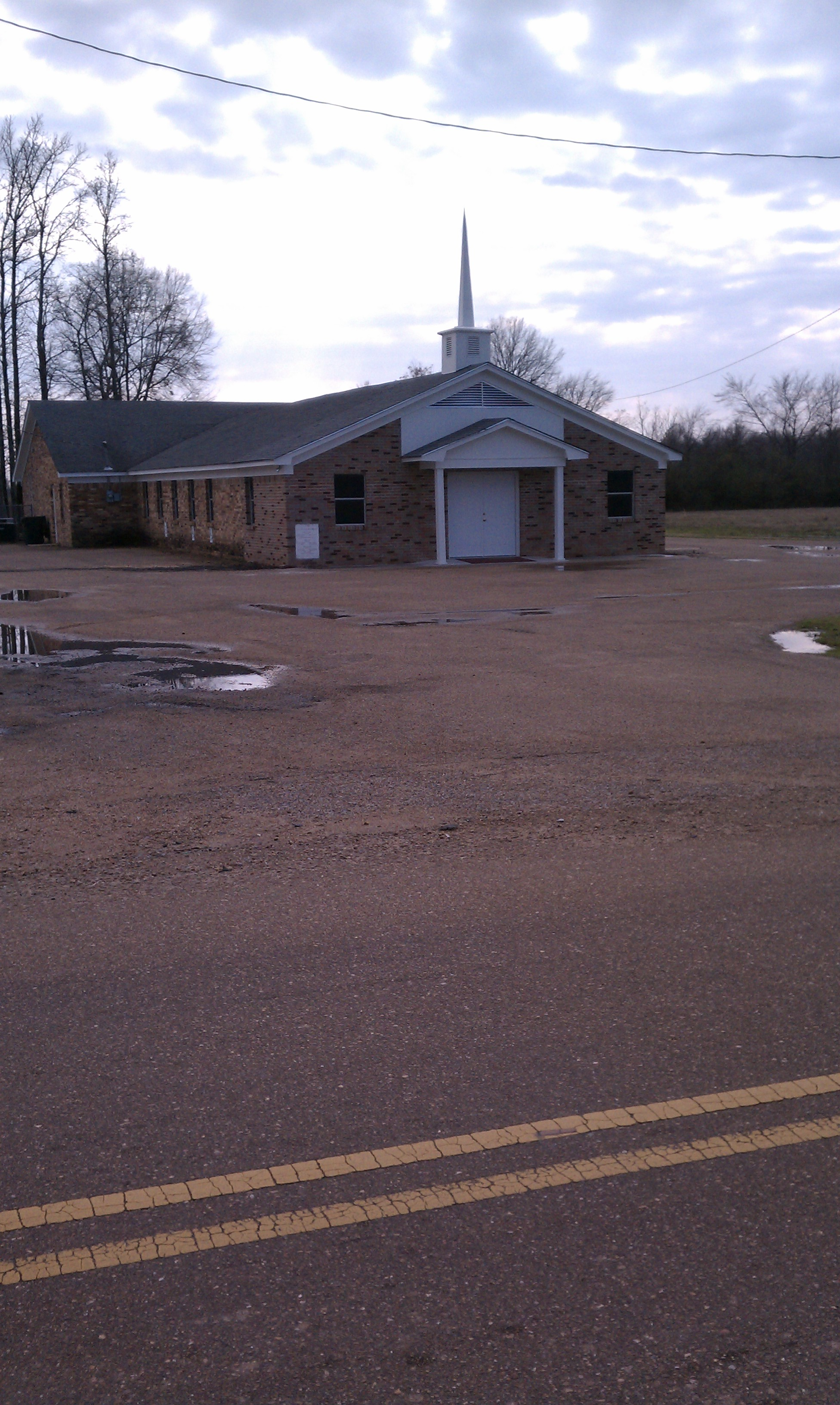
Morning Star M.B. Church located in Browning

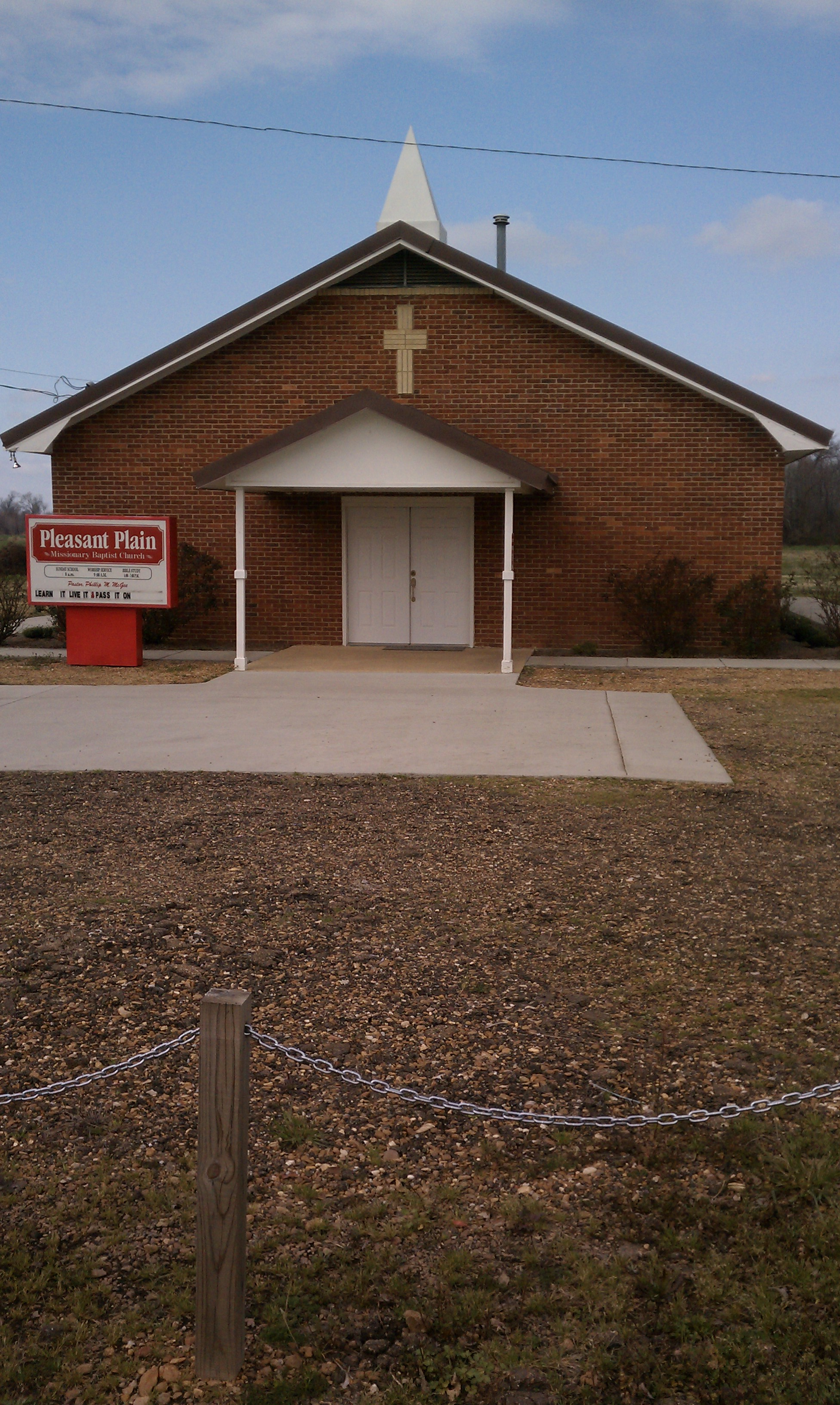
Pleasant Plain M.B. Church located on Browning Road in Browning

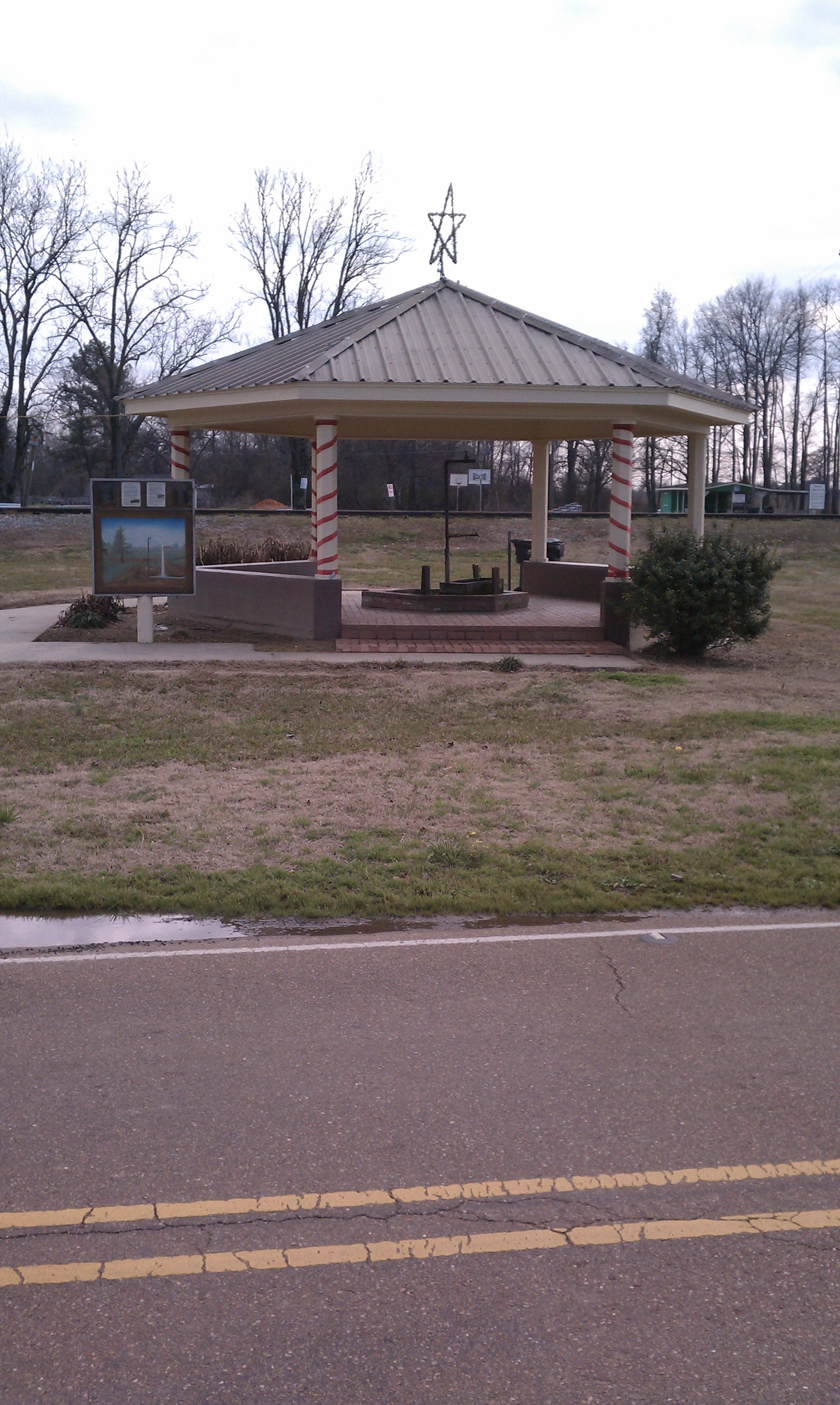
Browning Well, located on Browning Road in the community
