= Blue Front Cafe =

Historic old juke joint in Bentonia, Mississippi

Coordinates: 32.640732°N 90.364758°W

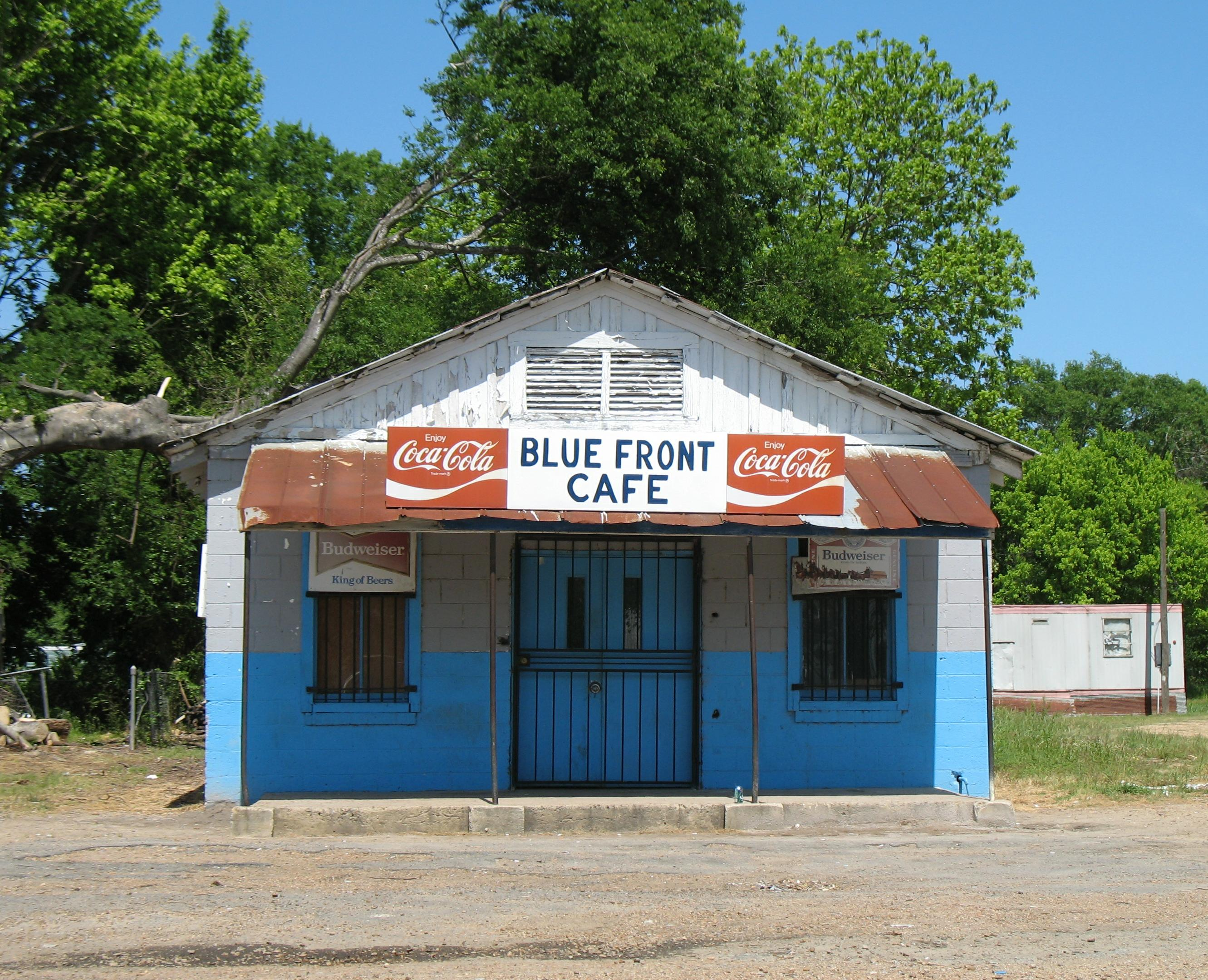
Blue Front Café, 2006

The Blue Front Café is a historic old juke joint made of cinder block in Bentonia, Mississippi on Highway 49, approximately 30 miles northwest of Jackson, which played an important role in the development of the blues in Mississippi. The café has been given a marker and officially placed on the Mississippi Blues Trail. It is owned by blues musician Jimmy "Duck" Holmes.

Located in the southern portion of the Mississippi Delta in Yazoo County on Highway 49, the field hands from the surrounding cotton plantations gathered at the Blue Front Café for relaxation and entertainment. This is the birthplace of a blues style known as Bentonia School.

The venue is profiled in the 2015 documentary film I Am the Blues.

The venue is featured prominently in The Black Keys music video for their cover of "Crawling King Snake".
