= Shellmound, Mississippi =

- Unincorporated community
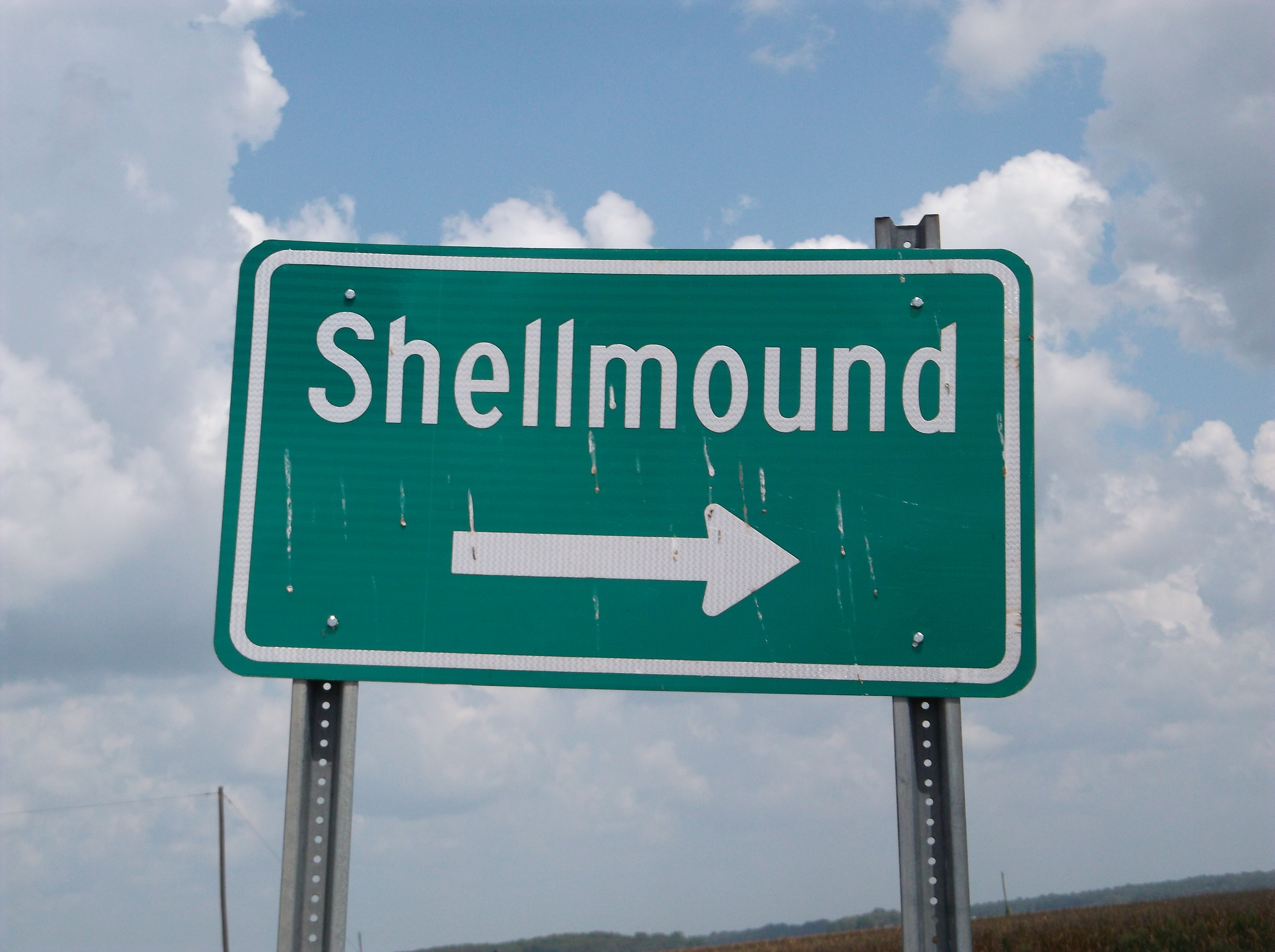

- Location within Mississippi Location within the United States
- Coordinates: 33°36′23″N 90°16′47″W
- Country: United States
- State: Mississippi
- County: Leflore
- Elevation: 131 ft (40 m)
- Time zone: UTC-6 (Central (CST))
  - Summer (DST): UTC-5 (CDT)
- ZIP code: 38930
- Area code: 662
- GNIS feature ID: 692223

Shellmound is an unincorporated community located in Leflore County, Mississippi, United States, located approximately 6 miles (9.7 km) north of Greenwood and approximately 6 miles (9.7 km) southeast of Schlater near U.S. Highway 49E.

It is part of the Greenwood, Mississippi micropolitan area.

== History ==
Shellmound is named for a nearby mound that had a large amount of shells on the surface. The area was possibly the site of a battle between the Chakchiuma and allied Choctaw and Chickasaw. Shellmound was founded as a landing on the Tallahatchie River and was one of the earliest settlements on the Tallahatchie. The community served as a distribution point for the area between the river and McNutt. In the late 1800s, Shellmound had four general stores, a doctor, and a population of 150.

A post office operated under the name Shellmound from 1854 to 1921.

== Music ==
Shellmound is home to one of Leflore County's seven Mississippi Blues Trail markers (at Racetrack Plantation).

== Gallery ==
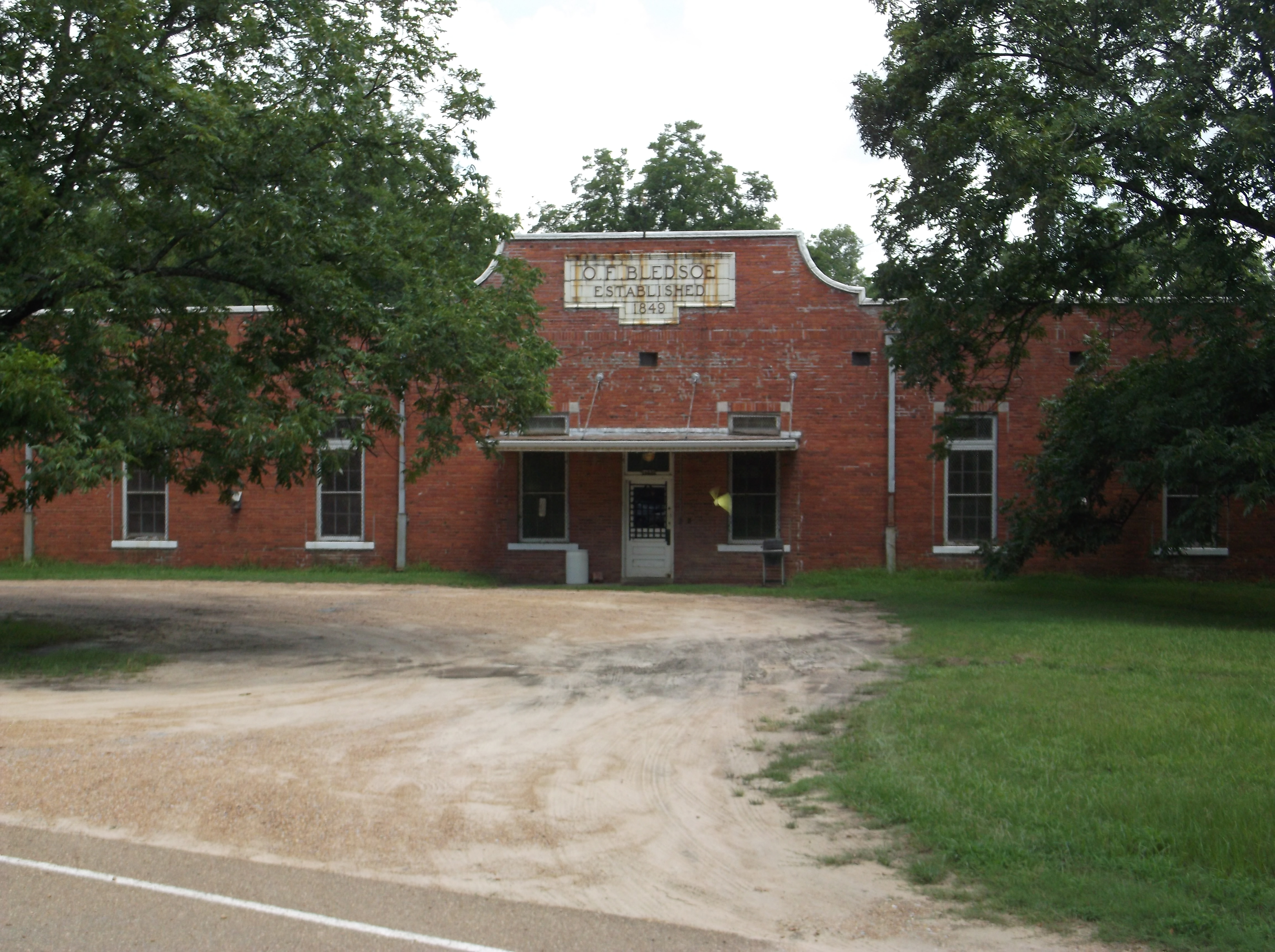
O.F. Bledsoe Building located in the community

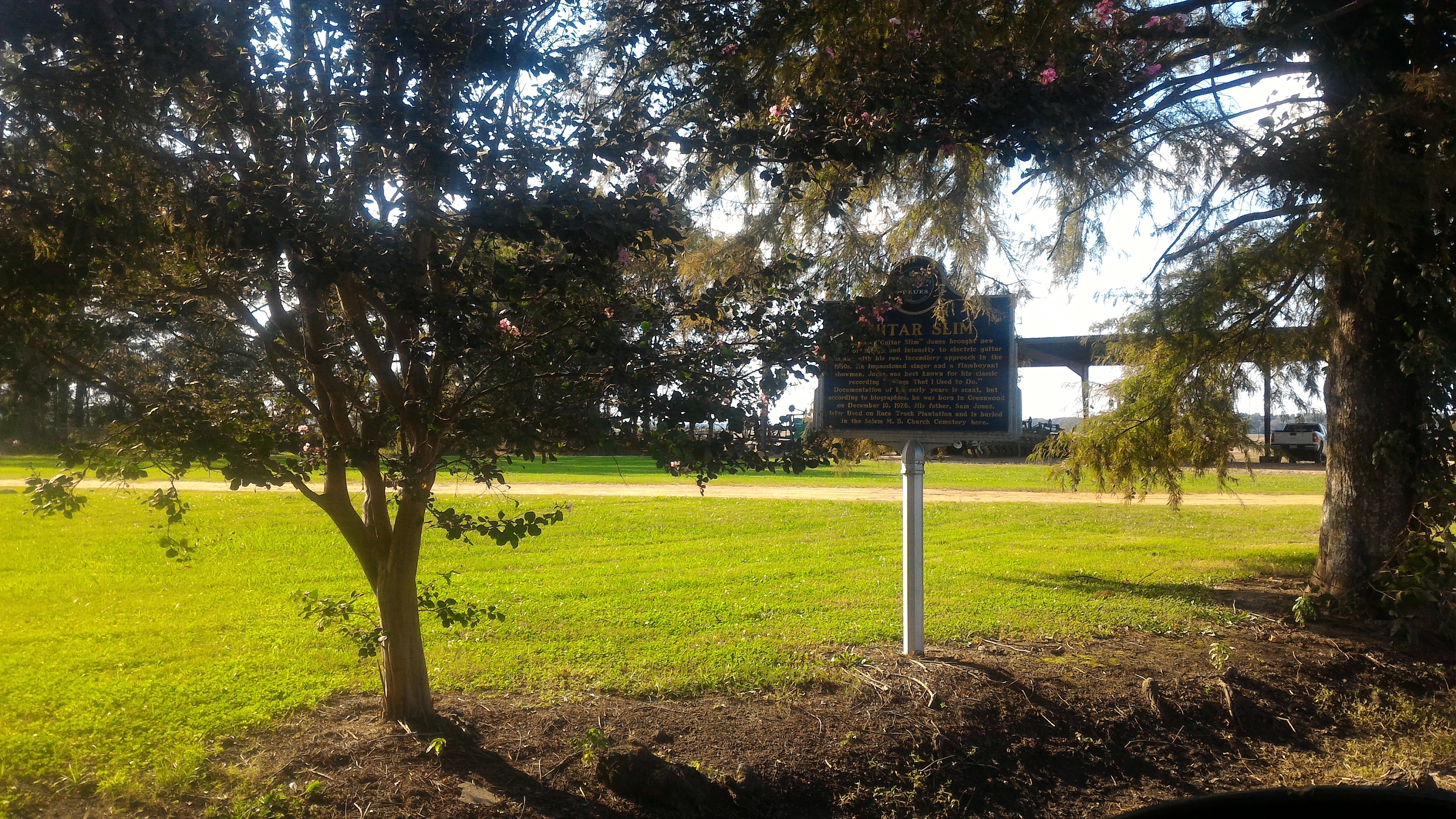
Guitar Slim Mississippi Blues Trail marker
