= Wildwood, Mississippi =

- Unincorporated community
- Location within Mississippi Location within the United States
- Coordinates: 33°37′09″N 90°14′28″W
- Country: United States
- State: Mississippi
- County: Leflore
- Elevation: 135 ft (41 m)
- Time zone: UTC-6 (Central (CST))
  - Summer (DST): UTC-5 (CDT)
- ZIP code: 38954
- Area code: 662
- GNIS feature ID: 679679

Wildwood is an unincorporated community located in Leflore County, Mississippi. Wildwood is approximately 4 miles (6.4 km) south of Money on County Road 626 (Wildwood Road).

It is part of the Greenwood, Mississippi micropolitan area.

== History ==
The community is named for the Wildwood Plantation, which was founded in 1852. The Wildwood Plantation Commissary and Shop are listed on the National Register of Historic Places.

== Notable people ==
- David "Honeyboy" Edwards, delta blues musician, lived at Wildwood as a child
- Charles E. Merrill, co-founder of Merrill Lynch, spent time in Wildwood as a youth and owned Wildwood Plantation until 1938.
