= Devil Got My Woman =

Studio album by Skip James
- Released: 1968
- Recorded: March 22–24, 1967
- Genre: Blues
- Length: 49:05
- Label: Vanguard

Skip James chronology
| Today! (1966) | Devil Got My Woman (1968) | I'm So Glad (1978) |

Devil Got My Woman is the fourth studio album by American blues singer Skip James, released in 1968. It was his last record before his death in 1969. The title track is featured in the 2001 film Ghost World. The original 78 RPM record from 1931 with the original version of the song on is a very desirable record among collectors, with only three known copies to exist, and only one out of the three in playable condition.

== Reception ==
Professional ratings
Review scores
| Source | Rating |
|---|---|
| AllMusic | 3/5 stars |
| The Penguin Guide to Blues Recordings | 2/4 stars |
| The Rolling Stone Album Guide | 5/5 stars |

AllMusic critic Scott Yanow wrote: "One can easily hear the influence that Skip James' music had on the then flourishing folk music movement, and he still sang his country blues with great intensity."

== Track listing ==
All tracks are written by Skip James except as noted.

| No. | Title | Writer(s) | Length |
|---|---|---|---|
| 1. | "Good Road Camp Blues" | | 3:47 |
| 2. | "Little Cow and Calf Is Gonna Die Blues" | | 3:20 |
| 3. | "Devil Got My Woman" | | 5:10 |
| 4. | "Look at the People Standing at the Judgment" | | 2:58 |
| 5. | "Worried Blues" | | 5:55 |
| 6. | "22-20 Blues" | James, Robert Johnson | 3:50 |
| 7. | "Mistreating Child Blues" | | 3:54 |
| 8. | "Sickbed Blues" | | 4:05 |
| 9. | "Catfish Blues" | | 4:35 |
| 10. | "Lorenzo Blues" | | 4:17 |
| 11. | "Careless Love" | W. C. Handy, Martha E. Koenig, Spencer Williams | 3:59 |
| 12. | "Illinois Blues" | | 3:15 |

== Personnel ==
- Skip James – vocals, guitar, piano
