= Stephen Calt =

Stephen George Calt (March 14, 1946 – October 17, 2010) was an American blues researcher, musician, lyricist and writer, who wrote biographies of Skip James and Charley Patton.

A teenage blues fan, Calt met Skip James at the 1964 Newport Folk Festival. James allowed Calt to interview him numerous times over subsequent years, and the resultant tapes formed the basis of Calt's biography, I'd Rather Be the Devil: Skip James and the Blues, published in 1994, many years after James' death. In it, Calt says of their first meeting: "Had I known how our lives would intersect over the next four years, I would not have initiated that first conversation."

In 1988, Calt's book, King of the Delta Blues: The Life and Music of Charlie Patton, was published. He also wrote Barrelhouse Words: A Blues Dialect Dictionary (2009), co-wrote R. Crumb's Heroes of Blues, Jazz and Country (2006), and wrote many articles and liner notes on pre-war blues music.

Calt died of emphysema in Queens, New York, in 2010, aged 64.
