= I'm So Glad =

Blues song first recorded by Skip James in 1931

Single by Skip James
- B-side: "Special Rider Blues"
- Released: February 1931
- Recorded: 1931
- Genre: Blues
- Length: 2:47
- Label: Paramount
- Songwriter(s): Skip James

"I'm So Glad" is a Delta blues-style song originally recorded by American musician Skip James in 1931. Blues historian Gerard Herzhaft notes "This spiritual probably dates back to the beginning of the blues". Blues writer Stephen Calt describes it as "a Two-Step piece marked by fiendishly fast playing [in] an eight bar arrangement comprised of single measures." Calt also adds the song is not related to an earlier Lonnie Johnson tune with a similar title.

Paramount Records released James' "I'm So Glad" on the then-standard 10-inch 78 rpm shellac phonograph record in 1931. It is included on various compilations as well as Hard Time Killing' Floor (2005), a CD collecting all of James's known recordings, issued by Yazoo Records.

James's version is noted for its irony, as the upbeat melody and repeated refrain of "I'm so glad" are set against lyrics that describe restlessness and romantic anguish.

James' song has been recorded by early blues artists, including Fred McDowell.

== Cream adaptation ==
"I'm So Glad"
Cream's studio version from the album Fresh Cream

British rock group Cream reworked "I'm So Glad" using an electric blues rock arrangement. In September 1966, they recorded it for their debut album, Fresh Cream. The song was a feature of their live performances and a recording from October 1968 is included on the album Goodbye (1969). An album review included: "it's the rampaging 'I'm So Glad' that illustrates how far they've come; compare it to the original studio version on Fresh Cream and it's easy to see just how much further they're stretching their improvisation."

As a result of Cream's albums and performances, "I'm So Glad" gained a much wider audience and other artists often based their versions on Cream's. Skip James was pleased with the new interpretation of his song and remarked: "That piece is absolutely gonna stand." Deep Purple added an intro and titled the song "Prelude: Happiness/I'm So Glad" for their first album Shades of Deep Purple (1968); "Jon Lord's organ flourishes, weaving classical riffs, and unexpected arabesques into "I'm So Glad," which sounds rather majestic here", according to AllMusic's Bruce Eder.

=== See also ===
- Christian child's prayer § Spirituals
