= Mississippi Blues Trail =

Historic trail in Mississippi

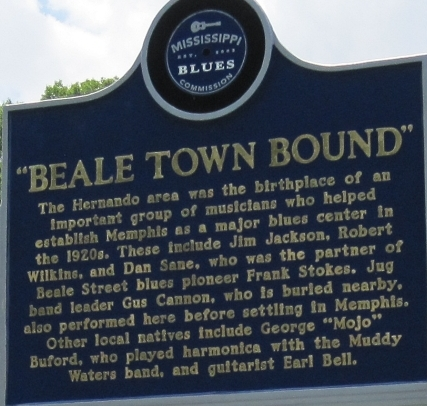
Blues Trail marker in Hernando, Mississippi

The Mississippi Blues Trail was created by the Mississippi Blues Commission in 2006 to place interpretive markers at the most notable historical sites related to the birth, growth, and influence of the blues throughout (and in some cases beyond) the state of Mississippi. Within the state the trail extends from the Gulf Coast north along several highways to (among other points) Natchez, Vicksburg, Jackson, Leland, Greenwood, Clarksdale, Tunica, Grenada, Oxford, Columbus, and Meridian. The largest concentration of markers is in the Mississippi Delta, but other regions of the state are also commemorated. Several out-of-state markers have also been erected where blues with Mississippi roots has had significance, including Waterloo, Ontario, Memphis, Tennessee, and Chicago, Illinois.

== Implementation ==
The list of markers and locations was developed by a panel of blues scholars and historians. The trail has been implemented in stages as funds have become available. The National Endowment for the Arts, National Endowment for the Humanities, and Mississippi Department of Transportation have provided grants for funding of various markers, which are co-sponsored with funds from local communities. The marker texts are researched and written by Jim O'Neal and Scott Barretta, former editors of Living Blues magazine, together with an editorial and design team that has included Wanda Clark; Chrissy Wilson; Allan Hammons; and Sylvester Oliver.

Prior to the founding of the Mississippi Blues Trail, two preliminary markers were placed in Indianola, Mississippi, at a corner where B.B. King played as a young man, and at the Club Ebony.

The first three Mississippi Blues Trail markers were dedicated on December 11, 2006. The first, at Holly Ridge, is dedicated to Delta blues pioneer Charley Patton.

The second marker is located by the Southern Whispers Restaurant on Nelson Street in Greenville. Nelson Street, the home of many nightclubs, cafes, and juke joints over the years, was once the primary center of African-American business, entertainment, and social life in the Delta. For many decades this historic strip drew crowds to the flourishing club scene to hear Delta blues; big band; jump blues; rhythm & blues; and jazz.

The third marker was unveiled at the original location of WGRM radio station in Greenwood, where B.B. King first broadcast as a gospel singer.

By the end of 2016, the Mississippi Blues Trail had placed nearly 200 markers. They honored individual artists, clubs, record companies, radio stations, and historic events, but also the plantations, streets, cities, and counties that developed as centers of blues activity. Mississippi State Penitentiary at Parchman was also commemorated, as folklorists such as Alan Lomax recorded blues there by inmates (most notably Bukka White) on several occasions, dating to the 1930s.

== Current markers ==
Locations are in Mississippi unless otherwise stated.

Marker name	Marker location	Photograph	Notes
100 Men D.B.A. Hall	Bay St. Louis		
61 Highway	Vicksburg		
Abbay & Leatherman	Robinsonville		Robinsonville is now known as Tunica Resorts, Mississippi
Aberdeen Mississippi Blues	Aberdeen		
Ace Records	Jackson		
Albert King	Indianola		
Alligator Blues	Alligator		
Amory: Blues From A Railroad Town	Amory		
Arthur Crudup	Forest		
B.B. King Birthplace	Berclair		
B.B. King's Roots	Kilmichael		
Baptist Town	Greenwood		
Beale Town Bound	Hernando		
Big Jack Johnson	Clarksdale		
Big Joe Williams	Crawford		
Big Walter Horton	Horn Lake		
Biloxi Blues	Biloxi		
Birthplace Of The Blues?	Dockery Plantation		
Black Prairie Blues	Macon		
Blue Front Cafe	Bentonia		
Blue Room	Vicksburg		
Blues and Jazz in the Pass	Pass Christian		
Blues Deejays	Greenwood		
Blues Legends of Duncan	Duncan		
Bo Diddley	McComb		
Bobby Rush	Jackson		
Broadcasting the Blues	Gulfport		
Brookhaven Blues	Brookhaven		
Bud Scott	Natchez		
Buddy Guy	Lettsworth, Louisiana		
Bukka White	Houston		
Cahors, France	Cahors, France		
Calhoun County Blues	Bruce		
Casey Jones	Water Valley		
Cassandra Wilson	Jackson		
Castro "Mr. Sipp" Coleman	McComb		
Charles Evers	Fayette		
Charley Patton Birthplace	Bolton		
Charley Patton gravesite	Holly Ridge		Blues singers Asie Payton and Willie James Foster are also buried at this cemetery with Charley Patton.
Charlie Musselwhite	Kosciusko		
Choctaw County Blues	Weir		
Chrisman Street	Cleveland		
Church Street	Indianola		
Clinton's Blues Legacy	Clinton		
Club Desire	Canton		
Club Ebony	Indianola		
Columbus - Catfish Alley	Columbus		
Corner of 10 and 61	Leland		
Cotton Pickin Blues	Hopson		
Delta Blues Museum	Clarksdale		
Denise LaSalle	Belzoni		
Documenting The Blues	Oxford		
Dorothy Moore	Jackson		
Ealey Brothers	Natchez		
Eddie Shaw	Benoit		
Eddie Taylor	Benoit		
Edwards Hotel	Jackson		
Elks Hart Lodge No. 640	Greenwood		
Elmore James	Ebenezer		
Elvis Presley and the Blues	Tupelo		
Fred McDowell	Como		Two other Blues Trail markers are in the same area with this marker that honors Othar Turner and Napolian Strickland.
Freedom Village	Greenville		
Furry Lewis	Greenwood		
Gatemouth Moore	Yazoo City		
Gold Coast	Flowood		
Gospel Music and the Blues	Cleveland		Reverend C.L. Franklin, father of R&B singer Aretha Franklin, preached his first trial sermon at St. Peter's Rock M.B. Church, where this Blues Trail marker is located.
Grammy Awards	Los Angeles, California		
Grammy Museum Mississippi	Cleveland		
Greasy Street	Ruleville		
Grenada Blues	Grenada		
Grits & Gravy	Clinton		
Guitar Slim	Shellmound		
Gulfport Boogie	Gulfport		
H. C. Speir	Jackson		
Hal & Mal's	Jackson		
Harlem Inn	Winstonville		
Harold "Hardface" Clanton	Tunica		
Henry Townsend	Shelby		
Hi-Hat Club	Hattiesburg		
Hickory Street (The Hollow)	Canton		
Highway 61 Blues	Robinsonville		
Hill Country Blues	Holly Springs		
Holmes County Blues (Lexington)	Lexington		
Holmes County Blues (Tchula)	Tchula		
HoneyBoy Edwards	Shaw		
Hot Tamales And The Blues	Rosedale		
Houston Stackhouse	Wesson		
Howlin' Wolf	West Point		
Hubert Sumlin	Greenwood		
Ike Turner	Clarksdale		
Ishmon Bracey	Jackson		Ishmon Bracey is buried at Willow Park Cemetery, which is located across the street from the Blues Trail marker.
J.B. Lenoir	Monticello		
Jack Owens	Bentonia		
James Cotton	Clayton		
Jesse Robinson	Jackson		
Jessie Mae Hemphill	Senatobia		Jessie Mae Hemphill is buried at Senatobia Memorial Cemetery.
Jimmie Lunceford	Fulton		
James "Son" Thomas	Leland		
Jimmie Rodgers	Meridian		
Jimmy Reed	Dunleith		
Jimmy Rogers	Ruleville		
Joe Callicott	Nesbit		
John Lee Hooker	Vance		
John Primer	Camden		
Johnny Winter	Leland		
Jones County Blues	Laurel		
Junior Kimbrough	Holly Springs		This is Blues Trail Marker #215, unveiled on February 21, 2024, along with Blues Trail Marker #214 honoring R. L. Burnside.
Lil Green	Port Gibson		
Little Brother Montgomery	Brookhaven		
Little Junior Parker	Bobo		
Little Milton	Inverness		
Liverpool	Liverpool, England		
Livin' at Lula	Lula		
Magic Sam	Grenada		
Magic Slim	Grenada		
Malaco Records	Jackson		
Marcus Bottom	Vicksburg		
McCoy Brothers Kansas Joe McCoy and Papa Charlie McCoy	Raymond		
Mel Brown	Waterloo, Ontario		
Memphis Minnie	Walls		
Meridian Blues and Jazz	Corner of 5th Street & 25th Avenue; Meridian		More than 30 musicians are acknowledged at this marker including Alvin Fielder and Eddie Houston. It is located on the former site of the Fielder & Brooks Pharmacy, which Fielder's father (Alvin Fielder Sr., also a musician) started in 1934.
Meridian R&B and Soul	Meridian		
Mississippi Gulf Coast Blues Festival	Pascagoula		
Mississippi John Hurt	Avalon		
Mississippi River Blues: The 1927 Flood	Scott		
Mississippi to Alabama	Muscle Shoals, Alabama		
Mississippi To Chicago	Chicago, Illinois		
Blues Trail: Mississippi to Florida	Tallahassee, Florida		
Mississippi to Helena	Helena, Arkansas	]	
Mississippi to Louisiana	Ferriday, Louisiana		
Mississippi to Maine	Rockland, Maine		
Mississippi To Memphis	Memphis, Tennessee		
Mose Allison	Tippo		
Mosley & Johnson	New Albany		
Moss Point Blues	Moss Point		
Mound Bayou Blues	Mound Bayou		
Muddy Waters	Rolling Fork		
Muddy Waters' cabin site	Clarksdale		
Napolian Strickland	Como		Two other Blues Trail markers are in the same area with this marker that honors Othar Turner and Fred McDowell.
Natchez Burning (Natchez Rhythm Club)	Natchez		
Nelson Street	Greenville		
Newton County Blues	Newton		This Blues Trail Marker is located near the historic Alabama & Vicksburg Railroad Depot.
Norway	Notodden, Telemark, Norway		
Ocean Springs Blues	Ocean Springs		
Oktibbeha County Blues	Starkville		
Otha Turner	Como		Two other Blues Trail markers are in the same area with this marker that honors Napolian Strickland and Fred McDowell.
Otis Clay	Waxhaw		
Otis Rush	Philadelphia		
Otis Spann & Little Johnny Jones	Jackson		
Overton Park Shell	Memphis, Tennessee		This is the 213th Mississippi Blues Trail marker, dedicated on September 23, 2023
Oxford & Lafayette County Blues	Oxford		
Papa Lightfoot	Natchez		
Paramount Records	Grafton, Wisconsin		
Paramount Records & F.W. Boerner Company	Port Washington, Wisconsin		
Parchman Blues	Parchman		
Peavey Electronics	Meridian		
Peavine	Boyle		
Pensacola Blues	Pensacola, Florida		
Pinetop Perkins	Belzoni		
Piney Woods School	Piney Woods		
Po' Monkey's	Merigold		
Pontotoc County Blues	Pontotoc		
Pops Staples	Winona		
Prince McCoy	Greenville		
Queen City Hotel & 7th Avenue	Columbus		
Queen of Hearts	Jackson		
Rabbit Foot Minstrels	Port Gibson		
Ralph Lembo	Itta Bena		
Rediscovery of Son House	Rochester, New York		
Red Tops	Vicksburg		
Riverside Hotel	Clarksdale		
Riley B. King	Indianola		
R. L. Burnside	Holly Springs		This is Blues Trail Marker #214, unveiled on February 21, 2024, along with Blues Trail Marker #215 honoring Junior Kimbrough.
Robert Johnson birthplace	Hazlehurst		
Robert Johnson gravesite	Greenwood		
Robert Nighthawk	Friars Point		
Rocket "88"	Lyon		
Roma Wilson & Leon Pinson	New Albany		
Roots of Rock And Roll	Hattiesburg		
Rosedale	Rosedale		
Rubin Lacy	Pelahatchie		
Ruby's Nite Spot	Leland		
Rufus Thomas	Cayce		
Sam Chatmon	Hollandale		
Sam Cooke	Clarksdale		
Scott Radio Service Company	Jackson		
Shake Rag	Tupelo		
Sid Hemphill	Senatobia		
Skip James	Bentonia		
Son House	Clack		
Sonny Boy Williamson	Glendora		
Sonny Boy Williamson In Helena	Helena		
Subway Lounge	Jackson		
Summit Street	McComb		
Sunflower River Blues & Gospel Festival	Clarksdale		
Sunnyland Slim: Quitman County Blues	Lambert		
Tate County Blues	Coldwater		
The Alamo Theatre/Dorothy Moore	Jackson		
The B.B. King Museum	Indianola		
The Blues Foundation	Memphis, Tennessee		
The Chatmon Family/Mississippi Sheiks	Bolton		
The Crossroads of 49 & 61	Clarksdale		
The Dickinson Family	Hernando		
The Enlightenment of W.C. Handy	Cleveland		
The Hollywood Cafe	Robinsonville		
The New World	Clarksdale		
The Staple Singers	Drew		
Tommy Johnson	Crystal Springs		
Tommy McClennan	Yazoo City		
Trumpet Records	Jackson		
Turner's Drug Store	Belzoni		
Two Steps From The Blues	Ackerman		Texas Johnny Brown, a native of Ackerman, Mississippi, wrote the blues song "Two Steps from the Blues".
Tyrone Davis	Leland		
W.C. Handy Birthplace	Florence, Alabama		
Wade Walton	Clarksdale		
W.C. Handy Encounters The Blues	Tutwiler		
WGRM Radio Studio	Greenwood		
"Where The Southern Cross The Dog"	Moorhead		
William R. Ferris	Vicksburg		
Willie Dixon	Vicksburg		
Willie Mitchell	Ashland		
Woodville Blues	Woodville		
WROX	Clarksdale		

Source: Mississippi Blues Trail official web site

== See also ==
- Delta Blues Museum
