= Jack Owens (blues singer) =

American Delta blues singer and guitarist

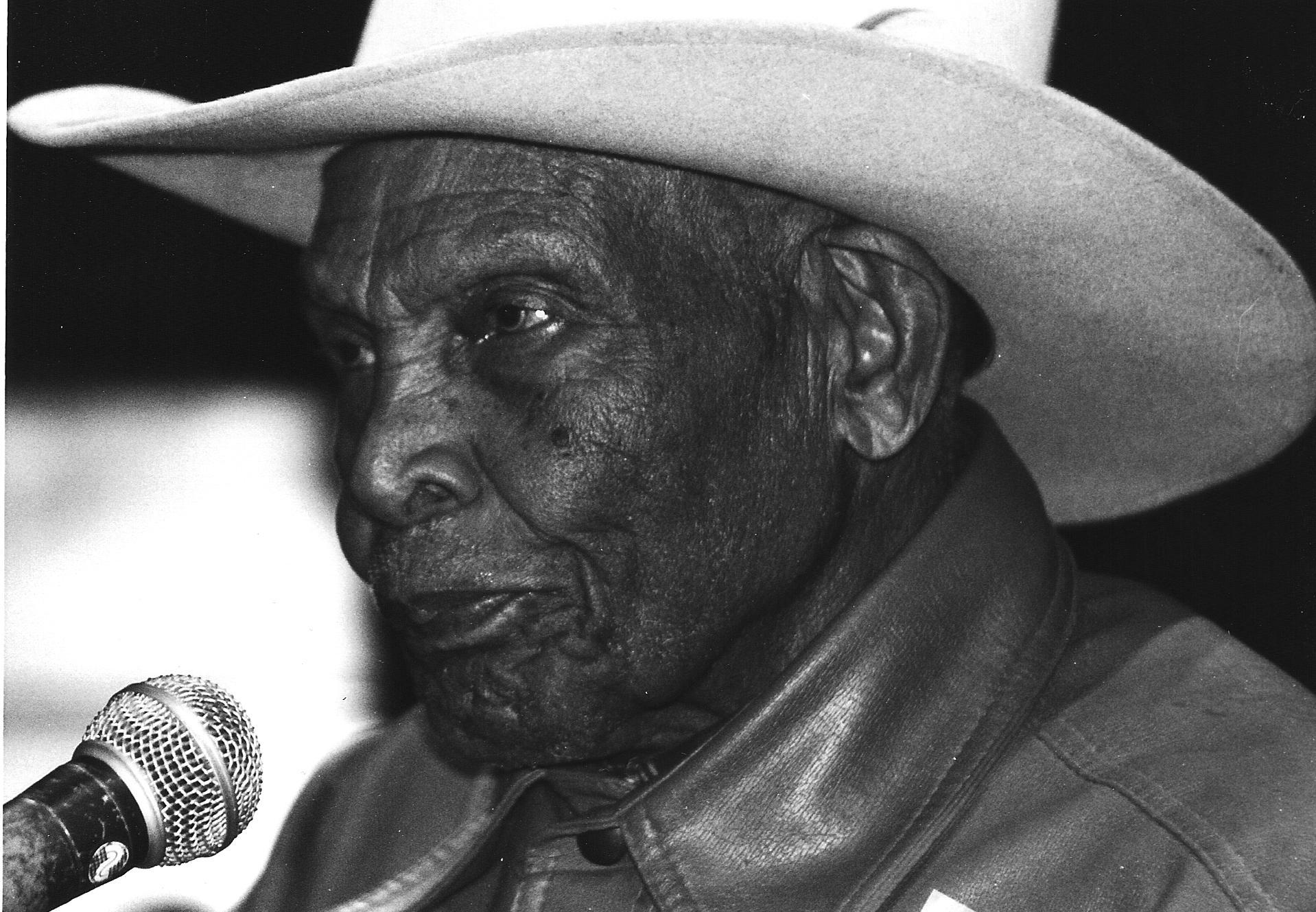
- Owens performing at the Utrecht Blues Estafette, 1995 (photograph: Phil Wight)

Background information
- Born: L. F. Nelson; November 17, 1904; Bentonia, Mississippi, U.S.
- Died: February 9, 1997 (aged 92) Yazoo City, Mississippi, U.S.
- Genres: Delta blues, Bentonia School, rhythm and blues roots, gospel
- Occupations: Musician, songwriter, farmer
- Instruments: Vocals, guitar, piano, fife, fiddle
- Years active: 1970–1997
- Labels: Testament Records (USA), others

Jack Owens (November 17, 1904 – February 9, 1997) was an American blues singer and guitarist, from Bentonia, Mississippi.

== Biography ==
Owens was born L. F. Nelson. His mother was Celia Owens; his father was George Nelson, who abandoned his family when Jack was 5 or 6 years old. After that time, he was raised by the Owens family with his maternal grandfather, the father of eight children, according to the 1910 census, two of whom shared the Nelson name. (This does not account for two more children born after that census.) While very young, Owens learned some chords on the guitar from his father and an uncle. He also learned to play the fife, fiddle, and piano while still a child, but his chosen instrument was the guitar.

Owens did not seek to become a professional recording artist. He farmed, sold bootleg liquor, and ran a weekend juke joint in Bentonia for most of his life. His peer, Skip James, had left home and traveled until he found a talent agent and a record label to sign him, but Owens preferred to remain at home, selling liquor and performing only on his front porch. He was not recorded until the blues revival of the 1960s, having been rediscovered in 1966 by the musicologist David Evans, who was taken to meet Owens by either Skip James or Cornelius Bright. Evans noted that while James and Owens had many elements in common and a sound peculiar to that region, referred to as the Bentonia School, there were also strong differences in Owens's delivery. James, Owens, Bukka White, and others from the area shared a particular guitar style and repertoire utilizing open D-minor tuning (DADFAD). Owens, though, experimented with several other tunings, which appear to have been his own. He played guitar and sang, utilizing the stomp of his boots for rhythm in the manner of some other players in the Mississippi Delta, such as John Lee Hooker. James used falsetto in his singing and had become accustomed to singing quietly for recording sessions, but Owens sang roughly in his usual singing voice and loud enough for people at a party to hear while dancing. Evans, excited to find a piece of history in Owens, made recordings of him singing, which were included on Owens's first record album, Goin' Up the Country, that same year, and on It Must Have Been the Devil (with Bud Spires) in 1970. Owens made other recordings (some by Alan Lomax) in the 1960s and 1970s.

Owens travelled the music festival circuit in the United States and Europe in the last decades of his life, often accompanied on harmonica by his friend Bud Spires, until his death in 1997. He was frequently billed in the company of other noteworthy blues musicians who maintained a higher profile than he did but were longtime associates. One such performance was with Spires in an all-star tribute to Chess Records in 1994 at the Long Beach Blues Festival, along with Jeff Healey, Hubert Sumlin, Buddy Guy, the Staple Singers and Robert Cray's band, among others, in Long Beach, California.

He was a recipient of a 1993 National Heritage Fellowship awarded by the National Endowment for the Arts, which is the highest honor in the folk and traditional arts in the United States.

Owens died in Yazoo City, Mississippi, in 1997, at the age of 92. He is buried at Old Liberty Mission Baptist Church, Bentonia, Mississippi.

== Discography ==
- It Must Have Been The Devil (1971, Testament Records)
- Bentonia Country Blues (1979, Albatross Records)

== Films ==
- Deep Blues (1991), directed by Robert Mugge
