= Ruby, Leflore County, Mississippi =

Ruby, Mississippi
- Unincorporated community
- Location within Mississippi Location within the United States
- Coordinates: 33°41′41″N 90°13′40″W
- Country: United States
- State: Mississippi
- County: Leflore
- Elevation: 138 ft (42 m)
- Time zone: UTC-6 (Central (CST))
  - Summer (DST): UTC-5 (CDT)
- ZIP code: 38952
- Area code: 662
- GNIS feature ID: 692191

Ruby (also known as Geren), is an unincorporated community in Leflore County, Mississippi. Ruby is located near the Tallahatchie River, 12.5 miles (20.1 km) north-northwest of Greenwood, 3.3 miles (5.3 km) north of Money and 6.6 miles (10.6 km) south-southwest of Philipp.

Ruby is located on the Canadian National Railway. A post office operated under the name Geren from 1901 to 1955.

The Railway Express Agency serviced Ruby until 1933.
