= Bill Barth =

American blues guitarist (1942–2000)

- Also known as: Josiah Jones
- Born: William Henry Barth; December 13, 1942; New York, United States
- Died: July 14, 2000 (aged 57) Amsterdam, Netherlands
- Genres: Folk rock, folk, blues, rock, psychedelic rock
- Instruments: Steel guitar, guitar
- Labels: Blue Thumb Records, Arhoolie
- Formerly of: John Fahey, The Holy Modal Rounders

William Henry Barth (December 13, 1942, New York City – July 14, 2000, Amsterdam, Netherlands) was an American blues guitarist who, along with John Fahey and Henry Vestine, located 1930s blues great Skip James in a hospital in Tunica, Mississippi in 1964.

== The Insect Trust ==
In the late 1960s Barth was a founding member of the band The Insect Trust.

== Memphis Country Blues Society ==
Barth co-founded the Memphis Country Blues Society, a non-profit organization dedicated to the preservation and promotion of the Delta blues. With the Country Blues Society, Bill produced four festivals between 1966 and 1969 featuring artists such as Furry Lewis, Gus Cannon, Bukka White, Sleepy John Estes, Yank Rachell and Fred McDowell.

== Discography ==
- 1969 Memphis Swamp Jam (originally on Blue Thumb Records, later reissued on the Arhoolie label: Three guitar duets by John Fahey, and Bill Barth, using the pseudonyms of R L Watson and Josiah Jones)
- 1971-74 'On The Road Again' Country Blues 1969-1974 (FLYCD58 Interstate Music) Bill backs various blues musicians on tracks 13,14 and plays second guitar with Lum Guffin on track 16.
- John Fahey Vol. III: The Dance of Death & Other Plantation Favorites (TAKOMA C 1004) Duet with Fahey on track 3, "On the Banks of the Owchita". Barth recorded other tracks with Fahey which were not used.

=== With The Insect Trust ===
- 1969 The Insect Trust
- 1970 Hoboken Saturday Night
