= Juke joint =

African-American establishments in the U.S. South

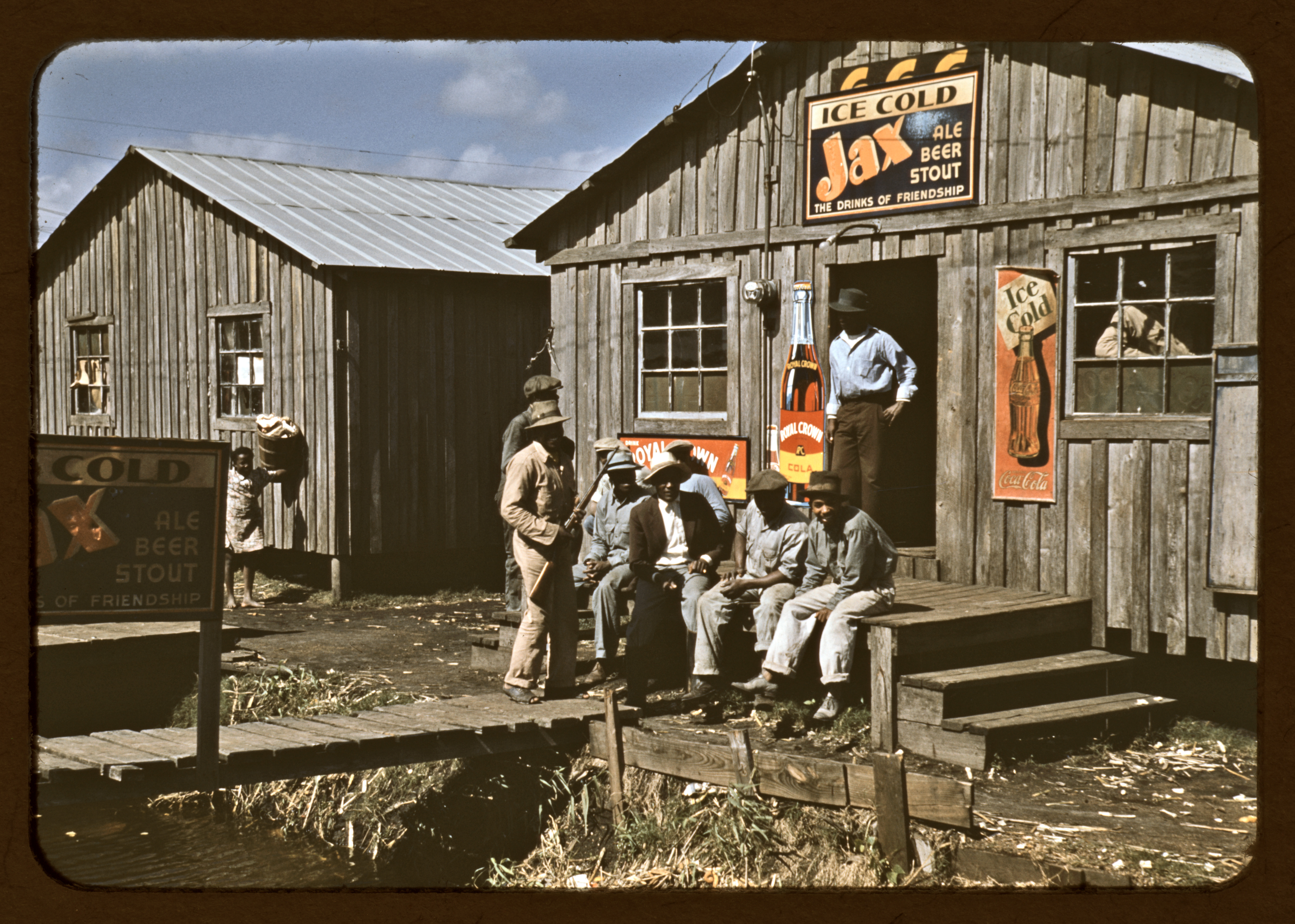
Exterior of a juke joint in Belle Glade, Florida, photographed by Marion Post Wolcott in 1941

Juke joint (also jukejoint, jook house, jook, or juke) is the African-American vernacular term for an informal establishment featuring music, dancing, gambling, and drinking, primarily operated by African Americans in the southeastern United States. A juke joint may also be called a "barrelhouse". Juke joints were the first secular cultural arenas to emerge among African-American freedmen.

Classic juke joints, found for example at rural crossroads, catered to the rural work force that began to emerge after emancipation. Plantation workers and sharecroppers needed a place to relax and socialize following a hard week, particularly since they were barred from most white establishments by Jim Crow laws.

Set up on the outskirts of town, often in ramshackle, abandoned buildings or private houses, juke joints offered food, drink, dancing, and gambling for weary workers. Owners made extra money selling groceries or moonshine to patrons, or providing cheap room and board.

== Etymology ==
The term juke is believed to come from the Gullah word joog or jug, meaning rowdy or disorderly, which itself is derived from the Wolof word dzug meaning to misconduct one's self.

== History ==
Dancing at a juke joint outside Clarksdale, Mississippi, in 1939

The origins of juke joints may be the community rooms that were occasionally built on plantations to provide a place for black people to socialize during slavery. This practice spread to the work camps such as sawmills, turpentine camps and lumber companies in the early twentieth century, which built barrel-houses and chock-houses to be used for drinking and gambling. Although uncommon in populated areas, such places were often seen as necessary to attract workers to sparsely populated areas lacking bars and other social outlets. Also, much like "on-base" officer's clubs, such "company"-owned joints allowed managers to keep an eye on their underlings; it also ensured that the employees' pay was coming back to the company. Constructed simply like a field hand's "shotgun"-style dwelling, these may have been the first juke joints.

During the Prohibition era, it became common to see squalid independent juke joints at highway crossings and railroad stops. These were almost never called "juke joints," but rather were called by names such as "Lone Star" or "Colored Cafe". They were often open only on weekends.

Juke joints may be considered the first "private space" for black people in the United States. Paul Oliver writes that juke joints were "the last retreat, the final bastion for black people who want to get away from whites, and the pressures of the day." Juke joints occurred on plantations, and classic juke joints found, for example, at rural crossroads began to emerge after the Emancipation Proclamation. At the beginning of the twentieth century, the fiddle was the most popular instrument for Southern musicians, white and black alike. The fiddle-based music that was played for slaves at their dances formed the foundation of much of what is now termed "old-timey" or "hillbilly" country music. These dances were often referred to at the time as jigs and reels; Elijah Wald notes that there were "terms routinely used for any dance that struck respectable people as wild or unrestrained, whether Irish or African." The banjo was popular before guitars became widely available in the 1890s.

Juke joint music began with the blues, then Black folk rags ("ragtime stuff" and "folk rags" are a catch-all term for older African American music) and then the boogie woogie dance music of the late 1880s or 1890s, which influenced the blues, barrel house, and the slow drag dance music of the rural South (moving to Chicago's Black rent-party circuit in the Great Migration), often "raucous and raunchy" good time secular music. Dance forms evolved from group dances to solo and couples dancing. Some Black people opposed the amorality of the raucous "jook crowd".

Until the advent of the Victrola, and juke boxes, at least one musician was required to provide music for dancing, but as many as three musicians would play in juke joints. In larger cities like New Orleans, string trios or quartets were hired.

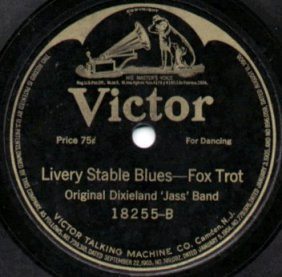
Label of 78-rpm gramophone record of "Livery Stable Blues – Fox Trot" (1917)

Musicians during the juke joint era were stylistically quite versatile, with much overlap between genres. Mance Lipscomb, Texas guitarist and singer, described the style of the time: "So far as what was called blues, that didn't come till 'round 1917...What we had in my coming up days was music for dancing, and it was of all different sorts."

Paul Oliver, who wrote in 1970 of a visit to a juke joint outside of Clarksdale where he was the only white man present, describes juke joints of the time as "unappealing, decrepit, crumbling shacks" that were often so small that only a few couples could Hully Gully. The outside yard was filled with trash. Inside they were "dusty" and "squalid" with the walls "stained to shoulder height".

In 1934, anthropologist Zora Neale Hurston made the first formal attempt to describe the juke joint and its cultural role, writing that "the Negro jooks...are primitive rural counterparts of resort night clubs, where turpentine workers take their evening relaxation deep in the pine forests." Jukes figure prominently in her studies of African American folklore.

Early figures of blues, including Robert Johnson, Son House, Charley Patton, and countless others, traveled the juke joint circuit, scraping out a living on tips and free meals. While musicians played, patrons enjoyed dances with long heritages in some parts of the African American community, such as the slow drag.

Many of the early and historic juke joints have closed over the past decades for a number of socio-economic reasons. Po' Monkey's, one of the last remaining rural jukes in the Mississippi Delta, closed in 2016 after the death of its owner. It began as a renovated sharecropper's shack which was probably originally built in the 1920s or so. Po' Monkey's featured live blues music and "Family Night" on Thursdays. Run by Willie "Po' Monkey" Seaberry until his death in 2016, the popular juke joint had been featured in national and international articles about the Delta. The Blue Front Cafe is a historic old juke joint made of cinder blocks in Bentonia, Mississippi which played an important role in the development of the blues in Mississippi. It was still in operation as of 2006. Smitty's Red Top Lounge in Clarksdale, Mississippi, is also still operating as of last notice.

Juke joints are still a strong part of African American culture in Deep South locations such as the Mississippi Delta where blues is still the mainstay, although it is now more often featured by disc jockeys and on jukeboxes than by live bands.

== Urban juke joint ==
Peter Guralnick describes many Chicago juke joints as corner bars that go by an address and have no name. The musicians and singers perform unannounced and without microphones, ending with little if any applause. Guralnick tells of a visit to a specific juke joint, Florence's, in 1977. In stark contrast to the streets outside, Florence's is dim, and smoke-filled with the music more of an accompaniment to the "various business" being conducted than the focus of the patrons' attention. The "sheer funk of all those closely-packed-together bodies, the shouts and laughter" draws his attention. He describes the security measures and buzzer at the door, there having been a shooting there a few years ago. On this particular day Magic Slim was performing with his band, the Teardrops, on a bandstand barely big enough to hold the band.

Katrina Hazzard-Gordon writes that "[t]he honky-tonk was the first urban manifestation of the jook, and the name itself later became synonymous with a style of music. Related to the classic blues in tonal structure, honky-tonk has a tempo that is slightly stepped up. It is rhythmically suited for many African-American dances…", but cites no reference.

== Legacy ==
The allure of juke joints has inspired many large-scale commercial establishments, including the House of Blues chain and the Ground Zero in Clarksdale, Mississippi. Traditional juke joints, however, are under some pressure from other forms of entertainment, including casinos.

Jukes have been celebrated in photos and film. Marion Post Wolcott's images of the dilapidated buildings and the pulsing life they contained are among the most famous documentary images of the era. Juke joints are featured prominently in the movies The Color Purple, The Great Debaters, and Sinners.

== See also ==
- Delta blues
- Junior Kimbrough
- List of public house topics
