= Bentonia, Mississippi =

- Town
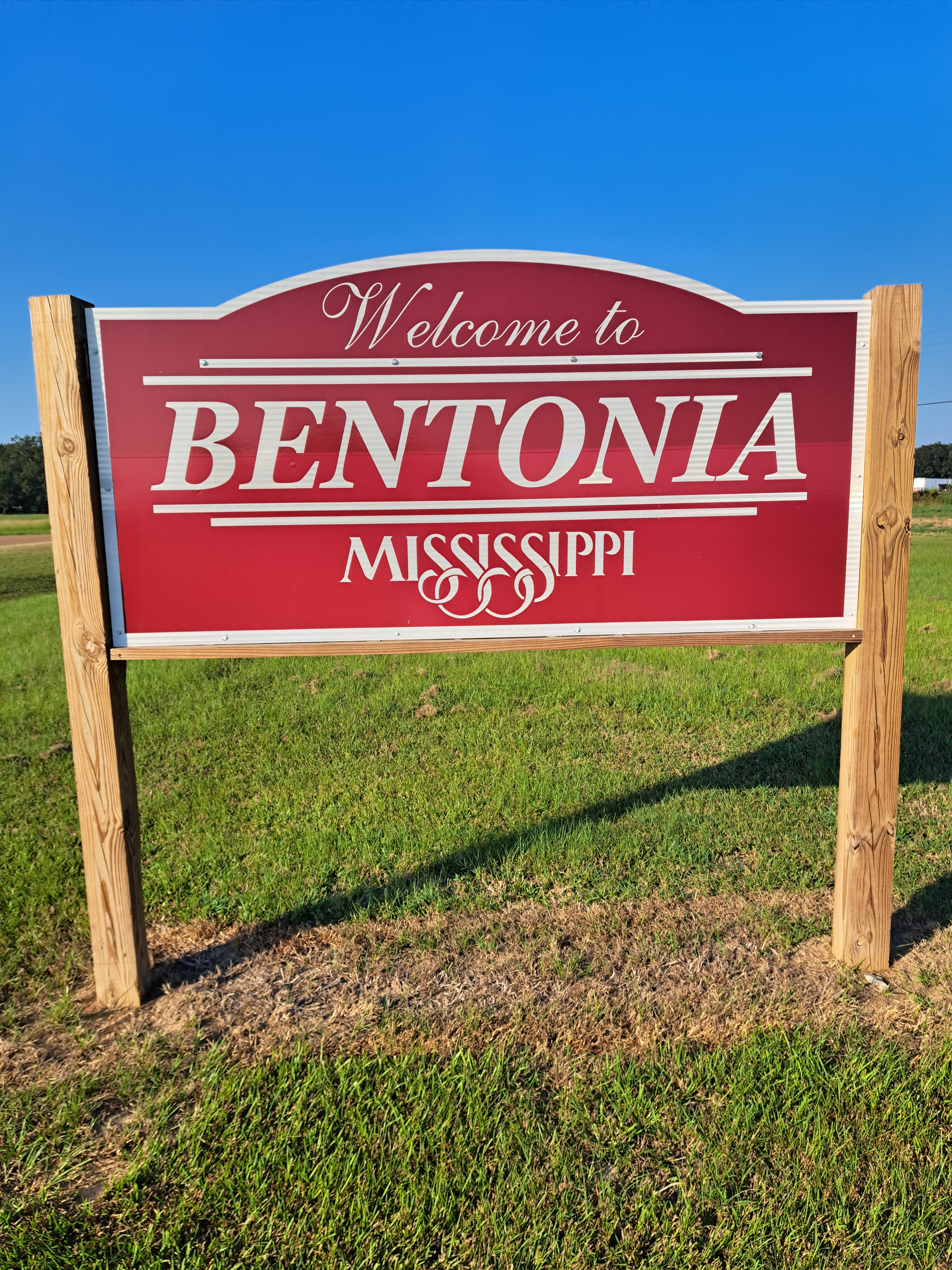
- Welcome Sign in Bentonia

- Location of Bentonia, Mississippi

- Location in the United States
- Coordinates: 32°38′46″N 90°22′20″W
- Country: United States
- State: Mississippi
- County: Yazoo

Area
  - Total: 1.42 sq mi (3.69 km^{2})
  - Land: 1.42 sq mi (3.69 km^{2})
  - Water: 0 sq mi (0.00 km^{2})
- Elevation: 197 ft (60 m)

Population (2020)
  - Total: 319
  - Density: 224.0/sq mi (86.47/km^{2})
- Time zone: UTC-6 (Central (CST))
  - Summer (DST): UTC-5 (CDT)
- ZIP code: 39040
- Area code: 662
- FIPS code: 28-05380
- GNIS feature ID: 2405246
- Website: townofbentonia.org

Bentonia is a town in Yazoo County, Mississippi, United States. The population as of the 2020 census was 319.

The Bentonia School of blues singing and guitar-playing is named for Bentonia.

== History ==
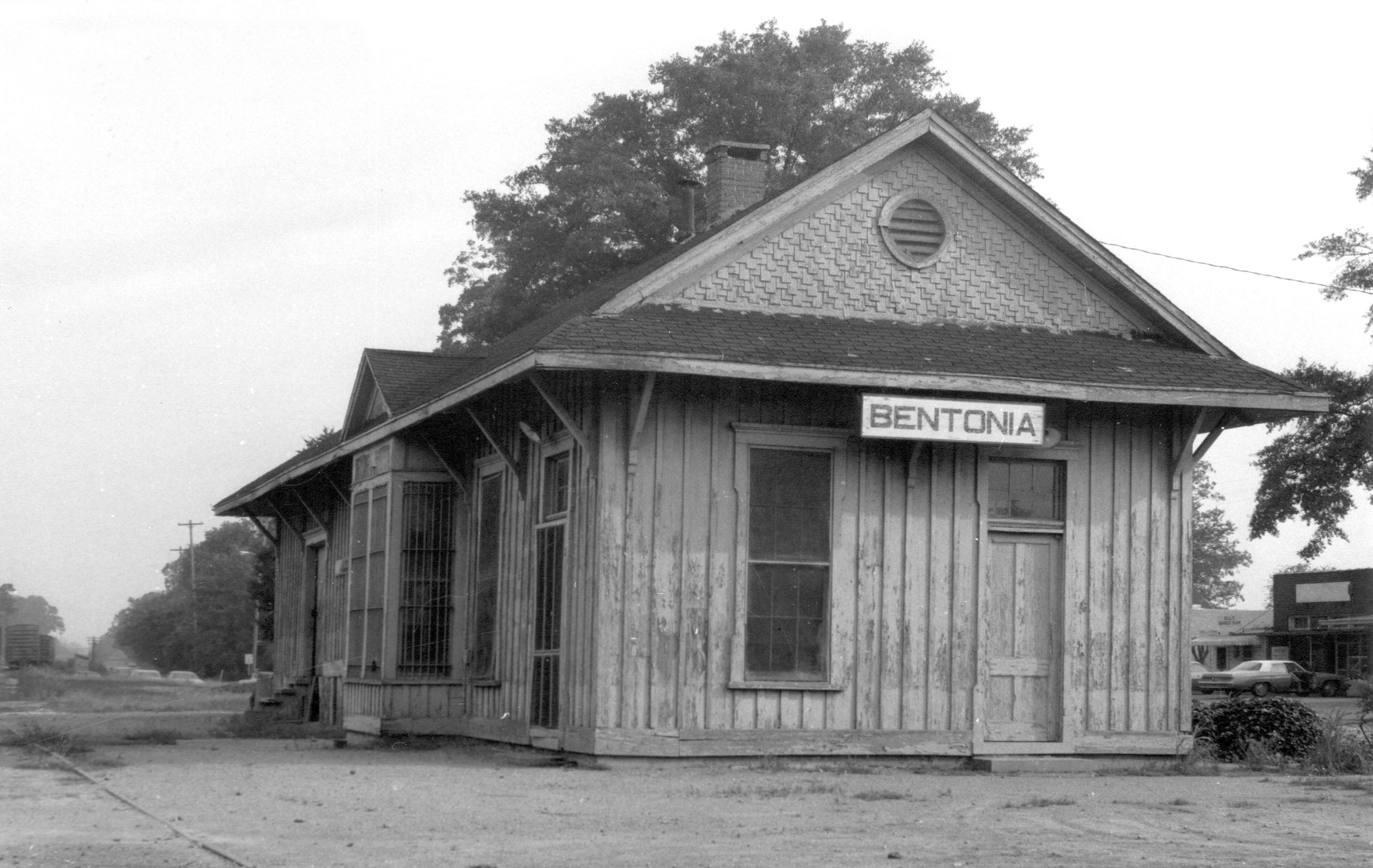
Illinois Central Railroad depot in Bentonia

Bentonia began as a postal town along the Illinois Central Railroad. It is named for an early resident. Bentonia had a population of 167 in 1900.

=== Bentonia Blues ===
The Bentonia School, "Bentonia-style" or "Bentonia Blues" describe a country blues style that originated in and immediately around Bentonia. The annual Bentonia Blues Festival is held in June in Bentonia. The festival's stage is set up in front of the Blue Front Cafe, which is operated by Jimmy "Duck" Holmes who, as a young man, learned the local style from Bentonia Blues musician Jack Owens.

Three markers on the Mississippi Blues Trail are located in Bentonia: one each to musicians Skip James and Jack Owens, and one located at the Blue Front Café.

== Geography ==
According to the United States Census Bureau, the town has a total area of 1.4 square miles (3.6 km^{2}), all land.

== Demographics ==
Historical population
Census	Pop.	Note	%±
1880	180		—
1940	440		—
1950	496		12.7%
1960	511		3.0%
1970	544		6.5%
1980	518		−4.8%
1990	390		−24.7%
2000	500		28.2%
2010	440		−12.0%
2020	319		−27.5%
U.S. Decennial Census; 2010 2020

=== 2020 census ===
Bentonia town, Mississippi – Demographic Profile (NH = Non-Hispanic)
Race / Ethnicity	Pop 2010	Pop 2020	% 2010	% 2020
White alone (NH)	286	201	65.00%	63.01%
Black or African American alone (NH)	148	92	33.64%	28.84%
Native American or Alaska Native alone (NH)	0	0	0.00%	0.00%
Asian alone (NH)	0	1	0.00%	0.31%
Pacific Islander alone (NH)	0	0	0.00%	0.00%
Some Other Race alone (NH)	1	0	0.23%	0.00%
Mixed Race/Multi-Racial (NH)	3	25	0.68%	7.84%
Hispanic or Latino (any race)	2	0	0.45%	0.00%
Total	440	319	100.00%	100.00%

Note: the US Census treats Hispanic/Latino as an ethnic category. This table excludes Latinos from the racial categories and assigns them to a separate category. Hispanics/Latinos can be of any race.

=== 2000 Census ===
Bentonia's largest population count, 544, was recorded in 1970. Bentonia had sixty fewer residents in 2010 compared to 2000, and the 2015 estimate is another fourteen fewer. As of the census of 2000, there were 500 people, 203 households, and 130 families residing in the town. The population density was 366.0 inhabitants per square mile (141.3/km^{2}). There were 214 housing units at an average density of 156.6 per square mile (60.5/km^{2}). The racial makeup of the town was 62.80% White, 35.80% African American, 0.20% Asian, 0.20% from other races, and 1.00% from two or more races. Hispanic or Latino of any race were 0.40% of the population.

There were 203 households, out of which 29.6% had children under the age of 18 living with them, 38.9% were married couples living together, 21.7% had a female householder with no husband present, and 35.5% were non-families. 33.5% of all households were made up of individuals, and 16.3% had someone living alone who was 65 years of age or older. The average household size was 2.46 and the average family size was 3.15.

In the town, the population was spread out, with 25.2% under the age of 18, 7.8% from 18 to 24, 25.6% from 25 to 44, 23.8% from 45 to 64, and 17.6% who were 65 years of age or older. The median age was 40 years. For every 100 females, there were 79.9 males. For every 100 females age 18 and over, there were 76.4 males.

The median income for a household in the town was $21,458, and the median income for a family was $39,583. Males had a median income of $28,000 versus $26,875 for females. The per capita income for the town was $12,440. About 23.3% of families and 27.4% of the population were below the poverty line, including 36.5% of those under age 18 and 22.2% of those age 65 or over.

== Transportation ==
Amtrak's City of New Orleans, which operates between New Orleans and Chicago, passes through the town on CN tracks, but makes no stop. The nearest station is located in Yazoo City, 16 miles (26 km) to the north.

== Education ==
The Town of Bentonia is served by the Yazoo County School District. Residents are zoned to Bentonia Gibbs Elementary School, Yazoo County Middle School, and Yazoo County High School.

== Notable people ==
- Jimmy "Duck" Holmes, blues musician
- Skip James, blues musician
- Jack Owens, blues musician
- James Steels, former outfielder for the San Diego Padres.
