= Leflore County, Mississippi =

County in Mississippi, United States

- County
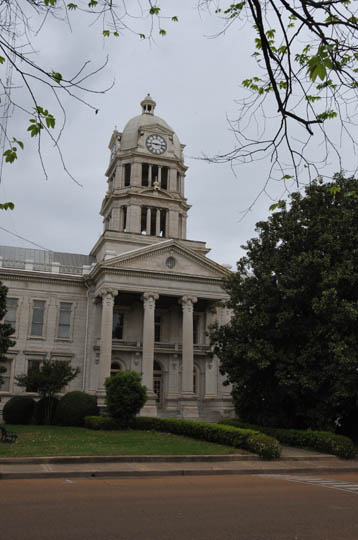
- Leflore County Courthouse

- Location within the U.S. state of Mississippi
- Coordinates: 33°33′N 90°18′W
- Country: United States
- State: Mississippi
- Founded: 1871
- Named for: Greenwood LeFlore
- Seat: Greenwood
- Largest city: Greenwood

Area
  - Total: 606 sq mi (1,570 km^{2})
  - Land: 593 sq mi (1,540 km^{2})
  - Water: 14 sq mi (36 km^{2}) 2.3%

Population (2020)
  - Total: 28,339
  - Estimate (2025): 25,686 ▼
  - Density: 47.8/sq mi (18.5/km^{2})
- Time zone: UTC−6 (Central)
  - Summer (DST): UTC−5 (CDT)
- Congressional district: 2nd
- Website: www.leflorecounty.ms

Leflore County is a county located in the U.S. state of Mississippi. As of the 2020 census, the population was 28,339. The county seat is Greenwood. The county is named for Choctaw leader Greenwood LeFlore, who signed a treaty to cede his people's land to the United States in exchange for land in Indian Territory. LeFlore stayed in Mississippi, settling on land reserved for him in Tallahatchie County.

Leflore County is part of the Greenwood, MS Micropolitan Statistical Area. It is located in the Mississippi Delta region, with its southern border formed by the Yazoo River. Its riverfront lands were developed before the Civil War as cotton plantations. More inland areas were developed in the later 19th century.

Leflore County, which is still largely rural, is noted for having the highest level of child poverty of any county in the United States. Mechanization of agriculture reduced jobs available for many workers in the 20th century, and there are few opportunities. The population has declined dramatically since its peak in 1930 as people continue to leave for opportunities elsewhere.

== History ==
Leflore County was formed in 1871 during the Reconstruction era from portions of Carroll, Sunflower and Tallahatchie counties. It was named for Greenwood LeFlore, a Choctaw chief. During the period of Indian Removal in the 1830s, he was one of the chiefs who signed the Treaty of Dancing Creek of 1830, by the terms of which the Choctaw sold to the US their remaining lands east of the Mississippi River. Most Choctaw migrated to the Indian Territory (now Oklahoma), but Leflore and some others remained in Mississippi. He became a state and US citizen, a planter who owned African-American slaves, and at times served as a politician.

Following the American Civil War, during Reconstruction the majority-black population of freedmen in the county gained emancipation and suffrage, participating for the first time in formal politics. They supported the Republican Party, as President Abraham Lincoln had gained their freedom. In the mid-1870s, the Red Shirts, a white paramilitary organization working on behalf of the Democratic Party, developed chapters in Mississippi. They worked to disrupt Republican meetings, suppress the black vote, and turn Republicans out of office so that white Democrats could regain control of the state legislature.

One particular act of mass violence stands out: In September 1889, organizing by the Colored Farmers' Alliance sparked false rumors of an impending Black "uprising." Mississippi Governor Robert Lowry ordered the state militia to Leflore County. Militia troops killed an estimated 25 Black people.

In the period from 1877 to 1950, Leflore County had 48 documented lynchings of African Americans, by far the highest number in the state and third highest in the United States. Most occurred around the turn of the 20th century, as part of white imposition of Jim Crow conditions and suppression of black voting. Mississippi had more lynchings than any other state and used violence as a means to terrorize and retain control the African-American population. In 1890 the state legislature passed a new constitution that had a variety of devices to disenfranchise blacks; they developed ways around court cases that tried to dismantle these, and kept blacks excluded from the political system and racially segregated into the 1960s.

=== 20th century to present ===
In the first half of the 20th century, many blacks left rural counties such as Leflore, in the Great Migration to northern and midwestern industrial cities to escape racial violence, and in search of jobs and education: many people went north by train to Chicago, taking their music with them and changing the big city forever. Many more people left Mississippi from 1940 to 1970, often migrating to the West Coast for defense industry jobs.

As with other parts of the majority-black Delta, Leflore County was a major site of activism and white violence during the Civil Rights Movement. In 1955, the events leading up to the lynching of 14-year-old Emmett Till unfolded in the unincorporated community of Money, Mississippi. Till, a teenage African-American, was visiting from Chicago and staying with relatives in Money, where Bryant's Grocery and Meat Market was located. Here Till encountered Carolyn Bryant, who later said that he had behaved flirtatiously toward her. Bryant's husband, Roy Bryant, and another white man, J.W. Milam, abducted Till later that evening. They beat and tortured him at several locations in Leflore and neighboring counties before shooting him and dumping his body in the river in Tallahatchie County, Mississippi. Bryant and Milam were acquitted by an all-white jury of Till's murder at the Tallahatchie County Courthouse, in Sumner, Mississippi.

During a 2007 interview, not made public until 2017, Carolyn Bryant had disclosed that she had fabricated her testimony about Till's actions.

In 1963, the county had more than 13,000 blacks of legal voting age, but fewer than 270 were registered because of discrimination and suppression by whites. Blacks had been essentially disfranchised since implementation of Mississippi's new constitution in 1890, establishing poll taxes, literacy tests and other voter registration barriers. Meanwhile, 95% of eligible white voters were registered.

The Student Nonviolent Coordinating Committee had moved its headquarters to Greenwood in early 1963, and by late March of that year, eight SNCC members were arrested while trying to register voters. The United States Department of Justice Civil Rights Division filed suit against the city of Greenwood and Leflore County to obtain their release. The petition was denied by a local court, but the city of Greenwood entered into a voluntary agreement to release the students. In June 1963, 45 residents of Itta Bena were arrested in Leflore County while protesting an attack on churches where voter registration drives were being held. The Civil Rights Division of DOJ filed suit against the county to obtain their release as well, but to no avail. Passage of national civil rights legislation by Congress in 1964 and 1965 began to change the ground rules, especially as it authorized federal oversight and enforcement in counties with a history of an under-representation of minority voters.

Organizers and marchers returned to the county in 1966 as part of the March Against Fear, initiated by James Meredith. He was shot and wounded by a white man two days into the march. Major civil rights leaders and marchers from a variety of organizations vowed to continue his march of more than 220 miles from Memphis, Tennessee to Jackson, Mississippi. By the time they reached Greenwood, several hundred persons were in the group. They worked to organize and register voters, as most blacks in the county still lived in fear and had not registered. After previous registration drives, the white county board had cut off federal commodity subsidies to the black community, threatening the survival of numerous poor families. SNCC helped organize a national gathering of food for county residents to overcome the boycott.

In 1966, Stokeley Carmichael, a new leader of SNCC, spoke in Greenwood for "Black Power", saying that blacks had to build their own bases of political and economic power, as had communities of Irish, Italian and Jewish immigrants to the United States.

== Blues musicians ==
L.C. Green was one of several notable blues guitarists who came from Leflore County, Mississippi. Other notable natives and one-time residents of the county were (in alphabetical order) David "Honeyboy" Edwards, Guitar Slim, Richard "Hacksaw" Harney, Luther "Guitar Junior" Johnson, Robert Johnson, Rubin Lacey, Furry Lewis, Tommy McClennan, Dion Payton, Robert Petway, Brewer Phillips, Fenton Robinson, Hubert Sumlin, and Hound Dog Taylor.

== Geography ==
According to the U.S. Census Bureau, the county has a total area of 606 square miles (1,570 km^{2}), of which 593 square miles (1,540 km^{2}) is land and 14 square miles (36 km^{2}) (2.3%) is water.

=== Major highways ===
- U.S. Route 49E
- U.S. Route 82
- Mississippi Highway 7
- Mississippi Highway 8

=== Adjacent counties ===
- Tallahatchie County (north)
- Grenada County (northeast)
- Carroll County (east)
- Holmes County (southeast)
- Humphreys County (southwest)
- Sunflower County (west)

=== National protected area ===
- Mathews Brake National Wildlife Refuge
- Theodore Roosevelt National Wildlife Refuge (part)

== Demographics ==
Historical population
Census	Pop.	Note	%±
1880	10,246		—
1890	16,869		64.6%
1900	23,834		41.3%
1910	36,290		52.3%
1920	37,256		2.7%
1930	53,506		43.6%
1940	53,406		−0.2%
1950	51,813		−3.0%
1960	47,142		−9.0%
1970	42,111		−10.7%
1980	41,525		−1.4%
1990	37,341		−10.1%
2000	37,947		1.6%
2010	32,317		−14.8%
2020	28,339		−12.3%
2025 (est.)	25,686	▼	−9.4%
U.S. Decennial Census; 1790-1960 1900-1990; 1990-2000 2010-2013

=== Racial and ethnic composition ===
Leflore County, Mississippi – Racial and ethnic composition Note: the US Census treats Hispanic/Latino as an ethnic category. This table excludes Latinos from the racial categories and assigns them to a separate category. Hispanics/Latinos may be of any race.
Race / Ethnicity (NH = Non-Hispanic)	Pop 1980	Pop 1990	Pop 2000	Pop 2010	Pop 2020	% 1980	% 1990	% 2000	% 2010	% 2020
White alone (NH)	16,635	14,471	11,238	7,930	5,963	40.06%	38.75%	29.61%	24.54%	21.04%
Black or African American alone (NH)	24,252	22,572	25,526	23,246	20,809	58.40%	60.45%	67.27%	71.93%	73.43%
Native American or Alaska Native alone (NH)	18	23	42	39	15	0.04%	0.06%	0.11%	0.12%	0.05%
Asian alone (NH)	197	124	244	183	205	0.47%	0.33%	0.64%	0.57%	0.72%
Native Hawaiian or Pacific Islander alone (NH)	x	x	15	2	0	x	x	0.04%	0.01%	0.00%
Other race alone (NH)	11	5	10	11	26	0.03%	0.01%	0.03%	0.03%	0.09%
Mixed race or Multiracial (NH)	x	x	152	163	481	x	x	0.40%	0.50%	1.70%
Hispanic or Latino (any race)	412	146	720	743	840	0.99%	0.39%	1.90%	2.30%	2.96%
Total	41,525	37,341	37,947	32,317	28,339	100.00%	100.00%	100.00%	100.00%	100.00%

=== 2020 census ===
As of the 2020 census, the county had a population of 28,339. The median age was 36.6 years. 25.9% of residents were under the age of 18 and 16.0% of residents were 65 years of age or older. For every 100 females there were 88.2 males, and for every 100 females age 18 and over there were 84.4 males age 18 and over.

The racial makeup of the county was 21.2% White, 73.7% Black or African American, 0.1% American Indian and Alaska Native, 0.7% Asian, <0.1% Native Hawaiian and Pacific Islander, 2.1% from some other race, and 2.1% from two or more races. Hispanic or Latino residents of any race comprised 3.0% of the population.

68.7% of residents lived in urban areas, while 31.3% lived in rural areas.

There were 11,058 households in the county, of which 34.0% had children under the age of 18 living in them. Of all households, 27.0% were married-couple households, 21.1% were households with a male householder and no spouse or partner present, and 45.9% were households with a female householder and no spouse or partner present. About 33.2% of all households were made up of individuals and 13.4% had someone living alone who was 65 years of age or older.

There were 12,632 housing units, of which 12.5% were vacant. Among occupied housing units, 49.7% were owner-occupied and 50.3% were renter-occupied. The homeowner vacancy rate was 1.9% and the rental vacancy rate was 10.6%.

=== 2010 census ===
As of the 2010 United States census, there were 32,317 people living in the county. 72.2% were Black or African American, 24.9% White, 0.6% Asian, 0.2% Native American, 1.5% of some other race and 0.6% of two or more races. 2.3% were Hispanic or Latino (of any race).

=== 2000 census ===
As of the census of 2000, there were 37,947 people, 12,956 households, and 8,887 families living in the county. The population density was 64 inhabitants per square mile (25/km^{2}). There were 14,097 housing units at an average density of 24 per square mile (9.3/km^{2}). The racial makeup of the county was 67.73% Black or African American, 30.00% White, 0.11% Native American, 0.65% Asian, 0.04% Pacific Islander, 0.98% from other races, and 0.50% from two or more races. 1.90% of the population were Hispanic or Latino of any race.

According to the census of 2000, the largest ancestry groups in Leflore County were African 67.73%, English 19%, and Scots-Irish 9.4%

There were 12,956 households, out of which 35.40% had children under the age of 18 living with them, 36.00% were married couples living together, 27.60% had a female householder with no husband present, and 31.40% were non-families. 28.20% of all households were made up of individuals, and 11.60% had someone living alone who was 65 years of age or older. The average household size was 2.70 and the average family size was 3.33.

In the county, the population was spread out, with 29.70% under the age of 18, 13.10% from 18 to 24, 27.00% from 25 to 44, 18.20% from 45 to 64, and 11.90% who were 65 years of age or older. The median age was 30 years. For every 100 females, there were 92.50 males. For every 100 females age 18 and over, there were 87.50 males.

The median income for a household in the county was $21,518, and the median income for a family was $26,059. Males had a median income of $25,959 versus $18,497 for females. The per capita income for the county was $12,553. About 29.10% of families and 34.80% of the population were below the poverty line, including 48.00% of those under age 18 and 24.50% of those age 65 or over.

== Government and infrastructure ==
The Delta Correctional Facility, operated by the Corrections Corporation of America on behalf of the Mississippi Department of Corrections, is located in Greenwood in Leflore County.

Leflore County is heavily Democratic, like other counties located in the Mississippi Delta. It has not supported a Republican presidential candidate since 1988.

United States presidential election results for Leflore County, Mississippi
Year	Republican		Democratic		Third party(ies)	
Year	No.	%	No.	%	No.	%
1912	12	1.79%	616	91.80%	43	6.41%
1916	28	3.18%	853	96.82%	0	0.00%
1920	39	3.85%	969	95.75%	4	0.40%
1924	135	10.56%	1,144	89.44%	0	0.00%
1928	105	4.52%	2,219	95.48%	0	0.00%
1932	34	1.78%	1,877	98.02%	4	0.21%
1936	35	1.61%	2,137	98.34%	1	0.05%
1940	111	4.41%	2,404	95.59%	0	0.00%
1944	200	7.70%	2,399	92.30%	0	0.00%
1948	80	2.69%	139	4.68%	2,754	92.63%
1952	2,434	56.88%	1,845	43.12%	0	0.00%
1956	887	24.72%	1,769	49.30%	932	25.98%
1960	1,317	28.38%	1,212	26.12%	2,112	45.51%
1964	5,589	93.63%	380	6.37%	0	0.00%
1968	1,514	13.02%	4,386	37.71%	5,732	49.28%
1972	6,779	75.58%	2,038	22.72%	152	1.69%
1976	5,872	46.64%	6,135	48.73%	582	4.62%
1980	5,798	42.40%	7,498	54.83%	379	2.77%
1984	7,550	49.63%	7,443	48.93%	219	1.44%
1988	6,409	50.95%	5,830	46.35%	340	2.70%
1992	5,298	42.39%	6,374	51.00%	826	6.61%
1996	4,456	38.04%	6,853	58.51%	404	3.45%
2000	4,626	41.03%	6,401	56.77%	249	2.21%
2004	4,635	37.19%	7,566	60.71%	262	2.10%
2008	4,105	31.38%	8,914	68.14%	62	0.47%
2012	3,587	28.08%	9,119	71.39%	67	0.52%
2016	3,212	28.83%	7,787	69.90%	141	1.27%
2020	3,129	28.72%	7,648	70.21%	116	1.06%
2024	2,854	30.29%	6,476	68.74%	91	0.97%

== Education ==
=== Colleges and Universities ===
Mississippi Valley State University is located 1 mile (1.6 km) northwest of Itta Bena in an unincorporated area.

Additionally the county is in the district for Mississippi Delta Community College. The main campus is in Moorhead in Sunflower County.

=== Primary and secondary schools ===
- Public School District: Greenwood-Leflore Consolidated School District, formed on July 1, 2019, from the consolidation of the Greenwood Public School District and the Leflore County School District The district is the only school district in Leflore County.
  - Greenwood High School (formerly of the Greenwood District)
  - Amanda Elzy High School (formerly of the Leflore Co. District)
  - Leflore County High School (formerly of the Leflore Co. District)
- Private Schools
  - Delta Streets Academy
  - Pillow Academy — formerly a segregation academy.

== Communities ==
=== Cities ===
- Greenwood (county seat)
- Itta Bena

=== Towns ===
- Morgan City
- Schlater
- Sidon

=== Census-designated place ===
- Mississippi Valley State University CDP

=== Unincorporated communities ===
- Berclair
- Browning
- McNutt
- Minter City (partly in Tallahatchie County)
- Money
- Quito
- Rising Sun
- Ruby
- Shellmound
- Sunnyside
- Swiftown
- Wildwood

=== Ghost town ===
- Colony Town

== See also ==
- National Register of Historic Places listings in Leflore County, Mississippi
