= Bentonia School =

Music genre and performance technique

The Bentonia school, a style of guitar-playing sometimes attributed to blues players from Bentonia, Mississippi, features a shared repertoire of songs, guitar tunings and chord-voicings with a distinctively minor tonality not found in other styles of blues music.

While not all blues musicians from Bentonia played in this style, one particular blues player, Skip James (1902–1969), had a distinct, complicated, and highly sophisticated style that veered from typical blues guitar playing. His style became known as Bentonia School.

James became the most well-known of the small pool of musicians associated with the Bentonia School. Others include Jack Owens, Jimmy "Duck" Holmes, and the un-recorded Henry Stuckey. Both James' and Owens' styles featured haunting minor chords and droning strings which, in comparison to the music of many other blues musicians, ring with an ominous and eerie feel.

The Bentonia school of guitar playing has strong associations with a guitar-tuning based on an open E minor chord. From the lowest (6th) string to the highest (1st), the tuning uses E-B-E-G-B-E. (A common variant pitches the same intervals a whole step lower, in D minor: D-A-D-F-A-D.) Although other blues musicians in a range of styles used this tuning (Booker "Bukka" White, Albert Collins, Arthur "Big Boy" Crudup, Henry Townsend and others), the Bentonia musicians used it to great effect, achieving a distinctive tonality unique to the region.

== Films ==
- Deep Blues (1991). Directed by Robert Mugge.
