= Robert Johnson recordings =

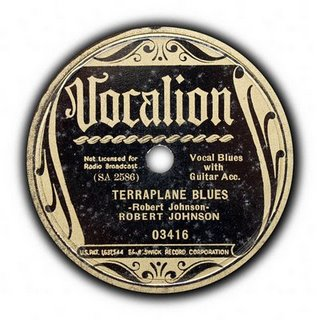
Label of Johnson's "Terraplane Blues" on Vocalion Records, his first and most successful single

American blues musician Robert Johnson (1911–1938) recorded 29 songs during his brief career. A total of 59 performances, including alternate takes, were recorded over a period of five days at two makeshift recording studios in Texas. Producers selected 25, which Vocalion Records issued on 12 two-sided 78 rpm record singles between 1937 and 1939. These went out-of-print, but were the only source of Johnson's work until his recordings were eventually issued on albums beginning in 1959. In addition to those on the original singles, another 17 recordings have been released (five additional songs and 12 alternate takes).

In 1990, Columbia Records issued the first comprehensive collection of Johnson's work, The Complete Recordings. Although some of Johnson's 78s sold relatively well for their time, Columbia's box set became a best seller. It reached number 80 on the main American pop album chart and sold over one million copies in the U.S. by 1994. In 2011, for the centennial of Johnson's birth, Columbia remastered and reissued the set with an additional recording. Stephen LaVere, who manages Johnson's recording legacy and produced the collections, believes that uncovering additional performances is unlikely: "If any additional material was recorded, it is expected that nothing survived; that if anything did, it would have surfaced long before now [2011] ... but one never knows. Stranger things have happened."

== Sessionography ==
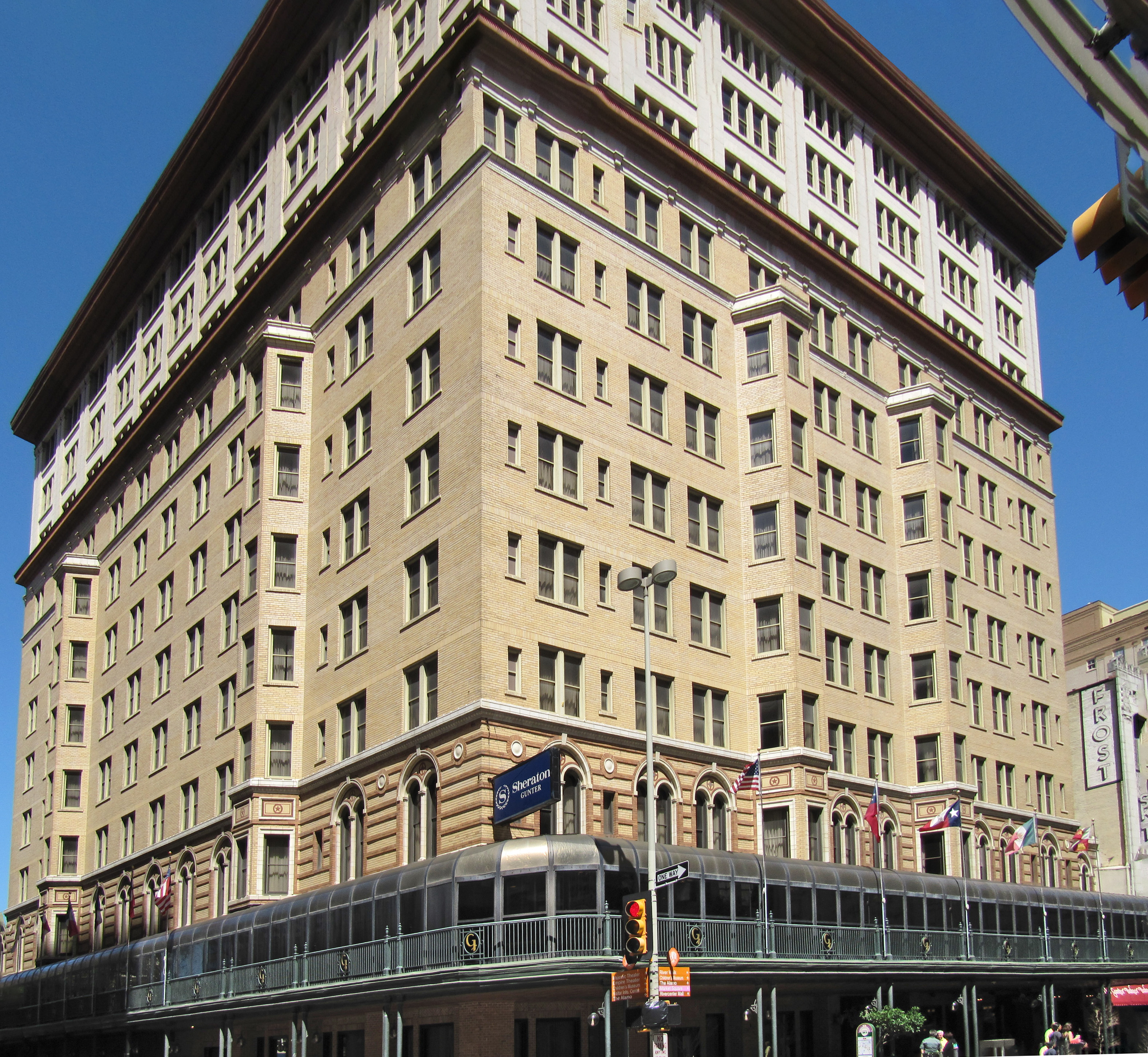
Gunter Hotel, San Antonio, Texas, in 2010

Johnson's first recording session took place on Monday, November 23, 1936, in San Antonio, Texas. A makeshift studio had been set up in the Gunter Hotel, where the recording equipment was located in one room and a second, Room 414, was where the musicians performed. Johnson was the only one to record that day and performed solo, singing and accompanying himself on acoustic guitar. Two more sessions followed, on Thursday and Friday, November 27 and 28. After the successful release of "Terraplane Blues" in March 1937, additional recording sessions took place in Dallas, Texas. On Saturday and Sunday, June 19 and 20, 1937, Johnson, again performing solo, was recorded in an unused storage area on the third floor of the former Vitagraph and Warner Bros. building.

The sessions were overseen by Art Satherley, who was a producer for the American Record Corporation (ARC) and Vocalion Records in New York City. He arranged for Don Law to produce the actual recording sessions, with recording engineer Vincent Liebler. While it was standard practice for an individual in Law's position to guide musicians during recording, it is not known what, if any, input he had in shaping Johnson's material. However, Law had Johnson record additional performances (or alternate takes) for each of his songs. Law's recollection that Johnson performed facing the wall led some early writers to conclude that he was "extremely shy" or "suffering from a bad case of stage fright". Guitarist Ry Cooder added to the speculation that Johnson was using a technique referred to as "corner loading" to enhance his guitar sound for the recordings. However, both ideas are refuted by Bruce Conforth and Gayle Dean Wardlow, authors of a 2019 biography of Johnson. They note that Johnson only turned his back on one occasion when asked to play for other musicians who were in the studio, following his practice of shielding his techniques from scrutiny by other guitarists. Session logs show that a total of 59 of Johnson's performances were recorded (two takes of each song plus one third take), but only 42 have been found and the rest are believed to be "lost to the ages".

Key
^{†}	Indicates original 78 rpm record release
^{‡}	Indicates first released on album
^{#}	Indicates unissued recording (presumed lost)

List of recordings
Take No. (matrix)	Title	Recording date	Location	Ref(s)
SA 2580-1^{†}	"Kind Hearted Woman Blues"	November 23, 1936	Gunter Hotel, Room 414; San Antonio, Texas	
SA 2580-2^{†}	"Kind Hearted Woman Blues"	November 23, 1936	Gunter Hotel, Room 414; San Antonio, Texas	
SA 2581-1^{†}	"I Believe I'll Dust My Broom"	November 23, 1936	Gunter Hotel, Room 414; San Antonio, Texas	
SA 2581-2^{#}	"I Believe I'll Dust My Broom"	November 23, 1936	Gunter Hotel, Room 414; San Antonio, Texas	
SA 2582-1^{†}	"Sweet Home Chicago"	November 23, 1936	Gunter Hotel, Room 414; San Antonio, Texas	
SA 2582-2^{#}	"Sweet Home Chicago"	November 23, 1936	Gunter Hotel, Room 414; San Antonio, Texas	
SA 2583-1^{‡}	"Ramblin' on My Mind"	November 23, 1936	Gunter Hotel, Room 414; San Antonio, Texas	
SA 2583-2^{†}	"Ramblin' on My Mind"	November 23, 1936	Gunter Hotel, Room 414; San Antonio, Texas	
SA 2584-1^{‡}	"When You Got a Good Friend"	November 23, 1936	Gunter Hotel, Room 414; San Antonio, Texas	
SA 2584-2^{‡}	"When You Got a Good Friend"	November 23, 1936	Gunter Hotel, Room 414; San Antonio, Texas	
SA 2585-1^{‡}	"Come On in My Kitchen"	November 23, 1936	Gunter Hotel, Room 414; San Antonio, Texas	
SA 2585-2^{†}	"Come On in My Kitchen"	November 23, 1936	Gunter Hotel, Room 414; San Antonio, Texas	
SA 2586-1^{†}	"Terraplane Blues"	November 23, 1936	Gunter Hotel, Room 414; San Antonio, Texas	
SA 2586-2^{#}	"Terraplane Blues"	November 23, 1936	Gunter Hotel, Room 414; San Antonio, Texas	
SA 2587-1^{‡}	"Phonograph Blues"	November 23, 1936	Gunter Hotel, Room 414; San Antonio, Texas	
SA 2587-2^{‡}	"Phonograph Blues"	November 23, 1936	Gunter Hotel, Room 414; San Antonio, Texas	
SA 2616-1^{#}	"32-20 Blues"	November 26, 1936	Gunter Hotel, Room 414; San Antonio, Texas	
SA 2616-2^{†}	"32-20 Blues"	November 26, 1936	Gunter Hotel, Room 414; San Antonio, Texas	
SA 2627-1^{†}	"They're Red Hot"	November 27, 1936	Gunter Hotel, Room 414; San Antonio, Texas	
SA 2627-2^{#}	"They're Red Hot"	November 27, 1936	Gunter Hotel, Room 414; San Antonio, Texas	
SA 2628-1^{#}	"Dead Shrimp Blues"	November 27, 1936	Gunter Hotel, Room 414; San Antonio, Texas	
SA 2628-2^{†}	"Dead Shrimp Blues"	November 27, 1936	Gunter Hotel, Room 414; San Antonio, Texas	
SA 2629-1^{†}	"Cross Road Blues"	November 27, 1936	Gunter Hotel, Room 414; San Antonio, Texas	
SA 2629-2^{‡}	"Cross Road Blues"	November 27, 1936	Gunter Hotel, Room 414; San Antonio, Texas	
SA 2630-1^{†}	"Walkin' Blues"	November 27, 1936	Gunter Hotel, Room 414; San Antonio, Texas	
SA 2630-2^{#}	"Walkin' Blues"	November 27, 1936	Gunter Hotel, Room 414; San Antonio, Texas	
SA 2631-1^{†}	"Last Fair Deal Gone Down"	November 27, 1936	Gunter Hotel, Room 414; San Antonio, Texas	
SA 2631-2^{#}	"Last Fair Deal Gone Down"	November 27, 1936	Gunter Hotel, Room 414; San Antonio, Texas	
SA 2632-1^{†}	"Preachin' Blues (Up Jumped the Devil)"	November 27, 1936	Gunter Hotel, Room 414; San Antonio, Texas	
SA 2632-2^{#}	"Preachin' Blues (Up Jumped the Devil)"	November 27, 1936	Gunter Hotel, Room 414; San Antonio, Texas	
SA 2633-1^{‡}	"If I Had Possession Over Judgment Day"	November 27, 1936	Gunter Hotel, Room 414; San Antonio, Texas	
SA 2633-2^{#}	"If I Had Possession Over Judgment Day"	November 27, 1936	Gunter Hotel, Room 414; San Antonio, Texas	
DAL 377-1^{#}	"Stones in My Passway"	June 19, 1937	Former Vitagraph/ Warner Bros. 508 Park Avenue, Third floor, Dallas, Texas	
DAL 377-2^{†}	"Stones in My Passway"	June 19, 1937	Former Vitagraph/ Warner Bros. 508 Park Avenue, Third floor, Dallas, Texas	
DAL 378-1^{†}	"I'm a Steady Rollin' Man"	June 19, 1937	Former Vitagraph/ Warner Bros. 508 Park Avenue, Third floor, Dallas, Texas	
DAL 378-2^{#}	"I'm a Steady Rollin' Man"	June 19, 1937	Former Vitagraph/ Warner Bros. 508 Park Avenue, Third floor, Dallas, Texas	
DAL 379-1^{†}	"From Four Until Late"	June 19, 1937	Former Vitagraph/ Warner Bros. 508 Park Avenue, Third floor, Dallas, Texas	
DAL 379-2^{#}	"From Four Until Late"	June 19, 1937	Former Vitagraph/ Warner Bros. 508 Park Avenue, Third floor, Dallas, Texas	
DAL 394-1^{#}	"Hell Hound on My Trail"	June 20, 1937	Former Vitagraph/ Warner Bros. 508 Park Avenue, Third floor, Dallas, Texas	
DAL 394-2^{†}	"Hell Hound on My Trail"	June 20, 1937	Former Vitagraph/ Warner Bros. 508 Park Avenue, Third floor, Dallas, Texas	
DAL 395-1^{†}	"Little Queen of Spades"	June 20, 1937	Former Vitagraph/ Warner Bros. 508 Park Avenue, Third floor, Dallas, Texas	
DAL 395-2^{‡}	"Little Queen of Spades"	June 20, 1937	Former Vitagraph/ Warner Bros. 508 Park Avenue, Third floor, Dallas, Texas	
DAL 396-1^{†}	"Malted Milk"	June 20, 1937	Former Vitagraph/ Warner Bros. 508 Park Avenue, Third floor, Dallas, Texas	
DAL 396-2^{#}	"Malted Milk"	June 20, 1937	Former Vitagraph/ Warner Bros. 508 Park Avenue, Third floor, Dallas, Texas	
DAL 397-1^{‡}	"Drunken Hearted Man"	June 20, 1937	Former Vitagraph/ Warner Bros. 508 Park Avenue, Third floor, Dallas, Texas	
DAL 397-2^{‡}	"Drunken Hearted Man"	June 20, 1937	Former Vitagraph/ Warner Bros. 508 Park Avenue, Third floor, Dallas, Texas	
DAL 398-1^{†}	"Me and the Devil Blues"	June 20, 1937	Former Vitagraph/ Warner Bros. 508 Park Avenue, Third floor, Dallas, Texas	
DAL 398-2^{‡}	"Me and the Devil Blues"	June 20, 1937	Former Vitagraph/ Warner Bros. 508 Park Avenue, Third floor, Dallas, Texas	
DAL 399-1^{‡}	"Stop Breakin' Down Blues"	June 20, 1937	Former Vitagraph/ Warner Bros. 508 Park Avenue, Third floor, Dallas, Texas	
DAL 399-2^{†}	"Stop Breakin' Down Blues"	June 20, 1937	Former Vitagraph/ Warner Bros. 508 Park Avenue, Third floor, Dallas, Texas	
DAL 400-1^{‡}	"Traveling Riverside Blues"	June 20, 1937	Former Vitagraph/ Warner Bros. 508 Park Avenue, Third floor, Dallas, Texas	
DAL 400-2^{‡}	"Traveling Riverside Blues"	June 20, 1937	Former Vitagraph/ Warner Bros. 508 Park Avenue, Third floor, Dallas, Texas	
DAL 401-1^{†}	"Honeymoon Blues"	June 20, 1937	Former Vitagraph/ Warner Bros. 508 Park Avenue, Third floor, Dallas, Texas	
DAL 401-2^{#}	"Honeymoon Blues"	June 20, 1937	Former Vitagraph/ Warner Bros. 508 Park Avenue, Third floor, Dallas, Texas	
DAL 402-1^{‡}	"Love in Vain Blues"	June 20, 1937	Former Vitagraph/ Warner Bros. 508 Park Avenue, Third floor, Dallas, Texas	
DAL 402-2^{†}	"Love in Vain Blues"	June 20, 1937	Former Vitagraph/ Warner Bros. 508 Park Avenue, Third floor, Dallas, Texas	
DAL 403-1^{#}	"Milkcow's Calf Blues"	June 20, 1937	Former Vitagraph/ Warner Bros. 508 Park Avenue, Third floor, Dallas, Texas	
DAL 403-2^{†}	"Milkcow's Calf Blues"	June 20, 1937	Former Vitagraph/ Warner Bros. 508 Park Avenue, Third floor, Dallas, Texas	
DAL 403-3^{‡}	"Milkcow's Calf Blues"	June 20, 1937	Former Vitagraph/ Warner Bros. 508 Park Avenue, Third floor, Dallas, Texas	

== Discography ==
=== Singles ===
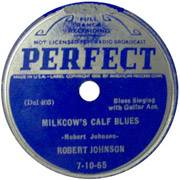
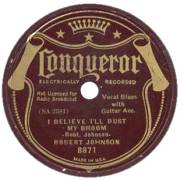
Several ARC budget labels also pressed Johnson's singles, including Perfect and Conqueror.

Johnson's records were initially issued on 78 rpm record singles by Vocalion, one of several labels that specialized in jazz and blues. These were supplemented with pressings from ARC's budget labels, Perfect Records, Oriole Records, Romeo Records, and Conqueror Records, which were sold through variety retailers or "dime stores". Although it was thought that several alternate takes might have been issued by these labels, for the 2011 Centennial Collection, LaVere notes that only one, "Kind Hearted Woman Blues" (the flip-side of "Terraplane Blues") was actually issued with both takes. When Columbia Records bought ARC in early 1938, the budget labels were discontinued and Johnson's records were issued on the Vocalion label into 1939. These early 78s were the source of Johnson's music until his songs were later released on long playing (LP) record albums.

There has been some speculation that Johnson's recordings had been sped up for the singles. However, this idea has been disputed by biographer Elijah Wald, who concluded:

Some of Johnson’s tracks may have been issued at slightly inaccurate speeds (for example, recorded at 76 r.p.m. and played back at 78), but it is wildly improbable (bordering on impossible) that all of them have been issued at a single, consistent, wrong speed.

List of singles with year, title, details, and references
Year	Title (take) A-side / B-side	Details	Ref(s)
1937	"Kind Hearted Woman Blues" (Nos. 1 & 2) /; "Terraplane Blues" (No. 1)	Label: Vocalion (03416); Released: March 1937; Secondary labels: Perfect, Oriole (Note: January 4, 1937, is identified as the pressing date for Perfect and Oriole.)	
1937	"Dead Shrimp Blues" (No. 2) /; "I Believe I'll Dust My Broom" (No. 1)	Label: Vocalion (03475); Released: April 1937; Secondary labels: Perfect, Romeo, Conqueror	
1937	"Cross Road Blues" (No. 1) /; "Ramblin' on My Mind" (No. 2)	Label: Vocalion (03519); Released: May 1937; Secondary labels: Perfect, Romeo	
1937	"Come On in My Kitchen" (No. 2) /; "They're Red Hot" (No. 1)	Label: Vocalion (03563); Released: 1937 (Note: June 1, 1937, appears to be the pressing date for Perfect and Romeo.); Secondary labels: Perfect, Romeo	
1937	"32-20 Blues" (No. 2) /; "Last Fair Deal Gone Down" (No. 1)	Label: Vocalion (03445); Released: 1937 (Note: February 10, 1937, is identified as the pressing date for Perfect.); Secondary labels: Perfect, Oriole	
1937	"Sweet Home Chicago" (No. 1) /; "Walkin' Blues" (No. 1)	Label: Vocalion (03601); Released: 1937	
1937	"From Four Until Late" (No. 1) /; "Hell Hound on My Trail" (No. 2)	Label: Vocalion (03623); Released: 1937 (Note: August 1, 1937, appears to be the pressing date for Perfect and Romeo.); Secondary labels: Perfect, Romeo	
1937	"Malted Milk" (No. 1) /; "Milkcow's Calf Blues" (No. 2)	Label: Vocalion (03665); Released: 1937 (Note: September 15, 1937, is identified as the release date for Perfect and Romeo.); Secondary labels: Perfect, Romeo, Conqueror	
1937	"I'm a Steady Rollin' Man" (No. 1) /; "Stones in My Passway" (No. 2)	Label: Vocalion (03723); Released: 1937 (Note: November 15, 1937, is identified as the release date for Perfect.); Secondary labels: Perfect, Conqueror	
1938	"Honeymoon Blues" (No. 1) /; "Stop Breakin' Down Blues" (No. 2)	Label: Vocalion (04002); Released: March 20, 1938	
1938	"Little Queen of Spades" (No. 1) /; "Me and the Devil Blues" (No. 1)	Label: Vocalion (04108); Released: 1938	
1939	"Love in Vain Blues" (No. 2) /; "Preachin' Blues (Up Jumped the Devil)" (No. 1)	Label: Vocalion (04630); Released: February 9, 1939	

=== Albums ===
In 1959, "Preachin' Blues" (Johnson's last Vocalion single), was the first of his recordings to appear on an album. Folkways Records included it on a compilation of songs by early blues musicians, titled The Country Blues. In 1961, Columbia released King of the Delta Blues Singers, the first album to feature Johnson exclusively. It includes a mix of recordings originally issued on 78s and previously unreleased material. A follow-up album, King of the Delta Blues Singers, Vol. II was issued in 1970, again with some original and unreleased recordings.

In 1990, Columbia issued a comprehensive box set, titled The Complete Recordings. With 41 recordings, it contained all of Johnson recordings known at the time. However, a second take of "Traveling Riverside Blues" was discovered and released with the reissue of King of the Delta Blues Singers in 1998. When The Complete Recordings was updated in 2011 for the centennial of Johnson's birth, the extra track was included, bringing the total to 42. LaVere believes that this represents all of Johnson's remaining recordings, but leaves open the possibility that more may exist.

In countries with different copyright rules, record companies other than Columbia have issued their own collections of Johnson's recordings. William Ruhlmann explained in an AllMusic review:

Due to the age of the recordings, however, they are in the public domain in Europe, so any record label can simply copy an existing disc and put out its own version. Hence, there have been many cheap competing collections of Johnson's recordings put out on European CDs.

These are not supposed to be sold in the U.S., where Johnson's recordings are still copyright protected. (Note: Sound recordings published in the U.S. from 1923 to 1946 enter the public domain 100 years after publication. Applying this to Johnson's recordings, those first released on singles will become available in 2037 to 2039.) However, inexpensive imports are often available, but may lack quality sound and liner notes.

List of albums with year, title, details, and references
Year	Title	Details	Ref(s)
1959	The Country Blues	Label: Folkways (RF1); Released: 1959; Format: Long-playing 12-inch record album (LP); Notes: Various artists compilation with Johnson's "Preachin' Blues"	
1961	King of the Delta Blues Singers	Label: Columbia (CL 1654); Released: 1961; Format: LP; Notes: Reissued in 1998 with "Traveling Riverside Blues" (No. 1) as a bonus track	
1970	King of the Delta Blues Singers, Vol. II	Label: Columbia (30034); Released: 1970; Format: LP	
1990	The Complete Recordings	Label: Columbia (CK 46222); Released: 1990; Format: Box set with 2-compact audio discs (CDs), 3-LPs, or 2-audio cassettes; Notes: Reissued in 2011 as The Centennial Collection with "Traveling Riverside Blues" (No. 1)	

== Commercial performance ==
Billboard magazine did not begin publishing its first record chart that tracked blues releases until 1942, after Johnson's records were out-of-print. Recordings by blues artists were not broadcast on radio; however, they were common in jukeboxes in the South, so their popularity is not solely reflected in the numbers pressed or sold (Billboard's first "Race Records" jukebox chart did not appear until 1945).

Pressing and sales statistics for Vocalion are not available, but Johnson's first record, "Terraplane Blues" backed with "Kind Hearted Woman Blues", is regarded as his most successful. It may have sold 10,000 copies, which was considered a hit at the time. According to Conforth and Wardlow, his second, "I Believe I'll Dust My Broom" / "Dead Shrimp Blues", also "sold well", with an initial pressing of 5,000; and the next release, "Cross Road Blues" / "Ramblin' on My Mind", was "widely heard in the Delta", although neither song was considered a hit. Estimates for the remainder of Johnson's 78 catalogue only show numbers for the secondary labels; Perfect, Oriole, and Romeo pressed an additional 5,550 copies of Johnson's first eight (out of his total of 12) records. By December 1938, Vocalion only included six of Johnson's records in its catalogue, but issued a last, "Love in Vain Blues" / "Preachin' Blues" in February 1939.

Johnson's first albums, King of the Delta Blues Singers (1961) and King of the Delta Blues Singers, Vol. II (1970), were popular with critics and musicians, but failed to sell sufficiently to reach the Billboard charts. However, after Columbia released The Complete Recordings (1990) box set, it reached number 80 on the magazine's Top Pop Albums chart in 1991 and, in 1994, was certified platinum (one million copies sold) by the Recording Industry Association of America (RIAA).

== Bibliography ==
- Conforth, Bruce; Wardlow, Gayle Dean (2019). Up Jumped the Devil: The Real Life of Robert Johnson. Chicago Review Press. ISBN 978-1-64160-094-1.
- Cutting, Jenifer, ed. (1991). American Folk Music and Folklore Recordings 1990: A Selected List. Washington D.C.: U.S. Library of Congress. ISSN 0748-5905.
- Gioia, Ted (2008). Delta Blues (Norton Paperback 2009 ed.). New York City: W. W. Norton. ISBN 978-0-393-33750-1.
- Grossman, Stefan (2007). Lonnie Johnson. Van Nuys, California: Alfred Publishing. ISBN 978-0-7390-4332-5.
- LaVere, Stephen (1990). The Complete Recordings (Box set booklet). Robert Johnson. New York City: Columbia Records. OCLC 24547399. C2K 46222.
- LaVere, Stephen (2011). The Centennial Collection (Box set booklet). Robert Johnson. New York City: Columbia Records. OCLC 977691110. 88697859072-11.
- Palmer, Robert (1981). Deep Blues. New York City: Penguin Books. ISBN 0-14-006223-8.
- Pearson, Barry Lee; McCulloch, Bill (2008). Robert Johnson: Lost and Found. Champaign, Illinois: University of Illinois Press. ISBN 978-0-252-07528-5.
- Whitburn, Joel (1988). "Researching the Billboard R&B Charts". Top R&B Singles 1942–1988. Menomonee Falls, Wisconsin: Record Research. ISBN 0-89820-068-7.
