= The Complete Recordings (Robert Johnson album) =

Compilation album by Robert Johnson
- Released: August 28, 1990
- Recorded: November 23–27, 1936; June 19–20, 1937
- Studios: Gunter Hotel, San Antonio, Texas, US; Warner Brothers/Vitagraph Building, Dallas, Texas, US
- Genre: Delta blues
- Length: 104:53
- Label: Columbia
- Producers: Don Law (original recordings); Stephen LaVere, Frank Driggs (reissue)

Robert Johnson chronology
King of the Delta Blues Singers, Vol. II (1970)	The Complete Recordings (1990)

The Complete Recordings is a compilation album by American Delta blues musician Robert Johnson. The 59 takes of 29 songs were recorded over five days in two sessions in San Antonio and Dallas, Texas, for the American Record Company (ARC) during 1936 and 1937. Vocalion released 24 songs on double sided 78 rpm records between 1937-1939. Of the 59, 17 are presumed to be lost. Five songs were never released by Vocalion. The Complete Recordings, released August 28, 1990, by Columbia Records, contains every recording Johnson is known to have made, except an alternate take of "Traveling Riverside Blues".

The Complete Recordings peaked at number 80 on the Billboard 200 chart. The album sold more than a million copies and won a Grammy Award in 1991 for "Best Historical Album." In 1992, the Blues Foundation inducted the album into the Blues Hall of Fame. The National Recording Preservation Board also included it in the Library of Congress's National Recording Registry in 2003. Eric Clapton and Keith Richards contributed to the album's liner notes with essays on Johnson's influence on their music.

== Background and recording ==
Before he died in 1938, with the help of H. C. Speir, Johnson recorded 29 songs for the American Record Corporation (ARC). His complete canon of recordings includes these 29 masters, plus 13 surviving alternate takes, all recorded at two ARC sessions held in San Antonio and Dallas, Texas. The Mississippi Delta—200 miles of fertile lowlands stretching from Memphis, Tennessee, in the North to Vicksburg, Mississippi, in the South—was one of the primary locales in which the blues originated and developed. He is said to have been heavily influenced by early blues artists like Skip James, who was recorded in 1931, around the same time that Johnson amazed his elders with his mastery of the guitar. James's eerie, distinctive style is reflected throughout Johnson's recordings, especially "32-20 Blues," which he adapted from James's "22-20 Blues."

Johnson's first session in San Antonio took place over three days – November 23, 26, and 27, 1936. Sixteen songs were recorded in the Gunter Hotel, where ARC had set up equipment to record several musical artists. "Kind Hearted Woman Blues" was the first song recorded. Collectors noticed that different pressings of Vocalion 3416 featured Take 1 and others take 2 of Kind Hearted Woman Blues, the second take features a standalone guitar solo. Also captured in San Antonio were "I Believe I'll Dust My Broom" and "Sweet Home Chicago," both of which became post-war blues standards. "Terraplane Blues," known for its metaphoric lyrics, became a regional hit and Johnson's signature song. Most of the selections were released on Vocalion 78 rpm records, but three songs and several interesting alternate takes remained unissued until they appeared on the Columbia albums. Six months later, on June 19 and 20, 1937, other recording sessions took place at the Warner Brothers/Vitagraph Building in Dallas, where, once again, ARC had set up its recording equipment to capture many different musicians. This time, 13 songs were recorded and 10 were released during the following year.

== Reception and influence ==
Professional ratings
Review scores
Source	Rating
AllMusic	5/5 stars
Baltimore Sun	(favorable)
Chicago Tribune	4/4 stars
Down Beat	5/5 stars
Entertainment Weekly	(A+)
Los Angeles Times	(favorable)
Q	5/5 stars
Rolling Stone	5/5 stars
Time	(favorable)
Washington Post	(favorable)
The Penguin Guide to Blues Recordings	4/4 stars

While Robert Johnson's professional recording career can be measured in months, his musical legacy has survived more than 70 years. Muddy Waters and Howlin' Wolf, the two most prominent Chicago bluesmen of the 1950s, both had their roots in the Delta: Muddy was influenced by Johnson's records, and Wolf worked with Johnson in the Delta area. Johnson's emotive vocals, combined with his varied and masterful guitar playing, continue to influence modern blues and popular music performers.

The Chicago Tribune's Greg Kot wrote that The Complete Recordings, along with Clapton's The Layla Sessions (1990), survive as "monuments of 20th Century music that will rarely, if ever, be equaled."

In 2012, the album was ranked number 22 on Rolling Stone magazine's list of the 500 greatest albums of all time.

== Track listing ==
For recording dates and original releases, see Robert Johnson recordings.

=== Original release (1990) ===
Disc one
No.	Title	Issued on	Length
1.	"Kindhearted Woman Blues" (take 1)	Vocalion 03416	2:49
2.	"Kindhearted Woman Blues" (take 2)	Vocalion 03416	2:31
3.	"I Believe I'll Dust My Broom"	Vocalion 03475	2:56
4.	"Sweet Home Chicago"	Vocalion 03601	2:59
5.	"Rambling on My Mind" (take 1)	Columbia CL 1654	2:51
6.	"Rambling on My Mind" (take 2)	Vocalion 03519	2:20
7.	"When You Got a Good Friend" (take 1)	Columbia CL 1654	2:37
8.	"When You Got a Good Friend" (take 2)	previously unreleased	2:50
9.	"Come On in My Kitchen" (take 1)	Columbia CL 1654	2:47
10.	"Come On in My Kitchen" (take 2)	Vocalion 03563	2:35
11.	"Terraplane Blues"	Vocalion 03416	3:00
12.	"Phonograph Blues" (take 1)	Columbia 30034	2:37
13.	"Phonograph Blues" (take 2)	previously unreleased	2:32
14.	"32-20 Blues"	Vocalion 03445	2:51
15.	"They're Red Hot"	Vocalion 03563	2:56
16.	"Dead Shrimp Blues"	Vocalion 03475	2:30
17.	"Cross Road Blues" (take 1)	Vocalion 03519	2:39
18.	"Cross Road Blues" (take 2)	Columbia CL 1654	2:29
19.	"Walking Blues"	Vocalion 03601	2:28
20.	"Last Fair Deal Gone Down"	Vocalion 03445	2:39

Disc two
No.	Title	Issued on	Length
1.	"Preaching Blues (Up Jumped the Devil)"	Vocalion 04630	2:50
2.	"If I Had Possession Over Judgment Day"	Columbia CL 1654	2:34
3.	"Stones in My Passway"	Vocalion 03723	2:27
4.	"I'm a Steady Rollin' Man"	Vocalion 03723	2:35
5.	"From Four Till Late"	Vocalion 03623	2:23
6.	"Hellhound on My Trail"	Vocalion 03623	2:35
7.	"Little Queen of Spades" (take 1)	Vocalion 04108	2:11
8.	"Little Queen of Spades" (take 2)	Columbia 30034	2:15
9.	"Malted Milk"	Vocalion 03665	2:17
10.	"Drunken Hearted Man" (take 1)	Columbia 30034	2:24
11.	"Drunken Hearted Man" (take 2)	previously unreleased	2:19
12.	"Me and the Devil Blues" (take 1)	Vocalion 04108	2:37
13.	"Me and the Devil Blues" (take 2)	Columbia CL 1654	2:29
14.	"Stop Breakin' Down Blues" (take 1)	Columbia 30034	2:16
15.	"Stop Breakin' Down Blues" (take 2)	Vocalion 04002	2:21
16.	"Traveling Riverside Blues"	Columbia CL 1654	2:47
17.	"Honeymoon Blues"	Vocalion 04002	2:16
18.	"Love in Vain" (take 1)	Columbia 30034	2:28
19.	"Love in Vain" (take 4)	Vocalion 04630	2:19
20.	"Milkcow's Calf Blues" (take 3)	Columbia CL 1654	2:14
21.	"Milkcow's Calf Blues" (take 2)	Vocalion 03665	2:20

=== The Centennial Collection (2011) ===
Disc one (San Antonio Recordings)
No.	Title	Issued on	Length
1.	"Kind Hearted Woman Blues" (take 1)	Vocalion 03416	2:49
2.	"I Believe I'll Dust My Broom"	Vocalion 03475	2:56
3.	"Sweet Home Chicago"	Vocalion 03601	2:59
4.	"Ramblin' on My Mind" (take 2)	Vocalion 03519	2:20
5.	"When You Got a Good Friend" (take 1)	Columbia CL 1654	2:37
6.	"Come On in My Kitchen" (take 2)	Vocalion 03563	2:35
7.	"Terraplane Blues"	Vocalion 03416	3:00
8.	"Phonograph Blues" (take 1)	Columbia 30034	2:37
9.	"32-20 Blues"	Vocalion 03445	2:51
10.	"They're Red Hot"	Vocalion 03563	2:56
11.	"Dead Shrimp Blues"	Vocalion 03475	2:30
12.	"Cross Road Blues" (take 1)	Vocalion 03519	2:39
13.	"Walkin' Blues"	Vocalion 03601	2:28
14.	"Last Fair Deal Gone Down"	Vocalion 03445	2:39
15.	"Preachin' Blues (Up Jumped the Devil)"	Vocalion 04630	2:50
16.	"If I Had Possession Over Judgment Day"	Columbia CL 1654	2:34
17.	"Kind Hearted Woman Blues" (take 2)	Vocalion 03416	2:31
18.	"Ramblin' on My Mind" (take 1)	Columbia CL 1654	2:51
19.	"When You Got a Good Friend" (take 2)	C3/C2T/CK 46222	2:50
20.	"Come On in My Kitchen" (take 1)	Columbia CL 1654	2:47
21.	"Phonograph Blues" (take 2)	C3/C2T/CK 46222	2:32
22.	"Cross Road Blues" (take 2)	Columbia CL 1654	2:29

Disc two (Dallas Recordings)
No.	Title	Issued on	Length
1.	"Stones in My Passway"	Vocalion 03723	2:27
2.	"I'm a Steady Rollin' Man"	Vocalion 03723	2:35
3.	"From Four Until Late"	Vocalion 03623	2:23
4.	"Hellhound on My Trail"	Vocalion 03623	2:35
5.	"Little Queen of Spades" (take 1)	Vocalion 04108	2:11
6.	"Malted Milk"	Vocalion 03665	2:17
7.	"Drunken Hearted Man" (take 1)	Columbia 30034	2:24
8.	"Me and the Devil Blues" (take 1)	Vocalion 04108	2:37
9.	"Stop Breakin' Down Blues" (take 2)	Vocalion 04002	2:21
10.	"Traveling Riverside Blues" (take 1)	CK 65746	2:39
11.	"Honeymoon Blues"	Vocalion 04002	2:16
12.	"Love in Vain Blues" (take 2)	Vocalion 04630	2:19
13.	"Milkcow's Calf Blues" (take 2)	Vocalion 03665	2:20
14.	"Little Queen of Spades" (take 2)	Columbia 30034	2:15
15.	"Drunken Hearted Man" (take 2)	C3/C2T/CK 46222	2:19
16.	"Me and the Devil Blues" (take 2)	Columbia CL 1654	2:29
17.	"Stop Breakin' Down Blues" (take 1)	Columbia 30034	2:16
18.	"Traveling Riverside Blues" (take 2)	Columbia CL 1654	2:47
19.	"Love in Vain Blues" (take 1)	Columbia 30034	2:28
20.	"Milkcow's Calf Blues" (take 3)	Columbia CL 1654	2:14

== Personnel ==
- Robert Johnson – acoustic guitar, vocals
- Don Law – original recording producer
- Vincent Liebler – original recording engineer
- Laurence Cohen – Columbia "Roots ‘n’ Blues Series" producer
- Frank Driggs – reissue producer
- Stephen LaVere – reissue producer

== 1995 rerelease ==
The Penguin Guide to Blues Recordings reports that a 1995 rerelease of the album had improved sound, resulting from better source material and remastering. In addition to a maximum four-star rating, the guide awarded this reissue a “crown”, indicating a CD of exceptional merit.

== 2011 reissue ==
A new remastered edition of the album was released in 2011 in commemoration of Johnson's 100th birthday. The Centennial Collection was released in both standard and deluxe editions. The track order was changed so that all of the alternate takes were placed at the end of the discs, rather than side by side with the master tracks—as the 1990 release had placed them. Included on this edition, is a previously unissued take of "Traveling Riverside Blues" (DAL.400-1) which was previously thought to be one of 19 Robert Johnson Recordings that were lost or destroyed. It was found in the archives of Alan Lomax, which had been purchased by the American Folklife Center of the Library of Congress.

== Certifications ==
Region	Certification	Certified units/sales
United Kingdom (BPI)	Silver	60,000^{‡}
United States (RIAA)	Platinum	1,000,000^{^}
^{^} Shipments figures based on certification alone.^{‡} Sales+streaming figures based on certification alone.

== See also ==
- King of the Delta Blues Singers
- King of the Delta Blues Singers, Vol. II
