= Me and Mr. Johnson =

2004 studio album by Eric Clapton

Studio album by Eric Clapton
- Released: 23 March 2004
- Recorded: 2004
- Studios: The Town House, London
- Genres: Blues; blues rock
- Length: 49:31
- Label: Reprise
- Producers: Eric Clapton; Simon Climie

Eric Clapton chronology
One More Car, One More Rider (2002)	Me and Mr. Johnson (2004)	Sessions for Robert J (2004)

Singles from Me and Mr. Johnson
- 1. "If I Had Possession Over Judgement Day (Promotional)" Released: March 2004; 2. "Come On in My Kitchen" Released: April 2004

Me and Mr. Johnson is the fifteenth solo studio album recorded by Eric Clapton, released in March 2004 by Reprise Records. It consists of covers of songs written and originally recorded by Robert Johnson. The album cover was painted by Sir Peter Blake, using a series of photographs of Clapton. Clapton had planned to record an album of new material, but by the time of the recording sessions there were not enough new songs written, so the band instead recorded a series of Johnson songs.

Me and Mr. Johnson sold more than two million albums worldwide and reached the Top 10 in more than 15 countries. A companion album and video release entitled Sessions for Robert J was released on 7 December 2004, and featured different versions of each of the songs from the studio album.

== Background ==
At the beginning of 2004, Clapton set out to record a new album, working with his long-time collaborator Simon Climie on several songs that Clapton wrote about love, peace and happiness. However, when it came time to record in the studio, there were not enough finished songs for an album, so Clapton suggested the band play some songs composed by Delta blues great Robert Johnson. In just two weeks, Clapton and his studio band – Andy Fairweather Low, Billy Preston, Steve Gadd, Doyle Bramhall II, and Nathan East – recorded an entire album consisting of Johnson cover songs. Clapton was very pleased with the recordings, as was Warner Bros. Records and Reprise Records manager Tom Whalley. Clapton eventually finished his original material, which was released on the album Back Home in 2005.

On February 2004, Clapton was interviewed about his new studio album:

"It is a remarkable thing to have been driven and influenced all of my life by the work of one man", Clapton said. "And even though I accept that it has always been the keystone of my musical foundation, I still would not regard it as an obsession; instead, I prefer to think of it as a landmark that I navigate by, whenever I feel myself going adrift. I am talking, of course, about the work of Robert Johnson. Up until I heard his music, everything I had ever heard seemed as if it was dressed up for a shop window somewhere, so that when I heard him for the first time, it was like he was singing only for himself, and now and then, maybe God. At first, it scared me in its intensity, and I could only take it in small doses. Then I would build up strength and take a little more, but I could never really get away from it, and in the end, it spoiled me for everything else. Now, after all these years, his music is like my oldest friend, always in the back of my head, and on the horizon. It is the finest music I have ever heard. I have always trusted its purity, and I always will".

== Critical reception ==
Professional ratings
Review scores
Source	Rating
The Penguin Guide to Blues Recordings	2.5/4 stars
AllMusic	3.5/5 stars
Blender	3/5 stars

AllMusic critic Stephen Thomas Erlewine notes Clapton sounds very "comfortable and relaxed" on the album, "as if he was having fun making music". Erlewine calls the album "simply the most enjoyable record he's made" since From the Cradle with the possible exception of Riding with the King. Comparing the album to From the Cradle, the music critic notes: "in some respects it's a better blues album than that since it never sounds as doggedly serious as that guitar-heavy affair". Erlewine finishes his review liking the album: "Some [...] may find the album too slickly produced – admittedly, blues albums should never boast a credit for Pro Tools, as this does – but this is a heartfelt tribute that's among Clapton's most purely enjoyable albums". He awarded the release three and a half out of five possible stars. Rolling Stone critic David Fricke felt that "Clapton [goes] back to blues school on [this] cover [album], but [does] so with mutual fealty and honest delight". He notes that Clapton limits his guitar solos to "a blistering chorus or two" in some of the songs, "to better show off the dirty-rubber swing of Clapton's longtime road-and-studio band". The journalist finishes his review finding "Clapton pays broad tribute to Johnson as a composer and public-domain synthesist". The British Uncut magazine liked the background work of Clapton's studio band, as they seem to be an "authentic, bottomless thump" to the Johnson tunes and leave Clapton enough space to play "devastating" guitar and sing "like a man who has faced down more than a few canine devils of his own". The magazine awarded the release four out of five points.

Journalist Edna Gundersen from USA Today calls the 2004 studio album a "homage to the genre's godfather in 14 electric versions of acoustic blueprints that laid the groundwork for the '60s rock explosion" and rates the album with three and a half out of four possible stars, calling the songs "greasy as they are graceful, conveying an earthy intensity". Critic Robert Gauthier from Entertainment Weekly opined that Me and Mr. Johnson "will likely become a coffee-table album" and notes "Clapton sounds reinvigorated in these 14 songs by "Crossroads" soul-salesman Robert Johnson, with phlegm in his throat and (relative) fire in his belly". He also liked Billy Preston's work on keyboards and awarded the release a "B+" rating, meaning "very good". Rob Webb from BBC Music feels that: "Clapton is no longer God: he now plays the Devil. For him to take on Johnson's catalogue makes perfect sense. With both wailing electric guitar and acoustic-slide under his arm, Eric runs through 'When You Got a Good Friend', 'Milkcow's Calf Blues', 'Come On In My Kitchen' and a dozen other tried and tested Johnson tunes. They are all delivered with sincerity, love and respect. The band are as tight as a bottle-stop, the recording is as clear as a bell and Clapton's singing and playing sound just fine. Me and Mr Johnson will appeal to his AOR audience after a bit of authentic as much as it will to staunch blues fans hungry for digital-age renditions of Johnson standards". Billboard critic Christopher Walsh thinks that on Me and Mr. Johnson "Clapton is in fine form, setting aside the slick instrumentation and production that have marked much of his more recent work in favor of a smaller ensemble", creating as the result "a sparse sound, allowing Clapton's usual outstanding lead and slide guitar work to shine. Clapton and the stellar musicians behind him are obviously passionate about the music". Although Walsh liked the music on the album, he would like Clapton to "let it loose" more.

== Track listing ==
All tracks are written by Robert Johnson.

Me and Mr. Johnson track listing
No.	Title	Length
1.	"When You Got a Good Friend"	3:20
2.	"Little Queen of Spades"	4:57
3.	"They're Red Hot"	3:25
4.	"Me and the Devil Blues"	2:56
5.	"Traveling Riverside Blues"	4:31
6.	"Last Fair Deal Gone Down"	2:35
7.	"Stop Breakin' Down Blues"	2:30
8.	"Milkcow's Calf Blues"	3:18
9.	"Kind Hearted Woman Blues"	4:06
10.	"Come on in My Kitchen"	3:35
11.	"If I Had Possession Over Judgement Day"	3:27
12.	"Love in Vain"	4:02
13.	"32-20 Blues"	2:58
14.	"Hellhound on My Trail"	3:51
Total length:		49:31

== Personnel ==
- Eric Clapton – vocals, guitars, slide guitar
- Billy Preston – acoustic piano, Hammond organ
- Andy Fairweather Low – guitars
- Doyle Bramhall II – guitars, slide guitar
- Nathan East – bass (1–4, 6–14)
- Pino Palladino – bass (5)
- Steve Gadd – drums (1–4, 6–14)
- Jim Keltner – drums (5)
- Jerry Portnoy – harmonica

== Production ==
- Producers – Eric Clapton and Simon Climie
- Recording Engineer – Alan Douglas
- Second Assistant Engineer – Bea Henkel
- Assistant Engineers – Philippe Rose and Tom Stanley
- Mixed by Mick Guzauski
- Mix Assistant – Tom Bender.
- Pro Tools Engineer – Simon Climie
- Additional Pro Tools – Joel Evenden and Jonathan Shakhovsky
- Mastered by Bob Ludwig at Gateway Mastering (Portland, ME).
- Guitar Technician – Lee Dickson
- Project Coordinator – Mick Double
- Album Cover Concept and Liner Notes – Eric Clapton
- Cover Illustration – Peter Blake
- Design – Catherine Roylance
- Photography – Toru Moriyama

== Commercial success ==
=== North America and Asia ===
When the album was officially announced, experts from the American Billboard magazine concluded Me and Mr. Johnson would sell more than 100,000 copies in its first week on the U.S. Billboard 200 album chart. As it turned out, the blues cover album sold 128,000 copies in its first week in the U.S., peaking at number six on the Billboard chart in 2004. The album reached the same position on the magazine's Top Internet Albums chart and topped the Billboard Blues albums chart for a total of eleven weeks and stayed 90 weeks on the chart. While charting on the Top 200 albums chart in its twelfth week, Me and Mr. Johnson became the week's greatest gainer with sales of 17,000 copies in July 2004. On 7 July the same year, the album was certified with a gold disc by the Recording Industry Association of America (RIAA) commemorating sales of 500,000 copies in the U.S. The album stayed a total of 18 weeks on the Billboard 200 albums chart. Overall in 2004, Me and Mr. Johnson was the 137th best-selling album as well as the 21st most-purchased album over the Internet and the best-selling blues album in the United States for this period. In 2005, the album was the 5th best-selling blues album in North America. In Canada, the album peaked at number three on the Canadian Albums Chart, compiled by the Billboard magazine and was later awarded a Gold presentation by the Canadian Recording Industry Association (CRIA), selling more than 50,000 copies in the country. However, the album went on to sale more than 60,000 units. In Japan, the album peaked at number eight on the Oricon albums chart in 2004 and went on to become the 84th best-selling album in Japan in 2004. It was also certified with a Gold disc in that region by the Recording Industry Association of Japan (RIAJ) for sales exceeding 100,000 copies and had sold more than 150,000 copies in the nation. In South Korea, the album sold about 2,500 copies and peaked at number seven on the Gaon albums chart for international releases. The album reached position 22 in the state of Hong Kong.

=== Africa, South America and Oceania ===
In South Africa, the album peaked at number three on the charts, compiled by the Recording Industry of South Africa (RiSA). Me and Mr. Johnson was also successful in South America, as it went to number nine on the Mexican albums chart and stayed a total of 32 weeks on the official albums chart compiled by Asociación Mexicana de Productores de Fonogramas y Videogramas (AMPROFON) for the nation. A little less successful was the release in Brazil, where the album only peaked at number 49 on the album charts and stayed just two weeks on the Associação Brasileira dos Produtores de Discos (ABPD) compilation. In Oceania, the album was slightly more successful as it peaked at number 23 on the ARIA charts in Australia, where it stayed three weeks on chart. For the year-ending of 2001, Me and Mr. Johnson was the 11th best-selling Jazz/Blues album in the country. In New Zealand however, the album was certified with a Platinum disc by the Recording Industry Association of New Zealand (RIANZ), exceeding sales figures of more than 15,000 copies in the country as Me and Mr. Johnson peaked at number 14 and stayed four weeks on chart.

== Charts and certifications ==
=== Weekly charts ===
Chart (2004–06)	Peak position
Australian Albums (ARIA)	23
Australian Jazz/Blues Albums (ARIA)	4
Austrian Albums (Ö3 Austria)	5
Belgian Albums (Ultratop Flanders)	12
Belgian Albums (Ultratop Wallonia)	16
Brazilian Albums (ABPD)	49
Canadian Albums (Billboard)	3
Czech Albums (ČNS IFPI)	41
Danish Albums (Hitlisten)	9
Dutch Albums (Album Top 100)	12
European Albums (IFPI)	5
Finnish Albums (Suomen virallinen lista)	11
French Albums (SNEP)	11
French Back Catalogue (SNEP)	3
German Albums (Offizielle Top 100)	8
Greek Albums (IFPI)	3
Hong Kong Albums (IFPI)	22
Hungarian Albums (MAHASZ)	30
Irish Albums (IRMA)	33
Italian Albums (FIMI)	9
Japanese Albums (Oricon)	8
Korean Albums (Gaon)	7
Mexican Albums (Top 100 Mexico)	9
New Zealand Albums (RMNZ)	14
Norwegian Albums (VG-lista)	14
Polish Albums (ZPAV)	21
Portuguese Albums (AFP)	27
Scottish Albums (Official Charts)	17
Spanish Albums (PROMUSICAE)	7
Swedish Albums (Sverigetopplistan)	7
Swiss Albums (Schweizer Hitparade)	7
UK Albums (Official Charts)	10
US Billboard 200	6
US Top Blues Albums (Billboard)	1
US Top Internet Albums (Billboard)	6
Yugoslavian Albums (Džuboks)	11

=== Year-end charts ===
Chart (2004)	Position
Australian Jazz/Blues Albums (ARIA)	11
Austrian Albums (Ö3 Austria)	132
Danish Albums (Hitlisten)	92
Dutch Albums (Album Top 100)	81
French Albums (SNEP)	182
German Albums (Offizielle Top 100)	120
Japanese Albums (Oricon)	84
Swiss Albums (Schweizer Hitparade)	92
UK Albums (OCC)	123
US Billboard 200	137
US Top Blues Albums (Billboard)	1
US Top Internet Albums (Billboard)	21

Chart (2005)	Position
US Top Blues Albums (Billboard)	5

=== Certifications ===
Region	Certification	Certified units/sales
Belgium (BRMA)	Gold	25,000^{*}
Canada (Music Canada)	Gold	60,000
Denmark (IFPI Danmark)	Platinum	40,000^{^}
France (SNEP)	Gold	170,000
Greece (IFPI Greece)	Platinum	20,000^{^}
Hungary (MAHASZ)	Platinum	20,000^{^}
Italy (FIMI)	Platinum	100,000^{*}
Japan (RIAJ)	Gold	150,000
New Zealand (RMNZ)	Platinum	15,000^{^}
Norway (IFPI Norway)	Gold	20,000^{*}
Spain (Promusicae)	Gold	50,000^{^}
Sweden (GLF)	Gold	30,000^{^}
United Kingdom (BPI)	Gold	100,000^{*}
United States (RIAA)	Gold	500,000^{^}
Summaries
Europe (IFPI)	Platinum	1,000,000^{*}
^{*} Sales figures based on certification alone.^{^} Shipments figures based on certification alone.
