= King of the Delta Blues Singers, Vol. II =

Compilation album by Robert Johnson
- Released: 1970
- Recorded: San Antonio, Texas, November 1936; Dallas, Texas, June 1937
- Genre: Delta blues
- Length: 41:00
- Label: Columbia
- Producers: Don Law (original recordings); Frank Driggs (reissue)

Robert Johnson chronology
King of the Delta Blues Singers (1961)	King of the Delta Blues Singers, Vol. II (1970)	The Complete Recordings (1990)

Professional ratings
Review scores
Source	Rating
AllMusic	5/5 stars
The Hartford Courant	(favorable)
Los Angeles Times	(favorable)
New York Times	(favorable)
PopMatters	(favorable)
Rolling Stone	(favorable)
Sing Out!	(favorable)
Stereo Review	(favorable)
Encyclopedia of Popular Music	5/5 stars
The Penguin Guide to Blues Recordings	(2004 reissue) + “crown”

King of the Delta Blues Singers, Vol. II is a compilation album by American blues musician Robert Johnson, released in 1970 by Columbia Records. In 2003, the album was ranked number 424 on Rolling Stone magazine's list of the 500 greatest albums of all time.

== Music ==
The album collects sixteen recordings, ten of which were previously available as 78 rpm records on the Vocalion label and were originally recorded during five sessions in 1936 and 1937. Through the course of the 1960s, blues music had become more visible in the popular music landscape of the day. Songs from Johnson's first album had been covered by popular rock artists in the late sixties, including Eric Clapton and the Rolling Stones.

Based on the success of that album, Columbia decided it was time to issue another Johnson album with Frank Driggs, the legendary producer and music historian, once again producing. They scoured the vaults again and came up with nine additional Vocalion masters, three unreleased alternate takes and two unreleased tracks ("Phonograph Blues" and "Drunken Hearted Man" were both from the San Antonio recordings, but were never released by Vocalion). Likely finding no further acceptable recordings, to bring the number of tracks to the same sixteen as on Volume I, "Ramblin' On My Mind" take one, Vocalion 3519 (the 1961 LP featured take two, Kind Hearted Woman Blues take one, Vocalion 3416 (the 1961 LP featured take two) and "Preachin' Blues" from the earlier LP was issued again as the alternate take had been lost.

Although not quite as popular or influential as its predecessor, it includes recordings of two Johnson songs that have become blues standards, "Sweet Home Chicago" and "I Believe I'll Dust My Broom." In contrast to the deeply emotive songs released on the 1961 album, many of the tracks on Volume II display Johnson's lighter side.

King of the Delta Blues Singers, Vol. II was reissued on August 10, 2004 by the Legacy Records subsidiary of Sony Music Entertainment, with the master version of "Ramblin' On My Mind" added as a bonus track.

== Track listing ==
=== Side one ===
Track	Song title	Recorded	Catalogue	Released	Time
1.	"Kind Hearted Woman Blues"	November 23, 1936	Vocalion 3416	1937	2:28
2.	"I Believe I'll Dust My Broom"	November 23, 1936	Vocalion 3475	1937	2:57
3.	"Sweet Home Chicago"	November 23, 1936	Vocalion 3601	1937	2:57
4.	"Ramblin' On My Mind"	November 23, 1936	Vocalion 3519	1937	2:50
5.	"Phonograph Blues"	November 23, 1936	previously unreleased	1970	2:38
6.	"They're Red Hot"	November 27, 1936	Vocalion 3563	1937	2:56
7.	"Dead Shrimp Blues"	November 27, 1936	Vocalion 3475	1937	2:29
8.	"Preaching Blues"	November 27, 1936	Columbia LP-1654	1939	2:49

=== Side two ===
Track	Song title	Recorded	Catalogue	Released	Time
1.	"I'm a Steady Rollin' Man"	June 19, 1937	Vocalion 3723	1937	2:35
2.	"From Four Till Late"	June 19, 1937	Vocalion 3623	1937	2:20
3.	"Little Queen of Spades"	June 20, 1937	unreleased alternate take	1970	2:16
4.	"Malted Milk"	June 20, 1937	Vocalion 3665	1937	2:20
5.	"Drunken Hearted Man"	June 20, 1937	previously unreleased	1970	2:26
6.	"Stop Breakin' Down Blues"	June 20, 1937	unreleased alternate take	1970	2:21
7.	"Honeymoon Blues"	June 20, 1937	Vocalion 4002	1938	2:16
8.	"Love in Vain"	June 20, 1937	unreleased alternate take	1970	2:20

=== 2004 reissue bonus track ===
Track	Song title	Recorded	Catalogue	Released	Time
17.	"Ramblin' on My Mind"	November 23, 1936	Vocalion 3519	1937	2:23
