= When You Got a Good Friend =

1936 song by Robert Johnson

Song by Robert Johnson

from the album King of the Delta Blues Singers
- Released: 1961
- Recorded: November 23, 1936
- Studio: Gunter Hotel, San Antonio, Texas
- Genre: Blues
- Length: 2:56
- Label: Columbia
- Songwriter: Robert Johnson
- Producer: Don Law

"When You Got a Good Friend" is a blues song recorded on November 23, 1936, in San Antonio, Texas, by Robert Johnson. The song was unissued until 1961, when it was included on the LP King of the Delta Blues Singers.

Johnson performed the song in the key of E, and recorded two takes, the second of which was used for the LP. Both takes are included on the album The Complete Recordings.

The song uses the melody made popular by the hit record M & O Blues by Walter Davis. Johnson composed two songs to this melody - "Ramblin' On My Mind" and "When You Got A Good Friend" - with different musical approaches and different guitar tunings, although both were in the key of E.

Eric Clapton recorded the song for the 2004 album Me and Mr. Johnson.
