= Dead Shrimp Blues =

- Original 78 record label

Single by Robert Johnson
- Released: April 1937
- Recorded: November 27, 1936
- Studio: Gunter Hotel, San Antonio, Texas
- Genre: Blues
- Length: 2:31
- Label: Vocalion; ARC; Conqueror
- Songwriter(s): Robert Johnson
- Producer(s): Don Law

"Dead Shrimp Blues" is a song written by Robert Johnson.

It is from the recording sessions of November 26 and 27, 1936, in San Antonio, Texas along with "32-20 Blues", "They're Red Hot", "Cross Road Blues", "Walkin' Blues", "Last Fair Deal Gone Down", "Preaching Blues" and "If I Had Possession Over Judgement Day".
