= Last Fair Deal Gone Down =

Single by Robert Johnson
- Released: April 1937
- Recorded: November 27, 1936
- Studio: Gunter Hotel, San Antonio, Texas
- Genre: Blues
- Length: 2:39
- Label: Vocalion, ARC
- Songwriter(s): Robert Johnson
- Producer(s): Don Law

"Last Fair Deal Gone Down" is a song by American blues musician Robert Johnson. It was recorded during Johnson's third recording session in San Antonio, Texas, on November 27, 1936. The song was released on a 78 rpm record in April the following year by Vocalion Records as the second side of "32-20 Blues". It was included on the first reissue of Johnson's songs, King of the Delta Blues Singers in 1961. In 1990, it was released on compact disc as part of The Complete Recordings box set, and in 2000 it was included in Harry Smith's Anthology of American Folk Music, Vol. 4.

The song connects some scenes of gambling, work and romance, by situating them on the Gulf and Ship Island Railroad. The expression "Deal Go Down" comes from the card game "Georgia Skin".

The railroad serves as more than a setting; Max Haymes finds, in the one unclear verse, a furious description of the convict lease work used when the railroad was laid, before Johnson was born. Elijah Wald agrees that the song features lyrics and structure of an archaic work song, similar to "It Makes A Long Time Man Feel Bad"; the traditional melody and structure were adapted from Charley Patton's record, "You're Gonna Need Somebody When You Die" (1929), its lyrics discarded. David Brackett describes the musical changes, "Johnson modifies this arrangement, simplifying the high-register slide part... and adding a contrasting syncopated figure in the middle of the recording (but omitting the sermon)." But Wald traces also lyrics borrowed from the song "Don’t Let Your Deal Go Down", recorded by Fiddlin' John Carson among others, which might have suggested to Johnson some of the changes in arrangement.
