= From Four Until Late =

- Original 78 record label

Single by Robert Johnson
- Released: 1937
- Recorded: Dallas, Texas, June 19, 1937
- Genre: Blues
- Length: 2:23
- Label: Vocalion, ARC
- Songwriter(s): Robert Johnson
- Producer(s): Don Law

"From Four Until Late" (or "From Four Till Late") is a blues song written by Delta blues musician Robert Johnson. He recorded it in Dallas, Texas, during his penultimate session for producer Don Law on June 19, 1937. The lyrics contained his philosophical lines of "a man is like a prisoner, and he's never satisfied".

British rock group Cream recorded the song for their debut album Fresh Cream in 1966. Guitarist Eric Clapton provided the lead vocal. Clapton also recorded another version of the song on his Sessions for Robert J album in 2004.

"Four Until Late"
29 seconds of Cream's rendition
