= Mojo (magazine) =

British monthly music magazine

- February 2008 issue of Mojo
- Editor: John Mulvey (Nov 2017–present)
- Categories: Music magazine
- Frequency: Monthly
- Total circulation: 62,733 (Dec 2022)
- First issue: November 1993
- Company: Bauer Media Group
- Country: England
- Based in: London
- Language: English
- Website: mojo4music.com
- ISSN: 1351-0193

Mojo is a popular music magazine published monthly in the United Kingdom, initially by Emap, and since January 2008 by Bauer.

Following the success of the magazine Q, publishers Emap were looking for a title that would cater for the burgeoning interest in classic rock music. The magazine was designed to appeal to the 30 to 45-plus age group, or the baby boomer generation. Mojo was first published on 15 October 1993. In keeping with its classic rock aesthetic, the first issue had Bob Dylan and John Lennon as its cover stars. Noted for its in-depth coverage of both popular and cult acts, it acted as the inspiration for Blender and Uncut. Many noted music critics have written for the magazine including Charles Shaar Murray, Greil Marcus, Nick Kent, David Fricke, Jon Savage, and Mick Wall. The launch editor of Mojo was Paul Du Noyer and his successors have included Mat Snow, Paul Trynka, Pat Gilbert, and Phil Alexander. The current editor is John Mulvey.

While Mojo frequently covers classic rock acts such as the Beatles, David Bowie, the Rolling Stones, the Who, and Paul Weller, it has also featured many newer and "left-field" acts. It was the first mainstream magazine in the UK to focus on the White Stripes, and it continues to cover emerging acts. Modern cover stars of recent years have included Lana Del Rey and Arctic Monkeys. It regularly includes a covermount CD that ties in with a current magazine article or theme. It introduced the Mojo Honours List, an awards ceremony that is a mixture of readers' and critics' awards, in 2004.

In early 2010, Mojo was involved in a controversial move by its new parent company, Bauer, to unilaterally impose a new contract on all photographers and writers, taking away their copyright, and offloading liability for libel or copyright infringement from the publisher onto the contributor. Two hundred photographers and writers from Mojo and Bauer's other music magazines, Kerrang! and Q, were reported as refusing to work under the new terms.

== Lists ==
More recently, the magazine has taken to publishing many "Top 100" lists, including the subjects of drug songs (Mojo #109), rock epics (Mojo #125), protest songs (Mojo #126) and even the most miserable songs of all time (Mojo #127). To celebrate 150 issues, the magazine published a "Top 100 Albums of Mojo's Lifetime" list (essentially 1993 to 2006). The top five for this list were:

1. Grace – Jeff Buckley (1994)
2. American Recordings – Johnny Cash (1994)
3. OK Computer – Radiohead (1997)
4. Time Out of Mind – Bob Dylan (1997)
5. Definitely Maybe – Oasis (1994)

In 2007, the magazine set out to determine "The Top 100 Records That Changed the World". The list was compiled and voted on by an eclectic panel of superstars, including Björk, Tori Amos, Tom Waits, Brian Wilson, Pete Wentz, and Steve Earle. Little Richard's 1955 hit "Tutti Frutti" took the number-one spot. Richard's record beat the Beatles' "I Want to Hold Your Hand" (second) and Elvis Presley's "Heartbreak Hotel" (third). The magazine's editors wrote that "the 100 albums, singles and 78s that made up the list make up the most influential and inspirational recordings ever made". Hailing "Tutti Frutti" as the sound of the birth of rock 'n' roll, the editors went on to state that "one can only imagine how it must have sounded when the song exploded across the airwaves!"

The top ten on Mojo's "100 Records That Changed the World" list are:

1. "Tutti Frutti" by Little Richard
2. "I Want to Hold Your Hand" by the Beatles
3. "Heartbreak Hotel" by Elvis Presley
4. The Freewheelin' Bob Dylan by Bob Dylan
5. Autobahn by Kraftwerk
6. King of the Delta Blues Singers by Robert Johnson
7. The Velvet Underground & Nico by the Velvet Underground and Nico
8. Anthology of American Folk Music (various artists)
9. "What'd I Say" by Ray Charles
10. "God Save the Queen" by the Sex Pistols

Other lists include a Top 50 of songs by a particular artist from time to time, usually compiled by a panel of music journalists and musicians. Featured artists have included David Bowie, Pink Floyd, the Beach Boys, the Who, Bruce Springsteen, and Neil Young.

== Special editions ==
Cover of issue #300

After the success of an all-Beatles issue published to mark the release of The Beatles Anthology in 1995, many stand-alone, special editions of Mojo have been produced, devoting an entire magazine to one artist or genre. Three of the most successful were the series (produced by then special editions editor Chris Hunt) telling the story of the Beatles – one thousand days at a time. Featuring contributions from many of the world's leading rock critics and Beatles experts, such as Hunter Davies, Mark Lewisohn, Richard Williams, Ian MacDonald, Peter Doggett, and Alan Clayson, the three magazines were published between 2002 and 2003, before being collected together by editor-in-chief Paul Trynka and published as the book The Beatles: Ten Years That Shook The World (Dorling Kindersley, 2004).

Other special editions have focused on Pink Floyd, psychedelia, punk, and the 1960s. Mojo has also published four editions of "The MOJO Collection: The Greatest Albums Of All Time" (Canongate Books), originally edited by the magazine's founding features editor, Jim Irvin, and a series of short, definitive biographies under the imprint Mojo Heroes, starting in 2002 with Neil Young: Reflections In Broken Glass, written by Sylvie Simmons, a longtime Mojo contributing editor.

== Mojo Radio ==
The company behind the magazine, Bauer, also produced a digital radio station. This station was called Mojo Radio, and was transmitted on the digital television networks in the UK (Freeview channel 721 and Sky Digital channel 0182, though not Virgin Media) and online. The output of the station was based on that of the magazine. It was announced on 5 November 2008 that Mojo Radio would cease broadcasting on 30 November 2008, in order to save Bauer the financial outlay.

== Mojo Rocks ==
The magazine's former editor-in-chief, Phil Alexander, had a regular show on the UK digital radio station Planet Rock entitled Mojo Rocks, in which he followed a Mojo-inspired playlist.
