= Kind Hearted Woman Blues =

- Original 78 record label

Single by Robert Johnson
- Released: March 1937
- Recorded: November 23, 1936
- Studio: Gunter Hotel, San Antonio, Texas
- Genre: Blues
- Length: 2:52
- Label: Vocalion, ARC
- Songwriter: Robert Johnson
- Producer: Don Law

"Kind Hearted Woman Blues" is a blues song recorded on November 23, 1936, in San Antonio, Texas, by the American Delta bluesman Robert Johnson. The song was originally released on 78 rpm format as Vocalion 03416 and ARC 7-03-56. Johnson performed the song in the key of A, and recorded two takes, the first of which contains his only recorded guitar solo. Both takes were used for different pressings of both the Vocalion issue and the ARC issue. The first take (SA-2580-1) can be found on many compilation albums, including the first one, King of the Delta Blues Singers (1961). Take 2 (SA-2580-2) can be heard on the later compilation Robert Johnson, The Complete Recordings (1990).

== Influences ==
This was the first song that Johnson recorded, and it was carefully crafted in imitation of recent hit records. It was composed in a similar style to "Cruel Hearted Woman Blues" by Bumble Bee Slim (Amos Easton), which in turn was based on "Mean Mistreater Mama" by Leroy Carr accompanied by Scrapper Blackwell. Johnson uses the Carr melody and conveys something of Carr's style in his relaxed singing. His guitar accompaniment echoes Carr's piano phrases in the first verse, then copies Blackwell's guitar phrases in the second verse. He then adds a musical bridge in the style of another hit record, "Milk Cow Blues" by Kokomo Arnold. At the end of the bridge, he jumps into a higher register as Arnold does, but then maintains a controlled falsetto, which may have been based on the singing of Joe Pullum. Johnson combined these elements of the styles of others into an individual style of his own.

Like Bumble Bee Slim, Johnson wrote lyrics consisting mostly of conventional twelve-bar three-line verses, but varied with an eight-bar bridge. Slim's bridge merely repeated the words, but Johnson wrote a more complex sequence:

"Cruel Hearted Woman Blues"	"Kind Hearted Woman Blues"
You's a cruel-hearted woman, swear, — and you treat me like a slave ...... x 2 You keep me fallin' — down on my bending knee	I got a kind hearted woman, — do anything in this world for me ...... x 2 But these evil-hearted women, — man, they will not let me be
Do you remember one mornin' — when the lights was burnin' low You give me my clothes — and drove me from your door Do you remember one mornin' — when the lights was burnin' low You give me my clothes — and drove me from your door	There ain't but the one thing — make Mr Johnson drink I swear how you treat me Baby, — I begin to think Oh Babe — my life don't feel the same You break my heart — when you call Mister So-and-so's name

Johnson also makes a marked change in tone. Leroy Carr's original "Mean Mistreating Mama" was resigned, even understanding:

You're a mean mistreating mama, and you don't mean me no good
And I don't blame you baby, I'd be the same way if I could

Bumble Bee Slim removed that hint of sympathy when he covered the song as "Mean Mistreatin' Woman":

You's a mean mistreatin' woman, but I love you just the same
I know you didn't want me, the day I changed your name

When he wrote new words to the tune, his mood was still resigned:

You's a cruel heated woman, swear, and you just can't realise
That's all right baby, I'll be the same when I rise

Johnson decides that his "kind-hearted woman" is, after all, hostile. But there is no resignation, only anguish:

I love my baby, my baby don't love me
And I really love that woman, can't stand to leave her be

She's a kind-hearted woman, she studies evil all the time
You wells to kill me, as to have it on your mind

== Other versions ==
Like many of Johnson's songs, "Kind Hearted Woman Blues" is a staple in the repertoires of many blues musicians and has been recorded by dozens of traditional and contemporary blues figures, including Muddy Waters, Robert Lockwood, Jr., Johnny Winter, David Bromberg, George Thorogood, and Keb' Mo'. It was included on Eric Clapton's 2004 album, Me and Mr. Johnson, along with many other Johnson classics.

The Youngbloods recorded a version of the song and it was released as a B-side on two singles: "Dreamboat" in 1972 and "Running Bear" in 1972.

On Led Zeppelin's cover of Johnson's "Traveling Riverside Blues", singer Robert Plant quotes this song with the line: "Got a kind-hearted woman/she studies evil all the time".

Ralph McTell recorded the song for his second LP Spiral Staircase (1969)

According to Stephen Calt, the phrase kind-hearted woman was slang for a woman who "catered to a gigolo in return for sexual fidelity".
