= Stop Breaking Down =

Song first recorded by Robert Johnson in 1937

"Stop Breakin' Down Blues"
- Original 78 record label

Single by Robert Johnson
- Released: 1938
- Recorded: Dallas, Texas, June 20, 1937
- Genre: Blues
- Length: 2:16 (take 1); 2:21 (take 2)
- Label: Vocalion
- Songwriter: Robert Johnson
- Producer: Don Law

"Stop Breaking Down" or "Stop Breakin' Down Blues" is a Delta blues song recorded by Robert Johnson in 1937. An "upbeat boogie with a strong chorus line", the lyrics are partly based on Johnson's experience with certain women:

You know the Saturday night women,
now they love to ape and clown
They won't do nothin'
but tear yo' reputation down
Stop breakin' down
Please stop breakin' down

The song shares elements with earlier blues songs and became popular largely through later interpretations by other artists, such as Sonny Boy Williamson I in 1945, the Rolling Stones in 1972. and the White Stripes in 1999.

== Recording and composition ==
Robert Johnson recorded "Stop Breakin' Down Blues" during his last recording session in 1937 in Dallas, Texas. The song is a solo piece with Johnson providing guitar accompaniment to his vocals. Several songs have been identified as "melodic precedents": "Caught Me Wrong Again" (Memphis Minnie, 1936), "Stop Hanging Around" (Buddy Moss, 1935), and "You Got to Move" (Memphis Minnie and Joe McCoy, 1934).

Of his Dallas recordings, it is Johnson's most uptempo song, with "his exhuberant vocal driv[ing] home the story line". Two takes of the song were recorded, both sounding very similar, although Johnson flubbed the opening verse of the second take. Although the song is played in a fretted guitar style, on both takes Johnson added a brief slide coda that comes across "like a little inside joke".

The second take was selected for release on March 20, 1938, with "Honeymoon Blues" as the flip side. In 1970, the first take was included on Johnson's King of the Delta Blues Singers, Vol. II album. Both were later included on the 1990 box set The Complete Recordings.

== Lawsuit ==
"Stop Breakin' Down Blues" (along with "Love in Vain") was the subject of a lawsuit regarding the copyright for the song. In 2000, the court held that the songs were not in the public domain and that legal title belonged to the Estate of Robert Johnson and its successors.

== Recordings by blues artists ==
In 1945, Sonny Boy Williamson I adapted the tune as an early Chicago blues with Big Maceo (piano), Tampa Red (guitar), and Charles Sanders (drums). Titled "Stop Breaking Down", the song featured somewhat different lyrics, including the refrain "I don't believe you really really love me, I think you just like the way my music sounds" in place of Johnson's "The stuff I got it gon' bust your brains out, hoo hoo, it'll make you lose your mind". Williamson's song inspired the versions sung "by most postwar Chicago blues artists".

In 1954, Baby Boy Warren recorded it as a Chicago-style blues shuffle, but used most of Johnson's lyrics. Forest City Joe recorded the song in 1959, which was released on a compilation album The Blues Roll On. In the late 1960s, Junior Wells with Buddy Guy recorded "Stop Breaking Down" for the Coming at You Baby (1968) and Southside Blues Jam (1969) albums. Their versions are medleys which incorporate lyrics from "Five Long Years" and Sonny Boy Williamson's "Stop Breaking Down".

== The Rolling Stones version ==
"Stop Breaking Down"

Song by the Rolling Stones

from the album Exile on Main St.
- Released: May 12, 1972
- Genre: Blues rock
- Length: 4:34
- Label: Rolling Stones Records
- Songwriter: Robert Johnson
- Producer: Jimmy Miller

The Rolling Stones recorded "Stop Breaking Down" for their 1972 Exile on Main St. album. They interpreted the song somewhat differently from the earlier versions, with prominent slide guitar work by Mick Taylor and Mick Jagger providing the harmonica and guitar. The Rolling Stones' only live performance of the song (with Robert Cray on slide guitar and lead vocals) is included on their The Rolling Stones: Voodoo Lounge Live concert DVD.

After the release of Exile on Main St., Allen Klein sued the Rolling Stones for breach of settlement because Jagger and Richards had created their version of "Stop Breaking Down" and composed four other songs on the album while they were under contract with his company, ABKCO. ABKCO acquired publishing rights to the songs, giving it a share of the royalties from Exile on Main St., and was able to publish another album of previously released Rolling Stones songs, More Hot Rocks (Big Hits & Fazed Cookies).

== The White Stripes version ==
"Stop Breaking Down"

Song by the White Stripes

from the album the White Stripes
- Released: June 15, 1999
- Genre: Blues rock
- Length: 2:20
- Label: Sympathy for the Record Industry
- Songwriter: Robert Johnson
- Producers: Jack White; Jim Diamond

The White Stripes recorded "Stop Breaking Down" for their 1999 self-titled debut album. Lead vocalist and guitarist Jack White learnt to play the slide guitar from Johnny Walker of the Soledad Brothers. Live performances have been included in deluxe editions of their later albums and B-sides.

AllMusic's Chris Handyside identified their choice as inspired and added that Jack's vocal delivery manages to convey Johnson's sense of desperation.
