= Love in Vain =

Robert Johnson blues composition

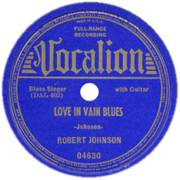

Single by Robert Johnson
- Released: 1939
- Recorded: Dallas, Texas, June 20, 1937
- Genre: Blues
- Length: 2:25
- Label: Vocalion
- Songwriter: Robert Johnson (Note: The liner notes to King of the Delta Blues Singers, Vol. II (1970) (the first release of "Love in Vain" since the 1939 78 rpm record) include "The selections are in the public domain".)
- Producer: Don Law

"Love in Vain" (originally "Love in Vain Blues") is a blues song written by American musician Robert Johnson. Johnson's performance – vocal accompanied by his finger-style acoustic guitar playing – has been described as "devastatingly bleak". He recorded the song in 1937 during his last recording session and in 1939 it was issued as the last of his original 78 rpm records.

"Love in Vain" has elements of earlier Delta blues songs and for a while it was believed to be in the public domain. In 1969, the Rolling Stones recorded an updated rendition featuring an electric slide guitar solo. The popularity of their adaptation led to a lawsuit over the copyright, which was eventually resolved in favor of Johnson's estate. Various artists have recorded the song.

== Background ==
In the late 1920s, Johnson began playing the guitar along with a rack-mounted harmonica. One of his influences was Leroy Carr, whose "How Long–How Long Blues" (1928) was an early favorite. Johnson later used the melody from Carr's "When the Sun Goes Down" (1935) as the basis for "Love in Vain". Both songs express a yearning and sorrow for the loss of a lover. Johnson also used some lyrics from "Flying Crow Blues" (1932) by the Shreveport Home Wreckers (a duo of Oscar "Buddy" Woods and Ed Schaffer) for the final verse of "Love in Vain". Sonny Boy Williamson II recorded a song with a similar title, "All My Love in Vain", but different lyrics.

== Lyrics and composition ==
AllMusic's Thomas Ward describes the song as "heartbreakingly potent coming from an artist of Johnson's calibre". He adds:

The song's opening verse is worth quoting in full, it's arguably the finest few lines that Johnson ever wrote "And I followed her to the station/with a suitcase in my hand/Well I followed her to the station/with a suitcase in my hand/Well it's hard to tell, it's hard to tell/When all your love's in vain". Never has Johnson's guitar been so subtle, so much in the background – the song's success is from the artist's longing vocal, and as such it's devastatingly bleak.

During the final verses, Johnson calls out to his lover, Willie Mae Powell. Years later, when she heard "Love in Vain" for the first time, she was visibly moved upon hearing her name.

== Releases ==
In 1939, Vocalion Records issued "Love in Vain Blues", backed by "Preachin' Blues (Up Jumped the Devil)", on a ten-inch 78 rpm record. It was released after Johnson's death and was the last of his original singles. After the release of Johnson's first compilation album, King of the Delta Blues Singers (1961), bootleg albums containing more of Johnson's 1930s singles were circulated. This was the first appearance of the song since its original release. Columbia Records responded by issuing King of the Delta Blues Singers, Vol. II (1970), which included an alternate take of "Love in Vain". The original single version was finally reissued (along with the alternate) by Columbia on the box set The Complete Recordings (1990). A remastered version of the alternate take is also included on King of the Delta Blues: The Complete Recordings (1996).

== Rolling Stones adaptation ==
"Love in Vain"

Song by the Rolling Stones

from the album Let It Bleed
- Released: December 5, 1969
- Recorded: May 1969
- Genre: Country blues
- Length: 4:22
- Label: Decca (UK); London (US)
- Songwriter: Robert Johnson (Note: The original Let It Bleed (1969) album notes list "Love in Vain – Written by Woody Payne". "Woody Payne" was one of Johnson's pseudonyms.)
- Producer: Jimmy Miller

The Rolling Stones played "Love in Vain" for the first time live at the Hyde Park on 5 July 1969 (The Stones in the Park, with their new member Mick Taylor on slide guitar) and recorded it for their 1969 album Let It Bleed. Critic Richie Unterberger describes it as "as close to the roots of acoustic down-home blues as the Stones ever got". Rolling Stones guitarist Keith Richards recalled:

For a time we thought the songs that were on that first album [King of the Delta Blues] were the only recordings (Robert Johnson had) made, and then suddenly around '67 or '68 up comes this second (bootleg) collection that included "Love in Vain". "Love in Vain" was such a beautiful song. Mick and I both loved it, and at the time I was working and playing around with Gram Parsons, and I started searching around for a different way to present it, because if we were going to record it there was no point in trying to copy the Robert Johnson style or ways and styles. We took it a little bit more country, a little bit more formalized, and Mick felt comfortable with that.

In a 1995 interview with Jann Wenner of Rolling Stone magazine, Mick Jagger commented on the song's arrangement:

We changed the arrangement quite a lot from Robert Johnson's. We put in extra chords that aren't there on the Robert Johnson version. Made it more country. And that's another strange song, because it's very poignant. Robert Johnson was a wonderful lyric writer, and his songs are quite often about love, but they're desolate.

Live performances of the song appear on Get Yer Ya-Ya's Out (1970) and Stripped (1995).

=== Personnel ===
- Mick Jagger – vocals
- Keith Richards – acoustic and electric slide guitar
- Bill Wyman – bass
- Charlie Watts – drums
- Ry Cooder – mandolin

== Lawsuit over copyright ==
"Love in Vain" (along with "Stop Breakin' Down Blues") was the subject of a lawsuit regarding the copyright for the song. In 2000, the court held that, according to US law, the songs were not in the public domain and that legal title belonged to the Estate of Robert Johnson and its successors.

== Recognition and influence ==
Robert Johnson's original "Love in Vain" was inducted into the Blues Foundation Hall of Fame as part of the 2011 "Robert Johnson Centennial" celebrations. Jazz singer Madeleine Peyroux adapted it for her 2011 album Standing on the Rooftop. An album review in The Guardian noted, "A major highlight is the echoing, gothic account of Johnson's 'Love in Vain'."

Love in Vain: A Vision of Robert Johnson is the title of an unproduced screenplay by Alan Greenberg. In it, he explores both the known facts and the myth surrounding Johnson. Keith Richards commented, "Finally someone has captured the central feel of this master musician and his times, and that man is Alan Greenberg. Take my word for it."

== Notes ==
Footnotes

Citations

References

- Charters, Samuel (1973). Robert Johnson. Oak Publications. ISBN 0-8256-0059-6.
- Gillett, Charlie (1972). The Sound of the City (2nd. Laurel printing 1973 ed.). New York City: Dell Publishing.
- Gioia, Ted (2008). Delta Blues (Norton Paperback 2009 ed.). New York City: W. W. Norton. ISBN 978-0-393-33750-1.
- Greenberg, Alan (1994). Love in Vain: A Vision of Robert Johnson. Da Capo Press. ISBN 0-306-80557-X.
- Headlam, Dave (1997). Covach, John; Boone, Graeme M. (eds.). Understanding Rock: Essays in Musical Analysis. Oxford, England: Oxford University Press. ISBN 978-0-19-510005-1.
- Hal Leonard (1995). "Love in Vain". The Blues. Milwaukee, Wisconsin: Hal Leonard. ISBN 0-79355-259-1.
- Herzhaft, Gerard (1992). "Crossroads". Encyclopedia of the Blues. Fayetteville, Arkansas: University of Arkansas Press. ISBN 1-55728-252-8.
- Komara, Edward (2007). The Road to Robert Johnson: The Genesis and Evolution of Blues in the Delta From the Late 1800s Through 1938. Milwaukee, Wisconsin: Hal Leonard. ISBN 978-0-634-00907-5.
- LaVere, Stephen (1990). The Complete Recordings (Box set booklet). Robert Johnson. New York City: Columbia Records. OCLC 24547399. C2K 46222.
- London Records (1969). Let It Bleed (Album notes). The Rolling Stones. New York City: London Records. OCLC 71463386. NPS-4.
- Palmer, Robert (1981). Deep Blues. New York City: Penguin Books. ISBN 0-14-006223-8.
- Pearson, Barry Lee; McCulloch, Bill (2008). Robert Johnson: Lost and Found. Champaign, Illinois: University of Illinois Press. ISBN 978-0-252-07528-5.
- Schroeder, Patricia R. (2004). Robert Johnson, Mythmaking, and Contemporary American Culture. Champaign, Illinois: University of Illinois Press. ISBN 978-0252029158.
- Wald, Elijah (2004). Escaping the Delta: Robert Johnson and the Invention of the Blues. New York City: Amistad. ISBN 978-0-06-052427-2.
- Wardlow, Gayle Dean (1998). Chasin' that Devil Music: Searching for the Blues. San Francisco: Backbeat Books. ISBN 0-87930-552-5.
- Waxman, Jon (1970). King of the Delta Blues Singers, Vol. II (Album notes). Robert Johnson. New York City: Columbia Records. C 30034.
- Wenner, Jann S. (December 14, 1995). "Mick Jagger Remembers". Rollingstone.com.
- Wyman, Bill (1991). Stone Alone: The Story of a Rock 'n' Roll Band (1st Signet Printing ed.). New York City: Penguin Group.
