= Chris Handyside =

American music critic and writer for music magazines

Chris Handyside is an American music critic and writer for music magazines including Spin and Rolling Stone as well as Detroit alternative newsweekly the Metro Times

He is also the author of "Fell in Love With A Band: The Story of the White Stripes" (St. Martin's Press, 2004) and the "History of American Music" series (Heinemann-Raintree, 2006)

== Work ==
In September 2004, Handyside published Fell in love with a Band, a comprehensive biography about Jack White and Meg White, otherwise known as The White Stripes. The biography delves into the childhoods of each member and talks about how the two met. It gives a full discography and provides more than 50 pictures.
