= King of the Delta Blues Singers =

Compilation album by Robert Johnson
- Released: 1961
- Recorded: San Antonio, Texas, November 1936; Dallas, Texas, June 1937
- Genre: Delta blues
- Length: 43:08
- Label: Columbia
- Producers: Don Law (original recordings); Frank Driggs (reissue)
- Compiler: Don Law

Robert Johnson chronology
King of the Delta Blues Singers (1961)	King of the Delta Blues Singers, Vol. II (1970)

King of the Delta Blues Singers is a compilation album by American Delta blues musician Robert Johnson, released in 1961 by Columbia Records. It is considered one of the most influential blues releases. In 2020, Rolling Stone ranked it number 374 on its list of the 500 Greatest Albums of All Time.

== Background ==
The album collects sixteen mono recordings, nine of which were previously available as 78 rpm records on the Vocalion label, which Johnson recorded during two sessions in 1936 and 1937. The records sold well in their target market of the American south and southwest, with "Terraplane Blues" a regional hit, but their sales figures never totaled more than 5000 or so. Legendary record producer John Hammond gave an advance copy of the album to his newest signing to Columbia, Bob Dylan, who had never heard of Johnson and who became mesmerized by the intensity of the recordings.

Hammond, who had searched for Johnson in 1938 to include him on the bill for the first of his From Spirituals to Swing concerts at Carnegie Hall, prodded Columbia to assemble this album during the height of the folk revival in the 1960s. It was among the first of the retrospective albums of folk, country, and blues artists of the 1920s and 1930s who were rediscovered in the wake of that revival, some of whom were located and invited to appear at events such as the Newport Folk Festival. Johnson's LP failed to make the charts, but the quality of his music was recognized and Johnson's reputation grew. The album became a badge of hip taste in the 1960s, evidenced by its appearance in the album cover photo to Bob Dylan's Bringing It All Back Home amid other emblems of counter-culture life.

== Release ==
The album was originally released by Columbia Records in 1961 as a mono LP. At the time of its release very little scholarship had been done on Johnson's life, and the album liner notes contain some inaccuracies and false conclusions, and a speculative portrait of Johnson's personality. As the two surviving portraits of him were discovered a decade later, the cover painting depicts a faceless musician in field clothes.

The album was followed in 1970 by King of the Delta Blues Singers, Vol. II, including the remaining recordings at that time available by Johnson not on this record. King of the Delta Blues Singers was reissued on September 15, 1998, by the Legacy Records subsidiary label of the Sony Corporation, with a newly discovered alternate version of "Traveling Riverside Blues" appended as a bonus track. The original recording engineer was Vincent Liebler. An interesting note is that both take one and take two of Kind Hearted Woman Blues were released on various versions of the Vocalion single. Featured on this LP is take two, while the 1970 LP features take one.

== Reception ==
Professional ratings
Review scores
Source	Rating
AllMusic	5/5 stars
Birmingham Post	5/5 stars
Down Beat	5/5 stars
Ebony	(favorable)
The New York Times	(favorable) 1969
The New York Times	(favorable) 1998
Texas Monthly	(favorable)
Vibe	(favorable)
Encyclopedia of Popular Music	5/5 stars
The Wall Street Journal	(favorable)
The Penguin Guide to Blues Recordings	(1998 reissue) + “crown”

The Los Angeles Times wrote that Johnson's recordings for the albums "revolutionized the Mississippi Delta style that became the foundation of the Chicago blues sound". The Wall Street Journal wrote that "when his album King of the Delta Blues Singers made its belated way to England in the mid-1960s, it energized a generation of musicians".

In 1980, King of the Delta Blues Singers became the first album to be inducted by the Blues Foundation into the Blues Hall of Fame. The Hartford Courant selected King of the Delta Blues Singers for its list of the 25 Pivotal Recordings That Defined Our Times (1999). In 2003, the album was ranked number 27 on Rolling Stone magazine's list of the 500 Greatest Albums of All Time, with its ranking dropping to number 374 on the 2020 update of the list. (The album was not included in the 2012 version of the Rolling Stone list, instead being replaced by The Complete Recordings at number 22.) Mojo magazine ranked it number six on its list of 100 Records That Changed the World (2007).

== Track listing ==
=== Side one ===
Track	Song Title	Recorded	Catalogue	Released	Time
1.	"Cross Road Blues"	November 27, 1936	unreleased alternate take	1961	2:28
2.	"Terraplane Blues"	November 23, 1936	Vocalion 3416	1937	2:58
3.	"Come On in My Kitchen"	November 23, 1936	unreleased alternate take	1961	2:46
4.	"Walkin' Blues"	November 27, 1936	Vocalion 3601	1937	2:28
5.	"Last Fair Deal Gone Down"	November 27, 1936	Vocalion 3445	1937	2:38
6.	"32-20 Blues"	November 26, 1936	Vocalion 3445	1937	2:50
7.	"Kind Hearted Woman Blues"	November 23, 1936	Vocalion 3416	1937	2:50
8.	"If I Had Possession Over Judgement Day"	November 27, 1936	previously unreleased	1961	2:34

=== Side two ===
Track	Song Title	Recorded	Catalogue	Released	Time
1.	"Preachin' Blues"	November 27, 1936	Vocalion 4630	1939	2:50
2.	"When You Got a Good Friend"	November 23, 1936	previously unreleased	1961	2:35
3.	"Ramblin' on My Mind"	November 23, 1936	unreleased alternate take	1961	2:49
4.	"Stones in My Passway"	June 19, 1937	Vocalion 3723	1937	2:25
5.	"Traveling Riverside Blues"	June 20, 1937	previously unreleased	1961	2:43
6.	"Milkcow's Calf Blues"	June 20, 1937	unreleased alternate take	1961	2:14
7.	"Me and the Devil Blues"	June 20, 1937	unreleased alternate take	1961	2:30
8.	"Hellhound on My Trail"	June 20, 1937	Vocalion 3623	1937	2:36

=== 1998 reissue bonus track ===
Track	Song Title	Recorded	Catalogue	Released	Time
17.	"Traveling Riverside Blues"	June 20, 1937	unreleased alternate take	1998	2:39
