= Walkin' Blues =

Traditional blues standard

"Walking Blues"

Song by Son House
- Released: 1985
- Recorded: Grafton, Wisconsin, May 28, 1930
- Genre: Blues
- Length: 2:54
- Songwriter: Son House

"Walkin' Blues" or "Walking Blues" is a blues standard written and recorded by American Delta blues musician Son House in 1930. Although unissued at the time, it was part of House's repertoire and other musicians, including Robert Johnson and Muddy Waters, adapted the song and recorded their own versions.

Besides "Walking Blues", Johnson's 1936 rendition incorporates melodic and rhythmic elements from House's "My Black Mama" (which House also used for his "Death Letter") and slide guitar techniques Johnson learned from House. In 1941, Waters recorded the song with some different lyrics as "Country Blues" in his first field recording session for Alan Lomax. It served as the basis for his first charting song, "(I Feel Like) Going Home", for Chess Records in 1948. He later recorded "Walkin' Blues" with lyrics closer to House's and Johnson's for his first single, released by Chess in 1950. Various musicians have recorded the song over the years, usually as an electric ensemble piece. The Grateful Dead performed the song 141 times over their 30 years of touring.

== Origins ==
Several songs with the title "Walking Blues" were recorded before 1930 but are not related to House's song. Also, the lyrics "woke up this morning feeling down to my shoes" and "I got the [epithet] blues" were used in early blues songs. Son House combined these to make the couplet he used for his 1930 Paramount Records recording session. Paramount made a test pressing, which was unissued and lost until 1985, that incorporated the couplet in the usual blues structure (with the first line repeated):

I woke up this morning, feeling round for my shoes
I got up this morning, feeling round for my shoes
You know by that, people, I must have got the walking blues

In 1941, House performed a different "Walking Blues" accompanied by Willie Brown, Fiddling Joe Martin, and Leroy Williams, recorded by Alan Lomax and John Work for the Library of Congress/Fisk University Mississippi Delta Collection. The session made a great impression on Lomax, which he attempted to describe many years later in The Land Where the Blues Began. No other verse of this song shares the walking theme, the melody is different, and the verse structure is very different (the whole couplet is repeated):

Well got up this morning, feeling 'round for my shoes
Know about that, I got the walkin' blues
I said I got up this morning, I was feeling 'round for my shoes
I said you know about that now, I got the walkin' blues

A year later, Lomax returned and recorded a solo song by House with the title "Walking Blues" which was different from both previous songs. It consisted of the sequence of verses House later called "Death Letter Blues". House had recorded this sequence at the Paramount session as part of "My Black Mama", the song which best displays the melody, structure, guitar figures and declamatory style that Johnson used on "Walking Blues".

== Johnson's song ==
=== Lyrics ===
Johnson follows a "morning" theme, similar to House's 1930 recording and uses House's first verse. Johnson's second verse may have been local or composed by either singer. It formed the basis of the song by their younger neighbor Muddy Waters, which was published by the Library of Congress as "Country Blues" and by Aristocrat Records as "I Feel Like Going Home". The third verse was in circulation and had been recorded by Mamie Smith in 1920 in "Fare Thee Honey".

As a male singer, Johnson could plausibly speak of the dangerous hobo practice of "riding the blinds" defined as "To cadge a lift by standing on the platform attached to the blind baggage car…a car that ain't got no door in the end that's next to the engine". The fourth verse is extremely common. The final verse, with reference to the widely advertised Elgin watch, was first used on record by Blind Lemon Jefferson in "Change My Luck Blues" in 1928.

=== Music ===
Edward Komara, comparing Johnson's "Walkin' Blues" with House's "My Black Mama", noted that Johnson's guitar accompaniment "retains many of House's features, including the thumbed strum on the lower strings, the fingerpicking on the treble strings, and in a later chorus the snapped beat during the IV chord. However, instead of the ascending bottleneck motif, he plays only an ornamental pitch on the top string." Komara also noted that Johnson accelerated the tempo, "building a momentum not present in House's original".

According to Elijah Wald,

Johnson's debt to House is clear in his vocal approach, which is stronger and rougher than on his more commercial sides. Nonetheless, his record's strengths are quite different, and it would be wrong to class it as an expert imitation. ... Given the advantage of good fidelity, his guitar sounds fuller and warmer than House's, and his vocals show more dynamic variation. He mixes a conversational flavor with the Delta growl, and adds some well-placed falsetto.

=== Releases ===
"Walkin' Blues" was not a commercial success when it was issued as a "race record" marketed to black listeners. Wald commented on this and other recordings in the style of Son House,

In the commercial music market of 1936, this was archaic, countrified material, and from a professional point of view it is a bit surprising that Johnson recorded any of it. This was the end of the session, though, and since he clearly enjoyed this sort of music, the producers may have figured that such songs were good enough for B-sides, and they might even sell a few extra records to some old folks.

However, these songs were received with great enthusiasm by a small group of white jazz record collectors and critics. Producer John Hammond chose "Walkin' Blues" and "Preachin' Blues" as the records to be played at his 1938 From Spirituals to Swing concert, when Johnson himself could not appear (Johnson had died a few months earlier). The 1961 Johnson compilation album King of the Delta Blues Singers was marketed to white enthusiasts. According to most sources, John Hammond was involved in the production and the selection of tracks. The album included the two House-style songs and a song with House-style guitar figures ("Cross Road Blues" and excluded songs in the commercial style of the late 1930s. Notable exclusions were Johnson's one commercial hit, "Terraplane Blues", and two songs which he passed on to the mainstream of blues recording, "Sweet Home Chicago" and "Dust My Broom".
