= Ramblin' on My Mind =

Single by Robert Johnson
- Released: May 1937
- Recorded: November 23, 1936
- Studio: Gunter Hotel, San Antonio, Texas
- Genre: Blues
- Length: 2:51
- Label: Vocalion, ARC
- Songwriter(s): Robert Johnson
- Producer(s): Don Law

"Ramblin' on My Mind" is a blues song recorded on November 23, 1936, by Delta blues musician Robert Johnson. He recorded two takes of the song, which were used for different pressings of the 78 rpm records issued by both the Vocalion and ARC record companies.

The song used the melody made popular by Walter Davis in his hit record "M & O Blues". Johnson composed two songs to this melody, "Ramblin' on My Mind" and "When You Got a Good Friend", with different musical approaches and different guitar tunings. For "Ramblin' on My Mind" he used an open tuning that allowed him to combine a boogie shuffle on the bass strings with bottleneck triplets on the treble strings. These slide triplets were the model for Elmore James's guitar accompaniment to "Dust My Broom".

Members of the family of Ike Zimmerman, who taught Johnson how to improve his guitar technique, have claimed that "Ramblin' on My Mind" was in fact written by him. They argue they had heard the song from Ike before he met Johnson.

== Eric Clapton recordings ==
The song was recorded by John Mayall & the Bluesbreakers with Eric Clapton for Blues Breakers with Eric Clapton (1966). It was Clapton's first solo vocal recording and in his autobiography he explained:

John [Mayall] insisted that I do vocals. This was much against my better judgment, since most of the guys I longed to emulate were older and had deep voices, and I felt extremely uncomfortable singing in my high-pitched whine.

Clapton later recorded versions that appear on Just One Night (1980), Crossroads 2: Live in the Seventies (1996), Sessions for Robert J (2004), and Live from Madison Square Garden (2009).
