= They're Red Hot =

Song recorded by Robert Johnson in 1937

- Original 78 record label

Single by Robert Johnson
- Released: July 1937
- Recorded: November 27, 1936
- Studio: Gunter Hotel, San Antonio, Texas, U.S.
- Genre: Blues, hokum
- Length: 2:58
- Label: Vocalion
- Songwriter: Robert Johnson
- Producer: Don Law

"They're Red Hot" is a song written and performed by Delta blues musician Robert Johnson. The song was recorded on November 27, 1936, in an improvised studio in Gunter Hotel, San Antonio, Texas. Vocalion Records issued it on a 78 rpm record, with "Come On in My Kitchen" as the second side, in 1937. The lyrics describe a woman selling hot tamales from a stall, with the aforementioned tamales being a popular food in the Mississippi Delta, which Johnson would likely have eaten many times.

Music historian Ted Gioia describes "They're Red Hot" as:

[one] of his best dance numbers ... evoking the pitches of street vendors, [a] look backward to the world of medicine shows and itinerant merchants ... This is the most lighthearted interlude in all of Johnson's oeuvre, opening up a different perspective on this supposedly devil-haunted soul.

== Red Hot Chili Peppers version ==
Red Hot Chili Peppers recorded the song for their 1991 album Blood Sugar Sex Magik. A reviewer in Far Out describes it as a "joke song":

It’s the same kind of offbeat and lascivious goofiness that made the Chili Peppers the Chili Peppers, and the fact that the band’s name is partially in the song title certainly helps solidify the connection. [It is] silly, simple, and a wonderfully wacky to end Blood Sugar Sex Magik.
