= 32-20 Blues =

- Original 78 record label

Single by Robert Johnson
- Released: April 1937
- Recorded: November 26, 1936
- Studio: Gunter Hotel, San Antonio, Texas, United States
- Genre: Blues
- Length: 2:49
- Label: Vocalion, ARC
- Songwriter: Robert Johnson
- Producer: Don Law

"32-20 Blues" is a blues song by Delta blues musician Robert Johnson. It was recorded during his second recording session in San Antonio, Texas, United States, on November 26, 1936. The title refers to .32-20 Winchester ammunition, which could be used in handguns as well as smaller rifles.

The song is based on the Skip James song "22-20 Blues". The song was released in April the following year on Vocalion Records as a 78 rpm record. It was included on the first reissue of Johnson's songs, King of the Delta Blues Singers in 1961. In 1990, it was released on compact disc as part of The Complete Recordings box set.

The song has been recorded by many artists, including Muddy Waters, the New York Dolls, Phil Manning, Bob Dylan, John Hammond Jr., Eric Clapton, Alexis Korner, Colin Hodgkinson (playing bass), Flamin' Groovies, Johnny Winter, Gov't Mule, Rory Block, the Peter Green Splinter Group, Keith Richards, Cowboy Junkies, Cassandra Wilson, Rusty Cage, Chain, and Peter Laughner.
