= Come On in My Kitchen =

- Original 78 record label

Single by Robert Johnson
- Released: July 1937
- Recorded: November 23, 1936
- Studio: Gunter Hotel, San Antonio, Texas
- Genre: Blues
- Length: 2:35
- Label: Vocalion
- Songwriter: Robert Johnson
- Producer: Don Law

"Come On in My Kitchen" is a blues song by Robert Johnson. Music writer Elijah Wald has described it as "a hypnotic lament" and "his first unquestionable masterpiece".

A sometime traveling companion and fellow musician, Johnny Shines, recalled that Johnson's performance of the song could be overpowering:

One time in St. Louis we were playing one of the songs that Robert would like to play with someone once in a great while, "Come On In My Kitchen". He was playing very slow and passionately, and when we had quit, I noticed no one was saying anything. Then I realised they were crying – both women and men.

== Background ==
Blues scholars have identified a body of previously recorded songs with direct and indirect melodic similarities. Edward Komara suggests a line of recordings with notably high degree of sales and of imitation by other artists: 1925's "How Long Daddy How Long" (Ida Cox with Papa Charlie Jackson); 1928's "How Long, How Long Blues" (Leroy Carr with Scrapper Blackwell); 1930's "Sitting on Top of the World: (Mississippi Sheiks); and 1934's "Six Feet in the Ground" (St. Louis Jimmy Oden). Former neighbours report that Johnson learned "How Long" from Carr's record in the year following its release.

Komara suggests that Johnson's thumbed bass lines in "Come On in My Kitchen" were directly inspired by Carr's piano in "How Long" and that part of humming and slide guitar playing copied the violin of Lonnie Chatman of the Sheiks on "Sitting on Top of the World". Elijah Wald suggests that Johnson's main inspiration was Tampa Red's 1934 "Things 'Bout Coming My Way". The structure of this melodic family is an eight bar blues with a couplet followed by a refrain. The repeated refrain gives textual unity to the song, and generally sets an emotional tone to which the couplet verses conform.

== Lyrics ==
In his two takes, Johnson created two texts based on the refrain and on a consistent emotional projection. In both, his opening verse is a wordless hum, and his central verse is the spoken address to his woman "Can't you hear that wind howl" as his guitar imitates the sound of winter wind. Only two sung verses are common to both takes. One describes the isolation of the woman: "Everybody throws her down". The other establishes the regretful retrospective mood of the singer:

The woman I love, took from my best friend
Some joker got lucky, stole her back again

This verse had been used by Skip James in "Devil Got My Woman." Some critics believe that Johnson copied the verse either directly from James or indirectly through Johnny Temple In the song, his woman "is up the country, won't write to me". Johnson says he "went up the mountain" only to see that "another man got my woman". He is an orphan: "Ain't got nobody to care for me." The woman won't come back: "I've taken the last nickel, out of her nation sack." In one interpretation, the nation sack would have contained nine silver coins as a love spell. In the other verse, winter is coming but "That's dry long so."

== Recording and releases ==
Johnson recorded the song on November 23, 1936, at the Gunter Hotel in San Antonio, Texas – his first recording session. Two takes were preserved. Vocalion Records issued the second take in 1937; Columbia Records chose the first for Johnson's first compilation King of the Delta Blues Singers (1961). Wald believes that the Vocalion producers considered the first take to be too mournful and uncommercial, and told Johnson to sing a more upbeat variant for the second take. Wald feels that the inferior take was the one actually issued in 1937.
