= Hellhound on My Trail =

"Hell Hound on My Trail"
- Original 78 record label

Single by Robert Johnson
- Released: September 1937
- Recorded: Dallas, Texas, June 20, 1937
- Genre: Blues
- Length: 2:35
- Label: Vocalion
- Songwriter: Robert Johnson

"Hellhound on My Trail" (originally "Hell Hound on My Trail") is a blues song recorded by Mississippi Delta bluesman Robert Johnson in June 1937 and released as a 78 rpm single on Vocalion Records that September. It was inspired by earlier blues songs and blues historian Ted Gioia describes it as one of Johnson's "best known and most admired performances—many would say it is his greatest".

== Background ==
Prior to Johnson's recording, the phrase "hellhound on my trail" had been used in various blues songs. Sylvester Weaver's "Devil Blues", recorded in 1927 contains: "Hellhounds start to chase me man, I was a running fool, My ankles caught on fire, couldn't keep my puppies cool" and "Funny Paper" Smith in his 1931 "Howling Wolf Blues No. 3" sang: "I take time when I'm prowlin', an' wipe my tracks out with my tail ... Get home and get blue an' start howlin', an' the hellhound on my trail". The Biddleville Quintette's 1926 religious recording "Show Pity Lord" opens with a religious testimony declaring that "The hell hound has turned back off my trail".

Blues writers, such as Elijah Wald, see Johnson following Johnny Temple (1935 "The Evil Devil Blues") and Kansas Joe McCoy (1934 "Evil Devil Woman Blues") in adapting Skip James's 1931 song "Devil Got My Woman". The emotional intensity, guitar tuning and strained singing style of "Hell Hound on My Trail" are also found in James' performance.

In the 1980s, however, another James record "Yola My Blues Away" (1931) became widely available on reissue recordings. "Devil Got My Woman" shares the tuning and vocal styles that Johnson displayed, but the "Hellhound" melody is closer to "Yola" than to "Devil". From the latter, Johnson took the device of repeating the end of lines with an attached musical phrase. Additionally, he used the lyrics of one of the verses from "Come On In My Kitchen". Blues historian Edward Komara concluded "It is probable that Johnny Temple used the "Devil" attachment phrases and lyrics while teaching "Yola" to Johnson".

== Composition and lyrics ==
"Hell Hound on My Trail" is a solo performance by Johnson with vocal and slide guitar. He uses an open E minor guitar tuning, with the lower strings providing a droning accompaniment; Charles Shaar Murray describes "the bottleneck ... mak[ing] the treble strings of his guitar moan like wind through dead trees".

Gioia notes that the lyrics "[deal] with the familiar blues theme of the rambling musician, but now the trip takes on darker tones, the traveler is pursued". Music historian Samuel Charters considers the first and last verses possibly the finest in all of the blues. The vision of hellhounds coming to catch sinners was prevalent in Southern churches at that time, and Charters feels this may have been the image in Johnson's mind:

I got to keep movin', I've got to keep movin', blues fallin' down like hail, blues fallin' down like hail
Umm-mm-mm-mm, blues fallin' down like hail, blues fallin' down like hail
And the day keeps on worrin' me, there's a hellhound on my trail, hellhound on my trail, hellhound on my trail

Texas Tech University professor of African American history Karlos K. Hill, writing for the University of Mississippi journal Study the South, speculates that "Hellhound on My Trail" may concern Johnson's fear of lynching, with the titular "hellhound" referring to bloodhounds used to track down fugitives sought by a lynch mob; Johnson's stepfather, Charles Dodds, was forced to change his name and flee the Mississippi Delta for Memphis, Tennessee, after a white mob threatened to lynch him.

Johnson recorded the song during his last recording session in Dallas, Texas, on June 20, 1937. It was the first song he recorded that day, and the first single to be released from that session.

== Recognition and influence ==
The critic Rudi Blesh, in his 1946 book Shining Trumpets: a History of Jazz, reviewed Johnson's recording, stating: "With all its strangeness, 'Hell Hound' is not only an authentic blues, but a remarkable variation in which the standard harmony is altered in a personal and creative way to permit the expression of uncanny and weird feelings. Johnson's strident voice sounds possessed like that of a man cast in a spell and his articulation, like speech in possession, is difficult to understand...". In his 1992 book Searching for Robert Johnson, Peter Guralnick described the recording as "Johnson's crowning achievement and one that is almost universally recognised as the apogee of the blues...". According to Hill, "Hellhound on My Trail" is "noted as one of blues music’s most terrifying songs, as well as a cornerstone of early blues music."

In 1983, Robert Johnson's "Hell Hound on My Trail" was inducted into the Blues Foundation Hall of Fame as a "Classic of Blues Recording". Writing for the Foundation, Jim O'Neal described it as "among the deepest and darkest of Robert Johnson's legendary blues masterworks." The song is listed as one of NPR's "100 most important American musical works of the 20th century".
