= Travelling Riverside Blues =

1961 song by Robert Johnson

Song by Robert Johnson

from the album King of the Delta Blues Singers
- Released: 1961
- Recorded: Dallas, Texas, June 20, 1937
- Genre: Blues
- Length: 2:47
- Label: Columbia
- Songwriter: Robert Johnson
- Producer: Don Law

"Travelling Riverside Blues" is a blues song written by the bluesman Robert Johnson. He recorded it on June 20, 1937, in Dallas, Texas, during his last recording session. The song was unreleased until its inclusion on the 1961 Johnson compilation album King of the Delta Blues Singers.

== Robert Johnson original version ==
Johnson's song has a typical twelve-bar blues structure (though as is common in downhome blues of this era, the length of each verse is in fact thirteen and a half bars of 4/4), played on a single guitar tuned to open G, with a slide. An alternate version was recorded the same day (and was considered lost) but was finally released officially on the 1998 reissue of King of the Delta Blues Singers.

== Lyrics ==
The song is well known for the lyric "Now you can squeeze my lemon 'til the juice run down my leg". It is likely that Johnson had taken this himself from a song recorded earlier that same year (1937) called "She Squeezed My Lemon", by Roosevelt Sykes.

== Led Zeppelin version ==
"Travelling Riverside Blues"

Promotional single by Led Zeppelin

from the album Led Zeppelin Boxed Set
- Released: October 8, 1990
- Recorded: June 23, 1969
- Studio: BBC, London
- Genre: Blues rock
- Length: 5:11
- Label: Atlantic
- Songwriters: Robert Johnson; Jimmy Page; Robert Plant
- Producer: John Walters

Led Zeppelin singles chronology
"Fool in the Rain" (1979)	"Travelling Riverside Blues" (1990)	"Baby Come On Home" (1993)

English rock band Led Zeppelin's version of this song was produced by John Walters at the BBC studios in Aeolian Hall on June 23, 1969 during the band's UK Tour of Summer 1969. Jimmy Page dubbed extra guitar parts onto the track (the main track being played on a 12-string electric guitar) and it was broadcast four days later on John Peel's Top Gear show under the title "Travelling Riverside Blues '69", and repeated on January 11, 1970. Page used an acoustic slide guitar for the entire song, while Bonham played triplets on the bass drum.

It was interest from US radio interviewers and fans during Page's Outrider tour that originally led him to negotiate with BBC Enterprises for the song's release. A promotional video clip was also released in 1990, with out-take footage from the band's 1976 concert film, The Song Remains the Same inter-spliced with other footage from the band's archive. The clip also features a railroad montage, and underwater shots of the Mississippi River. The song reached number seven on the Billboard Top Rock Tracks Top 50 chart in November 1990, culled from national album rock radio airplay reports. In Canada, it reached number 57 on the RPM Top 100 Chart.

== See also ==
- List of Led Zeppelin songs written or inspired by others
