= Sweet Home Chicago =

Blues standard first recorded by Robert Johnson

- Original 78 record label

Single by Robert Johnson
- Released: August 1937
- Recorded: November 23, 1936
- Studio: Gunter Hotel, San Antonio, Texas
- Genre: Blues
- Length: 2:59
- Label: Vocalion
- Songwriter: Robert Johnson
- Producer: Don Law

"Sweet Home Chicago" is a blues standard first recorded by Robert Johnson in 1936. While often credited to Johnson, the song has precedents in several earlier blues songs. It has become a popular anthem for the city of Chicago, despite ambiguity in Johnson's original lyrics. Numerous artists have interpreted the song in a variety of styles.

== Earlier songs ==
The melody of "Sweet Home Chicago" can be found in several blues songs, including "Honey Dripper Blues," "Red Cross Blues," and "Kokomo Blues," which served as the immediate model. The lyrics for "Honey Dripper Blues No. 2" by Edith North Johnson follow a typical AAB structure:

Oh my days are so long, babe
You know my nights are lonesome too (2×)
I can't find my honey dripper, Lord, I don't know what to do

Lucille Bogan (as Bessie Jackson) used an AB plus refrain structure in "Red Cross Man":

If anybody don't believe I've got a Red Cross man
Go out in my back yard to get my Red Cross can
Oh, baby don't don't you want to go, go with me and my man down to the Red Cross Store

Blues historian Elijah Wald suggests that Scrapper Blackwell was the first to reference a specific city in his "Kokomo Blues," using an AAB verse:

Mmmm, baby don't you want to go (2×)
Pack up your little suitcase, Papa's going to Kokomo

"Kokola Blues," recorded by Madlyn Davis in 1927, also references Kokomo, Indiana, in the refrain:

And it's hey, hey baby, baby don't you want to go
Back to that eleven light city, back to sweet Kokomo

In 1932, Jabo Williams recorded "Ko Ko Mo Blues," retaining the same refrain but adding a counting line: "One and two is three, four and five and six." James Arnold claimed the song in 1933, styling himself Kokomo Arnold and naming his version "Old Original Kokomo Blues." He later explained that the song's reference to "eleven light city" referred to a Chicago drugstore where a girlfriend worked, and "Koko" was their brand of coffee. Papa Charlie McCoy (using the name "the Mississippi Mudder") changed the reference to Baltimore, Maryland, in "Baltimore Blues." This city had more name recognition among the Southern blues audience than Kokomo, Indiana.

== Johnson's adaptation ==
Robert Johnson recorded "Sweet Home Chicago" on November 23, 1936, in San Antonio, Texas. He transformed the song into one of aspirational migration, replacing "back to Kokomo" with "to Chicago" and substituting for "that eleven light city" another migration goal, "that land of California."

But I'm cryin' hey baby, Honey don't you want to go
Back to the land of California, to my sweet home Chicago

Johnson sang this as the first verse and used it as the refrain. Otherwise, his verses maintained the structure of Arnold's recording, including similar counting verses. Johnson successfully evoked an exotic, modern place far from the South, an amalgam of popular destinations for African Americans migrating northward and westward. For later singers, this ambiguous location proved more appealing than the less-known Kokomo. Tommy McClennan's "Baby Don't You Want To Go" (1939) and Walter Davis's "Don't You Want To Go" (1941) were both based on Johnson's chorus. Subsequent singers often used Johnson's chorus while omitting the numerical verses.

Johnson employed a driving guitar rhythm and a high, near-falsetto vocal style. His guitar accompaniment did not use Kokomo Arnold's bottleneck guitar style. Instead, he adapted the boogie piano accompaniments of Roosevelt Sykes on "Honey Dripper" and Walter Roland on "Red Cross" to the guitar. Leroy Carr's "Baby Don't You Love Me No More" (featuring Leroy Carr on piano and Scrapper Blackwell on guitar) shares a similar rhythmic approach and feel to Johnson's initial two verses.

== Lyric interpretation ==
The lyrics refer only obliquely to Chicago itself, primarily in the song's refrain, where the narrator pleads for a woman to go with him "to that land of California, to my sweet home Chicago." California is mentioned more frequently than Chicago, appearing in the refrain and in one of the stanzas ("I'm goin' to California/ from there to Des Moines, Iowa"). These perplexing lyrics have long been a source of discussion. In the 1960s and 1970s, some commentators speculated this was a geographical mistake by Johnson. However, Johnson was a sophisticated songwriter and used geographical references in several of his songs.

One interpretation posits that Johnson envisioned the song as a metaphorical description of an imagined paradise, combining elements of the North and West, distant from the racism and poverty of the 1936 Mississippi Delta. Like Chicago, California was a common destination referenced in many Great Depression-era songs, books, and movies. Music writer Max Haymes argues that Johnson's intention was "the land of California or that sweet home Chicago." Another theory suggests it refers to Chicago's California Avenue, a thoroughfare that predates Johnson's recording and runs from the far south to the far north side of the city.

A more nuanced and humorous interpretation suggests the narrator is pressuring a woman to leave town with him for Chicago, but his blatant geographic ignorance reveals an attempt at deceit. Another explanation is that Johnson was depicting a cross-country trip, as mentioned in the line, "I'm going to California/from there to Des Moines, Iowa," with Chicago, Illinois (a state bordering Iowa), as the final destination. Writer Alan Greenberg notes that Johnson had a distant relative who lived in Port Chicago, California, which could add ambiguity to which Chicago is referenced. Finally, using the same tune, Sam Montgomery sang of a land "where the sweet old oranges grow" in a song by that name. It is unclear whether the reference to oranges (a California cash crop) corrected Johnson's geographical confusion or reflected an earlier song that Johnson modified.

As the song evolved into a homage to Chicago, the original lyrics referencing California were altered in most subsequent renditions. The line "back to the land of California" is typically changed to "back to the same old place," and "I'm going to California" becomes "I'm going back to Chicago." This altered version is attributed to pianist Roosevelt Sykes.

== Legacy ==
External videos
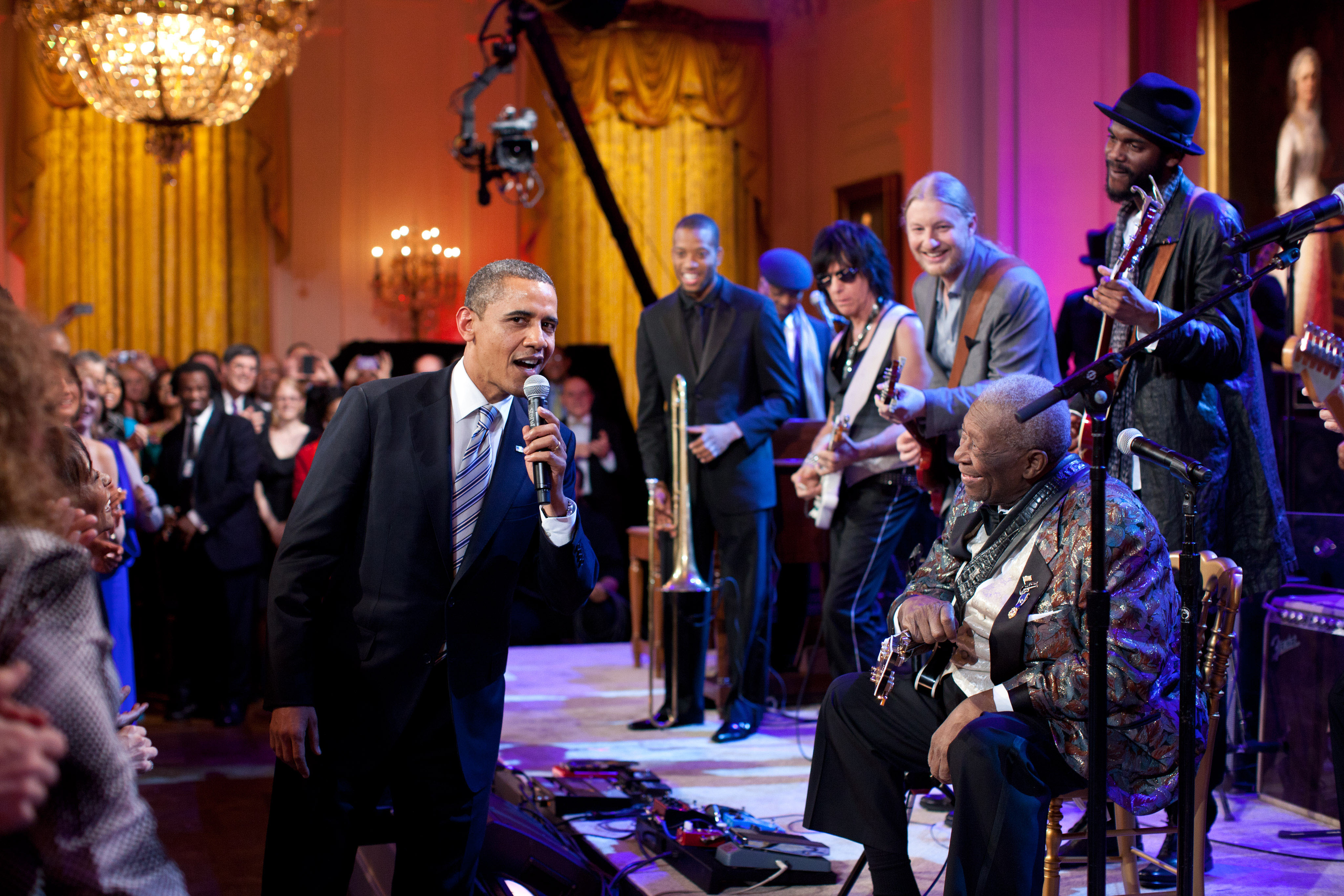
- Buddy Guy & Ensemble: "Sweet Home Chicago", joined by B.B. King and Barack Obama at the White House

"Sweet Home Chicago" is a popular blues standard performed and recorded by numerous professional and semi-professional musicians in various styles. Steve LaVere, manager of Johnson's recording legacy, commented, "It's like 'When the Saints Go Marching In' to the blues crowd."

In 1958, Junior Parker recorded the song as an upbeat ensemble shuffle with harmonica accompaniment. Duke Records released it as a single, which reached number 13 on the Billboard R&B chart. Duke included a songwriting credit for Roosevelt Sykes, who had recorded the song as "Sweet Old Chicago" in 1955. Neither Sykes nor Parker included a reference to California, a practice followed by many subsequent performers.

In 1967, Chicago blues musician Magic Sam recorded a version for his influential album West Side Soul. In an album review, Stephen Thomas Erlewine commented:

He [Magic Sam] not only makes "Sweet Home Chicago" his own (no version before or since is as definitive as this), he creates the soul-injected, high-voltage modern blues sound that everybody has emulated and nobody has topped in the years since.

The Blues Brothers, the group fronted by comedians Dan Aykroyd and John Belushi, performed the song in the climactic concert scene of the 1980 film The Blues Brothers. In the intro, Belushi's character dedicates the song "to the late great Magic Sam."

On February 21, 2012, Barack Obama and Michelle Obama hosted "In Performance at the White House: Red, White and Blues," a celebration of blues music held in the East Room of the White House. President Obama began by describing the origins of blues in the South, adding, "The music migrated north – from Mississippi Delta to Memphis to my hometown in Chicago." Later, encouraged by Buddy Guy and B.B. King, he joined in singing the first verse of "Sweet Home Chicago."

In 2014, Robert Johnson's 1936 recording was inducted into the Grammy Hall of Fame.
