= Gunter Hotel =

- U.S. National Register of Historic Places
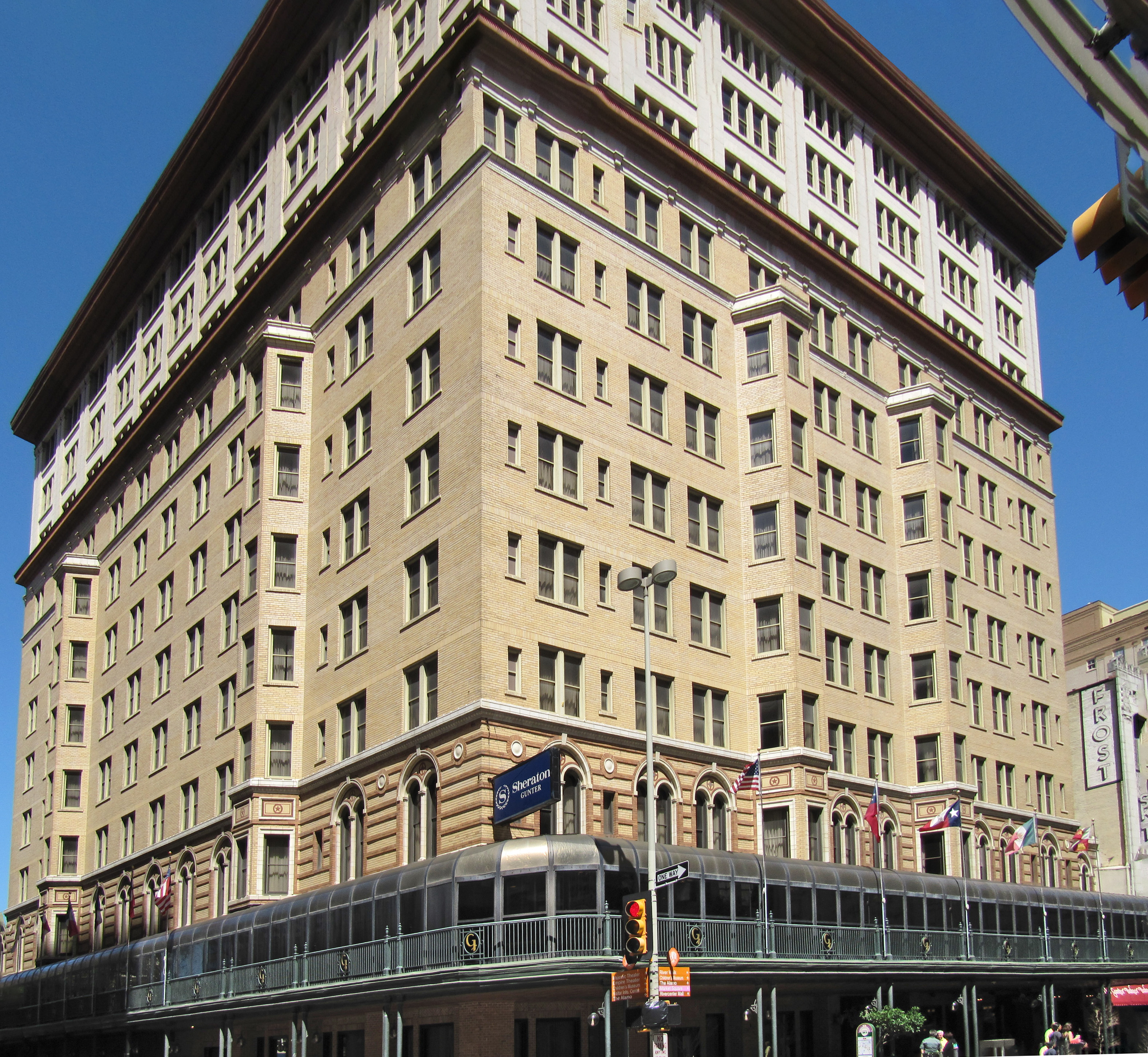
- The Gunter Hotel

- Location within Texas Location within the United States
- Location: 205 E. Houston St., San Antonio, Texas, US
- Coordinates: 29°25′42″N 98°29′28″W
- Area: 1.2 acres (0.49 ha)
- Built: 1909; 117 years ago
- Built by: Westlake Construction Company
- Architect: Mauran, Russell & Garden (1909); Herbert M. Greene (1926)
- Architectural style: Skyscraper
- NRHP reference No.: 06001233
- Added to NRHP: January 9, 2007; 19 years ago

The Gunter Hotel is a historic hotel in Downtown San Antonio, Texas, United states, built in 1909 and designed by St. Louis architect John Mauran. It is listed on the National Register of Historic Places.

== History ==
The Gunter Hotel opened on November 20, 1909, on the site of the earlier Mahncke Hotel. There had been a hotel or inn on the same site since 1837. The eight-story, 301-room hotel was built by the San Antonio Hotel Company and named for Jot Gunter, a local rancher and real estate developer who was one of its financiers. It was designed by Ernest John Russell, of the St. Louis firm Mauran, Russell & Garden. It was the largest building in San Antonio at the time.

The Baker Hotel Company purchased the hotel in 1924 and expanded it in 1926 with the addition of three stories. The addition was designed by architect Herbert M. Greene.

It was restored from 1980-1985, overseen by architect Robert V. Buck. At the same time, a two-story parking garage was added adjacent to the hotel, designed by Gustav Heye. It was renamed the Radisson Gunter Hotel in April 1986 and then the Sheraton Gunter Hotel in 1989. It was sold to the Camberley Group in 1996, becoming The Camberley Gunter. It was sold to Houston Street Hotel Partners in 1999 and became, again, the Sheraton Gunter Hotel. In June 2023, it was renamed The Gunter Hotel, though still managed by Marriott. It was renovated in 2025 at a cost of $57 million. In June 2026, it joined Marriott's Tribute Portfolio division as The Gunter Hotel, a Tribute Portfolio Hotel.

The insurance company United Services Automobile Association was formed based on a meeting of twenty five United States Army Officers on June 20, 1922 at the Gunter Hotel to discuss the procurement of reliable and economical auto insurance.

=== Military use ===
The Vance House hotel, now the site of the Gunter Hotel, became the administrative offices for the U.S. Army during the Mexican–American War from 1846-1847 as the Headquarters for Texas military affairs. At this site, General David E. Twiggs surrendered $1,600,000 in federal property to the forces of Confederate Texas. The Gunter Hotel was also the site of the headquarters of Brevet Colonel Robert E. Lee who assumed command of the Post of San Antonio on August 5, 1857.

== In popular culture ==
On November 27, 1936, Room 414 of the Gunter was the scene of a historic recording session by blues artist Robert Johnson. Talent scout H. C. Speir had arranged the session with Brunswick Records who set up a temporary studio in the hotel where Johnson recorded a number of songs including the blues classic "Sweet Home Chicago".

In 2009, John Mellencamp came to the Gunter to record the track "Right Behind Me" for his album No Better Than This, in the same room where Johnson had recorded in 1936.

In 2016 American singer songwriter Joe Henry and British singer-songwriter Billy Bragg recorded a record in room 414 for their Shine a Light collaboration.
