= Don Law =

English-American record producer and music executive (1902–1982)

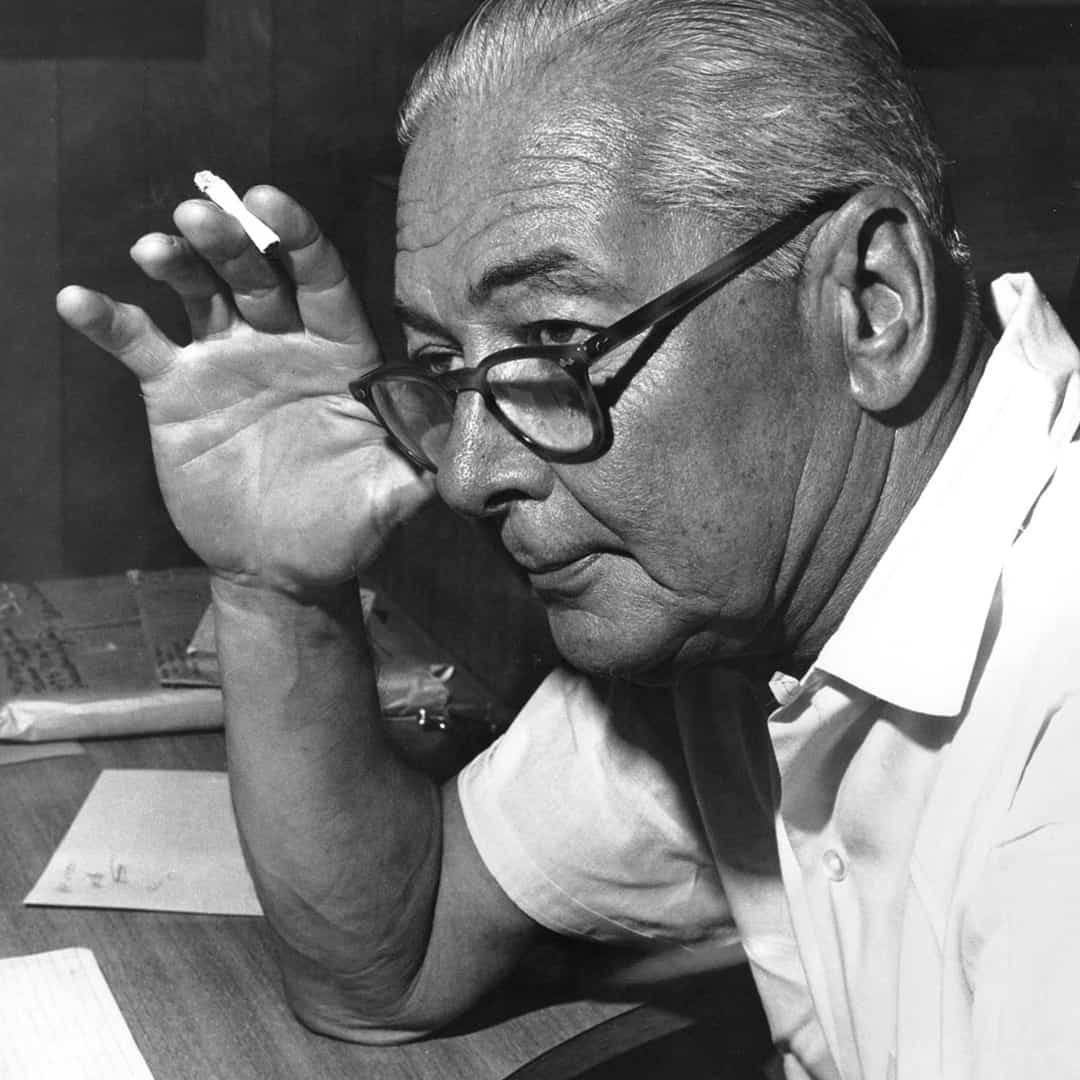

Background information
- Born: Donald Firth Law; February 24, 1902; Leytonstone, London, England
- Died: December 20, 1982 (aged 80) La Marque, Texas, U.S.
- Occupations: Record producer, A&R
- Years active: c.1930–1970s
- Labels: Brunswick, Columbia

Donald Firth Law (February 24, 1902 – December 20, 1982) was an English-American record producer and music business executive. He produced Robert Johnson's only recordings, and as head of Columbia Records' country music division later worked with many leading country musicians including Bob Wills, Carl Smith, Flatt and Scruggs, Lefty Frizzell, Ray Price, Johnny Horton, Marty Robbins and Johnny Cash.

== Life and career ==
Don Law was born in Leytonstone, London, the son of Frederick Law and his wife Marion (née Ludbrook). As a young man he sang with the London Choral Society, before emigrating to the US in 1924. After farming in Alabama, he started work in Dallas, Texas as a bookkeeper for Brunswick Records, until that company was taken over by the American Record Corporation in 1931. He worked closely with ARC executive Art Satherley (who had also been born in England), and increasingly worked in A&R, discovering new talent to record. In 1936, a regional talent scout, Ernie Oertle, introduced Law and Satherley to blues musician Robert Johnson. Law recorded Johnson in San Antonio and Dallas in 1936 and 1937, at the only two sessions that the musician ever recorded. The following year, 1938, Law recorded country musician Bob Wills on the song "San Antonio Rose", which became his signature song.

After ARC was taken over by Columbia Records, Law moved to New York City to take charge of the company's recordings for children. However, he soon returned to country music, and in 1945 took charge of all Columbia's recordings east of Texas, with Satherley taking responsibility for those to the west. After Satherley's retirement in 1952, Law took over national responsibility for Columbia's country music division, initially recording mainly at Jim Beck's studio in Dallas. He recruited singers Carl Smith, Lefty Frizzell, Little Jimmy Dickens, Johnny Horton, Marty Robbins and Johnny Cash, to the label, and, after Beck's death in 1956, recorded mainly at Bradley Studios Studio B (the Quonset hut studio) in Nashville, which later became Columbia's Studio B. Law's productions in the late 1950s and early 1960s included Johnny Horton's "The Battle of New Orleans", Marty Robbins' "El Paso", and Jimmy Dean's "Big Bad John", all of which topped the US pop chart and helped bring country music to a wider audience. He also produced most of Johnny Cash's recordings during the period. According to Law's induction notice at the Country Music Hall of Fame, "along with Chet Atkins at RCA, Owen Bradley at Decca, and Ken Nelson at Capitol, Law was instrumental in re-establishing country's commercial viability during the so-called Nashville Sound era" from about 1957.

Law took mandatory retirement from Columbia Records in 1967, but set up an independent production company, Don Law Productions, and continued to have some success with singers including Henson Cargill. In 1970, Law produced the double platinum album For The Good Times by Ray Price. Law retired completely in the late 1970s. He died from lung cancer in 1982 in La Marque, Galveston, Texas, at the age of 80. He was posthumously inducted into the Country Music Hall of Fame in 2001.

A son, Don Law Jr., became a music promoter in the Boston area, selling his company to SFX Entertainment in 1998 for $80 million.

== In popular culture ==
The season 2 episode 6 of the NBC series Timeless, "King of The Delta Blues", features Don Law, who is portrayed by Gavin Stenhouse.
