= Constantine Samuel Rafinesque =

French polymath and naturalist (1783–1840)

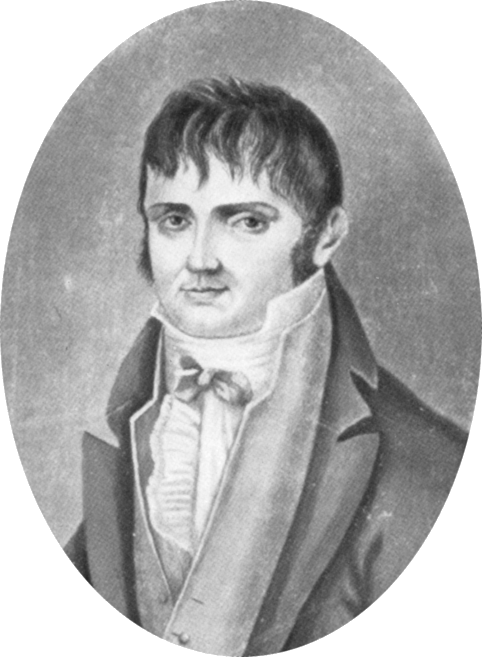
- Born: Constantine Samuel Rafinesque-Schmaltz; 22 October 1783; Galata, Constantinople, Ottoman Empire
- Died: 18 September 1840 (aged 56); Philadelphia, Pennsylvania, U.S.
- Scientific career
- Fields: Anthropology, botany, zoology, geology, linguistics
- Author abbrev. (botany): Raf.
- Author abbrev. (zoology): Rafinesque

Constantine Samuel Rafinesque-Schmaltz (French pronunciation: [kɔ̃stɑ̃tin(ə) samɥɛl ʁafinɛsk(ə)ʃmalts]) (22 October 1783 – 18 September 1840) was a French polymath of the early 19th century. Born near Constantinople in the Ottoman Empire, he was self-educated in France.

As a young man, Rafinesque-Schmaltz traveled to the United States, eventually settling in Ohio in 1815. There, he made significant contributions to botany, zoology, and the study of prehistoric earthworks in North America. Beyond his previous extensive work in Europe, he also contributed to the study of ancient Mesoamerican linguistics. In 1836, Rafinesque was the first person to use the term Taíno as a way of referring to the Indigenous peoples of the Greater Antilles.

Rafinesque had a reputation as an eccentric and erratic genius. He was an autodidact who excelled in various fields of knowledge, as a zoologist, botanist, writer and polyglot. He wrote prolifically on such diverse topics as anthropology, biology, geology, and linguistics, but was honored in none of these fields during his lifetime. An outcast in the American scientific community, his submissions were automatically rejected by leading journals. Among his theories were that ancestors of Native Americans had migrated by the Bering Sea from Asia to North America, and that the Americas were populated by black indigenous peoples at the time of European contact.

The standard author abbreviation Raf. is used to indicate this person as the author when citing a botanical name.

== Biography ==
Rafinesque was born on 22 October 1783, in Galata, a suburb of Constantinople. His father, F. G. Rafinesque, was a French merchant from Marseille; his mother, M. Schmaltz, was of German descent and born in Constantinople. His father died in Philadelphia about 1793. Rafinesque spent his youth in Marseille, and was mostly self-educated; he never attended university. By the age of 12, he had begun collecting plants for an herbarium. By 14, he had taught himself Greek and Latin because he needed to follow footnotes in the books he was reading in his paternal grandmother's libraries. In 1802, at the age of 19, Rafinesque sailed to Philadelphia in the United States with his younger brother. They traveled through Pennsylvania and Delaware, where he made the acquaintance of most of the young nation's few botanists.

In 1805, Rafinesque returned to Europe with his collection of botanical specimens, and settled in Palermo, Sicily, where he learned Italian. He became so successful in trade that he retired by age 25 and devoted his time entirely to natural history. For a time Rafinesque also worked as secretary to the American consul. During his stay in Sicily, he studied plants and fishes, naming many newly discovered species of each. He was elected a Fellow of the American Academy of Arts and Sciences in 1808.

=== Career in the United States ===
Rafinesque had a common-law wife. After their son died in 1815, he left her and returned to the United States. When his ship Union foundered near the coast of Connecticut, he lost all his books (50 boxes) and all his specimens (including more than 60,000 shells). Settling in New York, Rafinesque became a founding member of the newly established Lyceum of Natural History. In 1817, his book Florula Ludoviciana or A Flora of the State of Louisiana was strongly criticized by fellow botanists, which caused his writings to be ignored. By 1818, he had collected and named more than 250 new species of plants and animals. Slowly, he was rebuilding his collection of objects from nature.

In the summer of 1818, in Henderson, Kentucky, Rafinesque made the acquaintance of fellow naturalist John James Audubon, and stayed in Audubon's home for some three weeks. Audubon, although enjoying Rafinesque's company, took revenge upon him (for an incident where Rafinesque damaged one of Audubon's prized violins) by describing fantastic, made-up species, prompting Rafinesque to publish descriptions of them.

In 1819, Rafinesque became professor of botany at Transylvania University in Lexington, Kentucky, where he also gave private lessons in French, Italian, and Spanish. He was loosely associated with John D. Clifford, a merchant who was also interested in the ancient earthworks that remained throughout the Ohio Valley. Clifford conducted archival research, seeking the origins of these mounds, and Rafinesque measured and mapped them. Some had already been lost to American development.

He was elected a member of the American Antiquarian Society in 1820.

Rafinesque started recording all the new species of plants and animals he encountered in travels throughout the state. He was considered an erratic student of higher plants. In the spring of 1826, he left the university after quarreling with its president.

He traveled and lectured in various places, and endeavored to establish a magazine and a botanic garden, but without success. He moved to Philadelphia, a center of publishing and research, without employment. He published The Atlantic Journal and Friend of Knowledge, a Cyclopædic Journal and Review, of which only eight issues were printed (1832–1833). He also gave public lectures and continued publishing, mostly at his own expense.

=== Death ===
Rafinesque died of stomach and liver cancer in Philadelphia on 18 September 1840. The cancer may have been induced by Rafinesque's self-medication years before with a mixture containing maidenhair fern. He was buried in a plot in what is now Ronaldson's Cemetery. In March 1924, what were thought to be his remains were transported to Transylvania University and reinterred in a tomb under a stone inscribed, "Honor to whom honor is overdue."

== Work ==
=== Biology ===
Rafinesque published 6,700 binomial names of plants, many of which have priority over more familiar names. The quantity of new taxa he produced, both plants and animals, has made Rafinesque memorable or even notorious among biologists.

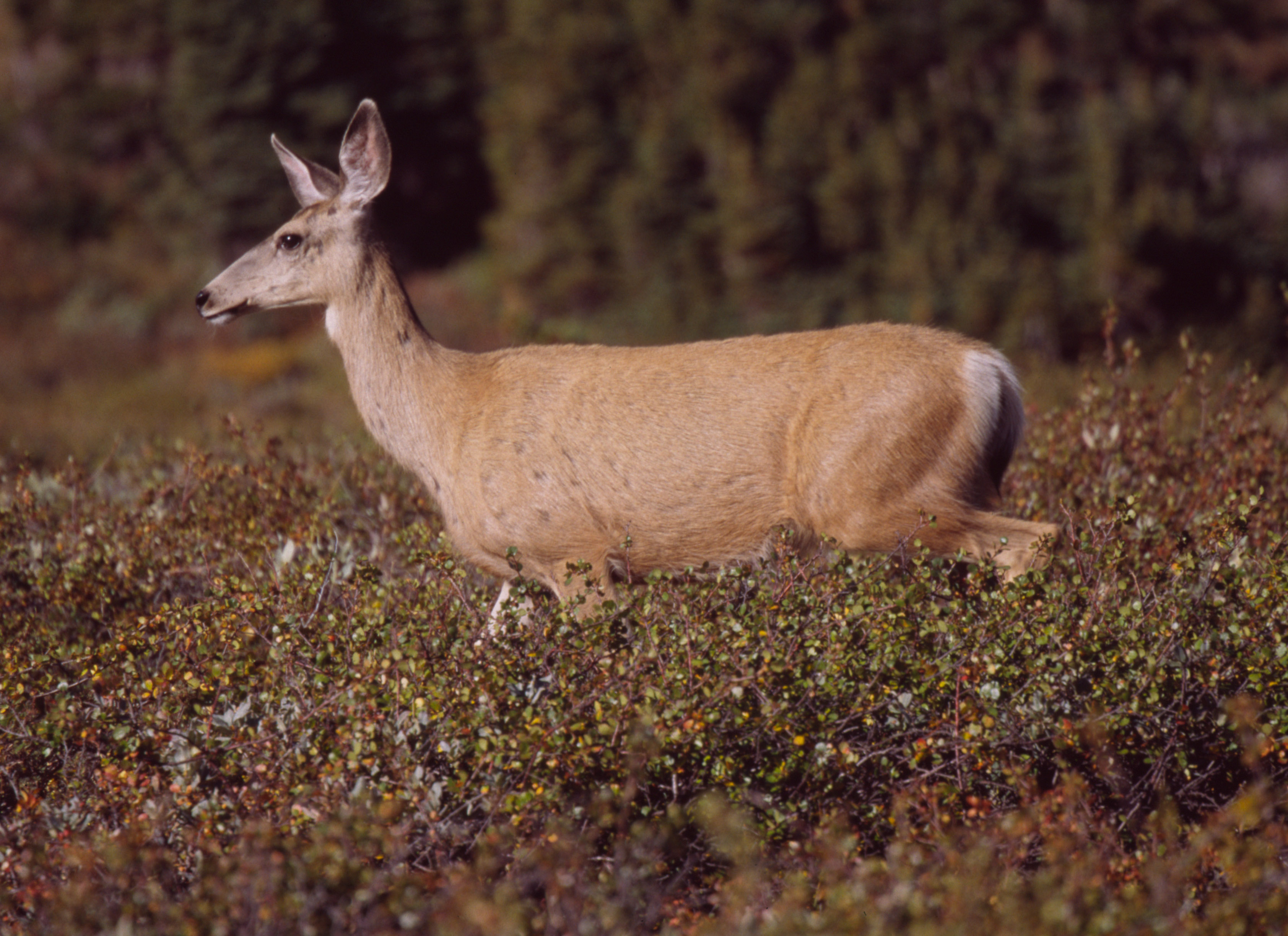
The mule deer is one of many species first named by Rafinesque.

Rafinesque applied to join one of the western scientific expeditions organized by President Thomas Jefferson, but received notice of appointment to the Dunbar and Hunter Expedition only after his arrival in Sicily. After studying the specimens collected by the Lewis and Clark expedition, he assigned scientific names to the black-tailed prairie dog (Cynomys ludovicianus), the white-footed mouse (Peromyscus leucopus), and the mule deer (Odocoileus hemionus).

=== Evolution ===
Rafinesque was one of the first to use the term "evolution" in the context of biological speciation.

Rafinesque proposed a theory of evolution before Charles Darwin. In a letter in 1832, Rafinesque wrote:

The truth is that Species and perhaps Genera also, are forming in organized beings by gradual deviations of shapes, forms and organs, taking place in the lapse of time. There is a tendency to deviations and mutations through plants and animals by gradual steps at remote irregular periods. This is a part of the great universal law of perpetual mutability in everything. Thus it is needless to dispute and differ about new genera, species and varieties. Every variety is a deviation which becomes a species as soon as it is permanent by reproduction. Deviations in essential organs may thus gradually become new genera.

In the third edition of On the Origin of Species published in 1861, Charles Darwin added a Historical Sketch that acknowledged the ideas of Rafinesque.

Rafinesque's evolutionary theory appears in a two-page article in the 1833 spring issue of the Atlantic Journal and Friend of Knowledge (a journal founded by himself). Rafinesque held that species are not fixed; they gradually change through time. He used the term "mutations". He believed that evolution had occurred "by gradual steps at remote irregular periods." This has been compared to the concept of punctuated equilibrium. He also held that the same processes apply to humans.

=== Walam Olum ===
In 1836, Rafinesque published his first volume of The American Nations. This included Walam Olum, a purported migration and creation narrative of the Lenape (also known by English speakers as the Delaware Indians). It told of their migration to the lands around the Delaware River. Rafinesque claimed he had obtained wooden tablets engraved and painted with Indigenous pictographs, together with a transcription in the Lenape language. Based on this, he produced an English translation of the tablets' contents. Rafinesque claimed the original tablets and transcription were later lost, leaving his notes and transcribed copy as the only record of evidence.

For over a century after Rafinesque's publication, the Walam Olum was widely accepted by ethnohistorians as authentically Native American in origin, but as early as 1849, when the document was republished by Ephraim G. Squier, Henry Rowe Schoolcraft, an ethnologist who had worked extensively in Michigan and related territories, wrote to Squier saying that he believed the document might be fraudulent. In the 1950s, the Indiana Historical Society published a "retranslation" of the Walam Olum, as "a worthy subject for students of aboriginal culture".

Since the late 20th century, studies especially in linguistic, ethnohistorical, archaeological, and textual analyses suggest that the Walam Olum account was largely or entirely a fabrication. Scholars have described its record of "authentic Lenape traditional migration stories" as spurious. After the publication in 1995 of David Oestreicher's thesis, The Anatomy of the Walam Olum: A 19th Century Anthropological Hoax, many scholars concurred with his analysis. They concluded that Rafinesque had been either the perpetrator, or perhaps the victim, of a hoax. Other scholars, writers, and some among the Lenape continue to find the account plausible and support its authenticity.

=== Study of prehistoric cultures ===
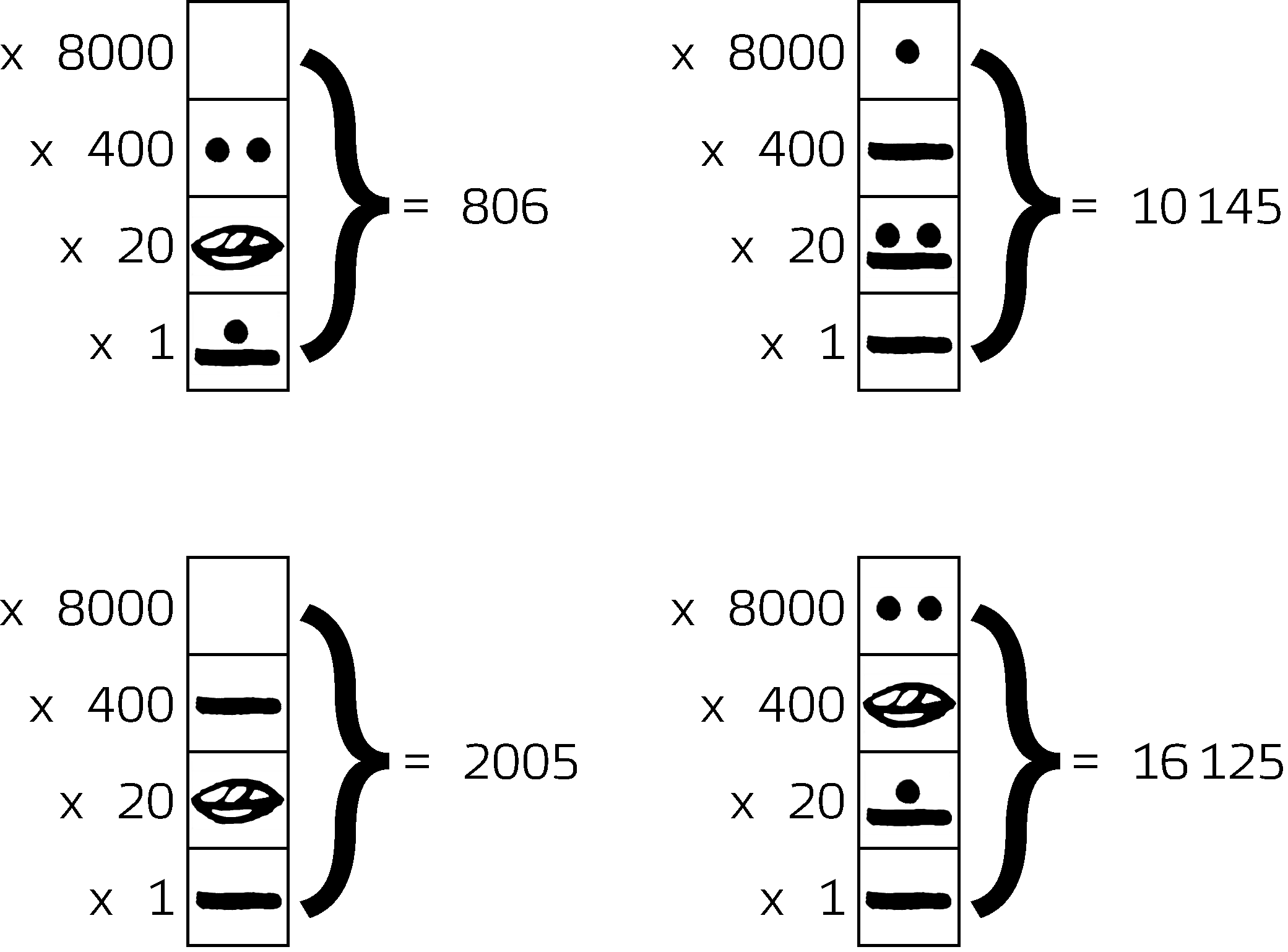
Examples of calculating the value of Mayan numerals

Rafinesque made a notable contribution to North American prehistory with his studies of ancient earthworks of the Adena and Hopewell cultures, especially in the Ohio Valley. He was the first to identify these as the "Ancient Monuments of America". He listed more than 500 such archaeological sites in Ohio and Kentucky. Rafinesque never excavated; rather, he recorded the sites visited by careful measurements, sketches, and written descriptions. Only a few of his descriptions were published, with his friend John D. Clifford's series "Indian Antiquities", eight long letters in Lexington's short-lived Western Review and Miscellaneous Magazine (1819–1820). Clifford died suddenly in 1820, ending his contributions.

Rafinesque's work was used by others. For instance, he identified 148 ancient earthworks sites in Kentucky. All sites in Kentucky that were included by E. G. Squier and Davis in their notable Ancient Monuments of the Mississippi Valley (1848), completed for the Smithsonian Institution, were first identified by Rafinesque in his manuscripts.

Rafinesque also made contributions to Mesoamerican studies. The latter were based on linguistic data, which he extracted from printed sources, mostly those of travelers. He designated as Taino, the ancient language of the Caribbean island of Hispaniola. Others later also used the term to identify the ethnicity of Indigenous Caribbean peoples.

Although mistaken in his presumption that the ancient Maya script was alphabetical in nature, Rafinesque was probably first to insist that studying modern Mayan languages could lead to deciphering the ancient script. In 1832, he was the first to partly decipher ancient Maya. He explained that its bar-and-dot symbols represent fives and ones, respectively.

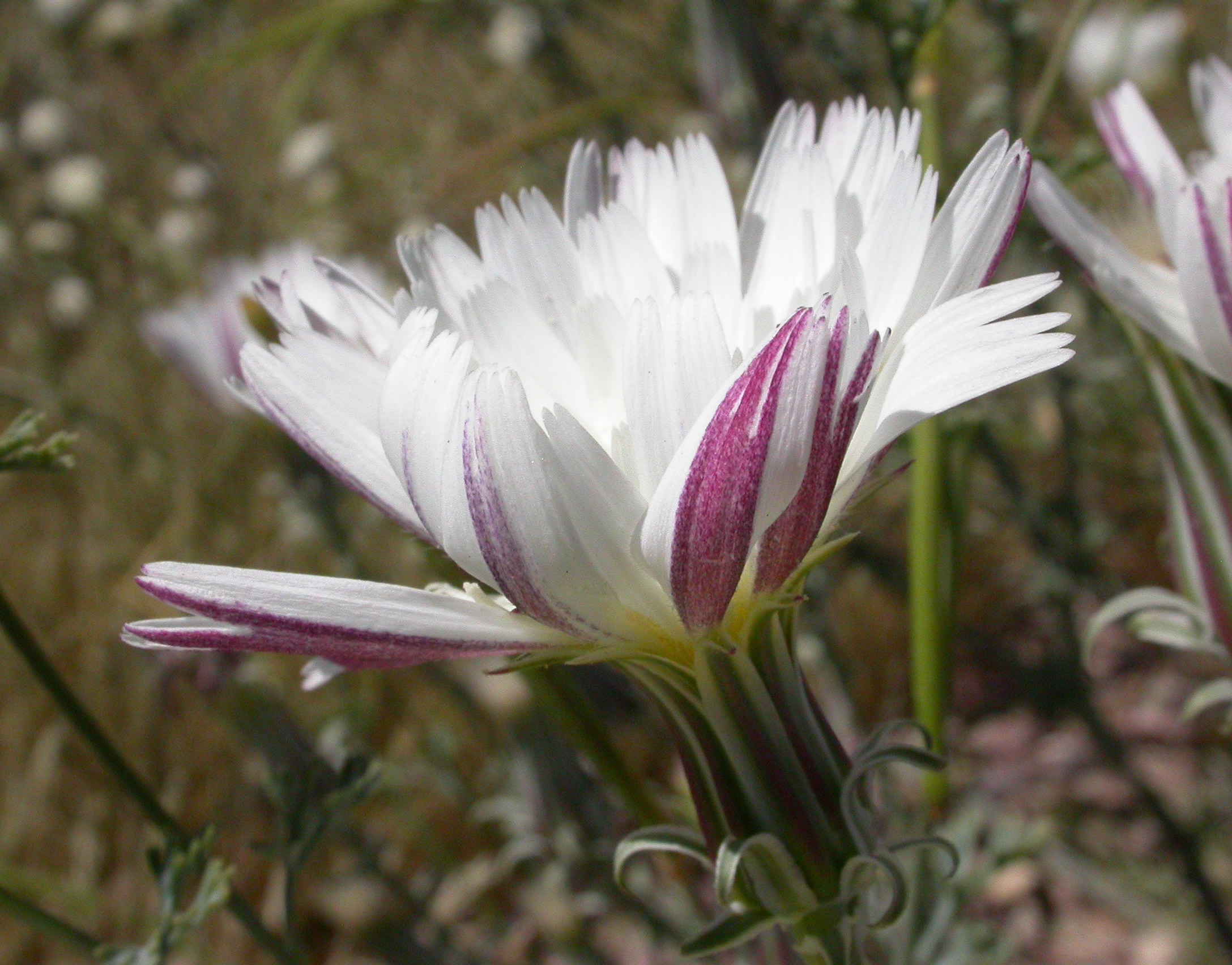
The genus Rafinesquia was named in Rafinesque's honor.

=== Legacy ===
According to historian George Daniels, Rafinesque was a brilliant but erratic naturalist who roamed the American wilderness. His style was offputting to the emerging professionalization of science, and his achievements were controversial at the time and by historians ever since. By 1820, he was virtually an outcast in the scientific community as all the important publications rejected his submissions. The two leading American scientists of the day, Benjamin Silliman and Asa Gray, were harshly critical. Modern historians agree that Rafinesque was often hasty, and tried to claim credit properly due to other researchers. Scientists were troubled that his theory of evolution – long before Darwin – seemed to be based more on his speculation and exaggerations than on solid research. Despite all his faults, says Daniels, "he made enormous contributions to the natural history phase of American science...with the establishment of 34 genera and 24 species of American fishes." He was also a brilliant teacher at Transylvania University.

- In 1838, the white-spotted lantern fish was named Collettia rafinesquii in his honour by Anastasio Cocco; it has since been moved to Diaphus rafinesquii.
- In 1841, Thomas Nuttall named a new genus Rafinesquia after Rafinesque. He felt indebted to the naturalist, who had inspired his work and given Nuttall's Flora a positive review. The genus now contains two species, Rafinesquia californica Nutt. (California plumeseed or California chicory) and Rafinesquia neomexicana A. Gray (desert chicory or plumeseed).
- In 1892, James Hall and J. M. Clarke proposed the genus name Rafinesquina in honor of Rafinesque for a number of fossil brachiopod species then belonging to genus Leptaena; the genus is now in the family Rafinesquinidae.
- In 1896, the fish genus Rafinesquiellus was named by Jordan & Evermann, though it was subsequently synonymized under the genus Etheostoma.

== Published works ==
- 1810: Indice d'ittiologia siciliana ossia catalogo metodico dei nomi latini, italiani, e siciliani dei pesci, che si rinvengono in Sicilia disposti secondo un metodo naturale eseguito da un appendice che contiene la descrizione di alcuni nuovi pesci siciliani. Opuscolo del signore C.S. Rafinesque Schmaltz. Messina. 70 pp. + 2 plates.
- 1810: Caratteri di Alcuni Nuovi Generi e Nuove Specie di Animali e Piante della Sicilia. Palermo.
- 1814: Specchio delle Scienze. Palermo.
- 1814: Précis des Découvertes et Travaux Somiologiques. Palermo.
- 1814: Principes Fondamentaux de Somiologie. Palermo.
- 1815: Analyse de la Nature ou tableau de l'univers et des corps organisés. Palermo, 223 pp.
- 1815–1840: Autikon Botanikon. Philadelphia.
- 1817: Florula ludoviciana; or, A flora of the state of Louisiana. New York: C. Wiley & Co.
- 1818: Description of three new genera of fluviatile fish, Pomoxis, Sarchirus and Exoglossum. Journal of the Academy of Natural Sciences of Philadelphia 1, 417–422. (Read 1 and 8 December 1818) (BHL link)
- 1819: "Dissertation on Water-Snakes", published in the London Literary Gazette.
- 1820: Ichthyologia Ohiensis. Lexington.
- 1824: Ancient History, or Annals of Kentucky. Frankfort.
- 1825: Neogenyton. Lexington.
- 1828–1830: Medical Flora, a Manual of the Medical Botany of the United States of North America (two volumes). Philadelphia.
- 1830: American manual of the grape vines and the art of making wine. Philadelphia: Printed for the author. 1830.
- 1832: American Florist

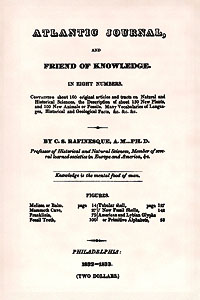
Atlantic Journal (1832–1833)

- 1832: "Philology. Second letter to Mr. Champollion on the graphic systems of America, and the glyphs of Otolum or Palenque, in Central America – Elements of the glyphs". Atlantic Journal and Friend of Knowledge. 1 (2): 40–44. 1832.
- 1832–1833: Atlantic Journal and Friend of Knowledge. Philadelphia.
- 1833: Herbarium Rafinesquianum. Philadelphia.
- 1836: A Life of Travels. Philadelphia.
- 1836: Flora Telluriana. Philadelphia: H. Probasco. 5 October 2023. Pars Prima, Pars Secunda, Pars Tertia & Pars IV Et Ult.
- 1836: The American Nations (two volumes). Philadelphia.
- 1836: A Life of Travels and Researches in North America and South Europe
- 1836: "The World", a poem.
- 1836–1838: New Flora and Botany of North America (four parts). Philadelphia.
- 1837: Safe Banking
- 1837: Notes to Thomas Wright's Original Theory, or New Hypothesis of the Universe.
- 1838: Genius and Spirit of the Hebrew Bible. Philadelphia.
- 1838: Alsographia Americana. Philadelphia.
- 1838: The American Monuments of North and South America. Philadelphia.
- 1838: Sylva Telluriana. Philadelphia.
- 1839: Celestial Wonders and Philosophy of the Visible Heavens.
- 1840: The Good Book (Amenities of Nature). Philadelphia.
- 1840: Pleasure and Duties of Wealth.

=== In popular culture ===
John Jeremiah Sullivan's essay La-Hwi-Ne-Ski: Career of an Eccentric Naturalist, which appears in his 2011 collection, Pulphead, chronicles the life and times of Rafinesque.

=== Correspondence ===
- Betts, Edwin M. (1944). "The Correspondence between Constantine Samuel Rafinesque and Thomas Jefferson". Proceedings of the American Philosophical Society. 87 (5): 368–380. JSTOR 985288.
- Boewe, Charles (1980). "Editing Rafinesque holographs: the case of the short letters". Filson Club History Quarterly. 54 (1): 37–49. PMID 11616973.

== See also ==
- Rafinesque's big-eared bat
