= Erin Harpe & the Delta Swingers =

American Delta blues band

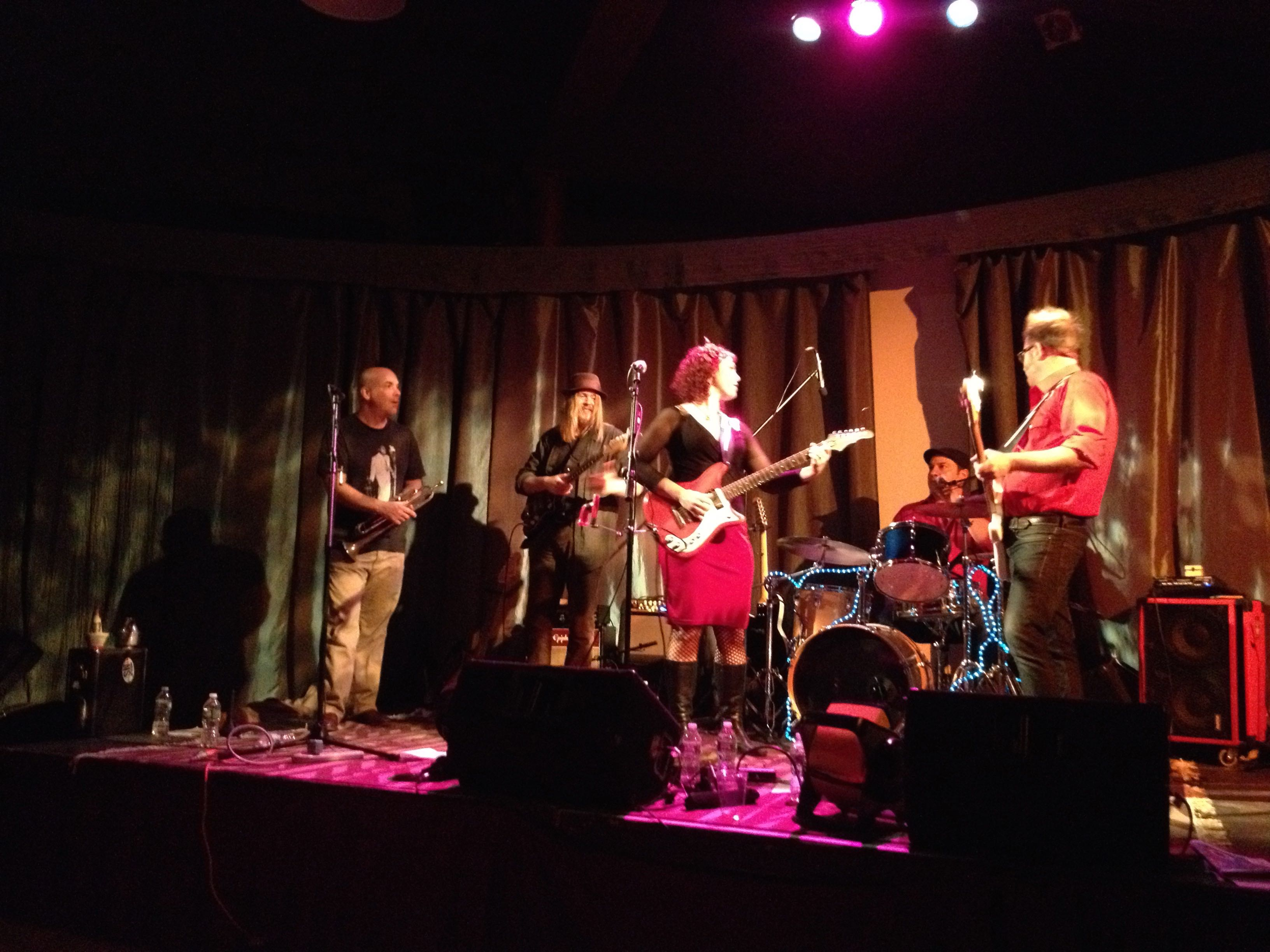
- Pictured in 2014

Background information
- Origin: Jamaica Plain, Massachusetts, United States
- Genres: Delta blues, soul, funk, reggae
- Years active: 2010–present
- Label: VizzTone Label Group
- Spinoff of: Lovewhip
- Members: Erin Harpe; Jim Countryman
- Website: erinharpe.com

Erin Harpe & the Delta Swingers are an American Delta blues band from Jamaica Plain, Massachusetts, United States. Formed in 2010, the group features founding members Erin Harpe (lead vocals and guitar) and Jim Countryman (electric bass).

They released their debut album, Love Whip Blues, in 2014. Their sophomore effort, Big Road, followed in 2017. A festive album, The Christmas Swing, was released in December 2018.

With the location in which they formed in mind, Harpe describes the band's sound as Charles River Delta blues, a fictional genre that gave its name to a track on Love Whip Blues.

== History ==
=== Erin Harpe's career ===
Erin Harpe grew up in Greenbelt, Maryland. She graduated Eleanor Roosevelt High School, before studying anthropology at Earlham College.

Harpe's father, Neil, is a blues musician who played in a band called Franklin Harpe and Usilton.

Although his daughter grew up with music around her, she did not pick up an instrument until fourth grade, when she opted to play the flute. She played that for about ten years, before a young love interest, who knew all of the lyrics to "Alice's Restaurant," turned her head to the guitar. “I ran home and said, ‘Dad, you’ve got to teach me how to play it.’ After that, I was hooked. I could pick it up really easily, so I said, ‘Screw the flute’ and learned finger-picking blues guitar.”

Harpe started to play at folk festivals and coffeehouses in her 20s. She later moved to Boston and met bass player Jim Countryman, whom she married in 1999. Harpe has stated "he’s my partner (as an artist) and my manager. I’m the artistic director, visual and musical.” Together, they formed the electro-funk dance band Lovewhip in 1998, releasing four studio albums and one live set, winning a Boston Music Award in 2004 for "World Music Act of the Year".

Harpe released her debut solo album Blues Roots in 2002. It was a set of covers by artists such as Memphis Minnie (Harpe's main influence), Bessie Smith and Tommy Johnson.

Six years later she released Delta Blues Duets, which included duets recorded with her father.

A second solo album, Meet Me in the Middle, was released on October 30, 2020. A single and the first track on the album, "All Night Long", was released the previous month. Recorded by Harpe and Jim Countryman at home during COVID-19 pandemic, it won Album of the Year at the 2021 New England Music Awards.

=== Delta Swingers ===
In May 2010, Harpe formed the Delta Swingers quartet. Alongside Countryman, harmonica player Richard "Rosy" Rosenblatt and drummer Bob Nisi were brought in as the last of the original members. Four months later, the band won their first Boston Blues Challenge and represented Boston in the 2011 International Blues Challenge (IBC), at which they made it to the semi-finals. The band returned to the IBC again in 2013 (as a quintet) and 2016 (again making the semi-finals). Several soloists performed with the group, including "Sonny" Jim Clifford on slide guitar and harmonica (during the period where they were a quintet along with Richard Rosenblatt).

An initial attempt to disband Lovewhip to focus on the Swingers was rebuked by fans. “We tried to end Lovewhip but fans revolted,” Harpe said in 2014.

In April 2014, Harpe and Countryman, who also doubles as the band's general manager and booking agent, toured the United Kingdom as the Acoustic Blues Duo, with the former on acoustic guitar and the latter on ukulele bass.

After signing to Newton-based VizzTone Label Group (founded by Rosenblatt) in late 2014, the Swingers released their debut album, Love Whip Blues, on November 4, 2014. The title (and second track on the album) is derived from the band's alter ego, Lovewhip. Produced in collaboration with Dave Gross, of Fat Rabbit Studios, the album features ten tracks — four originals and six interpretations of songs by Willie Brown, Lucille Bogan, Luke Jordan, William Moore and John Prine.

Richard Rosenblatt left the group in 2015, after which Matthew Prozialeck took over on harmonica. Bob Nisi left the group and was replaced by Kendall Divoll in 2016. Countryman fell ill in July 2017 and was hospitalized with diverticulitis, at which point the band took a break.

The band's second studio album, titled Big Road, was released in October 2017, its title taken from a lyric in the second song, Harpe's self-penned "Lonely Leavin' Town". Four of the tracks are original; the other six are covers. Harpe was producer with Countryman, Prozialeck, and Kendall Divoll co producing. Most of the album was recorded and mixed at Verdant Studio in Athens, Vermont, the exceptions being "Frankie" and "Guilty", which were recorded at Funk Bunker Studio in Arlington, Massachusetts. Big Road peaked at number 9 on the Roots Music Report blues albums chart and was ranked number 52 on their best of 2018 list.

The band released their first Christmas album the following year, titled A Christmas Swing. Matt Prozialeck departed the group at the beginning of 2019.

Harpe won the Boston Blues Challenge, for the fifth time (first time as a solo artist), in 2018, and attended the five-day International Blues Challenge in Memphis, Tennessee, in January 2019. The band have reached the semi-finals of the competition four times: in 2011, 2013, 2017 and 2019.

== Band members ==
Present

- Erin Harpe – vocals, acoustic and electric guitars (2010–present)
- Jim Countryman – electric bass (2010–present)

Former

- Richard "Rosy" Rosenblatt – harmonica (2010–2016)
- Bob Nisi – drums and background vocals (2010–2016)
- "Sonny" Jim Clifford – slide guitar (2013–2015)
- Kendall Divoll – drums (2016–2017, 2018)
- Devin Vaillancourt – drums (2017–2018)
- Garrett Cameron – drums and backing vocals (2018)
- Mike Santucci – drums (2018–2019)
- Matthew Prozialeck – harmonica and percussion (2015–2019)
- Jason Novak (2019–2020)
- Dylan DiChiara – drums (2019–2020)
- Renato Milone – drums (2019)
- Shawn Meehan – drums (2019–2020)

== Discography ==
=== Erin Harpe solo ===
Blues Roots (2002)

1. "Chauffeur Blues" (Memphis Minnie)
2. "Alligatoe Blues" (Bessie Smith)
3. "One Thing I Like About That Man of Mine" (William Moore)
4. "Bye Bye Blues" (Tommy Johnson)
5. "Big Bad Bill" (Yellen/Ager)
6. "In My Girlish Days" (Memphis Minnie)
7. "The M&O Blues" (Lucille Bogan)
8. "You Gonna Quit Me Blues" (Blind Blake)
9. "Big Road Blues" (Tommy Johnson)
10. "Pick Poor Robin Clean" (Luke Jordan)
11. "Future Blues" (Willie Brown)
12. "Stop and Listen Blues" (Eleanor Ellis)

Meet Me in the Middle (2020)

1. "All Night Long" (Harpe)
2. "Hard Luck Woman" (Harpe)
3. "Meet Me in the Middle" (Harpe)
4. "Women Be Wise" (Sippie Wallace)
5. "I Hate That Train Called the M&O" (Lucille Bogan)
6. "Rollin' and Tumblin'" (Traditional)
7. "Pick Poor Robin Clean" (Luke Jordan)
8. "When I Lay My Burden Down" (Traditional)
9. "What's the Matter with the Mill" (Memphis Minnie)
10. "One Fine Day" (Harpe)
- Personnel: Erin Harpe, Jim Countryman

=== Erin & Neil Harpe ===
Delta Blues Duets (2008)

1. "Bye Bye Blues" (Tommy Johnson)
2. "Called You This Mornin'" (Memphis Minnie)
3. "Chauffeur Blues" (Memphis Minnie)
4. "Kokomo Blues"
5. "Fishin' Blues"
6. "In My Girlish Days" (Memphis Minnie)
7. "Mississippi Delta Blues"
8. "Down and Out"
9. "Stop and Listen Blues" (Eleanor Ellis)
10. "Winnie the Wailer"

=== Erin Harpe & the Delta Swingers ===
Love Whip Blues (2014)

1. "The Delta Swing" (4:39) (Harpe/Rosenblatt)
2. "Love Whip Blues" (3:11) (Rosenblatt/Harpe)
3. "Future Blues" (4:18) (Willie Brown)
4. "Good Luck Baby" (4:22) (Rosenblatt/Harpe/Countryman)
5. "The M&O Blues" (5:36) (Lucille Bogan)
6. "One Way Man" (4:34) (based on "One Way Gal" by William Moore)
7. "Pick Poor Robin Clean" (3:06) (Luke Jordan)
8. "Virtual Booty Blues" (4:07) (Harpe/Countryman)
9. "Charles River Delta Blues" (4:31) (based on "Mississippi Blues" by Willie Brown)
10. "Angel from Montgomery" (5:26) (John Prine)
- Personnel: Erin Harpe, Jim Countryman, Richard Rosenblatt, "Sonny" Jim Clifford, Bob Nisi
- Producer: Dave Gross

Big Road (2017)

1. "Kokomo" (5:33) (Mississippi Fred McDowell)
2. "Lonely Leavin' Town" (5:54) (Harpe)
3. "Big Road"(4:12) (Tommy Johnson)
4. "Frankie" (3:42) (Mississippi John Hurt)
5. "Shake Your Hips" (8:22) (Slim Harpo)
6. "Casey Jones" (3:58) (Mississippi John Hurt)
7. "Voodoo Blues" (3:37) (Harpe)
8. "Stop & Listen" (3:02) (Harpe)
9. "Guilty" (2:24) (Randy Newman)
10. "Gimme That (Somethin' Special)" (6:36) (Dave Geissler/Lovewhip)
- Personnel: Erin Harpe, Jim Countryman, Matt Prozialeck, Kendall Divoll, Michael Casavat (organ on "Lonely Leavin' Town" and "Shake Your Hips"; accordion on "Voodoo Blues")
- Producers: Erin Harpe, Erin Harpe & the Delta Swingers

The Christmas Swing (2018)

1. "Jingle Bell Blues" (Erin Harpe)
2. "Merry Christmas" (Lightnin' Hopkins)
3. "The Night Before Christmas" (Harpe)
4. "At the Christmas Ball" (Bessie Smith)
5. "Merry Christmas (Here I Come)" (Lou Psyche)
6. "The Christmas Swing" (Harpe)
7. "Christmas is A-Comin'" (Lead Belly)
8. "Drink and Get Drunk" (Bo Carter)
9. "Run Run Rudolph" (Chuck Berry)
10. "Auld Lang Syne" (Robert Burns)
- Personnel: Erin Harpe, Jim Countryman, Matt Prozialeck, Chris Anzalone, John Juxo (piano on "At the Christmas Ball), Richard Rosenblatt (harp on "The Christmas Swing")
- Producer: Erin Harpe, Erin Harpe & the Delta Swingers

== Accolades ==
- New England Music Awards: "Blues Act of the Year" winners 2019; "Album of the Year" winners 2021 (for Meet Me in the Middle)
- Boston Blues Challenge: winners 2010, 2012, 2014, 2018
- Boston Music Awards: "Blues Act of the Year" winners 2012
- Granite State Blues Challenge: winners 2016
- International Blues Challenge: semi-finalists 2011, 2013, 2017, 2019
