= Motherless Child Blues =

"Motherless Child Blues" (or, in dialect, "Motherless Chile Blues") is the name of two distinct traditional blues songs. They are different melodically and lyrically. One was first popularized by Robert "Barbecue Bob" Hicks, the other by Elvie Thomas.

== "Motherless Child Blues" (Hicks) ==
The song recorded by Hicks in 1927 tells of the singer's lack of respect for women and disenchantment with them. The song begins with the lyrics that give it its name:

If I mistreat you gal, I sure don't mean you no harm.
I'm a motherless child and I don't know right from wrong.

The other verses in the Hicks version are:

Please tell me pretty mama, honey where you stay last night?/Tell me, pretty mama, Lord, honey where you stay last night?/You didn't come home 'til the sun was shining bright.

I have to go so far, to get my hambones boiled./I have to go so far, gal, to get my hambones boiled./These Atlanta women, won't let my hambones boiled.

I done done more for you, than your daddy ever done. /I did more for you gal, than you daddy ever done. /I give you my jelly, he ain't gives you none.

When you see two women, always running hand in hand. /When you see two women, always running hand in hand. /You can bet your bottom dollar, one's got the other one's man.

I'm going to the river, get me a tangled rocking chair. /I'm going to the river, get me a tangled rocking chair. /If the blues overtake me, I'm gonna rock away from there.

This song has been performed by the jazz musician Jimmy Scott and in a drum-and-bass reworking by the Scottish electronic artist Colin Waterson.

Eric Clapton adapted the song, retitled "Motherless Child", and recorded it for his 1994 album From the Cradle. Released as a single, the song reached number 23 on Billboard's mainstream rock chart.

A song with a similar title, "Motherless Children" (also covered by Clapton), is a blues standard, versions of which have been recorded by Bob Dylan, Dave Van Ronk and Lucinda Williams.

== "Motherless Child Blues" (Thomas) ==
The song recorded by Elvie Thomas with Geeshie Wiley in 1930 tells of a daughter not following her dead mother's advice:

Mother told me just before she died,
...
Oh daughter, Oh daughter, please don't be like me,
To fall in love with every man you see.
