= Last Kind Words Blues =

1930 blues song by Geeshie Wiley

Song by Geeshie Wiley and Elvie Thomas
- Released: 1930
- Genre: Delta blues
- Label: Paramount Records
- Songwriter: Geeshie Wiley

"Last Kind Words Blues", more commonly known as "Last Kind Words", is a 1930 blues song, written by Geeshie Wiley, and performed and recorded by Geeshie Wiley and Elvie Thomas. It was released on the Paramount Records label in July 1930, with "Skinny Leg Blues" as the B-side.

== History ==
"Last Kind Word Blues" was sung and performed on guitar by Geeshie Wiley, with Elvie Thomas providing additional guitar accompaniment. The lyrics reflect on the singer's father, who went to serve in the "German War" (World War I) and before he left, told her: "If I die (...) I want you to send my body to my mother." However, he also told her that he did not want a burial and preferred to be left outside, to "let the buzzards eat me whole." The female protagonist in the song went to the depot, but cried as "some train don't come, there'll be some walkin' done." The song then concludes with the last words of the protagonist's mother. She told her daughter to "not be so wild", and commented that the Mississippi River is "so deep and wide I can stand right here, see my babe from the other side." The dying woman then concluded: "I may not see you after I cross the deep blue sea."

The song's haunting lyrics and atmosphere have been praised by many listeners and music critics.

== Crumb ==
"Last Kind Word Blues" gained more notability after being featured in the 1994 documentary film Crumb by Terry Zwigoff, about cartoonist Robert Crumb. In one scene, Crumb talks about his love for old blues, country and jazz music from the 1920s and 1930s and puts a record on the needle. The soundtrack then plays "Last Kind Words" over a series of strange and disturbing images from Crumb's comics. Yet, as Crumb himself pointed out in interviews, he does not actually own "Last Kind Words" on shellac, since original pressings of this record are extraordinarily rare. On Crumb's official website, he declared "Last Kind Words"; "the greatest female vocal.". Crumb was also interviewed in 2014 for a New York Times article about Geeshie Wiley and Elvie Thomas.

Thanks to Crumb, music historians such as Greil Marcus have tried to find out more about the identity of Wiley and Thomas. "Last Kind Word Blues" itself has also been included on several compilation albums, including the official soundtrack album of the film, Crumb, but also blues compilation records including The Rough Guide To Delta Blues (World Music Network, 2002), Mississippi Masters: Early American Blues Classics 1927-35 (Yazoo Records, 2007), American Epic: The Collection (Sony Legacy, Lo-Max, 2017) and American Epic: The Best of Blues (Sony Legacy, Third Man Records, 2017).

"Last Kind Words" was also included on the compilation record Chimpin' The Blues (East River Records, 2013), for whom Robert Crumb illustrated the album cover.

== Covers ==
"Last Kind Word Blues" has been covered by several artists:

- David Johansen and the Harry Smiths on their album Shaker (2002). Johansen also sang a portion of "Last Kind Words" in the movie Searching for the Wrong-Eyed Jesus (2003).
- C. W. Stoneking on the album Mississippi & Piedmont Blues 1927–1941 (2006).
- Dex Romweber Duo released a version featuring Jack White, on White's vinyl-only label, Third Man Records.
- Christine Pizzuti covered it, available on Music from The American Epic Sessions: Original Motion Picture Soundtrack (2017).
- Ransom Riggs used the song in his video "Talking Pictures", in which he talks about vintage photographs.
- Rhiannon Giddens (member of Carolina Chocolate Drops) on her solo debut album, Tomorrow Is My Turn.
- The Kronos Quartet performed an arrangement of the song at their fortieth anniversary concert, broadcast in 2013.
- Hogan & Moss on the album You've Been That Friend To Me (2016)
- Robert Plant / Alison Krauss on the album Raise the Roof, released in November 2021.
- Muireann Bradley on the EP Blackwood Pew, released in October 2026.
