= Elvis Thomas =

Elvis Thomas may refer to:

- Elvis Thomas (soccer, born 1972), Canadian soccer player
- Elvis Thomas (footballer, born 1994), Antiguan footballer

== See also ==
- Elvie Thomas (1891–1979), American country blues singer and guitarist
