= Matthew Prozialeck =

American blues harmonica player (born 1989)

- Also known as: Matt Charles
- Born: Matthew Charles Prozialeck; September 3, 1989 (age 37); Philadelphia, Pennsylvania, United States
- Origin: Chicago, Illinois, U.S.
- Genres: Blues, Chicago blues, Delta blues
- Occupation: Musician
- Instruments: Harmonica, vocals

Matthew Prozialeck (born September 3, 1989), also known as Matt Charles and Matt Prozialeck, is an American blues harmonica player. He is best known for being a member of Erin Harpe & the Delta Swingers and also for his solo and session work. He has performed with many different blues artists and has appeared on several charting releases.

== Background ==
Matthew Prozialeck was born in Philadelphia, Pennsylvania. He is the son of Scientist Walter Prozialeck.He grew up in Naperville, west of Chicago, Illinois. He graduated from Naperville North High School in 2008 and was a member of the 2007 8A state champion varsity football team. He graduated from Northern Illinois University in 2013 with a degree in Graphic design. He played trumpet as a child but never played the harmonica until he lived in the college art dormitory. While at school he was inspired by Paul Butterfield, Howlin Wolf, Little Walter, and Charlie Musselwhite to learn the harmonica. He then began to study Chicago blues and jam in clubs in Chicago.

== Career ==
=== Early career ===
He started playing professionally in college. He learned to play the harmonica and played around the local blues scene for years. He was a member of The Ed Burns Rhythm & Blues Revue for most of 2014. During that time he began using his middle name Charles going by Matt or Matthew Charles due to the difficulty some have pronouncing his last name. In 2015, Prozialeck relocated to Boston, Massachusetts join the Vizztone band, Erin Harpe & the Delta Swingers. The Delta Swingers toured nationally and were semifinalists in the International Blues Challenge in 2017. At the age of 27 he was the second youngest harmonica player in the competition and the youngest to reach the semifinals that year. His first album with the Delta Swingers, Big Road, was released on Vizztone in October 2017 to positive reviews. In a review of the album by Daniel Pavlica of The Rocktologist, his playing was recognized and the reviewer said he "played with poignancy and lusty confidence". Big Road peaked at number 9 on the Roots Music Report Blues Albums Chart and was ranked number 52 on their best of 2018 list. A 2018 article in Blues Blast Magazine described Prozialeck as the band's "secret weapon". In 2017, he became an official endorser for Seydel harmonicas. The Delta Swingers were nominated for a Boston Music Award and three New England Music Awards in 2018. The band opened for Roomful Of Blues, Lil' Ed Williams, James Montgomery and Jason Ricci among many others during his tenure. He appeared on their album The Christmas Swing which would be his last release with the band in December 2018.

=== Solo career ===
In January 2019, he left Erin Harpe & the Delta Swingers to record and focus on solo and session work. He played with GA-20 in the beginning of 2018 before their trio lineup was established. Later in May of 2018, he played on a couple songs for the sessions for GA-20's debut album, Lonely Soul, as a sideman. It was released in October 2019 on Karma Chef Records and peaked at number 2 on the Billboard Blues Chart. He also appeared on the "GA-20 with Charlie Musselwhite and Luther Dickinson"' 7 inch single, playing harp on the B-side "Sit Down Baby" and singing backup on the A-side, "Naggin' On My Mind". He also appeared playing harmonica on their digital single "I Ain't Got You" in 2020. In October 2019 he co-founded the Boston based blues band The Wandering Ones. The Wandering Ones' first release appeared on The Rum Bar Records compilation Rabble Rousers. Prozialeck took a hiatus from performing during the COVID Pandemic. The Wandering Ones performed at the final Viva East Rockabilly festival in 2022. In 2024 Prozialeck released his debut solo album Highland Avenue. It was produced by Matthew Stubbs and recorded at Q Division Studios in Boston.

== Discography ==
=== Albums ===
Artist	Release title	Catalogue	Year	Fmt	Role	Notes
Erin Harpe & the Delta Swingers	Big Road	Vizztone Label Group 634457798410; VTJJ02	2017	LP, CD	Acoustic and amplified harmonica, producer	Band member
Erin Harpe & the Delta Swingers	The Christmas Swing	Vizztone Label Group CDVTJJ 003	2018	CD	Harmonica, engineer	Band member
GA-20	Lonely Soul	Karma Chief Records	2019	LP; CD	Harmonica track 2, backing vocals track 1	Session musician
Jesse Ahern	Heartache & Love	Self Release	2021	LP; CD	Harmonica on two tracks	Session musician
Matt Charles	Highland Avenue	Self Release	2024	Digital, streaming	Harmonica, Lead vocals, Producer	Matthew Stubbs - Producer, bass, and guitar, Pat Faherty -guitar and bass, Chris Anzalone -Drums

=== Solo singles ===
Artist	Release title	Catalogue	Year	Fmt	Role	Notes
Matt Charles	"What's Shakin'"	Songco Records SR-001	2020	Digital single	Harmonica, Bandleader, Songwriter	First solo release
Matt Charles	"Who Do You Think You Are?'"	Songco Records SR-002	2021	Digital single	Lead Vocals, Harmonica, Bandleader, Songwriter	

=== Singles as sideman ===
Artist	Release title	Catalogue	Year	Fmt	Role	Notes
Pariah feat. Smitty Spits & Daisy Chains	"Royal Stoned"	Ninth Order Productions	2018	Digital single	Harmonica, Engineer	
GA-20 with Charlie Musselwhite and Luther Dickinson	"Naggin On My Mind/ Sit Down Baby"	Karma Chief Records – KCR-105	2019	7 inch single	Harmonica on B-Side, backing vocals on A-Side	
