= Colin Waterson =

Colin Waterson may refer to:

- Colin Waterson (footballer) (born 1959), Australian rules footballer
- Waterson (musician) (born Colin Waterson), Scottish musician
