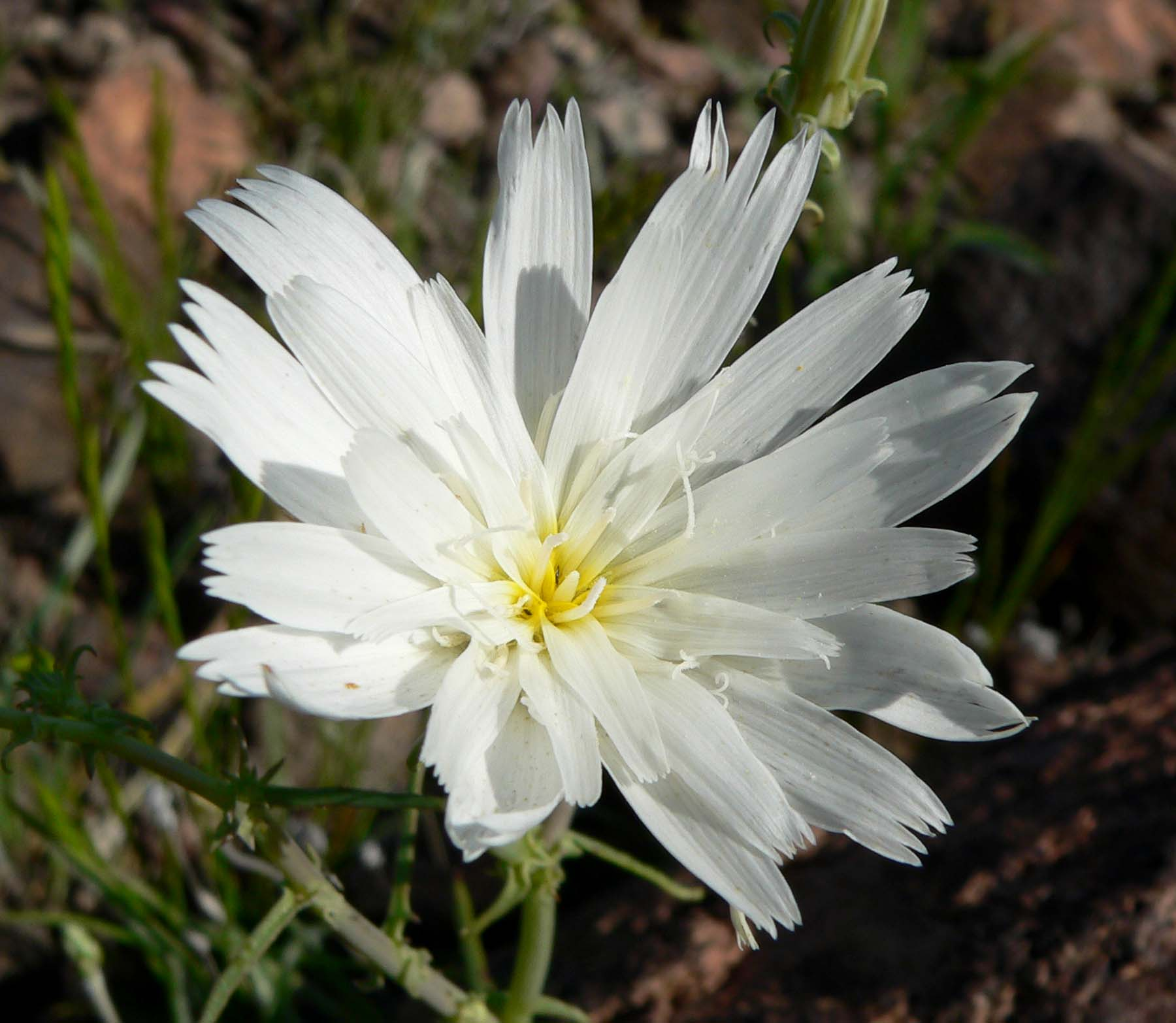
- Rafinesquia neomexicana

Scientific classification
- Kingdom: Plantae
- Clade: Tracheophytes
- Clade: Angiosperms
- Clade: Eudicots
- Clade: Asterids
- Order: Asterales
- Family: Asteraceae
- Subfamily: Cichorioideae
- Tribe: Cichorieae
- Subtribe: Microseridinae
- Genus: Rafinesquia; Nutt. 1841, conserved name not Raf. 1836 (Fabaceae) nor Raf. 1836 (Lamiaceae) nor Raf. 1838 (Bignoniaceae) nor Raf. 1841 (unknown family)

Synonyms
- Nemoseris Greene

= Rafinesquia =

Genus of plants

Rafinesquia, commonly known as plumeseed, is a genus of flowering plants in the family Asteraceae, native to the western United States and northwestern Mexico.

The genus was named for polymath Constantine Samuel Rafinesque by botanist Thomas Nuttall in 1841.

== Species ==
Rafinesquia consists of two species:

- Rafinesquia californica Nutt. (California plumeseed, California chicory) - Baja California, Sonora, USA (CA OR NV AZ UT)
- Rafinesquia neomexicana A.Gray (New Mexico plumeseed, desert chicory) - Baja California, Sonora, USA (CA NV AZ UT NM TX)
