= Geeshie Wiley =

American musician, singer and songwriter (1908–1950)

- Also known as: Lillie Mae Scott (possible); Lillie Mae Wiley
- Born: Lillie Mae Boone (possible); November 14, 1908; Louisiana, U.S. (possible)
- Died: July 29, 1950 (aged 41) Texas, U.S. (possible)
- Genres: Blues, country blues
- Occupations: Singer, songwriter
- Instrument: Guitar
- Label: Paramount

Geeshie Wiley was an American country blues singer and guitar player who recorded six songs for Paramount Records, issued on three records in April 1930. According to the blues historian Don Kent, Wiley "may well have been the rural South's greatest female blues singer and musician". Little is known of her life, and there are no known photographs of her. She may have been born Lillie Mae Boone (November 14, 1908–July 29, 1950), later Lillie Mae Scott.

== Recordings ==
In April 1930, Wiley, who was of African American heritage, traveled with the singer and guitarist Elvie Thomas from Houston, Texas to Grafton, Wisconsin, to make recordings for Paramount Records. Wiley recorded "Last Kind Words Blues" and "Skinny Leg Blues", singing and accompanying herself on guitar, with Thomas providing additional guitar accompaniment. Thomas also recorded two songs, "Motherless Child Blues" and "Over to My House," with Wiley playing guitar and singing harmony. Some sources suggest that in March 1931 Wiley and Thomas returned to Grafton and recorded "Pick Poor Robin Clean" and "Eagles on a Half."

Steve Leggett at Allmusic states, "Wiley's vocal on 'Last Kind Word Blues' is by turns weary, wise, angry, defiant, despairing, even wistful, and is simply one of the best performances in early country blues."

It is believed that fewer than ten original copies of Wiley's records have survived.

== Biographical uncertainties ==
"If Geeshie Wiley did not exist, she could not be invented: her scope and creativity dwarfs most blues artists. She seems to represent the moment when black secular music was coalescing into blues."
Don Kent, liner notes to Mississippi Masters: Early American Blues Classics 1927–35 (Yazoo CD 2007, 1994)

Little is known about Wiley, and the few details of her life provided by various sources are inconsistent. "Geeshie" (sometimes spelled "Geechie" or "Geetchie") was probably a nickname.

There have been several conjectures about her life. The musician Ishmon Bracey, a contemporary of Wiley's, stated that she came from Natchez, Mississippi, and was romantically linked with the Delta blues musician Papa Charlie McCoy. It has also been suggested that in the 1920s she worked in a medicine show in Jackson, Mississippi, and that she may have married Casey Bill Weldon after his divorce from Memphis Minnie. The singer and bass player Herbert Wiley, of Oxford, Mississippi, stated that she was a cousin on his father's side and that her family had farmed in South Carolina; his father had told him that she died in 1938 or 1939, and he believed that she may have been buried in the family burial plot in Oxford. The musicologist and genealogist Eric S. LeBlanc suggested that her name was Wadie May Wiley and that she was born near Oxford in 1906.

Research by Robert "Mack" McCormick was developed and publicized by John Jeremiah Sullivan in The New York Times in 2014. McCormick told Sullivan that he had visited Wiley's former home and spoken to members of her immediate family when he was conducting fieldwork in Oklahoma in the 1950s. McCormick also interviewed Wiley's recording partner, L. V. "Elvie" Thomas, in Texas in 1961. Thomas began performing with Wiley in the early 1920s and remembered her as Lillie Mae Wiley; she claimed to have given Wiley her nickname. The nickname "Geechie" (spelled in various ways) was common among people from around coastal South Carolina and Georgia (it is also an alternate name for the Gullah ethnic group of that region), but more generally was an affectionate nickname for a young woman of rural origins in the American South. Thomas said that a few years before the interview (that is, in the 1950s) she had heard that Wiley was living in West Texas. Later research reported by Sullivan suggests that Wiley was born in Louisiana on November 14, 1908, and that she was the same Lillie Mae Scott who stabbed her husband, Thornton Wiley, to death in Houston in 1931. Wiley was nonetheless performing again with Thomas about 1933, on their last tour together. According to McCormick, Thomas said, "I haven’t seen [Wiley] since 1933. I left her in Chico, Oklahoma [presumably Checotah]. ... We’d gone out playing around together, traveling, and I left her up there and came on back." Sullivan also spoke to a Houston musician, John D. "Don" Wilkerson, who claimed to remember Wiley and "implied that there was something funny about her background. He said that she'd been 'maybe Mexican or something.'”

According to researcher Caitlin Love, who worked with Sullivan, Lillie Mae Wiley (née Boone) died from a head injury in 1950, and was buried with her mother Cathrine Nixson in Brushy Cemetery in Burleson County, Texas.

== Legacy ==
"Last Kind Words", "Motherless Child Blues", "Skinny Legs Blues", and "Pick Poor Robin Clean" are included on the compilation album Mississippi Masters: Early American Blues Classics 1927–35 (Yazoo Records, 2007).

In the documentary film Crumb (1994), by Terry Zwigoff, the artist Robert Crumb plays Wiley's recording of "Last Kind Words Blues" and sits down to listen as a sequence of his cartoons is shown.

"Last Kind Words Blues" has been covered by several other artists:

- David Johansen and the Harry Smiths covered it on their 2002 album Shaker. Johansen also sang a portion of "Last Kind Words" in the movie Searching for the Wrong-Eyed Jesus (2003).
- C. W. Stoneking included a faithful cover of the song on his 2006 album Mississippi & Piedmont Blues 1927–1941.
- Dex Romweber Duo released a version featuring Jack White, on White's vinyl-only label, Third Man Records.
- Ransom Riggs used the song in his video "Talking Pictures", in which he talks about vintage photographs.
- Rhiannon Giddens, of the traditional black music group Carolina Chocolate Drops, sang the song on her solo debut album, Tomorrow Is My Turn.
- The Kronos Quartet performed an arrangement of the song at their fortieth anniversary concert, broadcast in 2013.
- "Last Kind Words Blues" appeared on the Robert Plant/Alison Krauss album Raise the Roof, released in November 2021.

"Pick Poor Robin Clean" is performed in the film Sinners, directed by Ryan Coogler. Geeshie Wiley's original version of "Pick Poor Robin Clean" and its cover for the film are featured on the Sinners original motion picture soundtrack.

== Discography ==
Date	Credit	A-side	B-side	Record label
March 1930	Geeshie Wiley	"Last Kind Word Blues"	"Skinny Leg Blues"	Paramount Records 12951
March 1930	Elvie Thomas and Geeshie Wiley	"Motherless Child Blues"	"Over to My House"	Paramount Records 12977
March 1931	Geeshie Wiley and Elvie Thomas	"Pick Poor Robin Clean"	"Eagles on a Half"	Paramount Records 13074
