= C. A. Seydel Söhne =

German harmonica manufacturer

C. A. Seydel Söhne GmbH
- Type: GmbH
- Genre: Musical instrument factory
- Founded: October 27, 1847
- Founder: Christian August Seydel
- Headquarters: Klingenthal/Sa., Germany
- Key people: Lars Seifert, manager
- Products: Harmonicas
- Owner: NIAMA-Media
- Number of employees: 18
- Website: www.seydel1847.com

Christian August Seydel founded the C. A. Seydel Söhne harmonica factory in Klingenthal, Sachsen in 1847. The firm remains the oldest harmonica factory in the world and manufactures a wide range of harmonicas.

== History ==
The Seydels started out as Miners in Sachsenberg-Georgenthal (modern district of Klingenthal) working as miners since the 17th Century. When mining stopped in Vogtland, Saxony, in 1830, brothers Johann Christian and Christian August turned their trade to musical instruments. 1838 Johann Christian Seydel founded the company "I. C. Seydel", where he and his brother worked together.

In 1847, Christian August left the company to start his own, "C. A. Seydel", which was founded on 27 October 1847 as decreed by the court of Untersachsenberg. The 1847 Classic, Silver, Noble and Lightning models of diatonic harmonica all receive their names based on the year of the founding of the company.

In 1876 Johann Christian Seydel died, leaving his widow Christiane Fredericke to manage the company "I. C. Seydel" until the year 1889, whereupon the ownership of the company was transferred to her son Georg Ernst.

Georg Ernst registered six patents, including one for “harmonicas and accordions with movable and adjustable reed plates”, which made the production of chromatic harmonicas possible. In 1906, Georg Ernst took his seven children into the company as partners. His son Kurt Ernst then managed the company in 1922. After Kurt's death, Hugo Götz, husband of Georg Ernst's daughter Frieda, continued to run the business until it was nationalized around 1950.

1882 saw the death of Christian August and the taking over of the company by his son Ernst Richard. The following year Richard's brother Moritz joined the company, since then called "C. A. Seydel Söhne".

C. A. Seydel Söhne had global trading contacts from the late 1890s to 1900. In 1910 Ernst Richard became the sole owner of the company, passing the management over to his sons Emil, Hugo and Curt August, alongside his son-in-law Hans Hugo Bischoffberger just eight years later.

By the time the 1920s rolled around, C. A. Seydel Söhne had employed 800 factory and home workers, with annual production exceeding seven million harmonicas. During this time the Bandmaster and Boomerang harmonicas were produced. However, after the fallout from the Great Depression, Seydel merged with F. A. Rauner, F. A. Bohm and AG to form Rauner-Seydel-Bohm-AG in order to survive. However, this proved unsustainable, and by 1933 C. A. Seydel Söhne had become independent again.

In 1939, the beginning of the Second World War, Hans Hugo Bischoffberger was called up to join the army. In his place Margarete Seydel and Hedwig Bischoffberger (wife of Hans) become the chairmen of the company, running it for the duration of the war.

By the time the 1950s came in, Germany had been split into two blocs: The Federal Republic of Germany and the German Democratic Republic. C. A. Seydel Söhne found themselves under Russian occupancy, the company declared to be under government administration. C. A. Seydel Söhne was named VED Plant 5 of the Klingenthal Harmonika Works. In 1964, the company was incorporated into VEB KHW as "VEB Vermona".

In 1991, following reprivitization, the company returned to the hands of the Seydel heirs Christoph Bischoffberger and Gerhard Raker, who had not been connected with the company in almost fifty years. Gerhard Raker ran the company until it went bankrupt in November 2004. Following the bankruptcy, the company was bought over by NIAMA Media in 2005, which makes it the oldest harmonica manufacturer in the world.

In 2007, Seydel celebrated its 160th anniversary with the Seydel 1847 Limited Edition harmonica, with silver tops.

== Seydel harmonicas ==
=== Blues (diatonic) models ===
1847 series - This series includes the Classic, Silver and Noble. All are similar but the classic has a wood comb, Silver has a plastic comb and the Noble has an aluminum comb with vented sides. The 160th anniversary model is similar but with luxury components and is only available in the key of C. Only 160 of these were produced. These models have stainless steel reeds.

Lightning - The latest and top-of-the-line 1847 model is the Lightning, made of steel including the comb. Aside from the luxury components and extra attention to every detail the biggest feature is the use of polished steel reeds. The polishing process adds to the quality of the sound and the longevity of the reeds, removing any future spots for reed failure. The comb being made of steel makes this model heftier to hold. The harmonica is designed with polished mouth holes, which are intended to enhance comfort during play.

Big Six - These models have only six holes with stainless steel reeds. The classic model is only available in the key of C and has a wood comb. The standard model is available in six keys and six colors. The blues version is tuned like the first six holes of a standard diatonic. The folk version is tuned to holes 4–9 on a standard diatonic.

Session Steel - This model has an orange plastic comb (or other colors if it is a Summer or Winter edition harmonica). It has stainless steel reeds and full-length covers.

Favorite - This model has brass reeds and an aluminum comb.

Session - This model is the same as the Session Steel but with brass reeds and a black comb. The "antique" version has brass-colored cover plates.

Soloist Pro - This model is similar to the Hohner Marine Band 1896, but with rounded holes and screws.

Soloist Pro 12 Steel - This model is similar to the Hohner SBS. However, this model has 12 holes instead of 14 is available in Low C, Low D, C, and A. The idea is that one gets a low octave under the standard diatonic. However compared to the SBS, this model is missing the 10 hole on a standard diatonic.

=== Chromatic models ===
Symphony - High-end 16-holer with stainless steel reeds.

Saxony - This model is a chromatic harmonica with stainless steel reeds.

Nonslider - This model can be played hands free.

De Luxe - High-end chromatic model with brass reeds.

De Luxe Steel - Same as the De Luxe, with stainless steel reeds and an improved mouthpiece.

Standard - Standard chromatic model with brass reeds.

=== Tremolo and octave models ===
Fanfare-S - This model is a tremolo model with stainless steel reeds.

Fanfare - This model is the same as Fanfare-S with brass reeds.

Sailor - Standard model with brass reeds.

Sailor Steel - Traditionally-shaped tremolo harmonica with stainless steel reeds and Richter-tuning.

Mountain harp - Standard model, larger than Sailor model.

Concerto - Octave model with brass reeds.

Club- Curved octave harmonica.

== Notable Seydel harmonica players ==
- Pat Bergeson
- James Cotton
- Mark Hummel
- Aki Kumar
- Lazy Lester
- Charlie Musselwhite
- Sugar Ray Norcia
- Matthew Prozialeck
- Peter Madcat Ruth
- Frédéric Yonnet
- Bonny B.
Historical Seydel harmonicas

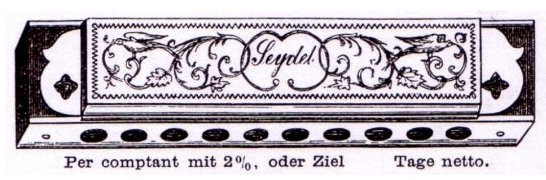
Seydel harmonica, 1880

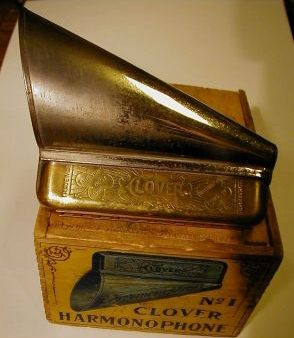
Clover

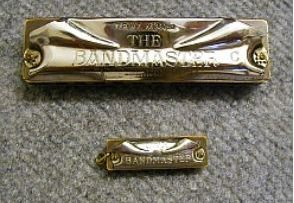
Bandmaster

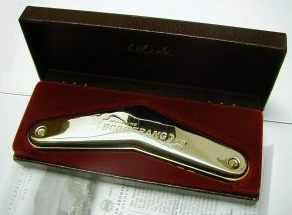
Boomerang - reconstruction
