= From the Cradle =

Studio album of cover songs by Eric Clapton
- Released: 12 September 1994
- Recorded: 1994
- Studios: Olympic Studios, Barnes, London
- Genres: Blues, electric blues, British blues, soul blues
- Length: 60:10
- Label: Duck / Reprise
- Producers: Eric Clapton, Russ Titelman

Eric Clapton chronology
Derek and the Dominos Live at the Fillmore (1994)	From the Cradle (1994)	The Cream of Clapton (1995)

Singles from From the Cradle
- 1. "Motherless Child" Released: 1994

From the Cradle is the twelfth solo studio album by Eric Clapton, released on 12 September 1994 by Reprise Records. A blues cover album and Clapton's follow-up to his successful 1992 live album, Unplugged, it is his only UK number-one album to date.

Although he had long been associated with the blues, From the Cradle was Clapton's first attempt at an all-blues album. He would subsequently record Riding with the King with B. B. King; a tribute to Robert Johnson, Me and Mr. Johnson; and a collaboration with J. J. Cale, The Road to Escondido.

== Title ==
The title comes from the last line of a four-line poem written by Clapton (and which he never set to music) and printed in his own handwriting on the second page of the CD booklet: "All along this path I tread / My heart betrays my weary head / with nothing but my love to save / from the cradle to the grave."

== Critical reception ==
Professional ratings
Review scores
Source	Rating
AllMusic	4.5/5 stars
Chicago Tribune	2.5/4 stars
Entertainment Weekly	B−
Los Angeles Times	3.5/4 stars
The Music Box	3/5 stars
Music Week	3/5 stars
People	(positive)
Robert Christgau	(2-star Honorable Mention)
The Penguin Guide to Blues Recordings	3.5/4 stars

From the Cradle has prompted a wide range of critical response. Stephen Thomas Erlewine of AllMusic feels that the album is almost perfect, with Clapton's guitar soloing "original and captivating". The weakness for him is Clapton's singing, which attempts to merely imitate the original singers, but is laboured or overly emotive, and falls short of the originals. Tom Sinclair of Entertainment Weekly felt that the recordings were "flawlessly faithful" but rather boring, especially compared with the inspiration evident in Cream's live version of "Spoonful". The Music Box's John Metzger felt that Clapton's appearance on Saturday Night Live to promote the record was more powerful than the album itself, which was a "perfunctory" performance lacking any originality. Robert Christgau compared Eric Clapton's work on the album to Son Seals and Otis Rush, saying that Clapton played better than the former, but sang worse than the latter and felt that "Motherless Child" and "Blues Before Sunrise" were stand-out tracks on the album.

According to the liner notes, the album was almost entirely recorded live in the studio with no overdubs or edits, the only overdubs being featured on "How Long Blues" (dobro) and "Motherless Child" (drums).

The album won Clapton the 1995 Grammy Award for Best Traditional Blues Album and he received a further nomination for Album of the Year.

In July 2014, Guitar World placed From the Cradle on their list "Superunknown: 50 Iconic Albums That Defined 1994".

== Track listing ==
1. "Blues Before Sunrise" (Leroy Carr) – 2:58 this version is inspired also by Elmore James's rendition of the song
2. "Third Degree" (Eddie Boyd, Willie Dixon) – 5:07
3. "Reconsider Baby" (Lowell Fulson) – 3:20
4. "Hoochie Coochie Man" (Dixon) – 3:16 originally performed by Muddy Waters
5. "Five Long Years" (Boyd) – 4:47
6. "I'm Tore Down" (Sonny Thompson) – 3:02 originally performed by Freddie King
7. "How Long Blues" (Carr) – 3:09
8. "Goin' Away Baby" (James A. Lane) – 4:00
9. "Blues Leave Me Alone" (Lane) – 3:36
10. "Sinner's Prayer" (Lloyd Glenn, Fulson) – 3:20
11. "Motherless Child" (Robert Hicks) – 2:57
12. "It Hurts Me Too" (Tampa Red) – 3:17 credited in the booklet to Elmore James, whose version was the blueprint for this one
13. "Someday After a While" (Freddy King, Thompson) – 4:27
14. "Standin' Round Crying" (McKinley Morganfield) – 3:39
15. "Driftin'" (Charles Brown, Johnny Moore, Eddie Williams) (Johnny Moore's Three Blazers) – 3:10
16. "Groaning the Blues" (Dixon) – 6:05 originally performed by Otis Rush

== Personnel ==
Musicians

- Eric Clapton – guitars, vocals
- Andy Fairweather Low – guitars
- Chris Stainton – keyboards
- Dave Bronze – bass
- Jim Keltner – drums
- Richie Hayward – percussion on "How Long Blues"
- Jerry Portnoy – harmonica
- The Kick Horns – horn arrangements
- Simon Clarke – baritone saxophone
- Tim Sanders – tenor saxophone
- Roddy Lorimer – trumpet

Production

- Producers – Eric Clapton and Russ Titelman
- Engineers – Alan Douglas (Tracks 1–6 & 8–16); Alex Haas (Track 7).
- Assistant Engineers – Giles Cowley and Julie Gardiner
- Mixing – Alan Douglas and Russ Titelman
- Mastered by Ted Jensen at Sterling Sound (New York, NY).
- Guitar Technician – Lee Dickson
- Equipment Technician – Ravi Sharman
- Project Coordinator – Mick Double
- Design – Wherefore Art?
- Cover Photography – Eric Clapton
- Photography – Jack English

== Charts ==
=== Weekly charts ===
Chart (1994–1996)	Peak position
Australian Albums (ARIA)	6
Austrian Albums (Ö3 Austria)	1
Belgian Albums (Ultratop Flanders)	24
Canada Top Albums/CDs (RPM)	2
Dutch Albums (Album Top 100)	3
European Albums (IFPI)	2
Finnish Albums (Suomen virallinen lista)	3
German Albums (Offizielle Top 100)	6
Hungarian Albums (MAHASZ)	22
Italian Albums (Musica e Dischi)	10
Japanese Albums (Oricon)	6
New Zealand Albums (RMNZ)	2
Norwegian Albums (VG-lista)	4
Portuguese Albums (AFP)	6
Scottish Albums (Official Charts)	7
Spanish Albums (AFYVE)	5
Swedish Albums (Sverigetopplistan)	2
Swiss Albums (Schweizer Hitparade)	1
UK Albums (Official Charts)	1
UK Jazz & Blues Albums (Official Charts)	1
US Billboard 200	1
US Top Blues Albums (Billboard)	1

=== Year-end charts ===
Chart (1994)	Peak position
Australian Albums (ARIA)	60
Austrian Albums (Ö3 Austria)	35
Canada Top Albums/CDs (RPM)	27
Dutch Albums (MegaCharts)	60
German Albums (Offizielle Top 100)	62
New Zealand Albums (RMNZ)	35
Swiss Albums (Schweizer Hitparade)	40
US Billboard 200	64

Chart (1995)	Peak position
US Billboard 200	65

== Certifications and sales ==
Certifications and sales for From the Cradle
Region	Certification	Certified units/sales
Argentina (CAPIF)	Gold	30,000^{^}
Australia (ARIA)	Platinum	70,000^{^}
Austria (IFPI Austria)	Gold	25,000^{*}
Brazil	—	250,000
France (SNEP)	2× Gold	200,000^{*}
Germany (BVMI)	Gold	250,000^{^}
Japan (RIAJ)	Platinum	400,000
New Zealand (RMNZ)	Platinum	15,000^{^}
Spain (Promusicae)	Platinum	100,000^{^}
Sweden (GLF)	Platinum	100,000^{^}
Switzerland (IFPI Switzerland)	Gold	25,000^{^}
United Kingdom (BPI)	Gold	100,000^{^}
United States (RIAA)	3× Platinum	3,000,000^{^}
Summaries
Europe (IFPI)	Platinum	1,000,000^{*}
^{*} Sales figures based on certification alone.^{^} Shipments figures based on certification alone.
