= Luke Jordan =

- The only known photograph of Luke Jordan. Lynchburg, 1940s

Background information
- Born: January 28, 1892 or November 1893; Lynchburg, Virginia or Bluefield, West Virginia or Appomattox County, Virginia, United States
- Died: June 25, 1952 (aged 58 or 60) Lynchburg, Virginia, United States
- Genres: Blues
- Instruments: Vocals; Guitar
- Years active: 1920s - 1939 or 1940s
- Label: Victor Records

Luke Jordan (January 28, 1892 or November 1893 – June 25, 1952) was an American blues guitarist and vocalist of some renown, particularly in the area of his home, in Lynchburg, Virginia.

== Biography ==
Sources conflict on Jordan's birthplace. Some sources list his birthplace as Appomattox County, Virginia, or Bluefield, West Virginia. According to his World War I draft registration card, Jordan was born in Lynchburg, Virginia. At the time of his registration on June 5, 1917, he was living in Bluefield and worked as a delivery boy and janitor. Jordan's gravestone mentions that he served in the "7th Development Battalion" during the war.

His professional career started at age 35, when he was noticed by Victor Records. He went to Charlotte, North Carolina in 1927 and made several records. The records sold moderately well, and Victor decided to take Jordan to New York in 1929 for two more sessions. He recorded few known tracks in his career. In comparison with the harsh voices of many contemporary Delta blues musicians, Jordan sang in a smooth and relaxed tenor. During the Great Depression, Jordan stayed in Lynchburg, and was often found playing by the Craddock Terry Shoe Company building. By the 1940s, Jordan had lost his voice, and had stopped singing.

According to a second draft registration card filled out on April 27, 1942 for World War II, Jordan was living in Lynchburg, and was unemployed. Jordan was known in his early years to be a cocaine addict, and later in life as a heavy alcoholic who was unable to hold down steady employment.

He died in Lynchburg in June 1952. His gravestone lies at Forest Hill Burial Park, in Lynchburg, Virginia.

His song "Church Bells Blues" was later recorded by Ralph Willis. It was also recorded by David Bromberg as a medley with Blind Willie McTell's "Statesboro Blues".

== Known recordings ==
=== Recorded August 16, 1927, Charlotte, North Carolina ===
- 39819-1. "Church Bells Blues." Victor unissued
- 39819-2. "Church Bells Blues." Vi 21076
- 39820-1. "Pick Poor Robin Clean." Victor unissued
- 39820-2. "Pick Poor Robin Clean." Vi 20957
- 39821-2. "Cocaine Blues." Vi 21076
- 39822-1. "Traveling Coon." Vi 20957

=== Recorded November 18, 1929, New York City ===
- 57703-1. "My Gal's Done Quit Me." Vi V38564
- 57704-3. "Won't You Be Kind?" Vi V38564

=== Recorded November 19, 1929, New York City ===
- 57705- . "If I Call You Mama." Vi 23400
- 57706-2. "Look Up, Look Down." Victor unissued
- 57707- . "Tom Brown Sits in His Prison Cell." Vi 23400
- 57708-2. "That's a Plenty." Victor unissued
