= Pick Poor Robin Clean =

Folk blues song

"Pick Poor Robin Clean" is a folk blues song. It was first recorded by Luke Jordan in 1927. It was also recorded by Geeshie Wiley and Elvie Thomas in 1930 and many other artists subsequently, often with variant lyrics.

== History ==
The origin of "Pick Poor Robin Clean" is unknown, but it existed as a folk song prior to its first recording. The use of racial slurs in older versions of the lyrics may indicate that the song comes from minstrel shows, although there is no documentation of its use in minstrelsy. Music historian Elijah Wald suggests some of the lyrics may have "been circulating in the oral tradition for generations".

The first known recordings of the song are by Piedmont blues singer Luke Jordan, who recorded two versions in August 1927. One of the two recordings was released as a single by Victor Records. The alternate version was later released on a 1970 compilation album, Travellin' This Lonesome Road: A Victor/Bluebird Anthology.

Geeshie Wiley and Elvie Thomas recorded it as a single for Paramount Records in March 1930. More recent artists recording the song include Larry Johnson for his 1970 album Fast and Funky, Koerner, Ray & Glover on their 1997 live album One Foot in the Grove, Erin Harpe for her 2002 album Blues Roots, and Tangleweed for their 2008 album Most Folk Heroes Started Out as Criminals.

== Lyrics and interpretation ==
The lyrics describe a person (the titular "poor Robin") whose possessions have been taken ("picked ... clean"), probably due to gambling losses or robbery. A "jaybird" (slang for a convict) laughs at the victim. The listener is warned to "get off my money and don't get funny" because the singer is a "hustling coon". Paul Oliver interprets the lyrics as accepting self-deprecating stereotypes, while Daphne Brooks describes them as embracing "brash tricksterism".

A verse recorded by Jordan, but omitted in many later versions, adds comments about the victim's family:

Now if you have that gal of mine, I'm gonna have your ma
Your sister too, your auntie three
If your great-grandmammy'll do the shivaree
I'm gonna have her four
I'll be satisfied, having the family

Wald describes this verse as "standard dozens material".

== In popular culture ==
In Ralph Ellison's 1952 novel Invisible Man, the protagonist recalls hearing the song and contemplates the applicability of the lyrics to his own circumstances.

In the 2025 movie Sinners, the main antagonists perform the song in an attempt to convince the Black owners of a juke joint that they should be allowed inside. The movie's soundtrack album includes a performance of the song by actors Jack O'Connell, Lola Kirke and Peter Dreimanis, as well as the earlier version by Wiley and Thomas.
