= Walter Prozialeck =

American biomedical educator and scientist

Walter C. Prozialeck
- Born: Johnstown, Pennsylvania
- Education: PhD
- Alma mater: Juniata College
- Known for: Medical Research
- Awards: American Osteopathic Foundation Educator of the Year Award 2010, American Osteopathic Association’s Korr Award 1999
- Scientific career
- Fields: Pharmacology
- Workplaces: Midwestern University, Philadelphia College of Osteopathic Medicine

Walter Charles Prozialeck (born August 18, 1952) is an American biomedical educator and scientist. He has written over 100 scientific papers and book chapters. He is known for his research on the toxicity of cadmium, as well as his research on psychoactive drugs and herbal medicine including marijuana and kratom, for which he was interviewed in Rolling Stone Magazine.

== Early life and education ==
Walter C. Prozialeck was born in Johnstown, Pennsylvania in 1952. He is the son of a coal miner, Bethlehem Steel worker Walter Prozialeck. He attended Forest Hills High School and was All-Conference in Football in 1969. He played guard and was a team captain. He received his undergraduate degree from Juniata College in 1974. Prozialeck earned his Ph.D. from Thomas Jefferson University in 1978 and did a postdoctoral fellowship in the laboratory of Benjamin Weiss from 1978 to 1980. He was associate professor at the Philadelphia College Of Osteopathic Medicine from 1980 to 1991.

== Career ==
Dr. Prozialeck relocated to Chicago in 1991. He joined the faculty at Midwestern University (then Chicago College of Osteopathic Medicine). In 1997 he was promoted to Chairman of the Department of Pharmacology at Midwestern University. In 1999 he was the inaugural recipient of the American Osteopathic Association's Korr Award for excellence in basic biomedical research. He was awarded the American Osteopathic Foundation Educator of the Year Award in 2010. He was named to Juniata College's Wall of fame and named a Distinguished Alumni. At Midwestern Prozialeck conducted research on the toxicity of cadmium. His research helped find early warning signs of kidney damage due to exposure to cadmium. In 2012 Prozialeck began being published about the controversial drug kratom. He opposed of the Drug Enforcement Administration's decision to classify the drug Schedule 1, saying that it would make research on the drug extremely difficult. Researchers stated it would potentially escalate the Opioid Crisis. He was interviewed in Rolling Stone along with several other researchers. The DEA eventually reversed its decision and handed control to the FDA.

== Personal life ==
He was a rugby player for 25 years and played Club Rugby while at Thomas Jefferson University. Dr. Prozialeck is the father of blues musician Matthew Prozialeck.
