= Sinners (soundtrack) =

Soundtrack and score to the 2025 film

Music for the 2025 period supernatural horror film Sinners is found on two albums both produced by Sony Music. The first, Sinners (Original Motion Picture Soundtrack), features known songs from various genres performed by blues musicians along with the cast members. The second album, Sinners (Original Motion Picture Score), contains the original score composed by Ludwig Göransson, director Ryan Coogler's frequent collaborator. Both albums were released under the Sony Masterworks and Sony Classical Records labels on April 18, 2025, the same day the film was released.

== Original soundtrack ==
Sinners (Original Motion Picture Soundtrack)

Soundtrack album by various artists
- Released: April 18, 2025
- Recorded: 2024–2025
- Studios: Royal Studios, Memphis, Tennessee; Esplanade Studio, New Orleans, Louisiana; Eastwood Scoring Stage, Warner Bros. Studios, Burbank, California; Elbo Studio, Los Angeles; Electric Lady Studios, New York City
- Genres: Jazz; Blues; R&B; Soul; Folk
- Length: 72:10
- Label: Sony Masterworks
- Producer: Ludwig Göransson

Singles from Sinners (Original Motion Picture Soundtrack)
- 1. "Sinners" Released: April 4, 2025

=== Background ===
Coogler's regular collaborator Ludwig Göransson worked on the soundtrack of Sinners. Göransson developed the soundscape from his experience with American blues music. His father was a blues aficionado, and they both listened to his recordings of blues musicians. His father also filmed concerts to share with his son. Göransson was also obsessed with Metallica during his early stages, which developed his musical interest and passion for guitar. When he read the script, he was impressed with Coogler's integration of music into the narrative, which "felt organic and unforced" – it was evident that "they were all interconnected with great intentionality".

For Sinners, Coogler and Göransson worked together on developing the music, with the former having played the guitar during the scriptwriting sessions while also being trained by Göransson on mastering the instruments. They felt challenged in making the music authentic to the movie's 1930's setting, with Göransson saying "What did it really sound like back then? How do we make the audience today feel like they’re hearing something fresh, yet true to the time?" The major problem was the fact that there are no great recordings of the 1930s, and film footages were lost. The remains of the music from that period are distorted in pitch, as well as hissing and scratching all over the records. However, as those recordings were captured live on stage, "it was this energy and atmosphere of live musical performances that we wanted to capture in the juke joint setting."

During the pre-production, Coogler sent Göransson several recordings from the 1930s and early 1940s, particularly the works of Robert Johnson and Tommy Johnson; much of the music had been integrated into the script, and consisted of music from various genres—blues, Irish folk, gospel, jazz and soul music—all of them were performed onscreen.

=== Production ===
Coogler and Göransson insisted on Ludwig's wife Serena Göransson producing the songs. As Serena was skeptical that they would be able to record them in studio and be able to visit New Orleans during weekends, they instead rented a house there and stayed for three months, writing the music. Serena Göransson, a classically-trained violinist, said that the southern Black music had to be handled with care and expert consultation, adding "I feel like a steward with this project [...] especially with the music. I just feel that it has a life of its own and the right artists are coming in to collaborate with us at the right time."

The couple worked with Lawrence "Boo" Mitchell, a blues producer who owns Royal Studios, visiting the B.B. King Museum and local juke joints in Clarksdale and Indianola with him for inspiration. They recorded the songs at Royal Studios for five days with Mitchell and musicians including Alvin Youngblood Hart and Cedric Burnside. Mitchell also worked with other blues musicians including Brittany Howard (the lead singer and guitarist of Alabama Shakes), Raphael Saadiq, Bobby Rush and Buddy Guy (who also starred in the film).

They rented a studio converted from a church in New Orleans and worked with the supporting cast Jack O'Connell, Lola Kirke, Peter Dreimanis and Jayme Lawson, rehearsing their songs multiple times. Much of the film was recorded live on set, with the cast members performing alongside other blues musicians. Hailee Steinfeld wrote and recorded the original song "Dangerous" for this film.

=== Release ===
Both the soundtrack and score to Sinners (produced and distributed by Warner Bros.) were released on Sony Music labels. That is unlike most Warner Bros. films, which are released on their in-house label WaterTower Music or record labels owned by Warner Music Group. The soundtrack was released through Sony Masterworks on April 18, 2025, the same day as the film, featuring 22 tracks performed by an array of blues musicians, alongside the cast members. The title song, performed by Rod Wave, was released as a single two weeks before the soundtrack and the score albums.

=== Reception ===
Brandon Zachary of Screen Rant wrote "Sinners boasts a very impressive soundtrack that matches the critical heights of the Ryan Coogler vampire film." Kambole Campbell of Little White Lies described it as a "typically inventive soundtrack from Ludwig Göransson". David Ehrlich of IndieWire wrote:

This isn't the first time that a Ludwig Göransson score has been inextricable from the texture of a Ryan Coogler movie, but Sinners opens with someone talking about a kind of music 'so pure it can pierce the veil between life and death, past and future' (a heavy gauntlet to drop at your composer’s feet!), and then proceeds to show us exactly what that sounds like. Twangy bass lines thick enough to saw down a redwood tree are shredded with shivers of electric guitar to create a blues sound that cuts a hole straight through the decades."

=== Track listing ===
No.	Title	Writer(s)	Artist(s)	Length
1.	"This Little Light of Mine"	Traditional	Miles Caton, DC6 Singers Collective and Pleasant Valley Youth Choir of New Orleans	2:25
2.	"Flames of Fortune"	Ludwig Göransson, Don Toliver	Ludwig Göransson and Don Toliver	3:51
3.	"Wang Dang Doodle"	Willie Dixon	Cedric Burnside, Sharde Thomas-Mallory and Tierinii Jackson	2:24
4.	"Travelin'"	Alvin Youngblood Hart	Miles Caton	1:34
5.	"Juke"	Little Walter	Bobby Rush and Miles Caton	1:11
6.	"Séance"	James Blake, Ludwig Göransson	James Blake and Ludwig Göransson	4:08
7.	"Dangerous"	Hailee Steinfeld, Sarah Aarons	Hailee Steinfeld	3:33
8.	"I Lied to You"	Ludwig Göransson, Raphael Saadiq	Miles Caton	5:14
9.	"Pick Poor Robin Clean"	Geeshie Wiley	Jack O'Connell, Lola Kirke and Peter Dreimanis	1:45
10.	"Can't Win for Losin'"	Cedric Burnside, Tierinii Jackson	Cedric Burnside and Tierinii Jackson	2:16
11.	"Old Corn Liquor"	Joe Thompson	Rhiannon Giddens and Justin Robinson	3:37
12.	"Will Ye Go, Lassie Go?"	Francis McPeake	Lola Kirke, Peter Dreimanis, Brian Dunphy, Darren Holden and Jack O'Connell	4:19
13.	"Pale, Pale Moon"	Brittany Howard, Ludwig Göransson	Jayme Lawson	4:45
14.	"Rocky Road to Dublin"	Traditional	Jack O'Connell, Brian Dunphy and Darren Holden	3:38
15.	"In Moonlight"	Jerry Cantrell, Ludwig Göransson	Jerry Cantrell and Ludwig Göransson	4:21
16.	"Travelin'"	Alvin Youngblood Hart	Buddy Guy	1:09
17.	"Last Time (I Seen the Sun)"	Alice Smith, Ludwig Göransson, Miles Caton	Alice Smith and Miles Caton	3:17
18.	"Sinners"	Rod Wave, Tarkan Kozluklu, Darius Poviliūnas, Kyris Mingo, Leonard Denisenko, Travis Harrington	Rod Wave	3:08
19.	"Troubled Waters / Homesick"	Ludwig Göransson, Noah Coogler, Noah Gorelick	OG DAYV and Uncle James	4:05
20.	"Pale, Pale Moon"	Brittany Howard, Ludwig Göransson	Brittany Howard	5:01
21.	"I Lied to You" (Radio Edit)	Ludwig Göransson, Raphael Saadiq	Miles Caton	2:54
22.	"Pick Poor Robin Clean"	Geeshie Wiley	Geeshie Wiley	3:12
Total length:				72:10

=== Charts ===
Chart performance for Sinners
Chart (2025–2026)	Peak position
Belgian Classical Albums (Ultratop Flanders)	3
UK Compilation Albums (Official Charts)	13
UK Jazz & Blues Albums (Official Charts)	5
UK Soundtrack Albums (Official Charts)	9
US Billboard 200	133
US Top Blues Albums (Billboard)	1
US Top Soundtracks (Billboard)	2

== Original score ==
Sinners (Original Motion Picture Score)

Film score by Ludwig Göransson
- Released: April 18, 2025
- Recorded: 2024–2025
- Studios: Royal Studios, Memphis, Tennessee; Esplanade Studio, New Orleans, Louisiana; Eastwood Scoring Stage, Warner Bros. Studios, Burbank, California; Elbo Studio, Los Angeles; Electric Lady Studios, New York City
- Genres: Film score; blues
- Length: 71:27
- Label: Sony Classical
- Producers: Ludwig Göransson; Serena Göransson (exec.)

Ludwig Göransson chronology
Oppenheimer (2023)	Sinners (2025)	The Mandalorian and Grogu (2026)

=== Background ===
Göransson described Sinners as a personal and ambitious score, reflecting his own musical journey. He drew inspiration from blues music and performed the score on a 1932 Dobro Cyclops resonator guitar, the same guitar Sammie Moore (Miles Caton) carries throughout the film. It was written at the sets as with the original songs. Göransson interlaced the underscore with the musical sequences featured in the film, which was considered to be challenging.

=== Release ===
The score album featuring 22 tracks was released under the Sony Classical Records label on April 18, 2025, the same day as the film.

=== Reception ===
The album received critical acclaim and won the Academy Award for Best Original Score. Mae Abdulbaki of Screen Rant stated "The music alone, from the songs played by the characters to the score by Ludwig Göransson, takes the film to another level. It's mesmerizing and expertly placed, effectively bringing the first and second half of the film together." Amy Nicholson of Los Angeles Times wrote "Ludwig Göransson's phenomenal score backs Coogler up, layering fiddles over doom metal as if they were meant to harmonize. This is music you've never heard and yet it seems to come from deep inside our pop-cultural soul, a symphony of violence for a country that looks at a violin case and imagines a Tommy gun." Kambole Campbell added "The multifaceted score begins with blues guitar playing as a base before subtly layering other styles of music over it." David Rooney of The Hollywood Reporter described it as a "flavorful [...] with the score and the blues performances fusing together to intoxicating effect." Zachary Barnes of The Wall Street Journal called Ludwig's score "a twangy marvel of genre-crossing interpolation."

=== Track listing ===
No.	Title	Length
1.	"Filídh, Fire Keepers and Griots"	2:32
2.	"Smokestack Twins"	3:29
3.	"Grace, Bo and Lil' Lisa"	3:44
4.	"(Delta) Slim's Patch"	4:01
5.	"Clarksdale Love"	3:23
6.	"Why You Here / Before the Sun Went Down"	3:40
7.	"Not What He Seems / Sé Abú"	2:46
8.	"Magic What We Do (Surreal Montage)"	3:45
9.	"Mount Bayou / Proper Black Folks"	3:26
10.	"She Said, "We?""	3:14
11.	"Playin' Games, Tellin' Ghost Stories"	4:17
12.	"Hole Up 'Til Sunrise"	3:31
13.	"Together Forever"	5:04
14.	"Thy Kingdom Come"	7:55
15.	"Bury That Guitar" (featuring Lars Ulrich)	3:20
16.	"Grand Closin'" (featuring Eric Gales)	4:05
17.	"Elijah" (featuring Eric Gales)	3:44
18.	"I've Seen Enough of This Place"	1:36
19.	"Free for a Day"	3:55
Total length:		71:27

=== Personnel ===
Credits adapted from Film Music Reporter:

- Music composer and producer: Ludwig Göransson
- Executive music producer: Serena Göransson
- Music programming: Ngawang Samphel, Noah Gorelick
- Musical arrangements: Vince Mendoza, Mamadou Sidibe, Iarla Ó Lionáird
- Technical score engineer: Max Sandler
- Music recording and mixing: Chris Fogel
- Digital recordist: Tom Hardisty
- Mix recordist: Evyn Deboer
- Music editor: Felipe Pacheco
- Score editors: Daniel Hayden, Eric Wegener
- ProTools operators: Larry Mah, Chandler Harrod
- Irish dialect coach: Tony Davoren
- Score coordinators: Queenie Li, Mei Rawlinson
- Music preparation: Fine Line Music Services
- Music consultants: Lawrence "Boo" Mitchell, Rhiannon Giddens, Iarla Ó Lionáird, Ingrid Monson, Jake Blount, Judith Finell, Sanchay Dharmic Jain, Charlie Yedor, Bruce Jackson
- Recording consultant: Riley Mackin
- Original score and songs recorded at:
  - Royal Studios, Memphis, Tennessee
  - Esplanade Studio, New Orleans, Louisiana
  - Eastwood Scoring Stage, Warner Bros. Studios, Burbank, California
  - Elbo Studio, Los Angeles
  - Electric Lady Studios, New York City

Featured musicians

- Resonator guitar: Miles Caton, Buddy Guy, Ludwig Göransson
- Electric guitar solos: Eric Gales, Christone "Kingfish" Ingram
- Early American banjo: Rhiannon Giddens
- Drums: Lars Ulrich, Cedric Burnside, Sharde Thomas Mallory, Chris Mallory
- Harmonica: Bobby Rush, Ross Garren
- Fife: Sharde Thomas Mallory, Chris Mallory
- Diddley bow: James "Super Chikan" Johnson
- Sean-nós vocals: Iarla Ó Lionáird
- Choctaw chanter: Jaeden Ariana Wesley
- Guitar: Alvin Youngblood Hart, Thomas Drayton, Charlie Bereal
- Djembe: Magette Sow
- Piano: Lester Snell, Victor Campbell, Tim Carmon
- Fiddle: Niamh Fahy, Justin Robinson, Charlie Bisharat
- Pennywhistle: Peter Dawson
- Banjo: Ludwig Göransson, Leyla McCalla, Sabine McCalla
- Bouzouki and bodhran: Tony Davoren
- Accordion: Jeffrey Broussard

Buddy Guy's band

- Performers: Cornelius Hall, Thomas Hambridge, Connor Korte, Charles Plakosh, Daniel Souvigney, Orlando Wright

DC6 Singers Collective

- Conductor: David Saul Lee
- Performers: Margaret Best Collins, Dedrick Bonner, Jantre Christian, Lavance Colley, Jyvonne Haskin, Brinn Horton, Joslynn James, Andre Kelly, Eric Lyn, Lakesha Shantrell Nugent, Ronnie Ohannon, Lydia Rene, Tia Simone, Loren Smith, William Washington

Pleasant Valley Youth Choir of New Orleans

- Conductor: Reginald Varnado, Jr.
- Performers: Victor Augustine IV, iana Bierria, Journie Elzy, Layle McCormick, Bailey Samuels, Brandon Samuels, Jr., Arden Varnado, Avery Williams, Demi Varnado, Tyler Williams

Incarcerated Workers

- Soloists: Carl LeBlanc, Dominique McClellan
- Performers: Derron Guillory, Jonriccas Harris, Zamond Herbert, Titus Joshua, Benjamin Osborne, Derek Raymond, Ariq Robinson, Bryant Spears, Kyron Walker, Reginald Williams

Orchestra

- Conductor: Anthony Parnther, Pete Anthony, Vince Mendoza
- Contractor: Encompass Music Partners, Boo Mitchell
- Orchestrations: Pete Anthony
- Concertmaster: Tereza Stanislav
- Principal second violin: Alyssa Park
- Principal viola: Rob Brophy
- Principal cello: Jacob Braun

=== Charts ===
Chart performance for Sinners (Original Motion Picture Score)
Chart (2025–2026)	Peak position
UK Album Downloads (Official Charts)	51
UK Jazz & Blues Albums (Official Charts)	11
UK Soundtrack Albums (Official Charts)	13
US Top Blues Albums (Billboard)	11
