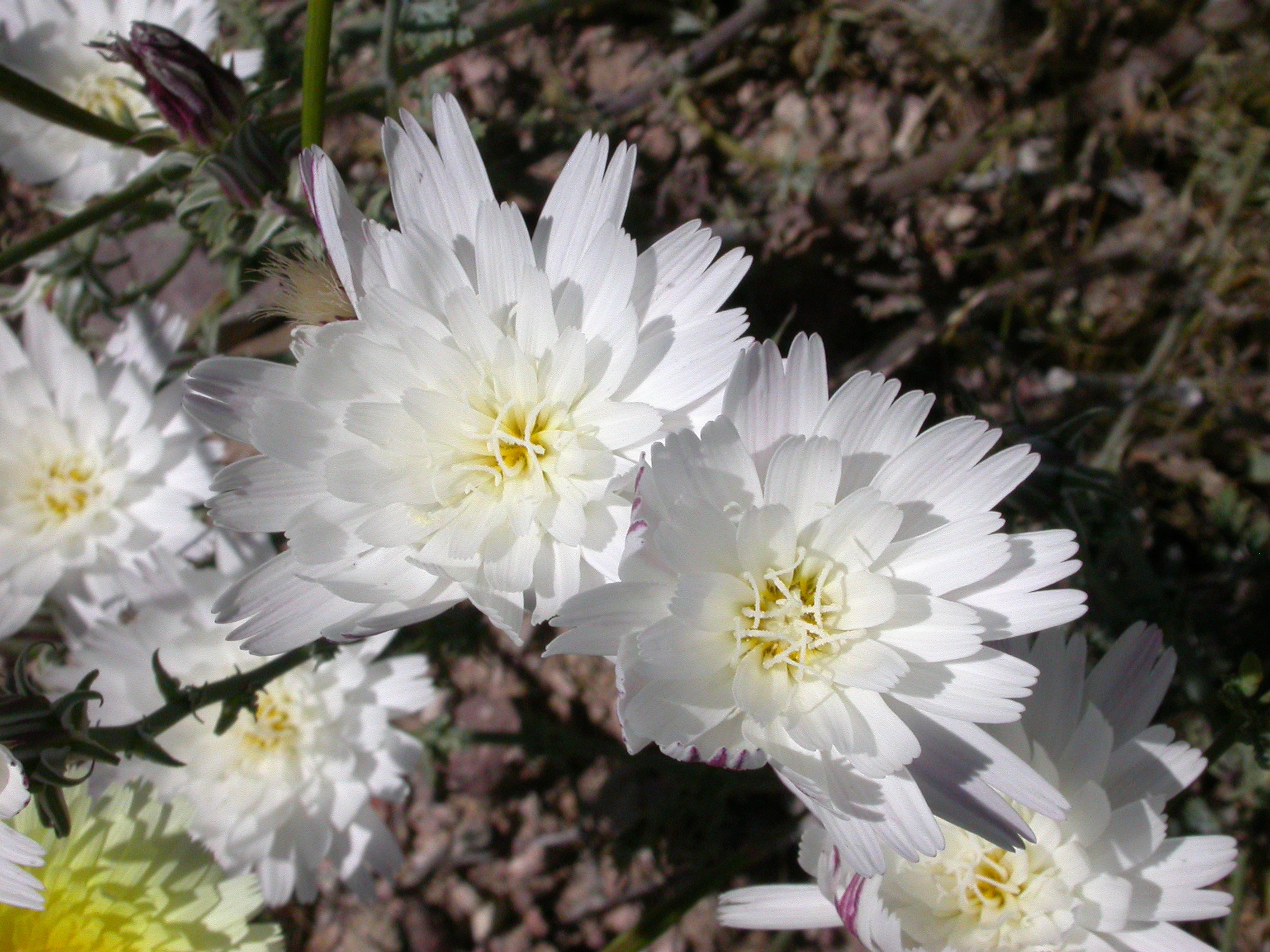
- Flowering plant near Amboy, California

Scientific classification
- Kingdom: Plantae
- Clade: Tracheophytes
- Clade: Angiosperms
- Clade: Eudicots
- Clade: Asterids
- Order: Asterales
- Family: Asteraceae
- Genus: Rafinesquia
- Species: R. neomexicana

Binomial name
- Rafinesquia neomexicana A.Gray

= Rafinesquia neomexicana =

Species of plant

Rafinesquia neomexicana is a species of flowering plant in the family Asteraceae. Common names include desert chicory, plumeseed, or New Mexico plumeseed. It has white showy flowers, milky sap, and weak, zigzag stems, that may grow up through other shrubs for support. It is an annual plant (completes its life cycle in a single season) found in dry climate areas of the southwestern deserts of the US and northwestern deserts of Mexico.

== Description ==
The annual plants are gray-green with sparse foliage and are between 15 and 50 centimetres (6 and 19 1/2 inches) high. Basal leaves are 5 to 20 cm (2 to 8 in) long and pinnate with narrow lobes while leaves further up the stem are smaller.

White flowerheads appear at the end of the stems between May and June in the species native range.

Flower heads occur singly at the tip of branches. The flower heads are composed of strap-shaped ray flowers, growing longer toward the outer portion of the head, and collectively creating the appearance of a single flower as in other sunflower family plants. The outer flowers in the head extend well beyond the 1.5–2.5 cm (1/2–1 in) long phyllaries (bracts enclosing the flower head before opening).

Similar species include R. californica and Calycoseris wrightii.

== Distribution and habitat ==
In the United States the species occurs in California, Nevada, Utah, Arizona, New Mexico and Texas. It occurs in the Mexican states of Baja California and Sonora.

It is found in the Mojave Desert, and in the Sonoran Deserts including the Colorado Desert sub-region.

It occurs in sandy or gravelly soils in creosote bush scrub and Joshua Tree woodland plant communities in the Mojave Desert and Sonoran Desert, from California to Texas and northern Mexico.
