= Shaker (David Johansen album) =

Studio album by David Johansen
- Released: May 28, 2002
- Genre: Country blues
- Label: Chesky Records
- Producer: David Chesky, Brian Koonin

David Johansen chronology
| David Johansen and the Harry Smiths (2000) | Shaker (2002) |

Professional ratings
Review scores
| Source | Rating |
|---|---|
| Allmusic | 4/5 stars |
| The Penguin Guide to Blues Recordings | 2.5/4 stars |

Shaker is the second and final album David Johansen recorded with the Harry Smiths. The album was released in 2002 by Chesky Records. The Harry Smiths personnel is the same as the band on the debut album, except for the drummer Keith Carlock, who replaced Joey Baron.

Shaker is the last album David Johansen released as a solo artist since reuniting and returning to the New York Dolls in 2004. He would pass away on February 28, 2025.

== Track listing ==
1. "Furry's Blues" (Furry Lewis)
2. "I'll Go with Her" (Robert Wilkins)
3. "Deep Blue Sea" (Tommy McClennan / Traditional)
4. "My Morphine" (David Rawlings, Gillian Welch)
5. "Ham Hound Crave" (Reverend Rubin Lacy)
6. "Let the Mermaids Flirt with Me" (Mississippi John Hurt)
7. "I Can't Be Satisfied" (Muddy Waters)
8. "In Love Again" (Memphis Minnie)
9. "Death Letter" (Son House)
10. "My Grandpa Is Old Too" (Lightnin' Hopkins)
11. "Jailbird Love Song"
12. "High Sheriff" (Charley Patton)
13. "Kassie Jones" (Furry Lewis)
14. "The Last Kind Words" (Geeshie Wiley)

== Personnel ==
- David Johansen - guitar, vocals, harmonica
- Larry Saltzman - banjo, guitar
- Kermit Driscoll - bass, didjeridu
- Brian Koonin - guitar, mandolin
- Keith Carlock - drums, percussion
