= John Jeremiah Sullivan =

American writer, editor and teacher

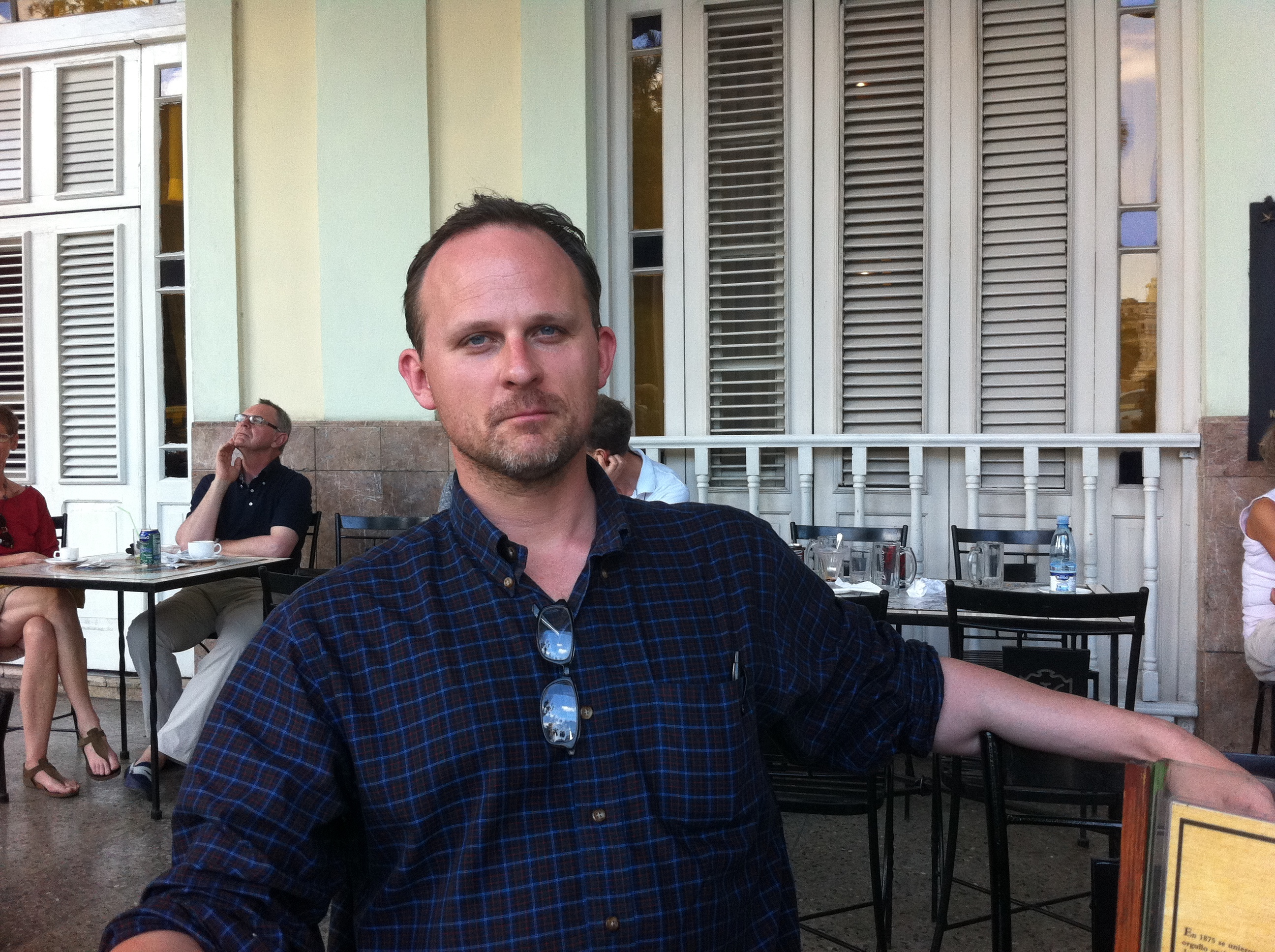
- Sullivan in 2012
- Born: 1974 (age 51–52); Louisville, Kentucky, U.S.
- Education: Sewanee: The University of the South
- Occupations: Writer; editor; teacher
- Spouse: Dr. Mariana Johnson
- Children: 2
- Writing career
- Period: 2003-present
- Genres: Literary journalism; essay; creative nonfiction

John Jeremiah Sullivan (born 1974) is an American writer, editor and teacher based in Wilmington, North Carolina. He is a contributing writer for The New York Times Magazine, a contributing editor of Harper's Magazine, and the southern editor of The Paris Review. In 2014, he edited that year's The Best American Essays, a collection in which his work has been featured in previous years. He has also served on the faculty of Columbia University, Sewanee: The University of the South, and other institutions. He is the co-founder of the non-profit research initiative Third Person Project.

== Early life and education ==
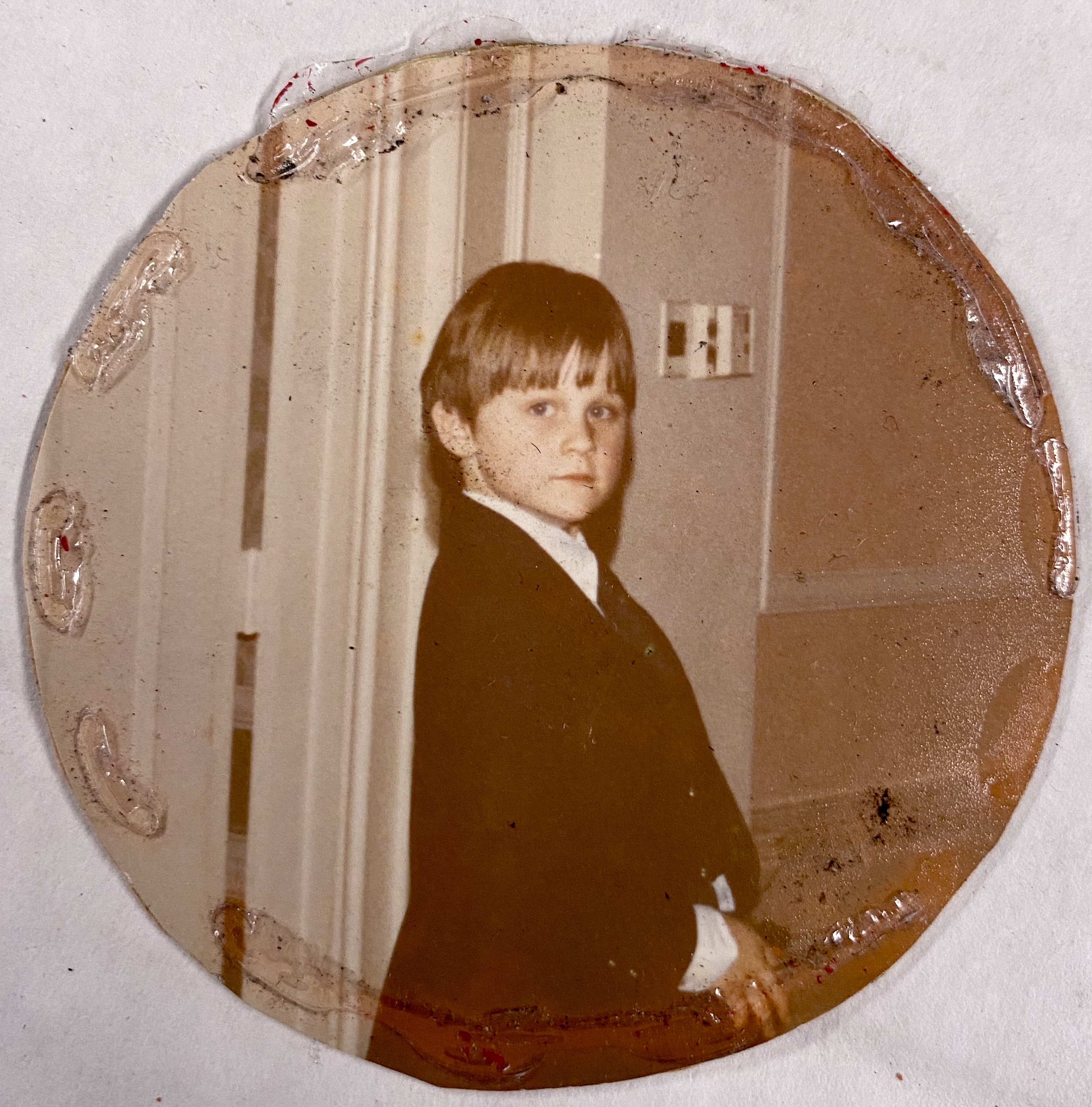
John Jeremiah Sullivan at 6 years old in Lexington, Kentucky

Sullivan was born in Louisville, Kentucky to Mike Sullivan, a sportswriter. His mother is an English professor. He earned his degree in 1997 from The University of the South, in Sewanee, Tennessee.

== Career ==
Sullivan's first book, Blood Horses: Notes of a Sportswriter's Son, was published in 2004. It is part personal reminiscence, part elegy for his father, and part investigation into the history and culture of the thoroughbred racehorse.

His second book, Pulphead (2011), is an anthology of fourteen previously published magazine articles, with most of them "in substantially different form" for the book.

Sullivan's essay "Mister Lytle", originally published in The Paris Review, won a number of awards, including a National Magazine Award, and was anthologized in Pulphead. Sullivan recounts how he lived with Andrew Nelson Lytle, when Lytle was in his 90s, helping him with house chores and learning some wisdom about writing and life.

His original music appears on the self-titled album Life of Saturdays.

In 2017, he helped lead a small group of 8th-grade students on a scavenger hunt to resurrect lost copies of The Daily Record, the African-American newspaper at the center of a white supremacist coup d'état and massacre that occurred in his adopted home town of Wilmington, NC, in 1898. He and his team located seven total copies, all of which are digitized and available for view via the N.C. Digital Heritage Project.

In 2019, the New Yorker published Sullivan's novella, "Mother Nut," on its website.

After being featured multiple times in the past and even editing an installment of The Best American Essays in 2014, Sullivan's essay "Corona" was featured in the 2025 essay collection edited by Jia Tolentino.

Sullivan is married to Dr. Mariana Johnson, a film scholar and professor. They have two daughters.

== Reception ==
In a 2025 interview American journalist Wright Thompson stated that his favorite piece of journalistic writing is Sullivan's "The Final Comeback of Axl Rose" (2006).

== Bibliography ==
=== Books ===
- Blood horses : notes of a sportswriter's son. New York: Farrar, Straus & Giroux. 2004.
- Pulphead: Essays, Farrar, Straus & Giroux, 2011.

=== Essays and reporting ===
GQ

- "Upon This Rock", on a visit to a Christian rock festival, 2004.
- "Good-Bye to All That", on a visit to the Gulf Coast, post-Hurricane Katrina, 2005.
- "The Final Comeback of Axl Rose", on Axl Rose, 2006.
- "Back in the Day", on Michael Jackson, 2009.
- "He Shall Be Levi", on a visit to Alaska, to meet Levi Johnston, 2009.
- "American Grotesque". on the Tea Party movement, 2010.
- "Violence of the Lambs". on the coming war between animals and humans, 2011.
- "Too Much Information", on David Foster Wallace, 2011.
- "The Last Wailer", on Bunny Wailer, 2011.
- "Peyton's Place". on living in the house used for the filming of One Tree Hill, 2011.
- "Rick Owens, Fashion's Lord of Darkness, is Still Out There" on Rick Owens, 2018.
- "Are I Peep?". on the death of Lil Peep, 2018.
- "Diddy Opens Up About Biggie's Death and the Secret Project He's Working on with Jay-Z". on Sean Combs, 2018.

The New Yorker

- "The Ill-Defined Plot," on the history of the essay, 2014.
- "David Foster Wallace's Perfect Game," 2014
- "Folk like us : Rhiannon Giddens and the evolving legacy of black string-band music". Profiles. The New Yorker. Vol. 95, no. 13. May 20, 2019. pp. 44–53.
- "Mother Nut," a novella, 2019.

Harper's Magazine

- "Horseman, Pass By: Glory, grief, and the race for the Triple Crown", 2003.
- "A Rawness of Seeing: Denis Johnson writes the big novel", 2007.
- "Unknown Bards: The blues becomes transparent about itself", included in Best Music Writing, 2009.
- "Man Called Fran", 2023.
- "Twain Dreams", on Mark Twain and Percival Everett's James, 2025.

New York Magazine

- "Art-Shaped Box", on Nirvana, 2004.
- "Dear Heather", on Leonard Cohen, 2004.
- "My Front Pages", on Bob Dylan, 2004.

The New York Times Magazine

- "You Blow My Mind. Hey, Mickey!", on Disney World, 2011.
- "How William Faulkner Tackled Race — and Freed the South From Itself" on William Faulkner, 2012.
- "Venus and Serena Against the World" on Venus Williams and Serena Williams, 2012.
- "Where is Cuba Going?", on Cuba's future, included in The Best American Travel Writing, 2013.
- "My Debt to Ireland" on Ireland's Future, 2012, included in The Best American Essays, 2013
- "The Ballad of Geeshie and Elvie", about blues singers Geeshie Wiley and Elvie Thomas, 2014.
- "‘Shuffle Along’ and the Lost History of Black Performance in America,” 2016.
- “How Prince Got His Name”, 2016.

The Paris Review

- “Guy Davenport, The Art of Fiction No. 174”, interview, 2002
- "Mister Lytle", an essay, 2010.
- "Unnamed Caves", on American cave art, 2011.
- “The Princes: A Reconstruction”, 2012
- Annette Gordon-Reed, The Art of Nonfiction No. 11, 2021
- "Uhtceare" (Sleep Stories), 2021

The Oxford American

- “That Don’t Get Him Back Again”, 2010
- “That Chop on the Upbeat”, 2013
- “Baby Boy Born Birthplace Blues”, 2016
- "Death Rattle", 2017

The Yale Review

- "Guest House", 2022

The Sewanee Review

- "Corona", 2024

Granta

- "The Acute Wing", fiction, 2026.

Sullivan has also written an introduction to a new edition of The Great Shark Hunt, an essay collection by Hunter S. Thompson.

== Awards ==
- 2003 Eclipse Award, Blood Horses
- 2003 National Magazine Award, Feature Writing
- 2004 Whiting Award, Nonfiction
- 2011 National Magazine Award, Essays and Criticism, "Mister Lytle. An Essay" (The Paris Review)
- 2011 Pushcart Prize, Pushcart XXXV, "Mister Lytle. An Essay" (The Paris Review)
- 2014 James Beard Foundation's MFK Fisher Distinguished Writing Award, for "I placed a Jar in Tennessee," published in Lucky Peach.
- 2015 ASCAP Foundation Taylor/Virgil Thomson Award
- 2015 Windham–Campbell Literature Prize (Non-Fiction) valued at $150,000
- 2016 Whiting Creative Nonfiction Grant, to complete The Prime Minister of Paradise
- 2018 Guggenheim Fellowship
