= William Moore (musician) =

American singer

- Also known as: Bill Moore
- Born: March 3, 1893; Dover, Georgia, U.S.
- Died: November 22, 1951 (aged 58) Warrenton, Virginia, U.S.
- Genres: Blues
- Occupation: Musician
- Instruments: Vocal; Guitar

William "Bill" Moore (March 3, 1893 – November 22, 1951) was an American blues singer and guitarist.

Moore was born in Dover, Georgia, and was raised in Tappahannock, Virginia. By 1917 he was working as a barber at South Amboy, New Jersey.

Described as "a facile, brilliant, and unusual guitarist", his style bridged ragtime and blues. He was the only Virginian country bluesman to record for Paramount Records, cutting sixteen sides for the label in 1928 in Chicago. His four 78-rpm records are sought by collectors and have been reissued on numerous LP and CD compilation albums. His songs (e.g., "Ragtime Millionaire", "Old Country Rock", "One Way Gal") have been covered by Lightnin' Wells, John Fahey, Stefan Grossman and Duck Baker, the Insect Trust and The Notting Hillbillies.

He died in Warrenton, Virginia.
