= Pulphead =

2011 essay collection by John Jeremiah Sullivan

- First edition
- Author: John Jeremiah Sullivan
- Language: English
- Genre: Essay Collection
- Publisher: Farrar, Straus and Giroux
- Publication date: 2011
- Publication place: United States
- Media type: Print Paperback
- Pages: 369 pp
- ISBN: 978-0-374-53290-1
- Dewey Decimal: 080—dc23

Pulphead is an essay collection by the American writer and editor John Jeremiah Sullivan. Pulphead has been named a 2011 New York Times Notable Book, a Time Magazine Top 10 Nonfiction Book of 2011, and one of Amazon's Best of the Month for November 2011.

Sullivan's essay "Mr. Lytle: An Essay," which recounts his time spent living with a then geriatric Andrew Nelson Lytle, won a 2011 National Magazine Award and a 2011 Pushcart Prize.

== Original Publishing Home of Pulphead Essays ==
The Paris Review

- "Mister Lytle", published in Pulphead as "Mr. Lytle: An Essay"
- "Unnamed Caves", on American cave art

GQ

- "The Last Wailer", on Bunny Wailer
- "Back in the Day", on Michael Jackson, published in Pulphead as "Michael"
- "The Final Comeback of Axl Rose", on Axl Rose
- "Upon This Rock", on a visit to a Christian rock festival
- "American Grotesque", on the Tea Party movement
- "Violence of the Lambs", on the coming war between animals and humans
- "Peyton's Place", on Sullivan's house being used as a filming location for the show One Tree Hill

Harper's Magazine

- "Unknown Bards", on the history of blues music.
