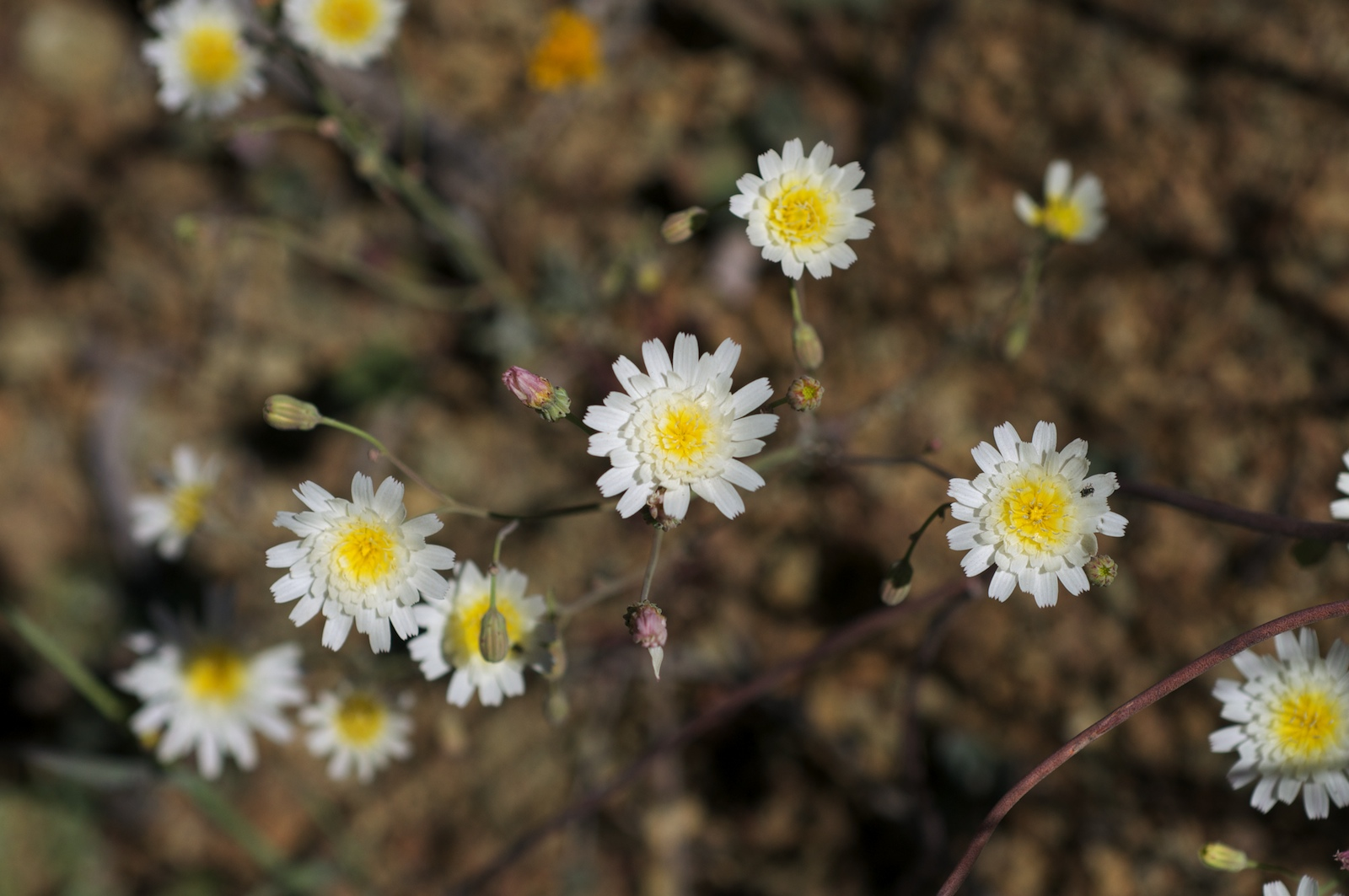

Scientific classification
- Kingdom: Plantae
- Clade: Tracheophytes
- Clade: Angiosperms
- Clade: Eudicots
- Clade: Asterids
- Order: Asterales
- Family: Asteraceae
- Genus: Rafinesquia
- Species: R. californica

Binomial name
- Rafinesquia californica Nutt.

= Rafinesquia californica =

Species of plant

Rafinesquia californica is a species of flowering plant in the family Asteraceae known by the common names California chicory and California plumeseed. It looks like a weedy daisy, bearing heads of elegant white-petaled flowers. The ligules of the flowers are often striped with lavender or pink on the undersides, a feature most noticeable when the heads are closed. Each fruit has a pappus of stiff white or light brown hairs.

It is among the first plants to sprout up in areas recently cleared by fire. Indeed, the seeds germinate more readily in the presence of burned wood. It is native to most of the southwestern United States as far north as Oregon, and to Baja California in Mexico.
