= Waterson (musician) =

- Origin: Glasgow, Scotland
- Genres: Electronica, House, Techno
- Occupations: Singer, songwriter, record producer, DJ, remixer, dancer
- Instruments: Vocals, piano, keyboards, programming, violin
- Years active: 2006–present
- Labels: Back To The World, Kartel Music Group, Notting Hill Music Group

Colin Waterson is a Scottish electronic musician.

== Biography ==
=== Career ===
Waterson's first release was an album of self-produced demos called 'Dada' in 2006. His breakthrough moment however, was with a song called 'Tell Me' almost a decade later, which saw him sign to UK producer Ashley Beedle's label 'Back To The World'.

'Tell Me' was released in 2015 scoring 10/10 and a No 1 position on the Love Vinyl chart as well as support from Radio 1, 1Xtra, Capital Xtra, Kiss, Rinse, KCRW and more. NYC house innovator, Kenny Dope, took such a shine to it, that as well as playing it on his Rinse FM for 12 weeks in a row, ended up remixing it.

Waterson is currently working with Ashley Beedle, KDA and Kryptogram on his debut full-length album.

== Discography ==
=== Selected singles ===
- "Strip Down" - (Junior Boys Own) (2009)
- "Paradise" - (Sinq Records) (2010)
- "Deep In Vogue" - (Basquiat Beats) (2013) No. 7 UK Dance Chart
- "Trouble" - (Basquiat Beats) (2014)
- "Ae Fond Kiss" - (Basquiat Beats) (2014)
- "Tell Me" - (Back To The World) (2016)

=== Other appearances ===
- Oxjam 2006 Festival Highlights (Oxjam/Pulse Rated) (2006)
- The Big Indie Comeback Vol 3 (Matchbox) (2007)
- Hotel Dubai - Mixed by Lisa Loud (Crazy Diamond) (2007)
- DJ Magazine Front Cover CD - Mixed by Kriss Darang & Jnr J (DJ Mag) (2007)
- CD Pool - July Club Mixes (CD Pool) (2008)
- Promo Only - Hot UK Club Tracks (promo) (2008)
- MixMag Front Cover CD - Mixed by Smokin' Jo from Space, Ibiza (MixMag) (2008)
- Kinky Ibiza Bangers - (Kinky Malinki) (2008)
- Club Tracks 11 - (V-Pressure) (2008)
- Jonny Trunk Presents... - (Trunk Records) (2008)
- Just Minimal Tech House - (Open Bar Music) (2008)
- Oxyd Records MIDEM Sampler - (Oxyd records) (2010)
- Axis Trax vs Rachel Ellektra - (Axis Trax) (2010)
- Oxyd City Volume 1 - (Oxyd City Records) (2010)
- Five Takes (A Song About Andy) with Billie Ray Martin – (Disco Activisto) (2012)
- Off The Rails with Billie Ray Martin & Aerea Negrot – (Disco Activisto) (2013)
- Mi-Soul Album - (Mi-Soul Records) (2014)
- MITRA for Nepal - (Sub Culture Records) (2015)
- Ibiza 2016 - (Toolroom Records) (2016)
- Future Disco Presents: Poolside Sounds Vol 5 - (Needwant Records) (2016)
