= Elvie Thomas =

American country blues singer-songwriter

- Also known as: Elvie Slack
- Born: L. V. Grant; August 7, 1891; Houston, Texas, U.S.
- Died: May 20, 1979 (aged 87) Houston, Texas, U.S.
- Genres: Blues, country blues
- Occupations: Singer, songwriter
- Instrument: Guitar
- Years active: 1908–1937
- Label: Paramount

L.V. Thomas (née L.V. Grant, August 7, 1891 – May 20, 1979), better known as Elvie Thomas, was an American country blues singer and guitarist from Houston, Texas.

== Name ==
Thomas's now most well-known designation "Elvie" is a corruption of L.V., used only by Paramount Records. Her fellow musicians addressed her simply as "Slack", which is spoken in the introduction of "Pick Poor Robin Clean". Later in life, her fellow parishioners knew her as "Mama Thomas" or "Sister L.V. Thomas." When Thomas was called L.V., the V was accented.

== Life ==
Thomas left school after the fifth grade and began playing guitar at the age of 11 (1902). She began performing at "country suppers" when she was 17. During the 1920s and 1930s, she performed with Texas Alexander, Leon Benton and Leroy Johnson.

She recorded two songs issued by Paramount Records, "Motherless Child Blues" and "Over to My House", with Geeshie Wiley on second guitar, in March 1930. The two also recorded a duet "Pick Poor Robin Clean". All of Thomas' and/or Wiley's known recordings were made during these same 1930 sessions for Paramount Records, in Wisconsin. Thomas backed Wiley on the three other tracks, playing second guitar on Wiley's "Last Kind Words Blues", "Skinny Leg Blues", and "Eagles on a Half".

Her recordings for Paramount in 1930 were labeled "Elvie Thomas". In an interview with blues researcher Robert "Mack" McCormick, she said of her name, "It's just the letters L. V., . . . that's all the name I got, but he (Paramount representative Arthur Laibly or pressing foreman Alfred Schultz) made it out 'Elvie' someway."

During lengthy periods between 1920 and 1967, Thomas is known to have dressed in men's clothing and lived with a woman named Sarah Goodman Cephus.

In her later years, Thomas sang in the choir at the Mount Pleasant Baptist Church in Acres Homes, a suburb of Houston.
