= Little Village Foundation =

American non-profit organization

The Little Village Foundation was founded in 2014 by Jim Pugh as a 501(c)(3) organization based in Solvang, California. Pugh is a veteran keyboard player who has toured the world with Robert Cray and Etta James (see Stickin' to My Guns). Little Village Foundation (LVF) is non-profit company in the music industry that produces and distributes what it considers to be culturally significant recordings made by individuals and groups that might otherwise not be heard beyond the artists' community or family. The label serves an access point for previously overlooked artists who retain their intellectual property and album sales through their work with the organization. The artists come from widely varied and sometimes non-traditional backgrounds. Pugh and his find and secure talent to sign and record, and several of the musicians have roots that extend to other nations, including Mexico, India, Russia and the Philippines.

== Discography ==
LVF released its batch of four CDs in 2015. Four more followed in 2016, and seven more have followed in both 2017 and 2018. Most are released in the summer to coincide with an artists' showcase on Fourth Of July weekend at the Waterfront Blues Festival in Portland, Oregon.

=== 2015 releases ===
- David Ellis With Any Luck But Bad (western/folk musician from Bakersfield, California)
- Los Tres Amigos Snuviko's When the Clouds Descend (musicians from Santa Maria, California, who sing and play in the Mixtec language of their native Oaxaca, Mexico)
- Ron Thompson's Son Of Boogie Woogie (Oakland, California, bluesman)
- Wee Willie Walker's If Nothing Ever Changes (Memphis-born soul-blues artist based in Minneapolis, Minnesota)

=== 2016 releases ===
- John "Blues" Boyd's The Real Deal (Mississippi-born San Francisco-area bluesman)
- Aireene Espiritu's Back Where I Belong (Filipino-American Californian who sings some tunes in Tagalog)
- Aki Kumar's Aki Goes To Bollywood (Bay Area–based blues harmonica player from Mumbai, India, who sings in Hindi)
- Mariachi Mestizo's Te Doy La Libertad (16 high school students from Delano, California)
- Wee Willie Walker's Live! Notodden Blues Festival Norway (October release)

=== 2017 releases ===
- Sean Wheeler's Sand In My Blood (Salton Sea Legend of The Desert)
- Chris Cain's Chris Cain (San Jose, California, born blues multi-instrumentalist)
- Xochtil Morales' Descansos (LVF's first spoken-word album – the poetry of a member of Mariachi Mestizo)
- The Sons Of The Soul Revivers' Live! Rancho Nicasio (traditional gospel quartet singing)
- Maurice Tani's The Lovers Card (alt-country artist from San Francisco)
- Paul deLay's 1997 Live At Notodden (blues)
- Howell Devine's HOWL (Bay Area country blues and jazz)

=== 2018 releases ===
- Ada Pasternak's Sweet Dreams (Violinist and singer-songwriter – recorded with and a tribute to her parents Rayhan and Igor, with whom she migrated to the U.S. from her native Russia)
- Aki Kumar's Hindi Man Blues (A fusion of blues and Bollywood with liner notes from blues harmonica player Charlie Musselwhite)
- Kevin Burt's Heartland And Soul (Debut recording from Iowa-based guitarist/harmonica player who captured top honors in three categories at the 2018 International Blues Challenge)
- Marcel Smith's' Everybody Needs Love (Debut solo album from veteran gospel vocalist)
- Mariachi Mestizo's XX Aniversario (Mariachi follow-up to 2016 debut album)
- United By Music North America's Yes We Can Can (blues, swing, jazz and rock-'n'-roll performed by professionals and musicians with autism and other developmental disabilities they mentor through their international non-profit organization)
- Various Artists Raise Your Voice (Collection of music and spoken-word pieces about school safety delivered by survivors of the Marjory Stoneman Douglas High School massacre in Parkland, Florida, and others from other parts of the U.S., including the following songs/works by the following high school students: "Shine", by Sawyer Garrity and Andrea Peña; "Raise Your Voice", by Madison Yearsley; "Save Me", by Tyler Jenkins; "A Poem for the Fallen", spoken word by Saida Dahir; "Renegades", by Amalia Fleming; "The Truth: We Need Change", by the AP Music Class from John W. Lavelle Preparatory Charter School; "17", by Ben Soto; "The Separation", by Ashlyn Flamer and Christopher Doleman; "Little Princess", by Tyler Suarez; "Freedom", by Nina Lee; and "We Can", by students from St. Paul High School for the Performing Arts)
- Whitney Shay's A Woman Rules The World (San Diego–based blues vocalist)

=== 2019 releases ===
- Anai Adina's Esperame En El Cielo (Harvard-bound multi-instrumentalist daughter of mariachi stars Leticia and Juan Morales)
- Betty Reid Soskin's A Life of Being Betty (Spoken-word account of the African-American experience as seen through the eyes of America's oldest active Park Ranger)
- Junior Watson's Nothin' to Do But to Do It (Jump blues from guitarist who has worked and recorded with Canned Heat, Rod Piazza, Big Mama Thornton, George "Harmonica" Smith, Charlie Musselwhite, Jimmy Rogers, Pee Wee Crayton, and many more)
- Marina Crouse's Never Too Soon (Bay Area Mexican-American blues, R&B and jazz vocalist)
- Maurice Tani's This Is It (Alt-country artist recorded live at the Freight & Salvage Coffeehouse in Berkeley, California)
- Mary Flower's Livin' with the Blues Again (Piedmont and lap steel stylings from Oregon-based singer/songwriter)
- The Mike Duke Project's ...Took a While (Debut Southern soul release from pianist/songwriter who penned major hits for Huey Lewis & the News in the 1980s and was a longtime member of the Delbert McClinton Band)
- Saida Zahir's The Walking Stereotype (Poetry from 18-year-old Somali refugee now living in Salt Lake City, Utah, with guest appearances from R&B bassist Jerry Jemmott and Tonight Show Band percussionist Vicki Randle)
- Skip The Needle's We Ain't Never Going Back (Debut release from all-female R&B band founded in Oakland, California, in 2014 and anchored by Randle)

=== 2020 releases ===
- Casey Van Beek and the Tulsa Groove's Heaven Forever (Dutch-born, Los Angeles-raised 1960s rocker and former Grammy nominee with the country-rock band The Tractors delivers a mix of blues, country and rockabilly in a style known as the Tulsa Sound.)
- Ron Thompson's From the Patio: Live at the Poor House Vol. 1 (recorded in San Jose, California, in 2014 and released as a tribute a few months after Thompson's death due to complications of diabetes.)
- The Sons Of The Soul Revivers' Songs We'll Always Sing (The second Little Village release from the quartet, which bridges gospel, soul and early rock 'n' roll.)
- Nic Clark's Love Your Life: Songs for the Whole Family (Debut release for Colorado-born, Bay Area–based singer/songwriter/multi-instrumentalist featuring contributions from longtime Little Richard drummer Derrick Martin and Atlantic Records session bassist Jerry Jemmott.)
- Sonny Green's Found! One Soul Singer (Best-known for the song "Jody's on the Run", this Los Angeles–based, Louisiana-bred has been singing contemporary Southern soul music since the late 1960s.)
- 20x20: The LVF Singer Songwriter Compilation (20 artists in multiple fields contributed one song each to this collection. All of the material was recorded at home during the COVID-19 crisis with minimal backing. The roster includes Aireene Espiritu, Alabama Mike, Be Steadwell, David Jackson, Genesis Fermin, Ira Marlowe, John Arthur Bigham, Jim Bruno, Joe Rut, Kofy Brown, Lisa Leuschner Andersen, Margaret Belton, Marina Crouse, Maurice Tani, Nic Clark, Rachel Garlin, Sean Wheeler, Roger McNamee, Vicki Randle and Wendy Beckerman.)

=== 2021 releases ===
- Aaron Lington's 4 Bari x Bach (San Jose State University professor/coordinator of jazz studies reinterprets Bach chorales on baritone saxophone)
- Aki Kumar's Zindagi: Live It Your Way (Single, blues release with Bollywood overtones)
- Gary Vogensen's Shot of Hope (Bay Area singer-songwriter's first solo release in 19 years. A former member of Angela Strehli's band, Blues Broads, he has been a touring musician for 40 years in a career that has included work with Commander Cody and the Lost Planet Airmen, Boz Scaggs, Steve Miller, Lloyd Price and more.)
- Tia Carroll's You Gotta Have It (First U.S. release for Bay Area blues, rock and gospel singer)
- Bobby Black's 70 Years of Swingin' Steel! (Retrospective from the pedal steel guitarist who was a longtime member of Commander Cody & the Lost Planet Airmen, Asleep at the Wheel and New Riders of the Purple Sage.)
- Memphissippi Sound's Welcome to the Land (All-original debut release of duo formed by harmonica player Damion Pearson and percussionist Cameron Kimbrough.)

=== 2022 releases ===
- Diunna Greenleaf's I Ain't Playin (2014 Blues Music Association Koko Taylor Award winner as female vocalist of the year returns to the studio for her first new solo release in 11 years.)
- Henry Kaiser and Rome Yamilov's The Lenoir Investigation (San Francisco–based ethnomusicologist/guitarist Kaiser teams with Russian-born Yamilov to re-imagine the music of the bluesman J.B. Lenoir.)
- Marina Crouse's Canto de Mi Corazon (Spanish-language release from fourth-generation Mexican-American Bay Area vocalist who revisits songs she heard as a youth.)
- Mighty Mike Schermer's Just Gettin' Good (Former Marcia Ball, Bonnie Raitt and Elvin Bishop guitarist delivers an original set of Texas and West Coast blues.)
- DaShawn Hickman's Drums, Roots & Steel (Debut album from a steel guitarist based out of Mt. Airy, North Carolina, delivering music culled from traditional Pentecostal-Holiness churches.)
- Phantom Blues Band's Blues for Breakfast (The fifth release under their own name for the group who have served as Taj Mahal's backing band since the 1990s. Composed of first-call sidemen, the lineup includes guitarist Johnny Lee Schell, bassist Larry Fulcher, percussionist Tony Braunagel, and horn players Joe Sublett and Darrell Leonard. Bonnie Raitt and Curtis Salgado make guest appearances with proceeds targeted for donation to the Mike Finnigan School of Music in Salina, Kansas, in honor of their keyboard player who succumbed to cancer prior to the release of this CD.)
- Maurice Tani's All In (Singer/songwriter teams with several LVF label mates and delivers an all-original set of tunes with linear storylines that include alternative country to R&B and roots.)

=== 2023 releases ===
- Alabama Mike's Stuff I've Been Through (All-original set of Southern soul, R&B, funk and blues from Alabama-born, Bay Area–based vocalist born Michael Benjamin.)
- Nic Clark's Everybody's Buddy (An all-original, sophomore release from Colorado-based, Mexican-American multi-instrumentalist describes the trials and tribulations of growing up in Generation Z. It was produced by guitarist Charlie Hunter in Greensboro, North Carolina.)
- D.K. Harrell's The Right Man (The debut release from Rustin, Alabama–based guitarist who finished third in the 2022 International Blues Challenge.)
- Candice Ivory's When the Levee Breaks: The Music of Memphis Minnie (Tennessee-born vocalist reimagines 12 tunes made famous by one of the earliest female stars in the blues.)
- Marcel Smith's From My Soul (Gospel- and R&B-infused sophomore release from veteran West Coast vocalist.)
- Bobby Vega's What Cha Got (An instrumental offering from bassist whose career includes work with Sly & the Family Stone, Paul Butterfield, Etta James and many others.)
- Jeff Sanford's Cartoon Jazz Orchestra's Playland at the Beach (New York City-born clarinet's ensemble performs material culled from the Looney Tunes cartoons catalog.)
- The Sampaguitas' The Sampaguitas: Folk Songs from the Philippines & Beyond (Aireene Espiritu, Jenevieve Francisco and Cristina Ibarra mix originals and more in this love song for the island nation.)
- Skip the Needle's Octavia of Earth Vol. 2: Inspired by the Life of Octavia E. Butler (Oakland-based female quartet's documentary/musical about the life of the founder of Afrofuturism.)

=== 2024 releases ===
- J.P. Soars' Brick by Brick (A South Florida resident who won the 2009 International Blues Challenge, Soars set includes appearances from fiddler Anne Harris, vocalist Annika Chambers, guitarist Paul DesLauriers and saxophonist Terry Hanck.)
- Kid Andersen and Lisa "Little Baby" Andersen's Spirits/Soul (Two-CD release from the perennial Blues Music Award nominee guitarist/producer and his vocalist wife, a former child star and American Idol contestant who has enjoyed a successful career on stage and appeared in a support role on more than 50 albums in the past decade. The first disc features Kid Andersen with guest appearances from Charlie Musselwhite and others, while Lisa's album includes contributions from Latimore and more.)
- Billy Price's Person of Interest (The former lead singer for Roy Buchanan, Price has been releasing award-winning albums since the early 1980s, and he teams with producer Tony Braunagel.)
- Curtis Salgado's Fine By Me (One of the most decorated soul-blues artists of his generation, Delgado takes his vocal stylings and songwriting talent in a new direction.)
- Jubu Smith's Jubu (His professional career began at age of 19 in Oakland, California, with a ten-year run with childhood friends Tony! Toni! Tone!, includes stints with Whitney Houston, Frankie Beverley & Maze and recording with many of the biggest names of R&B. Eric Gales guests on one cut.
- Mighty Mike Schermer's The Legend of Michael Ray Pickens and His Old Man Country Band (A guitarist/vocalist whose career has enjoyed long stints with Elvin Bishop, Charlie Musselwhite, Marcia Ball, Bonnie Raitt, Maria Muldaur, Howard Tate and others, Schermer pays tribute to George Jones, Ray Price, Hank Williams and the founders of traditional country music on this disc, which is delivered in old-school fashion with contemporary appeal.)

=== 2025 releases ===
- Mariachi Mestizo's XXV Anniversario (Composed of a rotating lineup of seventh- through twelfth-grade students, the California-based ensemble has been delivering mariachi to the world since 2000. And they celebrate their 25th anniversary with this set.)
- Skip the Needle's Wake Up Wake Up Wake Up (The West Coast is alive with the sounds of New Orleans thanks to the diaspora of people who've relocated from the Gulf Coast. And this nine-member ensemble keeps the music alive here with a musical roux common to the Big Easy.)
- Terry Hanck's Grease to Gravy (Award-winning saxophone player delivers a fiery blend of soul, blues, rock and New Orleans second-line funk.)
- Aki Kumar's God Bless the USA (The Indian-born harmonica wizard fulfills a lifelong dream with this self-produced and self-engineered CD with backing from several members of the Bay Area blues scene.)
- All Things Swamp (The San Francisco Bay is a magnet for musicians who've relocated from New Orleans, and the Gulf Coast sound percolates throughout his set thanks to the 11-member group of California musicians who bill themselves as All Things Swamp.)
- Barry Goldberg's Like I Said (A posthumus tribute to the keyboard legend, Goldberg recorded this digital download with the help of guitarist Johnny Lee Schell while in hospice care only a few weeks before he passed in January 2025. All proceeds are earmarked to care for Goldberg's widow, Gail.)
- Jeff Falconer's Many Miles to Go (A performing musician and recording artist for most of his life, songwriter Jeff delivers a collection of his eclectic originals with backing from first-call Northern California session players and several guest artists, too.)
- Sean "Mack" McDonald's Have Mercy! (A 22-year-old recent college graduate from Augusta, Ga., Sean's a dynamic vocalist/guitarist with a modern approach, an encyclopedic knowledge of blues stylings and old-school sensibilities. He makes his recording debut with an album that's soulful one moment and deep blue the next.)
- Nia Cephas' Cosmicpolitan (Southern California-born, Oakland based singer/songwriter takes listeners on a multicultural journey that encompasses bossa nova, samba, Middle Eastern folk, reggae, pop, jazz and blues.)
- Kyle Rowland's Not Holding Back (Based out of Sacramento, Calif., harmonica player/multi-instrumentalist Kyle Rowland makes his recording debut with an album that mixes Southern soul, country blues and more.)

=== 2026 releases ===
- Harrell Davenport's Young Rell (Just 19 years old, but already a major, rising star in the blues, the Mississippi-born, harmonica-and-guitar-playing vocalist makes his recording debut in this set, which was captured in a full-band setting by Kid Andersen at Greaseland Studios in California.)
- Lo Steele's Only a Drop (Female artist from Portland, Ore., blends R&B, gospel and blues as she delivers an intimate, rhythmic and emotion-packed album in collaboration with Charlie Hunter and Marcus Finnie.)
- Mary Flower and Leon Cotter's Chains of Rain (An acclaimed fingerpicking guitarist, Mary Flower teams with California Honeydrops' clarinetist Leon Cotter for an all-original release delivered in the roots blues, ragtime and early jazz tradition.)
- Terry Haggerty's Family (The guitarist in the '60s San Francisco-based supergroup Sons of Champlin, Haggerty pays tribute to his parents -- a father who played guitar with Kid Ory and Louis Armstrong and mother who was a Cuban percussionist and dancer -- with all-original set of spiritually influenced R&B.)
- Dublineque (The eponymous debut release from an Irish music band formed with other adults by Dublin-born Eamonn Flynn while he was teaching a music course to children at the Irish Center in San Francisco.)

=== Awards ===
- 2025 Blues Music Awards winners: album /soul blues album/vocalist and male artist of the year -- Curtis Salgado's Fine By Me and band of the year -- Rick Estrin & the Nightcats. Additional nominees included Billy Price (vocalist and album Person of Interest), Chris Cain's "Blues for My Dad" and Kevin Burt and Jerry Jemmott's "Mama, I Love You" (song), Cain's Good Intentions Gone Bad and Estrin's The Hits Keep Coming (contemporary album), Price's Person of Interest (soul blues album), Kevin Burt (acoustic artist), Cain (male artist), Estin (entertainer and harmonica), Candace Ivory (soul blues female), Alabama Mike and Billy Price (soul blues male and vocalist), Diunna Greenleaf (traditional female), Jermmott (bass), Derrick "D'Mar" Martin, June Core and Tony Braunagel (drums) and Cain and Christoffer "Kid" Andersen (guitar).
- 2025 Spelleman Prisen -- Norway's equivalent to the U.S. Grammy: Kid Andersen and Lisa Andersen for their two-disc soul CD Spirits/Soul
- 2026 Blues Music Awards winners: D.K. Harrell's Talkin' Heavy (album/contemporary album of the year), Kevin Burt (acoustic artist), Sean McDonald (best emerging artist album), Tommy Castro and Christoffer "Kid" Andersen's "Can't Catch a Break" (song) and Derreck "D'Mar" Martin (drummer). Additional nominees included Rick Estrin (entertainer of the year), McDonald and Kyle Rowland (emerging artist), Harrell and Chris Cain (contemporary male artist), Cain (guitarist) and Candace Ivory (soul blues female).

=== Notable events ===
Following the release of their album, Mariachi Mestizo was invited to play in a showcase at Carnegie Hall in New York. The performance took place on April 10, 2017. The group also performed at New York's Lincoln Center in 2018.

Formed a partnership in 2020 with Arhoolie Foundation, the non-profit that continues the mission of Chris Strachwitz and his Arhoolie Records, joining to co-produce "Working from Home", a series of concerts that provide a revenue stream for artists across the U.S. who are housebound because of coronavirus and unable to perform elsewhere. The shows are recorded and broadcast via social media with viewers contributing to virtual tip jars for each performance. All monies raised go directly to the artists involved, and LVF and Arhoolie provide matching funds for the first $500 raised per show. Ten shows were recorded in the series in 2020 to 2021, including broadcasts from Seligstein and Horowitz of Veretski Pass, Casey Van Beek and the Delta Groove, John "Blues" Boyd, Aki Kumar and Rome Yamilov, Wilson Savoy, Mary Flower, Familia Longoria, The Sons of the Soul Revivers, Xochitl and Anai Morales, and C.J. Chenier.
