= Trouble in Mind (Mance Lipscomb album) =

Studio album by Mance Lipscomb
- Released: 1961
- Recorded: 1960
- Label: Reprise
- Producer: Chris Strachwitz, Mack McCormick

Mance Lipscomb chronology
| Texas Songster (1960) | Trouble in Mind (1961) | You Got to Reap What You Sow (1964) |

Trouble in Mind is the second album by the American musician Mance Lipscomb, released in 1961. It was his only album for a major label. Lipscomb promoted the album by playing various folk festivals.

The songs were later released on various Arhoolie Records compilations. Trouble in Mind was rereleased in 2003 with 13 additional tracks from the same recording sessions.

== Production ==
Recorded in Lipscomb's Texas home, the album was produced by Chris Strachwitz and Mack McCormick. The pair had intended to record Lightnin' Hopkins, who was out of the state; Lipscomb was suggested, and they recorded him in Lipscomb's kitchen. Lipscomb played many of the songs with a capo on the guitar neck. Lipscomb did not appreciate having to record multiple versions of the songs, vowing that he was never again going to perform the title track. The hopeful "Trouble in Mind" was a favorite of many mid-century acoustic blues musicians.

== Critical reception ==
Professional ratings
Review scores
| Source | Rating |
|---|---|
| AllMusic | 3/5 stars |
| The Penguin Guide to Blues Recordings | 2.5/4 stars |

The Journal of American Folklore wrote that "this great Texas songster absorbed the hard blues and spirituals, the ballads and dance songs, and renders them in a rich, appealing understatement."

No Depression said that "Lipscomb's picked, rhythmic style and grab-bag repertoire had a profound influence on pop artists." AllMusic wrote that Trouble in Mind constitutes "Lipscomb and his acoustic guitar, affably picking and singing his way through an assortment of largely traditional material." The Penguin Guide to Blues Recordings noted that "the separation of voice and guitar into different speakers is distracting," although it praised "Rocks and Gravel Makes a Solid Road".

== Track listing ==
| No. | Title | Length |
|---|---|---|
| 1. | "Captain, Captain" |
| 2. | "Careless Love" |
| 3. | "When Death Comes Creeping in Your Room (Run, Sinner, Run)" |
| 4. | "Alabama Bound" |
| 5. | "Buck Dance" |
| 6. | "Night Time Is the Right Time" |
| 7. | "Rocks and Gravel Makes a Solid Road" |
| 8. | "Johnnie Take a One on Me" |
| 9. | "Motherless Children" |
| 10. | "Which-a-Way Do Red River Run" |
| 11. | "Trouble in Mind" |
| 12. | "Ballad of the Boll Weevil" |
