= Ron Thompson (blues guitarist) =

American guitarist and singer (1953–2020)

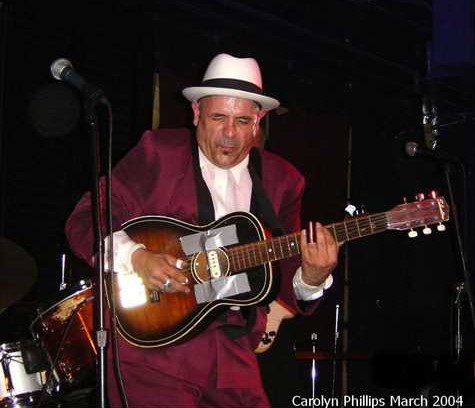

Background information
- Born: July 5, 1953; Oakland, California, U.S.
- Died: February 15, 2020 (aged 66) Hayward, California, U.S.
- Genres: Electric blues, blues rock
- Occupations: Guitarist, singer, songwriter
- Instruments: Slide guitar, vocals
- Years active: Early 1970s–2020
- Labels: Blind Pig, various

Ron Thompson (July 5, 1953 – February 15, 2020) was an American electric blues and blues rock guitarist, singer and songwriter. Thompson released nine albums after 1983 on labels including Blind Pig. He worked with Little Joe Blue, John Lee Hooker, Lowell Fulson, Etta James and Big Mama Thornton.

Thompson commented on his preferred style, "blues is like a medicine, or religion to me, it'll cleanse your soul". Meanwhile, Mick Fleetwood stated, "Ron Thompson is my favorite guitarist".

== Life and career ==
Thompson was born in Oakland, California, United States, and had mastered basic guitar and slide guitar techniques by his mid-teens. He was educated at Newark High School, in Newark, California. In the early 1970s, Thompson played backing to Little Joe Blue, and worked solo and as a sideman in San Francisco Bay Area clubs. He joined John Lee Hooker's backing band in 1975 and stayed with him for three years. In 1980, Thompson formed his own group, the Resistors, and secured a recording contract with Takoma Records. He played at the San Francisco Blues Festival in 1978, 1979 and 1983.

In 1983, he released his debut album, Treat Her Like Gold. Thompson also found employment where he separately worked with Lowell Fulson, Etta James and Big Mama Thornton. Thompson's second album Resister Twister was released in 1987 and was nominated for a Grammy Award, plus 1990's Just Like a Devil, was taken from his work on Mark Naftalin's Blue Monday Party radio show.

Thompson's 2007 album, Resonator was a purely acoustic production.

Thompson died in Hayward, California on February 15, 2020, at the age of 66, due to complications from diabetes.

== Discography ==
Year	Title	Record label
1983	Treat Her Like Gold	Takoma
1987	Resister Twister	Blind Pig
1990	Just Like a Devil (Recorded Live)	Winner
1998	Magic Touch	Poore Boy
2003	Just Pickin' (1970's material)	Acrobat
2004	Still Resisting (reissue of Resistor Twister)	Poore Boy
2007	Resonator	32-20 Records
2015	Son of Boogie Woogie	Little Village Foundation
2020	From the Patio: Live at Poor House Bistro, Vol. 1 (recorded 2014)	Little Village Foundation

With John Lee Hooker

- The Cream (Tomato, 1978)

== See also ==
- List of electric blues musicians
