= List of slide guitarists =

Guitarists well-known for using a slide

Slide guitarists are musicians who are well-known for playing guitar with a "slide", a smooth, hard object, held in the fretting hand and placed against the strings to control the pitch. Beginning with guitarists in the American South and Hawaii in early 20th century, slide guitar styles have developed in a variety of musical settings, including blues, country, and rock. Most slide guitarists may also perform with guitars using traditional fretting techniques; additionally, some also play various types of steel guitars.

== List ==
List of slide guitarists, showing name, birth year, death year, origin, primary genre, and reference(s)
Name	Birth year	Death year	Origin	Primary genre	Ref(s)
Duane Allman	1946	1971	Tennessee	Southern rock	
Kokomo Arnold	1901*	1968	Georgia	Acoustic blues	
Barbecue Bob	1902	1931	Georgia	Acoustic blues	
Jeff Beck	1944	2023	England	Rock	
Elvin Bishop	1942		California	Rock	
Black Ace	1905	1972	Texas	Country blues	
Mike Bloomfield	1943	1981	Illinois	Electric blues	
Willie Brown	1900	1952	Mississippi	Delta blues	
R. L. Burnside	1926	2005	Mississippi	Hill country blues	
Joe Carter	1927	2001	Georgia	Chicago blues	
George Cassidy	1936	2023	Belfast	Jazz	
Sam Collins	1887	1949	Louisiana	Country blues	
Ry Cooder	1947		California	Americana	
CeDell Davis	1926	2017	Arkansas	Delta blues	
David "Honeyboy" Edwards	1915	2011	Mississippi	Electric blues	
John Fahey	1939	2001	Washington, D.C.	Folk	
Frank Ferera	1885	1951	Hawaii	Hawaiian music	
Rory Gallagher	1948	1995	Ireland	Blues rock	
Billy Gibbons	1949		Texas	Blues rock	
Peter Green	1946	2020	England	Electric blues	
John P. Hammond	1942	2026	New York	Electric blues	
George Harrison	1943	2001	England	Rock	
Earl Hooker	1930	1970	Mississippi	Chicago blues	
Son House	1902	1988	Mississippi	Delta blues	
J. B. Hutto	1926	1983	South Carolina	Chicago blues	
Bo Weavil Jackson	Unknown	Unknown	U.S.	Country blues	
Elmore James	1918	1963	Mississippi	Chicago blues	
Blind Lemon Jefferson	1893	1929	Texas	Country blues	
Blind Willie Johnson	1897	1945	Texas	Gospel blues	
Robert Johnson	1911	1938	Mississippi	Delta blues	
Brian Jones	1942	1969	England	Blues rock	
Joseph Kekuku	1874	1932	Hawaii	Hawaiian music	
Alexis Korner	1928	1984	France	Electric blues	
Leo Kottke	1945		Georgia	Folk	
Lead Belly	1889	1949	Louisiana	Country blues	
Furry Lewis	1893*	1981	Mississippi	Country blues	
John Littlejohn	1931	1994	Mississippi	Chicago blues	
Robert Lockwood, Jr.	1915	2006	Arkansas	Delta blues	
John Mayall	1933	2024	England	Electric blues	
Mississippi Fred McDowell	1904	1972	Tennessee	Hill country blues	
Ellen McIlwaine	1945	2021	Tennessee	Blues	
Blind Willie McTell	1901*	1959	Georgia	Country blues	
Steve Miller	1943		Wisconsin	Rock	
Muddy Waters	1913	1983	Mississippi	Chicago blues	
Hambone Willie Newbern	1901	1965	Tennessee	Country blues	
Robert Nighthawk	1909	1967	Arkansas	Chicago blues	
Jimmy Page	1944		England	Rock	
Charlie Patton	1891	1934	Mississippi	Delta blues	
Dan Pickett	1907	1967	Alabama	Country blues	
Rod Price	1947	2005	England	Rock	
Keith Richards	1943		England	Rock	
Johnny Shines	1915	1992	Tennessee	Chicago blues	
Jeremy Spencer	1948		England	Electric blues	
Houston Stackhouse	1910	1980	Mississippi	Country blues	
Tampa Red	1904	1981	Georgia	Urban blues	
Eddie Taylor	1923	1985	Mississippi	Chicago blues	
Hound Dog Taylor	1917*	1975	Mississippi	Electric blues	
Mick Taylor	1949		England	Blues rock	
Ramblin' Thomas	Unknown	Unknown	Louisiana	Country blues	
U Tin	1931	2019	Myanmar	Burmese classical, folk	
Joe Walsh	1947		Kansas	Rock	
Sylvester Weaver	1897*	1960	Kentucky	Country blues	
Casey Bill Weldon	1909	Unknown	Arkansas	Country blues	
Bukka White	1909	1977	Mississippi	Delta blues	
Big Joe Williams	1903	1982	Mississippi	Delta blues	
Alan Wilson	1943	1970	Massachusetts	Electric blues	
Johnny Winter	1944	2014	Texas	Electric blues	
Oscar "Buddy" Woods	c.1890*	1950*	Louisiana	Urban blues	
Zoot Horn Rollo	1949		California	Rock	
An asterisk (*) denotes that other sources give different dates, origin, or style.

== Sources ==
- Erlewine, Michael; Bogdanov, Vladimir; Woodstra, Chris; Koda, Cub, eds. (1996). "Artists". All Music Guide to the Blues. San Francisco: Miller Freeman Books. ISBN 0-87930-424-3.
- Bogdanov, Vladimir; Woodstra, Chris; Erlewine, Stephen Thomas, eds. (2003). "Arists". All Music Guide to the Blues (3rd ed.). San Francisco: Backbeat Books. ISBN 0-87930-736-6.
- Herzhaft, Gerard (1992). "Artists". Encyclopedia of the Blues. Fayetteville, Arkansas: University of Arkansas Press. ISBN 1-55728-252-8.
- Komara, Edward, ed. (2004). "Artists". Encyclopedia of the Blues. New York City: Routledge. ISBN 978-1135958329.
- Madsen, Pete (2005). Slide Guitar: Know the Players, Play the Music. San Francisco, California: Backbeat Books. ISBN 978-1476853222.
- Prown, Pete; Newquist, Harvey P. (1997). Legends of Rock Guitar: The Essential Reference of Rock's Greatest Guitarists. Milwaukee, Wisconsin: Hal Leonard. ISBN 978-0793540426.
- Roth, Arlen (1975). Traditional, Country and Electric Slide Guitar. Oak Publications. ISBN 978-1783234936.
- Shadwick, Keith (2001). "Artists". The Encyclopedia of Jazz & Blues. London: Quantum. ISBN 978-0-681-08644-9.
