= HowellDevine =

American blues trio

HowellDevine is an American blues trio, formed in 2011, and based in the San Francisco Bay Area. They have released four albums: Delta Grooves (2012), Jumps, Boogies & Wobbles (2013), Modern Sounds of Ancient Juju (2014), and Howl (2017). Both Jumps, Boogies & Wobbles and Modern Sounds of Ancient Juju were released by Arhoolie Records. Jumps, Boogies & Wobbles was the first time Arhoolie had chosen to release a blues album in almost three decades. After Smithsonian Folkways Recordings acquired Arhoolie's catalog in 2016, the label stopped issuing new recordings, and seeking to stretch the boundaries of their sound, the band signed with the Little Village Foundation label in 2017 and released Howl, recorded at Kid Andersen’s Greaseland Studios.

The group consists of Joshua Howell on vocals, harmonica, and guitar; Pete Devine on drums and other percussion, and Joe Kyle Jr. on bass. Their music is mainly rooted in the Delta Blues and Hill country blues of Mississippi. Each of their albums feature a mix of original compositions, traditional blues songs, and covers of songs composed or popularized by early blues artists, though not usually those artists’ most familiar work. Among HowellDevine's own compositions are longer, fast tempo numbers, as well as one in which the harmonica and rhythm section evoke steam locomotives that brought the early Southern blues musicians north.

The recordings feature Howell on an Epiphone Dot electric guitar, a 1931 National Duolian steel resonator guitar, and acoustic guitar, using fingerpicking and often slide technique. For most live performances he uses the electric guitar exclusively. Howell plays various Hohner Marine Band harmonicas. Devine uses a full drum kit for most live performances (and often a washboard, played with drumsticks), though depending on the venue, he has used a scaled-down percussion set up. Kyle almost always plays an acoustic upright bass, but has used a Kay hollow body electric bass for songs with funk elements.

HowellDevine performs regularly throughout Northern California, including twice-monthly appearances at Club DeLuxe in San Francisco, and with growing frequency, at The Freight and Salvage in Berkeley. They occasionally play beyond the region. In 2018, HowellDevine played the Waterfront Blues Festival in Portland OR, performing on the Brewery Main Stage as well as the FedEx Crossroads Stage. In 2016, they performed at the Strawberry Music Festival in Tuolumne, CA. In 2015, they performed at two New England events: They were filmed for The Extended Play Sessions at the Fallout Shelter in Norwood, Massachusetts and they played on two days of the 18th Annual Rhythm & Roots Festival in Charlestown, Rhode Island. In 2013, HowellDevine was a finalist among 120 bands in The Blues Foundation's 2013 International Blues Challenge held in Memphis, Tennessee. In addition to headlining their own performances, they have opened for other acts including Johnny Winter, Dr. John, the Preservation Hall Jazz Band, Charlie Musselwhite, Elvin Bishop, and Maria Muldaur.

In 2015, “Elwood Blues” (Dan Aykroyd) featured HowellDevine on his nationally syndicated Bluesmobile radio show, interviewing Howell, with a one-hour focus on the band and their influences. The band played Frank Stoke's "It Won’t Be Long Now" in the studio, Aykroyd also chose a HowellDevine original "Railroad Stomp" as his Blues Breaker Pick Of The Week.

== History ==
Howell and Devine met when Howell was booked to open for Devine's band at a show in San Francisco. Two years later, Chris Strachwitz, who founded Arhoolie Records in 1960, discovered HowellDevine playing in that city's Mission District, saying the band reminded him of the music he experienced in Mississippi Delta juke joints. He then signed them to Arhoolie for the two albums that followed, Jumps, Boogies & Wobbles and Modern Sounds of Ancient Juju.

Howell took up the blues harmonica at age 14. While still a teenager, he would sit in during blues shows at venues in Oakland, CA that would allow a minor to play, including Eli's Mile High Club and Your Place Too, where he played with Haskell Sadler, also known as Cool Papa. Later he would also play harmonica with Arkansas-born country blues guitarist/singer Robert Lowery in Santa Cruz, CA. Howell's chief harmonica influences are Sonny Boy Williamson II, Little Walter, and Sonny Terry. He took up guitar in his later teenage years.

Devine has been a percussionist in the Bay Area's vintage jazz, blues, and country scene for decades. Citing Baby Dodds, Zutty Singleton and Francis Clay as major influences, he's appeared on over 32 albums and as part of Bo Grumpus, Lavay Smith's Red Hot Skillet Lickers, the gypsy-jazz combo Gaucho, and his own Devine's Jug Band, among others.

Since 2012, the trio has included Kyle on bass, a veteran who's played with Lavay Smith's Red Hot Skillet Lickers and continues to play with The Waybacks, Americano Social Club, and Mal Sharpe's Big Money in Jazz, among others.

On Delta Grooves, bass was played by Sam Rocha; Safa Shokrai played bass on two tracks on Jumps, Boogies & Wobbles and joins for occasional live performances.

Ralph Carney played tenor saxophone on "Harmonica Wobble #2" and "Spoonful" on Delta Grooves. Kid Andersen played the Hammond B3 organ on "Sookie Sookie" and "Funky Miracle" on Howl.

HowellDevine released Strange Time Blues on Dyna Phonic Records in 2022.
