= Oscar "Buddy" Woods =

American guitarist, singer and songwriter (1903–1955)

- Also known as: The Lone Wolf
- Born: April 7, 1903; Natchitoches, Louisiana, United States
- Died: December 14, 1955 (aged 52) Shreveport, Louisiana, United States
- Genres: Texas blues
- Occupations: Singer-songwriter; Guitarist
- Instruments: Slide guitar; Lap steel guitar; Vocal
- Years active: 1920s–1950s
- Labels: Victor, Decca, Vocalion and Document (later re-issues)

Oscar "Buddy" Woods (April 7, 1903 – December 14, 1955) was an American Texas blues guitarist, singer and songwriter.

Woods, who was an early blues pioneer in lap steel, slide guitar playing, recorded thirty-five tracks between 1930 and 1940. He recorded solo and as part of a duo, the Shreveport Home Wreckers, and with a six- or seven-piece group, the Wampus Cats. Early in his career he backed Jimmie Davis on some of his recordings. Woods's best-known song was "Lone Wolf Blues", from which came his billing as "The Lone Wolf".

== Life and career ==
He was born near Natchitoches, Louisiana, United States, on April 7, 1903. He relocated to Shreveport, Louisiana around 1925, where he started to work as a street musician and played for tips at juke joints. Various sources claim that he learned the rudiments of playing a bottleneck slide guitar after watching a Hawaiian music ensemble that toured in Louisiana in the early part of the 1920s. Woods teamed up with another guitar player, Ed Schaffer, and they performed as the Shreveport Home Wreckers at the Blue Goose Grocery and Market, a speakeasy in Shreveport. In May 1930, the duo recorded for Victor Records in Memphis, Tennessee.

In May 1932, the Shreveport Home Wreckers backed Jimmie Davis on four sides recorded in Dallas, Texas. They also recorded another two tracks of their own, released as a single, on which they were billed as Eddie and Oscar. The significance of this mixed-race recording session spilled over into a joint tour—a unique sociological situation at that time in the South.

Woods next recorded for Decca Records in March 1936 in New Orleans. The tracks included his best-known song, "Lone Wolf Blues," and the first take of "Don't Sell It, Don't Give It Away", which he wrote. The records sold well, and by the time Woods recorded again, in October 1937, the Shreveport Home Wreckers had added new members and became the Wampus Cats. They backed both Woods and Kitty Gray, a singer and pianist, on several tracks recorded in 1937 and 1938 for Vocalion Records.

In October 1940, Woods made his final recordings, five tracks for the Library of Congress. Following the session, John Lomax wrote, "Oscar (Buddy) Woods, Joe Harris and Kid West are all professional Negro guitarists and singers of Texas Avenue, Shreveport. ... The songs I have recorded are among those they use to cajole nickels and dimes from the pockets of listeners." Local records suggest that Woods continued to live in Shreveport, and after his recording career was over, he played again as a street musician and at dances.

Woods died in Shreveport in December 1955.

== Style and legacy ==
Woods played his guitar flat on his lap, in a similar manner to Hawaiian guitar players, using a small medicine bottle as a slide. The music journalist Uncle Dave Lewis noted that Woods played "in the style of lap steel, bottleneck blues slide guitar; some experts believe he may have been the primary force behind the creation of this whole genre".

Woods's guitar-playing techniques were passed on to his protégé, Black Ace, who was approximately fifteen years younger than Woods and had played with him around Shreveport. The compilation album mentioned below includes tracks by both Woods and Black Ace.

The Shreveport Home Wreckers track "Flying Crow Blues" was recorded in 1932. Robert Johnson used one set of its lyrics, almost word for word, for the final verse of his song "Love in Vain" (1937).

== Discography ==
=== Compilation albums ===
| Year | Title | Record label |
|---|---|---|
| 1993 | Texas Slide Guitars 1930–1938 | Document |

== See also ==
- List of slide guitarists
- List of Texas blues musicians
