= David Barrett (musician) =

American musician and author (born 1973)

- Born: February 6, 1973 (age 53)
- Genres: Blues
- Occupations: Music Instructor (School of the Blues & BluesHarmonica.com), Author (Mel Bay Publications), Clinician (Harmonica Masterclass Workshop)
- Instrument: Harmonica
- Website: http://www.bluesharmonica.com

David Barrett (born February 6, 1973) is an American blues harmonica player, author and teacher.

== Early years ==
Barrett started playing the harmonica at age fourteen. At age sixteen Gary Smith took Barrett as a private student. Smith also introduced Barrett to the local blues jam scene and even invited him to participate is some of the local harmonica blowouts. At age eighteen Barrett was studying music theory in college (De Anza College in Cupertino, California) and started teaching private harmonica lessons at local music stores and institutes in the California Bay Area. Since 2002 he has been teaching at his own School of the Blues in San Jose.

== Author ==
Barrett has authored a number of harmonica instructional books with Mel Bay Publications. He also runs a website, BluesHarmonica.com that teaches harmonica and is the founder and head instructor of Harmonica Masterclass Workshops.

Barrett also teaches, judges and performs at events around the world, such as Hohner's World Harmonica Festival and Steve Baker's Harmonica Masters Workshop in Trossingen, Germany.

== Private lessons ==
Since age eighteen Barrett has been teaching blues harmonica lessons. In 2002 Barrett founded School of the Blues in San Jose, California—the first school for the specific study of blues music. Its instructors (Guitar, Bass, Organ/Keyboard/Piano, Vocals, and Drums) teach private lessons and workshops as well as fly-in lessons. Barrett teaches on average fifty private students a month.

Barrett is also active in working with local hospitals, teaching his Harmonica for Fun & Health classes to people with COPD (Emphysema), asthma and heart disease. David, in conjunction with Dr. Dennis Bucko, developed a harmonica based pulmonary therapy program and book/CD designed to help people with respiratory problems [Better Breathers]

== Performing and recording artist ==
Barrett is a Grammy Nominated blues harmonica player (for his work on John Lee Hooker Jr.'s album All Odds Against Me) and performs regularly in the California Bay Area (San Francisco Blues Festival, Monterey Bay Blues Festival, etc.) and abroad (Chicago, Germany, etc.). Recently he played as a featured artist in Mark Hummel's Blues Harmonica Blowouts, alongside James Cotton, Charlie Musselwhite, Kim Wilson, and Mark Hummel. Barrett has recorded three albums, Serious Fun, We Are The Blues and History of the Blues Harmonica Concert. He has also released It Takes Three, a project with Gary Smith and Aki Kumar.

== Musical associates ==
Barrett has worked or played alongside the following musicians: Charlie Musselwhite, Mark Hummel, Lee Oskar, Rod Piazza, James Cotton, Billy Boy Arnold, Jason Ricci, Paul deLay, Jerry Portnoy, Gary Primich, Howard Levy, Magic Dick, John Mayall, Annie Raines, Paul Oscher, Sam Myers, Snooky Pryor, Rob Paparozzi, Carlos del Junco, Lazy Lester, Kim Wilson, Dennis Gruenling, Junior Watson, and Nick Moss.

== Discography ==
=== As bandleader ===
- 2003 Serious Fun (with John Garcia) (Harmonica Masterclass Company)
- 2006 We Are the Blues: School of the All-Star Band Live in the Studio! (Presented by the Monterey Bay Blues Festival) (School of the Blues)
- 2010 History of the Blues Harmonica Concert (Featuring David Barrett, Joe Filisko, Dennis Gruenling, Kinya Pollard, with Rusty Zinn and John Garcia) (Back Bender Records) [2CD]
- 2015 It Takes Three: Three Generations of South Bay Blues Harmonica (with Gary Smith and Aki Kumar) (Greaseland Records)

=== As sideman ===
- 2004 John Heath, John Heath
- 2007 What You Need, Shane Dwight
- 2008 All Odds Against Me, John Lee Hooker Jr.
