= Mance Lipscomb =

American blues singer and guitarist (1895–1976)

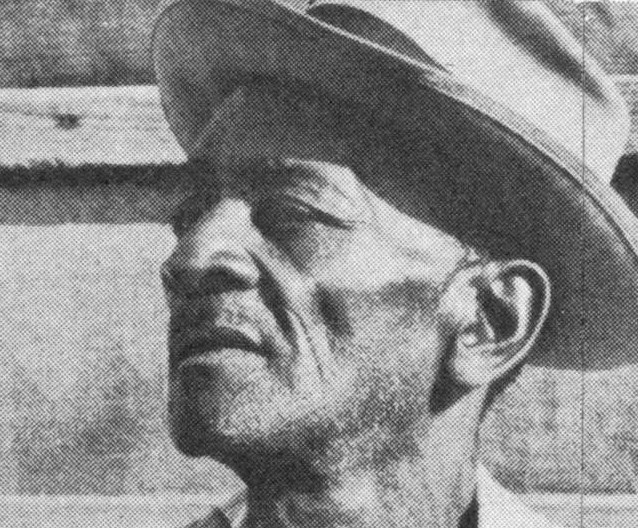
- Lipscomb in the 1960s

Background information
- Born: Beau De Glen Lipscomb; April 9, 1895 near Navasota, Texas, U.S.
- Died: January 30, 1976 (aged 80) Navasota, Texas, U.S.
- Genres: Blues; folk
- Occupation: Musician
- Instruments: Guitar; vocals
- Years active: 1960–1976

Beau De Glen "Mance" Lipscomb (Note: The researchers Bob Eagle and Eric LeBlanc stated that his forenames were recorded as Bowdie Glen, Bodyglin, Body G., and Bodie. The discographer Stefan Wirz gives Bowdie Glenn, a derivative of Beau de Glenn.) (April 9, 1895 – January 30, 1976) was an American blues singer, guitarist and songster.

== Biography ==
Lipscomb was born April 9, 1895, near Navasota, Texas. His father had been born into slavery in Alabama; his mother was half African American and half Native American. As a youth, Lipscomb took the name Mance (short for emancipation) from a friend of his oldest brother, Charlie.

Due to his father's early departure from home, he was compelled to end his schooling after the third grade and work in the fields with his mother.

For most of his life, Lipscomb supported himself as a tenant farmer in Texas. His mother bought him a guitar and he taught himself to play by watching and listening. He became an accomplished performer then and played regularly for years at local gatherings, mostly what he called "Saturday night suppers" hosted by someone in the area. He and his wife regularly hosted such gatherings for a while. Until around 1960, most of his musical activity took place within what he called his "precinct", the area around Navasota, Texas.

He was discovered and recorded by Mack McCormick and Chris Strachwitz in 1960, during a revival of interest in the country blues. He recorded many albums of blues, ragtime, Tin Pan Alley, and folk music (most of them released by Strachwitz's Arhoolie Records), singing and accompanying himself on acoustic guitar. Lipscomb had a "dead-thumb" finger-picking guitar technique and an expressive voice. He honed his skills by playing in nearby Brenham, Texas, with a blind musician, Sam Rogers.

His first release was the album Texas Sharecropper and Songster (1960). Lipscomb performed songs in a wide range of genres, from old songs such as "Sugar Babe" (the first he ever learned), to pop numbers like "Shine On, Harvest Moon" and "It's a Long Way to Tipperary".

In 1961 he recorded the album Trouble in Mind, released by Reprise Records. In May 1963, he appeared at the first Monterey Folk Festival, (which later became the Monterey Pop Festival) alongside other folk artists such as Bob Dylan, and Peter, Paul and Mary in California.

Unlike many of his contemporaries, Lipscomb had not recorded in the early blues era. Michael Birnbaum recorded interviews with Mance in 1966 at his home in Navasota about his life and music. These recordings are in the Ethnomusicology library at University of California, Los Angeles. His life is well documented in his autobiography, I Say Me for a Parable: The Oral Autobiography of Mance Lipscomb, Texas Bluesman, narrated to Glen Alyn (published posthumously). He was the subject of a short 1971 documentary film by Les Blank, called A Well Spent Life.

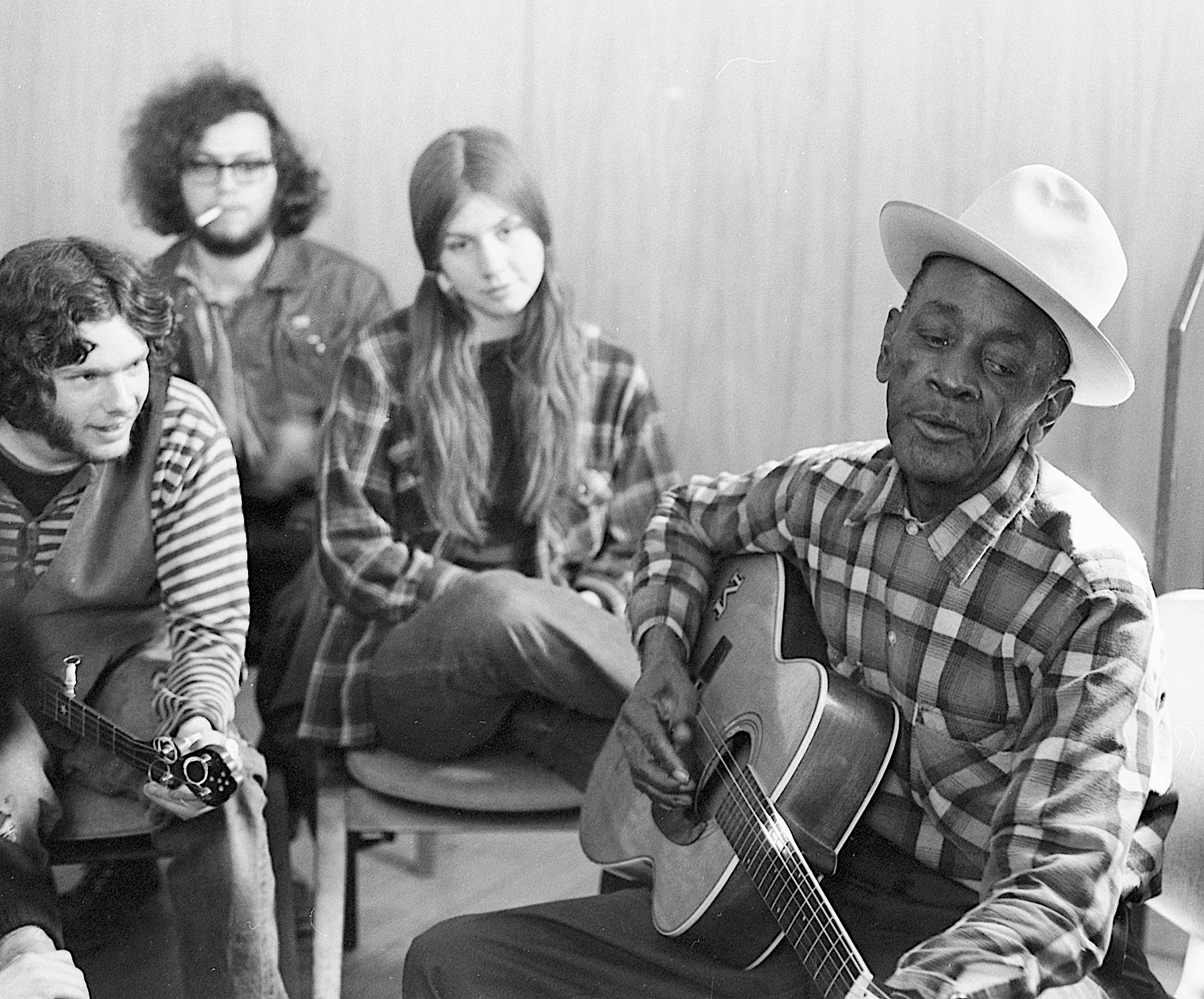
Mance Lipscomb guitar workshop, Beloit, Wisconsin, 1970

Following his discovery by McCormick and Strachwitz, Lipscomb became an important figure in the American folk music revival of the 1960s. He was a regular performer at folk festivals and folk-blues clubs around the United States, notably the Ash Grove in Los Angeles, California. He was known not only for his singing and intricate guitar style, but also as a storyteller and country "sage".

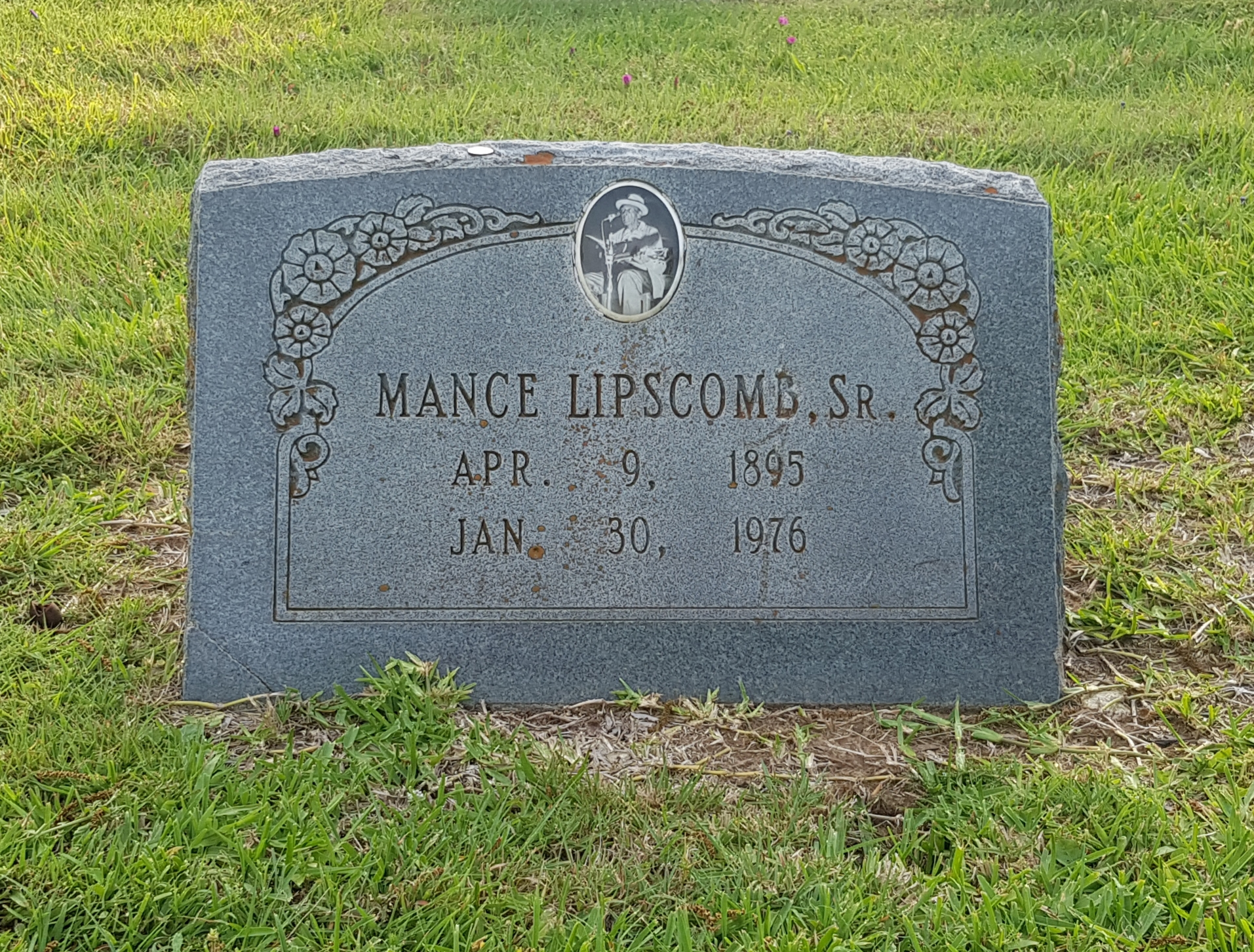
Tombstone of Mance Lipscomb in the Oakland Cemetery of Navasota

He died in Navasota, Texas, in 1976, two years after suffering a stroke. He is buried in Oakland Cemetery, Navasota.

== Film ==
- A Well Spent Life (1971). Documentary directed by Les Blank and Skip Gerson. El Cerrito, California: Flower Films. Released on videotape in 1979. ISBN 0-933621-09-4.
- The Blues Accordin' to Lightnin' Hopkins (1970). Directed by Les Blank.

== Honors ==
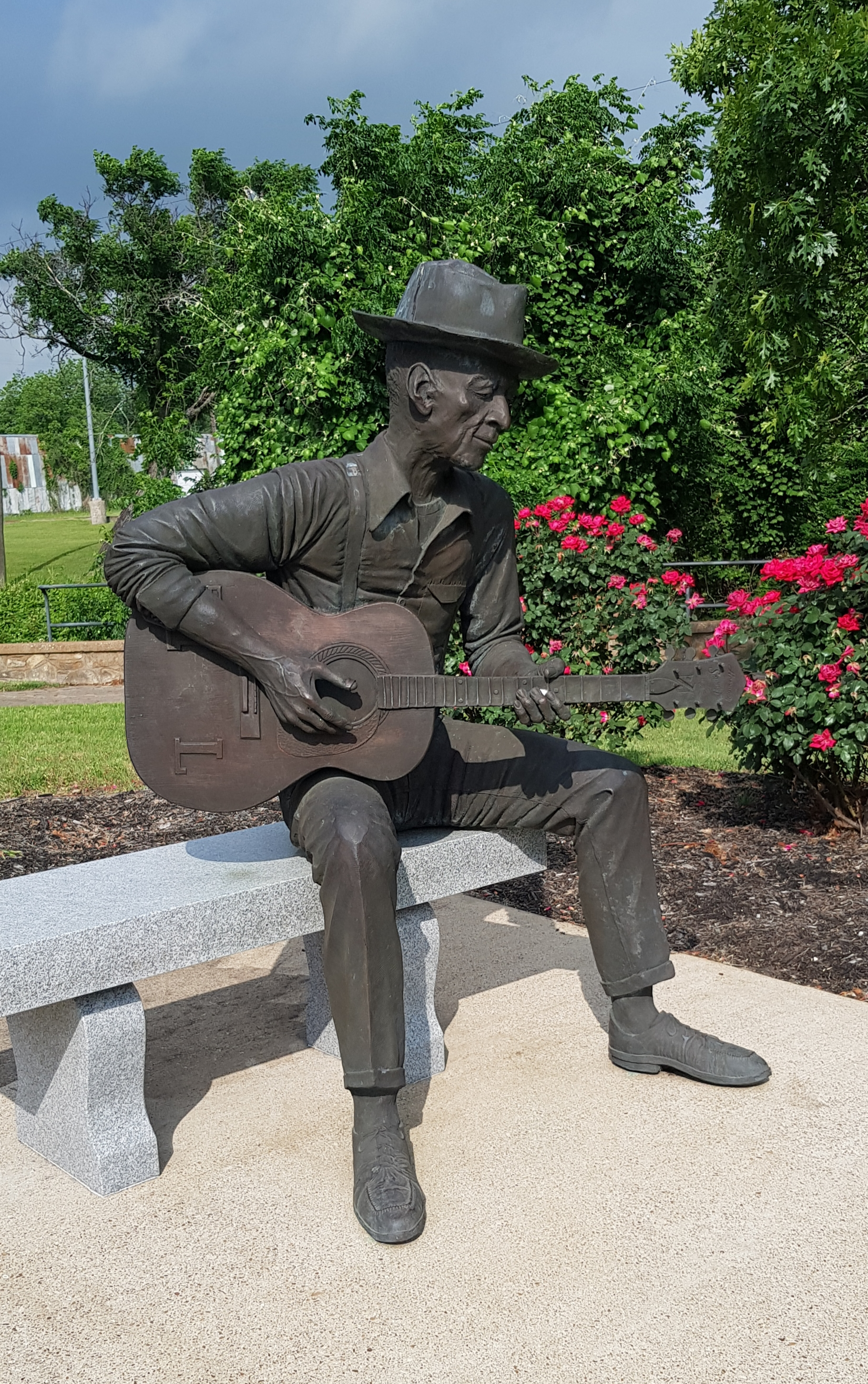
Sculpture of Mance Lipscomb (2011)

- An annual Navasota Blues Festival is held in his honor.
- On August 12, 2011, a bronze sculpture of him was unveiled in Mance Lipscomb Park in Navasota. The statue was sculpted by the artist Sid Henderson of California and weighs almost 300 pounds. It portrays Lipscomb playing his guitar whilst seated on a bench, with room for fans to sit beside him and play their own guitars at his side.

== See also ==
- List of blues musicians
- List of country blues musicians
- List of guitarists by genre
- List of people from Texas
