= Bogaczów, Lower Silesian Voivodeship =

Bogaczów
- Village
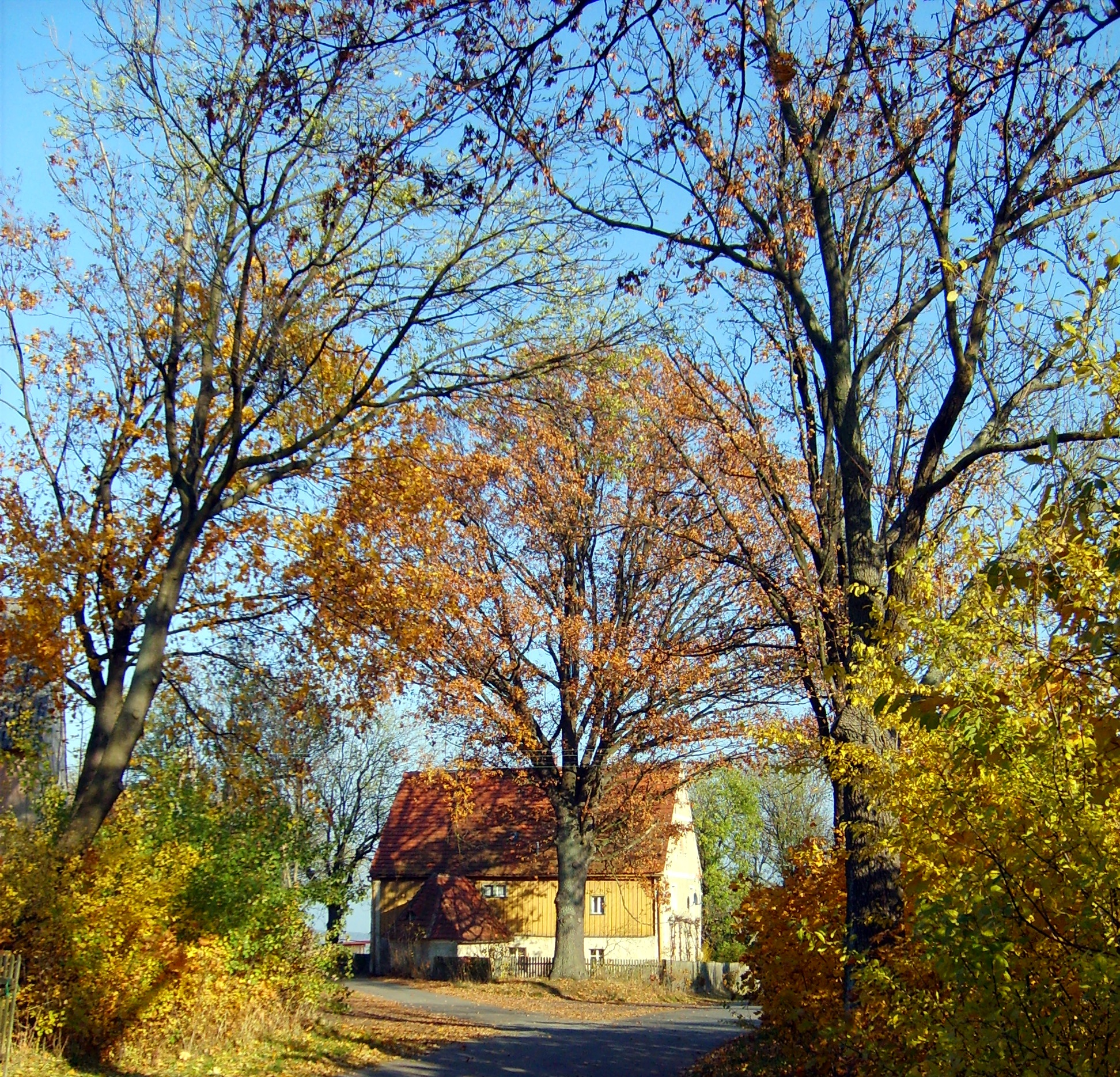

- Location within Poland
- Coordinates: 51°04′19″N 16°03′58″E
- Country: Poland
- Voivodeship: Lower Silesian
- Powiat: Jawor
- Gmina: Męcinka

Bogaczów [bɔˈɡat͡ʂuf] is a village in the administrative district of Gmina Męcinka, within Jawor County, Lower Silesian Voivodeship, in south-western Poland.

== Notable residents ==
- Chris Strachwitz (born 1931), German-American music producer
