= Aki Kumar =

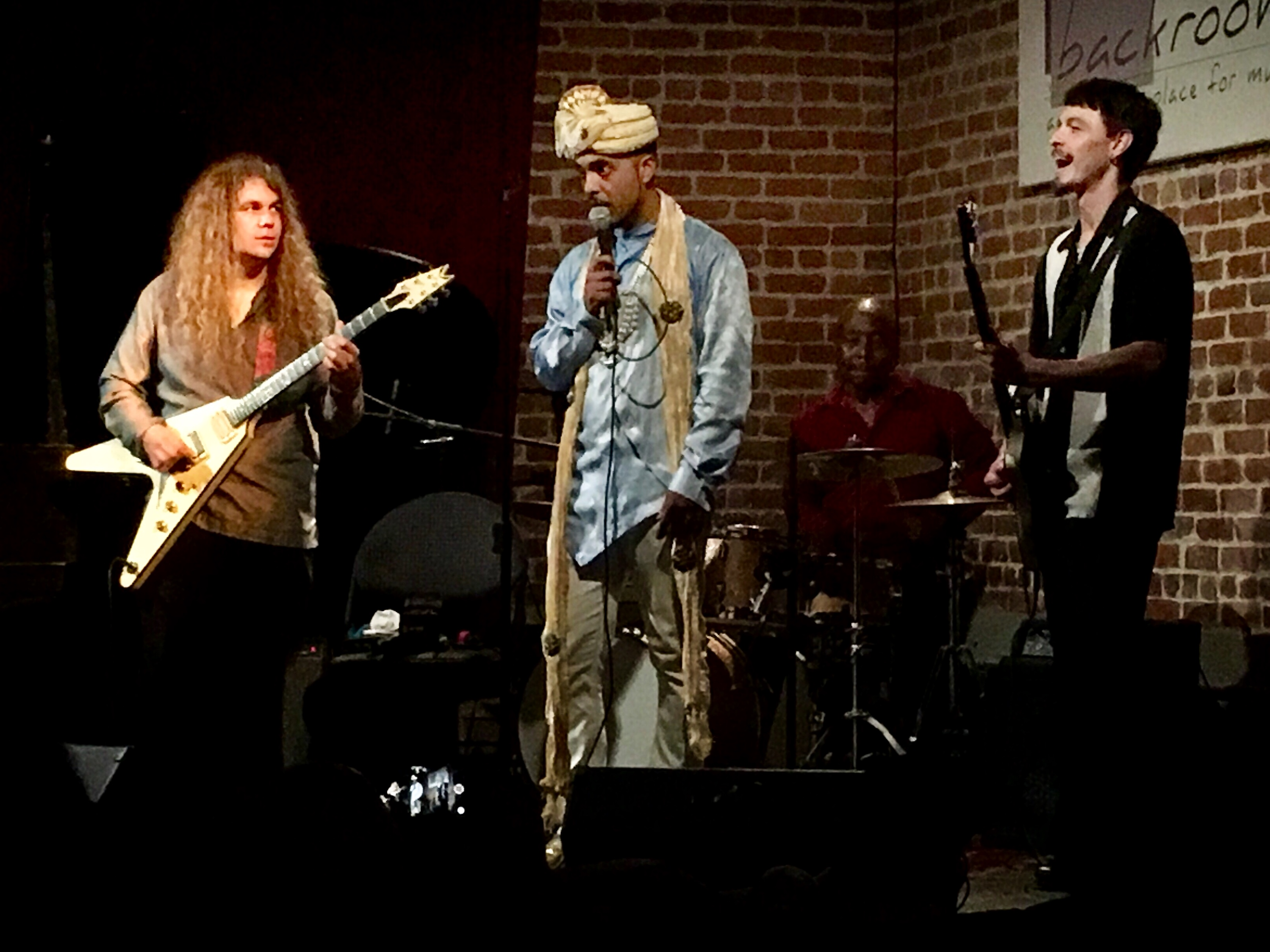

Background information
- Born: 1980 (age 45–46); Mumbai, India
- Genres: Blues, Bollywood
- Website: https://akikumar.com/

Akarsha "Aki" Kumar (born 1980) is an Indian-born blues musician now living in San Jose, California. After working at a technology job, he is now a harmonica player and vocalist.

== Early life, education, and former career ==
Kumar was born and grew up in Mumbai, where his parents' upbringing and eclectic tastes—his father was a Kannadiga, his mother a Telugu—exposed him to a broad range of sounds—everything from rock 'n' roll and pop to the more traditional sounds of Bollywood film scores and Indian classical music. In his youth, he studied both keyboards and tabla, and acquired his first harmonica from his father. He listened to "everything from Bach to John Denver, from Stevie Wonder to the Police" in addition to music that dominated the Indian subcontinent.

He moved to the US in 1998 to study computer science, initially in Oklahoma City and then at San Jose State University in Silicon Valley. He was first attracted to American oldies radio, and then discovered the blues by visiting nightclubs and bars in the Bay Area. Soon after completing a degree, he went to work at Adobe. He turned to music full-time after Adobe eliminated his department and laid him off in 2013.

== Music career ==
Kumar's harmonica playing is rooted in the classical style invented by Little Walter and others, but his blues style is eclectic. He developed his skills by studying with David Barrett, who operates the School of the Blues in San Jose. He played regularly in the band Tip of the Top for several years before forming his own band and launching a solo career.

Kumar expresses his pride in his Indian heritage by blending melodies from Hindi movies and Indian classical music with American blues, creating a fusion of East and West that he calls "Bollywood blues". He formulated the concept while humming along to a song from his homeland one day and realizing that it had a blues progression and that he could sing it "with a Jimmy Reed feel". Titled "Ajeeb Daastaan Hei Yah (This Is a Strange Tale)", it appears as the final track of his first album, Don't Hold Back, which was released in 2014.

His second effort, Aki Goes to Bollywood (2016), on blues man's Jim Pugh's Little Village Foundation label, fuses Chicago blues and Bollywood music. The cover art resembles graphics on a Bollywood movie poster. Kumar released his third album, Hindi Man Blues, in 2018, and his fourth, Dilruba, on Sony Music India in 2020, and a single, Zindagi, on Little Village in 2021.

Kumar mainly performs around the San Francisco Bay Area with his quartet, hosts blues jams, and works as a session musician. He performed at Hardly Strictly Bluegrass in 2016 and 2018. In late 2019 he toured in India for the first time, playing in Delhi, Gurugram, and Mumbai.

== Personal life ==
As of 2016, Kumar and his wife live in the Cambrian Park neighborhood of San Jose.

== Discography ==
- 2009 Depot Street Blues (with Tip of the Top) (Delta King Records)
- 2010 Rock Tonight (with Tip of the Top) (Delta King Records)
- 2011 From Memphis to Greaseland (with Tip of the Top) (Delta King Records)
- 2014 Don't Hold Back (Greaseland Records)
- 2015 It Takes Three: Three Generations of South Bay Blues Harmonica (with Gary Smith and David Barrett) (Greaseland Records)
- 2016 Aki Goes to Bollywood (Little Village Foundation)
- 2018 Hindi Man Blues (Little Village Foundation)
- 2020 Dilruba (Sony Music India)
- 2021 "Zindagi" (single) (Little Village Foundation)
- 2025 God Bless the USA (Little Village Foundation)
