= Milk Cow Blues =

1934 single by Kokomo Arnold

Single by Kokomo Arnold
- B-side: "Old Original Kokomo Blues"
- Released: October 1934
- Recorded: September 10, 1934
- Genre: Blues
- Length: 3:07
- Label: Decca
- Songwriter: Kokomo Arnold

Kokomo Arnold singles chronology
"Gitfiddle Jim" (1934)	"Milk Cow Blues" (1934)	"Back to the Woods" (1934)

"Milk Cow Blues" is a blues song written and originally recorded by Kokomo Arnold in September 1934. In 1935 and 1936, he recorded four sequels designated "Milk Cow Blues No. 2" through No. 5. The song made Arnold a star, and was widely adapted by artists in the blues, Western swing and rock idioms. In June 2026, CBS News included the song in its list of the 250 essential American songs of the past 250 years.

== Kokomo Arnold song ==
=== Lyrical themes ===
The lyrics of the Kokomo Arnold record combine the threads of:

- Blues on awakening –

Good morning, Blues Blues how do you do?
Do mighty well this morning, can't get along with you.

- The loss of a dairy cow –

Says, I woke up this a-morning and I looked outdoors
Says, I knowed my mamlish milk cow pretty mama, Lord, by the way she lowed
Lord, if you see my milk cow, buddy, I said, please drive her home
Says, I ain't had no milk and butter, mama, Lord, since a-my cow been gone

- A breakup with his lover –

How can I do right, baby when you won't do right yourself?
Lord, if my good gal quits me well, I don't want nobody else

- A warning that she will have regrets –

Now you can read out your hymnbook, preach out your Bible
Fall down on your knees and pray, the good Lord to help you
Because you going to need you going to need my help some day
Mama if you can't quit your sinning please quit your lowdown ways. (Note: The words of the first two verses of Bob Dylan's "Quit Your Low Down Ways" are closely similar to this stanza.)

These four themes are found in the lyrics of later versions of the song.

The metaphor of a milk cow for a female lover was already established in recordings with the same title (see below). It is also found in "Mean Tight Mama" by Sara Martin in 1928:

Now my hair is nappy and I don’t wear no clothes of silk
But the cow that’s black and ugly has often got the sweetest milk

and in "My Black Mama Part 1" by Son House in 1930, also in a four-line verse, but one formed by repetition:

Well, you see my milk cow tell her to hurry home
I ain’t had no milk since that cow been gone
If you see my milk cow tell her to hurry home
Yeah, I ain’t had no milk since that cow been gone

=== Melody ===
Arnold uses basically two melodic structures, according to the number of lines in a verse. For three-line verses such as the following, he sings a melody interspersed by guitar in the first two lines:

All in good morning, I said, “Blues, how do you do?”
All in good morning, I said, “Blues, how do you do?”
You’re mighty rare this mornin’, can’t get along with you.

For four line verses such as the following, he sings the first two lines to a melody uninterrupted by guitar:

Takes a rockin’ chair to rock, mommy, a rubber ball to roll,
Takes a tall cheesin’ black, pretty mommy, to pacify my soul.
Lord, I don’t feel welcome, please, no place I go,
Oh that woman that I love, mommy, have done drove me from her door.

In the section described by Elijah Wald as a 'bridge", he modifies this four-line melody, most notable with falsetto leaps on the words "need" and "please":

Now you can read out your hymnbook, preach out your Bible,
Fall on your knees and pray, the good Lord will help you.
Cause you gonna need, gonna need my help someday.
Mama, if you can’t quit your sinnin’, please quit your lowdown ways.

These three melodies, and the device of a falsetto leap were used in the following versions of the song.

== Other songs with the same title ==
The earliest documented recording of a song titled "Milk Cow Blues" was by Freddie Spruell in 1926. The lyrics are largely on the lost dairy cow theme:

She's a full-blood Jersey, I'm going to tell you boys the way I know
People just screamin' for my milk cow, I don't care where my Jersey go

with one hint at a lost lover:

Say my bed is lonesome my pillow now it sure won't do
I wake up out of the midnight I really have those milk cow blues

A different song was recorded by Sleepy John Estes in 1930. The lyrics make no mention of a cow, and the relationship with a lover are not hostile but encouraging:

Well, she looked at me, she began to smile
Says, I thought I would use you for my man a while
That's if you just don't let my husband catch you there
Now, if just-just don't let my husband catch you there

There is some similarity between the melody used by Estes and the melody used by Arnold for his four-line verses of his record. Some have concluded that Estes's song is an earlier version of the same song. This is disputed by Boyd and Kelly.

Another different song was recorded by Big Bill Broonzy in March 1934. Melodically it differs from all the songs with the same title. Lyrically, it shares with the Kokomo Arnold song:

- A dairy cow theme –

I haven't seen my milk cow in three long weeks today
I haven't had no rich cream, mama since my milk cow strayed away

Have you seen a big brown cow she have no horns at all
You don't need a chair to milk her she will back right in your stall

- and a departed human lover –

When I got up this morning she had had every dime I had
I said that's all right, mule cow your daddy understand

== Robert Johnson song ==
Robert Johnson recorded a version of Sleepy John Estes' song, re-titled "Milkcow's Calf Blues", at his last recording session on June 20, 1937. It was released by Vocalion Records in September 1937 as the B-side to "Malted Milk."

== Johnnie Lee Wills version ==
In 1941, Johnnie Lee Wills (younger brother of Bob Wills) recorded a version which was released the same year by Decca Records as "Milkcow Blues" by Johnny [sic] Lee Wills & His Boys. It was sung by Cotton Thompson. Bob Wills also recorded it on the Tiffany Transcriptions with a vocal by Tommy Duncan. The Wills/Duncan release "Brain Cloudy Blues" is heavily influenced by "Milk Cow Blues" too.

== Elvis Presley version ==
"Milkcow Blues Boogie"

Single by Elvis Presley, Scotty, and Bill
- B-side: "You're a Heartbreaker"
- Released: January 8, 1955
- Recorded: November or December 1954
- Studio: Sun, Memphis
- Genre: Rockabilly
- Length: 2:39
- Label: Sun
- Songwriter: Kokomo Arnold

Elvis Presley, Scotty, and Bill singles chronology
"Good Rockin' Tonight" (1954)	"Milkcow Blues Boogie" (1955)	"Baby, Let's Play House" (1955)

Elvis Presley, on guitar, accompanied by Scotty Moore on guitar and Bill Black on double bass, recorded a rockabilly version retitled "Milkcow Blues Boogie" at Sun Records in November or December 1954. The arrangement was closer to Wills' version than to the Arnold original. Elvis begins the song as a slow ballad, then adds a spoken interlude by halting after the first four lines: "Hold it, fellas! That don't MOVE me! Let's get real, real gone for a change," prompting the trio to kick it into rockabilly gear.

Sun Records released the song as a single on January 8, 1955, with "You're a Heartbreaker" as the flipside. RCA Victor Records also released the single in December 1955. It was later included on Presley's 1959 album A Date with Elvis.

=== Personnel ===
- Elvis Presley – lead vocals, acoustic rhythm guitar
- Scotty Moore – electric lead guitar
- Bill Black – double bass
