= Slide guitar =

Guitar technique

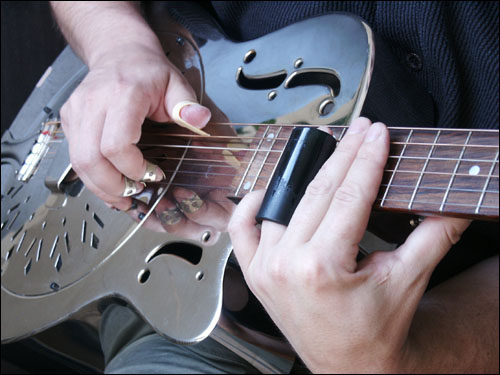
A musician playing slide guitar style. The slide is on his left ring finger. He is playing a National-type metal-body resonator guitar using fingerpicks on his right hand.

Slide guitar is a technique for playing the guitar that is often used in blues music. It involves playing a guitar while holding a hard object (a slide) against the strings, creating the opportunity for glissando effects and deep vibratos that reflect characteristics of the human singing voice. It typically involves playing the guitar in the traditional position (flat against the body) with the use of a slide fitted on one of the guitarist's fingers. The slide may be a metal or glass tube, such as the neck of a bottle, giving rise to the term bottleneck guitar to describe this type of playing. The strings are typically plucked (not strummed) while the slide is moved over the strings to change the pitch. The guitar may also be placed on the player's lap and played with a hand-held bar (lap steel guitar).

Creating music with a slide of some type has been traced back to African stringed instruments and also to the origin of the steel guitar in Hawaii. Near the beginning of the 20th century, blues musicians in the Mississippi Delta popularized the bottleneck slide guitar style, and the first recording of slide guitar was by Sylvester Weaver in 1923. Since the 1930s, performers including Robert Johnson, Robert Nighthawk, Earl Hooker, Elmore James, and Muddy Waters popularized slide guitar in electric blues and influenced later slide guitarists in rock music, including the Rolling Stones, George Harrison, Duane Allman, and Ry Cooder. Lap slide guitar pioneers include Oscar "Buddy" Woods, "Black Ace" Turner, and Freddie Roulette.

== History ==
"Traveling Riverside Blues"
First 29 seconds of Robert Johnson's "Traveling Riverside Blues"

The technique of using a hard object against a plucked string goes back to the diddley bow derived from a one-stringed African instrument. The diddley bow is believed to be one of the ancestors of the bottleneck style. When sailors from Europe introduced the Spanish guitar to Hawaii in the latter nineteenth century, the Hawaiians slackened some of the strings from the standard guitar tuning to make a chord – this became known as "slack-key" guitar, today referred to as an open tuning. With the "slack-key" the Hawaiians found it easy to play a three-chord song by moving a piece of metal along the fretboard and began to play the instrument across the lap. Near the end of the nineteenth century, a Hawaiian named Joseph Kekuku became proficient in playing this way using a steel bar against the guitar strings. The bar was called the "steel" and was the source of the name "steel guitar". Kekuku popularized the method and some sources claim he originated the technique. In the first half of the twentieth century, this so-called "Hawaiian guitar" style of playing spread to the US. Sol Hoʻopiʻi was an influential Hawaiian guitarist who in 1919, at age 17, came to the US mainland from Hawaii as a stow-away on a ship heading for San Francisco. Hoʻopiʻi's playing became popular in the late 1920s and he recorded songs like "Hula Blues" and "Farewell Blues". According to author Pete Madsen, "[Hoʻopiʻi's playing] would influence a legion of players from rural Mississippi."

Most players of blues slide guitar were from the southern US, particularly the Mississippi Delta, and their music was likely from an African origin handed down to African-American sharecroppers who sang as they toiled in the fields. The earliest Delta blues musicians were largely solo singer-guitarists. W. C. Handy commented on the first time he heard slide guitar in 1903, when a blues player performed in a local train station: "As he played, he pressed a knife on the strings of the guitar in a manner popularized by Hawaiian guitarists who used steel bars. The effect was unforgettable." Blues historian Gérard Herzhaft notes that Tampa Red was one of the first black musicians inspired by the Hawaiian guitarists of the beginning of the century, and he managed to adapt their sound to the blues. Tampa Red, as well as Kokomo Arnold, Casey Bill Weldon, and Oscar Woods adopted the Hawaiian mode of playing longer melodies with the slide instead of playing short riffs as they had done previously.

In the early 20th century, steel guitar playing was divided into two streams: bottleneck-style, performed on a traditional Spanish guitar held flat against the body; and lap-style, performed on an instrument specifically designed or modified for the purpose of being played on the performer's lap. The bottleneck-style was typically associated with blues music and was popularized by African-American blues artists. The Mississippi Delta was the home of Robert Johnson, Son House, Charlie Patton, and other blues pioneers who prominently used the slide. The first known recording of the bottleneck style was in 1923 by Sylvester Weaver who recorded two instrumentals, "Guitar Blues" and "Guitar Rag". (Note: Sylvester Weaver's 1923 "Guitar Rag" was adapted by Western swing pioneers Bob Wills and Leon McAuliffe in 1935 for the influential instrumental "Steel Guitar Rag".) Guitarist and author Woody Mann identifies Tampa Red and Blind Willie Johnson as "developing the most distinctive styles in the recorded idom" of the time. He adds:

Johnson was the first such player to achieve a real balance between treble and bass melodic lines, which acted as complementary voices in his arrangements of Baptist spirituals ... Tampa Red's [playing was] innovative for the late 1920s ... Thanks to his distinctive approach and suave sound, the Chicago-based Red became the most influential bottleneck player of the blues age, his smooth-sound work echoing in the playing of Blind Boy Fuller, Robert Nighthawk, Elmore James, and Muddy Waters.

== Influential early electric slide guitarists ==
When the guitar was electrified in the 1930s, it allowed solos on the instrument to be more audible, and thus more prominently featured. In the 1940s, players like Robert Nighthawk and Earl Hooker popularized electric slide guitar; but, unlike their predecessors, they used standard tuning. This allowed them to switch between slide and fretted guitar playing readily, which was an advantage in rhythm accompaniment.

=== Robert Nighthawk ===
Robert Nighthawk (born Robert Lee McCollum) recorded extensively in the 1930s as "Robert Lee McCoy" with bluesmen such as John Lee "Sonny Boy" Williamson (also known as Sonny Boy Williamson I). He performed on acoustic guitar in a style influenced by Tampa Red. Sometime around World War II, after changing his last name to "Nighthawk" (from the title of one of his songs), he became an early proponent of electric slide guitar and adopted a metal slide. Nighthawk's sound was extremely clean and smooth, with a very light touch of the slide against the strings. He helped popularize Tampa Red's "Black Angel Blues" (later called "Sweet Little Angel"), "Crying Won't Help You", and "Anna Lou Blues" (as "Anna Lee") in his electric slide style-songs which later became part of the repertoire of Earl Hooker, B.B. King, and others. His style influenced both Muddy Waters and Hooker. Nighthawk is credited as one who helped bring music from Mississippi into the Chicago blues style of electric blues.

=== Earl Hooker ===
As a teenager, Earl Hooker (a cousin of John Lee Hooker) sought out Nighthawk as his teacher and in the late 1940s the two toured the South extensively. Nighthawk had a lasting impact on Hooker's playing; however, by the time of his 1953 recording of "Sweet Angel" (a tribute of sorts to Nighthawk's "Sweet Little Angel"), Hooker had developed an advanced style of his own. His solos had a resemblance to the human singing voice and music writer Andy Grigg commented: "He had the uncanny ability to make his guitar weep, moan and talk just like a person ... his slide playing was peerless, even exceeding his mentor, Robert Nighthawk." The vocal approach is heard in Hooker's instrumental, "Blue Guitar", which was later overdubbed with a unison vocal by Muddy Waters and became "You Shook Me". Unusual for a blues player, Hooker explored using a wah-wah pedal in the 1960s to further emulate the human voice.

=== Elmore James ===
Elmore James' "Dust My Broom"
21 second sample of James' repeating slide triplets figure

Possibly the most influential electric blues slide guitarist of his era was Elmore James, who gained prominence with his 1951 song "Dust My Broom", a remake of Robert Johnson's 1936 song, "I Believe I'll Dust My Broom". It features James playing a series of triplets throughout the song which Rolling Stone magazine called "one immortal lick" and is heard in many blues songs to this day. Although Johnson had used the figure on several songs, James' overdriven electric sound made it "more insistent, firing out a machine-gun triplet beat that would become a defining sound of the early rockers", writes historian Ted Gioia. Unlike Nighthawk and Hooker, James used a full-chord glissando effect with an open E tuning and a bottleneck. Other popular songs by James, such as "It Hurts Me Too" (first recorded by Tampa Red), "The Sky Is Crying", "Shake Your Moneymaker", feature his slide playing.

=== Muddy Waters ===
Although Muddy Waters, born McKinley Morganfield, made his earliest recordings using an acoustic slide guitar, as a guitarist, he was best known for his electric slide playing. Muddy Waters helped bring the Delta blues to Chicago and was instrumental in defining the city's electric blues style. He was also one of the pioneers of electric slide guitar. Beginning with "I Can't Be Satisfied" (1948), many of his hit songs featured slide, including "Rollin' and Tumblin'", "Rollin' Stone" (whose name was adopted by the well-known rock band and the magazine), "Louisiana Blues", and "Still a Fool". Waters used an open G tuning for several of his earlier songs, but later switched to a standard tuning and often used a capo to change keys. He usually played single notes with a small metal slide on his little finger and dampened the strings combined with varying the volume to control the amount of distortion. According to writer Ted Drozdowski, "One last factor to consider is slide vibrato that is achieved by shaking a slide back and forth. Muddy’s slide vibrato was insane, both manic and controlled. That added to the excitement of his playing."

== Early developments in rock music ==
Rock musicians began exploring electric slide guitar in the early 1960s. In the UK, groups such as the Rolling Stones, who were fans of Chicago blues and Chess Records artists in particular, began recording songs by Muddy Waters, Howlin' Wolf, and others. The Stones' second single, "I Wanna Be Your Man" (1963), featured a slide guitar break by Brian Jones, which may be the first appearance of a slide on a rock record. Critic Richie Unterberger commented, "Particularly outstanding was Brian Jones's slide guitar, whose wailing howl gave the tune a raunchy bluesiness missing in the Beatles' more straightforward rock 'n' roll arrangement." Jones also played slide on their 1964 single "Little Red Rooster", which reached number one on the British charts. One of his last contributions to a Stones recording was his acoustic guitar slide playing on "No Expectations", which biographer Paul Trynka describes as "subtle, totally without bombast or overemphasis ... the perfect embodiment of the journey he'd embarked on in 1961."

In Chicago, Mike Bloomfield frequented blues clubs as early as the late 1950s – by the early 1960s Muddy Waters and harmonica virtuoso Little Walter encouraged him and occasionally allowed him to sit in on jam sessions. Waters recalled: "Mike was a great guitar player. He learned a lot of slide from me. Plus I guess he picked up a little lick or two from me, but he learned how to play a lot of slide and pick a lot of guitar." Bloomfield's slide playing attracted Paul Butterfield and, together with guitarist Elvin Bishop, they formed the classic lineup of the Paul Butterfield Blues Band. Their first album, The Paul Butterfield Blues Band (1965), features Bloomfield's slide guitar work on the band's adaptations of two Elmore James songs. "Shake Your Moneymaker" shows his well-developed slide style and "Look Over Yonders Wall" is ranked at number 27 on Rolling Stone magazine's list of the "100 Greatest Guitar Songs of All Time". Around the same time, he recorded with Bob Dylan for the Highway 61 Revisited album and contributed the distinctive slide guitar to the title track. On the second Butterfield album, East-West (1966), songs such as "Walkin' Blues" and "Two Trains Running" include slide playing that brought him to the audience's attention.

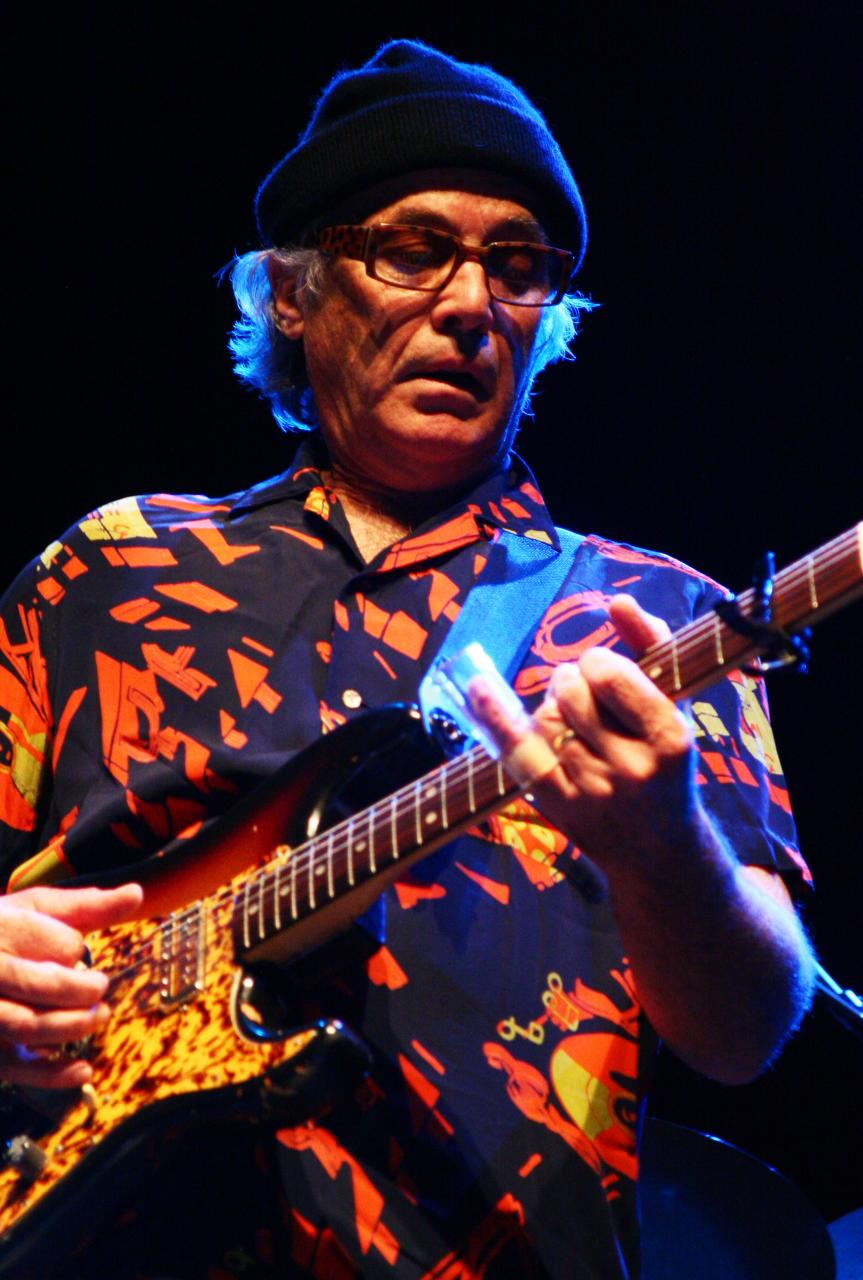
Ry Cooder using a glass slide in 2009

Ry Cooder was a child music prodigy and at age 15 began working on bottleneck guitar techniques and learned Robert Johnson songs. In 1964, Cooder, along with Taj Mahal, formed the Rising Sons, one of the earliest blues rock bands. His early guitar work appears on Captain Beefheart's debut Safe as Milk album (1967) and several songs on Taj Mahal's self-titled 1968 debut album. Also in 1968, he collaborated with the Rolling Stones on recording sessions, which resulted in Cooder playing slide on "Memo from Turner". The Jagger/Richards song was later included on the soundtrack to the 1970 film Performance; Rolling Stone included it at number 92 on its "100 Greatest Guitar Songs of All Time" list. In 1970, he recorded his own self titled debut album, which included the Blind Willie Johnson classic slide instrumental "Dark Was the Night, Cold Was the Ground" (re-recorded in 1984 for the soundtrack to Paris, Texas). Recognized as a master of slide guitar by 1967, Rolling Stone magazine ranked him at number eight on their list of the "100 Greatest Guitarists of All Time" in 2003.

Duane Allman’s slide-playing with the Allman Brothers Band was one of the formative influences in the creation of Southern rock. He also added memorable slide guitar to Derek and the Dominos’ Layla and Other Assorted Love Songs album, notably its title track, which was ranked at number 13 on Rolling Stone's "100 Greatest Guitar Songs". Allman, who died in a motorcycle accident at age 24, was hailed by NPR's Nick Morrison as "the most inventive slide guitarist of his era". He extended the role of the slide guitar by mimicking the harmonica effects of Sonny Boy Williamson II, most clearly in the Allman Brothers' rendition of Williamson's "One Way Out", recorded live at the Fillmore East and heard on their album Eat a Peach.

== Technique ==
The slide guitar, according to music educator Keith Wyatt, can be thought of as a "one-finger fretless guitar". The placement of a slide on a string determines the pitch, functioning in the manner of a steel guitar. The slide is pressed lightly against the treble strings to avoid hitting against the frets. The frets are used here only as a visual reference, and playing without their pitch-constraint enables the smooth expressive glissandos that typify blues music. This playing technique creates a hybrid of the attributes of a steel guitar and a traditional guitar in that the player's remaining (non-slide) fingers and thumb still have access to the frets, and may be used for playing rhythmic accompaniment or reaching additional notes. The guitar itself may be tuned in the traditional tuning or an open tuning. Most early blues players used open tunings, but most modern slide players use both. The major limitation of open tuning is that usually only one chord or voicing is easily available and is dictated by how the guitar is originally tuned. Two-note intervals can be played by slanting the slide on certain notes.

In the sixteenth century, the notes of A–D–G–B–E were adopted as a tuning for guitar-like instruments, and the low E was added later to make E–A–D–G–B–E as the standard guitar tuning. In open tuning the strings are tuned to sound a chord when not fretted, and is most often major. Open tunings commonly used with slide guitar include open D or Vestapol (Note: "Vestapol" was the name of a song written in open D tuning for parlor guitar in the 1850s. The name of the song became associated with that tuning.) tuning: D–A–D–F♯–A–D; and open G or Spanish tuning: D–G–D–G–B–D. Open E and open A, formed by raising each of those tunings a whole tone, are also common. Other tunings are also used, in particular the drop D tuning (low E string tuned down to D) is used by many slide players. This tuning allows for power chords, which contain root, fifth and eighth (octave) notes in the bass strings and conventional tuning for the rest of the strings. Robert Johnson, whose playing has been cited by Eric Clapton, Keith Richards, Jimi Hendrix, and Johnny Winter as being a powerful influence on them, used tunings of standard, open G, open D, and drop D.

== Resonator guitars ==
The National String Instrument Corporation produced the first metal-body resonator guitars in the late 1920s (see image at beginning of article). Popular with early slide players, these featured a large aluminum cone, resembling an inverted loudspeaker, attached under the instrument's bridge to increase its volume. It was patented in the late 1920s by the Dopyera brothers and became widely used on many types of guitars, and was adapted to the mandolin and ukulele.

Tampa Red played a gold-plated National Tricone style 4, and was one of the first black musicians to record with it. Delta blues pioneer, Son House, played this type of guitar on many songs including the classic, "Death Letter". A resonator guitar with a metal body was played by Bukka White ("Parchman Farm Blues" and "Fixin' to Die Blues" (Note: The song "Fixin' to Die Blues", recorded by Bukka White in 1940 in Chicago, was inducted into the Grammy Hall of Fame in 2012)).

== Lap slide guitar ==
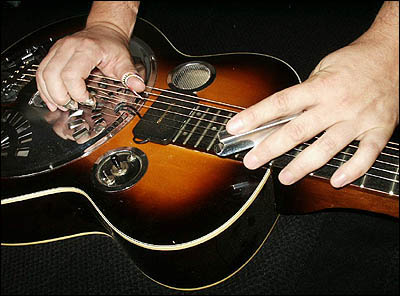
Wooden resonator guitar played with a steel, angled to form a chord unavailable from straight open tuning.

"Lap slide guitar" does not refer to a specific instrument, rather a style of playing blues or rock music with the guitar placed horizontally, a position historically known as Hawaiian style. This is a lap-steel guitar, but musicians in these genres prefer the term slide instead of steel; they sometimes play the style with a flat pick or with fingers instead of finger picks. There are various instruments specifically made (or adapted) to play in the horizontal position, including the following:

- a traditional guitar that has been adapted for lap slide playing by raising the bridge and/or the nut to make the strings higher off the fretboard;
- steel guitars, (electrified) including lap steel, console steel, and pedal steel, in which a solid metal bar, typically referred to as a "steel", is pressed against the strings and is the source of the name steel guitar;
- a National or Dobro-type guitar. These are typically acoustic steel guitars with a resonator. Each manufacturer made wood and steel-bodied versions, but National is most associated with the latter. The types do not sound the same — the Nationals are brassier and are usually preferred by blues players. Nationals can be played either in the traditional position or horizontally.
- a Hawaiian-style guitar modified by adding drone and sympathetic strings used in Indian classical music known as a mohan veena.

== Lap slide guitar pioneers ==
Buddy Woods was a Louisiana street performer who recorded in the 1930s. He was called "The Lone Wolf" after the title of his most successful song, "Lone Wolf Blues". Between 1936 and 1938, he recorded ten songs that are today considered classics, including "Don't Sell It, Don't Give It Away". Woods recorded five songs for the US Library of Congress in 1940 in Shreveport, Louisiana, including "Boll Weevil Blues" and "Sometimes I Get a Thinkin'".

"Black Ace" Turner (born Babe Karo Turner), a blues artist from Texas, was befriended and mentored by Buddy Woods. Historian Gérard Herzhaft said, "Black Ace is one of the few blues guitarists to have played in the purest Hawaiian style, that is, with the guitar flat on the knees." Turner played a square-neck National "style 2" Tri-cone metal body guitar and used a glass medicine bottle as a slide. Turner was also a good storyteller, which enabled him to host a radio program in Fort Worth called The Black Ace. His career effectively ended when he entered military service in 1943. His album, I Am the Boss Card in Your Hand, contained Turner's original 1930s recordings as well as new songs recorded in 1960. Turner was featured in a 1962 documentary film entitled The Blues.

Freddie Roulette (born Frederick Martin Roulette) is a San Francisco-based lap steel blues artist who became interested in the lap steel guitar at an early age and became proficient enough to play in Chicago blues clubs with prominent players. He played an A7 tuning with a slant-bar style and never used finger picks. He earned a spot in Earl Hooker's band and recorded with Hooker in the 1960s. Roulette had played lap steel in other genres before focusing on blues – he stated this helped him add more complex chords to the basic blues played by Hooker and said, "it worked". Roulette was recruited to San Francisco in the mid-1970s by Charlie Musselwhite. In 1997, he recorded a solo album, Back in Chicago: Jammin' with Willie Kent and the Gents, which won Best Blues Album of 1997 by Living Blues Magazine. Roulette's contribution to the lap slide guitar was to prove that a lap-played instrument was capable of holding its own in Chicago blues style.

== Slides and steels ==
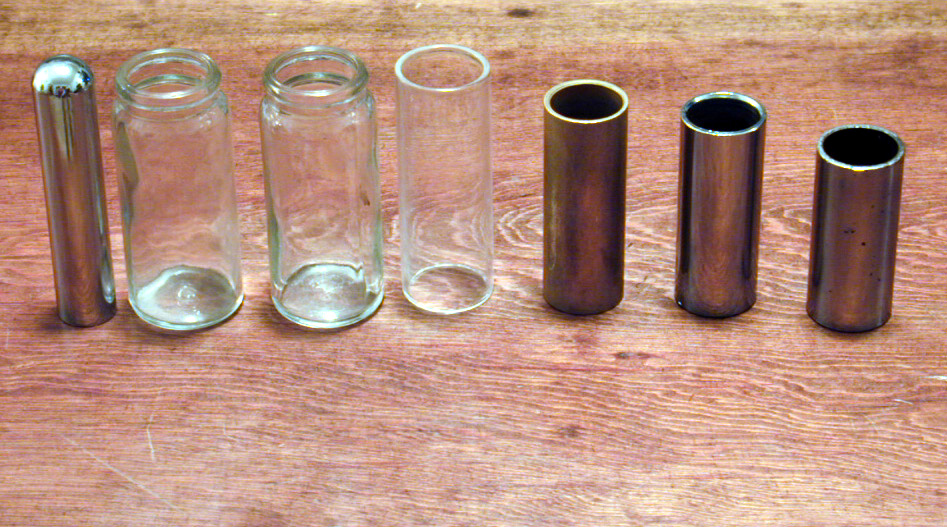
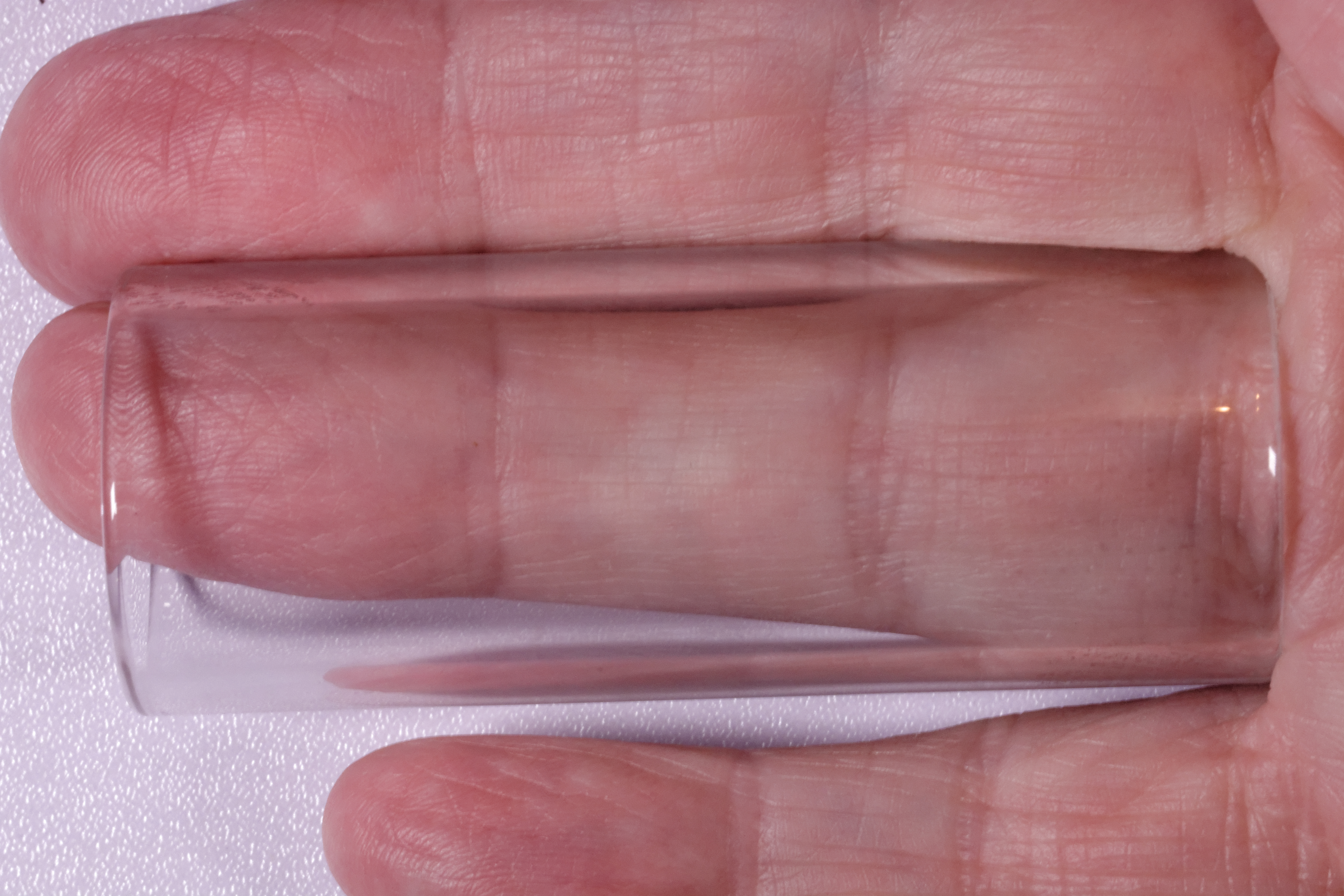
(Left): A collection of guitar slides. On the left is a "steel" used in lap playing. The next two are Coricidin medicine bottles from the late 1960s; followed by a polycarbonate tube and three metal tubes; (right): a glass slide on the ring finger

A slide used around a player's finger can be made with any type of smooth hard material that allows tones to resonate. Different materials cause subtle differences in sustain, timbre, and loudness; glass or metal are the most common choices. Longer slides are used to bridge across all six guitar strings at once, but take away the fretting ability of that finger entirely. A shorter slide allows the fingertip to protrude from the slide and allow that finger to be used to fret.

Improvised slides are common, including pipes, rings, knives, spoons, and glass bottlenecks. Early blues players sometimes used a knife, such as Blind Willie Johnson (pocket- or penknife) and CeDell Davis (butterknife). Duane Allman used a glass Coricidin medicine bottle. Pink Floyd founder Syd Barrett was fond of using a Zippo lighter as a slide, but this was largely for special effects. Jimi Hendrix also used a cigarette lighter for part of his solo on "All Along the Watchtower". It is one of the few recordings with Hendrix on slide, and biographer Harry Shapiro notes he performed it with the guitar on his lap.

For guitars designed to be played on the lap, the performer uses a solid piece of steel rather than a hollow tube. The choice of shape and size is a matter of personal preference. The most common steel is a solid metal cylinder with one end rounded into a dome shape. Some lap slide guitar players choose a steel with a deep indentation or groove on each side so it can be held firmly, and may have squared-off ends. The better grip may facilitate playing the rapid vibratos in blues music. This design facilitates hammer-on and pull-off notes.

== See also ==
- List of slide guitarists
