= Juke Boy Bonner =

American blues musician

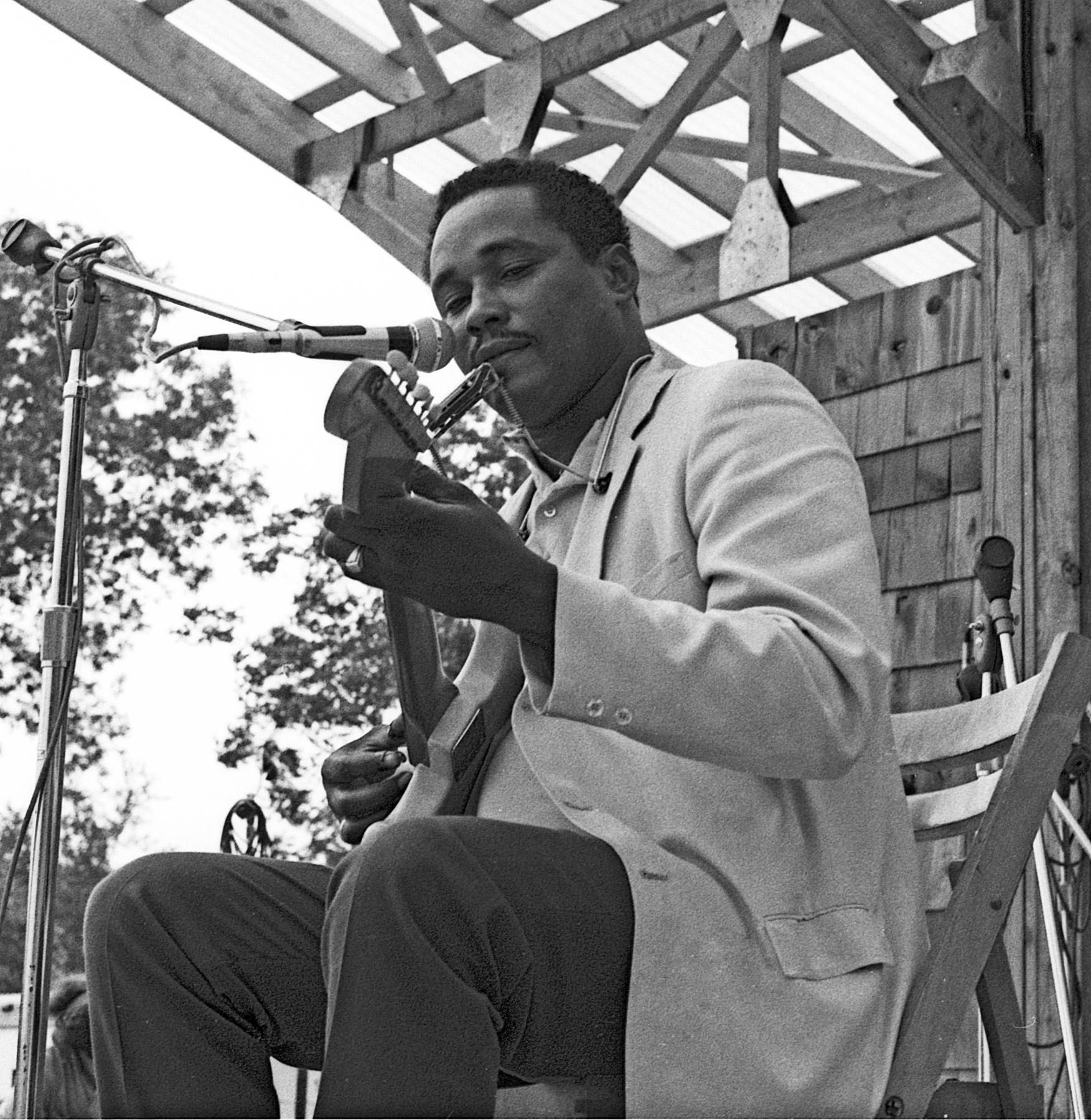
- Juke Boy Bonner at the 1970 Ann Arbor Blues Festival

Background information
- Born: Weldon Philip Bonner; March 22, 1932; Bellville, Texas, U.S.
- Died: June 29, 1978 (aged 46) Houston, Texas, U.S.
- Genres: Texas blues
- Occupations: Singer; one-man band
- Instruments: Guitar; harmonica; drums
- Years active: 1948–1978

Weldon H. Philip Bonner, better known as Juke Boy Bonner (March 22, 1932 – June 29, 1978) was an American blues singer, harmonica player, and guitarist. He was influenced by Lightnin' Hopkins, Jimmy Reed, and Slim Harpo. He accompanied himself on guitar, harmonica, and drums in songs such as "Going Back to the Country", "Life Is a Nightmare", and "Struggle Here in Houston".

== Career ==
Born in Bellville, Texas, Bonner was one of nine children; his parents died when he was very young. Raised by a neighbor's family, he moved in with his older sister in 1945. At the age of twelve he taught himself to play the guitar. He gained the nickname "Juke Boy" as a youth, because he frequently sang in local juke joints. Starting a musical career as a teenager, he won the first prize at local disc jockey Trummie Cain's weekly talent show at the Lincoln Theater in Houston, Texas in 1948. Through this he secured a 15-minute radio slot on a show operated by the record retailer Henry Atlas. After having three children with his wife, she left him to look after the children by himself.

Between 1954 and 1957, he recorded several singles for the Irma record label, based in Oakland, California, but not all were released at the time. In 1960 he recorded again, for Goldband Records, Storyville Records, and Jan & Dill Records.

In 1963 Bonner was diagnosed with a large stomach ulcer, and almost half of his stomach was removed by surgery. The shock of the operation, plus the social climate of the times (which included civil rights riots and the assassination of President John F. Kennedy), led Bonner to begin writing poetry, some of which was published in the Houston Forward Times, a weekly newspaper. Recovering from surgery, Bonner worked as an RCA record distributor in Houston. Once his strength returned he began playing gigs again in that area.

In 1967, Bonner recorded his first album for the Flyright Records. Chris Strachwitz's Arhoolie label released two albums, I'm Going Back to the Country (1968) and The Struggle (1969) (Arhoolie would later issue some of Bonner's unreleased 1967–1974 recordings on Ghetto Poet, in 2003). Bonner recorded mostly original song material through his recording career. He was a guest at the Ann Arbor Blues Festival, the American Folk Blues Festival, and the Montreux Blues and Rock Festival. He toured Europe in 1969 with Clifton Chenier and Magic Sam.

In 1972, he released an LP for Sonet Records, and in 1975 another one for the Houston-based Home Cooking Records. However, he was not able to support himself from his music, because of a lack of demand for his work. He continued to perform and record sporadically, but he had no choice but to take a minimum wage job at a chicken-processing plant in Houston.

== Death ==
Bonner's last performance was at a Juneteenth festival at Houston's Miller Outdoor Theatre. Less than two weeks later, on June 29, 1978, he died in his apartment, aged 46, of cirrhosis.

== Discography ==
=== Studio albums ===
- The One Man Trio (Flyright, 1967)
- I'm Going Back to the Country (Arhoolie, 1968)
- The Struggle (Arhoolie, 1969)
- Things Ain't Right (Liberty, 1969)
- The Legacy of the Blues, vol. 5 (Sonet, 1976)

=== Live album ===
- Last Live Recording (Juneteenth Blues Festival 1978) (Lunar, 1981)

=== Compilations ===
- The Adventures of Juke Boy Bonner in AuthentiCity (Home Cooking, 1980)
- The Texas Blues Troubadour (Home Cooking, 1989)
- They Call Me "Juke Boy" (Ace, 1989)
- Juke Boy Bonner 1960–1967 (Flyright, 1991)
- Life Gave Me a Dirty Deal (Arhoolie, 1993)
- Jumpin' with Juke Boy (Collectables, 1993)
- I Live Where the Action Is (Rockin' Blues, 1997)
- Ghetto Poet (Arhoolie, 2003)
- Nowhere to Run (Blues Factory, 2004)

== See also ==
- List of Texas blues musicians
- List of West Coast blues musicians
- List of electric blues musicians

== Sources ==
- Sheldon Harris. Blues Who's Who, Da Capo Press, 1981, ISBN 978-0306801556.
- Strachwitz, Chris & Skoog, Larry. (1968, 1992). Life Gave Me A Dirty Deal Audio CD (Liner notes). Arhoolie CD375.
