= Kokomo Arnold =

American blues musician

- Also known as: Gitfiddle Jim
- Born: James Arnold; February 15, 1896 or 1901; Lovejoy's Station, Georgia, U.S.
- Died: November 8, 1968 (aged 67–72) Chicago, Illinois, U.S.
- Genre: Blues
- Instruments: Vocals, slide guitar
- Years active: 1920s–1938
- Label: Decca

James "Kokomo" Arnold (February 15, 1896 or 1901 – November 8, 1968) was an American blues musician. A left-handed slide guitarist, his intense style of playing and rapid-fire vocal delivery set him apart from his contemporaries. He got his nickname in 1934 after releasing "Old Original Kokomo Blues" for Decca Records, a cover version of Scrapper Blackwell's blues song about the city of Kokomo, Indiana.

== Early life ==
Arnold was born in Lovejoy's Station, Georgia. Most sources give the date his birth as 1901, but the researchers Bob Eagle and Eric LeBlanc give the date as 1896, on the basis of information in the 1900 census. He learned the basics of playing the guitar from his cousin, John Wiggs.

== Career ==
Arnold began playing in the early 1920s as a sideline, when he was working as a farmhand in Buffalo, New York, and as a steelworker in Pittsburgh, Pennsylvania. In 1929 he moved to Chicago and ran a bootlegging business, an activity he continued until the end of Prohibition. In 1930 he moved south briefly and made his first recordings, "Rainy Night Blues" and "Paddlin' Madeline Blues", under the name Gitfiddle Jim, for the Victor label in Memphis. He soon moved back to Chicago, where he was forced to make a living as a musician after Prohibition ended in 1933. Kansas Joe McCoy heard him and introduced him to Mayo Williams, a producer for Decca Records.

From his first recording for Decca, on September 10, 1934, until his last, on May 12, 1938, Arnold made 88 sides, seven of which have been lost.

Arnold, Peetie Wheatstraw and Bumble Bee Slim were well-known musicians in Chicago blues circles at that time. Wheatstraw and Arnold, in particular, were also major influences on their contemporary, the Delta blues artist Robert Johnson. Johnson turned "Old Original Kokomo Blues" into "Sweet Home Chicago" and "Milk Cow Blues" into "Milkcow's Calf Blues". Another Arnold song, "Sagefield Woman Blues", introduced the phrase "dust my broom", which Johnson used as a song title.

Other notable songs include his 1934 recording of "Sissy Man Blues", with lyrics referring to bisexuality ("Lord, if you can't send me no woman, please send me some sissy man"). It was later recorded by other blues musicians of the era, including Josh White (as "Pinewood Tom"), George Noble and Connie McLean's Rhythm Boys.

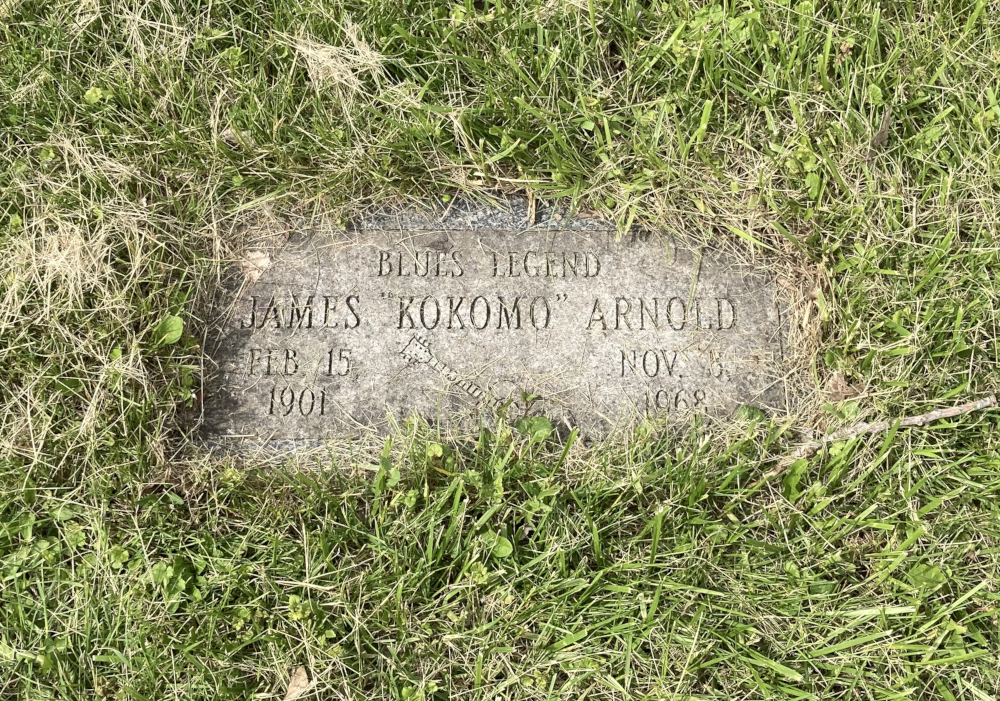
Arnold's grave at Burr Oak Cemetery

In 1938 Arnold left the music industry and began to work in a Chicago factory. Located by blues researchers in 1962, he showed no interest in returning to music to take advantage of the resurgence of interest in the blues among young white audiences. His song "Milk Cow Blues" was recorded by Cliff Bruner's Texas Wanderers (1937), Johnnie Lee Wills (brother of Bob Wills) (1941), Elvis Presley (1954), Ricky Nelson (1960), The Kinks (1965), Aerosmith (1977), and Willie Nelson (2000).

== Death ==
Arnold died of a heart attack in Chicago on November 8, 1968, aged either 67 or 72, and was buried in Burr Oak Cemetery, in Alsip, Illinois.

== Discography ==
- Kokomo Arnold (Saydisc Matchbox, 1969)
- Masters of the Blues, vol. 4 (Collector's Classics, 1970)
- Bad Luck Blues 1934–1938 (MCA, 1974)
- Master of the Bottleneck Guitar 1930–38 (Document, 1987)
- Down and Out Blues (Agram, 1990)
- Complete Recorded Works in Chronological Order 1930–1938, vols. 1–4 (Document, 1991)
- King of the Bottleneck Guitar 1934–1937 (Black & Blue, 1991)
- Blues Classics, vol. 1 (Wolf, 1997)
- Old Original Kokomo Blues (P-Vine, 1997)
- Old Original Kokomo Blues 1934–1938 (EPM, 1998)
- Old Original Kokomo Blues (Catfish, 1999)
- Midnight Blues (History, 2000)
- The Essential Kokomo Arnold (Document, 2001)
- The Story of the Blues (Membran Music, 2004)

== See also ==
- List of Chicago blues musicians
- List of slide guitarists
