= Whistlin' Alex Moore =

American blues musician (1899–1989)

- Born: Alexander Herman Moore; November 22, 1899; Dallas, Texas, U.S.
- Died: January 20, 1989 (aged 89) Dallas, Texas, U.S.
- Genres: Blues; boogie-woogie
- Occupations: Musician; songwriter
- Instruments: Piano; vocals
- Years active: 1920s–1989
- Labels: Arhoolie; Document; Rounder; Columbia

Alexander Herman "Whistlin' Alex" Moore (November 22, 1899 – January 20, 1989), was an American blues pianist, singer and whistler. He is best remembered for his recordings of "Blue Bloomer Blues" (which he first recorded in 1929, as well as later in life), "Across the Atlantic Ocean" and "Black Eyed Peas and Hog Jowls".

== Early life ==
Moore was born in Dallas, Texas. At the age of three, his family moved to El Paso, Texas, but returned to Dallas three years later for his father's job, who was a professional candy maker. Although his family did not own a piano Moore learned the instrument by watching others, including a female cousin, and practicing on instruments he found around town. He also learned to play harmonica as a boy, and was a tap dancer and whistler. He took a more serious interest in playing piano in his mid-teens, although he never learned how to read music. In 1915 he performed on Dallas radio station WWR, and continued to play for tips at various social gathering places, including chockhouses (homes or stores where home-brewed alcohol was served) and juke joints in Dallas.

After his father's death, he dropped out of school to support his mother and two siblings. He had become proficient on the piano before entering the United States Army in 1916. His overall sound during the 1920s combined elements of the blues, ragtime, barrelhouse boogie, and stride. Also in the 1920s he acquired his nickname, based on a whistle he made while playing the piano.

== Career ==
In 1929, he made his debut recordings for Columbia Records. The records he made did not sell in great quantities, and Moore did not record again until 1937, when a few of his songs were issued by Decca Records.

It was 1951 before Moore recorded again, with RPM Records/Kent. However, throughout the 1940s and 1950s, he performed in clubs in Dallas and occasionally other parts of Texas. Arhoolie Records signed him to a recording contract in 1960, and the subsequent recordings brought him nationwide recognition.

During the 1960s, Moore played at clubs and festivals in the United States and a few festivals in Europe. He toured with the American Folk Blues Festival in 1969, performing on the same bill as Earl Hooker and Magic Sam. The same year he recorded a session in Stuttgart, Germany, which led to the release of the album Alex Moore in Europe. He did not record again in either the 1970s or 1980s, but he continued to give live performances until his death. He remembered and sang again the blues he had recorded in the 1920s and 1930s, such as "West Texas Woman" and "Blue Bloomer Blues", with their touching and poetic lyrics.

In 1987, Moore was granted a National Heritage Fellowship by the National Endowment for the Arts, becoming the first African-American Texan to receive such an honor.

The year before his death, he recorded the album Wiggle Tail, his final session for Rounder Records. On November 22, 1988, the state of Texas designated his birthday Alex Moore Day.

Although Moore played the piano for audiences around the world, he never considered himself a professional musician. Throughout the course of his adult life, his nonmusical jobs included hauling gravel, driving mule teams, washing dishes, working as a hotel porter, and as a custodian at office buildings. He retired from the last of those jobs in 1965.

== Personal ==
Moore died of a heart attack on January 20, 1989 in Dallas, aged 89. He never married; he was survived by a son and daughter. He was interred at the Lincoln Memorial Cemetery in Dallas.

== Legacy ==
Music journalist Tony Russell wrote that "Moore was so odd a performer that some newcomers to the blues have been uncertain whether to take him seriously. By the time he became moderately well-known on the international blues scene of the 1960s and 1970s; his always singular style had burgeoned into florid eccentricity, and he would reminisce tirelessly in a foggy half-shout about youthful high times in his hometown, over skipping blues and boogie-woogie piano patterns with occasional bursts of shrill whistling."

== Selected discography ==
- Wiggle Tail (1988)
- Whistlin' Alex Moore (1994)
- From North Dallas to the East Side (1994)
- Ice Pick Blues (1995)
