= Chris Strachwitz =

American record label executive (1931–2023)

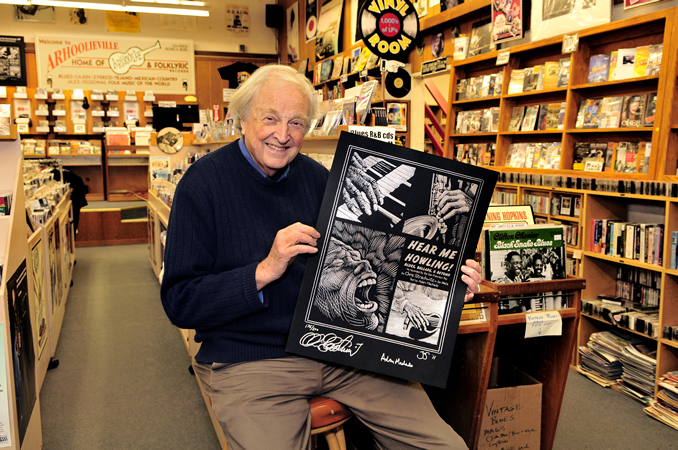
- Strachwitz in 2000

Background information
- Born: Christian Alexander Maria, Graf Strachwitz von Groß-Zauche und Camminetz; July 1, 1931; Groß Reichenau, Germany - today Bogaczów, Poland
- Died: May 5, 2023 (aged 91) San Rafael, California, U.S.
- Occupations: Record company executive, record producer
- Years active: 1952–2023
- Website: chrisstrachwitz.blogspot.com

Christian Alexander Maria Graf Strachwitz von Groß-Zauche und Camminetz (/ˈstrɑːkwɪts/; July 1, 1931 – May 5, 2023) was a German-born American record label executive and record producer. He was the founder and president of Arhoolie Records, which he established in 1960 and which became one of the leading labels recording and issuing blues, Cajun, norteño, and other forms of roots music from the United States and elsewhere in the world. Strachwitz despised most commercial music as mouse music.

== Early life ==
Strachwitz was born in Groß Reichenau, Germany - today Bogaczów, Poland. In 1945, under the terms of the Potsdam Agreement after World War II, he and his family were among the millions of German-speaking people forcibly resettled to the west of the Oder-Neisse line which became the eastern boundary of Germany. The Strachwitz family settled temporarily with relatives in Braunschweig, in the British zone of Allied-occupied Germany, where he first heard swing music played on Armed Forces Radio.

In 1947, the family emigrated to the United States, moving first to Reno, Nevada, and then to Santa Barbara, California. Strachwitz attended Cate School in nearby Carpinteria. He became interested in jazz after seeing the movie New Orleans, starring Billie Holiday and Louis Armstrong, and began collecting jazz records. He stated in a 2010 interview:

The rhythms haunted me.... I'd hear all this stuff on the radio, and it just knocked me over. I thought this was absolutely the most wonderful thing I had ever heard.

After graduating from Cate in 1951, he attended Pomona College in Claremont, and started visiting jazz clubs in Los Angeles as well as rhythm and blues shows featuring Lightnin' Hopkins, Howlin' Wolf and others. He began taping the radio broadcasts and live shows of his friend, jazz musician Frank Demond, before enrolling in 1952 at UC Berkeley, where he booked jazz and R&B performers as entertainment at football games.

Strachwitz became a United States citizen and was drafted into the U.S. Army in 1954, just after the Korean War, being stationed in Salzburg, Austria, from where he continued to see touring jazz shows. After finishing his service he returned to Berkeley, completing his studies in engineering, mathematics and physics, and then taking a degree in political science and an advanced degree in secondary education in 1960. At the same time, he continued to develop his technical skills, learning from established producer Bob Geddins and through recording San Francisco street musician Jesse Fuller, jazz saxophonist Sonny Simmons and others. He also worked as a high school teacher in Los Gatos for three years from 1959.

== Arhoolie Records ==
In summer 1959, he made a trip to Houston, Texas, intending to visit his hero, Lightnin' Hopkins. Although unable to record Hopkins at the time due to lack of money and equipment, he resolved to return to the area the following year. With the proceeds from trading in 78 rpm records, he bought new recording equipment, set up the Arhoolie label, and in 1960 returned to Texas where, with the assistance of "Mack" McCormick, he recorded Mance Lipscomb for the first time. Lipscomb's album, Texas Sharecropper and Songster, became Arhoolie's first release in November 1960, in an edition of 250 copies. The name "Arhoolie" was suggested by McCormick, deriving from a word for a field holler. Strachwitz also recorded "Black Ace" Turner, "Li'l Son" Jackson and Whistlin' Alex Moore on the same trip, and later in the year recorded Big Joe Williams and Mercy Dee Walton in California.

Strachwitz also began reissuing archive material, both of R&B singers such as Big Joe Turner and Lowell Fulson who had recorded for the defunct Swingtime label, and old country and western recordings on his Old Timey label, started in 1962. He stopped teaching that year and moved back to Berkeley, to devote himself to developing the record business. He also continued travelling to make field recordings of blues musicians, notably Mississippi Fred McDowell (whom he first recorded in 1964), Juke Boy Bonner, K. C. Douglas, and Clifton Chenier. From 1965, he also hosted a Sunday afternoon music program on Pacifica Radio's KPFA-FM in Berkeley, California, which ran until 1995.

In 1965, his friend ED Denson introduced him to a local band, Country Joe and the Fish, who were active in anti-Vietnam war protests at Berkeley. Strachwitz recorded the band singing "I Feel Like I'm Fixin' to Die", and gained a share of the song's publishing rights. Eventually, royalties from the song—particularly its appearance in the Woodstock Festival movie and soundtrack album—helped subsidize the Arhoolie label, and enabled Strachwitz to buy a building on San Pablo Avenue in El Cerrito, California, as the label's headquarters. Strachwitz also won royalties for Fred McDowell from the Rolling Stones' performance of his song "You Gotta Move" on their Sticky Fingers album.

During the 1970s, Strachwitz continued to record blues musicians, including Big Joe Duskin, Charlie Musselwhite, Big Mama Thornton, Elizabeth Cotten, and Robben Ford, as well as Cajun and zydeco performers such as Clifton Chenier, Lawrence Ardoin and John Delafose. He also continued to secure the rights to release archive blues material such as that by Snooks Eaglin and Robert Pete Williams. In the 1980s and 1990s, he continued to develop Arhoolie as a distributor of smaller independent blues labels, and an importer of jazz and blues releases on European labels.

Strachwitz also increasingly focused attention on Mexican and, specifically, norteño music, which he had long admired, building up what is believed to be the largest private collection of Mexican-American and Mexican music. The first such album on Arhoolie was Conjuntos Norteños, by Los Pinguinos del Norte, released in 1970, but one of his biggest successes came with Flaco Jiménez, whose album Ay Te Dejo en San Antonio won a Grammy Award in 1986. With cinematographer Les Blank, he also made two documentaries about the music in the mid 1970s, Chulas Fronteras and Del Mero Corazon. He discovered and released the first two albums of seminal klezmer revival band The Klezmorim. Another of Strachwitz's discoveries, and one of his biggest commercial successes, was Cajun musician Michael Doucet and his group BeauSoleil. In 2013, Strachwitz saw HowellDevine performing live and signed them to Arhoolie for the two albums that followed.

In late 2023, the Arhoolie Foundation published the book Down Home Music: The Stories and Photographs of Chris Strachwitz, by Joel Selvin with Chris Strachwitz. According to Selvin, he was a longtime friend and disciple of Strachwitz, and that when Strachwitz suggested publishing a book from his huge collection of digitized photographs, Selvin enthusiastically jumped in to help. They worked on the book in the last 18 months of Strachwitz's life, and Selvin finished it shortly after Strachwitz's death.

== Death ==
Strachwitz died on May 5, 2023, at age 91.

== Awards and legacy ==
In 1993, Strachwitz received a lifetime achievement award from the Blues Symposium for his role in preserving the blues, and in 1999 was inducted as a non-performing member of the Blues Hall of Fame.

In 1995 he formed the Arhoolie Foundation "to document, preserve, present and disseminate authentic traditional and regional vernacular music." The Foundation owns the Chris Strachwitz Frontera Collection, comprising about 44,000 commercially issued phonograph records of Mexican-American and Mexican vernacular material, issued between around 1906 and the 1990s, which are now in the process of being digitized. In 2009, the collection was opened to the public at the Chicano Studies Research Center of the University of California, Los Angeles.

Strachwitz was a recipient of a 2000 National Heritage Fellowship from the National Endowment for the Arts, which is the United States' highest honor in the folk and traditional arts.

In February 2016, he was awarded the Grammy Trustees Award by The Recording Academy at the 2016 Grammys in recognition of his contributions in areas of recording other than performance.
