= Black Ace =

American Texas blues musician (1905–1972)

- Also known as: B.K. Turner; Black Ace Turner; Babe Turner; Buck Turner
- Born: Babe Kyro Lemon Turner; December 21, 1905; Hughes Springs, Texas, U.S.
- Died: November 7, 1972 (aged 66) Fort Worth, Texas, U.S.
- Genres: Texas blues; Country blues
- Instruments: Guitar, vocals
- Years active: Late 1920s – mid-1940s, 1960–1962
- Labels: Decca; Arhoolie

Babe Kyro Lemon Turner (December 21, 1905 – November 7, 1972) was an American Texas blues musician most frequently known by the stage name Black Ace. He was also known as B. K. Turner, Black Ace Turner, Babe Turner and Buck Turner.

== Biography ==
Turner was born in Hughes Springs, Texas, and was raised on his family's farm. He taught himself to play guitar and performed in east Texas from the late 1920s on. In the early 1930s he began playing with Smokey Hogg and Oscar "Buddy" Woods, a lap steel guitarist. Turner then bought a National resonator guitar and began playing what a later music critic called "Hawaii meets the Delta."

In 1937, Turner recorded six songs (possibly with Hogg as second guitarist) for Decca Records in Dallas, including the blues song "Black Ace". In the same year, he started a radio show on KFJZ in Fort Worth, using that recording as a theme song, and soon assumed the name.

In 1941, he appeared in The Blood of Jesus, an African-American movie produced by Spencer Williams Jr. In 1943 Turner was drafted into the U.S. Army and gave up playing music for some years. In 1960, Chris Strachwitz, the owner of Arhoolie Records, persuaded him to record an album for Arhoolie. His last public performance was in the 1962 film documentary The Blues. Turner died of cancer in Fort Worth in 1972.

== Discography ==
- The Black Ace: BK Turner and His Steel Guitar (studio album, Arhoolie, 1960)
- I'm the Boss Card in Your Hand (compilation, Arhoolie, 1992)
