= Arhoolie Records =

American independent record label

- Parent company: Smithsonian Institution
- Founded: 1960
- Founder: Chris Strachwitz
- Genre: Various
- Country of origin: United States
- Location: El Cerrito, California
- Official website: folkways.si.edu/arhoolie

Arhoolie Records is an American small independent record label that was run by Chris Strachwitz and is based in El Cerrito, California, United States. (It is actually located in Richmond Annex, but has an El Cerrito postal address.) The label was founded by Strachwitz in 1960 as a way for him to record and produce music by previously obscure "down-home blues" artists such as Lightnin' Hopkins, Snooks Eaglin, and Bill Gaither. Strachwitz despised most commercial music as "mouse music." Arhoolie still publishes blues and folk music, Tejano music including Lydia Mendoza, Los Alegres de Terán, Flaco Jiménez, regional Mexican music, cajun, zydeco, and bluegrass.

== History ==
Chris Strachwitz immigrated with his family from Silesia in 1947, and became enamored with American regional music after seeing the film New Orleans. He eventually settled in the San Francisco bay area, and in 1960 he headed to Texas to record bluesman Lightnin' Hopkins, but it turned out that Hopkins was in Berkeley for a performance engagement. He met up with historian Mack McCormick, and together they traveled to Navasota, Texas where Strachwitz recorded Mance Lipscomb for what would become the first Arhoolie LP, Texas Sharecropper and Songster. The name "Arhoolie" was suggested by McCormick, deriving from a word for a field holler. Strachwitz also recorded "Black Ace" Turner, "Li'l Son" Jackson and Whistlin' Alex Moore on the same trip, and later in the year recorded Big Joe Williams and Mercy Dee Walton in California.

He also began reissuing archive material, both of R&B singers such as Big Joe Turner (with Pete Johnson) and Lowell Fulson who had recorded for the defunct Swing Time label in the 1940s, and old country and western recordings on his Old Timey label, started in 1962. Strachwitz continued traveling to make field recordings of blues musicians, notably Mississippi Fred McDowell (whom he first recorded in 1964), Juke Boy Bonner, and K. C. Douglas. From 1965, he also hosted a Sunday afternoon music program on Pacifica Radio's KPFA-FM in Berkeley, California, which ran until 1995.

In 1966, his friend Ed Denson introduced him to a local band, Country Joe and the Fish, who were active in anti-Vietnam war protests at Berkeley. Strachwitz recorded the band singing "I Feel Like I'm Fixin' to Die", and gained a share of the song's publishing rights. Eventually, royalties from the song - particularly its appearance in the Woodstock Festival movie and soundtrack album - helped subsidize the Arhoolie label, and enabled Strachwitz to buy a building in San Pablo Avenue, El Cerrito, California as the label's headquarters. Strachwitz also won royalties for Fred McDowell from the Rolling Stones' performance of his song "You Gotta Move" on their Sticky Fingers album.

During the 1970s, Strachwitz continued to record blues musicians, including Big Joe Duskin, Charlie Musselwhite, Big Mama Thornton, Elizabeth Cotten, and Robben Ford, as well as Cajun and zydeco performers such as Clifton Chenier, Lawrence Ardoin and John Delafose. He also continued to secure the rights to release archive blues material such as that by Snooks Eaglin and Robert Pete Williams. In the 1980s and 1990s, he continued to develop Arhoolie as a distributor of smaller independent blues labels, and an importer of jazz and blues releases on European labels.

Strachwitz increasingly focused attention on Mexican and, specifically, norteño music, which he had long admired, amassing what is believed to be the largest private collection of Mexican-American and Mexican music. He donated this collection, known as the Strachwitz Frontera Collection of Mexican and Mexican-American Music, to the nonprofit organization Arhoolie Foundation. The first norteño album on Arhoolie was Conjuntos Norteños, by Los Pinguinos del Norte, released in 1970, but one of his biggest successes came with Flaco Jiménez, whose album Ay Te Dejo en San Antonio won a Grammy Award in 1986. With cinematographer Les Blank, he also made two documentaries about the music in the mid 1970s, Chulas Fronteras and Del Mero Corazon. He discovered and released the first two albums of seminal klezmer revival band The Klezmorim. Another of Strachwitz's discoveries, and one of his biggest commercial successes, was Cajun musician Michael Doucet and his group BeauSoleil.

Artists who have recorded for the Arhoolie label include Black Ace, Juke Boy Bonner, Big Mama Thornton, Big Walter Horton, Lightnin' Hopkins, George 'Bongo Joe' Coleman, Snooks Eaglin, Dave Alexander, Nathan Beauregard, Clifton Chenier, Elizabeth Cotten, Sue Draheim, Jesse Fuller, Earl Hooker, John Jackson, Mance Lipscomb, Guitar Slim, Robert Shaw, Mississippi Fred McDowell, Whistlin' Alex Moore, Charlie Musselwhite, Doctor Ross, Bukka White, Big Joe Williams, Silas Hogan, Mercy Dee Walton, The Campbell Brothers, BeauSoleil, Jerry Hahn, the Pine Leaf Boys, Los Cenzontles, The Klezmorim, Rose Maddox, Rebirth Brass Band, and HowellDevine.

In 2014, filmmakers Maureen Gosling and Chris Simon released a documentary film about Arhoolie Records entitled This Ain't No Mouse Music, which is distributed by Argot Pictures.

In May 2016, the Smithsonian Institution announced it had acquired Arhoolie Records from founder Chris Strachwitz and his business partner Tom Diamant for the Smithsonian Folkways Recordings.

In late 2023, the Arhoolie Foundation published the book Down Home Music: The Stories and Photographs of Chris Strachwitz, by Joel Selvin with Chris Strachwitz. According to Selvin, he was a longtime friend and disciple of Strachwitz, and when Strachwitz suggested publishing a book from his huge collection of digitized photographs, Selvin enthusiastically offered to help. They worked on the book in the last 18 months of Strachwitz's life, and Selvin finished it shortly after Strachwitz's death.

== See also ==
- List of record labels
