= World Gone Wrong =

Studio album by Bob Dylan
- Released: October 26, 1993
- Recorded: May 1993
- Studio: Bob Dylan's Malibu Garage
- Genres: Folk; blues
- Length: 43:51
- Label: Columbia
- Producer: Bob Dylan

Bob Dylan chronology
The 30th Anniversary Concert Celebration (1993)	World Gone Wrong (1993)	Bob Dylan's Greatest Hits Volume 3 (1994)

Bob Dylan studio album chronology
Good as I Been to You (1992)	World Gone Wrong (1993)	Time Out of Mind (1997)

World Gone Wrong is the twenty-ninth studio album by American singer-songwriter Bob Dylan, released on October 26, 1993, by Columbia Records.

It was Dylan's second consecutive collection of only traditional folk songs, performed acoustically with guitar and harmonica. The songs tend to deal with darker and more tragic themes than the previous outing, Good as I Been to You.

The album received generally positive reviews from critics and won a Grammy award for Best Traditional Folk Album. It peaked at number 70 in the U.S., and at number 35 in the UK.

== Recording sessions ==
Similar to how he had recorded his previous album, Good as I Been to You, Dylan held sessions at his Malibu home garage studio and recorded World Gone Wrong solo in a matter of days. He was assisted by sound engineer Micajah Ryan but served as his own producer. In their book Bob Dylan All the Songs: The Story Behind Every Track, authors Philippe Margotin and Jean-Michel Guesdon describe "a clear difference in the sound quality of this new record: Good As I Been to You has a 'full' sound, with Dylan's guitar recorded in stereo; World Gone Wrong sounds more raw. Listeners can hear breathing and distortion".

The balance of songs in World Gone Wrong swung more towards rural blues. Two had been recorded by the Mississippi Sheiks, two more by Blind Willie McTell, one by Willie Brown, and another by Frank Hutchison. Songs popularized by Tom Paley and Doc Watson were also recorded. In the case of "The Two Soldiers", Dylan learned it from Jerry Garcia and had been performing it live since 1988.

Possibly influenced by the controversy surrounding the lack of credits on Good as I Been to You, Dylan wrote a complete set of liner notes to World Gone Wrong, citing all possible sources. It had been decades since Dylan had written his own liner notes, and they were always surrealistic; these notes, while still playfully written, were actually informative.

== Outtakes ==
Two outtakes from these sessions, Robert Johnson's "32-20 Blues" and the traditional "Mary and the Soldier", were released on The Bootleg Series Vol. 8: Tell Tale Signs in 2008. An outtake of “I’ve Always Been a Rambler” has been made available to listen to at the Bob Dylan Center in Tulsa, Oklahoma. There are rumors of at least three additional outtakes that do not circulate among collectors: "Goodnight My Love", "Twenty-One Years", and the Carter Family's "Hello Stranger".

== Album artwork ==
The album cover is a photograph by Ana Maria Velez of Dylan wearing a top hat and seated at a table at Flukes Cradle Cafe bar in Camden Town, London. Hanging on the wall behind Dylan is a painting, L'Etranger by artist Peter Gallagher. The back cover is a photograph of Dylan shot by photographer Randee St. Nicholas. The album's design is credited to Nancy Donald.

== Promotion ==
Bob Dylan in the "Blood in My Eyes" music video

Dylan released a promotional music video for "Blood in My Eyes", directed by the Eurythmics' Dave Stewart, to coincide with the release of World Gone Wrong. The video, shot on Camden High Street in North London on July 21, 1993, intercuts footage of a top-hatted Dylan lip-synching the song in a cafe with footage of Dylan wandering around the streets of London outside. Filmed in 16mm black-and-white, it has been called "beautiful" and one of Dylan's best music videos by Dylan scholar Aaron Galbraith. The video appears on the bonus DVD included in the Limited Edition version of Dylan's 2006 album Modern Times. The color photograph of Dylan that adorns the cover of World Gone Wrong was taken on the same day that the video was shot.

== Reception and legacy ==
Professional ratings
Review scores
Source	Rating
AllMusic	3.5/5 stars
Calgary Herald	B−
Christgau's Consumer Guide	A−
The Encyclopedia of Popular Music	2/5 stars
Tom Hull	A−
MusicHound Rock: The Essential Album Guide	2/5 stars
The Rolling Stone Album Guide	4/5 stars
Select	2/5 medals

World Gone Wrong placed 23rd on The Village Voice's Pazz & Jop Critics Poll for 1993.

Robert Christgau gave it an A− in his Consumer Guide column published in The Village Voice. "Dylan's second attempt to revive the folk music revival while laying down a new record without writing any new songs is eerie and enticing", wrote Christgau.

AllMusic's Stephen Thomas Erlewine called it "an exceptional set of songs given performances so fully realized that they seemed like modern protest songs" and noted that "Dylan seems more connected to the music than he has in years. That sense of connection, plus the terrific choice of songs, makes this one of his best, strongest albums of the second half of his career".

David Bowie was a fan of both Good as I Been to You and World Gone Wrong, stating in a 1997 interview that "[Dylan's] albums have a great class to them, even those albums where he is actually playing songs of long-dead blues singers".

Spectrum Culture included two songs from the album, "Blood in My Eyes" and "Delia", on a list of "Bob Dylan's 20 Best Songs of the '90s". A 2015 USA Today article ranking "every Bob Dylan song" placed "Jack-A-Roe" 53rd (out of 359), the highest rated song from either Good as I Been to You or World Gone Wrong to make the list.

Hip hop group Public Enemy referenced the album's title in their 2007 Dylan tribute song "Long and Whining Road": "In this world gone wrong, here's another love song".

NJArts' Jay Lustig wrote that World Gone Wrong is "a little stronger, overall" than Good as I Been to You and cited "Blood in My Eyes" as the highlight of the album.

Stereogum ran an article to coincide with Dylan's 80th birthday on May 24, 2021, in which 80 musicians were asked to name their favorite Dylan song. Strand of Oaks' Tim Showalter selected "Lone Pilgrim", noting "I must have checked out World Gone Wrong [from the Goshen Public Library] a hundred times. 'Lone Pilgrim' was the last track on the album and I believe it was the first full song I ever learned on guitar. I still use the structure to this day. It was such a weird and organic way to open the door to musical discovery but I am so thankful for that".

== Track listing ==
All songs are traditional, arranged by Bob Dylan, except where noted.

Side one
No.	Title	Writer(s)	Length
1.	"World Gone Wrong"		3:57
2.	"Love Henry"		4:24
3.	"Ragged & Dirty"	Willie Brown	4:09
4.	"Blood in My Eyes"		5:04
5.	"Broke Down Engine"	Blind Willie McTell	3:22
Total length:			20:56

Side two
No.	Title	Writer(s)	Length
1.	"Delia"		5:41
2.	"Stack a Lee"	arranged by Frank Hutchison	3:50
3.	"Two Soldiers"		5:45
4.	"Jack-A-Roe"		4:56
5.	"Lone Pilgrim"	Benjamin Franklin White, Adger M. Pace	2:43
Total length:			22:55

== Personnel ==
- Bob Dylan – vocals, guitar, harmonica, production, liner notes
