= H. C. Speir =

Henry Columbus Speir (October 6, 1895 – April 22, 1972) was an American "talent broker" and record store owner from Jackson, Mississippi. He was responsible for launching the recording careers of most of the greatest Mississippi blues musicians in the 1920s and 1930s. According to blues researcher Gayle Dean Wardlow, "Speir was the godfather of Delta Blues" and was "a musical visionary [without whom] Mississippi's greatest natural resource might have gone untapped." A historical marker commemorates his life and work.

== Career ==
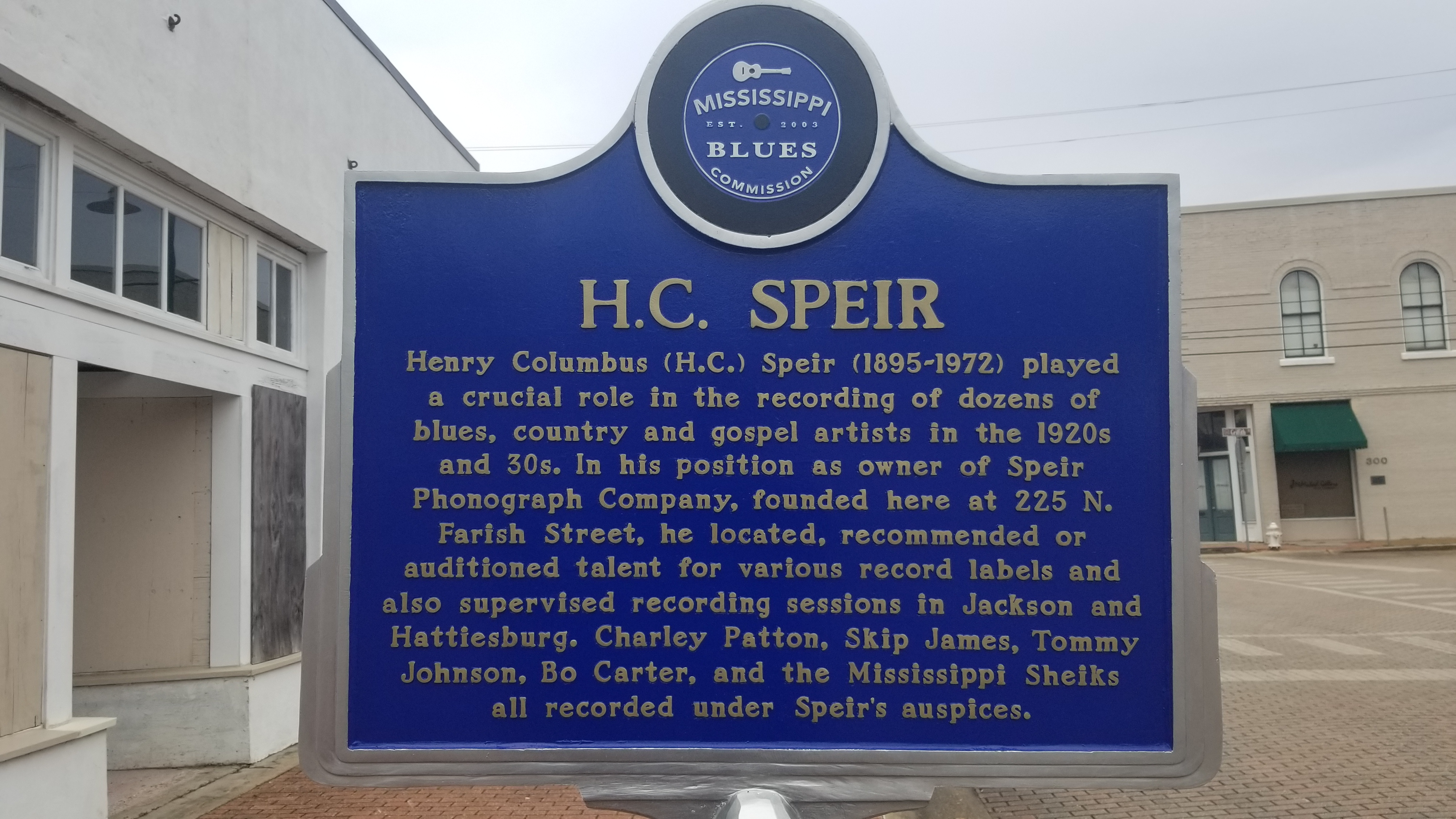

Born in Prospect, Mississippi, Speir was a white businessman who owned and ran a music and mercantile store, the Speir Phonograph Company, on Farish Street, in Jackson's black neighborhood. In 1926, through selling blues records in his store, he began working as a scout for the record companies producing the records, such as Okeh, Victor, Gennett, Columbia, Vocalion, Decca and Paramount.

Using a metal disc machine in his store, Speir made demo recordings of the musicians that he sent to the labels, before arranging for more formal recording sessions. Word spread among blues musicians that Speir could help them make records, and many came to audition at the store. This audition process — along with the ensuing recording sessions — was dramatized in the Wim Wenders-directed installment of the television mini-series Martin Scorsese Presents the Blues: A Musical Journey, entitled "The Soul of a Man", which aired on PBS in 2003.

Among the numerous musicians whom Speir introduced to the record companies were William Harris, Ishman Bracey, Tommy Johnson, Charlie Patton, Son House, Skip James, Robert Johnson, Bo Carter, Willie Brown, the Mississippi Sheiks, Blind Joe Reynolds, Blind Roosevelt Graves, Geeshie Wiley, and Robert Wilkins. He also auditioned, but turned down, Jimmie Rodgers.

Speir retired from recording in 1936, and left Farish Street after a 1942 fire at his store. In the 1960s, Speir was extensively interviewed by Gayle Dean Wardlow about the recordings he had made. On April 22, 1972, Speir died at his home in Pearl, Mississippi, after a heart attack. He is buried alongside his wife at Lakewood Memorial Park Cemetery, in Clinton, Mississippi.

Speir was posthumously inducted into the Blues Hall of Fame in 2005.
