= The Search for Robert Johnson =

- Directed by: Chris Hunt
- Starring: Johnny Shines; David Honeyboy Edwards
- Narrated by: John P. Hammond
- Music by: Robert Johnson
- Country of origin: United Kingdom

Production
- Producer: Chris Hunt
- Cinematography: Paul Bond, Ken Morse
- Editor: Stuart Davidson
- Running time: 53 minutes (TV). 72 minutes (VHS, DVD)
- Production company: Iambic Productions

Original release
- Network: Channel 4
- Release: 1992

The Search for Robert Johnson is a 1992 British television documentary film about the American Delta blues musician Robert Johnson, hosted by John Hammond, and produced and directed by Chris Hunt. In the film, Hammond journeys through the American Deep South to pursue topics such as Johnson's birth date, place and parents, his early musical development, performances and travels, romances, his mythic "pact with the devil," his death in the late 1930s, the discovery of possible offspring, and the uncertainty over where Johnson is buried. Throughout, Johnson's music is both foreground and background, from recordings of Johnson and as performed on camera by Hammond, David "Honeyboy" Edwards, and Johnny Shines.

Produced by Iambic Productions, the documentary first aired on Channel 4.

== Documentary ==
Blues musician and "keeper of the flame" John Hammond described his journey into the American South as "the quest of a lifetime". His father, record producer and jazz impresario John H. Hammond, had planned and advertised for Robert Johnson to perform at Carnegie Hall, but Johnson died prior to the concert.

The film is loosely organised around field work by Johnson researcher Robert "Mack" McCormick. Throughout the film, Hammond travels to locations where Johnson lived, performed, recorded, and purportedly where he died, and interviews two of Johnson's girlfriends and blues musicians who knew him, as well as two noted blues researchers. Locations include the "Delta, the floodplain of northwestern Mississippi, on into Arkansas and Texas, and into southern Mississippi, where he was born and died."

The film has been noted for its presentation of new evidence, at the time, about Johnson's life.

- Hammond describes Johnny Shines arriving in Helena, Arkansas, hearing there was a guitar player who thought highly of himself, and going to meet him. Shines re-enacts, with Hammond standing in for Johnson, the performance battle he had with Johnson on opposing street corners in Helena, where the two played and sang to pull away the other man's crowd of listeners. In the re-enactment scene, Shines gradually draws onlookers away from Hammond, "cutting heads," as described by Barbara Schroeder.
- Interviewing Willie Mae Powell, once Johnson's girlfriend, Hammond plays for her Johnson's recording of "Love in Vain" which she had not heard before. When Johnson calls out Willie Mae's name in the song, she is visibly surprised.
- In the first documented interview with Claude Johnson, son Gregory and grandson Richard, Claude's birth certificate is shown, as he describes that "Robert Lee Johnson" is his father. Claude was legally declared to be Robert Johnson's son in 1998.
- David Honeyboy Edwards, riding with Hammond through Greenwood, Mississippi, points out a yellow shotgun house where he says Johnson died. This location was mapped in the National Park Service photographic documentary project "Trail of the Hellhound".
- The film presents the first record of direct testimony by Johnson researcher Robert "Mack" McCormick. McCormick had not published previous research under his own name.
- In the film, McCormick discloses that Johnson's association with "satanic legends" started not merely as myth concocted by others, but had its roots in the death of Johnson's first wife during childbirth while he was away. Her family blamed Johnson, mainly for being an itinerant musician singing "the devil's music". McCormick asserts that Johnson was condemned so severely for her death that he gradually "became that person", associating himself with the devil in his music.
- Robert Johnson's death certificate is shown in the documentary, "answering some questions, but prompting even more." It had been located by blues researcher Gayle Dean Wardlow in 1968, and independently by McCormick, who also tracked down witnesses to events surrounding Johnson's poisoning and death.

=== Interviewees ===
Guitarists Keith Richards and Eric Clapton, blues researchers Gayle Dean Wardlow and Robert "Mack" McCormick, childhood acquaintance Wink Clark, Nat Richardson, a "juke house" owner's son, Delta blues musicians David Honeyboy Edwards and Johnny Shines, girlfriends Willie Mae Powell and 'Queen' Elizabeth, discovered son Claud Johnson, his son Gregory and grandson Richard, Greenwood Councillor David Jordan, and cemetery attendant Miller Carter were all interviewed for the film.

== Reception ==
The film received positive reviews, especially from musicians and music critics. Upon its broadcast in 1992, UK producer and blues critic Neil Slaven, quoted later by Schroeder, wrote that the film "encompasses a detective story overlaid with folk memory, its interviews succinctly to the point, containing humor, superstition, and contextural information in equal parts." Folk singer Dave Van Ronk, reviewing the released video for Entertainment Weekly, wrote of its "lucid narration," and gave the film an "A," satisfied that it stayed focused on the music. Chicago Tribune reviewer Bill Dahl's four-star review termed the film "fascinating" and summarised, "Questions remain about this blues legend who claimed he sold his soul to achieve musical immortality, but this exceptional video answers a great many of them." Prior to its showing on American network Bravo, a 1994 New York Times review described the film as "outstanding" and "a riveting combination of biography and American history."

Upon the Sony DVD's release in 2000, Ian Morris of MichaelDVD.com rated the film itself at 4.5/5 stars, calling it "like manna from heaven for a music aficionado like myself," and "an almost essential purchase about one of the true legends of music," while faulting the DVD's video quality and lack of closed captions, for an aggregate score of 4/5 stars.

In 2004, author Patricia R. Schroeder analysed the film in depth in Robert Johnson, Mythmaking, and Contemporary American Culture, writing that the film is "a well researched attempt to recover what is knowable about the historical Robert Johnson. It was well received by critics, as Emmy-winner Chris Hunt's documentaries on musical figures usually are." But Schroeder found that the film's documentary goals of objectivity and authenticity were partly undercut, first by the lavish praise heaped upon Johnson early in the film and Hammond's self-acknowledged "quest", and second because Hammond was featured prominently in the film playing long passages of several Johnson songs, and seeming to stand in for Johnson in sessions and in the re-enactment of headcutting.

== Releases ==
TV: UK Channel 4, 1992.
VHS: Sony Music Video 49113. 1992. 72 minutes.
DVD: Sony Music. 72 minutes. 31 October 2000 ASIN: B000050IKX UPC: 007464491139
DVD: Digital Classics. 8 May 2006. ASIN: B000EU1LOA
