= Tom Graves (writer) =

American journalist

- Born: Thomas Alan Graves; July 7, 1954 (age 72); Memphis, Tennessee, U.S.
- Education: University of Memphis (B.A., M.F.A.)
- Occupations: Author, educator
- Children: 1
- Writing career
- Genres: Fiction, Non-fiction
- Notable awards: Keeping the Blues Alive Award in Literature, Emmy Award
- Website: authortomgraves.com

Thomas Alan Graves (born July 7, 1954) is an American journalist, nonfiction writer, and novelist. He is best known as the author of Crossroads, a biography of blues musician Robert Johnson. He is also known for his work as a producer and writer for the film Best of Enemies. He co-owns the independent publishing company, The Devault-Graves Agency, and is a tenured Assistant Professor of English at LeMoyne–Owen College in Memphis.

== Education and early career ==
In 1976, Graves graduated with a B.A. degree in Journalism from the University of Memphis. After graduation, he worked as an advertising and public relations writer while also writing as a freelancer for small literary magazines such as Fiction Texas, The Chouteau Review, Southern Exposure, and The New Leader.

In 1979, Graves interviewed novelist Harry Crews for The Paris Review. The Paris Review did not publish the interview, and instead, it became the book Getting Naked With Harry Crews (1999). Graves interviewed several other notable figures during his career, including Louise Brooks and Frank Zappa.

He has published articles in several publications, including Rolling Stone, Goldmine, The New York Times, and The Washington Post, among others.

In 1987, he founded and published Rock & Roll Disc, a magazine that had a small circulation. Rock & Roll Disc reviewed and rated newly released compact discs. Among many veteran music writers for the magazine were Dave Marsh, Ed Ward, Rich Kienzle, and Stanley Booth. The magazine ceased publication in 1992.

== Graduate degree and further career ==
Graves started out working as a part of several public relations and communications firms. He decided to return to the University of Memphis to earn an M.F.A. in Creative Writing, which would allow him to teach at the college level. He entered the M.F.A. program in 1995 as the first student to specialize in Creative Nonfiction. In 1998 he published his first book, the novel Pullers. The novel was published by Hastings House of Connecticut. Although sales were relatively modest, Pullers received good reviews and blurbs from Charles Gaines. It remains a cult favorite for fans of tough Southern grit lit.

Following his graduation in 1998 from the University of Memphis with the first M.F.A. degree in Creative Nonfiction in the Creative Writing program, Graves began to teach as an adjunct professor at the University of Memphis and at Mid-South Community College in West Memphis, Arkansas. He accepted an instructorship at a historically black college in Memphis, LeMoyne-Owen College, in 2007, where he teaches English, Humanities, and Journalism. He received tenure at the college in 2016 and retired from teaching in 2020.

In 2007 Graves published a biography of bluesman Robert Johnson, Crossroads: The Life and Afterlife of Blues Legend Robert Johnson with DeMers Books of Spokane, Washington. Graves debunked many of the myths surrounding Johnson, including the tale that Johnson was poisoned with strychnine by a jealous husband. He also corrected the legend of the crossroads and reiterated that the crossroads myth was intended for bluesman Tommy Johnson and not Robert Johnson. The book won the Blues Foundation's Keeping the Blues Alive Award (formerly known as the Handy Awards) in Literature for 2010.

== Best of Enemies film and Emmy award ==
In 2010, Graves acquired a video set of the 12 acrimonious debates between Gore Vidal and William F. Buckley Jr. that aired on television in 1968 as a part of the ABC Network's presidential convention coverage. Over several decades, Graves attempted to acquire the videos from ABC, which consistently turned him down. Graves learned that an associate of Vidal's had acquired a set of the tapes from ABC, but they were to be exclusively for Vidal's usage. Graves convinced Vidal's associate of his good intentions and was allowed to duplicate the tapes. He approached the Memphis Brooks Museum of Art about a special screening of the videos, and was accepted. Hoping for at least 100 interested attendees, the show sold out and there was standing room only. Bloggers quickly reported the news that the debates still existed and that the screening had received an eager audience.

Graves' long-time friend, fellow Memphian and writer/filmmaker Robert Gordon, contacted him about viewing the Buckley-Vidal videos. Gordon asked Graves if the debates might make a good documentary, Graves responded enthusiastically and teamed with Gordon to make the film. Gordon also enlisted his frequent filmmaking partner, Morgan Neville, and the three began interviewing subjects for the project. The film, which later was titled Best of Enemies, took five years to complete and premiered at The Sundance Film Festival in 2015 to laudatory reviews. It was purchased by Magnolia Films and had a successful theatrical run. The film was shown on the PBS show Independent Lens in 2016 and won a News and Documentary Emmy Award in the category Outstanding Historical Documentary in 2017. Graves was credited as Consulting Producer for the film, but, along with Robert Gordon and Morgan Neville, was a writer for the film, but uncredited as a writer.

== The Devault-Graves Agency and J.D. Salinger book of short stories ==
In 2012 Graves and his friend Darrin Devault, at the time a professor of Journalism at the University of Memphis, formed a partnership as an independent publishing company, The Devault-Graves Agency. They wanted to explore the emerging market for ebooks but soon became equally interested in publishing print books and audiobooks. In 2013 they debuted an annotated edition of one of Jack Kerouac's most prominent novels, Big Sur, and followed with two more Kerouac novels Maggie Cassidy and Tristessa. A year later The Devault-Graves Agency made world literary news by publishing the first legitimate J.D. Salinger book in over 50 years, Three Early Stories. The book collected the first two short stories ever published by Salinger and a later one published during his World War II period. The agency discovered through research that those three Salinger stories, unbeknownst to the Salinger estate according to some reports, had fallen into the public domain. However, The Devault-Graves Agency applied for and received a copyright for the book as a unique anthology, thus protecting its Three Early Stories book from others publishing the three stories collectively.

Three Early Stories was also published in six foreign-language editions. The Devault-Graves Agency brought suit against the Salinger Trust for what they termed as interference with their foreign marketing of the book. The agency dropped the lawsuit when they felt that the Salinger Trust would no longer interfere with the book's marketing in those countries where the copyright of Three Early Stories was upheld. The agency also claimed they would not try to market the book in countries where the Salinger Trust still held copyright to the three stories in question. The copyright issues involved in the case have caused it to become an important case in the area of international copyright law.

== Further works ==
In 2015, Graves published an anthology of his best articles and interviews, Louise Brooks, Frank Zappa, & Other Charmers & Dreamers. Also in 2015, Graves, with Darrin Devault, published a photography book, Graceland Too Revisited documenting the ill-fated roadside attraction Graceland Too in Holly Springs, Mississippi.

In another project, Graves adapted 25 of the best-known Aesop's Fables, updating them for contemporary audiences, and recruited Colin Hay, the former frontman for the Australian rock group Men At Work, to narrate the tales. Hay agreed to voice the audiobook and worked with Graves in a recording studio in Memphis. The result was Aesop's Fables with Colin Hay, published in audiobook and ebook formats, in 2017.

In 2016 Graves began to take cooking lessons from a veteran African-American soul food cook, Larthy Washington. He turned the experience into a book, Cooking With Ms. Larthy, which he is currently completing.

Tom Graves' autobiography White Boy: A Memoir was published on June 1, 2019.
