= Head cutting =

Head cutting may refer to:

- Guitar battle
- Head cut (stream geomorphology), an erosional feature in some intermittent and perennial streams with an abrupt vertical drop
