= Grady, Alabama =

- Unincorporated community
- Location within Alabama Location within the United States
- Coordinates: 31°59′42″N 86°12′4″W
- Country: United States
- State: Alabama
- County: Montgomery
- Time zone: UTC-6 (Central (CST))
  - Summer (DST): UTC-5 (CDT)
- ZIP code: 36036
- Area code: 334
- GNIS feature ID: 119205

Grady is an unincorporated community in Montgomery County, Alabama, United States. Grady is located about 25 miles (40 km) south of Montgomery. It is at the intersection of Montgomery County Road 28 (Meriwether Trail) and Montgomery County Road 1 (Ramer-Grady Road).

Grady is named in honor of Henry W. Grady.

A US Postal Office is in Grady. Its ZIP code is 36036. A post office first began operating under the name Grady in 1890.

== Notable people ==
- Tracy Harris Patterson, former two weight world champion boxer
- Ike Zimmerman, blues guitarist, who is now known to have been musician Robert Johnson's main guitar teacher
