= Bruce Conforth =

American academic and musician

- Born: Bruce Michael Conforth; September 3, 1950 (age 75); Paterson, New Jersey, U.S.
- Occupations: Academic, author, lecturer, musician

Bruce Michael Conforth (born September 3, 1950) is an American academic, author, lecturer, and musician. He was the first curator of Cleveland's Rock and Roll Hall of Fame.

== Early years ==
Conforth was born in Paterson, New Jersey, and grew up in New Jersey and New York City. He became an artist and musician at an early age. In 1966, he appeared on an album called It's Happening Here as the bass player for a band called The Nightwatch. He was an athlete in high school, winning several letters and medals for his abilities as a long jumper, quarter-miler, and a member of the mile-relay team.

== The 1960s and 1970s ==
Conforth joined the early 1960s folk scene in New York City's Greenwich Village. He said that he used to hang out at Izzy Young’s Folklore Center, where he met Bob Dylan, Dave Van Ronk, Harry Belafonte, and others. At the Gaslight Cafe, he saw and was influenced by such blues musicians as Son House, Skip James, and Mississippi John Hurt, and he also took guitar lessons from Rev. Gary Davis.

After graduating from high school, Conforth received a scholarship to art school, and in 1971, worked as an apprentice to the American abstract expressionist Willem de Kooning. In 1973, he was the editor of a college literary magazine, through which he made contact with poets Allen Ginsberg and Charles Bukowski, and with John Lennon and Yoko Ono.

In 1977, he appeared as "Josh Hawkins" (part of the duet Bates and Hawkins) on an album called Ragtime, Blues and Jive, also featuring fiddler Kenny Kosek.

== The 1980s ==
In 1980, Conforth began attending graduate school at Indiana University Bloomington, where he majored in folklore, ethnomusicology, and American Studies. He married the former Jeanne Harrah and they combined their last names; for the next decade, he was known as Bruce Harrah-Conforth. He continued to play music, appearing in a local band called The Extremes. While at Indiana University, he worked at the university's Archives of Traditional Music, contributing a number of articles to their newsletter "Resound". Through his work at the Archives, he became involved with the still relatively unknown collection of African-American folk recordings of Lawrence Gellert. He produced two albums of songs from this collection. The first, in 1982, was on Rounder Records,"Cap'n You're So mean" (RR#4013) was recognized by the Library of Congress as one of that year's most outstanding folk recordings. The second, "Nobody Knows My Name" was issued by the English company Heritage Records (HT304) in 1984. Conforth wrote his 1984 Master's thesis on the collection: "Laughing Just to Keep from Crying: Afro-American Folksong and the Field Recordings of Lawrence Gellert".

In 1985, Conforth completed his PhD, which was titled "The Rise and Fall of a Modern Folk Community: Haight-Ashbury 1965-1967." It contains many interviews with the founding musicians of the "San Francisco Sound."

During the 1980s, Harrah-Conforth became involved in researching the use of light and sound stimulation in inducing altered states of consciousness in humans. He produced a work titled "Accessing Alternity" that described the history of man's quest into this area. In "A History of Light and Sound", Michael Hutchison wrote:

The report by Harrah-Conforth suggests that sound and light devices may cause simultaneous ergotropic arousal, or arousal of the sympathetic nervous system and the cerebral cortex, associated with 'creative' and 'ecstatic experiences,' and trophotropic arousal, or the arousal of the parasympathetic system, associated with deep relaxation and 'the timeless, "oceanic" mode of the mystic experience.' In humans, Dr. Harrah-Conforth concludes, 'these two states may be interpreted as hyper- and hypo- arousal, or ecstasy and samadhi.

== The 1990s ==
In May 1991, he was named the founding curator of the Rock and Roll Hall of Fame and Museum in Cleveland. His initial duties were to create the collections for the Museum. The early years of the Rock Hall saw some tensions develop friction between the two boards of directors: one in Cleveland made of local businessmen, and one in New York City (the location of the Rock and Roll Hall of Fame Foundation) populated by industry executives such as Ahmet Ertegun of Atlantic Records and Jann Wenner of Rolling Stone Magazine. With the construction of the building almost complete, Conforth left the job. He was alleged to have written a tell-all book called "Don't Rock the Hall" but the work has never been published.

After leaving the Museum in 1994, Conforth was appointed one of six "founding faculty" designated to create the programs for a "New College of Global Studies" being created by Radford University in Radford, Virginia. While there, he worked with noted neuro-psychologist Dr. Karl Pribram at his Center for Brain Research.

In 1995, Conforth took his first trip to Nepal and immediately developed a deep interest in the region and in the religion of Tibetan Buddhism. For the following five years, he worked as a trekking guide in that area. The New College eventually closed when Virginia Governor George Allen stripped its budget.

== The 2000s - 2010s ==
In 2000, Conforth was appointed Director of the Jewel Heart Center for Tibetan Buddhism and Culture in Ann Arbor, Michigan, founded by the Buddhist teacher, Gelek Rinpoche. He also began teaching part-time at the University of Michigan. He left Jewel Heart in 2004 and became a full-time member of the university's Program in American Culture.

As part of the American Culture Department, Conforth developed and taught courses on American popular music, including blues and folk music, and folklore. On March 14, 2012, Conforth received the University of Michigan's Golden Apple Award for outstanding teaching.

=== Recent publications and research ===
In May 2013, Conforth's book African American Folksong and American Cultural Politics: The Lawrence Gellert Story, was published by Scarecrow Press, an imprint of Rowman and Littlefield publishers. Conforth taught folklore, blues music, popular culture, and the history of social movements at the University of Michigan, Ann Arbor until 2017.

His current work includes researching the life of bluesman Robert Johnson; a 2008 publication concerned Isaiah "Ike" Zimmerman, Johnson's main guitar mentor. In 2013, he published the article "The Death of Robert Johnson's Wife" discussing Johnson's wife Virginia Travis and her untimely death during childbirth. He once again published an article on Robert Johnson titled "The Business of Robert Johnson Fakery". The article discussed the identity theft and unscrupulous business of falsely authenticating material (photos, guitars, etc.) supposedly associated with Johnson.

In June 2019, Conforth co-authored, with blues scholar and author Gayle Dean Wardlow, a biography of Johnson, Up Jumped the Devil: The Real Life of Robert Johnson, published by Chicago Review Press. The book won the 2020 Penderyn Prize for being the best music book of any type for 2019, and also won both of the 27th Annual Living Blues book awards: the Critics Poll Award as the Best Blues Book of the Year and the Reader's Choice Poll as the Best Blues Book of 2019.

=== Sexual assault allegations ===
In April 2021, Conforth was accused of sexually assaulting, harassing, and stalking several students during his tenure at the University of Michigan. This followed Conforth's recommended retirement in 2016, after over 10 years of such reports.

Eight students filed a lawsuit in 2022 against the university and against Conforth. The lawsuits against the university were dismissed later the same year because the plaintiffs had not filed a timely notice of intent to sue. The lawsuits against Conforth were dismissed in 2024 for the same reason.
