= Ike Zimmerman =

American blues guitarist (1907–1967)

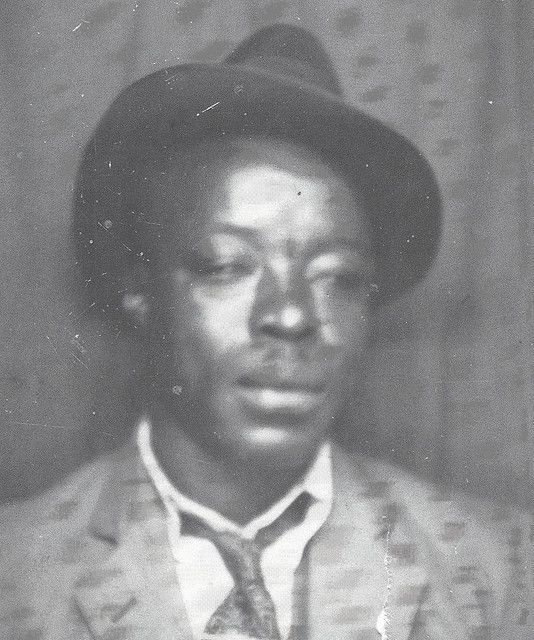

Background information
- Born: Isaiah Zimmerman; April 27, 1907; Grady, Alabama, U.S.
- Died: August 3, 1967 (aged 60) Compton, California, U.S.
- Genres: Blues, Delta Blues
- Occupation: Guitarist
- Years active: 1920s to 1950s
- Known for: Mentor of Robert Johnson

Isaiah "Ike" Zimmerman (April 27, 1907 – August 3, 1967) was an American blues guitarist, who is now known to have been musician Robert Johnson's main guitar teacher.

Zimmerman (Note: The spelling reportedly given in census records for the family going back to the early 1800s, on his Social Security card and Social Security death notice, on his funeral program, and by his daughters) (sometimes spelled Zinnerman) was born in Grady, Alabama. He married Ruth Sellers in the late 1920s, and lived with her and their children near Beauregard, Mississippi. He played guitar and harmonica in local juke joints, often practicing at night in local cemeteries where he would not disturb others. He became known for his guitar skills, and gave guitar lessons. Robert Johnson, who had been born in nearby Hazlehurst, came back to the area, probably around 1931, and was hoping to find his father, Noah Johnson. Johnson stopped to visit a local juke joint, where he saw Zimmerman perform.

== Background ==
According to one of Zimmerman's daughters, interviewed by blues researcher Bruce Conforth:

He [Robert].. he fitted in our family, and he had to be nice, because my daddy was a strong man and ...a good man, my daddy was, and so he wouldn’t have taken up no time with someone who wasn’t a good person. That’s the reason that I believe that he [Ike] took [Robert] under his arm. And so he was just like a family member.... He came there and lived in our house. But.. he met my daddy in Its [Itta Bena]. That’s where they first met… Up in Its. The juke joints and stuff.... Robert Johnson asked my daddy to teach him how to play guitar…and my daddy taught him. He lived there with my daddy. .. he stayed a long time (because) he was staying to learn how to play the guitar… It seemed like to me he just took him for his family ‘cause… for a long time I thought he was related... And they was going at that guitar like some… I told my son "I can remember hearing that music". 'Cause it sounded just so good just like they was competing, he was teaching him then.

Living with Zimmerman's family for about a year, Johnson became known by his initials, "R.L.". After practising together while sitting on tombstones in Beauregard Cemetery – thought to be a contributory factor to the legend of Johnson "selling his soul to the Devil" in order to play well – the pair toured local lumber camps and juke joints before Johnson began performing on his own. When he returned to his home in Clarksdale, Johnson impressed locals with how much his performing skills had improved during his time away, and, in 1936 and 1937, recorded the songs that eventually secured his status as one of the most important and influential blues performers. Members of Zimmerman's family have claimed that some of Johnson's songs, including "Ramblin' on My Mind", were in fact written by Zimmerman before Johnson stayed with the household, and others including "Dust My Broom" and "Come On In My Kitchen" were written by Johnson and Zimmerman together.

Zimmerman himself never made any recordings, though he performed widely in Mississippi. He gave up playing blues music, probably in the 1950s, and became a Pentecostal minister. He moved to California around 1960, and died in Compton, Los Angeles, from a heart attack in 1967, aged 60. In 2016 the Killer Blues Headstone Project placed a headstone for Ike Zimmerman at Lincoln Memorial Cemetery in Carson, California.
