= Guitar battle =

Guitar play-off competition

A guitar battle (or guitar duel) is where two or more guitar players take turns soloing, either with or without a rhythm section. The purpose of the guitar battle is to determine who among each of the guitar players present is the most proficient on the instrument. Often, it begins with the guitarists trading licks and phrases, while gradually increasing the complexity of the technique used. A guitar battle can be said to be over when one guitarist outplays (either through skill, endurance, or the other guitarist(s) acknowledging that they cannot win) all the other guitar players present. This is also known among guitarists as a head-cutting duel or simply as cutting heads.

== Examples ==
The song Dueling Banjos is an example which was made famous by the 1972 film Deliverance.

Near the end of the 1986 film Crossroads, Eugene Martone (played by Ralph Macchio) has a guitar battle with Jack Butler (played by Steve Vai). Macchio's guitar work was actually done by Steve Vai and Ry Cooder.

In the 1991 documentary The Search for Robert Johnson, blues musician Johnny Shines re-enacts a headcutting battle he had with blues legend Robert Johnson on opposing street corners in Helena, Arkansas in the 1930s - to draw away each other's onlookers.

In Tenacious D in The Pick of Destiny (2006), the two protagonists challenge the Devil to a rock duel. This is, apparently, part of the demon code.

A multiplayer game mode introduced in Guitar Hero III: Legends of Rock, called Battle Mode, is based around the guitar battle concept, only the players may use special power-up items to force each other to fail. The game also featured 3 of these guitar battles as boss battles against 2 real-life guitarists(presumably the titular "Legends of Rock"), namely Tom Morello of Rage Against the Machine and Slash of Guns N' Roses, and Lou (a fictional musician representing the Devil of rock music). In Guitar Hero World Tour, the guitarist career features 2 guitar battles against Zakk Wylde and Ted Nugent wherein the player is challenged to a guitar duel by either of the two, and they take turns playing solos of a song specially recorded by either Wylde or Nugent in a manner similar to the existing Face-Off mode, although Battle Mode is still available to play.

Judas Priest used dual guitars in their 1990 song "Metal Meltdown," in which guitarists Glenn Tipton and K.K. Downing take turns playing guitar solos for the first thirty seconds of the song.

The Allman Brothers Band song, "Blue Sky" featured Duane Allman and Dickey Betts trading off lead guitar playing.

"Hangar 18" from the album Rust in Peace features trade solos by Dave Mustaine and Marty Friedman(starting at 3:38). The song ends with Mustaine's solo.
