= Ragged & Dirty (song) =

"Ragged & Dirty" is an old southern blues song, popular in Memphis and other cities of Tennessee and Mississippi. The song was recorded and improvised by many southern blues artists in the 1920s and 1930s, and is still covered by many younger blues musicians.

== Origin ==
This song has many versions. The first version of the song was recorded by Blind Lemon Jefferson as "Broke & Hungry." The song became one of the notable Delta blues songs. It has been covered by many artists, including Sleepy John Estes, appearing in his 1964 album, Broke and Hungry Ragged and Dirty, Too, released by 77 Records. Bob Dylan also covered this song in his album, World Gone Wrong (1993).

== William Brown's version ==
"Ragged And Dirty (Broke & Hungry)"

Song by Willie Brown
- Released: 1942AD
- Recorded: Sadie Beck's Plantation, Arkansas
- Genre: Blues, Delta Blues
- Length: 4:50
- Songwriter: Unknown

The best-known version of this song was played by Delta blues musician William Brown, and recorded by Alan Lomax for the Library of Congress in 1942 on an Arkansas plantation. Many years later, Lomax wrote in his book, Land Where The Blues Began, about the time when Brown sang "Ragged & Dirty", "William Brown began to sing in his sweet, true country voice, poking in delicate guitar passages at every pause, like the guitar was a second voice...". This was not the Willie Brown who had recorded with several notable blues musicians, including Son House and Charley Patton. Brown's version is based on a G chord played in standard tuning, with the guitar capoed at the 7th fret. According to Lomax, Brown played the song on his request, Brown had commented, "Well, I ain't got no voice, but I'll give you the words of an old Memphis song." The first verse of the song is extracted from Blind Lemon Jefferson's "Broke & Hungry" and there is a possibility that the remaining verses in the song might have been extracted from older Delta folk songs.

== Sleepy John Estes' version ==
In 1964, 77 Records released Sleepy John Estes' album, Broke & Hungry, Ragged & Dirty Too. The song "Ragged & Dirty" appears in the album. Estes' version is a little different than both Brown's and Jefferson's versions. However, the song might have been recorded in September 1929 in Memphis, Tennessee, with the Three J's Jug Band. Estes' version was recorded on March 3, 1964, in Chicago, Illinois.

Sleepy John Estes on vocals and guitar.
Yank Rachell on mandolin,
Hammie Nixon on harmonica
Mike Bloomfield on guitar

The first verse is the same as Jefferson's "Broke & Hungry". The next three verses are similar to what Brown had played in 1942, and the next two verses are different than previous versions of this song.

== Bob Dylan's version ==
Bob Dylan recorded "Ragged & Dirty" in 1993 for his album, World Gone Wrong. Dylan's version was mostly influenced by Brown's version, although the two versions of the song had differences in lyrics. Dylan covered the song with acoustic guitar playing similar to that of Brown.
