= Good as I Been to You =

1992 studio album by Bob Dylan

Studio album by Bob Dylan
- Released: November 3, 1992
- Recorded: Mid-1992
- Studios: Bob Dylan's garage studio, Malibu
- Genres: Folk; blues
- Length: 55:31
- Label: Columbia
- Producer: Debbie Gold

Bob Dylan chronology
The Bootleg Series Volumes 1–3 (Rare & Unreleased) 1961–1991 (1991)	Good as I Been to You (1992)	The 30th Anniversary Concert Celebration (1993)

Bob Dylan studio album chronology
Under the Red Sky (1990)	Good as I Been to You (1992)	World Gone Wrong (1993)

Good as I Been to You is the twenty-eighth studio album by American singer-songwriter Bob Dylan, released on November 3, 1992, by Columbia Records. The title comes from the second line of "You're Gonna Quit Me,” which is the eleventh track of the album.

It is composed entirely of traditional folk songs and covers, and is Dylan's first entirely solo, acoustic album since Another Side of Bob Dylan in 1964. It is also his first collection not to feature any original compositions since Dylan in 1973.

On the charts, Good as I Been to You reached No. 51 in the US and No. 18 in the UK, and helped to restore Dylan's critical standing following the disappointing Under the Red Sky. The album's highest chart position worldwide was in Norway, where it peaked at No. 11.

== Recording sessions ==
Since launching the Never Ending Tour in June 1988, traditional covers became a feature at virtually every Dylan concert, often as part of an acoustic set. After recording Under the Red Sky in 1990, Dylan would not release an original song until 1997, and during that time, he would increasingly rely on his stockpile of covers for 'fresh' material. Dylan called these covers "the music that's true for me".

Dylan scheduled studio time at Chicago's Acme Studios in early June 1992, hiring long-time associate David Bromberg as his producer. An album's worth of cover songs were recorded at these sessions with the accompaniment of a full band. The recording engineers were Blaise Barton and Dan White. For reasons unknown, Dylan scrapped the release of this album, deciding to record solo acoustic material instead. Two songs from the Bromberg sessions, "Duncan and Brady" and "Miss the Mississippi", would eventually be released on the album The Bootleg Series Vol. 8: Tell Tale Signs: Rare and Unreleased 1989–2006. All of the songs for Good As I Been to You were recorded later at Dylan's garage studio at his home in Malibu, sessions that are believed to have taken place from late July to early August 1992.

Producer credit was given to Dylan's longtime friend Debbie Gold while Micajah Ryan was credited with engineering and mixing the sessions. Ryan later recalled that "Debbie had a great working relationship with Bob, so that took some of the edge off for me – and for Dylan as well. He consulted Debbie on every take. He trusted her and she was never afraid to tell him the truth, and, boy, was she persistent, often convincing him to stay with a song long after he seemed to lose interest. He’d come in each day with at least a couple of songs to work on. He’d do several takes in every key and tempo until he felt he got it".

== Song selection ==
Dylan recorded a wide range of traditional songs: "Froggie Went A-Courtin'," "Blackjack Davey" and the anti-recruiting "Arthur McBride" were part of the British and Irish tradition of folk songs. "Little Maggie" was a popular bluegrass standard. "Diamond Joe" was well-known thanks to fellow folk revivalist Ramblin' Jack Elliott. "Frankie and Albert" and "Sittin' on Top of the World" both had long, deep roots in folk-blues. Dylan also covered songs that weren't authentically traditional, such as "Tomorrow Night" (best known for Lonnie Johnson's hit version in 1947 and a version by Elvis Presley released in 1965) and Stephen Foster's "Hard Times".

== Outtakes ==
When time came to sequence the album, producer Debbie Gold was unable to convince Dylan to include "You Belong to Me". Though it wasn't authentically traditional, it was popular enough to be covered by Jo Stafford, Patti Page and Dean Martin. The most popular version was recorded by the Duprees, one of the final Italian doo wop groups to make a wave in the early 1960s. Dylan's version from the Good As I Been to You sessions eventually appeared in Oliver Stone's controversial 1994 film Natural Born Killers and on its accompanying soundtrack album.

Stereogum ran an article to coincide with Dylan's 80th birthday on May 24, 2021 in which 80 musicians were asked to name their favorite Dylan song. The Strokes' Albert Hammond Jr. selected "You Belong to Me", noting "It’s just a very powerful song. You can’t explain sometimes how songs hit you...It’s impressive to keep going and still create stuff. It’s one of my favorite songs. Any mix I make for anyone, I put it on there. I know it’s not his. But you can definitely have something that’s not yours and own it. He’s done that a lot".

== Reception and legacy ==
Professional ratings
Review scores
Source	Rating
AllMusic	3/5 stars
Robert Christgau	B+
The Encyclopedia of Popular Music	3/5 stars
MusicHound Rock: The Essential Album Guide	2/5 stars
Orlando Sentinel	3/3 stars
Rolling Stone	4/5 stars

The response to Good as I Been to You was surprisingly positive, particularly for an album with very modest ambitions. It drew comparisons with the acoustic sets featured in Dylan's "Never Ending Tour" shows, drawing much praise for his interpretive skills. A number of critics pointed out that Dylan's voice was now physically ravaged, but the focus was often on the phrasing. "Dylan sounds now, in comparison to his younger self, like one of those ghosts," wrote David Sexton of The Sunday Telegraph, "but a powerful ghost. The effect is not so much nostalgia...as deeply inward".

In a four (out of five) star review in Rolling Stone, critic David Wild wrote: "In its stripped-down intensity, Good As I Been to You recalls the midshow acoustic segments that in recent years have been a consistent highlight of Dylan’s Never Ending Tour. Even more than that, the album’s intimate, almost offhand approach suggests what it would be like to sit backstage with his Bobness while he runs through a set of some of his favorite old songs. This is a passionate, at times almost ragged piece of work that seems to have been recorded rather than produced in any conventional sense".

David Bowie was a fan of both Good as I Been to You and World Gone Wrong, stating in a 1997 interview that "[Dylan's] albums have a great class to them, even those albums where he is actually playing songs of long-dead blues singers".

Spectrum Culture included two of the album's tracks, "Jim Jones" and "Froggie Went a Courtin' " on a 2020 list of "Bob Dylan's 20 Best Songs of the 1990s".

NJArts' Jay Lustig wrote that Good as I Been to You is a "solid but not exactly essential addition to [Dylan's] catalog" and cited "You're Gonna Quit Me" as the highlight of the album.

== Track listing ==
All songs are traditional, arranged by Bob Dylan, except where noted.

Side one
No.	Title	Writer(s)	Length
1.	"Frankie & Albert"	arranged by Mississippi John Hurt	3:50
2.	"Jim Jones"		3:52
3.	"Blackjack Davey"		5:47
4.	"Canadee-i-o"	arranged by Nic Jones	4:20
5.	"Sittin' on Top of the World"	Walter Vinson and Lonnie Chatmon	4:27
6.	"Little Maggie"		2:52
7.	"Hard Times"	Stephen Foster	4:31
Total length:			29:39

Side two
No.	Title	Writer(s)	Length
1.	"Step It Up and Go"		2:54
2.	"Tomorrow Night"	Sam Coslow, Will Grosz	3:42
3.	"Arthur McBride"	arranged by Paul Brady	6:20
4.	"You're Gonna Quit Me"	Blind Blake	2:46
5.	"Diamond Joe"		3:14
6.	"Froggie Went a Courtin'"		6:26
Total length:			25:22

Notes

1. the original album notes incorrectly credit all song arrangements to Bob Dylan.
2. the original album notes correctly identify "Hard Times" as public domain, as it was published in 1855, but the author's name has now been listed for complete accuracy.
3. the original album notes incorrectly identify "Tomorrow Night" as public domain. It was written in 1939 by Sam Coslow and Will Grosz.

== Personnel ==
- Bob Dylan – vocals, guitar, harmonica
- Stephen Marcussen – mastering
- Micajah Ryan – mixing
- Jimmy Wachtel – front cover photography
