= Beauregard, Mississippi =

- Village
- Location of Beauregard, Mississippi
- Coordinates: 31°43′18″N 90°23′17″W
- Country: United States
- State: Mississippi
- County: Copiah

Area
  - Total: 0.92 sq mi (2.39 km^{2})
  - Land: 0.92 sq mi (2.37 km^{2})
  - Water: 0.0077 sq mi (0.02 km^{2})
- Elevation: 463 ft (141 m)

Population (2020)
  - Total: 289
  - Density: 315.5/sq mi (121.82/km^{2})
- Time zone: UTC-6 (Central (CST))
  - Summer (DST): UTC-5 (CDT)
- FIPS code: 28-04540
- GNIS feature ID: 0666684

Beauregard is a village in Copiah County, Mississippi, United States. As of the 2020 census, Beauregard had a population of 289. It is part of the Jackson Metropolitan Statistical Area. Beauregard is named for P. G. T. Beauregard.

== Geography ==
Beauregard is located in southern Copiah County at 31°43′18″N 90°23′17″W (31.721549, -90.388096). It is bordered to the south by the town of Wesson. U.S. Route 51 passes along the western edge of the village, leading north 10 miles (16 km) to Hazlehurst, the county seat, and south 10 miles (16 km) to Brookhaven. Exit 51 on Interstate 55 is 4 miles (6 km) west of the village center on Sylvarena Road.

According to the United States Census Bureau, the village has a total area of 0.93 square miles (2.4 km^{2}), of which 0.008 square miles (0.02 km^{2}), or 0.82%, is water.

== Demographics ==
Historical population
Census	Pop.	Note	%±
1870	315		—
1880	517		64.1%
1900	338		—
1910	240		−29.0%
1920	173		−27.9%
1930	203		17.3%
1940	223		9.9%
1950	231		3.6%
1960	193		−16.5%
1970	199		3.1%
1980	185		−7.0%
1990	206		11.4%
2000	265		28.6%
2010	326		23.0%
2020	289		−11.3%
U.S. Decennial Census

=== Racial and ethnic composition ===
Beauregard village, Mississippi – Racial and ethnic composition Note: the US Census treats Hispanic/Latino as an ethnic category. This table excludes Latinos from the racial categories and assigns them to a separate category. Hispanics/Latinos may be of any race.
Race / Ethnicity (NH = Non-Hispanic)	Pop 2000	Pop 2010	Pop 2020	% 2000	% 2010	% 2020
White alone (NH)	123	186	166	46.42%	57.06%	57.44%
Black or African American alone (NH)	142	131	104	53.58%	40.18%	35.99%
Native American or Alaska Native alone (NH)	0	0	0	0.00%	0.00%	0.00%
Asian alone (NH)	0	0	1	0.00%	0.0%	0.35%
Native Hawaiian or Pacific Islander alone (NH)	0	0	1	0.00%	0.00%	0.35%
Other race alone (NH)	0	0	0	0.00%	0.00%	0.00%
Mixed race or Multiracial (NH)	0	0	4	0.00%	0.00%	1.38%
Hispanic or Latino (any race)	0	9	13	0.00%	2.76%	4.50%
Total	265	326	289	100.00%	100.00%	100.00%

=== 2000 census ===
As of the census of 2000, there were 265 people, 91 households, and 68 families residing in the village. The population density was 290.5 inhabitants per square mile (112.2/km^{2}). There were 94 housing units at an average density of 103.0 per square mile (39.8/km^{2}). The racial makeup of the village was 46.42% White and 53.58% African American.

There were 91 households, out of which 37.4% had children under the age of 18 living with them, 50.5% were married couples living together, 17.6% had a female householder with no husband present, and 24.2% were non-families. 23.1% of all households were made up of individuals, and 4.4% had someone living alone who was 65 years of age or older. The average household size was 2.91 and the average family size was 3.46.

In the village, the population was spread out, with 31.3% under the age of 18, 10.6% from 18 to 24, 28.3% from 25 to 44, 19.6% from 45 to 64, and 10.2% who were 65 years of age or older. The median age was 30 years. For every 100 females, there were 102.3 males. For every 100 females age 18 and over, there were 100.0 males.

The median income for a household in the village was $25,750, and the median income for a family was $34,063. Males had a median income of $32,344 versus $14,063 for females. The per capita income for the village was $11,671. About 15.5% of families and 19.8% of the population were below the poverty line, including 15.1% of those under the age of eighteen and 7.4% of those 65 or over.

== Education ==
Beauregard is served by the Copiah County School District.

== Notable person ==
- Ike Zimmerman, blues guitarist, who is now known to have been musician Robert Johnson's main guitar teacher
