= Iambic Productions =

Television company

Iambic Productions

Iambic Productions Limited is an independent television production company specializing in the fields of music, arts and drama founded by producer Chris Hunt in 1988. The company was a part of production and distribution Group DCD Media since its acquisition by the Group in 2000 until 2008, when Chris Hunt took Iambic back into private ownership

== Programmes ==
Productions include:

- The Truth About Boy Bands (2007)
- ABBA – Thank You For the Music (2006)
- The One and Only Michael Jackson (2006)
- Imagine: The Beatles in 'Love' (2006)
- The People's Chorus (2006)
- Joan Sutherland – The Reluctant Prima Donna (2006)
- Stuart Sutcliffe – The Lost Beatle (2005)
- Elaine Stritch At Liberty (2003 - twice Emmy award winner)
- ABBA – Perfect Hits (2005)
- Maria Callas – Living and Dying for the Art of Love (2004)

== Awards ==
Its producers have won over thirty nominations and awards in most of the major festivals in the world - BAFTA, Emmy, Prix Italia, International New York Festival, Chicago, ACE, Houston Worldfest.

== People ==
- Chris Hunt - Producer / Managing Director
- Steve Cole - director and producer
