= Willie Brown (musician) =

American blues guitarist and vocalist (1900–1952)

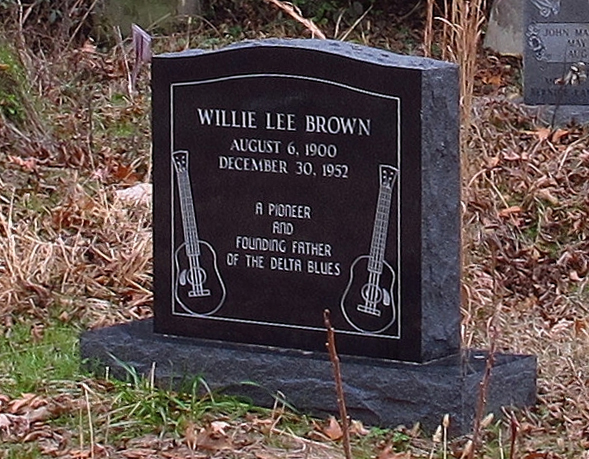
- Brown's grave at Shepard Church, Prichard, Mississippi

Background information
- Born: Willie Lee Brown; 1899 or August 6, 1900; Shelby, Mississippi or, Clarksdale, Mississippi, U.S.
- Died: December 30, 1952 (aged 52/53) Tunica, Mississippi, U.S.
- Genres: Delta blues; country blues
- Instrument: Guitar

Willie Lee Brown (1899 or August 6, 1900 – December 30, 1952) was an American blues guitar player and vocalist. He performed and recorded with other blues musicians, including Son House and Charlie Patton, and influenced Robert Johnson and Muddy Waters. Brown is considered one of the pioneering musicians of the Delta blues genre.

Brown worked as a sideman, performing mostly with House, Patton, and Johnson. He recorded six sides for Paramount Records in Grafton, Wisconsin in 1930, which were subsequently released on 78-rpm discs. He made three recordings for the Library of Congress in 1941, accompanied by House. In 1952, Brown briefly joined House in Rochester, New York, but soon returned to Tunica, Mississippi, where he died the same year.

Although normally an accompanist, Brown recorded three highly rated solo performances: "M & O Blues", "Make Me a Pallet on the Floor" and "Future Blues". He disappeared from the music scene during the 1940s, together with House, and died before the blues revival of the 1960s.

== Life and career ==
He learned to play the guitar as a teenager. He played with such notables as Charley Patton, Son House and Robert Johnson. He was not a self-promoting frontman, preferring to "second" other musicians. Little is known for certain about the man whom Johnson called "my friend Willie Brown" (in his "Cross Road Blues") and whom Johnson once indicated should be notified in event of his death.

Brown played with Patton on "M & O Blues" and "Future Blues", recorded for Paramount Records in 1930. Both songs appear on the album Son House & the Great Delta Blues Singers 1928–1930 (Document Records, 1994) and are also included in the JSP box set of Patton's recordings. At least four other songs Brown recorded for Paramount have never been found.

There has been speculation and some dispute about whether Brown played backup on "Rowdy Blues", and "Mississippi Bottom Blues", 1929 songs credited to Kid Bailey, or recorded it himself using the name of Kid Bailey.

The musicologist David Evans reconstructed the early biography of a Willie Brown living in Drew, Mississippi, until 1929. He was married by 1911, when he was 10 or 11(?), to a proficient guitarist named Josie Mills. He is recalled as singing and playing guitar with Patton and others in the neighborhood of Drew. Informants with conflicting memories led Gayle Dean Wardlow and Steve Calt to conclude that this was a different Willie Brown. Evans rejected this conclusion, believing that the singing and guitar style of the 1931 recordings is in the tradition of other performers from Drew, such as Patton, Tommy Johnson, Kid Bailey, Howlin' Wolf and artists not commercially recorded.

Alan Lomax, writing in 1993, suggested that the William Brown he recorded in Arkansas in 1942 was the same man as the Paramount artist. The recording was for a joint project between Fisk University and the Library of Congress documenting the music of Coahoma County, Mississippi, in 1941 and 1942. Writing over fifty years later, Lomax seemed to have forgotten that he had actually recorded Brown the previous summer with Son House, Fiddlin' Joe Martin and Leroy Williams. Brown played second guitar on three performances by the group and recorded one solo, "Make Me a Pallet on the Floor". Willie Brown also played "Ragged & Dirty". According to Lomax, after Willie played "Ragged & Dirty" for him, Brown quoted, "That's the blues, that's the Delta blues."

The later biography is more clear. Brown lived in Robinsonville, Mississippi from 1929 and moved to Lake Cormorant, Mississippi by 1935. He performed occasionally with Charley Patton and continually with Son House until his death.

Brown died of heart disease in Tunica, Mississippi, in 1952.

== Discography ==
Brown recorded six sides at a 1930 recording session in Grafton, Wisconsin. They were released on three 78-rpm shellac discs, of which only one has been found. Of the three sides known to exist below, all were issued on the 2001 Charley Patton box set.

- Paramount 13001: "Grandma Blues" / "Sorry Blues" (no copy has been found)
- Paramount 13090: "M & O Blues" / "Future Blues" (only six copies are known)
- Paramount 13099: "Window Blues" / "Kicking in My Sleep Blues" (no copy has been found)
- Library of Congress recording by Lomax: "Make Me a Pallet on the Floor"

== See also ==
- Crossroads (1986 film)
- List of Delta blues musicians
