= Ishmon Bracey =

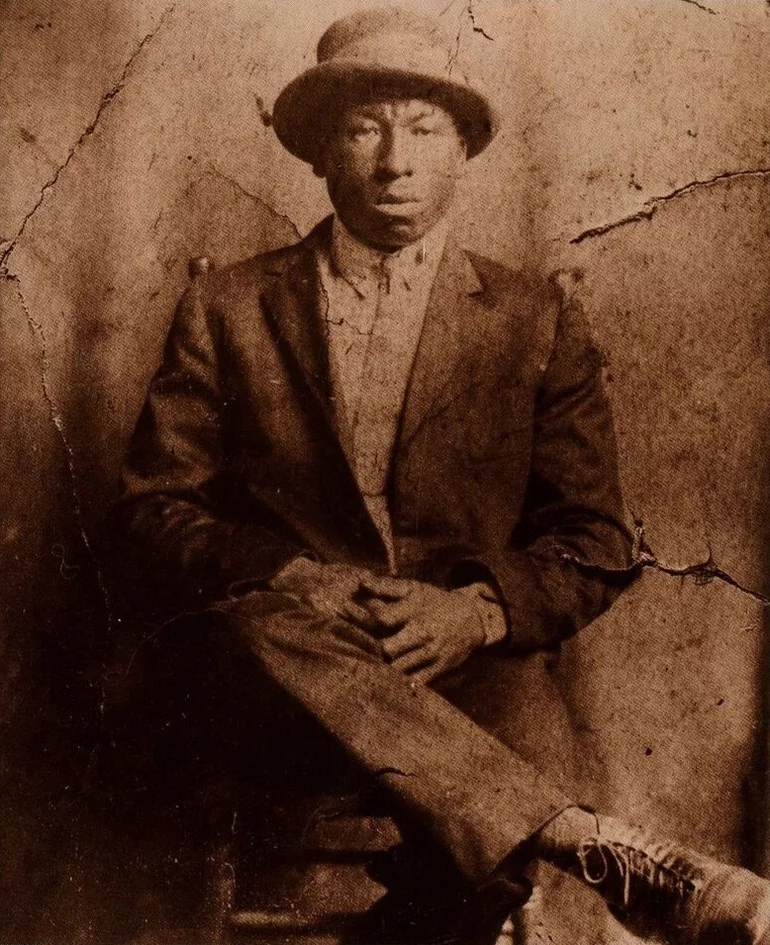
- Bracey, c. 1925

Background information
- Also known as: Ishman Bracey; Ishmael Adams
- Born: January 9, 1899 or 1901; Byram, Mississippi, U.S.
- Died: February 12, 1970 (aged 69-71) Jackson, Mississippi, U.S.
- Genres: Delta blues, country blues
- Instruments: Guitar
- Years active: 1910s–1951

Ishmon Bracey (January 9, 1899 or 1901 – February 12, 1970), sometimes credited as Ishman Bracey, was an American Delta blues singer-guitarist. Alongside his contemporary Tommy Johnson, Bracey was a highly influential bluesman in Jackson, Mississippi, and was one of the area's earliest figures to record blues material. Bracey's recordings include "Trouble Hearted Blues" and "Left Alone Blues", both of which appear on several compilation albums.

== Biography ==
Bracey was born in the small town of Byram, Mississippi. Most sources give his birth year as 1901, but researchers Bob Eagle and Eric LeBlanc give 1899, based on 1900 census information. Ishmon's parents were Richard and Etta Bracey. Bracey learned how to play the particular guitar style of bottlenecking from local blues musicians Rubin Lacey and Louis Cooper. He began his music career by performing at dances, juke joints, fish fries, and other rural events before relocating to Jackson in the late 1910s. Talent scout H. C. Speir approached Bracey while he was performing on Mill Street in 1927 with the intent of recording the musician for Victor Records. On February 4, 1928, Bracey completed his first two sides for the label, "Saturday Blues" and "Left Alone Blues", at the Memphis Auditorium with Papa Charlie McCoy providing the backup guitar lines. Bracey and McCoy returned to Memphis on August 31 to record seven additional songs.

In most of his recordings, Bracey used distinctive variations on the usual three-line verse form of blues songs, and was one of the few Mississippi bluesmen who sang with a nasal tone without embellishment. Bracey returned to the studio in 1929 and early-1930 for Paramount Records, backed by the group the New Orleans Nehi Boys. The band featured Kid Ernest Michall on clarinet and Charles Taylor (who Bracey accompanied on four sides of his own) on piano, both unusual instruments to appear on Mississippi Delta blues recordings. Like his associate Tommy Johnson, Bracey's total discography is relatively limited with only 16 songs, and original copies of his 78-rpm records are among the most valued items sought by blues collectors. His compositions "Trouble Hearted Blues" and "Left Alone Blues" are his most recognized works.

He was an associate of Johnson's, and the two performed regularly together on the medicine show circuit in the early 1930s. Bracey played the blues until 1951 when he was ordained as a Baptist minister. Although he would no longer partake in making blues music, Bracey still helped music historian Gayle Dean Wardlow in 1963 gather information on Delta blues musicians, most notably Skip James. Bracey died on February 12, 1970; he is buried in Willow Park Cemetery in Jackson. Ishmon Bracey pastored a church in Canton, Mississippi, at the time of his death.

== Discography ==
- The Famous 1928 Tommy Johnson–Ishman Bracey Session (Roots, 1970)
- Complete Recordings in Chronological Order (Wolf, 1983)
- Ishman Bracey & Charley Taylor 1928–1929 (Document, 2000)
- King of the Blues, vol. 12 (P-Vine, 2003)
- Suitcase Full of Blues (Monk, 2010)

== See also ==
- List of country blues musicians
