= Tommy Johnson (guitarist) =

American Delta blues musician (1896–1956)

- The only known verified photograph of Tommy Johnson

Background information
- Born: January 1896 near Terry, Mississippi, U.S.
- Died: November 1, 1956 (aged 60) Crystal Springs, Mississippi, U.S.
- Genres: Delta blues
- Occupations: Musician; songwriter
- Instruments: Guitar; vocals
- Years active: 1914–1956
- Labels: Victor; Paramount

Tommy Johnson (January 1896 – November 1, 1956) was an American Delta blues musician who recorded in the late 1920s and was known for his eerie falsetto voice and intricate guitar playing.

== Early life ==
Johnson was born near Terry, Mississippi, and in about 1910 moved to Crystal Springs, where he lived for most of his life. He learned to play the guitar and, by 1914, was supplementing his income by playing at local parties with his brothers Major and LeDell. In 1916 Johnson married and moved to Webb Jennings' plantation near Drew, Mississippi, close to the Dockery Plantation. There he met other musicians, including Charlie Patton and Willie Brown.

== Career ==
By 1920, Johnson was an itinerant musician based in Crystal Springs but traveling widely around the South, sometimes accompanied by Papa Charlie McCoy. In 1928, he made his first recordings, with McCoy, for Victor Records, including "Canned Heat Blues", in which he sang of drinking methanol from the cooking fuel Sterno. The song features the refrain "canned heat, mama, sure, Lord, killing me." The blues group Canned Heat took their name from this song. Johnson's "Big Road Blues" inspired Canned Heat's song "On the Road Again". A significantly different version of the song appears as "Canned Heat" on the album Big Road Blues by K. C. Douglas.

Johnson recorded two further sessions, for Victor in August 1928 and for Paramount Records in December 1929. He did not record again, mistakenly believing that he had signed away his right to record. Some suggest he had been intentionally given this misimpression by people at Paramount Records. This resulted in a legal settlement with the Mississippi Sheiks, who had used the melody of Johnson's "Big Road Blues" in their successful "Stop and Listen". Johnson was party to the copyright settlement but was too drunk at the time to understand what he had signed.

Johnson's recordings established him as the premier Delta blues vocalist of his day, with a powerful voice that could go from a growl to a falsetto. He was an accomplished guitarist. He also performed tricks with his guitar, playing it between his legs and behind his head and throwing it in the air while playing.

His style influenced later blues singers, such as Robert Nighthawk and Howlin' Wolf (whose song "I Asked for Water [She Brought Me Gasoline]" was based on Johnson's "Cool Drink of Water Blues"). Johnson was a talented composer, blending fragments of folk poetry and personalized lyrics into set guitar accompaniments to craft striking blues compositions such as "Maggie Campbell".

To enhance his fame, Johnson cultivated a sinister persona. According to his brother LeDell, he claimed to have sold his soul to the Devil at a crossroads in exchange for his mastery of the guitar. This story was later also associated with Robert Johnson, to whom Tommy Johnson was unrelated.

Johnson remained a popular performer in the Jackson area through the 1930s and 1940s, sometimes performing with Ishman Bracey. He influenced other performers, partly because he was willing to teach his style and his repertoire. His influence on local traditions is described by David Evans in the books Tommy Johnson (1971) and Big Road Blues: Tradition and Creativity in the Folk Blues (1982).

== Death and memorial ==
Johnson died of a heart attack after playing at a local party in 1956. He is buried in the Warm Springs Methodist Church Cemetery, outside Crystal Springs, Mississippi. In April, 2000, Johnson family members gave permission for a headstone to be placed on Johnson's grave organized through the Mount Zion Memorial Fund, a Mississippi nonprofit corporation active in historic African American cemetery preservation since 1989. Underwriting for the memorial was obtained through the support of blues musician Bonnie Raitt. A large granite memorial, engraved with Johnson’s portrait and featuring several of his best-known songs, was unveiled in October 2001 in Crystal Springs at the family’s request. Its placement on his grave was delayed for 10 years due to a dispute between his family, led by his niece Vera Johnson Collins, the surrounding property owners, and the Copiah County Board of Supervisors over a deteriorated access road. The dispute was resolved in October 2012 thanks in large part to research work done by University of Mississippi researcher T.D. Moore. It was finally announced that the headstone would be erected on October 26 of that year. The headstone had been on public display in the Crystal Springs Public Library since being unveiled on October 20, 2001. On the night of Saturday, February 2, 2013, the headstone fell and was damaged. It is a matter of dispute whether it fell because it was inadequately secured or because it was pushed over or deliberately smashed.

The Tommy Johnson Blues Festival is held annually in Crystal Springs on the third weekend in October. The inaugural festival was held in Jackson and Crystal Springs in 2006.

== In fiction ==
In the film O Brother, Where Art Thou? (2000), a character named Tommy Johnson, played by Chris Thomas King, describes selling his soul to the devil to play guitar. The Tommy Johnson character in the film plays a number of songs originally recorded by the blues musician Skip James and accompanies the Soggy Bottom Boys, a band consisting of the film's three main protagonists plus Johnson, on "Man of Constant Sorrow".

The story of Johnson's selling his soul to the devil was first told by his brother, LaDell Johnson, and reported by David Evans in his 1971 biography of Johnson. This legend was subsequently attributed to the unrelated blues musician Robert Johnson.

== Discography ==
Victor Records, 1928, Memphis, Tennessee

- "Cool Drink of Water Blues"
- "Big Road Blues"
- "Bye-Bye Blues"
- "Maggie Campbell Blues"
- "Canned Heat Blues"
- "Lonesome Home Blues" (take 1)
- "Lonesome Home Blues" (take 2)
- "Louisiana Blues" (unissued test)
- "Big Fat Mama Blues"

Paramount Records, 1929, Grafton, Wisconsin

- "I Wonder to Myself"
- "Slidin' Delta"
- "Lonesome Home Blues"
- Untitled song, take 1 ("Morning Prayer Blues")
- Untitled song, take 2 ("Boogaloosa Woman")
- "Black Mare Blues" (take 1)
- "Black Mare Blues" (take 2)
- "Ridin' Horse"
- "Alcohol and Jake Blues"
- "I Want Someone to Love Me"
- "Button Up Shoes" (unissued test)
