= Robert Johnson =

American blues musician and songwriter (1911–1938)

- Johnson in 1936

Background information
- Born: Robert Leroy Johnson; May 8, 1911; Hazlehurst, Mississippi, U.S.
- Died: August 16, 1938 (aged 27) Greenwood, Mississippi, U.S.
- Genre: Delta blues
- Occupations: Musician; singer; songwriter
- Instruments: Guitar; vocals; harmonica
- Years active: 1929–1938
- Label: Vocalion

Robert Leroy Johnson (May 8, 1911 – August 16, 1938) was an American blues musician and songwriter. His singing, guitar playing, and songwriting on his landmark 1936 and 1937 recordings have influenced later generations of musicians. Although his recording career spanned only seven months, he is recognized as a master of the blues, particularly the Delta blues style, and as one of the most influential musicians of the 20th century. The Rock and Roll Hall of Fame describes him as perhaps "the first ever rock star".

As a traveling performer who played mostly on street corners, in juke joints, and at Saturday night dances, Johnson had little commercial success or public recognition in his lifetime. He had only two recording sessions both produced by Don Law, one in San Antonio in 1936, and one in Dallas in 1937, that produced 29 distinct songs (with 13 surviving alternate takes). These songs, recorded solo in improvised studios, were the sum of his recorded output. Most were released as 10-inch, 78 rpm singles from 1937 to 1938, with a few released after his death. Other than these recordings, very little was known of his life outside of the small musical circuit in the Mississippi Delta where he spent most of his time. Much of his story has been reconstructed by researchers. Johnson's poorly documented life and death have given rise to legends. The one most often associated with him is that he sold his soul to the devil at a local crossroads in return for musical success.

His music had a small but influential following during his life and in the decades after his death. In late 1938, John Hammond sought him out for a concert at Carnegie Hall, From Spirituals to Swing, only to discover that Johnson had recently died. Hammond was a producer for Columbia Records which bought Johnson's original recordings from Brunswick Records which owned them. The musicologist Alan Lomax went to Mississippi in 1941 to record Johnson, also not knowing of his death. In 1961, Columbia released an album of Johnson's recordings titled King of the Delta Blues Singers, produced by legendary producer and music historian Frank Driggs. It is credited with finally bringing Johnson's work to a wider audience. The album would become influential, especially in the nascent British blues movement; Eric Clapton called Johnson "the most important blues singer that ever lived". Bob Dylan, Keith Richards, and Robert Plant have cited both Johnson's lyrics and musicianship as key influences on their own work. Many of Johnson's songs have been covered over the years, becoming hits for other artists, and his guitar licks and lyrics have been borrowed by many later musicians.

Renewed interest in Johnson's work and life led to a burst of scholarship starting in the 1960s. Much of what is known about him was reconstructed by researchers such as Gayle Dean Wardlow and Bruce Conforth, especially in their 2019 award-winning biography of Johnson: Up Jumped the Devil: The Real Life of Robert Johnson (Chicago Review Press). Two films, the 1991 documentary The Search for Robert Johnson by John Hammond Jr., and a 1997 documentary, Can't You Hear the Wind Howl?: The Life & Music of Robert Johnson, which included reconstructed scenes with Keb' Mo' as Johnson, attempted to document his life, and demonstrated the difficulties arising from the scant historical record and conflicting oral accounts. Over the years, the significance of Johnson and his music has been recognized by the Rock and Roll, Grammy, and Blues Halls of Fame, and by the National Recording Preservation Board.

== Life and career ==
=== Early life ===
Robert Leroy Johnson was born in Hazlehurst, Mississippi, possibly on May 8, 1911, to Julia Major Dodds (born October 1874) and Noah Johnson (born December 1884). Julia was married to Charles Dodds (born February 1865), a relatively prosperous landowner and furniture maker, with whom she had ten children. Charles Dodds had been forced by a lynch mob to leave Hazlehurst following a dispute with white landowners. Julia left Hazlehurst with baby Robert, but in less than two years she took the boy to Memphis to live with her husband, who had changed his name to Charles Spencer. Robert spent the next 8–9 years growing up in Memphis and attending the Carnes Avenue Colored School where he received lessons in arithmetic, reading, language, music, geography, and physical exercise. It was in Memphis that he acquired his love for, and knowledge of, the blues and popular music. His education and city upbringing placed him apart from most of his contemporary blues musicians.

Robert rejoined his mother around 1919–1920 after she married an illiterate sharecropper named Will "Dusty" Willis. They originally settled on a plantation in Lucas Township in Crittenden County, Arkansas, but soon moved across the Mississippi River to Commerce in the Mississippi Delta, near Tunica and Robinsonville. They lived on the Abbay & Leatherman Plantation. Julia's new husband was 24 years her junior. Robert was remembered by some residents as "Little Robert Dusty", but he was registered at Tunica's Indian Creek School as Robert Spencer. In the 1920 census, he is listed as Robert Spencer, living in Lucas, Arkansas, with Will and Julia Willis. Robert was at school in 1924 and 1927. The quality of his signature on his marriage certificate suggests that he was relatively well educated for a man of his background. A school friend, Willie Coffee, who was interviewed and filmed in later life, recalled that as a youth Robert was already noted for playing the harmonica and jaw harp. Coffee recalled that Robert was absent for long periods, which suggests that he may have been living and studying in Memphis.

Once Julia informed Robert about his biological father, Robert adopted the surname Johnson, using it on the certificate of his marriage to fourteen-year-old Virginia Travis in February 1929. She died in childbirth shortly after. Surviving relatives of Virginia told the blues researcher Robert "Mack" McCormick that this was a divine punishment for Robert's decision to sing secular songs, known as "selling your soul to the Devil". McCormick believed that Johnson himself accepted the phrase as a description of his resolve to abandon the settled life of a husband and farmer to become a full-time blues musician. Grieving the loss of his wife and child, Robert disappeared for about 18 months. At the time, no one knew where he went, but it is now largely assumed that Robert left Robinsonville for the area around Martinsville, close to his birthplace, possibly searching for his natural father. Here he mastered the guitar style of House and learned other styles from Isaiah "Ike" Zimmerman. Zimmerman was rumored to have learned supernaturally to play guitar by visiting graveyards at midnight.

Around this time, the blues musician Son House moved to Robinsonville, where his musical partner Willie Brown lived. Late in life, House remembered Johnson as a little boy who was a competent harmonica player but an embarrassingly bad guitarist. When Johnson next appeared in Robinsonville, he seemed to have miraculously developed a mature guitar technique. House was interviewed at a time when the legend of Johnson's pact with the devil was well known among blues researchers. He was asked whether he attributed Johnson's technique to this pact, and his equivocal answers have been taken as confirmation.

While living in Martinsville, Johnson fathered a child with Virgie Jane Smith, but her religious family forbade the musician from maintaining a relationship with the mother or child. He married Caletta Craft in May 1931. In 1932, the couple settled for a while in Clarksdale, Mississippi, in the Delta, but Johnson soon left for a career as a "walking" or itinerant musician, and Caletta died in early 1933.

=== Itinerant musician ===
From 1932 until his death in 1938, Johnson moved frequently between the cities of Memphis and Helena, and the smaller towns of the Mississippi Delta and neighboring regions of Mississippi and Arkansas. On occasion, he traveled much further. The blues musician Johnny Shines accompanied him to Chicago, Texas, New York, Canada, Kentucky, and Indiana. Henry Townsend worked with him in St. Louis. In many places he stayed with members of his large extended family or with female friends. He did not marry again but formed some long-term relationships with women to whom he would return periodically. In other places he stayed with whatever woman he was able to seduce at his performance. In each location, Johnson's hosts were largely ignorant of his life elsewhere. He used different names in different places, employing at least eight distinct surnames.

Biographers have looked for consistency from musicians who knew Johnson in different contexts: Shines, who traveled extensively with him; Robert Lockwood Jr., who knew him as his mother's partner; David "Honeyboy" Edwards, whose cousin Willie Mae Powell had a relationship with Johnson. From a mass of partial, conflicting, and inconsistent eyewitness accounts, biographers have attempted to summarize Johnson's character. "He was well mannered, he was soft spoken, he was indecipherable". "As for his character, everyone seems to agree that, while he was pleasant and outgoing in public, in private he was reserved and liked to go his own way". "Musicians who knew Johnson testified that he was a nice guy and fairly average—except, of course, for his musical talent, his weakness for whiskey and women, and his commitment to the road".

When Johnson arrived in a new town, he would play for tips on street corners or in front of the local barbershop or a restaurant. Musical associates have said that in live performances Johnson often did not focus on his dark and complex original compositions, but instead pleased audiences by performing more well-known pop standards of the day – and not necessarily blues. With an ability to pick up tunes at first hearing, he had no trouble giving his audiences what they wanted, and certain of his contemporaries later remarked on his interest in jazz and country music. He also had an uncanny ability to establish a rapport with his audience; in every town in which he stopped, he would establish ties to the local community that would serve him well when he passed through again a month or a year later.

Shines was 20 when he met Johnson in 1936. He estimated Johnson was maybe a year older than himself (Johnson was actually four years older). Shines is quoted describing Johnson in Samuel Charters's Robert Johnson:

Robert was a very friendly person, even though he was sulky at times, you know. And I hung around Robert for quite a while. One evening he disappeared. He was kind of a peculiar fellow. Robert'd be standing up playing some place, playing like nobody's business. At about that time it was a hustle with him as well as a pleasure. And money'd be coming from all directions. But Robert'd just pick up and walk off and leave you standing there playing. And you wouldn't see Robert no more maybe in two or three weeks. ... So Robert and I, we began journeying off. I was just, matter of fact, tagging along.

During this time Johnson established what would be a relatively long-term relationship with Estella Coleman, a woman about 15 years his senior and the mother of the blues musician Robert Lockwood Jr. Johnson reportedly cultivated a woman to look after him in each town he played in. He reputedly asked homely young women living in the country with their families whether he could go home with them, and in most cases, he was accepted, until a boyfriend arrived or Johnson was ready to move on.

In 1941, Alan Lomax learned from Muddy Waters that Johnson had performed in the area around Clarksdale, Mississippi. By 1959, the historian Samuel Charters could add only that Will Shade, of the Memphis Jug Band, remembered Johnson had once briefly played with him in West Memphis, Arkansas. In the last year of his life, Johnson is believed to have traveled to St. Louis, Chicago, Detroit, and New York City. In 1938, Columbia Records producer John H. Hammond, who owned some of Johnson's records, directed record producer Don Law to seek out Johnson to book him for the first "From Spirituals to Swing" concert at Carnegie Hall in New York. On learning of Johnson's death, Hammond replaced him with Big Bill Broonzy, but he played two of Johnson's records from the stage.

=== Recording sessions ===
In Jackson, Mississippi, around 1936, Johnson sought out H. C. Speir, who ran a general store and also acted as a talent scout. Speir put Johnson in touch with Ernie Oertle, who, as a salesman for the ARC group of labels, introduced Johnson to Don Law to record his first sessions in San Antonio, Texas. The recording session was held on November 23–25, 1936, in room 414 of the Gunter Hotel in San Antonio. In the ensuing three-day session, Johnson played 16 selections and recorded alternate takes for most of them. Among the songs Johnson recorded in San Antonio were "I Believe I'll Dust My Broom", "Sweet Home Chicago", and "Cross Road Blues", which later became blues standards. The first to be released was Vocalion 3416 "Terraplane Blues", backed with "Kind Hearted Woman Blues" which sold as many as 10,000 copies. Vocalion 3445 featured "Last Fair Deal Gone Down", and "32-20 Blues."

Johnson traveled to Dallas, Texas, for another recording session with Don Law in a makeshift studio at the Vitagraph (Warner Bros.) Building, on June 19–20, 1937. Johnson recorded almost half of the 29 songs that make up his entire discography in Dallas and eleven records from this session were released within the following year. Most of Johnson's "somber and introspective" songs and performances come from his second recording session. Johnson did two takes of most of these songs, and recordings of those takes survived. Because of this, there is more opportunity to compare different performances of a single song by Johnson than for any other blues performer of his era. In contrast to most Delta players, Johnson had absorbed the idea of fitting a composed song into the three minutes of a 78-rpm side.

== Death ==
Johnson died on August 16, 1938, at the age of 27, near Greenwood, Mississippi, of unknown causes. His death was not reported publicly. Almost 30 years later, Gayle Dean Wardlow, a Mississippi-based musicologist researching Johnson's life, found his death certificate, which listed only the date and location, with no official cause of death. No formal autopsy had been done. Instead, a pro forma examination was done to file the death certificate, and no immediate cause of death was determined. It is likely he had congenital syphilis, and it was suspected later by medical professionals that this may have been a contributing factor in his death. However, 30 years of local oral tradition had, like the rest of his life story, built a legend which has filled in gaps in the scant historical record.

Several different accounts have described the events preceding his death. Johnson had been playing for a few weeks at a country dance at the Three Forks Club in Itta Bena, about 15 miles (24 km) from Greenwood. According to one theory, Johnson was murdered by the jealous husband of a woman with whom he had flirted. In an account by the blues musician David "Honeyboy" Edwards, Johnson had been flirting with a married woman at a dance, and she gave him a bottle of whiskey poisoned by her husband. When Johnson took the bottle, Edwards knocked it out of his hand, admonishing him to never drink from a bottle that he had not personally seen opened. Johnson replied, "Don't ever knock a bottle out of my hand". Soon after, he was offered another (poisoned) bottle and accepted it. Johnson is reported to have begun feeling ill the evening after and had to be helped back to his room in the early morning hours. Over the next three days his condition steadily worsened. Witnesses reported that he died in a convulsive state of severe pain. The musicologist Robert "Mack" McCormick claimed to have tracked down the man who murdered Johnson and to have obtained a confession from him in a personal interview, but he declined to reveal the man's name.

While strychnine has been suggested as the poison that killed Johnson, at least one scholar has disputed the notion. Tom Graves, in his book Crossroads: The Life and Afterlife of Blues Legend Robert Johnson, relies on expert testimony from toxicologists to argue that strychnine has such a distinctive odor and taste that it cannot be disguised, even in strong liquor. Graves also claims that a significant amount of strychnine would have to be consumed in one sitting to be fatal, and that death from the poison would occur within hours, not days.

In their 2019 book Up Jumped the Devil, Bruce Conforth and Gayle Dean Wardlow suggest that the poison was naphthalene, from dissolved mothballs. This was "a common way of poisoning people in the rural South", but was rarely fatal. However, Johnson had been diagnosed with an ulcer and with esophageal varices, and the poison was sufficient to cause them to hemorrhage. He died after two days of severe abdominal pain, vomiting, and bleeding from the mouth.

The Leflore County registrar, Cornelia Jordan, years later and after conducting an investigation into Johnson's death for the state director of vital statistics, R. N. Whitfield, wrote a clarifying note on the back of Johnson's death certificate:

I talked with the white man on whose place this negro died and I also talked with a negro woman on the place. The plantation owner said the negro man, seemingly about 26 years old, came from Tunica two or three weeks before he died to play banjo at a negro dance given there on the plantation. He stayed in the house with some of the negroes saying he wanted to pick cotton. The white man did not have a doctor for this negro as he had not worked for him. He was buried in a homemade coffin furnished by the county. The plantation owner said it was his opinion that the man died of syphilis.

In 2006, a medical practitioner, David Connell, suggested, on the basis of photographs showing Johnson's "unnaturally long fingers" and "one bad eye", that Johnson may have had Marfan syndrome, which could have both affected his guitar playing and contributed to his death due to aortic dissection.

=== Gravesite ===
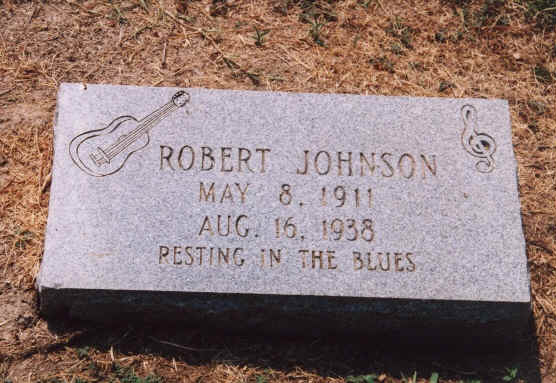
Alleged gravesite at Payne Chapel near Quito, with one of Johnson's three tombstones

The true location of Johnson's grave is unknown; three different markers have been erected at possible sites in church cemeteries outside Greenwood.

- Research in the 1980s and 1990s strongly suggests Johnson was buried in the graveyard of the Mount Zion Missionary Baptist Church near Morgan City, Mississippi, not far from Greenwood, in an unmarked grave. A one-ton cenotaph in the shape of an obelisk, listing all of Johnson's song titles, with a central inscription by Peter Guralnick, was placed at this location in 1990, paid for by Columbia Records and numerous smaller contributions made through the Mount Zion Memorial Fund.
- In 1990, a small marker with the epitaph "Resting in the Blues" was placed in the cemetery of Payne Chapel, near Quito, Mississippi, by an Atlanta rock group named the Tombstones, after they saw a photograph in Living Blues magazine of an unmarked spot alleged by one of Johnson's ex-girlfriends to be Johnson's burial site.
- More recent research by Stephen LaVere (including statements from Rosie Eskridge, the wife of the supposed gravedigger, in 2000) indicates that the actual grave site is under a big pecan tree in the cemetery of the Little Zion Church, north of Greenwood along Money Road. Through LaVere, Sony Music placed a marker at this site, which bears LaVere's name as well as Johnson's. Researchers Bruce Conforth and Gayle Dean Wardlow also concluded this was Johnson's resting place in their 2019 biography.

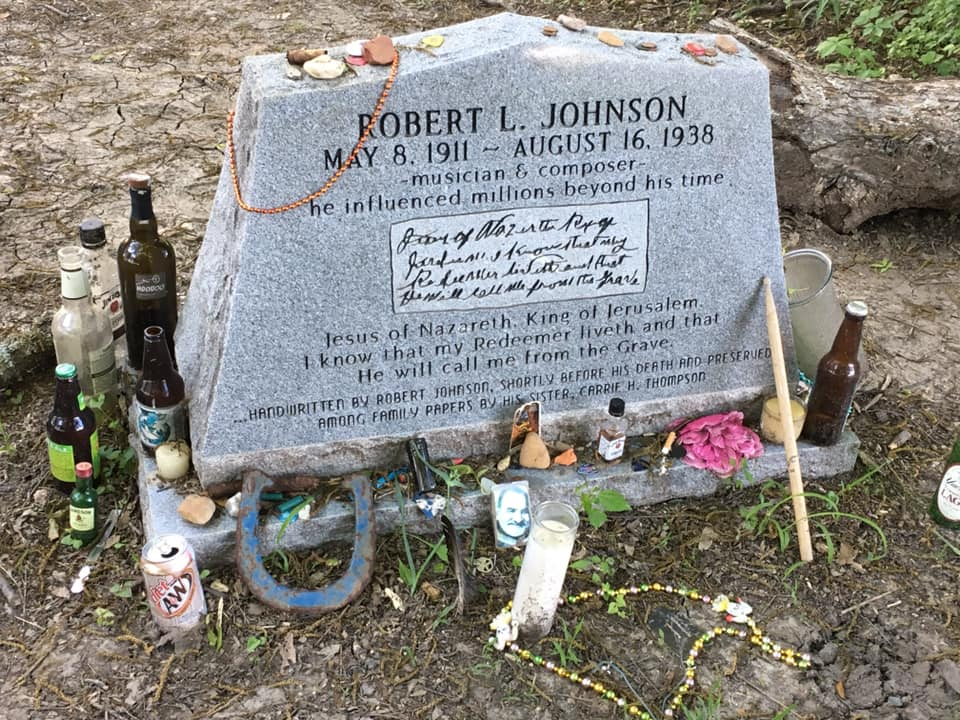
Alleged gravesite at Little Zion Church north of Greenwood

John Hammond Jr., in the documentary The Search for Robert Johnson (1991), suggests that owing to poverty and lack of transportation Johnson is most likely to have been buried in a pauper's grave (or "potter's field") very near where he died.

== Devil legend ==
A popular legend emerged alleging that Johnson made a deal with the Devil at a crossroads in exchange for his musical ability, mirroring the legend of Faust. According to the story, as a young man living on a plantation in rural Mississippi, Johnson had a tremendous desire to become a great blues musician. One of the legends often told says that Johnson was instructed to take his guitar to a crossroad near Dockery Plantation at midnight. (There are claims for other sites as the location of the crossroads.) There he was met by a large being (the Devil) who took the guitar and tuned it. The Devil played a few songs and then returned the guitar to Johnson, giving him mastery of the instrument. In exchange for his soul, Johnson was able to create the blues for which he became famous.

This story was originally associated with Delta blues musician Tommy Johnson, to whom Robert Johnson was unrelated. Tommy Johnson, who grew up near the Dockery Plantation and learned the blues from Charlie Patton and Willie Brown, first claimed to have sold his soul to the devil at a crossroads in exchange for his mastery of the guitar.

=== Various accounts ===
This legend was developed over time and has been chronicled by Gayle Dean Wardlow, Edward Komara and Elijah Wald, who sees the legend as largely dating from Johnson's rediscovery by white fans more than two decades after his death. Son House once told the story to Pete Welding as an explanation of Johnson's astonishingly rapid mastery of the guitar. Other interviewers failed to elicit any confirmation from House and there were two full years between House's observation of Johnson as first a novice and then a master.

Further details were absorbed from the imaginative retellings by Greil Marcus and Robert Palmer. Most significantly, the detail was added that Johnson received his gift from a large black man at a crossroads. There is dispute as to how and when the crossroads detail was attached to the Robert Johnson story. All the published evidence, including a full chapter on the subject in the biography Crossroads, by Tom Graves, suggests an origin in the story of the blues musician Tommy Johnson. This story was collected from his musical associate Ishman Bracey and his elder brother Ledell in the 1960s. One version of Ledell Johnson's account was published in David Evans's 1971 biography of Tommy Johnson, and was repeated in print in 1982 alongside House's story in the widely read Searching for Robert Johnson, by Peter Guralnick.

In another version, Ledell placed the meeting not at a crossroads but in a graveyard. This resembles the story told to Steve LaVere that Ike Zimmerman of Hazlehurst, Mississippi, learned to play the guitar at midnight while sitting on tombstones. Zimmerman is believed to have influenced the playing of the young Johnson.

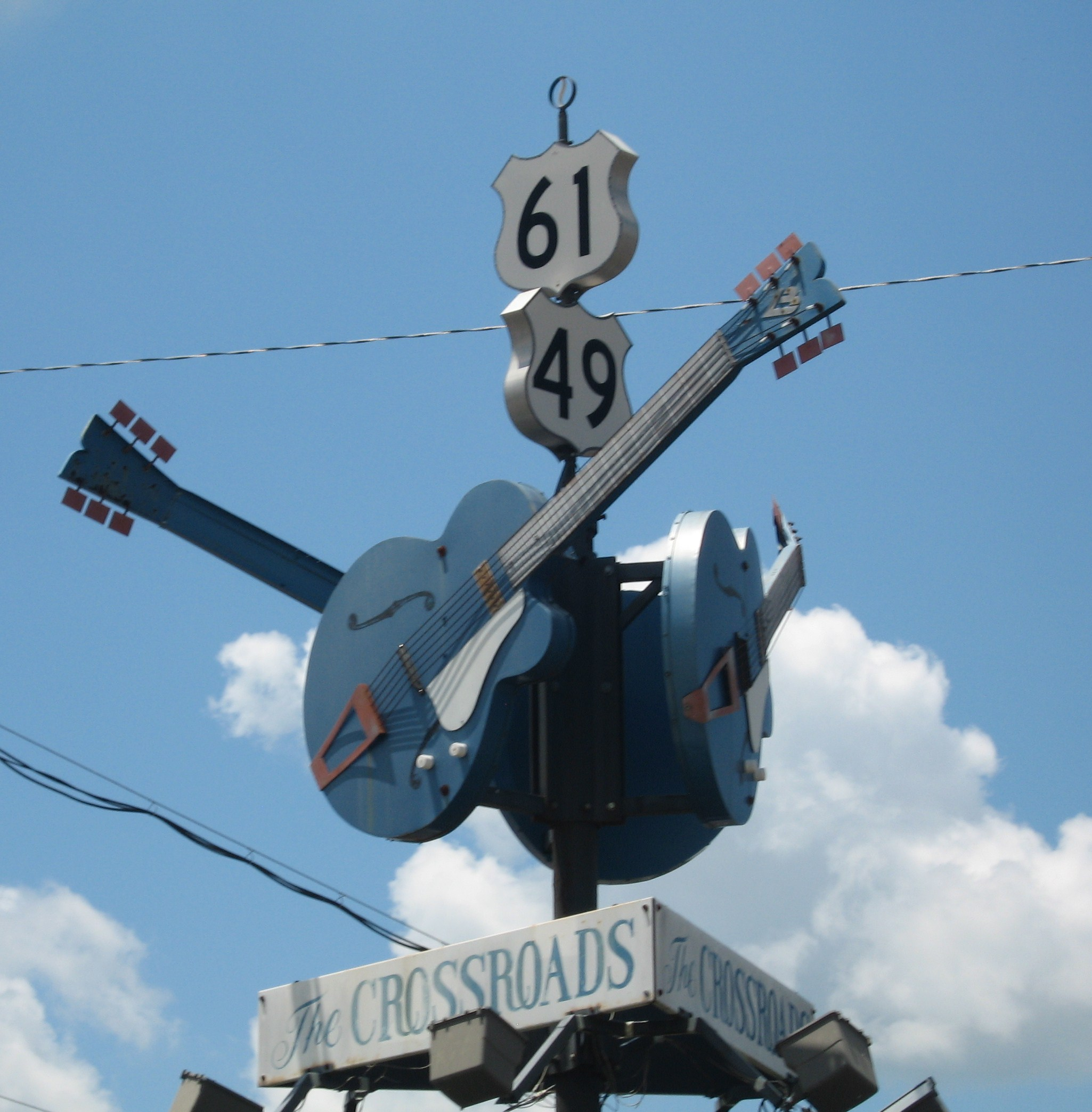
The crossroads at Clarksdale, Mississippi

Recent research by the blues scholar Bruce Conforth, in Living Blues magazine, makes the story clearer. Johnson and Ike Zimmerman did practice in a graveyard at night, because it was quiet and no one would disturb them, but it was not the Hazlehurst cemetery as had been believed: Zimmerman was not from Hazlehurst but nearby Beauregard, and he did not practice in one graveyard, but in several in the area. Johnson spent about a year living with and learning from Zimmerman, who ultimately accompanied Johnson back to the Delta to look after him.

While Dockery, Hazlehurst and Beauregard have each been claimed as the locations of the mythical crossroads, there are also tourist attractions claiming to be "The Crossroads" in both Clarksdale and Memphis. Residents of Rosedale, Mississippi, claim Johnson sold his soul to the devil at the intersection of Highways 1 and 8 in their town, while the 1986 movie Crossroads was filmed in Beulah, Mississippi. The blues historian Steve Cheseborough wrote that it may be impossible to discover the exact location of the mythical crossroads, because "Robert Johnson was a rambling guy".

=== Interpretations ===
Some scholars have argued that the devil in these songs may refer not only to the Christian figure of Satan but also to the trickster god of African origin, Legba, himself associated with crossroads. Folklorist Harry M. Hyatt wrote that, during his research in the South from 1935 to 1939, when African-Americans born in the 19th or early 20th century said they or anyone else had "sold their soul to the devil at the crossroads", they had a different meaning in mind. Hyatt claimed there was evidence indicating African religious retentions surrounding Legba and the making of a "deal" (not selling the soul in the same sense as in the Faustian tradition cited by Graves) with the so-called devil at the crossroads.

The Blues and the Blues singer has really special powers over women, especially. It is said that the Blues singer could possess women and have any woman they wanted. And so when Robert Johnson came back, having left his community as an apparently mediocre musician, with a clear genius in his guitar style and lyrics, people said he must have sold his soul to the devil. And that fits in with this old African association with the crossroads where you find wisdom: you go down to the crossroads to learn, and in his case to learn in a Faustian pact, with the devil. You sell your soul to become the greatest musician in history.

This view that the devil in Johnson's songs is derived from an African deity was disputed by the blues scholar David Evans in an essay published in 1999, "Demythologizing the Blues":

There are ... several serious problems with this crossroads myth. The devil imagery found in the blues is thoroughly familiar from western folklore, and nowhere do blues singers ever mention Legba or any other African deity in their songs or other lore. The actual African music connected with cults of Legba and similar trickster deities sounds nothing like the blues, but rather features polyrhythmic percussion and choral call-and-response singing.

The musicologist Alan Lomax dismissed the myth, stating, "In fact, every blues fiddler, banjo picker, harp blower, piano strummer and guitar framer was, in the opinion of both himself and his peers, a child of the Devil, a consequence of the black view of the European dance embrace as sinful in the extreme".

Both Lomax's and Evans's accounts themselves have been disputed and dismissed by Black scholars and authors including Amiri Baraka and Cornel West. West defines Blues as a creation of a people "who are willing to look unflinchingly at catastrophic conditions", as children of God responding to those conditions. Baraka argues that the call-and-response singing Lomax argues is different from Blues has been widely cited as being a central aspect of Blues music.

== Musical style ==
Johnson is considered a master of the blues, particularly of the Delta blues style. Keith Richards, of the Rolling Stones, said in 1990, "You want to know how good the blues can get? Well, this is it". But according to Elijah Wald, in his book Escaping the Delta, Johnson in his own time was most respected for his ability to play in a wide range of styles, from raw country slide guitar to jazz and pop licks, and for his ability to pick up guitar parts almost instantly upon hearing a song. His first recorded song, "Kind Hearted Woman Blues", in contrast to the prevailing Delta style of the time, more resembled the style of Chicago or St. Louis, with "a full-fledged, abundantly varied musical arrangement". The song was part of a cycle of spin-offs and response songs that began with Leroy Carr's "Mean Mistreater Mama" (1934). According to Wald, it was "the most musically complex in the cycle" and stood apart from most rural blues as a thoroughly composed lyric, rather than an arbitrary collection of more or less unrelated verses. Unusual for a Delta player of the time, a recording exhibits what Johnson could do entirely outside of a blues style. "They're Red Hot", from his first recording session, shows that he was also comfortable with an "uptown" swing or ragtime sound similar to that of the Harlem Hamfats, but as Wald remarked, "no record company was heading to Mississippi in search of a down-home Ink Spots ... [H]e could undoubtedly have come up with a lot more songs in this style if the producers had wanted them."

To the uninitiated, Johnson's recordings may sound like just another dusty Delta blues musician wailing away. But a careful listen reveals that Johnson was a revisionist in his time ... Johnson's tortured soul vocals and anxiety-ridden guitar playing aren't found in the cotton-field blues of his contemporaries.

— Marc Myers

=== Voice ===
An important aspect of Johnson's singing was his use of blue notes. These subtle inflections of pitch help explain why his singing conveys such powerful emotion. Eric Clapton described Johnson's music as "the most powerful cry that I think you can find in the human voice". In two takes of "Me and the Devil Blues", he shows a high degree of precision in the complex vocal delivery of the last verse: "The range of tone he can pack into a few lines is astonishing." The song's "hip humor and sophistication" are often overlooked. "[G]enerations of blues writers in search of wild Delta primitivism", wrote Wald, have been inclined to overlook or undervalue aspects that show Johnson as a polished professional performer.

Johnson is also known for using the guitar as "the other vocalist in the song", a technique later perfected by B.B. King and his personified guitar named Lucille: "In Africa and in Afro-American tradition, there is the tradition of the talking instrument, beginning with the drums ... the one-strand and then the six-strings with bottleneck-style performance; it becomes a competing voice ... or a complementary voice ... in the performance".

When Johnson started singing, he seemed like a guy who could have sprung from the head of Zeus in full armor. I immediately differentiated between him and anyone else I had ever heard. The songs weren't customary blues songs. They were so utterly fluid. At first they went by quick, too quick to even get. They jumped all over the place in range and subject matter, short punchy verses that resulted in some panoramic story-fires of mankind blasting off the surface of this spinning piece of plastic.

— Bob Dylan

=== Instrument ===
Johnson mastered the guitar, being considered today one of the all-time greats on the instrument. His approach was complex and musically advanced. When Keith Richards was first introduced to Johnson's music by his bandmate Brian Jones, he asked, "Who is the other guy playing with him?", not realizing it was Johnson playing one guitar. "I was hearing two guitars, and it took a long time to actually realise he was doing it all by himself", said Richards, who later stated that "Robert Johnson was like an orchestra all by himself". "As for his guitar technique, it's politely reedy but ambitiously eclectic—moving effortlessly from hen-picking and bottleneck slides to a full deck of chucka-chucka rhythm figures".

=== Lyrics ===
In The Story with Dick Gordon, Bill Ferris, of American Public Media, said, "Robert Johnson I think of in the same way I think of the British Romantic poets, Keats and Shelley, who burned out early, who were geniuses at wordsmithing poetry ... The Blues, if anything, are deeply sexual. You know, 'my car doesn't run, I'm gonna check my oil ... 'if you don't like my apples, don't shake my tree'. Every verse has sexuality associated with it".

== Influences ==
Johnson fused approaches specific to Delta blues to those from the broader music world. The slide guitar work on "Ramblin' on My Mind" is pure Delta and Johnson's vocal there has "a touch of ... Son House rawness", but the train imitation on the bridge is not at all typical of Delta blues—it is more like something out of minstrel show music or vaudeville. Johnson did record versions of "Preaching the Blues" and "Walking Blues" in the older bluesman's vocal and guitar style (House's chronology has been questioned by Guralnick). As with the first take of "Come On in My Kitchen", the influence of Skip James is evident in James's "Devil Got My Woman", but the lyrics rise to the level of first-rate poetry, and Johnson sings with a strained voice found nowhere else in his recorded output.

The sad, romantic "Love in Vain" successfully blends several of Johnson's disparate influences. The form, including the wordless last verse, follows Leroy Carr's last hit "When the Sun Goes Down"; the words of the last sung verse come directly from a song Blind Lemon Jefferson recorded in 1926. Johnson's last recording, "Milkcow's Calf Blues" is his most direct tribute to Kokomo Arnold, who wrote "Milkcow Blues" and influenced Johnson's vocal style.

"From Four Until Late" shows Johnson's mastery of a blues style not usually associated with the Delta. He croons the lyrics in a manner reminiscent of Lonnie Johnson, and his guitar style is more that of a ragtime-influenced player like Blind Blake. Lonnie Johnson's influence is even clearer in two other departures from the usual Delta style: "Malted Milk" and "Drunken Hearted Man". Both copy the arrangement of Lonnie Johnson's "Life Saver Blues". The two takes of "Me and the Devil Blues" show the influence of Peetie Wheatstraw, calling into question the interpretation of this piece as "the spontaneous heart-cry of a demon-driven folk artist".

== Legacy ==
=== Early recognition and reviews ===
Famed producer John Hammond was an early advocate of Johnson's music. Using the pen-name Henry Johnson, he wrote his first article on Robert Johnson for the New Masses magazine in March 1937, around the time of the release of Johnson's first record. In it, he described Johnson as "the greatest Negro blues singer who has cropped up in recent years ... Johnson makes Leadbelly sound like an accomplished poseur." The following year, Hammond hoped to get Johnson to perform at a December 1938 From Spirituals to Swing concert in New York City, as he was unaware that Johnson had died in August. Instead, Hammond played two of his recordings, "Walkin' Blues" and "Preachin' Blues (Up Jumped the Devil)", for the audience and "praised Johnson lavishly from the stage". Music historian Ted Gioia noted "Here, if only through the medium of recordings, Hammond used his considerable influence at this historic event to advocate a position of preeminence for the late Delta bluesman". Music educator James Perone also saw that the event "underscored Robert Johnson's specific importance as a recording artist". In 1939, Columbia issued a final single, pairing "Preachin' Blues" with "Love in Vain".

In 1940, nine of Johnson's songs were included on a "List of American Folk Songs on Commercial Records" prepared by musicologist Alan Lomax for a U.S. government conference. Lomax's notations for the entries range from "elaborate sex symbolism" ("Terraplane Blues"), "very nice love song" ("I'm a Steady Rollin' Man"), to "traces of voodoo" ("Stones in My Passway", "Hellhound on My Trail", "Cross Road Blues"). In 1942, commentary on Johnson's "Terraplane Blues" and "Last Fair Deal Gone Down" appeared in The Jazz Record Book, edited by Charles Edward Smith. The authors described Johnson's vocals as "imaginative" and "thrilling" and his guitar playing as "exciting as almost anything in the folk blues field". Music writer Rudi Blesh included a review of Johnson's "Hellhound on My Trail" in his 1946 book Shining Trumpets: a History of Jazz. He noted the "personal and creative way" Johnson approached the song's harmony. Jim Wilson, then a writer for the Detroit Free Press, also mentioned his unconventional use of harmony. In a 1949 review, he compared elements of John Lee Hooker's recent debut "Boogie Chillen": "His [Hooker's] dynamic rhythms and subtle nuances on the guitar and his startling disregard for familiar scale and harmony patterns show similarity to the work of Robert Johnson, who made many fine records in this vein".

Samuel Charters drew further attention to Johnson in a five-page section in his 1959 book, The Country Blues. He focused on the two Johnson recordings that referred to images of the devil or hell – "Hellhound on My Trail" and "Me and the Devil Blues" – to suggest that Johnson was a deeply troubled individual. Charters also included Johnson's "Preachin' Blues" on the album published alongside his book. Columbia Records issued the first album of Johnson's recordings, King of the Delta Blues Singers two years later.

=== Musicianship ===
Johnson is mentioned as one of the Delta artists who was a strong influence on blues singers in post-war styles. However, it is Johnson's guitar technique that is often identified as his greatest contribution. Blues historian Edward Komara wrote:

The execution of a driving bass beat on a plectrum instrument like the guitar (instead of the piano) is Johnson's most influential accomplishment ... This is the aspect of his music that most changed the Delta blues practice and is most retained in the blues guitar tradition.

This technique has been called a "boogie bass pattern" or "boogie shuffle" and is described as a "fifth–sixth [degrees of a major scale] oscillation above the root chord". Sometimes, it has been attributed to Johnnie Temple, because he was the first to record a song in 1935 using it. However, Temple confirmed that he had learned the technique from Johnson: "He was the first one I ever heard use it ... It was similar to a piano boogie bass [which] I learned from R. L. [Johnson] in '32 or '33". Johnny Shines added: "Some of the things that Robert did with the guitar affected the way everybody played. In the early thirties, boogie was rare on the guitar, something to be heard". Conforth and Wardlow call it "one of the most important riffs in blues music" and music historian Peter Guralnick believes Johnson "popularized a mode [walking bass style on guitar] which would rapidly become the accepted pattern". Although author Elijah Wald recognizes Johnson's contribution in popularizing the innovation, he discounts its importance and adds, "As far as the evolution of black music goes, Robert Johnson was an extremely minor figure, and very little that happened in the decades following his death would have been affected if he had never played a note".

=== Contemporaries ===
Johnson's contemporaries, including Johnny Shines, Johnnie Temple, Henry Townsend, Robert Lockwood Jr., Calvin Frazier, and David "Honeyboy" Edwards were among those who kept his music alive through performing his songs and using his guitar techniques. Fellow Mississippi native Elmore James is the best known and is responsible for popularizing Johnson's "Dust My Broom". In 1951, he recast the song as a Chicago-style blues, with electric slide guitar and a backing band. According to blues historian Gerard Herhaft:

Johnson's influence upon Elmore James's music always remained powerful: his falsetto voice, almost shrill, and the intensive use of the "walking" bass notes of the boogie-woogie, several pieces of James' repertoire were borrowed from Johnson (e.g, "Dust My Broom", "Rambling on My Mind", and "Crossroads").

James' version is identified as "one of the first recorded examples of what was to become the classic Chicago shuffle beat". The style often associated with Chicago blues was used extensively by Jimmy Reed beginning with his first record "High and Lonesome" in 1953. Sometimes called "the trademark Reed shuffle" (although also associated his second guitarist, Eddie Taylor), it is the figure Johnson used updated for electric guitar.

=== Blues standards ===
Several of Johnson's songs became blues standards, which is used to describe blues songs that have been widely performed and recorded over a period of time and are seen as having a lasting quality. Perone notes "That such a relatively high percentage of the songs attributed to him became blues standards also keeps the legacy of Robert Johnson alive". Those most often identified are "Sweet Home Chicago" and "Dust My Broom", but also include "Crossroads" and "Stop Breaking Down". As with many blues songs, there are melodic and lyrical precedents. While "Sweet Home Chicago" borrows from Kokomo Arnold's 1933 "Old Original Kokomo Blues", "Johnson's lyrics made the song a natural for Chicago bluesmen, and it's his version that survived in the repertoires of performers like Magic Sam, Robert Lockwood, and Junior Parker".

In the first decades after Johnsons' death, these songs, with some variations in the titles and lyrics, were recorded by Tommy McClennan (1939), Walter Davis (1941), Sonny Boy Williamson I (1945), Arthur Crudup (1949), Texas Alexander (1950), Elmore James (1951–1959), Baby Boy Warren (1954), Roosevelt Sykes (1955), Junior Parker (1958), and Forest City Joe (1959). Pearson and McCulloch believe that "Sweet Home Chicago" and "Dust My Broom" in particular connect Johnson to "the rightful inheritors of his musical ideas—big-city African American artists whose high-powered, electrically amplified blues remain solidly in touch with Johnson's musical legacy" at the time of Columbia's first release of a full album of his songs in 1961.

In Jim O'Neal's statement when Johnson was inducted into the Blues Foundation Blues Hall of Fame, he identified "Hell Hound on My Trail", "Sweet Home Chicago", "Dust My Broom", "Love in Vain", and "Crossroads" as Johnson's classic recordings. Over the years, these songs have been individually inducted into the Blues Hall's "Classic of Blues Recording – Single or Album Track" category, as well as "Come On in My Kitchen" and "Terraplane Blues".

=== Rock music ===
In the mid-1950s, rock and roll pioneer Chuck Berry adapted the boogie pattern on guitar for his songs "Roll Over Beethoven" and "Johnny B. Goode". Author Dave Rubin commented:

his [Berry's] utilization of the bass-string cut-boogie patterns popularized by Robert Johnson on songs like "Sweet Home Chicago" ... subtly altered the swing feel of the boogie blues into a more driving, straight 4/4 meter while still maintaining a limber lilt that is often missing in the countless imitations that followed.

The pattern "became one of the signature figures in early electric guitar-based rock and roll, such as that of Chuck Berry and the numerous rock musicians of the 1960s who were influenced by Berry", according to Perone. Although music historian Larry Birnbaum also sees the connection, he wrote that Johnson's "contributions to the origins of rock 'n' roll are negligible". The Rock and Roll Hall of Fame inducted Johnson as an early influence in its first induction ceremony, in 1986, almost a half century after his death. It also included four of his songs it deemed to have shaped the genre: "Sweet Home Chicago", "Cross Road Blues", "Hellhound on My Trail", and "Love in Vain". Marc Meyers, of the Wall Street Journal, commented, "His 'Stop Breakin' Down Blues' from 1937 is so far ahead of its time that the song could easily have been a rock demo cut in 1954".

Several rock artists describe Johnson as an influence:

- Eric Clapton – "Robert Johnson to me is the most important blues musician who ever lived". He recorded several of Johnson's songs as well as an entire tribute album, Me and Mr. Johnson (2004). Clapton feels that rather than trying to recreate Johnson's originals, "I was trying to extract as much emotional content from it as I could, while respecting the form at the same time".
- Bob Dylan – "In about 1964 and '65, I probably used about five or six of Robert Johnson's blues song forms, too, unconsciously, but more on the lyrical imagery side of things. If I hadn't heard the Robert Johnson record when I did, there probably would have been hundreds of lines of mine that would have been shut down—that I wouldn't have felt free enough or upraised enough to write. [His] code of language was like nothing I'd heard before or since".
- Robert Plant – "A lot of English musicians were very fired up by Robert Johnson [to] whom we all owe more or less our existence, I guess, in some way". Led Zeppelin recorded "Traveling Riverside Blues" and quoted some of Johnson's lyrics in "The Lemon Song".
- Keith Richards – "I've never heard anybody before or since use the [blues] form and bend it so much to make it work for himself ... he came out with such compelling themes [and] just the way they were treated, apart from the music and the performance, [was appealing]." The Rolling Stones recorded "Love in Vain" and "Stop Breaking Down".
- Johnny Winter – "Robert Johnson knocked me out—he was a genius. [He and Son House] both were big influences on my acoustic slide playing." He recorded "Dust My Broom" with additional guitar by Derek Trucks.

== Problems of biography ==
The thing about Robert Johnson was that he only existed on his records. He was pure legend.

— Martin Scorsese, Love in Vain: A Vision of Robert Johnson

Until the 2019 publication of Bruce Conforth and Gayle Dean Wardlow's biography, Up Jumped the Devil: The Real Life of Robert Johnson, little of Johnson's early life was known. Two marriage licenses for Johnson have been located in county records offices. The ages given in these certificates point to different birth dates, but Conforth and Wardlow suggest that Johnson lied about his age in order to obtain a marriage license. Carrie Thompson claimed that her mother, who was also Robert's mother, remembered his birth date as May 8, 1911. He was not listed among his mother's children in the 1910 census giving further credence to a 1911 birthdate. Although the 1920 census gives his age as 7, suggesting he was born in 1912 or 1913, the entry showing his attendance at Indian Creek School, in Tunica, Mississippi listed him as being 14 years old.

Five significant dates from his career are documented: Monday, Thursday and Friday, November 23, 26 and 27, 1936, at a recording session in San Antonio, Texas; and Saturday and Sunday, June 19 and 20, 1937, at a recording session in Dallas. His death certificate, discovered in 1968, lists the date and location of his death.

Record collectors admired Johnson's records from the time of their first release, and efforts were made to discover information about him, with virtually no success. A relatively full account of Johnson's brief musical career emerged in the 1960s, largely from accounts by Son House, Johnny Shines, David "Honeyboy" Edwards and Robert Jr. Lockwood. In 1961, the sleeve notes to the album King of the Delta Blues Singers included reminiscences by Don Law who had recorded Johnson in 1936. Law added to the mystique surrounding Johnson, representing him as very young and extraordinarily shy.

The blues researcher Mack McCormick began researching Johnson's family background in 1972, but died in 2015 without publishing his findings. McCormick's research eventually became as much a legend as Johnson himself. In 1982, McCormick permitted Peter Guralnick to publish a summary in Living Blues (1982), later reprinted in book form as Searching for Robert Johnson. Later researchers sought to confirm this account or to add minor details. A revised summary acknowledging major contributors was written by Stephen LaVere for the booklet accompanying Robert Johnson, The Complete Recordings box set (1990). The documentary film The Search for Robert Johnson contains accounts by McCormick and Wardlow of what informants have told them: long interviews of David "Honeyboy" Edwards and Johnny Shines and short interviews of surviving friends and family. Another film, Can't You Hear the Wind Howl?: The Life & Music of Robert Johnson, combines documentary segments with recreated scenes featuring Keb' Mo' as Johnson with narration by Danny Glover. Shines, Edwards and Robert Jr. Lockwood contribute interviews. These published biographical sketches achieve coherent narratives, partly by ignoring reminiscences and hearsay accounts which contradict or conflict with their accounts.

=== Photographs ===
Until the 1980s, it was believed that no images of Johnson had survived. However, three images of Johnson were located in 1972 and 1973, in the possession of his half-sister Carrie Thompson. Two of these, known as the "dime-store photo" (December 1937 or January 1938) and the "studio portrait" (summer 1936), were copyrighted by Stephen LaVere (who had obtained them from the Thompson family) in 1986 and 1989, respectively, with an agreement to share any ensuing royalties 50% with the Johnson estate, at that time administered by Thompson. The "dime-store photo" was first published, almost in passing, in an issue of Rolling Stone magazine in 1986, and the studio portrait in a 1989 article by Stephen Calt and Gayle Dean Wardlow in 78 Quarterly. Both were subsequently featured prominently in the printed materials associated with the 1990 CBS box set of the "complete" Johnson recordings, as well as being widely republished since that time. Because Mississippi courts in 1998 determined that Robert Johnson's heir was Claud Johnson, a son born out of wedlock, the estate share of all monies paid to LaVere by CBS and others ended up going to Claud Johnson, and attempts by the heirs of Carrie Thompson to obtain a ruling that the photographs were her personal property and not part of the estate were dismissed. In his book Searching for Robert Johnson, Peter Guralnick stated that the blues archivist Mack McCormick showed him a photograph of Johnson with his nephew Louis, taken at the same time as the famous "pinstripe suit" photograph, showing Louis dressed in his United States Navy uniform; this picture, along with the "studio portrait", were both lent by Carrie Thompson to McCormick in 1972. McCormick never returned the photograph of Johnson in his uniform, keeping it in his archive until his death. McCormick's daughter donated the archive to the Smithsonian Institution in 2020 and encouraged museum staff to facilitate the return of the photograph to Johnson's descendants; as of 2023, The Washington Post reported that the museum had agreed to return the photograph and was awaiting instructions from the Johnson family. This photograph has never been made public.

Another photograph, purporting to show Johnson posing with the blues musician Johnny Shines, was published in the November 2008 issue of Vanity Fair magazine. Its authenticity was claimed by the forensic artist Lois Gibson and by Johnson's estate in 2013, but has been disputed by some music historians, including Elijah Wald, Bruce Conforth and Gayle Dean Wardlow, who considered that the clothing suggests a date after Johnson's death and that the photograph may have been reversed and retouched. Further, both "Honeyboy" Edwards and Robert Jr. Lockwood failed to identify either man in the photo. Facial recognition software concluded that neither man was Johnson or Shines. Finally, Gibson claimed the photo was from 1933 to 1934 but it is known that Johnson did not meet Shines until early 1937. In December 2015, a fourth photograph was published, purportedly showing Johnson, his wife Calletta Craft, Estella Coleman, and Robert Lockwood Jr. This photograph was also declared authentic by Lois Gibson, but her identification of Johnson has been dismissed by other facial recognition experts and blues historians. There are a number of reasons why the photograph is unlikely to be Johnson: it has been proven that Craft died before Johnson met Coleman, the clothing could not be prior to the late 1940s, the furniture is from the 1950s, the Coca-Cola bottle cannot be from prior to 1950, etc.

A fifth photograph of Johnson, this time smiling, was published in 2020. It is believed to have been taken in Memphis on the same occasion as the verified photograph of him with a guitar and cigarette (part of the "dime-store" set), and is in the possession of Annye Anderson, Johnson's step-sister (Anderson is the daughter of Charles Dodds, later Spencer, who was married to Robert's mother but was not his father). As a child, Anderson grew up in the same family as Johnson and has claimed to have been present, aged 10 or 11, on the occasion the photograph was taken. This photograph was published in Vanity Fair in May 2020, as the cover image for a book, Brother Robert: Growing Up with Robert Johnson, written by Anderson in collaboration with author Preston Lauterbach, and is considered to be authentic by Johnson scholar Elijah Wald.

=== Descendants ===
Johnson left no will. In 1998, the Mississippi Supreme Court ruled that Claud Johnson, a retired truck driver living in Crystal Springs, Mississippi, was the son of Robert Johnson and his only heir. The court heard that he had been born to Virgie Jane Smith (later Virgie Jane Cain), who had a relationship with Robert Johnson in 1931. The relationship was attested to by a friend, Eula Mae Williams, but other relatives descended from Robert Johnson's half-sister, Carrie Harris Thompson, contested Claud Johnson's claim. The effect of the judgment was to allow Claud Johnson to receive over $1 million in royalties. Claud Johnson died, aged 83, on June 30, 2015, leaving six children.

== Discography ==
Eleven 78-rpm records by Johnson were released by Vocalion Records in 1937 and 1938, with additional pressings by ARC budget labels. In 1939, a twelfth was issued posthumously. Johnson's estate holds the copyrights to his songs. In 1961, Columbia Records released King of the Delta Blues Singers, an album representing the first modern-era release of Johnson's performances, which started the "re-discovery" of Johnson as blues artist. In 1970, Columbia issued a second volume, King of the Delta Blues Singers, Vol. II.

The Complete Recordings, a two-disc set, released on August 28, 1990, contains almost everything Johnson recorded, with all 29 recordings, and 12 alternate takes. Another alternate take of "Traveling Riverside Blues" was released by Sony on the CD reissue of King of the Delta Blues Singers. To celebrate the 100th anniversary of Johnson's birth, May 8, 2011, Sony Legacy released Robert Johnson: The Centennial Collection, a re-mastered 2-CD set of all 42 of his recordings and two brief fragments, one of Johnson practicing a guitar figure and the other of Johnson saying, presumably to engineer Don Law, "I wanna go on with our next one myself". One reviewer commented that the sound quality of the 2011 release was a slight improvement on the 1990 release.

== Awards and recognition ==
- 1980 – Blues Hall of Fame: performer
- 1986 – Rock and Roll Hall of Fame: early influence
- 1990 – Spin magazine: first in its list of "35 Guitar Gods" on the 52nd anniversary of his death
- 1991 – Grammy Award: best historical album (The Complete Recordings)
- 1991 – Blues Music Award: reissue album (The Complete Recordings)
- 1994 – U.S. Postal Service: commemorative stamp
- 1995 – Rock and Roll Hall of Fame "500 Songs That Shaped Rock and Roll": "Sweet Home Chicago", "Cross Road Blues", "Hellhound on My Trail", "Love in Vain"
- 1998 – Grammy Hall of Fame: "Cross Road Blues"
- 2000 – Mississippi Musicians Hall of Fame: Blues pioneer
- 2003 – National Recording Registry: The Complete Recordings
- 2003 – Rolling Stone's David Fricke: fifth on his list of "100 Greatest Guitarists of All Time"
- 2006 – Grammy Lifetime Achievement Award: performer
- 2008 – Marker No. 29 on the Mississippi Blues Trail at his birthplace in Hazlehurst; also, at his presumed gravesite in Greenwood
- 2010 – Gibson.com: ninth on its list of "Top 50 Guitarists of All Time"
- 2014 – Grammy Hall of Fame: "Sweet Home Chicago"
- 2015 – Rolling Stone No. 71 on its list of the "100 Greatest Guitarists of All Time" (down from No. 5 on its 2003 list chosen by David Fricke)
- 2023 – Ranked number 124 on Rolling Stone′s list of the 200 Greatest Singers of All Time
- 2023 – Ranked number 16 on Rolling Stone's list of 250 greatest guitarists of all time

== In popular culture ==
He is considered the first member of the so-called "27 Club", which consists of musicians who have died at that age including Jimi Hendrix, Kurt Cobain, Janis Joplin, and Amy Winehouse.

Robert Johnson was played by La Monde Byrd in Supernatural season 2 episode 8, "Crossroad Blues".

In 1991, the Tony Joe White swamp blues song "Tunica Motel" describes hallucinating a ghostly vision of Robert Johnson walking across a field.

In 1994, Johnson was featured on a U.S. postage stamp.

In 2001, Elton John and Bernie Taupin name-checked Johnson in "The Wasteland", a track from their Songs From the West Coast album.

The Tim McGraw song "How Bad Do You Want It" off the 2004 album Live Like You Were Dying, opens with the lines "Robert Johnson went to the crossroads, so the legend goes/He left with his guitar, but the Devil took his soul, the Devil took his soul".

An episode of Metalocalypse portrays a parody of Robert Johnson, named Mashed Potato Johnson, exemplified by the legend of Robert allegedly selling his soul to the devil for fame.

In season 2 episode 6 of the NBC sci-fi time-travel series Timeless, "King of The Delta Blues", the protagonists travel back to San Antonio in 1936 when Robert Johnson (portrayed by Kamahl Naiqui) and Don Law (played by Gavin Stenhouse) were recording Johnson's first album in a hotel room. The episode incorporates a bit of Johnson's singing and playing.

Me and the Devil Blues, a Japanese manga series by Akira Hiramoto that takes its title from the 1938 song by Robert Johnson, chronicles a fictional version of Johnson's life, as a man called "RJ" who sells his soul to the devil for a talent for playing the blues.

The 2021 song "Speechless" by Nas includes the lyrics "I went back into my past and then I sped it up/Robert Johnson, Winehouse and Morrison found where heaven was..."

In 2024, an episode of the British TV crime drama McDonald & Dodds featured the murder of a blues enthusiast involved in seeking to identify the crossroads at which Robert Johnson had supposedly met the Devil. Entitled "Jinksy Sings the Blues", it was Episode 2 of Series 4 and was broadcast in the UK on July 28, 2024.

In 2025, the character Sammie "Preacher Boy" Moore in the movie Sinners was loosely based on Robert Johnson.

== See also ==
- Violin Sonata in G minor (Tartini)

== Bibliography ==
- "Race Blues". Billboard. Vol. 42, no. 57. October 20, 1945. ISSN 0006-2510.
- Anderson, Annye C. (2020). Brother Robert: Growing Up with Robert Johnson. Hachette Books. ISBN 978-0-306-84527-7 – via Googlebooks.
- Barrett, David; Garcia, John (2010). "Blues Standards". Improvising Blues Harmonica. Mel Bay. ISBN 978-1-61065-276-6.
- Birnbaum, Larry (2013). Before Elvis: The Prehistory of Rock 'n' Roll. Lanham, Massachusetts: Scarecrow Press. ISBN 978-0-8108-8629-2.
- Blesh, Rudi (1946). Shining Trumpets: A History of Jazz. New York: Alfred A. Knopf. Reprint: ISBN 978-9150035889.
- Charters, Samuel (1959). The Country Blues. Rinehart.
- Charters, Samuel (1973). Robert Johnson. Oak Publications. ISBN 0-8256-0059-6.
- Cheseborough, Steve (2009). Blues Traveling: The Holy Sites of Delta Blues. University Press of Mississippi. ISBN 978-1604733280.
- Conforth, Bruce; Wardlow, Gayle Dean (2019). Up Jumped the Devil: The Real Life of Robert Johnson. Chicago Review Press. ISBN 978-1-64160-094-1.
- Connell, David (September 2, 2006). "Retrospective Blues: Robert Johnson – An Open Letter to Eric Clapton". British Medical Journal. 333 (7566): 489. doi:10.1136/bmj.333.7566.489. PMC 1557967.
- Dylan, Bob (2004). Chronicles Volume One. New York: Simon & Schuster. ISBN 978-0-7432-7258-2.
- Edwards, David Honeyboy (1997). The World Don't Owe Me Nothing: The Life and Times of Delta Bluesman Honeyboy Edwards. Chicago Review Press. ISBN 1-55652-368-8.
- Evans, David (October 22, 1999). "Demythologizing the Blues". Institute for Studies in American Music Newsletter.
- Evans, David (2005). The NPR Curious Listener's Guide to Blues. New York: Perigee Books. ISBN 978-0399530722.
- Gagnon, Hervé (2021). Crossroads. La dernière chanson de Robert Johnson. Hugo et cie. ISBN 9782755690026.
- Gillett, Charlie (1972). The Sound of the City (2nd. Laurel printing 1973 ed.). New York: Dell Publishing. ISBN 9780440381556.
- Gioia, Ted (2008). Delta Blues (Norton Paperback 2009 ed.). New York: W. W. Norton. ISBN 978-0-393-33750-1.
- Graves, Tom (2008). Crossroads: The Life and Afterlife of Blues Legend Robert Johnson. DeMers Books. ISBN 978-0-9816002-1-5.
- Guralnick, Peter (1998). Searching for Robert Johnson (Paperback ed.). Plume. ISBN 978-0452279490.
- Hamilton, Marybeth (2007). In Search of the Blues: Black Voices, White Visions. Jonathan Cape. ISBN 978-0224060189.
- Herzhaft, Gerard (1992). "Blues Standards". Encyclopedia of the Blues. Fayetteville, Arkansas: University of Arkansas Press. ISBN 978-1-55728-252-1.
- Hyatt, Harry Middleton (1973). Hoodoo, Conjuration, Witchcraft, Rootwork: Beliefs Accepted by Many Negroes and White Persons, These Being Orally Recorded Among Blacks and Whites. Vol. 4. Hannibal, Missouri: Western.
- Komara, Edward (2007). The Road to Robert Johnson: The Genesis and Evolution of Blues in the Delta from the Late 1800s Through 1938. Milwaukee, Wisconsin: Hal Leonard. ISBN 978-0-634-00907-5.
- Koda, Cub (1996). "Robert Johnson". In Erlewine, Michael; Bogdanov, Vladimir; Woodstra, Chris; Koda, Cub (eds.). All Music Guide to the Blues. San Francisco: Miller Freeman Books. ISBN 0-87930-424-3.
- LaVere, Stephen (1990). The Complete Recordings (Box set booklet). New York: Columbia Records. OCLC 711060972. C2K 46222.
- LaVere, Stephen (2011). Robert Johnson: The Centennial Collection (Box set booklet). Robert Johnson. New York: Columbia Records. OCLC 1012032220. 88697-85907-2.
- Lomax, Alan (September 3, 1940). "List of American Folk Songs on Commercial Records". Report of the Committee of the Conference on Inter-American Relations. U.S. Department of State Division of Cultural Relations.
- Lomax, Alan (1993). The Land Where the Blues Began (Illustrated reprint ed.). Methuen Publishing. ISBN 978-0413678508.
- Marcus, Greil (2015). Mystery Train (Sixth Revised ed.). New York: Plume. ISBN 978-0-14-218158-4.
- Milward, John (2013). Crossroads: How the Blues Shaped Rock 'n' Roll (and Rock Saved the Blues). UPNE. ISBN 978-1-55553-744-9.
- Palmer, Robert (1981). Deep Blues. New York: Penguin Books. ISBN 0-14-006223-8.
- Pearson, Barry Lee; McCulloch, Bill (2003). Robert Johnson: Lost and Found. Champaign, Illinois: University of Illinois Press. ISBN 978-0-252-07528-5.
- Perone, James E. (2019). Listen to the Blues!: Exploring a Musical Genre. Santa Barbara, California: ABC-CLIO. ISBN 978-1-4408-6614-2.
- Romano, Will (2006). Big Boss Man: The Life and Music of Bluesman Jimmy Reed. San Francisco: Backbeat Books. ISBN 978-0-87930-878-0.
- Rubin, Dave (2015). Inside Rock Guitar: Four Decades of the Greatest Electric Rock Guitarists. Milwaukee, Wisconsin: Hal Leonard. ISBN 978-1-4950-5639-0.
- Schroeder, Patricia R. (2004). Robert Johnson, Mythmaking, and Contemporary American Culture. Champaign, Illinois: University of Illinois Press. ISBN 978-0-252-02915-8.
- Sullivan, Mary Lou (2010). Raisin' Cain: The Wild and Raucous Story of Johnny Winter. Milwaukee, Wisconsin: Backbeat Books. ISBN 978-0-87930-973-2.
- Townsend, Henry Townsend; Greensmith, Bill (1999). A Blues Life. Urbana, Illinois: University of Illinois Press. ISBN 978-0252025266.
- Wald, Elijah (2004). Escaping the Delta: Robert Johnson and the Invention of the Blues. New York: Amistad. ISBN 978-0-06-052427-2. LCCN 2003052287. OCLC 1034666573.
- Wardlow, Gayle Dean; Komara, Edward M. (1998). Chasin' that Devil Music: Searching for the Blues. San Francisco: Miller Freeman Books. ISBN 0-87930-552-5.
- Wilson, Jim (January 22, 1949). "Artists Get Workout in Bopping Old Tune". The Detroit Free Press. ISSN 1055-2758.
