= Gayle Dean Wardlow =

American historian of the blues (born 1940)

- Born: August 31, 1940 (age 84); Freer, Texas, U.S.
- Occupation: Historian

Gayle Dean Wardlow (born August 31, 1940) is an American historian of the blues. He is particularly associated with research into the lives of the musicians Charlie Patton and Robert Johnson and the historical development of the Delta blues, on which he is a leading authority.

He was born in Freer, Texas, but was brought up from the age of six in Meridian, Mississippi. In his teens, he began collecting Roy Acuff 78s. He originally began collecting blues records so as to exchange them for Acuff's. However, by about 1960, he had started collecting blues records for their own sake and realized that very little biographical information existed on the musicians who had created them.

By 1963, Wardlow had begun researching a book on Delta blues musicians, mainly by making enquiries in black neighborhoods, recording oral histories, anecdotes, songs, and remembrances. He interviewed Ishman Bracey, Charlie Patton's widow, and blues talent broker H. C. Speir, and a few years later, uncovered Robert Johnson's death certificate. Hayes McMullan's musical talents were unearthed following a chance encounter in 1967 between Wardlow and McMullan. Wardlow transcribed the songs and penned the sleevenotes for the 2017 CD release of McMullan's Everyday Seem Like Murder Here, issued over 30 years after McMullan's death. In the process of his overall research work, Wardlow became a leading authority on country blues. He also amassed the world’s largest and most valuable collection of pre-war blues records, many of which are now unique.

Wardlow has published many articles on blues history and the book Chasin' That Devil Music: Searching for the Blues, which was inducted into the Blues Hall of Fame in 2006 as a classic of blues literature.

In 2019, Wardlow co-authored, with Bruce Conforth, the Robert Johnson biography, Up Jumped the Devil: The Real Life of Robert Johnson, which has been called "the definitive Robert Johnson biography". The book won the 2020 Penderyn Prize for being the best music book of any type for 2019.

He has worked as an investigative and sports journalist, serving as sports information director at the University of West Alabama and the University of Alabama. He has also been a journalism professor at various universities.
