= Education segregation in the Mississippi Delta =

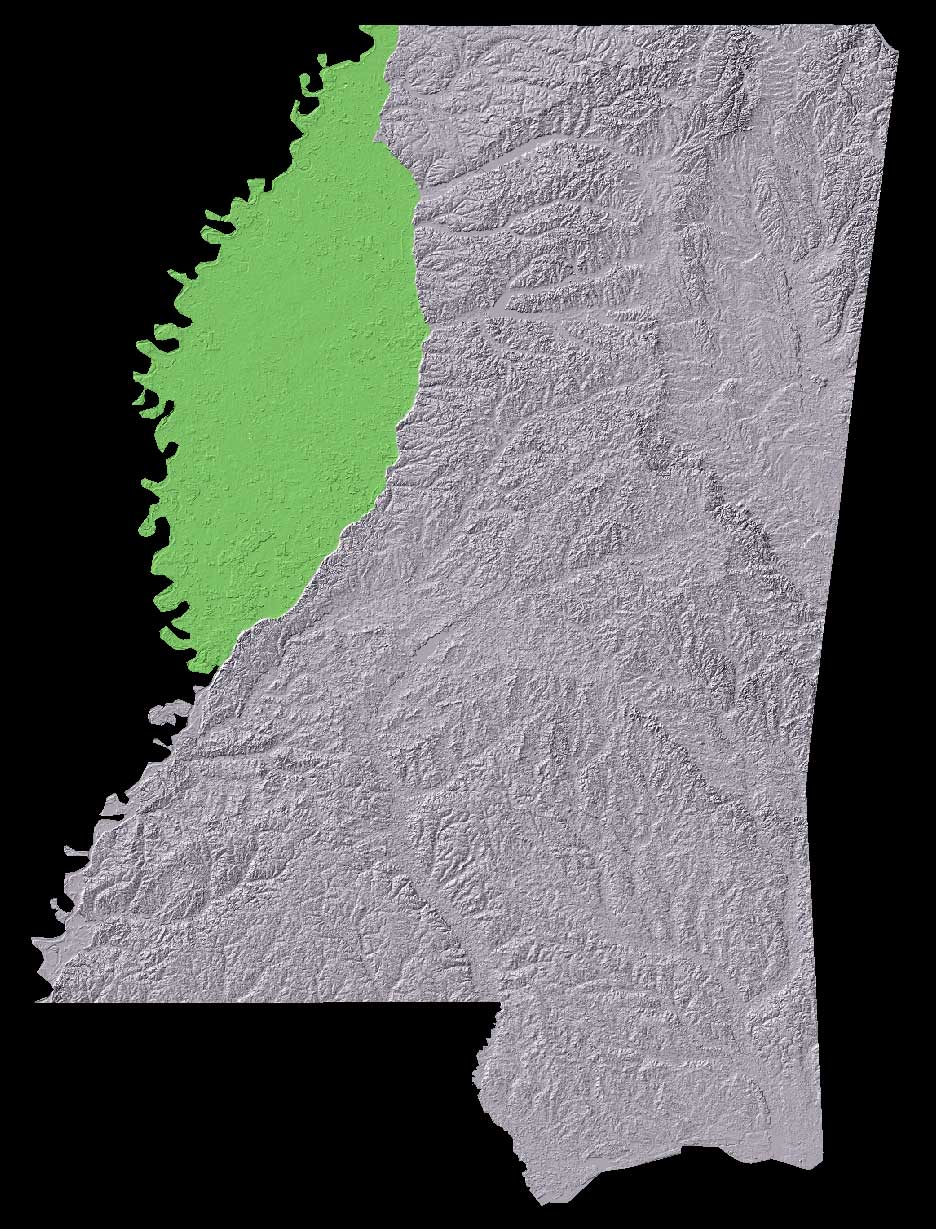
The Mississippi Delta region

The Mississippi Delta region has had the most segregated schools—and for the longest time—of any part of the United States. As recently as the 2016–2017 school year, East Side High School in Cleveland, Mississippi, was practically all black: 359 of 360 students were African-American.

== Background ==
The Delta region of Mississippi is nineteen counties in the northwest of the state, bounded on the west by the Mississippi River and the south by the Yazoo River. It is a poor region of the country's poorest state. In the center is Sunflower County, which serves as an example for the region. It is consistently 72% Black or African-American at every census. In 1960, the average income of African Americans in Sunflower County was lower than the federal poverty line. Farm mechanization in the first half of the twentieth century, among other things, had made employment prospects bad in the region. As a result, from 1940 to 1970, there was net outward migration to northern and western inner cities and suburbs and from 1970 to present, urban centers in the South outside of Mississippi. The population has been decreasing since 1930. In 1962, a colleague of civil rights worker Charles McLaurin said that Sunflower County was "the worst county in the worst state" for racial discrimination.

The towns in the region were small then and remain so today. Cleveland, Mississippi, population 12,000, has barely enough population to support one high school, much less the two that it supported from 1966 to 2017. Nevertheless, the Delta region has had the most dogged commitment to school segregation of any area of the country.

Brown v. Board of Education had established national education policy in 1954, but the less populated districts of the Delta were not compelled to act until the 1960s. Nevertheless, Robert B. Patterson of Sunflower County began to organize the Citizens' Councils that sponsored segregation academies in Mississippi. Cleveland established its freedom of choice plan and the Cleveland Colored Consolidated High School in 1966.

Before Brown, public education for African-Americans in the Delta was neither compulsory nor free. As a result, many did not attend. Sunflower County estimated that there were 20,473 African Americans between the ages of six through twenty-one; however, only 7,709 of them were enrolled in schools. Tradition played a part; many black children had been employed in agriculture, including the October–November cotton harvest season. Geography played a role: schools were not close enough to walk to and school boards did not always supply buses. And money, too played a role. In 1949–1950, Sunflower County spent the same amount on white education (28% of the population) as it did on the black (72%). Schools asked the parents of black children to pay assessments for heating the schoolhouse. When Gov. Hugh White visited Indianola in 1953, he stated that finding enough money to support the two separate school systems was the biggest financial problem of his administration. In the Delta, Brown was not just about black kids going to school with white kids; in many cases it was about going to school at all.

== Segregation after Brown ==
Sunflower County, Mississippi

Mississippi's first response to Brown was to do nothing and wait for court orders. The Virginia General Assembly, by contrast, implemented the Stanley Plan in 1956 and laws protecting segregation in 1958. Its first segregation academy was started in 1955, with a slew in 1959. In Mississippi, freedom of choice legislation wasn't promulgated until 1965. Mississippi's first segregation academies didn't start opening until 1959. By then Virginia's tuition grant program had been called illegal and tax-exempted status for segregated schools would soon follow.

In 1969, a federal court found Mississippi's tuition grants supporting private schools—segregation academies for the most part—illegal in Coffey v. State Educational Finance Commission.

Later in 1969, U.S. v. Indianola Municipal Separate School District described Mississippi's freedom of choice plan as "constitutionally defective". All over the Delta region, parents started private schools for white children. Population had been declining, so school boards were willing to give away facilities.

Sunflower County serves as an example. In 1930, it had a population of 66,000. It had built Inverness High School in 1922. By 1970, its population had shrunk to 37,047. In about 1968, the school district sold Inverness to Central Delta Academy. Along with the other two all-white private schools in the county, Indianola Academy and North Sunflower Academy, those three schools took enough white children from the Sunflower public schools to make an 80-20 mix. The private schools competed for teachers with the public schools. The Sunflower County School District was complying with the big federal rules, but making up its own small ones. Proms and dances were canceled altogether to prevent the remaining white students in the public schools from associating with the black students. However, one of the most damaging effects of this move was on the school board. After forty years of complaints, the state combined the Sunflower, Drew, and Indianola school districts, for example.

== Today ==
In the 2014–2015 school year, public Coahoma Agricultural High School in the north of the region enrolled 267 black students, 1 Hispanic, and no white students.

In Bolivar County, lawyers fought for fifty-one years to keep both Cleveland's two high schools open. Cleveland High School, originally a white school, was by 2015, half and half. By itself, it was a model of success. The town's other high school, East Side had 360 students in 2015, 359 of whom were black. The town had exhausted its legal options. In September 2017, it complied with federal court order and combined the high schools as Cleveland Central High School.

Three miles away, Bayou Academy, founded in 1964, is also a single color. Demographic data for Bayou Academy shows that of the 355 students who attended in the 2015–2016 school year, 4 were black (1%).

In Humphreys County to the north, Humphreys Academy had one black student in its 156 student enrollment (2015–2016).

== See also ==
- Education segregation in the Mississippi Red Clay region
