= WNLA =

WNLA may refer to:

- The Workshop for Non-Linear Architecture, an experimental art collective
- WNLA (AM), a radio station (1390 AM) licensed to serve Indianola, Mississippi, United States
- WNLA-FM, a radio station (95.3 FM) licensed to serve Drew, Mississippi
- WDTL, a radio station (105.5 FM) licensed to serve Indianola, Mississippi, which held the call sign WNLA-FM from 1979 to 2012
- Witwatersrand Native Labour Association
