= KJ Williams =

American basketball player (born 1999)

No. 0 – Boulazac Basket Dordogne
- Position: Center / power forward
- League: Betclic ÉLITE

Personal information
- Born: September 3, 1999 (age 27)
- Listed height: 6 ft 10 in (2.08 m)
- Listed weight: 245 lb (111 kg)

Career information
- High school: East Side (Cleveland, Mississippi); Cleveland Central (Cleveland, Mississippi)
- College: Murray State (2018–2022); LSU (2022–2023)
- NBA draft: 2023: undrafted
- Playing career: 2023–present

Career history
- 2023–2024: Oklahoma City Blue
- 2024–2025: Promitheas Patras
- 2025–present: Boulazac Basket Dordogne

Career highlights
- NBA G League champion (2024); OVC Player of the Year (2022); 3× First-team All-OVC (2020–2022)
- Stats at Basketball Reference

Kamarion "KJ" Williams (born September 3, 1999) is an American professional basketball player for Boulazac Basket Dordogne of the LNB Pro A. He played college basketball for the Murray State Racers and the LSU Tigers.

== High school career ==
Williams began his high school career at East Side High School in Cleveland, Mississippi. As a junior, he helped the Trojans finish 22–12 and advance to the 3A State Basketball Championship game. Following his junior season, Williams entered Cleveland Central High School after it was formed by the merger of East Side and Cleveland High School. As a senior, he posted a triple-double of 21 points, 12 rebounds and 10 blocks against Gentry High School and had a 27 point and 28 rebound game against West Tallahatchie High School. Williams averaged 21 points and 11 rebounds per game and helped the Wolves to a 22–9 record and a berth in the second round of the 5A State Basketball Playoffs. In February 2018, Williams committed to playing college basketball for Murray State, choosing the Racers over offers from Western Kentucky and Southeastern Louisiana.

== College career ==
As a freshman, Williams averaged 7.6 points and 4.7 rebounds per game. He set the Murray State single-season field goal percentage record during his freshman season, connecting on 69 percent of his field goal attempts. Following the season, he focused on improving his conditioning and adding to his mid-range game. Williams averaged 12.7 points and 7.3 rebounds per game as a sophomore, and was named to the First Team All-Ohio Valley Conference (OVC). As a junior, Williams averaged 15.6 points and 8.5 rebounds per game. He repeated as a First Team All-OVC selection. On November 9, 2021, Williams scored 32 points in a 109–77 win against Cumberland. On February 10, 2022, he scored a career-high 39 points in a 73–62 win against Tennessee State. Williams had 30 points on 12-for-19 shooting and five rebounds on February 24, in a 76–43 win over Belmont to claim the OVC regular season title.

At the close of the 2021–22 season, Williams was named first-team All-OVC for the third consecutive year, as well as OVC Player of the Year. As a senior, he averaged 18 points, 8.4 rebounds and 1.4 steals per game.

On March 24, 2022, Williams declared for the 2022 NBA draft while maintaining his college eligibility and entered the transfer portal. On May 5, 2022, he transferred to LSU for his final season of eligibility, following coach Matt McMahon from Murray State. Williams scored 16 points in a 77–56 loss to Tennessee on January 21, 2023, and passed the 2,000-point mark.

== Professional career ==
=== Oklahoma City Blue (2023–2024) ===
After going undrafted in the 2023 NBA draft, Williams joined the Oklahoma City Thunder for the 2023 NBA Summer League and on October 18, 2023, he signed with them. However, he was waived the next day and on October 31, he joined the Oklahoma City Blue.

=== Promitheas Patras (2024–2025) ===
On August 10, 2024, Williams signed with Promitheas Patras of the Greek Basket League.

=== Boulazac Basket Dordogne (2025–present) ===
On July 4, 2025, he signed with Boulazac Basket Dordogne of the LNB Pro A.

== Career statistics ==
Legend
GP	Games played	GS	Games started	MPG	Minutes per game
FG%	Field goal percentage	3P%	3-point field goal percentage	FT%	Free throw percentage
RPG	Rebounds per game	APG	Assists per game	SPG	Steals per game
BPG	Blocks per game	PPG	Points per game	**Bold**	Career high

=== College ===
Year	Team	GP	GS	MPG	FG%	3P%	FT%	RPG	APG	SPG	BPG	PPG
2018–19	Murray State	32	22	18.2	**.698**	.200	.526	4.7	.5	.6	.6	7.6
2019–20	Murray State	32	8	23.4	.544	.360	.670	7.3	**1.0**	1.1	.7	12.7
2020–21	Murray State	26	26	28.7	.567	**.413**	.667	**8.5**	**1.0**	1.0	.6	15.6
2021–22	Murray State	**34**	**34**	29.0	.538	.327	.699	8.4	.7	**1.4**	.6	**18.0**
2022–23	Louisiana State	33	33	**32.8**	.490	.411	**.785**	7.7	.9	1.2	**.8**	17.7
Career		157	123	26.4	.547	.376	.695	7.3	.8	1.1	.6	14.3

== Personal life ==
Williams is the son of Amie Williams, who played basketball at East Side High School, leading the team to the 1999 4A State Title game before playing collegiately at Jackson State, and LaMarcus Smith

== See also ==
- List of NCAA Division I men's basketball players with 2,000 points and 1,000 rebounds
