= WNIX =

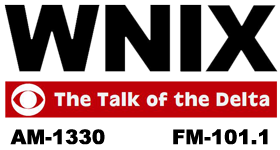
- Greenville, Mississippi; United States
- Broadcast area: Mississippi and Arkansas Delta
- Frequency: 1330 kHz
- Branding: WNIX

Programming
- Format: Talk radio
- Affiliations: Fox News Radio; Compass Media Networks; Salem Radio Network; Westwood One

Ownership
- Owner: Delta Radio Network LLC; (Delta Radio Network LLC, acquired 2010)
- Sister stations: WDTL, WIBT, WKXY, WKXG, WIQQ, WNLA, WNLA-FM, KZYQ, WZYQ, WBYB

History
- First air date: 1939
- Former call signs: WJPR (1939–1979)

Technical information
- Licensing authority: FCC
- Facility ID: 66328
- Class: D
- Power: 3,800 watts (day); 55 watts (night)
- Transmitter coordinates: 33°24′36.4″N 91°1′3.4″W
- Translator: 101.1 W266BY (Greenville)

Links
- Public license information: Public file; LMS
- Webcast: Listen live
- Website: wnixradio.com

WNIX (1330 AM) is a radio station broadcasting a talk format. Licensed to Greenville, Mississippi, United States, the station is currently owned by Delta Radio Network LLC. It is the oldest radio station in Greenville, MS, and the second oldest radio station in the Mississippi Delta.

In 2017, WNIX was granted approval to increase day power from 1,000 to 3,800 watts and decrease night power from 500 to 55 watts, making the station the most powerful AM facility in the Mississippi Delta. Both daytime and nighttime patterns are (1 tower) non-directional.

WNIX also broadcasts on FM translator W266BY, Greenville, MS.
