= WIBT =

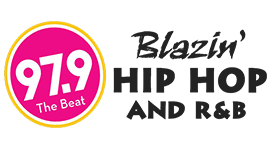
- Greenville, Mississippi; United States
- Broadcast area: Mississippi and Arkansas Delta
- Frequency: 97.9 MHz
- Branding: 97.9 The Beat

Programming
- Format: Urban contemporary
- Affiliations: Compass Media Networks; Premiere Networks

Ownership
- Owner: Delta Radio Network LLC
- Sister stations: WDTL, WIQQ, WKXY, WKXG, WNIX, WNLA, WNLA-FM, WZYQ, KZYQ, WBYB

History
- First air date: May 1, 1970 (as WBAQ)
- Former call signs: WBAQ (1970–2010); WLTM (2010–2016)
- Call sign meaning: W I BeaT

Technical information
- Licensing authority: FCC
- Facility ID: 25229
- Class: C2
- ERP: 48,000 watts horizontal polarization only
- HAAT: 153 meters (502 ft)
- Transmitter coordinates: 33°23′51″N 91°0′35″W

Links
- Public license information: Public file; LMS
- Webcast: Listen Live
- Website: 979thebeat.fm

WIBT (97.9 FM) is a radio station licensed to Greenville, Mississippi, United States. The station is owned by Delta Radio Network LLC and programs an urban contemporary format. The office and studios are located at 830 Main Street in downtown Greenville. WIBT moved from 104.7 to 97.9 on December 26, 2016.

== History ==
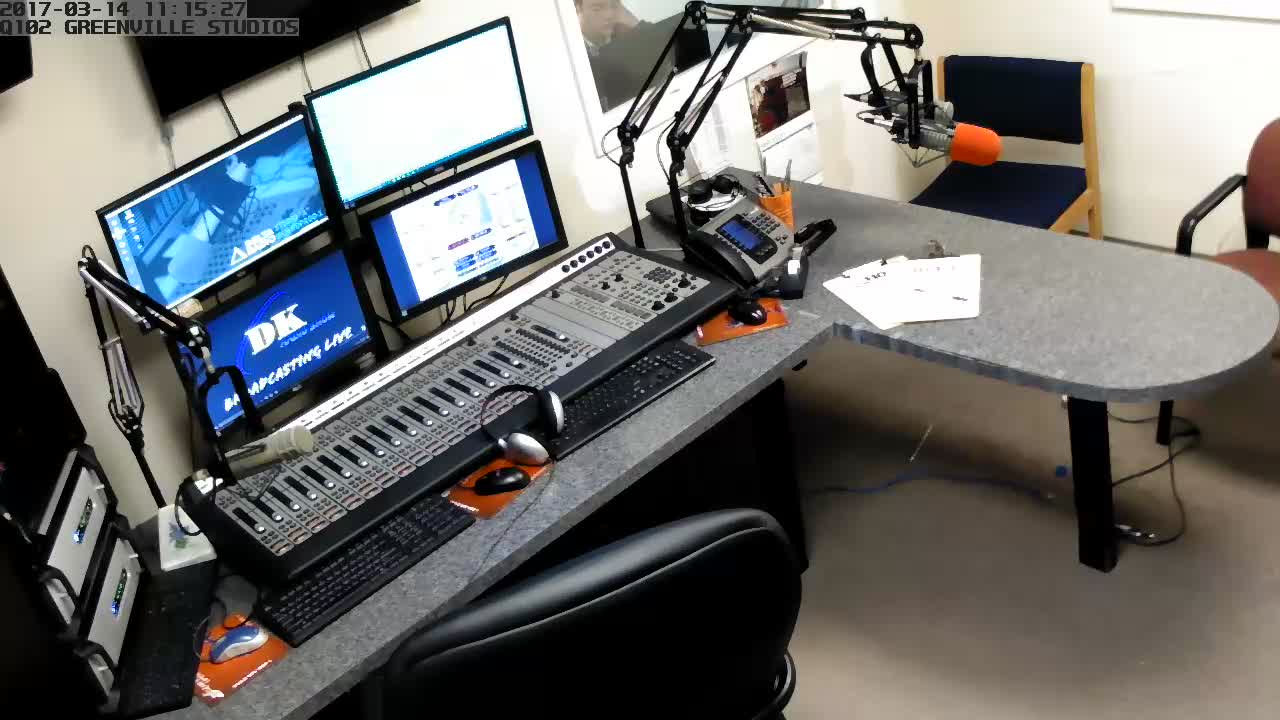
The studio for 97.9 The Beat as of March 2017.

WIBT signed on May 1, 1970 as WBAQ. The station was owned by Greenville Broadcasting Company (Paul Artman, Sr.) and programmed beautiful music. In 2007, the station was sold to Debut Broadcasting and the format was changed to adult contemporary. The station was purchased by Delta Radio Network LLC on April 1, 2010. The adult contemporary format was retained, but the call letters were changed to WLTM to better reflect the station's branding as "Lite 97.9". On December 26, 2016, WLTM officially changed to WIBT.
