= WNOU =

WNOU may refer to:

- WNOU (FM), a radio station (107.7 FM) licensed to serve Sasser, Georgia, United States
- WNLA-FM, a radio station (95.3 FM) licensed to serve Drew, Mississippi, United States, which held the call sign WNOU from 2016 to 2021
- WDTL, a radio station (105.5 FM) licensed to serve Indianola, Mississippi, which held the call sign WNOU from 2014 to 2016
- WIBC (FM), a radio station (93.5 FM) licensed to serve Indianapolis, Indiana, United States, which held the call sign WNOU from 2000 to 2007
