= WDSW-LP =

Low-power FM radio station at Delta State University in Cleveland, Mississippi

88.1 WDSW
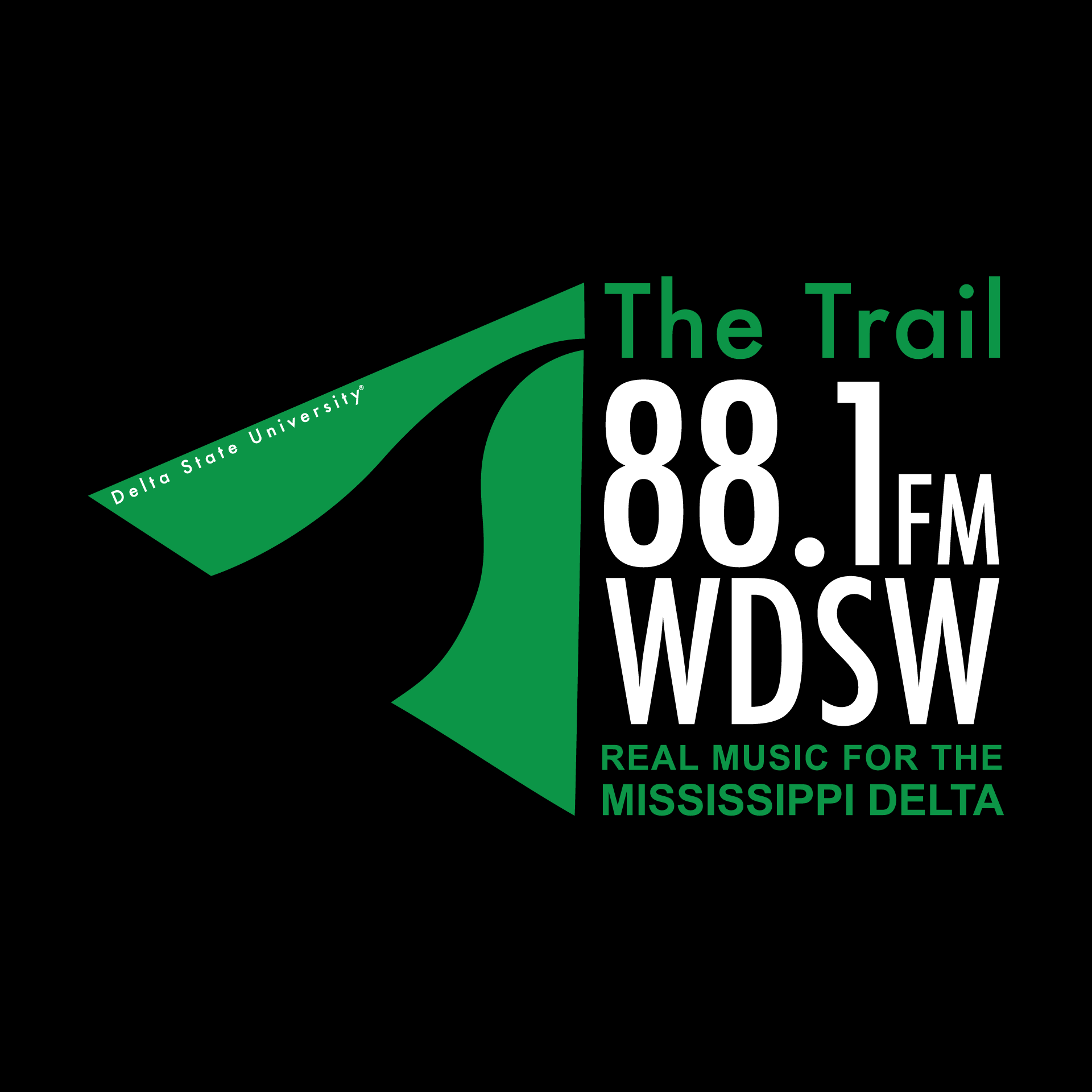
- Cleveland, Mississippi; United States
- Broadcast area: Cleveland, Mississippi; Renova, Mississippi; Boyle, Mississippi
- Frequency: 88.1 MHz
- Branding: 88.1 WDSW The Trail

Programming
- Format: Adult album alternative; pop; alternative rock; classic rock; Americana

Ownership
- Owner: Delta State University

History
- First air date: November 6, 2015
- Call sign meaning: Delta State Worldwide

Technical information
- Licensing authority: FCC
- Facility ID: 193426
- Class: L1
- ERP: 100 watts
- HAAT: 24.6 meters (81 ft)
- Transmitter coordinates: 33°44′40.40″N 90°44′8.30″W

Links
- Public license information: WDSW Public file; LMS
- Webcast: Listen live
- Website: www.deltastate.edu/wdsw/

WDSW-LP (88.1 FM) is a low-power radio station featuring an adult album alternative format. Licensed to Cleveland, Mississippi, WDSW-LP serves the Cleveland, Renova, and Boyle, Mississippi areas. WDSW-LP is owned and operated by Delta State University. It broadcasts from the Nowell Student Union Building on the third floor.

== History ==
WDSW-LP signed on as Delta State Radio in 2015 through a combination of donations, fundraising along with community and University support. The station's mission at the time was to serve the diversity of our communities by being an inclusive outlet for all the voices in the Delta.

Programming during these early years included a block format which catered to mostly pop, adult hits, some alternative with occasional live programming provided by student, university and community members along with Delta State President William LaForge. There was also a short period with a country format along with religious content.

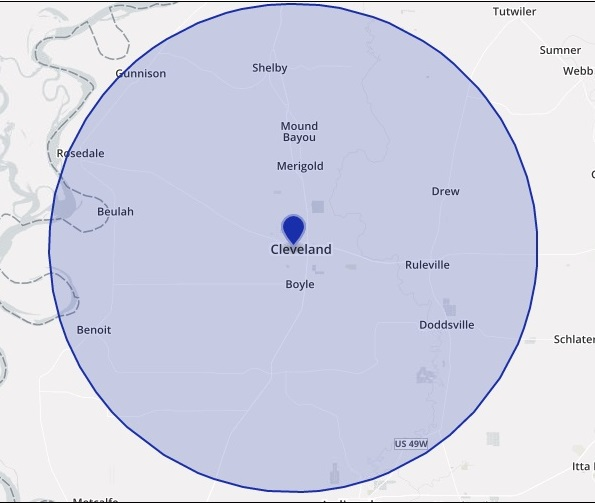
WDSW-LP's extended coverage area.

WDSW-LP's mission changed in 2019 with the vision to integrate the station into Delta State's academic mission, thus reframing WDSW-LP as a learning lab for students as part of a broadcast curriculum. WDSW-LP ceased the majority of block programming in December 2019 with the removal of the 10pm - 5am jazz block and instituted an adult album alternative/roots/blues/select Southern-leaning classic rock format 24/7 to provide Cleveland and the surrounding communities with a format that is unserved by other broadcasters in the Delta.

WDSW-LP shifted programming slightly starting in late March 2020 with the addition of Community Information Bulletins to relay hyper-local information to the surrounding communities about how the Delta was adapting to the COVID-19 Coronavirus.

On April 27, 2022, Delta State University was awarded a construction permit by the Federal Communications Commission to build a new 50,000 watt FM station on 89.5 FM.

== Coverage area ==
WDSW-LP can be heard reliably for a 8-10 mile radius around Delta State University. On good days, the station can be received as far north as Alligator (23 miles), Benoit (18 miles) to the southwest, Drew (12 miles) to the northeast and Doddsville (13 miles) to the southeast.

In communities such as Ruleville, Shaw and cities around the 10 mile mark distant from WDSW-LP, WDSW-LP suffers from attenuation from trees and buildings in addition to multipath due to WDSW-LP's single bay antenna being 80 feet (24 meters) HAAT. Tropospheric propagation when in active phases can reduce WDSW-LP's signal coverage to 3–5 miles.
