= Po' Monkey's =

Juke joint in Mississippi, United States

Coordinates: 33.83172°N 90.7584°W

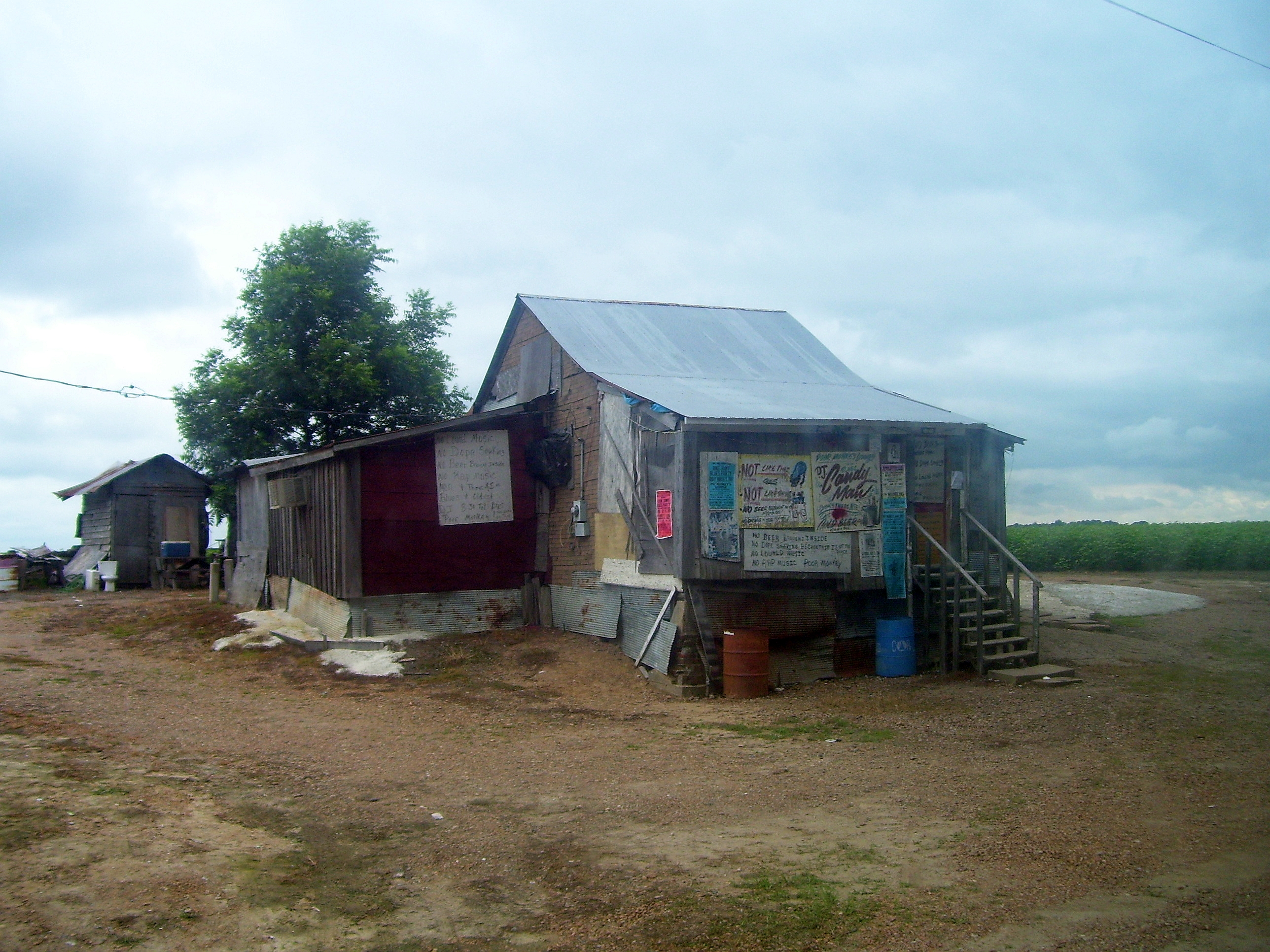

Po' Monkey's was a juke joint in unincorporated Bolivar County, Mississippi, United States, outside of Merigold. The juke joint was founded in the early 1960s and was one of the last rural juke joints in the Mississippi Delta. It ceased operating after the death of operator Willie "Po' Monkey" Seaberry in 2016.

The shack was originally sharecroppers' quarters. It is made of tin and plywood, held together by nails, staples, and wires, loosely fashioned and made by Seaberry. The low ceilings of the joint were lined with Christmas lights, naked babydolls, street signs, wrapping paper, disco balls, and dozens of stuffed-animal monkeys. The outside of the joint features a sign reading: "No Loud Music, No Dope Smoking, No Rap Music." Po' Monkey's was operated by Seaberry until his death in 2016. He also had a life estate in the property itself, meaning that he owned it during his lifetime. Upon his death, ownership of the property (but not the building's contents) reverted to the Hiter family.

Especially in its earlier years, Po' Monkey's was an incubator for the Delta Blues scene. In 1990, Birney Imes featured the club in his book, Juke Joint.

By the 1990s, it attracted a mix of people, from college students coming from Delta State University in Cleveland, Mississippi, to fans of Blues music and the atmosphere of juke joints. In 2000, famed photographer Annie Leibovitz photographed the juke joint. During this decade, it attracted a raunchier crowd filled with provocative dancing, strippers, and $2 cans of beer. Seaberry was best known for his colorful suits: he would often change suits several times a night, sometimes including humorous or sexually charged items with his suit.

In 2009, the Mississippi Blues Commission placed a historic marker at the Po Monkey's Lounge designating it as a site on the Mississippi Blues Trail for its contribution to the development of the blues (and being one of the few authentic juke joints then operating). In May 2014, it was featured in Season 3, Episode 24 of Anthony Bourdain: Parts Unknown. In 2015, Richard Grant vividly described a visit in his book, Dispatches from Pluto: Lost and Found in the Mississippi Delta and featured a photo of the juke joint on the cover.

Billy Nowell, the mayor of nearby Cleveland, Mississippi at the time of Seaberry's death, called Seaberry a "positive influence" on Bolivar County. Seaberry was found dead on July 14, 2016. Po' Monkey's ceased operating after Seaberry's death, and the contents of the building were sold at auction to Shonda Warner, a former resident of Clarksdale, Mississippi, who had frequented the joint.
