= Lou Rash =

American football player (born 1960)

No. 28, 34
- Position: Defensive back

Personal information
- Born: June 5, 1960 (age 66); Cleveland, Mississippi, U.S.
- Listed height: 5 ft 9 in (1.75 m)
- Listed weight: 180 lb (82 kg)

Career information
- High school: East Side (Cleveland, Mississippi)
- College: Mississippi Valley State (1979–1982)
- NFL draft: 1983: undrafted

Career history
- Pittsburgh Steelers (1983–1984)*; Philadelphia Eagles (1984); Saskatchewan Roughriders (1985)*; Toronto Argonauts (1987)*; Green Bay Packers (1987)
- * Offseason or practice squad member only

Career NFL statistics
- Games played: 7
- Stats at Pro Football Reference

Lou Rash (born June 5, 1960) is an American former professional football player who was a defensive back for two seasons in the National Football League (NFL) for the Philadelphia Eagles and Green Bay Packers. He played college football for the Mississippi Valley State Delta Devils. He was also a member of the Pittsburgh Steelers in the NFL and the Saskatchewan Roughriders and Toronto Argonauts in the Canadian Football League (CFL), although he did not appear in any games for those teams.

== Life and career ==
Rash was born on June 5, 1960, in Cleveland, Mississippi. He attended East Side High School in Mississippi and was the school's second alumnus to play in the NFL. At East Side, he played football as a strong safety and won four letters, being an all-conference selection and recording four interceptions with two punt return touchdowns as a senior. Rash married and had at least two children, including a son who played college football for the Akron Zips and a daughter who ran track at Slippery Rock. He signed to play college football for the Mississippi Valley State Delta Devils in December 1977 and played for Mississippi Valley State from 1979 to 1982. He was a cornerback for the Delta Devils and also served as their return specialist, being a starter for three seasons. As a senior, he was named the school's scholar-athlete of the year. He graduated with a degree in chemistry.

After going unselected in the 1983 NFL draft, Rash signed with the Pittsburgh Steelers as an undrafted free agent. In July, during training camp, he was mistakenly told that he had been released, and so he began to fly back home and reached Memphis, Tennessee. However, upon landing, he was messaged that the cut was a mistake, and he flew back to the Steelers camp. Rash missed the team's first two preseason games due to a sprained ankle, then pulled his hamstring upon returning for the third game. He was placed on the injured reserve list on August 16, 1983. Rash went on a weightlifting program for the 1984 season and added almost 20 pounds (9.1 kg). However, despite this, he saw little playing time in preseason and was released on August 28, 1984, as part of the final roster cuts. Steelers defensive coordinator Tony Dungy said that his release was based on the number of players the team had at the position and that he thought Rash was good enough to play in the NFL.

On October 15, 1984, Rash signed with the Philadelphia Eagles to the active roster to replace the injured Roynell Young. He made his NFL debut on October 21 in a Week 8 win over the New York Giants. He ended up appearing in four games for the Eagles on special teams, recording one tackle before being released on November 16. Rash signed with the Saskatchewan Roughriders of the CFL for the 1985 season, but was released on June 3, 1985. After a year out of football, he signed with the Toronto Argonauts in 1987 and although it was noted that he impressed at cornerback, he was released on June 18. Later that year, the NFL Players Association went on strike and teams assembled rosters of replacement players; Rash was signed by the Green Bay Packers as a replacement to play free safety on September 23, 1987. He appeared in all three strike games for the Packers, helping them win two of the three games, and was released after the strike on October 19. He finished his NFL career having appeared in seven games, three as a starter.
