= WNLA (AM) =

- Indianola, Mississippi; United States
- Broadcast area: Greenville
- Frequency: 1390 kHz
- Branding: FM 95.3 & AM 1390 WNLA

Programming
- Format: Gospel
- Affiliations: ABC News Radio

Ownership
- Owner: Delta Radio Network, LLC; (Delta Radio Network, LLC)
- Sister stations: KZYQ, WBYB, WDTL, WIBT, WIQQ, WKXY, WKXG, WNIX, WNLA-FM, WZYQ

History
- First air date: May 1953
- Former call signs: WNLA (1953–1959); WDLT (1959–1963)
- Former frequencies: 1380 kHz (1953–2020)
- Call sign meaning: "Indianola"

Technical information
- Licensing authority: FCC
- Facility ID: 59971
- Class: D
- Power: 1,000 watts (day); 44 watts (night)
- Transmitter coordinates: 33°28′41″N 90°38′28″W (day); 33°27′32″N 90°37′45″W (night)
- Repeater: 95.3 WNLA-FM (Drew)

Links
- Public license information: Public file; LMS
- Webcast: Listen live
- Website: wnlaradio.com

WNLA (1390 AM) is a radio station licensed to Indianola, Mississippi, United States. The station is owned by Delta Radio Network, LLC. WNLA broadcasts a Gospel music format to the greater Greenville, Mississippi, area.

On May 7, 2014, WNLA filed an application for a U.S. Federal Communications Commission (FCC) construction permit to change frequency to 1390 kHz, increase day power to 1,000 watts and decrease night power to 15 watts.

== History ==
In August 1984, Fritts Broadcasting, Inc., reached an agreement to sell this station to Shamrock Broadcasting, Inc. The deal was approved by the FCC on October 9, 1984, and the transaction was consummated on October 15, 1984.

In April 2007, Shamrock Broadcasting, Inc., contracted to sell this station and FM sister station WNLA-FM to Debut Broadcasting Corporation, Inc. The deal was approved by the FCC on May 22, 2007, and the transaction was completed on June 7, 2007. The stations were sold to Delta Radio Network in 2011.

Former logo
