= Education segregation in the Mississippi Red Clay region =

The Mississippi Red Clay region was a center of education segregation. Before the Brown v. Board of Education decision in 1954, Mississippi sponsored freedom of choice policies that effectively segregated schools. After Brown, the effort was private with some help from government. Government support has dwindled in every decade since. In the state capital, Jackson, some public schools were converted to white-only Council schools. Today, some all-white and mostly-white private schools remain throughout the region as a legacy of that period.

== Background ==
The Red Clay region of Mississippi is a slice of the state, the middle third in the northern three-fifths. It includes the state capital Jackson and the city of Meridian. The counties of the Red Clay region are majority white. In 1970, Hinds County was also majority white (it is not today). The region differs demographically from the Mississippi Delta regions to the west, where African Americans are the majority population in most counties.

Before Brown, public education for African-Americans in the Delta was neither compulsory nor free. As a result many did not attend. Sunflower County estimated that there were 20,473 African Americans between the ages of six through twenty-one; however, only 7,709 of them were enrolled in schools. Tradition played a part; many black children had been employed in agriculture, including the October–November cotton harvest season. Geography played a role: schools were not close enough to walk to and school boards did not always supply buses. And money, too played a role. In 1949-50, Sunflower County spent the same amount on white education (28% of the population) as it did on the black (72%). Schools asked the parents of black children to pay assessments for heating the schoolhouse. When Gov. Hugh White visited Indianola in 1953, he stated that finding enough money to support the two separate school systems was the biggest financial problem of his administration.

== Segregation after Brown ==
Brown v. Board of Education had established national education policy in 1954, but Mississippi mostly ignored the mandate. Before Brown, the state employed a policy of freedom of choice. Faced with lawsuits compelling integration in the 1960s, white parents organized segregation academies. Attendance at private schools in Mississippi increased from 5,000 to 40,000 between 1969 and 1971.

Mississippi's first response to Brown was to do nothing and wait for court orders. The Virginia General Assembly, by contrast, implemented the Stanley Plan in 1956 and laws protecting segregation in 1958. Its first segregation academy was started in 1955, with a slew in 1959. In Mississippi, "all deliberate speed" programs weren't promulgated until 1965. Mississippi's first segregation academies didn't start opening until 1967. By then, Virginia's tuition grant program had been called illegal and tax exempted status for segregated schools would soon follow.

In 1969, a federal court found Mississippi's tuition grants supporting private schools—segregation academies for the most part—illegal in Coffey v. State Educational Finance Commission.

Later in 1969, the Supreme Court in Alexander v. Holmes County Board of Education rejected Mississippi's policy of "all deliberate speed', ordering instead "districts be operated on a unitary basis". All over the Red Clay region, parents started private schools for white children.

== Council schools in Jackson ==
A 1968 advertisement for segregated private schools operated by the Citizens' Councils

Most segregation academies were local initiatives. In Jackson, Citizens' Councils organized a whole system of twelve schools, including:

- Council School No 1 Hartfield
- Council School No 2 McCluer later Council McCluer High School. Merged into Hillcrest Christian School in 1985.
- Council School No 3, later Council Manhattan High School, later Woodland Hills Academy
- Council School No 4 Plantation
- Council School No 5 Central Hinds
- Council School No 6 Magnolia
- Council School No 7 Hanging Moss

The Council was successful in getting support from the statehouse. Of forty-two segregation academies getting state tuition assistance, eight were in Jackson. Hodding Carter III described the Mississippi association as "the biggest, most tightly organized, the most powerful Citizens' Council of them all." White attendance in Jackson public schools dropped from 21,000 to less than 9,000.

Council schools provided instruction of white children by white teachers. The syllabus included Latin, the Lost Cause, business law, and data processing.

== Today ==
Public schools in Mississippi are integrated. The last federal lawsuit was settled in 2017. Private schools represented by Mississippi Association of Independent Schools operate largely outside the purview of the state education authorities. Only accredited non-public schools can get state aid including schoolbooks under the state's Blaine amendment; none of the independent schools are accredited.

In Jackson, the council schools are all gone. Nevertheless, private Jackson Academy in 2014–2015 was less than ten percent black, in a city that is now 69% African-American.

In Meridian, Lamar Academy is less than five percent black in a city that is 62% African American. The Meridian public schools remained troubled. In 2012, the city was named in U.S. v. City of Meridian a case that outlined failings in the public school system.

Further north in the Red Clay region, Calhoun Academy is 100% white.

== See also ==
- Education segregation in the Mississippi Delta

== Bibliography ==
- Curry, Constance (2002). The Intolerable Burden. Brooklyn, New York: First Run/Icarus Films.
- Curry, Constance (1995). Silver Rights. Chapel Hill: Algonquin of Chapel Hill.
- Moye, J. Todd (2004). Let the People Decide: Black Freedom and White Resistance Movements in Sunflower County, Mississippi, 1945–1986. Chapel Hill: University of North Carolina Press. ISBN 978-0-8078-5561-4.
- Myers-Asch, Christopher (2008). The Senator and the Sharecropper. New York: New Press. ISBN 978-1-59558-332-1.
