= Charlie Capps =

Charlie Capps may refer to:

- Charlie Capps (politician)
- Charlie Capps (rugby union)

== See also ==
- Charles Capps, American Christian preacher and teacher
