= WKXY =

- Merigold, Mississippi; United States
- Broadcast area: Cleveland, Mississippi
- Frequency: 92.1 MHz
- Branding: KIX 92.1

Programming
- Format: Country
- Affiliations: Fox News Radio

Ownership
- Owner: Delta Radio LLC
- Sister stations: WBYB; WIQQ; WIBT; WNIX; WNLA; WNLA-FM; WZYQ; KZYQ; WKXG; WDTL

History
- First air date: 2003
- Call sign meaning: "Kicks"

Technical information
- Licensing authority: FCC
- Facility ID: 77755
- Class: A
- ERP: 6,000 watts
- HAAT: 100 meters (330 ft)
- Transmitter coordinates: 33°52′49″N 90°42′24″W
- Translator: 103.1 W276EA (Cleveland)

Links
- Public license information: Public file; LMS
- Webcast: Listen live
- Website: kix921.com

WKXY (92.1 FM) is a radio station airing a country music format. The station is licensed to Merigold, Mississippi. WKXY is owned by Delta Radio Network LLC. The WKXY studio is located at 3965 Highway 61 North in Cleveland, Mississippi, and the transmitter site is located on East Mound Bayou Road, near the town of Mound Bayou, Mississippi.

== History ==
WKXY originally went on-air in Clarksdale, Mississippi, in 2003 and operated as a simulcast of WROX. The city of license was changed to Merigold in 2008 and the station was moved to and began serving the Cleveland area in October 2008.

== Programming ==
The station features a mainstream country format, including the KIX morning show with John "Maddog" Miller.
