= WIQQ =

- Leland, Mississippi; United States
- Broadcast area: Mississippi Delta
- Frequency: 102.1 MHz
- Branding: Q102

Programming
- Format: Top 40/CHR
- Affiliations: Premiere Networks; United Stations Radio Networks

Ownership
- Owner: Delta Radio Network LLC
- Sister stations: WDTL, WIBT, WKXY, WKXG, WNIX, WNLA, WNLA-FM, KZYQ, WZYQ, WBYB

History
- First air date: September 1, 1985
- Former frequencies: 102.3 MHz (1986–2019)

Technical information
- Licensing authority: FCC
- Facility ID: 66330
- Class: C3
- ERP: 14,000 watts
- HAAT: 134 meters (440 ft)
- Transmitter coordinates: 33°23′51″N 91°0′35″W

Links
- Public license information: Public file; LMS
- Webcast: Listen Live
- Website: q102.net

WIQQ (102.1 FM) is a radio station that broadcasts a Top 40/CHR music format. WIQQ is licensed to Leland, Mississippi, United States. Studios and offices are located at 830 Main Street in Greenville, Mississippi. The station is currently owned by Delta Radio Network LLC.

== History ==
WIQQ, known as "Q102", signed on August 31, 1985, and has been programming Top 40/Pop since its inception. The original owner, River Broadcasting Inc. (George Pine and Jimmy Karr) sold the station to Debut Broadcasting in 2007. Delta Radio Network LLC acquired the station on April 1, 2010.

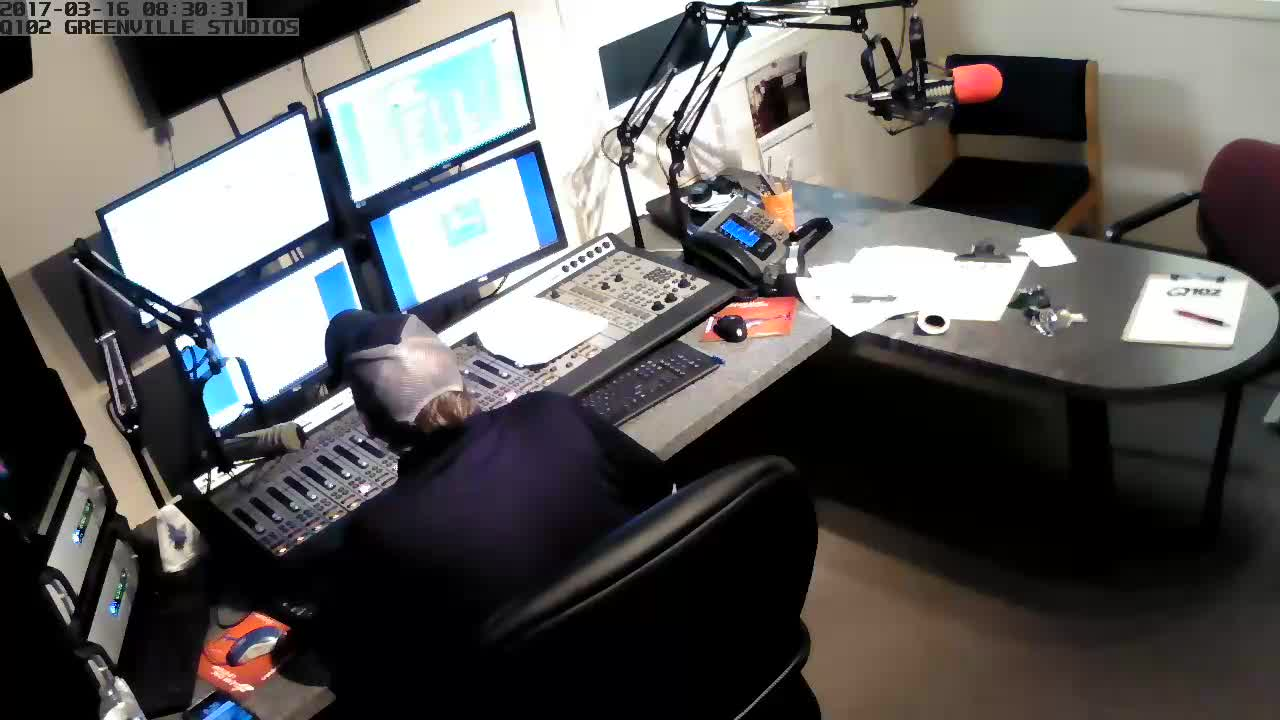
The studio for Q102, pictured on Thursday, March 16, 2017.
