= WKXG (FM) =

- Moorhead, Mississippi; United States
- Broadcast area: Greenwood, Mississippi
- Frequency: 92.7 MHz
- Branding: Kix 92.7

Programming
- Format: Country
- Affiliations: Fox News Radio; Compass Media Networks

Ownership
- Owner: Delta Radio Network; (Contemporary Communications LLC)
- Sister stations: KZYQ; WBYB; WDTL; WIBT; WIQQ; WKXY; WNIX; WNLA

History
- First air date: July 2017
- Former call signs: WMYQ (2016–2022)
- Call sign meaning: "Kix"

Technical information
- Licensing authority: FCC
- Facility ID: 198749
- Class: C3
- ERP: 8,500 watts
- HAAT: 87 meters (285 ft)
- Transmitter coordinates: 33°30′8″N 90°20′20″W

Links
- Public license information: Public file; LMS
- Webcast: Listen Live
- Website: www.deltaradio.net/stations/kix927

WKXG (92.7 MHz) is an FM radio station licensed to serve the community of Moorhead, Mississippi, and broadcasting to the Greenwood area. The station is owned by Delta Radio Network, through licensee Contemporary Communications LLC. It airs a country music format.

The station was assigned the WMYQ call letters by the Federal Communications Commission on August 17, 2016. It went on the air in July 2017, sharing the "Kix" branding with WKXY in Merigold but operating separately. At launch, WMYQ also featured the only radio news department in Leflore County, along with CBS News Radio.

In 2018, the station hired David Mueller, performing under the name Stonewall Jackson, who lost a civil lawsuit for sexual assault against Taylor Swift. The move was met with significant backlash from Swift fans.

The station changed its call sign to WKXG on November 14, 2022.
