= WDFX =

WDFX may refer to:

- WDFX-TV, a television station (channel 33, virtual 34) licensed to Dothan, Alabama, United States
- WBYB (FM), a radio station (98.3 FM) licensed to Cleveland, Mississippi, United States, which held the call sign WDFX from 1992 to 2017
