= Woodland Hills Academy =

Woodland Hills Academy may refer to

- Woodland Hills Academy (Pennsylvania)
- Woodland Hills Academy (Mississippi)
- Woodland Hills Academy, a middle school in Woodland Hills, Los Angeles, California
