= Markel Bell =

American football player (born 2004)

No. 72 – Philadelphia Eagles
- Position: Offensive tackle
- Roster status: Active

Personal information
- Born: July 19, 2004 (age 22); Cleveland, Mississippi, U.S.
- Listed height: 6 ft 9 in (2.06 m)
- Listed weight: 346 lb (157 kg)

Career information
- High school: Cleveland Central (Cleveland)
- College: Holmes (2022–2023); Miami (FL) (2024–2025)
- NFL draft: 2026: 3rd round, 68th overall pick

Career history
- Philadelphia Eagles (2026–present)

Career NFL statistics as of Week 10, 2026
- Games played: 9
- Games started: 6
- Fumble recoveries: 1
- Stats at Pro Football Reference

Markel Bell (born July 19, 2004) is an American professional football offensive tackle for the Philadelphia Eagles of the National Football League (NFL). He played college football for the Holmes Bulldogs and Miami Hurricanes and he was selected by the Eagles in the third round of the 2026 NFL draft.

== Early life ==
Bell was born on July 19, 2004 in Cleveland, Mississippi. He is the oldest of three siblings. Bell first began playing football during 7th grade. He attended Cleveland Central High School, where he played football and basketball. He later switched to football full time due to his size and on-field impact, growing to 6'7 and 285 pounds by his sophomore year. Despite his stature and ability, and the reception of offers from smaller, regional schools, Bell was drawn to Junior colleges rather than larger schools for developmental purposes, leading him to enroll at Holmes Community College in Goodman, Mississippi.

== College career ==
Bell played at Holmes Community College in 2022 and 2023. He earned All-NJCAA All-Region honors in 2023. Bell was ranked as the number one offensive tackle junior college transfer in 2023 and transferred to the University of Miami. In his first year at Miami in 2024, he played in 12 games and started five in place of injured starter Jalen Rivers. He returned to Miami in 2025 as the full-time starting left tackle. After the 2025 season, Bell was named a second-team Academic All-American and attended the Senior Bowl.

== Professional career ==
Pre-draft measurables
Height	Weight	Arm length	Hand span	Wingspan	40-yard dash	10-yard split	20-yard split
6 ft 9 1/4 in (2.06 m)	346 lb (157 kg)	36 3/8 in (0.92 m)	9 in (0.23 m)	7 ft 3 1/8 in (2.21 m)	5.36 s	1.84 s	3.11 s
All values from NFL Combine

Bell was selected by the Philadelphia Eagles with the 68th overall pick of the 2026 NFL draft. Philadelphia previously obtained the pick used to draft Bell by trading Haason Reddick to the New York Jets in 2024. On June 23, 2026, Bell officially signed his four-year rookie contract.
