= Floyd Womack =

American football player (born 1978)

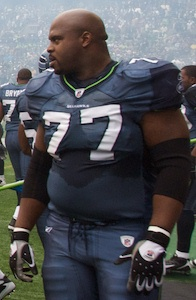
- Womack with the Seattle Seahawks in 2008

No. 77, 78
- Position: Guard

Personal information
- Born: November 15, 1978 (age 47); Cleveland, Mississippi, U.S.
- Listed height: 6 ft 4 in (1.93 m)
- Listed weight: 330 lb (150 kg)

Career information
- High school: East Side (Cleveland, Mississippi)
- College: Mississippi State (1997–2000)
- NFL draft: 2001: 4th round, 128th overall pick

Career history
- Seattle Seahawks (2001–2008); Cleveland Browns (2009–2010); Arizona Cardinals (2011)

Awards and highlights
- Second-team All-American (2000); First-team All-SEC (2000)

Career NFL statistics
- Games played: 120
- Games started: 71
- Fumble recoveries: 2
- Stats at Pro Football Reference

Floyd Seneca Womack (born November 15, 1978), nicknamed "Pork Chop", is an American former professional football player who was a guard in the National Football League (NFL). He was selected by the Seattle Seahawks in the fourth round of the 2001 NFL draft. He played college football for the Mississippi State Bulldogs.

== Career ==
Womack was selected by the Seattle Seahawks in the fourth round of the 2001 NFL draft. He also played for the Cleveland Browns. Womack played both right tackle and right guard in his career and saw time at both during the Browns' 2009 season.
