= Renova, Mississippi =

- Town
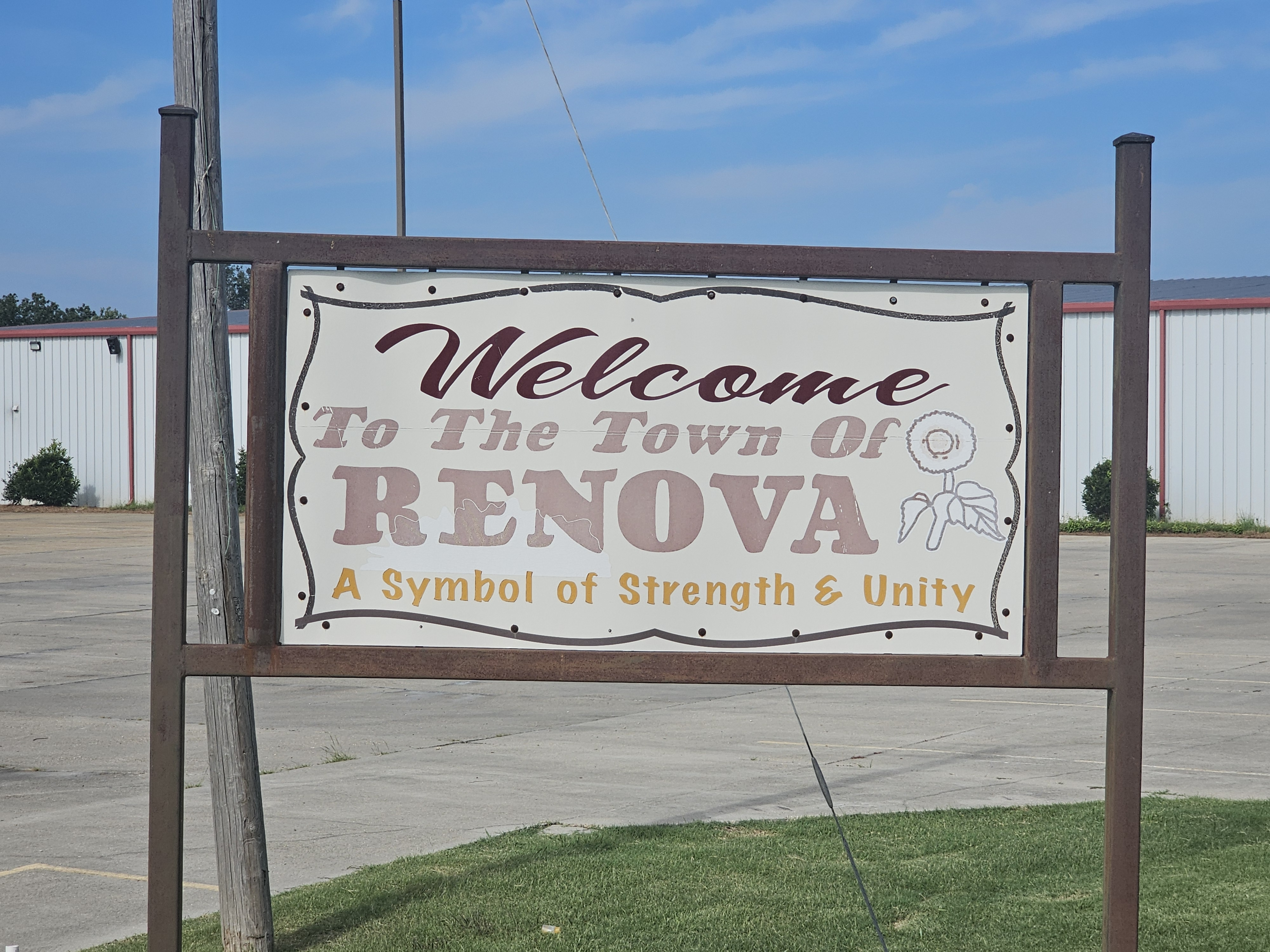
- Welcome sign in Renova

- Location in Bolivar County

- Location within Mississippi Location within the United States
- Coordinates: 33°46′50″N 90°43′24″W
- Country: United States
- State: Mississippi
- County: Bolivar

Area
  - Total: 0.87 sq mi (2.25 km^{2})
  - Land: 0.87 sq mi (2.25 km^{2})
  - Water: 0 sq mi (0.00 km^{2})
- Elevation: 141 ft (43 m)

Population (2020)
  - Total: 676
  - Density: 779/sq mi (300.8/km^{2})
- Time zone: UTC-6 (Central (CST))
  - Summer (DST): UTC-5 (CDT)
- FIPS code: 28-61890
- GNIS feature ID: 2407199

Renova is a town in Bolivar County, Mississippi, United States. Per the 2020 census, the population was 676. The community was founded by African Americans and remains predominantly African American.

== History ==
In 1907, it was noted as a rapidly growing town 3 miles north of Cleveland, Mississippi with a saw mill that was served by the Yazoo & Mississippi Railroad. Monroe Work noted it among his listing of "Negro Towns and Settlements in the United States" in his Negro Yearbook series.

== Geography ==
According to the United States Census Bureau, the town has a total area of 0.85 square miles (2.2 km^{2}), all land.

== Demographics ==
Historical population
Census	Pop.	Note	%±
1980	659		—
1990	636		−3.5%
2000	623		−2.0%
2010	668		7.2%
2020	676		1.2%
U.S. Decennial Census; 2010 2020

=== Racial and ethnic composition ===
Renova town, Mississippi – Racial and ethnic composition Note: the US Census treats Hispanic/Latino as an ethnic category. This table excludes Latinos from the racial categories and assigns them to a separate category. Hispanics/Latinos may be of any race.
Race / Ethnicity (NH = Non-Hispanic)	Pop 2000	Pop 2010	Pop 2020	% 2000	% 2010	% 2020
White alone (NH)	16	19	6	2.57%	2.84%	0.89%
Black or African American alone (NH)	597	631	639	95.83%	94.46%	94.53%
Native American or Alaska Native alone (NH)	0	0	2	0.00%	0.00%	0.30%
Asian alone (NH)	0	1	2	0.00%	0.15%	0.30%
Native Hawaiian or Pacific Islander alone (NH)	0	0	0	0.00%	0.00%	0.00%
Other race alone (NH)	0	0	4	0.00%	0.00%	0.59%
Mixed race or Multiracial (NH)	2	3	14	0.32%	0.45%	2.07%
Hispanic or Latino (any race)	8	14	9	1.28%	2.10%	1.33%
Total	623	668	676	100.00%	100.00%	100.00%

=== 2000 Census ===
As of the census of 2000, there were 623 people, 241 households, and 159 families residing in the town. The population density was 719.6 inhabitants per square mile (277.8/km^{2}). There were 247 housing units at an average density of 285.3 per square mile (110.2/km^{2}). The racial makeup of the town was 2.57% White, 95.99% African American, 1.12% from other races, and 0.32% from two or more races. Hispanic or Latino of any race were 1.28% of the population.

There were 241 households, out of which 34.0% had children under the age of 18 living with them, 35.7% were married couples living together, 23.7% had a female householder with no husband present, and 34.0% were non-families. 31.5% of all households were made up of individuals, and 5.8% had someone living alone who was 65 years of age or older. The average household size was 2.59 and the average family size was 3.28.

In the town, the population was spread out, with 30.0% under the age of 18, 12.5% from 18 to 24, 28.3% from 25 to 44, 23.0% from 45 to 64, and 6.3% who were 65 years of age or older. The median age was 30 years. For every 100 females, there were 92.9 males. For every 100 females age 18 and over, there were 84.7 males.

The median income for a household in the town was $20,481, and the median income for a family was $24,375. Males had a median income of $26,071 versus $20,577 for females. The per capita income for the town was $11,277. About 28.6% of families and 34.5% of the population were below the poverty line, including 44.9% of those under age 18 and 54.8% of those age 65 or over.

== Education ==
Renova is served by the Cleveland School District. Secondary students are zoned to Cleveland Central Middle School and Cleveland Central High School.

It is located minutes from Delta State University and several community colleges.
