= Charlie Capps (politician) =

American politician and legislator

Member of the Mississippi House of Representatives from the 28th district
- In office January 1972 – June 30, 2005
- Preceded by: Dana Moore
- Succeeded by: David Norquist

Personal details
- Born: Charles Wilson Capps, Jr. January 1, 1925 Merigold, Mississippi, U.S.
- Died: December 25, 2009 (aged 84) Cleveland, Mississippi, U.S.
- Party: Democratic
- Spouse: Allen Hobbs
- Education: University of Mississippi

Military service
- Allegiance: United States
- Branch/service: United States Army
- Battles/wars: World War II

Charles Wilson Capps, Jr. (January 1, 1925 – December 25, 2009) was a Mississippi politician and legislator.

He was sheriff of Bolivar County, Mississippi in 1964. From 1972 until 2005, he was a member of the Mississippi House of Representatives.
