= The Cleveland News Leader =

- Type: Sunday morning newspaper
- Founder: David Johnson
- Publisher: David Johnson
- Editor: David Johnson
- Ceased publication: June 3, 2009
- Headquarters: Cleveland, Mississippi
- Circulation: >3,800
- Website: www.clevelandnewsleader.com

The Cleveland News Leader was a Sunday morning newspaper printed from 2004 to 2009 in Cleveland, Mississippi. The newspaper was founded by David Johnson, who served as its editor and publisher. The paper earned a reputation as an unusually hard-nosed newspaper for such a small town, making a name for itself exposing government corruption. The CNL, as it was commonly called, earned its reputation for fearless community journalism.

In the midst of a severe recession and increasingly difficult economic times, The Cleveland News Leader closed its doors on June 3, 2009.

The Cleveland News Leader made news itself when its owners sued the City of Cleveland over the board of aldermen's refusal to award the newspaper the municipality's legal advertising after the paper turned in the low bid. The newspaper claimed it was for political reasons, and eventually won the case with the City of Cleveland settling the lawsuit for an undisclosed amount of money in 2008.

The newspaper's slogan, printed every Sunday in its masthead, was "Regnat Populus," which is Latin for "the people rule."
