= Cleveland School District =

School district in Mississippi, United States

Coordinates: 33.750667°N 90.725241°W

Address
- 305 Merritt Drive Cleveland, Mississippi, 38732; United States

District information
- Type: Public
- Grades: PreK–12
- NCES District ID: 2800750

Students and staff
- Students: 2,968
- Teachers: 225.93
- Staff: 256.68
- Student–teacher ratio: 13.14

Other information
- Website: www.cleveland.k12.ms.us

The Cleveland School District (CSD) is a public school district based in Cleveland, Mississippi (USA).

In addition to Cleveland, the district also serves the towns of Boyle, Renova, and Merigold.

== History ==
In the post-Brown v. Board of Education era, the district received its desegregation lawsuit in 1965, filed by black parents, on behalf of 131 children protesting racial segregation in the district. The case took over 62 years to resolve, and unlike many Southern school districts, the Cleveland School District never consolidated its white and black schools, which until then were actually segregated by law. In 1969 Cleveland High School, historically a White school, opened admission to black students. About 1,000 white people protested at the time Black students were legally allowed to enroll in White schools.

Up to 2016 there were racial demographic differences remaining in the district's schools, with those west of the former railroad tracks having a whiter student body. The district had two sets of secondary schools: a middle school and a high school that were historically white, and a middle school and a high school that were all-black. Margaret Green Junior High School and Cleveland High were historically White, and by 2015 had populations evenly divided between Black and White students. D.M. Smith Middle School and East Side High School had all black student populations. Sharon Lerner of The Atlantic wrote that "As a result, Cleveland has some of the most integrated —and some of the most segregated—public schools in the region." Beginning in 1990 the district made many failed attempts, including a freedom of choice enrollment program allowing any student to enroll in any school with his/her grade level, International Baccalaureate programs, and magnet programs, to encourage White students to enroll in almost all-black schools, but these plans did not work.

The U.S. Justice Department, in 2011, argued that the Cleveland School District had failed to properly integrate the system, reviving the discrimination suit from a dormant state. Until the conclusion of the desegregation case the school district had been proposing to continue operating the two sets of secondary schools with "Freedom of Choice" and magnet programs, although one of its two desegregation programs did advocate merging the middle schools. The U.S. Department of Justice advocated consolidating the schools, arguing that the voluntary programs were not effective and that the black schools were disadvantaged. Part of the resistance against consolidation stemmed from fear that the integrated schools would suffer from white flight if consolidation happened. Jim Tims, a former member of the Cleveland School Board, stated that by consolidating the schools the single high school would be about 30% white, and that since White people do not wish to be "a small minority" they would engage in white flight and enroll in nearby majority white private schools. The school district also argued that more spaces would be available for extracurricular activities if two high schools remained open in Cleveland.

In May 2016 the U.S. District Court for the Northern District of Mississippi ordered the school district to consolidate the schools in order to achieve racial integration. Cleveland High School will house all high school students, while the former East Side High School will house all middle school students. In 2017 the consolidations occurred. Also, all elementary schools will go until the 6th grade.

== Schools ==
Secondary schools:

- Cleveland Central High School – Formed in mid-2017 by the consolidation of Cleveland High School and East Side High School, occupying the former Cleveland High School and Margaret Green Junior High School.
- Cleveland Central Middle School – Formed in mid-2017 by the consolidation of D.M. Smith Middle School and Margaret Green Junior High School, located at the former East Side High School campus.

Elementary schools:

- Grades 1-6
  - D. M. Smith Elementary School (formerly Cypress Park Elementary School) – Its original campus had an "open concept" layout. In 2017 the school moved to the former D. M. Smith Middle School and changed its name.
- Grades K-6
  - Parks Elementary School
  - Pearman Accelerated School
- Grades PreK-6
  - B.L. Bell Academy for Math, Science and Health Education (Boyle)
  - Hayes Cooper Center (Merigold)
  - Nailor Elementary School

Other Campuses:

- Cleveland Career Development and Technology Center
- Walter C. Robinson Achievement Center

== Demographics ==
As of spring 2016 the district had 3,700 students. 66% were black, 30% were white, and 4% were Hispanic and/or Asian.

As of 2016, Margaret Green Middle School had more than 496 students, with 51% of them being black and 43% of them being white. Cleveland High, the historically white high school, was 47% black and 45% white. As of 2016, 99.6% of the 248 students at D.M. Smith Middle School were black, and East Side High, the high school serving the black area, was 100% black. In addition to D.M. Smith and East Side High, Cypress Park and Nailor elementary schools, also located in eastern Cleveland, had enrollments over 95% black. The U.S. Department of Justice hired an investigator who stated in 2009 that the conditions of the almost all-black schools were inferior to the other schools.

The projected enrollment of the consolidated middle school, which opened in 2016, was 692 students, with 71% being black and 26% being white, and the projected enrollment of the high school was 1,098 students, with 63% being black and 32% being white.

== See also ==
- List of school districts in Mississippi
