= WDTL =

Radio station in Indianola, Mississippi

- Indianola, Mississippi; United States
- Broadcast area: Greenville, Mississippi
- Frequency: 105.7 MHz
- Branding: Delta Country 105.7

Programming
- Format: Country
- Affiliations: Fox News Radio; Compass Media Networks

Ownership
- Owner: Delta Radio Network, LLC
- Sister stations: WIQQ, WIBT, WKXY, WKXG, WNIX, WNLA, WNLA-FM, KZYQ, WZYQ, WBYB

History
- First air date: 1969
- Former call signs: WNLA-FM (1979–2012); WIBT (2012–2014); WNOU (2014–2016)
- Former frequencies: 105.5 MHz (1970–2018)
- Call sign meaning: similar to "Delta" (owner and branding)

Technical information
- Licensing authority: FCC
- Facility ID: 59962
- Class: C2
- ERP: 14,000 watts
- HAAT: 159 meters (522 feet)
- Transmitter coordinates: 33°28′41″N 90°38′28″W

Links
- Public license information: Public file; LMS
- Webcast: Listen Live
- Website: deltacountry.com

WDTL (105.7 FM, "Delta Country 105.7") is a radio station licensed to serve Indianola, Mississippi, United States. The station is owned by Delta Radio Network LLC.

WDTL broadcasts a country music format to the greater Greenville, Mississippi, area. Their morning show is hosted by “Big” Steve Kelly, a longtime radio veteran. The station also airs the syndicated "The Original Country Gold with Rowdy Yates" and "Rick Jackson's Country Classics, as well as “Retro Country USA” with Big Steve Kelly on Sunday nights 10-Mid.

== History ==
In August 1984, Fritts Broadcasting, Inc., reached an agreement to sell this station to Shamrock Broadcasting, Inc. The deal was approved by the U.S. Federal Communications Commission (FCC) on October 9, 1984, and the transaction was consummated on October 15, 1984.

In April 2007, Shamrock Broadcasting, Inc., contracted to sell this station and AM sister station WNLA to Debut Broadcasting Corporation, Inc. The deal was approved by the FCC in May 2007 and the transaction consummated in June 2007. Debut sold the station to Delta Radio Network in 2010.

On September 16, 2014, the then-WNOU changed its format from urban contemporary to country, branded as "Delta Country 105.5". The station changed its call sign to the current WDTL on March 9, 2016.
