= Let the People Decide =

2004 book by J. Todd Moye

- Author: J. Todd Moye
- Publisher: University of North Carolina Press
- Publication date: 2004
- ISBN: 9780807855614

Let the People Decide: Black Freedom and White Resistance Movements in Sunflower County, Mississippi, 1945–1986 is a 2004 book written by J. Todd Moye and published by the University of North Carolina Press.

It discusses the events in Sunflower County, Mississippi during the Civil Rights Movement of 1954 through 1968, including a post-Brown v. Board of Education movement and a 1960s action led by Fannie Lou Hamer. The book also chronicles the subsequent aftermath of the Civil Rights Movement until the year 1986. This includes a 1980s education reform movement. The final issue discussed is a Delta Pride strike. Let the People Decide is the first published overview book of the Sunflower County civil rights movements, defined by the author as three separate and interconnected movements. It documents changing African-American attitudes towards race and the background of the White community's resistance movement.

Moye concluded that "the class differences that developed in African American communities over time [which] profoundly affected the goals and strategies of the movements they created" as stated on p. 23. Moye stated that there were many civil rights movements occurring throughout the United States and that the influences of economics and social class also caused differences. On p. 204 Moye stated that at as of 2004, in Sunflower County "a successful civil rights movement created a better business climate"; Mark Newman of the University of Edinburgh stated that Moye did not provide the relevant figures proving this point.

== Background ==
Moye served as the director of the Tuskegee Airmen Oral History Project of the National Park Service (NPS).

The book's title, "Let the People Decide," is a slogan that was used by the Student Nonviolent Coordinating Committee (SNCC) to organize people.

For research, Moye consulted articles, scholarly books, and newspaper articles. The total number of secondary sources used is in the hundreds. Moye also used written primary sources, government documents, and several oral interviews to develop his book. The written primary sources originated from over thirty archival collections. There were a total of 25 oral interviews from both Blacks and Whites. On p. 231 Moye argued that using interviews was important "to tell stories that would otherwise go undocumented" and "to flesh out the framework of events that are described in contemporary written documents". Moye stated on the same page that he did not solely rely on oral interviews because "I do not consider oral history research a substitute for archival research".

== Reception ==
Tiyi Morris of Ohio State University at Newark wrote that the book is "an invaluable contribution to recent scholarship that enhances our understanding of "local movement centers" in the civil rights era".

Monte Piliawsky of Wayne State University stated that the book and a suggested companion book, Life and Death in the Delta by Kim Lacy Rogers, both have "compelling collective memoirs of the trauma, suffering, resistance, and achievement of the civil rights movement in the darkest of venues, the Mississippi Delta."

Jonathan Rosenberg of Hunter College concluded that the book was a "compelling analysis of how and why" the racial situation in Sunflower County changed.

Gilles Vandal of the Université de Sherbrooke stated that it was "gracefully writen [sic]" and that it "adds significantly to the growing body of literature on the civil rights movement [sic]".

Nan Elizabeth Woodruff of Pennsylvania State University concluded that the book "adds to a growing literature that illuminates the daily details of life and struggle of black people in communities throughout the South."

== See also ==
- Educational segregation in Mississippi Delta
