= Margaret Wade (basketball) =

American college basketball player and coach

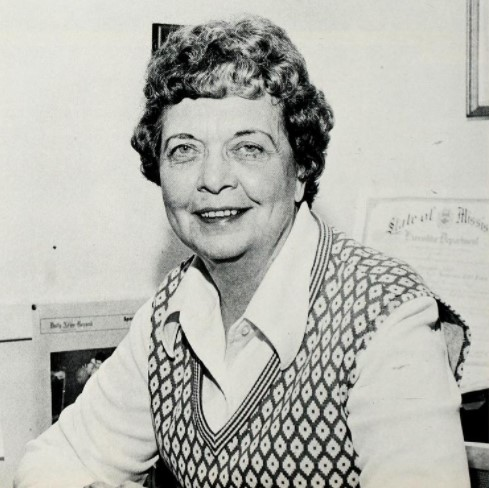
- Wade during the 1976–77 season

Biographical details
- Born: December 30, 1912; McCool, Mississippi, U.S.
- Died: February 16, 1995 (aged 82); Cleveland, Mississippi, U.S.

Playing career
- 1929–1932: Delta State

Coaching career (HC unless noted)
- 1973–1979: Delta State

Head coaching record
- Overall: 157–23

Accomplishments and honors

Championships
- 3 AIAW (1975–1977)
- Basketball Hall of Fame; Inducted in 1985 (profile)
- Women's Basketball Hall of Fame

Lily Margaret Wade (December 30, 1912 – February 16, 1995) was an American basketball player and coach. Wade was inducted in the inaugural class at the Women's Basketball Hall of Fame in 1999.

== Early years ==
Margaret Wade was the youngest of eight children born to Robert and Bittie Wade in Cleveland, Mississippi. She grew up in Cleveland, playing forward for the Cleveland High School girls basketball team. She made the All-Conference team in 1928 and 1929.

== College ==
Wade played college basketball for Delta State University in 1930-1932. In her second season, she was named captain of the team and earned All-Conference honors. In her junior year, she continued as captain, and was named the team's most valuable player. Over the three years, the team's record was 28–5–2. In her junior year, the school decided the game was "too strenuous for women" and dropped the program. Wade was very upset; she and her teammates decided to burn their uniforms.

== AAU ==
Wade played for two years for the Mississippi Tupelo Redwings, a nearby AAU team. She was the team captain and helped her team reach the Southern Championship. Her playing career was cut short by a knee injury.

== Coaching career ==
Wade started her coaching career at Marietta High School in Marietta, Mississippi in 1933. Her first year, the team had a record of 12–2. She then moved on to coach at Belden High school, where her team had a record of 11–3. After that, she coached Cleveland High School's girls basketball team from 1935 to 1954 with a 453-89-6 record. Her teams won the Bolivar County Championships and entered the North Mississippi tournament fourteen out of her last fifteen years, and came in second in the state championships three consecutive years. Wade also coached the girls' track team to consecutive state championships in 1958 and 1959.

When Delta State restarted the women's basketball team in 1973, Wade became the coach for them. They won three consecutive national championships at the AIAW women's basketball tournament in 1975, 1976 and 1977. Those seasons included a 51-game winning streak. She also coached a future Basketball Hall of Fame inductee Lusia Harris-Stewart.

Cleveland High School's Margaret Wade Gymnasium, on the campus of Margaret Green Junior High School, was named in her honor in 1977. The top women's collegiate player is now awarded the Wade Trophy named after her. She was inducted into the International Women's Sports Hall of Fame in 1992. She was enshrined in the Basketball Hall of Fame in 1985 and in the Women's Basketball Hall of Fame in 1999.

A Mississippi Historical Marker honoring Margaret Wade was unveiled on the front lawn of Cleveland High School on October 11, 2008.
