= Alice Haining =

American actress

Alice Haining (born October 8, 1957) is an American actress.

== Early years ==
Born in Jackson, Mississippi, Haining is the daughter of Dr. Joe L. Haining and Jean Haining. Her father was a research chemist, and her mother was a teacher. Haining was valedictorian of her class at Woodland Hills Academy and at Mississippi College. She graduated from the latter in 1981 with majors in English and modern languages.

== Career ==
Before she became active on stage in New York City, Haining produced Figure Out, a children's program, for Mississippi Educational Television.

Haining's career was largely in daytime soaps, beginning in 1982 when she played Jodie Fields on Search for Tomorrow. She then went on to play the role of Liza Colby on All My Children in 1984, replacing Marcy Walker who had left the show. She also portrayed the role of Cecilia Thompson Sowolosky on Loving from 1985 to 1986. Haining is perhaps best known for playing Angel Lange Snyder on the CBS soap opera As the World Turns, where she was on from 1988 to 1994.

Haining portrayed Marcia Giles in a 1991 Circle in the Square Theatre production of the play On Borrowed Time, written by Paul Osborn. On film, she acted in A Shock to the System (1990) and Top of the World (1994). Her off-Broadway credits include playing Helen in Emerald City (1988), Beth in Swim Visit (1990), Armande in The Learned Ladies (1991), and Tood in The Cover of Life (1994).

== Filmography ==
Film and television
Year	Title	Role	Notes
1982	Search for Tomorrow	Jodie Fields	Television series
1984–85	All My Children	Liza Colby	Regular role
1985	Spenser: For Hire	Kay Redfield	"Autumn Thieves"
1985–86	Loving	Cecilia Thompson Sowolsky	Television series
1986	Ike		Television film
1987	Spenser: For Hire	Linda Arpel	"Trial and Error"
1986	One Life to Live	Susan Bates	Television series
1988–1994	As the World Turns	Angel Lange Snyder	Television series
1989	American Playhouse	Holly	"Ask Me Again"
1990	A Shock to the System	Benham's Secretary	
1993	Top of the World	Megan	
1996	Swift Justice	Janet Maxey	"Supernote"
