= Stanley F. Gaines =

American politician

Member of the Mississippi House of Representatives from the Bolivar County district
- In office 1916-1920

Personal details
- Born: February 12, 1891 Bowling Green, Kentucky, U.S.
- Died: September 17, 1950 (aged 59) Boyle, Mississippi, U.S.
- Party: Democrat

Stanley Francis Gaines (February 12, 1891 – September 17, 1950) was an American politician who served as a Democratic member of the Mississippi House of Representatives, representing Bolivar County, from 1916 to 1920.

== Biography ==
Stanley Francis Gaines was born on February 12, 1891, in Bowling Green, Kentucky. His parents were Len H. Gaines and Mary Jannette (Francis) Gaines. He attended the University of Mississippi. He was a First Lieutenant of the Mississippi National Guard. He was the Alderman of Boyle, Mississippi, from 1913 to 1915. In 1915, he was elected to the Mississippi House of Representatives, representing Bolivar County, as a Democrat. He married Louise C. Coats in 1915. He died in Boyle, Mississippi in September 1950 at the age of 59.
