= Cleveland Central High School =

Location
- 300 W Sunflower Rd, Cleveland, MS

Information
- Established: 2017
- School district: Cleveland School District
- Principal: Ashondra Johnson
- Staff: 47.97 (on an FTE basis)
- Enrollment: 816 (2023–2024)
- Student to teacher ratio: 17.01
- Colors: Purple, Black
- Mascot: Wolf
- Website: cchs.cleveland.k12.ms.us

For other schools, see Cleveland High School (disambiguation)

Cleveland Central High School is a public high school in Cleveland, Mississippi. The sole high school of the Cleveland School District, it serves Cleveland, Boyle, Renova, and Merigold.

The school occupies the grounds of the old Cleveland High School and Margaret Green Junior High School. Cleveland Central High School itself was formed in 2017 as a consolidation of Cleveland High School and East Side High School after U.S. federal judge Debra M. Brown ordered that they consolidate, as the schools were accused of being segregated. The decision was the result of a court case beginning in 1965.

== Athletics ==
Currently, Cleveland Central High School competes in the Mississippi High School Activities Association (MHSAA) 5A athletics in 13 different sports: soccer, cross country, track and field, football, basketball, swimming, baseball, softball, cheerleading, dance, volleyball, powerlifting, and bowling, as well as a competitive marching and concert band program.

== Notable alumni ==
- Markel Bell, college football offensive tackle for the Miami Hurricanes
- KJ Williams, professional basketball player for the Boulazac Basket Dordogne of the LNB Pro A
