= John Eubanks =

American gridiron football player (born 1983)

No. 34, 25
- Position: Cornerback

Personal information
- Born: July 13, 1983 (age 43); Mound Bayou, Mississippi
- Listed height: 5 ft 10 in (1.78 m)
- Listed weight: 173 lb (78 kg)

Career information
- High school: Cleveland (MS)
- College: Southern Mississippi
- NFL draft: 2006: undrafted

Career history
- Washington Redskins (2006–2007); Winnipeg Blue Bombers (2009)*; Calgary Stampeders (2009–2010); Saskatchewan Roughriders (2011)
- * Offseason or practice squad member only

Awards and highlights
- Freshman All-Conference USA (2002); 2x First-team All-Conference USA (2003-2004); C-USA Special Teams Player of the Year (2004)

Career CFL statistics
- Tackles: 36
- Interceptions: 1
- Stats at CFL.ca (archived)
- Stats at Pro Football Reference

John Eubanks (born July 13, 1983) is a former professional American and Canadian football cornerback. He most recently played for the Saskatchewan Roughriders of the Canadian Football League (CFL). He was signed by the Washington Redskins as an undrafted free agent in 2006. He played college football at Southern Mississippi.

Eubanks has also been a member of the Winnipeg Blue Bombers and Calgary Stampeders.

Eubanks was charged with one count of conspiracy to commit wire fraud and health care fraud, two counts of wire fraud, and two counts of health care fraud by the United States Department of Justice on December 12, 2019. He initially pleaded not guilty to the charges, but changed his plea to guilty by July 2020. In October 2021, Eubanks was sentenced to 18 months in federal prison.
