= WBYB (FM) =

- Cleveland, Mississippi; United States
- Broadcast area: Mississippi Delta area
- Frequency: 98.3 MHz
- Branding: Oldies 98.3

Programming
- Format: Oldies
- Affiliations: Fox News Radio; Compass Media Networks

Ownership
- Owner: Delta Radio Network, LLC; (John N. and Lynn C. Allen)
- Sister stations: WDTL, WIBT, WKXY, WKXG, WNIX, WNLA, WNLA-FM, KZYQ, WZYQ, WIQQ

History
- First air date: 1993 (as WDFX)
- Former call signs: WDFX (1992–2017)

Technical information
- Licensing authority: FCC
- Facility ID: 1528
- Class: C3
- ERP: 25,000 watts
- HAAT: 100 meters (330 ft)
- Transmitter coordinates: 33°52′49.0″N 90°42′33.5″W

Links
- Public license information: Public file; LMS
- Webcast: Listen Live
- Website: www.deltaradio.net/stations/oldies983/

WBYB (98.3 MHz) is an FM radio station licensed to Cleveland, Mississippi. The station broadcasts an oldies format branded as Oldies 98.3.

The station formerly operated as WDFX, an owned-and-operated outlet of American Family Radio. In 2017, the station was sold by the American Family Association to John and Lynn Allen for $150,000; John is a stakeholder in Delta Radio Networks, which operates several stations in northwest Mississippi. The acquisition by the Allens was consummated on December 7, 2017, at which point the station flipped to an oldies format and changed its call sign to WBYB.

The station broadcasts the syndicated "Murphy, Sam & Jodi" morning show as well as John Tesh's "Music & Intelligence for Your Life." "Dick Bartley's Rock & Roll's Greatest Hits" is featured on the weekend.
