= Woodland Hills Academy (Mississippi) =

Closed segregation academy in Mississippi

Woodland Hills Baptist Academy

Location
- Jackson, Mississippi; 32.366132°N 90.161138°W

Information
- Type: Private
- Opened: 1970
- Principal: Sessums
- Campus size: 18 acres (7.3 ha)
- Campus type: Small city

Woodland Hills Baptist Academy was a private high school in Jackson, Mississippi, established in 1969 when the Jackson School Board was ordered to desegregate following the landmark Brown v. Board of Education Supreme Court ruling. Woodland Hills was one of many private schools formed in Mississippi. In 1963, there were 17 private schools in the state; by 1970 there were 236.

When the school opened in 1970, the Mississippi state Textbook Department illegally supplied books to the academy.

Jackson, Mississippi was the home of the single largest sponsor of private segregated schools (segregation academies) in the United States, the Citizens' Council

The campus site known variously as 401 Sheppard Road and 5055 Manhattan Road was the site of Council Manhattan High School (1966-1983). Woodland Hills Baptist Academy took over the site. Across the street was 5055 Manhattan Road, apparently the site of Council Manhattan High School (1966-1983). Both facilities were abandoned by 2008.

== Notable alumni ==
- Alice Haining, actress

== See also ==
- Education segregation in the Mississippi Red Clay region
