= Boyle, Mississippi =

- Town
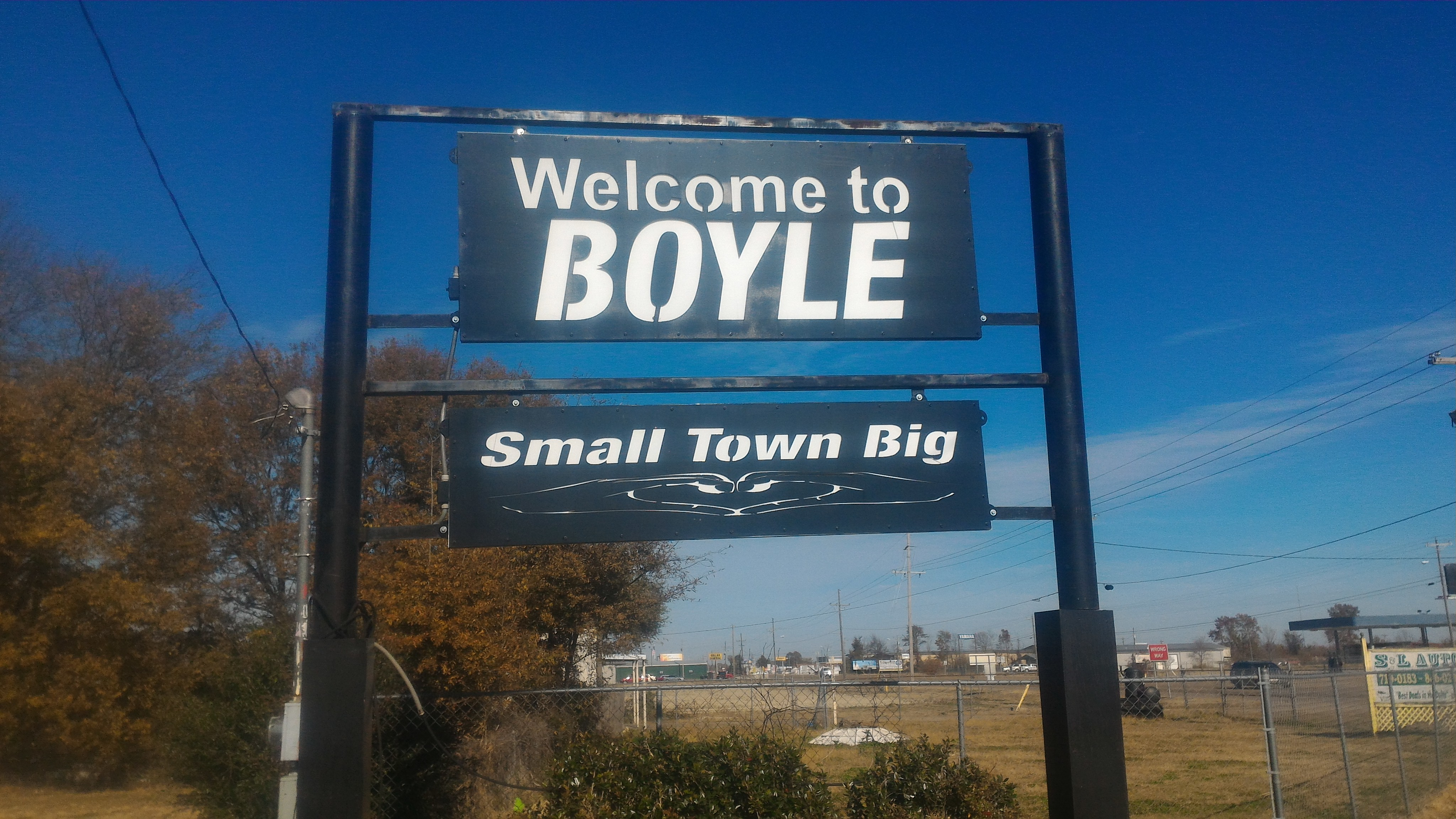
- Welcome sign in Boyle

- Location of Boyle, Mississippi

- Location in the United States
- Coordinates: 33°42′23″N 90°43′30″W
- Country: United States
- State: Mississippi
- County: Bolivar

Area
  - Total: 1.47 sq mi (3.82 km^{2})
  - Land: 1.47 sq mi (3.82 km^{2})
  - Water: 0 sq mi (0.00 km^{2})
- Elevation: 138 ft (42 m)

Population (2020)
  - Total: 532
  - Density: 360/sq mi (139.1/km^{2})
- Time zone: UTC-6 (Central (CST))
  - Summer (DST): UTC-5 (CDT)
- ZIP code: 38730
- Area code: 662
- FIPS code: 28-08180
- GNIS feature ID: 2405309

Boyle is a town in Bolivar County, Mississippi, United States. As of the 2020 census, Boyle had a population of 532.

== Geography ==
According to the United States Census Bureau, the town has a total area of 1.5 square miles (3.8 km^{2}), of which 1.4 square miles (3.6 km^{2}) is land and 0.077 square miles (0.2 km^{2}), or 4.87%, is water.

== Demographics ==
Historical population
Census	Pop.	Note	%±
1900	538		—
1910	444		−17.5%
1920	702		58.1%
1930	678		−3.4%
1940	742		9.4%
1950	799		7.7%
1960	848		6.1%
1970	861		1.5%
1980	888		3.1%
1990	651		−26.7%
2000	720		10.6%
2010	650		−9.7%
2020	532		−18.2%
U.S. Decennial Census

=== Racial and ethnic composition ===
Boyle town, Mississippi – Racial and ethnic composition Note: the US Census treats Hispanic/Latino as an ethnic category. This table excludes Latinos from the racial categories and assigns them to a separate category. Hispanics/Latinos may be of any race.
Race / Ethnicity (NH = Non-Hispanic)	Pop 2000	Pop 2010	Pop 2020	% 2000	% 2010	% 2020
White alone (NH)	380	307	256	52.78%	47.23%	48.12%
Black or African American alone (NH)	323	311	242	44.86%	47.85%	45.49%
Native American or Alaska Native alone (NH)	0	4	1	0.00%	0.62%	0.19%
Asian alone (NH)	1	0	2	0.14%	0.00%	0.38%
Native Hawaiian or Pacific Islander alone (NH)	1	0	0	0.14%	0.00%	0.00%
Other race alone (NH)	0	0	0	0.00%	0.00%	0.00%
Mixed race or Multiracial (NH)	5	8	10	0.69%	1.23%	1.88%
Hispanic or Latino (any race)	10	20	21	1.39%	3.08%	3.95%
Total	720	650	532	100.00%	100.00%	100.00%

=== 2020 census ===
As of the 2020 United States census, there were 532 people, 329 households, and 213 families residing in the town.

=== 2000 census ===
As of the census of 2000, there were 720 people, 268 households, and 191 families residing in the town. The population density was 712.8 inhabitants per square mile (275.2/km^{2}). There were 290 housing units at an average density of 287.1 per square mile (110.8/km^{2}). The racial makeup of the town was 52.78% White, 45.14% African American, 0.14% Asian, 0.14% Pacific Islander, 1.11% from other races, and 0.69% from two or more races. Hispanic or Latino of any race were 1.39% of the population.

There were 268 households, out of which 38.1% had children under the age of 18 living with them, 41.0% were married couples living together, 23.9% had a female householder with no husband present, and 28.4% were non-families. 25.7% of all households were made up of individuals, and 8.2% had someone living alone who was 65 years of age or older. The average household size was 2.69 and the average family size was 3.22.

In the town, the population was spread out, with 33.3% under the age of 18, 7.5% from 18 to 24, 27.5% from 25 to 44, 22.6% from 45 to 64, and 9.0% who were 65 years of age or older. The median age was 32 years. For every 100 females, there were 93.0 males. For every 100 females age 18 and over, there were 89.7 males.

The median income for a household in the town was $26,429, and the median income for a family was $28,500. Males had a median income of $25,625 versus $30,104 for females. The per capita income for the town was $15,181. About 19.5% of families and 27.2% of the population were below the poverty line, including 43.2% of those under age 18 and 6.2% of those age 65 or over.

== Education ==
Boyle is served by the Cleveland School District. There is one school in Boyle, B.L. Bell Academy for Math, Science and Health Education. Secondary students attend Cleveland Central Middle School and Cleveland Central High School.

== Historic marker ==
The Mississippi Blues Commission placed a historic marker at the Peavine Railroad site intersection with Highway 446 in Boyle, designating it as a site on the Mississippi Blues Trail. The marker commemorates the original lyrics of famed blues artist Charlie Patton's "Peavine Blues", which describes the railway branch of the Yazoo and Mississippi Valley Railroad which ran west from Dockery Plantation to Boyle. A common theme of blues songs was riding on the railroad, which was a metaphor for travel and escape.

== Notable people ==
- Stanley F. Gaines, member of the Mississippi House of Representatives from 1916 to 1920
- Jim Pittman, former head football coach for Tulane University and Texas Christian University
- Tommy Taylor, member of the Mississippi House of Representatives from 2012 to 2016
