= KZYQ (FM) =

- Eudora, Arkansas; United States
- Broadcast area: Arkansas and Mississippi Delta area (Greenville, Mississippi)
- Frequency: 101.5 MHz
- Branding: Star 101

Programming
- Format: Urban adult contemporary
- Affiliations: Compass Media Networks

Ownership
- Owner: Larry Fuss; (Contemporary Communications LLC)
- Sister stations: WDTL; WIBT; WKXY; WKXG; WNIX; WNLA; WIQQ; WBYB; WZYQ

History
- First air date: 1997
- Former call signs: KAVH (1997–2018)

Technical information
- Licensing authority: FCC
- Facility ID: 82035
- Class: A
- ERP: 6,000 watts
- HAAT: 100 meters (330 ft)
- Transmitter coordinates: 33°11′58″N 91°15′39″W
- Repeater: 101.7 WZYQ (Mound Bayou, Mississippi)

Links
- Public license information: Public file; LMS
- Webcast: Listen live
- Website: www.deltaradio.net/stations/star101/

KZYQ (101.5 MHz) is an FM radio station licensed to Eudora, Arkansas, United States. The office and studios are located at 830 Main Street in Greenville, Mississippi. The station is owned by Larry Fuss, through licensee Contemporary Communications LLC, and operated by Delta Radio Network LLC
