= Merigold, Mississippi =

- Town
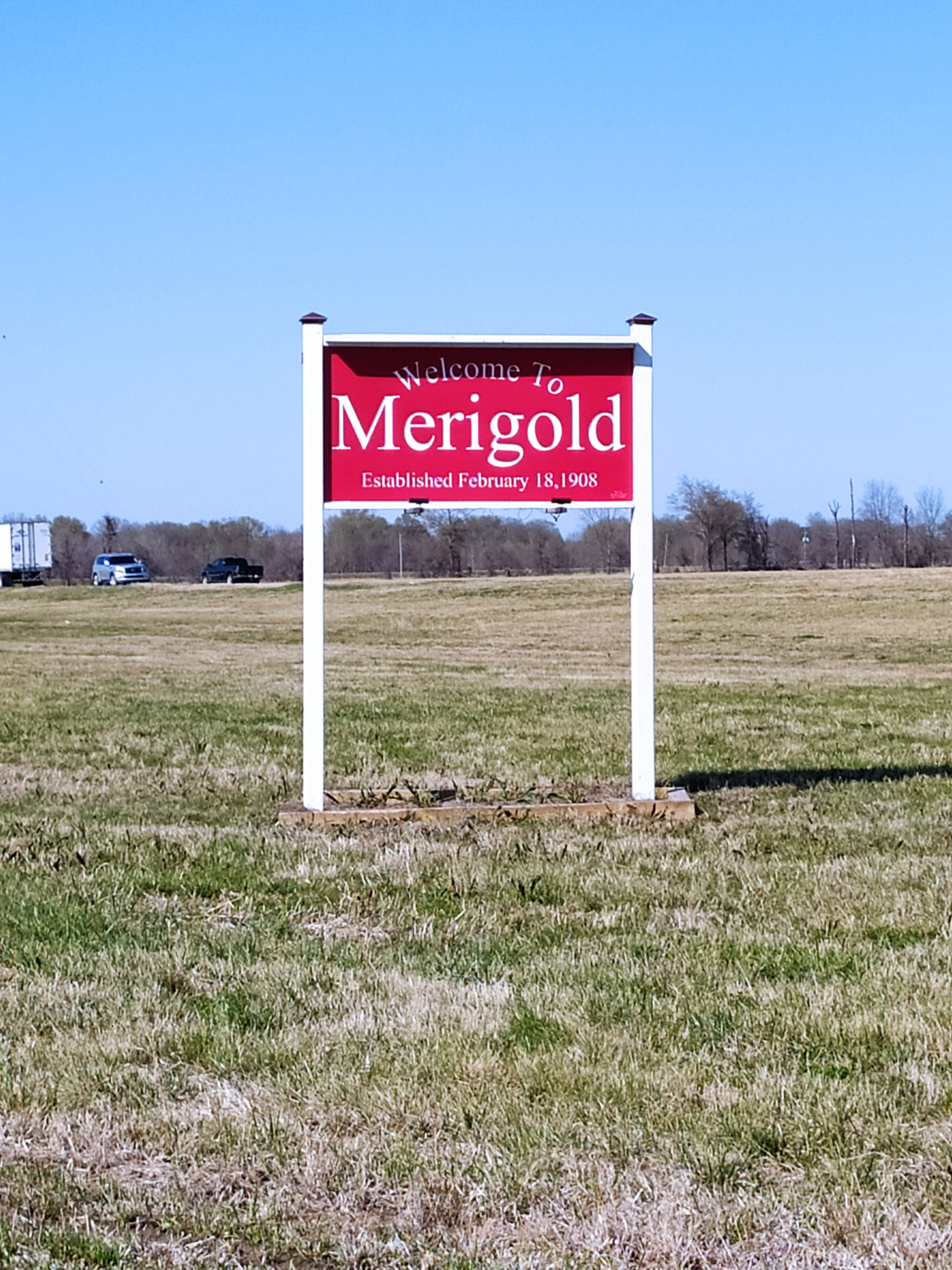
- Welcome sign in Merigold

- Location of Merigold, Mississippi

- Location in the United States
- Coordinates: 33°50′21″N 90°43′35″W
- Country: United States
- State: Mississippi
- County: Bolivar

Area
  - Total: 0.97 sq mi (2.51 km^{2})
  - Land: 0.97 sq mi (2.51 km^{2})
  - Water: 0 sq mi (0.00 km^{2})
- Elevation: 144 ft (44 m)

Population (2020)
  - Total: 379
  - Density: 391.2/sq mi (151.05/km^{2})
- Time zone: UTC-6 (Central (CST))
  - Summer (DST): UTC-5 (CDT)
- ZIP code: 38759
- Area code: 662
- FIPS code: 28-46720
- GNIS feature ID: 2406148

Merigold (sometimes misspelled as Marigold or Merrigold) is a town in Bolivar County, Mississippi, United States. Per the 2020 census, the population was 379.

== Geography ==
According to the United States Census Bureau, the town has a total area of 1.0 square mile (2.6 km^{2}), all land.

== Demographics ==
Historical population
Census	Pop.	Note	%±
1910	241		—
1920	606		151.5%
1930	804		32.7%
1940	704		−12.4%
1950	682		−3.1%
1960	602		−11.7%
1970	772		28.2%
1980	574		−25.6%
1990	572		−0.3%
2000	664		16.1%
2010	439		−33.9%
2020	379		−13.7%
U.S. Decennial Census; 2010 2020

=== Racial and ethnic composition ===
Merigold town, Mississippi – Racial and ethnic composition Note: the US Census treats Hispanic/Latino as an ethnic category. This table excludes Latinos from the racial categories and assigns them to a separate category. Hispanics/Latinos may be of any race.
Race / Ethnicity (NH = Non-Hispanic)	Pop 2000	Pop 2010	Pop 2020	% 2000	% 2010	% 2020
White alone (NH)	283	182	159	42.62%	41.46%	41.95%
Black or African American alone (NH)	373	221	201	56.17%	50.34%	53.03%
Native American or Alaska Native alone (NH)	0	0	0	0.00%	0.00%	0.00%
Asian alone (NH)	1	11	4	0.15%	2.51%	1.06%
Native Hawaiian or Pacific Islander alone (NH)	0	0	0	0.00%	0.00%	0.00%
Other race alone (NH)	1	0	2	0.15%	0.00%	0.53%
Mixed race or Multiracial (NH)	1	8	8	0.15%	1.82%	2.11%
Hispanic or Latino (any race)	5	17	5	0.75%	3.87%	1.32%
Total	664	439	379	100.00%	100.00%	100.00%

=== 2000 Census ===
As of the census of 2000, there were 664 people, 268 households, and 191 families residing in the town. The population density was 686.1 inhabitants per square mile (264.9/km^{2}). There were 280 housing units at an average density of 289.3 per square mile (111.7/km^{2}). The racial makeup of the town was 42.62% White, 56.93% African American, 0.15% Asian, 0.15% from other races, and 0.15% from two or more races. Hispanic or Latino of any race were 0.75% of the population.

There were 268 households, out of which 28.0% had children under the age of 18 living with them, 42.9% were married couples living together, 23.1% had a female householder with no husband present, and 28.7% were non-families. 24.6% of all households were made up of individuals, and 10.8% had someone living alone who was 65 years of age or older. The average household size was 2.48 and the average family size was 2.96.

In the town, the population was spread out, with 23.8% under the age of 18, 9.3% from 18 to 24, 25.8% from 25 to 44, 24.2% from 45 to 64, and 16.9% who were 65 years of age or older. The median age was 39 years. For every 100 females, there were 82.4 males. For every 100 females age 18 and over, there were 78.8 males.

The median income for a household in the town was $24,375, and the median income for a family was $27,500. Males had a median income of $26,250 versus $21,250 for females. The per capita income for the town was $16,185. About 21.4% of families and 23.7% of the population were below the poverty line, including 35.6% of those under age 18 and 18.4% of those age 65 or over.

== Education ==
Merigold is served by the Cleveland School District. The district operates the Hayes Cooper Center for Math and Science, located on old Highway 61. Secondary students are zoned to Cleveland Central Middle School and Cleveland Central High School.

As of 2002 some children in Merigold attended the North Sunflower Academy in unincorporated Sunflower County.

== Entertainment ==
Po' Monkey's is a juke joint located approximately 1 mile (1.6 km) west of Merigold. The Mississippi Blues Commission placed a historic marker at the Po Monkey's Lounge in 2009 designating it as a site on the Mississippi Blues Trail for its contribution to the development of the blues (and one of the few authentic juke joints that is still operating today).

== Notable people ==
- Charlie Capps, member of the Mississippi House of Representatives from 1972 to 2005
- Esther Golar, Illinois state representative, was born in Merigold.
- Walter B. Parks, member of the Mississippi Legislature from 1912 to 1920
- Larry Speakes, acting press secretary in the Ronald Reagan administration, grew up in Merigold.
