= Cleveland High School (Cleveland, Mississippi) =

Public high school in Mississippi, US

Coordinates: 33°44′55″N 90°43′30″W

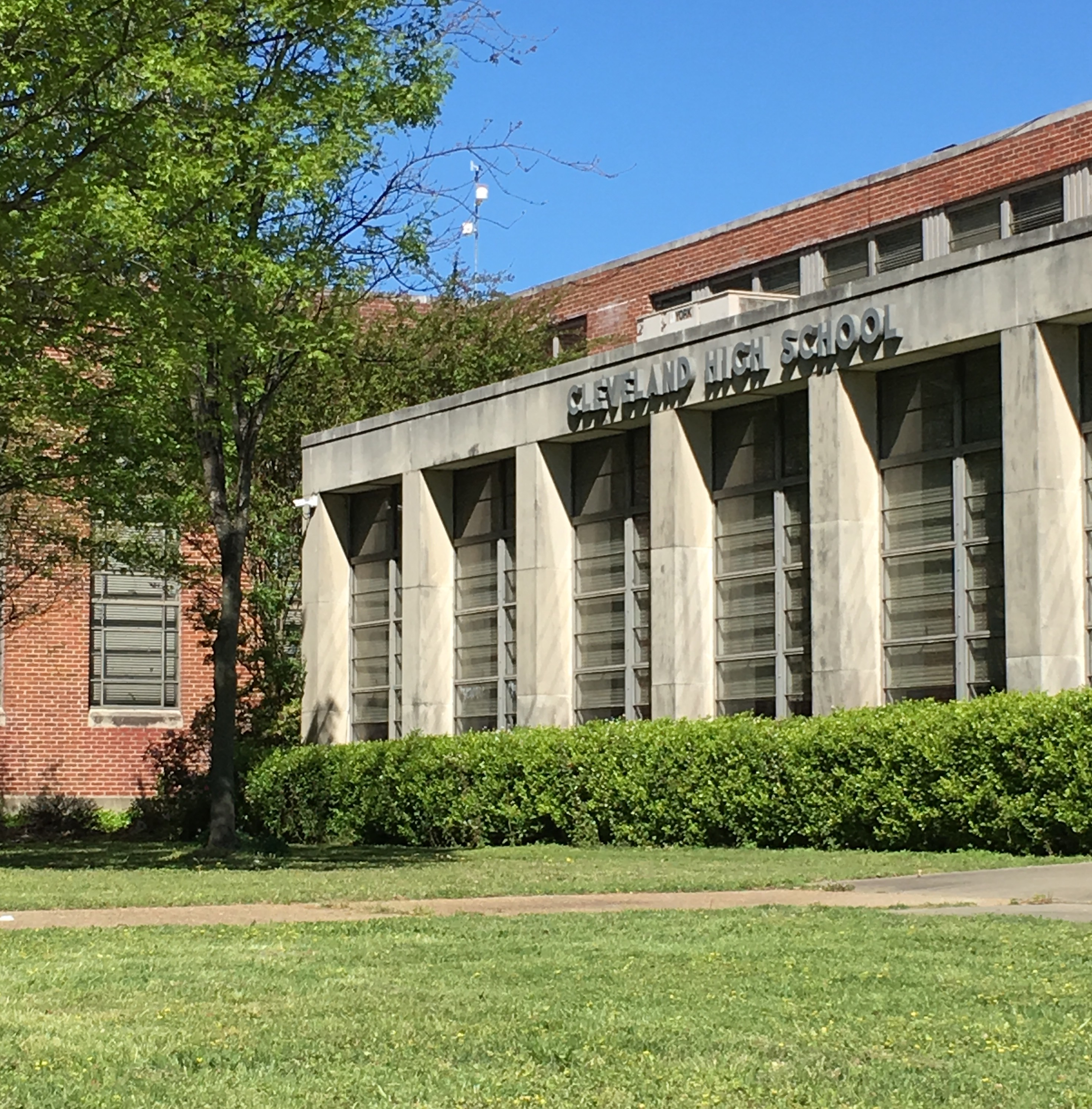

Information
- Type: Public high school
- Established: 1906
- Closed: 2017
- School district: Cleveland School District
- Grades: 9–12
- Colors: Black and Gold
- Mascot: Wildcats

Cleveland High School was a public high school that served students in grades 9–12, located in Cleveland, Mississippi. After it and East Side High were ordered to consolidate, it was renamed Cleveland Central High School, and East Side High was converted to Cleveland Central Middle School. It was a part of the Cleveland School District.

== History ==
Cleveland High School opened its doors October 15, 1906, with A. K. Eckles as principal. The original building, a two-story colonial design with four classrooms, was located where the present building now stands. The school's first athletic event was a baseball game in April 1907. The CHS band was first organized in 1909 [there is strong evidence that suggests CHS had the first high school band in Mississippi]. The first graduation was held in June 1910; there were four graduates. An addition with an auditorium was added to the original structure in 1916. Fire destroyed this building in 1918.

A new, three-story brick building, designed to be the "largest and handsomest" school in Mississippi, was completed at the same location in 1921. On this campus in 1922, the movement that led to the creation of Delta State University began. CHS was the sponsor of Cleveland's first Boy Scout troop, and, at various times, served as the meeting place of the First Methodist Church, the local Jewish community, the Rotary Club, the Exchange Club, and the Delta Medical Association. Also in 1922, CHS was accredited by the Southern Association of Colleges and Schools. The school's first of 30 state championships was won in 1935 in Debate. During World War II, some 600 CHS alumni and students served in the U.S. military; sixteen died in the war. The epicenter of patriotic activity in Cleveland during World War II, Cleveland High School's second building was destroyed by fire Christmas Eve, 1945.

The present high school building and cafeteria were completed in 1950, the band hall in 1963.

Integrated in 1965, CHS was the first public school in the Mississippi Delta to admit black students. Integration came as a result of a racial discrimination lawsuit first filed in 1965.

About 200 black students who were otherwise assigned to East Side High School enrolled in Cleveland High School immediately after the Cleveland School District established a "freedom of choice" plan allowing students to transfer to any school in the district.

In 2000, hundreds of alumni, students, and parents volunteered thousands of man-hours giving the school a much-needed makeover. Cleveland High School celebrated its 100th birthday in October 2006 with a three-day Centennial Celebration that was attended by more than 700 alumni and guests. In October 2008, a Mississippi Historical Marker honoring Margaret Wade ('29) was placed on the school's front lawn. The school's 100th graduating class celebrated its commencement in May 2010.

By 2015 Cleveland High had become racially mixed, while the other high school in Cleveland, East Side High retained an overwhelming black majority. Sharon Lerner of The Atlantic wrote that "a fondness for the current incarnation of Cleveland High" had developed, and that some Cleveland residents did not want to risk this by forcing Cleveland High to consolidate with East Side. This remained a possibility as the racial discrimination suit was still active. Jim Tims, a former member of the Cleveland School Board, stated that by consolidating the schools the single high school would be about 30% white, and that since White people do not wish to be "a small minority" they would engage in white flight and enroll in nearby majority white private schools.

In January 2016, test scores for Cleveland High School grade 10 students who had participated in the PARCC assessment of English skills were 18 points above the state average and 28 points above the 267,000-student PARCC average. Principal Steven Craddock commented: "this proves what we have known for some time...that our students are just as sharp as teens in other, more affluent parts of our state...it also shows that CHS is striving to live up to our motto, 'Ever to Excel'."

In May 2016 the U.S. District Court for the Northern District of Mississippi ordered the school district to consolidate the Cleveland High with East Side High School for desegregation purposes. Cleveland Central High School now houses all high school students, while the former East Side High School (now Cleveland Central Middle School) now houses all middle school students.

The final graduation ceremony was held in 2017.

== Athletics ==
During its final year, Cleveland High School competed in the Mississippi High School Activities Association (MHSAA) 4A athletics in 12 different sports. Cleveland High maintains programs in soccer, cross country, track and field, football, basketball, swimming, baseball, softball, cheerleading, dance, volleyball, and powerlifting, as well as a competitive marching and concert band program. The band program was the first of its kind in the state of Mississippi and remained the only competitive corp style marching band in the Mississippi Delta region.

== Notable alumni ==
- David Bowen, U.S. Representative from Mississippi
- Charles Clark, U.S. Court of Appeals judge (1969–1992)
- Kay Beevers Cobb, Mississippi Supreme Court Justice (1999–2007)
- Pat Coleman, professional American football player for the New England Patriots and Houston Oilers
- John Eubanks, CFL player for the Calgary Stampeders
- Kevin Rogers, Major League Baseball pitcher for the San Francisco Giants
- Sarita Simmons, member of the Mississippi State Senate for the 13th district
- Margaret Wade American basketball player, coach, and Basketball Hall of Fame inductee
- Wirt Williams, American novelist, journalist, and professor of English
