= East Side High School (Mississippi) =

School in Mississippi, United States

Location
- 33.7391°N 90.7126°W

Information
- Type: Public High School
- Closed: 2017
- School district: Cleveland School District
- Grades: 9-12
- Enrollment: 360
- Colors: Black and Gold
- Mascot: Trojan

East Side High School was a senior high school in Cleveland, Mississippi, within the Mississippi Delta region. It was a part of the Cleveland School District and the building itself remains such as a middle school. In September 2017, it was merged into Cleveland Central High School.

As of 2016, it was an all-black high school. Historically African-Americans lived in the eastern part of Cleveland. Their teams were known as the Trojans.

== History ==
It opened as a segregated black school, Cleveland Colored Consolidated High School.

For a long period B. L. Bell, known as "Professor Bell," served as the principal of the historic black school. He became an informant, for the Mississippi State Sovereignty Commission, a pro-segregation state agency of Mississippi, during the Civil Rights Movement. Bell received $100 (about $1104.45 according to inflation) on a monthly basis to establish a network of African-American informers by 1959, as that year Bell had proposed establishing a spy network to Governor of Mississippi James P. Coleman. Bell also recorded NAACP meetings in his area, sending the information to the commission. Bell denied being paid by the commission when he was openly accused of disloyalty in NAACP meetings. Charles C. Bolton, author of The Hardest Deal of All: The Battle Over School Integration in Mississippi, 1870-1980, wrote that the suspicion against him made Bell an ineffective informer. B. L. Bell, Jr., the man's son, stated in a 1996 interview that his father believed black teachers and students were not "qualified enough" for white schools, and this is why he believed his father would cooperate with the commission.

From 1988 to 1997 Leroy Byars served as the principal. He was the American football coach previously, from 1972 to 1987. The American football field at East Side High was named after him.

The Cleveland School District made several failed attempts to encourage white students to enroll at East Side High. In the 1990s the Cleveland School District established magnet programs to East Side High. At another point it established a "Freedom of Choice" program to allow all students in the school district the ability to attend a different school instead of a neighborhood school. In 2012 the school district opened an International Baccalaureate at East Side High. Despite these efforts East Side High remained almost all black.

In 2015 the school had 360 students, and all but one were black. As of 2016 all of its students were black. As of 2015 some black students normally assigned to Cleveland High chose to enroll in East Side High because at East Side they had a better chance of joining sports teams and other extra curricular activities with limited spaces. Some black parents sent their children to East Side because they feared they would not be treated well at Cleveland High. Some white students took select Advanced Placement (AP) courses at East Side High, but did not enroll there.

Litigation in the district's desegregation suit, first started in 1965, was still pending, so consolidation with Cleveland High School was still a possibility. The president of the district's school board, a black man named Maurice Lucas, stated in 2015 that he believed some black members of the Cleveland community would oppose consolidating the schools since they were alumni of East Side High and do not want to see it disestablished.

In May 2016 the U.S. District Court for the Northern District of Mississippi ordered the school district to consolidate the schools in order to achieve racial integration. This meant East Side consolidated with Cleveland High, which as of that year was 47% black and 45% white. The former Cleveland High School will house all high school students, while the former East Side High School will house all middle school students.

The final high school graduation ceremony was held in 2017.

== Programs ==
As of 2015 the district lawyers stated that school offered two workshops for preparing for the ACT test. Muave Sanders, a 12th grade (senior) student who is black and who was a plaintiff against the school district in a desegregation lawsuit, stated that he did not receive ACT test preparation.

== Campus ==
As of 2016 the school did not have lockers. The school did have a weight room. Sanders stated that the weight room in Cleveland High "makes ours look like a baby weight room."

== Culture ==
At every graduation, members of the graduating class from 50 years prior attended to see a new generation graduate.
