= WZYQ =

Simulcasts KZYQ, Eudora, Arkansas
- Mound Bayou, Mississippi; United States
- Broadcast area: Cleveland, Mississippi; Shelby, Mississippi
- Frequency: 101.7 MHz
- Branding: Star 101

Programming
- Format: Urban adult contemporary
- Affiliations: Compass Media Networks

Ownership
- Owner: Delta Radio Network; (Fenty L. Fuss)
- Sister stations: KZYQ; WBYB; WKXY; WNLA-FM

History
- First air date: October 10, 1997
- Former frequencies: 101.9 MHz

Technical information
- Licensing authority: FCC
- Facility ID: 191535
- Class: A
- ERP: 2,000 watts
- HAAT: 81 meters (266 ft)
- Transmitter coordinates: 33°52′49.4″N 90°42′24.4″W

Links
- Public license information: Public file; LMS
- Webcast: Listen live
- Website: deltaradio.net/stations/star101

WZYQ (101.7 FM) is an urban adult contemporary formatted broadcast radio station. The station is licensed to Mound Bayou, Mississippi, United States, and serves Cleveland and Shelby in Mississippi. WZYQ is licensed to Fenty L. Fuss and operated by Delta Radio Network.

== History ==
WZYQ signed on on 101.9 MHz, on a separate license, on October 10, 1997.

In June 2006, the station's owner, Jerry D. Russell, suffered a stroke. The station was being operated by another broadcaster, Hodges Broadcasting LLC, under a local marketing agreement but that operator was unable to obtain the financing to purchase the station. With Hodges gone and Russell unable to operate the station himself, WZYQ went off the air for good in early 2007. In a February 2011 letter to the FCC, the owner indicated that he was surrendering the station's broadcast license as well as the licenses for ten sister stations in similar dire circumstances. On May 2, 2011, the station's license was cancelled and the WZYQ call sign assignment was deleted permanently from the FCC database.

In 2015, Fuss won at auction a new construction permit for the Mound Bayou allocation—now moved to 101.7 MHz. The new station took the same callsign as the old one and went on air in July, initially simulcasting WIQQ (102.1 FM).
