= Cleveland, Mississippi =

- City
- Aerial view (2026)
- Motto: A Different Kind of Delta
- Location of Cleveland, Mississippi

- Location in the United States
- Coordinates: 33°44′32″N 90°44′30″W
- Country: United States
- State: Mississippi
- County: Bolivar

Government
  - Mayor: Paul Janoush (D)

Area
  - Total: 7.58 sq mi (19.63 km^{2})
  - Land: 7.58 sq mi (19.63 km^{2})
  - Water: 0 sq mi (0.00 km^{2})
- Elevation: 135 ft (41 m)

Population (2020)
  - Total: 11,199
  - Density: 1,477.9/sq mi (570.63/km^{2})
- Time zone: UTC−6 (Central (CST))
  - Summer (DST): UTC−5 (CDT)
- ZIP codes: 38732-38733
- Area code: 662
- FIPS code: 28-14260
- GNIS feature ID: 2404072
- Website: City Website

Cleveland is a city and one of two county seats of Bolivar County, Mississippi, United States, the other seat being Rosedale. The Cleveland population was 11,199 as of the 2020 United States census.

Cleveland has a large commercial economy, with numerous restaurants, stores, and services along U.S. 61. Delta State University and The Grammy Museum Mississippi, the first Grammy Museum outside of Los Angeles, are located here.

== History ==
Named after President Grover Cleveland, the town began formation in 1869 as people moved inland from the Mississippi River. The Louisville, New Orleans & Texas Railroad ran through the town and a portion of the railroad remains there today. Early records show the community was called Fontaine in 1884 and at some point Coleman's Station. Moses W. Coleman built the first home on the bayou in the area. In 1885, it was officially named Sims after Rueben T. Sims, who owned part of the land on which the town stood. The village of Cleveland was chartered on March 25, 1886, and the United States Post Office recognized the town as such on August 5, 1887. It was Sims's son, B.C. Sims, who was responsible for the name change to Cleveland.

The town grew steadily and by 1901 Cleveland was named the second county seat and a new courthouse was erected. Bolivar County is one of ten counties in Mississippi with two judicial districts.

As more trees were cleared, more land was put into cultivation. In the early days, all of the planting and harvesting was done by hand. At the end of WWI, African Americans left Bolivar County in great numbers, but many stayed, becoming tenant farmers. There was an increasing demand for labor and Delta planters began to recruit overseas. Today, in addition to the first settlers of English, Scottish, Italian, German, Irish, and African descent, Bolivar County is its own “melting pot” of ethnicities.

The African-American influence in Cleveland's history is quite evident. Nearby Dockery Plantation is designated with a Mississippi Blues Trail marker declaring the location as the probable “Birthplace of the Blues.” Many of the early Delta Bluesmen lived and worked around Dockery, influencing each other and educating the next generation.

In the early 1920s, as the State Legislature considered a location for a new Normal college, Cleveland became the obvious choice due to its central Delta location, the railroad, and the donation of land. However, perhaps the most important factor in the equation was the City leaders’ willingness to relocate the infamous Black Bear Saloon that was located between the depot and the soon-to-be Delta Normal College, now Delta State University. In the early 1950s city leaders were able to attract Baxter Laboratories and Mississippi Power & Light’s Delta Steam Electric Station just north of town. The population of Cleveland basically doubled over the following decade.

In 1967, Senators Robert F. Kennedy and Joseph S. Clark Jr. began Senate hearings to assess the effectiveness of the War on Poverty programs. The first field hearings were held in Jackson, Mississippi, and the following day Kennedy and Clark set out to visit "pockets of poverty" in the Mississippi Delta. They arrived in Cleveland, along with Marian Wright and Peter Edelman, for a tour conducted by Amzie Moore. There they observed barefoot, underfed African-American children in tattered clothing, with vacant expressions and distended bellies. Kennedy told Edelman that he thought he had seen the worst poverty in the nation in West Virginia, but it paled in comparison to the poverty he observed in Cleveland.

On May 13th, 2024, the partnership between Cleveland's Bolivar County & Delta State University (DSU) was officially authorized under Mississippi law.

The Grammy Museum Mississippi opened in 2016, subsequent educational & community initiatives further enriched its impact. During its planning stage, the Museum was described as the most technologically advanced music-themed museum in the world; however this was a planned vision using unverified promotional claims. The Grammy Museum is adjacent to Delta State's campus.

The City of Cleveland and Bolivar County partnered with Delta State University (DSU), helping bring to fruition the Grammy Museum adjacent to Delta State’s campus. It stands as one of the most technologically advanced music museums in the world.

Cleveland is also home to the Railroad Heritage Museum, housing the largest O gauge model layout in the southeast, thousands of railroad artifacts, and a 1941 Illinois Central caboose, all paying tribute to Cleveland's railroad beginnings. The Mississippi Delta Chinese Heritage Museum is located on the third floor of the Delta State Archives & Museum. The Boo Ferriss Baseball Museum, located beside the DSU baseball stadium, honors the late Red Sox pitcher and Hall of Famer, Boo Ferriss, a Shaw, Miss. native and legendary coach at DSU. The Amzie Moore House is the actual home of the late Civil Rights leader, which has been preserved and converted into a museum, paying tribute to his efforts. The home has also been designated as a stop on the Mississippi Freedom Trail.

== Geography ==
Cleveland, Mississippi

Climate chart (precipitation, max. and min. temperature)
J	F	M	A	M	J	J	A	S	O	N	D
5.7 51 33	5.4 56 36	5.4 66 44	6 75 52	5.7 83 62	5.1 90 70	3.7 92 72	3.5 93 72	3.9 88 65	4.9 77 53	4.2 64 42	5.8 54 36
- █ Average max. and min. temperatures in °F
- █ Precipitation totals in inches
Metric conversion
J	F	M	A	M	J	J	A	S	O	N	D
145 11 1	137 13 2	137 19 7	152 24 11	145 28 17	130 32 21	94 33 22	89 34 22	99 31 18	124 25 12	107 18 6	147 12 2
- █ Average max. and min. temperatures in °C
- █ Precipitation totals in mm

Cleveland is located 19 mi (31 km) southeast of Rosedale and the Mississippi River along Mississippi Highway 8. U.S. Route 61 (N-S) and route 8 (E-W) are the main highways serving Cleveland. Jones Bayou and the old Illinois Central Railroad pass through the city from south to north.

According to the United States Census Bureau, the city has a total area of 7.58 square miles (19.6 km^{2}), all land.

=== Climate ===
Cleveland has a humid subtropical climate (Köppen Cfa) with long, hot summers and short, mild winters.

Climate data for Cleveland, Mississippi (1991–2020 normals, extremes 1901–present)
Month	Jan	Feb	Mar	Apr	May	Jun	Jul	Aug	Sep	Oct	Nov	Dec	Year
Record high °F (°C)	81 (27)	88 (31)	98 (37)	95 (35)	100 (38)	106 (41)	108 (42)	110 (43)	107 (42)	100 (38)	90 (32)	82 (28)	110 (43)
Mean maximum °F (°C)	71.6 (22.0)	75.1 (23.9)	81.0 (27.2)	86.3 (30.2)	92.1 (33.4)	96.1 (35.6)	98.1 (36.7)	98.9 (37.2)	96.6 (35.9)	90.7 (32.6)	81.1 (27.3)	73.5 (23.1)	100.0 (37.8)
Mean daily maximum °F (°C)	51.3 (10.7)	56.2 (13.4)	65.5 (18.6)	74.6 (23.7)	83.1 (28.4)	89.6 (32.0)	92.0 (33.3)	93.1 (33.9)	87.7 (30.9)	77.0 (25.0)	63.7 (17.6)	54.1 (12.3)	74.0 (23.3)
Daily mean °F (°C)	42.3 (5.7)	46.2 (7.9)	54.6 (12.6)	63.5 (17.5)	72.6 (22.6)	79.5 (26.4)	82.1 (27.8)	82.3 (27.9)	76.3 (24.6)	65.2 (18.4)	52.9 (11.6)	45.2 (7.3)	63.6 (17.5)
Mean daily minimum °F (°C)	33.2 (0.7)	36.3 (2.4)	43.7 (6.5)	52.4 (11.3)	62.1 (16.7)	69.5 (20.8)	72.3 (22.4)	71.6 (22.0)	64.9 (18.3)	53.3 (11.8)	42.1 (5.6)	36.2 (2.3)	53.1 (11.7)
Mean minimum °F (°C)	18.3 (−7.6)	22.6 (−5.2)	28.1 (−2.2)	37.1 (2.8)	48.2 (9.0)	60.5 (15.8)	65.2 (18.4)	63.0 (17.2)	50.2 (10.1)	36.9 (2.7)	27.3 (−2.6)	23.3 (−4.8)	15.3 (−9.3)
Record low °F (°C)	−6 (−21)	−6 (−21)	17 (−8)	27 (−3)	38 (3)	46 (8)	54 (12)	51 (11)	37 (3)	25 (−4)	13 (−11)	0 (−18)	−6 (−21)
Average precipitation inches (mm)	5.68 (144)	5.35 (136)	5.41 (137)	6.01 (153)	5.69 (145)	5.06 (129)	3.65 (93)	3.52 (89)	3.94 (100)	4.92 (125)	4.24 (108)	5.82 (148)	59.29 (1,506)
Average snowfall inches (cm)	0.6 (1.5)	0.8 (2.0)	0.5 (1.3)	0.0 (0.0)	0.0 (0.0)	0.0 (0.0)	0.0 (0.0)	0.0 (0.0)	0.0 (0.0)	0.0 (0.0)	0.0 (0.0)	0.0 (0.0)	1.9 (4.8)
Average precipitation days (≥ 0.01 in)	11.8	11.8	11.3	11.1	9.9	8.1	8.8	8.5	7.1	8.1	8.0	11.8	116.3
Average snowy days (≥ 0.1 in)	0.3	0.4	0.1	0.0	0.0	0.0	0.0	0.0	0.0	0.0	0.1	0.1	1
Source: NOAA IEM

== Demographics ==
Historical population
Census	Pop.	Note	%±
1900	479		—
1910	1,001		109.0%
1920	1,674		67.2%
1930	3,240		93.5%
1940	4,189		29.3%
1950	6,747		61.1%
1960	10,172		50.8%
1970	13,327		31.0%
1980	14,524		9.0%
1990	15,384		5.9%
2000	13,841		−10.0%
2010	12,334		−10.9%
2020	11,199		−9.2%
U.S. Decennial Census

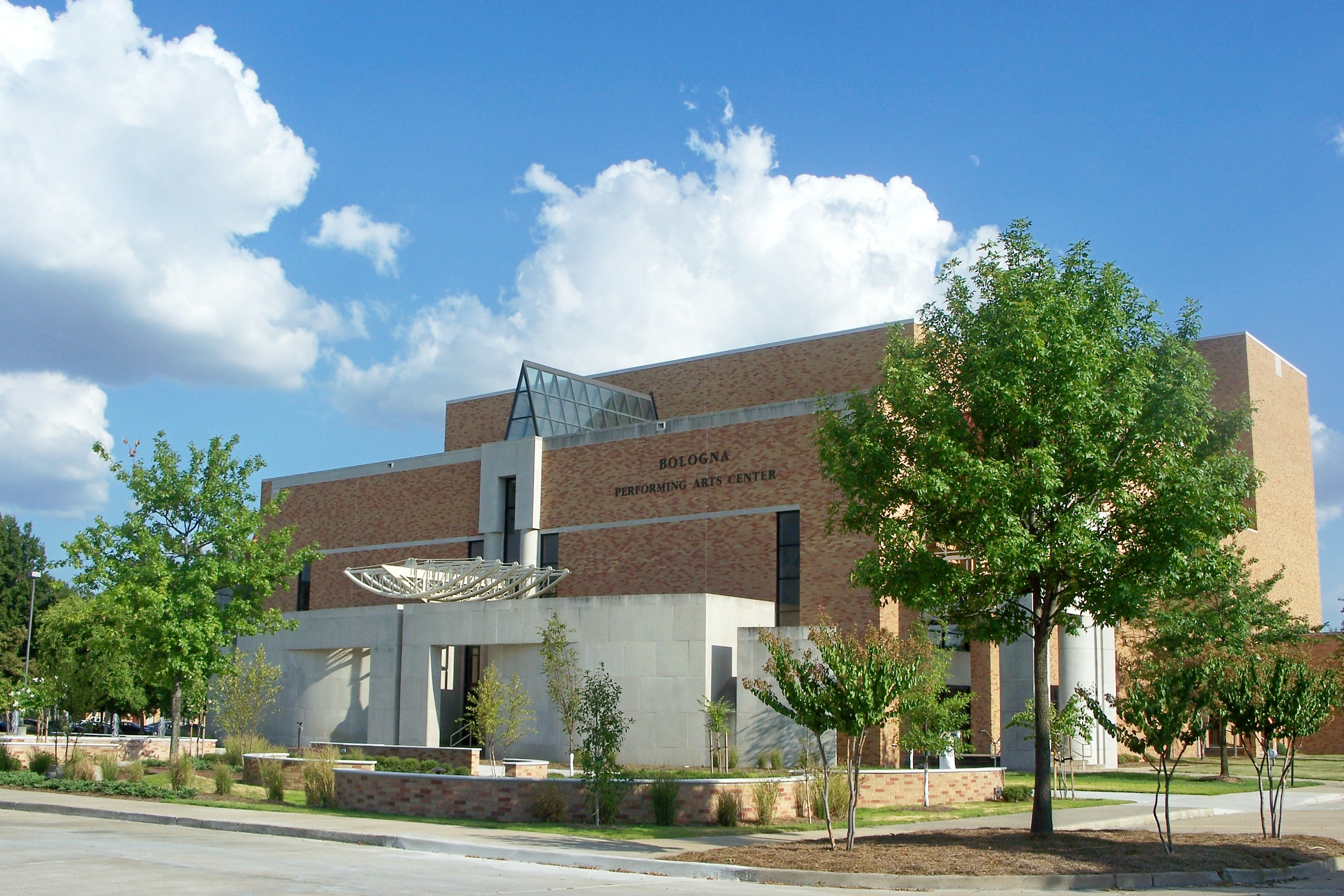
Bologna Performing Arts Center in Cleveland, Mississippi

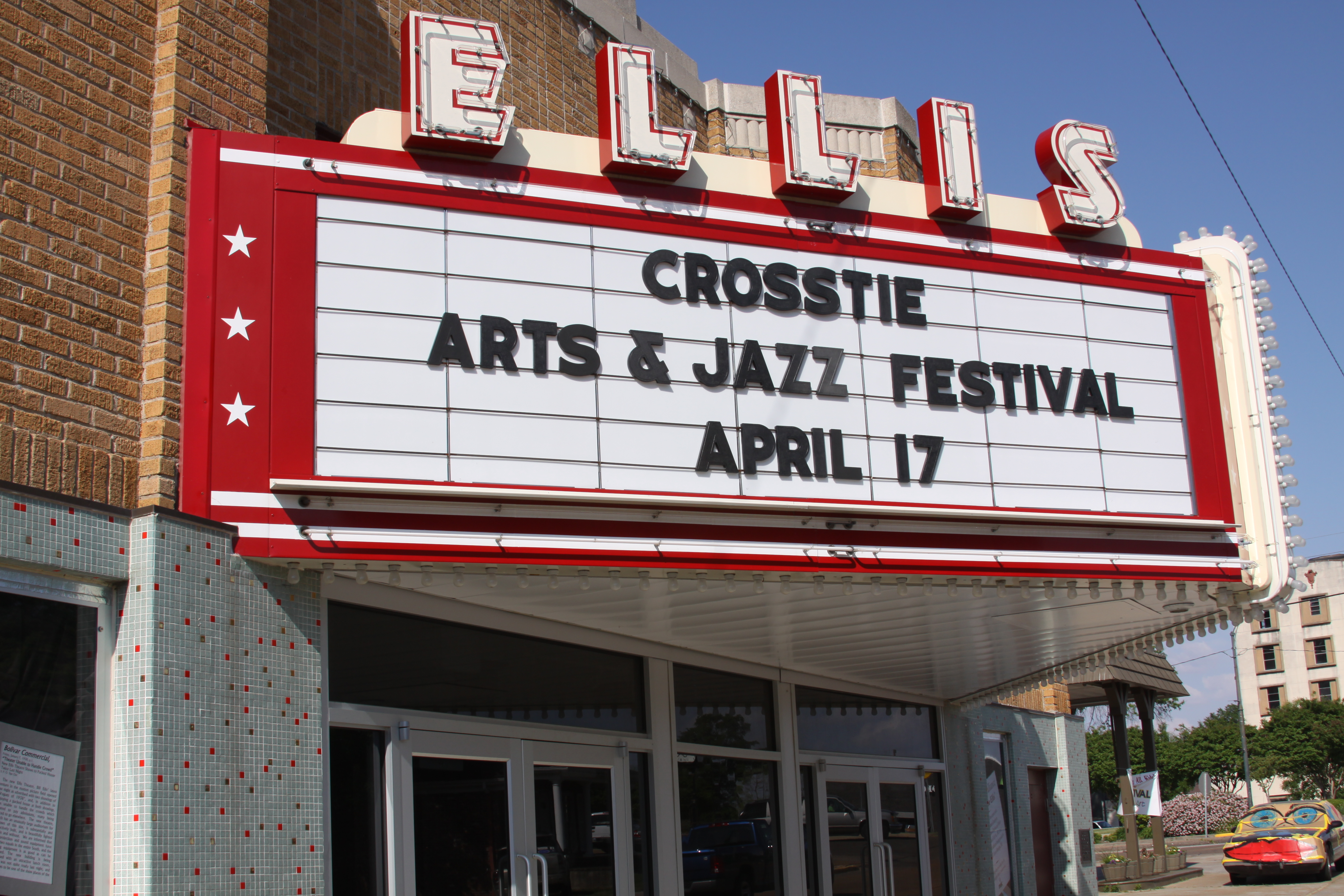
Ellis Theater in Cleveland

=== Racial and ethnic composition ===
Cleveland city, Mississippi – Racial and ethnic composition Note: the US Census treats Hispanic/Latino as an ethnic category. This table excludes Latinos from the racial categories and assigns them to a separate category. Hispanics/Latinos may be of any race.
Race / Ethnicity (NH = Non-Hispanic)	Pop 2000	Pop 2010	Pop 2020	% 2000	% 2010	% 2020
White alone (NH)	6,858	5,768	4,887	49.55%	46.77%	43.64%
Black or African American alone (NH)	6,643	6,159	5,519	48.00%	49.94%	49.28%
Native American or Alaska Native alone (NH)	16	5	5	0.12%	0.04%	0.04%
Asian alone (NH)	136	117	188	0.98%	0.95%	1.68%
Native Hawaiian or Pacific Islander alone (NH)	1	10	0	0.01%	0.08%	0.00%
Other race alone (NH)	2	8	26	0.01%	0.06%	0.23%
Mixed race or Multiracial (NH)	55	80	290	0.40%	0.65%	2.59%
Hispanic or Latino (any race)	130	187	284	0.94%	1.52%	2.54%
Total	13,841	12,334	11,199	100.00%	100.00%	100.00%

=== 2020 census ===
As of the 2020 census, Cleveland had a population of 11,199 and 2,611 families. The median age was 35.4 years. 22.6% of residents were under the age of 18 and 17.2% of residents were 65 years of age or older. For every 100 females there were 86.0 males, and for every 100 females age 18 and over there were 80.9 males age 18 and over.

98.2% of residents lived in urban areas, while 1.8% lived in rural areas.

There were 4,406 households in Cleveland, of which 29.5% had children under the age of 18 living in them. Of all households, 34.1% were married-couple households, 20.0% were households with a male householder and no spouse or partner present, and 40.7% were households with a female householder and no spouse or partner present. About 32.0% of all households were made up of individuals and 12.5% had someone living alone who was 65 years of age or older.

There were 5,109 housing units, of which 13.8% were vacant. The homeowner vacancy rate was 2.0% and the rental vacancy rate was 12.6%.

Racial composition as of the 2020 census
Race	Number	Percent
White	4,921	43.9%
Black or African American	5,541	49.5%
American Indian and Alaska Native	7	0.1%
Asian	188	1.7%
Native Hawaiian and Other Pacific Islander	0	0.0%
Some other race	180	1.6%
Two or more races	362	3.2%

== Arts and culture ==
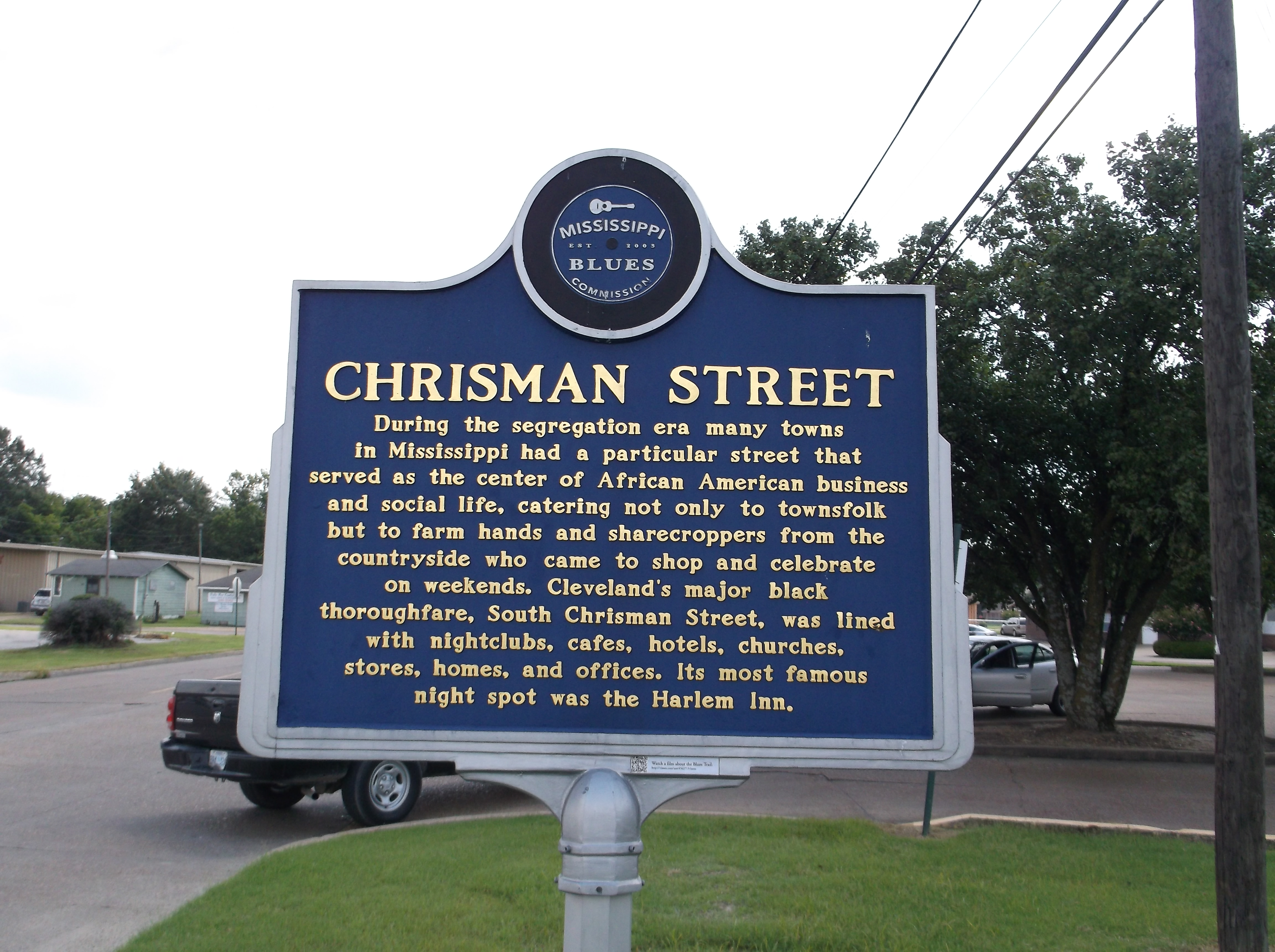
Chrisman Street Mississippi Blues Trail Marker

=== Mississippi Blues Trail ===
Four Mississippi Blues Trail markers are located in Cleveland. The first marker recognizes Chrisman Street, which once served as the center of African-American business and social life in Cleveland. The second marker celebrates blues musician W. C. Handy. The third marker is located at the Grammy Museum Mississippi. The fourth marker recognizes Rev. C.L. Franklin, who preached at St. Peter's Rock M.B. Church here, influenced gospel, R&B and blues artists, and his daughters Aretha, Erma and Carolyn became noted soul singers after starting out singing in church.

== Education ==
=== Colleges and universities ===
- Delta State University

Bolivar County residents have residency for two community colleges: Coahoma Community College and Mississippi Delta Community College. Their main campuses respectively are in unincorporated Coahoma County and Moorhead in Sunflower County.

=== Primary and secondary schools ===
The City of Cleveland is served by the Cleveland School District. Schools within the Cleveland city limits include:

- Cleveland Central High School – Formed in mid-2017 by the consolidation of Cleveland High School and East Side High School, occupying the former Cleveland High School and Margaret Green Junior High School.
- Cleveland Central Middle School – Formed in mid-2017 by the consolidation of D.M. Smith Middle School and Margaret Green Junior High School, located at the former East Side High School campus.

Elementary schools

- Nailor Elementary School
- Cypress Parks Elementary School
- Pearman Elementary School
- Parks Elementary School
- D. M. Smith Elementary

Other:

- Alternative School
- Cleveland Voc Tech Complex

Private schools

- K-12: Bayou Academy
- K-6: Presbyterian Day School

Previously ethnic Chinese students were required to attend separate schools, something that persisted into the 1940s. The Chinese Mission School educated them. This building was demolished in 2003.

== Media ==
=== Newspapers ===
- The Bolivar Bullet
- The Bolivar Commercial (Defunct)
- The Cleveland News Leader (Defunct)
- The Cleveland Current (Defunct)

=== Television ===
- Channel 8, WHCQ-LD
- Channel 17, WXVT-LD

=== FM radio ===
- 88.1 WDSW-LP: (Cleveland, Delta State University) Adult Album Alternative|Americana (music)|Blues
- 92.1 WKXY: Country
- 98.3 WBYB (FM): Oldies
- 101.7 WZYQ: Adult R&B

== Infrastructure ==
=== Police services ===
The city of Cleveland is served and protected by the Cleveland Police Department and is located on South Sharpe Avenue. Currently, 45 people are employed by the department. Of the 45, 39 are sworn police officers and six civilians serve in a support role. Sworn officers average out to one officer per 357 citizens.

=== Fire services ===
The Cleveland Volunteer Fire Department is currently rated Class 4 by the State Rating Bureau and has three paid employees and 37 volunteer fire fighters. The paid employees include a Fire Inspector, Maintenance Engineer and Maintenance Assistant. All other positions are volunteer. The department operates from three separate fire stations, including a new station at the Cleveland Municipal Airport that opened in late 2011 and utilizes four front line pumpers, two rescue/utility vehicles, an aerial platform pumper, an airport/crash rescue truck, one Ford F-2500 with a bed mounted deluge gun, a Hazardous Materials Response Unit and one backup pumper for its daily operations. The department also operates a training facility that is home to a rope rescue tower, smoke house, ventilation simulator, confined space maze, drafting pit, and a Class A burn facility.

=== Health care ===
Bolivar Medical Center is a hospital in Cleveland with emergency services.

=== Transportation ===
Delta Bus Lines provides regional scheduled services to Baton Rouge, Memphis, Greenville, Jackson, and other cities in the Mississippi Delta region.

== Notable people ==
- Bobby Bradford – jazz trumpeter, cornetist, bandleader, and composer
- Amzie Moore – Civil rights activist
- Walter Rhodes – blues accordionist and singer
- Bobbie L. Steele – 32nd president of Chicago's Cook County Board of Commissioners
- Larry Speakes – acting spokesman for the White House under President Ronald Reagan
- Professional baseball players:
  - Dave Ferriss
  - Josh Hancock
  - Chet "Chick" Morgan
  - Kevin Rogers
- Professional football players:
  - Pat Coleman
  - John Eubanks
  - Ken Lucas
  - Lou Rash
  - Floyd Womack
- Johnny O'Bryant III – professional basketball player
- Margaret Wade – Basketball Hall of Fame Coach, namesake of the Wade Trophy
