= WNLA-FM =

- Drew, Mississippi; United States
- Broadcast area: Northern and Central Sunflower County, Mississippi
- Frequency: 95.3 MHz
- Branding: Oldies 98.3

Programming
- Format: Oldies
- Affiliations: Fox News Radio

Ownership
- Owner: Delta Radio Network; (Fenty L. Fuss)
- Sister stations: KZYQ, WBYB, WKXY, WZYQ

History
- First air date: 2015
- Former call signs: WDTL (2015–2016); WNOU (2016–2021)

Technical information
- Licensing authority: FCC
- Facility ID: 191534
- Class: C3
- ERP: 500 watts
- HAAT: 13 meters (43 ft)
- Transmitter coordinates: 33°49′2.40″N 90°31′23.30″W
- Repeater: 98.3 WBYB (Cleveland)

Links
- Public license information: Public file; LMS
- Webcast: Listen live
- Website: deltaradio.net/stations/oldies983

WNLA-FM (95.3 FM) is an oldies formatted broadcast radio station. The station is licensed to Drew, Mississippi and serves Drew and Northern and Central Sunflower County in Mississippi. WNLA-FM is licensed to Fenty L. Fuss and is operated by Delta Radio Network.
