= Sunflower County Consolidated School District =

School district in Mississippi

Address
- 196 Martin Luther King Drive Indianola, Mississippi, 38751; United States

District information
- Type: Public
- Grades: PreK–12
- NCES District ID: 2800187

Students and staff
- Students: 3,149
- Teachers: 242.2
- Staff: 281.13
- Student–teacher ratio: 13.0

Other information
- Website: www.sunflower.k12.ms.us

The Sunflower County Consolidated School District (SCCSD), formerly the Sunflower County School District (SCSD), is a public school district with its headquarters in Indianola, Mississippi in the Mississippi Delta. The district serves all of Sunflower County.

Prior to the merger with the Indianola School District, the SCSD served much of the county, including the cities of Ruleville and Moorhead, the towns of Sunflower, Inverness, and Doddsville as well as the Sunflower County portion of Shaw. As of July 1, 2012, the Drew School District and Indianola School District were consolidated into the Sunflower County district. The former Drew school district's attendance boundary included Drew, Rome, and the employee residences of the Mississippi State Penitentiary (MSP, Parchman), located in an unincorporated area. The current school district was created in 2014.

== History ==
In 1968 the district had 4,100 "colored" students and about 1,000 white students. At that time the district had a "freedom of choice" system. During that year, the superintendent of the school system stated his opposition to a proposed rapid integration, arguing that doing so would cause white people to leave the school district. During that year, a local branch of the National Association for the Advancement of Colored People (NAACP) asked the district to replace two school principals because the branch believed that they were not qualified educationally and mentally. The district said that it would consider the matter.

In 1986 a petition to merge the Drew School District with the Sunflower County district circulated.

In 2002 two of the district's schools had no licensed librarians. During that year a Mississippi state commission said that the district had violated accreditation standards in 2001 by not having those librarians. In 2003 the district had faced a budget deficit for the third time in a row. Judy Rhodes, the executive assistant to the state superintendent of education, said in a Board of Education meeting in Jackson, Mississippi said that "Of all the districts we're working with right now, Sunflower is the one with the most serious situation."

In 2010 State of Mississippi officials said that the management of the district should be taken over by the state government because of the existence of allegations of sexual misconduct and misuse of federal funds. On April 19, 2010, the Mississippi Department of Education took control of the school district.

In February 2012 the Mississippi Senate voted 43–4 to pass Senate Bill 2330, to consolidate the Sunflower County School District, the Drew School District, and the Indianola School District into one school district. The bill went to the Mississippi House of Representatives. Later that month, the State Board of Education approved the consolidation of the Drew School District and the Sunflower County School District, and when Senate Bill 2330 was approved, Indianola School District was added. In May 2012 Governor of Mississippi Phil Bryant signed the bill into law, requiring all three districts to consolidate. SB2330 stipulates that if a county has three school districts all under conservatorship by the Mississippi Department of Education, they will be consolidated into one school district serving the entire county.

== Schools ==
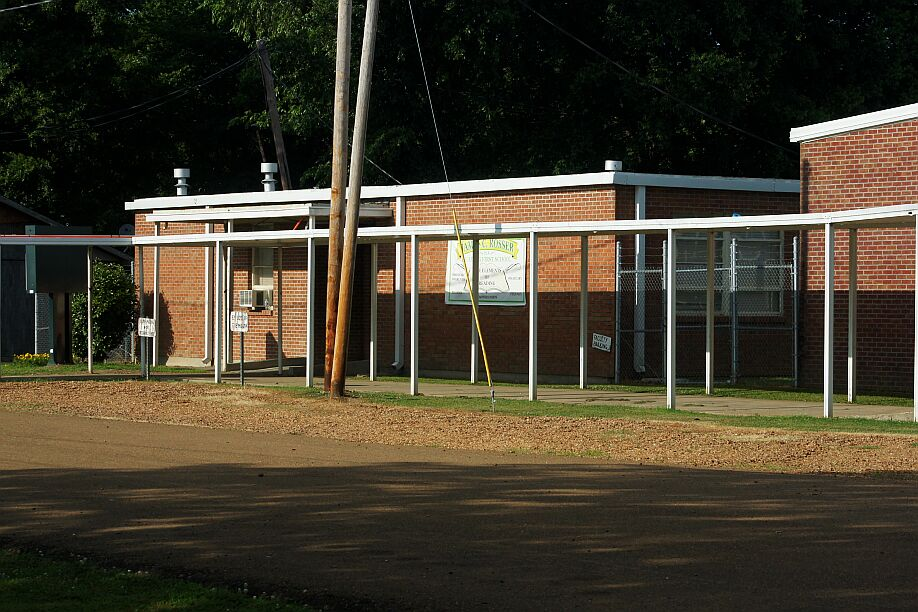
James C. Rosser Elementary School

Schools in the district include:

High schools:

- Thomas E. Edwards, Sr. High School (formerly Ruleville Central High School) (Grades 9-12; Ruleville)
- Gentry High School (Grades 10–12; Indianola)

K-8 schools:

- Moorhead Central School (Grades 6–8; Moorhead) - Formerly Moorhead Middle School, renamed and converted into a K-8 in 2018

Middle schools:

- Drew Hunter Middle School (Grades 6–8; Drew)
- Robert L. Merritt Junior High School (Indianola)
- Ruleville Middle School (Grades 6–8; Ruleville)

Elementary schools:

- Carver Lower Elementary School (Indianola)
- A. W. James Elementary School (Grades K-5; Drew)
- Lockard Elementary School (Indianola)
- Ruleville Central Elementary School (Grades K-5; Ruleville)

Pre-Kindergarten

- James C. Rosser Early Learning Center (Moorhead), formerly Rosser Elementary School (Grades K-5)

Alternative schools:

- Indianola Career and Technical Center
- Indianola Academic Achievement Center (IAAC) (Indianola) - K-12

As a result of the 2012 merger with Drew School District, A. W. James Elementary School and the Drew Hunter High School became a part of the district. The high school division of Drew Hunter closed, with high school students rezoned to Ruleville Central. The secondary school is now named Drew Hunter Middle School with grades 6–8. As of 2014 Indianola schools are now a part of the new district.

=== Former schools ===
- East Sunflower Elementary School (Grades K-5; Sunflower) - Closed in 2022
- Inverness School (Grades K-8; Inverness) - Closed in 2022

== District offices ==
Currently its headquarters are in the Main Central Office in Indianola and it has a separate North Office in Drew. The North Office is the former Drew School District headquarters.

Previously its headquarters were in the Sunflower County Courthouse in Indianola, and it had the educational services building along U.S. Route 49 West in Indianola.

== Demographics ==
As of 2017 the SCCSD had 4,200 students and 120 teachers.

In comparison, in 1987 the pre-consolidation SCSD district had 2,600 students.

=== 2006-07 school year ===
There were a total of 1,792 students enrolled in the Sunflower County School District during the 2006–2007 school year. The gender makeup of the district was 49% female and 51% male. The racial makeup of the district was 95.42% African American, 2.29% White, 2.06% Hispanic, and 0.22% Asian. 89.6% of the district's students were eligible to receive free lunch.

=== Previous school years ===
School Year	Enrollment	Gender Makeup		Racial Makeup				
School Year	Enrollment	Female	Male	Asian	African American	Hispanic	Native American	White
2005-06	1,855	49%	51%	–	96.06%	1.51%	–	2.43%
2004-05	1,813	50%	50%	0.06%	96.08%	1.60%	–	2.26%
2003-04	1,915	48%	52%	0.05%	96.08%	1.46%	–	2.40%
2002-03	1,922	49%	51%	–	96.36%	1.87%	–	1.77%

== Accountability statistics ==
	2006-07	2005-06	2004-05	2003-04	2002-03
District Accreditation Status	Accredited	Accredited	Probation	Probation	Probation
School Performance Classifications
Level 5 (Superior Performing) Schools	0	0	0	0	0
Level 4 (Exemplary) Schools	1	1	1	3	1
Level 3 (Successful) Schools	5	5	5	4	4
Level 2 (Under Performing) Schools	1	1	1	0	1
Level 1 (Low Performing) Schools	0	0	0	0	1
Not Assigned	0	0	0	0	0

== School uniforms ==
All students in the district are required to wear school uniforms.

== See also ==
- List of school districts in Mississippi
- Indianola Academy
- North Sunflower Academy
- Central Delta Academy
- Education segregation in the Mississippi Delta
