= Malcolm Norwood =

Malcolm Norwood may refer to:

- Malcolm Norwood (artist)
- Malcolm Norwood (runner)
