= Doddsville, Mississippi =

- Town
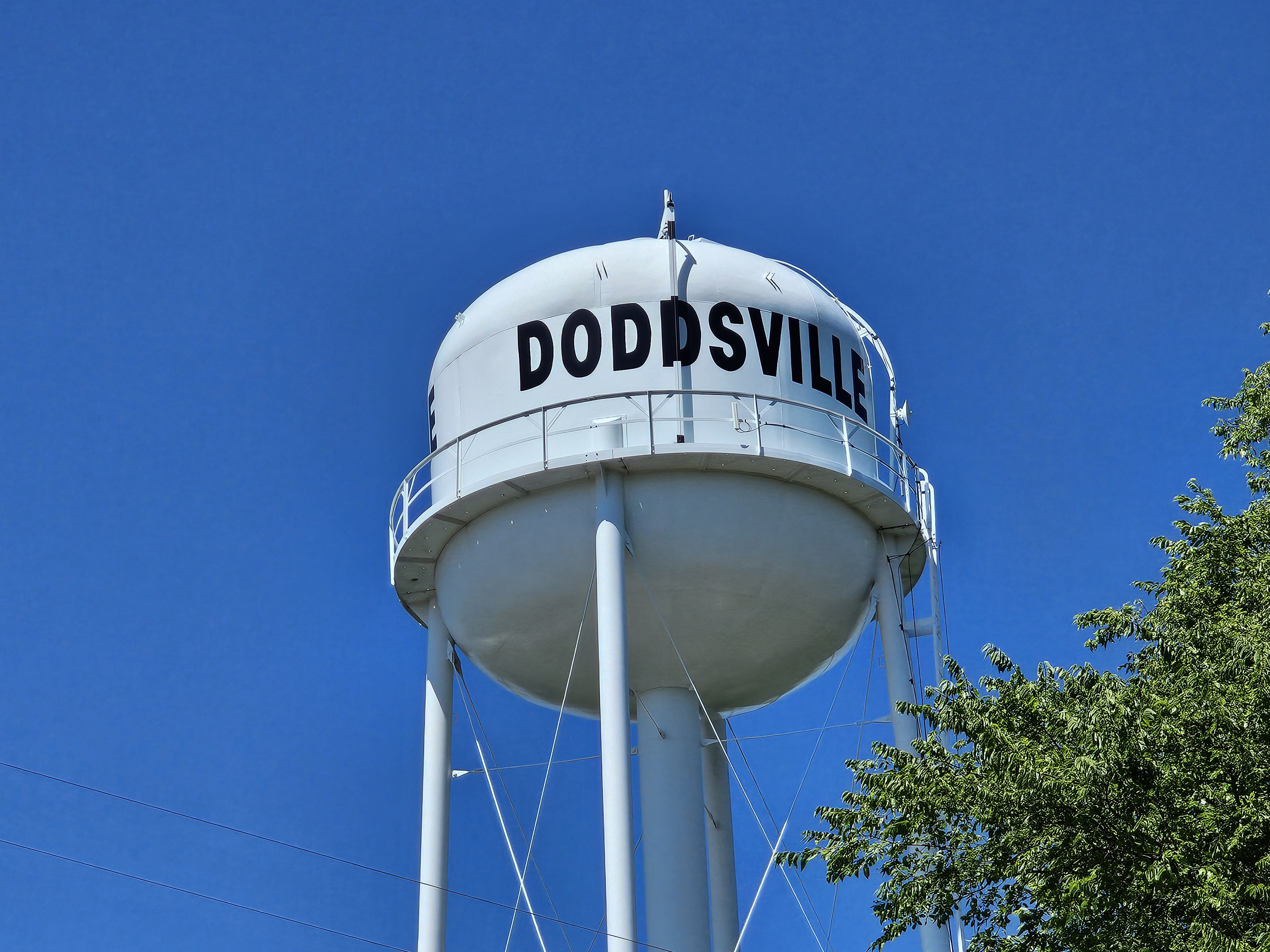
- Water tower in Doddsville

- Location of Doddsville, Mississippi

- Location in the United States
- Coordinates: 33°39′36″N 90°31′17″W
- Country: United States
- State: Mississippi
- County: Sunflower

Area
  - Total: 0.77 sq mi (1.99 km^{2})
  - Land: 0.77 sq mi (1.99 km^{2})
  - Water: 0 sq mi (0.00 km^{2})
- Elevation: 125 ft (38 m)

Population (2020)
  - Total: 69
  - Density: 90.0/sq mi (34.75/km^{2})
- Time zone: UTC-6 (Central (CST))
  - Summer (DST): UTC-5 (CDT)
- ZIP code: 38736
- Area code: 662
- FIPS code: 28-19420
- GNIS feature ID: 2406383

Doddsville is a town in Sunflower County, Mississippi. As of the 2020 census, Doddsville had a population of 69. It was established by Daniel Doddsman Sr. in 1889.

== History ==
Daniel Doddsman Sr. and his eldest son, Daniel Jr. were early settlers who hauled logs in the area in 1888, and purchased 107 acres (43 ha) of land where the town now stands in 1891. Oliver Eastland, grandfather of U.S. Senator James Eastland, bought a large tract of land near Doddsville in the 1880s, and his son Woods Eastland used black labor to clear the land to create a 2,300 acres (930 ha) plantation.

A landing called "Standing Stump" existed west of Doddsville on the bank of the Sunflower River. When river levels rose in the spring, boats from Vicksburg would follow the Yazoo River and then Sunflower River as far as Standing Stump, where a post office was located.

When the Yazoo Delta Railroad was completed in 1897, a depot was located in the town and named "Doddsville", after the Dodds brothers. By 1898, Doddsville had five stores, and the Sunflower Lumber Company was founded.

Doddsville was incorporated in 1920, and by 1922 the population was estimated at between 400 and 500. There was a hotel and rooming house, two drug stores with licensed pharmacists, two Chinese groceries, a Café, a dress shop, a school, two churches, a woman’s club, four doctors, and five passenger trains a day. The city hall was located inside the Doddsville Land and Mercantile Company store.

A jail was built in 1952, and a town water system installed in 1963.

== The Holbert lynching incident ==
In 1904, Luther Holbert, an African-American, allegedly shot and killed white plantation owner James Eastland (uncle of future senator James Eastland), after Eastland confronted Holbert in his cabin. Eastland's death gained national attention. Within days, a white mob had captured Holbert and his wife, after which the couple were tortured with oversized corkscrews, had their fingers and ears cut off to distribute to onlookers, and were burned to death while tied to a tree. The Holberts' gruesome murder inspired Bo Carter's 1936 blues hit All Around Man, with its references to "the butcher-man", "screwin", "grindin", and "bore your hole till the auger-man comes".

== Geography ==
According to the United States Census Bureau, the town has a total area of 0.8 square miles (2.1 km^{2}), all land.

== Demographics ==
Historical population
Census	Pop.	Note	%±
1930	317		—
1940	262		−17.4%
1950	201		−23.3%
1960	190		−5.5%
1970	276		45.3%
1980	232		−15.9%
1990	149		−35.8%
2000	108		−27.5%
2010	98		−9.3%
2020	69		−29.6%
U.S. Decennial Census

=== Racial and ethnic composition ===
Doddsville town, Mississippi – Racial and ethnic composition Note: the US Census treats Hispanic/Latino as an ethnic category. This table excludes Latinos from the racial categories and assigns them to a separate category. Hispanics/Latinos may be of any race.
Race / Ethnicity (NH = Non-Hispanic)	Pop 2000	Pop 2010	Pop 2020	% 2000	% 2010	% 2020
White alone (NH)	35	9	7	32.41%	9.18%	10.14%
Black or African American alone (NH)	73	89	61	67.59%	90.82%	88.41%
Native American or Alaska Native alone (NH)	0	0	0	0.00%	0.00%	0.00%
Asian alone (NH)	0	0	0	0.00%	0.00%	0.00%
Native Hawaiian or Pacific Islander alone (NH)	0	0	0	0.00%	0.00%	0.00%
Other race alone (NH)	0	0	0	0.00%	0.00%	0.00%
Mixed race or Multiracial (NH)	0	0	1	0.00%	0.00%	1.45%
Hispanic or Latino (any race)	0	0	0	0.00%	0.00%	0.00%
Total	108	98	69	100.00%	100.00%	100.00%

=== 2020 census ===
As of the 2020 United States census, there were 69 people, 85 households, and 65 families residing in the town.

=== 2010 census ===
As of the 2010 United States census, there were 98 people living in the town. The racial makeup of the town was 90.8% Black and 9.2% White.

=== 2000 census ===
As of the census of 2000, there were 108 people, 38 households, and 22 families living in the town. The population density was 141.0 inhabitants per square mile (54.4/km^{2}). There were 40 housing units at an average density of 52.2 per square mile (20.2/km^{2}). The racial makeup of the town was 67.59% African American and 32.41% White.

There were 38 households, out of which 34.2% had children under the age of 18 living with them, 36.8% were married couples living together, 21.1% had a female householder with no husband present, and 39.5% were non-families. 31.6% of all households were made up of individuals, and 18.4% had someone living alone who was 65 years of age or older. The average household size was 2.84 and the average family size was 3.87.

In the town, the population was spread out, with 32.4% under the age of 18, 5.6% from 18 to 24, 28.7% from 25 to 44, 19.4% from 45 to 64, and 13.9% who were 65 years of age or older. The median age was 32 years. For every 100 females, there were 100.0 males. For every 100 females age 18 and over, there were 82.5 males.

The median income for a household in the town was $19,000, and the median income for a family was $25,250. Males had a median income of $16,250 versus $15,625 for females. The per capita income for the town was $6,359. There were 10.5% of families and 30.7% of the population living below the poverty line, including 38.5% of under eighteens and none of those over 64.

== Education ==
Doddsville is served by the Sunflower County School District. Thomas E. Edwards, Sr. High School (formerly Ruleville Central High School) is the public high school.

North Sunflower Academy is a private school located in Drew.

== Notable people ==
- James Eastland, U.S. Senator from Mississippi.
- C. L. Franklin, Baptist preacher, civil rights activist, and father of Aretha Franklin
- Fruteland Jackson, blues musician.
