= Rome, Mississippi =

Unincorporated community in the US

- Unincorporated community
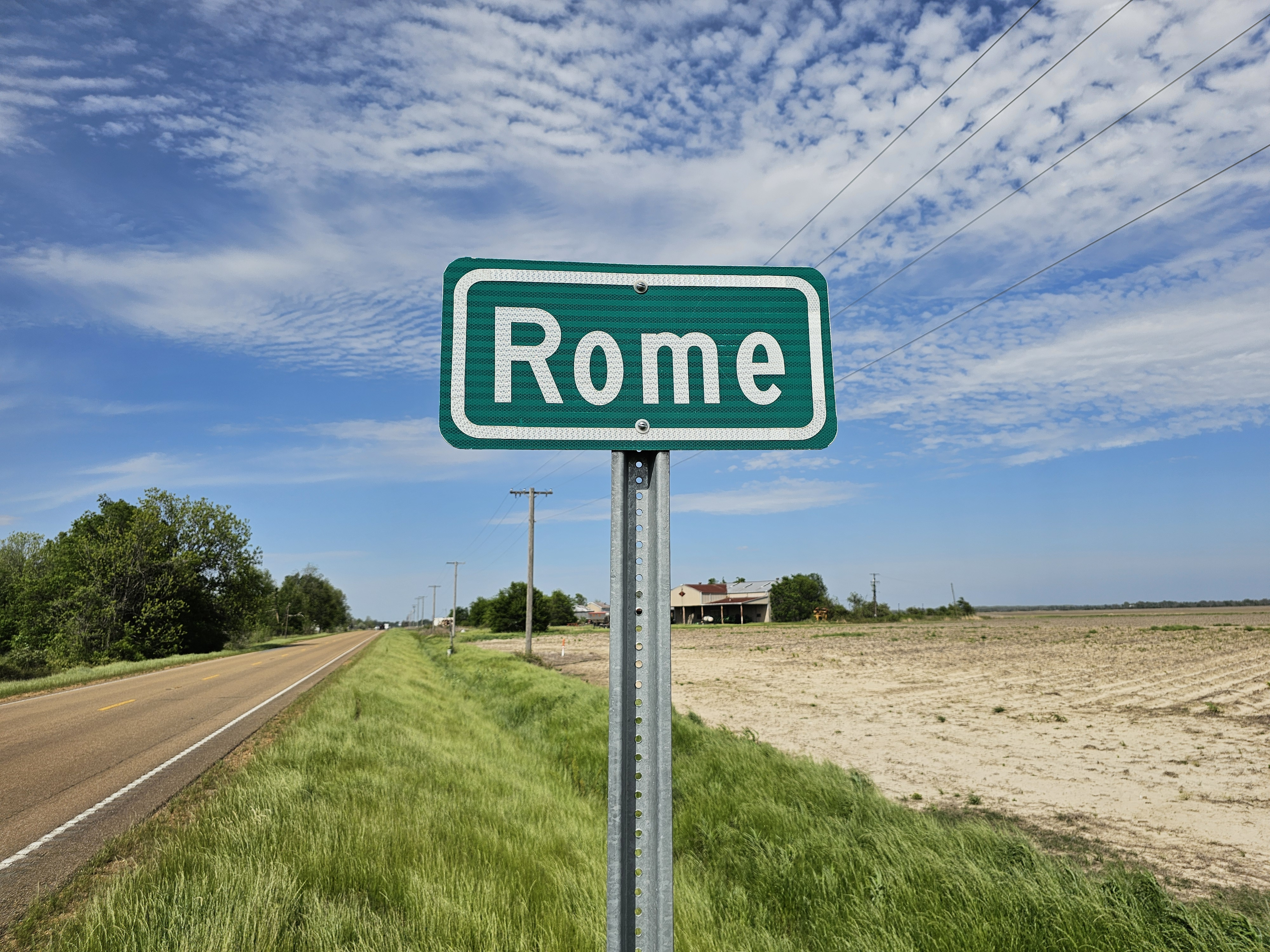
- Highway sign in Rome

- Location within Mississippi Location within the United States
- Coordinates: 33°57′47″N 90°28′42″W
- Country: United States
- State: Mississippi
- County: Sunflower
- Elevation: 148 ft (45 m)
- Time zone: UTC-6 (Central (CST))
  - Summer (DST): UTC-5 (CDT)
- ZIP code: 38768
- Area code: 662
- GNIS feature ID: 676833

Rome is an unincorporated community located in Sunflower County, Mississippi. Rome is approximately 3 miles (4.8 km) north of the Mississippi State Penitentiary (also known as MSP or Parchman) and 5 miles (8.0 km) south of Tutwiler along U.S. Route 49W.

Eric J. Shelton of Mississippi Today described Rome as being "in the Shadow of Parchman".

== Demographics ==
In 2020 Shelton stated that the population was under 200, with most of the people being African-American.

According to Shelton, Parchman employees and former employees who were retired made up many people in Rome.

== Government and infrastructure ==
It is an unincorporated area with no local government. James Gwin, a retiree from MSP who was a transportation director there, stated that several employees of the Mississippi state government were unaware of where Rome was, and that "We don’t have a mayor, so we are sort of like a village because we’re not big enough. So, we get the bad end of the stick."

The United States Postal Service operates the Rome Post Office. In July 2011 the USPS stated that it could possibly close the Rome Post Office.

== Education ==
The City of Drew is served by the Sunflower County Consolidated School District. Elementary school students attend A. W. James Elementary School in Drew and middle school students attend Drew Hunter Middle School in Drew. High school students attend Thomas E. Edwards, Sr. High School (formerly Ruleville Central High School) in Ruleville.

Residents were previously zoned to the Drew School District. Children attended A.W. James Elementary School and Drew Hunter High School in Drew. Prior to the 2010-2011 school year the Drew School District secondary schools were Hunter Middle School and Drew High School. As of July 1, 2012, the Drew School District was consolidated with the Sunflower County School District. Drew Hunter's high school division closed as of that date, with high school students rezoned to Ruleville Central High School.

Mississippi Delta Community College has the Drew Center in Drew. Sunflower County Library System operates the Drew Public Library in Drew.

== Notable people ==
- Aubrey Rozzell, former National Football League linebacker

== Gallery ==
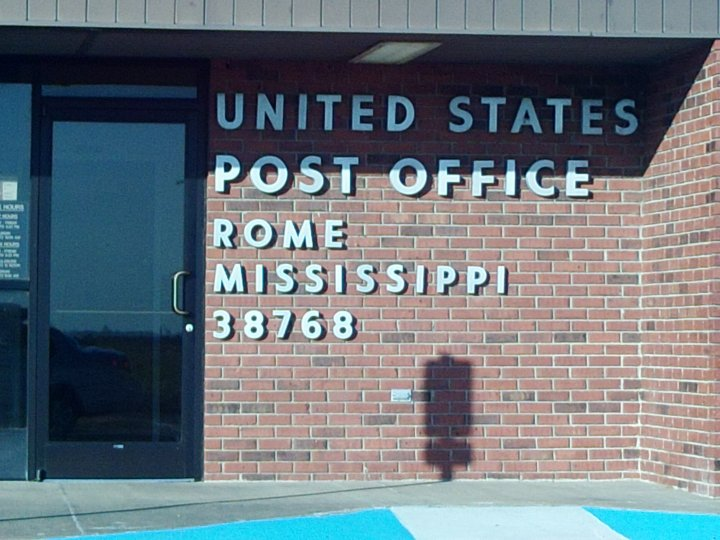
Rome Post Office located on Highway 49W
