= Constance Curry =

American civil rights activist (1933–2020)

- Born: July 19, 1933; Paterson, New Jersey
- Died: June 20, 2020 (aged 86); Atlanta, Georgia
- Education: Agnes Scott College
- Occupations: Community organizer, city government, author
- Known for: Education segregation in the Mississippi Delta
- Website: constancecurry.com

Constance Winifred Curry (July 19, 1933 – June 20, 2020) was an American civil rights activist, educator, and writer. A longtime opponent of racial discrimination, she was the first white woman to serve on the executive committee of the Student Nonviolent Coordinating Committee (SNCC).

== Early life ==
Born to Hazle and Ernest Curry in Paterson, New Jersey, she grew up in Greensboro, North Carolina and graduated from Greensboro High School, now known as Grimsley High School. She graduated Phi Beta Kappa from Agnes Scott College in 1955, and received a Fulbright scholarship to the University of Bordeaux. After studying political science at Columbia University, her first job was as a field secretary for the Collegiate Council for the United Nations (CCUN), a member organization of the United States Youth Council.

== Civil rights era ==
Her introduction to civil rights advocacy came when a student at Morehouse College invited her to a meeting. As the head of the National Student Association's Southern Student Human Relations Project, Curry quickly became involved with the Greensboro sit-ins that attempted to integrate whites-only lunch counters. Curry worked closely with fellow SNCC member Ella Baker after they were chosen as "adult advisors" at the SNCC's founding conference. She became an ally of Mae Bertha Carter and Mathew Carter during their successful 1965 fight to desegregate North Sunflower Academy in Mississippi. Curry's 1995 book Silver Rights chronicles the events surrounding the Carters, and won the 1996 Lillian Smith Book Award for nonfiction. She served as a field representative in the American Friends Service Committee from 1964 to 1975.

== Later life ==
In 1975 Curry became the City of Atlanta's Director of Human Services where she served under Maynard Jackson and then Andrew Young until 1990. After retiring she turned to telling the stories of those in the civil rights struggles, starting with the Carter family in Silver Rights, followed by Aaron Henry: The Fire Ever Burning, Mississippi Harmony: Memoirs of a Freedom Fighter, Deep in Our Hearts: Nine White Women in the Freedom Movement, and The Wrong Side of Murder Creek: A White Southerner in the Freedom Movement (winner of a second Lillian Smith Book Award for nonfiction in 2009). In 2003 she produced a film adaptation of Silver Rights, titled The Intolerable Burden. Her papers reside at Emory University in the Stuart A. Rose Manuscript, Archives, and Rare Book Library. She attended law school "just because I wanted to" and received her JD from the now-defunct Woodrow Wilson College of Law in 1984. She died of sepsis in Atlanta, Georgia, on 6 June 2020.

== Selected works ==
- Curry, Constance (10 January 1995). Silver Rights. Algonquin Books of Chapel Hill. ISBN 978-1-56512-095-2.
- Hudson, Winson; Curry, Constance (1 November 2002). Mississippi Harmony: memoirs of a freedom fighter. Palgrave Macmillan. ISBN 978-0312295530.
