= Luther Holbert =

African American man lynched in Mississippi

- Born: c. 1852; Mississippi, United States
- Died: February 7, 1904 (aged 51–52); Doddsville, Mississippi, US
- Cause of death: Burned alive
- Occupation: Farm hand

Luther Holbert (c. 1852 – February 7, 1904) was an African American man who was tortured and lynched by a mob in Doddsville, Mississippi on Sunday, February 7, 1904, after being accused of a double murder. An African American woman who was with Holbert was also tortured and killed. Other people were killed during the search for Holbert and the woman.

== Personal life ==
Holbert was born into slavery in about 1852 in Mississippi. He was freed after the American Civil War ended in 1865, and married Annie in 1884; they had four children. Holbert also had a child with a mistress.

== Background ==
On Wednesday February 3, 1904, the white landowner James Eastland went to find Holbert to order him off the plantation. Three men died in the encounter that followed. There was a scuffle and it was alleged that Holbert shot Eastland and an African American man named John Carr. Eastland returned fire and killed a black man named John Winters. Others stated that Eastland had attacked Holbert for encouraging other indebted Black workers to flee the slavery-like conditions of bonded labor.

News reached town and a posse was formed. Relatives of Eastland offered a $1,200 reward (about $37,000 in 2021). They came to the Eastland plantation and murdered an unknown black man. Holbert and a black woman had already fled. Several posses were formed with teams of bloodhounds. On February 4, 1904, one of the posses killed two other black men who were unlucky enough to be in their path.

On February 5, 1904, Holbert's sixteen-year-old son was taken into custody on suspicion of being involved. He was later released. On Sunday, February 7, 1904, a posse finally caught up with Holbert and the woman. They were found early in the morning sleeping in a wooded area near Shepardstown (near to Morgan City, Mississippi).

== Lynching ==
It was reported that about 1,000 people watched and cheered as Luther Holbert and an unidentified female were tortured and killed by a lynch mob. There was a party atmosphere with people eating deviled eggs, and drinking lemonade and whiskey. Some people went home with body parts of the victims. The lynching was planned for a Sunday afternoon so that they could have a large crowd. The lynching took place on the grounds of a black church in Doddsville.

Holbert and the woman were returned to Doddsville by the mob. They were tied to a tree while a fire was prepared. Members of the mob cut off the victims' fingers and ears and handed them out as souvenirs. Holbert was beaten so badly in his head that one of his eyes hung from its socket. Some in the mob then produced large corkscrews and jabbed them in and out of Holbert's legs and torso. According to the Vicksburg Evening Post they "bored them into the flesh ... and pulled out the spirals tearing out big pieces of raw quivering flesh every time".

Both victims were fully conscious when they were led to the fire. They burned the woman first in sight of Holbert, and then he was burned.

== Trial ==
C. C. Eastland was arrested for the murder of Holbert and the woman. When the case was before a judge, on September 22, 1904, Eastland's attorney made a motion to dismiss the charges. The judge dismissed all charges and Eastland was freed. It was reported that a large crowd applauded the decision. No-one was ever prosecuted for the lynching.

== Legacy ==
In November 1904, Woods Caperton Eastland, one of the brothers who led the posse, had a son; he was named James Eastland in honor of his uncle, and went on to become a U. S. Senator. He was a leader of Southern resistance to racial integration during the civil rights movement, often speaking of African Americans as "an inferior race."

In 1936, Holbert's lynching was memorialized in Bo Carter's blues hit "All Around Man", with its references to "the butcher-man", "screwin", "grindin", and "bore your hole till the auger-man comes".

In 2018, the torture and lynching of Luther Holbert was recognized at Alabama's National Memorial for Peace and Justice.

== See also ==
- List of lynching victims in the United States
