= African Americans in Mississippi =

Ethnic group in Mississippi

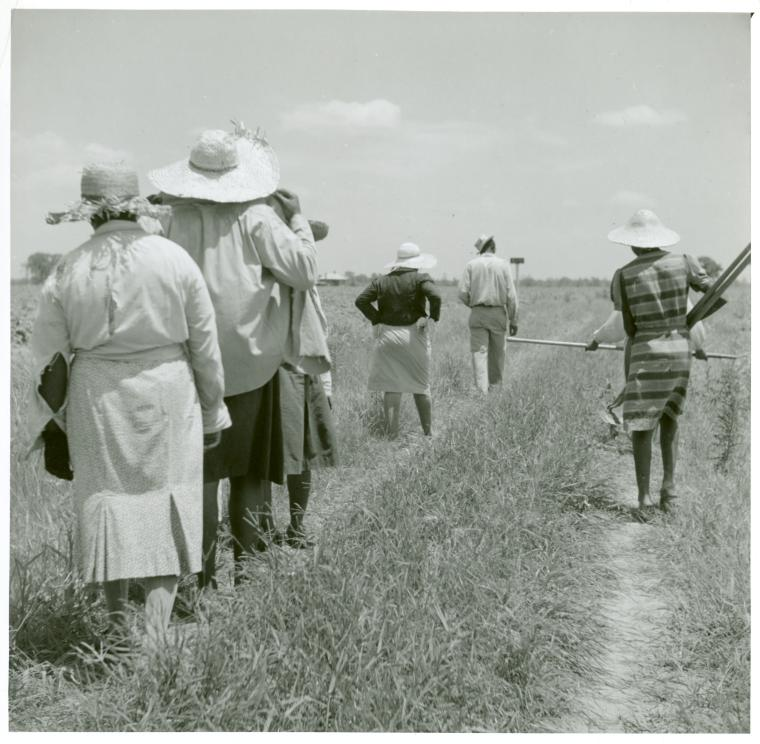
- African American cotton plantation workers in Mississippi

Total population
- 1,149,341 (2017)

Regions with significant populations
- Jackson metropolitan area, Mississippi Delta, rural majority Black counties throughout the state

Languages
- Southern American English, African-American Vernacular English, African American English

Religion
- Historically Black Protestant

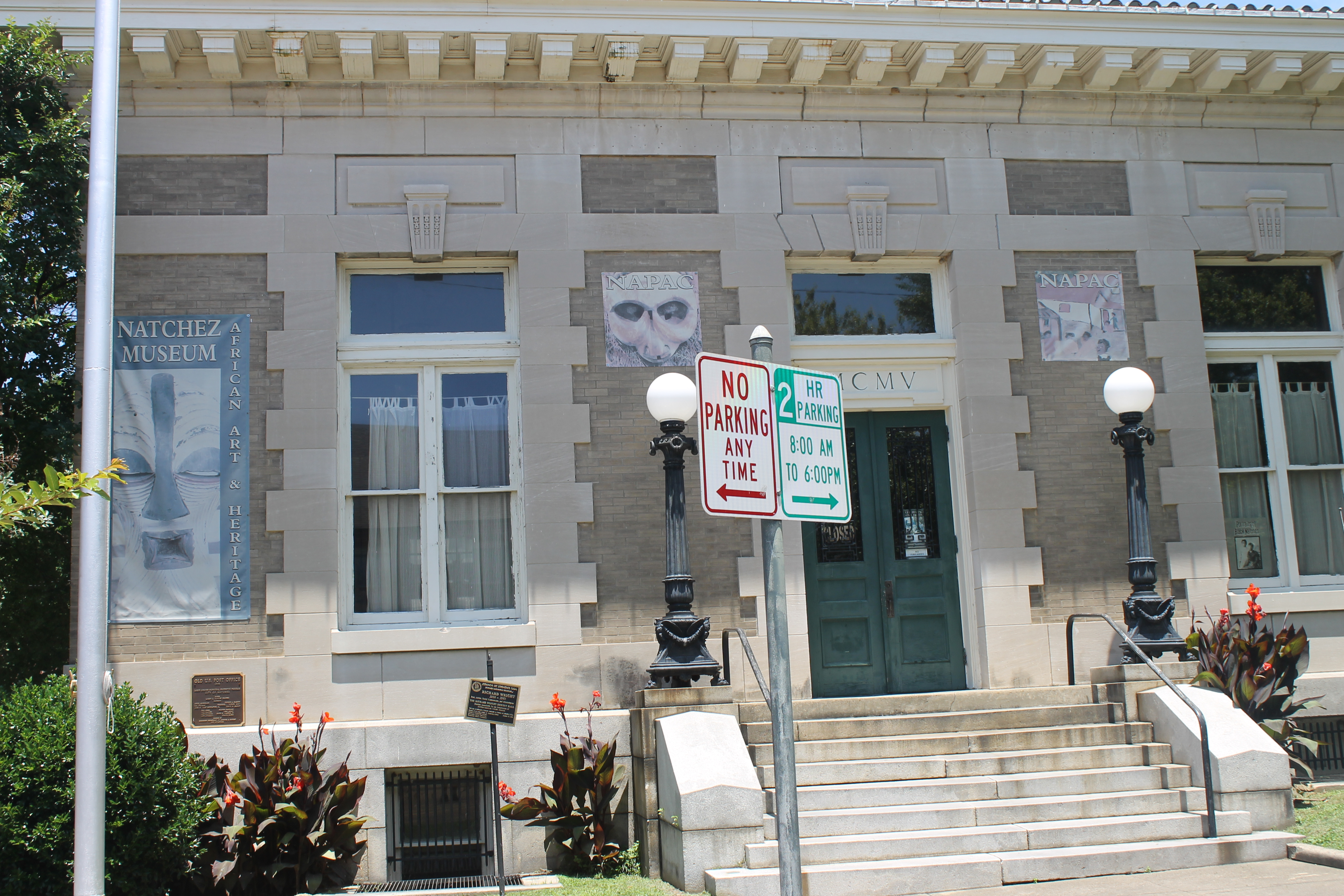
Natchez Museum of African American History and Culture in Natchez

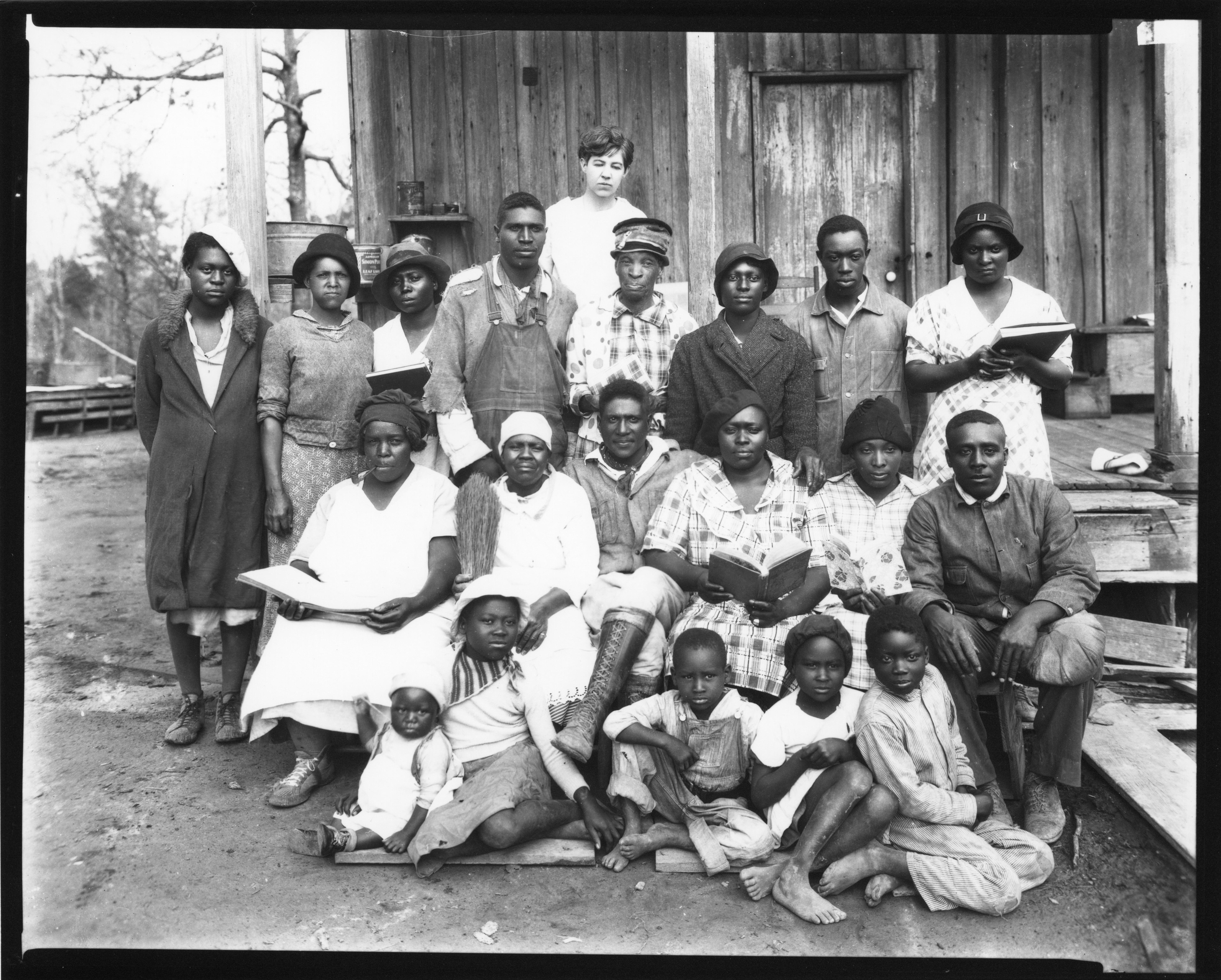
African Americans in Mississippi

African Americans in Mississippi or Black Mississippians are residents of the state of Mississippi who are of African American ancestry. As of the 2019 U.S. Census estimates, African Americans were 37.8% of the state's population, the highest proportion in the nation.

In the 2020 Census, 1,084,481 Mississippi residents were identified as African American (36.6% of the total 2,961,279). In 25 of the state's 82 counties, African Americans make up more than 50% of the population: Claiborne (87.5%), Jefferson (85.3%), Holmes (83.9%), Humphreys (78.5%), Tunica (77.3%), Coahoma (76.1%), Leflore (73.7%), Quitman (73.6%), Washington (71.3%), Sharkey (70.8%), and 15 other counties. African Americans in the 10 counties of Hinds (158,112), DeSoto (56,205), Harrison (51,706), Madison (38,647), Rankin (32,566), Lauderdale (32,133), Washington (32,042), Jackson (30,070), Forrest (28,330), Lowndes (25,997) make up more than 44% of all African Americans in the state.

African Americans were brought to Mississippi for cotton production during the slave trade.

== History ==
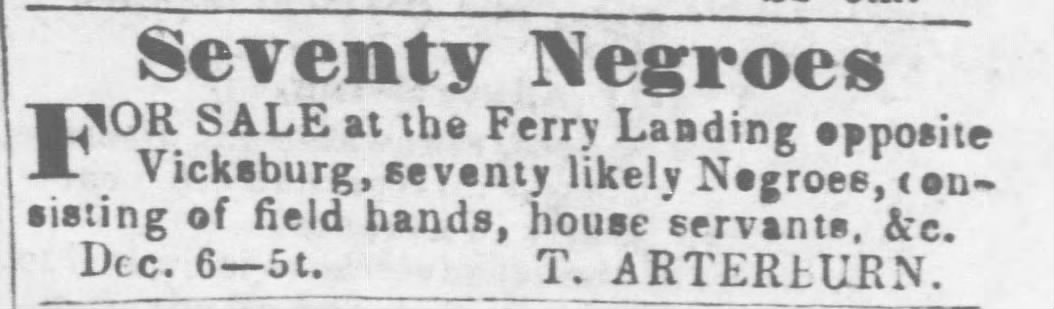
Slave ad in Yazoo City, Mississippi in 1844.

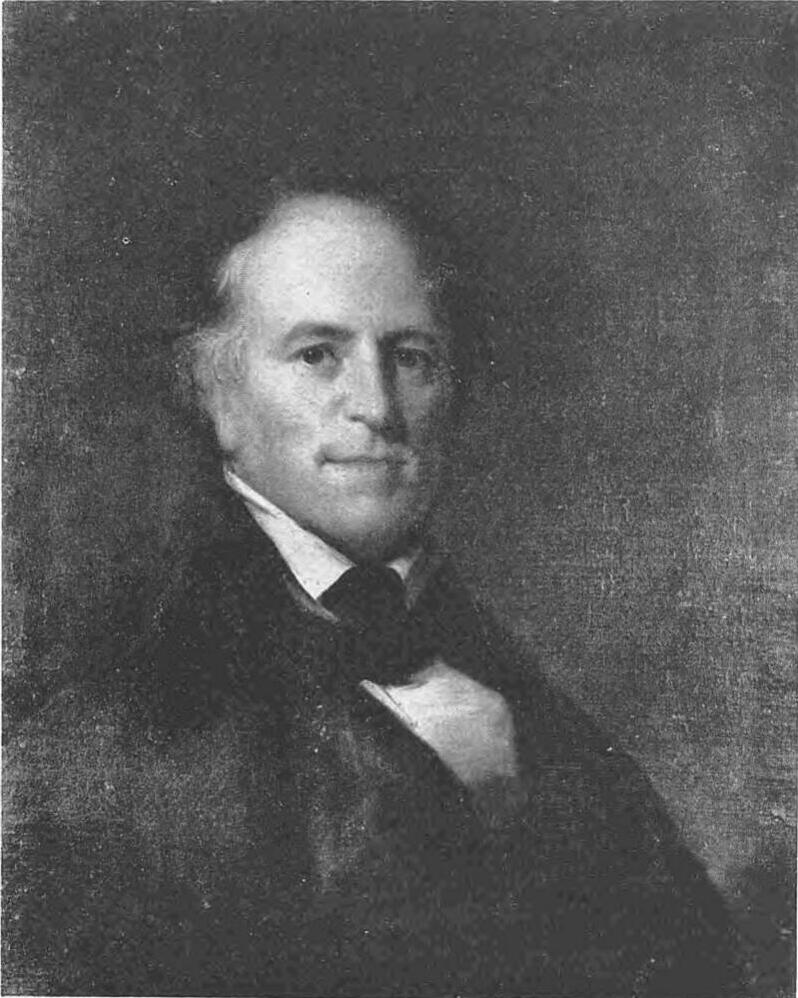
Stephen Duncan was the largest white slave owner in Mississippi.

Before the arrival of white people and African American slaves, Paleo-Indian groups in what is now the state Mississippi have existed for at least 12,000 years, dating back to the end of the Ice Age. Around 3,000 years ago, during the Mississippian Period, various Native American tribes known for building mounds lived along the Mississippi River. By the 1500s, when white European explorers arrived, the area was inhabited by several Amerindian tribes, including the Choctaw, Chickasaw, Natchez people, and Biloxi people. The region was first mapped in the year 1519 by Spanish explorer and cartographer Alonso Alvarez Pineda. In the year 1540, Spanish conquistador Hernando de Soto became the first European to explore the area, crossing the Mississippi River. Native Americans in the region largely remained undisturbed by Europeans until the year 1682, when French explorer René-Robert Cavelier, Sieur de La Salle had arrived, claimed the Mississippi River basin for France, and named it Louisiana in honor of King Louis XIV. Although La Salle's initial colonization attempt failed, the French recognized the value of the land at the river's mouth. In 1716, the French built Fort Rosalie at what is now Natchez. Tensions between white settlers and the Native Americans escalated, culminating in the Natchez revolt of 1729, which resulted in the deaths of 300 white Europeans. The French responded by devastating and attacking the Natchez tribe. Subsequently, French colonists then brought black slaves to the area, and by 1763, the enslaved black population had grown to about 6,000.

In 1718, French officials established rules to allow the importation of African slaves into the Biloxi area. By 1719, the first African slaves arrived. Most of those early enslaved people in Mississippi were Caribbean Creoles.

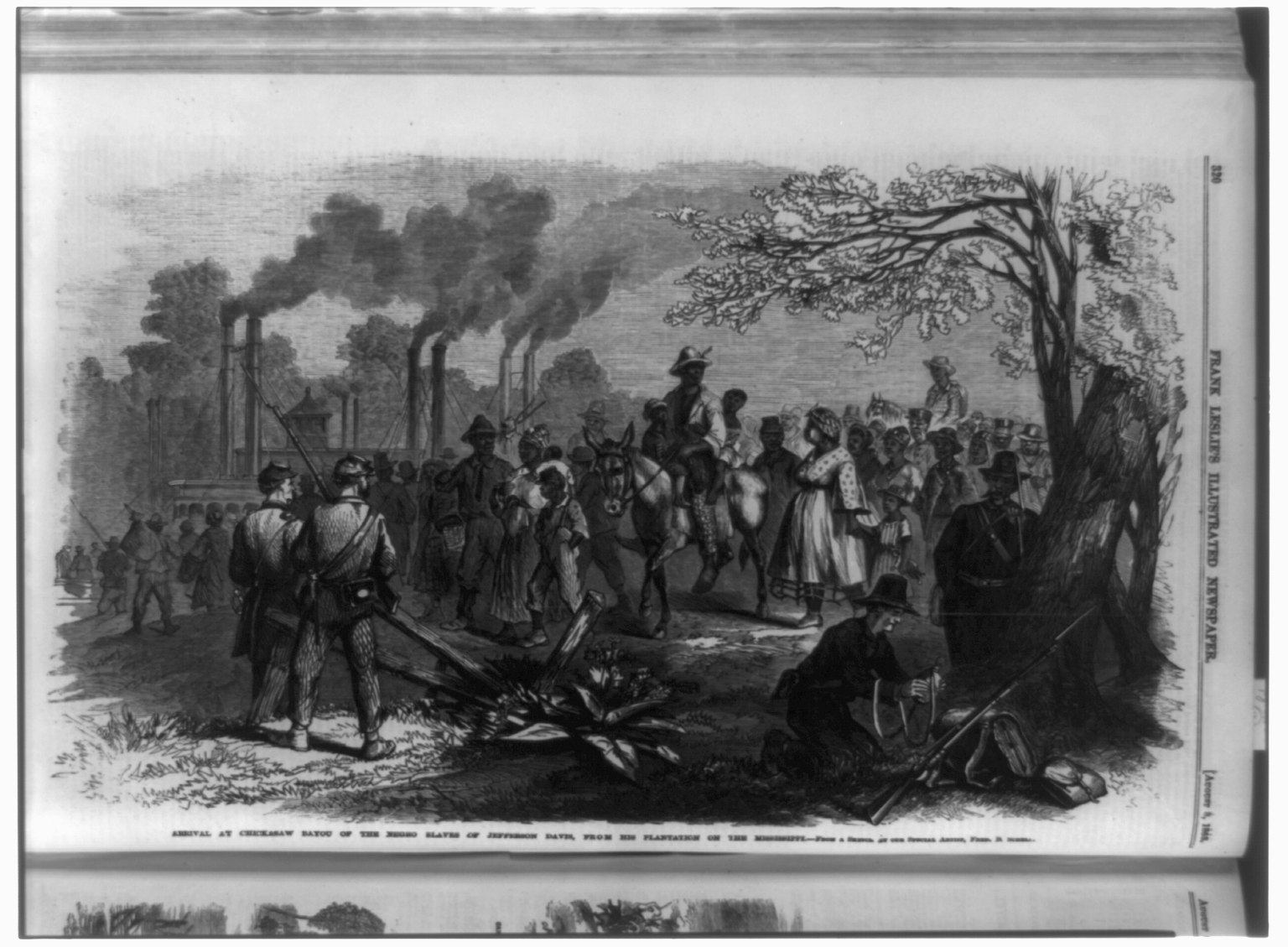
Arrival of slaves of Jefferson Davis at Chickasaw bayou.

The movement of importing black slaves to Mississippi peaked in the 1830s, when more than 100,000 black slaves may have entered Mississippi. The largest slave market was located at the Forks of the Road in Natchez.

As the demographer William H. Frey noted, "In Mississippi, I think it's [identifying as mixed race] changed from within." Historically in Mississippi, after Indian removal in the 1830s, the major groups were designated as black (African American), who were then mostly enslaved, and white (primarily European American). Matthew Snipp, also a demographer, commented on the increase in the 21st century in the number of people identifying as being of more than one race: "In a sense, they're rendering a more accurate portrait of their racial heritage that in the past would have been suppressed."

After having accounted for a majority of the state's population since well before the Civil War and through the 1930s, today African Americans constitute approximately 37 percent of the state's population. Some of these slaves were mixed race, with European ancestors, as there were many children born into slavery with white fathers. Some also have Native American ancestry. During the first half of the 20th century, a total of nearly 400,000 African Americans left the state during the Great Migration, for opportunities in the North, Midwest and West. They became a minority in the state for the first time since early in its development.

Around 16% of the African American voting age population is disenfranchised and represent half of the voting population disenfranchised in the state due to felony convictions.

== Lynching ==
The late 1800s and early 1900s in the Mississippi Delta showed both frontier influence and actions directed at repressing African Americans. After the Civil War, 90% of the Delta was still undeveloped. Both whites and African Americans migrated there for a chance to buy land in the backcountry. It was frontier wilderness, heavily forested and without roads for years. Before the start of the 20th century, lynchings often took the form of frontier justice directed at transient workers as well as residents.

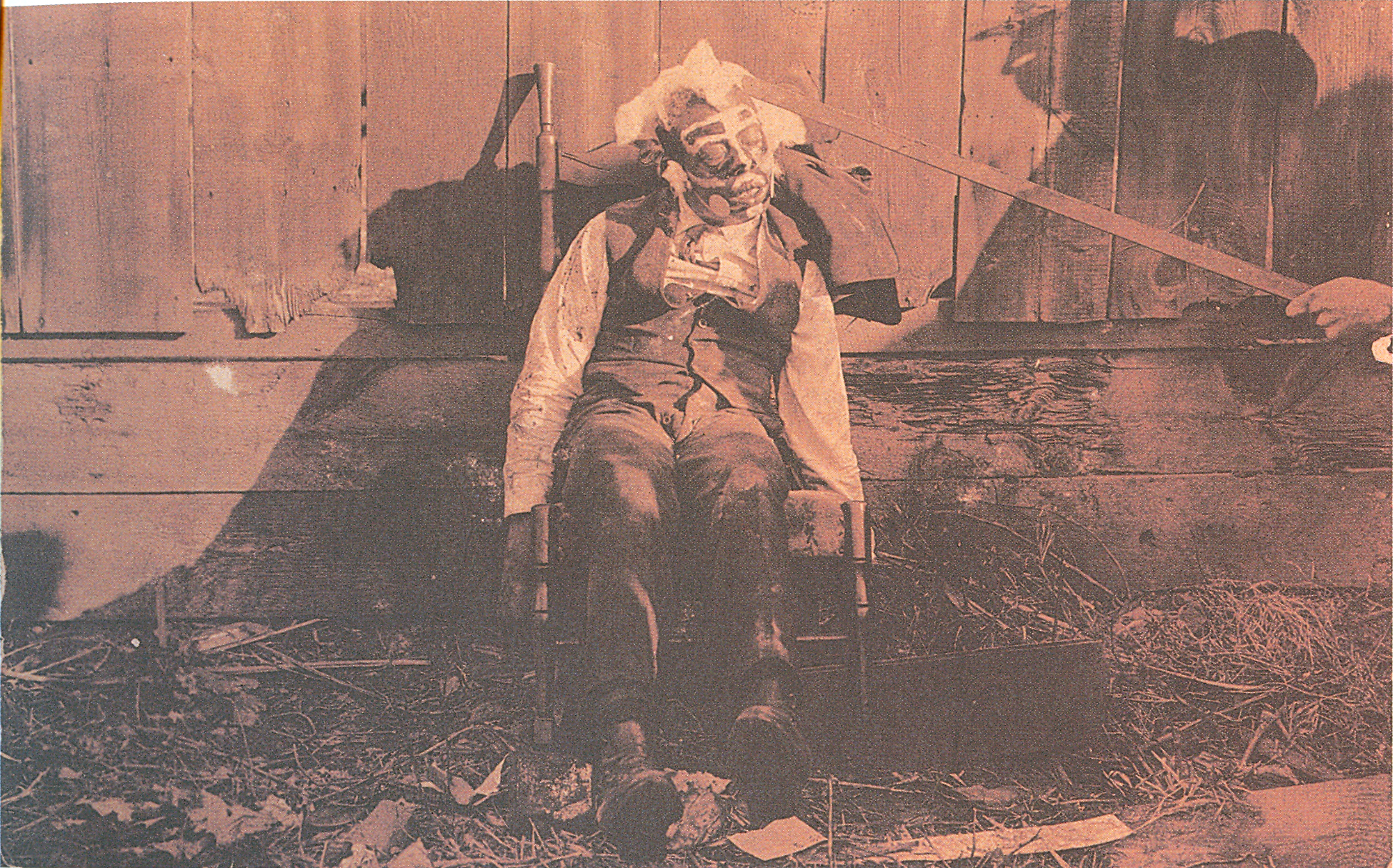
Body of a lynched black man, propped up in a rocking chair for a photograph, circa 1900. Paint has been applied to his face, circular disks glued to his cheeks, cotton glued to his face and head, while a rod props up the victim's head.

Whites accounted for just over 12 percent of the Delta region's population, but made up nearly 17 percent of lynching victims. So, in this region, they were lynched at a rate that was over 35 percent higher than their proportion in the population, primarily due to being accused of crimes against property (chiefly theft). Conversely, blacks were lynched at a rate, in the Delta, lesser than their proportion of the population. However, this was unlike the rest of the South, where blacks comprised the majority of lynching victims. In the Delta, they were most often accused of murder or attempted murder, in half the cases, and 15 percent of the time, they were accused of rape, meaning that another 15 percent of the time they were accused of a combination of rape and murder, or rape and attempted murder.

A clear seasonal pattern to lynchings existed with colder months being the deadliest. As noted, cotton prices fell during the 1880s and 1890s, increasing economic pressures. "From September through December, the cotton was picked, debts were revealed, and profits (or losses) realized... Whether concluding old contracts or discussing new arrangements, [landlords and tenants] frequently came into conflict in these months and sometimes fell to blows." During the winter, murder was most cited as a cause for lynching. After 1901, as economics shifted and more blacks became renters and sharecroppers in the Delta, with few exceptions, only African Americans were lynched. The frequency increased from 1901 to 1908 after African Americans were disfranchised. "In the twentieth century Delta vigilantism finally became predictably joined to white supremacy."

Conclusions of numerous studies since the mid-20th century have found the following variables affecting the rate of lynchings in the South: "lynchings were more numerous where the African American population was relatively large, the agricultural economy was based predominantly on cotton, the white population was economically stressed, the Democratic Party was stronger, and multiple religious organizations competed for congregants."

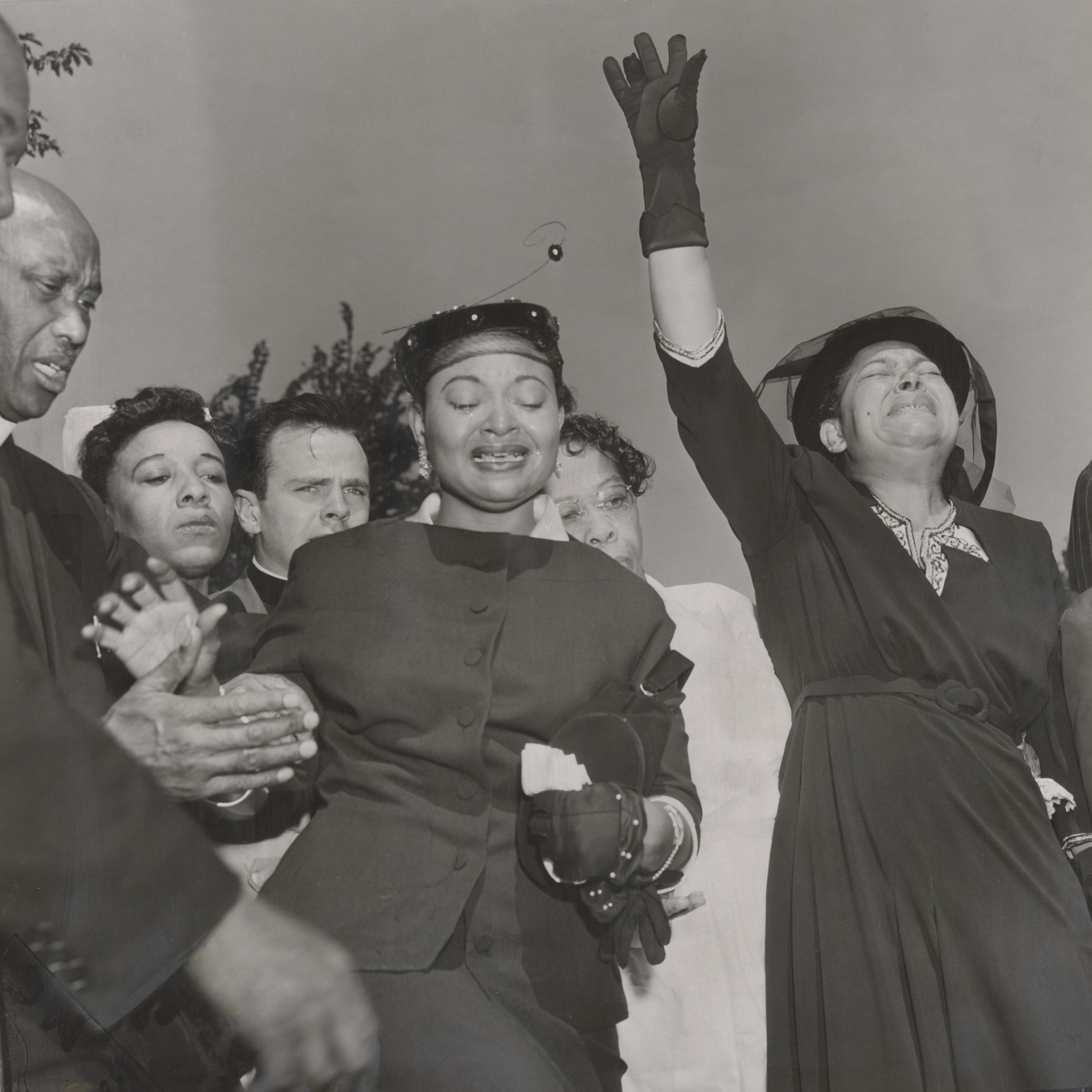
Emmett Till’s mother Mamie (middle) at her son’s funeral in 1955. He was killed by white men after a white woman accused him of offending her in her family's grocery store.

By the 1950s, the civil rights movement was gaining momentum. A 1955 lynching that sparked public outrage about injustice was that of Emmett Till, a 14-year-old boy from Chicago. Spending the summer with relatives in Money, Mississippi, Till was killed for allegedly having wolf-whistled at a white woman. Till had been badly beaten, one of his eyes was gouged out, and he was shot in the head. The visceral response to his mother's decision to have an open-casket funeral mobilized the black community throughout the U.S. Vann R. Newkirk wrote "the trial of his killers became a pageant illuminating the tyranny of white supremacy". The state of Mississippi tried two defendants, but they were speedily acquitted by an all-white jury.

== Notable people ==
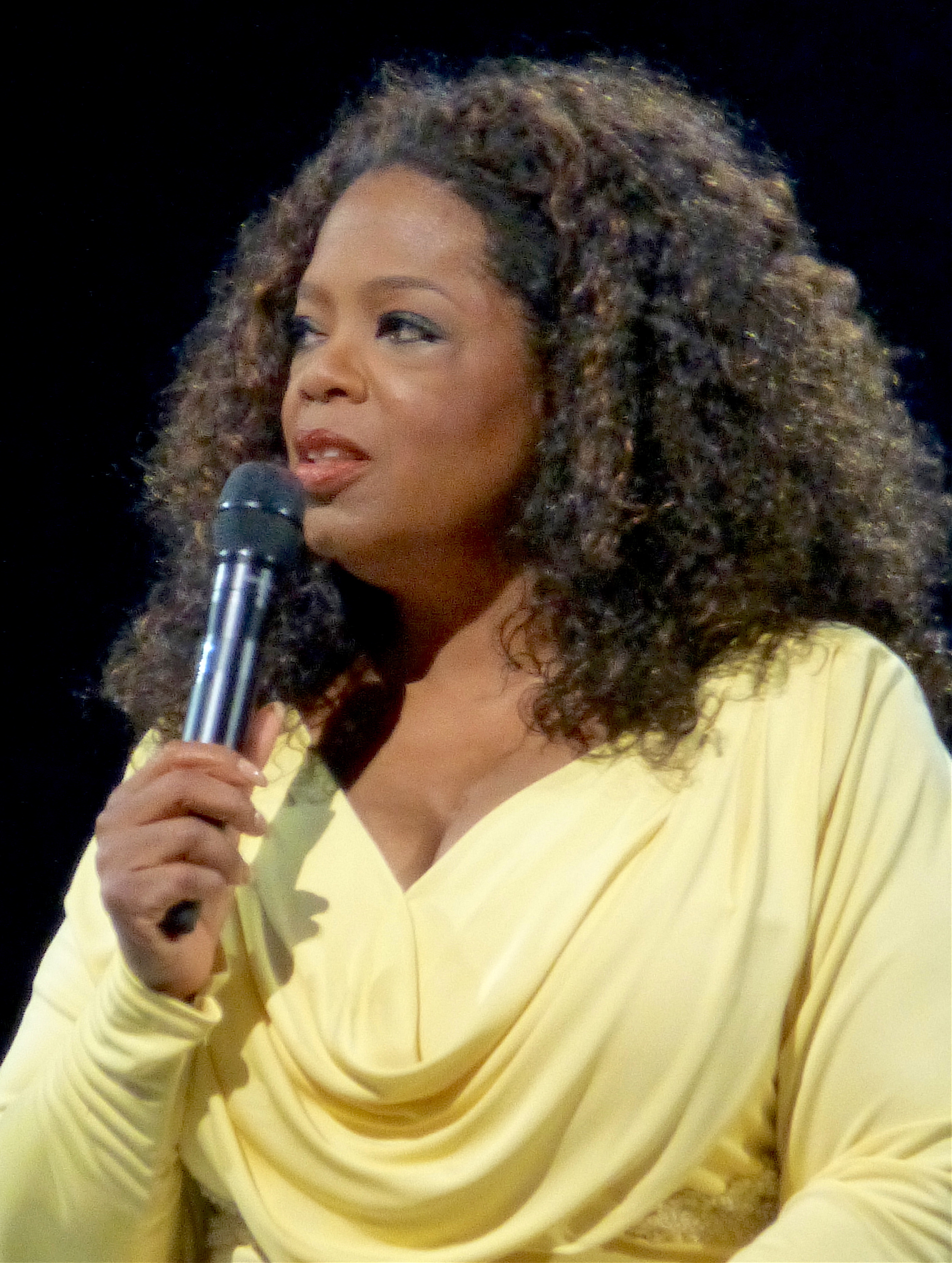
Oprah Winfrey

- Mae Bertha Carter - Figure of the Civil Rights Movement
- Aunjanue Ellis - Actress
- Fannie Lou Hamer - Figure of the Civil Rights Movement
- John M. Perkins - Figure of the Civil Rights Movement
- B.B. King - Musician
- Morgan Freeman - Actor
- Oprah Winfrey - Television personality, actress, producer
- Jerry Rice - NFL Football Player with the San Francisco 49ers
- Walter Payton NFL Football Player with the Chicago Bears
- Brandy Norwood Singer, actress
- Jerome Barkum - NFL Football Player with the New York Jets
- Lester Young - Musician, Tenor Saxophone
- Muddy Waters - Musician
- Howlin Wolf - Musician
- Elmore James - Musician
- Swae Lee - Musician
- Karlous Miller - Comedian
- James Earl Jones - Actor
- Ray J - Singer, TV Personality, singer
- Sam Cooke - Singer
- Robert L. Johnson BET founder
- Robert Johnson - Musician
- Ruby Bridges - Activist
- Medgar Evers - Activist
- Ida B. Wells - Activist
- Big K.R.I.T - Rapper
- Cassi Davis - Actress
- Shelby McEwen - Athlete
- Frederick O'Neal - Actor
- Beah Richards - Actress
- David Banner - Musician
- Rick Ross - Musician
- Soulja Boy - Musician
- Hiram R. Revels

== See also ==
- Black Southerners
- Demographics of Mississippi
- Education segregation in the Mississippi Delta
- History of slavery in Mississippi
- Killing of Joetha Collier
- List of African-American historic places in Mississippi
- List of African-American newspapers in Mississippi
- List of plantations in Mississippi
- Mississippi-in-Africa
- Mississippi Masala

== Sources ==
- Willis, John C. (2000). Forgotten Time: The Yazoo-Mississippi Delta After the Civil War. Charlottesville: University Press of Virginia. ISBN 0-8139-1971-1.
