= Sunflower, Mississippi =

- Town
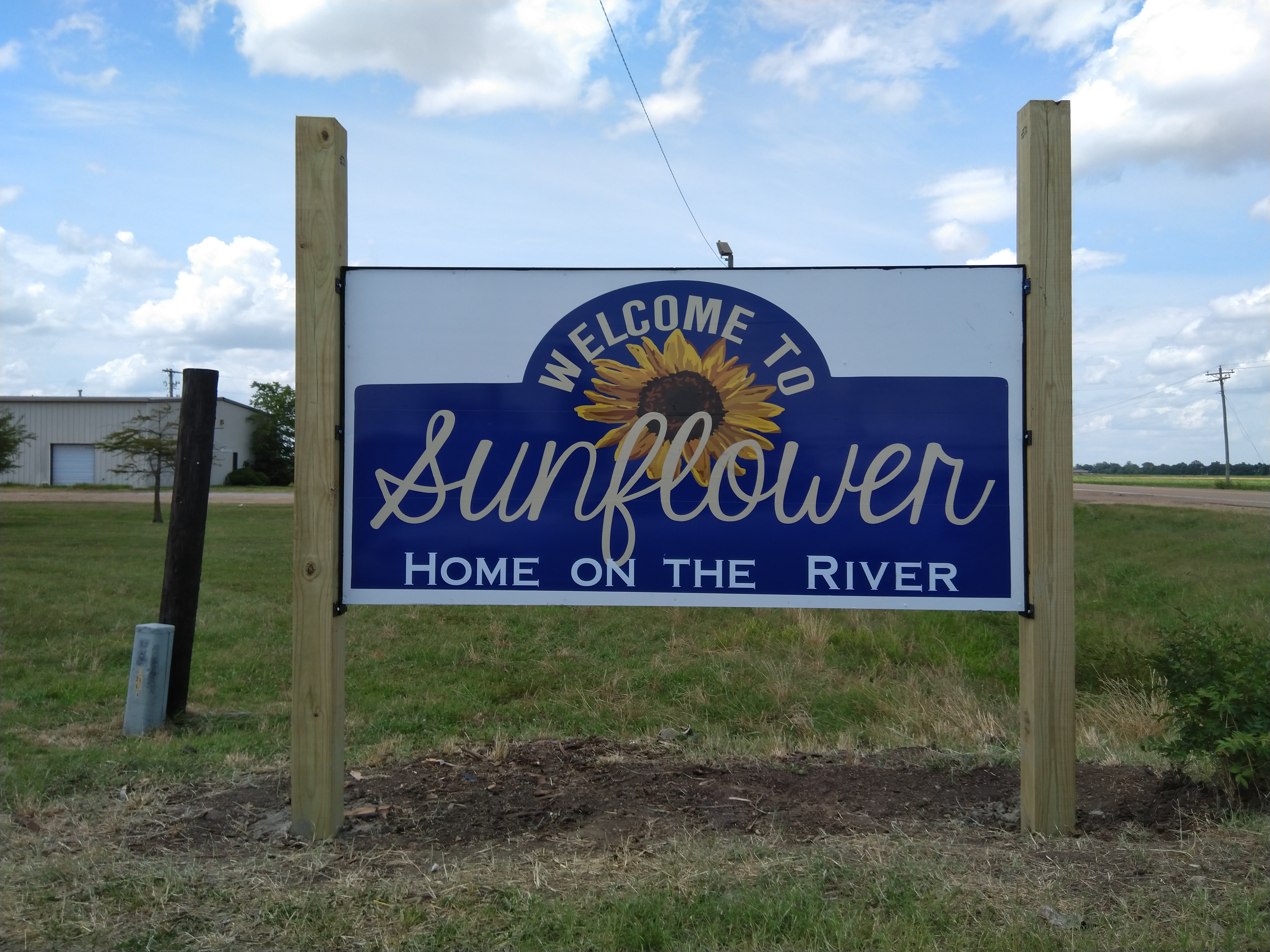
- Welcome sign in Sunflower
- Motto: Home On The River
- Location of Sunflower, Mississippi

- Location in the United States
- Coordinates: 33°32′39″N 90°32′14″W
- Country: United States
- State: Mississippi
- County: Sunflower

Area
  - Total: 0.61 sq mi (1.57 km^{2})
  - Land: 0.61 sq mi (1.57 km^{2})
  - Water: 0 sq mi (0.00 km^{2})
- Elevation: 121 ft (37 m)

Population (2020)
  - Total: 964
  - Density: 1,590.3/sq mi (614.01/km^{2})
- Time zone: UTC-6 (Central (CST))
  - Summer (DST): UTC-5 (CDT)
- ZIP code: 38778
- Area code: 662
- FIPS code: 28-71600
- GNIS feature ID: 2406690

Sunflower is a town in Sunflower County, Mississippi, United States. As of the 2020 census, Sunflower had a population of 964.

== Demographics ==
Historical population
Census	Pop.	Note	%±
1920	517		—
1930	530		2.5%
1940	630		18.9%
1950	639		1.4%
1960	662		3.6%
1970	983		48.5%
1980	1,027		4.5%
1990	729		−29.0%
2000	696		−4.5%
2010	1,159		66.5%
2020	964		−16.8%
U.S. Decennial Census

=== Racial and ethnic composition ===
Sunflower town, Mississippi – Racial and ethnic composition Note: the US Census treats Hispanic/Latino as an ethnic category. This table excludes Latinos from the racial categories and assigns them to a separate category. Hispanics/Latinos may be of any race.
Race / Ethnicity (NH = Non-Hispanic)	Pop 2000	Pop 2010	Pop 2020	% 2000	% 2010	% 2020
White alone (NH)	193	139	103	27.73%	11.99%	10.68%
Black or African American alone (NH)	496	1,000	846	71.26%	86.28%	87.76%
Native American or Alaska Native alone (NH)	0	0	2	0.00%	0.00%	0.21%
Asian alone (NH)	3	0	0	0.43%	0.00%	0.00%
Native Hawaiian or Pacific Islander alone (NH)	0	0	0	0.00%	0.00%	0.00%
Other race alone (NH)	0	0	0	0.00%	0.00%	0.00%
Mixed race or Multiracial (NH)	3	2	8	0.43%	0.17%	0.83%
Hispanic or Latino (any race)	1	18	5	0.14%	1.55%	0.52%
Total	696	1,159	964	100.00%	100.00%	100.00%

=== 2020 census ===
As of the 2020 United States census, there were 964 people, 424 households, and 278 families residing in the town.

=== 2000 census ===
As of the census of 2000, there were 696 people, 229 households, and 166 families residing in the town. The population density was 1,719.3 inhabitants per square mile (663.8/km^{2}). There were 242 housing units at an average density of 597.8 per square mile (230.8/km^{2}). The racial makeup of the town was 27.87% White, 71.26% African American, 0.43% Asian, and 0.43% from two or more races. Hispanic or Latino of any race were 0.14% of the population.

There were 229 households, out of which 36.2% had children under the age of 18 living with them, 41.9% were married couples living together, 25.8% had a female householder with no husband present, and 27.5% were non-families. 24.9% of all households were made up of individuals, and 12.7% had someone living alone who was 65 years of age or older. The average household size was 3.04 and the average family size was 3.69.

In the town, the population was spread out, with 30.7% under the age of 18, 14.5% from 18 to 24, 25.6% from 25 to 44, 15.8% from 45 to 64, and 13.4% who were 65 years of age or older. The median age was 29 years. For every 100 females, there were 92.3 males. For every 100 females age 18 and over, there were 79.9 males.

The median income for a household in the town was $21,842, and the median income for a family was $23,750. Males had a median income of $22,143 versus $21,458 for females. The per capita income for the town was $12,176. About 30.7% of families and 39.5% of the population were below the poverty line, including 52.6% of those under age 18 and 35.1% of those age 65 or over.

== Education ==
The Town of Sunflower is served by the Sunflower County Consolidated School District (formerly Sunflower County School District).

- Elementary students are zoned to Ruleville Central Elementary School
- As of 2012 it was zoned to Ruleville Central High School (now Thomas E. Edwards, Sr. High School), at the time the sole school of the district.

Students were formerly zoned to East Sunflower Elementary School, until it closed in 2022. Students were reassigned to Ruleville Central Elementary.

Sunflower is also home to the Sunflower County Freedom Project, an independent, non-profit after-school program for middle- and high-school students, based on the Freedom Schools of the 1960s.

== Notable people ==
- Willie Best, African-American actor from the 1930s and 1940s
- Jerry Butler, soul singer, inductee in Rock and Roll Hall of Fame
- Craig Claiborne, longtime food critic for The New York Times
- C.L. Franklin, former pastor of New Bethel Baptist Church (1946–1979) and father of American singer and songwriter Aretha Franklin
- Larry Herndon, Major League Baseball player for the Detroit Tigers
- Little Milton, blues singer and guitarist, inductee in Blues Hall of Fame
- Matt "Guitar" Murphy, blues guitarist
- Doc Terry, electric blues harmonica player
- Big John Wrencher, blues harmonica player and singer
