= Killing of Joetha Collier =

1971 homicide in the United States

- Part of the post–civil rights era in African-American history
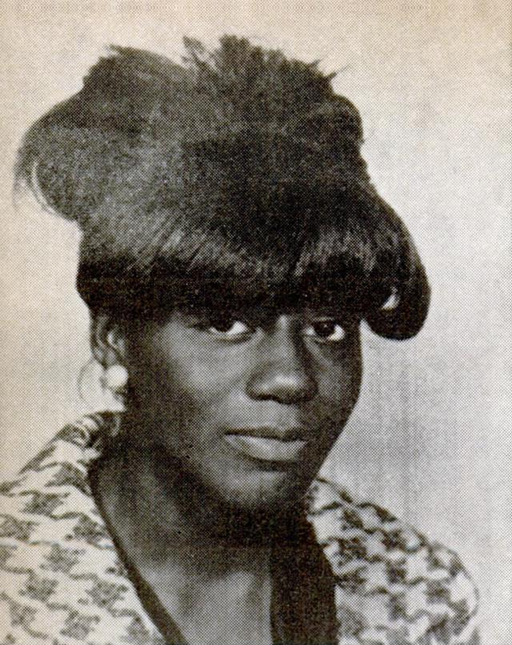
- Collier in an undated photograph
- Location: Drew, Mississippi, United States
- Date: May 25, 1971; 9:45 p.m. CDT
- Target: Joetha Collier
- Attack type: Shooting
- Weapon: .22 caliber gun
- Deaths: 1
- Accused: Wayne Parks; Wesley Parks; Allan Wilkenson
- Charges: Murder
- Verdict: Wesley Parks found guilty of manslaughter; Charges dismissed against Wayne Parks and Allan Wilkenson
- Convictions: Manslaughter
- Convicted: 1 (Wesley Parks)
- Judge: B. B. Wilkes

Joetha Collier (September 20, 1952 – May 25, 1971) was an American high school student who was shot and killed on the night of her graduation in Drew, Mississippi, United States. The killing, which was committed by a White American against an African American, drew widespread media attention and the attention of several civil rights activists.

Collier was a black woman who was 18 years old at the time of her death. Earlier in the day, she had graduated from Drew High School, a recently integrated institution, and planned to attend Mississippi Valley State College. That evening, she was celebrating with several friends in Drew when someone in a passing vehicle shot her in the neck with a .22 caliber gun. She died before reaching the hospital. The individuals in the car—Wayne Parks, Wesley Parks, and Allan Wilkenson—were arrested early the next morning and charged with murder. In a trial later that year against Wesley (the individual who had fired the shot that killed Collier), he said that he had been drunk at the time of the shooting and had been unaware that anyone had been shot. He was ultimately found guilty of manslaughter and sentenced to 20 years of imprisonment, though he was released early. Charges against the other two were dropped.

In 2022, historian Keisha N. Blain said of the event, "Her killing, and the subsequent court proceedings, did briefly galvanize civil-rights activists during the 1970s, but her story has since faded from the public imagination." Her funeral was attended by several civil rights activists, including Ralph Abernathy, Fannie Lou Hamer, and Aaron Henry, with the latter directly appealing to President Richard Nixon for federal intervention in the case. However, the Federal Bureau of Investigation did not file any federal charges. Additionally, a subsequent reopening of the file by the United States Department of Justice was closed in January 2020 by the department's Civil Rights Division without referral or prosecution.

== Life and background ==
Joetha Collier (Note: Sources vary on the spelling of Collier's first name. In a contemporary article in Time, it is spelled "Jo-Etha", though most sources give it as either "Joetha" or "Jo Etha", with the latter being used by the United States Department of Justice. However, in a 2022 article in The Atlantic, historian Keisha N. Blain gave the spelling as "Joetha" and wrote, "at the time, the media often got her name wrong, misspelling it as 'Jo Etha'.") was a black woman who was born on September 20, 1952, to Gussie Mae and Jimmie Lee Collier in Starkville, Mississippi. In the early 1960s, following her father's death, she relocated with her mother and several siblings to live with her stepfather in the Mississippi Delta. By early 1971, she had seven siblings, all brothers, and lived with her family near the city limits of Ruleville, Mississippi. By that time, she was a student at Drew High School in Drew, Mississippi, a municipality of about 3,000 people in the Delta. The school had recently undergone racial desegregation, with a student body consisting of about 150 African Americans and 50 White Americans. Collier was in her final semester, where she was one of 28 African Americans in a senior class of 43 students. In high school, Collier was a multi-sport athlete, being a member of both the women's basketball team and the track team, winning an award in the latter for being the most valuable member. She intended to study physical education at Mississippi Valley State College, having received a scholarship to attend, with plans of becoming a teacher.

== Killing ==
On May 25, 1971, Drew High School held its graduation ceremony, with Collier being recognized as an honors student. Following the event, Collier went with several friends to a nearby cafe to celebrate. At about 9:45 p.m. CDT, Collier and three friends left the cafe and walked up Union Street, which was crowded with individuals who were celebrating the end of the academic year. She was walking home. While on Union Street near the cafe, a vehicle passed by her that had three white men in it. She was shot by someone in that vehicle, with the bullet, a .22 caliber, striking her beneath her ear, in the back of her neck. She died on the sidewalk. Her killing occurred less than an hour after the conclusion of the graduation, with Collier still wearing her academic dress and carrying her high school diploma and a photograph of her graduating class. She was 18 years old.

== Aftermath ==
=== Response ===
Per The New York Times, J. D. Fleming, Drew's police chief, reported "a minor rock‐throwing incident" immediately following the shooting. The following day, protest marches were conducted by African Americans in both Drew and Ruleville, with Mayor W. O. Williford of Drew saying that there were reports of people throwing rocks at cars during the events. That day, the mayor enacted a curfew of 8 p.m., requesting assistance from the Mississippi Highway Patrol for enforcement. Speaking of the event, Williford called it "a senseless act of violence" that was "just unexplainable". Hodding Carter III, the editor of the Delta Democrat Times newspaper, said concerning the killing, "It's a moral outrage, but also a chance to prove it is an aberration and not part of an unending string of events."

According to reporting in Time, many African Americans in the state believed that Collier's killing had been racially motivated. Civil rights activist Fannie Lou Hamer said concerning the killing, "She was black, that was the reason she was shot down", further saying, "I believe they had watched this girl, because she was black and smart". On May 30, Edmund Muskie of the United States Senate discussed the killing during a commencement speech at Rivier College, saying,

No one knows why Miss Collier was singled out to die. There were only two things about her that most people noticed after she was murdered on Tuesday night. She was clutching her diploma in her left hand—and she was black.

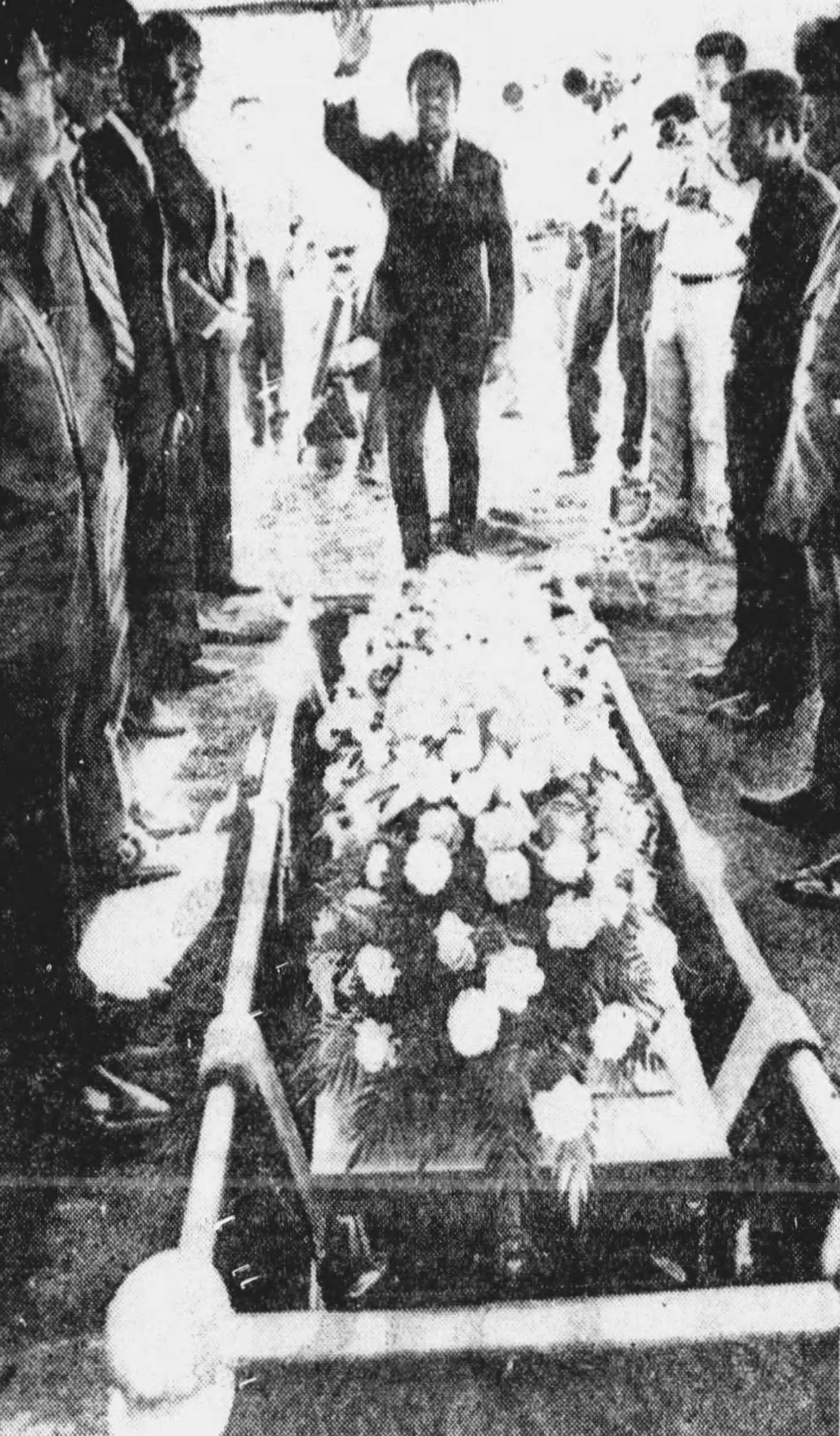
Civil rights activist Ralph Abernathy performed a graveside service at Collier's funeral.

On the morning of May 27, 31 protestors were arrested for marching in Ruleville's central business district. That same day, about 200 African American protestors conducted a similar march in Drew. On May 29, activist Cleve McDowell organized a meeting at a local Methodist church for African Americans in the area to voice their grievances. On May 30, Collier's funeral was held in the same auditorium that had hosted the high school's graduation ceremony. About 700 people were present in the auditorium, including white city officials, with about 1,300 people participating in the funeral ceremony. After the funeral, about 100 people traveled with the body to a local cemetery. Activist Ralph Abernathy participated in the ceremony, delivering a eulogy and, at the cemetery, he performed last rites. Other activists, including Hamer and Aaron Henry (the president of the Mississippi branch of the NAACP) also attended the services.

==== Federal government involvement ====
In a telegram sent by Henry to United States President Richard Nixon a day after the killing, he said, "There was no provocation and no words were passed. It is doubtful they knew Miss Collier. They were apparently out to kill a black, any black." Henry also noted that the killing occurred around the same time that several activists who had been working on a voter registration campaign for African Americans had been targeted with threats of violence, including bomb threats and having the tires of their vehicles slashed. Copies of the telegram were also sent to members of the United States Congress and officials in the United States Department of Justice, with Henry urging federal intervention in the state.

In response, Ron Ziegler, the White House Press Secretary, said that Nixon considered the killing a "deplorable and appalling act". Subsequently, Nixon ordered the Federal Bureau of Investigation to determine whether a federal crime had been committed, with federal agents making inquiries by May 27. Specifically, the bureau was attempting to determine whether there had been a civil rights violation that would result in the case falling under the jurisdiction of the federal government. However, on May 28, the bureau announced that they would not be filing federal charges in relation to the killing.

=== Arrests and trials ===
Several witnesses to the killing were able to identify the vehicle, and at about 2 a.m. the following day, police arrested three white men—Wayne Parks (age 25), Wesley Parks (26), and Allan Wilkenson (Note: Also given as "Wilkerson".) (19)—in Cleveland, Mississippi, about 18 miles (29 kilometers) from Drew. Wayne lived in Drew, while Wesley (Wayne's brother) and Allan (Wayne's and Wesley's nephew) were from Memphis, Tennessee. The individuals had several loaded weapons with them, including a .22 caliber gun that had one expended round. According to police, two of the individuals were drunk at the time of their arrest. On the same day that they were arrested, they were charged with murder. They were initially held in Cleveland's jail, but the following day they were transferred to the Mississippi State Penitentiary. They were scheduled to make their first court appearances on June 7. The three men were indicted by a grand jury and on July 14, during their arraignment, they all pleaded not guilty. Wesley was accused of being the individual who fired the shot that killed Collier. His trial was held in October, with Judge B. B. Wilkes of the Mississippi Circuit Courts presiding.

==== Timeline of events ====
During Wesley's trial, a rough timeline was created concerning the killing. At 4 p.m. on May 25, Wesley, Wilkenson, and his family drove from Memphis to Drew to visit Wayne. Before leaving, Wilkenson and Wesley had consumed 1 U.S. gallon (3.8 liters) of beer, with Wesley drinking an additional can of beer during the drive. They arrived at Wayne's house at about 7 p.m. Wayne, Wesley, and Wilkenson then traveled into Drew to drink more beer before returning to Wayne's house for supper. They then drove back into Drew to get more beer, during which time they stopped at a gas station. According to a summary of the case compiled during an appeal to the Supreme Court of Mississippi, "conflicting testimony" concerns Wesley's actions while at the gas station, with some testimony indicating that he had brandished a gun and directed "unfriendly remarks" towards a group of African American youth. After stopping at a grocery store, the three then drove down Union Street when Wesley pointed his gun out of the car and fired a single shot, killing Collier. Wayne told Wesley to put his gun away, afraid that they would be arrested for disturbing the peace. According to Wesley, he had been drunk at the time and did not remember shooting Collier. The three then went to a friend's house and, later, a bar in Cleveland, where they stayed from approximately 11 p.m. until 1:30 a.m. the next morning. They were arrested by officers of the Cleveland Police Department after leaving the bar, having stopped at a pay phone to call Wayne's home.

==== Convictions and sentencing ====
On October 29, a jury consisting of eight African Americans and four White Americans found Wesley guilty of manslaughter. Following the conviction, Judge Wilkes sentenced him to 20 years of imprisonment, which was the maximum sentence allowed. In a later trial concerning the other two charged individuals, they said that they had been unaware that there had been a gun in the vehicle and were unaware that anyone had been shot. On March 5, District Attorney George Everett of Greenwood, Mississippi, announced that the murder charges against Wayne and Wilkenson would be dismissed, saying, "We had no charge we could try them on after the previous trial."

As of March 1972, Wesley was out of prison on an appeal bond. In October of that year, the Supreme Court of Mississippi heard his appeal, where Wesley argued that there had been two errors in his trial. Firstly, the court's decision to reject his motion for a change of venue hindered his ability to receive a fair trial. Secondly, the court failed to adequately define manslaughter in its jury instructions. On October 23, the Supreme Court ruled against Wesley on both counts and upheld the decision from the lower court. In May 1973, he began to serve his sentence at the Mississippi State Penitentiary. Later that month, in an interview with the Delta Democrat Times, Emmett C. Burns Jr.—a field director for the Mississippi branch of the NAACP—stated that within a week of his incarceration, he was receiving special treatment within the prison and was "living in the front camp reserved only for professionals who happen to be prisoners". Ultimately, he was released early. In 2021, The Enterprise-Tocsin reported that it was unclear how much of his sentence was served.

=== Later events and legacy ===
In 2019, Collier's name appeared on a list of cases compiled by the Department of Justice that would undergo reexamination. This was based on a referral as part of a series of reviews under the terms of the Emmett Till Unsolved Civil Rights Crime Act. However, on January 13, 2020, the department's Civil Rights Division issued a notice to close the file without referral or prosecution. Per the division, the statute of limitations for any relevant civil rights crimes had expired by that time and no additional federal crimes were implicated by Collier's death. Additionally, further prosecution of Wesley by the state would violate the Double Jeopardy Clause of the Constitution of the United States.

In 2021, on the fiftieth anniversary of the shooting, friends and family members of Collier gathered in Drew to commemorate the event and discuss her legacy and memory. The following year, the killing was the subject of an article written by historian Keisha N. Blain in The Atlantic. In the article, she compared the killing to other acts of violence that had been committed against African Americans in the Delta, including the lynching of Emmett Till, and said, "Her killing, and the subsequent court proceedings, did briefly galvanize civil-rights activists during the 1970s, but her story has since faded from the public imagination."

== See also ==
- African Americans in Mississippi
- Crime in Mississippi
