= Aubrey Rozzell =

American football player (1932–2015)

No. 66
- Position: Linebacker

Personal information
- Born: November 2, 1932; Rome, Mississippi
- Died: October 14, 2015 (aged 82); Quitman, Mississippi
- Listed height: 6 ft 2 in (1.88 m)
- Listed weight: 215 lb (98 kg)

Career information
- High school: Clarksdale (MS)
- College: Delta State

Career history
- Pittsburgh Steelers (1957); Montreal Alouettes (1958)
- Stats at Pro Football Reference

Aubrey Rozzell (November 2, 1932 – October 14, 2015) was an American football linebacker. He played for the Pittsburgh Steelers in 1957 and for the Montreal Alouettes in 1958.

He died on October 14, 2015, in Quitman, Mississippi at age 82.
