= North Sunflower Academy =

Segregation academy in Mississippi

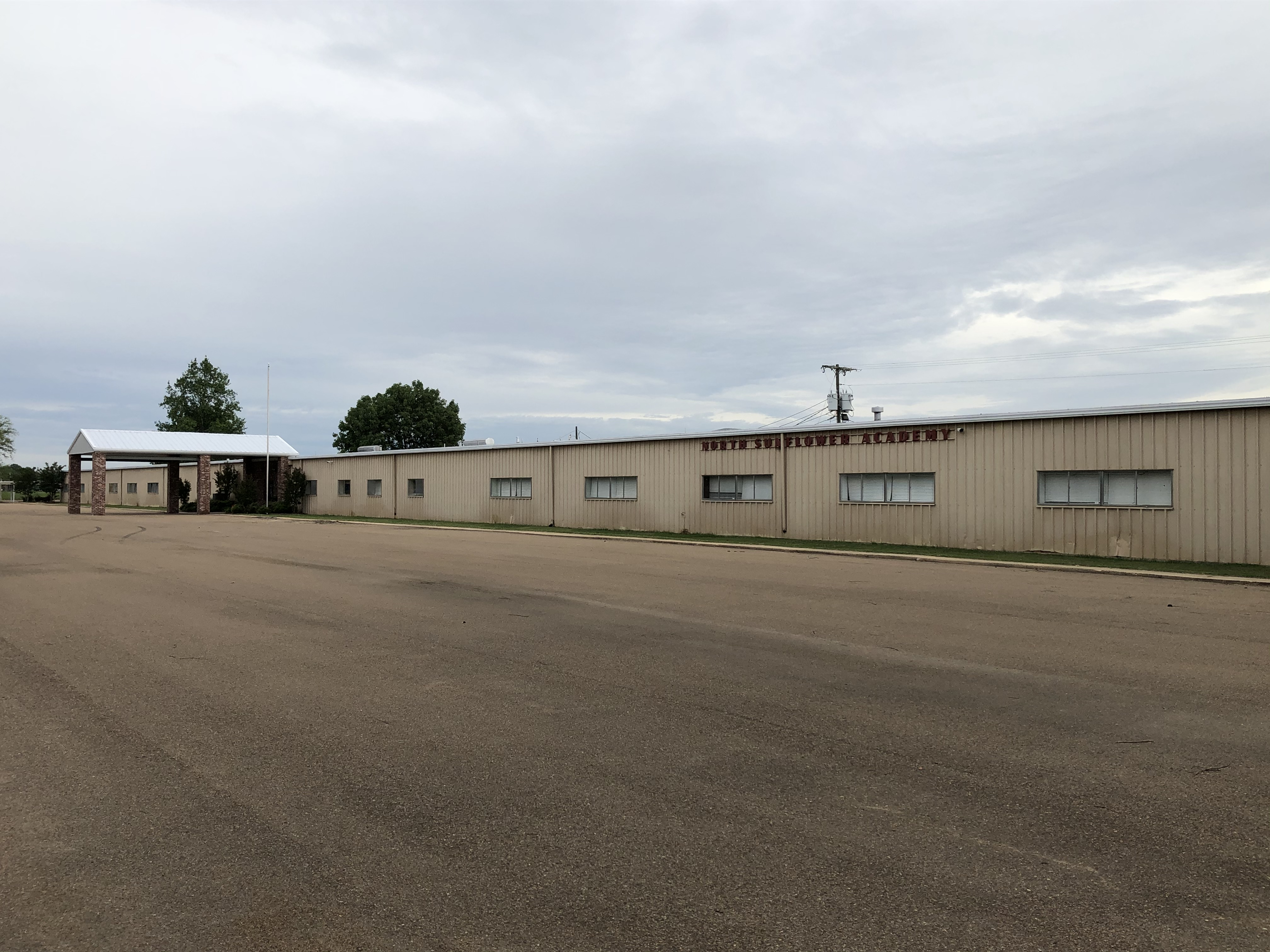
- Main school building with main (East) entrance

Location
- 33.768252°N 90.539809°W

Information
- Established: 1966
- Faculty: 16.6
- Grades: K-12
- Enrollment: 126 (2018)
- Colors: red and blue
- Website: nsarebels.com

North Sunflower Academy is a private school, founded to provide a segregated education for white students in unincorporated Sunflower County, Mississippi, in the Mississippi Delta area, between Ruleville and Drew. The school has grades Kindergarten through 12. As of 2002, the school draws students from Doddsville, Drew, Merigold, Ruleville, Schlater, Tutwiler, and Webb.

== History ==
The school originated as a segregation academy. After the Drew School District was desegregated, white residents of Drew enrolled their children in North Sunflower Academy. When the school was founded, there were only eight students per grade.

In 1969 the State of Mississippi passed a law written by Ruleville-based state senator Robert L. Crook that allowed Mississippi State Penitentiary (Parchman) employees to use up to $60 ($526.77 when adjusted for inflation) every month to pay for educational costs for their children. As a result some Parchman employees sent their children to North Sunflower Academy, and the State of Mississippi used general support funds to pay for some of North Sunflower Academy's transportation costs, including school buses, bus drivers, and gasoline. According to a November 1974 Delta Democrat Times article, the State of Mississippi spent over $250,000 (equivalent to $1,632,085 in 2025 when adjusted for inflation) in tuition costs and thousands of dollars in transportation costs for North Sunflower. By that time nobody had legally challenged that law in court. Constance Curry, author of Silver Rights, stated that it was legal under Mississippi law but may have been unconstitutional under U.S. federal law.

In 2002 the school had about 180 students, a decrease from its maximum of 200 from several years prior. Headmistress Sarah W. Love said that the lack of industry led to a decrease in students. Many families moved to Cleveland, Mississippi, where the public schools were considered to be better than those in other Mississippi Delta towns.

According to Charles Bussey, author of the 2004 book Where We Stand: Voices of Southern Dissent, the assistant superintendent of the North Sunflower Academy discussed with him high expulsion, suspension, and dropout rates in Drew High School, which at that time had become mostly black.

While the school now claims to be a non-discriminatory in regards to race or national origin, according to the National Center for Education Statistics the student body was composed of 135 white students out of a total 137 students, or 98.5% white as of the 2017-2018 school year.

== Athletics ==
The athletic teams participate using the nickname Rebels, a reference to the army Confederate States of America, which sought to maintain slavery of African-Americans. Their mascot is a Confederate Colonel.

== Campus ==
In 2013, the building had a Confederate flag on its side. The football field also was painted with a Confederate flag at least until 2015.

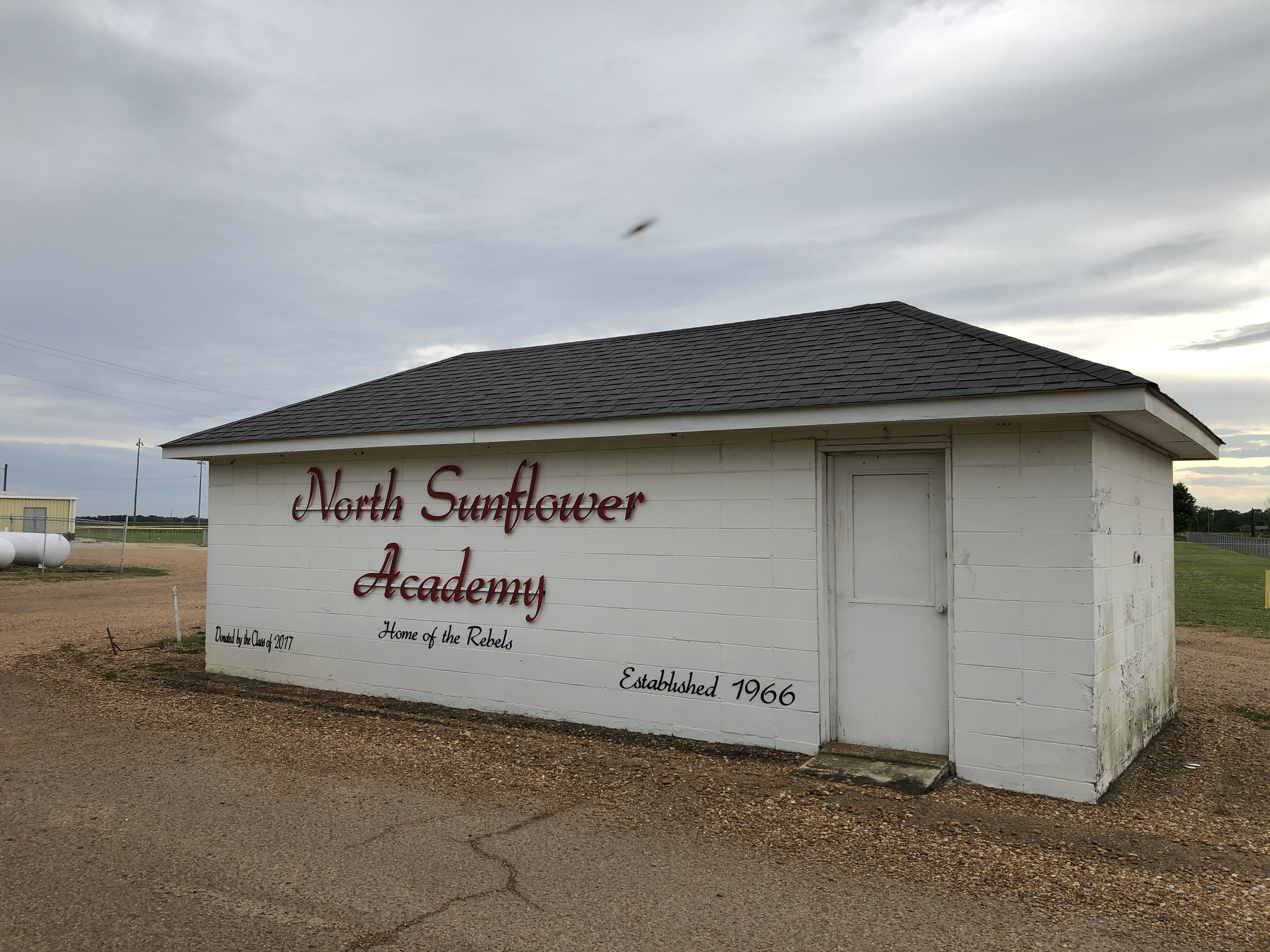
The pump house (no longer used) with a sign in Gabrielle font, donated by the Class of 2017, which replaced the old Confederate flag painting

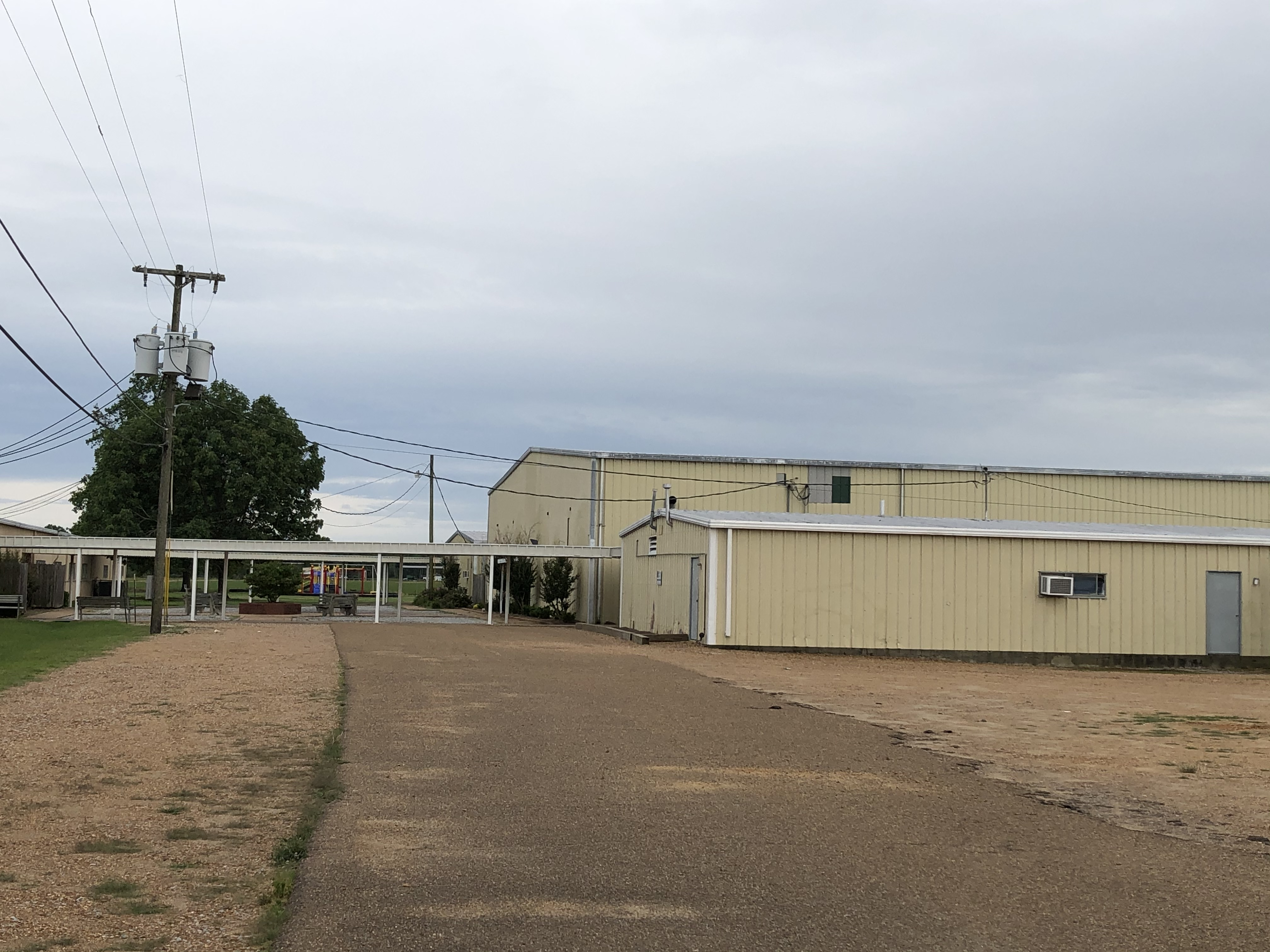
West of the main school building, the forward most building in the image is the field house, with the gym and cafeteria behind, respectively

== See also ==
- Thomas E. Edwards, Sr. High School
- Drew High School
- Indianola Academy
