= Drew School District =

Defunct school district in Mississippi, US

The Drew School District was a public school district based in Drew, Mississippi. The school district's attendance boundary included Drew, Rome, and the employee residences of the Mississippi State Penitentiary (Parchman), located in an unincorporated area. In July 2014, it was merged into the Sunflower County Consolidated School District.

== History ==
In 1967 civil rights activist Mae Bertha Carter and Marian Wright Edelman, a lawyer who worked for the NAACP Legal Defense and Educational Fund Inc., sued the Drew School District to challenge the Mississippi "freedom of choice" law. In 1969 the plaintiffs won the suit. Carter's children were the first black students to attend White schools in Drew. In 1969 a court order ended the segregation system in the Drew School District. The first African-American school board member was Doretha Williams.

After Drew School District was desegregated, White residents of Drew enrolled their children in North Sunflower Academy.

In 1986 a petition to merge the district with the Sunflower County School District circulated. John Q. West, a board member of the Drew School District, said during that year that "I'm afraid we're going to end up having neighbor against neighbor."

In June 2011 the Mississippi Board of Education voted to take over the Drew School District. In February 2012 the Mississippi Senate voted 43-4 to pass Senate Bill 2330, to consolidate the Drew School District, the Indianola School District, and the Sunflower County School District into one school district. The bill went to the Mississippi House of Representatives. Later that month, the State Board of Education approved the consolidation of the Drew School District and the Sunflower County School District, and if Senate Bill 2330 is approved, Indianola School District will be added. In May 2012 Governor of Mississippi Phil Bryant signed the bill into law, requiring all three districts to consolidate. SB2330 stipulates that if a county has three school districts all under conservatorship by the Mississippi Department of Education will have them consolidated into one school district serving the entire county.

In July 2014, the three school districts merged into the Sunflower County Consolidated School District. The district headquarters became the North Office of the county school district.

== Schools ==
At the time of closure, the district's schools were Drew Hunter High School and A.W. James Elementary School. Prior to the 2010-2011 school year the school district had three school buildings, including A.W. James Elementary School, Hunter Middle School, and Drew High School. James served K-4, Hunter served 5-8, and Drew High served 9-12. In 2010 the school district voted to close the Drew High School building and move the 5th and 6th grades to A.W. James. John Thigpen, the president of the school board, stated that the district operated as if it had 1,200 students when in fact it had 650. Effective August 1, 2011, all students will be required to wear school uniforms.

The high school division of Drew Hunter closed after the merger took its course. High school students were rezoned to Ruleville Central High School. The secondary school is now named Drew Hunter Middle School with grades 6-8.

== Demographics ==
In 2008, 90% of the students at Drew High School were black.

== Accountability statistics ==
	2006-07	2005-06	2004-05	2003-04	2002-03
District Accreditation Status	Accredited	Accredited	Accredited	Accredited	Advised
School Performance Classifications
Level 5 (Superior Performing) Schools	0	0	0	0	0
Level 4 (Exemplary) Schools	1	0	1	1	0
Level 3 (Successful) Schools	0	2	2	0	1
Level 2 (Under Performing) Schools	1	1	0	1	1
Level 1 (Low Performing) Schools	1	0	0	1	1
Not Assigned	0	0	0	0	0

== District profile and population ==
The Drew School district was in northern Sunflower County, in the central Mississippi Delta region and along U.S. Highway 49 West. The district consisted of 172.5 square miles (447 km^{2}) of farmland, and as of 2005 about 7,500 people lived within the boundaries of the district. The school district was in the center of an area surrounded by four larger towns, Clarksdale, Cleveland, Greenwood, and Indianola, which function as shopping centers. The school district's attendance boundary included Drew, Rome, and the employee residences of the Mississippi State Penitentiary (MSP, Parchman), located in an unincorporated area.

As of 2005 most adult residents of the district had high school diplomas or less education. Major employers included the school district, the Mississippi Department of Corrections (operator of MSP), and farming operations which produced beans, catfish, cotton, and rice. Some residents worked in factories and other businesses located in Clarksdale, Cleveland, Indianola, and Ruleville.

As of the same year within the district boundaries were two banks, about 20 churches, a National Guard armory, a library, and three parks. Three higher education institutions were within 30 miles (48 km) of the school district.

== See also ==
- List of school districts in Mississippi
