= Drew High School (Mississippi) =

Public school in Mississippi, US

Location
- Drew HS: 286 Green Avenue, Drew, MS 38737; Drew Hunter HS: 10 Swoope Road, Drew, MS 38737; 33°48′30.96″N 90°32′9.96″W

Information
- Type: Public
- Established: 1960s
- Closed: 2010
- Grades: 8–12
- Website: drewhighschool.com

Drew High School was a public high school located in Drew, Mississippi. It was a part of the Drew School District. The school district's attendance boundary included Drew, Rome, and the employee residences of the Mississippi State Penitentiary (Parchman), located in an unincorporated area. It served grades 9 through 12 and later grades 8 through 12.

== History ==
In the 1960s, seven children of the family of Mae Bertha Carter were the first black students to attend white schools in Drew. Archie Manning, an American football player who had attended Drew High School, recalled that there had been no violent incidents against the children but that the white students ignored the Carter children. According to Susan M. Glisson, author of The Human Tradition in the Civil Rights Movement, Ruth Carter, the oldest of the Carter children, encountered racial taunts involving the word "nigger", students avoiding her and moving out of her way, and students throwing spitballs. In 1969 a court order ended the segregation system in the Drew School District.

By 1971 black students were the majority of Drew High School, with four black students for every one white student. After Drew School District was desegregated, white residents of Drew enrolled their children in North Sunflower Academy. White teachers also left the school.

In 1997 Ned Tolliver Jr. came out of retirement to be the principal of Drew High.

Prior to the 2010–11 school year the school district had three school buildings, with Drew High School being one of them. In 2010 the school district voted to close the Drew High School building and move the 5th and 6th grades to A.W. James. John Thigpen, the president of the school board, stated that the district operated as if it had 1,200 students when in fact it had 650. Drew Hunter High School began serving secondary grades.

The Drew School District closed in 2012 and the high school-level students who attended Drew Hunter were moved to Ruleville Central High School. The secondary school is now named Drew Hunter Middle School, with grades 6 through 8.

== Student discipline ==
According to Charles Bussey, author of the 2004 book Where We Stand: Voices Of Southern Dissent, the assistant superintendent of the North Sunflower Academy discussed with him high expulsion, suspension, and dropout rates in Drew High School, which at that time had become mostly black.

== Notable alumni ==
- Joetha Collier (1971) – Victim of a shooting the day of her graduation
- Archie Manning (1967) – American football quarterback
