= Thomas E. Edwards, Sr. High School =

Location
- 360 L. F. Packer Drive; Ruleville, Mississippi 38771; United States; 33.728346°N 90.543078°W

Information
- Type: Comprehensive public high school
- School district: Sunflower County School District
- Superintendent: John W. Sullivan
- Principal: Eric Lakes
- Teaching staff: 30.41 (FTE)
- Grades: 9–12
- Enrollment: 337 (2023–2024)
- Student to teacher ratio: 11.08
- Colors: Kelly green and Packer gold
- Mascot: Tigers
- Feeder schools: Drew Hunter Middle School; Moorhead Middle School; Ruleville Middle School
- Website: rchs.sunflower.k12.ms.us

Thomas E. Edwards, Sr. High School, formerly Ruleville Central High School (RCHS), is a public high school located in Ruleville, Mississippi, United States. It is a part of the Sunflower County Consolidated School District and had 381 students enrolled in November 2012.

The school serves communities of Sunflower County, including the cities of Drew, Moorhead, Ruleville, and the Sunflower County portion of Shaw; the towns of Doddsville, Inverness, and Sunflower; and several unincorporated communities including Rome, and the employee residences of nearby Mississippi State Penitentiary. The principal is Eric Lakes.

== History ==
Ruleville Central High School was originally named Ruleville Colored School. In the early 1930s, noted Mississippi artist Bailey Magnet created bas-relief sculptures for the school.

The city of Ruleville was home to civil rights leader Fannie Lou Hamer. After her death in 1977, an overflow memorial service accommodating people who could not attend the primary memorial service at a church was held at Ruleville Central, with over 1,500 people in attendance. Andrew Young, the United States Ambassador to the United Nations, spoke at the RCHS service.

In 1998, a tornado caused extensive damage to classrooms and the gymnasium, with 1 inch (2.5 cm) of water flooding. Principal Jimmy Smith estimated $1 million as a "conservative" estimate of damage, and Mayor Harvey Springer added that looters had entered the school.

Dorothy Burton served as principal from circa 1999 to her retirement in spring 2002.

Noah Ingram, a student at RCHS, rushed for a state-record 506 yards and six touchdowns during a September 2000 football game against Gentry High School.

In September 2006, tragedy struck the school when one of its students, Robert Cassidy, was paralyzed from the chest down on the opening kickoff of a football game against Gentry High School. Cassidy's injuries garnered an outpouring of support from the community.

On July 1, 2012, nearby Drew School District was consolidated into the Sunflower County School District. As a result, the Sunflower County School District's attendance boundary expanded, and the high school division of Drew Hunter High School was closed, with its high school students rezoned to Ruleville Central.

Notable teaching staff include former Olympic basketball player Lusia Harris. As well, veteran teacher Cordina Barber was the recipient of a Shine-A-Light award from Black Entertainment Television in recognition of her work with the schools' Parent Teacher Student Association to organize a two-day student boycott in March 2010 to draw attention to the school's conditions.

In 2018 the district announced that the school will be renamed for Thomas Edwards, after a previous superintendent. Every member of the board voted for the rename. However, community members filed lawsuits against the school district to try to force the name to be changed back.
