= Mae Bertha Carter =

American civil rights activist (1923–1999)

Mae Bertha Carter (January 13, 1923 – April 28, 1999) was an activist during the Civil Rights Movement from Drew, Mississippi.

Carter was born on January 13, 1923, in Sunflower County, Mississippi. In 1943 Mae Bertha married Mathew Carter, with whom she had thirteen children. In Sunflower County she enrolled 7 of her 13 children in schools previously reserved for Whites in the fall of 1965. She continued to keep her children in the schools even though a person fired bullets into her house, and even though her landlord evicted her and her family. Carter and Marian Wright Edelman, a lawyer who worked for the NAACP Legal Defense and Educational Fund Inc., sued the Drew School District to challenge the Mississippi "freedom of choice" law. In 1969 the plaintiffs won the suit. In 1969 a court order ended the segregation system in the Drew School District. All seven of her children graduated from the previously all-White Drew High School. Mae Bertha Carter credits a woman named Hattie Leggett with being the person who most influenced her life. She died in her home in Drew on April 28, 1999.

Mrs. Carter is the central figure in Constance Curry's book Silver Rights (1995, Algonquin Books of Chapel Hill).

== See also ==
- Educational segregation in Sunflower County, Mississippi
- African Americans in Mississippi
