= Malcolm Norwood (artist) =

American painter, ceramist and educator

- Born: January 21, 1928; Drew, Mississippi, U.S.
- Died: August 11, 2009 (aged 81); Hattiesburg, Mississippi, U.S.
- Education: Mississippi College; University of Alabama
- Occupations: Painter, ceramist, educator
- Spouse: Mary Claire Sugg
- Children: 2 sons, 1 daughter

Malcolm Norwood (January 21, 1928 - August 11, 2009) was an American painter, ceramist and educator. He taught at Delta State University from 1962 to 1990, and he was the recipient of the Governor's Award for Excellence in the Arts in 1991.

== Life ==
Norwood was born on January 21, 1928, in Drew, Mississippi. He earned a bachelor of arts degree and a master's degree in education from Mississippi College, followed by a master's in fine arts from the University of Alabama.

Norwood was a high school teacher in Jackson for ten years. He taught at Delta State University in Cleveland, Mississippi from 1962 to 1990, and he served as the chair of its Art Department. He was also a painter and a ceramist in his own right, and he co-authored a book about Marie Hull. He helped establish the Crosstie Arts Council in Cleveland, Mississippi, and he served on the Mississippi Arts Commission. He received the Governor's Award for Excellence in the Arts in 1991. He was the subject of a retrospective at the Fielding L. Wright Art Center on the DSU campus in 1995.

With his wife née Mary Claire Sugg, Norwood had two sons and a daughter. He died on August 11, 2009, in Hattiesburg, Mississippi, and he was buried in New Cleveland Cemetery in Cleveland, Mississippi.

== Works ==
- Norwood, Malcolm M.; Elias, Virginia McGehee; Haynie, William S. (1975). The Art of Marie Hull. Jackson, Mississippi: University Press of Mississippi. OCLC 707603059.
