= Drew, Mississippi =

- City
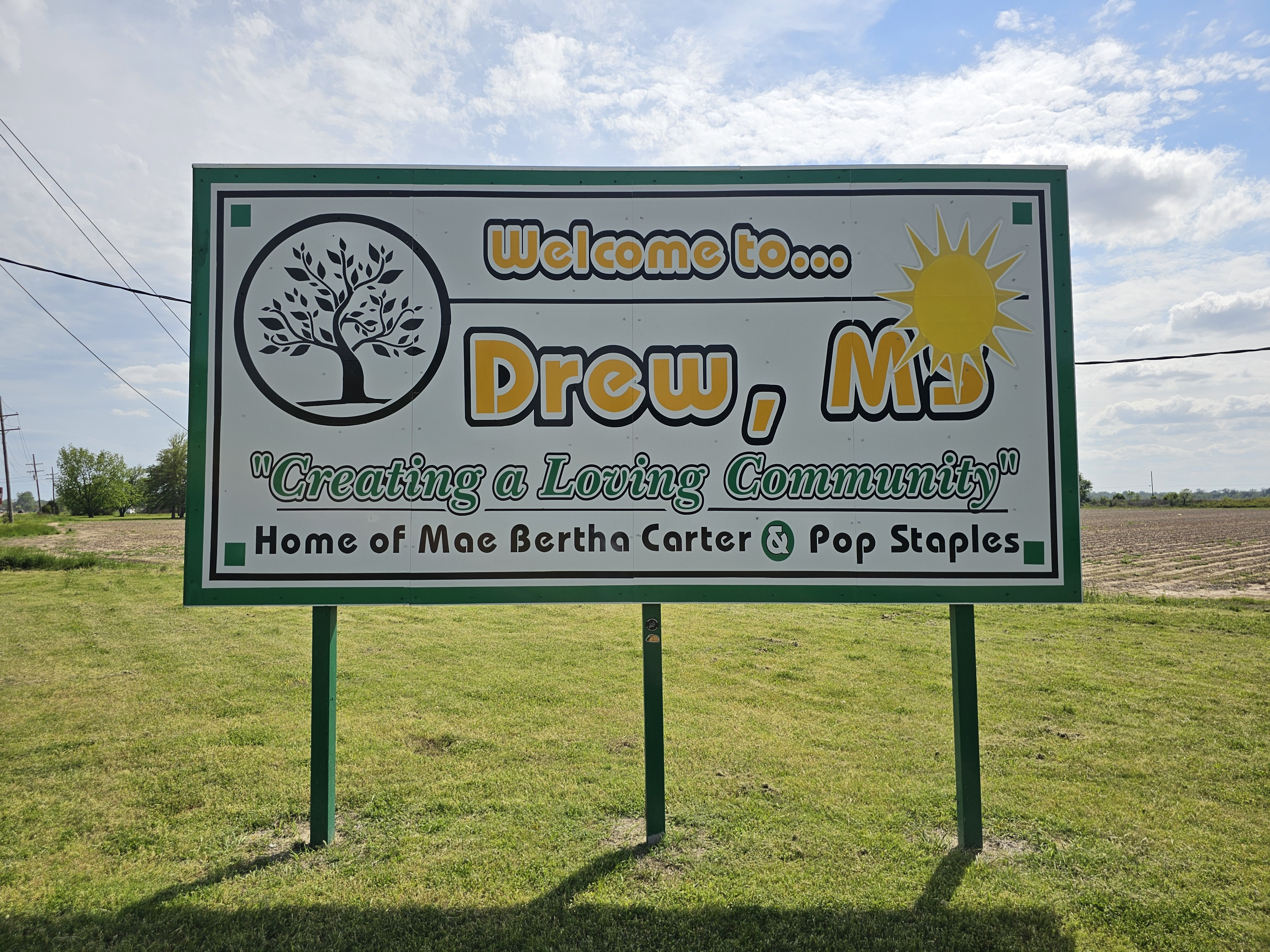
- Welcome sign in Drew
- Motto: "Creating A Loving Community"
- Location of Drew, Mississippi

- Location in the United States
- Coordinates: 33°48′36″N 90°31′49″W
- Country: United States
- State: Mississippi
- County: Sunflower

Area
  - Total: 1.12 sq mi (2.91 km^{2})
  - Land: 1.12 sq mi (2.91 km^{2})
  - Water: 0 sq mi (0.00 km^{2})
- Elevation: 138 ft (42 m)

Population (2020)
  - Total: 1,852
  - Density: 1,650.7/sq mi (637.33/km^{2})
- Time zone: UTC-6 (Central (CST))
  - Summer (DST): UTC-5 (CDT)
- ZIP codes: 38737-38738
- Area code: 662
- FIPS code: 28-20020
- GNIS feature ID: 2403508

Drew is a city in Sunflower County, Mississippi, United States. As of the 2020 census, Drew had a population of 1,852. Drew is in the vicinity of several plantations and the Mississippi State Penitentiary, a Mississippi Department of Corrections prison for men. It is noted for being the site of several racist murders, including the lynching of Joe Pullen in 1923 and of Emmett Till in 1955.

== History ==
When the Yellow Dog Railroad was extended through what is now Drew, the post office was moved from the Promised Land Plantation to the Drew location. The settlement and the post office were named for Miss Drew Daniel, daughter of Andrew Jackson Daniel.

A school called the Little Red Schoolhouse was built by matching funds from the Rosenwald Fund in 1928. In the 21st century it received a grant for renovation of the large school.

In the 1920s, a man named Joe Pullen was lynched near Drew after killing at least three members and wounding other members of a posse seeking him after he shot and killed another man.

One historian wrote that the white residents of Drew had "traditionally been regarded as the most recalcitrant in the county on racial matters." The author wrote that whites in Drew were "considered the most recalcitrant of Sunflower County, and perhaps the state." He also claimed that Drew's proximity to the Mississippi State Penitentiary made Drew "a dangerous place to be black", and claimed that during the 1930s and 1940s many police officers arbitrarily shot blacks, saying that they appeared to look like escaped prisoners. That historian also claimed that during the Civil Rights Movement, when attempts were made to move Fannie Lou Hamer's movement for poor people from Ruleville to Drew, the organizers "faced stiff resistance". Mae Bertha Carter, an activist during the Civil Rights Movement, was from Drew.

In 1955, 14-year-old African-American teenager Emmett Louis Till was abducted, tortured, and shot to death in a barn near Drew. The killing attracted national attention. Some locals have raised money to purchase the barn for a memorial.

== Geography ==
According to the United States Census Bureau, the city has a total area of 1.1 square miles (2.8 km^{2}), all land. Because of its small size, Billy Turner of The Times-Picayune said "[y]ou can travel all over town in a few minutes." Drew is in the vicinity of several plantations and the Mississippi State Penitentiary (Parchman), a Mississippi Department of Corrections prison for men.

Drew, in northern Sunflower County, is located on U.S. Route 49W, on the route between Jackson and Clarksdale. Drew is 8 miles (13 km) south of the Mississippi State Penitentiary, and it is north of Ruleville. Cleveland, Mississippi is 12 miles (19 km) from Drew. Drew is north of Yazoo City.

Many houses in Drew are government-owned. Some houses sold for $6,000 to $8,000 in the year until 2008. Some Drew residents stated in 2008 that, if put on the market, some houses would sell for over $120,000.

== Demographics ==
Historical population
Census	Pop.	Note	%±
1900	195		—
1910	278		42.6%
1920	721		159.4%
1930	1,373		90.4%
1940	1,579		15.0%
1950	1,681		6.5%
1960	2,143		27.5%
1970	2,574		20.1%
1980	2,528		−1.8%
1990	2,349		−7.1%
2000	2,434		3.6%
2010	1,927		−20.8%
2020	1,852		−3.9%
U.S. Decennial Census

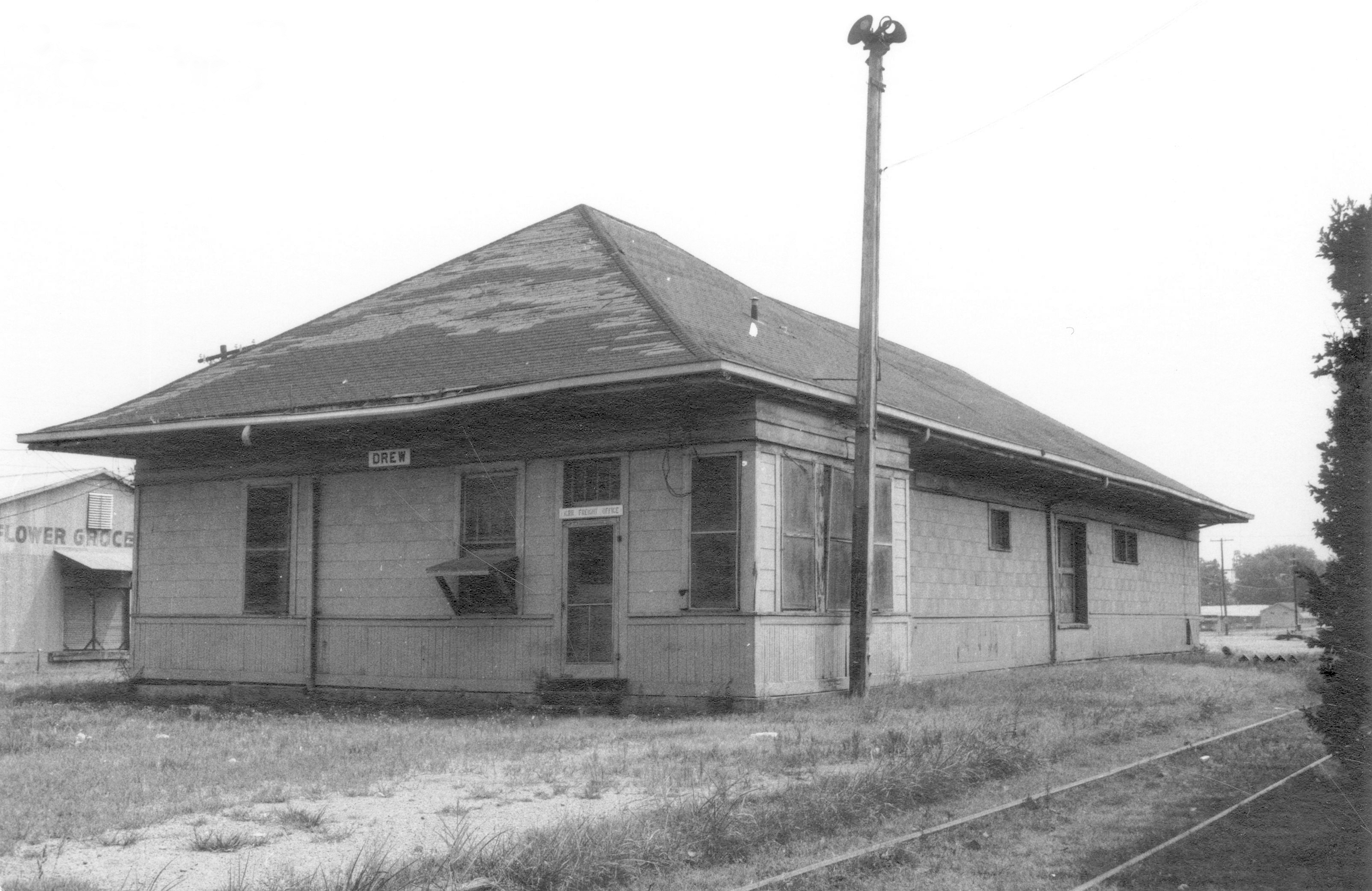
Train depot in Drew, 1976

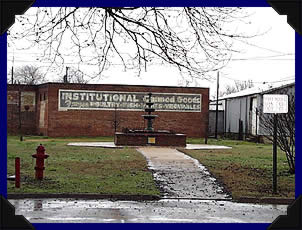
The Drew Town Square

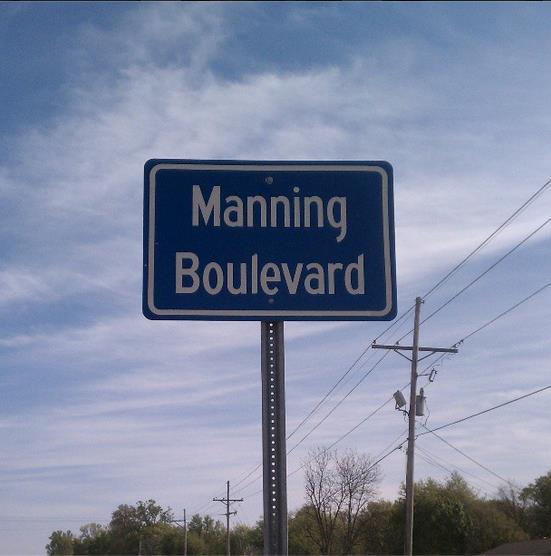
Manning Boulevard, named after Archie Manning

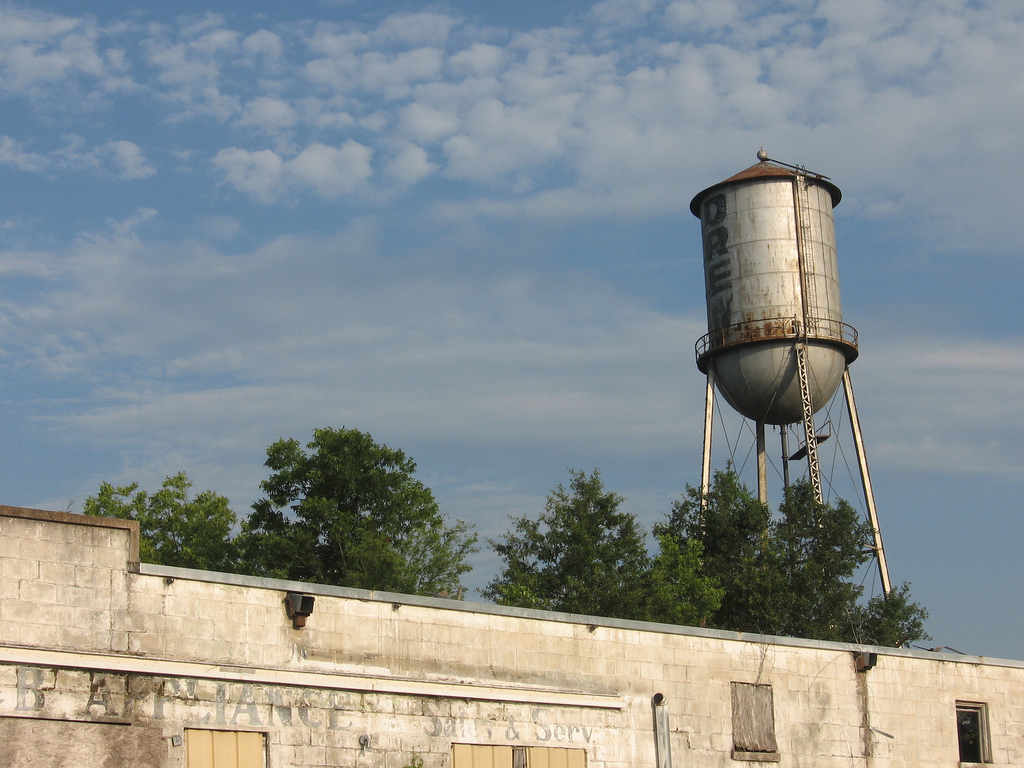
Water tower in Drew

=== Racial and ethnic composition ===
Drew city, Mississippi – Racial and ethnic composition Note: the US Census treats Hispanic/Latino as an ethnic category. This table excludes Latinos from the racial categories and assigns them to a separate category. Hispanics/Latinos may be of any race.
Race / Ethnicity (NH = Non-Hispanic)	Pop 2000	Pop 2010	Pop 2020	% 2000	% 2010	% 2020
White alone (NH)	612	308	198	25.14%	15.98%	10.69%
Black or African American alone (NH)	1,771	1,594	1,573	72.76%	82.72%	84.94%
Native American or Alaska Native alone (NH)	1	3	5	0.04%	0.16%	0.27%
Asian alone (NH)	4	4	3	0.16%	0.21%	0.16%
Native Hawaiian or Pacific Islander alone (NH)	0	0	0	0.00%	0.00%	0.00%
Other race alone (NH)	1	0	5	0.04%	0.00%	0.27%
Mixed race or Multiracial (NH)	7	4	39	0.29%	0.21%	2.11%
Hispanic or Latino (any race)	38	14	29	1.56%	0.73%	1.57%
Total	2,434	1,927	1,852	100.00%	100.00%	100.00%

=== 2020 census ===
As of the 2020 census, Drew had a population of 1,852. The median age was 31.4 years. 32.1% of residents were under the age of 18 and 13.6% of residents were 65 years of age or older. For every 100 females there were 82.5 males, and for every 100 females age 18 and over there were 75.7 males age 18 and over.

0.0% of residents lived in urban areas, while 100.0% lived in rural areas.

There were 714 households and 503 families in Drew, of which 38.5% had children under the age of 18 living in them. Of all households, 23.2% were married-couple households, 19.0% were households with a male householder and no spouse or partner present, and 51.5% were households with a female householder and no spouse or partner present. About 33.0% of all households were made up of individuals and 13.7% had someone living alone who was 65 years of age or older.

There were 812 housing units, of which 12.1% were vacant. The homeowner vacancy rate was 1.5% and the rental vacancy rate was 8.9%.

Racial composition as of the 2020 census
Race	Number	Percent
White	199	10.7%
Black or African American	1,583	85.5%
American Indian and Alaska Native	5	0.3%
Asian	3	0.2%
Native Hawaiian and Other Pacific Islander	0	0.0%
Some other race	20	1.1%
Two or more races	42	2.3%

=== 2010 census ===
As of the 2010 United States census, there were 1,927 people living in the city. The racial makeup of the city was 82.7% Black, 16.0% White, 0.2% Native American, 0.2% Asian and 0.2% from two or more races. 0.7% were Hispanic or Latino of any race.

=== 2000 census ===
As of the census of 2000, there were 2,434 people, 811 households, and 606 families living in the city. The population density was 2,172.6 inhabitants per square mile (838.8/km^{2}). There were 922 housing units at an average density of 823.0 per square mile (317.8/km^{2}). The racial makeup of the city was 25.27% White, 73.58% African American, 0.12% Native American, 0.16% Asian, 0.37% from other races, and 0.49% from two or more races. Hispanic or Latino of any race were 1.56% of the population.

There were 811 households, out of which 42.4% had children under the age of 18 living with them, 35.3% were married couples living together, 35.4% had a female householder with no husband present, and 25.2% were non-families. 21.6% of all households were made up of individuals, and 10.7% had someone living alone who was 65 years of age or older. The average household size was 3.00 and the average family size was 3.51.

In the city, the population was spread out, with 36.6% under the age of 18, 10.1% from 18 to 24, 26.2% from 25 to 44, 16.2% from 45 to 64, and 10.8% who were 65 years of age or older. The median age was 27 years. For every 100 females, there were 82.9 males. For every 100 females age 18 and over, there were 71.9 males.

The median income for a household in the city was $19,167, and the median income for a family was $20,469. Males had a median income of $22,351 versus $18,693 for females. The per capita income for the city was $8,569. About 36.1% of families and 40.5% of the population were below the poverty line, including 54.6% of those under age 18 and 23.0% of those age 65 or over.

== Economy ==
At one time, Drew was the locality in the United States that had the most cotton gins. In 2008, it only had one cotton gin. Billy Turner of The Times-Picayune said "[t]here's some corn, some beans, but mostly, there's no business." By 2012 the SuperValu grocery store had closed. Melanie Townsend, a woman quoted in a 2012 Bolivar Commercial article, said that since the grocery store closed, few employment opportunities were available in Drew and that the Drew School District was the largest employer in the area.

== Education ==
Drew was first served by the predominantly African-American Drew School District. The City of Drew is currently served by the Sunflower County Consolidated School District. Elementary and middle school students attend schools in Drew: A. W. James Elementary School (K-5) and Drew Hunter Middle School (6–8). High school students attend Ruleville Central High School in Ruleville. Formerly Drew High School was the comprehensive high school of Drew.

The North Sunflower Academy is in an unincorporated area of Sunflower County, about 3 miles (4.8 km) south of Drew. The school originated as a segregation academy, Mississippi Delta Community College has the Drew Center in Drew.

The Sunflower County Library operates the Drew Public Library.

== Transportation ==
Ruleville-Drew Airport is in unincorporated Sunflower County, between Drew and Ruleville. The airport is jointly operated by the cities of Drew and Ruleville.

== Notable people ==
- Mae Bertha Carter, civil rights activist
- Boo Boo Davis, blues singer who released an album entitled Drew, Mississippi
- Al Dixon, former NFL tight end
- Harold Dorman, rock and roll singer and songwriter
- Hester Jackson-McCray, member of the Mississippi House of Representatives
- Willie Louis, born Willie Reed, witness to the murder of Emmett Till
- Archie Manning, former NFL quarterback, patriarch of the Manning family
- Cleve McDowell, civil rights activist and lawyer. First African American to enroll at the University of Mississippi School of Law
- Malcolm Norwood, painter, ceramist, educator
- Billy Stacy, former NFL safety
- Pops Staples and Cleotha Staples, members of the Staple Singers

== See also ==
- Killing of Joetha Collier – 1971 homicide that occurred in the city
