= Pentecost (disambiguation) =

Pentecost is one of the prominent feasts in the Christian liturgical year.

It is also one of the English-language names for the Jewish holiday of Shavuot.

Pentecost may also refer to:

== Other religious and cultural events ==
- Pinksteren (Dutch word meaning "Pentecost"), often pronounced in English as "Pinkster"

== Places ==
- Pentecost, Mississippi, U.S.
- Pentecost Island, one of the islands of Vanuatu
- Pentecost River, a river in Western Australia

== People ==
- Pentecost Dodderidge (died c. 1650), MP for Barnstaple, England
- Denie Pentecost (born 1970), Australian footballer
- George Frederick Pentecost (1842–1920), American evangelist
- Hugh O. Pentecost (1848–1907), American minister, editor, lawyer, and lecturer
- J. Dwight Pentecost (1915–2014), American theologian
- Max Pentecost (born 1993), American baseball player
- Del Pentecost (born 1963), American actor and cast member of the 2008 play Almost an Evening

== Arts, entertainment, and media ==
- Pentecost (El Greco), one of the canvasses that composed the Doña María de Aragón Altarpiece by El Greco
- Pentecost (film), a 2011 Irish live action short film
- Pentecost (Moretto), a 1543-1544 painting by Moretto da Brescia
- Pentecost (play), a 1994 British dramatic play
- Pentecost III, an EP by the British doom metal band Anathema

== Other uses ==
- Pentecost University College, Sowutuom, Ghana

== See also ==
- Pentecostalism, a Protestant Christian movement
