= Aaron H. Forrest =

American slave trader, Confederate officer (~1828–1864)

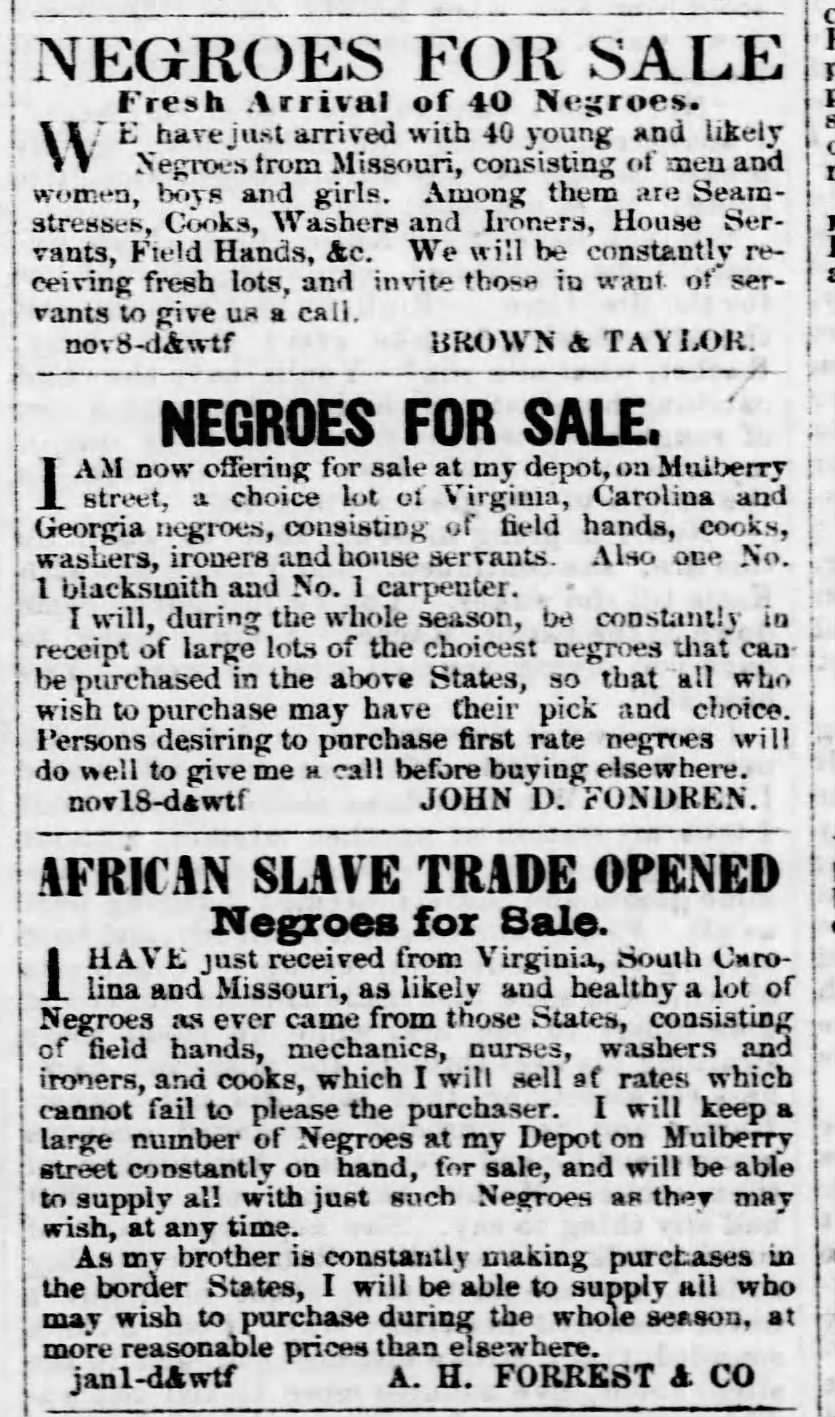
- "Negroes for Sale", Vicksburg Whig, March 21, 1860
- Born: c. 1830; Mississippi, U.S.
- Died: April 1864
- Other name: A. H. Forrest
- Occupation: Slave trader

Aaron H. Forrest (c. 1830 – April 1864) was one of the six Forrest brothers who engaged in the interregional slave trade in the United States prior to the American Civil War. He may have also owned or managed cotton plantations in Mississippi. He led a Confederate cavalry unit composed of volunteers from the Yazoo River region of Mississippi during the American Civil War. He died in 1864, apparently from illness.

== Slave trading ==
Nathan Bedford Forrest's five younger brothers were "ideal junior partners" who contributed to a "building a formidable slave-trading operation." Aaron Forrest was described in a highly critical anti-Forrest article of 1864 as "general agent and soul driver" for the business.

Aaron Forrest started working for his brother Nathan Bedford Forrest's slave-trading business in or before 1855. That year he was listed as a clerk in the Memphis city directory, and was recorded as a visitor to Shreveport, Louisiana. In 1856, a newspaper ad placed by the jailor of Dickson County, Tennessee stated that, according to a "quite intelligent" enslaved man named Frank, Aaron Forrest lived in Memphis, bought people in (among other places) Nicholas County, Kentucky, and had been near Coffeeville, Mississippi, on or around April 30, 1856. For the fiscal year 1857, as a "transient vender" A. H. Forrest paid extra taxes to Warren County, Mississippi (county seat, Vicksburg) on sales of US$5,870 (equivalent to $202,829 in 2025). In March 1858, there were letters waiting for A. H. Forrest and William H. Forrest at the Vicksburg post office.

In Slave-Trading in the Old South (1931), historian Frederic Bancroft described the city of New Orleans, Louisiana, located at the mouth of the Mississippi River, as "mistress of the trade" and "the trader's paradise." Aaron Forrest was apparently not unfamiliar with the city, as in January 1858, he was a registered guest of the City Hotel in New Orleans. In April 1858, A. H. Forrest was a registered guest of the St. Charles Hotel in New Orleans. In May 1859 the New Orleans Times-Picayune reported on a case involving the Forrest brothers that had come to the Louisiana Supreme Court:

N. B. & A. H. Forrest, appellees, vs. W. S. Miller, appellant. No. 6072. Appeal from the Tenth Judicial District Court, parish of Tensas. This is a redhibitory suit to recover the price of a negro said to be affected with the vice of running away. It was clear to the court that the negro was sold to the plaintiff, at Memphis, on account of his habit of running away. He ran away from the purchaser, and when discovered by the overseer of his new master, ran directly into the Mississippi river and was drowned. Judgment of the lower court therefore avoided and reverted."

=== A. H. Forrest & Co. ===
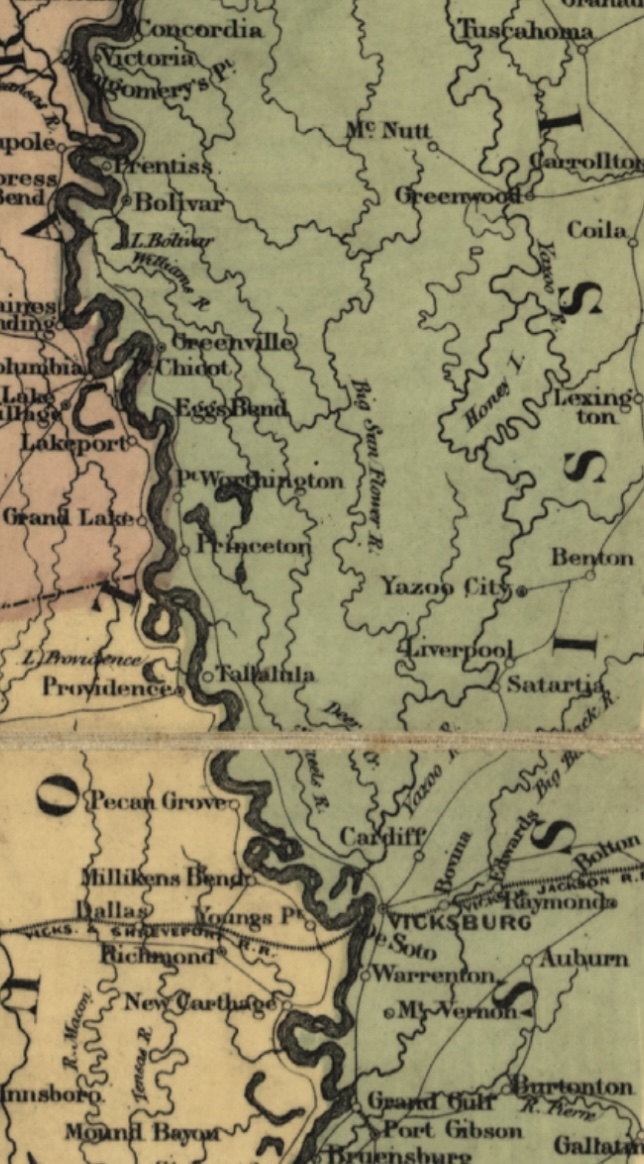
Map of the area surrounding Vicksburg in 1862, including railroad lines, Big Sunflower River, location of McNutt and Yazoo City, etc. (Colton's Plans of U.S. Harbors via Library of Congress Digital)

In around 1858, A. H. Forrest & Co. began operating in Vicksburg, Mississippi. According to Forrest biographer Hurst, "For eighteen months or more, that firm—often using the aid of other Forrest brothers—imported sizable 'gangs' of slaves, significant numbers of them from Missouri and evidently bought there by William H. (Bill) Forrest, who was active in St. Louis." In autumn 1859, perhaps to avoid taxes on "transient venders" such as he paid in 1857, Aaron Forrest began advertising that he had a slave depot in a fixed location in Mississippi, namely a site on Mulberry Street, Vicksburg, a block or two inland from the Yazoo River. As Bancroft described the ads for this site, "Forrest could 'supply all [patrons] with just such Negroes as they may wish at any time', for, as he added, 'my Brother is constantly making purchases in the border States'. It is supposed that this A. H. Forrest was Aaron H., and that 'my Brother' was the well-known Nathan Bedford Forrest...It seems hardly within the range of possibility that there could have been two A. H. Forrests, each with a great-trader brother. It is much more likely that this firm, buying and selling in special regions, was only a branch of the main business centered in Memphis." In addition to advertising in Vicksburg, Aaron Forrest placed ads for this slave depot in newspapers in the Mississippi state capital, Jackson, announcing newly trafficked stock "consisting of field hands, mechanics, nurses, washers and ironers, and cooks, which I will sell at rates which cannot fail to please the purchaser." In 1860, A. H. Forest & Co. announced the arrival of "40 likely young negroes" including a "No. 1 Carpenter and a Blacksmith."

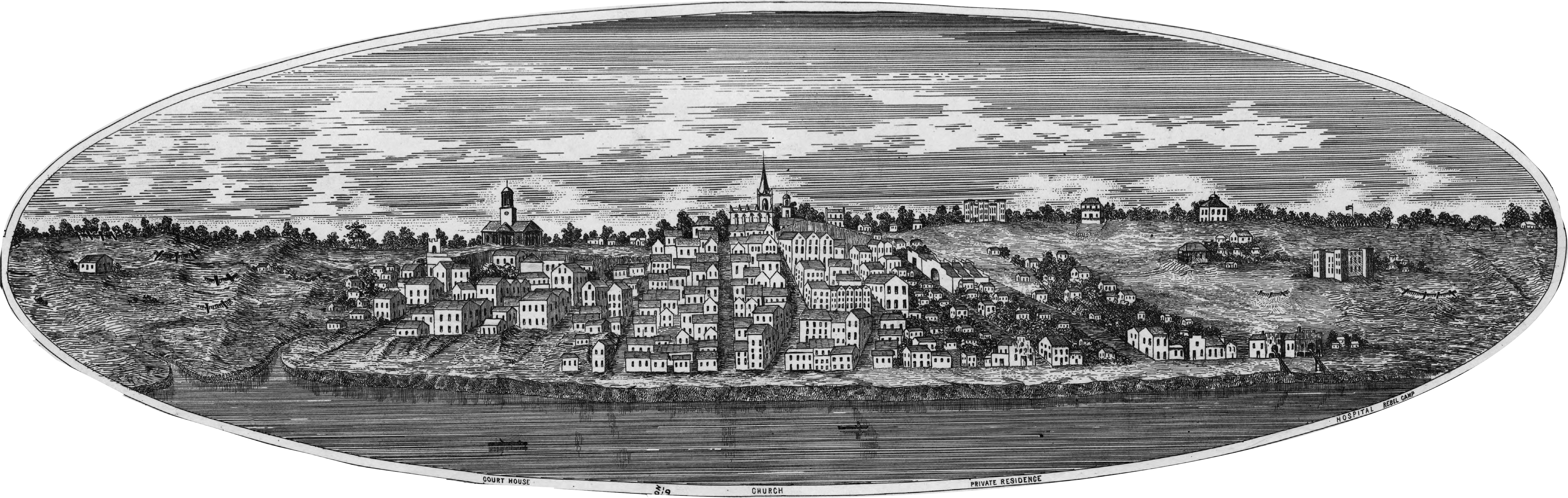
"View of Vicksburg" created by U.S. Army cartographers at the time of the 1863 Siege of Vicksburg

The conspicuous advertisement of 1860 that promised "African slave trade reopened" may be a winking reference to Nathan Bedford Forrest's involvement in the criminal trafficking of slaves from Africa on the Wanderer. The official U.S. government investigator wrote James Buchanan: "At Vicksburg I learned from good authority that 30 of the Wanderer's cargo had been brought to that place last Spring and Sold by Forest & Co., Slave-dealers...At Memphis, I was informed at the negro depot of Byrd Hill that 7 Africans had been sold there last Spring by one Forest, (Hill's predecessor). These were of the Wanderer's cargo, and were all that were sold in Memphis and all in fact which have been there. These statements were corroborated by reliable gentlemen, residents of Memphis, and personal friends of mine. I have no hesitancy in affirming their truth."

There are no records for A. H. Forrest & Co. slave sales in Warren County, Mississippi after 1860.

== Plantations ==
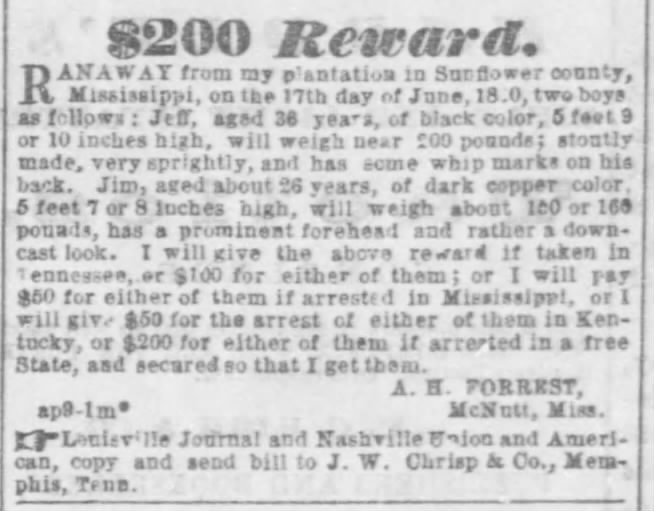
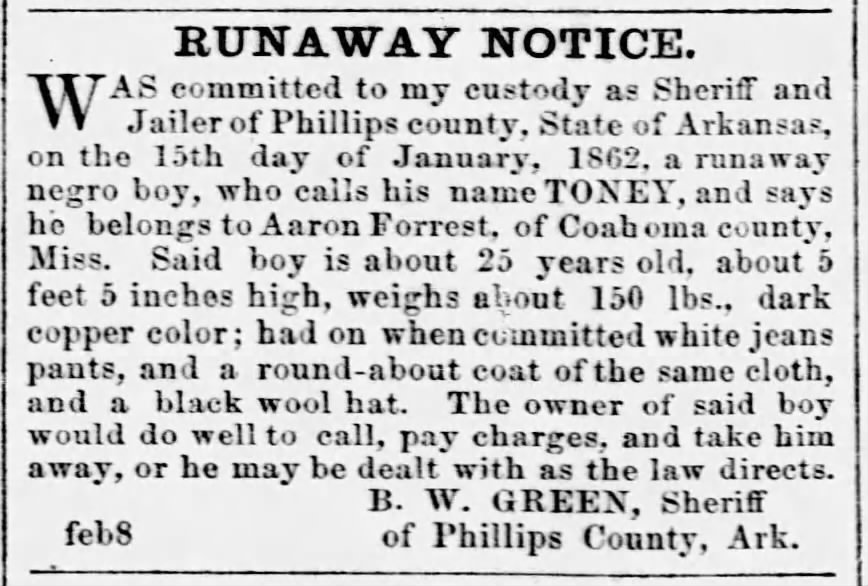

Two Civil War-era advertisements related to three lost and found enslaved men (Jim, Jeff, and Toney) who had been legally owned by Aaron Forrest hint that he owned or managed plantations near in Coahoma County, Mississippi, (Note: According to the 1860 census slave schedules, Nathan Bedford Forrest had a plantation in Coahoma County worked by 36 enslaved people who shared 12 houses.) and/or near McNutt, Mississippi, in what was then Sunflower County and is now LaFlore County, Mississippi.

== American Civil War ==
During the American Civil War, Aaron Forrest led an independent company of volunteers known as the Sunflower Rangers, which was reportedly organized August 1862. A database of Confederate officers records Aaron H. Forrest as the captain of an unidentified company of the 6th Mississippi Cavalry. In February 1863, Forrest's command was called the Cavalry Company of the 6th Battalion, Mississippi State Troops. Forrest was reportedly commanding a battalion in April 1863. Dunbar Rowland's Military History of Mississippi (1908) has two relevant entries:

- "FORREST'S BATTALION. 'Sixth Battalion Mississippi State troops, Capt. A. H. Forrest, near Carrollton, 150 men.' General Chalmers' report at time of Federal raid to Grenada, August, 1863"
- Under the heading "VARIOUS COMPANIES, STATE TROOPS" describes "Sunflower Rangers, of Sunflower County, organized as independent cavalry 9 August 1862. Captain: A. H. Farrar. Lieutenants: S. H. Rogers, F. W. Goff, D. C. Portwood."

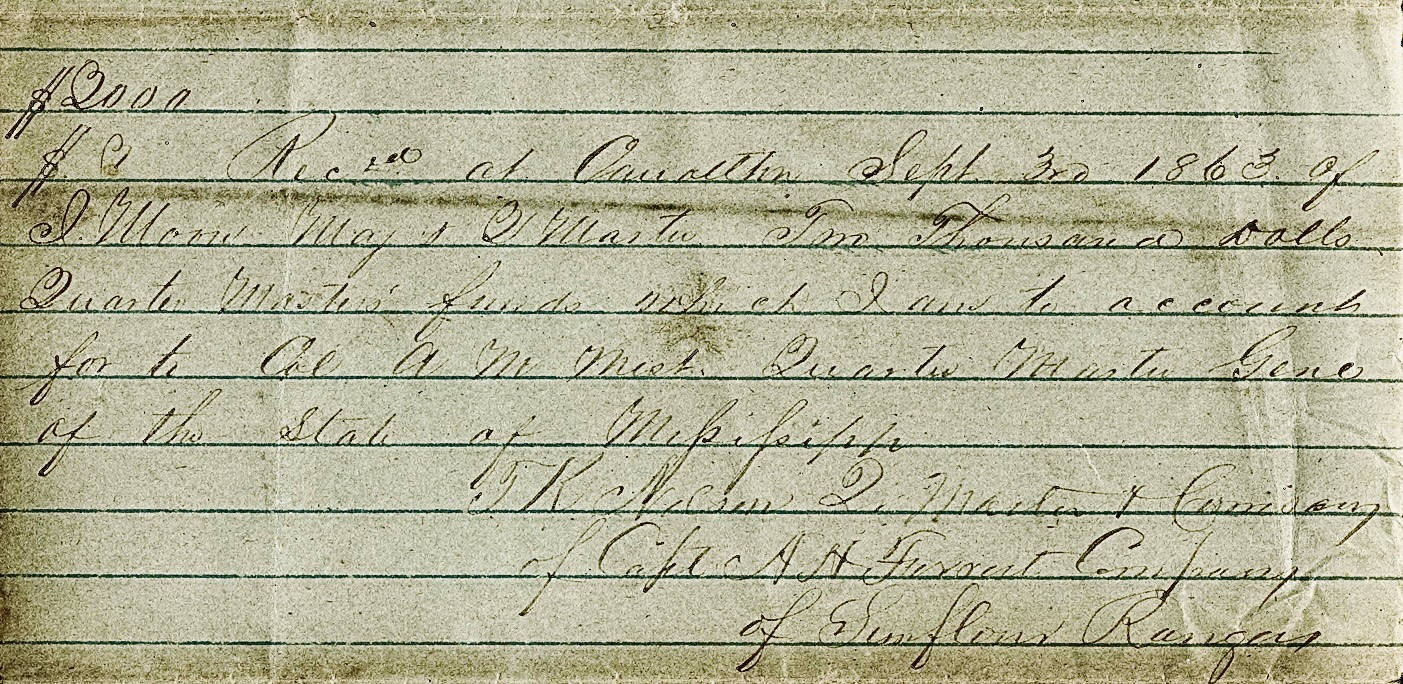
Receipt dated September 1863, acknowledging $2,000 issued to T.K. Nelson, Quartermaster, Captain A. H. Forrest's Company of Sunflower Rangers (Rosemonde E. & Emile Kuntz collection, Tulane University Libraries)

In 1908, a Memphis Appeal newspaper article by W. F. Hamilton of Carrollton, Mississippi, entitled "Memories of the War" stated, "There was a company of cavalry which was organized principally in Sunflower county and commanded by Capt. Aaron Forrest which rendered valuable service. Having lived in the swamp section of the state they were good boatmen and knowing the country they kept the enemy always in view and reported every movement of the enemy. They were fighting for their own homes and their carbines brought down many of McClernand's men off their boats and their bullets, entering through portholes of the gunboats, slew some of their gunners. Some of Capt. Forrest's men may be living today and are proud of the record for service that they made."

Years after the war was over a veteran told a story of Forrest's company lying in wait to engage the Yazoo Pass expedition but being startled into retreat by a troop of feral hogs that they thought were U.S. troops approaching from their rear. During an encounter with the 5th Illinois Cavalry during the same expedition, the Sunflower Rangers were apparently startled to discover that Yankees would set foot in their swamp; a skirmish resulted in six Confederate deaths, three injuries, 15 taken prisoner, and some number of captured horses.

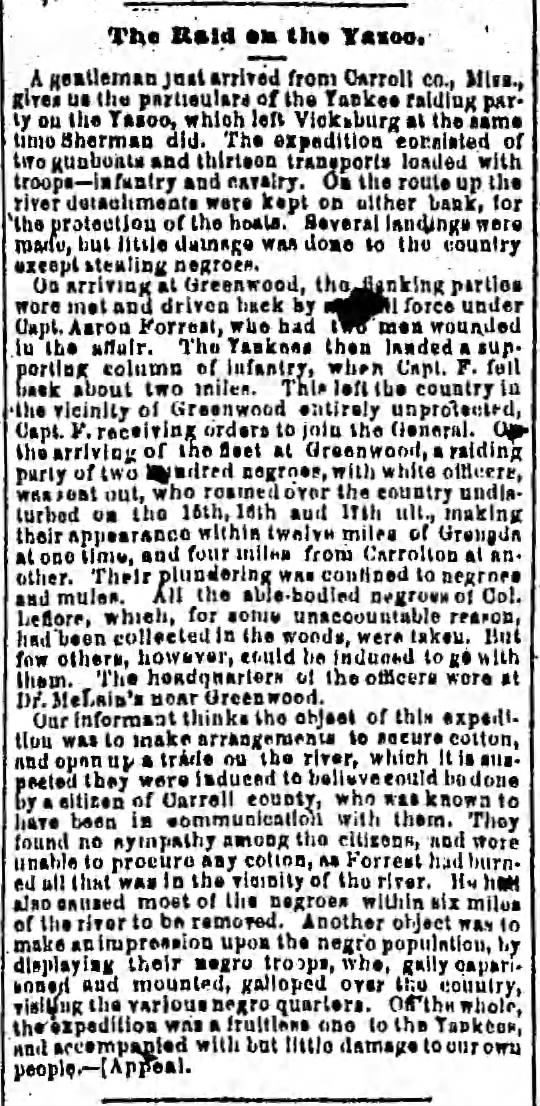
This Confederate-perspective news account of the Battle of Yazoo City describes the defense of Greenwood by A. Forrest's troops ("The Raid on the Yazoo" Advertiser and Register, Mobile, Alabama, March 8, 1864)

On February 9, 1864, Nathan Bedford Forrest reported to his commanders that Aaron Forrest "is on the Yazoo River with one regiment fighting gunboats and transports."

According to a compensation request filed with the U.S. government, Aaron Forrest and company burned cotton and gin-houses belonging to Greenwood LeFlore on February 15, 1864:

It is further stated in the petition as a basis for a claim against the Government that said Greenwood Leflore had on his plantation on the 15th day of February, 1864, 830 bales of cotton of the then-value of $186,750, a gin-house, and two stands, of the value of $6,000; and that on that day the rebels, under Col. Aaron Forrest, burned up the said cotton, gin-house, and stands; and that this was the only property burned in the neighborhood except the property of his son, J. D. Leflore, and that of his daughter, Rebecca C. Harris; and it is averred that the sole reason why this property was so destroyed was the active Unionism of said Leflore and his family.

In March 1864, troops led by Capt. A. Forrest were involved in defending Greenwood, Mississippi from a U.S. Army incursion now known as the Battle of Yazoo City.

== Death ==
Sources generally agree that Aaron Forrest died in April 1864, but conflict on specific location and cause of death.

- The Official Records of the War of the Rebellion contain a letter dated April 15, 1864 that reported "Colonel Aaron Forrest, brother of the general, died at Jackson on Thursday night last."
- In late April 1864, newspapers of Memphis, Tennessee and Macon, Georgia reported that Aaron Forrest died near and was buried at Aberdeen, Mississippi.
- In May 1864 a long newspaper account written by one "G. W. A." (who was seemingly attached to N. B. Forrest's command) reported "Col. Aaron Forrest died, while at Trenton, of typhoid fever."
- An 1899 biography of Nathan Bedford Forrest written by John Allan Wyeth stated, "Aaron Forrest, the fourth son, became a lieutenant-colonel of a Mississippi regiment of cavalry, and in the expedition to Paducah, Kentucky, in 1864, was taken ill with pneumonia, and died near Dresden, in west Tennessee."
- Hurst's biography published 1993 states that on April 13, 1864, "Forrest was arriving at Jackson to find his brother Aaron, lieutenant colonel of a Mississippi cavalry regiment, dead of pneumonia contracted three weeks earlier during the first Paducah operation."

== See also ==
- History of slavery in Mississippi
- List of American slave traders
- R. H. Elam – 19th-century American slave trader
- Movement to reopen the transatlantic slave trade
- Mississippi in the American Civil War
- List of Mississippi Civil War Confederate units
