= Roundaway, Mississippi =

Roundaway, Mississippi may refer to:

- Roundaway, Coahoma County, Mississippi, an unincorporated community
- Roundaway, Sunflower County, Mississippi, an unincorporated community
