= Lombardy (disambiguation) =

Lombardy refers to the administrative region in northern Italy.

It may also refer to:

- 57th Infantry Division Lombardia, and infantry division of the Royal Italian Army during World War II
- Lombardy (historical region), the historical region encompassing the modern region and some of the neighbouring territories
- Lombardy (wine), the wine region in northern Italy
- Lombardy, Mississippi, a village in the United States
- Lombardy, Ontario, a village in Canada
