= Hugh Pentecost =

Hugh Pentecost may refer to:

- Hugh Pentecost (author), pseudonym of Judson Philips (1903–1989), American writer
- Hugh O. Pentecost (1848–1907), radical American minister, editor, lawyer and lecturer
