= Stephenville =

Stephenville may refer to:

- Stephenville, Newfoundland and Labrador, Canada
- Stephenville, Edison, New Jersey, United States
- Stephenville, Mississippi, United States
- Stephenville, Texas, United States

== See also ==
- Stephenville Crossing
- Stephenville High School
- Stephenville International Airport
