= Holly Ridge =

Holly Ridge may refer to:

- Holly Ridge, Louisiana
- Holly Ridge, Mississippi
- Holly Ridge, North Carolina

== See also ==
- Hollyridge Strings
