= Linn, Mississippi =

- Unincorporated community
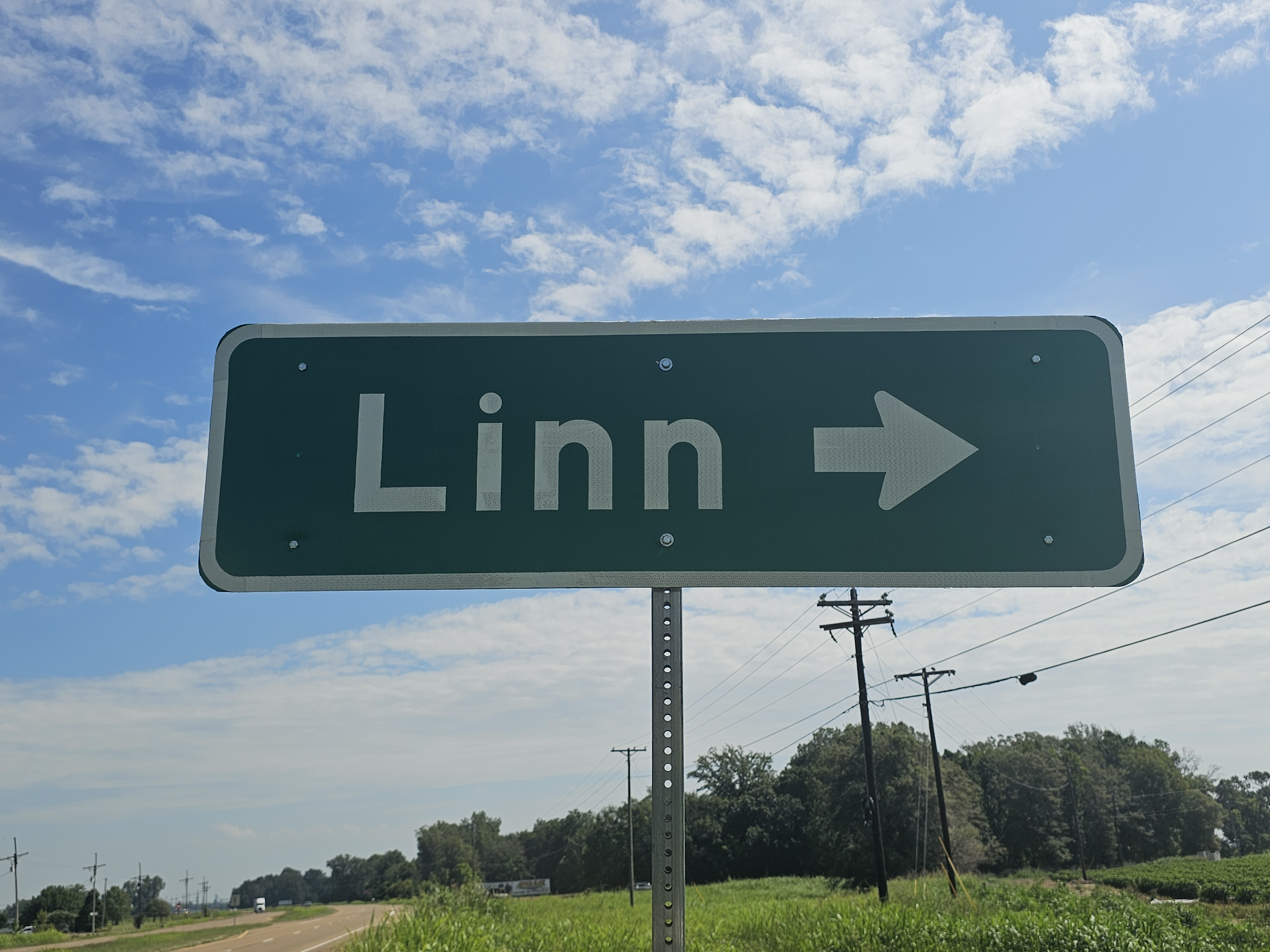
- Highway sign outside of Linn

- Location within Mississippi Location within the United States
- Coordinates: 33°39′35″N 90°36′59″W
- Country: United States
- State: Mississippi
- County: Sunflower
- Elevation: 135 ft (41 m)
- Time zone: UTC-6 (Central (CST))
  - Summer (DST): UTC-5 (CDT)
- ZIP code: 38736
- Area code: 662
- GNIS feature ID: 672515

Linn is an unincorporated community located in Sunflower County, Mississippi. Linn is located on Mississippi Highway 442 and is approximately 6 miles (9.7 km) east of Doddsville and approximately 3 miles (4.8 km) north of Steiner.

A post office operated under the name Linn from 1898 to 1919.

== Gallery ==
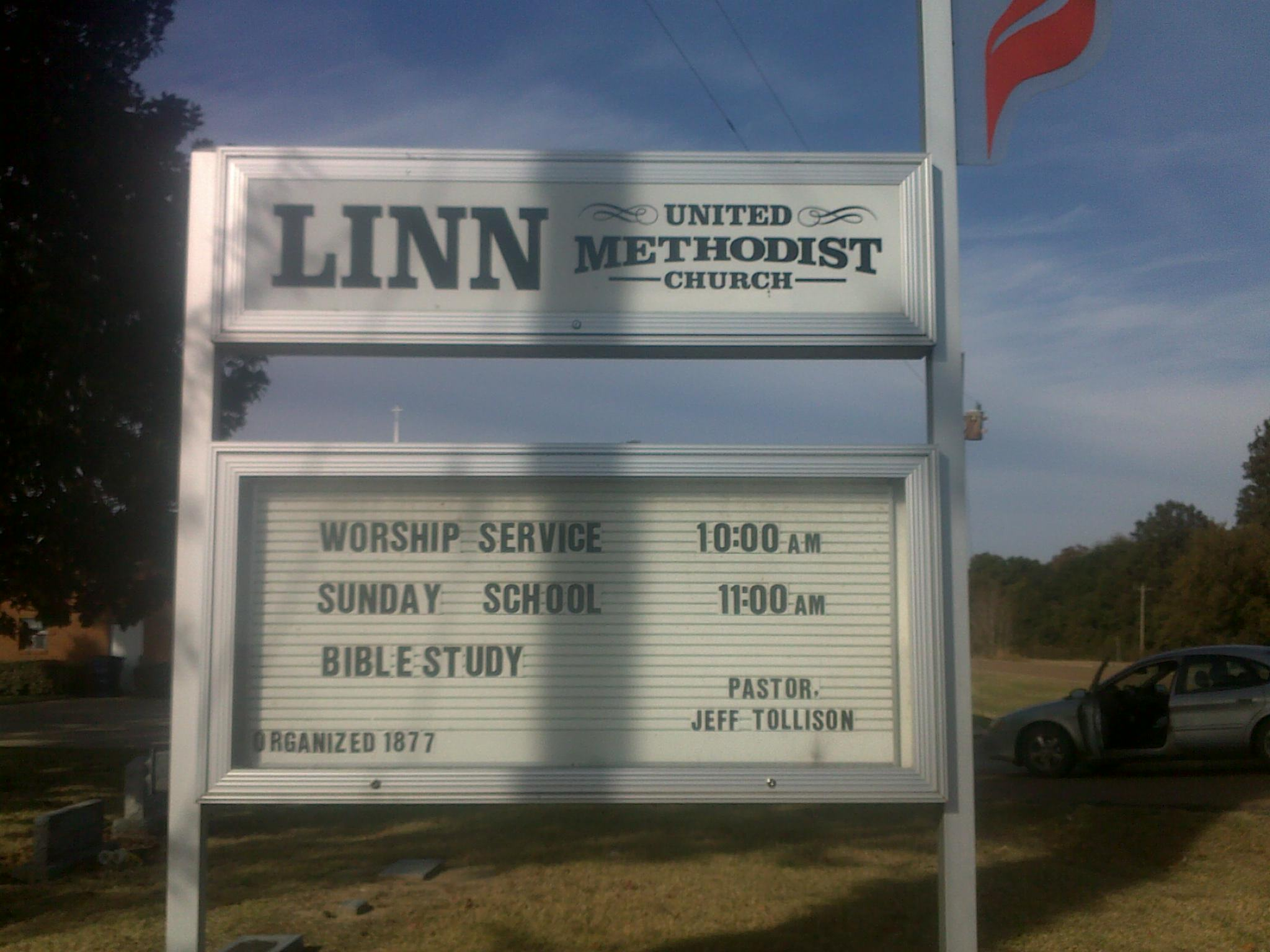
Linn Methodist Church just off Hwy. 442

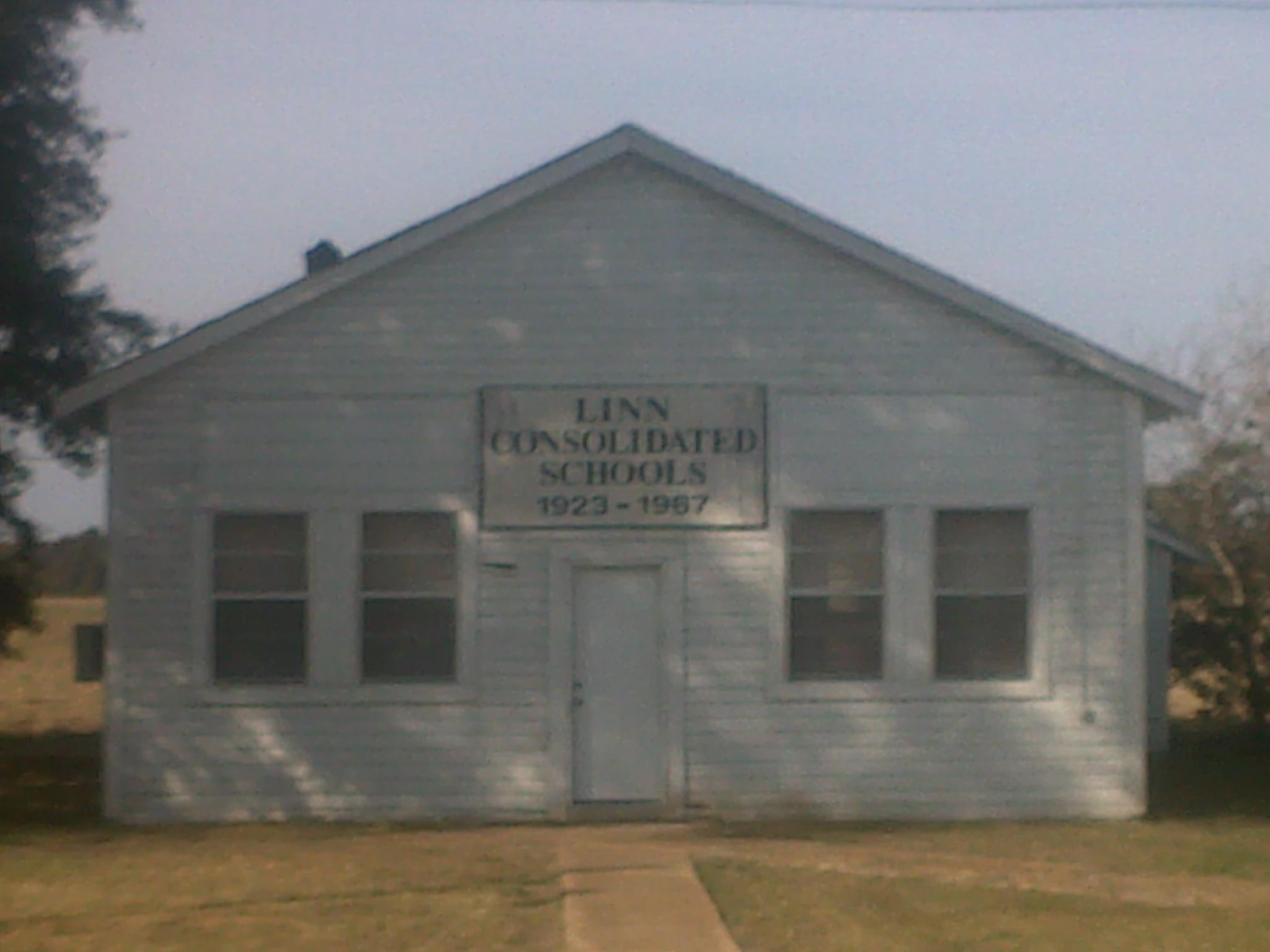
Linn Consolidated Schools building, which operated from 1923-1967
