= Baird, Mississippi =

- Unincorporated community
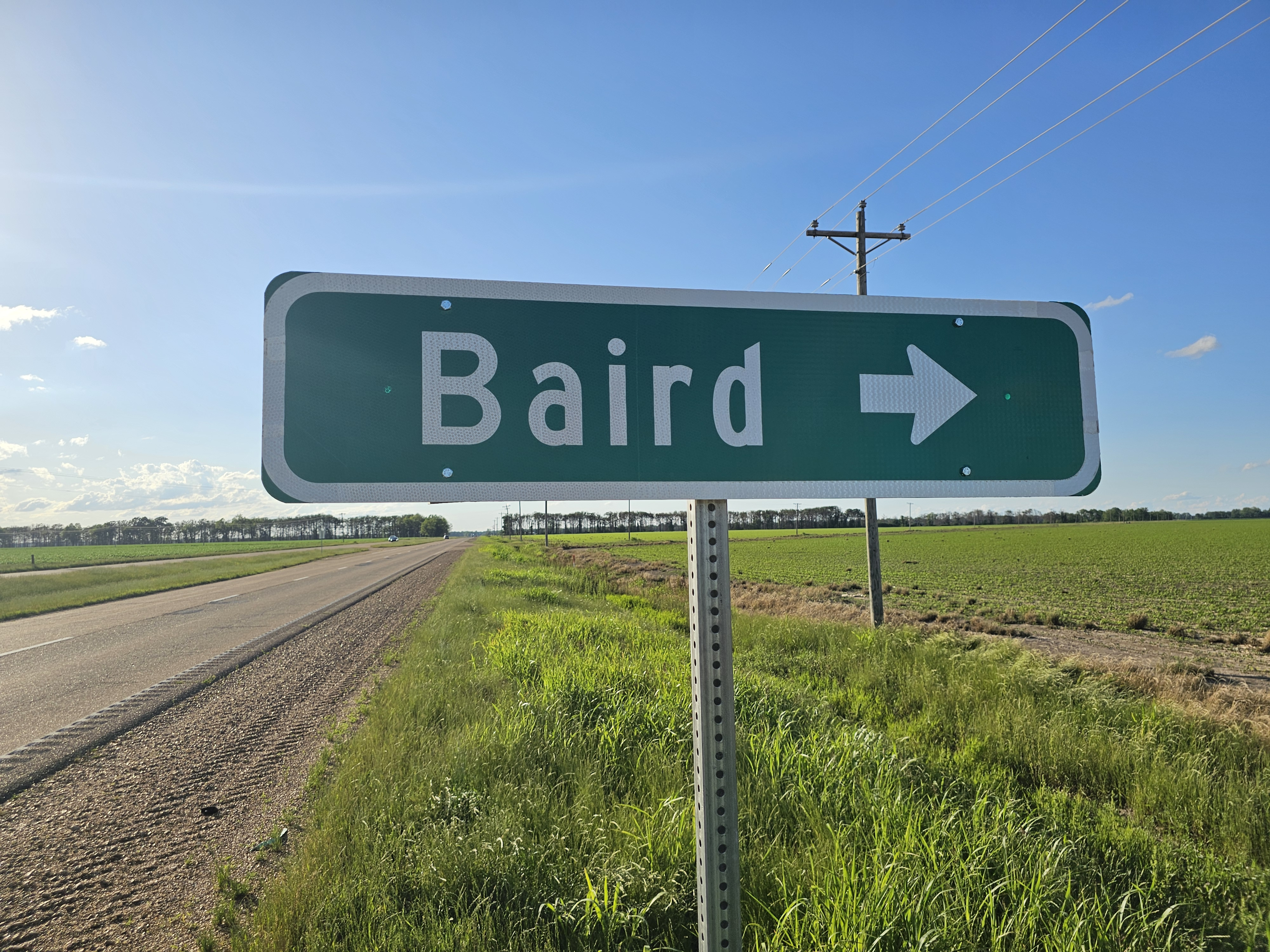
- Highway sign outside of Baird

- Location within Mississippi Location within the United States
- Coordinates: 33°25′30″N 90°30′00″W
- Country: United States
- State: Mississippi
- County: Sunflower
- Elevation: 118 ft (36 m)
- Time zone: UTC-6 (Central (CST))
  - Summer (DST): UTC-5 (CDT)
- ZIP code: 38751
- Area code: 662
- GNIS feature ID: 711032

Baird is an unincorporated community located in Sunflower County, Mississippi, United States.

Baird is approximately 3 miles (4.8 km) west of Moorhead and 10 miles (16 km) southeast of Indianola.

The settlement was named for John Rupert Baird, the former owner of the town site.

In the early 1900s, a station of the Southern Railway was located in Baird. The track, originally crossing the state from Columbus to Greenville, is currently owned and operated by the Columbus and Greenville Railway, and line is now truncated as far as Greenwood.
