= Stephenville, Mississippi =

- Unincorporated community
- Location within Mississippi Location within the United States
- Coordinates: 33°32′53″N 90°40′18″W
- Country: United States
- State: Mississippi
- County: Sunflower
- Elevation: 115 ft (35 m)
- Time zone: UTC-6 (Central (CST))
  - Summer (DST): UTC-5 (CDT)
- ZIP code: 38751
- Area code: 662
- GNIS feature ID: 707776

Stephenville is an unincorporated community located in Sunflower County, Mississippi, United States. Stephenville is approximately 6 miles (9.7 km) north of Indianola and approximately 2 miles (3.2 km) northwest of Boyer along Mississippi Highway 448.

The community is located along Porters Bayou.

A post office operated under the name Stephensville from 1897 to 1914.
