= Wade Walton =

American blues musician (1919–2000)

Wade Walton (October 10, 1919 – January 10, 2000) was an American blues musician and local civil rights leader from Mississippi. He was also a renowned barber, who counted many famous musicians amongst his friends, colleagues, and customers.

== Life and career ==
Walton was born in Lombardy, Mississippi but grew up near Parchman Farm. He attended barber college in Memphis, Tennessee, and subsequently opened a barber shop in Clarksdale, Mississippi.

Walton was known as the "blues barber" because his "Big Six barber shop" was a center of musical activity in Clarksdale. It was located first at 304 Fourth Street, and since 1989 at 317 Issaquena Avenue, which was previously the site of W.C. Handy's house. Walton was proficient on the harmonica, the guitar, and the razor strop, which he played by striking it rhythmically with his razor. Walton was recorded in his barber shop by Paul Oliver in 1960. He later recorded an album, Shake 'Em On Down, released by Bluesville Records in the early 1960s.

In 1960, by chance, Robert Curtis Smith met Paul Oliver and Chris Strachwitz in Walton's barber shop. This led to Smith recording, The Blues of Robert Curtis Smith: Clarksdale Blues (1963).

Walton played in the Kings of Rhythm with Ike Turner, but stayed in Clarksdale working as a barber when Turner took the group national.

Many musicians and other notable people patronized Walton's barber shop to play music with him or in homage, including Howlin' Wolf, Muddy Waters, Sonny Boy Williamson II, and Allen Ginsberg.

Walton was also a local NAACP leader during the civil rights movement in the early 1960s, resulting in the bombing of his barbershop.

He makes appearances in Bill Ferris's 1975 documentary about the Delta blues, Give My Poor Heart Ease and in Robert Mugge's documentary film Deep Blues: A Musical Pilgrimage to the Crossroads.

Walton died in St. Louis, Missouri, on January 10, 2000, at the age of 80.

== Legacy ==
Walton was honored with a marker on the Mississippi Blues Trail.

== Discography ==
- The Blues of Wade Walton (1962)
- Barbershop Rhythm – Arhoolie Records
- Shake 'Em On Down – Bluesville Records
