= Caile, Mississippi =

- Unincorporated community
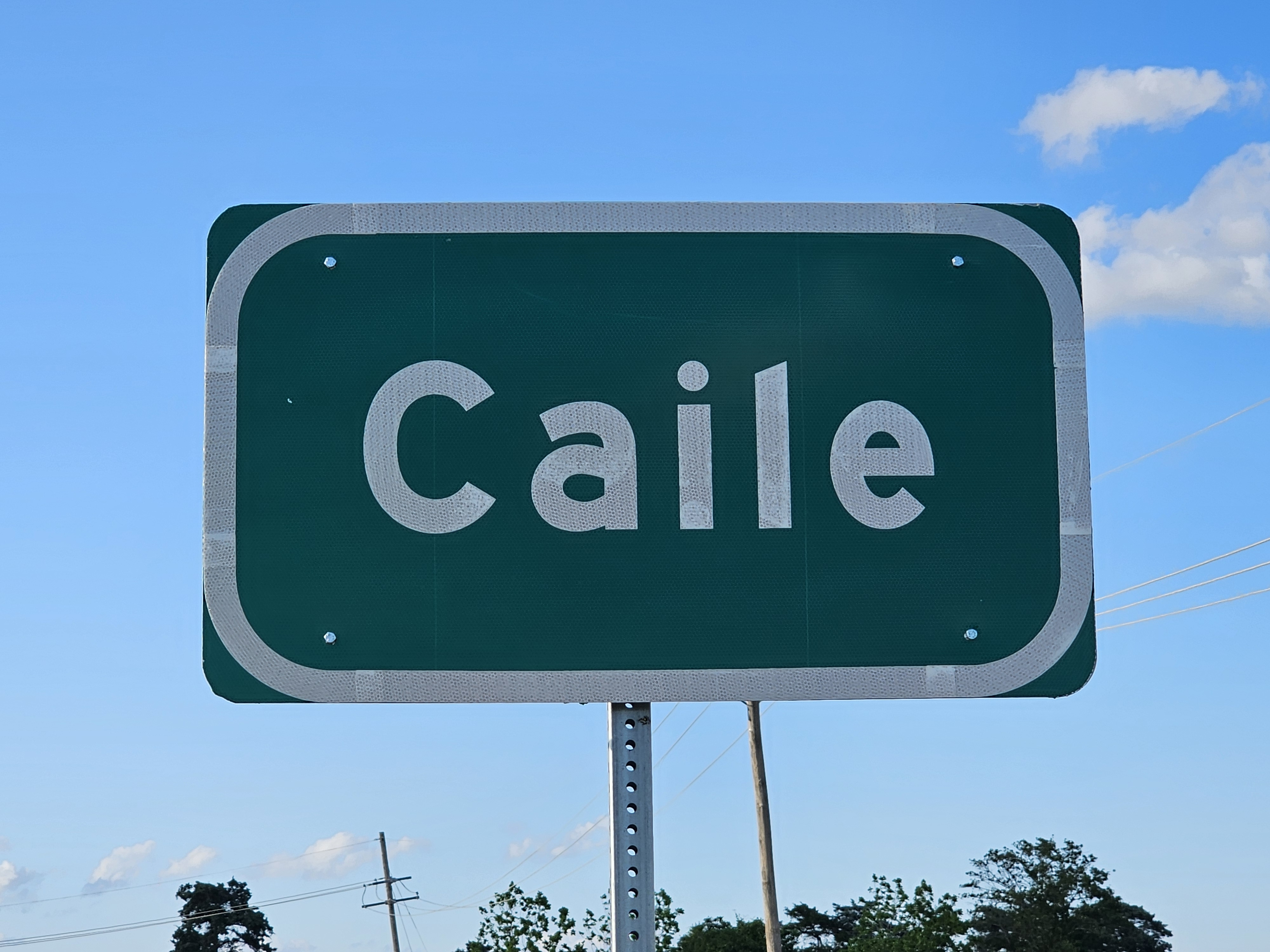
- Highway sign in Caile

- Location within Mississippi Location within the United States
- Coordinates: 33°18′00″N 90°35′24″W
- Country: United States
- State: Mississippi
- County: Sunflower
- Elevation: 115 ft (35 m)
- Time zone: UTC-6 (Central (CST))
  - Summer (DST): UTC-5 (CDT)
- ZIP code: 38753
- Area code: 662
- GNIS feature ID: 667906

Caile is an unincorporated community located in Sunflower County, Mississippi in the Mississippi Delta. Caile is located on U.S. Route 49W approximately 3 miles (4.8 km) north of Isola and approximately 3 miles (4.8 km) south of Inverness.

The origin of the community's name is unknown and was also known as "Lawrence Deadening".

It was founded c. 1888 but never grew to more than a small settlement. The post office, named Ark, was discontinued in 1917 to avoid confusion with Coila in Carroll County. There was a store which was continuously owned and operated by Sid and Helen Windham in downtown from April 1954 to 1997. The store building itself was constructed in 1930 by Herman C. Burrus, and still exists today (June 2006) as the residence of Sid and Helen Windham. Families that settled in Caile were Aycock, Orr, Windham, Jones, Miller, Cook, Wright, Sumrall, Shepard, Maxwell, Bradley, Paxton, Pennebaker, Tinnin, and Gholston, to name a few. In 1903, the Yazoo and Mississippi Valley Railroad, known locally as the Yellow Dog, purchased ROW and built a line through the Caile community. There was a commissary and loading platform on the property of Ellis Orr. This served as a flagstop for the Y&MVRR. A large open sandpit exists today just south of this site where dirt for constructing the roadbed was excavated. The railroad was abandoned in the 1980s.

== Churches ==
The Caile United Methodist Church is east of the sandpit facing Route 49W. Across the highway from the church is the Caile Cemetery, which has been in use since 1894. St Lawrence Missionary Baptist Church, a church of African-American origin, is farther south on the highway. The cemetery for this church is on both sides of Route 49W. Many of the graves in this cemetery were moved west of the highway when right-of-way was acquired for expansion of 49W to four lanes. Property for both of these churches was donated in the 1890s by Ms Emma Reynolds, the postmistress of Ark.

== Historical buildings ==
Very few of the original dwellings remain in Caile. The Windham homestead, built in the 1870s, was originally part of the Jake Orr estate and still stands but is in very poor condition. The original commissary, which faced the railroad, was destroyed by a lightning fire in the 1930s.

== Schools ==
There were two segregated schools in the Caile community. The African-American school was on the property of W. W. Gholston. It had not been in use since the 1950s, and was destroyed by fire in 2006. The "white" school was just south of the Caile store on the property of W. O. Jones. It was consolidated with Inverness in the early 1930s. The site of this school is now a large pit where dirt was excavated for highway construction during four-laning in the 1980s.

== Gallery ==
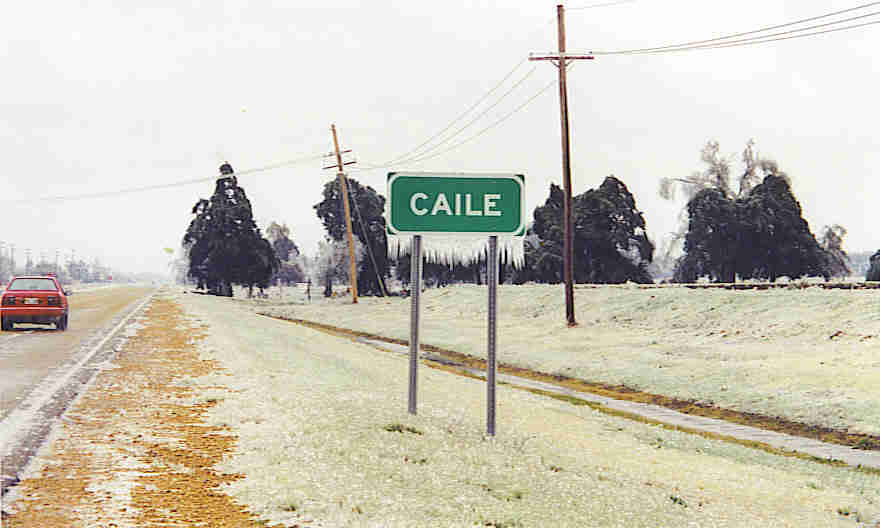
A Cold Day in Caile

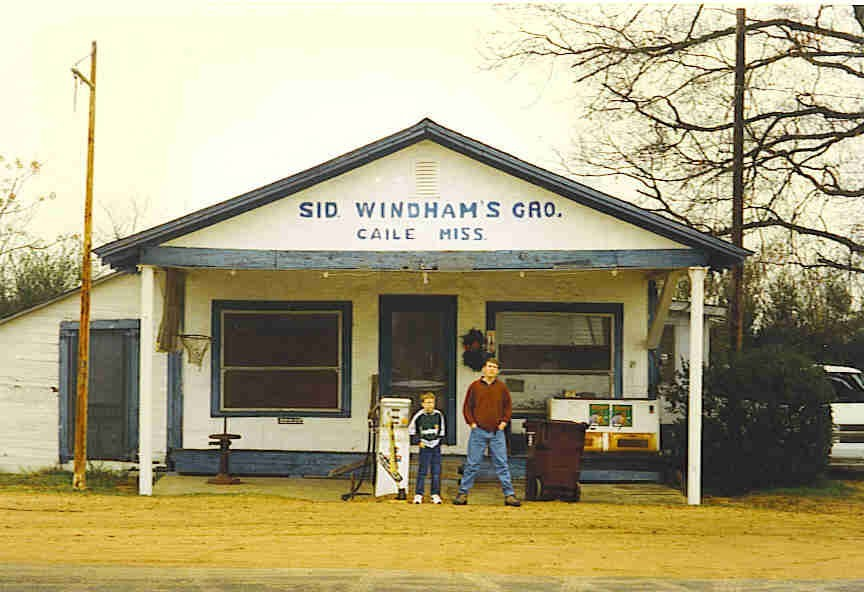
Caile Store, Constructed in 1930

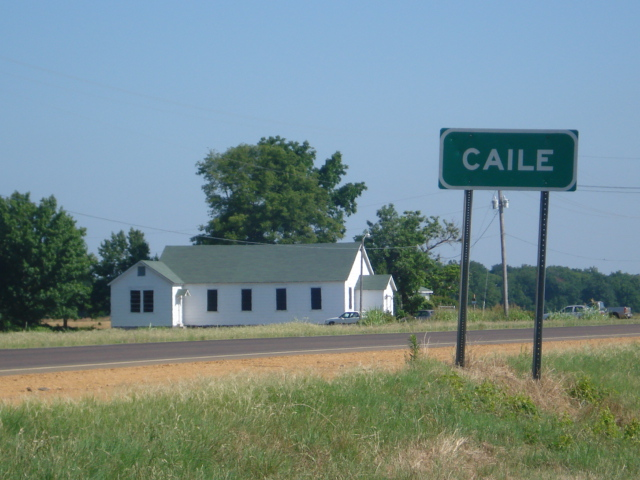
Caile United Methodist Church

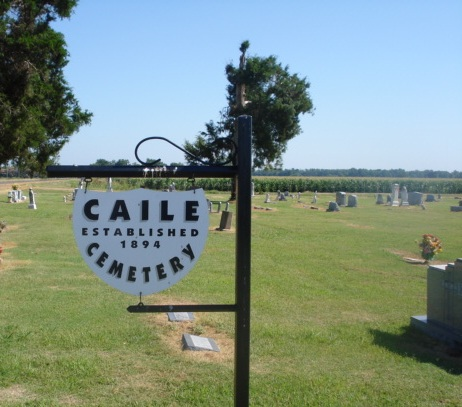
Cemetery at Caile UMC

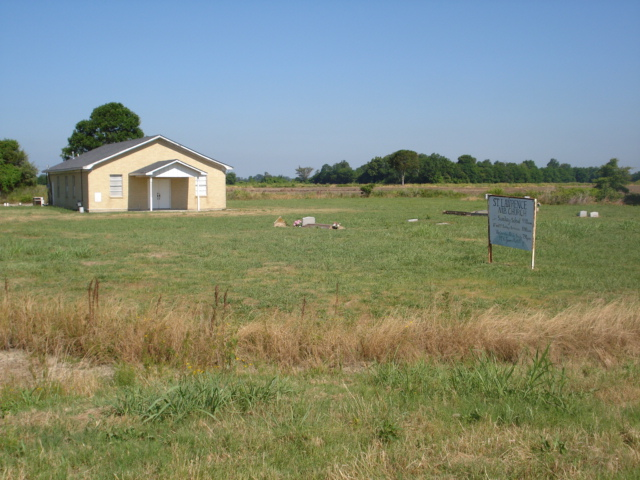
St Lawrence MB Church

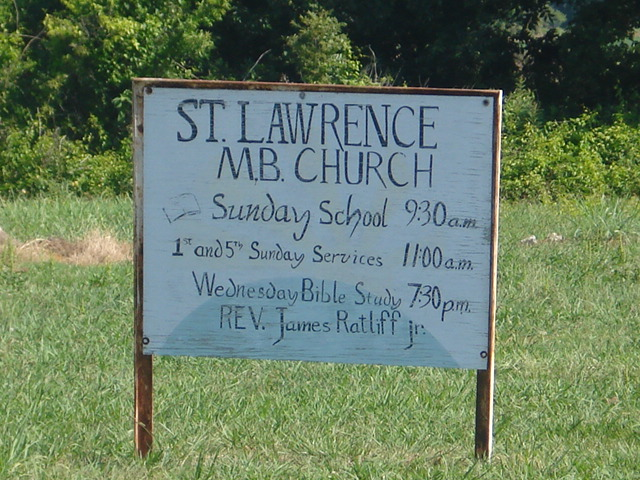
St Lawrence MB Church Sign
