= Steiner, Mississippi =

- Unincorporated community
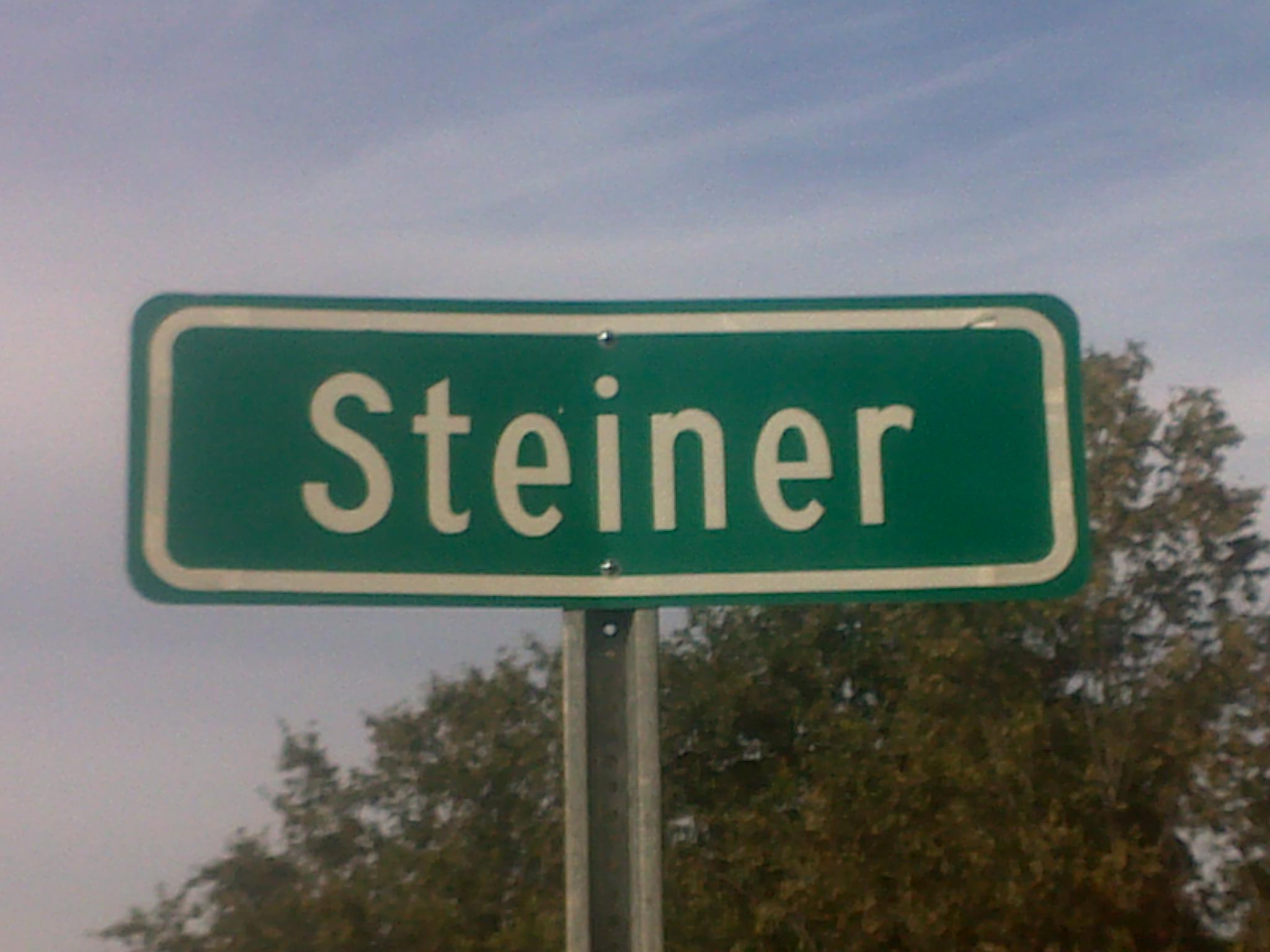
- Highway sign in Steiner

- Location within Mississippi Location within the United States
- Coordinates: 33°36′58″N 90°37′04″W
- Country: United States
- State: Mississippi
- County: Sunflower
- Elevation: 135 ft (41 m)
- Time zone: UTC-6 (Central (CST))
  - Summer (DST): UTC-5 (CDT)
- ZIP code: 38773
- Area code: 662
- GNIS feature ID: 678267

Steiner is an unincorporated community located in Sunflower County, Mississippi. Steiner is located on Mississippi Highway 442 and is approximately 2.5 miles (4.0 km) north of Roundaway and approximately 3 miles (4.8 km) south of Linn.

In 1900, Steiner had a population of 21.

A post office operated under the name Steiner from 1894 to 1912.

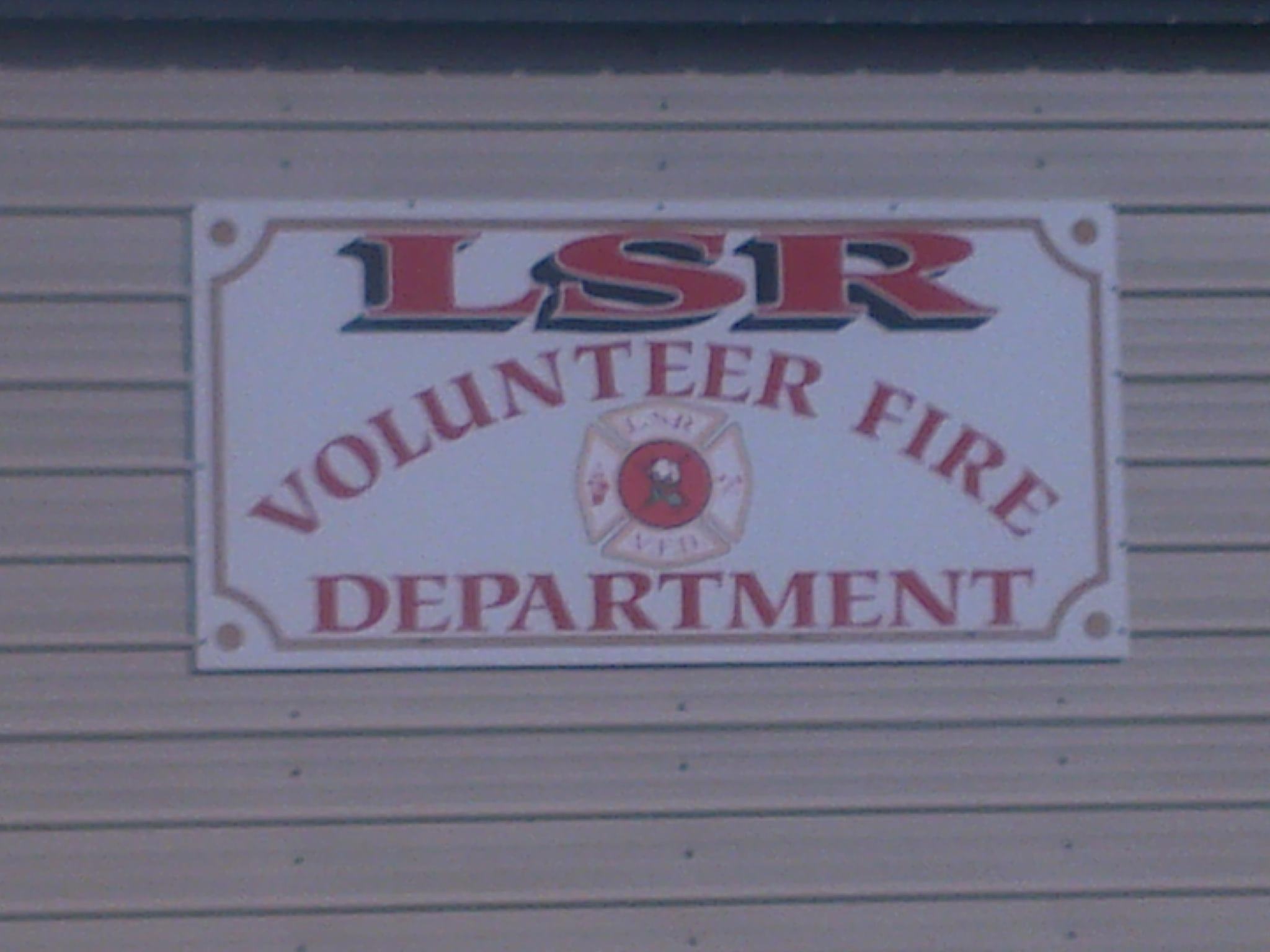
LSR (Linn-Steiner-Roundaway) Volunteer Fire Department in Steiner

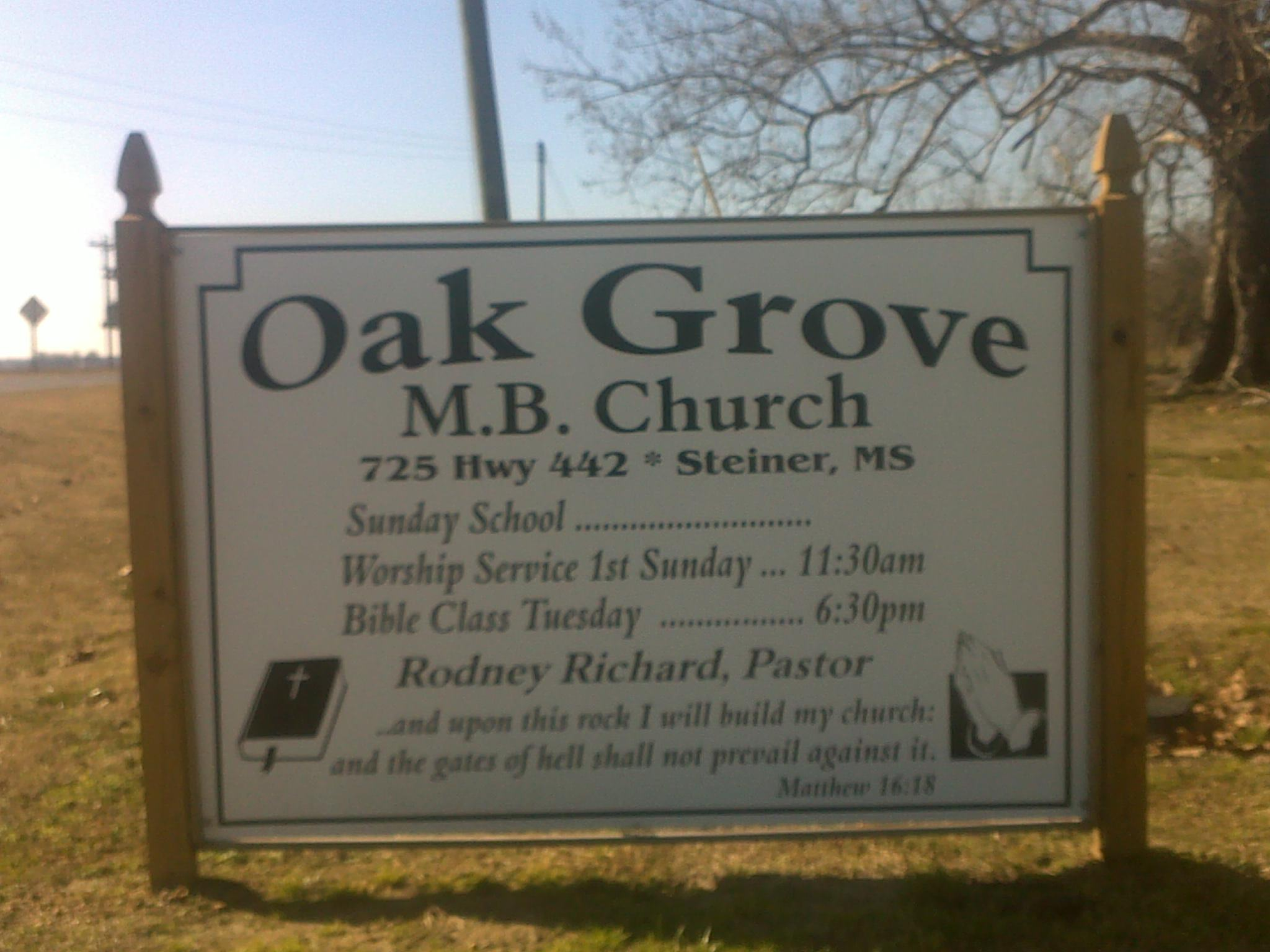
Oak Grove M.B. Church along Hwy. 442 in the Steiner area
