= Minot, Mississippi =

- Unincorporated community
- Location within Mississippi Location within the United States
- Coordinates: 33°56′31″N 90°29′23″W
- Country: United States
- State: Mississippi
- County: Sunflower
- Elevation: 144 ft (44 m)
- Time zone: UTC-6 (Central (CST))
  - Summer (DST): UTC-5 (CDT)
- ZIP code: 38768
- Area code: 662
- GNIS feature ID: 673681

Minot is an unincorporated community located in northern Sunflower County, Mississippi. Minot is approximately 2 miles (3.2 km) north of Parchman and approximately 1.4 miles (2.3 km) south of Rome along U.S. Route 49W.

Minot is located on the former Yazoo and Mississippi Valley Railroad.

In 1939, Minot had a population of 75.

A post office operated under the name Minot from 1900 to 1911.
