= Lombardy, Mississippi =

- Unincorporated community
- Location within Mississippi Location within the United States
- Coordinates: 33°54′20″N 90°36′25″W
- Country: United States
- State: Mississippi
- County: Sunflower
- Elevation: 118 ft (36 m)
- Time zone: UTC-6 (Central (CST))
  - Summer (DST): UTC-5 (CDT)
- ZIP code: 38737
- Area code: 662
- GNIS feature ID: 672778

Lombardy is an unincorporated community located in northern Sunflower County, Mississippi. Lombardy is approximately 5.3 miles (8.5 km) south of Baltzer and approximately 7 miles (11 km) east of Mound Bayou at the junction of Lombardy and Mound Bayou Roads.

Lombardy is located along the former Yazoo and Mississippi Valley Railroad and in 1939 had a population of 50.

A post office operated under the name Lombardy from 1909 to 1941.

== Notable people ==
- Sonny Boy Nelson, Delta blues musician
- Wade Walton, blues musician, was born in Lombardy.
