= Promised Land, Mississippi =

- Ghost town
- Location within the state of Mississippi
- Coordinates: 33°50′40″N 90°31′30″W
- Country: United States
- State: Mississippi
- County: Sunflower
- Elevation: 135 ft (41 m)
- Time zone: UTC-6 (Central (CST))
  - Summer (DST): UTC-5 (CDT)
- GNIS feature ID: 707763

Promised Land is a ghost town in Sunflower County, Mississippi, United States.

The settlement had a post office, and was located on the Promised Land Plantation, approximately 2.5 mi (4.0 km) north of present-day Drew, Mississippi.
