= George Frederick Pentecost =

American clergyman

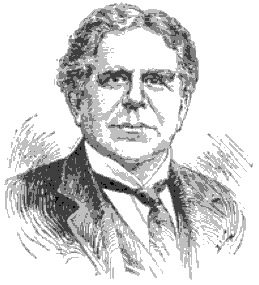
- Born: September 23, 1842; Albion, Illinois
- Died: August 7, 1920 (aged 77); New York
- Occupation: Clergyman
- Relatives: Hugh O. Pentecost (brother)

George Frederick Pentecost (1842–1920) was a prominent American evangelist and co-worker with Revivalist D.L. Moody.

== Biography ==
He was born September 23, 1842, in Albion, Illinois, to Hugh Lockett and Emma Flower Pentecost, who was the daughter of Albion's founder George Flower (1788–1862). George's brother, Hugh O. Pentecost, was also a minister and activist.

Pentecost responded to Hindu criticism of slums, saying "Some of the brahmans of India have dared to make an attack upon Christianity. They take the slums of New York and Chicago and ask us why we do not cure ourselves. They take what is outside the pale of Christianity and judge Christianity by it."

Pentecost spoke against the behavior of westerners in Asian countries.

When after his return from a long journey in Asia, the Rev. Dr. George Pentecost was asked— "What are the darkest spots in the missionary outlook?" he replied:— "In lands of spiritual darkness, it is difficult to speak of darkest spots." I should say, however, that if there is a darkness more dark than other darkness, it is that which is cast into heathen darkness by the ungodliness of the American and European communities that have invaded the East for the sake of trade and empire. The corruption of Western godliness is the worst evil in the East. Of course there are noble exceptions among western commercial men and their families, but as a rule the European and American resident in the East is a constant contradiction to all and everything which the missionary stands for.

Pentecost spoke out against western imperialism in Asian countries and asserted that the actions of western nations did not come from Christianity.

He died August 7, 1920, in New York while travelling to preach. He had pastored Congregational, Baptist and Presbyterian Churches, latterly Bethany Presbyterian Church, Philadelphia.

== See also ==
- Religious views on smoking § Christianity
