= Baltzer, Mississippi =

- Unincorporated community
- Location within Mississippi Location within the United States
- Coordinates: 33°58′55″N 90°35′41″W
- Country: United States
- State: Mississippi
- County: Sunflower
- Elevation: 118 ft (36 m)
- Time zone: UTC-6 (Central (CST))
  - Summer (DST): UTC-5 (CDT)
- ZIP code: 38768
- Area code: 662
- GNIS feature ID: 666498

Baltzer is an unincorporated community located in northern Sunflower County, Mississippi. Baltzer is approximately 2 miles (3.2 km) south of Roundaway and 16 miles (26 km) south of Clarksdale at the intersection of Lombardy and New Africa Road near the Sunflower County/Coahoma County border.

== Notable people ==
- Eugene Moore - Member of Illinois House of Representatives; Recorder of Deeds for Cook County, Illinois.
