= Pentecost, Mississippi =

Pentecost
- Populated place
- Location within Mississippi
- Coordinates: 33°35′05″N 90°31′43″W
- Country: United States
- State: Mississippi
- County: Sunflower
- Elevation: 121 ft (37 m)
- Time zone: UTC-6 (Central (CST))
  - Summer (DST): UTC-5 (CDT)
- ZIP code: 38778
- Area code: 662
- GNIS feature ID: 692135

Pentecost is a populated place located in Sunflower County, Mississippi, on US Route 49.

Pentecost is located on the former Illinois Central Gulf Railroad.

In 1900, Pentecost had a population of 23.

A post office operated under the name Pentecost from 1894 to 1908.
