= Roundaway, Sunflower County, Mississippi =

Roundaway, Mississippi
- Unincorporated community
- Location within Mississippi Location within the United States
- Coordinates: 33°35′05″N 90°36′22″W
- Country: United States
- State: Mississippi
- County: Sunflower
- Elevation: 121 ft (37 m)
- Time zone: UTC-6 (Central (CST))
  - Summer (DST): UTC-5 (CDT)
- ZIP code: 38751
- Area code: 662
- GNIS feature ID: 707767

Roundaway is an unincorporated community located in Sunflower County, Mississippi. Steiner is located on Steiner-Boyer Road and is approximately 2.5 miles (4.0 km) south of Steiner and approximately 4 miles (6.4 km) north of Boyer.

Roundaway is located on the former Yazoo and Mississippi Valley Railroad and in 1939 had a population of 600.

The community was formerly served by a school.
