= Roundaway, Coahoma County, Mississippi =

Roundaway, Mississippi
- Unincorporated community
- Location within Mississippi Location within the United States
- Coordinates: 34°00′51″N 90°35′53″W
- Country: United States
- State: Mississippi
- County: Coahoma
- Elevation: 151 ft (46 m)
- Time zone: UTC-6 (Central (CST))
  - Summer (DST): UTC-5 (CDT)
- ZIP code: 38614
- Area code: 662
- GNIS feature ID

Roundaway is an unincorporated community located in Coahoma County, Mississippi, United States. Roundaway is approximately 14 miles (23 km) south of Clarksdale and 2 miles (3.2 km) north of Baltzer on New Africa Road. Roundaway is located on the former Yazoo and Mississippi Valley Railroad. A public school was once operated in Roundaway. A post office operated under the name Roundaway from 1905 to 1935.
