= Sunflower County, Mississippi =

County in Mississippi, United States

- County
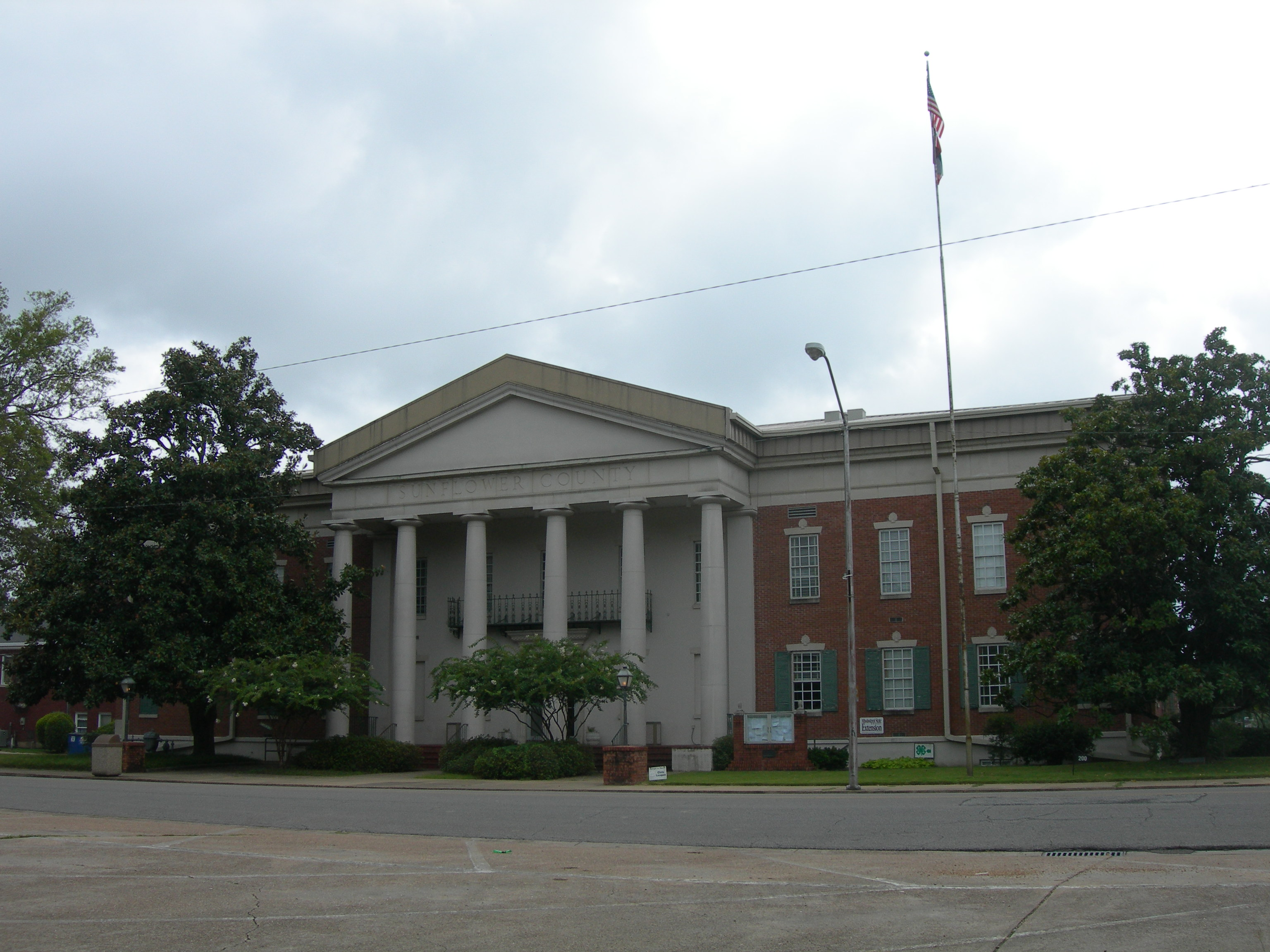
- The Sunflower County Courthouse in Indianola

- Location within the U.S. state of Mississippi
- Coordinates: 33.605529°N 90.59509°W
- Country: United States
- State: Mississippi
- Founded: February 15, 1844
- Named for: Sunflower River
- Seat: Indianola
- Largest city: Indianola

Area
  - Total: 706.928 sq mi (1,830.94 km^{2})
  - Land: 697.759 sq mi (1,807.19 km^{2})
  - Water: 9.169 sq mi (23.75 km^{2}) 1.30%

Population (2020)
  - Total: 25,971
  - Estimate (2025): 22,893 ▼
  - Density: 32.996/sq mi (12.740/km^{2})
- Time zone: UTC−6 (Central)
  - Summer (DST): UTC−5 (CDT)
- Area code: 662
- Congressional district: 2nd
- Website: sunflowercounty.ms.gov

Sunflower County is a county located in the U.S. state of Mississippi. As of the 2020 census, the population was 25,971, and was estimated to be 22,893 in 2025. The county seat and the largest city is Indianola.

Sunflower County comprises the Indianola, MS Micropolitan statistical area, which is included in the Cleveland-Indianola, MS Combined statistical area. It is located in the Mississippi Delta region.

Mississippi State Penitentiary (Parchman Farm) is located in Sunflower County.

== History ==
The land that became Sunflower County was ceded by the Choctaw under the 1831 Treaty of Dancing Rabbit Creek. Sunflower County was created on February 15, 1844. The land mass encompassed most of Sunflower and Leflore Counties as we know them today. The first seat of government was Clayton, located near Fort Pemberton. Later the county seat was moved to McNutt, also in present-day Leflore County. When Sunflower and Leflore counties were separated in 1871, the new county seat for Sunflower County was moved to Johnsonville. This village was located where the north end of Mound Bayou empties into the Sunflower River. In 1882 the county seat was moved to Eureka, which was later renamed Indianola. Boyer Cemetery, located in Boyer, goes back to the early days of Sunflower County.

In 1870, 3,243 black people lived in Sunflower County. This increased to 12,070 in 1900, making up 75% of the residents in Sunflower County. Between 1900 and 1920, the black population almost tripled.

== Geography ==
According to the United States Census Bureau, the county has a total area of 706.928 square miles (1,830.94 km^{2}), of which 697.759 square miles (1,807.19 km^{2}) is land and 9.169 square miles (23.75 km^{2}) (1.30%) is water. It is the 19th largest county in Mississippi by total area.

Sunflower County is the longest county in Mississippi. The traveling distance from the southern boundary at Caile to its northern boundary at Rome is approximately 71 miles.

The center of the county is about 30 miles (48 km) east of the Mississippi River, about 40 miles (64 km) west of the hill section of Mississippi, 100 miles (160 km) north of Jackson, and about 100 miles (160 km) south of Memphis, Tennessee.

=== Adjacent counties ===
- Coahoma County (north)
- Tallahatchie County (northeast)
- Leflore County (east)
- Humphreys County (south)
- Washington County (southwest)
- Bolivar County (northwest)

== Demographics ==
Historical population
Census	Pop.	Note	%±
1850	1,102		—
1860	5,019		355.4%
1870	5,015		−0.1%
1880	4,661		−7.1%
1890	9,384		101.3%
1900	16,084		71.4%
1910	28,787		79.0%
1920	46,374		61.1%
1930	66,364		43.1%
1940	61,007		−8.1%
1950	56,031		−8.2%
1960	45,750		−18.3%
1970	37,047		−19.0%
1980	34,844		−5.9%
1990	32,867		−5.7%
2000	34,369		4.6%
2010	29,450		−14.3%
2020	25,971		−11.8%
2025 (est.)	22,893	▼	−11.9%
U.S. Decennial Census; 1790–1960 1900–1990; 1990–2000 2010–2020

The county reached its peak population in 1930. After that, population declined from 1940 to 1990. There was considerable migration out of the rural county, especially as mechanization reduced the need for farm labor. Both whites and blacks left the county. Many African Americans migrated north or west to industrial cities to escape the social oppression and violence of Jim Crow, especially moving in the Great Migration during and after World War II, when the defense industry on the West Coast attracted many.

Sunflower County has the tenth-lowest per capita income in Mississippi and the 72nd-lowest in the United States in 2023. $39,498 in Sunflower County in 2023. $52,017 in Mississippi in 2024. $72,425 in the United States in 2024.

As of the fourth quarter of 2024, the median home value in Sunflower County was $110,130.

As of the 2023 American Community Survey, there are 8,058 estimated households in Sunflower County with an average of 2.70 persons per household. The county has a median household income of $40,265. Approximately 32.5% of the county's population lives at or below the poverty line. Sunflower County has an estimated 48.3% employment rate, with 16.9% of the population holding a bachelor's degree or higher and 75.8% holding a high school diploma.

The top five reported ancestries (people were allowed to report up to two ancestries, thus the figures will generally add to more than 100%) were English (97.9%), Spanish (2.0%), Indo-European (0.1%), Asian and Pacific Islander (0.0%), and Other (0.0%).

=== Racial and ethnic composition ===
Sunflower County, Mississippi – racial and ethnic composition
Note: the US Census treats Hispanic/Latino as an ethnic category. This table excludes Latinos from the racial categories and assigns them to a separate category. Hispanics/Latinos may be of any race.

Race / ethnicity (NH = non-Hispanic)	Pop. 1980	Pop. 1990	Pop. 2000	Pop. 2010	Pop. 2020
White alone (NH)	12,964 (37.21%)	11,556 (35.16%)	9,799 (28.51%)	7,410 (25.16%)	6,729 (25.91%)
Black or African American alone (NH)	21,236 (60.95%)	21,001 (63.90%)	23,871 (69.46%)	21,362 (72.54%)	18,077 (69.60%)
Native American or Alaska Native alone (NH)	30 (0.09%)	28 (0.09%)	29 (0.08%)	47 (0.16%)	19 (0.07%)
Asian alone (NH)	119 (0.34%)	90 (0.27%)	136 (0.40%)	82 (0.28%)	84 (0.32%)
Pacific Islander alone (NH)	—	—	0 (0.00%)	10 (0.03%)	0 (0.00%)
Other race alone (NH)	0 (0.00%)	8 (0.02%)	9 (0.03%)	8 (0.03%)	37 (0.14%)
Mixed race or multiracial (NH)	—	—	77 (0.22%)	127 (0.43%)	364 (1.40%)
Hispanic or Latino (any race)	495 (1.42%)	184 (0.56%)	448 (1.30%)	404 (1.37%)	661 (2.55%)
Total	34,844 (100.00%)	32,867 (100.00%)	34,369 (100.00%)	29,450 (100.00%)	25,971 (100.00%)

=== 2024 estimate ===
As of the 2024 estimate, there were 23,029 people and 8,058 households residing in the county. The population density was 33.00 inhabitants per square mile (12.7/km^{2}). There were 9,438 housing units at an average density of 13.53 per square mile (5.2/km^{2}). The racial makeup of the county was 24.7% White (22.5% NH White), 73.6% African American, 0.4% Native American, 0.5% Asian, 0.0% Pacific Islander, _% from some other races and 0.8% from two or more races. Hispanic or Latino people of any race were 3.3% of the population.

=== 2020 census ===
As of the 2020 census, the county had a population of 25,971, with 8,474 households and 5,729 families residing in the county.

The population density was 37.22 inhabitants per square mile (14.4/km^{2}). There were 9,412 housing units at an average density of 13.49 per square mile (5.2/km^{2}); 10.0% of housing units were vacant. Among occupied housing units, 58.1% were owner-occupied and 41.9% were renter-occupied. The homeowner vacancy rate was 1.6% and the rental vacancy rate was 7.8%.

The racial makeup of the county was 26.5% White, 69.9% Black or African American, 0.1% American Indian and Alaska Native, 0.3% Asian, less than 0.1% Native Hawaiian and Pacific Islander, 1.4% from some other race, and 1.7% from two or more races. Hispanic or Latino residents of any race comprised 2.5% of the population.

The median age was 39.4 years. 21.2% of residents were under the age of 18 and 15.4% were 65 years of age or older. For every 100 females there were 109.5 males, and for every 100 females age 18 and over there were 112.6 males age 18 and over.

36.0% of residents lived in urban areas, while 64.0% lived in rural areas.

There were 8,474 households in the county, of which 34.5% had children under the age of 18 living in them. Of all households, 30.8% were married-couple households, 18.6% were households with a male householder and no spouse or partner present, and 44.1% were households with a female householder and no spouse or partner present. About 28.7% of all households were made up of individuals and 11.8% had someone living alone who was 65 years of age or older.

=== 2010 census ===
As of the 2010 census, there were 29,450 people, 8,822 households, and _ families residing in the county. The population density was 42.21 inhabitants per square mile (16.3/km^{2}). There were 9,685 housing units at an average density of 13.88 per square mile (5.4/km^{2}). The racial makeup of the county was 25.44% White, 72.93% African American, 0.19% Native American, 0.29% Asian, 0.03% Pacific Islander, 0.65% from some other races and 0.47% from two or more races. Hispanic or Latino people of any race were 1.37% of the population.

=== 2000 census ===
As of the 2000 census, there were 34,369 people, 9,637 households, and 7,314 families residing in the county. The population density was 50.0 inhabitants per square mile (19.3/km^{2}). There were 10,338 housing units at an average density of 15.0 per square mile (5.8/km^{2}). The racial makeup of the county was 28.88% White, 69.86% African American, 0.09% Native American, 0.40% Asian, 0.00% Pacific Islander, 0.48% from some other races and 0.28% from two or more races. Hispanic or Latino people of any race were 1.30% of the population.

There were 9,637 households out of which 38.40% had children under the age of 18 living with them, 42.30% were married couples living together, 28.40% had a female householder with no husband present, and 24.10% were non-families. 21.20% of all households were made up of individuals and 9.70% had someone living alone who was 65 years of age or older. The average household size was 3.01 and the average family size was 3.50.

In the county the population was spread out with 27.90% under the age of 18, 14.00% from 18 to 24, 30.30% from 25 to 44, 18.10% from 45 to 64, and 9.70% who were 65 years of age or older. The median age was 30 years. For every 100 females there were 115.90 males. For every 100 females age 18 and over, there were 120.00 males.

The median income for a household in the county was $24,970, and the median income for a family was $29,144. Males had a median income of $26,208 versus $19,145 for females. The per capita income for the county was $11,365. About 24.60% of families and 30.00% of the population were below the poverty line, including 39.50% of those under age 18 and 24.10% of those age 65 or over.

=== 1990 census ===
As of the 1990 census, there were 32,341 people. The racial makeup of the county was 26.40% White, 71.89% African American, 0.12% Native American, 0.60% Asian, 0.00% Pacific Islander, 0.50% from some other races and 0.28% from two or more races. Hispanic or Latino people of any race were 0.56% of the population.

=== 1980 census ===
As of the 1980 census, there were 30,402 people. The racial makeup of the county was 24.45% White, 73.88% African American, 0.15% Native American, 0.80% Asian, 0.00% Pacific Islander, 0.52% from some other races and 0.28% from two or more races. Hispanic or Latino people of any race were 1.42% of the population.

== Government ==
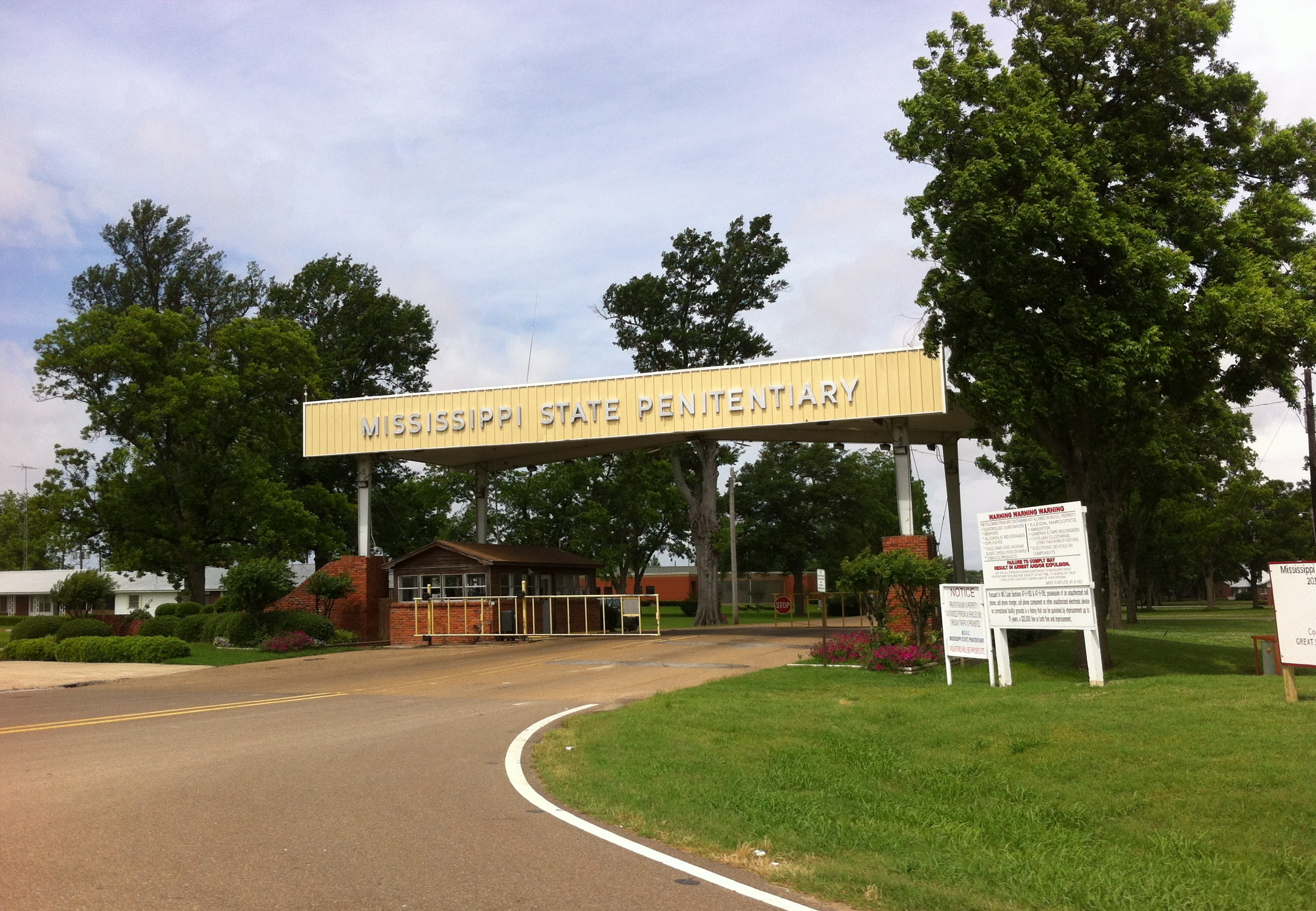
Mississippi State Penitentiary

The Mississippi Department of Corrections (MDOC) is responsible for the state's correctional services, probation services, and parole services. MDOC operates the Mississippi State Penitentiary (MSP; colloquially known as 'Parchman Farm') in the unincorporated community of Parchman in Sunflower County and a probation and parole office in the Courthouse Annex in Indianola.

MSP, a prison for men, is the location of the State of Mississippi male death row and the State of Mississippi execution chamber. Around the time of MSP's opening in 1901, Sunflower County residents objected to having executions performed at MSP because they feared that Sunflower County would be stigmatized as a "death county". Therefore, the State of Mississippi originally performed executions of condemned criminals in their counties of conviction. By the 1950s residents of Sunflower County were still opposed to the concept of housing the execution chamber at MSP. In September 1954, Governor Hugh White called for a special session of the Mississippi Legislature to discuss the application of the death penalty. During that year, an execution chamber was installed at MSP.

Sunflower County mirrors other Mississippi Delta counties in that it is a traditional Democratic stronghold. It has not supported a Republican presidential candidate since 1984.

United States presidential election results for Sunflower County, Mississippi
Year	Republican		Democratic		Third party(ies)	
Year	No.	%	No.	%	No.	%
1912	9	1.80%	462	92.40%	29	5.80%
1916	20	2.22%	879	97.56%	2	0.22%
1920	47	4.21%	1,060	94.98%	9	0.81%
1924	76	4.29%	1,694	95.71%	0	0.00%
1928	88	3.18%	2,676	96.82%	0	0.00%
1932	34	1.39%	2,411	98.41%	5	0.20%
1936	21	0.83%	2,508	99.17%	0	0.00%
1940	71	2.26%	3,071	97.74%	0	0.00%
1944	155	5.25%	2,799	94.75%	0	0.00%
1948	55	2.06%	136	5.09%	2,482	92.85%
1952	2,007	49.48%	2,049	50.52%	0	0.00%
1956	520	16.67%	1,585	50.80%	1,015	32.53%
1960	1,177	34.11%	1,033	29.93%	1,241	35.96%
1964	4,127	94.27%	251	5.73%	0	0.00%
1968	1,036	13.69%	2,602	34.37%	3,932	51.94%
1972	5,389	73.27%	1,874	25.48%	92	1.25%
1976	3,456	43.07%	4,322	53.86%	246	3.07%
1980	3,728	41.76%	5,035	56.40%	164	1.84%
1984	5,178	51.21%	4,913	48.59%	20	0.20%
1988	4,362	46.96%	4,898	52.73%	29	0.31%
1992	3,726	39.68%	5,050	53.77%	615	6.55%
1996	2,926	35.57%	4,960	60.30%	339	4.12%
2000	3,369	40.04%	4,981	59.19%	65	0.77%
2004	3,534	35.29%	6,359	63.49%	122	1.22%
2008	3,245	28.99%	7,838	70.03%	110	0.98%
2012	2,929	26.09%	8,199	73.02%	100	0.89%
2016	2,794	29.11%	6,725	70.07%	79	0.82%
2020	2,799	28.91%	6,781	70.04%	101	1.04%
2024	2,515	31.93%	5,312	67.45%	49	0.62%

== Economy ==
In December 2011, Sunflower County's unemployment rate was 16.2%. The Mississippi statewide rate was 9.9%, and the U.S. overall unemployment rate was 8.3%. As of 2012 it was one of the poorest counties in the United States.

== Transportation ==
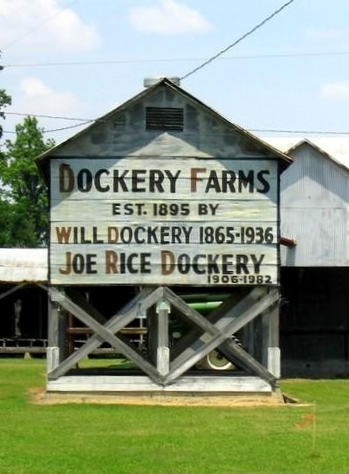
Dockery Plantation

=== Major highways ===
- U.S. Highway 49W
- U.S. Highway 82
- Mississippi Highway 3
- Mississippi Highway 8
- Mississippi Highway 32

=== Airports ===
Two airports are located in unincorporated Sunflower County. Indianola Municipal Airport, near Indianola, is operated by the city. Ruleville-Drew Airport, between Drew and Ruleville, is jointly operated by the two cities.

== Education ==
=== Colleges and universities ===
Mississippi Delta Community College has a main campus in Moorhead and other locations.

=== Primary and secondary schools ===
==== Public schools ====
- Public School Districts
  - Sunflower County Consolidated School District - The district is the only school district in Sunflower County.
  - Former districts: Drew School District, Indianola School District, Sunflower County School District

Between 2010 and 2012, the State of Mississippi had taken over all three Sunflower County school districts and put them under the conservatorship of the Mississippi Department of Education, due to academic and financial reasons. In February 2012, the Mississippi Senate voted 43–4 to pass Senate Bill 2330, to consolidate the three school districts into one school district. The bill went to the Mississippi House of Representatives.

The Greenwood Commonwealth said that the county was an "easy target" for school merging due to the difficulties in all three school districts, and that the scenario "doesn't leave them with much leverage to argue in favor of the status quo. And because none of them does well, none of them can object to assuming someone else's headaches. All three are beset with them." Later that month, the State Board of Education approved the consolidation of the Drew School District and the Sunflower County School District, and if Senate Bill 2330 is approved, Indianola School District will be added.

In May 2012 Governor of Mississippi Phil Bryant signed the bill into law, requiring all three districts to consolidate. SB2330 stipulates that if a county has three school districts all under conservatorship by the Mississippi Department of Education will have them consolidated into one school district serving the entire county. As of July 1, 2012, the Drew School District was consolidated with the Sunflower County School District.

==== Private schools ====
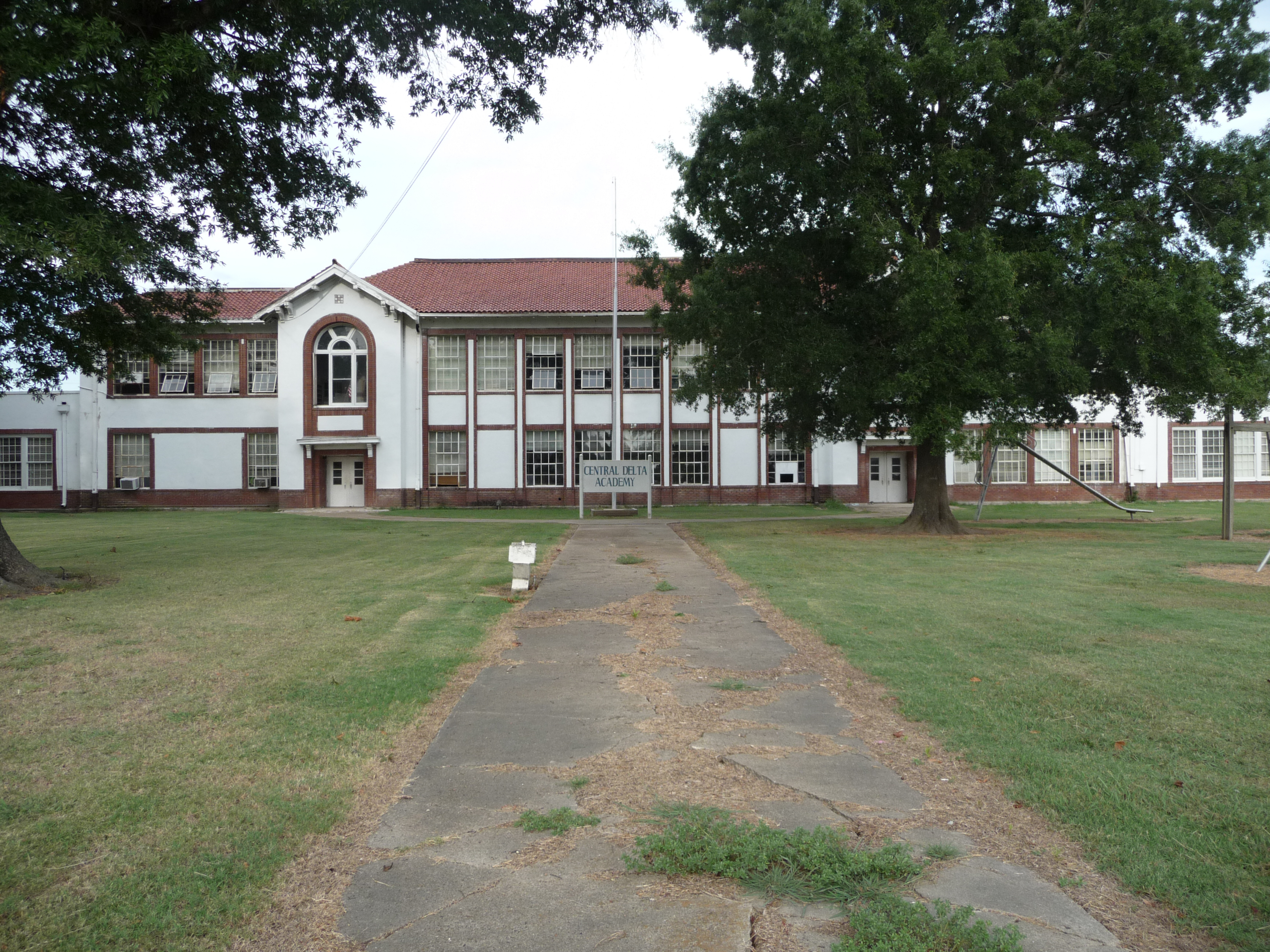
Central Delta Academy

- Private School
  - Indianola Academy (Indianola)
  - North Sunflower Academy (Unincorporated area)
  - Restoration Ministries Christian Academy

The Central Delta Academy in Inverness closed on May 21, 2010.

Three of the private schools (Indianola Academy, North Sunflower, and Central Delta) originated as segregation academies.

Pillow Academy in unincorporated Leflore County, near Greenwood, enrolls some students from Sunflower County. It originally was a segregation academy.

=== Public libraries ===
The Sunflower County Library provides library services. The administration is in Indianola, and the system operates libraries in Drew, Indianola, Inverness, Moorhead, and Ruleville.

== Media ==
The Enterprise-Tocsin, a newspaper based out of Indianola, is distributed throughout Sunflower County. The Bolivar Commercial is also distributed in Sunflower County.

== Communities ==
J. Todd Moye, author of Let the People Decide: Black Freedom and White Resistance Movements in Sunflower County, Mississippi, 1945-1986, said "Sunflower County has always been overwhelmingly rural." At the end of the 20th century, the county had just four "main towns of any size".

=== Cities ===
- Indianola (county seat)
- Drew
- Moorhead
- Ruleville
- Shaw (mostly in Bolivar County)

=== Towns ===
- Doddsville
- Inverness
- Sunflower

=== Unincorporated communities ===
- Baird
- Baltzer
- Blaine
- Boyer
- Caile
- Dockery
- Fairview
- Heathman
- Holly Ridge
- Kinlock
- Linn
- Lombardy
- Minot
- Mississippi State Penitentiary (Parchman)
- Pentecost
- Rome
- Roundaway
- Steiner
- Stephenville

=== Ghost towns ===
- Cottondale
- Inwood
- Promised Land

== Notable people ==
- Jerry Butler (singer & Rock and Roll Hall of Fame inductee, born 1939)
- Willie Best (actor, 1916–1962)
- Craig Claiborne (New York Times food editor, 1920-2000)
- James Eastland (U.S. Senator from Mississippi, 1904–1986)
- C. L. Franklin, father of Aretha Franklin (minister, civil rights activist, 1915–1984)
- Fannie Lou Hamer (civil rights activist, 1917–1977)
- B.B. King (bluesman, 1925–2015)
- Sam Lacey (retired NBA basketball player, 1948–present)
- Archie Manning (NFL quarterback, 1971–1984)
- Charlie Patton (bluesman, 1891–1934)
- Johnny Russell (country singer)

== See also ==
- Mississippi Delta
- National Register of Historic Places listings in Sunflower County, Mississippi
