= Holly Ridge, Mississippi =

- Unincorporated community
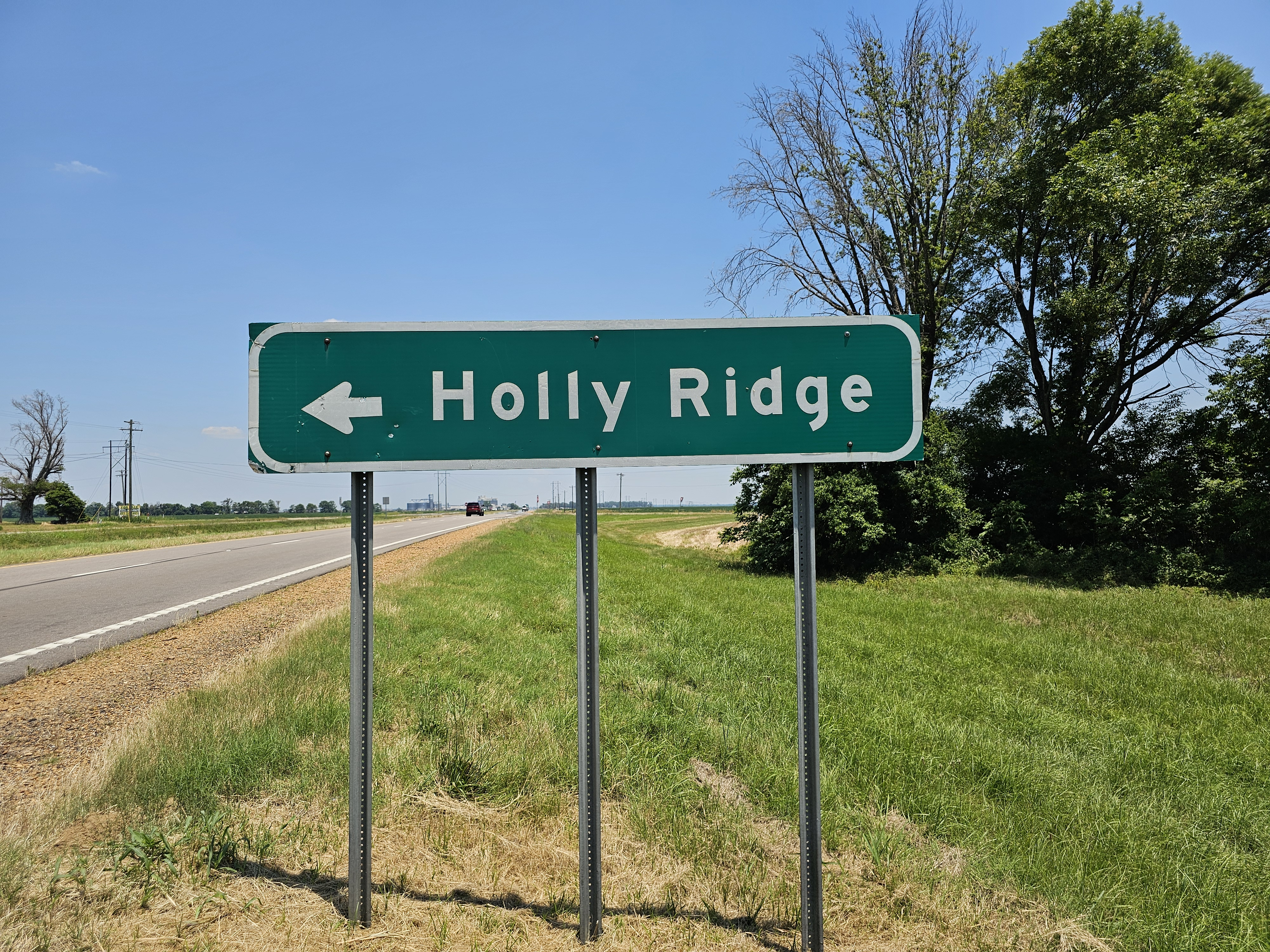
- Highway sign outside of Holly Ridge

- Location within Mississippi Location within the United States
- Country: United States
- State: Mississippi
- County: Sunflower
- Elevation: 125 ft (38 m)
- Time zone: UTC-6 (Central (CST))
  - Summer (DST): UTC-5 (CDT)
- ZIP code: 38751
- Area code: 662
- GNIS feature ID: 671334

Holly Ridge is an unincorporated community in Sunflower County, Mississippi. It is located in the Mississippi Delta, approximately five miles west of Indianola.

== Blues history ==
The early Delta blues guitarist and singer, Charley Patton (1891–1934), is buried in Holly Ridge. The Mississippi Blues Trail placed its first historic marker at the cemetery in dedication to his iconic status as a bluesman. Fellow blues musicians, Willie James Foster (1921–2001) and Asie Payton (1937–1997), the latter of whom lived in the community, are also buried in the same cemetery.
