= McNutt, Mississippi =

- Unincorporated community
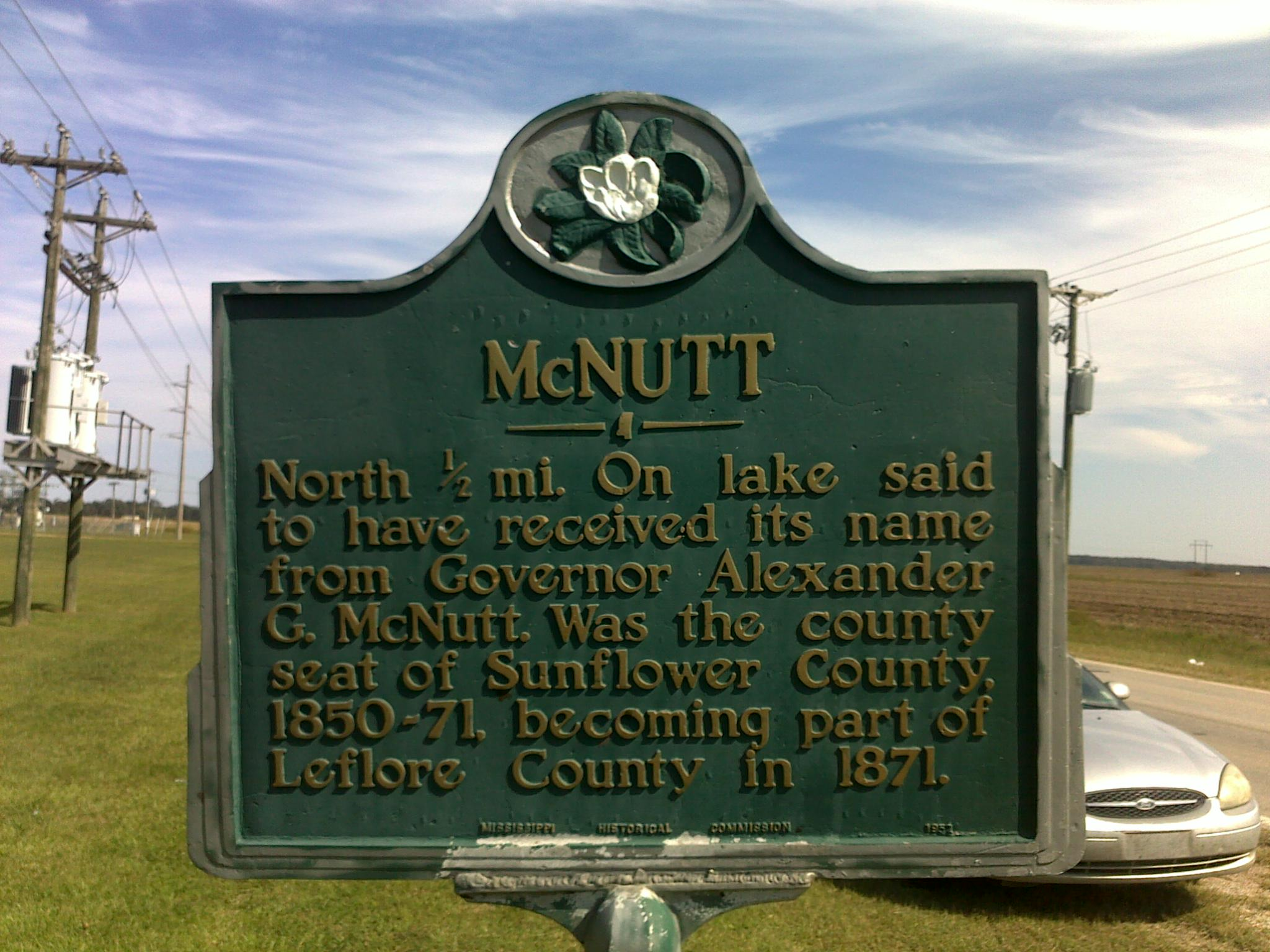
- McNutt Historical Marker located on Mississippi Highway 442

- Location within Mississippi Location within the United States
- Coordinates: 33°38′50″N 90°22′20″W
- Country: United States
- State: Mississippi
- County: Leflore
- Elevation: 128 ft (39 m)
- Time zone: UTC-6 (Central (CST))
  - Summer (DST): UTC-5 (CDT)
- ZIP code: 38952
- Area code: 662
- GNIS feature ID: 684207

McNutt is an unincorporated community located in Leflore County, Mississippi. McNutt is located west of Schlater, just off Mississippi Highway 442.

It is part of the Greenwood, Mississippi micropolitan area.

== History ==
McNutt was named for McNutt Lake, which was in turn named for Alexander McNutt, the Governor of Mississippi from 1838 to 1842. McNutt served as the first county seat of Sunflower County when the county was formed in 1844. The first courthouse was a log cabin, which was eventually replaced by a brick building. When Leflore County was formed in 1871 from portions of Carroll, Sunflower and Tallahatchie counties, the courthouse records and building became property of the new county. After Greenwood became the county seat of Leflore County, the former county buildings in McNutt were sold and became private property. The former courthouse was then used as a masonic lodge, school building, church, and parsonage. During the Civil War, Federal troops passed through McNutt as part of the Yazoo Pass expedition.

McNutt was essentially abandoned when it was bypassed by the Georgia Pacific Railway. The community was once home to a Catholic church that was part of the Diocese of Natchez and was served occasionally by a priest from Yazoo. A post office operated under the name McNutt from 1847 to 1909.

In 1900, the community had a population of 62.
