= Boyer, Mississippi =

Community in Sunflower County, Mississippi, US

- Unincorporated community
- Location within Mississippi Location within the United States
- Coordinates: 33°32′12″N 90°38′16″W
- Country: United States
- State: Mississippi
- County: Sunflower
- Elevation: 121 ft (37 m)
- Time zone: UTC-6 (Central (CST))
  - Summer (DST): UTC-5 (CDT)
- ZIP code: 38751
- Area code: 662
- GNIS feature ID: 667496

Boyer is an unincorporated community located in Sunflower County, Mississippi. Boyer is located on Steiner-Boyer Road and is approximately 7 miles (11 km) north of Indianola and approximately 4 miles (6.4 km) south of Roundaway.

== Cemetery ==
Boyer Cemetery is a historical cemetery located in Boyer. The cemetery is located on Steiner-Boyer Road in Boyer, Mississippi. The Boyer Cemetery dates back to the early 19th century in the early years of Mississippi being a state and is marked by a historical marker.
