= Hugh O. Pentecost =

American lawyer

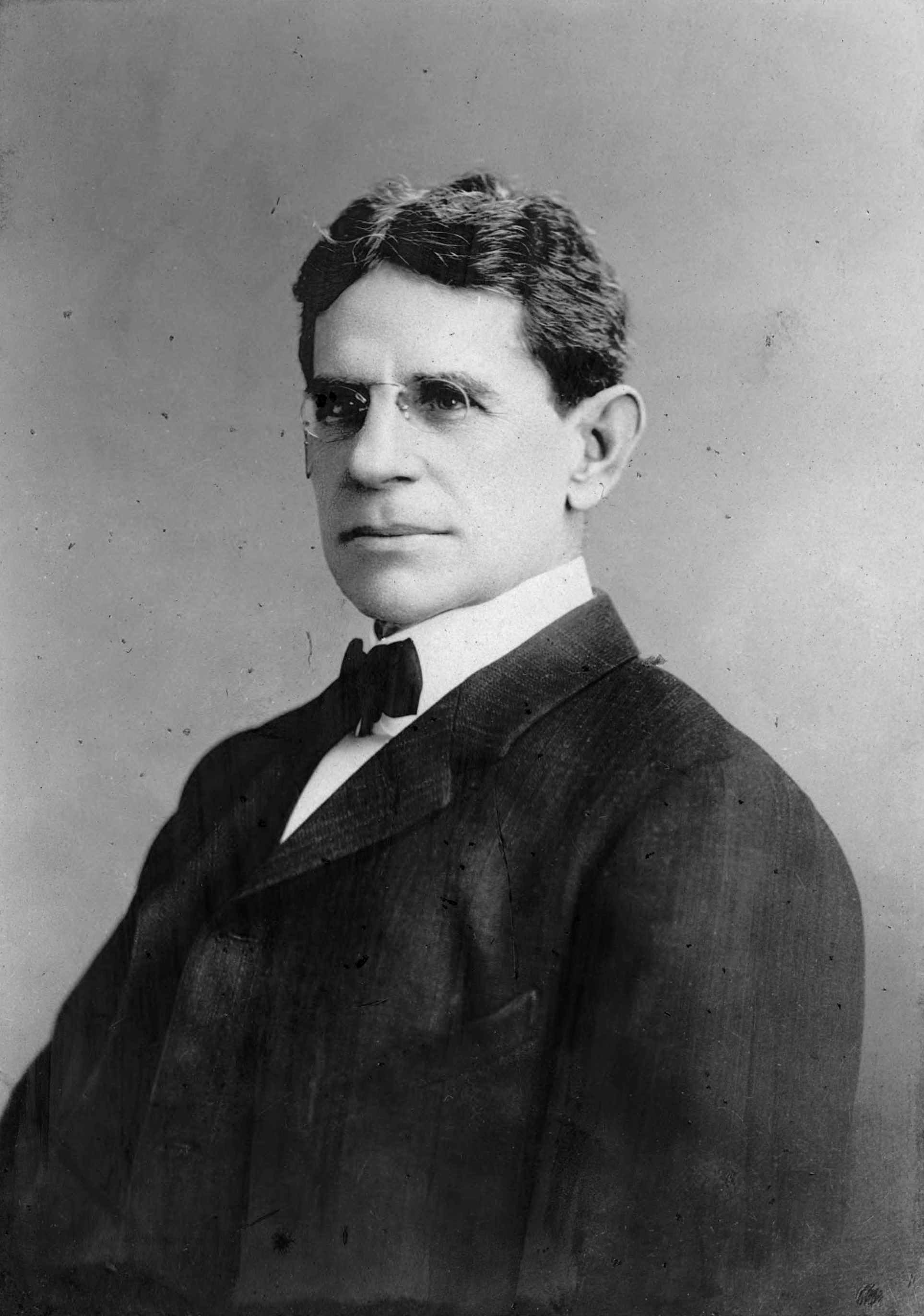
- Portrait by George G. Rockwood c. 1900
- Born: 1848; New Harmony, Indiana, U.S.
- Died: February 2, 1907 (aged 58–59); New York City, U.S.
- Occupations: Minister, editor, lawyer, lecturer
- Political party: Socialist

Hugh Owen Pentecost (1848 – February 2, 1907) was an American minister, editor, lawyer, Georgist, and lecturer.

== Early life, preaching, and radicalization ==
Pentecost was born in 1848 at New Harmony, Indiana, to Emma Flower and Hugh Lockett Pentecost. Hugh was the fourth of five children, along with his eldest sister, Cora; his older brother, George Frederick (who also went on to become a nationally renowned preacher); another sister, Emma; and a younger sister, Rosa, who died in childhood. Hugh was given the middle name "Owen" after Robert Owen, the patron of the utopian socialist community that Pentecost's parents had joined at New Harmony. At the age of two, his family moved to Albion, Illinois.

After a short stint as a printer in Kentucky, Pentecost attended Colgate University in upstate New York, and after graduating in 1872, he entered the Baptist ministry. He preached at Baptist churches in Brooklyn; Long Island; Westerly, Rhode Island; Hartford, Connecticut; and Brooklyn. In 1871, while pastoring the Rockville Center, Long Island Baptist Church, he married Laura Anderson, the daughter of a successful Brooklyn confectioner. In 1873, Hugh and Laura left the Baptists in a dispute over the practice of "Free Communion," and then organized their own "Church of the People." They left that church, in turn, during the summer of 1875, after they challenged a church member over his handling of funds. Hugh Pentecost took on another assignment in Westerly, Rhode Island; in 1877, his wife, Laura, died of rheumatic fever.

In 1880, while in Hartford, he married Ida Gatling, the daughter of Richard Jordan Gatling. Shortly after his wedding, he once again became a pastor for a Baptist church in Brooklyn, but Pentecost left the Baptist denomination, and became a pastor for non-denominational church in Manhattan and then the Belleville-Avenue Congregation Church in Newark, New Jersey.

Pentecost became widely known for his eloquent sermons and his support for anti-poverty causes, Georgist land reform, socialism, and nonresistance. In 1887, he began to make speeches for Henry George's Anti-Poverty Society, ran and lost a race for mayor of Newark on the United Labor ticket, and delivered a sermon in protest of the hanging of the Haymarket martyrs. His increasingly political and theologically unorthodox sermons led to controversy within his congregation in Newark; in December 1887, he resigned from his post and announced that "My studies furthermore have given me such changed opinions regarding many fundamental doctrinal ideas that I feel I can no longer remain in the orthodox ministry or the orthodox church."

After leaving the orthodox ministry, Pentecost opened an independent "Unity Congregation" in Newark. He gave sermons and lectures on radical topics, becoming increasingly sympathetic to anarchism, and edited a newspaper, the Twentieth Century, in which he published articles and correspondence on anarchism, Georgism, democracy, and labor reform. He often corresponded and shared platforms with radicals such as Benjamin Tucker and Daniel De Leon.

== Legal career ==
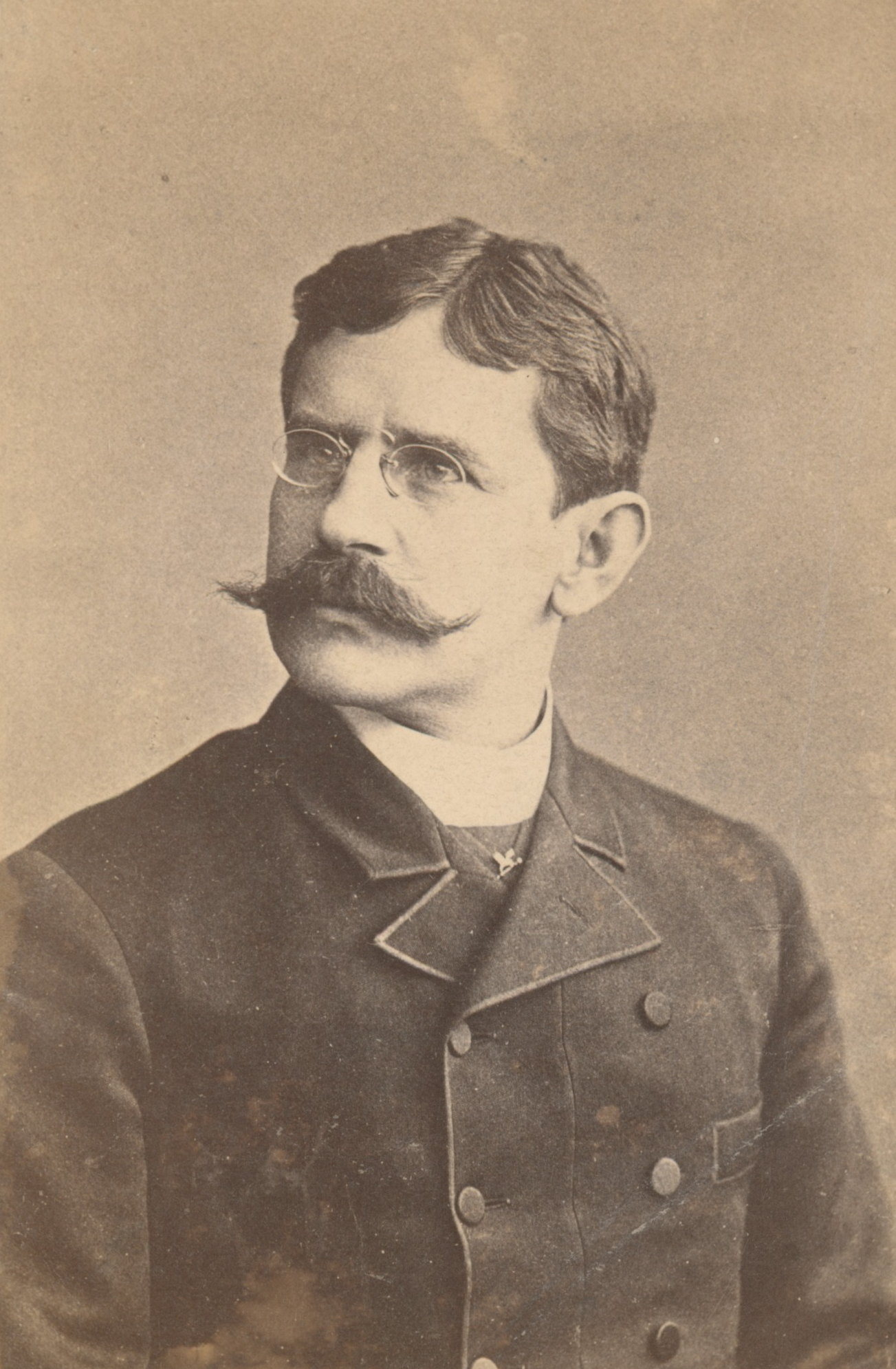
Pentecost c. 1890s

Under pressure from his family, he began to study law in 1891, and went into practice in 1892. In December 1893, John R. Fellows appointed him as an Assistant District Attorney in New York City, but news of the appointment soon provoked controversy over both his lack of experience as a lawyer, and his radical political and religious views.

In response to the protests, Fellows claimed that he had known nothing of Pentecost's views at the time of the appointment. Fellows withdrew the appointment, and Pentecost prepared a statement, in which he disavowed his protests against the Haymarket hangings, and stated that "he who says that I am or ever was a Socialist or Anarchist, says what is not true." He added that "I now know that we live in a world in which the government and the social system which prevail are the best that human beings, in their highest wisdom, have been able to construct; that law is necessary and must be obeyed if society is to exist at all; that punishments must be inflicted on those who infringe the personal or property rights of others. I am now as firm a believer as any one in the practical necessity of the governmental system we have and enjoy." Pentecost stated that although he believed he could faithfully fulfill the position with his current beliefs, he would decline the position so as not to embarrass Fellows by association with him. Pentecost's statement, which was reprinted in the Twentieth Century and many newspapers, drew sharp criticism from some of Pentecost's radical friends, who believed him to be dissembling about his views in order to curry public opinion.

After the withdrawal of his appointment, Pentecost continued in private practice and became prominent in both civil and criminal law. In 1896, he unsuccessfully defended Carl Feigenbaum, who was executed for the murder of Mrs Juliana Hoffmann. Feigenbaum gained posthumous infamy as an unlikely suspect in the Jack the Ripper murders.

== Return to radical politics ==
In 1897, Pentecost returned to lecturing on political and religious topics, and reopened his "Unity Congregation."

Pentecost repeatedly spoke out against the turn-of-the-century prohibitionist campaigns to shut down saloons, gambling, and brothels. He argued that the "vice crusades" little more than hypocritical cover for the Republican Party's ambitions to unseat Tammany Hall in the New York City government. Pentecost argued that vice laws only relocated vice behind closed doors, and created opportunities for police corruption. Instead of crackdowns by city government, he argued, all vice laws should be repealed, as "The true remedy for all evil is in freedom. Truth makes you free."

In 1906, Pentecost joined the Socialist Party of America, and spoke at a Socialist Party protest against William Randolph Hearst's gubernatorial campaign.

== Illness and death ==
Pentecost fell ill with stomach trouble late in 1906, and failed to recover after a surgical operation. After seven weeks of illness, he died at his home in New York on February 2, 1907. He was survived by his wife, Ida, and two grown daughters.

== Works Online ==
- "Anarchism," Twentieth Century, July 4, 1889. Hosted at DeadAnarchists.org.
- "The Crime of Owning Vacant Land," Twentieth Century, November 28, 1889. Hosted at DeadAnarchists.org.
- First Anniversary Address for Unity Congregation, Twentieth Century on January 10, 1889. Hosted at DeadAnarchists.org.
- "A Gigantic Poorhouse," Twentieth Century, October 10, 1889. Hosted at DeadAnarchists.org.
- "Murder by Law," Twentieth Century, August 15, 1889.
- "The Sins of Government," Twentieth Century on March 13, 1890. Hosted at DeadAnarchists.org.
- "Thomas Paine," Twentieth Century, February 6, 1890. Hosted at DeadAnarchists.org.
