= List of United States post office murals in Mississippi =

Following is a list of United States post office murals created in Mississippi between 1934 and 1943.

Location	Mural title	Image	Artist	Date	Notes	NRHP listed
Amory	Amory, Mississippi, 1889		John McCrady	1939	A panoramic view of Amory's main street in 1889	1988
Batesville	Cotton Plantation		Eve Kottgen	1942		
Bay St. Louis	Life on the Coast		Louis Raynaud	1938		
Old Post Office, Booneville	Scenic and Historic Booneville		Stefan Hirsch	1943	oil on canvas; completed under the Treasury Bureau's Section of Fine Arts program at the cost of $750. The Old Post Office is in the NRHP-listed Downtown Booneville Historic District.	1998
Carthage	Lumbermen Rolling a Log		Peter Dalton	1938		1983
Columbus	Out of Soil		Beulah Bettersworth	1940	oil on canvas	1983
Crystal Springs	Harvest		Henry La Cagnina	1943		1993
Durant	Erosion, Reclamation and Conservation of the Soil		Isadore Tuberoff	1942		
Eupora	Cotton Farm		Thomas Savage	1945		
Forest	Forest Logger		Julien Binford	1941		1993
Hazelhurst	Life in the Mississippi Cotton Belt		Auriel Bessemer	1939		
Houston	Post Near Houston, Natchez, 1803		Byron Burford Jr.	1941		
Indianola	White Gold in the Delta		Beulah Bettersworth	1939	destroyed in the 1960s	
Jackson	Pursuits of Life in Mississippi		Simka Simkhovitch	1938	in the James O. Eastland United States Courthouse	
Leland	Ginnin' Cotton		Stuart R. Purser	1940	tempera; winner of the 48-State Mural Competition	1983
Louisville	Crossroads		Karl Wolfe	1938		
Macon	Signing of the Treaty of Dancing Rabbit Creek		S. Douglass Crockwell	1944		
Magnolia	Cotton Harvest		John H. Fyfe	1939		1993
Magnolia	July 4 Celebration at Sheriff Bacof's		John H. Fyfe	1939		1993
Magnolia	Magnolia in 1889		John H. Fyfe	1939		1993
New Albany	Milking Time		Roger Cleaver Purdy	1939		
Newton	Economic Life in Newton in the Earl 1940s		Mary Boggs Frank Boggs	1942	oil on canvas	
Okolona	The Richness of the Soil		Harold Egan	1939	painted over within days of completion	
Pascagoula	Legend of the Singing River		Lorin Thompson	1939	damaged in 2005 by Hurricane Katrina	
Picayune	Lumber Region of Mississippi		Donald H. Robertson	1940		
Pontotoc	The Wedding of Ortez and SaOuana – Christmas, 1540		Joseph Pollet	1939	oil on canvas	
Tylertown	Rural Mississippi – from Early Days to Present		Lucile Blanch	1941	tempera	
Vicksburg	Vicksburg, Its Character and Industries		Henriette A. Oberteuffer	1939	oil on canvas; former U.S. Post Office and Courthouse now privately owned	
Waynesboro	Waynesboro Landscape		Ross E. Braught	1942	oil on canvas	
