= Will Green Poindexter =

American politician (1944–2024)

Member of the Mississippi House of Representatives from the multiple district 31st (1984-1993) 32nd (1980-1984) 13th (1976-1980)
- In office January 1976 – January 1993
- Preceded by: Otis B. Bennett; Clyde E. Wood
- Succeeded by: William Richardson

Personal details
- Born: January 10, 1944 Greenwood, Mississippi, U.S.
- Died: November 25, 2024 (aged 80) Inverness, Mississippi, U.S.
- Party: Democratic

William Green Poindexter III (January 10, 1944 – November 25, 2024) was an American politician who served as a member of the Mississippi House of Representatives from 1976 to 1993.

== Early life ==
William Green Poindexter was born on January 10, 1944, in Greenwood, Mississippi. He graduated from Greenwood High School, and graduated from Mississippi State University in 1967 with a bachelor's degree, double majoring in history and government. After his graduation, Poindexter spent one year under the staff of U. S. senator from Mississippi John C. Stennis in Washington, D. C. Poindexter then returned to Sunflower and Leflore Counties in Mississippi where he farmed.

== Political career ==
Poindexter was elected Mayor of Inverness, Mississippi, in 1971, and became the youngest person elected to that office in town history. After his tenure ended, Poindexter was elected to represent the 13th district (Sunflower County) in the Mississippi House of Representatives in 1975 for the 1976–1980 term. He was re-elected in 1979 for the 32nd district for the 1980–1984 term, and was also re-elected in 1983 (31st district), 1987 (31st district), and 1991 (31st district). In 1992, the House seats were required to be redistricted to better reflect the state's black population. Poindexter lost the following 1992 election to William Richardson, a black teacher at Gentry High School in Indianola. In 1993, Poindexter joined the staff of Mississippi Governor Kirk Fordice as a legislative liaison. He also served as a liaison for Fordice on agricultural issues.

== Death ==
Poindexter died at his home in Inverness, Mississippi, on November 25, 2024, at the age of 80.
