= Restoration Ministries Christian Academy =

K-12 Christian school in Indianola, Mississippi

Coordinates: 33.457635°N 90.627413°W

Restoration Ministries Christian Academy (RMCA) is a private K-12 Christian school located in Indianola, Mississippi. An outreach ministry of the Restoration Ministries of the Apostolic Faith, it as of 2015 has 84 students from the counties of Humphreys, Leflore, Sunflower, and Washington. Its student body is mostly black, and many black families wishing to avoid the public school system, as of 2012, choose to enroll their children in RMCA instead of the majority white Indianola Academy.

It was established in 2005 by Richard and Vivian Michelle Jenkins, two pastors.

It holds an annual May Day and on that day it gives the titles of "king and queen" to a pair of students from the elementary level and a pair of students from the high school level.
