= Heathman Plantation =

Historic house in Mississippi, United States

- Heathman Plantation Commissary
- U.S. National Register of Historic Places
- U.S. National Historic Site
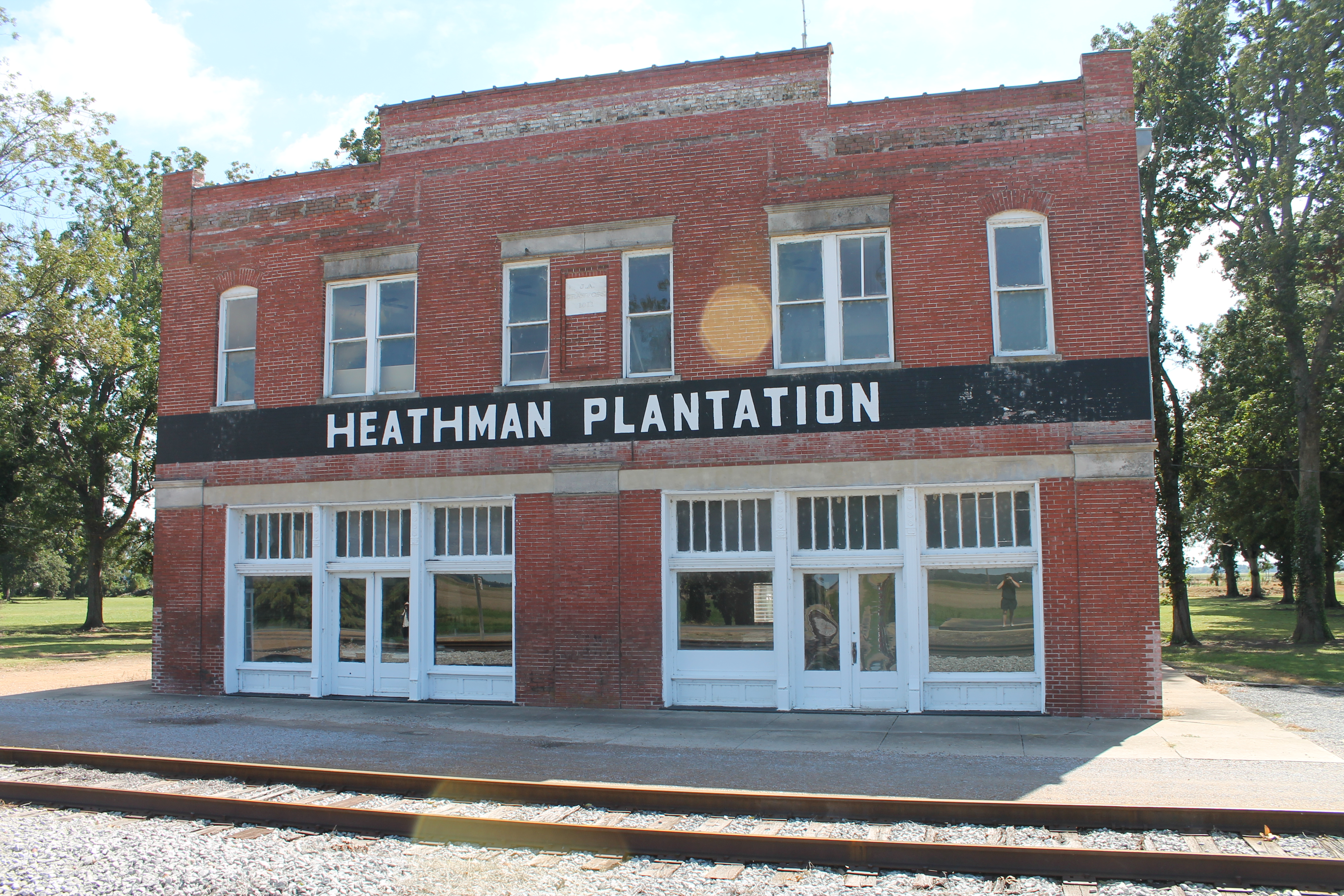
- Commissary on the Heathman Plantation

- Location within Mississippi
- Location: Heathman, Mississippi
- Coordinates: 33°26′25.6″N 90°43′07.4″W
- Built: 1848
- NRHP reference No.: 12000923
- Added to NRHP: 2012

The Heathman Plantation, also known as Dogwood Ridge Plantation and Billups Plantation, is a historical site that was a former cotton plantation in Heathman, Mississippi. It was founded in 1848 as a forced-labor operation worked by African American people enslaved by the land's white owners.

== History ==
The plantation is located at the intersection of Highway 82 and Heathman Road in Heathman near Indianola, Mississippi, in Sunflower County, Mississippi. In 1848, James Brown built the Dogwood Ridge Plantation as an 8,000-acre cotton plantation.

In 1871, James Martin Heathman, who was married to Lillie Brown, the daughter of James Brown, purchased the plantation. He renamed it the Heathman Plantation. He died in 1885. Three years later, she married J. A. Crawford in 1888.

It was later known as the Billups Plantation.

== Heritage significance ==
The commissary has been listed on the National Register of Historic Places since November 14, 2012.
