= Hugh M. Arant =

American farmer and politician (1927–1995)

Member of the Mississippi House of Representatives from the 15th district
- In office January 1968 – January 1972 Serving with Charles M. Deaton, Estes C. McDaniel, O. B. Bennett, Clyde E. Wood
- Preceded by: N/A (new district)
- Succeeded by: (after redistricting); C. B. Newman; Douglas Abraham; H. L. Merideth Jr. Hainon Miller

Personal details
- Born: November 22, 1927 Black Hawk, Mississippi
- Died: May 7, 1995 (aged 67) Jackson, Mississippi
- Party: Democratic
- Children: 3

Hugh Miller "Buddy" Arant (November 22, 1927 – May 7, 1995) was an American farmer and politician. He was a member of the Mississippi House of Representatives from 1968 to 1972.

== Biography ==
Hugh Miller Arant was born on November 22, 1927, in Black Hawk, Mississippi. He served in the U. S. Army in World War II, and graduated from Mississippi State University in 1949. He was a farmer and businessman. While living in Ruleville, Mississippi, in 1967, he was elected to represent the 15th District, composed of Leflore and Sunflower Counties, as a Democrat in the Mississippi House of Representatives and served for the 1968–1972 term. For 16 years, he was the president of the Mississippi Farm Bureau. He died on May 7, 1995, of heart failure in the Mississippi Baptist Medical Center in Jackson, Mississippi.

== Personal life ==
Arant was married to Kathryn Carver; they had two sons and a daughter.
