= Minnie M. Cox =

African-American teacher and postmaster (1869–1933)

Minnie Cox
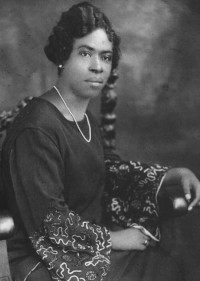
- Cox in c. 1900
- Born: Minnie M. Geddings; 1869; Lexington, Mississippi, U.S.
- Died: 1933 (aged 63–64)
- Education: Fisk University
- Occupations: Postmaster, teacher, businessperson
- Employer: United States Post Office Department
- Political party: Republican

Minnie M. (Geddings) Cox (1869–1933) was an American teacher who was appointed the first black postmaster in Mississippi, following closely behind Anna M. Dumas, who was appointed to the same position in 1872 in Covington, Louisiana. Though she made national headlines after President Theodore Roosevelt refused to release her from her position after threats of violence from whites in Indianola, Cox was dedicated to equal rights in Mississippi. Responding to the disparities in resources available to black citizens for banking and insurance, she opened her own bank and insurance companies to protect their assets.

== Early life ==
Minnie M. Geddings was born in 1869 to Mary Geddings and William Geddings in Lexington, Mississippi. Though not much is known about her early life, it is possible that her family fared better than many other black families in the Mississippi Delta as her parents owned a restaurant and she was able to attend Fisk University, a historically black university in Nashville, Tennessee. Cox was part of one of the largest cohorts at the time, with 100 graduates completing studies at the normal school to earn teaching degrees in 1888. A year later, she married Wellington Cox. Her husband was also a teacher and was principal of the Indianola Colored Public School until 1890, when he started a position with the United Railway Postal Service. Mr. Cox was able to save enough money to purchase 160 acres of land a few years before their marriage, and continuously bought and sold land thereafter. Through these ventures, the Coxes entered into the small community of wealthy black Mississippians at the time, and lived in the white section of town. Mr. Cox served as chairman for the Republican Executive Committee of Sunflower County for five years and as a city alderman for one year.

In 1891, during the administration of President Benjamin Harrison, she was appointed postmaster of Indianola. Cox lost her job in 1892 under President Grover Cleveland but was reappointed in 1897 by President William McKinley and continued to serve under President Theodore Roosevelt. When Cox's appointment expired in 1904, the Indianola post office reopened with a different postmaster. Cox and her husband returned to Indianola, where they opened the Delta Penny Savings Bank, one of the earliest black-owned banks in the state. They also founded one of the first black-owned insurance companies in the United States to offer whole life insurance, the Mississippi Life Insurance Company. They were strong supporters of black businesses in the state.

After her husband died in 1925, Cox remarried. She and her second husband, George Key Hamilton, moved to Tennessee and later to Rockford, Illinois. She died in 1933.

== Serving as postmistress and the Indianola affair ==
When Minnie Cox served as postmistress, the position could only be appointed by the president. When President Benjamin Harrison appointed her in 1891, her prominence in the community and support of the Republican Party secured her first term, though the lack of a qualified white candidate may have played a role. Cox again assumed the position under President William McKinley and remained in the role under President Teddy Roosevelt. Though she was praised for her work in streamlining the mail system for the community, she took her position much further, installing a telephone for patrons' convenience and paying delinquent rent throughout the community out of her own pocket. Her leadership earned much praise from President Roosevelt, but the town of Indianola began to divide over her role, not because of her work but because she was a black woman. A.B. Weeks, a white man, wanted the position and frequently sent letters to the White House detailing his qualifications to take the position from her. Roosevelt declined to respond. Weeks was the brother-in-law of city mayor J.L. Davis. A campaign to remove her from the position, started by Weeks and Davis, was circulated by many other white citizens in Sunflower County, including future governor James K. Vardaman. After the petition was circulated, Cox announced that she would complete her term as postmistress but would not seek reappointment. On December 4, 1902, she wrote to President Roosevelt that: "It is my opinion that if I don't resign, there will be trouble and cause the town to lose post office facilities. This is my home and I feel a deep interest in the town and its people." The Clarion-Ledger reported that the town generally believed, "she was polite and obliging, and had, and still has, the good will of practically the entire citizenship...there was never friction between the office and its patrons...She was regarded here simply like any other negro who attends strictly to business and displays the proper respect for the impassable link between the two races." In Mississippi, Cox's skin color was enough to force her out of the office, whether the replacement was qualified—or even truly interested—to run the post office.

Roosevelt initially rejected her resignation, aware of the rising racial tension in the South and the reports of happenings in Sunflower County. He hoped to find a more peaceful solution that would allow Cox to safely remain in the role. However, Vardaman's gubernatorial rhetoric of the "negro menace", a rise in the violence perpetuated by the Ku Klux Klan, and the redefinition of political parties put Cox at risk. White mobs began several attacks on black professionals in Indianola. A black porter was accused of being rude to a white employee at the Brooklyn Bridge Store, resulting in a white mob's decision to close all black businesses. Dr. J.C. Fulton, a prosperous doctor in town who ran in similar circles with Minnie Cox was threatened and run out of town. Roosevelt finally agreed to her resignation, but allowed her to keep her $1,100 salary through the end of her term and effectively closed the Indianola post office, writing to Cox that, "This was all I could do and the least I could do." The post office remained closed for most of 1903 while Roosevelt waited for Indianola to agree to keep Cox in office without any issue. Instead, the town sent a representative to nearby Heathman, Mississippi to pick up and distribute the mail. In 1904, Roosevelt was forced to reopen the post office without Minnie Cox, as federal law required all county seats to have a running post office. He required that no one related to the mob that forced Minnie out could succeed her. By then, Minnie and her family had fled to Birmingham, but eventually returned to Mississippi and began two successful businesses to meet the needs of black Mississippians in the era of Jim Crow. The situation became a national news story, sparking a debate about "race, states' rights, and federal power".

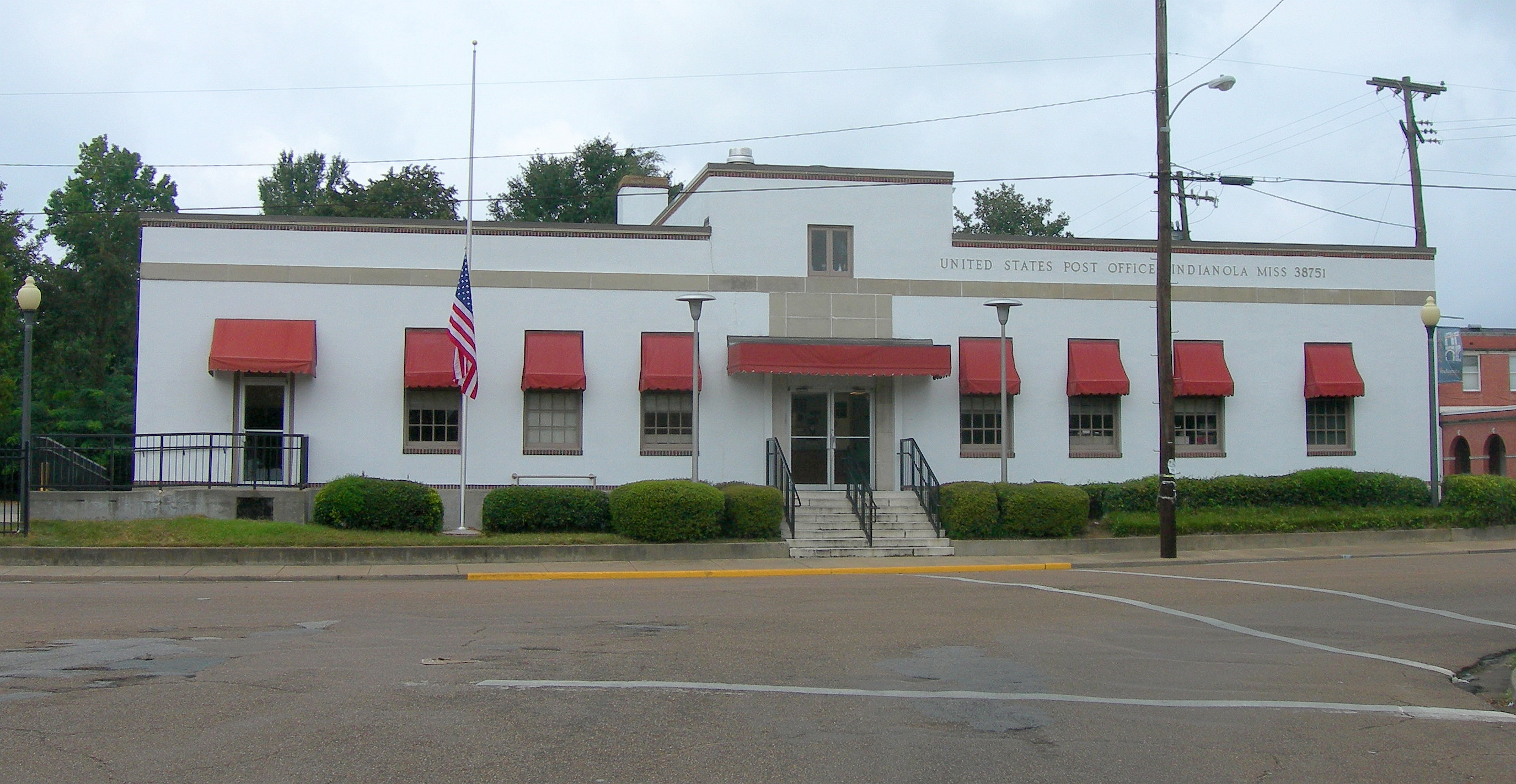
The Minnie Cox Post Office Building in Indianola.

== Honors ==
In 2008, a post office building in Indianola was named the Minnie Cox Post Office Building "in tribute to all that she accomplished by breaking barriers".

Cox Street and Wayne and Minnie Cox Park in Indianola are both named for Cox and her husband.

== See also ==
- Lynching of Frazier B. Baker and Julia Baker
