= Central Delta Academy =

Defunct segregation academy in Mississippi

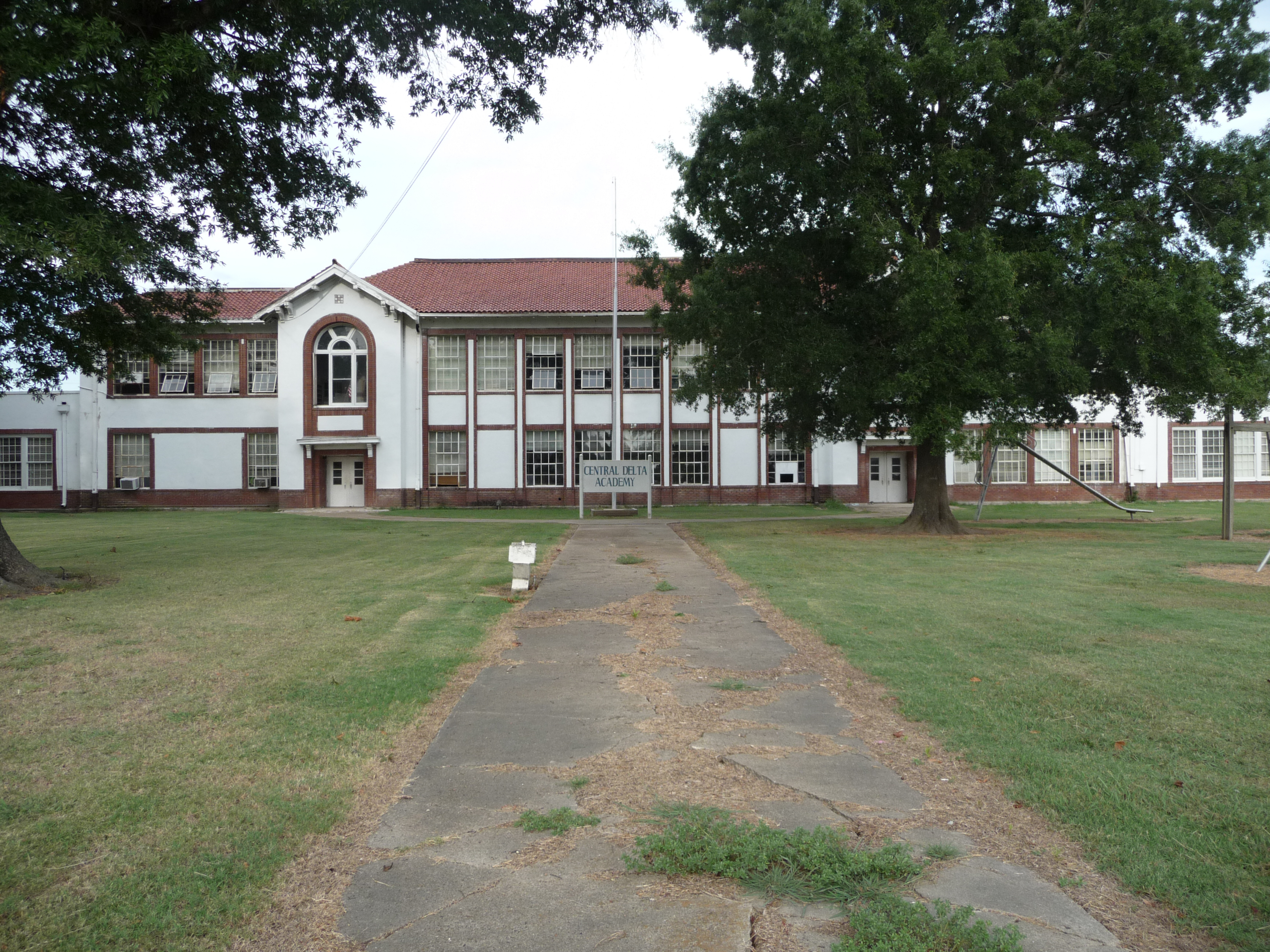

Location
- Inverness, Mississippi; United States; 33.3523426°N 90.5892573°W

Information
- Type: Private
- Opened: 1969; 57 years ago
- Closed: 2010; 16 years ago
- Colors: Royal blue & gold
- Team name: Tigers (males); Lady Tigers (females)

Central Delta Academy (CDA) was a private elementary and middle school, and later just elementary school, in Inverness, Mississippi, that operated from 1969 to 2010. It was founded as a segregation academy by white parents fleeing newly integrated public schools. The school closed on May 21, 2010; its building was auctioned off several weeks later.

== History ==
The Central Delta Academy's athletic mascot was "The Tigers." As of 1990, the Central Delta Academy and Inverness High School women's basketball teams had never faced off against each other. They were in different systems.

By the early 21st century, CDA and Inverness High School sponsored joint Homecoming weekends and events.

In 1987 the school's parent teacher organization published The Sharecropper, a collection of area recipes.

== Campus ==
The building was constructed in 1922 as Inverness School, the town's public "white school," which housed white students in grades 1-12 until the end of the era of racial segregation. Central Delta Academy was permitted to purchase the building and land from the public school system at the outset of mandatory desegregation, as nearly all of the parents of white students who attended the school when segregation was terminated refused to permit their children to attend school with black students, so they promptly established the all-white CDA for their children to attend. Since most of the white students who had formerly attended the school were no longer in the public schools which, in turn, diminished the public schools' infrastructure requirements, the facility was deemed excess to the public school system and title was transferred to CDA upon payment of a nominal price. This served to perpetuate racial segregation, albeit not thereafter government-sponsored segregation. The school operated until 2010, when the property was sold and the building demolished.

The school was situated on U.S. Highway 49, about 8 miles (13 km) south of Indianola and 15 miles (24 km) north of Belzoni.

== See also ==
- Education segregation in Mississippi Delta
