= Clyde E. Wood =

1968–1976 Mississippi House of Representative

Member of the Mississippi House of Representatives from the 13th district 15th (1968–1972)
- In office January 1968 – January 1976 Serving with 1972–1976: O. B. Bennett; 1968–1972: Charles M. Deaton, Estes C. McDaniel, O. B. Bennett, Hugh M. Arant
- Succeeded by: Will Green Poindexter

Personal details
- Born: June 27, 1918 Duck Hill, Mississippi
- Died: February 9, 2002 (aged 83) Indianola, Mississippi

Clyde Everett "Pete" Wood (June 27, 1918 – February 9, 2002) was an American politician and teacher. He was a member of the Mississippi House of Representatives from 1968 to 1976.

== Biography ==
Clyde Everett Wood was born on June 27, 1918, in Duck Hill, Mississippi. He graduated from Duck Hill High School in 1938 and from Sunflower Junior College in 1940. In 1942, Wood received a B. S. in Vocational Agriculture from Mississippi State University. Wood then served in the South Pacific under the U. S. Marine Corps during World War II, and then served for three years in the Korean War. In 1953, Wood received a M. A. in Agriculture with a minor in Entomology from Mississippi State University. He lived in Moorhead, Mississippi, at first as a cattle farmer, and then teaching vocational agriculture at the Sunflower Junior College. At one point, Wood also served on the board of directors of the South Sunflower County Hospital. Wood died on February 9, 2002, at the South Sunflower County Hospital in Indianola, Mississippi.

== Political career ==
In 1967, Wood was elected to represent the 15th district (composed of Leflore and Sunflower counties) in the Mississippi House of Representatives for the 1968–1972 term. After redistricting, Wood was re-elected to represent the 13th term (composed of Sunflower County) in the House for the 1972–1976 term.
