= Estes C. McDaniel =

American politician

Member of the Mississippi House of Representatives from the multiple district 15th (1968–1972) Leflore County (1964–1968)
- In office January 1964 – January 1972 Serving with 1968–1972: Charles M. Deaton, O. B. Bennett, Clyde E. Wood, Hugh M. Arant; 1964–1968: Charles M. Deaton
- Preceded by: Charles M. Deaton
- Succeeded by: (after redistricting); C. B. Newman; Douglas Abraham; H. L. Merideth Jr. Hainon Miller

Personal details
- Born: June 28, 1909 Pontotoc, Mississippi
- Died: April 22, 1984 (aged 74) Greenwood, Mississippi
- Party: Democratic

Estes Cruden "Mac" McDaniel (June 28, 1909 – April 22, 1984) was an American politician from Mississippi. He was a Democratic member of the Mississippi House of Representatives from 1964 to 1972.

== Biography ==
Estes Cruden McDaniel was born on June 28, 1909, in Pontotoc, Mississippi. He attended high school at Chickasaw College in Pontotoc, Mississippi. He received a bachelor's degree from the University of Oklahoma and a master's degree from Peabody College. He then was a superintendent of schools in Decatur, Alabama. In 1951, he moved to Greenville, Mississippi, where he was a farmer by occupation. In 1963, he was elected to represent Leflore County in the Mississippi House of Representatives and served in the 1964–1968 term. He was re-elected in 1967 and represented the 15th District (Leflore and Sunflower Counties) in the House for the 1968–1972 term. He died on April 22, 1984, at the Greenwood Leflore Hospital.
