= Inverness, Mississippi =

- Town
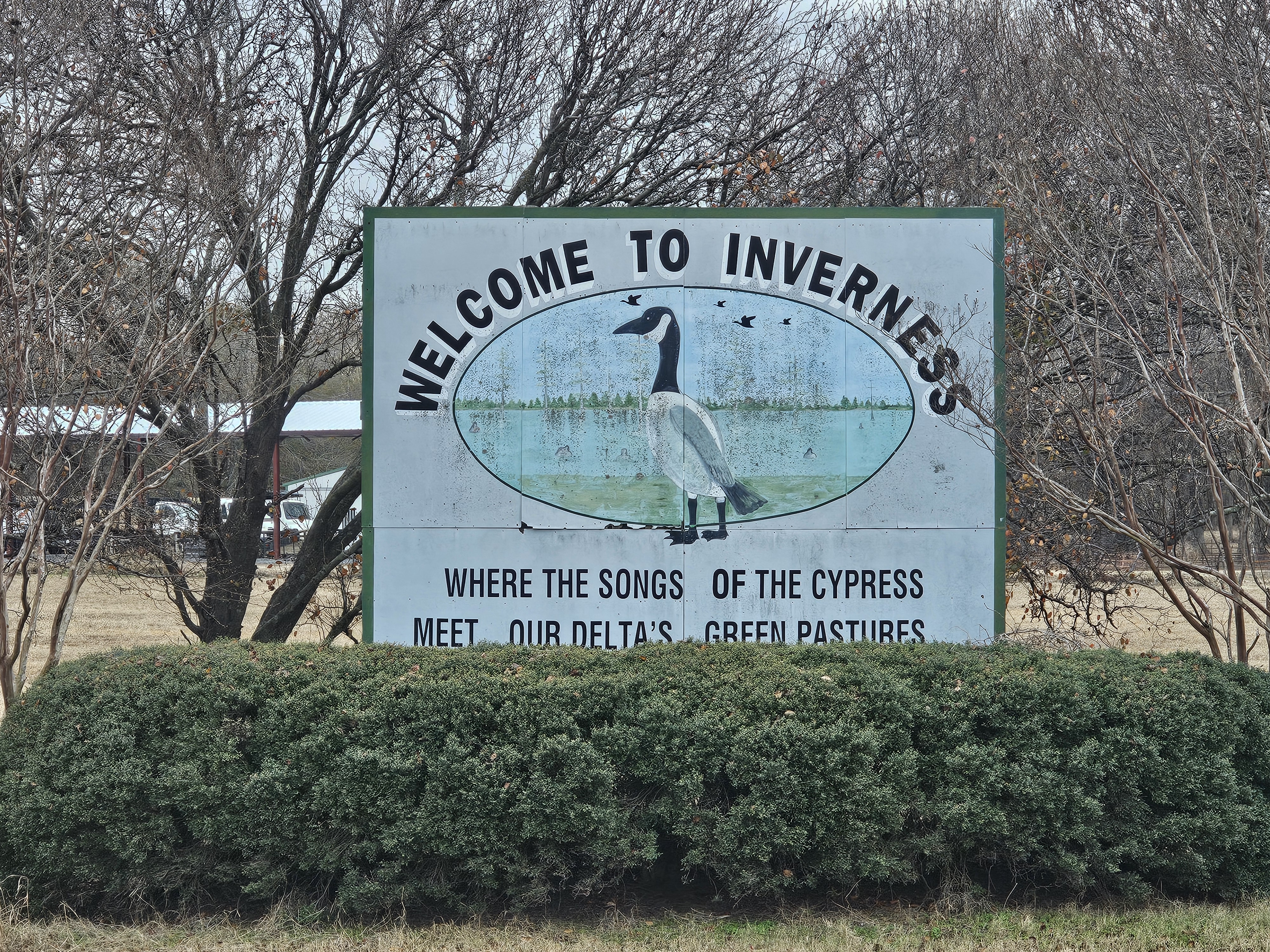
- Welcome sign in Inverness

- Flag

- Location of Inverness, Mississippi
- Coordinates: 33°21′15″N 90°35′28″W
- Country: United States
- State: Mississippi
- County: Sunflower

Area
  - Total: 1.44 sq mi (3.73 km^{2})
  - Land: 1.44 sq mi (3.73 km^{2})
  - Water: 0 sq mi (0.00 km^{2})
- Elevation: 118 ft (36 m)

Population (2020)
  - Total: 868
  - Density: 603/sq mi (232.7/km^{2})
- Time zone: UTC-6 (Central (CST))
  - Summer (DST): UTC-5 (CDT)
- ZIP code: 38753
- Area code: 662
- FIPS code: 28-35020
- GNIS feature ID: 2405890

Inverness is a town in Sunflower County, Mississippi, United States. The population was 868 at the 2020 census.

As the town had the largest cotton gin in the Mississippi Delta, it served as a gathering place for farmers from the region when they brought their cotton for processing. The town was heavily damaged by a tornado in 1971.

== Historic weather event ==
The small town was virtually destroyed on February 21, 1971, when an F5 tornado, one of many storms in the outbreak, struck more than a dozen towns in portions of Louisiana and Mississippi. A total of 36 people were killed in rural Mississippi as a result of the storm. Twenty-one of the victims were from Inverness, where a broad section of houses were destroyed.

== Geography ==
According to the United States Census Bureau, the town has a total area of 1.4 square miles (3.6 km^{2}), all land.

Inverness is about 90 miles (140 km) north of Jackson.

== Demographics ==
Historical population
Census	Pop.	Note	%±
1910	221		—
1920	561		153.8%
1930	683		21.7%
1940	677		−0.9%
1950	1,010		49.2%
1960	1,039		2.9%
1970	1,119		7.7%
1980	1,034		−7.6%
1990	1,174		13.5%
2000	1,153		−1.8%
2010	1,019		−11.6%
2020	868		−14.8%
U.S. Decennial Census

=== Racial and ethnic composition ===
Inverness town, Mississippi – Racial and ethnic composition Note: the US Census treats Hispanic/Latino as an ethnic category. This table excludes Latinos from the racial categories and assigns them to a separate category. Hispanics/Latinos may be of any race.
Race / Ethnicity (NH = Non-Hispanic)	Pop 2000	Pop 2010	Pop 2020	% 2000	% 2010	% 2020
White alone (NH)	456	485	432	39.55%	47.60%	49.77%
Black or African American alone (NH)	673	517	410	58.37%	50.74%	47.24%
Native American or Alaska Native alone (NH)	0	2	2	0.00%	0.20%	0.23%
Asian alone (NH)	9	6	1	0.78%	0.59%	0.12%
Native Hawaiian or Pacific Islander alone (NH)	0	0	0	0.00%	0.00%	0.00%
Other race alone (NH)	0	0	0	0.00%	0.00%	0.00%
Mixed race or Multiracial (NH)	2	2	14	0.17%	0.20%	1.61%
Hispanic or Latino (any race)	13	7	9	1.13%	0.69%	1.04%
Total	1,153	1,019	868	100.00%	100.00%	100.00%

=== 2020 census ===
As of the 2020 United States census, there were 868 people, 355 households, and 256 families residing in the town.

=== 2010 census ===
As of the 2010 United States census, there were 1,019 people living in the town. The racial makeup of the town was 50.7% Black, 47.6% White, 0.2% Native American, 0.6% Asian and 0.2% from two or more races. 0.7% were Hispanic or Latino of any race.

=== 2000 census ===
As of the census of 2000, there were 1,153 people, 411 households, and 311 families living in the town. The population density was 800.4 inhabitants per square mile (309.0/km^{2}). There were 432 housing units at an average density of 299.9 per square mile (115.8/km^{2}). The racial makeup of the town was 59.41% African American, 39.64% White, 0.78% Asian, and 0.17% from two or more races. Hispanic or Latino of any race were 1.13% of the population.

There were 411 households, out of which 31.1% had children under the age of 18 living with them, 46.2% were married couples living together, 24.6% had a female householder with no husband present, and 24.1% were non-families. 22.4% of all households were made up of individuals, and 12.2% had someone living alone who was 65 years of age or older. The average household size was 2.81 and the average family size was 3.28.

In the town, the population was spread out, with 27.6% under the age of 18, 10.8% from 18 to 24, 24.8% from 25 to 44, 21.9% from 45 to 64, and 14.9% who were 65 years of age or older. The median age was 34 years. For every 100 females, there were 86.0 males. For every 100 females age 18 and over, there were 82.3 males.

The median income for a household in the town was $27,500, and the median income for a family was $31,912. Males had a median income of $26,429 versus $19,000 for females. The per capita income for the town was $12,050. About 26.6% of families and 34.0% of the population were below the poverty line, including 39.8% of those under age 18 and 39.3% of those age 65 or over.

== Education ==
=== Primary and secondary schools ===
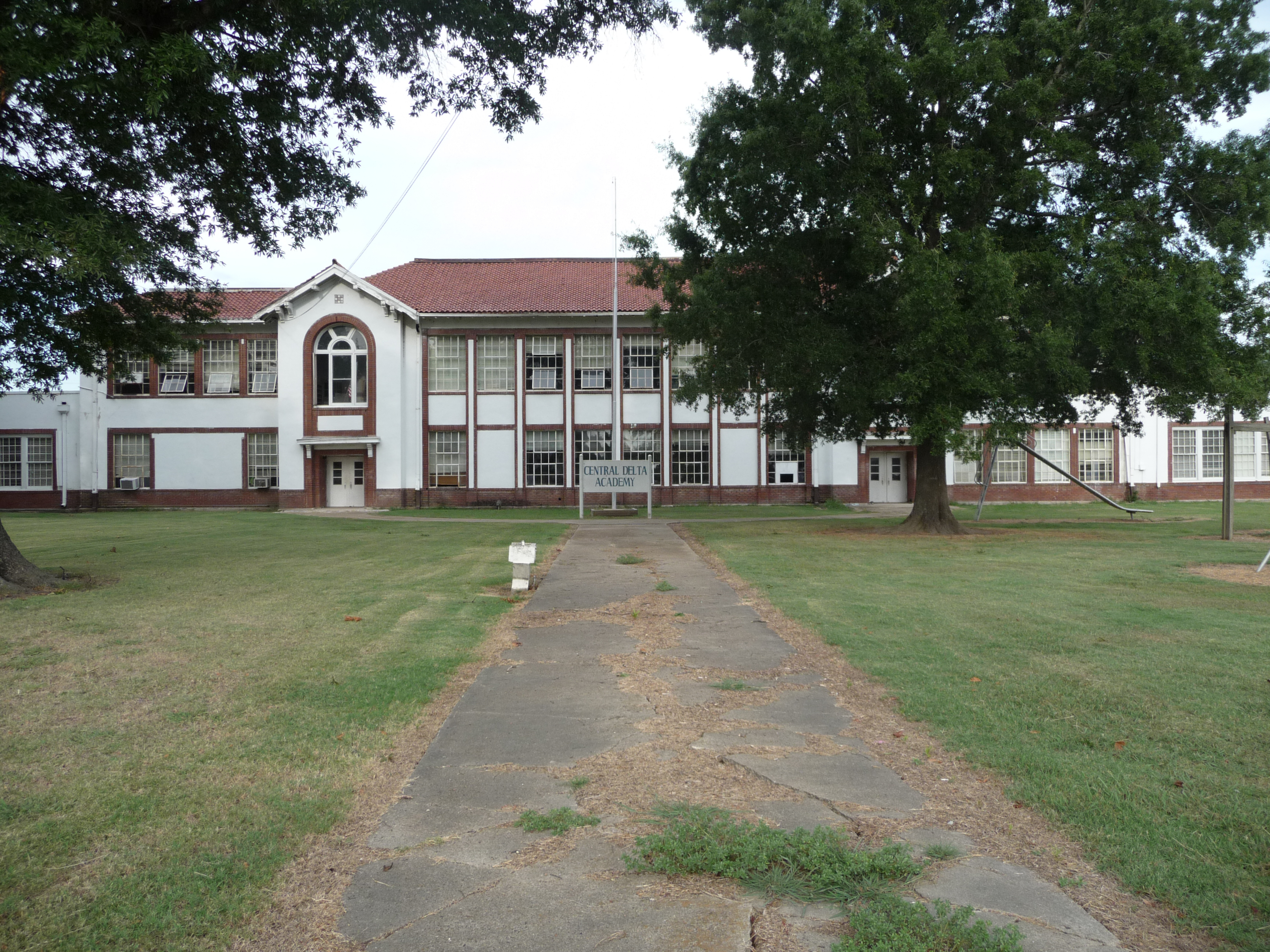
Central Delta Academy, prior to 2010, when it closed.

The Town of Inverness is served by the Sunflower County Consolidated School District (formerly Sunflower County School District). Residents are zoned to school in Moorhead, Mississippi. As of 2012 it was zoned to Ruleville Central High School (now Thomas E. Edwards, Sr. High School), at the time the sole school of the district.

After desegregation began in Inverness in the mid-20th century, white parents withdrew their children from the white public school, which closed. The white high school students began attending a private school in Indianola. Formerly Inverness School (K-8) is the sole public school in Inverness. Inverness School closed in 2022, with students redirected to Moorhead.

Central Delta Academy was constructed in Inverness as a segregation academy, a private school for white students whose parents did not want them in the public school system, which was under federal rulings to desegregate. It closed on May 21, 2010. The building was auctioned off in 2011, and was bulldozed soon thereafter.

=== Colleges and universities ===
Delta State University, a public research university, and Mississippi Valley State University, a historically black college, are in the area.

=== Public libraries ===
The Sunflower County Library operates the Inverness Public Library. It was previously in a "Community House". In 1962 its location changed to that of a facility that was formerly a grocery store. By 2012 it was in Inverness City Hall.

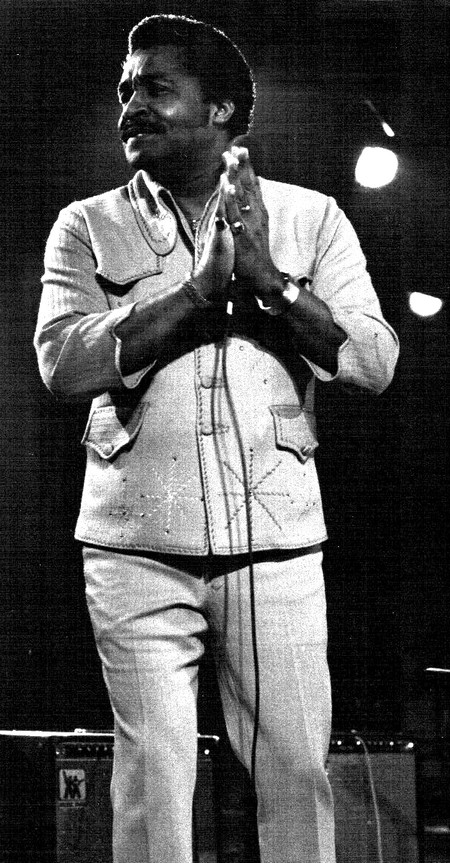
Little Milton

== Notable people ==
- Mary E. Flowers, member of the Illinois House of Representatives
- Boyd Gilmore, Delta blues musician
- Anne Lester Hudson, mathematician
- Fred Jones, former member of the Mississippi House of Representatives and the Mississippi Senate
- Samuel Jones, composer and Mississippi Musicians Hall of Fame inductee
- Willie Kent, blues musician
- Little Milton, blues musician and Mississippi Musicians Hall of Fame member
- Will Green Poindexter, member of the Mississippi House of Representatives from 1976 to 1993
- Virgil Robinson, former National Football League running back
- Ernie Terrell, boxer
- Norris Thomas, professional American football player
