= Indianola Academy =

Segregation academy in Mississippi

The Indianola Academy

Location
- 549 Dorsett Drive; Indianola, Mississippi; United States; 33°27′31″N 90°38′6″W

Information
- Type: Private School (Non-Sectarian)
- Motto: Integrity and Achievement
- Established: 1965
- Status: Active
- Headmaster: Charlie Mason
- Grades: pre-kindergarten - 12
- Enrollment: 500 (approximately)
- Colors: Blue, White, and Black
- Athletics: High school and junior high Football, Baseball, Basketball, Soccer, Softball, Swim team, track and field, golf, tennis,
- Mascot: The Running Colonel
- Affiliation: Mississippi Association of Independent Schools
- Website: http://indianolaacademy.org/

The Indianola Academy is a K-12 private school in Indianola, Mississippi founded as a segregation academy. Indianola Academy comprises an elementary school, a middle school, and a college preparatory high school. Indianola Academy is a 501(c)(3) nonprofit institution. As of 2012 most white teenagers in Indianola attend Indianola Academy instead of the public high schools.

== History ==
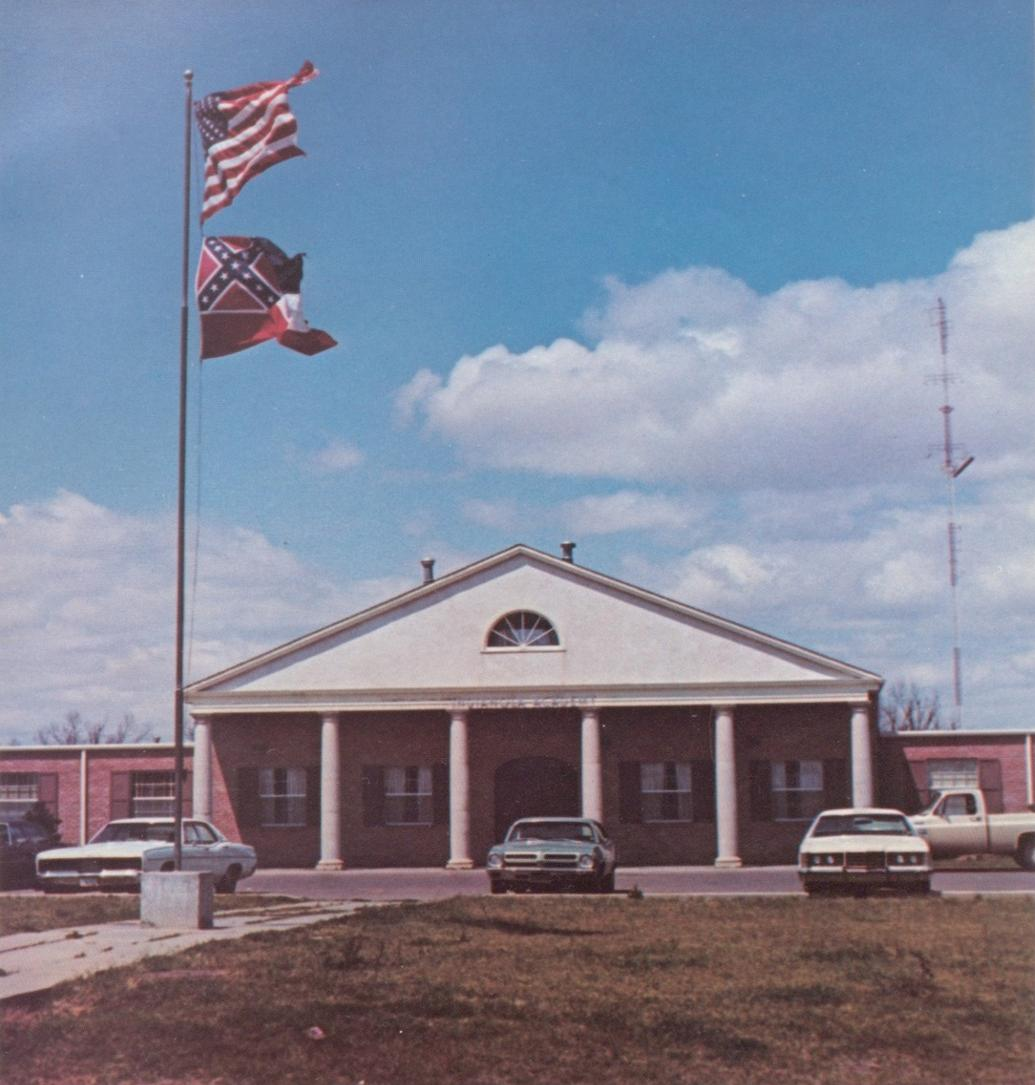
Indianola Academy in 1974

=== Racial segregation ===
In the post Brown v. Board of Education era, white Americans in the Indianola area planned to establish a segregation academy. Planning for the school began in 1964 with funding from the White Citizens Council. Classes started in 1965 with four sections in grades 1 and 2, with a total of 70 students. For the 1966-1967 and the 1967-1968 school years, classes were held at the First Baptist Church. In the fall of 1967 the school had nine grades, with a total of 241 students. The school conducted the 1968-1969 school year in a new building. During that year it served grades 1-10 and had 280 students.

In April 1969 the United States Court of Appeals for the Fifth Circuit ruled that the desegregation plan adopted by the Indianola Municipal Separate School District was constitutionally defective. Isabel Lee, then the sole African-American on the Indianola School District board, recalled that no white students showed up at Gentry High School on the following Monday. Once the U.S. v. Indianola Municipal School District court case ruling occurred on a Friday, the white townspeople almost immediately prepared to send their children to Indianola Academy, with classes beginning on a Monday. The school was not directly operated by a white citizens' council. J. Todd Moye, author of Let the People Decide, said that the school's "link to council ideology was direct." Moye said "Indianola Academy's relatively quick organization and construction could only have been the result of massive organization on the part of white segregationists."

Most of the white students enrolled at the Indianola Academy for the 1970 Winter semester, which caused the Academy's enrollment to grow "exponentially overnight." Because the school did not yet have a single facility which could hold all of the White students, it opened satellite campuses to hold extra students. One was held at a Baptist church. Funerals held on weekdays sometimes interrupted the study halls at the church campus. The curriculum was mostly college preparatory, but "some adjustments were made to accommodate students who aren't going to college."

At the beginning of the 1969-1970 school year the school had about 600 students in grades 1-12. The school accepted about 900 students after the end of the first semester, giving the school a total of 1,500 students. In the 1970-1971 school year the elementary classes continued to be held at the area Baptist and Methodist churches, while the students in grades 7-12 moved to the Educational Plant at U.S. Highway 82 East.

In 1970, about 200 white students left Indianola academy, but did not enroll in racially integrated public schools.

In 1983, the school enrolled its first black student. In the same year, the school established a scholarship program for minority students. An NAACP representative claimed that the school had paid the family of the black student to enroll to avoid losing its tax exempt status.

In 1990 the school system in Indianola was still essentially segregated, with most African-American students attending public schools and most white students attending the Indianola Academy.

=== Drug testing ===
In 1989 the Indianola Academy made national news with a plan to make drug testing mandatory for all students and employees of the school. Under the plan adopted by the school a positive result would mean a mandatory retest after 100 days. Further positive results would require notification of parents and exclusion of students from extracurricular activities. Students who refuse to take the test would be dismissed.

Although the United States Supreme Court has ruled that mandatory testing of teachers and administrators in public schools is a violation of the Fourth Amendment to the United States Constitution, schools such as the Indianola Academy are exempt from scrutiny because they are privately run. At the time the plan was adopted it was most stringent school drug testing program in the United States. Joyce McCray, executive director of the Council for American Private Education, said of the plan that she had "never heard of anything like it. It's an unusual and unique program. It's also a little bewildering and sad. That doesn't sound like education."

== Administration ==
As of 2012 the headmaster, high school principal, and elementary principal are Sammy Henderson, Charles D. Mason, and Katherine B. Gibbs, respectively.

== Accreditation ==
Indianola Academy is accredited by the Southern Association of Colleges and Schools, the Mississippi Association of Independent Schools, and the Southern Association of Independent Schools.

== Demographics ==
For the 2009-2010 school year, according to the Private School Universe Survey, the school had 434 white students and 2 black students. Sammy Henderson, the headmaster, said in 2012 that for the 2012-2013 school year the school had 9 black students and that "we also have Hispanic, Indian, and Oriental students." As of 2012, of the approximately 10,000 residents of Indianola, Mississippi, fewer than twenty percent of them were white.

== Admissions ==
According to the student handbook, a prospective student should be among the top 30% of the takers of a student achievement test in order to gain admission to the school. A participant of the Sunflower County Freedom Project who had a younger brother who considered applying to the school stated in an article in The Atlantic that, as paraphrased by article author Sarah Carr, "Applicants have to be top students and submit multiple letters of recommendation".

== Tuition and scholarships ==
As of 2012 tuition ranges from $3,795 to $5,080 per year depending on the grade level. This includes money for books and other fees. Sammy Henderson, the headmaster, said that the school has annual budgets for minority scholarship and uses word-of-mouth and newspaper advertisements to spread awareness of these scholarships. He explained that a "minority scholarship committee" reviews applications to get into the school and awards money to prospective students who "meet the qualifications". Sarah Carr of The Atlantic said that Henderson did not specify what the qualifications are. Internal Revenue Service (IRS) records state that in 2012 the school budgeted $6,500 for "minority scholarships". Carr said that IA has, as shown by the IRS forms, "raised a modest amount for scholarships in recent years".

Carr said "Tradition and history partly explain why the scholarships aren't more widely utilized: Black families know their children could be isolated and shunned at the academy, and those with the means and desire to avoid the public schools have long relied on other -- more historically welcoming -- private schools, including a tiny, nearly all-black Christian academy in Indianola." Restoration Ministries Christian Academy is the other private school in Indianola.

Sam Wallis, who was a teacher at Gentry High School in 2012, and Katie Cooney, who was a former Gentry teacher that year, said that, as paraphrased by Carr, "some black students appear to be recruited at least partly because of their athletic abilities". Henderson said that this was not true and that several black students at IA do not play sports.

== Academics ==
Students at the school, unlike students at public schools, are not required to take Mississippi state standardized tests.

== Interactions with government agencies ==
In a two-year period ending in 2012, according to officials of the Indianola School District, IA received $56,000 in Title II professional development funds. Sarah Carr of The Atlantic said that Indianola residents told her that "apart from that exchange of money, there's little formal or informal interaction between the academy and the public school system".

== Athletics ==
In the Mississippi Delta typically private academies play other private academies in interscholastic sports. Indianola Academy does not play Gentry High School, the public high school in Indianola.

Throughout most of its history the school held control of an American football field adjacent to the former public junior high school, which now contains the public early childhood center. The academy places its "IA" logo on the buildings of the field and it has a 6-foot (1.8 m) barbed wire fence around the perimeter of the field. It does not share the facility with other agencies. Sarah Carr of The Atlantic said that the fence is "a stark reminder that outsiders should stay away" and that the logos are "like territorial markings." Leaders in the City of Indianola said that the American Legion owns the land. Carr said that IA maintains control of the field "for reasons that remain the subject of urban legend in town".

== Alumni ==
- Steve Yarbrough - Novelist

== See also ==
- Segregation academies
- White Citizens' Council
