= Anne Lester Hudson =

American mathematician

Anne Lester Hudson (January 30, 1932 - January 02, 2025) was an American mathematician and mathematics educator. Her research specialty was the theory of topological semigroups; she was also known for her skill at mathematical problem-solving, and has coached students to success in both the International Mathematical Olympiad and the William Lowell Putnam Mathematical Competition. She is a professor emeritus at the Georgia Southern University-Armstrong Campus (formerly Armstrong State College).

== Education ==
Born as Anne Lester, Hudson was originally from Mississippi, and grew up in Inverness, Mississippi, a town so small that there were only seven students in her high school class. She did her undergraduate studies at Hollins College, with Herta Freitag as a mentor. Unusually for the time, she continued at Hollins for four years, instead of transferring after two years to another university, in order to continue working with Freitag. She graduated in 1953.

In 1961, she earned her Ph.D. in mathematics from Tulane University, where she also met her husband, mathematician Sigmund Hudson. Her dissertation, On the Structure of Certain Classes of Topological Semigroups, was supervised by Paul Stallings Mostert. She became the first woman to earn a doctorate in mathematics at Tulane.

== Career ==
After postdoctoral studies funded by the National Science Foundation and NATO, Hudson became a faculty member at Syracuse University, and earned tenure there in 1966 for her research. In 1971 she moved to Armstrong State College in Georgia, "to an environment more heavily involved in undergraduate teaching".

In 1994 Hudson directed the United States Math Olympiad Program, a training program for the U.S. team in the International Mathematical Olympiad. She went to Hong Kong, where the Olympiad was held, as the coach for the team, and led the team to win the Olympiad.

== Recognition ==
In 1993, when the Mathematical Association of America began giving out its Deborah and Franklin Haimo Awards for Distinguished College or University Teaching of Mathematics, Hudson was one of the first winners. The Carnegie Foundation for the Advancement of Teaching named her as one of their 1996 Outstanding Professors of the Year. She was given a special commendation by the Georgia House of Representatives in 1997. Hollins College has also given her their outstanding alumna award.
