= Mildred Wolfe =

American artist (1912–2009)

- Self-portrait
- Born: Mildred Nungester; August 23, 1912; Celina, Ohio, U.S.
- Died: February 11, 2009 (aged 96); Jackson, Mississippi, U.S.
- Known for: Painting
- Spouse: Karl Wolfe (m. 1944; died 1984)
- Children: 2

Mildred Nungester Wolfe (August 23, 1912 – February 11, 2009) was an American artist based out of Jackson, Mississippi.

== Biography ==
She was born on August 23, 1912, in Celina, Ohio, and grew up in Decatur, Alabama. Her father was a pharmacist. In 1932, she graduated from Alabama College in Montevallo.

=== Career ===
During the Great Depression, her art career was temporarily placed on hold, as she taught Latin and English in Alabama for a decade. She did make trips to study at the Chicago Art Institute and the Art Students League of New York. During a summer trip to Kelly Fitzpatrick's Dixie Art Colony in 1937, she met her future husband, Karl Wolfe. They married in Colorado in 1944, where she was studying for a master of fine arts at Colorado College and he was working for the Air Force as a graphic artist at Lowry Field.

After World War II, the Wolfes settled in Jackson, constructing Wolfe Studio and becoming regionalist artists interested in depicting Mississippi. Inspired by European Masters, Impressionists, and Post-Impressionists, she mostly painted landscapes in oil or watercolor. While Karl Wolfe was most known for his portraits, Mildred also painted several well-known portraits, including one of close friend Eudora Welty that is in the National Portrait Gallery. In addition to painting, both Wolfes worked with ceramics, sculpture, and stained glass. Mildred worked in her husband's shadow for many years, first at Wolfe Studios, then at Millsaps College, where both were members of the art department. When her husband retired in 1968, she lost her teaching position. In 1978, while Karl was included in an exhibition of Mississippi art, she was not.

After Karl's death in 1984, the art community of Mississippi began appreciating Mildred for her own art, not for being Karl's wife. The Mississippi Museum of Art mounted exhibitions of her work in 1994 and 2006. In addition, the University Press of Mississippi published a monograph of Mildred's work, showing examples of her paintings and public works.

=== Death ===
She died of congestive heart failure at her Jackson home on February 11, 2009, aged 96.
