= Charles M. Deaton =

American politician (1931–2007)

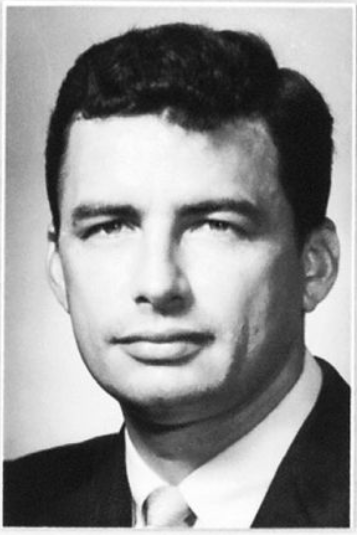
- Deaton, c. 1960

Member of the Mississippi House of Representatives from the multiple district 17th (1972–1980) 15th (1968–1972) Leflore County (1960–1968)
- In office January 1960 – January 1980 Serving with 1972–1980: Robert G. Huggins, Clarence A. Pierce Jr. 1968–1972: Estes C. McDaniel, O. B. Bennett, Clyde E. Wood, Hugh M. Arant; 1964–1968: Estes C. McDaniel
- Preceded by: C. L. Partridge
- Succeeded by: Thomas L. Brooks (redistricting)

Personal details
- Born: January 19, 1931 Hattiesburg, Mississippi
- Died: June 6, 2007 (aged 76) Greenwood, Mississippi
- Party: Democratic

Charles M. Deaton (January 19, 1931 – June 6, 2007) was an American politician from Leflore County, Mississippi. He was a member of the Mississippi House of Representatives from 1960 to 1980, and a gubernatorial candidate in 1980.

== Biography ==
Charles M. Deaton was born on January 19, 1931, in Hattiesburg, Mississippi. He was the son of Ivanes Dean Deaton and Martha Fortenberry Deaton. Deaton graduated from Greenwood High School, Millsaps College (from which he received a B. A.), George Washington University, and finally the University of Mississippi School of Law, from which he received a J. D. Deaton served for four years in the United States Navy during the Korean War. He began practicing law, in Greenwood, Mississippi, in 1958.

== Political career ==
=== 1960–1980 ===
After being elected in 1959, Deaton represented Leflore County in the Mississippi House of Representatives for the 1960–1964 term. He was re-elected in 1963 and served in the 1964–1968 term. In 1967, Deaton was re-elected and represented the 15th District (composed of Leflore and Sunflower Counties) in the House from 1968 to 1972. In 1970, he became the city attorney of Greenwood, Mississippi; he would hold this position until 1984. Deaton was re-elected to the House in 1971 and represented the 17th District (Carroll and Leflore Counties) in the House from 1972 to 1976. He was re-elected for the same district for the 1976–1980 term. During this term, Deaton was the chairman of the House's Appropriation Committee.

=== 1980–2007 ===
In 1980, Deaton ran for the office of governor of Mississippi. However, he did not win the Democratic primary. Deaton then served on the staff as a member of the Mississippi Board of Economic Development and a senior aide of Mississippi Governors William Winter (1980–1984) and William Allain (1984–1988). In this office in 1982, he helped formulate and pass the Mississippi Education Reform Act. From 1985 to 1987, Deaton was the President of the Leflore County Bar Association. He was the chairman of the Mississippi State Board of Education from 1987 to 2004.

== Personal life and death ==
Deaton was married to the former Mary Dent Dickerson. They had two daughters and a son. Deaton died on June 6, 2007, in the Greenwood Leflore Hospital.
