= William Richardson (Mississippi politician) =

American politician and teacher

William "Bill" Richardson (December 26, 1951 – March 25, 1997) was a teacher and politician from Indianola, Mississippi who served in the Mississippi House of Representatives from 1993 until his death in 1997.

== Background and early career ==
Born December 26, 1951 in Indianola, Richardson was educated in schools of the Indianola School District. He received a bachelor's degree from Mississippi Valley State University, and pursued graduate studies there and at the University of Southern Mississippi. He taught social studies and civics in the Indianola School District for almost 20 years. He was active in various civic organizations, including the National Education Association and the National Association for the Advancement of Colored People.

== Legislative career ==
In 1992, he was elected to the 31st district of the Mississippi State House of Representatives as a Democrat. He served on the Committee on Education, the Committee on Agriculture and the Joint Legislative Parole Commission; and during the legislature's 1995 session was elected sergeant-at-arms of the Mississippi Legislative Black Caucus. He died of cancer in 1997, and was succeeded in the House by his aunt, Sara Thomas.
