= Sara Thomas =

American educator and politician

Sara Richardson Thomas
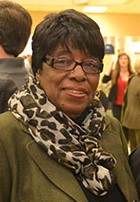

Member of the Mississippi House of Representatives from the 31st district
- In office 1999–2019
- Preceded by: Bill Richardson
- Succeeded by: Otis Anthony II

Personal details
- Born: April 21, 1941 (age 85) Indianola, Mississippi, U.S.
- Party: Democratic

Sara Richardson Thomas (born April 21, 1941) is an American educator and politician from Indianola, Mississippi. She was a member of the Mississippi House of Representatives from the 31st District, having first been elected in 1998 to succeed her nephew, Bill Richardson, who had died in office, and having retired in June 2018. She is a member of the Democratic Party.

== Background ==
Thomas, the daughter of sharecroppers, attended Mississippi Valley State University and Delta State University. She taught language arts in the public elementary schools of Sunflower County, Mississippi for 21 years before becoming a principal. She is married to Arthur Lee Thomas.

== Legislative service ==
In 1997, her nephew Bill Richardson, who represented the 31st district, died of cancer. Thomas was elected to fill the vacancy in 1998, and would serve in that office for 21 years. In late June 2018, it was announced that she had resigned, effective from June 30. At that time, she was serving on the House committees on Agriculture, Education, Ethics, Investigating State Offices, Public Property and Youth and Family Affairs.
