= Fred Jones (Mississippi politician) =

Mississippi legislator and prison warden

Fred Jones (died 1969) was a cotton planter, state legislator, and prison warden in Mississippi. He lived in Inverness, Mississippi. A Democrat, he was state senator from 1944 to 1960 then member of the House of Representatives from 1962 to 1966 representing Sunflower County. He served on the Executive Committee of Citizens Council. He was a prison reformer.

== See also ==
- Citizens Council
- List of former members of the Mississippi State Senate
