= O. B. Bennett =

American politician (1925 - 2000)

Member of the Mississippi House of Representatives from the 13th district 15th (1968–1972)
- In office January 1968 – January 1976 Serving with 1972–1976: Clyde E. Wood; 1968–1972: Charles M. Deaton, Estes C. McDaniel, Clyde E. Wood, Hugh M. Arant
- Succeeded by: Will Green Poindexter

Personal details
- Born: June 22, 1925 French Camp, Mississippi
- Died: March 3, 2000 (aged 74) Kosciusko, Mississippi

Otis Bee Bennett (June 22, 1925 – March 3, 2000) was an American politician and farmer. He was a member of the Mississippi House of Representatives from 1968 to 1976.

== Biography ==
Otis Bee Bennett was born on June 22, 1925, in French Camp, Mississippi. He was the son of Mr. and Mrs. J. A. Bennett. He moved to Sunflower County, Mississippi, in 1927. He graduated from Sunflower Agricultural High School, Sunflower Junior College, and Mississippi State University. He served in the U. S. Air Force in World War II. Bennett, a farmer in Sunflower County, was elected to represent the 15th district in the Mississippi House of Representatives for the 1968-1972 term. He was then re-elected to represent the 13th district in the 1972-1976 term. Bennett died of heart failure at the Mississippi State Veterans Nursing Home in Kosciusko, Mississippi, on March 3, 2000.
