= Indianola School District =

Former school district in Mississippi, US

The Indianola School District is a former public school district based in Indianola, Mississippi (USA). In July 2014, it was merged into the Sunflower County Consolidated School District.

== History ==
Isabel Lee was the school district's first African-American board member.

After the U.S. v. Indianola Municipal School District court case ruled in favor of the federal government on a Friday, the White townspeople almost immediately established Indianola Academy, with classes beginning on a Monday. Plans to establish a segregation academy had been in the running prior to the court case. Isabel Lee, then the sole African-American on the board, recalled that no White students showed up at Gentry High School on that Monday. By 1985, over 90% of the pupils and most of the teachers in the school district were African-American.

In 2009 the State of Mississippi took over the school district because it had insufficient funds, and was therefore unable to meet payroll. In February 2012 the Mississippi Senate voted 43-4 to pass Senate Bill 2330, to consolidate the Indianola School District, the Drew School District, and the Sunflower County School District into one school district. The bill went to the Mississippi House of Representatives. In May 2012 Governor of Mississippi Phil Bryant signed the bill into law, requiring all three districts to consolidate. SB2330 stipulates that if a county has three school districts all under conservatorship by the Mississippi Department of Education will have them consolidated into one school district serving the entire county. For the 2012-2013 school year Indianola School District remained a separate school district.

In July 2014, the Indianola School District was merged into the Sunflower County Consolidated School District.

== Schools ==
Zoned secondary schools:

- Gentry High School (10-12)
- Robert L. Merritt Junior High School (7-9)

Zoned primary schools:

- Carver Elementary School (3-6)
- Lockard Elementary School (K-2)

Indianola Career and Technical Center and Indianola Academic Achievement Academy, 10-12 schools, were also a part of the district.

In the mid-2000s the schools (aside from Gentry) were Lockard Elementary School, Carver Lower Elementary School, Carver Upper Elementary School, Robert L. Merritt Middle School, and Pennington Jr. High School.

== Demographics ==
As of 1996 9 of 10 students in the Indianola School District were African-American. Most of the White students who attend Indianola public schools transfer to private schools by junior high school. In 2012 Sarah Carr of The Atlantic said "While there's some modest racial integration at Indianola's public elementary schools, by high school all but a few white students have departed."

=== 2006-07 school year ===
There were a total of 2,589 students enrolled in the Indianola School District during the 2006-2007 school year. The gender makeup of the district was 49% female and 51% male. The racial makeup of the district was 95.21% African American, 3.59% White, 0.97% Hispanic, 0.23% Asian. 84.8% of the district's students were eligible to receive free lunch.

=== Previous school years ===
School Year	Enrollment	Gender Makeup		Racial Makeup				
School Year	Enrollment	Female	Male	Asian	African American	Hispanic	Native American	White
2005-06	2,665	48%	52%	0.26%	95.05%	0.98%	–	3.71%
2004-05	2,712	47%	53%	0.22%	94.40%	1.03%	–	4.35%
2003-04	2,815	48%	52%	0.18%	93.61%	0.89%	–	5.33%
2002-03	2,793	49%	51%	0.25%	94.20%	0.72%	–	4.83%

== Accountability statistics ==
	2006-07	2005-06	2004-05	2003-04	2002-03
District Accreditation Status	Accredited	Accredited	Accredited	Accredited	Accredited
School Performance Classifications
Level 5 (Superior Performing) Schools	0	1	0	0	0
Level 4 (Exemplary) Schools	0	0	1	0	0
Level 3 (Successful) Schools	2	2	1	2	0
Level 2 (Under Performing) Schools	3	2	2	3	4
Level 1 (Low Performing) Schools	0	0	1	0	0
Not Assigned	1	1	1	1	2

== See also ==
- List of school districts in Mississippi
