= Heathman, Mississippi =

- Unincorporated community
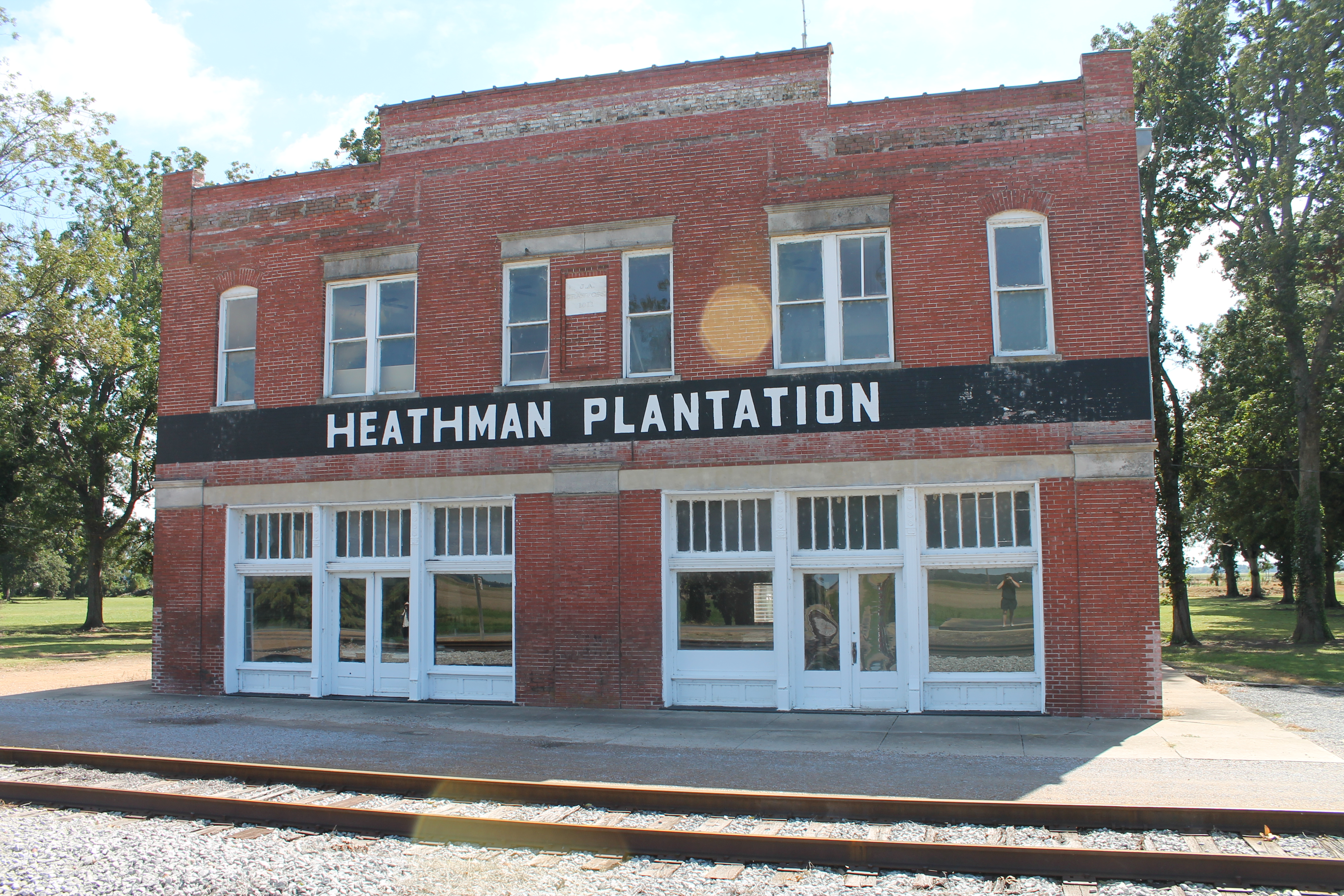
- The Heathman Plantation Commissary is listed on the National Register of Historic Places

- Location within Mississippi Location within the United States
- Coordinates: 33°26′24″N 90°43′13″W
- Country: United States
- State: Mississippi
- County: Sunflower
- Elevation: 125 ft (38 m)
- Time zone: UTC-6 (Central (CST))
  - Summer (DST): UTC-5 (CDT)
- ZIP code: 38751
- Area code: 662
- GNIS feature ID: 671056

Heathman is an unincorporated community in Sunflower County, Mississippi, United States. Heathman is located within the Mississippi Delta near U.S. Route 82 on Heathman Road, approximately 2 miles (3.2 km) west of Indianola and 2 miles (3.2 km) east of Holly Ridge.

The Columbus and Greenville Railway passes through Heathman.

== History ==
In 1900, Heathman had a money-order post office and a population of 35.

The Heathman Plantation is located within the settlement.

== Notable people ==
Heathman is the birthplace of George Washington Lee, known as "Lieutenant Lee of Beale Street", an author and civic leader in Memphis, Tennessee.
