= Shooting of Aderrien Murry =

2023 shooting in Indianola, Mississippi, US

Aderrien Murry, an unarmed 11-year-old African American boy, was shot in the chest in Indianola, Mississippi, by an Indianola Police Department officer on May 20, 2023, after police responded to Murry's 9-1-1 call for help at his home. Murry survived the shooting with a collapsed lung, a lacerated liver, and fractured ribs. The involved officer was suspended, but later reinstated after a grand jury in December 2023 decided not to charge the officer with a crime.

== Statements by Murry and representatives ==
Murry's mother stated that during the incident at 4 a.m., a man, who had fathered another child with her, came to her home in a very angry mood, so she directed Murry to call the police. One officer arrived at the front door of her home with his gun drawn, calling for people inside the home to come out of the home. The officer shot Murry when Murry was coming from around the corner of a hallway to enter the living room. Murry's mother also said that the officer who shot Murry later helped her render aid to Murry until medics came to the scene. The Murry family's lawyer said that Murry was unarmed at the time of the shooting. Murry said that he prayed and sang in order to survive.

The Murry family's lawyer said that the officer "could not have been confused" between Murry and the man Murry contacted the police about since Murry's height was about 4 feet 10 inches (1.47 m), and the man is over 6 feet (1.8 m) tall. Murry's family have called for police body camera footage to be released, and also called for the officer to be terminated from his position and charged with aggravated assault.

== Official response ==
The Mississippi Bureau of Investigation, which is investigating the shooting, stated that officers were responding to a domestic disturbance call. The officer involved was initially placed on paid administrative leave following the shooting while the incident was under investigation, but later city officials suspended him without pay on June 15. The officer's attorney has stated that the shooting was "unintentional".

A Sunflower County grand jury in December 2023 declined to file criminal charges against the involved officer for shooting Murry, indicated the Mississippi Attorney General's office. Later that month, the involved officer was reinstated back into the force. In January 2024, the Mississippi government published a video of the shooting taken by a body camera.

Media outlets reported in April 2024 that Sunflower Prosecutor Gwendolyn Jimison sought to revoke custody of Aderrien Murry and his siblings from his mother, citing an unnamed witness saying that the shooting of Aderrien was the "result of the mother and boyfriend domestic violence that have been happening for years".

== Lawsuit ==
Within two weeks of the shooting, Murry and his mother initiated a lawsuit in federal court against the officer, the city of Indianola, its police chief, and five unnamed police officers; the lawsuit alleged "negligence and excessive force" and requested $5 million in compensation. The Indianola mayor has responded that Indianola "doesn't have $5 million in the bank".

The federal lawsuit was dismissed in July 2024 by Judge Debra Brown due to the lawsuit failing to utilize the Mississippi Tort Claims Act to argue a constitutional violation, but Murry was allowed to change the terms of the lawsuit.
