= George Washington Lee =

African American civic and political leader from Memphis (1894–1976)

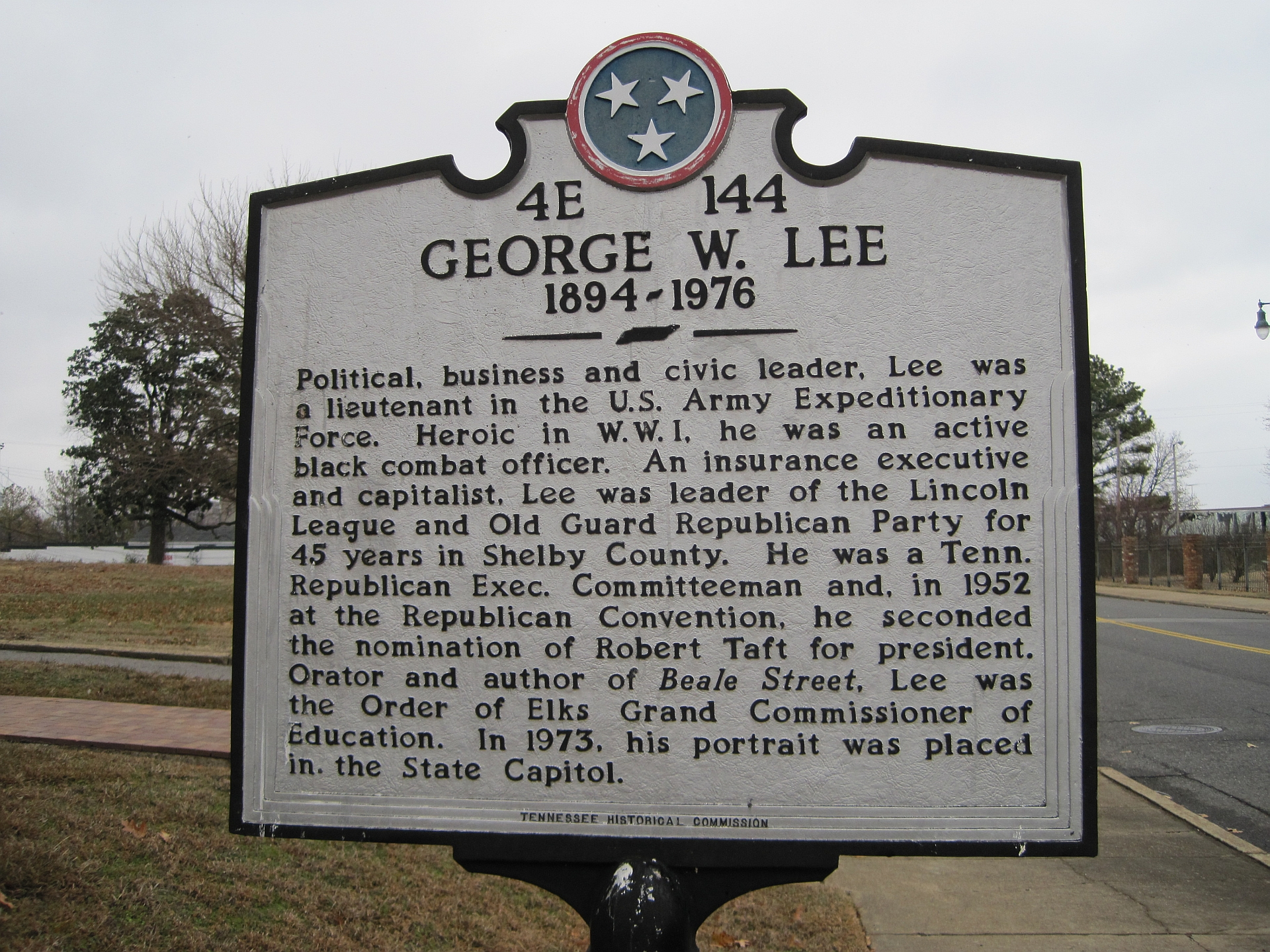
- Born: January 4, 1894; Heathman, Mississippi, U.S.
- Died: August 1, 1976 (aged 82); Memphis, Tennessee, U.S.
- Other name: "Lieutenant Lee of Beale Street"
- Known for: Soldier, author, political leader and corporate executive
- Political party: Republican

George Washington Lee (January 4, 1894 – August 1, 1976) was an African-American soldier, writer, political leader and corporate executive. Born in Heathman, Mississippi in 1894, Lee spent most of his life in Memphis, Tennessee. Lee received numerous citations for his benevolence and civic initiatives.

== Life and career ==
Lee's parents, the Reverend George and Hattie Stringfellow, separated before his birth, and George and his brother Abner were raised by their mother, who worked as a sharecropper. Hattie Lee soon moved the family to nearby Indianola, Mississippi, a more populated and prosperous community. As a boy, Lee obtained summer employment at a grocery store in Indianola, but was subsequently fired by the white owner who was pressured by white patrons to hire white staff.

Lee entered Alcorn Agricultural and Mechanical College in Lorman, Mississippi, where he was recognized for his academic achievement.

In the summer of 1912, Lee moved to Memphis, Tennessee, where he found work as a bellhop at the Gayoso Hotel. When the hotel's manager died in 1916, Lee demonstrated his skill at writing and composed a eulogy to his former boss which was published in a Memphis newspaper.

At the outbreak of World War I, Lee was determined to enter the Fort Des Moines Provisional Army Officer Training School in Iowa. In the qualifying examinations, Lee excelled in both physical skill and intelligence, and at the age of 23 was selected to attend the camp. Lieutenant Lee's 920th Division proved their bravery while stationed in France, and Lee himself was awarded a French Croix de guerre medal for bravery. His Division none-the-less received racist insults and innuendos from white soldiers.

Lieutenant Lee received an honorable discharge in 1919, and returned to Memphis, where he soon found employment as a salesman with the black-owned Mississippi Life Insurance Company. Within weeks he was promoted to manager, and then to vice-president in 1920. When white-owned Southern Life Insurance Company purchased Mississippi Life in 1923, the new owners requested Lee continue to work for them collecting premiums from the black clients, and offered Lee $7,000 per year and two percent of each premium. Lee refused, asserting that he did not want to enable the takeover of a black-owned business. Lee went on to join the Atlanta Life Insurance Company, where he became a senior vice-president, and continued to work until his death in a car wreck on August 1, 1976, at the age of 82.

== Political activity ==
George Lee was active in the Republican Party, and in the 1928 presidential election served as national director of "Veterans for Hoover". In 1952, Lee delivered one of the speeches at the Republican National Convention in Chicago, where he seconded the nomination of Senator Robert Taft. In the 1956 presidential election, Lee is credited with delivering Tennessee to Eisenhower.

== Author ==
In 1934, Lee authored Beale Street: Where the Blues Began; the first book by a black author advertised in the Book-of-the-Month Club News. Lee's second novel, River George, was published in 1937. Lee's stories were published in The Negro Digest, The World's Digest, and Southern Literary Messenger, and in 1942, an anthology of his short stories entitled Beale Street Sundown was published.

== Civic involvement and recognition ==
In 1951, The Chicago Defender named Lee one of 10 "Most Useful Men" for his efforts at voter registration in Memphis.

Lee became Grand Commissioner of Education and the Civil Rights Department of the National Elks and for the Memphis chapter of the Benevolent and Protective Order of Elks in 1952.

In 1956, Lee was the first African American to have a US post office named after him, in Memphis.

As Memphis black leaders became more radical throughout the 1940s and 1950s, Lee became increasingly more conservative. He opposed the violence of the Rap Brown "Black Power" movement, and during the 1960s he traveled around the country criticizing black power movements towards violence. He believed black people should appeal to the white sense of conscience to guilt rather than simply demand their own rights through violence.

A number of George Lee's speeches have been inserted into the Congressional Record, and in 1973, Lee's portrait was hung in the Rotunda of the Tennessee State Capitol.

In 2006, construction began on "Lee's Landing Retail, Entertainment and Parking", in the Beale Street district of Memphis. A street in the area is also named in Lee's honor.
