= Beulah Bettersworth =

American artist (1894–1968)

- Born: Beulah Ruth; August 22, 1894; St. Louis, Missouri, U.S.
- Died: August 3, 1968 (aged 73); Tucson, Arizona, U.S.
- Occupations: Artist, muralist
- Years active: 1925-c.1953

Beulah Ruth Bettersworth (1894–1968) was an artist and muralist in the early 20th century. She was most known for her still lifes and street scenes. Her painting Christopher Street, Greenwich Village was selected for the White House by President Franklin Roosevelt and is now in the permanent collection of the Smithsonian American Art Museum. She won national competitions to complete post office murals for the post offices in Indianola and Columbus, Mississippi.

== Biography ==
Beulah Ruth was born on August 22, 1894, in St. Louis, Missouri to Junius B. and Ella Ruth. She studied at the Art Students League of New York with George Bellows and John Sloan and later studied under John Carroll, Frank V. DuMond and Charles Hawthorne. On April 18, 1917, in Manhattan, New York, Ruth married the illustrator Howard Bettersworth.

== Career ==
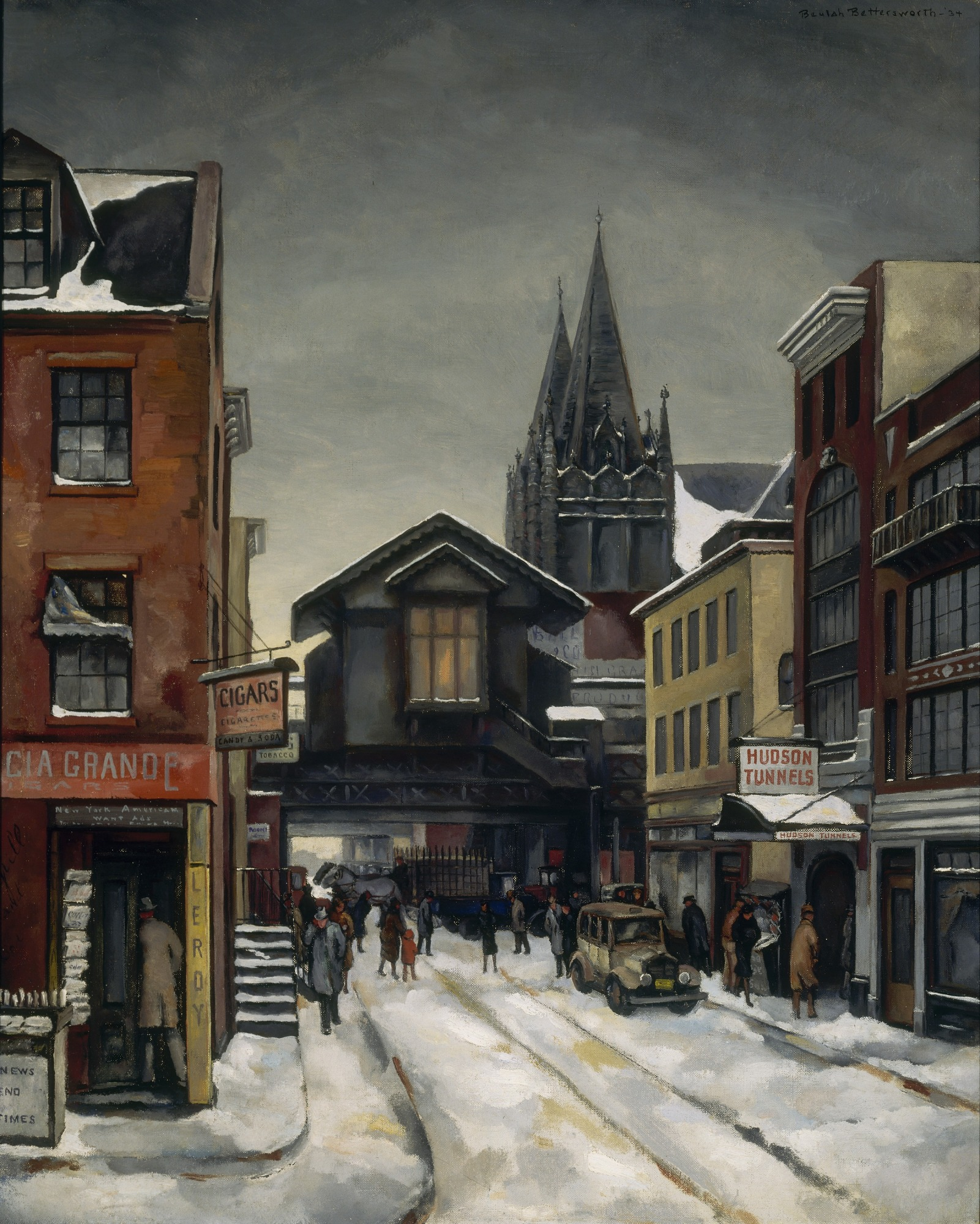
Christopher Street, Greenwich Village (1934)

Not much has been written of her early career, but it is known that Bettersworth did some artwork for advertising in the 1920s. She was exhibiting paintings in New York in the early 1930s and lived on Christopher Street in Greenwich Village. In 1933, she began the year in January with a one-woman show at the Artists Gallery in the Tower Hotel in New York City and in October she exhibited portraits in an exhibition at the same venue. Though not known as a portrait painter, her works were well received. In 1934, her black and white works, predominantly still lifes were shown in the Art Gallery of the Tower Hotel along with several artists from the Brooklyn Painters and Sculptors' Group. Her work in these shows was given attention and earned Bettersworth invitations to show works at the Corcoran Gallery of Art and the Museum of Modern Art. Her painting Christopher Street, Greenwich Village (1934) was chosen by President Franklin D. Roosevelt to hang in the White House, when he saw it on exhibit at the Corcoran Gallery of Art. By 1936, she and Howard were living in the artists' colony in Woodstock, New York, where Beulah participated in exhibits. Betterworth was selected to complete two murals for the Section of Painting and Sculpture. White Gold in the Delta (1939) for the post office at Indianola, Mississippi, and Out of the Soil for the post office at Columbus, Mississippi, both depict cotton harvesting scenes and did not shy away from depicting white foremen and black laborers. Bettersworth was not the original artist commissioned to complete the work in Indianola, but when Walter Anderson was unable to complete the mural, she was selected. Both at the time they were installed and at present, there have been complaints that the murals depict racist themes and should be removed. The Indianola mural was destroyed and though the argument over whether the Columbus mural should be removed or remain, as it accurately reflects history, is unsettled, the mural is still in place. In 1947, the Betterworths sold their home in Woodstock and by the early 1950s they were living in Tucson, Arizona, where Howard was working as an art director for the Cabat-Gill Advertising Agency. Erni Cabat and Norval Gill, another WPA artist, had founded the agency in the late 1940s. Bettersworth died in Tucson on August 3, 1968, and was buried in Tucson Memorial Park Cemetery.

== Legacy ==
Bettersworth had works shown at the Corcoran Gallery of Art and the Museum of Modern Art. Her painting Christopher Street, Greenwich Village is in the permanent collection of the Smithsonian American Art Museum.
