= Gentry High School (Mississippi) =

Location
- 801 B B King Rd; Indianola, Mississippi 38751; United States; 33.44271°N 90.64178°W

Information
- Type: Public high school
- School district: Sunflower County Consolidated School District (2014-); Indianola School District (-2014)
- Teaching staff: 38.50 (FTE)
- Grades: 9 - 12
- Enrollment: 505 (2023–2024)
- Student to teacher ratio: 13.12
- Color
- Team name: Rams
- Website: http://gentry.sunflower.k12.ms.us/

Location of the town of Indianola, in Sunflower County, Mississippi.

Gentry High School is a public secondary school in Indianola, Mississippi, part of Sunflower County. At 801 B.B. King Road, the school is part of the Sunflower County Consolidated School District and was formerly part of the Indianola School District.

== History ==
=== Segregation ===
Historically the town of Indianola maintained separate high schools for its black and white students, with African-American students from one part of town enrolled at Gentry High School and white students enrolled elsewhere. In April 1969 the U.S. 5th Circuit Court of Appeals ruled that the desegregation plan adopted by the Indianola Municipal Separate School District was unconstitutional. The town's de facto segregation, banned by the 1954 landmark United States Supreme Court case of Brown v. Board of Education, was finally addressed, with the white high school converted to a junior high school while Gentry High School was integrated.

"white flight" followed, with an overwhelming percentage of the white students of Indianola enrolled at Indianola Academy, a segregation academy which, as a private school, was not subject to federally mandated desegregation.

A great degree of segregation has largely continued over the subsequent decades. As of 1996, nearly 90% of Indianola's public school students were of African-American ethnic heritage. Meanwhile, Indianola Academy's student body, which numbered between 500 and 1,000 students over the school's first three decades of existence, included only four or five black students during that entire time.

== Athletics ==
Gentry's team nickname is the Rams and the school's athletic teams compete in Mississippi's 4A Division.

== Campus ==
The current Gentry campus was built in 1952, after a fire destroyed the previous campus. The campus consists of multiple buildings in a partially outdoor style. They were described by Sarah Carr of The Atlantic as "worn." As of 2012 many buildings did not have air conditioning, and so are very hot during summer months and very cold in winter months. Carr said "Computers crash constantly because of low bandwidth."

Gentry students walk in the outdoors between several of their classes. Floodwaters about 1-foot (0.30 m) deep appear during rainy periods. Sinkholes appear in hallways because outdoor sewage and drainage systems are outdated. In 2012, Gentry students believed that the white leaders of Sunflower County built the campus in a manner that would discourage black students from attending school in cold or rainy environments.

One plaque at the entrance of the school states that the campus was erected in 1952 for the "special consolidated school district for colored" for southern Sunflower County.

== Demographics ==
As of 2012 the school's student body was 98% black, 1% Hispanic, and 1% White.

== Academics ==
Sarah Carr of The Atlantic said "Compared to Indianola Academy, Gentry High School is an open book, its academic struggles exposed to the world" and that "Gentry has struggled with test scores since the state's accountability system began in the 1990s." In 2011, 56% had passing scores in Algebra, 17% had passing scores in Biology, 51% of Gentry students had passing scores in English, and 42% had passing scores in History.

Some teachers do not permit students to take home textbooks because they fear that the textbooks will be lost. In the 2011-2012 school year, the school provided older textbooks on government stating that George H. W. Bush was the President of the United States when the president was Barack Obama.

Carr said that "students like" LaToysha Brown, a Gentry student quoted in Carr's 2012 article, said that "the poor scores are at least partly because the school lacks the resources it needs to be successful."

== Student behavior ==
The school uses paddling, a form of corporal punishment, to correct student misbehavior. In 2012, Earl Watkins, the conservator appointed by the State of Mississippi to oversee the Indianola School District, said that "Because corporal punishment has been a practice for many years in the district, professional development must precede the reduction/phase-out of it." He said that teachers had been taught other disciplining strategies.

Primus Apolonio, a Gentry student, said in 2012 that, as paraphrased by Sarah Carr of The Atlantic, "poorly behaved students also keep Gentry down — partly by scaring away the teachers." He explained that "The students are disrespectful to the point where the teachers don't stay. And the school [administration] does not do anything but paddle them and send them back to class." Apolonio said that the lack of resources contributes to the discipline issues, explaining that "During the winter it gets cold and the heaters don't work in the classrooms. Of course the kids are going to get more disruptive."

There were six Teach for America teachers brought into the school in the fall of 2011. Normally Teach for America teachers make two-year commitments. According to Gentry employees, five left after one year because, as paraphrased by Carr, "for personal reasons, or because of frustration with the job."

== Notable alumni ==
- Robert Kent (2000) - former professional football quarterback
- LaDarius Galloway (2014) - current indoor football running back

== See also ==
- List of high schools in Mississippi
