= Downtown Booneville Historic District =

Historic district in Mississippi, United States

- U.S. National Register of Historic Places
- U.S. Historic district
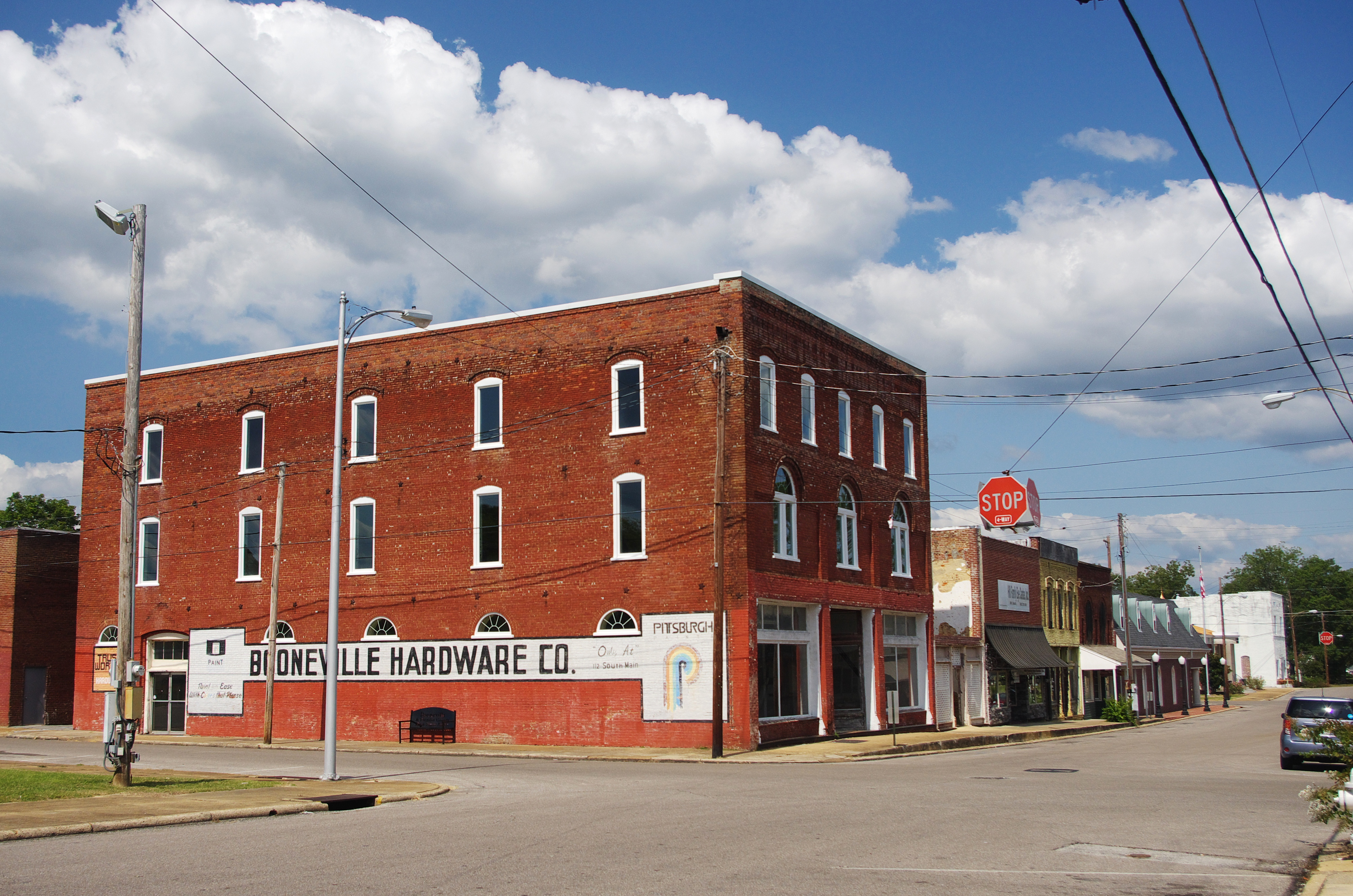
- Booneville Hardware Store, a contributing property in the Downtown Historic District

- Location within Mississippi Location within the United States
- Location: Roughly bounded by Church, College, Court, First, Hotel, Main, Market and Mill Sts., Booneville, Mississippi
- Coordinates: 34°39′21″N 88°33′48″W
- Area: 10 acres (4.0 ha)
- Built: 1922
- Architectural style: Italianate, Colonial Revival, Mission/Spanish Revival
- NRHP reference No.: 98001337
- Added to NRHP: November 5, 1998

The Downtown Booneville Historic District in Booneville, Mississippi is a 10 acres (4.0 ha) historic district which was listed on the National Register of Historic Places in 1998. It then included 32 contributing buildings and 16 non-contributing ones.

Significant buildings in the district include:

- Old Post Office, 100 North Main Street, (Colonial Revival)
- Prentiss County Courthouse (c.1925), 101 North Main Street, (Mediterranean Revival)
- Masonic Lodge, 104 North Main Street,
- 101 South Main Street,
- 106 South Main Street, (Italianate),
- Booneville Hardware Store, 112 South Main Street, (Italianate),
- Mobile & Ohio Railroad Depot, 100 West Church Street, (Late 19th Century Railroad Depot),
- Warehouse at 101 East Church Street, and
- Ashcroft Feeds Store.

The old Post Office includes a mural by artist Stefan Hirsch, completed in 1943 under the Treasury Bureau's Section of Fine Arts program at the cost of $750 (see accompanying photo #9).

The Prentiss County Courthouse is a three-story Mediterranean Revival-style hipped roof brick building with a five bay arcaded loggia and two two-story flat-roofed wings (see accompanying photo #10).
