= Karl Wolfe =

American artist

- Born: January 25, 1903; Brookhaven, Mississippi, U.S.
- Died: November 19, 1984 (aged 81); Jackson, Mississippi, U.S.
- Resting place: Lakewood Memorial Park, Jackson, Mississippi, U.S.
- Education: Chicago Academy of Fine Arts
- Occupations: Painter, stained glass, mosaic and terracotta artist
- Spouse: Mildred Wolfe (m. 1944)
- Children: 2

Karl Wolfe (January 25, 1903 – November 19, 1984) was an American portrait painter and stained glass, mosaic and terracotta artist from Mississippi. He did over 1,000 paintings, including 800 portraits.

== Life ==
Wolfe was born on January 25, 1903, in Brookhaven, Mississippi. He grew up in Columbia, Mississippi, and graduated from the Chicago Academy of Fine Arts.

For five decades, Wolfe was a portrait painter, stained glass, mosaic and terracotta artist in Jackson, Mississippi. He did over 1,000 paintings, including 800 portraits. His portraits depicted Mississippi governors, justices of the Mississippi Supreme Court, and even presidents; for example, his portrait of President Andrew Jackson was installed in the Jackson City Hall. Wolfe co-designed a bronze sculpture for the Mitchell Memorial Library at Mississippi State University. Wolfe co-founded the Mississippi Art Colony in Way, Mississippi, in 1948 and taught art at Millsaps College.

Wolfe married Mildred Nungester, also a painter, and they had a son, Michael, and a daughter, Elizabeth. He died on November 19, 1984, in Jackson, Mississippi, at age 80, and he was buried in the Lakewood Memorial Park.

== Works ==
- Wolfe, Karl (1979). Mississippi Artist: A Self-Portrait. Jackson, Mississippi: University Press of Mississippi. ISBN 9780878051069. OCLC 5286465.
