= Douglas Abraham =

American politician (born 1937)

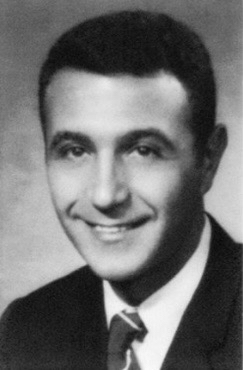

Member of the Mississippi House of Representatives
- In office 1968–1980

Personal details
- Born: George Douglas Abraham; June 19, 1937 (age 89) Greenville, Mississippi, U.S.
- Education: University of Mississippi

George Douglas Abraham (born June 19, 1937) is an American politician. He served as a member of the Mississippi House of Representatives.

== Life and career ==
Abraham was born in Greenville, Mississippi. He attended Greenville High School and the University of Mississippi.

Abraham served in the Mississippi House of Representatives from 1968 to 1980.
