= Indianola, Mississippi =

City in Sunflower County, Mississippi

- City
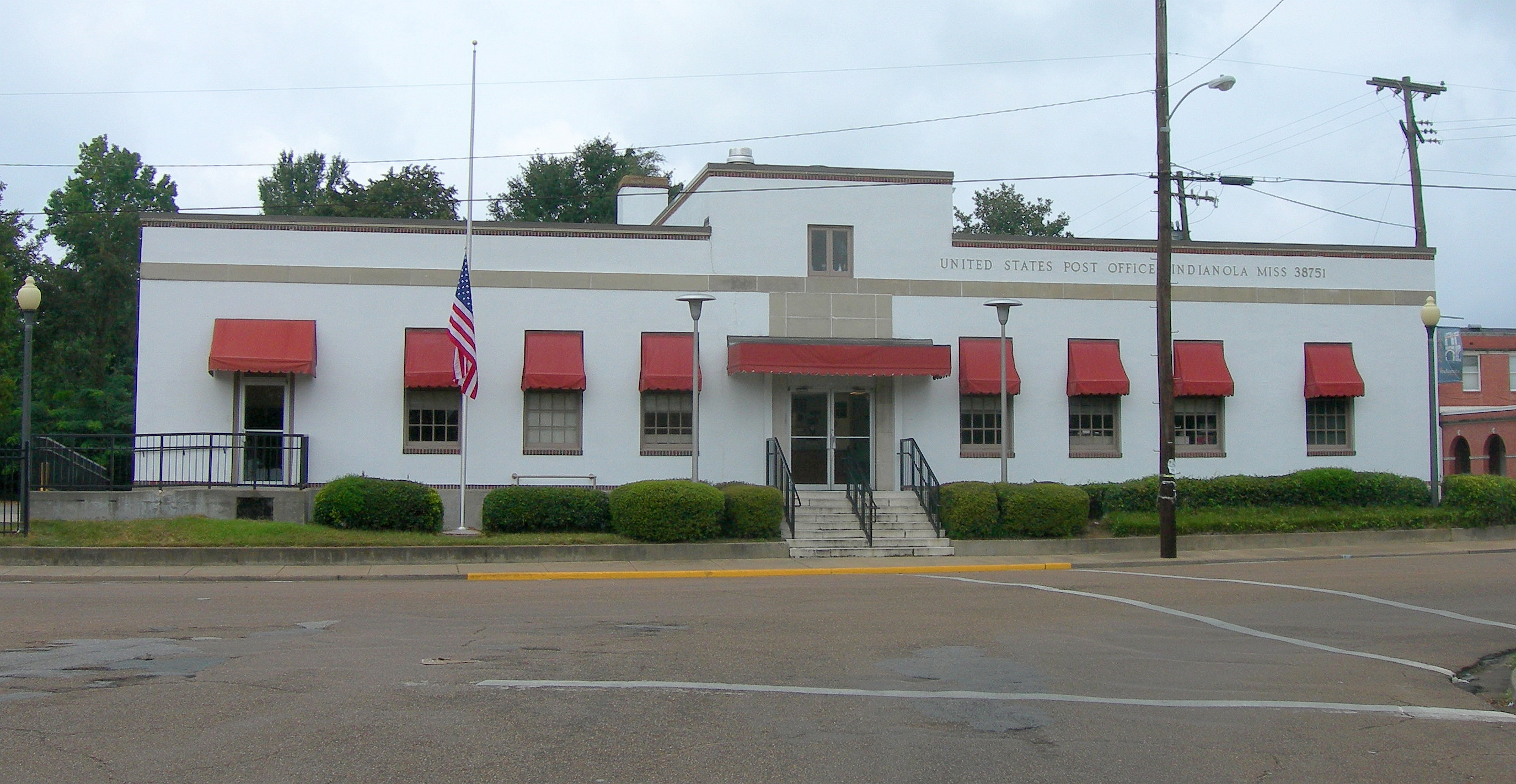
- Minnie Cox Post Office Building in Indianola

- Flag Seal

- Location of Indianola, Mississippi

- Location in the contiguous United States
- Coordinates: 33°27′04″N 90°38′15″W
- Country: United States
- State: Mississippi
- County: Sunflower

Government
  - Mayor: Ken Featherstone (D)

Area
  - Total: 8.66 sq mi (22.42 km^{2})
  - Land: 8.57 sq mi (22.20 km^{2})
  - Water: 0.089 sq mi (0.23 km^{2})
- Elevation: 121 ft (37 m)

Population (2020)
  - Total: 9,646
  - Density: 1,125.4/sq mi (434.53/km^{2})
- ZIP codes: 38751
- FIPS code: 28-34740
- GNIS feature ID: 2404760
- Website: indianolams.gov

Indianola is a city in and the county seat of Sunflower County, Mississippi, United States, in the Mississippi Delta. As of the 2020 census, Indianola had a population of 9,646.

== History ==
On June 30, 1874 the town was surveyed and on April 14, 1885 an addition was made from the land of G. W. Faison. The population of the town was 1098 in 1900. In 1891, Minnie M. Cox was appointed postmaster of Indianola, becoming the first black female postmaster in the United States. Her rank was raised from fourth class to third class in 1900, and she was appointed to a full four-year term. Cox's position was one of the most respected and lucrative public posts in Indianola, as it served approximately 3,000 patrons and paid $1,100 annually, then a large sum. White resentment to Cox's prestigious position began to grow, and in 1902 some white residents in Indianola drew up a petition requesting Cox's resignation. James K. Vardaman, editor of The Greenwood Commonwealth and a white supremacist, began delivering speeches reproaching the people of Indianola for "tolerating a negro wench as a postmaster."

Racial tensions grew, and threats of physical harm led Cox to submit her resignation to take effect on January 1, 1903. The incident attracted national attention, and President Theodore Roosevelt refused to accept her resignation, feeling Cox had been wronged, and the authority of the federal government was being compromised. "Roosevelt stood resolute. Unless Cox's detractors could prove a reason for her dismissal other than the color of her skin, she would remain the Indianola postmistress."

Roosevelt closed Indianola's post office on January 2, 1903, and rerouted mail to Greenville; Cox continued to receive her salary. The same month, the United States Senate debated the Indianola postal event for four hours, and Cox left Indianola for her own safety and did not return. In February 1904, the post office was reopened but was demoted in rank from third class to fourth class.

In July 1954, two months after the Supreme Court of the United States announced its unanimous decision in Brown v. Board of Education, ruling that school segregation was unconstitutional, the local plantation manager Robert B. Patterson met with a group of like-minded people in a private home in Indianola to form the White Citizens' Council.

In May 2023, the police's shooting of Aderrien Murry, an 11-year-old, occurred in the city.

== Geography ==
Indianola is 30 miles (48 km) west of Greenwood.

=== Climate ===
The climate in this area is characterized by hot, humid summers and generally mild to cool winters. According to the Köppen Climate Classification system, Indianola has a humid subtropical climate, abbreviated "Cfa" on climate maps.

== Demographics ==
Historical population
Census	Pop.	Note	%±
1890	249		—
1900	630		153.0%
1910	1,098		74.3%
1920	2,112		92.3%
1930	3,116		47.5%
1940	3,604		15.7%
1950	4,369		21.2%
1960	6,714		53.7%
1970	8,947		33.3%
1980	8,050		−10.0%
1990	11,809		46.7%
2000	12,066		2.2%
2010	10,683		−11.5%
2020	9,646		−9.7%
U.S. Decennial Census

=== 2020 census ===
As of the 2020 census, there were 9,646 people, 3,544 households, and 2,209 families in the city. The median age was 38.5 years. 24.4% of residents were under the age of 18 and 15.7% of residents were 65 years of age or older. For every 100 females there were 84.6 males, and for every 100 females age 18 and over there were 79.6 males age 18 and over.

96.8% of residents lived in urban areas, while 3.2% lived in rural areas.

There were 3,544 households in Indianola, of which 36.0% had children under the age of 18 living in them. Of all households, 29.2% were married-couple households, 16.9% were households with a male householder and no spouse or partner present, and 46.8% were households with a female householder and no spouse or partner present. About 27.4% of all households were made up of individuals and 11.6% had someone living alone who was 65 years of age or older.

There were 3,905 housing units, of which 9.2% were vacant. The homeowner vacancy rate was 1.8% and the rental vacancy rate was 8.0%.

Racial composition as of the 2020 census
Race	Number	Percent
White	1,525	15.8%
Black or African American	7,792	80.8%
American Indian and Alaska Native	5	0.1%
Asian	71	0.7%
Native Hawaiian and Other Pacific Islander	0	0.0%
Some other race	78	0.8%
Two or more races	175	1.8%
Hispanic or Latino (of any race)	141	1.5%

=== 2000 census ===
As of the census of 2000, there were 12,066 people, 3,899 households, and 2,982 families living in the city. The population density was 1,400.3 inhabitants per square mile (540.7/km^{2}). There were 4,118 housing units at an average density of 477.9 per square mile (184.5/km^{2}). The racial makeup of the city was 25.73% White, 73.38% African American, 0.01% Native American, 0.46% Asian American, 0.16% from other races, and 0.27% from two or more races. Hispanic or Latino of any race were 0.71% of the population.

=== 1990 census ===
As of the census of 1990, there were 11,809 people. The racial makeup of the city was 65.69% (7,757) Black or African American, 33.39% (3,943) White, 0.14% (17) Native American, 0.19% (23) Asian American, and 0.03% (4) from other races. 0.55% (65) were Hispanic or Latino of any race.

== Economy ==
Because Indianola is located at the intersection of U.S. Route 49W and U.S. Route 82, as of 2004 it is one of the last economically viable small towns in the Mississippi Delta. In the 1980s and 1990s, the city government convinced a major retailer to build a distribution center near the intersection of the two highways. This development infused cash into the local economy and allowed semiskilled jobs to be established.

In August 2011, Delta Pride, a catfish processing company, closed its plant in Indianola.

== Culture ==
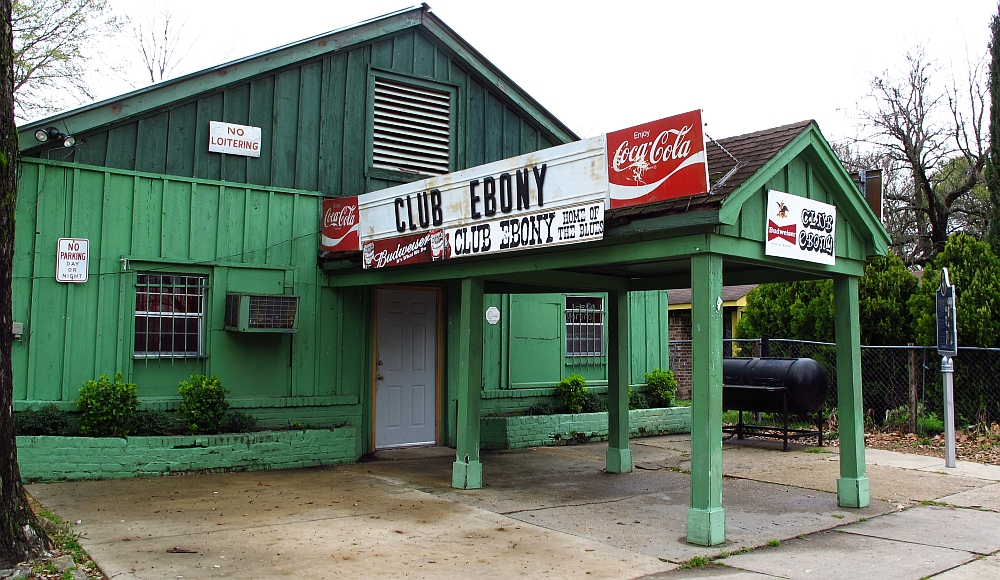
Club Ebony in Indianola

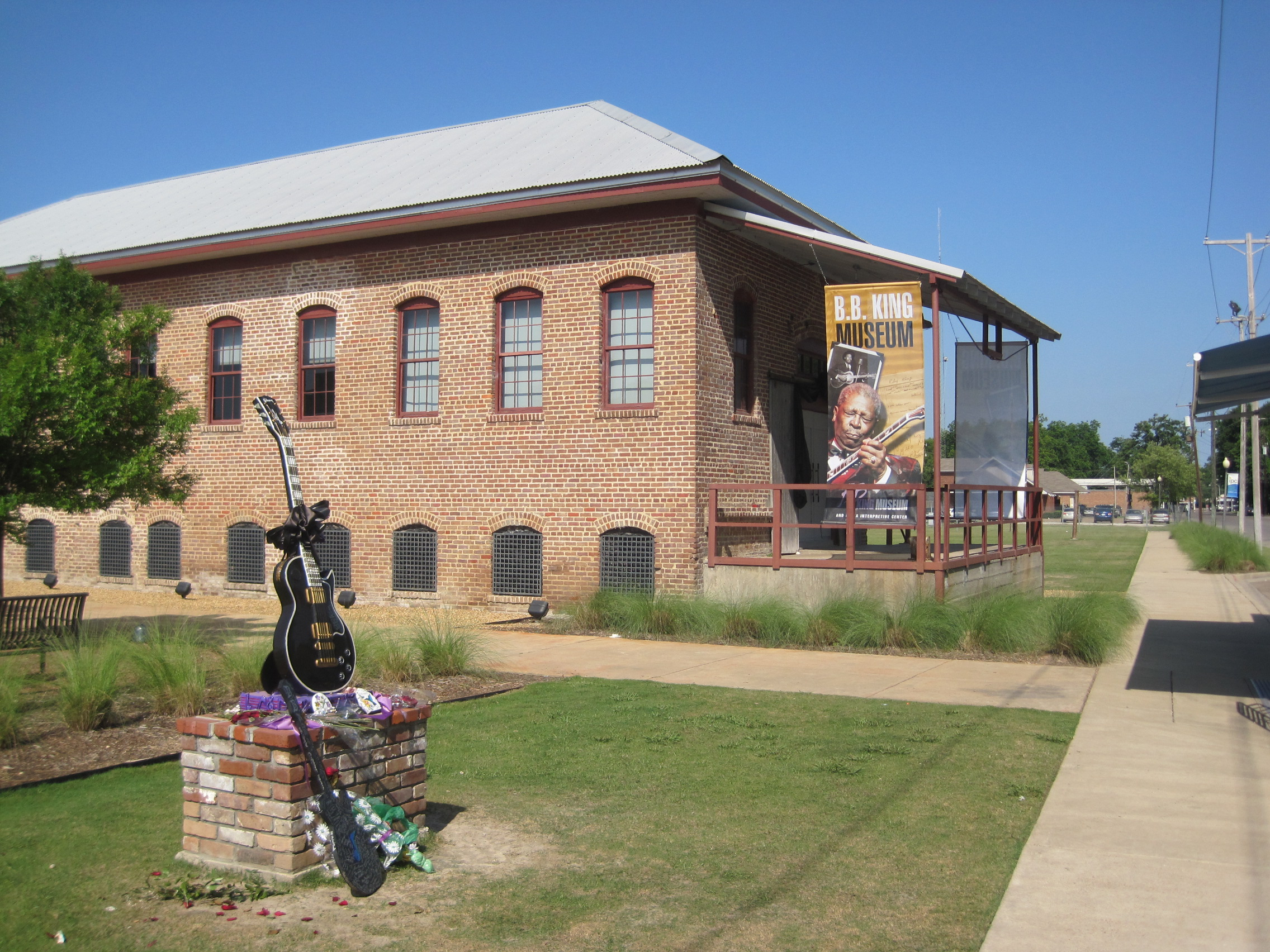
B.B. King Museum and Delta Interpretive Center

J. Todd Moye, author of Let the People Decide: Black Freedom and White Resistance Movements in Sunflower County, Mississippi, 1945–1986, said that "Life in Indianola still moves at a pace established by its distinguishing characteristic, the picturesque and languid Indian Bayou that winds through downtown."

=== Blues ===
Indianola is the birthplace of the blues musician Albert King. The blues harp player, Little Arthur Duncan, was born in Indianola in 1934.

B.B. King grew up in Indianola as a child. He came to the blues festival named after him every year. King referenced the city with the title of his 1970 album Indianola Mississippi Seeds. The B.B. King Museum and Delta Interpretive Center, a $14 million facility dedicated to King and the blues, opened in September 2008.

== Education ==
The Sunflower County Consolidated School District, headquartered in Indianola, operates public schools serving the city. Residents are zoned to Lockard Elementary School (K-2), Carver Elementary School (3-6), Robert L. Merritt Junior High School (7-9), and Gentry High School (10-12). The district operates two other 10-12 schools in the city, Indianola Career and Technical Center and Indianola Academic Achievement Academy.

Indianola Academy, a private school and former segregation academy, is in Indianola. As of 2012 most white teenagers in Indianola attend Indianola Academy instead of the public high schools. Sarah Carr of The Atlantic explained that there are two explanations of why the private academies in Indianola and other towns still exist. One says that the public schools suffered from poor leadership and wrongdoing and that the private academies thrive because of the failings of the public schools, and the other says that the white leadership starved the public schools of resources after the academies were enacted, leading to the failings of the public schools.

The Sunflower County Library operates the Henry M. Seymour Library in Indianola, which houses its administrative headquarters.

=== History of education ===
Prior to the school district merger, the Sunflower County School District had its headquarters in the Sunflower County Courthouse in Indianola. The district's educational services building is along U.S. Route 49 West in Indianola.

As of 1996, 90 per cent of students in the Indianola School District were black. Most of the white students who attend Indianola public schools transfer to private schools by junior high school.

== Government and infrastructure ==
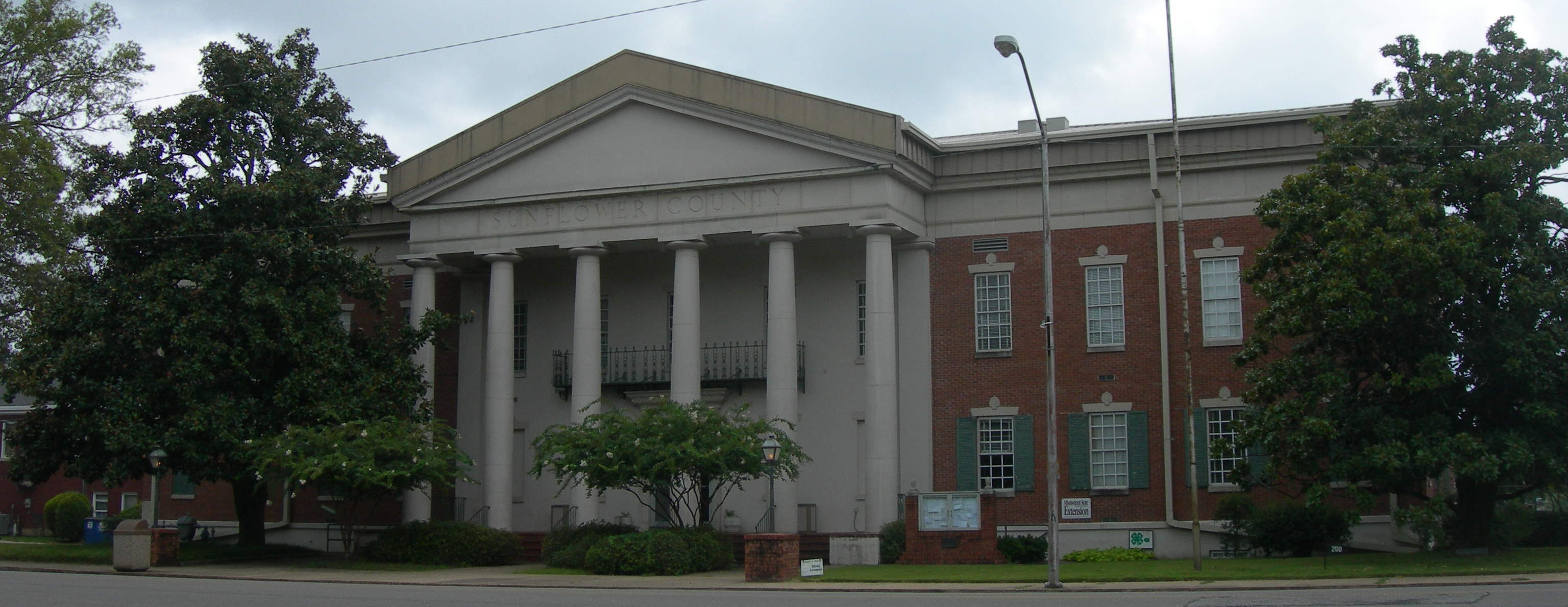
Sunflower County Courthouse

The Mississippi Department of Corrections operates a probation and parole office in the Courthouse Annex in Indianola.

The United States Postal Service operates the Indianola Post Office. A mural, entitled White Gold in the Delta by WPA Section of Painting and Sculpture artist Beulah Bettersworth, was installed in the post office in 1939. It depicted cotton harvesting scenes. Murals were produced from 1934 to 1943 in the United States through the Section of Painting and Sculpture, later called the Section of Fine Arts, of the U.S. Treasury Department. The original artist Walter Anderson was unable to complete the mural, and Bettersworth was selected. The mural was eventually destroyed. In 2008, the building was named the Minnie Cox Post Office Building by an act of Congress.

== Notable people ==
- Mary Alice, was an American television, film, and stage actress
- Percy W. Allen, member of the Mississippi Senate from 1932 to 1940
- Otis Anthony, member of the Mississippi House of Representatives
- Coolidge Ball, first African American athlete at the University of Mississippi
- Mr. Bo, an American electric blues guitarist, singer and songwriter.
- Ovie Carter, photographer. Won the 1975 Pulitzer Prize for International Reporting.
- Willie Clayton, Chicago blues artist
- Minnie M. Cox, postmaster
- William Harold Cox, former United States district judge of the United States District Court for the Southern District of Mississippi
- Little Arthur Duncan, a harmonica player, singer, and songwriter.
- Vera Chandler Foster, an American social worker
- LaDarius Galloway, former professional football running back
- Jazz Gillum, Chicago blues harmonica player
- Bill L. Harbert, businessman and founder of B.L. Harbert International
- George Jackson, an American songwriter and singer.
- Edward A. Jones, an African-American author
- Robert Kent, former professional football quarterback
- Albert King, a blues guitarist and singer
- B.B. King, an American blues singer-songwriter, guitarist, and record producer.
- Sam Lacey, former NBA player
- George Washington Lee, soldier, writer, and political leader
- Howard McCalebb, sculptor
- William McCoy, former member of the Oregon Legislative Assembly
- Charles McLaurin, civil rights organizer
- Brew Moore, jazz saxophonist
- Chico Potts, basketball coach
- William Richardson, former member of the Mississippi House of Representatives
- Steve Sanders, marital artist and police officer
- Micheal Spurlock, an American football wide receiver
- Sara Thomas, member of the Mississippi House of Representatives from 1999 to 2019
- Bill Triplett, former running back in the NFL
- Mel Triplett, former NFL fullback
- A. Maceo Walker, businessman
- Elliott Walker, former NFL running back
- Quinton Williams, physicist
- Ellis Wyms, former NFL defensive tackle
- Steve Yarbrough, author and academic

== Transportation ==
Indianola Municipal Airport is located in unincorporated Sunflower County, near Indianola. and operated by the city.

== Media ==
The Enterprise-Tocsin has its offices in Indianola.

== In the media ==
- Art students at Gentry High School in Indianola earned a listing in Guinness World Records on June 7, 2003, by creating the world's largest comic strip in their school parking lot. The giant Lucky Cow comic strip was big enough to cover 35 school buses, measuring 135 ft. wide and 47.8 ft. high.
- The book Two years in the Mississippi Delta recounts Michael Copperman's stint with the Teach for America program in Indianola, renamed "Promise" in the book.

== See also ==
- 1990 Delta Pride strike - A labor strike that took place in Indianola
