= Jon Monday =

American record producer (born 1947)

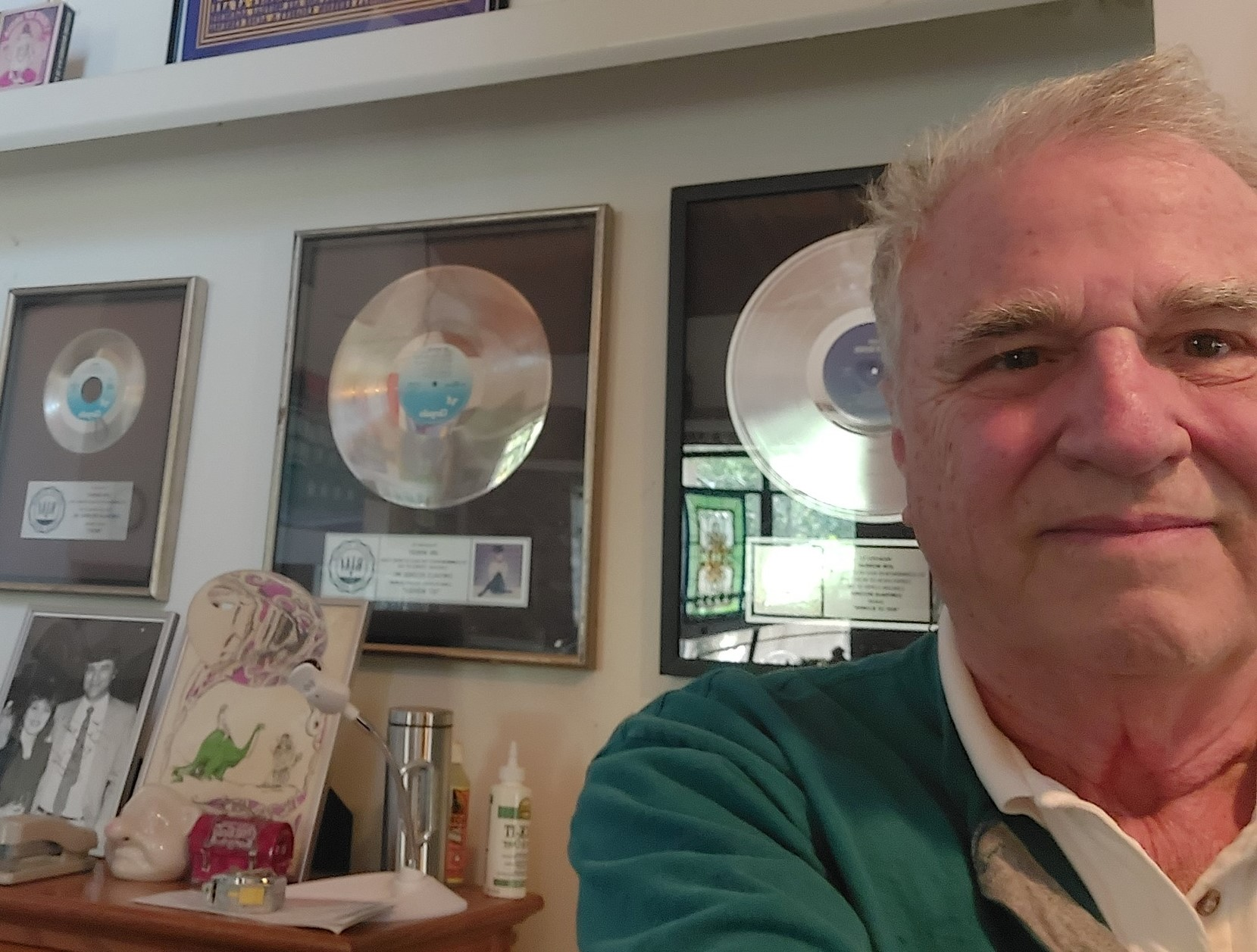
- Monday in 2023
- Born: 1947 (age 78–79); San Jose, California, United States
- Occupations: Music and Film Producer
- Known for: Music and Video Producer
- Political party: Democratic Party
- Spouse: Anna Monday
- Children: Rachel Monday
- Website: www.mondaymedia.org

Jon Monday (born 1947) is an American producer and distributor of CDs and DVDs across an eclectic range of material such as Swami Prabhavananda, Aldous Huxley, Christopher Isherwood, Huston Smith, and Chalmers Johnson. In 1980 Monday filmed what turned out to be the very last live poetry reading Charles Bukowski gave, at the Sweetwater in Redondo Beach, which was released as The Last Straw on DVD. Monday directed and co-produced with Jennifer Douglas the feature-length documentary Save KLSD: Media Consolidation and Local Radio. He was also President of Benchmark Recordings from 2008 to 2025, which owned and distributed the early catalog of The Fabulous Thunderbirds CDs and a live recording of Mike Bloomfield. After retiring, his work with Huston Smith and the Vedanta Society of Southern California has created audio and video commercial releases as well as establishing free online archives of the historic material. For nearly 60 years, Monday has been a Vedantist, and is associated with the Vedanta Society of Southern California, a branch of the Ramakrishna Order in India.

== Music business ==
Monday got his start in multimedia through his own psychedelic light-show company in the Bay Area in early 1967, providing visuals for concerts by Country Joe and the Fish, Janis Joplin's Big Brother and the Holding Company, Quicksilver Messenger Service, The Loading Zone, and Steve Miller's Blues Band at local Berkeley, California venues and The Fillmore in San Francisco.

In 1970, Monday was hired by John Fahey at Takoma Records in Santa Monica, as their first full-time employee, becoming promotion director in 1972, and later general manager. working with guitar artists such as Leo Kottke, John Fahey, Mike Bloomfield, Robbie Basho, Rick Ruskin, and Peter Lang. Eventually, he became Takoma's vice president and General Manager, and also provided art direction, engineering, and/or produced albums by such artists as George Winston, Norman Blake, Peter Rowan, Jim Kweskin, Loudon Wainwright III, and Joseph Byrd.

Since the Takoma Offices were next door to McCabe's Guitar Shop, in 1978, Monday had the idea to move the business offices upstairs and designed and built a 16-track studio in what had been the downstairs office. He ran microphone and video cables to the sound booth at McCabe's - so concerts could be recorded at the Takoma Studios. That launched the "Live at McCabe's" concert recording series, which were released on Takoma and other labels.

In 1979, Fahey sold Takoma Records to a new company formed by music business attorney Bill Coben, veteran producer/manager Denny Bruce, and Chrysalis Records. Monday continued with the new company as General Manager. During that time, Takoma signed and released albums by The Fabulous Thunderbirds, Canned Heat, and T-Bone Burnett. Monday also co-produced a live album, Gospel Nights, by Maria Muldaur. The concert was at McCabes Guitar Shop in Santa Monica and recorded at Takoma Studios.

In early 1982, Chrysalis shut down Takoma as an stand-alone label, and Monday was appointed sales manager for the short-lived Chrysalis Visual Programming Division, headquartered in Los Angeles with releases on VHS, including The Best of Blondie.

=== Chrysalis Records and the CBS Distribution Transition (1982 - 1983) ===
After shutting down the Visual Programming division, Chrysalis president Sal Licata appointed Monday as Head of Marketing, reporting to Licata. In this capacity, Monday coordinated the promotion, PR, sales, and marketing departments for new releases and tours. He was working with established act like Pat Benetar, Blondie, Huey Lewis, and Billy Idol. The first record Monday worked on was Toni Basil's single "Mickey." Alongside Vice President of Sales Stan Layton, Monday coordinated regional retail tracking and radio promotion. The campaign to the press, retail, and radio pushed "Mickey" to achieved the number-one position on the Billboard Hot 100 chart for the week ending December 11, 1982.

Despite having a catalog of multi-platinum acts, in late December 1982, Chrysalis' owners announced that they pulled the label from independent distribution and entered into a distribution agreement with CBS Records, effective immediately. The structural shift was part of a broader, industry-wide economic consolidation during the 1979–1983 recession, which forced major independent labels, including A&M, Arista, and Motown, to switch from the independent regional network of distributors to major label distribution.

The transition resulted in the immediate termination of approximately 80% of the label's domestic staff, including executive leadership such as President Sal Licata and VP of Sales Stan Layton. Monday was one of 10 employees retained by the company to help execute the transition. Monday's role was to plug into the marketing arm of CBS, prompting a relocation to New York City in early 1983.

At the first meeting with his counterparts at CBS to discuss the upcoming tours and new releases, which would require support at all levels: national and local secondary radio markets and in-store merchandising support. The same functions previously done by the network of Independent Distributors. At the first meeting with his counterparts at CBS, Monday laid out the new release and tour schedule, and outlined the support that would be needed. The guys from CBS said, "We're not doing any of that. We'll get your records into the stores, but that's it." It was a great shock. Monday reported the exchange to the acting president, who said the owners would take care of it. Monday resigned from Chrysalis a month later - believing it was likely the end of the label.

== Silicon Valley ==
In 1984, Monday relocated to Silicon Valley and had a 2nd career as an executive in various software and high-tech companies. He also held senior management positions or consulted with major 3rd party video game publishers, such as Epyx, Eidos Interactive, and Capcom. He was also Vice President of PlayNet, working directly with Atari founder Nolan Bushnell.

Monday's first role in the emerging video game business was with Romox, a company that has developed a kiosk-based video game distribution system. Originally, Monday was hired as Sales Director of Special Markets to provide distribution through the "Rack Jobbers" who got records into Sears, ToysRUs, KMart and other major retailers. Then he was promoted to VP Product Marketing, to help introduce their kiosk. A gamer could buy a blank video game cartridge and download a game from a vast library into the cartridge (for Atari 2600, Atari Computers, TI-99, Commodore, etc.) and play the game for a few weeks. If they got tired of the game, they could bring the cartridge back to the kiosk, erase it, and program a new game into it. The system answered the biggest problem plaguing the industry - the high cost of the cartridges.

One of the game publishers who licensed their titles to Romox was Epyx, headed by Michael Katz. After the cartridge-based video game industry collapsed (due to the overproduction of the Atari game ET, which failed upon release) Monday was originally hired by Epyx as a consultant overseeing IT, manufacturing, and customer service and eventually was promoted to Vice President of IT and Operations.

In 1989. Monday left Epyx to establish MusicWriter Inc., with music research pioneer Larry Heller. During Monday's term as president, the Californian company developed the NoteStation, a point-of-sale kiosk for printing sheet music, in any key, for sale to customers in music stores. In addition to printing sheet music, the NoteStation was able to produce MIDI disks containing selected music. In 1994, NoteStation kiosks were in 175 stores in the United States, Canada and the United Kingdom.

Monday was hired in 1997 as Vice President of PlayNet, working directly with Atari founder Nolan Bushnell, to develop an online jukebox, that was connected to a vast library of songs licensed from the major record companies. The company collapsed in a scandal that ultimately led to Mouli Cohen, the CEO, being prosecuted for fraud and sentenced to over 20 years in federal prison.

In 1998, Monday was hired by Capcom, a leading video game publisher, to design and implement an entire IT overhaul, including replacing an aging mainframe with a Windows-based hardware and enterprise reporting and accounting software. After completing the project he was given the assignment to make their arcade division, Nickel City, profitable by shutting down the unprofitable stores, and beefing up the existing ones. Eventually, Monday oversaw selling the division piece by piece. He was then put in charge of all online business, including developing and implementing the company's first commercial website.

== Retirement ==
Monday retired and moved to the San Diego area in 2004 and launched two labels: mondayMEDIA and GemsTone; producing, directing, and distributing original and archival material.

In 2006 Monday brought together many notable recording artists and produced The Revenge of Blind Joe Death: The John Fahey Tribute Album, which was released on the Takoma Records label, distributed by Fantasy Records. Participating artists included, George Winston, Michael Gulezian, Alex de Grassi, Country Joe McDonald, Peter Lang, Stefan Grossman, Rick Ruskin, and Canned Fish (a one-time collaboration between Canned Heat members Adolfo de la Parra ("Fito") and Larry Taylor, and Country Joe and the Fish member Barry "The Fish" Melton).

In 2008 Monday was asked by Bill Coben and Denny Bruce, founders of Benchmark Recordings, to join as president and run the label. The company had titles by The Fabulous Thunderbirds and Mike Bloomfield. The Fabulous Thunderbirds catalog was sold in 2025 to The Last Music Company in the UK.

In 2012 mondayMEDIA released the feature-length documentary Save KLSD: Media Consolidation and Radio, that documented about the history and effects of media consolidation on democracy in the United States. Filmed over several years, interviews included, Bill Moyers, Robert Reich, Van Jones, Phil Donahue, radio talkshow host Ed Schultz, Cenk Uygur, Amy Goodman, Thom Hartmann, radio talkshow host Stacy Taylor, John Nichols, Richard Wolffe, Randi Rhodes, Congressman Bob Filner, Jon Adelstein, Robert McChesney, Bob Edgar, Mike Aguirre, Marjorie Cohn, Michael Krasny, and author Eric Klinenberg. It is produced by Jennifer Douglas and Jon Monday, and directed by Monday for distribution by mondayMEDIA. It was released on DVD in April 2012. The film's national broadcast premiered on Link TV on Saturday, September 8, 2012 at 2:30pm PST.

== Work with Huston Smith ==
Monday's work with Huston Smith yielded two DVDs, The Roots of Fundamentalism, in 2006 with Phil Cousineau interviewing Huston about the genesis of modern Christian Fundamentalism, which came into existence around 1900 in reaction to modern scholarship into the origin of the biblical scriptures, which raised questions about who really wrote them and when they were written. The second DVD was from 2012, The Arc of Life: Huston Smith on Life, Death & Beyond, was Huston being interviewed by noted American gerontologist and psychologist, Ken Dychtwald. In 2015, Monday released a biographical documentary video about Smith's association with Vedanta and how it impacted his life and career.

In tribute to Huston Smith, Monday received donations to research and restore the original 16mm films of Huston Smith's TV series from the 1950s that ran on National Educational Television (NET), the precursor of PBS. Most of the episodes of The Religions of Man, were located in the archive of the Washington University in St. Louis. A few missing episodes were found in the Library of Congress. Most of the episodes of Smith's second NET series, Search for America, were also found and digitized. Permission for public viewing was granted by all the original stakeholders: KETC, Washington University, NET (via WNET the successor), and the Smith family. The archive includes both NET television series: Religions of Man and Search for America

== Political activism ==
Monday enlisted in the army in March 1965. After completing his basic training and courses in advanced electronics, he volunteered to become a paratrooper and was assigned to the 82nd Airborne Division.

As the Vietnam war escalated, Monday turned his attention to becoming a Conscientious Objector, feeling that the war was unconstitutional and immoral - and did not reflect the high ideals of American democracy. He refused to participate in the war and eventually he was given a court martial, at which he pointed out that the Nuremberg Trials of Nazi war criminals, had established the right and duty of soldiers to object to wars they felt to be illegal and immoral. Monday spent a year in jail and was given a Bad Conduct Discharge. In 1975, Monday was given a full pardon by President Ford, his discharge was changed to a Clemency Discharge, and was awarded a Certificate of Completion by the Selective Service, showing he had fulfilled his duty to his country.

After the start of the Iraq War, Monday joined Veterans For Peace and became active in the San Diego Chapter, giving talks to local colleges, organizing Arlington West memorials, and speaking at anti-war rallies.

In 2004 Monday also became involved with the Fallbrook Democratic Club, becoming a board member and in 2008 was its president. In 2011 he was reelected to the FDC's board as vice president for the 2012 term.

== Credits ==
- 1973 - George Winston, Piano Solos, LP - Takoma Records, Art Director
- 1974 - John Fahey, Fare Forward Voyagers (Soldier's Choice), CD - Takoma Records, Art Director
- 1975 - Joseph Byrd, Yankee Transcendoodle, LP - Takoma Records, Co-producer
- 1975 - Joseph Byrd, A Christmas Yet to Come, LP - Takoma Records, Co-producer
- 1976 - The American Music Consort, Sentimental Songs of the Mid-19th Century, LP Takoma Records, Co-producer
- 1976 - Various Artists, The Walnut Valley Spring Thing, LP Takoma Records, Co-producer
- 1976 - Christopher Isherwood, Selections from the Upanishads, CD - GemsTone, Co-producer
- 1976 - Norman Blake, Live at McCabes, CD - Takoma Records, Art Director
- 1977 - Larry McNeely, Larry McNeely with Jack Skinner and Geoff Levin, LP Takoma Records, Art Direction
- 1978 - Peter Rowan, Peter Rowan, CD Flying Fish Records, Engineer
- 1979 - Loudon Wainwright III, A Live One, CD - Rounder Records, Engineer
- 1979 - Jim Kweskin, Side by Side, CD - Mountain Railroad Records, Engineer
- 1980 - Maria Muldaur, Gospel Nights, CD - Takoma Records, Co-producer
- 2004 - Christopher Isherwood, Lecture on Girish Ghosh, CD - GemsTone, Producer
- 2005 - Huston Smith and Phil Cousineau, The Roots of Fundamentalism, DVD - GemsTone, Producer/Director
- 2005 - Samoan Cultural Preservation Project, The Music of Samoa, CD - GemsTone, Co-Producer/Engineer
- 2006 - Esalen Institute, Envisioning the Future: From Spirit to Social Action, DVD - with Ken Dychtwald, Joanne Shenandoah, Doug George-Kanentiio, Phil Cousineau, Robert Reich, and Huston Smith, Producer/Director
- 2006 - Chalmers Johnson, Evil Empire: A Talk by Chalmers Johnson, DVD - mondayMEDIA, Producer/Director
- 2006 - Various Artists, The Revenge of Blind Joe Death: The John Fahey Tribute Album, CD - Takoma/Fantasy, Producer
- 2007 - Esalen Institute, A Time for Solutions, DVD - with Ken Dychtwald, John Cleese, Deepak Chopra, Robert Reich, Mollie Katzen, Michael Murphy, Jay Alexander, and Kathy Smith, Producer/Director
- 2008 - Charles Bukowski, There's Gonna Be a God Damn Riot in Here, DVD - mondayMEDIA, Producer
- 2008 - Charles Bukowski, The Last Straw, DVD - mondayMEDIA, Producer/Director
- 2008 - Esalen Institute, The Way Forward, DVD - with Ken Dychtwald, Amory Lovins, Robert Reich, Sam Keen, Chungliang Al Huang, Anna Halprin, Michael Murphy, Joseph Montville, Patricia de Jong, and Anisa Mehdt, Producer/Director
- 2009 - Esalen Institute, Vision & Visionaries: The Alchemy of Transformation, DVD - with Ken Dychtwald, Robert Reich, Bob Herbert, Isabel Allende, Michael Krasny, Nina Simons, Kenny Ausubel, Akuyoe Graham, Greg Hodge, and Michael Murphy, Producer/Director
- 2010 - Charles Bukowski, One Tough Mother, DVD - mondayMEDIA, Co-producer/Director
- 2010 - Esalen Institute, Living a Purposeful Life, DVD - with Ken Dychtwald, Robert Reich, Eric Schlosser, Chungliang Al Huang, David Darling, Richard Tarnas, Jeffery Kripal, and Michael Murphy, Producer/Director
- 2011 - The Fabulous Thunderbirds, The Best of the Fabulous Thunderbirds: Early Birds Special, CD - Benchmark Recordings, Co-producer
- 2011 – Esalen Institute, Connections: The Elixer of Life, DVD – with Ken Dychtwald, Michael Murphy, Gordon Wheeler, Tricia McEntee, Sam Yau, Michael Krasney, Dani Shapiro, Akuyoe Graham, Van Jones, and Maddy Dychtwald, Producer/Director
- 2012 - Huston Smith, The Arc of Life: Huston Smith on Life, Death & Beyond with Ken Dychtwald, DVD - mondayMEDIA - Director and Producer
- 2012 - Save KLSD: Media Consolidation and Local Radio, DVD - with Bill Moyers, Robert Reich, Van Jones, Phil Donahue, Ed Schultz, David Shuster, Cenk Uygur, Amy Goodman, Thom Hartmann, Stacy Taylor, John Nichols, Richard Wolffe, Randi Rhodes, Congressman Bob Filner, Jon Adelstein, Robert McChesney, Bob Edgar, Mike Aguirre, Marjorie Cohn, Michael Krasny, J.W. August, Andrew Donohue, Marti Emerald, and Eric Klinenberg - mondayMEDIA - Co-producer and Director|
- 2012 - Esalen’s 50th Anniversary Benefit Weekend, DVD - with Robert Reich, Marianne Williamson, Byron Katie, Michael Murphy, Anna Halprin, Al Huang, Joan Baez, and Ken Dychtwald.

== Published articles ==
- Elizabeth Cotton: Folk Guitar Legend, Guitar Player, March 1975
- A Personal Lesson About the End of Time, The Vedanta Kesari, India, December 1993
- A Personal Lesson About the End of Time, Vedanta for East and West, UK, January / February 1994
- For the Historic Record, American Vedantist, US Vol. 3, no. 3, Fall 1997.
- I Saw Swamiji on TV Last Night, American Vedantist, US, Summer 1998
- The Limitations of Mental Models Vedanta, UK, November / December 2002
- The Limitations of Mental Models The Vedanta Kesari, India, April 2003
- The Gospel of Chomsky, Vedanta, UK, January / February 2005
- Broken Pot, a Haiku Poem, American Vedantist, US, October 2013
- J.D. Salinger & Vedanta, American Vedantist, US, January 2014 - co-written with Anna Monday
- Christopher Isherwood and Vedanta, American Vedantist, US, Winter 2014/2015 - co-written with Anna Monday
- The History and Impact of the Swami Prabhavananda – Christopher Isherwood Bhagavad Gita Translation, American Vedantist, US, Spring 2018
