= World religions (disambiguation) =

World religions is a paradigm in the academic study of religion. It encompasses a number of major religious groups in the world.

World religions may also refer to:

- World Religions (TV series), 1973 television series
- "World Religions" (Mr. D), 3rd episode of the TV series Mr. D season 2
- The World's Religions, a book by Huston Smith
