= Dychtwald =

Dychtwald, Dichtwald is a surname. German 'dicht Wald' means 'dense forest'. Notable people with the surname include:

- Maddy Dychtwald, American writer, wife of Ken
- Ken Dychtwald (born 1950), American psychologist, husband of Maddy
