= McCabe =

McCabe may refer to:

== People ==
- McCabe (surname), origin of the names MacCabe/McCabe and a list of people with the surnames

== Places ==
- McCabe Memorial Church
- McCabe Creek (disambiguation)
- McCabe school
- McCabe Lake

== Music ==
- Live at McCabe's (disambiguation), multiple albums

== Other ==
- McCabe v. Atchison
- McCabe complexity of software
- McCabe–Thiele method
- McCabe-Powers Body Company
- McCabe's Guitar Shop
- McCabe & Mrs. Miller
