= PlayNet =

American technology company

PlayNet Technologies (formerly known as Aristo International) was a publicly traded technology and out-of-home entertainment company active during the mid-to-late 1990s. Headquartered with offices in San Francisco, New York, and Virginia, the company pioneered early Coin-operated internet-connected touchscreen video games and an innovative online digital jukebox for the hospitality sector: bars, hotels, and restaurants, and via coin-operated entertainment kiosks.

While PlayNet successfully attracted a high-profile executive team, including Atari founder Nolan Bushnell, the company ultimately collapsed under mounting debt, filing for Chapter 11 bankruptcy in 1998. Following the company's demise, its founder and CEO, Mouli Cohen, became involved in a massive investment fraud scheme.

== History ==
Mouli Cohen, who migrated to the United States from Israel in 1987, formed Aristo International in the early 1990s before transitioning the company's name to PlayNet Technologies. Operating as a publicly traded company on the Nasdaq, PlayNet's core vision was to bring internet connectivity into the hospitality industry via coin-operated entertainment kiosks.

The systems were designed to allow patrons to play networked video games, download digital music, send emails, and purchase tickets using cash or charge cards. To jump-start its software library and technical capabilities, Aristo International acquired Borta, Inc., a video game development studio founded by Ron Borta, for $10 million in stock in 1995.

== Executive team ==
To realize this vision, Cohen assembled a veteran team drawn from the highest echelons of the video game, music, and entertainment industries:

- Mouli Cohen: Served as President, Chief Executive Officer, and Chairman of the board.
- Nolan Bushnell: The founder of Atari and Chuck E. Cheese joined the company in 1996. Initially approached to be chairman, Bushnell instead took on the role of director of strategic planning.
- Glenn Sblendorio: Former Chief Financial Officer of Sony Entertainment.
- Jon Monday: A music and media producer who was hired in January 1997 as Vice President. Monday reported directly to Bushnell and was tasked specifically with developing the company's online jukebox.
- Joe Ybarra: A seasoned game producer who had been heavily involved in the startup phase of Electronic Arts and Apple.
- Michael Katz: The former Atari CEO worked with the company as a paid consultant during the Borta, Inc. acquisition phase.

== Products ==
The company developed two main hardware products, heavily investing in research and development to pioneer early internet kiosks.

=== Bar-top touchscreen game machine ===
The flagship product for PlayNet was a touchscreen-controlled "bar top" coin-operated video game machine. The idea was to develop interactive stands for hotels and restaurants that would allow patrons to play games alone or in teams connected across the internet.

The company briefly captured the attention of the hospitality and gaming industries. In October 1997, PlayNet announced a pilot program to install its touchscreen terminals in a minimum of six Holiday Inn and Crowne Plaza hotel locations across the United States. During this peak, industry press took note of the company's momentum, with magazines like Next Generation noting that PlayNet made a "big splash" as a glamorous internet arcade startup.

=== Digital jukebox ===
A core pillar of PlayNet's hardware strategy was its internet-connected digital jukebox. Unlike traditional CD jukeboxes of the era, the PlayNet system was capable of storing an extremely large selection of songs locally while utilizing its internet connection to continually download new releases. Under the direction of Jon Monday and Nolan Bushnell, the project's ambitious goal was to connect the hardware to a vast digital library featuring music licensed from major record labels, allowing patrons to access an unprecedented on-demand catalog.

== Demise and bankruptcy ==
Despite the high-profile personnel and ambitious technology, PlayNet could not sustain the massive research, development, and infrastructure costs required to pioneer early internet kiosks. The promising hotel pilot programs stalled, and the company generated minimal revenue. According to a 1997 SEC filing, PlayNet Technologies reported only $819,894 in revenues for the period of 1990 through July 1997, alongside heavy net losses.

Unable to secure the necessary revenue to offset its mounting debts, PlayNet Technologies officially filed for Chapter 11 bankruptcy in 1998. The collapse became associated with scandal, ultimately foreshadowing Mouli Cohen's later prosecution.

In April 2012, Cohen was sentenced to 22 years in federal prison for defrauding investors out of over $30 million, having been convicted of 15 counts of wire fraud, 11 counts of money laundering, and three counts of tax evasion.
