= The Arc of Life =

- DVD cover
- Directed by: Jon Monday
- Produced by: Jon Monday
- Starring: Huston Smith; Ken Dychtwald
- Distributed by: mondayMEDIA
- Release date: January 21, 2012
- Running time: 80 minutes
- Country: United States
- Language: English

The Arc of Life (2012) is a film of an interview of world religion scholar Professor Huston Smith by Ken Dychtwald, a gerontologist and psychologist. The topics covered range from an overview of how societies from early human history to today deal with the problem of aging, to how the various religions of the world view the purpose of life, and what they teach about what happens after death.

== Background ==
Author and scholar Professor Huston Smith was an expert on the world's religion and was over 90 years old at the time of the interview. His first book, The World's Religions, has sold over two million copies and is still used as a text book in college courses. Ken Dychtwald is a gerontologist, psychologist, author, consultant, and professional speaker on the subject of aging. He has written 15 books, with an emphasis on the implications of the baby boomer generation approaching retirement age.

== Synopsis ==
Smith preempts the start of the interview by giving a summary of what he sees as the three inescapable problems that have faced humans from the earliest development of civilization: how to earn a living, how to get along with our fellow humans, and how to get along with our selves. He compares how the three enduring civilizations: East Asia (China), South Asia (India) and the West, have dealt with these problems in distinctive ways.

In Smith's view, the West has focused on nature, and developed science - but this puts the emphasis on the material world, including the body, which ages and deteriorates. He points out that the West has been very successful in providing livelihood, but tries to hide the fact of aging by using lovely metaphors of old age and such things as face lifts. The Western culture is youth oriented, and in Smith's opinion, fails to properly deal with the problems of aging.

Smith considers China, where he was born and raised, to be the world's sociologists, creating a society where the elderly are not only respected more as they grow older, but through extended family structures, are assisted by younger generations as one grows old.

Smith characterizes India as the world's psychologists - focusing on an individual's growth throughout their life in four stages: youth, family life, retirement - where a person seeks solitude to realize what life is all about, and the final stage of renunciation, where a person comes out of retirement to put into practice what they've learned.

After that overview, Dychtwald goes through a series of questions about what the various religions of the world say about aging and afterlife, as well as questioning Smith about his personal view of these topics. At 90+ years of age, Smith feels basically content with the "Arc" of his life, and when asked if he wanted to be young again, he answers with humor and emphasizes, "No! There's no reason to have three desserts" after dinner. He quotes from the bible, "Whatsoever condition I find myself, therein to be content".

Harry R. Moody, Ph.D., Director of Academic Affairs, AARP said of the film, "The Arc of Life DVD is a magnificent contribution to understanding of Huston Smith and his work."
