= World Religions (TV series) =

1973 television show

- Country of origin: Canada
- No. of episodes: 7

Original release
- Network: TVOntario
- Release: 1973

World Religions is an educational television show which was produced and broadcast by TVOntario (known at the time as the Ontario Educational Communications Authority) in 1973. The show was based on the theological book, The World's Religions, written by Huston Smith.

== Production ==
A total of seven episodes were created for the series, focusing on: Hinduism, Judaism, Christianity, Islam, Buddhism and "other eastern religions". The show centred on the modern-day religious practices of people in Ontario, filming regular members of the community for whom religion was important.

=== Episode list ===
- Episode 3 of the series looked at Christianity through the Madonna House Apostolate commune in Combermere.
