= The Roots of Fundamentalism =

- Film poster
- Directed by: Jon Monday
- Produced by: Jon Monday
- Starring: Huston Smith and Phil Cousineau
- Distributed by: mondayMEDIA on the GemsTone Label
- Release date: 2006
- Running time: 75 minutes
- Language: English

The Roots of Fundamentalism is a film of a discussion between world religion scholar Huston Smith and author, TV host, and film maker Phil Cousineau on the subject of Christian fundamentalism.

The modern emergence US Christian fundamentalism promoted Smith to speak out and write articles on the subject. He addresses many misconceptions about the origins, motives, and goals of the movement that is both sympathetic and critical.

The interview was also turned into an article for Parabola Magazine titled "Why Fundamentalism Matters". Smith was featured in their very first issue, and the publication also wanted to feature him in their 30th anniversary issue.
