= MusicWriter =

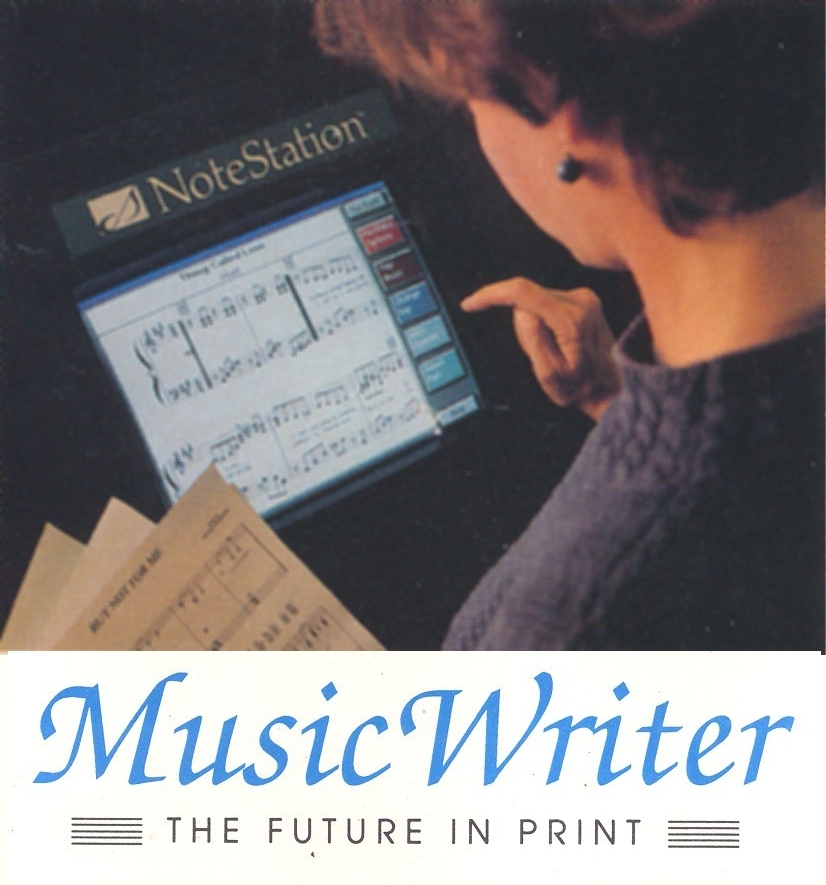
- Industry: Sheet Music and MIDI
- Founded: 1989
- Founder: Jon Monday and Lawrence Heller
- Headquarters: Los Gatos, CA, USA
- Area served: Global
- Products: NoteStation

MusicWriter was founded in 1989 by music industry veterans Jon Monday and Larry Heller to develop and market NoteStation, a kiosk-based retail "point-of-sale manufacturing" system for the distribution and printing of sheet music. Besides having a very large library of songs across all music genres, the NoteStation was able to print the sheet music on demand in any key, as selected by the customer. This reduced the need for retailers to carry a large selection of physical inventory, which was usually only printed in one key.

Early in the MusicWriter's history Warner Bros. Music and Thorn EMI, the two largest music publishers in the world, invested in the company and became board members. The company then was able to sign most of the major music publishers to offer their titles through the system.

MusicWriter was among the first applications of the new distribution paradigm of "Mass Customization" or "Point-of-Sale Manufacturing", where a retailer is able to offer a very large selection of a product, with virtually no inventory, and manufacture the customized product on the spot for a customer. This trend was documented in B. Joseph Pine II’s 1993 book, Mass Customization, The New Frontier in Business Competition published by Harvard Business School Press.

The company expanded its features to include producing MIDI files on demand and online ordering of music products from distributors.

The company was featured on CNN TV and written about in Fortune Magazine, Business Week, USA Today, San Francisco Examiner, San Jose Mercury News, and Popular Science.

Due to the major print music companies that fought against the technologies, in 1999 MusicWriter went bankrupt as online technology emerged and the decline of sheet music retailers made the in-store technology obsolete. However, years later online versions of the technology were introduced by other companies, such as SheetMusicDirect.com, MusicNotes.com, and SheetMusicPlus.com.
