= The Last Straw (2008 film) =

- Film poster
- Directed by: Jon Monday
- Produced by: Jon Monday
- Starring: Charles Bukowski
- Distributed by: mondayMEDIA
- Release date: 2008
- Running time: 74 minutes
- Country: United States
- Language: English

The Last Straw is a film documenting the last live poetry reading given by Charles Bukowski, even though he lived and wrote for another 14 years. The reading was given at The Sweetwater, a music club in Redondo Beach, California on March 31, 1980. The film was produced and directed by Jon Monday for mondayMEDIA and released in 2008.

== Context and content ==
In March 1980, Takoma Records was about to re-release an audio recording on vinyl of a Charles Bukowski live poetry reading given in San Francisco years earlier. As part of the promotion of the album release, Bukowski agreed to give a new live reading, even though he hated doing them. (Note: Bukowski frequently wrote about the torture of giving readings in his own poems, viewing them as a necessary evil for rent money. From his poem "The Poetry Reading": "sober / the sweat running down my arms / a spot of sweat on the table / I flatten it with my finger / blood money blood money / my god they must think I love this / like the others / but it’s for bread and beer and rent." From a letter to a friend regarding a reading (1970s): "The crowd was large and hostile. I was drunk and hostile... I insulted them, they insulted me. It was a good night.") Jon Monday, then General Manager of Takoma Records, video taped the event.

By later that year Bukowski's book royalties and movie advances provided him enough of a living that he no longer had to do readings.

The Redondo Beach reading was Bukowski's last. The video recording of that night stayed in an archive until 2008 when mondayMEDIA entered into an agreement with Bukowski's widow Linda to release it on DVD.

Bukowski's readings were known for their riotous back and forth with the audience and this recording shows this. Each poem is set between a tense dialog - with Bukowski giving and taking insults and threats with members of the audience. It ends with the statement: "This reading is over."

The Last Straw was edited to avoid duplicating of poems on the 2nd to the last reading, There's Gonna Be a God Damn Riot in Here DVD. The complete video of both readings can be found in the box set released in 2010, One Tough Mother.

The audio content had been released in 1985 as an LP under the title Hostage.
