= Ecast, Inc. =

Defunct American media company

- Type: Private
- Industry: Internet
- Founded: 1999
- Defunct: March 1, 2012
- Fate: Dissolved
- Headquarters: San Francisco, California, United States
- Area served: United States
- Key people: John Taylor President and CEO Samuel "Mouli" Cohen Co-founder
- Products: SmartSolution, SmartMall, SmartTransit, SmartConcierge, & Jukebox
- Services: Place-based interactive media
- Revenue: US$7,000,000
- Number of employees: 81
- Website: ecastinc.com

Ecast, Inc. was a privately held, venture capital–backed place-based interactive media company that offered advertising, digital music, games, entertainment, and information to bars and nightclubs in the United States. The company was founded in 1999 and was headquartered in San Francisco, California. Ecast, Inc. ceased operations when it closed its Jukebox network on March 1, 2012.

== Services ==
Its hospitality network delivered digital music, way finding, coupons, social media, third party content, and advertising options to more than 10,000 venues at its peak, including bars, nightclubs, taverns, resorts, hotels, restaurants, retail stores, event pavilions, and arenas.

=== SmartSolution ===
Touchscreen software that served advertising and social media impressions, as well as direct marketing associations operating on 3rd party hardware platforms.

=== SmartMall ===
An interactive media service that provided shopping customers with up-to-date information on the latest style and trends with editorialized content and coupons/offers.

=== SmartTransit ===
An advertising and content service that connected users to advertisers.

=== SmartConcierge ===
System that displays interactive images/movies showcasing the amenities of a client's hotel/resort.

=== Jukebox ===
An interactive place-based broadband enabled interactive media service for the bar and nightclub market.

== History ==
The company was founded in 1999 and was headquartered in San Francisco, California.

Ecast merged with RioPort in October 2002. Rioport was a digital music download service precursor to iTunes and was the first service to sign digital download agreements with all 5 of the major music labels.

Ecast, Inc. ceased operations when it closed its Jukebox network on March 1, 2012. The company's board of directors voted for an immediate shutdown after the company failed to raise enough capital to continue operating. Ecast's phones and email were turned off shortly after. AMI Entertainment Network Inc. and TouchTunes Interactive Networks indicated they would accommodate customers no longer able to access the company's services.

== Controversies ==
=== TouchTunes patent dispute ===
In late 2001, Ecast filed a lawsuit against TouchTunes Music Corporation claiming the company resorted to unfair trade practices by notifying Ecast and its customers that they were infringing TouchTunes' patent.

On October 15, 2003, Ecast voluntarily dismissed its own claims against TouchTunes for interference with contracts and unfair competition. In January 2004, TouchTunes filed a counterclaim that Ecast infringed on their patent rights by incorporating Touchtunes’ technology into their systems.

Ecast also had a separate patent infringement case against TouchTunes, charging the company with infringement by selling its jukeboxes within the U.S.

Ultimately TouchTunes and Ecast agreed to cross-license TouchTunes' U.S. Patent No. 6,308,204 and Ecast's U.S. Patent No. 5,341,350, which it licensed from NSM Music Group Limited.

=== Civil antitrust action ===
In September 2005, the Attorney General of the United States filed a civil antitrust action against Ecast, Inc. and NSM Music Group, Ltd. The lawsuit alleged that a February 2003 agreement between the companies was in violation of Section 1 of the Sherman Antitrust Act. Specifically that the negotiations which eventually led to NSM Music Group manufacturing Ecast's hardware, after their previous manufacturer terminated the supply agreement, included an agreement by NSM to abandon its plans to enter the U.S. market in return for an upfront payment by Ecast. The Attorney General contended that NSM's agreement caused them to abandon their plan to incorporate their own distinctive digital jukebox platform into their physical jukeboxes and enter the United States market.

The Department of Justice simultaneously announced alongside the lawsuit that it had reached a settlement with NSM and Ecast under which the two companies terminated their non-compete agreement.

=== Samuel "Mouli" Cohen ===
In 2009, Ecast co-founder and one-time CEO and Executive Chairman, Samuel "Mouli" Cohen defrauded 55 investors, including actor Danny Glover and the Vanguard Public Foundation, of more than $28 million and two lawsuits were filed. Cohen told investors that Ecast, Inc. was about to be acquired by Microsoft. Based on those false representations, victims purchased some of Cohen's founders’ shares in Ecast.

A federal grand jury in 2010 indicted Cohen on 32 felony counts of fraud and money laundering and was arrested in August 2010. In November 2011, Cohen was found guilty of 15 counts of wire fraud, 11 counts of money laundering, and three counts of tax evasion. He was acquitted of six additional charges. At the courthouse, he was taken into custody.

== See also ==
- Samuel "Mouli" Cohen
