= Gospel Nights =

1980 album by Maria Muldaur

Live album by Maria Muldaur
- Released: 1980
- Recorded: McCabe's Guitar Shop via Takoma Studios, 1979
- Venue: McCabe's Guitar Shop
- Studio: Takoma Studios
- Genre: Gospel
- Label: Takoma Records
- Producer: Jon Monday, Maria Muldaur

Gospel Nights is a live album by American singer Maria Muldaur. It was recorded in 1980 at McCabe's Guitar Shop in Santa Monica. It was originally released on the Takoma Records label. Maria was joined by the Chambers Brothers, The Burns Sisters, and friends.

Muldaur had been a staple on the folk circuit in the 1960s, originally with the Jim Kweskin & the Jug Band. She married fellow Jug Band member Geoff Muldaur, and after the Kweskin group broke up and after two albums with Geoff, she went solo and had a hit on Warner Bros. with "Midnight at the Oasis" in 1973. In 1979, her daughter sustained serious injuries in a car crash, which led to a religious awakening:

Coinciding with the termination of her agreement with Warner, her daughter Jenni had been in a severe car crash in the fall of 1979, sustaining critical head injuries that required surgery. As Muldaur waited at the hospital during her daughter’s surgery, the lyrics to her friend Bob Dylan’s recently released gospel album, Slow Train Coming, played in her mind. "My relationship with God hadn’t been that solid, but I found myself praying. I hadn’t prayed since I was a child. I guess the Lord answered my prayers. The operation was successful and my daughter lived."

Shortly afterwards, during performances in Southern California, she was invited to a Black Gospel church and had a spiritual experience, "That her conversion experience occurred by way of the Black church sets Muldaur apart from the droves of entertainers who were embracing Christianity" at the time.

Muldaur had always performed gospel music, and connected with fellow Christian, T Bone Burnett to perform a catalog of gospel styles at a concert at McCabe's Guitar Shop. Burnett recruited fellow Alpha Band members Steven Soles and David Mansfield to help with backing, and Maria brought in old friends The Burns Sisters and the Chambers Brothers to help with vocals.

== Track listing ==
1. "Brothers And Sisters"
2. "My Jesus Is All"
3. "Trials, Troubles, Tribulations"
4. "Bright Morning Star"
5. "Daniel Prayed"
6. "Nobody's Fault But Mine"
7. "Just Like An Eagle"
8. "Did You Remember"
9. "Traveling Shoes"
10. "People Get Ready"
11. "Said I Wasn't Going To Tell No One"
12. "Guide Me, O Great Jehovah"

== Personnel ==
- Maria Muldaur – vocals, co-producer
- The Chambers Brothers – vocals
- The Burns Sisters – vocals
- Ron Tutt – drums
- Steven Soles – acoustic and electric guitar
- Stephen Bruton – electric guitar
- David Mansfield – electric guitar, fiddle, mandolin
- Leon Gaer – bass
- Jon Monday – co-producer
- T-Bone Burnett – liner notes
- John Van Hamersveld – art direction
- Ron Marks – engineer
