= Vanguard Public Foundation =

American social justice foundation

- Founded: 1972
- Founder: Obie Benz and Peter Stern
- Dissolved: 2011
- Tax ID no.: 94-2369262
- Purpose: Social justice
- Location: San Francisco, California, U.S.
- Services: Grantmaking
- Website: www.vanguardsf.org at the Wayback Machine (archived May 13, 2009)

Vanguard Public Foundation was an American social justice foundation focused on providing grants to social justice nonprofits. One of the first of the "rich kid foundations," Vanguard was a model for a new generation's philanthropy. Vanguard rose as a leader among some two dozen new progressive foundations that comprised a network called the Funding Exchange. Vanguard closed down in 2011.

== History ==
The Vanguard Public Foundation established in 1972 by a group of inheritors of corporate fortunes, including Obie Benz, Peter Stern, Christine Russell, Maggie Roth, Penny Gerbode, and Daisy Paradis. They were later joined by over a hundred young inheritors who were devoted to supporting a progressive social and political agenda.

=== Closure ===
In 2002, Samuel "Mouli" Cohen was introduced to Vanguard CEO Hari Dillon by actor Danny Glover. Mouli said he would help the foundation by allowing Vanguard and its donors with buying shares in the privately owned Ecast, Inc. Dillon and Glover formed general partnerships through which they thought they had purchased several million dollars' worth of Ecast. At least three partnerships with Hari Dillon's Dillon Group, and an additional one with Glover, were used as vehicles to funnel investments from Vanguard Public Foundation donors to a deal with Mouli. The Vanguard donors ultimately put in over $20 million more in philanthropic money and personal investment cash.

Mouli stated that Ecast was to be acquired by Microsoft, which would then generate a significant return on investment, as high as 1000%. The Microsoft acquisition reportedly got delayed over EU rules, which generated a need for more fees to cover transaction costs. It was further delayed when reports that Ecast was considering a competing bid from Google. Ultimately, there was no Microsoft purchase, no Google bid, and the money was fraudulently taken by Cohen. Further, as reported by American Greed, a show on CNBC, Cohen had already been forced out of Ecast and was no longer affiliated with the company by the time he had become involved with Dillon.

Vanguard was forced to close in 2011 as a result of the fraud. Cohen and Dillon were later successfully prosecuted, with Dillon pleading guilty, for their role in the scandal.

== Grants ==
Vanguard's grant making put money into social movement causes, often before they became politically acceptable and often to organizations and actions that were never going to generate mainstream support. The Vanguard Public Foundation oversees four separate grant-making programs.

=== Social Justice Fund ===
Provided support to community-based organizations seeking to bring about progressive social change. The funding priorities focused on issues such as homelessness, civil rights, cultural activism, criminal justice, environmental justice, economic justice, human rights, immigration, and youth advocacy and leadership.

=== Community Institution Building Program ===
The Community Institution Building Program supported social justice organizations.

=== Technical Assistance & Capacity Building Program ===
Provided grant support, access to professional consultants, and skills workshops for community-based organizations that focused on environmental justice and other health-related problems in the Central Valley of California.

=== Social Justice Sabbatical Fund ===
Provided funding to community activists in order to enable them to take a 2-3 month break from their activities.

=== Grant recipients ===
Vanguard tended to focus on emerging projects which often went on to become more accepted by the public and therefore more fundable by other foundations. Donors also gave money to specific groups through Vanguard, enabling unincorporated groups to receive donations.

Among the groups that received Vanguard grants:

- American Civil Liberties Union
- American Friends Service Committee
- Agape Foundation
- Amnesty International
- Act Now to Stop War and End Racism (ANSWER)
- Art of the Matter Performance Foundation
- Astraea Lesbian Foundation for Justice
- Building Opportunities for Self Sufficiency
- Center for Constitutional Rights
- Center for Third World Organizing
- Centro Legal de La Raza
- Emilio Zapata Oakland Street Academy
- Greenpeace
- Free Mumia Abu-Jamal
- KPFA (Pacifica Network Free Speech Radio)
- National Immigration Project of the National Lawyers Guild
- Planned Parenthood Federation of America
- Rainforest Action Network
- School of Unity and Liberation (SOUL)
- Shefa Fund
- Sierra Club Foundation
- Solidarity Info Services
- Southern Poverty Law Center
- Tides Center
- Young Worker Project

=== Criticism of grants ===
Their focus on projects often before they became politically acceptable attracted negative attention from conservative pundits. Glenn Beck referred to Vanguard as "Marxist foundations of the 'social justice' movement" while Bill O'Reilly referred to the foundation as "pinheads".

== Influence on other foundations ==
In 1977, Vanguard published a book designed to serve a guide to other foundations, Robin Hood Was Right: A Guide to Giving Your Money for Social Change. The book was re-issued by the Funding Exchange in 2002.

Largely modeled on Vanguard are the Haymarket People's Fund in Boston, Massachusetts and the Liberty Hill Foundation in Santa Monica, California.

== See also ==
- Liberty Hill Foundation
