= There's Gonna Be a God Damn Riot in Here =

- Film poster
- Directed by: Jon Monday
- Produced by: Dennis Del Torre
- Starring: Charles Bukowski
- Distributed by: mondayMEDIA
- Release date: 2008
- Running time: 97 minutes
- Language: English

There's Gonna Be a God Damn Riot in Here is a film documenting the last live poetry reading given outside the US by Charles Bukowski, even though he lived and wrote for another 14 years. The reading was given at the Viking Inn, a small concert hall in Vancouver, British Columbia, Canada on October 12, 1979. It is produced by Dennis Del Torre and directed by Jon Monday for mondayMEDIA distribution.

== Plot ==
Dennis Del Torre was a fan of Bukowski and wanted to bring him to Vancouver for a reading. He wrote to Bukowski and Bukowski agreed, but with certain conditions, including that he receive a copy of any recording. Del Torre hired a video crew from the local college to video tape the event. The video tape was lost, but years later when John Dullaghan was working on his Bukowski documentary Born Into This, he discovered a copy of the tape at the home of the widow Linda Bukowski. The video was restored and a deal was made with Bukowski's widow and mondayMEDIA to turn it into a DVD and distribute it. It was Bukowski's penultimate live reading.

By 1980 Bukowski's book royalties and movie advances provided him enough of a living that he no longer had to do readings.

Bukowski's readings were known for their riotous back and forth with the audience and this recording shows this– with Bukowski giving and taking insults and threats with members of the audience. It ends with the statement that "I'll never do another of these readings", but he did one more in California in March 1980, documented on the 2008 DVD The Last Straw.

There's Gonna Be a God Damn Riot in Here was edited to avoid duplicating of poems on the last Bukowski reading, The Last Straw DVD. The complete video of both readings can be found in the box set released in 2010, One Tough Mother.
