= UWink =

American digital entertainment company

uWink, Inc.
- Company type: Public
- Traded as: Nasdaq: UWKI
- Industry: Entertainment; Dining
- Founded: 2000; 25 years ago
- Founder: Nolan Bushnell
- Defunct: 2010; 15 years ago
- Headquarters: Los Angeles, California, United States
- Number of locations: 3 (2008)
- Area served: California

uWink, Inc. (stock symbol: UWKI) was a publicly traded digital entertainment company based in Los Angeles, California. The company was founded in 2000 by Nolan Bushnell, the co-founder and former CEO of both Atari and Chuck E. Cheese. After little success developing interactive entertainment for restaurants, bars and mobile devices for several years in 2006 the company changed focus to their uWink Bistro concept, which it describes as an "entertainment dining experience which leverages its proprietary network and entertainment software, including the uWink Game Library".

uWink's stock opened at $4.75 on July 31, 2007. By December 2012 it was trading at less than one cent.

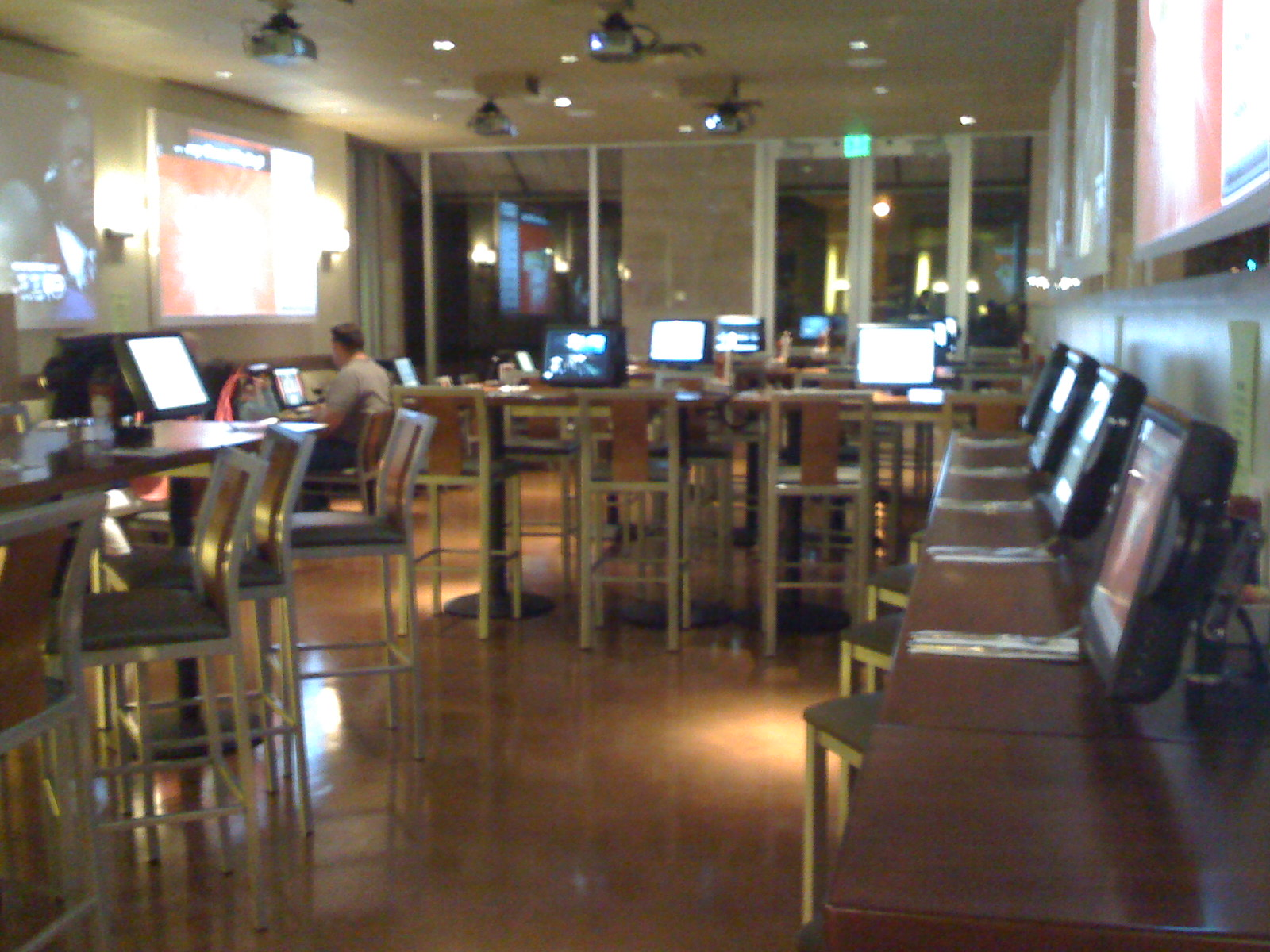
Interior of uWink Bistro in Mountain View, California.

== Locations, expansions, and closures ==
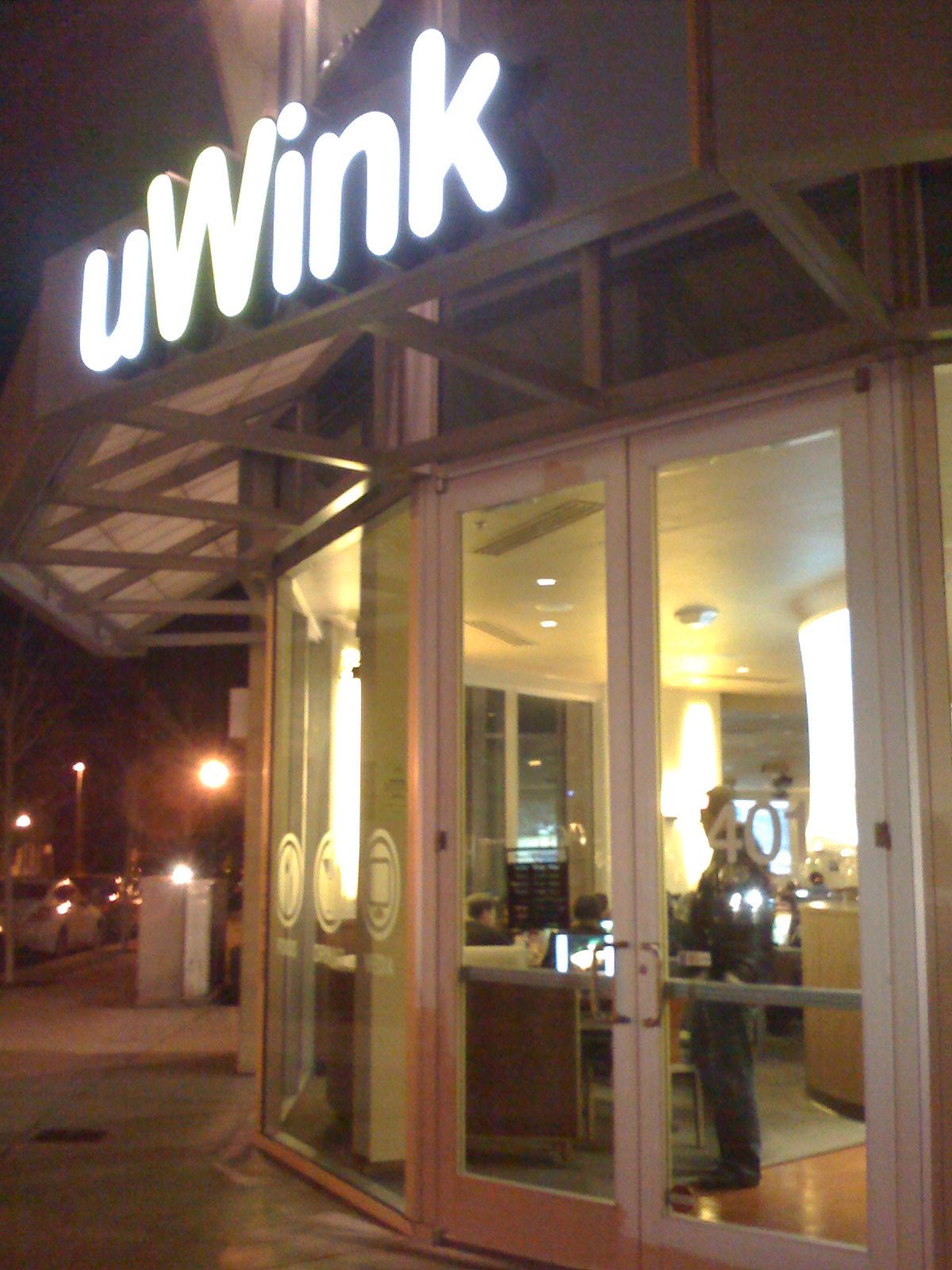
uWink Bistro in Mountain View, California.

- Woodland Hills, California, opened on October 16, 2006 in Westfield Promenade and closed in January, 2010. It received mixed to favorable reviews.
- Hollywood and Highland Center in Hollywood, California, opened on June 27, 2008 and closed on September 12, 2010.
- Mountain View, California, opened on September 15, 2008, closed April 21, 2009, in the Castro Street space formerly occupied by California Roadhouse.

On June 11, 2007, uWink announced its first franchise locations would be opened in the Miami, Florida area via an agreement with OCC Partners, LLC. Under the Area Development Agreement, up to three franchised uWink restaurants were expected to be built in the Miami-Dade County area over the next four years.

On June 25, 2007, uWink announced its first joint venture with venture capital firm Jefferson Partners to open uWink locations in Canada. Their first bistro was expected to open in Canada by early spring 2008.

During February, 2009, uWink delisted itself from the NASDAQ.

During April, 2009, uWink closed its third restaurant in Mountain View, California. uWink blamed the closure on the location's high rent and general difficulties in the American economy. Two restaurants in southern California remained open.

In January, 2010, uWink closed its first restaurant in Woodland Hills, California.

On September 12, 2010, uWink announced that they were closing all their stores and would be selling their computer services to other food establishments under the name Tapcode.

== Legacy ==
A uWink Eyecom, believed to be an unlaunched model, is held in the collection of The Centre for Computing History in Cambridge, UK.
