= Phil Cousineau =

American writer, academic and filmmaker

- Born: Philip Robert Cousineau; November 26, 1952 (age 73); Columbia, South Carolina, US
- Education: University of Detroit
- Occupations: Writer; lecturer; scholar; screenwriter; filmmaker
- Spouse: Jo Beaton
- Children: 1
- Website: www.philcousineau.net

Philip Robert Cousineau (born 1952) is an American author, lecturer, independent scholar, screenwriter, and documentary filmmaker. He lives in San Francisco, California.

== Early life and education ==
Phil Cousineau was born on 26 November 1952 in Columbia, South Carolina. He grew up Catholic just outside Detroit, with French Canadian roots. He studied journalism at the University of Detroit.

== Career ==
Before turning to writing books and films full-time, Cousineau's peripatetic career also included playing semi-professional basketball in Europe, harvesting date trees on an Israeli kibbutz, painting 44 Victorian houses (also known as Painted Ladies in San Francisco), teaching, and leading art and literary tours to Europe. He has worked as a sportswriter and taught screenwriting at the American Film Institute (AFI).

American mythologist Joseph Campbell was a mentor and major influence; Cousineau wrote the documentary film and companion book about Campbell's life, The Hero's Journey. The author of more than 25 nonfiction books, and contributed to magazine publications including Parabola, and Paris magazine. Cousineau has more than 15 documentary screenwriting credits to his name, including the 1991 Academy Award-nominated Forever Activists.

His best known works include Soul: An Archaeology, Readings from Socrates to Ray Charles, which Los Angeles Times columnist Jonathan Kirsch reviewed as "Inspiring, often mind-blowing, sometimes even a little scary," and the best-selling book, The Art of Pilgrimage: The Seeker's Guide to Making Travel Sacred.

Cousineau worked with religion scholar Huston Smith on three books as well as four documentary films on contemporary Native American issues. His books have been translated into nine languages.

Cousineau is the host and co-writer of the Link TV television series, Global Spirit, interviewing guests such as Robert Thurman, Karen Armstrong, Andrew Harvey, Deepak Chopra, and Joanne Shenandoah. The first season of Global Spirit was presented by John Cleese and broadcast on PBS-TV stations nationwide in the United States in 2012 and 2013.

A self-avowed night owl, Cousineau published Burning the Midnight Oil, a book of essays and poems about finding inspiration in the night, in 2013.

== Filmography ==
Filmography of Cousineau
Date	Title	Role	Production	Notes
1987	The Hero's Journey: The World of Joseph Campbell	screenwriter		Narrated by Peter Donat
1990	Forever Activists: Stories from the Abraham Lincoln Brigade	screenwriter		film by Connie Field and Judith Montell. Narrated by Ronnie Gilbert, nominated for an Academy Award Best Documentary, Features. (1990).
1992	Wiping the Tears of Seven Generations	screenwriter	Kifaru Production	
1993	The Presence of the Goddess	screenwriter		film by Christy Baldwin. Narrated by Isabel Allende
1995	The Red Road to Sobriety	screenwriter	Kifaru Production	Narrated by Benjamin Bratt, about the Native American Sobriety Movement.
1995	Ecological Design: Inventing the Future	screenwriter	Ecological Design Project production	Narrated by Linda Hunt, competed at Sundance Film Festival in 1995.
1996	The Peyote Road: Ancient Religion in Contemporary Crisis	screenwriter	Kifaru Production	Narrated by Peter Coyote.
1996	Your Humble Serpent: The Life of Reuben Snake	screenwriter	Kifaru Production	Awarded "Best Documentary", at Red Earth Film Festival
1999	Wayfinders: A Pacific Odyssey	screenwriter	Maiden Voyage Productions	PBS documentary, directed by Gail Evenari. Narrated by Napuanalani Cassidy and Patrick Stewart
2005	A Seat at the Table: Struggling for American Religious Freedom	screenwriter	Kifaru Production	Screened at the American Indian Film Festival, San Francisco in 2003.
2006	The Roots of Fundamentalism: A Conversation with Huston Smith and Phil Cousineau	self	GemsTone Production	

== Bibliography ==
- Cousineau, Phil (Dec 2013). Burning the Midnight Oil: Illuminating Words for the Long Night's Journey Into Day. Viva Editions. pp. 244 pages. ISBN 978-1-936-74073-4.
- Cousineau, Phil (Sep 2012). The Painted Word: A Treasure Chest of Remarkable Words and Their Origins. Gregg Chadwick (illus.). Viva Editions. p. 336. ISBN 978-1-936-74017-8.
- Smith, Huston; Phil Cousineau (Sep 2012). And Live Rejoicing: Chapters from a Charmed Life — Personal Encounters with Spiritual Mavericks, Remarkable Seekers, and the World's Great Religious Leaders. New World Library. pp. 248. ISBN 978-1-608-68071-9.
- Cousineau, Phil (February 2011). Beyond Forgiveness: Reflections on Atonement. Huston Smith (foreword). Jossey-Bass. p. 272. ISBN 978-0-470-90773-3.
- Cousineau, Phil (April 2010). Wordcatcher: An Odyssey into the World of Weird and Wonderful Words. Gregg Chadwick (illus.). Viva Editions. pp. 305. ISBN 978-1-57344-400-2.
- Cousineau, Phil (January 2010). The Oldest Story in the World. Sisyphus Press. p. 84. ISBN 978-0-9626548-9-3.
- Cousineau, Phil; Scott Chamberlin Hoyt (September 2009). The Meaning of Tea: A Tea Inspired Journey. Talking Leaves Press. p. 362. ISBN 978-0-615-20442-0.
- Cousineau, Phil (May 2008). Stoking the Creative Fires: 9 Ways to Rekindle Passion and Imagination. Conari Press. pp. 224. ISBN 978-1-57324-299-8.
- Smith, Huston; Cousineau, Phil (December 2005). A Seat at the Table: Huston Smith in Conversation with Native Americans on Religious Freedom. University of California Press. pp. 253. ISBN 978-0-520-24439-9.
- Cousineau, Phil (2004). The Blue Museum: Poems. Sisyphus Press. p. 152. ISBN 978-0-9626548-2-4.
- Cousineau, Phil (November 2003). The Olympic Odyssey: Rekindling the True Spirit of the Great Games. Quest Books. pp. 224. ISBN 978-0-8356-0833-6.
- Smith, Huston; Cousineau, Phil (September 2003). The Way Things Are: Conversations with Huston Smith on the Spiritual Life. University of California Press. pp. 338. ISBN 978-0-520-23816-9.
- Cousineau, Phil (October 2001). Coincidence Or Destiny? Stories of Synchronicity That Illuminate Our Lives. Wes Nisker (foreword). Red Wheel / Weiser. p. 224. ISBN 978-1-57324-712-2.
- Cousineau, Phil (May 2001). Once and Future Myths: The Power of Ancient Stories in Modern Time. Stephen Larsen (foreword). Conari Press. pp. 224. ISBN 978-1-57324-299-8.
- Cousineau, Phil (May 2000). The Book of Roads: Travel Stories. Sisyphus Press. p. 227. ISBN 978-0-9626548-1-7.
- Cousineau, Phil (November 2000). The Soul Aflame: A Modern Book of Hours. Robert A. Johnson (foreword); Eric Lawton (photography). Conari Press. p. 224. ISBN 978-1-57324-509-8.
- Cousineau, Phil (June 1999). The Art of Pilgrimage: The Seeker's Guide to Making Travel Sacred. Conari Press. p. 288. ISBN 978-1-57324-593-7.
- Cousineau, Phil (June 2012). The Art of Pilgrimage: The Seeker's Guide to Making Travel Sacred. Red Wheel/Weiser/Conari; Anniversary Edition. ISBN 978-1-57324-080-2.
- Cousineau, Phil (February 1994). Soul: An Archaeology: From Socrates to Ray Charles. HarperCollins Publishers. pp. 249. ISBN 978-0-06-250239-1.
- Cousineau, Phil (February 1993). The Soul of the World: A Modern Book of Hours. Eric Lawton (photography). HarperCollins Publishers. pp. 249. ISBN 978-0-06-250239-1.
- Cousineau, Phil (September 1991). Deadlines: A Rhapsody on a Theme of Famous and Infamous Last Words. Sisyphus Press. p. 121. ISBN 978-0-9626548-0-0.
- Densmore, John; Phil Cousineau (August 1990). Riders on the Storm: My Life with Jim Morrison and The Doors. Delacorte Press. p. 319. ISBN 978-0-385-30033-9.
- Cousineau, Phil (August 2014). The Hero's Journey: Joseph Campbell on His Life and Work. The Collected Works of Joseph Campbell. Stuart L. Brown (foreword). New World Library; Third Edition paperback. p. 336. ISBN 978-1-60868-189-1.
- Cousineau, Phil (August 2003). The Hero's Journey: Joseph Campbell on His Life and Work, Centennial Edition. Stuart L. Brown (foreword). New World Library. p. 288. ISBN 978-1-57731-404-2.
- Cousineau, Phil (May 1990). The Hero's Journey: Joseph Campbell on His Life and Work. Stuart L. Brown (foreword). Harper & Row. p. 255. ISBN 0-06-250102-X.
