= McCabe Creek =

McCabe Creek may refer to:

- McCabe Creek (Missouri)
- McCabe Creek (Yukon)
- McCabe Creek, Yukon, a locality in Yukon
