= Nolan Bushnell =

American businessman and engineer (born 1943)

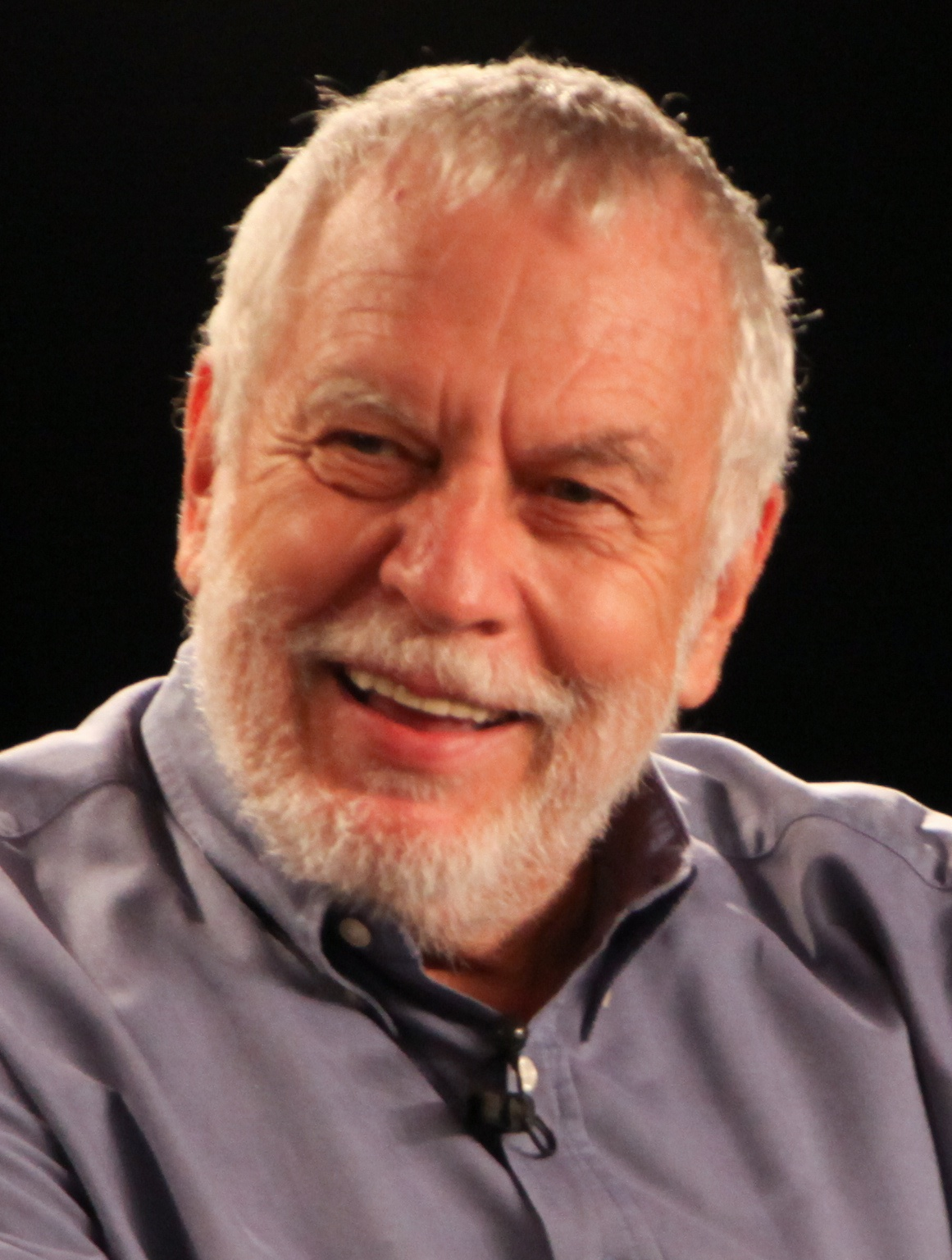
- Bushnell in 2013
- Born: Nolan Kay Bushnell; February 5, 1943 (age 83); Ogden, Utah, U.S.
- Education: Utah State University (attended); University of Utah; Stanford Business School
- Known for: Co-founding Atari, Inc. Pong; Creator & founder of Chuck E. Cheese
- Awards: Video Game Hall of Fame; Consumer Electronics Association Hall of Fame
- Scientific career
- Fields: Electrical engineering Computer software

Nolan Kay Bushnell (born February 5, 1943) is an American businessman and electrical engineer. He established Atari, Inc., and the Chuck E. Cheese chain. He has been inducted into the Video Game Hall of Fame and the Consumer Electronics Association Hall of Fame, received the BAFTA Fellowship and the Nations Restaurant News "Innovator of the Year" award and was named one of Newsweek's "50 Men Who Changed America". He has started more than 20 companies and is one of the founding fathers of the video game industry. He is on the board of Anti-Aging Games. In 2012, he founded an educational software company called Brainrush that uses video game technology in educational software.

He is credited with Bushnell's Law, an aphorism about games that are "easy to learn and difficult to master" being rewarding.

== Personal life ==
Bushnell was born on February 5, 1943 in Ogden, Utah, but grew up in Clearfield, Utah in a middle-class family who were members of the Church of Jesus Christ of Latter-day Saints. He attended Davis High School in the nearby town of Kaysville, Utah. Bushnell enrolled at Utah State University in 1961 to study engineering and then later business. In 1964, he transferred to the University of Utah College of Engineering, where he graduated with a bachelor's degree in electrical engineering. He was a member of the Pi Kappa Alpha fraternity.

He married his first wife, Paula Rochelle Nielson, in 1966 and had two daughters. In 1969, they moved to California. They divorced in 1975 just prior to Warner Communication's purchase of Atari. Near the end of 1977, he married Nancy Nino, with whom he had six children. He also used his profit from selling Atari to Warner to purchase the former mansion of coffee magnate James Folger in Woodside, California.

Although he was a Latter-day Saint in his youth, by the time of his first divorce he had forgone the teachings, often being called a "lapsed Mormon". He said that he stopped practicing the faith after he got into a debate over the interpretation of the Bible with a professor at the University of Utah's Institute of Religion while in college.

== Business career ==
=== Early career and Syzygy ===
Bushnell worked at Lagoon Amusement Park for many years while attending college. He was made manager of the games department two seasons after starting. While working there, he became familiar with arcade electro-mechanical games, watching customers play and helping to maintain the machinery while learning how it worked, developing his understanding of how the game business operates. He was also interested in the Midway arcade games, where theme park customers would have to use skill and luck to ultimately achieve the goal and win the prize. He liked the concept of getting people curious about the game and from there getting them to pay the fee in order to play.

While in college, he worked for several employers, including Litton Guidance and Control Systems, Hadley Ltd, and the industrial engineering department at the U of U. For several summers, he built his own advertising company, Campus Company, which produced blotters for four universities and sold advertising space around a calendar of events. He also sold copies of Encyclopedia Americana.

After graduating, Bushnell moved to California from Utah hoping to be hired by Disney, but the company did not routinely hire fresh college graduates. Instead, Bushnell got a job as an electrical engineer with Ampex. At Ampex, he met fellow employee Ted Dabney and found they had common interests. Bushnell shared his ideas of creating pizza parlors filled with electronic games with Dabney, and took Dabney to the computing labs at Stanford Artificial Intelligence Laboratory to show him Spacewar!.

In 1970, Bushnell and Dabney formed Syzygy with the intention of producing a Spacewar! clone known as Computer Space. They made an agreement with Nutting Associates, a maker of coin-op trivia and shooting games, that produced a fiberglass cabinet for the unit that included a coin-slot mechanism.

Computer Space was a commercial failure, though sales exceeded $3 million. Bushnell felt that Nutting Associates had not marketed the game well, and decided that his next game would be licensed to a bigger manufacturer. Bushnell also knew that the next game they developed would need to be simpler and not require users to read instructions on the cabinet, since their target audience would likely be drunken bar patrons.

=== Atari, Inc. ===
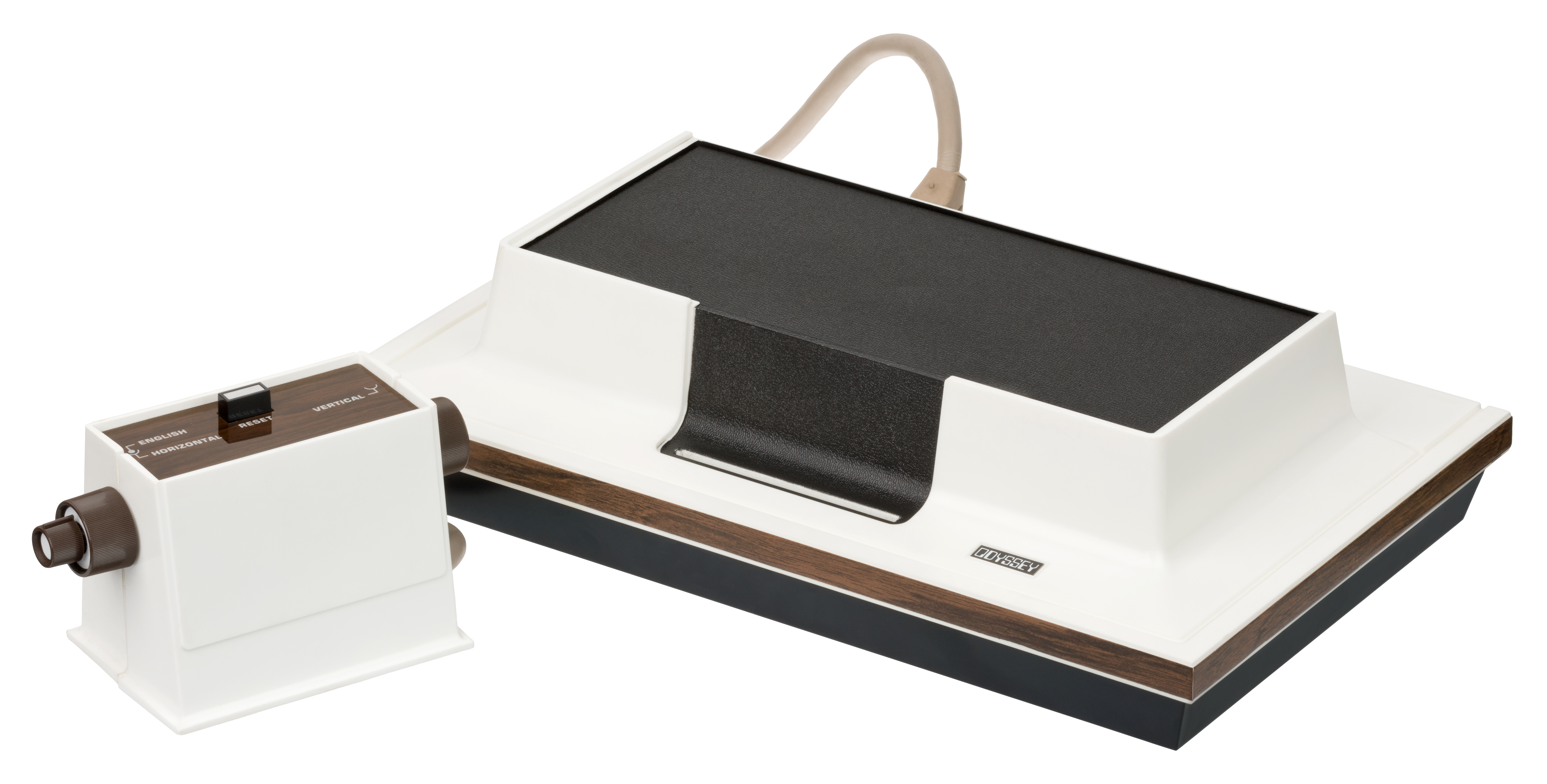
The Magnavox Odyssey provided the inspiration for Bushnell's successful Pong.

In 1972, Bushnell and Dabney set off on their own, and learned that the name "Syzygy" was in use; Bushnell has said at different times that it was in use by a candle company owned by a Mendocino hippie commune and by a roofing company. They instead incorporated under the name Atari, a reference to a check-like position in the game Go (which Bushnell has called his "favorite game of all time").

They rented their first office on Scott Boulevard in Santa Clara, California, contracted with Bally Manufacturing to create a video game and a pinball table, and hired their second employee, engineer Allan Alcorn. Bushnell pitched Bally on a hockey video game.

After Bushnell attended a Burlingame, California demonstration of the Magnavox Odyssey, he gave the task of making a similar product to the Magnavox table tennis game to Alcorn as a test project. He told Alcorn that he was making the game as a consumer product for General Electric, in order to motivate him. Alcorn incorporated many of his own improvements into the game design, such as the ball speeding up the longer the game went on, and Pong was born. Pong proved to be very popular; Atari released a large number of Pong-based arcade video games over the next few years as the mainstay of the company. After the release of Pong, Bushnell and Dabney had a falling-out: Dabney felt he was being pushed to the side by Bushnell, while Bushnell felt Dabney was holding back the company from larger financial success. Bushnell purchased Dabney's share of Atari for $250,000 in 1973.

To get more arcade games to market and bypass exclusivity limitations that coin-op game distributors had set, Bushnell discreetly had his neighbor Joe Keenan establish Kee Games in 1973 to manufacture near-copies of Atari's games. Even with Kee's output, Atari had difficulty meeting demand for arcade games, and by 1974 Atari was facing financial hardships in part due to the competition in the arcade game market. Bushnell opted to merge Kee Games into Atari in September 1974 just ahead of the release of Tank, a wholly original arcade game from Kee. Tank was an arcade success and helped bolster Atari's finances. Keenan became president of Atari and managed its operations while Bushnell retained his CEO role.

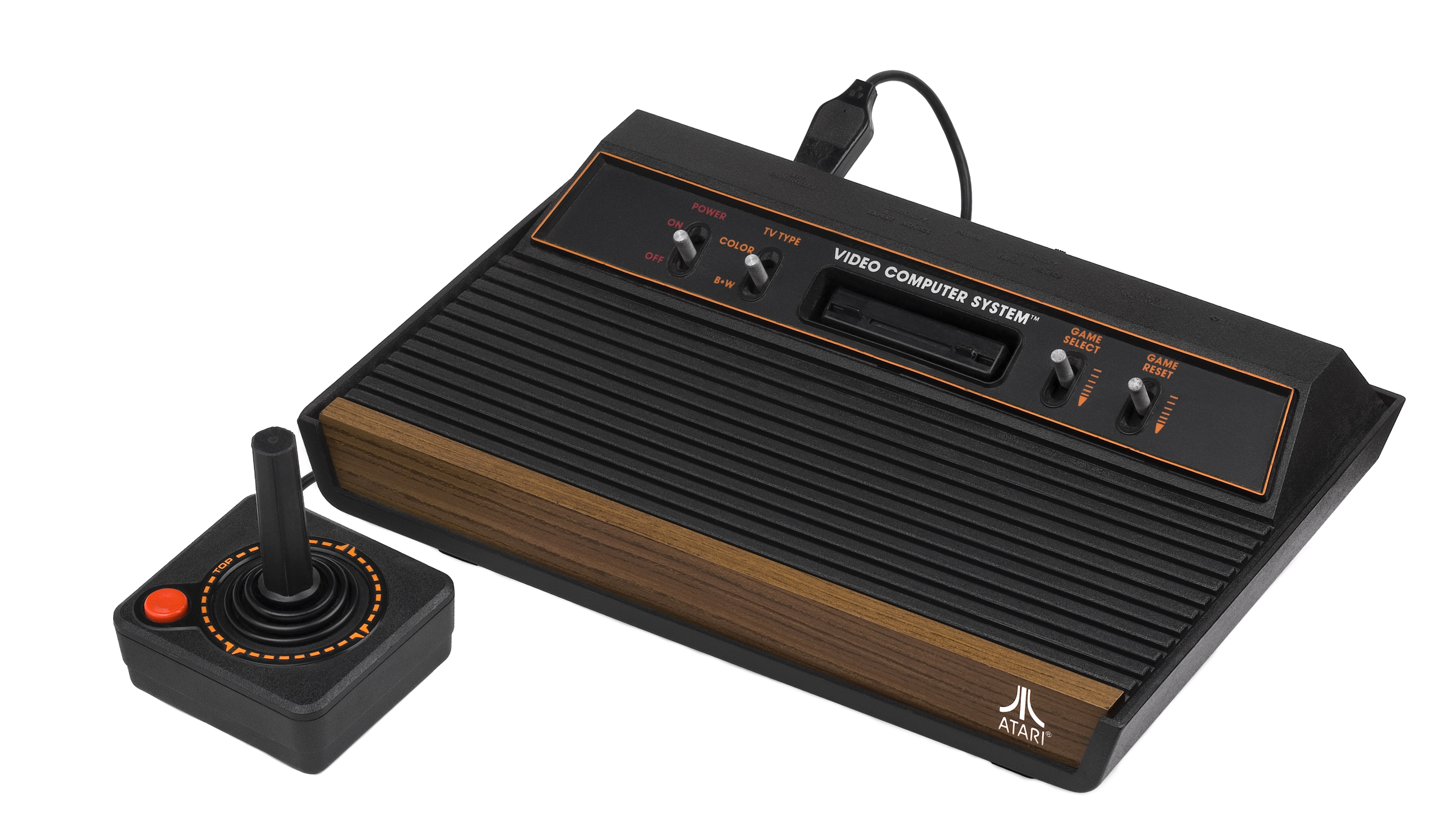
The Atari 2600 would go on to revolutionize the home gaming market, but Bushnell was forced out of Atari not long after its release.

With the company financially stable, Atari entered the consumer electronics market, with its home Pong consoles first released in 1975. Atari continued to make variants of its existing arcade games for dedicated home consoles until 1977. During this period, former Atari employees Steve Jobs and Steve Wozniak had approached Bushnell about investing in their home computer system, the Apple I, that was built from borrowed parts from Atari and with technical support from Atari employees. They initially offered the design to Bushnell and Atari, but Bushnell wanted Atari to focus on arcade and home consoles. Later in 1975, Jobs offered Bushnell a chance for one-third equity stake in their budding company Apple Inc., for $50,000; Bushnell remarked in hindsight, "I was so smart, I said no. It's kind of fun to think about that, when I'm not crying." Bushnell also established the first Pizza Time Theatre in San Jose in 1977 as a means for Atari to stock its arcade games.

As Atari faced more competition in both arcade and home consoles from 1975 onward, Bushnell recognized that the costs in developing both types of systems with only limited shelf life were too high, and directed Atari's engineers at Cyan Engineering towards a programmable home console. This console eventually was released in 1977 as the Atari Video Computer System or Atari VCS and later known as the Atari 2600. However, before Atari had completed its design, the Fairchild Channel F, the first home console to use game cartridges, was released in November 1976. Bushnell realized they needed to speed up the Atari VCS's development. After initially considering to become a public company, he instead sought a buyer. Warner Communications, looking to boost their own failing media properties, agreed to acquire Atari for $28 million, with Bushnell personally receiving US$15 million, in November 1976. Warner provided a large investment into the Atari VCS to allow it to be completed early the next year and released in September 1977.

The first year of Atari VCS sales were modest and limited by Atari's own supply. While many of the initial games were arcade conversions of Atari arcade games, the second wave of games were more abstract and difficult to promote. Warner placed Ray Kassar, a former vice president of Burlington Industries, to help with Atari's marketing. Kassar created successful advertising and marketing throughout 1978, positioning the Atari VCS for a larger sales period at the end of the year. However, Bushnell had concerns on Kassar's plans and feared they had produced too many units to be sold, and at a board meeting with Warner near the end of the year, reiterated this position. Bushnell recommended that funds be used in R&D for developing a new, technologically superior console, as he feared rising competition would make the aging tech specs of the VCS obsolete. Bushnell's concerns never materialized as a combination of Kassar's marketing and the popularity of Taito's Space Invaders at the arcade drove Atari VCS sales. Both Warner Communications and Bushnell commonly recognized he was no longer a good leader for the company, removing him as CEO and Chairman in early 1979. Warner offered Bushnell the opportunity to stay as a director and creative consultant, but Bushnell refused. Before leaving, Bushnell negotiated the rights to Pizza Time Theatre from Atari for $500,000. Keenan replaced Bushnell but left a few months later, with Kassar being named as Atari's CEO by mid-1979.

=== Chuck E. Cheese's Pizza Time Theatre ===
In 1978, while at Atari, Bushnell purchased Pizza Time Theatre back from Warner Communications. It had been created by Bushnell, originally as a place where kids could go and eat pizza and play video games, which would therefore function as a distribution channel for Atari games. Chuck E. Cheese's Pizza Time Theatre also had animatronic animals that played music as entertainment. It is known that Bushnell had always wanted to work for Walt Disney, but was continually turned down for employment when he was first starting out after graduation; Chuck E. Cheese was his homage to Disney and the technology developed there. In 1981 Bushnell turned over day-to-day food operations of Chuck E. Cheese's to a newly hired restaurant executive and focused on Catalyst Technologies.

Through 1981 and 1982, Bushnell concentrated on PTT subsidiaries Sente Technologies and Kadabrascope. Sente was a reentry into the coin-operated game business. Arcade cabinets would have a proprietary system with a cartridge slot so operators could refresh their games without having to buy whole new cabinets. Kadabrascope was an early attempt at computer assisted animation. In 1983 as the restaurants started to lose money, Sente, though profitable, was sold to Bally for $3.9 million and Kadabrascope was sold to Lucasfilm which became the beginnings of what became Pixar.

During this time Bushnell was using large loans on his Pizza Time stock to fund Catalyst. By the end of 1983, Chuck E. Cheese was having serious financial problems. President and long-time friend Joe Keenan resigned that fall. Nolan tried to step back in, blaming the money problems on over-expansion, too much tweaking of the formula and saturation in local markets by the management team. He resigned in February 1984, when the board of directors rejected his proposed changes, and Chuck E. Cheese's Pizza Time Theater (now named after its famous rat mascot) filed for Chapter 11 bankruptcy in March of 1984.

ShowBiz Pizza Place, a competing Pizza/Arcade family restaurant, then purchased Pizza Time Theatre in May 1985 and assumed its debt. The newly formed company, ShowBiz Pizza Time, Inc., operated restaurants under both brands before unifying all locations under the Chuck E. Cheese's Pizza brand by 1993. Today over 560 locations of this restaurant are in business.

=== Catalyst Technologies Venture Capital Group ===
Bushnell founded Catalyst Technologies, one of the earliest business incubators. The Catalyst Group companies numbered in the double digits and included Androbot, Etak, Cumma, and Axlon.

Axlon launched many consumer and consumer electronic products successfully, most notably AG Bear, a bear that mumbled/echoed a child's words back to it. In the late 1980s, Axlon managed the development of two new games for the Atari 2600, most likely as part of a marketing attempt to revive sales of the system, already more than a decade old. This included Motorodeo, a monster truck-themed games that was one of the last games developed for the Atari 2600 system, being released in 1990. The company was largely sold to Hasbro.

Etak, founded in 1984, was the first company to digitize the maps of the world, as part of the first commercial automotive navigation system; the maps ultimately provided the backbone for Google Maps, mapquest.com, and other navigation systems; it was sold to Rupert Murdoch in the 1980s. In May 2000 the company, headquartered in Menlo Park, California, became a wholly owned subsidiary of Tele Atlas.

While many of the ideas eventually led to current-day innovations, most of Catalyst's companies eventually failed due to a lack of underlying technology available in the 1980s to sustain these high-tech innovations. For example, Catalyst's companies included CinemaVision, which attempted to develop high-definition television. Cumma attempted to distribute video games using special vending machines that would write the game onto discs on demand. ByVideo developed an early online shopping experience using kiosks and Laser Discs that allowed shoppers to virtually purchase products that would then be delivered later.

=== PlayNet/Aristo ===
After a failed bid to purchase Atari Games in 1996, the company which carried on Atari's arcade legacy, Nolan Bushnell became senior consultant to the small game developer Aristo International after it bought Borta, Inc., where he was chairman. Aristo's CEO and chairman was Mouli Cohen. In association with Aristo, Bushnell spearheaded TeamNet, a line of multiplayer-only arcade machines targeted towards adults, which allowed teams of up to four players to compete either locally or remotely via internet. Aristo was later renamed PlayNet, which was developing two main products for the hospitality market: a coin-operated "Bar Top" touchscreen game machine that was Internet enabled; the other was an online jukebox, that had thousands of songs onboard but was also connected to a master library of song licensed from major record labels. Borta Inc. Developed video games that included versions of Urban Strike and Jungle Strike along with online Sports Games. Aristo developed two main products: a touchscreen interface bar-top/arcade system that would also provide internet access, phone calls, and online networked tournaments; and a digital jukebox, capable of storing thousands of songs and downloading new releases. By late 1997 the company was facing financial troubles and was planning to withdraw the units it had released in the field and relaunch the line with improvements to the credit card swipe system and internet connections. The company died shortly before the dot-com bubble burst with its prototype machines still in development in 1997.

=== uWink ===
Before BrainRush, Bushnell's most recent company was uWink, a company that evolved out of an early project called In10City (pronounced 'Intensity') which was a concept of an entertainment complex and dining experience. uWink was started by Bushnell and his business adviser Loni Reeder, who also designed the original logo for the company. The company has gone through several failed iterations including a touch-screen kiosk design, a company to run cash and prize awards as part of their uWin concept and also an online Entertainment Systems network. After nearly 7 years and over $24 million in investor funding, the touchscreen kiosks/bartop model was closed amid complaints of unpaid prizes and lack of maintaining service agreements with locations to keep the kiosk/bartop units in working condition. The latest iteration (announced in 2005) is a new interactive entertainment restaurant called the uWink Media Bistro, whose concept builds off his Chuck E. Cheese venture and previous 1988–1989 venture Bots Inc., which developed similar systems of customer-side point-of-sale touch-screen terminals in addition to autonomous pizza delivery robots for Little Caesars Pizza. The plan was for guests to order their food and drinks using screens at each table, on which they may also play games with each other and watch movie trailers and short videos. The multiplayer network type video games that allowed table to table interaction or even with table group play never materialized. Guests often spotted the OSX based machine being constantly re-booted in order to play much simpler casual video games. Another factor that possibly led to the failure of the restaurants was the placement of the restaurants. The Woodland Hills location was on the second floor of a suburban shopping mall and the Hollywood location practically hidden with minimal visibility on a higher level of a shopping center complex. The first Bistro opened in Woodland Hills, California on October 16, 2006. A second in Hollywood was established, and in 2008 the company opened a third Southern California restaurant and one in Mountain View, California. All the restaurants have since closed.

=== Atari, SA ===
On April 19, 2010, Atari SA, the owner of the Atari brand and its home legacy since 2001, announced that Nolan Bushnell would join the company's board of directors. It marked his de facto return to Atari after more than 30 years.

=== Modal VR ===
Bushnell is also one of the founders of Modal VR, a company that develops a portable large-scale VR system for enterprises to train e.g., security forces.

=== Anti-Aging Games, LLC ===
Nolan is on the advisory board of Anti-AgingGames.com and was a co-founder of the company, featuring online memory, concentration, and focus games for healthy people over 35.

=== BrainRush ===
BrainRush is a company that uses video game technology in educational software where he is Founder, CEO and chairman. The company was venture capital funded in 2012. It is based on the idea that many curriculum lessons can be turned into mini-games. Developers can take any body of knowledge from English language arts to foreign language, geography, multiplication table or chemistry tables, to parts of the human body and gamify the experience. BrainRush calls their underlying technology "Adaptive Practice." They have also developed an open-authoring system allowing users to quickly create games in different topic areas.

Between 2010 and 2012, BrainRush ran a test in Spanish language vocabulary learning with over 2200 teachers and 80,000 students across the country and got an increase in learning speed of between 8–10 times traditional learning. BrainRush rolled out the full platform in the fall of 2013.

=== Global Gaming Technologies Corp (CSE – GGAM.U) ===
On March 6, 2019, Nolan was appointed CEO and Chairman of publicly traded company Global Gaming Technologies Corp.

=== Exodexa, Inc. ===
In 2021, Nolan founded the ExoDexa gaming platform that intends to deliver individualized, interactive learning experiences across chemistry, physics, business law, and history using adaptive learning, with more than 4,000 lessons in development. ExoDexa's platform is adaptable to different languages, topics and content types, seeking to redefine learning success for students and provide teachers with better tools.

== Other ventures ==
- In 1981, Bushnell created the TimberTech Computer Camp in Scotts Valley, California.
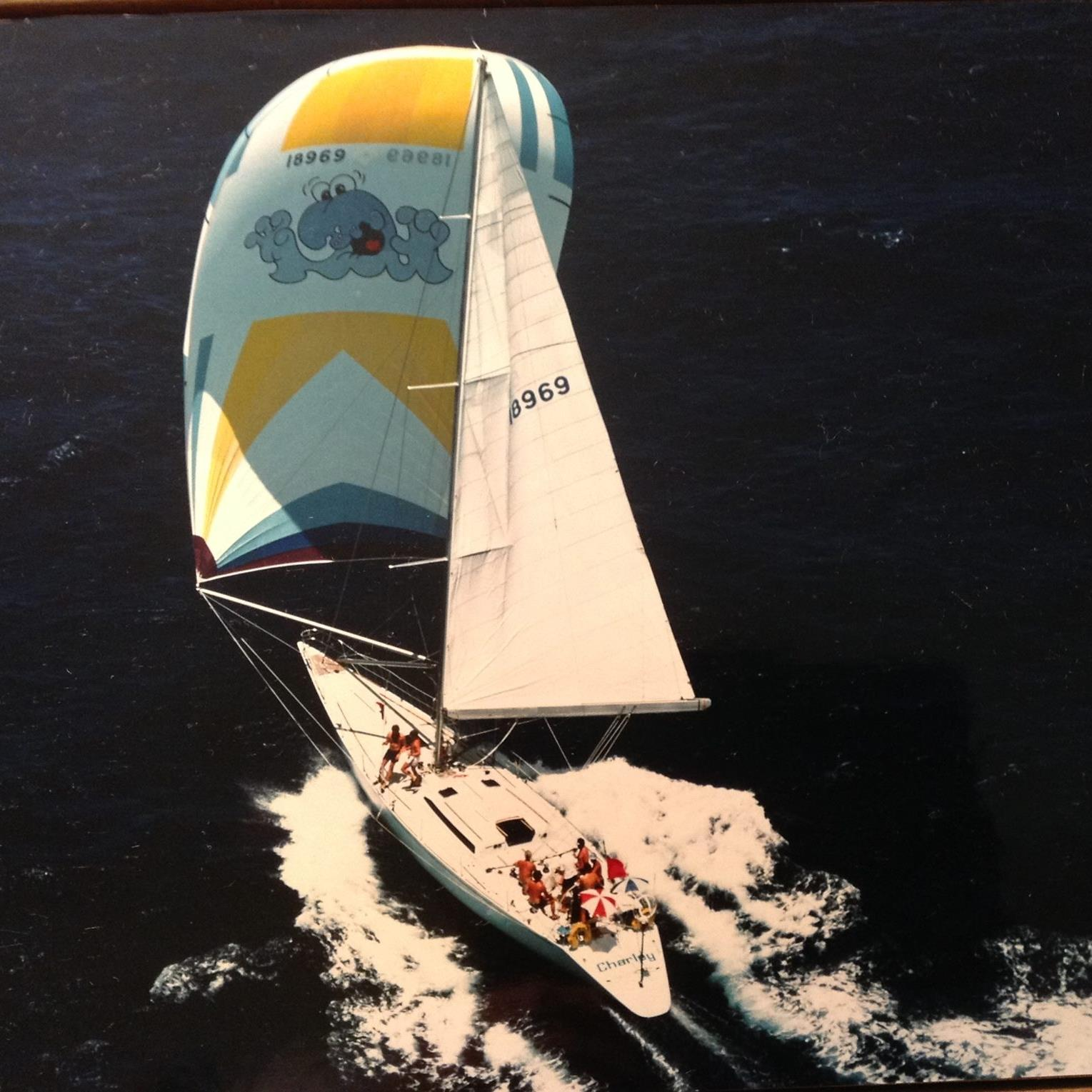
- Nolan Bushnell's 67ft boat Charley (Ron Holland design, 1983)
  In 1982, Bushnell commissioned Charley, a 67-foot racing yacht designed by Ron Holland. Charley went on to win Line honours in the 1983 TransPacific Yacht Race.
- In 1983, Bushnell introduced the first "Androbot" TOPO. It was shown at the First Annual Consumer Robotics Show in Albuquerque, NM.
- In 1984, Bushnell purchased the arcade game company Videa and renamed it Sente Games. Among the games developed by the company before it closed in 1987 included the hockey video game Hat Trick.
- In 1991, Bushnell endorsed the Commodore International CDTV, a CD-ROM-based version of the Amiga 500 computer repackaged for the consumer electronics market.
- In Summer 1995 Bushnell announced a new line of amusement centers called E2000, which would be similar to Chuck E. Cheese's, but based on a video game theme. However, an unrelated multimillion-dollar lawsuit filed against Bushnell by Merrill Lynch prompted most of E2000's investors to back out, leaving him unable to fund the project.
- In June 1999, Bushnell joined the board of directors of Wave Systems Corp.
- In 2005, he served as a judge on the USA Network reality series Made in the USA.
- In 2007, Bushnell joined the board of NeoEdge Networks as chairman.
- In 2007, Bushnell joined the advisory board of GAMEWAGER.
- In 2008, Bushnell became a member of AirPatrol Corporation's board of directors.
- In 2009, Bushnell announced his intention to move into the game-education market with a venture called Snap. He also announced that he would make an appearance at SGC, a gaming convention organized by ScrewAttack.
- In May 2016, Bushnell joined the board of directors of MGT Capital Investments. John McAfee, proposed Executive Chairman and chief executive officer of MGT Capital, stated, "Nolan is one of the brightest minds in cyber technology. In his career, he has founded more than 20 high tech companies, giving him unprecedented knowledge of the tech industry. As a director, he will help MGT identify and cultivate the necessary strategic partnerships to position the company as the world leader in cyber security."
- In 2016, Bushnell co-founded Black Sheep Ventures Ltd, a private equity firm with Ronald Bauer. The firm operated from 2016 to 2022.
- In January 2017, Bushnell joined the board of directors of Perrone Robotics, a maker of robotics software platforms for autonomous vehicles and mobile robots.
- In March 2021, Bushnell co-founded Moxy.io, a blockchain powered esport competition, tournament, and event platform.

== Media appearances ==
Bushnell was featured in the documentary film Something Ventured about venture capital development, as well as Atari: Game Over, which documented the unearthing of the Atari video game burial. He was also featured in animated TV show Code Monkeys in Episode 3 of Season 1. For the 50th anniversary of Atari, Bushnell was interviewed by then-current Atari CEO Wade Rosen for the Atari 50 video game where he discussed his history with the company and its relevance in the modern era.

== Accolades ==
Bushnell is considered to be the "father of electronic gaming" due to his contributions in establishing the arcade game market and creation of Atari. There had been debate between whether Bushnell or Ralph H. Baer, who is credited with creating the first home video game console, should be considered the father of video games, which had led to some bad blood between the two inventors. However, the industry recognized that Baer should be considered the father of home video gaming, while Bushnell is credited with innovating the arcade game.

At the British Academy Video Games Awards on March 10, 2009, the British Academy of Film and Television Arts awarded the Academy Fellowship to Bushnell in recognition of his outstanding achievement as a founding father of the video games industry.

=== Planned biographical film ===
Since 2008, there has been interest to a biographical film about Bushnell's life. While Bushnell had been approached by others to make such a film and turned these offers down, he accepted an offer made by Paramount Pictures in June 2008 with a script by Craig Sherman and Brian Hecker, with Leonardo DiCaprio envisioned to star as Bushnell. While news of the film was quiet over the next ten years, in March 2018, film financing company Vision Tree was working to start an initial coin offering for cryptocurrency to raise up to US$40 million for the film, which was set to be produced by DiCaprio's studio Appian Way Productions, Vision Tree, and Avery Productions.

=== GDC Pioneer Award controversy ===
In January 2018, the Advisory Committee of the Game Developers Choice Awards announced that Bushnell would receive the Pioneer Award at the March ceremony at the Game Developers Conference (GDC), crediting his role at Atari. That day, several people through social media, including Brianna Wu, claimed Bushnell fostered a toxic work environment at Atari for women that became the foundation for the then-future video game industry, based on several documented interviews and accounts of Atari at the time of the 1970s and 1980s; a notable example was of Bushnell holding board meetings in a hot tub and invited female secretaries to join them. Wu and others asserted that while Bushnell had done much for the industry, recognizing him with this type of award during the ongoing #MeToo movement was sending the wrong message. Wu stated, "Nolan Bushnell deserves to be honored, but this is not the right time for it. It's easy to draw a line between the culture he created at Atari and the structural sexism women in tech face today." The hashtag "#NotNolan" was shared by those with similar complaints about the GDC's choice.

The following day, the Advisory Committee reconsidered the selection of Bushnell for the award and announced the Pioneer Award would not be awarded, and instead it would be used that year to "honor the pioneering and unheard voices of the past". GDC further stated that they believed their selections "should reflect the values of today's game industry". Bushnell released a statement agreeing with the committee's decision:

I applaud the GDC for ensuring that their institution reflects what is right, specifically with regards to how people should be treated in the workplace. And if that means an award is the price I have to pay personally so the whole industry may be more aware and sensitive to these issues, I applaud that, too. If my personal actions or the actions of anyone who ever worked with me offended or caused pain to anyone at our companies, then I apologize without reservation.

— @NolanBushnell, Twitter, January 31, 2018

In a later statement to Kotaku, Bushnell cautioned that "exploring these kinds of issues through a finite, 40-year-old prism [does not offer] a productive reflection of our company", and referred to feedback from his former employees. Kotaku spoke to a dozen female former Atari employees, some whom had already spoken out on social media. All who agreed that while the company's 1970s and 1980s workplace was influenced by the broader Sexual Revolution, the allegations made against Bushnell were exaggerated or false, and that the culture was one that they all freely participated in. Some of the more notable female employees of Atari spoke further of the situation at the company and Bushnell during the 1970s:

- Elaine Shirley, who worked at Atari during the Bushnell years, said, "Those were the times. He [Nolan Bushnell] hit on women and they hit on him. If the #MeToo movement was active when Atari was alive, I think half our company would be charged. To my knowledge, no one ever did anything they did not want to do."
- Loni Reeder, who was responsible for communications, security, and facilities at Atari and later cofounded uWink with Bushnell, stated, "I was treated fairly and paid well. I have fellow Atari women friends who also know Nolan. None of us were offended by him." Reeder further stated of the workplace at Atari, "I take great offense of people coming in today and saying we were oppressed...We had a united and cohesive environment. That was what the ’70s were about. It wasn't like we all got together to have an orgy."
- Carol Kantor, the first games user researcher and who led an all-female games user research team at Atari, said, "I know there are people out there who are accused and really were guilty of sexual harassment. But not Nolan. It wasn't in his character. I certainly stand up for the Nolan that I knew. He certainly didn't hold his power over people."

The women interviewed by Kotaku generally considered the attack and decision related to Bushnell's award as unfair, and expressed anger at those that had raised the issue with the committee. Some stated that those who accused Bushnell of sexism did not take into consideration the culture of the time, and there was a clear and distinct difference between the sexualized occurrences at Atari in the 1970s, and the real harassment and threats faced by women in the current #MeToo movement.

The situation has led to discussion of how the Atari workplace may have influenced the current video game industry. In an editorial, Dean Takahashi suggested the current environment within the video game industry was more heavily influenced by Nintendo, Sony, and Microsoft, which took drastically different approaches to workplace culture.

Business positions
Preceded by Start	CEO of Atari, Inc. (A Warner Communications Company); 1976–1979	Succeeded by Ray Kassar
