= Reuben Snake =

Ho-Chunk activist, educator

Reuben Alvis Snake Jr.
- Born: January 12, 1937; Winnebago Indian Reservation, Thurston County, Nebraska, U.S.
- Died: June 28, 1993 (aged 56)
- Other names: Kee-Kah-Wah-Un-Ga, Your Humble Serpent
- Citizenship: Ho-Chunk (Winnebago), United States
- Occupations: Activist, educator, spiritual leader, tribal leader
- Spouse: Kathy McKee
- Children: 6

Reuben Alvis Snake Jr. (1937–1993) was an American Ho-Chunk (Winnebago) activist, educator, spiritual leader, and tribal leader. He served as a leader within the American Indian Movement (AIM) in the 1970s, and in the National Congress of American Indians in the 1980s. Snake worked towards the establishment of the American Indian Religious Freedom Act, which passed in 1994, after his death. He advocated for the use of religious, ceremonial peyote.

== Early life and education ==
Reuben Alvis Snake Jr., was born on January 12, 1937, on the Winnebago Indian Reservation in Thurston County, Nebraska. His parents, Reuben Harold and Virginia Greyhair Snake, divorced, and he experienced many other instabilities during his childhood.

In 1950, he briefly attended the Haskell Institute (now Haskell Indian Nations University) but dropped out while struggling with alcoholism. He joined the United States Army, serving from 1956 to 1958, and was honorably discharged.

== Career ==
In August 1970, he participated in the Native American occupation of Mount Rushmore (i.e., "Mount Crazy Horse"). In 1972, he became the national chairman of the American Indian Movement (AIM), a civil rights organization focused on Native Americans, and worked as a leader for the Trail of Broken Treaties. In 1975, Snake was appointed chairman of the Winnebago Tribe of Nebraska. From 1985 until 1987, Snake was the president of the National Congress of American Indians. While working for the National Congress of American Indians, Snake made buttons that read, "your humble servant". He later went by the nickname, "Your Humble Serpent". Snake also taught culture courses at the Institute of American Indian Arts (IAIA).

Snake served as a spiritual leader and roadman (a peyote leader) within the Native American Church starting in 1974. Snake fought the overturn of Employment Division v. Smith (1990) and subsequently organized the Native American Religious Freedom Project to lobby for national legislation, an effort that culminated in a 1994 amendment to the American Indian Religious Freedom Act, extending protections of the Religious Freedom Restoration Act to religious peyote use by Native Americans.

== Death and legacy ==
By the age of 40 he had already suffered from two heart attacks and diabetes. Snake died on June 28, 1993, at the age of 56.

A year after his death, the Religious Freedom Restoration Act was amended by President Bill Clinton under the name the American Indian Religious Freedom Act, which allowed for the use of peyote in religious ceremony.

He was the subject of the posthumous biography, Your Humble Serpent: The Wisdom of Reuben Snake (1995; Clear Light Books; written by Jay Fikes) and a documentary film of the same title (1996; Peacedream Productions; by film director Gary Rhine). His archive is located in the National Museum of the American Indian in Washington, D.C.

Michael Pollan wrote the book How to Change Your Mind (2018), which became a Netflix docuseries in 2022 of the same name and featured a segment on Native American use of peyote (mescaline) and mentions Snake's legal battle (season 1, episode 4).

== Publications ==
- Fikes, Jay C.; Snake, Reuben (1996). Reuben Snake: Your Humble Serpent. Clear Light Publishers. ISBN 9780940666603.
- Smith, Huston; Snake, Reuben (1996). One Nation Under God: The Triumph of the Native American Church. Clear Light Publishers. ISBN 9780940666719.
