= Maddy Dychtwald =

American writer

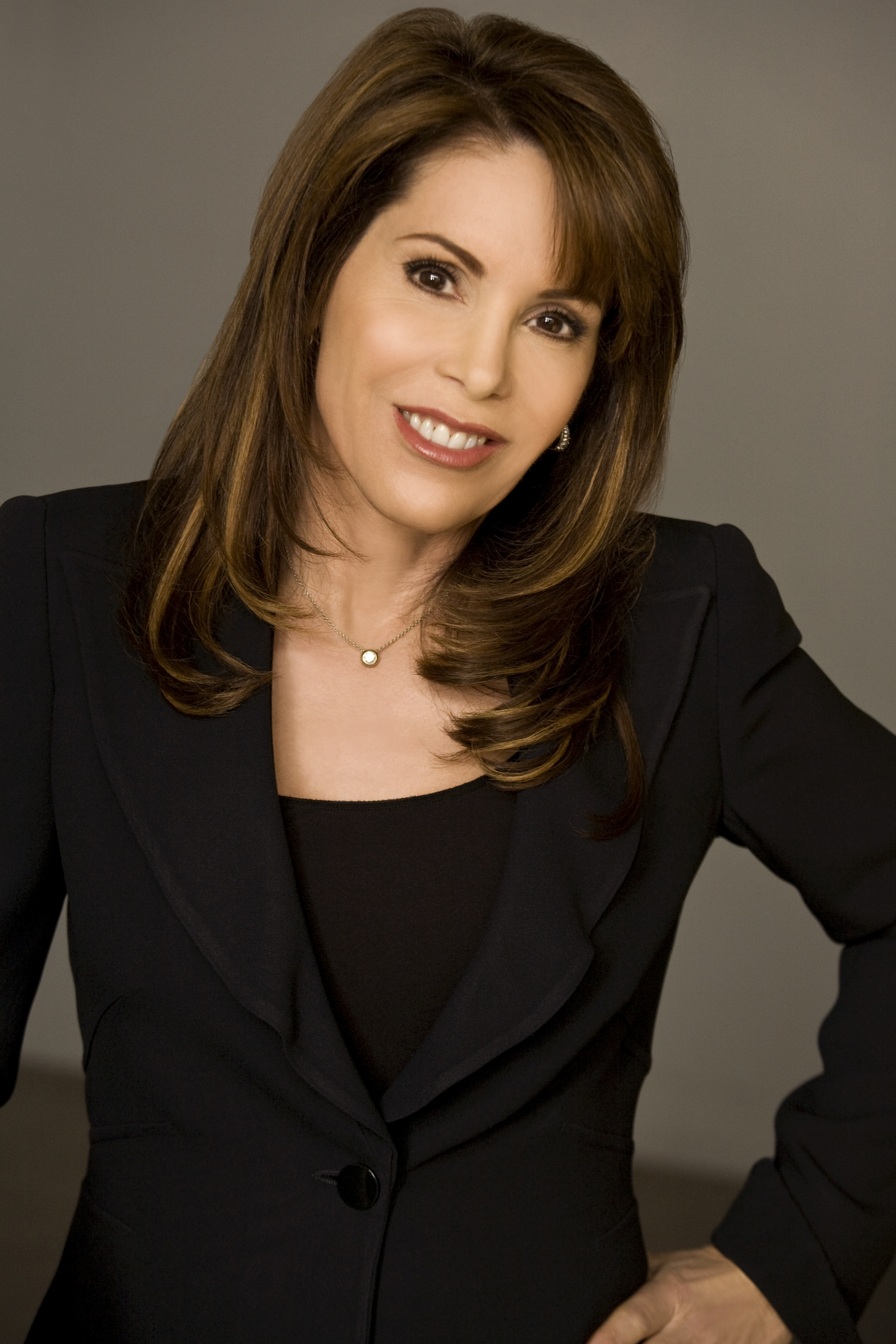
- Occupations: Author, professional speaker
- Known for: Co-founder Age Wave
- Spouse: Ken Dychtwald
- Website: maddydychtwald.com agewave.com

Maddy Kent Dychtwald is an American author and professional speaker. She co-founded Age Wave, a California Bay Area-based consulting and research company. Her books have discussed the economic improvement of women over time and how the increasing social and political power of women will impact fields such as financial services, healthcare, and consumer marketing.

== Career ==
=== Authorship ===
Dychtwald is the author of four books. Her 2024 book Ageless Aging appeared on the USA Today and Publishers Weekly national best-seller lists. Her work explores topics such as women's economic progress and its influence on industries like financial services, healthcare, and marketing. Influence: How Women’s Soaring Economic Power Will Transform Our World for the Better examines shifting gender roles, highlighting that women now make up more than half of the workforce and earn the majority of university degrees.

Cycles: How We Will Live, Work, and Buy analyzes demographic trends, particularly the growing economic influence of older adults. The Boston Globe described the book as “thought-provoking” and “packed with anecdotes.” In the children’s book Gideon’s Dream: A Tale of New Beginnings, co-authored with Ken Dychtwald, she introduces children to the idea that people of all ages experience change. The book features illustrations by Disney artist Dave Zaboski and his 7-year-old daughter.

=== News and media ===
Dychtwald has been featured in various media outlets including U.S. News & World Report and TIME. She is a contributor to the Wall Street Journal's Retirement Expert Panel, where she authored the top wealth-management expert post for 2017 and 2018 based on reader traffic.

=== Professional speaking and consulting ===
Dychtwald has appeared on programs such as LA Times Today, Yahoo Finance, and CBS Chicago, discussing topics related to longevity and women's health. Additionally, she has been featured on numerous podcasts, including The Blonde Files, Your Money Map, and Voices of Esalen, where she offers practical advice on enhancing healthspan and embracing aging.

Dychtwald and her husband co-founded Age Wave, a consulting firm focused on advising the baby boomer generation on various issues. In 2007, she spoke to the Greater Raleigh Chamber of Commerce about the economic impact of baby boomers working later in life. In collaboration with Merrill Lynch's Women and Financial Wellness division, she co-led a study that identified a significant gender wage gap, attributing it in part to women retiring earlier, which can lead to financial challenges in later life.

== Awards and honors ==
In 2016, Dychtwald and her husband, Ken Dychtwald, received the Esalen Prize for "Advancing Human Potential of Aging Population".

== Personal life ==
A graduate of New York University, Dychtwald has been a working mother living in the San Francisco Bay Area for much of her adult life. She is married to Ken Dychtwald. They live in Orinda, California, and have two adult children, Zak and Casey.

== Books ==
- Ageless Aging: A Woman's Guide to Increasing Healthspan, Brainspan, and Lifespan, with contributor Kate Hanley, Mayo Clinic Press, 2024
- Influence: How Women's Soaring Economic Power Will Transform Our World for the Better, with Christine Larsen, Hachette, 2010
- Cycles: How We Will Live, Work, and Buy, Free Press, 2003 and 2008
- Gideon's Dream: A Tale of New Beginnings, co-authored with Ken Dychtwald, Grace Zaboski, and Dave Zaboski (illustrator), HarperCollins, 2008
