= Ken Dychtwald =

American entrepreneur, gerontologist, psychologist, and lecturer

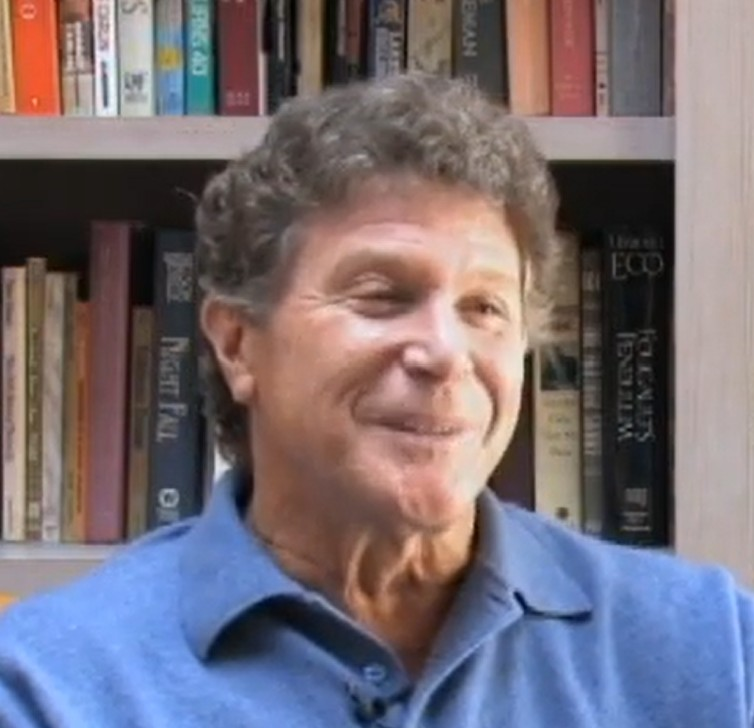
- Born: 1950 (age 75–76)
- Education: Lehigh University
- Occupation: Gerontologist Psychologist Lecturer
- Known for: Co-founder and CEO of Age Wave
- Spouse: Maddy Dychtwald
- Children: 2
- Website: agewave.com

Kenneth M. Dychtwald (born 1950) is an American entrepreneur, gerontologist, psychologist, and lecturer. He is a co-founder and chief executive officer of Age Wave, a California Bay Area-based population ageing business management company.

== Early life and education ==
Dychtwald grew up in Newark, New Jersey, and graduated from Weequahic High School in 1967.

Dychtwald studied at Lehigh University and received his Ph.D. in psychology from Union Graduate School. He turned his doctoral thesis into a book, Bodymind.

== Career ==
Dychtwald spent much of his career developing and honing the concept of the "Age Wave", a population and cultural shift caused by the converging global demographic forces of the Mid-20th century baby boom, increasing life expectancy, and the declining fertility rates of the later 20th and early 21st centuries.

In 1973, Dychtwald co-founded the SAGE Project, an organization funded by the National Institutes of Health with the mission of improving health, wellness, and quality of life for older adults. In 1982, he joined a panel created by the Office of Technology Assessment, a think tank for the US Congress, to examine how population aging would impact America in the 21st century.

In 1986, Dychtwald and his wife, Maddy, founded Age Wave, a think tank and consultancy with a perspective on the social, business, healthcare, and financial implications and opportunities of global aging and rising longevity. Under Ken Dychtwald, Age Wave has conducted research studies with several Fortune 500 companies, including Edward Jones and Bank of America Merrill Lynch.

Dychtwald served as a fellow and presenter at the World Economic Forum and was a delegate and featured presenter at both the 1995 and 2005 White House Conferences on Aging.

He co-authored, along with Sandra Day O'Connor and Stanley Prusiner, an op-ed, The Age of Alzheimer's, published by The New York Times in 2010.

Dychtwald was asked by Jon Monday to be filmed interviewing world religion scholar Huston Smith, on Smith's perspective of aging in the various cultures of the world and his personal perspective of growing old. As Smith was an early teacher of comparative religious studies in the 1950s and 1960s, now approaching his ninth decade, he could also help provide a perspective on aging. The interview was released in 2012 on DVD as The Arc of Life.

In 2022, Dychtwald hosted The Legacy Interviews, a webcast with notable figures in the field of aging and longevity. This was turned into a 12-part podcast, a book, and a 60-minute documentary called Sages of Aging that aired nationally on public television.

Dychtwald often publishes on the topics of aging and retirement, particularly in The New York Times Sunday Magazine, Yahoo!, Forbes Magazine, and The Huffington Post.

== Recognition ==
In 2004, Dychtwald, Tamara Erickson, and Bob Morison wrote the article It's Time to Retire Retirement, which tied for the first place McKinsey Award as the best article of the year in the Harvard Business Review. In 2012, he co-envisioned the idea of an Alzheimer's XPRIZE with XPRIZE Founder Dr. Peter Diamandis. He is a member of the Board of Trustees at the XPRIZE Foundation and is the former Chair of the Alzheimer's XPRIZE.

In 2016, Dychtwald and his wife, Maddy Dychtwald, received the Esalen Prize for "Advancing Human Potential of Aging Population". Dychtwald also received the Inspire Award from the International Council on Active Aging in 2018, recognizing individuals for their contributions to the active-aging industry. In 2023, he received the American Society on Aging’s President’s Award for evolving the world’s understanding of what aging means (Dychtwald was also honored by ASA in 1996 and 2013).

== Film and television ==
- Age Power! With Ken Dychtwald: How the 21st Century Will be Ruled by the New Old, PBS, 2000.
- The Boomer Century: 1946-2046, PBS, 2007.
- With Purpose: Going from Success to Significance In Work and Life, PBS, 2009.
- The Arc of Life: Huston Smith on Life, Death & Beyond, mondayMEDIA, 2012.
- High Point University Presents: Ken Dychtwald & Nido Qubein, PBS, 2014.
- Life's Third Age, Public Television, 2020-2021.
- Sages of Aging, PBS, 2022.

== Books ==
- Bodymind, Tarcher/Putman, 1986
- Wellness and Health Promotion for the Elderly, Aspen Pub, 1986
- Age Wave: How the Most Important Trend of Our Time Will Change Your Future, with co-author Joe Flower, Bantam Books, 1990
- Healthy Aging: Challenges and Solutions, Aspen, 1999
- Age Power: How the 21st Century Will Be Ruled by the New Old, Tarcher/Putnam, 2000
- Leaving a Legacy: The Essential Resource for Financial Professionals, with co-authors Mark Zesbaugh and Catherine Fredman, Age Wave Press, 2006
- The Power Years: A User's Guide to the Rest of Your Life, with co-author Daniel J. Kadlec, Wiley, 2005
- Workforce Crisis: How to Beat the Coming Shortage of Skills and Talent, with co-authors Tamara J. Erickson and Robert Morison, Harvard Business Review Press, 2006
- Gideon's Dream: A Tale of New Beginnings, co-authored with Maddy Dychtwald, Grace Zaboski, and Dave Zaboski (illustrator), HarperCollins, 2008
- With Purpose: Going From Success to Significance in Work and Life, with co-author Daniel J. Kadlec, William Morrow, 2009
- A New Purpose: Redefining Money, Family, Work, Retirement, and Success, with co-author Daniel J. Kadlec, Harper Paperbacks, 2010
- What Retirees Want: A Holistic View of Life's Third Age, with co-author Robert Morison, Wiley, 2020
- Radical Curiosity: One Man's Search for Cosmic Magic and a Purposeful Life, Unnamed Press, 2021
- Sages of Aging: A Guide for Changemakers, Nova Science Publishers, 2022
- Radical Curiosity: My Life on the Age Wave, Unnamed Press, 2023

== Personal life ==
Dychtwald is married to Maddy Dychtwald. They live in Orinda, California, and have two children, Zak and Casey.
