= Live at McCabe's =

Live at McCabe's may refer to:

- Live at McCabe's (Byron Berline album), 1978
- Live at McCabe's (Norman Blake album), 1976
- Live at McCabe's Guitar Shop (Freedy Johnston album), 1998
- Live at McCabe's (Shelby Lynne album), 2012
- Live at McCabe's Guitar Shop (Tom Paxton album), 1991
- Live at McCabe's (Henry Rollins album), 1990
- Live at McCabe's Guitar Shop (Chris Smither album), 2003
- Live at McCabe's (Townes Van Zandt album), 1995
- Live at McCabe's Guitar Shop (Nancy Wilson album), 1999

== See also ==
- McCabe's Guitar Shop
