= Samuel "Mouli" Cohen =

Israeli-American entrepreneur and fraudster (born 1958)

- שמעון "מולי" כהן
- Mouli Cohen
- Born: Samuel Cohen; April 8, 1958 (age 68); Jerusalem, Israel
- Other name: Mouli
- Occupations: ex-entrepreneur, executive, venture capitalist
- Spouse: Stacy Cohen
- Status: Incarcerated at FCI Terminal Island; Federal Bureau of Prisons Register #57613-112; projected release date: November 16, 2029
- Conviction: November 9, 2011
- Criminal charges: Wire fraud, money laundering, tax evasion
- Penalty: 22 years imprisonment
- Accomplice: Hari Dillon

Samuel "Mouli" Cohen (Hebrew: שמעון "מולי" כהן; born April 8, 1958) is an Israeli-American entrepreneur, venture capitalist, and convicted fraudster who claimed to have held the positions of president, chairman, and CEO of several public and private video game companies which, according to Cohen, "have generated over $3 Billion in shareholder value". The companies Cohen has been involved in since the 1980s include: Playnet Technologies, Voltage Capital, LAMIA, Aristo International and Ecast. In April 2012, Cohen was sentenced to 22 years in federal prison for a conviction on 15 counts of wire fraud, 11 counts of money laundering and three counts of tax evasion. He is currently serving a 22-year prison sentence at Terminal Island Federal Correctional Institution.

== Career ==
In the mid-1990s Cohen put together a team of veteran video game producers, engineers, marketing specialists, and executives for Playnet, a public company listed on NASDAQ. Cohen was president, CEO, and chairman of the company. Employees included Nolan Bushnell, the inventor of Pong and founder of Atari and Chuck E. Cheese; Joe Ybarra, who worked at Apple before joining Electronic Arts in their startup phase as a producer, and was president of Infocom and senior VP of Cheyene Mountain Entertainment; and Glenn Sblendorio, former CFO of Sony Entertainment.

The company developed two main products: A touchscreen controlled "bar top", coin-operated video game machine and a digital jukebox, capable of storing an extremely large selection of songs and able to download new releases. Playnet, later Aristo International, had offices in San Francisco, New York, and Virginia. In October 1997 Playnet announced an agreement with Holiday Inn, a major international hotel chain, to launch a pilot program to install the video game machine in a minimum of six Holiday Inn and Crowne Plaza locations across the US. Playnet filed for Chapter 11 bankruptcy in 1998.

Cohen was the founder of Voltage Capital, a company that Cohen claimed was involved in research and investments in solar energy and other forms of green technology.

== Personal life ==
Cohen was born in Jerusalem, Israel. He migrated to the USA in 1987. He is married to writer and former actress Stacy Cohen, author of the 2008 book The Kosher Billionaire's Secret Recipe.

Cohen was featured in the TV series American Greed. An entire episode about his scams were discussed in the Season 7 episode titled: "Dealing in Deceit".

== Conviction ==
In 2009, Mouli Cohen defrauded investors of more than $28 million, and two lawsuits were filed. Cohen told investors that his company, Ecast, Inc., was about to be acquired by Microsoft. Based on those false representations, victims purchased some of Cohen's founders' shares in Ecast. A federal grand jury in 2010 indicted Cohen on 32 felony counts of fraud and money laundering, and he was arrested on August 5, 2010. In November 2011, Cohen was found guilty of 15 counts of wire fraud, 11 counts of money laundering, and three counts of tax evasion. He was acquitted of six additional charges. After the verdict, Cohen was remanded into custody by Judge Charles Breyer.

U.S. Attorney Melinda Haag said evidence at the trial showed that Cohen collected more than $30 million from defrauding over 55 investors, including actor Danny Glover and the Vanguard Public Foundation (a San Francisco-based nonprofit supported by Glover and Harry Belafonte that funded civil rights efforts). Cohen was cited as largely responsible for the eventual dissolution of Vanguard in 2011.

Cohen didn't testify at trial and his lawyer said he expected Cohen would appeal the conviction.

At the sentencing hearing, Cohen's lawyer asked for a reduced sentence as recognition of Cohen having given $2 million to charity but the judge said that, "It's other people's money. The fact of the matter is that you gave their money to others and pretended it was yours."

The prosecution described Cohen as a "congenital liar and serial fraudster" and recommended to the court that Cohen be sentenced to between 30 years to life and be denied bail while awaiting sentencing. On April 30, 2012, Cohen was sentenced to 22 years in prison.
