= Huston Smith =

American-Chinese religious studies scholar (1919–2016)

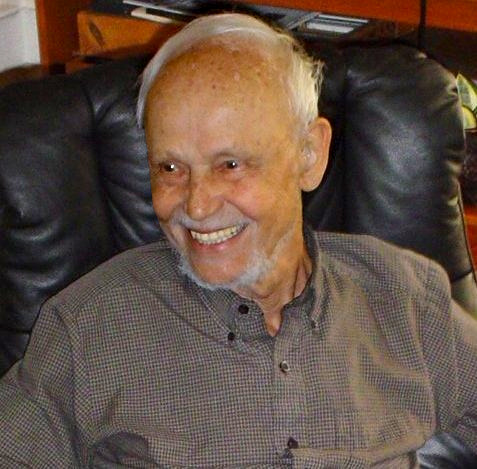
- Smith in 2005
- Born: May 31, 1919; Suzhou, China
- Died: December 30, 2016 (aged 97); Berkeley, California, U.S.
- Known for: Author of The World's Religions
- Spouse: Kendra Smith

Academic background
- Education: Central Methodist University (BA); University of Chicago (PhD)

Academic work
- Discipline: Religious studies, philosophy
- Institutions: University of Denver; Washington University in St. Louis; Massachusetts Institute of Technology; Syracuse University; University of California, Berkeley

Huston Cummings Smith (May 31, 1919 – December 30, 2016) was a Chinese-born American scholar of religious studies, He authored at least thirteen books on world's religions and philosophy, and his book about comparative religion, The World's Religions (originally titled The Religions of Man) sold over three million copies as of 2017.

Born and raised in Suzhou, China, in an American Methodist missionary family, Smith moved back to the United States at the age of 17 and graduated from the University of Chicago in 1945 with a PhD in religious studies, focusing on the philosophy of religion. He spent the majority of his academic career as a professor at Washington University in St. Louis (1947–1958), the Massachusetts Institute of Technology (1958–1973) and Syracuse University (1973–1983). In 1983, he retired from Syracuse and moved to Berkeley, California, where he was a visiting professor of religious studies at the University of California, Berkeley, until his death.

== Early life ==
On May 31, 1919, Huston Cummings Smith was born in Dzang Zok, Suzhou, China, to Methodist missionaries and spent his first 17 years there. His second language was Mandarin Chinese, spoken in the Suzhou dialect.

Upon emigrating to the United States to complete his education, he received a BA from Central Methodist University in 1940 and became an ordained Methodist minister. He then realized a passion for teaching and started a PhD at University of Chicago Divinity School, which he completed in 1945.

== Personal life ==
While at Chicago, he married Eleanor Wieman, the daughter of Henry Nelson Wieman, a professor at the University of Chicago Divinity School. She later changed her name to Kendra. They had three daughters, Karen, Gael, and Kimberly Smith.

== Academic career ==
Smith taught at the University of Denver from 1945 to 1947, and then at Washington University, for the next 10 years.

In 1958, Smith was appointed professor of philosophy at the Massachusetts Institute of Technology (MIT), where he remained until 1973. While there, he participated in experiments with psychedelics that professors Timothy Leary and Richard Alpert conducted at Harvard University. In 1964, during a trip to India, Smith stayed in a Gyuto Tibetan Buddhist monastery. During his visit he heard the monks chanting and realized that each individual was producing a chord, composed of a fundamental note and overtones. He returned to record the chanting in 1967 and asked acoustic engineers at MIT to analyze the sound. They confirmed the finding, which is an example of overtone singing. Smith has called this the singular empirical discovery of his career. The recording was released as Music of Tibet (1967). Royalties from the album continue to support the Gyuto Tantric University. Because of his belief in religion, however, Smith was mistrusted by his colleagues, leading MIT to prohibit him from teaching graduate students.

In 1973, Smith moved to Syracuse University, where he was Thomas J. Watson Professor of Religion and Distinguished Adjunct Professor of Philosophy until he took emeritus status in 1983. That year, Smith moved to Berkeley, California, where he remained a visiting professor of religious studies at the University of California, Berkeley, until his death. In 1997, Smith entered into an agreement with the Syracuse University Archives to donate his papers, resulting in a large collection of published books, articles, reviews, or endorsements.

== Religious practice ==
During his career, Smith studied Vedanta under Swami Satprakashananda, founder of the Vedanta Society of St. Louis, Zen Buddhism, studying under Goto Zuigan, and Sufism of Islam for more than ten years each.

As a young man, Smith suddenly turned from traditional Methodist Christianity to mysticism, influenced by the writings of Aldous Huxley and Gerald Heard. In 1947, before moving from Denver to St. Louis, Smith set out to meet with Heard. Heard invited him to his Trabuco College (later donated as the Ramakrishna Monastery of the Vedanta Society of Southern California) in Trabuco Canyon, Southern California. Heard made arrangements to have Smith meet Huxley. Smith recounts in the 2010 documentary Huxley on Huxley meeting Huxley at his desert home. Smith was told to look up Swami Satprakashananda of the Vedanta Society of St. Louis once he settled in St. Louis. So began Smith's experimentation with meditation and association with the Vedanta Societies of the Ramakrishna Order. Smith developed an interest in the Traditionalist School formulated by René Guénon, Frithjof Schuon and Ananda Coomaraswamy.

Due to his connection with Heard and Huxley, Smith went on to meet Timothy Leary, Richard Alpert (Ram Dass), and others at the Center for Personality Research, where Leary was research professor. The group began experimenting with psychedelics and what Smith later called "empirical metaphysics". The experience and history of the group are described in Smith's book Cleansing the Doors of Perception. During this period, Smith was also part of the Harvard Psilocybin Project, an attempt to raise spiritual awareness through entheogenic plants. However, he gave voice to the contrast between himself and Leary when he reminisced about encountering the exile Tim Leary in Switzerland, years later (early 1970s): “he was still a fugitive from lawful society—kicked out of it as he had been kicked out of West Point, Harvard University, and Zihuatanejo.”

During his tenure at Syracuse University, he was informed by leaders of the Onondaga tribe about the Native American religious traditions and practices, which resulted in an additional chapter in his book on the world's religions. In 1990 the Supreme Court ruled that the use of peyote as a religious sacrament by Native Americans was not protected under the US Constitution. Smith took up the cause as a religion scholar. With his help in 1994, Congress passed the American Indian Religious Freedom Act amendment, providing legislative protection to a religious practice that the Supreme Court had decided lacks constitutional protection.

Smith was a practicing Christian, with a Vedantic understanding, who credited his faith to his missionary parents who had "instilled in me a Christianity that was able to withstand the dominating secular culture of modernity".

== Public activities ==
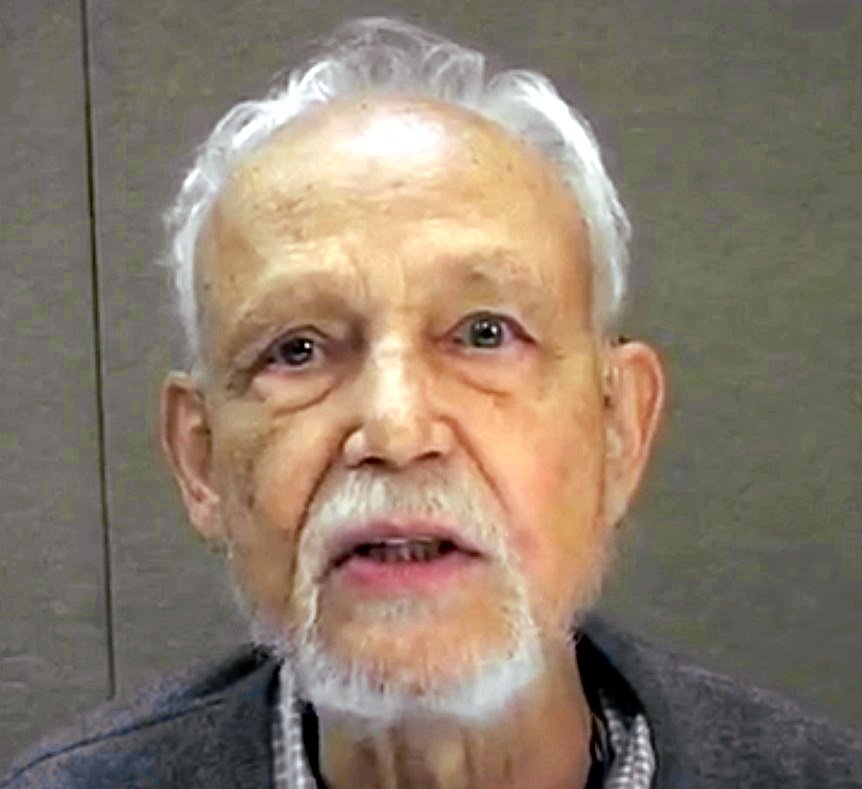
Smith in 2004

=== Television and film ===
While at Washington University, Smith was the host of two National Educational Television series (NET – the forerunner of PBS): The Religions of Man and Search for America.

In 1996, Bill Moyers devoted a 5-part PBS special to Smith's life and work, The Wisdom of Faith with Huston Smith. Smith produced three series for public television: The Religions of Man, The Search for America, and (with Arthur Compton) Science and Human Responsibility. His films on Hinduism, Tibetan Buddhism, and Sufism have all won awards at international film festivals.

- The Wisdom of Faith with Huston Smith: A Bill Moyers Special: A Personal Philosophy, 1996, PBS, DVD
- The Roots of Fundamentalism: A Conversation with Huston Smith and Phil Cousineau, 2006, GemsTone, DVD Produced and Directed by Jon Monday.
- Death and Transformation: The Personal Reflections of Huston Smith, 2007, Fons Vitae, DVD
- The Arc of Life: Huston Smith on Life, Death & Beyond, Huston interviewed by Ken Dychtwald, on his life and career 2012, GemsTone, DVD Produced and Directed by Jon Monday.
- The Official Huston Smith Archive includes both complete NET television series episodes of The Religions of Man and Search for America

=== Community engagement ===
Throughout his career, Smith made himself available to the communities where he resided. Toward the end of his life, while living in Berkeley, California, he participated in the Pacific Coast Theological Society at the Graduate Theological Union. He also attended local churches, including Trinity United Methodist, First Congregational Church, and Epworth United Methodist. On the occasion of publishing Tales of Wonder, in 2009 he co-convened "community conversations" at Epworth, during which he responded to questions about his life and work.

== Awards and honors ==
For his lifelong commitment to bringing the world's religions together to promote understanding, social justice and peace, Smith received the Courage of Conscience Award from the Peace Abbey in Sherborn, Massachusetts.

Smith was named to be one of the first recipients of the Order of Universal Interfaith and Universal Order of Sannyasa's Interfaith-Interspiritual Sage Award in January 2010. He received the award at his home on February 23, 2010.

The Pacific Coast Theological Society celebrated "the lifetime of achievements of Professor Emeritus Huston Smith by considering the relationship between theology, mythology, and science" in a special session in 2012. In 2015, the society presented Smith with their Codron Prize for The World's Religions.

== Legacy ==
=== Quotes ===
- "Institutions are not pretty. Show me a pretty government. Healing is wonderful, but the American Medical Association? Learning is wonderful, but universities? The same is true for religion... religion is institutionalized spirituality."
- "The goal of spiritual life is not altered states, but altered traits."

=== Publications ===
- The Purposes of Higher Education, 1955, reprint ed. 1971, Harper & Row, ISBN 0837146984
- The World's Religions: Our Great Wisdom Traditions, 1958, rev. ed. 1991, HarperOne, ISBN 0-06-250811-3
- Great Religions of the World, with Robert McAfee Brown, Amiya Chakravarty, Wing-tsit Chan, W. D. Davies, Hans J. Hillerbrand, Edward J. Jurji, Joseph M. Kitagawa, Oliver Statler, Herbert Weiner, John P. Whalen, and Elie Wiesel, 1971, National Geographic Society.
- Forgotten Truth: The Common Vision of the World's Religions, 1976, reprint ed. 1992, HarperOne, ISBN 0-06-250787-7
- Beyond the Postmodern Mind, 1982, reprint ed. 1989, Quest Books, ISBN 0-8356-0647-3
- The Illustrated World's Religions: A Guide to Our Wisdom Traditions, 1995, HarperOne, ISBN 0-06-067440-7
- Smith, Huston; Snake, Reuben (1996). One Nation Under God: The Triumph of the Native American Church. Clear Light Publishers. ISBN 9780940666719.
- Cleansing the Doors of Perception: The Religious Significance of Entheogenic Plants and Chemicals, 2000, Tarcher/Putnam, ISBN 1-58542-034-4, Council on Spiritual Practices, ISBN 1-889725-03-X, Sentient Publications, ISBN 1-59181-008-6
- Why Religion Matters: The Fate of the Human Spirit in an Age of Disbelief, 2001, HarperOne, 1st ed.:ISBN 0-06-067099-1, reprint 2002: ISBN 0-06-067102-5
- Islam: A Concise Introduction, HarperOne, 2001, ISBN 0-06-166018-3
- The Way Things Are: Conversations with Huston Smith on the Spiritual Life, 2003, University of California Press, ISBN 0-520-23816-8 (cloth); ISBN 0-520-24489-3 (paper) Edited and with a Preface by Phil Cousineau
- Buddhism: A Concise Introduction, with Philip Novak, HarperOne, 2004, ISBN 0-06-073067-6
- The Soul of Christianity: Restoring the Great Tradition, 2005, HarperOne, 1st ed. ISBN 0-06-079478-X
- A Seat at the Table: Huston Smith in Conversation with Native Americans on Religious Freedom, 2006, University of California Press, ISBN 0-520-24439-7 (cloth) edited and with a Preface by Phil Cousineau
- Tales of Wonder: Adventures Chasing the Divine, (autobiography), 2009, HarperOne, ISBN 0-06-1154261
- And Live Rejoicing: Chapters from a Charmed Life—Personal Encounters with Spiritual Mavericks, Remarkable Seekers, and the World's Great Religious Leaders, 2012, With contributions from Phil Cousineau

== See also ==
- Ananda Coomaraswamy
- René Guénon
- Martin Lings
- Seyyed Hossein Nasr
- Perennial philosophy
- Frithjof Schuon
- Ninian Smart
