= The World's Religions =

TV Series and Book by Huston Smith

The Religions of Man - The World's Religions
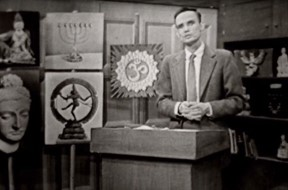
- Author: Huston Smith
- Language: English
- Subject: Religion
- Publication date: 1958

The Religions of Man began as a class taught by Huston Smith at Washington University in St. Louis. In 1955, the producers at KETC, the local NET (precursor of PBS) affiliate, were looking for original content for the newly launched national network. Upon asking the local university what the most popular class was, they were told it was Huston Smith's class. That series was the first TV show to offer college credit.

The success of the series led to the development of a book titled The Religions of Man (later re-titled The World's Religions), written by religious studies scholar Huston Smith. The book was first published in 1958 and has since been translated into twelve languages. It became "one of the most widely used college textbooks on comparative religion."

== Class and TV series ==
The class, The Religions of Man, was first broadcast in 1955 as a weekly TV series that had 17 episodes. Each episode focused on a different religion or aspect of a religion.

- 1. The Relevance of the Religious Man
- 2. Religion in the Hindu View of Life
- 3. The Four Yogas
- 4. Basic Concepts in Hinduism
- 5. Buddha's Life and Message
- 6. The Two Branches of Buddhism
- 7. Zen Buddhism
- 8. Confucianism
- 9. Taoism
- 10. Mohammad and His Message
- 11. The Social Teachings of Islam
- 12. Judaism Part 1 The Chosen People
- 13. Judaism Part 2 The Law
- 14. Christianity Part 1 Jesus the Anointed
- 15. Christianity Part 2 The Good News
- 16. Christianity Part 3 The Vine and the Branches
- 17. A Final Examination

== Book ==
The success of the TV series led to Smith writing a book that became the standard textbook for college and university classes on world religions. The book has ten chapters, with an introduction and subsequent chapters covering Hinduism, Buddhism, Confucianism, Daoism, Islam, Judaism, Christianity and 'primal' religions (including Australian Aboriginal beliefs ). The final chapter discusses the relations between different religions.

== Reviews ==
The book was reviewed in Kirkus Reviews and Publishers Weekly.
