= John Fahey discography =

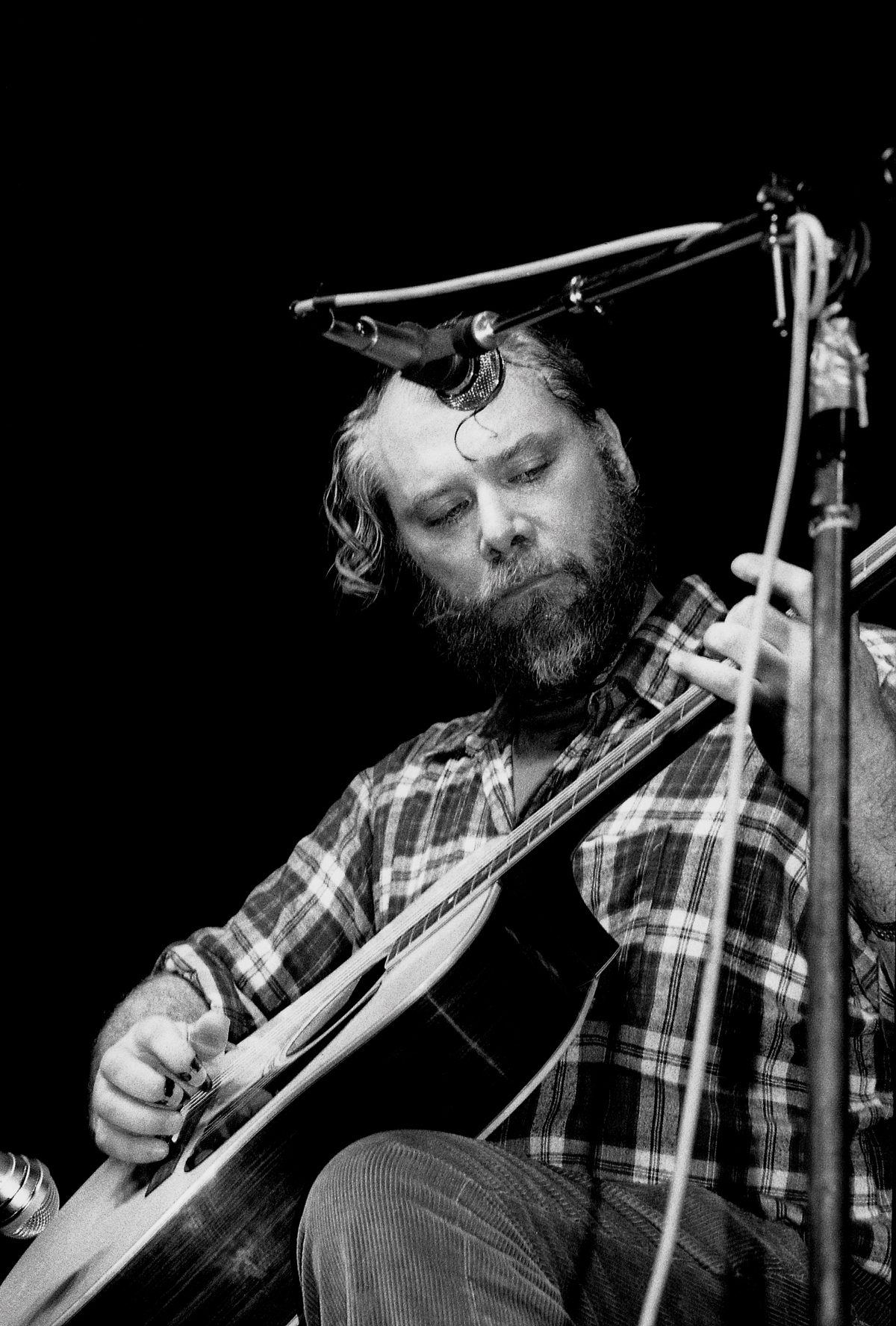
- Fahey performing in Paris, 1984
- Studio albums: 36
- Live albums: 5
- Compilation albums: 16
- Tribute albums: 5

The discography of the American guitarist and composer John Fahey consists of thirty-six studio albums, five live albums and sixteen compilation albums, as well as five tribute albums. A number of semi-official releases are excluded here, as are bootlegs and material from unreleased recording sessions which circulate among fans and collectors.

== Studio albums ==
| Year | Album title | Label |
|---|---|---|
| 1959 | Blind Joe Death | Takoma |
| 1963 | Death Chants, Breakdowns & Military Waltzes | Takoma |
| 1964 | The Dance of Death & Other Plantation Favorites | Takoma |
| 1965 | The Transfiguration of Blind Joe Death | Riverboat |
| 1966 | The Great San Bernardino Birthday Party & Other Excursions | Takoma |
| 1967 | Days Have Gone By | Takoma |
| 1967 | Requia | Vanguard |
| 1968 | The Voice of the Turtle | Takoma |
| 1968 | The Yellow Princess | Vanguard |
| 1968 | The New Possibility - John Fahey's Guitar Soli Christmas Album | Takoma |
| 1971 | America | Takoma |
| 1972 | Of Rivers and Religion | Reprise |
| 1973 | After the Ball | Reprise |
| 1973 | Fare Forward Voyagers (Soldier's Choice) | Takoma |
| 1975 | Old Fashioned Love | Takoma |
| 1975 | Christmas with John Fahey Vol. II | Takoma |
| 1979 | John Fahey Visits Washington D.C. | Takoma |
| 1980 | Yes! Jesus Loves Me | Takoma |
| 1982 | Christmas Guitar Volume I (A rerecording of The New Possibility) | Varrick |
| 1983 | Railroad | Takoma |
| 1983 | Popular Songs of Christmas & New Year's | Varrick |
| 1984 | Let Go | Varrick |
| 1985 | Rain Forests, Oceans and Other Themes | Varrick |
| 1987 | I Remember Blind Joe Death | Varrick |
| 1989 | God, Time and Causality | Shanachie |
| 1991 | The John Fahey Christmas Album | Burnside |
| 1992 | Old Girlfriends and Other Horrible Memories | Varrick |
| 1996 | Double 78 | Perfect |
| 1997 | City of Refuge | Tim/Kerr |
| 1997 | The Mill Pond (Double EP) | Little Brother |
| 1997 | Womblife | Table of the Elements |
| 1997 | The Epiphany of Glenn Jones | Thirsty Ear |
| 2000 | Hitomi | LivHouse |
| 2001 | Good Luck (With the John Fahey Trio) | One Hit |
| 2003 | Red Cross | Revenant |

== Live albums ==
| Year | Album | Label |
|---|---|---|
| 1981 | Live in Tasmania | Takoma |
| 1998 | Georgia Stomps, Atlanta Struts and Other Contemporary Dance Favorites | Table of the Elements |
| 2000 | KBOO Radio Live Session (With the John Fahey Trio) | One Hit |
| 2003 | Hard Time Empty Bottle Blues | Table of the Elements |
| 2004 | The Great Santa Barbara Oil Slick | Water/Revenant |
| 2005 | On Air | Tradition & Moderne |
| 2005 | Some Summer Day | Intergroove |

== Compilation albums ==
| Year | Album | Label |
|---|---|---|
| 1967 | Contemporary Guitar Spring 1967 (Compilation with tracks by Max Ochs, John Fahey, Bukka White, Harry Taussig and Robbie Basho.) | Takoma |
| 1969 | Memphis Swamp Jam (Three guitar duets by John Fahey, and Bill Barth using the pseudonyms of R L Watson and Josiah Jones.) | |
| 1970 | Zabriskie Point: Original Motion Picture Soundtrack (Motion picture soundtrack) | MGM |
| 1974 | The Essential John Fahey | Vanguard |
| 1974 | Leo Kottke, Peter Lang & John Fahey | Takoma |
| 1977 | The Best of John Fahey 1959–1977 | Takoma |
| 1993 | The New Possibility: John Fahey's Guitar Soli Christmas Album/Christmas with John Fahey Vol. 1 | Rhino |
| 1994 | The Return of the Repressed: The John Fahey Anthology | Rhino |
| 1996 | The Legend of Blind Joe Death | Takoma |
| 1996 | The Best of the Vanguard Years | Vanguard |
| 1996 | Death Chants, Breakdowns & Military Waltzes (Reissue of both issues of the album) | Takoma |
| 2002 | John Fahey Trio, Vol. 1 | Jazzoo |
| 2004 | The Best of John Fahey, Vol. 2: 1964–1983 | Takoma |
| 2004 | Of Rivers and Religion/After the Ball | Warner Bros. |
| 2005 | On the Sunny Side of the Ocean | Brook Records |
| 2006 | Sea Changes & Coelacanths: A Young Person's Guide to John Fahey | Table of the Elements |
| 2006 | Vanguard Visionaries | Vanguard |
| 2009 | Twilight on Prince Georges Avenue: Essential Recordings | Rounder |
| 2011 | Your Past Comes Back To Haunt You: The Fonotone Years 1958–1965 | Dust-to-Digital |
| 2023 | Proofs & Refutations (Reissues Double 78 alongside new material) | Drag City |

== Tribute albums ==
| Year | Album | Label |
|---|---|---|
| 1979 | A Tribute to John Fahey | Kicking Mule |
| 2006 | I Am the Resurrection: A Tribute to John Fahey | Vanguard |
| 2006 | Friends of Fahey Tribute | Slackertone |
| 2006 | The Revenge of Blind Joe Death: The John Fahey Tribute Album | Takoma |
| 2007 | The Great Koonaklaster Speaks: A John Fahey Celebration | Table of the Elements |
