= The Great Santa Barbara Oil Slick =

Live album by John Fahey
- Released: November 9, 2004
- Recorded: Portions recorded February 14, 1968, at The Matrix in San Francisco, CA
- Genre: American primitivism
- Length: 76:12
- Labels: Water; Revenant
- Producer: Glenn Jones

John Fahey chronology
The Best of John Fahey, Vol. 2: 1964–1983 (2003)	The Great Santa Barbara Oil Slick (2004)	On Air (2005)

The Great Santa Barbara Oil Slick is a live album by American fingerstyle guitarist and composer John Fahey, released posthumously on November 9, 2004.

== History ==
The Great Santa Barbara Oil Slick consists of previously unreleased live recordings from two shows in 1968 and 1969. The majority comes from a February 1968 performance at The Matrix in San Francisco; the other location is unknown.

The title track, while not included on any of Fahey's studio albums, contains portions of "Requiem for Russell Blaine Cooper" and "Voice of the Turtle", pieces which appeared on Requia and America respectively.

== Reception ==
Professional ratings
Review scores
Source	Rating
AllMusic	4/5 stars
The Encyclopedia of Popular Music	4/5 stars
Pitchfork	8.2/10

The Great Santa Barbara Oil Slick received positive reviews. Critic David Fricke, writing for Rolling Stone, referred to Fahey's "sublime distention of traditional forms". Richie Unterberger called it "a testament to Fahey's mastery of the tunes" and "a solid addition to the John Fahey canon". Referring to the time period of the live performance, Bill Meyer of Dusted Magazine writes that "no matter how much I admire Fahey’s determination to keep his creativity alive and appreciate some of what came out of that effort, I can’t get enough of this old stuff." and "[...] this is lovely music. 'Requiem for Mississippi John Hurt' overflows with triumph and joy, the opening of 'When the Catfish Is in Bloom' is so rich and regal you want to put your hand over your heart." Mark Richardson of Pitchfork refers to "When the Catfish Is in Bloom" as "sound[ing] about 200 years old and parts of it probably are, as references to marching spirituals slowly pile up into a ringing cluster of notes." Mojo's Andrew Male referred to it as "a strange guitarist at the top of his game."

== Track listing ==
All tracks are written by John Fahey, except where noted.

No.	Title	Writer(s)	Original album	Length
1.	"Introduction"			0:12
2.	"When the Springtime Comes Again"		Death Chants, Breakdowns & Military Waltzes	9:48
3.	"Joe Kirby Blues"		Days Have Gone By	3:45
4.	"Requiem for Mississippi John Hurt"		Requia	4:14
5.	"When the Catfish Is in Bloom"		Requia	7:56
6.	"Fahey Blows His Nose"			0:46
7.	"Intro to "Lion" / Challenges to Quitting Cigarettes"			1:02
8.	"Lion"		The Yellow Princess	5:15
9.	"Dance of the Inhabitants of the Palace of King Philip XIV of Spain"		Death Chants, Breakdowns & Military Waltzes	5:31
10.	"View East from the B&O Railroad Viaduct and the Riggs Road Intersection"		The Yellow Princess	5:36
11.	"On the Sunny Side of the Ocean"		The Transfiguration of Blind Joe Death	3:31
12.	"The Great Santa Barbara Oil Slick"			6:36
13.	"In Christ There Is No East or West" (arr. Fahey)	Harry Burleigh; John Oxenham	Blind Joe Death	2:48
14.	"Announcement"			0:36
15.	"The Death of the Clayton Peacock"		The Transfiguration of Blind Joe Death	4:01
16.	"The Revolt of the Dyke Brigade"		Days Have Gone By	4:01
17.	"Magruder Park"		The Yellow Princess	9:52
Total length:				76:04

== Personnel ==
- John Fahey – guitar

Production notes

- Glenn Jones – producer, liner notes
- Dean Blackwood – associate producer
- Filippo Salvadori – executive producer
- Marcello Azevedo – mastering
- Nathan Russell – design
- Jim Anderson – photography
- Melissa Stephenson – photography
- Janet Hayes – photography
