= Sea Changes & Coelacanths: A Young Person's Guide to John Fahey =

Compilation album by John Fahey
- Released: November 21, 2006
- Genre: Folk, avant-garde
- Length: 127:54
- Label: Table of the Elements
- Producer: Jim O'Rourke, Jeff Hunt, Jon Philpot

John Fahey chronology
On Air (2005)	Sea Changes & Coelacanths: A Young Person's Guide to John Fahey (2006)	Vanguard Visionaries (2007)

Sea Changes & Coelacanths: A Young Person's Guide to John Fahey is a compilation album by American fingerstyle guitarist and composer John Fahey, released in 2006.

== History ==
Sea Changes & Coelacanths consists of the releases Womblife, Hard Time Empty Bottle Blues and Georgia Stomps, Atlanta Struts and Other Contemporary Dance Favorites. All three were released on the Atlanta label Table of the Elements.

Hard Time Empty Bottle Blues was originally released in 2003 as a one-sided clear-vinyl 12-inch vinyl LP. The recordings were taken from Fahey's Yttrium Festival live performance in Chicago in November 1996.

Included are essays by David Fricke, Jason Gross, Byron Coley, and Dave Grubbs.

== Reception ==
Professional ratings
Review scores
Source	Rating
Encyclopedia of Popular Music	4/5 stars
Pitchfork	8.6/10
Stylus	B+

In his Stylus review, music critic Stewart Voegtlin compares the "old" and "new" Fahey, and cited "the most striking music" as those tracks from Georgia Stomps" which provided Fahey "the chance to maintain his moving target status, eschewing big-bodied acoustic for shimmering electric." Regarding the tracks from Womblife, "It doesn’t always work: one often strains to hear the guitar over the invasive din." Hard Time Empty Bottle Blues sounds "...like the “old” Fahey: forlorn, ruminative, down on his luck. There was never really Old or New John. New John was always Old; the Old was always presented in brand New ways. So, raise a glass to neither: John was always at his best with a leg hanging over either side of the fence."

Critic Derek Taylor summed up the compilation writing "Those seeking the virtuosic Fahey of albums like God, Time and Causality will find him largely absent here, but the trade-off comes in a haunting set of performances that can swallow the listener whole, much like the ancient marine life named in the collection’s cryptic title."

Mark Masters, writing for Pitchfork referred to Hard Time Empty Bottle Blues as an "afterthought", but also "...in its own small way, it's perfect, filled with the kind of labyrinthine figures, ringing tones, and deft shifts that mark Fahey's best work." and summarizes the compilation as Fahey "... [refusing] to abandon his fickle muse even this late in life, making Sea Changes and Coelacanths a vital curve in the winding path left by his staggering oeuvre."

== Track listing ==
All songs by John Fahey unless otherwise noted.

CD 1

1. "Sharks" – 9:20
2. "Planaria" – 9:54
3. "Eels" – 6:14
4. "Coelacanths" – 7:31
5. "Juana" – 12:35
6. "Hard Time Empty Bottle Blues I" – 2:18
7. "Hard Time Empty Bottle Blues II" – 3:05
8. "Hard Time Empty Bottle Blues III" – 1:34
9. "Hard Time Empty Bottle Blues IV" – 2:24

CD 2

1. "The House of the Rising Sun/Nightmare" (Public Domain, Artie Shaw) – 19:08
2. "Juana/Guitar Lamento" (Fahey, Bola Sete) – 17:05
3. "Red Rocking Chair" (Public Domain) – 9:25
4. "Song for Sara" – 6:19
5. "Son House/Marilyn/My Prayer/Mood Indigo" (Public Domain, Fahey, Georges Boulanger, Jimmy Kennedy, Duke Ellington, Barney Bigard) – 21:04

== Personnel ==
- John Fahey – guitar

Production notes:

- Jim O'Rourke– producer, engineer
- Jon Philpot – producer
- Jeff Hunt – producer, executive producer
- Kriss T. Johnson Jr – executive producer
- David Daniel – engineer
- Chris Griffin – mastering
- Andrew Burnes – editing
- Bettina Herzner – photography
- Linda Kalin – booklet design
- Bradly Brown – graphic design
- Naomi Yang – art direction
- Susan Archie – art direction
- Jon Brouchoud – cover illustration
- Byron Coley – liner notes
- David Fricke – liner notes
- Jason Gross – liner notes
- David Grubbs – liner notes
