= The Best of the Vanguard Years (John Fahey album) =

Greatest hits album by John Fahey
- Released: July 7, 1999
- Recorded: 1967–1968
- Genres: American Primitivism, New Acoustic
- Length: 72:14
- Label: Vanguard
- Producers: John Fahey, Samuel Charters

John Fahey chronology
Georgia Stomps, Atlanta Struts and Other Contemporary Dance Favorites (1998)	The Best of the Vanguard Years (1999)	Hitomi (2000)

The Best of the Vanguard Years is a compilation album by American fingerstyle guitarist and composer John Fahey, released in 1999.

== History ==
The Best of the Vanguard Years contains the complete album The Yellow Princess and all of Requia except for "Requiem for Molly, Pt. 1" and "Requiem for Molly, Pt. 2". Vanguard had previously released both albums with modified track listings in 1974 on The Essential John Fahey (both differing LP and CD versions) and would again in 2007 with a different combination of tracks on Vanguard Visionaries.

== Reception ==
Professional ratings
Review scores
Source	Rating
AllMusic	4/5 stars
Encyclopedia of Popular Music	3/5 stars
PopMatters	8/10 stars

In the PopMatters review, the staff wrote the CD "can, with the ensuing years’ recognition of difficult popular artists, be set next to such crowd-pleasers as Leo Kottke and not seem that out of place... His performances for Vanguard are challenging, but in a way that we have now assimilated." Andy Battaglia of Salon.com called the compilation "an adequate, though limited, introduction to John Fahey" while also stating "His music can be placed neatly within an indigenous folk tradition, but also alongside the most carefully considered examples of harmony's inherent power. As a great folk-song writer, Fahey was a great composer."

Matt Fink, writing for AllMusic called the compilation "an excellent overview of Fahey's tenure on the Vanguard label and also documents an impressively innovative period for the experimental guitarist. Mysterious, groundbreaking, mind-bending, and nearly disorienting, Fahey's unique genius is on display throughout the 70-plus minutes of mostly solo acoustic tracks. Taking country blues on a dizzying and occasionally unsettling journey, this is pretty revolutionary material, even if it all doesn't rank with the very best in his catalog."

== Track listing ==
All songs by John Fahey.

1. "The Yellow Princess" – 4:52
2. "View (East from the Top of the Riggs Road/B&O Trestle)" – 4:56
3. "Lion" – 5:10
4. "March! For Martin Luther King" – 3:43
5. "The Singing Bridge of Memphis, Tennessee" – 2:53
6. "Dances of the Inhabitants of the Invisible City of Bladensburg" – 4:10
7. "Charles A. Lee: In Memoriam" – 4:02
8. "Irish Setter" – 7:17
9. "Commemorative Transfiguration and Communion at Magruder Park" – 5:58
10. "Requiem for John Hurt" – 5:08
11. "Requiem for Russell Blaine Cooper" – 8:55
12. "When the Catfish Is in Bloom" – 7:40
13. "Fight on Christians, Fight On" – 2:03
14. "Requiem for Molly, Pt. 3" – 2:32
15. "Requiem for Molly, Pt. 4" – 2:55

== Personnel ==
- John Fahey – guitar
- Mark Andes – guitar, bass
- Jay Ferguson – organ, piano, keyboards
- Kevin Kelley – drums

Production notes

- Barry Hansen – producer, engineer
- John Fahey – producer
- Samuel Charters– executive producer, engineer
- Tom Vickers – producer
