= Fare Forward Voyagers (Soldier's Choice) =

Studio album by John Fahey
- Released: 1973
- Studio: United Recording Corp., Hollywood, CA
- Genre: American primitive guitar
- Length: 44:13
- Label: Takoma
- Producer: John Fahey

John Fahey chronology
After the Ball (1973)	Fare Forward Voyagers (Soldier's Choice) (1973)	The Essential John Fahey (1974)

Alternate cover
- Cover of the Shanachie CD release

Fare Forward Voyagers (Soldier's Choice) (or simply, Fare Forward Voyagers) is an album by American fingerstyle guitarist and composer John Fahey, released in 1973. It contains three songs, one comprising a complete side of the original LP.

== History ==
Following the fulfillment of his two-album contract with Reprise Records and lackluster sales, Fahey was released from Reprise and went back to recording for his own Takoma label.

Fahey originally dedicated the album to Swami Satchidananda, but later said the primary reason he was involved with the "spiritual community in the mountains of Lake County, Northern California" was because he was in love with the Swami's secretary. Relating the background to the recording of Fare Forward Voyagers to Byron Coley in his article "The Persecutions and Resurrections of Blind Joe Death", Fahey recalled "Probably the primary reason I got involved with them was that I fell in love with Swami Satchidananda's secretary, Shanti Norris. So, I was doing benefits for them, hoping to score points with her, and along the way I learned a lot of hatha yoga. I could go over there and get food any time I liked. I didn’t believe in Krishna or anything. It was like being in the middle of The Thief of Bagdad.”

The album and song titles are from American poet T.S. Eliot’s Four Quartets set of poems. Fahey later said the songs were "too demanding" to play live.

An earlier version of the title track was released on the 2006 reissue of The Yellow Princess. Themes from "Requiem for Russell Blaine Cooper", "When the Catfish Is In Bloom", and "Dalhart, Texas 1967" can be found in the three songs.

== Reception ==
Professional ratings
Review scores
Source	Rating
AllMusic	4/5 stars
The Encyclopedia of Popular Music	4/5 stars
The Great Folk Discography	7/10
MusicHound Folk	3/5 stars
Record Collector	4/5 stars
The Rolling Stone Album Guide	3.5/5 stars
Spin Alternative Record Guide	9/10

Fare Forward Voyagers received generally positive reviews from music critics. Reviewing the album for AllMusic, Eugene Chadbourne compared it to Indian ragas, but noted a divergence, stating that "the compositions are something in the order of unpredictable miniature symphonies, each with different sections, variations, and developments." Chadbourne also praises the engineering, writing that "the superb sound on the guitar; the brightly ringing high strings is something that can be heard on many Fahey recordings, but the deeply rich bass string sound is distinct and particularly effective."

Record Collector reviewer Grahame Bent praised the reissue, stating, "Overall, the influence of Indian ragas is clearly audible both in Fahey’s playing and his compositional approach ... the supreme meditative power of Fahey’s playing speaks eloquently for itself on this stunning blend of Zen minimalism and good old fashioned virtuosity."

== Reissues ==
- Fare Forward Voyagers was reissued on CD by Shanachie Records in 1992 with new artwork.
- Fare Forward Voyagers was reissued on CD in 2007 by Ace Records.

== Track listing ==
All songs by John Fahey.

Side one

1. "When the Fire and the Rose Are One" – 13:55
2. "Thus Krishna on the Battlefield" – 6:36

Side two

1. "Fare Forward Voyagers" – 23:42

== Personnel ==
- John Fahey – guitar

Production notes

- Douglas Decker – engineer
- Steve Guy – mastering
- Jon Monday – original cover art
- Stefan Grossman – art direction (reissue)
- Josephine Ayres – photography
- Robert Vosgien – digital mastering
