= The Dance of Death & Other Plantation Favorites =

Studio album by John Fahey
- Released: 1965
- Recorded: August 22–24, 1964
- Studio: Adelphi (Silver Spring, Maryland)
- Genre: American primitivism
- Length: 45:52
- Label: Takoma
- Producer: ED Denson

John Fahey chronology
Death Chants, Breakdowns & Military Waltzes (1963)	The Dance of Death & Other Plantation Favorites (1965)	The Transfiguration of Blind Joe Death (1965)

Alternative Cover
- Cover of the 1968 release

The Dance of Death & Other Plantation Favorites (originally issued as Vol. 3: The Dance of Death & Other Plantation Favorites) is the third album by American fingerstyle guitarist and composer John Fahey, released in 1965. The 1999 reissue contained four previously unreleased tracks.

== History ==
In the early 1960s, Fahey was enrolled in the graduate program in folklore studies at UCLA. In the summer of 1964, along with Bill Barth and Henry Vestine, Fahey visited the South where they "rediscovered" blues great Skip James. Fahey and ED Denson formally created Takoma Records in 1963. With increased distribution, Fahey's albums began to enjoy increased sales and popularity, though he had not as yet publicly performed on stage. As Matt Hanks stated in his article "Age Against the Machine" for No Depression, "For some reason, the hippies loved it." For his part, Fahey stated in his liner notes for his 1996 release City of Refuge, "I do hope that nobody will try to make me out as a child of the sixties. I was playing what I play before and after the sixties. This period had very little influence on me. I was never a hippie, and had no hippie friends."

The album was recorded at Adelphi Studios by Gene Rosenthal. Rosenthal would later create Adelphi Records, naming his label after Fahey's song "The Downfall of the Adelphi Rolling Grist Mill". He also claimed three other unused tracks from these sessions were used on subsequent releases by Fahey. Over 30 songs were recorded during the three-day sessions.

Of the sessions, Fahey recalled, ""It was an interesting session. It was the only one I ever did on marijuana and whiskey. It was kind of bouncy, you know. Another reason for that—I didn't actually own a good guitar at that time, so I was using Bill Barth's guitar, which was a big J-something Gibson and it had a real high action, so I couldn't hold the strings down very well."

"The Last Steam Engine Train" was covered by Leo Kottke on his 1969 album 12-String Blues and again on his 1973 album Greenhouse.

"On the Banks of the Owchita" is a duet with guitarist Bill Barth which uses a musical refrain composed by Ravi Shankar (credited in the liner notes) for Satyajit Ray's The World of Apu. The 1999 reissue bonus track "Steel Guitar Rag" is based on "Guitar Rag", Sylvester Weaver's original version of the song. "Wine and Roses" was later re-titled as "The Red Pony". "Poor Boy" became a Fahey standard.

Fahey continued writing liner notes in a similar vein as his previous two releases, attributing them to "Elijah P. Lovejoy". The notes were extensive, pseudo-academic, and humorous—all included in a booklet, which would often be the case on early releases by Fahey. Andy Beta, of The Village Voice described Fahey's liner notes in a 2006 article: "Doctoring loquacious, ludicrous liner notes for his self-released work that tempered his arrogant self-mythologizing with hilarious self-effacement, he mocked the academic bluster of scholars and revivalists. He renames his Fonotone patron "Joseph Buzzard," records as Blind Joe Death, or else espouses his work as "expert" Elijah P. Lovejoy." and noise guitarist and writer Alan Licht noted that Fahey "did as much to take folk out of the hands of squares as his music did," and he suffered lightly those that pined for the past."

The notes on The Dance of Death included an extensive discography and the basic theme of the notes is the search for John Fahey and his musical legacy:

"Prior to his discovery in 1958 by a Takoma research team Fahey had played as a guitarist for a bluegrass band; often appearing with Bill Hancock and Greg Eldridge, but no recordings are known from this period. Sometime in 1956 he was smote to the ground by a bolt of lightning. Upon awakening he heard Blind Willie Johnson singing and from that time onward he ceased playing hillbilly and concentrated upon blues. His first recordings were made under somewhat mysterious circumstances for the Fonotone company—a pioneer in the folkfield.

Shortly before she met her tragic end by impalement when a chair rung she was tuning slipped from place under terrific pressure, Mrs Petranick informed us that John had the knowledge to operate recording equipment and that he was a hypnotist. Evidently, he would go to Fonotone with Blind Joe Death and Blind Thomas. The next morning the A & R man would awaken with a slight headache and a stack of unidentified masters. Needless to say this has left some ambiguity in the records of the company. We have here listed all recordings made by any of these artists, regardless of the name used on the label. While doubtless some of them are by Death or Thomas or even Firk, all of them are of considerable merit and we felt it best to take the risk of including a few too many, rather than risk leaving any out."

== Reception ==
Professional ratings
Review scores
Source	Rating
AllMusic	3/5 stars 4/5 stars
The Encyclopedia of Popular Music	('64) ('67)
The Great Folk Discography	7/10
The Rolling Stone Album Guide	3.5/5 stars
Spin Alternative Record Guide	8/10

In the liner notes for the 1999 reissue, Lee Gardner comments that it "represents the first, best recorded declaration from Fahey that he was interested in transforming his music into a vehicle for personal expression that built on his influences but accepted none of their prosaic boundaries. Nowadays this sort of concept is a given. But it didn't exist until Fahey took it on, and precious few of those who have followed him took it farther than he did."

In reviewing The Dance of Death & Other Plantation Favorites for AllMusic, music critic Richie Unterberger called it "one of Fahey's less eccentric early efforts, featuring relatively straightforward instrumentals showcasing his deft finger work and occasional keening slide."

In his review of the 1999 reissue, Alex Henderson called the CD "essentially a folk album, but a folk album with strong country and blues leanings... this album makes it clear that even back in 1964 Fahey was quite original."

Music critic Ivan Emke referred to the original album as "the one that helped to launch his reputation. Much of it is inspired by the country blues and Delta sounds that he had been drawn to, and yet it was obvious that Fahey [was] taking the tunes to places they hadn't been before ... a classic; it provides a snapshot of a musician in transition."

In 2013, Spin included the album on their list of "The Top 100 Alternative Albums of the 1960s", calling it "a gorgeous, holistic, and wildly exploratory album, the reverberations of which continue to bubble up everywhere—from William Tyler and Daniel Bachman to Matt Valentine and beyond."

== Reissues ==
- The original cover of The Dance of Death & Other Plantation Favorites was simply a white cover with black lettering of the title. It was reissued by Takoma in 1967 with new artwork similar in style to that of the 1967 reissues of Blind Joe Death and Death Chants, Breakdowns & Military Waltzes.
- The Dance of Death & Other Plantation Favorites was reissued by Takoma in 1999 on CD with four bonus tracks.

== Track listing ==
All songs credited to John Fahey unless otherwise noted.

Side one

1. "Wine and Roses" – 3:28
2. "How Long" – 2:55
3. "On the Banks of the Owchita" – 3:52
4. "Worried Blues" – 2:24
5. "What the Sun Said" – 10:11

Side two

1. "Revelation on the Banks of the Pawtuxent" – 2:34
2. "Poor Boy" (Fahey, Bukka White) – 3:19
3. "Variations on the Coocoo" (arr: Fahey, Clarence Ashley) – 4:00
4. "The Last Steam Engine Train" – 2:18
5. "Give Me Corn Bread When I'm Hungry" – 3:12
6. "Dance of Death" – 7:39

1999 reissue bonus tracks:

12. "Tulip (AKA When You Wore a Tulip and I Wore a Big Red Rose)" (Arr: Fahey, Jack Mahoney, Percy Wenrich) – 2:43
13. "Daisy Bell (A Bicycle Built for Two)" (Arr: Fahey, Harry Dacre) – 1:20
14. "The Siege of Sevastopol" (Arr: Fahey) – 1:22
15. "Steel Guitar Rag" (Traditional) – 2:10

== Personnel ==
- John Fahey – guitar
- Bill Barth – guitar ("On the Banks of the Owchita")

Production notes:

- ED Denson – producer
- Gene Rosenthal – engineer
- Bill Belmont – reissue producer
- Joe Tarantino – remastering
- John Fahey – original liner notes
- Lee Gardner – reissue liner notes
- Tom Weller – original design
- Deb Sibony – reissue design
- Jamie Putnam – reissue art direction
