= Let Go (John Fahey album) =

Studio album by John Fahey
- Released: 1984
- Recorded: February–March 1983
- Studio: High Tech Recorders, Portland, OR
- Genre: Folk
- Length: 42:42
- Label: Varrick
- Producer: Terry Robb

John Fahey chronology
Railroad (1983)	Let Go (1984)	Rain Forests, Oceans and Other Themes (1985)

Let Go is an album by American fingerstyle guitarist and composer John Fahey, released in 1984. It was his first release on the Varrick label after over 25 years on his own label Takoma, as well as a few releases on other labels.

== History ==
Since his move to Salem, Oregon, in 1981, Fahey met guitarist and producer Terry Robb, who accompanies him on all but three of the songs on Let Go. He would work with Robb on three subsequent releases. Since his final album on Takoma (Railroad) Fahey had signed with Varrick Records, an imprint of Rounder Records. It was to be his first of four releases on the label.

His liner notes distance himself from the folk music label he had had since his career began. The notes begin "No folk music on this record—not even that sounds or suggest folk music... it's hard to break out of a bag I never intended to be in—never thought I was in... I'm not a Volk. I'm from the suburbs." He also noted the influence of the Brazilian guitarist Bola Sete. He had commented on Sete's influence in 1977 in the notes to his guitar transcription book The Best of John Fahey 1959–1977. He did his first cover of a Sete composition on his 1979 album John Fahey Visits Washington D.C..

He had previously recorded the "River Medley" on the 1972 Reprise release Of Rivers and Religion. "Dvorak" is based on themes from Antonín Dvořák's Eighth and Ninth symphonies. Regarding the duo's cover of the Derek and the Dominos song "Layla", Fahey commented: "Talk about ambition, Chutzpah—that’s us."

The original LP lists a track titled "Lost Lake". There was never such a track.

== Reception ==
Professional ratings
Review scores
Source	Rating
AllMusic	3/5 stars
The Encyclopedia of Popular Music	3/5 stars
The Rolling Stone Album Guide	3.5/5 stars

AllMusic critic Richard Foss wrote that Let Go "may not be the definitive John Fahey album, but it is a very good one from end to end." CMJ New Music wrote that "you'll find this one to be subtley radiant, tropically blue and exceptionally calming."

== Track listing ==
1. "Let Go" [original title in Portuguese: Canto de Ossanha] (Baden Powell) – 6:34
2. "Black Mommy" (Chargas, Martius) – 8:04
3. "Dvořák" (Traditional) – 4:04
4. "The World Is Waiting for the Sunrise" (Gene Lockhart, Ernest Seitz) – 2:30
5. "Medley: Deep River/Ol' Man River" (Traditional, Oscar Hammerstein II, Jerome Kern) – 4:53
6. "Lights Out" (John Fahey, Terry Robb) – 2:44
7. "Pretty Afternoon" (Bola Sete) – 3:05
8. "Sunset on Prince George's County" (Fahey) – 4:13
9. "Layla" (Eric Clapton, Jim Gordon) – 5:15
10. "Old Country Rock" (Traditional) – 1:20

== Personnel ==
- John Fahey – guitar
- Terry Robb – guitar, bottleneck guitar on "Let Go," "Dvořák," River Medley," Lights Out," Pretty Afternoon," "Layla," and "Old Country Rock"
- Johnny Riggins - percussion on "River Medley" and "Lights Out"
- Ron "Dr." Manfredo - bass on "River Medley"

Production notes

- Terry Robb – producer
- Jack Barr – engineer
- Jeff Rawson – assistant engineer
- Glenn Berger – mastering
- Melody Fahey – photography
