= Vanguard Visionaries (John Fahey album) =

Compilation album by John Fahey
- Released: June 12, 2007
- Recorded: 1967–1968
- Genre: Folk, avant-garde
- Length: 51:13
- Label: Vanguard
- Producer: Sam Charters, John Fahey, Barrett Hansen

John Fahey chronology
Sea Changes & Coelacanths: A Young Person's Guide to John Fahey (2006)	Vanguard Visionaries (2007)	Twilight on Prince Georges Avenue: Essential Recordings (2009)

Vanguard Visionaries is the title of a compilation recording by American fingerstyle guitarist and composer John Fahey, released in 2007.

== History ==
Vanguard Records had a high profile during the 1960s folk revival and released music by many folk artists such as Doc Watson, Odetta, and many others. To celebrate their 60th anniversary, Vanguard had released a series of artist samplers called Vanguard Visionaries from the 1960s and early-'70s era. Each contained a small track listing, and all the tracks are available on other compilation packages.

Fahey recorded two albums for Vanguard: The Yellow Princess and Requia.

== Reception ==
Professional ratings
Review scores
Source	Rating
AllMusic	3.5/5 stars

AllMusic critic Thom Jurek favorably reviewed the album, writing "[Fahey] is forever unpredictable, no matter how often one hears these songs. His playing is simply the element of imagination and surprise itself. While it's true that "Requiem for Milly [sic]," may be off-putting for those looking for a real introduction to Fahey, this is his earliest experimentation with the electronic sounds he explored a great deal more in his later career, and stands as a singular moment in his catalog."

== Track listing ==
All songs written by John Fahey.

1. "Lion" – 5:10
2. "March! For Martin Luther King" – 3:43
3. "Requiem for John Hurt" – 5:09
4. "Dance of the Inhabitants of the Invisible City of Bladensburg" – 4:10
5. "The Yellow Princess" – 4:51
6. "Irish Setter" – 7:16
7. "Requiem for Molly, Pt. 1" – 7:40
8. "Requiem for Molly, Pt. 2" – 7:45
9. "Requiem for Molly, Pt. 3" – 2:33
10. "Requiem for Molly, Pt. 4" – 2:56

== Personnel ==
- John Fahey – guitar

Production notes:

- John Fahey – producer
- Samuel Charters – producer
- Barrett Hansen – producer
- Vince Hans – compilation producer
- Georgette Cartwright – creative services director
- Amy L. Von Holzhausen – package design
