= Hitomi (album) =

Studio album by John Fahey
- Released: 2000
- Genres: Folk, avant-garde
- Label: LivHouse Records
- Producer: John Fahey

John Fahey chronology
The Best of the Vanguard Years (1999)	Hitomi (2000)	Red Cross (2003)

Professional ratings
Review scores
Source	Rating
Encyclopedia of Popular Music	3/5 stars

Hitomi is an album by American fingerstyle guitarist and composer John Fahey, released in 2000. It was also issued on the Cargo label and reissued in 2004 on the Important Records label. Hitomi was Fahey's last official release prior to his death in 2001.

== History ==
Hitomi continues Fahey's interest in sound collages and experimental music. It was his last official release prior to his death in 2001.

"Hitomi Smiles" is an unreleased song from the sessions for Old Girlfriends and Other Horrible Memories and "A History of Tokyo Rail Traction" is by the John Fahey Trio from a live session for KBOO Radio. Fahey would go on to release two more albums with the Trio; John Fahey Trio KBOO and John Fahey Trio, Vol. One.

== Track listing ==
All songs by John Fahey unless otherwise noted.

1. "Delta Flight 53"
2. "Despair"
3. "Hitomi"
4. "Tanaka Jun"
5. "East Meets West"
6. "Hitomi Smiles"
7. "The Dance of the Cat People"
8. "A History of Tokyo Rail Traction/Delta Flight 54" (Fahey, Tim Knight, Rob Scrivener)

== Personnel ==
- John Fahey – guitar
- Tim Knight – keyboards ("A History of Tokyo Rail Traction")
- Rob Scrivener – bass ("A History of Tokyo Rail Traction")
