= Womblife =

Studio album by John Fahey
- Released: August 12, 1997
- Recorded: 1996
- Genre: Experimental, avant-garde
- Length: 45:29
- Label: Table of the Elements
- Producer: Jim O'Rourke, John Fahey

John Fahey chronology
The Mill Pond (1997)	Womblife (1997)	The Epiphany of Glenn Jones (1997)

Womblife is an album by American fingerstyle guitarist and composer John Fahey, released in 1997. It was one of three releases by Fahey that year.

== History ==
Womblife continues John Fahey's career resurgence, again bearing minimal resemblance to his earliest work. It incorporates sound collages and experimental music.

Working with Jim O’Rourke, Fahey taped Womblife in the younger musician’s bedroom. O'Rourke has been long associated with the experimental and improv scene, frequently citing Fahey as an influence on his work. Echo, loops and samples along with guitar are used in musique concrète, a style Fahey used as far back as 1968's Requia. O'Rourke plays guitar on "Juana".

== Reception ==
Professional ratings
Review scores
Source	Rating
AllMusic	4/5 stars
The Encyclopedia of Popular Music	3/5 stars
The Great Folk Discography	7/10

Womblife was one of three releases by John Fahey in 1997. All three (including the album City of Refuge and the EP The Mill Pond) were experimental and avant-garde and were unexpected by his long-time fan base. Music critic Brian Olewnick of AllMusic highly recommended the release, writing, "This is not your father's John Fahey", and calling it "one of the more overtly experimental albums in the Fahey catalog and also one of the most fascinatingly beautiful." He cited "Juana" as a more conventional track.

Richard Gehr referred to it as "echoing", an "innovative electric album". Stewart Voegtlin of Stylus Magazine called it "... a complex record that marries musique concrete to bottleneck blues. It doesn’t always work: one often strains to hear the guitar over the invasive din."

== Reissues ==
- All of Womblife was reissued on the Table of the Elements 2006 compilation release Sea Changes & Coelacanths: A Young Person's Guide to John Fahey.

== Track listing ==
All songs by John Fahey.

1. "Sharks" – 9:20
2. "Planaria" – 9:54
3. "Eels" – 6:13
4. "Coelacanths" – 7:28
5. "Juana" – 12:34

== Personnel ==
- John Fahey – guitar, tapes
- Jim O'Rourke – guitar on "Juana"

Production notes:

- Jim O'Rourke – producer
- Jeff Hunt – artwork, design
- Susan Archie – artwork
- Bettina Herzner – photography
