= The Voice of the Turtle (album) =

Studio album by John Fahey
- Released: 1968
- Recorded: 1968
- Genre: American primitivism
- Length: 39:45
- Label: Takoma
- Producer: John Fahey

John Fahey chronology
Requia (1967)	The Voice of the Turtle (1968)	The Yellow Princess (1968)

The Voice of the Turtle is the seventh album by American guitarist John Fahey. Recorded and released in 1968, it is considered one of his more experimental albums, combining elements of psychedelia, early blues, country fiddles, ragas, and white noise with folk music. The album had many reissues with various track listings, jacket designs and mismatched titles.

== History ==
The mythical bluesman named Blind Joe Death, first introduced by Fahey on his debut album Blind Joe Death, appears again in the liner notes of The Voice of the Turtle. For years Fahey and Takoma continued to treat the imaginary guitarist as a real person, including booklets with their LPs containing biographical information about him and that he had taught Fahey to play.

The conceit that the blues guitarist Blind Joe Death was an actual person and contemporary of Fahey is carried further with some tracks credited to being performed by Death and Fahey. There is debate that Fahey never actually appears on some of the tracks and that they are instead old, little-known recordings. Fahey has been quoted as saying "That whole record was a hoax. On all the songs that say it's me it isn't and vice versa." Barry Hansen, a friend and collaborator of Fahey's albums told Rolling Stone reporter David Fricke that three of the tracks were old 78s that Fahey copied to tape and credited to Blind Joe Death. The first track "Bottleneck Blues" is a 1927 recording made by Sylvester Weaver and Walter Beasley. The tracks with fiddlers Hubert Thomas and Virgil Willis Johnston were made with Fahey during his 1966 trip to the South with Barry Hansen.

The Voice of the Turtle was reissued on CD in 1996. It was reissued on vinyl on the Four Men With Beards label in 2012. Both reissues use the second track listing.

== Packaging ==
The original LP release was a gatefold with the cover designed by Tom Weller. The original liner notes are extensive (the first sentence alone is 561 words long) and were included in a 12-page booklet, including photos in an old-time scrapbook format. Later pressings did not include the gatefold and booklet.

Voice of the Turtle has three quasi-subtitles on the cover. Directly underneath the main title is "Being a Musical Hodograph & Chronologue of the Music of John Fahey, including his most recent composition, The Story of Dorothy Gooch." On the right side of the cover appears "The Volk Roots & Hiart Leaves of John Fahey, Blind Joe Death, Hubert Thomas, Virgil Willis Johnston, L. Mayne Smith, Mark Levine." and directly below that "The Fahey Picture Album: Genuine photographs of Blind Joe Death, Knott's Berry Farm Molly, The Adelphi Rolling Grist Mill, Etc." When the gatefold was no longer produced, the "Fahey Picture Album" was replaced with a picture of a turtle.

The photograph labeled Blind Joe Death is actually a retouched old Vocalion Records advertisement of Blind Joe Taggart who recorded in the late 20s and 30s under several different names.

The back cover quotes a "Song of Solomon" verse "... and the voice of the turtle is heard in our land." After his death, the verse was printed in Fahey's funeral program.

The original 1968 release is the only version that has the correct match of the songs on the label, the actual songs on the vinyl, and on the back cover.

== Reception ==
Professional ratings
Review scores
Source	Rating
AllMusic	4.5/5 stars
DownBeat	4.5/5 stars
The Encyclopedia of Popular Music	4/5 stars
The Great Folk Discography	7/10
MusicHound Folk: The Essential Album Guide	4/5 stars
Q	3/5 stars
The Rolling Stone Album Guide	3.5/5 stars

Q stated in its December 1996 review: "Half of this 1968 album ...is made up of pleasant, traditionally styled instrumentals... But it's the three lengthy improvisational pieces that dominate, pointing forward to his later, more elliptical work..." In a November 1996 review in DownBeat it was rated 4.5 stars — Very Good/Excellent — "...has to be the strangest folk trip of the '60s... it's Fahey's loopy sound collages and odd sonic touches that make this largely instrumental album a treasure." It received three-and-a-half stars in The New Rolling Stone Album Guide.

In his AllMusic review, music critic Richie Unterberger wrote, "One of his more obscure early efforts, Voice of the Turtle is both listenable and wildly eclectic, going from scratchy emulations of early blues 78s and country fiddle tunes to haunting guitar-flute combinations and eerie ragas." He also wrote that its "undercurrent of dark, uneasy tension that gives much of Fahey's '60s material its intriguing combination of meditation and restlessness."

== Track listing ==
The credits given on the original album cover are shown in italics below. Two versions of the track listing were released. The notes on the songs are from The John Fahey Handbook, Vol. 1.

=== The Voice of the Turtle version one ===
==== Side one ====
1. "Bottleneck Blues" – 3:06
  - Blind Joe Death & John Fahey
  - This is a lo-fi recording with hissing and pops, and is actually an edited version of an old 78-rpm recording by Sylvester Weaver and Walter Beasley.
2. "Bill Cheatum" – 1:56
  - Hubert Thomas & John Fahey
3. "Lewisdale Blues" – 2:18
  - Nancy McClean & John Fahey
4. "Bean Vine Blues" – 2:45
  - Blind Thomas Curtis, Blind Joe Death & John Fahey
  - This is a lo-fi recording with hissing and pops. This is performed by Fahey on guitar and Joe Bussard on vocals.
5. "A Raga Called Pat, Part III" – 9:04
  - Tibetan Buddhist Monks, John Fahey & Gamblin' Gamelan Gong
  - Originally performed live by Fahey at the Ash Grove in Los Angeles with later sound effect overdubs.

==== Side two ====
1. "A Raga Called Pat, Part IV" – 4:28
  - Monks, Fahey & Gong
  - Originally performed live by Fahey at the Ash Grove in Los Angeles with later sound effect overdubs.
2. "Train" – 1:47
  - L. Mayne Smith & John Fahey
  - This includes Mark Levine on second guitar.
3. "Je Ne Me Suis Reveillais Matin Pas En May" – 2:22
  - Harmonica ED & John Fahey
  - Recorded live by Fahey with Ed Denson on harmonica.
4. "The Story Of Dorothy Gooch, Part I" – 5:27
  - John Fahey
  - This is a version of Fahey's song "Some Summer Day".
5. "Nine-Pound Hammer" – 1:59
  - Blind Joe Death & John Fahey
  - This is performed by Fahey on guitar and Joe Bussard on vocals.
6. "Lonesome Valley" – 1:42
  - Virgil Willis Johnston & John Fahey
  - Recorded in Bastrop, Louisiana in 1966 by Fahey and Johnston.

=== The Voice of the Turtle version two ===
Track changes, if any, are noted below the song title.

==== Side one ====
1. "Bottleneck Blues"
  - This is an un-edited version of the 78-rpm recording by Sylvester Weaver and Walter Beasley.
2. "Bill Cheatum"
3. "Lewisdale Blues"
4. "Bean Vine Blues"
  - This is a completely different song than what was found on the first version of The Voice of the Turtle. It is a guitar duet of Charlie Patton's "Moon Going Down".
5. "Bean Vine Blues #2"
  - This is a Scott Joplin song performed by The Blue Boys in 1928.
6. "A Raga Called Pat, Part III"
  - An edited version of the song performed live by Fahey at the Ash Grove in Los Angeles with later sound effect overdubs.

==== Side two ====
1. "A Raga Called Pat, Part IV"
  - An edited version of the song performed live by Fahey at the Ash Grove in Los Angeles with later sound effect overdubs.
2. "The Little Train That Couldn't"
  - This is actually "Memphis Stomp", performed and recorded by The Blue Boys in 1928.
3. "Je Ne Me Suis Reveillais Matin Pas En May"
4. "The Story Of Dorothy Gooch, Part I"
  - An edited version of Fahey's song "Some Summer Day".
5. "Nine-Pound Hammer"
6. "Lonesome Valley"

== Personnel ==
- John Fahey – guitar
- L. Mayne Smith – banjo (on "Train")
- Mark Levine – guitar (on "Train")
- Nancy McLean – flute
- Joe Bussard – vocals (uncredited)
- ED Denson – harmonica
