= On Air (John Fahey album) =

Live album by John Fahey
- Released: August 23, 2005
- Recorded: March 20, 1978, Bremen, Germany
- Genre: American primitivism
- Label: Tradition & Moderne
- Producer: Henry Kaiser

John Fahey chronology
The Great Santa Barbara Oil Slick (2004)	On Air (2005)	Sea Changes & Coelacanths: A Young Person's Guide to John Fahey (2006)

On Air is a live album by American fingerstyle guitarist and composer John Fahey, recorded in 1978 and released posthumously in 2005.

== History ==
The tracks from On Air come from a performance on Radio Bremen in Germany in 1978. The tapes were assembled and sequenced by producer Henry Kaiser.

== Reception ==
Professional ratings
Review scores
Source	Rating
AllMusic	4/5 stars
Encyclopedia of Popular Music	3/5 stars

AllMusic critic Thom Jurek wrote "Fahey spins out a musical universe that straddles musical worlds, dips into them, and carries the detritus somewhere else to make something entirely new yet rooted in time immemorial. This document is a welcome addition to the Fahey shelf and a must for fans."

== Track listing ==
All songs by John Fahey unless otherwise noted.

1. "On the Sunny Side of the Ocean" – 3:52
2. "Spanish Two-Step" – 2:09
3. "Lion" – 6:28
4. "Poor Boy a Long Way from Home" – 5:02
5. "Wine & Roses" – 4:17
6. "Steamboat Gwine 'Round de Bend" – 4:07
7. "Worried Blues" – 2:10
8. "Some Summer Day" – 3:26
9. "Candy Man" (Reverend Gary Davis) – 4:05
10. "Stomping Tonight on the Pennsylvania/Alabama Border" – 8:16
11. "In Christ There Is No East or West" (Traditional) – 8:05
12. "Beverly" – 11:42
13. "Requiem for John Hurt (Funeral Song for Mississippi John Hurt)" – 4:12

Contrary to the official track listing on the CD package, tracks 11 and 12 are incorrectly labelled. They should be as follows:

11. "In Christ There Is No East or West / Beverly"
12. "Dance Of The Inhabitants Of The Palace Of King Philip XIV Of Spain"

The description of "Beverly" as a 'slide guitar piece' in the liner notes is also inaccurate. This can be confirmed by listening to "Beverly" on 1973 album After the Ball, and "Dance of the Inhabitants of the Palace of King Philip XIV (of Spain)" on 1969 recording The Great Santa Barbara Oil Slick (also on 1964 album Death Chants, Breakdowns & Military Waltzes in shorter form).

== Personnel ==
- John Fahey – guitar

Production notes

- Henry Kaiser – producer, liner notes
- Dietram Köster – engineer
- Jürgen Kuntze – engineer
- Peter Schulze – engineer
- Klaus Schumann – engineer
- Rolf Kirschbaum – mastering
- Christine Potschkat – mastering
- R. Romanowski – mastering
- Michael Ochs – photography
