= Twilight on Prince Georges Avenue: Essential Recordings =

Greatest hits album by John Fahey
- Released: September 22, 2009
- Genre: Folk, avant-garde
- Length: 51:17
- Label: Rounder
- Producer: David Godowsky

John Fahey chronology
Vanguard Visionaries (2007)	Twilight on Prince Georges Avenue: Essential Recordings (2009)	Your Past Comes Back To Haunt You: The Fonotone Years 1958–1965 (2011)

Twilight on Prince Georges Avenue: Essential Recordings is the title of a compilation recording by American fingerstyle guitarist and composer John Fahey, released in 2009.

Fahey recorded four albums for Varrick Records, a division of Rounder Records, from which these selections are taken.

== Reception ==
Professional ratings
Review scores
Source	Rating
AllMusic	3.5/5 stars

AllMusic critic Thom Jurek favorably reviewed the album. In referring to the original releases as "given some marginal notice, but generally weren't regarded as among his best," he goes on to say "The ten selections compiled [here] and taken from those albums are proof that the critics were dead wrong. While Fahey may have been struggling with health issues and personal poverty, his guitar playing continued to reflect his sense of adventure and wry humor... Each selection here is worthy, and so were the albums they came from. This is an excellent introduction to an obscure period in the father of American Primitive guitar playing's strange, nearly mythological career."

== Track listing ==
All songs by John Fahey unless otherwise indicated.

1. "The Thing at the End of New Hampshire Avenue" – 3:33
2. "Atlantic High" – 2:09
3. "Dianne Kelly" – 7:45
4. "A Minor Blues" (Traditional) – 4:42
5. "Black Mommy" (Chargus, Martius) – 8:07
6. "Sunset on Prince George's County" – 4:16
7. "Twilight on Prince George's Avenue" – 4:09
8. "Rain Forest" – 6:48
9. "Improv in E Minor" – 7:31
10. "Love on Waikiki" – 2:17

== Personnel ==
- John Fahey – guitar
