= Proofs & Refutations =

Compilation album by John Fahey
- Released: September 8, 2023
- Recorded: 1995–1996
- Length: 42:25
- Label: Drag City
- Producer: Dean Blackwood, Rian Murphy

John Fahey chronology
Your Past Comes Back To Haunt You: The Fonotone Years 1958–1965 (2011)	Proofs & Refutations (2023)

Proofs & Refutations is a compilation album by American fingerstyle guitarist and composer John Fahey, released in 2023. It reissues Double 78 alongside four additional tracks.

== History ==
The album's notes indicate that its tracks were "recorded circa 1995/96, mostly in John Fahey's room at a Salem, Oregon boardinghouse". Tracks A3, A4, B2, and B3 were originally released in 1996 as Double 78 by Perfect Records.

== Reception ==
In his Spectrum Culture review, Reed Jackson noted that this material represents Fahey at a turning point in his musical career, describing the album as, "an enlightening link between the early and late periods, a tenuous bridge between two widely separated worlds." John Nicol described the opening track as "staggering [...] even after a hundred listens."

== Track listing ==
Side A

1. "All the Rains" – 5:43
2. "F for Fake" – 6:58
3. "Morning (Pt. 1)" – 4:13
4. "Morning (Pt. 2)" – 4:30

Side B

1. "For LMC 2" – 4:00
2. "Evening, Not Night (Pt. 1)" – 5:19
3. "Evening, Not Night (Pt. 2)" – 4:38
4. "Untitled (w/o rain)" – 7:04
