= Rain Forests, Oceans and Other Themes =

Studio album by John Fahey
- Released: 1985
- Recorded: November & December 1984
- Studio: Cascade Recording, Portland, OR
- Genre: Folk
- Length: 51:28
- Label: Varrick
- Producer: Terry Robb, John Fahey

John Fahey chronology
Let Go (1984)	Rain Forests, Oceans and Other Themes (1985)	I Remember Blind Joe Death (1987)

Rain Forests, Oceans and Other Themes is an album by American fingerstyle guitarist and composer John Fahey, released in 1985.

== Reception ==
Professional ratings
Review scores
Source	Rating
The Encyclopedia of Popular Music	3/5 stars
The Rolling Stone Album Guide	3.5/5 stars

CMJ New Music Monthly wrote that Fahey's "newest work is slightly more subdued than last year's Let Go, but equally as radiant. A nimble-fingered master... Fahey has continually created profound expressions on the acoustic guitar, in a mystical yet intimate setting".

== Track listing ==
Side one

1. "Melody McOcean" (Fahey) – 6:42
2. "Rain Forest" (Fahey) – 6:47
3. "Lullaby and Finale from the Firebird" (Igor Stravinsky) – 4:19
4. "Atlantic High" (Fahey) – 2:08
5. "Samba de Orfeo" (Luiz Bonfá) – 3:10

Side two

1. "Theme and Variations" (Louis Hardin) – 3:00
2. "May This Be Love/Casey Jones" (Jimi Hendrix, Furry Lewis) – 3:28
3. "Intro to Ocean Waves/Ocean Waves" (Fahey, Bola Sete) – 6:31
4. "Jiroscho Ascopi" (Fahey, Terry Robb) – 5:20
5. "Saint Patrick's Hymn" (Traditional) – 2:38

Note that both "Layla" and "The World Is Waiting for the Sunrise" were originally issued on the previous year's Let Go album, and did not appear on the vinyl release. They were added to the CD version several years later to give additional value.

== Personnel ==
- John Fahey – guitar
- Terry Robb – guitar, bottleneck guitar
- Guy Maxwell – percussion, drum machine
- Scott White – bass

Production notes

- John Fahey – producer
- Terry Robb – producer
- Bernie Grundman – mastering
- Susan Marsh – design
