= Your Past Comes Back To Haunt You: The Fonotone Years 1958–1965 =

Your Past Comes Back to Haunt You: The Fonotone Years, 1958–1965

Box set by John Fahey
- Released: October 10, 2011
- Recorded: 1958–1965
- Genre: Folk, avant-garde
- Length: 340:16
- Label: Dust-to-Digital
- Producer: Glenn Jones, Dean Blackwood, Steven Lance Ledbetter

John Fahey chronology
Twilight on Prince Georges Avenue: Essential Recordings (2009)	Your Past Comes Back to Haunt You: The Fonotone Years, 1958–1965 (2011)	Proofs & Refutations (2023)

Your Past Comes Back to Haunt You: The Fonotone Years, 1958–1965 is the title of a box set compilation of recordings by American fingerstyle guitarist and composer John Fahey, released in 2011.

== History ==
The collection consists of 115 tracks on five CDs. The mostly unreleased material was recorded for Joe Bussard's Fonotone label. The original reel-to-reel tapes used for 78-rpm records were remastered and a large amount of documentary data is included in an 88-page hardcover book. The project was completed by Glenn Jones, Dean Blackwood and Lance Ledbetter.

The tracks were recorded and released by Bussard, often using pseudonyms such as The Mississippi Stompers and Blind Thomas. Fahey was against releasing the material, stating "A lot of those recordings were made before I could play guitar."

== Reception ==
Professional ratings
Aggregate scores
Source	Rating
Metacritic	85/100
Review scores
Source	Rating
AllMusic	4/5 stars
Entertainment Weekly	A+
Pitchfork	9.5/10
Record Collector	5/5 stars

Reviews of the box set were positive, focusing on Fahey's collection of old material. Grayson Currin calls some of the material "as a curiosity at best" and will not stand up to repeated listenings. He also writes it is "a rich overview of America's musical bedrock-- only here, it's told through the hard-won, fast-paced development of a guitarist who, in turn, changed the way future players could consider their instrument. A must-have collection of lore, music, and history, it's a unified, brilliant, and often very challenging archive." David Dunlap, Jr. of the Washington City Paper wrote the box set "portrays Fahey, the American Primitive, a musician both vulgar and elegant, as the brilliant, beautiful mess that he was." Marc Medwin of Dusted Magazine wrote "If ever there was a box set to which the old chestnut “Warts and All” applied, it’s Your Past Comes Back to Haunt You. No one knows that better than Glenn Jones, the long-time John Fahey enthusiast and a compiler of this five-disc compendium of Fahey’s earliest recordings. He is the first to admit that some of this material is simply excruciating listening, but he is persuasive about its historical importance. The music ultimately proves him right."

The Wire named the box set its top archive release of the year.

== Track listing ==
=== Disk one ===
1. "Interview: John Fahey on Fonotone Records and Joe Bussard" – 2:59
2. "Franklin Blues" – 3:15
3. "Smoketown Strut " – 3:14
4. "Steel Guitar Rag" – 3:24
5. "Takoma Park Pool Hall Blues" – 3:31
6. "Buck Dancer's Choice (1)" – 3:19
7. "Medley: Pretty Polly/Shortnin' Bread" – 3:40
8. "Barbara Namkin Blues" – 3:13
9. "In Christ There Is No East or West" – 3:57
10. "Stak 'O Lee Blues (Louis Collins)" – 3:24
11. "The Transcendental Waterfall (1)" – 3:01
12. "John Henry (1)" – 3:09
13. "Over the Hill Blues (1)" – 3:57
14. "St. Louis Blues" – 4:06
15. "On Doing an Evil Deed Blues" – 3:29
16. "Reinumeration Blues (Brenda'sBlues) (1)" – 2:08
17. "The Transcendental Waterfall (2)" – 5:09
18. "Mississippi Boweavil Blues" – 2:46
19. "Green River Blues" – 2:59
20. "Over the Hill Blues (2)" – 2:44
21. "Libba's Rag" – 3:08
22. "Chris's Rag" – 3:14

=== Disk two ===
1. "St. Louis Tickle" – 3:12
2. "Pat Sullivan's Blues" – 3:24
3. "Blind Blues (a.k.a. Martin's Esso Blues)" – 2:41
4. "Poor Boy Blues" – 3:36
5. "Long Time Town Blues" – 3:29
6. "Gulf Port Island Blues" – 3:32
7. "Blind Thomas Blues, Pt. 1" – 3:20
8. "Blind Thomas Blues, Pt. 2" – 3:24
9. "New Newport News Blues #2" – 2:56
10. "Wanda Russell's Blues" – 3:20
11. "Going Away to Leave You Blues" – 3:13
12. "Lay My Burden Down" – 2:28
13. "Hill High Blues" – 3:06
14. "John Henry (2)" – 2:54
15. "Paint Brush Blues" – 3:18
16. "Blind Thomas Blues, Pt. 3" – 3:11
17. "Blind Thomas Blues, Pt. 4" – 3:29
18. "You Gonna Need Somebody on Your Bond" – 3:00
19. "Jesus Gonna Make Up My Dyin' Bed" – 3:11
20. "Banty Rooster Blues" – 3:13
21. "Tom Rushen Blues" – 3:35

=== Disk three ===
1. "Yallaboosha River Blues" – 3:43
2. "You Gonna Miss Me" – 3:20
3. "Wissenschaftlich River Blues, Pt. 1" – 3:17
4. "Wissenschaftlich River Blues, Pt. 2" – 3:28
5. "Zekiah Swamp Blues" – 3:25
6. "Nobody's Business" – 3:12
7. "Going Crabbing Talking Blues, Pt. 1" – 3:09
8. "Going Crabbing Talking Blues, Pt. 2" – 3:15
9. "You Better Get Right So God Can Use You" – 3:27
10. "Weissman Blues" – 3:06
11. "Dasein River Blues" – 3:12
12. "Racemic Tartrate River Blues, Pt. 1" – 3:11
13. "Racemic Tartrate River Blues, Pt. 2" – 3:13
14. "Smoky Ordinary Blues (1) (Dance of the Inhabitants (1))" – 3:01
15. "I Shall Not Be Moved" – 3:06
16. "Old Country Rock" – 3:11
17. "Little Hat Blues" – 3:19
18. "Guitar Solo Title Unknown (1)(Revelation on the Banks of the Pawtuxent" – 2:57
19. "Guitar Solo Title Unknown (2)(Night Train to Valhalla (1))" – 3:27
20. "Some Summer Day (2)" – 5:44
21. "The Langley Two-Step" – 1:37
22. "Dream of the Origin of the French Broad River" – 2:53

=== Disk four ===
1. "Saint John's Hornpipe" – 1:12
2. "Sail Away Ladies" – 1:16
3. "Dreaming Under the B & O Trestle" – 3:19
4. "900 Miles" – 4:36
5. "Prince George's Dance" – 2:59
6. "Improvisation for Flute and Guitar" – 3:33
7. "Dorothy/Calvert Street Blues(1) (Brenda's Blues (2))" – 1:40
8. "Brenda's Blues (3)" – 0:46
9. "Buck Dancer's Choice (2)" – 1:29
10. "Night Train to Valhalla (2)" – 4:22
11. "In the Pines" – 2:49
12. "Pretty Polly" – 3:31
13. "Take This Hammer" – 4:09
14. "Yazoo Basin Blues" – 6:38
15. "Stomping Tonight On the (Old)Pennsylvania/Alabama Border" – 3:47
16. "Smoky Ordinary Blues (2) (Dance of the Inhabitants (2))" – 2:22
17. "Revelation on the Banks of the Pawtuxent (2)" – 3:17
18. "Bean Vine Blues (Pea Vine Blues)" – 2:18
19. "Green Blues" – 2:46
20. "Stone Pony" – 2:49

=== Disk five ===
1. "Dorothy/Calvert Street Blues (2) (Brenda's Blues (4))" – 0:57
2. "Days Have Gone By" – 3:11
3. "Some Summer Day (2)" – 3:47
4. "Texas & Pacific Blues (My Bucket's Got a Hole in It)" – 2:09
5. "John Henry Blues" – 2:37
6. "Brenda's Blues (5)" – 1:49
7. "St. Patrick's Hymn" – 1:52
8. "Bicycle Built for Two" – 1:24
9. "The Blues You Saved for Me" – 1:35
10. "House Carpenter" – 1:30
11. "How Long (1)" – 2:25
12. "The Portland Cement Factory at Monolith, California" – 4:32
13. "You Take the E Train (The Last Steam Engine Train)" – 2:33
14. "I Sing a Song of the Saints of God" – 3:14
15. "How Long (2)" – 2:11
16. "O Jesus I Have Promised (1)" – 3:06
17. "[Untitled] (1)" – 1:09
18. "Medley: [Untitled] (2)/O Jesus I Have Promised (2)" – 3:24
19. "I Am a Rake and Rambling Boy" – 1:46
20. "Medley: Goodbye Old Paint (1)/Whoopee Ti-Yi-Yo, Git Along Little Doggies" – 1:25
21. "Goodbye Old Paint (2)" – 1:00
22. "Simple Gifts" – 0:53
23. "[Untitled] (3)" – 1:37
24. "Bury Me Not on the Lone Prairie" – 1:41
25. "Goodbye Old Paint (3)" – 1:16
26. "Western Medley" – 6:01
27. "Durgan Park" – 2:06
28. "The Bitter Lemon" – 2:46
29. "Old Southern Medley [Fragment]" – 0:12
30. "Bottleneck Blues" – 2:59

== Personnel ==
- John Fahey – guitar, veena, vocals
- Nancy McLean – flute

Production notes:

- Douglas Blazcek – liner notes
- Byron Coley – liner notes
- Eddie Dean – liner notes
- Claudio Guerrieri – liner notes
- Glenn Jones – liner notes
- Malcolm Kirton – liner notes
- R. Anthony Lee – liner notes
- Chris Downes – contributor
- Melissa Stephenson – contributor
