= The Best of John Fahey, Vol. 2: 1964–1983 =

Greatest hits album by John Fahey
- Released: February 3, 2004
- Genre: Folk
- Length: 1:19:16
- Label: Takoma
- Producer: Henry Kaiser

John Fahey chronology
Red Cross (2003)	The Best of John Fahey, Vol. 2: 1964–1983 (2004)	The Great Santa Barbara Oil Slick (2004)

The Best of John Fahey, Vol. 2: 1964–1983 is a compilation album by American fingerstyle guitarist and composer John Fahey, released in 2004.

== History ==
The second volume of The Best of John Fahey was assembled by American guitarist and composer Henry Kaiser. The album included three unreleased tracks from 1991; “Twilight on Prince George’s Avenue,” “Sligo Mud”, and “Tuff” which were assumed to be from an album Fahey recorded for Shanachie Records titled Azalea City Memories that was never released. However, it was later uncovered that the three songs were not Fahey recordings, but recordings of guitarist "Charlie Schmidt, a 42-year-old high school teacher who lives in Skokie... as part of a prank Fahey hoped to play on Shanachie, his label at the time."

The liner notes include a reprint of a letter that Fahey wrote to Fantasy Records regarding his thoughts on how they should handle his catalogue of recordings.

== Reception ==
Professional ratings
Review scores
Source	Rating
AllMusic	4.5/5 stars
The Encyclopedia of Popular Music	4/5 stars
The Rolling Stone Album Guide	4/5 stars

Music critic Thom Jurek of AllMusic praised the album, "This is, in some ways, better than the original best-of, because it comes from the heart of a fan as well as the vision of a master musician." All About Jazz critic Charlie B. Dahan called it "nothing more than a guitarist and his instrument communicating stories of love, passion, humor and despair with flesh and blood; wood and wire. It is music at its most basic, yet most complicated." Both praised the song selection and liner notes by producer Henry Kaiser.

== Track listing ==
All songs by John Fahey unless otherwise noted.

1. "Twilight on Prince George's Avenue" – 5:46
2. "Frisco Leaving Birmingham" – 3:30
3. "Sligo Mud" – 6:02
4. "Orinda-Moraga" – 3:57
5. "On the Beach at Waikiki" – 2:42
6. "Oneonta" – 2:34
7. "Dance of Death" – 7:39
8. "The Assassination of Stephan Grossman" – 2:15
9. "Tuff" – 5:07
10. "Ann Arbor/Death by Reputation" (Fahey, Leo Kottke) – 8:10
11. "Medley: Hark, The Herald Angels Sing/O Come All Ye Faithful" (Traditional) – 3:12
12. "The Approaching of the Disco Void" – 6:45
13. "Steamboat Gwine 'Round de Bend" – 4:54
14. "The Fahey Sampler" – 13:18
15. "Let All Mortal Flesh Keep Silence" – 3:25

== Personnel ==
- John Fahey – guitar

Production notes

- Henry Kaiser – producer
- John Fahey – producer
- ED Denson – producer
- Bill Belmont – liner notes
- Doug Decker – producer, engineer
- Barry Hansen – engineer
- Gene Rosenthal – engineer
- Joe Tarantino – remastering
- Jo Ayres – photography
- Linda Kalin – booklet design
- Jamie Putman – artwork, art direction
