= Red Cross (album) =

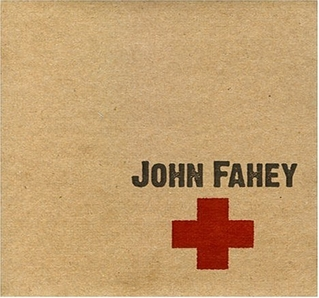

Studio album by John Fahey
- Released: February 11, 2003
- Recorded: 2000–2001
- Genre: Folk
- Length: 57:41
- Label: Revenant
- Producer: Dean Blackwood

John Fahey chronology
Hitomi (2000)	Red Cross (2003)	The Best of John Fahey, Vol. 2: 1964–1983 (2004)

Red Cross is the 33rd and final studio album by American fingerstyle guitarist and composer John Fahey, released posthumously in 2003. The Revenant Records catalog refers to the album's title as Red Cross Disciple of Christ Today.

== History ==
Red Cross was Fahey's last album, recorded a few months before his death in February 2001. The album was intended for release in 2001 but was delayed due to Fahey's declining health. The title was derived from a sermon recorded in 1928 by Rev. Moses Mason titled "Red Cross Disciple of Christ Today".

The CD includes a hidden track titled "Untitled with Rain", the majority of which is ambient noise of the empty recording studio. The liner notes are by Cul de Sac member and former collaborator Glenn Jones.

== Reception ==
Professional ratings
Review scores
Source	Rating
AllMusic	4/5 stars
The Boston Phoenix	4/4 stars
The Encyclopedia of Popular Music	3/5 stars
Entertainment Weekly	A−
The Guardian	4/5 stars
Pitchfork Media	7.3/10
The Rolling Stone Album Guide	2.5/5 stars
Uncut	4/5 stars

Again commenting on Fahey's "unpredictability", critic Jim Caligiuri states in his No Depression review that "there are expansive and decidedly nontraditional interpretations of such standards as Irving Berlin's 'Remember and George & Ira Gershwin's 'Summertime'. But there are also a couple of electric guitar musings that are equally haunting and full of intrigue."

Uncut stated Red Cross "...marks a surprising reconciliation with his old style... for contemplative rather than alienating ends [he] turns uptown standards... into spectral, rustic laments. A bewitching last testament.

In his AllMusic review, music critic Brandon Burke called it "a more personal and reflective approach... there are still a handful of effects and avant-garde dissonances on this recording but even these are used sparingly... these passages augment some of the most warm and vulnerable playing we've heard out of Fahey in a very long time... listeners unfamiliar with his more recent leanings will get an abbreviated taste of them here. A highly recommended, confusing, yet ultimately fitting end to a brilliant career. For Entertainment Weekly, Marc Weingarten wrote, "It sounds spacey and ancient at the same time—and it's all oddly moving."

Critic Eric Carr summed up his Pitchfork Media review, "Even if Red Cross is less of a striking conclusion than a broad summation, it's a tragedy to allow the vague recognitions elicited here to evaporate into nothing. It's silence in remembrance of a talented, haunted man, but he deserves a eulogy, and his guitar speaks better than anyone ever could."

== Track listing ==
All songs by John Fahey unless otherwise noted.

1. "Remember" (Irving Berlin) – 4:41
2. "Red Cross, Disciple of Christ Today" – 4:05
3. "Summertime" (George Gershwin, Ira Gershwin, DuBose Heyward) – 5:40
4. "Ananaias" – 7:31
5. "Motherless Child" (Traditional) – 8:22
6. "Charley Bradley's Ten-Sixty-Six Blues" – 3:23
7. "Untitled with Rain" – 24:00

== Personnel ==
- John Fahey – guitar
- Tim Knight – organ, chimes ("Untitled with Rain")
- Rob Scrivner – bass ("Untitled with Rain")

Production notes

- Dean Blackwood – producer
- Glenn Jones – liner notes
- Noel Waggener – artwork, design
