= I Remember Blind Joe Death =

Studio album by John Fahey
- Released: 1987
- Recorded: 1986 at Spectrum, Portland, Oregon
- Genre: Folk
- Length: 45:41
- Label: Varrick
- Producer: Tinh Mahoney

John Fahey chronology
Rain Forests, Oceans and Other Themes (1985)	I Remember Blind Joe Death (1987)	God, Time and Causality (1989)

I Remember Blind Joe Death is an album by American fingerstyle guitarist and composer John Fahey, released in 1987.

This album was later disregarded by Fahey, stating the album suffers from sloppy playing due to the Epstein–Barr virus he was suffering from at the time.

== Reception ==
Professional ratings
Review scores
Source	Rating
AllMusic	4/5 stars
The Encyclopedia of Popular Music	3/5 stars
New Musical Express	8/10
The Rolling Stone Album Guide	2.5/5 stars

CMJ New Music wrote that "The record is rooted in a deep delta blues sound-but that's certainly not where it ends.. Fabulous."

== Track listing ==
1. "The Evening Mysteries of Ferry Street" (Fahey) – 3:28
2. "You'll Find Her Name Written There" (Harold Hensley) – 1:36
3. "The Minutes Seem Like Hours, The Hours Seem Like Days" (Fahey) – 4:02
4. "Are You from Dixie?" (Traditional) – 2:45
5. "A Minor Blues" (Traditional) – 4:42
6. "Steel Guitar Rag" (Traditional) – 2:26
7. "Nightmare/Summertime" (Artie Shaw, George Gershwin, Ira Gershwin, DuBose Heyward, Dorothy Heyward) – 5:25
8. "Let Me Call You Sweetheart" (Beth Slater Whitson, Leo Friedman) – 2:12
9. "Unknown Tango" (Traditional) – 3:54
10. "Improv in E Minor" (Fahey) – 7:31
11. "Lava on Waikiki" (Fahey) – 2:18
12. "Gaucho" (Bola Sete) – 6:00

== Personnel ==
- John Fahey – guitar

Production notes

- Tinh Mahoney – producer
- Mike Moore – engineer
- Tom Coyne – mastering
- Susan Marsh – design
