= Railroad (album) =

- Cover of the mis-labeled Railroad.

Studio album by John Fahey
- Released: 1983
- Recorded: Dirk Dalton Studios, Los Angeles
- Genre: Folk
- Length: 37:26
- Label: Takoma
- Producer: John Fahey, Tom Davis

John Fahey chronology
Live in Tasmania (1981)	Railroad (1983)	Let Go (1984)

Railroad is an album by American fingerstyle guitarist and composer John Fahey, released in 1983. It was originally released as Railroad 1 by mistake. The Shanachie Records reissue is correctly labeled as Railroad. It was his last principal recording for Takoma Records, the label he founded in 1959.

== History ==
John Fahey had a lifelong attraction to trains and railroads. His long-time friend and collaborator Barry Hansen recalled in an interview about Fahey's initial move to Oregon, "He loved the green countryside. He was near a railroad track and he liked that. He loved to watch trains." In his original liner notes, Fahey writes of train yards, individuals related to trains, and memories of trains and railroads. Nearly every track title refers to a train or railroad.

Railroad was Fahey's last principal recording for Takoma Records, the label he founded in 1959. He cited the strain of running the label and its lack of direction as reasons for selling it to the UK-based Chrysalis Records. In a 1997 interview with Jason Gross, he stated "The reason that I got rid of it was almost everybody in the office started taking cocaine and I couldn't get rid of it. We weren't losing money or anything. We were still selling records. I made the terrible mistake of giving stock to the employees so I couldn't fire them. The only thing I could do was to dissolve the company. While I was doing that, Chrysalis offered to buy it and I said 'sure, take it.'" Other sources refer to Fahey's lack of interest in the business side of running Takoma, the company's debt, and the current poor business climate of the record industry.

"Life is Like a Mountain Railroad" is a version of the country song "Life's Railway to Heaven" by Charles Davis Tillman and M. E. Abbey.

== Reception ==
Professional ratings
Review scores
Source	Rating
AllMusic	3/5 stars
The Encyclopedia of Popular Music	4/5 stars
Record Collector	3/5 stars
Stylus Magazine	B+

In his Record Collector review, Terry Stauton called the music "twangily instrumental laments to the almost mythical trains of frontier America" and "perhaps an ideal starting point from which to further investigate his vast catalogue."

Critic Stewart Voegtlin praised the 2007 reissue in Stylus Magazine, singling out the tracks "Oneonta", "Imitation Train Whistles/Po' Boy" and "Afternoon Espee Through Salem". He commented Fahey "coasted through enough records; he labored honestly at others. Railroad undoubtedly shows both approaches, but holds enough magic in its shallow well to keep those that seek a bare bones account of the man that made it mired in stubborn stories that do little to lay the self-proclaimed 'primitive' bare."

In his liner notes for the Ace Records 2007 reissue, author Kris Needs calls Railroad "...a timelessly evocative tribute to America’s mighty man-made artery."

== Reissues ==
- Railroad was reissued on CD by Shanachie Records in 1992.
- Railroad was reissued on CD by Ace Records in 2007.

== Track listing ==
All songs by John Fahey unless otherwise noted.

1. "Frisco Leaving Birmingham" – 3:23
2. "Oneonta" – 2:28
3. "Summer Cat by My Door" – 4:11
4. "Steve Talbot on the Keddie Wye" – 4:31
5. "Afternoon Espee Through Salem" – 4:27
6. "Enigmas and Perplexities of the Norfolk and Western" – 3:10
7. "Charlie Becker's Meditation" – 3:20
8. "Medley: Imitation Train Whistles/Po'boy" – 4:53
9. "Life is Like a Mountain Railroad" (Traditional) – 2:13
10. "Delta Dog Through the Book of Revelation" – 4:50

== Personnel ==
- John Fahey – guitar

Production notes

- John Fahey – producer, original liner notes
- Tom Davis – producer, engineer
- Melody Fahey – cover photo
