= The John Fahey Christmas Album =

Studio album by John Fahey
- Released: 1991
- Label: Burnside; Attic
- Producer: Terry Robb, Don MacLeod

John Fahey chronology
God, Time and Causality (1989)	The John Fahey Christmas Album (1991)	Old Girlfriends and Other Horrible Memories (1992)

The John Fahey Christmas Album is an album by the American musician John Fahey, released in 1991. It was originally released by Burnside, a record store in Portland, Oregon.

The John Fahey Christmas Album was one of five Christmas albums recorded by Fahey. "O' Holy Night" was included on the Imaginational Anthem compilation.

== Production ==
The album was produced by Terry Robb and Don MacLeod.

== Critical reception ==
Professional ratings
Review scores
Source	Rating
AllMusic	3/5 stars
MusicHound Folk: The Essential Album Guide	4/5 stars
Spin Alternative Record Guide	7/10

The Province wrote that "the flute, piano and cello accompaniment creates a lithe, pleasant chamber-ensemble ambience." The Edmonton Journal opined that, "while it might be labelled part of the contemplative art form known as New Age, the music is rich, difficult and beautiful enough to impress non-aficionados of relaxation music." The Globe and Mail noted that "Fahey's warm, round tone glows like a Yule log at midnight and the balance between the familiar and obscure is delicate enough that the album can tug heartstrings without ever becoming cloying."

In 2017, Pitchfork, comparing the 1991 release to his earlier Christmas albums, wrote: "For Fahey, holiday music allowed for a sort of evolving emotional inventory and a dependable corrective for heavy feelings. It, like him, could change."

== Track listing ==
No.	Title	Length
1.	"Jingle Bells"
2.	"Angels from the Realms of Glory"
3.	"Silent Night"
4.	"Lo How a Rose E'er Blooming"
5.	"Irish Medley"
6.	"O' Little Town of Bethlehem"
7.	"Santisima"
8.	"Christ Is Born on Christmas Day"
9.	"O' Come Little Children/Ach Du Lieber Augustine"
10.	"Mary Had a Baby"
11.	"The Little Drummer Boy"
12.	"Good Christian Men Rejoice, Rejoice"
13.	"Spanish Carol"
14.	"O' Holy Night"
15.	"Christ Is Born as Child of Man"
16.	"Christmas Medley: I. "Samuel Barber's 'Largo'"; II. "It Came Upon a Midnight Clear"; III. "We Three Kings"; IV. "Greensleeves"; V. "In the Bleak Midwinter"; VI. "Hark! the Herald Angels Sing"; VII. "O Come All Ye Faithful"; VIII. "Samuel Barber's 'Largo'""
