= Georgia Stomps, Atlanta Struts and Other Contemporary Dance Favorites =

Live album by John Fahey
- Released: September 3, 1998
- Recorded: August 9, 1997
- Venue: Horizon Theatre (Atlanta)
- Genre: Folk
- Length: 73:05
- Label: Table of the Elements
- Producer: Jeff Hunt, Kristina Johnson

John Fahey chronology
The Epiphany of Glenn Jones (1997)	Georgia Stomps, Atlanta Struts and Other Contemporary Dance Favorites (1998)	The Best of the Vanguard Years (2000)

Georgia Stomps, Atlanta Struts and Other Contemporary Dance Favorites is a live album by American fingerstyle guitarist and composer John Fahey, released in 1998. It was the second and last live album he recorded and released during his lifetime.

== History ==
Georgia Stomps, Atlanta Struts and Other Contemporary Dance Favorites was recorded at the Horizon Theatre in Atlanta, Georgia, in 1997. It was Fahey's first album playing solo electric guitar and was recorded at the release party for his earlier 1997 release Womblife. George Winston, whom Fahey had signed and first recorded on Takoma Records stated regarding Fahey's switch to electric, "He exhausted everything that he wanted to do with the acoustic guitar." Fahey himself had stated that it was also due to age and easier on his fingers to play.

In his article "Looking for Blind Joe Death" for The Village Voice, writer Andy Beta described Fahey's performances of the period as "Fahey eschewed the acoustic steel-string altogether; he didn't even own a guitar, pawning it to make his rent. Due to the effects of Epstein-Barr syndrome and diabetes, his immaculate style slowed. Gone were the ornate five-finger rolls of a one-man orchestra as instead he swamped his tone in delay and reverb, stirring up fuliginous, phantasmal lines that slowly accrued in the air."

== Reception ==
Professional ratings
Review scores
Source	Rating
AllMusic	4/5 stars
The Encyclopedia of Popular Music	3/5 stars
Entertainment Weekly	A−

Music critic Brian Olewnick of AllMusic recommended the release, stating that "this performance, with its heavy blues basis and rich textural fabric, provides a direct confrontation with one of the most purely musical and idiosyncratic guitarists around." Tony Scherman of Entertainment Weekly called it "typically sardonic: This is as far from dance music as you'll get... Fahey's doing what he's always done: painting highly personal soundscapes, using American roots music as his palette".

== Track listing ==
1. "The House of the Rising Sun/Nightmare" (Public Domain, Artie Shaw) – 19:09
2. "Juana/Guitar Lamento" (Fahey, Bola Sete) – 17:06
3. "Red Rocking Chair" (Public Domain) – 9:26
4. "Song for Sara" (Fahey) – 6:20
5. "Son House/Marilyn/My Prayer/Mood Indigo" (Public Domain, Fahey, Georges Boulanger, Jimmy Kennedy, Duke Ellington, Barney Bigard) – 21:05

== Personnel ==
- John Fahey – guitar

Production notes

- Kristina Johnson– producer
- Jeff Hunt– producer, cover design
- Jon Philpot– engineer
- David Daniell– engineer
- Chris Griffin– mastering
- Susan Archie – artwork
- Bettina Herzner – photography
