= After the Ball (album) =

Studio album by John Fahey
- Released: 1973
- Recorded: 1971–1973
- Studio: United/Western Recorders, Hollywood, CA
- Genre: Folk
- Length: 35:21
- Label: Reprise
- Producer: John Fahey, Denny Bruce

John Fahey chronology
Of Rivers and Religion (1972)	After the Ball (1973)	Fare Forward Voyagers (Soldier's Choice) (1973)

After the Ball is an album by the American folk musician John Fahey, released in 1973. It was his second and last recording on the Reprise label and like its predecessor, Of Rivers and Religion, it sold poorly.

== History ==
Following in the same mold as Fahey's first album with Reprise, Of Rivers and Religion, accompanists were used on most of the material. Denny Bruce was once again co-producer and many of the musicians were the same. Jack Feierman again wrote the ensemble arrangements. Like Of Rivers and Religion, the Dixieland-style jazz danceband numbers were unlike anything else Fahey had done before. Following the fulfillment of the two-album contract and lackluster sales, Fahey was released from Reprise and went back to recording for his own Takoma label.

Speaking of both Of Rivers and Religion and After the Ball in a 1998 interview for The Wire, Fahey recalled, "I don't understand why they got bad reviews. It's like every time I wanted to do something other than play guitar I got castigated."

"Bucktown Stomp" is an adaptation of "Smoketown Strut" by the blues guitar player Sylvester Weaver. The version of "Candy Man" here is based on Reverend Gary Davis' version. Fahey later re-recorded "Hawaiian Two-Step" as "Spanish Two-Step".

The title song, "After the Ball" by Charles K. Harris, was popularized in Oscar Hammerstein II and Jerome Kern's 1927 musical Show Boat.

== Reception ==
Professional ratings
Review scores
Source	Rating
AllMusic	2.5/5 stars 4.5/5 stars
Christgau's Record Guide	A−
The Encyclopedia of Popular Music	3/5 stars
The Great Folk Discography	4/10
The Rolling Stone Album Guide	3/5 stars

In his AllMusic review, critic Jeff Schwachter wrote that "the album suffers from too many mood swings. Individually, however, the tunes are strong and the arrangements very accessible and light." He also noted, "The album cover and even the selected tunes and titles are cuttingly funny, but the songs themselves are played warmly and delivered with care, heartfelt arrangements, and a slightly satirical sentimentality."

The music critic Robert Christgau wrote, "I'd rather listen to this collection of standards and acoustic blues and rag inventions than any rock record this side of the Allmans and the New York Dolls. Conditionally guaranteed."

In a review of the reissue, the music critic Thom Jurek called it "a more up-tempo affair steeped in the Delta blues and in wildly varying New Orleans and bluegrass music."

== Reissues ==
After the Ball was reissued along with Of Rivers and Religion on CD in 2003 by Warner Bros. Records.

== Track listing ==
Side one

1. "Horses" (Fahey) – 2:07
2. "New Orleans Shuffle" (Bill Whitmore) – 3:17
3. "Beverly" (Fahey) – 4:48
4. "Om Shanthi Norris" (Fahey) – 5:49

Side two

1. "I Wish I Knew How It Would Feel to Be Free" (Billy Taylor, Dick Dallas, Fahey) – 2:35
2. "When You Wore a Tulip (And I Wore a Big Red Rose)" (Percy Wenrich, Jack Mahoney) – 2:33
3. "Hawaiian Two-Step" (Fahey) – 2:39
4. "Bucktown Stomp" (Fahey) – 2:14
5. "Candy Man" (Reverend Gary Davis) – 1:26
6. "After the Ball" (Charles K. Harris, Oscar Hammerstein II, Jerome Kern) – 3:39

== Personnel ==
- John Fahey – guitar
- Chris Darrow – guitar, fiddle
- Joel Druckman – double bass
- Dick Cary – piano, horn
- Joe Darensbourg – clarinet
- Jack Feierman – trumpet
- Peter Jameson – guitar
- John Rotella – saxophone
- Allen Reuse – banjo, mandolin, ukulele
- Britt Woodman – trombone

Production notes

- John Fahey – producer
- Denny Bruce – producer
- Jack Feierman – arranger
- Doug Decker – engineer
- Richie Unterberger – reissue liner notes
- Sherman Weisburg – photography
