= The Mill Pond =

EP by John Fahey
- Released: April 1997
- Genres: Experimental, avant-garde
- Label: Little Brother Records
- Producer: Scott Colburn

John Fahey chronology
City of Refuge (1997)	The Mill Pond (1997)	Womblife (1997)

The Mill Pond is a double-EP album by American fingerstyle guitarist and composer John Fahey, released in 1997. The release is a notable entry in Fahey's discography in that it features experimental music in the noise and drone styles.

== History ==
The Mill Pond was originally released as a double 7" vinyl record. Only 1000 were made and it immediately went out of print. It was reissued on CD by Important Records in 2007. The reissue included a collection of 32 of Fahey's paintings in a cardboard folio.

== Reception ==
Professional ratings
Review scores
Source	Rating
Allmusic	2/5 stars
Dusted Magazine	(not rated)

Stewart Mason states in his Allmusic review: "... a frustratingly inconsistent minor work that's primarily of interest to hardcore John Fahey fans and students of the 1990s noise rock underground." Dusted Magazine critic Bill Meyer wrote "No matter how you look at it, The Mill Pond is not a peak of John Fahey’s career... the music amongst the strangest and, in places, ugliest of his career."

== Track listing ==
All songs by John Fahey.

1. "Ghosts" – 5:47
2. "Garbage" – 10:40
3. "You Can't Cool Off in the Mill Pond, You Can Only Die – 3:37
4. "The Mill Pond Drowns Hope" – 7:05
