= The Yellow Princess (album) =

Studio album by John Fahey
- Released: 1968
- Recorded: 1968
- Studio: Sierra Sound Laboratories, Berkeley, CA
- Genre: American primitivism
- Length: 42:36
- Label: Vanguard
- Producer: John Fahey, Barrett Hansen

John Fahey chronology
| The Voice of the Turtle (1968) | The Yellow Princess (1968) | The New Possibility (1968) |

The Yellow Princess is the ninth album by American folk musician John Fahey. Released in 1968, it was his second and last release on the Vanguard label.

== History ==
The Yellow Princess was Fahey's second and last release on the Vanguard label. Denny Bruce, Fahey's manager, discussed the unwillingness of the label to provide a budget for additional musicians for Of Rivers and Religion with music critic Richie Unterberger, citing the reception of The Yellow Princess. "His deal was that he could record for Takoma 'experimental records,' but to try and make commercial recordings for Vanguard, with their approval of the budget. The Yellow Princess, which had other musicians on it, didn't sell,' etc." It was after this and prior to the recording of Of Rivers and Religion that Fahey was given his release from Vanguard.

The date of recording and release is disputed by various sources. The Fahey Files states it is believed to have been recorded the spring of 1968 and released that summer. Unterberger cites a 1969 release date in the Of Rivers and Religion reissue liner notes. The John Fahey Handbook, Volume 2 cites "late 1968 or January 1969" and the recording date as June 1968 at Sierra Sound Laboratories.

Fahey's original liner notes describe the genesis of the song "The Yellow Princess", which was based on the overture to the opera La Princesse Jaune (The Yellow Princess) by composer Camille Saint-Saëns. Fahey wrote: "I once managed to copy the main theme of a passage from "The Yellow Princess Overture"... This is a stabilized improvisation upon that passage. I began it in 1954 and completed it in December 1966, in Bastrop, La."

"The Singing Bridge of Memphis, Tennessee" is a musical collage done with the collaboration of Barry Hansen. The two had worked on sound collages on Fahey's prior Vanguard release, Requia. Fahey commented that "I didn't know how to mix things on tape recorders and make edits. Barry was more knowledgeable and intelligent than me." The recording utilizes a two-minute section from a recording of "Quill Blues" by Big Boy Cleveland.

Additional musicians Jay Ferguson and Mark Andes were members of the rock band Spirit. Kevin Kelley was a member of The Byrds for a brief period.

== Cover ==
The original unsigned painting for the cover was made by Charles McVicker. It includes images relating to the song titles and liner notes as well as the clipper ship "The Yellow Princess".

== Reception ==
Professional ratings
Review scores
| Source | Rating |
|---|---|
| AllMusic | 4.5/5 stars |
| The Encyclopedia of Popular Music | 4/5 stars |
| The Great Folk Discography | 8/10 |
| MusicHound Folk: The Essential Album Guide | 3.5/5 stars |
| Record Collector | 4/5 stars |
| The Rolling Stone Album Guide | 3/5 stars |
| Spin Alternative Record Guide | 7/10 |
| Stylus Magazine | A− |

The Yellow Princess and its reissue has received consistently positive critical reviews. Record Collector called it "a pleasant journey to take, rattling along with the odd surprising flourish to mark the way, a random piece of dissonance to keep you awake and, above all, a reassurance that you’re in safe hands." Critic Andrew Gaerig praised the reissue, claiming it "is exemplary of Fahey’s knack for exploiting his limited premise. The Yellow Princess is a hallmark not because it revolutionized Fahey’s sound, displayed an improved technique, or broke him to a wider audience. Rather, it was the combination of a particularly deft melodic touch... and a growing tendency to expand his sonic palette... that marks The Yellow Princess as one of Fahey’s most consistent, and ultimately enlightening works." Gaerig also notes the three previously unreleased tracks added are mostly noteworthy for “Steel Guitar Medley”, writing "The length and variety of the extras solidify The Yellow Princess as a fine starting point for any Fahey virgin."

Musician Eugene Chadbourne, writing for AllMusic, praised the recording sound especially, calling it "among the best of his many releases; at the proper volume, the effect is as if one had taken up residency inside the sound hole of a giant acoustic guitar." He singles out "View (East from the Top of the Riggs Road/B&O Trestle)" as one of Fahey's masterpieces, "on a par with Charles Ives for musical Americana."

Mason Jones of Dusted magazine especially praised the album for the title track, "March! For Martin Luther King" as well as "View" and especially "The Singing Bridge of Memphis, Tennessee" as unexpected musique concrète. Tracy Rogers of Music Box, called it an "experimental, innovative, and avant-garde ... seminal, minor-key, blues-folk recording."

In his liner notes for The Return of the Repressed, Barry Hansen noted Fahey's playing on The Yellow Princess as "some of the most technically accomplished playing of John's career."

== Reissues ==
- The Yellow Princess was reissued on CD by Vanguard in 2000, 2001, and 2004.
- The Yellow Princess was reissued on vinyl LP by Vanguard in 2008.
- All the tracks from The Yellow Princess plus four from Requia are available on The Essential John Fahey.
- All the tracks from The Yellow Princess were included in 1999 on the CD The Best of the Vanguard Years

== Track listing ==
All songs credited to John Fahey.

1. "The Yellow Princess" – 4:52
2. "View (East from the Top of the Riggs Road/B&O Trestle)" – 4:56
3. "Lion" – 5:10
4. "March! For Martin Luther King" – 3:43
5. "The Singing Bridge of Memphis, Tennessee" – 2:53
6. "Dances of the Inhabitants of the Invisible City of Bladensburg" – 4:10
7. "Charles A. Lee: In Memoriam" – 4:02
8. "Irish Setter" – 7:17
9. "Commemorative Transfiguration and Communion at Magruder Park" – 5:58
  2006 Reissue bonus tracks:
10. "The John Fahey Sampler, Themes and Variations"
11. "Fare Forward Voyagers"
12. "Steel Guitar Medley"

Many of the tracks quote other compositions, or are improvisations based on parts of other pieces.

- "The Yellow Princess": The Yellow Princess Overture by Camille Saint-Saëns
- "Lion": "A Rag Blues", "Yellow Woman Blues, and "Jailhouse Fire Blues" by Buddy Boy Hawkins and "Swing Low, Sweet Chariot"
- "The Singing Bridge of Memphis, Tennessee": "Quill Blues" by Big Boy Cleveland
- "Commemorative Transfiguration and Communion at Magruder Park": "Shortnin' Bread" and "All Creatures of Our God and King"

== Personnel ==
- John Fahey – guitar, sound effects
- Mark Andes – bass
- Matt Andes – guitars
- Jay Ferguson – organ, piano, keyboards
- Kevin Kelley – drums
- Barry Hansen – sound effects

Production notes:

- John Fahey – producer
- Barry Hansen – producer
- Sam Charters – executive producer
- Chuck McVicker – cover art
- Jules Halfant – cover design
- Jeff Lovelace – cover design
