= God, Time and Causality =

Album by John Fahey

Studio album by John Fahey
- Released: 1989
- Studio: Spectrum Sound, Portland, OR
- Genre: Folk
- Length: 56:45
- Label: Shanachie
- Producer: Terry Robb, John Fahey

John Fahey chronology
I Remember Blind Joe Death (1987)	God, Time and Causality (1989)	The John Fahey Christmas Album (1991)

God, Time and Causality is an album by American fingerstyle guitarist and composer John Fahey, released in 1989.

== History ==
With the exception of one track, the songs on this album were recorded and rejected by Takoma Records in 1977. Fahey sent these tracks to Shanachie Records after receiving an advance on the album.

The original album included a booklet and guitar tablature for "Requiem for Mississippi John Hurt" and "Steamboat 'Gwine Around the Bend".

== Reception ==
Professional ratings
Review scores
Source	Rating
AllMusic	4/5 stars
The Encyclopedia of Popular Music	3/5 stars
The Rolling Stone Album Guide	3.5/5 stars

AllMusic critic Steven McDonald wrote, "An excellent John Fahey outing, essentially examining his inspirations and drawing once again from them. It's beautifully recorded and mastered, and performed brilliantly. This one is highly recommended—would-be serious guitarists take note." CMJ New Music wrote that "[Fahey] has continually enriched his style to incorporate a deeper sense of his Delta blues roots, taking his compositions beyond the standard pop framework to create breathtakingly picturesque mood-scapes ranging from somber and dark to finger-pickin' ecstasy."

== Track listing ==
1. "Revelation" – 3:47
2. "The Red Pony" – 6:28
3. "Lion" – 6:38
4. "Medley: Interlude/The Portland Cement Factory/Requiem for Mississippi John Hurt" – 11:37
5. "Medley: Snowflakes/Steamboat 'Gwine Around the Bend/Death of the Clayton Peacock/How Green Was My Valley" – 11:46
6. "Medley: Sandy on Earth/I'll See You in My Dreams" – 16:29

== Personnel ==
- John Fahey – guitar

Production notes

- John Fahey– producer
- Terry Robb – producer
- Mike Moore – engineer
- Melody Fahey – photography
- Frederick Carlson – design
- Mark Humphrey – liner notes
