= Death Chants, Breakdowns & Military Waltzes =

1963 album by John Fahey

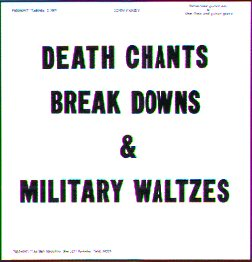
- Cover of the first edition

Studio album by John Fahey
- Released: 1963
- Recorded: 1962 in Adelphi, MD, and 1963 in Berkeley, CA
- Genre: American Primitivism
- Label: Takoma
- Producer: ED Denson

John Fahey chronology
Blind Joe Death (1959)	Death Chants, Breakdowns & Military Waltzes (1963)	The Dance of Death & Other Plantation Favorites (1964)

Alternative Cover
- Cover of the 1967 stereo edition of the LP

Death Chants, Breakdowns & Military Waltzes is a 1963 album by American fingerstyle guitarist and composer John Fahey. Various sources show either a 1963 or 1964 original release. It was Fahey's second release and the first to gain a national distributor.

== History ==
John Fahey's first album was self-released on Takoma Records although the label didn't formally exist until 1963. Fahey and ED Denson formed a partnership with record distributor Norman Pierce which led to increased sales and distribution for this and all Fahey's future releases.

Death Chants, Break Downs & Military Waltzes was recorded in both Adelphi, Maryland in 1962 and Berkeley, California in 1963, the same year as Fahey's and ED Denson's "rediscovery" of delta blues guitarist and singer Bukka White. Fahey had earlier left the East Coast to attend UC Berkeley and later the graduate program at UCLA in folklore. According to Byron Coley, "because a local 78 dealer was also a national distributor, [Death Chants] sold much more quickly than the first had, and it got favorable press in places like Peter Stampfel's influential column in Broadsides." Stampfel recalled that "Death Chants really blew my mind. [Fahey] used a traditional guitar style to play modern-based compositions in an extended way. And his liner notes were way cool." Because of the positive reception to the album, Fahey earned his first paying gig at Boston's Odyssey Coffeehouse in the summer of 1965.

In 1967 Fahey made new, stereo recordings of ten of the original albums's twelve tracks. The new performances were issued under the same title.

In his 1992 article "Reinventing the Steel" for Acoustic Guitar, Dale Miller described the liner notes that Fahey began including on his releases as "hilarious yet profound and somewhat disturbing phony folklorical ramblings that spoofed the pedantic notes on many folk releases of the day." Denson agreed with this assessment and stated "Fahey mythologized his life in the liner notes," and guitarist Leo Kottke referred to both the liner notes and music together as "a whole world that he sort of chips little pieces off of. It's intact, and you get glimpses of it through him." The liner notes to Death Chants are attributed to Chester C. Petranick (Petranick was a music teacher from Fahey's youth) and carry on the myth of Blind Joe Death:

"Blind Joe never sang. He had no voice. He had been struck blind and dumb at the age of three by a local member of the NAACP, for not complying with the organization's demand to learn bar chords and diminished augmented sevenths, so that he might disassociate himself from the myth of the Negro past. Here, thanks to the intensely personal stubborness [sic] of an old man who refused to bow to the dictates of crass commercialism and political interfuge, sat John Fahey at the feet of this old man, listening and waiting for his hands to be big enough to play the surrogate kithera as did his mentor. For in Blind Joe's music, the young white boy could discern a way in which he could express the intensely personal, bitter-sweet, biting, soul-stirring volk poetry of the harsh, elemental, but above all human life of the downtrodden Takoma Park people (volk)."

== Reception ==
Professional ratings
Review scores
Source	Rating
AllMusic	4/5 stars 3/5 stars
The Encyclopedia of Popular Music	('64) ('67)
The Great Folk Discography	7/10
Q	3/5 stars
The Rolling Stone Album Guide	4/5 stars
Spin Alternative Record Guide	9/10

In reviewing the 1967 reissue of Death Chants, Breakdowns & Military Waltzes for AllMusic, music critic Richie Unterberger writes that the material "is still outstanding" and compares it to the original release: "The fidelity is clearer." Of the 1999 reissue, Unterberger claims it "does Fahey fans a massive favor by combining both versions onto one disc... Fahey achieves a full and reverberant quality that sets it off not just from the average country blues revivalists of the period, but from vintage country blues itself ... it must be said that the originals have an intangibly more affecting, more mysterious quality that does not come through as strongly on the more carefully executed rehauls."

In his piece for The New York Times, Ben Ratliff called Death Chants, Breakdowns & Military Waltzes "dense with eccentricity."

== Reissues ==
- The original cover of Death Chants, Breakdowns & Military Waltzes was simply a white cover with black lettering of the title. Subsequent reissues included Vol. 2 in the title.
- In 1999, Takoma reissued both the original recordings and the later re-recordings on a single CD.

== Track listing ==
- All times are from the original 1964 release.
- All songs written or arranged by John Fahey.
1. "Sunflower River Blues" – 2:33
2. "When the Springtime Comes Again" – 3:50
3. "Stomping Tonight on the Pennsylvania/Alabama Border" – 6:58
4. "Some Summer Day" – 3:20
5. "On the Beach at Waikiki" – 2:55
6. "Spanish Dance" – 1:53
7. "The Downfall of the Adelphi Rolling Grist Mill" – 3:35
8. "John Henry Variations" – 5:40
9. "Take a Look at That Baby" – 1:25
10. "Dance of the Inhabitants of the Palace of King Phillip XIV" – 3:16
11. "America" – 7:52
12. "Episcopal Hymn" (based on "At the name of Jesus" by Ralph Vaughan Williams) – 1:10

Death Chants, Breakdowns & Military Waltzes

Compilation album by John Fahey
- Released: February 2, 1999
- Recorded: 1963, 1967
- Genre: Folk
- Length: 78:35
- Label: Takoma

== Reissue track listing (1999) ==
1. "Sunflower River Blues" – 2:33
2. "When the Springtime Comes Again" – 3:50
3. "Stomping Tonight on the Pennsylvania-Alabama Border" – 6:58
4. "Some Summer Day" – 3:20
5. "On the Beach at Waikiki" – 2:55
6. "Spanish Dance" – 1:53
7. "John Henry Variations" – 5:40
8. "The Downfall of the Adelphi Rolling Grist Mill" – 3:35
9. "Take a Look at That Baby" – 1:25
10. "Dance of the Inhabitants of the Palace of King Philip XIV" – 2:28
11. "America" – 7:52
12. "Episcopal Hymn" – 1:10
13. "Sunflower River Blues" – 3:19
14. "When the Springtime Comes Again" – 4:53
15. "Stomping Tonight on the Pennsylvania-Alabama Border" – 5:36
16. "Some Summer Day" – 3:25
17. "On the Beach at Waikiki" – 2:40
18. "Spanish Dance" – 2:05
19. "John Henry Variations" – 5:11
20. "Take a Look at That Baby" – 1:25
21. "America" – 5:00
22. "Episcopal Hymn" – 1:22

== Personnel ==
- John Fahey – guitar
- Nancy McLean – flute ("The Downfall of the Adelphi Rolling Grist Mill")
