= Old Girlfriends and Other Horrible Memories =

Studio album by John Fahey
- Released: 1992
- Recorded: 1988 ("Dianne Kelly") and 1990
- Studio: Spectrum Sound, Portland, Oregon
- Genre: Folk
- Length: 42:39
- Label: Varrick
- Producer: Terry Robb, John Fahey

John Fahey chronology
The John Fahey Christmas Album (1991)	Old Girlfriends and Other Horrible Memories (1992)	The Return of the Repressed: The John Fahey Anthology (1994)

Old Girlfriends and Other Horrible Memories is an album by American fingerstyle guitarist and composer John Fahey, released in 1992. It also marked the end of an era for Fahey, who would soon be involved in a downward spiral in his personal life, health and career.

== Reception ==
Professional ratings
Review scores
Source	Rating
AllMusic	3/5 stars
The Encyclopedia of Popular Music	3/5 stars

AllMusic critic Richard Meyer wrote, "All his trademark elements are here, eclectic song choices, dark and precise playing and a sense of fun." CMJ New Music wrote that "the mood on Old Girlfriends is one that finds comfort in a certain melancholia and longing spirit rather than dwelling on darker hues. That Fahey can evoke all these emotions with just an acoustic guitar proves the power possible behind simplicity, how one instrument can captivate with only feeling, and in this case memories, providing the motivation."

== Track listing ==
All songs by John Fahey unless otherwise noted.

1. "Twilight Time" (Buck Ram, Morty Nevins, Al Nevins) – 2:30
2. "The Sea of Love" (Phillip Baptiste, George Khoury) – 2:04
3. "In Darkest Night: The Objectification and Recurrent Sightings of Bizarre and Cathected Screen Memories (from below) Along the Sligo" – 4:00
4. "Blueberry Hill" (Vincent Rose, Larry Stock, Al Lewis) – 2:40
5. "A Rose and a Baby Ruth" (John D. Loudermilk) – 2:02
6. "Claire" – 3:13
7. "The Thing at the End of New Hampshire Avenue" – 3:29
8. "Don't" – 3:13
9. "View" – 4:13
10. "Dianne Kelly" – 7:40
11. "Fear & Loathing at 4th & Butternut" – 3:29
12. "Twilight on Prince Georges Avenue" (retitled version of "Marilyn" from Old Fashioned Love) – 4:06

== Personnel ==
- John Fahey – guitar
- Terry Robb – 1st guitar on "Twilight Time"
- Melody Fahey – ukulele on "A Rose and a Baby Ruth"

Production notes

- John Fahey– producer
- Terry Robb – producer
- Joan Bone – engineer
- Glenn Jones – assistant engineer
- Randy Kling – mastering
- Scott Billington – design
- Levoy Exil – cover art
