= The Return of the Repressed: The John Fahey Anthology =

Compilation album by John Fahey
- Released: 1994
- Genre: Folk
- Length: 121:42
- Label: Rhino
- Producer: Barry Hansen, James Austin

John Fahey chronology
Old Girlfriends and Other Horrible Memories (1992)	The Return of the Repressed: The John Fahey Anthology (1994)	City of Refuge (1997)

The Return of the Repressed: The John Fahey Anthology is a compilation album by American fingerstyle guitarist and composer John Fahey, released in 1994. Fahey's career, health and personal life had been in decline. The release of The Return of the Repressed, along with an article in Spin by Byron Coley, served to provide a renewal of his career.

== History ==
Most of Fahey's catalog was out-of-print at the time Barry Hansen began working on the Return of the Repressed compilation project for Rhino Records. He interviewed Fahey in Oregon and together with James Austin of Rhino, they selected the tracks to be included. At the time, Fahey was divorced from his second wife and was living in homeless shelters or cheap hotels. Hansen related in an interview with Jason Gross: "He came down with the Epstein-Barr syndrome, which was something that just kind of snuck up on him. Then the divorce. Those two things were linked, I think. The Epstein-Barr syndrome sapped his energy and [his wife] just got tired of him lying around the house, not doing anything. Then there was that sad story that he lost his house and didn't have any money." Dean Blackwood, later Fahey's partner in Revenant Records, relates that Fahey was never penniless, "He lived in a series of welfare-motels, weekly rentals, and all of them were more expensive than weekly rent on apartment. He always had this publishing income and that never went away."

Following a 1994 entry on Fahey in Spin magazine's spin-off Alternative Record Guide publication, Fahey learned that he now had a whole new audience, which included alternative US bands Sonic Youth and Cul de Sac, British comedian and writer Stewart Lee and the avant-garde musician Jim O'Rourke. Byron Coley published a large article called "The Persecutions and Resurrections of Blind Joe Death" (also in Spin magazine). New releases started to appear in rapid succession, in parallel to the reissue of all the early Takoma releases by Fantasy Records.

== Reception ==
Professional ratings
Review scores
Source	Rating
AllMusic	5/5 stars
Christgau's Record Guide	A−
The Encyclopedia of Popular Music	4/5 stars
MusicHound Folk	4/5
The Rolling Stone Album Guide	4.5/5 stars

Music critic Robert Christgau gave the album an A− rating, writing "...after two decades of asking myself why he's any better than Leo Kottke I've decided it's a spiritual thing—he's maintained a direct line to his inner amateur. For two whole CDs, definitely not boring. Just close enough to make you question the category." Rick Anderson, writing for AllMusic, recommended the box set with reservations, stating that "the faint-hearted should try to listen before buying."

Both the Baltimore City Paper and The New Rolling Stone Album Guide recommended The Return of the Repressed as an excellent place to start for listeners new to Fahey.

Eric Watford of CMJ New Music wrote "His unshowy style is quiet, unhurried and flowing, using unusual tunings for gorgeous open-string resonances, and focusing on melodies and harmonies which he occasionally augmented with a taste for Indian ragas and 20th century classical composers like Ives and Bartok."

== Track listing ==
All songs by John Fahey unless otherwise noted.

1. "Desperate Man Blues" (Traditional) – 4:01
2. "Dance of the Inhabitants of the Palace of King Phillip XIV of Spain" – 2:33
3. "Sligo River Blues" – 2:37
4. "Sun Gonna Shine in My Back Door Someday Blues" – 4:39
5. "On Doing an Evil Deed Blues" – 3:59
6. "I'm Gonna Do All I Can for My Lord" – 1:26
7. "Some Summer Day" – 3:28
8. "Worried Blues" (Fahey, Hutchison) – 2:30
9. "Tell Her to Come Back Home" (Fahey, Uncle Dave Macon) – 2:43
10. "Poor Boy" (Fahey, Bukka White) – 3:21
11. "Orinda-Moraga" – 3:57
12. "The Death of Clayton Peacock" – 2:57
13. "Brenda's Blues" – 1:49
14. "On the Sunny Side of the Ocean" – 3:15
15. "Revelation on the Banks of the Pawtuxent" – 2:37
16. "Night Train to Valhalla" – 2:19
17. "Knott's Berry Farm Molly" – 4:34
18. "Bill Cheatham" (Traditional) – 1:55
19. "Knoxville Blues" (Sam McGee) – 3:10
20. "Sunflower River Blues" – 6:03
21. "A Raga Called Pat (Pt. 1) " – 6:26
22. "In Christ There Is No East or West" (Harry Burleigh, John Oxenham) – 2:44
23. "The Yellow Princess" – 4:51
24. "Lion" – 5:10
25. "The Revolt of the Dyke Brigade" – 2:42
26. "The Portland Cement Factory at Monolith, California" – 4:27
27. "Steamboat Gwine 'Round de Bend" – 4:18
28. "Lord Have Mercy" (Traditional) – 2:32
29. "Beverly" – 4:51
30. "Hawaiian Two-Step" – 2:44
31. "Candy Man" (Reverend Gary Davis) – 1:28
32. "Jaya Shiva Shankara" (Traditional) – 5:03
33. "Medley: Silver Bell/Cheyenne" (Fahey, Doc Watson, Bill Monroe) – 4:31
34. "The Approaching of the Disco Void" – 6:33
35. "Summer Cat by My Door" – 4:17
36. "Theme and Variations" (Louis Hardin) – 3:00
37. "Lava on Waikiki" – 2:19
38. "Samba de Orfeu" (Luiz Bonfá) – 3:12
39. "Rain Forest" – 6:47
40. "Twilight Time" (Buck Ram, Morty Nevins, Al Nevins) –2:33
41. "The Sea of Love" (Phillip Baptiste, George Khoury) – 2:08
42. "Yes, Jesus Loves Me" (William Batchelder Bradbury, Anna B. Warner) – 1:45

== Personnel ==
- John Fahey – guitar
