= The Essential John Fahey =

Compilation album by John Fahey
- Released: 1974
- Recorded: 1967–1968
- Genre: Folk
- Length: 66:05 (CD reissue)
- Label: Vanguard
- Producer: Sam Charters, John Fahey

John Fahey chronology
Fare Forward Voyagers (Soldier's Choice) (1973)	The Essential John Fahey (1974)	Leo Kottke, Peter Lang & John Fahey (1974)

The Essential John Fahey is a compilation album by American fingerstyle guitarist and composer John Fahey, released in 1974.

== History ==
The original 1974 double-LP release included all songs from both Fahey's Vanguard albums—the only two albums Fahey recorded for the label. The CD reissue in 1993 of The Essential John Fahey contains all the tracks from The Yellow Princess and four from Requia, missing only the four-part "Requiem for Molly".

== Reception ==
Professional ratings
Review scores
Source	Rating
Allmusic	4.5/5 stars
Encyclopedia of Popular Music	3/5 stars
MusicHound Folk	4.5/5

In his Allmusic review, critic Mark Allan describes the album as "Essential John Fahey is not essential, but because it features this extraordinary musician solo and with a band — members of Spirit and Jo Jo Gunne — it could be a good place to start."

Writing for Dirty Linen magazine, Ivan Emke, in referring to the original albums wrote "Although they did not sell well at the time, they show Fahey well ahead of his time, and in good form. This is clearly experimental folk. Or the early use of sampling (from 1967, remember) during the four-part "Requiem for Molly." However, there was also the more standard fingerpicking, including the brilliant "Requiem for John Hurt." These CDs will help to remind us all of those paths that Fahey cleared.

In a review of the original LP release of The Essential John Fahey in the July 3, 1974 Milwaukee Journal, Pierre-Rene Noth praised the release but referred to "Requiem for Molly" as "[Fahey's] worst.. a horrid mix."

== Track listing ==
All songs by John Fahey.

=== Side one ===
1. "The Yellow Princess" – 4:49
2. "View (East from the Top of the Riggs Road/B&O Trestle)" – 4:54
3. "Lion" – 5:08
4. "March! For Martin Luther King" – 3:40
5. "The Singing Bridge of Memphis, Tennessee" – 2:49

=== Side two ===
1. "Dances of the Inhabitants of the Invisible City of Bladensburg" – 4:07
2. "Charles A. Lee: In Memoriam" – 3:58
3. "Irish Setter" – 7:14
4. "Commemorative Transfiguration and Communion at Magruder Park" – 5:59

=== Side three ===
1. "Requiem for John Hurt" – 5:05
2. "Requiem for Russell Blaine Cooper" – 8:51
3. "When the Catfish Is in Bloom" – 7:37

=== Side four ===
1. "Requiem for Molly, Part 1" – 7:35
2. "Requiem for Molly, Part 2" – 7:41
3. "Requiem for Molly, Part 3" – 2:28
4. "Requiem for Molly, Part 4" – 2:55
5. "Fight on Christians, Fight On" – 1:55

=== Reissue track listing (1993) ===
1. "The Yellow Princess" – 4:51
2. "View (East from the Top of the Riggs Road/B&O Trestle)" – 4:57
3. "Lion" – 5:10
4. "March! For Martin Luther King" – 3:43
5. "The Singing Bridge of Memphis, Tennessee" – 2:51
6. "Dances of the Inhabitants of the Invisible City of Bladensburg" – 4:10
7. "Charles A. Lee: In Memoriam" – 4:01
8. "Irish Setter" – 7:18
9. "Commemorative Transfiguration and Communion at Magruder Park" – 6:02
10. "Requiem for John Hurt" – 5:08
11. "Requiem for Russell Blaine Cooper" – 8:55
12. "When the Catfish Is in Bloom" – 7:41
13. "Fight on Christians, Fight On" – 1:55

== Personnel ==
- John Fahey – guitar
- Mark Andes – guitar, bass
- Matt Andes – guitars
- Jay Ferguson – organ, piano, keyboards
- Kevin Kelley – drums
- Special effects by John Fahey, Sam Charters and Barry Hansen
