= Of Rivers and Religion =

Studio album by John Fahey
- Released: August 15, 1972
- Recorded: 1972
- Genres: Folk, jazz
- Length: 37:40 (Original LP); 34:49 (Reissue)
- Label: Reprise
- Producers: John Fahey, Denny Bruce

John Fahey chronology
America (1971)	Of Rivers and Religion (1972)	After the Ball (1973)

Of Rivers and Religion is an album by American folk musician John Fahey, released in 1972. It was his first recording on a major label (Reprise Records) and is credited to John Fahey and His Orchestra. It marked a significant change from Fahey's previous releases, incorporating a backing band and performing songs and arrangements in a Dixieland jazz style. Although Time picked it as one of the Top Ten albums of 1972, it was also a difficult album to market and had little enthusiasm at Reprise.

== History ==
Of Rivers and Religion was the first album Fahey recorded with producer/manager Denny Bruce. Bruce had negotiated the contract with Reprise after failing to negotiate with Fahey's previous label, Vanguard Records.

Bruce arranged for the musicians, beginning with Jack Feierman who wrote the majority of the arrangements. Many of the New Orleans session players had previously contributed to Walt Disney's soundtrack for Song of the South. Some of the same musicians would appear on Fahey's second release for Reprise, After the Ball. Multi-instrumentalist and session musician Chris Darrow later commented, "I remember the first time I ever heard him, I thought they'd turned the record from 45 to 33 or something, 'cause I couldn't believe how slow he played." The session band appeared on "Dixie Pig Bar-B-Q Blues", "Texas and Pacific Blues" and "Lord Have Mercy".

Speaking of both Of Rivers and Religion and After the Ball in a 1998 interview for The Wire, Fahey recalled, "I don't understand why they got bad reviews. It's like every time I wanted to do something other than play guitar I got castigated."

The album cover featured a photo staged at Disneyland's Tom Sawyer's Island.

== Reception ==
Professional ratings
Review scores
Source	Rating
AllMusic	4/5 stars
Christgau's Record Guide	A
The Encyclopedia of Popular Music	4/5 stars
The Great Folk Discography	8/10
The Rolling Stone Album Guide	4/5 stars
Spin Alternative Record Guide	6/10

Time picked Of Rivers and Religion as one of the top ten albums of 1972. In his 1972 review for Rolling Stone, Bob Palmer praised the change in direction and said that Fahey "uses traditional motifs to construct pieces of dazzling contrasts, counter-balancing their deep feelings and dark undertows with a dry but devastating sense of humor ... it's Fahey's show most of the way and the guitarist makes the most of what is surely his finest hour."

In his AllMusic review, critic Brian Olewnick called it "a fine effort and certainly something that belongs on the shelves of any fan of the late, very great guitarist", while music critic Robert Christgau said that it is "not for everyone, but I think this is his best" and gave it an A rating; later, Christgau would rank it as the twenty-fifth best record of the decade.

== Reissues ==
- Of Rivers and Religion was reissued on CD in 2001 by Collectors' Choice.
- Of Rivers and Religion was also reissued along with After the Ball in 2003 by Warner Bros. Records.

== Track listing ==
Side one

1. "Steamboat Gwine 'Round de Bend" (Fahey) – 4:15
2. "Medley: Deep River/Ol' Man River" (Oscar Hammerstein II, Jerome Kern, Traditional) – 6:45
3. "Dixie Pig Bar-B-Q Blues" (Fahey) – 3:55
4. "Texas and Pacific Blues" (Traditional) – 4:30

Side two

1. "Funeral Song for Mississippi John Hurt" (Fahey) – 4:20
2. "Medley: By the Side of the Road/I Come, I Come" (Albert E. Brumley, Traditional) – 6:05
3. "Lord Have Mercy" (Traditional) – 2:28
4. "Song" (Fahey) – 5:22

== Personnel ==
- John Fahey – guitar
- Chris Darrow – guitar, dobro, fiddle, mandolin
- Joel Druckman – double bass
- Jack Feierman – trumpet
- Ira Nepus – trombone
- Joanne Grauer – piano, calliope
- Nappy La Mare – banjo
- Alan Reuse – banjo
- Joe Darensbourgh – clarinet

Production notes

- John Fahey – producer
- Denny Bruce – producer
- Jack Feierman – arranger
- Doug Decker – engineer
- Nat Hentoff – original liner notes
- Richie Unterberger – reissue liner notes
- Christopher Whorf – design
- Ed Thrasher – art direction and photography
- Scott Tepper – location concept (Disneyland, Tom Sawyer's Island at the Mississippi River ride)
