= Blind Joe Death =

1959 compilation album by John Fahey

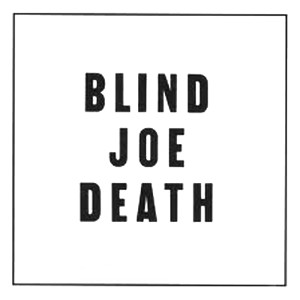

Studio album by John Fahey
- Released: 1959
- Recorded: 1959, St. Michael's and All Angels Church, Adelphi, Maryland
- Genre: American Primitivism
- Length: 43:21 (1959 version)
- Label: Takoma
- Producer: John Fahey

John Fahey chronology
Blind Joe Death (1959)	Death Chants, Breakdowns & Military Waltzes (1963)

Alternative cover
- Cover of the 1967 stereo release of the LP (design by Tom Weller)

Blind Joe Death is the first album by American fingerstyle guitarist and composer John Fahey. There are three different versions of the album, and the original self-released edition of fewer than 100 copies is extremely rare.

The recording of steel-string acoustic guitar solos was "incredibly avant-garde" in 1959. It was released on Takoma Records, Fahey's own label. It was not marketed and made no impression on the American record-buying public.

Its popularity, significance in guitar music, and critical reception have grown over the years. The music historian Richie Unterberger characterized Blind Joe Death as "a very interesting record from a historical perspective...as few if any other guitarists were attempting to interpret blues and folk idioms in such an idiosyncratic fashion in the late '50s and early '60s." Richard Cook of the NewStatesman wrote, "Only 100 copies were pressed. Incredibly, it was still enough of a milestone to secure him an almost worldwide reputation."

On April 6, 2011, the album was deemed by the Library of Congress to be "culturally, historically, or aesthetically important" and added to the United States National Recording Registry for the year 2010.

== Background ==
Initially released in 1959 in a very limited edition, one side of the record was credited to a mythical bluesman named Blind Joe Death, while the other side was credited to Fahey himself. It was one of the first albums recorded and produced by an independent artist. Self-released on Takoma Records, the label did not formally exist until 1963 when Fahey and ED Denson formed a partnership with record distributor Norman Pierce. Barry Hansen wrote in 1972, "John Fahey is the original underground musician. Dylan was still at Hibbing High School when John Fahey made his first record."

Fahey's earliest recordings were released on custom edition 78-rpm discs released by Fonotone, a record company run by his friend Joe Bussard. In 1959 Fahey made his own record, recorded in his hometown of Takoma Park, Maryland, and pressed by RCA Custom Recorders. He pressed only 100 copies using money he earned pumping gas at a local station and a loan of $300 from an Episcopal minister. Some of the copies were broken on their way from the plant and others given away to friends. Fahey sent copies to folklorists and scholars around the country. He also planted copies in record stores and Goodwill bins for lucky customers to come across. The remainder were slowly sold over a period of four years.

The material Fahey was playing and composing was unique in 1959. As influential musicologist and friend Dick Spottswood related, "He was not someone who was going with what we perceived as the mainstream at that time. Don't forget those were the days when rhythm and blues were all of a sudden being marketed to the white audiences called by a new name, rock 'n' roll, and John certainly wasn't interested in doing any of that...he wasn't doing any of those things that people made a living at on that instrument in those days."

The name for the mythical mentor came at a friend's suggestion. In an interview with Stefan Grossman in the 1980s, Fahey stated, "The reason it said "blind" is because a lot of the people I learned from were on old 78 RPM records and a lot of them were blind, and their names were Blind Willie Johnson, Blind Boy Fuller, Blind Joe Taggart, on and on, a whole bunch of them were blind. Also I was thinking, when ever you print the word 'Death' people look at it and I was thinking of record sales already even though I was only going to have a hundred copies pressed." Years later Fahey related, "The whole point was to use the word 'death'." Blind Joe Death was my death instinct. He was also all the Negroes in the slums who were suffering. He was the incarnation, not only of my death wish, but of all the aggressive instincts in me."

For years Fahey and Takoma continued to treat the imaginary guitarist Blind Joe Death as a real person, including booklets with their LPs containing biographical information about him including the "fact" that he had a guitar made from a baby's coffin and that he had taught Fahey to play. Fahey sometimes incorporated the myth of Blind Joe into his performances, wearing dark glasses and being led by the arm onto the stage.

== Reissues ==
There are three different versions of Blind Joe Death. After moving to Berkeley, California, where he attended college, Fahey's career as guitarist began to take off. Having recorded a somewhat successful second album, Death Chants, Breakdowns & Military Waltzes in late 1963, Fahey decided to re-release his original efforts. However, he decided to rerecord much of the material, as he felt he had become a much better player. This second pressing claims that "On Doing an Evil Deed Blues", "In Christ There Is No East or West", "The Transcendental Waterfall", and "Uncloudy Day" are 1964 rerecordings and the rest ("St. Louis Blues", "Poor Boy Long Ways from Home", "John Henry", "Desperate Man Blues", "Sun Gonna Shine in My Back Door Someday Blues", and "Sligo River Blues") are the original 1959 versions. "Uncloudy Day" was actually the same recording, as was "St. Louis Blues" in an edited version. The 1959 album contained a version of Blind Blake's "West Coast Blues", which (despite being rerecorded in 1964) was not included on the album. To fill the gap, the new version of "Transcendental Waterfall" was extended to over 10 minutes long, a glimpse of things to come.

By 1967 Fahey had released a number of albums and was very successful. It was decided that his first two albums be released in stereo; they were both rerecorded, resulting in a third version of Blind Joe Death, with a new, shorter version of "The Transcendental Waterfall" and a new song, "I'm Gonna Do All I Can for My Lord". The 1967 versions of Blind Joe Death and Death Chants, Breakdowns & Military Waltzes were actually recorded in mono and briefly released on mono LP. Later in 1967, these recordings were edited to create a stereo effect and released on stereo LPs with new artwork.

The 1959 album has only been re-issued on vinyl, under the original catalog number, Takoma K80P-4447/4448.

The 1996 Fantasy/Takoma CD reissue The Legend of Blind Joe Death compiles versions from all vinyl editions plus one unreleased track. According to liner notes, the first nine tracks were recorded in 1963, the subsequent ten were recorded in 1967, "The Transcendental Waterfall" was recorded in 1959 and the final track, "West Coast Blues", was recorded in 1964 but previously unreleased. However this seems ambiguous or erroneous. The 1959 record's version of "The Transcendental Waterfall" is 6:36, and the version here is 10:40, similar to the 1964 version. Many other tracks on the 1964 album were recorded in 1959, so it is unclear whether six of the first nine tracks on the CD are previously unreleased or the notes in this reissue are incorrect.

== Reception ==
Professional ratings
Review scores
Source	Rating
AllMusic	4/5 stars 4.5/5 stars
The Boston Phoenix	4/4 stars
The Encyclopedia of Popular Music	('59) ('67)
The Great Folk Discography	7/10
MusicHound Folk	4/5 stars
Q	3/5 stars
The Rolling Stone Record Guide	5/5 stars 3.5/5 stars
Spin Alternative Record Guide	7/10

The music critic Richie Unterberger wrote liner notes for reissues of two of Fahey's later albums. In his AllMusic review of the 1964 release of Blind Joe Death Unterberger wrote, "The album's mystique probably owes more to the 1959 record's rarity (and utter oddity in the context of its era) than the music, in which Fahey's experimental blues-folk acoustic fusion is just beginning to take shape. It remains a very interesting record from a historical perspective, however, as few if any other guitarists were attempting to interpret blues and folk idioms in such an idiosyncratic fashion in the late '50s and early '60s."

The 1967 version received five stars in both editions of The Rolling Stone Record Guide.

In its review of the 1997 reissue, Musician stated, "nobody had more emotional range or profound melodic gift than John Fahey.... Fahey's taste for the weirdly dissonant when dealing with foul emotions and his fascination with tone to the occasional exclusion of almost everything else is on fuller display here."

Q gave the reissue three stars, calling Fahey "a superlative acoustic guitar technician capable of blending elements of country, blues and ragtime into a style that in its spare, dark, haunting beauty was uniquely his own."

== Legacy ==
On April 6, 2011, the album was deemed by the Library of Congress to be "culturally, historically, or aesthetically important" and added to the United States National Recording Registry for the year 2010.

In a 2001 interview with VH1 discussing the influence and legacy of Fahey, Barry Hansen, a longtime friend and collaborator, said of Fahey's early career, "He basically started the whole idea of playing new music on traditional acoustic steel-string guitar. He was the original underground artist." The guitarist Leo Kottke said of Fahey, "John created living, generative culture. With his guitar and his spellbound witness, he synthesized all the strains in American music and found a new happiness for all of us. With John, we have a voice only he could have given us; without him, no one will sound the same."

== Track listing ==
=== 1959 version ===
Original 1959 track listing and composer credits as listed on the label:

Selections by Blind Joe Death
No.	Title	Writer(s)	Length
1.	"West Coast Blues"	Blind Blake	3:15
2.	"St. Louis Blues"	W. C. Handy	5:30
3.	"I'm a Poor Boy a Long Ways from Home"	Barbecue Bob	3:13
4.	"Uncloudy Day"	Josiah Kelley Allwood	3:23
5.	"John Henry"	Traditional	3:24
6.	"In Christ There Is No East or West"	Harry Burleigh; John Oxenham	2:37

Selections by John Fahey
No.	Title	Writer(s)	Length
1.	"The Transcendental Waterfall"		6:28
2.	"Desperate Man Blues"	Traditional	4:04
3.	"Sun Gonna Shine in My Back Door Some Day Blues"		3:32
4.	"Sligo River Blues"		3:03
5.	"On Doing an Evil Deed Blues"		4:34

=== 1964 version ===
Side one:

1. "St. Louis Blues" [edited version]
2. "I'm a Poor Boy a Long Ways From Home"
3. "Uncloudy Day"
4. "John Henry"
5. "In Christ There Is No East or West" [re-recorded]

Side two:

1. "The Transcendental Waterfall" [re-recorded]
2. "Desperate Man Blues" [re-recorded]
3. "Sun Gonna Shine in My Back Door Someday Blues"
4. "Sligo River Blues"
5. "On Doing an Evil Deed Blues" [re-recorded]

=== 1967 version ===
- All tracks re-recorded again, except for "The Transcendental Waterfall" which is an edited [6m.35s] version of the 1964 [10m.35s] re-recording.

Side one:

1. "On Doing an Evil Deed Blues"
2. "St. Louis Blues"
3. "Poor Boy Long Ways from Home"
4. "Uncloudy Day"
5. "John Henry"
6. "In Christ There Is No East or West"

Side two:

1. "The Transcendental Waterfall"
2. "Desperate Man Blues"
3. "Sun Gonna Shine in My Back Door Someday Blues "
4. "Sligo River Blues"
5. "I'm Gonna Do All I Can for My Lord"

The Legend of Blind Joe Death

Compilation album by John Fahey
- Released: 1996
- Recorded: 1964, 1967
- Genre: Folk
- Length: 75:30
- Label: Takoma

=== Reissue track listing (1996) ===
Original release dates for each track according to the liner notes are in parentheses. See Reissues section about possible errors.

1. "On Doing an Evil Deed Blues" (Fahey) (1964) – 5:07
2. "St. Louis Blues" (Handy) (1964) – 4:53
3. "Poor Boy, Long Ways from Home" (Fahey) (1964) – 3:12
4. "Uncloudy Day" (Josiah Kelley Alwood) (1964) – 3:23
5. "John Henry" (Traditional) (1964) – 3:20
6. "In Christ There Is No East or West" (Harry Burleigh, John Oxenham) (1964) – 2:21
7. "Desperate Man Blues" (Fahey) (1964) – 4:05
8. "Sun Gonna Shine in My Back Door Someday Blues" (Fahey) (1964) – 3:32
9. "Sligo River Blues" (Fahey) (1964) – 3:05
10. "On Doing an Evil Deed Blues" (Fahey) (1967) – 3:56
11. "St. Louis Blues" (Handy) (1967) – 3:15
12. "Poor Boy, Long Ways from Home" (Fahey) (1967) – 2:23
13. "Uncloudy Day" (Josiah Kelley Alwood) (1967) – 2:22
14. "John Henry" (Traditional) (1967) – 2:05
15. "In Christ There Is No East or West" (Burleigh, Oxenham) (1967) – 2:43
16. "Desperate Man Blues" (Fahey) (1967) – 3:58
17. "Sun Gonna Shine in My Back Door Someday Blues" (Fahey) (1967) – 4:39
18. "Sligo River Blues" (Fahey) (1967) – 2:33
19. "I'm Gonna Do All I Can for My Lord" (Fahey) (1967) – 1:24
20. "The Transcendental Waterfall" (Fahey) (1959?) – 10:36
21. "West Coast Blues" (Fahey) (recorded 1964, unreleased) – 1:25

== Personnel ==
- John Fahey – guitar
- Pat Sullivan – engineer (1959 version)

Production notes

- Bill Belmont – compilation producer
- ED Denson – producer, liner notes for 1967 reissue
- Glenn Jones – compilation liner notes
- Joe Tarantino – compilation remastering
- Tom Weller – art direction, cover art for 1964 and 1967 reissues
