= City of Refuge (John Fahey album) =

Studio album by John Fahey
- Released: February 11, 1997
- Recorded: 1996
- Genres: Folk, avant-garde
- Label: Tim/Kerr
- Producer: Scott Colburn

John Fahey chronology
| The Return of the Repressed: The John Fahey Anthology (1994) | City of Refuge (1997) | The Mill Pond (1997) |

City of Refuge is an album by American fingerstyle guitarist and composer John Fahey, released in 1997. It was his first original release in over five years and helped start his career resurgence.

== History ==
Most of Fahey's catalog had been out-of-print before renewed interest in him began with the release of the Return of the Repressed compilation project for Rhino Records and an article by Byron Coley called "The Persecutions and Resurrections of Blind Joe Death". At the time, Fahey was divorced from his second wife and was living in homeless shelters or cheap hotels.

City of Refuge was Fahey's first release in over five years and helped start his career resurgence, although it bears minimal resemblance to his earlier work. It incorporates sound collages overlaying guitar work with various sound effects, including portions of "Pause", from Stereolab's 1993 album Transient Random-Noise Bursts with Announcements. He followed its release that same year with a collaboration album with Cul de Sac, an EP, and another full-length CD.

Fahey states in the liner notes: "For many years I was listed in the Schwann Catalog under popular. That is a much more accurate category than folk or new age. But, the most accurate category is Alternative."

== Reception ==
Professional ratings
Review scores
| Source | Rating |
|---|---|
| AllMusic | 3/5 stars |
| Robert Christgau | C+ |
| The Encyclopedia of Popular Music | 3/5 stars |
| Entertainment Weekly | B |
| Rolling Stone | 3/5 stars |
| The Rolling Stone Album Guide | 2/5 stars |

City of Refuge received mixed reviews upon its release, most commenting on Fahey's unpredictability and innovation. Music critic Robert Christgau stated, "He doesn't want to be folk or New Age, and who can blame him?... Once in a while tunes poke through the refuse..." and referred to it as "...Fahey's ticket to wankdom."

Critic David Browne commented on Fahey's unpredictability and eccentricity and that "...Fahey's idiosyncratic style can lead to dark, glistening pieces like the title track—but also, alas, to indulgences like a 20-minute sound collage of static. Call it bizarro Windham Hill."

Rolling Stone said "...like a sleeper awakening, Fahey has ambled back into the room, still a bit unsteady from slumber." and AllMusic stated "Although guaranteed to irritate Fahey fans who only think of him as a "pretty" folk guitarist, City of Refuge is a mature and deep (if misanthropic) work, and one that deserves to be heard." CMJ New Music critic Douglas Wolk referred to the album as "...a bold, brash return to the acoustic guitar work of which he's been a master for almost 40 years, and a confident expansion of his talents."

PopMatters called the album "barely listenable", but probably the harshest review came from Gary Kamiya at Salon. "[It] may not be the most unpleasant album ever recorded, but it comes close. At several points during this interminable, self-indulgent aural experiment, I became convinced that Fahey's purpose was to recreate the exact sensation of a bad LSD trip or an evil hangover on a metaphysical scale. If that is true, he succeeded admirably: This album should come with a free packet of Thorazine. There are one or two tracks on City of Refuge where something like guitar playing can be heard... At its best, [it] achieves a nightmarish soundtrack quality... If you like nightmares, this album is for you."

In his article on Fahey's career resurgence in No Depression, Matt Hanks called City of Refuge "an album so good that in one fell swoop it erases many of the transgressions of former colleagues Kottke, Winston, and a host of other players who claim Fahey as a formative influence."

== Track listing ==
All songs by John Fahey.

1. "Fanfare" – 5:17
2. "The Mill Pond" – 3:50
3. "Chelsey Silver, Please Come Home" – 4:30
4. "City of Refuge I" – 20:28
5. "City of Refuge III" – 6:25
6. "Hope Slumbers Eternal" – 5:03
7. "On the Death and Disembowelment of the New Age" – 19:26

== Personnel ==
- John Fahey – guitar, sampling, tapes

Production notes

- John Pearse – string arrangements
- Mike Lastra – engineer
- Jeff Allman – engineer
- Scott Colburn – editing, mastering
- Marc Trunz – photography
