= Requia =

Studio album by John Fahey
- Released: November 1967
- Recorded: January 24–25, 1967
- Studio: Hollywood Sound Recorders, Hollywood, California
- Genre: American primitivism; musique concrète
- Length: 44:44
- Label: Vanguard
- Producer: Sam Charters

John Fahey chronology
Days Have Gone By (1967)	Requia (1967)	The Voice of the Turtle (1968)

Requia (subtitled and other compositions for guitar solo) is the eighth album by American fingerstyle guitarist and composer John Fahey. Released in November 1967, it was the first of Fahey's two releases on the Vanguard label. It originally received hostile reviews from music critics, particularly for its musique concrète experimentation. It has since been recognised as precursor to new-age music, and has been re-released multiple times, including by Terra in 1985, Vanguard in 1997 and 1998 and Ace in 1998.

== History ==
After six releases on his own label Takoma Records and one on Riverboat Records, Fahey signed a two-album contract with Vanguard Records, best known for its catalogue of recordings by a number of pivotal folk and blues artists from the 1960s. His manager at the time, Denny Bruce, recalled that "His deal was that he could record for Takoma 'experimental records,' but to try and make commercial recordings for Vanguard, with their approval of the budget."

After beginning with three solo guitar pieces, the four-part "Requiem for Molly" begins with solo guitar interspersed and accompanied by white noise, excerpts of both string and brass orchestras, Adolf Hitler speeches, choral music, scratchy 78-rpm recordings and various other tape loops and sound effects. The melody found in Part 3 is "California Dreaming", a recent Top 40 hit for the Mamas & the Papas. A short hymn-like song, "Fight On Christians, Fight On", based on "Christians, Fight On, Your Time Ain't Long" by Bo Weavil Jackson, played on bottleneck guitar concludes the recording.

Fahey stated "["Requiem for Molly, Pt. 1–4"] was my first attempt at musique concrète, but it's not very good and I don't really like that one. It was a good learning experience though."

"Requiem for John Hurt" refers to influential country blues singer and guitarist Mississippi John Hurt. Fahey recalled "He was in his quiet way, a very great man, and I deeply mourn our loss of him. So, I wrote this requiem for him, about him, but I play it the way Charley Patton would have played it, had he ever thought of such a thing, which of course he never would have."

In his original liner notes, Fahey wrote "Since 1948, after seeing the movie, The Thief of Bagdad, I composed cerebral symphonies every day. It was a pleasant pastime. But suddenly in 1953 I needed a full orchestra at my command—me playing every instrument in that impossible ensemble." He labeled the first two songs and "Requiem for Molly" as Requia and "When the Catfish Is in Bloom" and "Fight on Christians, Fight On" as Cantica.

== Reception ==
Professional ratings
Review scores
Source	Rating
AllMusic	3/5 stars
Daily News	3/5 stars
The Encyclopedia of Popular Music	3/5 stars
The Great Folk Discography	5/10
Reno Gazette-Journal	3/5 stars
Spin Alternative Record Guide	7/10

According to Edward Pouncey of The Wire, contemporary reception to Requia was mixed and often hostile, with many puzzled by the album's lengthy musique concrète centrepiece.

In his AllMusic review, critic Brian Olewnick describes the distinct differences in the two parts of Requia, calling the four solo pieces "a series of blues-based pieces in line with music he had previously recorded" and the second section ("Requiem for Molly") as sounding "a bit dated, largely because his source material... sounds heavy-handed and trite in retrospect." Olewnick summarizes the release writing "Requia doesn't rank up with the absolute best of his releases, but contains enough fine and interesting work to recommend it to Fahey fans."

In his book Beautiful Monsters, author Michael Long referred to Fahey as a pioneer and wrote "His personal aesthetic was easily translatable to the revisionist morbid aesthetic, most notably with respect to Requia, a collection containing the four-part "Requiem for Molly," Fahey's spatiotextural experiment in sampling, looping, and musique concrète." Kris Needs of Record Collector has similarly cited "Requiem for Molly" as a "deranged mosaic of effects" that predated sampling with its mixture of musical interpolations and "snatches of jazz and blues singers, Nazi marching songs, wedding music, hymns, brass bands and fairground organ, as well as self-recorded seals."

In a review of The Essential John Fahey in the July 3, 1974, Milwaukee Journal, Pierre-Rene Noth referred to "Requiem for Molly" as "[Fahey's] worst.. a horrid mix." In his piece for The New York Times, Ben Ratliff called Requia "dense with eccentricity." The album received new attention when re-released in 1985 by Terra Records, a pastoral folk jazz subsidiary label of Vanguard, as part of a series of releases exploring the roots of new-age music. Reviewing the reissue for the Reno Gazette-Journal, Paul Raeburn described Requia as a precursor to new-age, calling the mixture of folk and blues "as fresh and evocative" as the genre. However, he preferred the short tracks on side one to "Requiem for Molly", whose "ominous" sound effects he found distracting. A reviewer for Daily News said that the album would impress those who dismiss new-age music as "Muzak for the '80s", describing Fahey as "quirky and quiet" but engaging.

In 2017, Uncut ranked Requia at number 89 in their list of "The 101 Weirdest Albums of All Time"; contributor John Robinson wrote that Fahey's "singular oddness" derived in part from his humour, and commented that the album blends his distinctive meditative guitar soli with tape collage experimentation via "Requieum for Molly", in which Fahey's guitar is "mixed deep into a shifting music concrete soundworld of sucking reverb, white noise and – just in time for the summer of love – Adolf Hitler." In 2022, Uncut ranked the album at number 396 in their list of "The 500 Greatest Albums of the 1960s".

== Reissues ==
- Requia was reissued on CD in 1997 by Vanguard.
- All the songs, minus the four-part "Requiem for Molly" are included in the Vanguard CD reissue of The Essential John Fahey.
- Requia was reissued on CD in 1998 in the United Kingdom by Ace Records.
- All the songs, minus the parts 1 and 2 of "Requiem for Molly" are included in the Vanguard release The Best of the Vanguard Years.
- Requia was reissued on a vinyl LP in 2007 by Vanguard.

== Track listing ==
All songs by John Fahey.

1. "Requiem for John Hurt" – 5:10
2. "Requiem for Russell Blaine Cooper" – 8:56
3. "When the Catfish Is in Bloom" – 7:42
4. "Requiem for Molly, Pt. 1" – 7:40
5. "Requiem for Molly, Pt. 2" – 7:46
6. "Requiem for Molly, Pt. 3" – 2:33
7. "Requiem for Molly, Pt. 4" – 3:00
8. "Fight On Christians, Fight On" – 1:57

== Personnel ==
- John Fahey – guitar
- Special effects by John Fahey, Sam Charters and Barry Hansen
- Cover photo by Marvin Lyons

== See also ==
- Requiem
- Steve Tibbetts
