= The Epiphany of Glenn Jones =

Studio album by Cul de Sac & John Fahey
- Released: September 23, 1997
- Recorded: November 1996
- Studio: Normandy Studios, Warren, Rhode Island
- Genre: Folk, avant-garde, alternative rock, post-rock
- Length: 73:41
- Label: Thirsty Ear
- Producer: Jon Williams

Cul de Sac chronology
China Gate (1996)	The Epiphany of Glenn Jones (1997)	Crashes to Light, Minutes to Its Fall (1999)

John Fahey chronology
Womblife (1997)	The Epiphany of Glenn Jones (1997)	Georgia Stomps, Atlanta Struts and Other Contemporary Dance Favorites (1998)

The Epiphany of Glenn Jones is an album by American fingerstyle guitarist and composer John Fahey and the alternative rock/post-rock band Cul de Sac, released in 1997.

== History ==
“The Epiphany of Glenn Jones isn't the album I envisioned. Likely it is a more interesting album than any of us (save Fahey perhaps) had imagined: braver, more honest, more personal and more a reflection of who and where we were at the time we made it. By Fahey's criteria, that counts for a lot.

More importantly, the scales fell from my eyes about John Fahey. "Good!" said Fahey when I told him,"now maybe we can be better friends."

Excerpt from Glenn Jones' liner notes to The Epiphany of Glenn Jones (Thirsty Ear Records CD, 1997)

The project began with Geffen Records, and was to be a collaboration between Fahey and young musicians influenced by his earlier work. When this idea collapsed, Thirsty Ear Records producer Peter Gordon assembled the Cul de Sac/Fahey project. Cul de Sac had previously covered Fahey's song "The Portland Cement Factory at Monolith California" on their debut album Ecim.

Glenn Jones, the band's leader and guitarist, became interested and influenced by Fahey's early music while still in high school. He describes the band's project with Fahey in great detail in the original liner notes. The rehearsals and sessions were the source of friction between Fahey and the band. Jones later called the making of the album an "ordeal" and described the relationships between the two parties as "musical antagonism". Fahey later claimed to have erased all the early tapes of the music Cul de Sac brought to the sessions, a claim Jones refutes in subsequent interviews.

The final two tracks are spoken word recordings.

The sessions also mark the first appearance of The Great Koonaklaster, an Art Deco object Fahey acquired, named, and placed in the studio to bring focus to the sessions. It later appeared as the title of the Fahey tribute album The Great Koonaklaster Speaks: A John Fahey Celebration.

== Reception ==
Professional ratings
Review scores
Source	Rating
AllMusic	3/5 stars
The Boston Phoenix	3.5/4 stars
The Encyclopedia of Popular Music	3/5 stars

Music critic Tad Hendrickson stated "The Epiphany of Glenn Jones is a somber sound collage where Fahey's crisp acoustic playing and odd washes of sound are mated with atmospherics as varied as birds chirping and Cul De Sac's usual organ-drenched instrumental style."

In his review of Cul de Sac's release ECIM, music critic Michael Patrick Brady referred to The Epiphany of Glenn Jones as "a tremendous effort, stretching the quiet, minimalist Fahey beyond his typical comfort zone and into new and often unsettling realms, light-years apart from his solo explorations."

Critic Joe Garden referred to the disharmony of the collaborators while calling the final product "a work of brilliance, and a credit to both the artists who made it and the label with the guts to back such a decidedly risky venture." and wrote "The surprising thing about [it] is that it is the sound of artists giving up on planned material and succumbing to chance."

== Track listing ==
1. "Tuff" (Ace Cannon) – 5:05
2. "Gamelan Collage" (John Fahey) – 10:10
3. "The New Red Pony" (Fahey) – 5:51
4. "Maggie Campbell Blues" (Tommy Johnson, Public Domain) – 3:16
5. "Our Puppet Selves" (Cul De Sac, Glenn Jones) – 8:20
6. "Gamelan Guitar" (Fahey) – 5:27
7. "Come On in My Kitchen" (Robert Johnson) – 4:06
8. "Magic Mountain" (Fahey) – 9:00
9. "More Nothing" (Fahey, Jones) – 6:37
10. "Nothing" (Fahey) – 15:49

== Personnel ==
- John Fahey – acoustic guitar, electric lap steel guitars, tapes
- Glenn Jones – guitar
- Chris Fujiwara – bass
- Jon Proudman – drums
- Robin Amos – electronics
- Jon Williams – tapes

Production notes:

- Jon Williams – producer, engineer
