= I Am the Resurrection (album) =

I Am the Resurrection: A Tribute to John Fahey

Compilation album by Various artists
- Released: February 14, 2006
- Genre: Alternative
- Label: Vanguard

Tributes to John Fahey chronology
A Tribute to John Fahey (1979)	I Am the Resurrection: A Tribute to John Fahey (2006)	Friends of Fahey Tribute (2006)

I Am the Resurrection: A Tribute to John Fahey is a tribute album to American guitarist John Fahey, released in 2006. The album's title is taken from the title of the third track of his album The Transfiguration of Blind Joe Death.

== History ==
Co-produced by Stephen Brower and M. Ward, I Am the Resurrection was the first John Fahey tribute album released after his death. Brower related, "We wanted to go after people who we thought wouldn't do traditional renderings of his stuff."

== Reception ==
Professional ratings
Review scores
Source	Rating
Allmusic	3/5 stars
Blender	5/5 stars
The Music Box	3/5 stars
Pitchfork Media	(6.9 of 10)
PopMatters	(6 of 10)
Stylus	C−

I Am the Resurrection received mixed reviews upon its release, although most were favorable or equivocal. In his Allmusic review, critic Alex Henderson noted the "interesting thing about this Fahey tribute compilation is the fact that it isn't dominated by fingerpickers and Fahey disciples." and "this compilation wasn't assembled with purists in mind." He called the disc a bit uneven but it "is full of pleasant surprises and is a memorable demonstration of the fact that Fahey's compositions can be useful well beyond the fingerpicker field."

Erik Davis of Blender gave the tribute album five of five stars and stated "For once, the motley character of most tribute records fits the subject." John Metzger of The Music Box felt "there's nothing on I Am the Resurrection that is anywhere near as groundbreaking or strange as Fahey's own recordings. Yet, what the performers accomplish is still strikingly potent." Steve Horowitz praised the album, writing it is "hard to resist pushing the replay button and listening to [each song] again before going on to the next song. That's true of every tune on this disc, which is a fine tribute to one of America's most remarkable artists."

In his review for Pitchfork Media, Matthew Murphy praised some artist's appearances while noting less success for others. Murphy called Sufjan Stevens contribution "typically fussy" and an "ill match for the contours" of Fahey's music and M. Ward's rendition "falls completely flat." Equally mixed was Andrew Gerig's review for Stylus magazine that "the tribute disc is only for Fahey diehards" and that too many of the artists "hold back."

In his review of The Great Koonaklaster Speaks: A John Fahey Celebration, Grayson Currin called I Am the Resurrection "the first... and the biggest failure" of the Fahey tribute albums... to think that I Am the Resurrection's alternately self-involved (Stevens) or irreverently unimaginative (Peter Case) interpretations gave newcomers invalid impressions of Fahey's catalogue is, really, a bit frightening."

== Track listing ==
All songs by John Fahey unless otherwise noted.

No.	Title	Writer(s)	Performer	Length
1.	"Death of the Clayton Peacock"		The Fruit Bats	3:01
2.	"Sunflower River Blues"		Pelt	3:18
3.	"Variation on 'Commemorative Transfiguration and Communion at Magruder Park'"		Sufjan Stevens	4:18
4.	"Sligo River Blues"		Devendra Banhart	3:11
5.	"Dance of Death"		Calexico	6:36
6.	"The Singin Bridge of Memphis, Tennessee (Brooklyn Bridge Version: The Coel)""		Lee Ranaldo	2:50
7.	"Bean Vine Blues, No. 2"		M. Ward	1:45
8.	"The Portland Cement Factory at Monolith, CA"		Cul de Sac	4:34
9.	"Dance of the Inhabitants of the Palace of King Phillip XIV of Spain"		Jason Lytle	2:41
10.	"Joe Kirby Blues"		Immerglück, Kaphan, Krummenacher & Hanes	5:03
11.	"Medley: John Hurt Shiva Shankarah"		Currituck Co.	7:31
12.	"When the Catfish is in Bloom"		Peter Case	7:30
13.	"My Grandfather's Clock"	Traditional	Howe Gelb	2:03

== Personnel ==
- Joey Burns – vocals, guitar, upright bass
- Sufjan Stevens – vocals, acoustic guitar, electric guitar, banjo, flute, recorder, oboe, drums, shaker, triangle, percussion
- Kevin Barker – vocals, electric guitar, recorder, percussion
- David Immerglück – guitar
- Jack Rose – guitar
- Lee Ranaldo – guitar
- M. Ward – guitar
- Glenn Jones – guitar
- Bruce Kaphan – lap steel guitar
- Mike Gangloff – banjo
- John Convertino – marimba, drums
- Otto Hauser – drums, percussion
- Michael Knobloch – drums
- John Hanes – drums
- Robin Amos – electronics
- Rosie Thomas – background vocals

Production

- Jim Waters – mixing
- Kevin Nettleingham – mastering
- Stephen Brower – liner notes
- Glenn Jones – liner notes
- Kevin Barker – liner notes
- Zak Riles – photography
