= ECIM =

Studio album by Cul de Sac
- Released: 1991
- Studio: Fort Apache, Dorchester, Massachusetts
- Genre: Post-rock
- Length: 49:17
- Label: Capella
- Producer: Cul de Sac

Cul de Sac chronology
ECIM (1991)	I Don't Want to Go to Bed (1995)

Professional ratings
Review scores
Source	Rating
AllMusic	4.5/5 stars
PopMatters	8/10

ECIM is the debut album of Cul de Sac, released in 1991 through Capella.

== Track listing ==
No.	Title	Writer(s)	Length
1.	"Death Kit Train"	Glenn Jones	6:51
2.	"The Moon Scolds the Morning Star"	Glenn Jones	4:42
3.	"Stranger at Coney Island"	Glenn Jones	1:54
4.	"Homunculus"	Robin Amos, Chris Fujiwara, Chris Guttmacher, Glenn Jones	7:52
5.	"Portland Cement Factory at Monolith, California"	John Fahey	4:11
6.	"Nico's Dream"	Glenn Jones	5:45
7.	"The Invisible Worm"	Robin Amos, Glenn Jones	4:15
8.	"Song to the Siren"	Tim Buckley	3:37
9.	"Electar"	Glenn Jones	4:57
10.	"Lauren's Blues"	Glenn Jones	5:13

2006 remastered CD
No.	Title	Writer(s)	Length
11.	"Cul de Sac"	Robin Amos, Chris Fujiwara, Chris Guttmacher, Glenn Jones	3:00
12.	"The Bee Who Would Not Work"	Robin Amos, Chris Fujiwara, Chris Guttmacher, Glenn Jones	3:35
13.	"Negligee"	Robin Amos, Chris Fujiwara, Chris Guttmacher, Glenn Jones	0:38

== Personnel ==
Cul de Sac

- Robin Amos – synthesizers, sampler
- Chris Fujiwara – bass guitar
- Chris Guttmacher – drums, percussion
- Glenn Jones – guitar, contraption

Production and additional personnel

- Cul de Sac – production, mixing
- Ruthie Dornfeld – fiddle on "The Moon Scolds the Morning Star" and "Lauren's Blues"
- Dredd Foole – vocals on "Homunculus" and "Song to the Siren"
- David Greenburger – design
- Daved Hild – cover art
- Phil Milstein – percussion on "Stranger at Coney Island"; tapes on "Nico's Dream" and "The Invisible Worm"
- Sean Slade – recording
- Jon Williams – mixing
- Ed Yazijian – steel guitar on "Electar"
