= The Best of John Fahey 1959–1977 =

Greatest hits album by John Fahey
- Released: 1977
- Recorded: 1967–1977
- Genres: Folk, American Primitivism, New Acoustic
- Length: 78:44 (Reissue)
- Label: Takoma
- Producers: ED Denson, John Fahey, Henry Kaiser (Reissue)

John Fahey chronology
Christmas with John Fahey Vol. II (1975)	The Best of John Fahey 1959–1977 (1977)	John Fahey Visits Washington D.C. (1979)

The Best of John Fahey 1959–1977 is a compilation album by American fingerstyle guitarist and composer John Fahey, released in 1977. The songs are collected from four of Fahey's dozen or so releases up to that point.

== History ==
The original album consisted of tracks picked out by Fahey for the release, with two tracks "Spanish Two-Step" (called "Hawaiian Two-Step" on After the Ball) and "Dance of the Inhabitants of the Palace of King Philip XIV of Spain" re-recorded for the album.

The Best of John Fahey music folio.

For the original release, Guitar Player Magazine published a matching music folio of tablature for guitar. It also contained essays by Fahey, continuation of the tale of Blind Joe Death, and an ongoing story which meandered across the pages and the page margins throughout the book. In the introduction Fahey wrote:

"While technique is important, it is only part of the story. Music is a language—a language of emotions. The worst possible way to play these songs—and I am not only talking about my own compositions—is in metronome time at a uniform volume. Another terrible thing would be to play any composition the same way every time, or to feel that you have to play it exactly the way someone else, such as myself, played it or said to play it. A good technician must also be creative. Even if a person is not a composer, he can interpret and arrange, and these skills are as important as technique in making a performance interesting. I rely heavily on both technique and interpretation, and I think of myself as a very good composer, arranger, and plagiarest for the solo acoustic guitar"

The book is no longer in print.

== Reception ==
Professional ratings
Review scores
Source	Rating
Allmusic	4.5/5 stars
Encyclopedia of Popular Music	4/5 stars
The Rolling Stone Record Guide	5/5 stars 4/5 stars
Tom Hull	A−

The original album received five stars in both editions of the Rolling Stone Record Guide.

Music critic Richie Unterberger called attention to Rhino's two-CD The Return of the Repressed: The John Fahey Anthology as "...a wider-spanning, lengthier chronological overview that's preferable for those wanting a fuller appreciation of [Fahey's] work." Unterberger also noted that "...what's here is good, important acoustic guitar music combining folk, blues, Americana, and unclassifiably weird originality, although it gives short shrift to some of his odder, more experimental 1960s and 1970s work."

== Reissues ==
The Best of John Fahey was reissued on CD in 2002 by Takoma and included three bonus tracks taken from three later albums. It includes liner notes and commentary by such guitarists as Leo Kottke, Peter Lang, Jim O'Rourke, and George Winston, some of whom had recorded numerous Fahey compositions on their own albums or who were once signed to his Takoma label.

== Track listing ==
All songs by John Fahey unless otherwise noted.

1. "Sunflower River Blues" – 3:21
2. "St. Louis Blues" (W. C. Handy) – 3:18
3. "Poor Boy Long Ways from Home" – 2:27
4. "When the Springtime Comes Again" (Fahey, Pat Sullivan) – 4:55
5. "Some Summer Day" – 3:27
6. "Spanish Dance" – 2:07
7. "Take a Look at That Baby" – 1:27
8. "I'm Going to Do All I Can for My Lord" – 1:27
9. "The Last Steam Engine Train" – 2:19
10. "In Christ There Is No East or West" – 2:46
11. "Give Me Cornbread When I'm Hungry" – 3:12
12. "Dance of the Inhabitants of the Palace of King Philip XIV of Spain" – 3:19
13. "Revolt of the Dyke Brigade" – 3:03
14. "On the Sunny Side of the Ocean" – 3:54
15. "Spanish Two-Step" – 2:21
  2002 reissue bonus tracks:
16. "America" – 7:43
17. "Fare Forward Voyagers" – 23:39
18. "Desperate Man Blues" – 3:59

== Personnel ==
- John Fahey – guitar

Production notes

- ED Denson – producer
- John Fahey – producer
- Henry Kaiser – reissue producer, liner notes
- Bob de Sousa – engineer
- Dallas Jordan – engineer
- John Judnich – engineer
- Joe Tarantino – remastering
- Stephen J. Cahill – cover photo
- Linda Kalin – design
- Jamie Putnam – art direction
- Leo Kottke – commentary
- Peter Lang – commentary
- Michael Gulezian – commentary
- Jim O'Rourke – commentary
- Terry Robb – commentary
- George Winston – commentary
