= Crashes to Light, Minutes to Its Fall =

Studio album by Cul de Sac
- Released: May 4, 1999
- Recorded: May 1998–December 1998 at Sound Station Seven, Providence, Rhode Island
- Genre: Post-rock
- Length: 72:54
- Label: Thirsty Ear
- Producer: Jon Williams

Cul de Sac chronology
The Epiphany of Glenn Jones (1997)	Crashes to Light, Minutes to Its Fall (1999)	Immortality Lessons (2002)

Professional ratings
Review scores
Source	Rating
AllMusic	4/5 stars
Alternative Press	4/5 stars
Pitchfork	7.5/10

Crashes to Light, Minutes to Its Fall is the fourth album by Cul de Sac, released in 1999 through Thirsty Ear Recordings.

== Reception ==
Seth Mnookin from CMJ New Music Report wrote that "Cul De Sac is exciting, adventurous and vital, as it proves once again on the excellent Crashes To Light. Once again, Glenn Jones is a constant marvel, one minute threading his pointillist lead lines through a series of melodic shifts and the next searing the listener with an eruption of squalls reminiscent of Ennio Morricone's spaghetti Westerns [...] Crashes To Light also features the rest of Cul De Sac in rare form".

Mark Richardson from Pitchfork wrote "What makes Crashes stand out among the boring noodlers that have sprung from the indie rock woodwork? It's the fact that the sounds they make conjure such clear pictures—the sound of the cinema [...] Of course, it wouldn't be an instrumental rock album without a couple of flat-out snoozers, and the record has exactly two—not exactly a bad ratio in this genre [...] This is music that grows on you, a keeper."

== Track listing ==
All tracks are written by Glenn Jones, except "Sands of Iwo Jima" and "Auf der Maur" by Cul de Sac.

No.	Title	Length
1.	"Etaoin Shrdlu"	8:55
2.	"K"	6:20
3.	"A Voice Through a Cloud"	9:23
4.	"Into the Cone of Cold"	3:46
5.	"Far Off, the Fabulous Iron Serpent Whistles"	6:04
6.	"Father Silence"	9:25
7.	"Hagstrom"	9:17
8.	"Sands of Iwo Jima"	12:24
9.	"Auf der Maur"	0:53
10.	"On the Roof of the World"	6:27

== Personnel ==
Cul de Sac

- Robin Amos – synthesizers, sampler, autoharp
- Michael Bloom – bass guitar
- Glenn Jones – guitar, bouzouki
- Jon Proudman – drums

Production and additional personnel

- Colin Decker – mastering
- Jon Williams – production, recording
