= Christmas with John Fahey Vol. II =

Christmas with John Fahey, Vol. II

Studio album by John Fahey
- Released: 1975
- Recorded: 1975
- Studio: United/Western Recording, Hollywood, CA
- Genre: Folk, Christmas
- Length: 33:28
- Label: Takoma
- Producer: John Fahey, Doug Decker

John Fahey chronology
Old Fashioned Love (1975)	Christmas with John Fahey, Vol. II (1975)	The Best of John Fahey 1959–1977 (1977)

Christmas with John Fahey, Vol. II is a Christmas album by American fingerstyle guitarist and composer John Fahey, released in 1975.

== History ==
This is John Fahey's second volume of Christmas music. His first, 1968's The New Possibility, has been one of Fahey's best selling recordings, selling over 100,000 copies.

Takoma artist Rick Ruskin duets with Fahey on a few of the numbers. "Christmas Fantasy" parts 1 and 2 take up the complete side two.

John Fahey's Guitar Christmas Book, a folio of guitar transcriptions of songs from The New Possibility and Christmas with John Fahey Vol. II, was published in 1981. It is no longer in print.

A 2000 CD reissue of The New Possibility includes the entire contents of both that album and Christmas with John Fahey Vol. II, except for "Christmas Fantasy - Part One".

== Reception ==
Professional ratings
Review scores
Source	Rating
AllMusic	4/5 stars
The Encyclopedia of Popular Music	2/5 stars
The Rolling Stone Album Guide	3/5 stars

In his AllMusic review, Jon Pruett wrote that the side-long "Christmas Fantasy" "gives plenty of reason to search out this record. Here, he dips into his characteristic, methodical plucking that flows from uneven to dizzying before lapsing into more melodic segments. Crashing and discordant at one moment, gentle and flowing the next. It's not your typical Christmas fantasy and probably provided some nightmarish, surreal qualities to anyone hoping to inject some typical musical yuletide cheer into their holiday."

== Track listing ==
1. "O Holy Night" (Adolphe Adam, John Sullivan Dwight) – 3:26
2. "Christmas Medley: O Tannenbaum/Angels We Have Heard on High/Jingle Bells" (Ernst Anschütz, James Pierpont) – 3:28
3. "Russian Christmas Overture" (Traditional) – 6:45
4. "White Christmas" (Irving Berlin) – 4:55
5. "Carol of the Bells" (Traditional) – 2:34
6. "Christmas Fantasy, Part One" (Traditional) – 11:44
7. "Christmas Fantasy, Part Two" (Traditional) – 12:20

== Personnel ==
- John Fahey – guitar
- Richard Ruskin – guitar (on "O Holy Night", "Medley", "Russian Christmas Overture", and "Carol of the Bells")

Production notes

- John Fahey – producer
- Doug Decker – producer, engineer
- Stephanie Pyren – cover art
