= Tuff (instrumental) =

Single by Ace Cannon

from the album Tuff-Sax
- B-side: "Sittin' Tight"
- Released: October 1961
- Genre: Blues rock
- Length: 2:01
- Label: Hi
- Songwriter: Ace Cannon
- Producer: Carl McVoy

Ace Cannon singles chronology
"Big Shot" (1960)	"Tuff" (1961)	"Blues (Stay Away from Me)" (1962)

"Tuff" is a song written and performed by Ace Cannon, and was arranged and produced by Carl McVoy. It was featured on his 1962 album Tuff-Sax.

== Chart performance ==
It reached No,3 on the U.S. R&B chart and No.17 on the U.S. pop chart in 1962. The song ranked No.40 on Billboard magazine's Top 100 singles of 1962.

== Other versions ==
- Billy Vaughn and His Orchestra - on their 1962 album Chapel by the Sea.
- Fausto Papetti - on his 1965 album 3a Raccolta.
- Boots Randolph - on his 1965 album Plays 12 Monstrous Sax Hits!
- Ray Anthony - on his 1968 album Ray Anthony Now.
- Charlie Musselwhite - on his 1979 album The Harmonica According to Charlie Musselwhite.
- Hank Crawford and Jimmy McGriff - on their 1990 album On the Blue Side.
- Clifford Scott - on his 1992 album Mr. Honky Tonk Is Back in Town.
- John Fahey and Cul de Sac - on their 1997 album The Epiphany of Glenn Jones.
