= China Gate =

China Gate may refer to:

- China Gate (1957 film), a Hollywood film directed by Samuel Fuller and starring Gene Barry and Angie Dickinson
- China Gate (1998 film), an Indian Hindi-language film by Rajkumar Santoshi, starring Urmila Matondkar, Om Puri, Amrish Puri and Naseeruddin Shah
- China Gate (album), a 1996 album by Cul de Sac
- China Gate (novel), a 1983 novel by William Arnold
- China Gate (website), a Chinese online website
- China Gates, a 1977 piano piece by John Adams

== See also ==
- 1996 United States campaign finance controversy, known as "Chinagate"
- Cox Report (1999), regarding Chinese espionage of United States nuclear weapons
- Gate of China (disambiguation)
