= Abhayamudra (album) =

Live album by Cul de Sac and Damo Suzuki
- Released: November 2, 2004
- Recorded: May 2, 2002–April 8, 2003 in the U.S. and Europe
- Genre: Post-rock
- Length: 129:16
- Label: Strange Attractors Audio House
- Producers: Cul de Sac, Damo Suzuki

Cul de Sac chronology
The Strangler's Wife (2003)	Abhayamudra (2004)

Professional ratings
Review scores
Source	Rating
AllMusic	3.5/5 stars
Pitchfork	(6.3/10)

Abhayamudra is a double live collaboration album by the American musical group Cul de Sac and Japanese vocalist Damo Suzuki, released on November 2, 2004 through Strange Attractors Audio House.

== Track listing ==
All tracks are written by Cul de Sac and Damo Suzuki.

Disc one
No.	Title	Length
1.	"Beograd 1"	14:58
2.	"Halle 2"	20:36
3.	"Baltimore 5"	13:34
4.	"Berlin 4"	8:59
5.	"Frankfurt 4"	12:59

Disc two
No.	Title	Length
1.	"Beograd 6"	8:10
2.	"Cambridge 1"	8:06
3.	"Berlin 6"	3:54
4.	"Kopenhagen 3"	9:10
5.	"Berlin 3"	10:36
6.	"Zagreb 3"	18:14

== Personnel ==
Musicians

- Robin Amos – Eml 101 synthesizer, harmonica, autoharp
- Glenn Jones – guitar, bouzouki
- Jonathan LaMaster – bass guitar, violin
- Jon Proudman – drums
- Damo Suzuki – vocals, production

Production and additional personnel

- Matthew Azevedo – mastering
- Lars Christensen – engineering
- Cul de Sac – production
- Jim Siegel – drums on "Kopenhagen 3"
- Jake Trussell – bass guitar on "Cambridge 1"
