= America (John Fahey album) =

Studio album by John Fahey
- Released: 1971
- Recorded: 1971
- Studio: Larrabee Sound, Los Angeles
- Genre: American primitivism
- Length: 38:51 (Original version); 79:16 (Reissued version)
- Label: Takoma
- Producer: John Fahey

John Fahey chronology
The New Possibility (1968)	America (1971)	Of Rivers and Religion (1972)

America is an album by American folk musician John Fahey, released in 1971. Originally intended to be a double album, it was released as a single LP. The unreleased material was subsequently restored in later CD and vinyl reissues.

== History ==
The America sessions yielded over 80 minutes of music and Fahey worried that a double album wouldn’t sell. Originally planned to be a double-LP, almost half of the material was cut when it was released as a single LP. The 1998 CD reissue by Takoma restores the unreleased tracks. The title song, "America", is an extended version of the song originally recorded on Death Chants, Breakdowns & Military Waltzes and was cut from the original release. It is a rare example of Fahey playing a 12-string guitar. Fahey commented on the original and reissue releases in an interview for The Wire, "I thought the material on the second disc wasn't quite up to snuff, but listening to it now, it doesn't sound too bad."

The front and back cover art was created by Patrick Finnerty, the painting titles were respectively "The Turtle in the Millpond" and "The Destruction of Takoma Park, Maryland, 20012 [sic]". The original working title for the album was "Ecology".

In 1972, referring to "Mark 1:15", Fahey said "“Out of all the songs I ever wrote, I consider only two of them 'epic' or 'classic' or in the 'great' category and they are both on this record. It’s taken me more than five years to complete these." The CD reissue edits out roughly two minutes from this track due to the time constraints of a single CD pressing. "Mark 1:15" includes portions of "When the Springtime Comes Again," from Death Chants, Breakdowns & Military Waltzes.

"Dvorak" is an arrangement of the third movement of Antonín Dvořák's Symphony No. 8. "Jesus is a Dying-Bed Maker" is based on the traditional gospel music song "In My Time of Dying. "Dalhart, Texas, 1967" was later revisited as "The Grand Finale" on John Fahey Visits Washington D.C..

America was reissued on a limited edition vinyl double album in 2009 on the San Francisco–based label 4 Men With Beards. It includes all tracks and a gatefold with a reproduction of the original album booklet. In reproducing the 1998 CD version, this release also included the truncated "Mark 1:15"

== Reception ==
Professional ratings
Review scores
Source	Rating
AllMusic	4/5 stars
The Encyclopedia of Popular Music	3/5 stars
Entertainment Weekly	A
The Great Folk Discography	5/10
MusicHound Folk	5/5 stars
The Rolling Stone Album Guide	3.5/5 stars
Spin Alternative Record Guide	8/10

In his review of the reissue of America, music critic Richie Unterberger called it "Fahey at his most ambitious ... inventive acoustic guitar instrumentals that draw from folk and blues, with a sedate presentation that has a relaxing effect" and contrasts the CD reissue with the original LP. Will Hermes of Entertainment Weekly likewise contrasts favorably the two releases, stating, "Restored to full scope, this set of chamber blues projects a sweeping panorama, combining epic originals with fractal readings of Skip James, Dvorak, and even "Amazing Grace". A new cornerstone in a towering oeuvre."

Matt Hanks of No Depression treats the reissue just as kindly, calling the reissue of America the "biggest debunker to date" of the improvement of the songs by reissue. "Heard in near-entirety, America transcends its already classic standing and becomes one of the most ambitious and epic records Fahey ever made ... if you’re seeking one man’s ruminations on a world that has both enchanted and forsaken him, America is the Fahey effect you’re looking for."

Critic Greg Cahill of the Sonoma County Independent called the reissue "rapturous in its beauty—a majestic, spacious work as grand in its deceptive simplicity as the early American landscape from which it draws inspiration."

== Track listing ==
All songs by John Fahey unless otherwise noted.

1. "Voice of the Turtle" – 15:42
2. "The Waltz That Carried Us Away and Then a Mosquito Came and Ate Up My Sweetheart" – 5:49
3. "Mark 1:15" – 16:18
4. "Knoxville Blues" (Sam McGee) – 3:07

=== 1998 reissue ===
1. "Jesus Is a Dying Bedmaker" – 4:20
2. "Amazing Grace" (John Newton) – 2:18
3. "Song #3" – 1:48
4. "Special Rider Blues" (Skip James) – 3:03
5. "Dvorák" (Antonín Dvořák, arranged by Fahey) – 3:42
6. "Jesus Is a Dying Bedmaker 2" – 3:23
7. "Finale" – 3:10
8. "America" – 7:40
9. "Dalhart, Texas, 1967" – 11:01
10. "Knoxville Blues" (Sam McGee) – 3:07
11. "Mark 1:15" – 14:18
  - Note: Song has been abridged
12. "Voice of the Turtle" – 15:42
13. "The Waltz That Carried Us Away and Then a Mosquito Came and Ate Up My Sweetheart" – 5:49
- Note some CD reissues incorrectly use "Jesus Is a Dying Bedmaker" instead of the correct "Jesus Is a Dying-Bed Maker".

== Personnel ==
- John Fahey – guitar

Production notes

- John Fahey – producer
- Bill Belmont – reissue producer
- Patrick Finnerty – art direction, design
- John Judnich – engineer
- Joe Tarantino – remastering
- Charles M. Young – liner notes
