= Immortality Lessons =

2002 live album by Cul de Sac

Live album by Cul de Sac
- Released: May 7, 2002
- Recorded: May 27, 1999 at Brandeis University, Waltham, Massachusetts
- Genre: Post-rock
- Length: 53:12
- Label: Strange Attractors Audio House
- Producer: Ofer Inbar

Cul de Sac chronology
Crashes to Light, Minutes to Its Fall (1999)	Immortality Lessons (2002)	Death of the Sun (2003)

Professional ratings
Review scores
Source	Rating
AllMusic	3/5 stars
Alternative Press	3.5/5 stars
Pitchfork	7.2/10

Immortality Lessons is a live album by Cul de Sac, released in 2002 through Strange Attractors Audio House.

== Track listing ==
No.	Title	Writer(s)	Length
1.	"Etaoin Without Shrdlu"	Glenn Jones	6:17
2.	"Enhoft Down"	Jon Proudman	2:16
3.	"Immortality Lessons"	Glenn Jones	4:59
4.	"Tartarugas"	Michael Bloom	3:28
5.	"Frozen in Fury on the Roof of the World"	Glenn Jones	6:42
6.	"The Dragonfly's Bright Eye"	Glenn Jones	10:32
7.	"Liturgy"	Robin Amos	3:11
8.	"Flying Music from Faust"	Glenn Jones	4:48
9.	"Blues in E"	Glenn Jones	10:59

== Personnel ==
Cul de Sac

- Robin Amos – synthesizers, sampler, autoharp
- Michael Bloom – bass guitar
- Ofer Inbar – production
- Glenn Jones – guitar, bouzouki
- Jon Proudman – drums
