= Dharma Blues =

Studio album by Peter Lang
- Released: February 19, 2002
- Genre: Blues, folk
- Length: 50:17
- Label: Horus
- Producer: Peter Lang

Peter Lang chronology
| American Stock (1986) | Dharma Blues (2002) | Guitar (2003) |

Dharma Blues is the title of a recording by American folk and blues guitarist Peter Lang, released in 2002.

== History ==
Dharma Blues was Lang's first release since his 1986 American Stock. Lang's first solo album, The Thing at the Nursery Room Window was released in 1972 on Takoma Records. Along with Lang, John Fahey launched the careers of other notable artists on Takoma, including Leo Kottke. Lang had toured and recorded for nearly ten years before leaving the business.

In his liner notes for Dharma Blues, Lang states "I had distanced myself from the music business for many years, but never the music. Dogs howl, people play music. When the moon is full, I howl."

== Reception ==
Professional ratings
Review scores
| Source | Rating |
|---|---|
| Allmusic | 3/5 stars |

Allmusic reviewer Ronnie D. Lankford, Jr. states in his review that Dharma Blues "pretty much picks up where Lang and his fellow pickers left off in the 1970s. Unlike Fahey or, say, Robbie Basho, however, Lang's fingerpicking seldom uses dissonance or shows the influence of Eastern music... Most of the pieces on Dharma Blues are self-penned and have enough bite to keep them from falling into new age sameness."

== Track listing ==
All songs by Peter Lang except "Poor Boy" by John Fahey and Bukka White and "Guitar Rag" by Sylvester Weaver.

1. "Thicker Than Wicker" - 3:28
2. "Walter's Wings" - 2:12
3. "Variations on Lampe" - 2:05
4. "Lost on Chainbridge Road" - 2:42
5. "Poor Boy/Guitar Rag" - 2:22
6. "Halloween Blues" - 3:17
7. "Big Mo's Habenero" - 2:02
8. "Spanish Fandango" - 3:05
9. "Dogs Howl" - 9:32
10. "Evangeline's Moon" - 3:18
11. "Itasca" - 5:13
12. "Dharma Blues" - 11:01

== Personnel ==
- Peter Lang – guitar

Production notes:

- Produced by Peter Lang
- Engineered by Peter Lang and Michael McKern
- Mixed and mastered by Michael McKern
- Associate producers: James Hauck, Thom Waters, Michael McKern
