= The Strangler's Wife =

Soundtrack album by Cul de Sac
- Released: October 21, 2003
- Recorded: Jon Williams' Vortex Studios, East Albany, Vermont
- Genre: Post-rock
- Length: 41:47
- Label: Strange Attractors Audio House
- Producer: Cul de Sac

Cul de Sac chronology
Death of the Sun (2003)	The Strangler's Wife (2003)	Abhayamudra (2004)

Professional ratings
Review scores
Source	Rating
AllMusic	3/5 stars
Pitchfork	(6.8/10)

The Strangler's Wife is a soundtrack album by Cul de Sac, released on October 21, 2003 through Strange Attractors Audio House.

== Track listing ==
All tracks are written by Cul de Sac.

No.	Title	Length
1.	"First Victim (Apple)"	3:25
2.	"Second Victim?"	1:35
3.	"That's Great Then, Isn't It?"	1:47
4.	"Second Victim (Shower)"	2:30
5.	"Lovemaking/Mae's Theme"	2:32
6.	"Flashbacks"	2:13
7.	"Mirror I ("We're the Same Person")"	0:56
8.	"Pregnancy Test I ("Will You Take Care of Us, Mr. Bear?")"	0:17
9.	"Pregnancy Test II"	0:50
10.	"Tailing the Strangler"	2:18
11.	"Mirror II (Mae and Elena)"	5:17
12.	"Frustrated Seduction ("Wash It Off!")"	1:35
13.	"Fifth Victim (Aerobics)"	1:11
14.	"Mae Learns the Truth"	4:38
15.	"The Dumpster"	2:07
16.	""You Don't Do Bad Things!""	1:21
17.	"Seventh Victim (Fire Extinguisher)"	2:23
18.	"Denouement/End Credits"	4:52

== Personnel ==
Cul de Sac

- Robin Amos – Eml 101 synthesizer, keyboards
- Glenn Jones – electric guitar, acoustic guitar
- Jonathan LaMaster – violin, bass guitar, bağlama, harp
- Jon Proudman – drums
- Jake Trussell – turntables, sampler, melodica, bağlama, drums

Production and additional personnel

- Cul de Sac – production
- Colin Decker – mastering
- Jon Williams – guitar, recording
