= Death of the Sun =

Studio album by Cul de Sac
- Released: February 18, 2003
- Recorded: Jon Williams' Vortex Studios, East Albany, Vermont
- Genre: Post-rock, Avant-garde
- Length: 42:25
- Label: Strange Attractors Audio House
- Producer: Robin Amos, Glenn Jones, Jake Trussell

Cul de Sac chronology
Immortality Lessons (2002)	Death of the Sun (2003)	The Strangler's Wife (2003)

Professional ratings
Review scores
Source	Rating
AllMusic	4/5 stars
Pitchfork	(7.9/10)

Death of the Sun is the fifth album by Cul de Sac, released on February 18, 2003 through Strange Attractors Audio House.

== Track listing ==
No.	Title	Writer(s)	Length
1.	"Dust of Butterflies"	Robin Amos, Glenn Jones, Jonathan LaMaster, Jon Proudman, Jake Trussell	9:54
2.	"Bamboo Rockets, Half Lost in Nothingness, Searching for an Inch of Sky"	Glenn Jones, Jon Proudman	4:30
3.	"Turok, Son of Stone"	Robin Amos, Jon Proudman	7:26
4.	"Bellevue Bridge"	Glenn Jones	6:13
5.	"Death of the Sun"	Robin Amos, Glenn Jones, Jonathan LaMaster, Jon Proudman, Jake Trussell	8:47
6.	"I Remember Nothing More"	traditional, Glenn Jones	5:35

== Personnel ==
- Robin Amos – synthesizers, sampler, production, engineering
- Colin Decker – mastering
- Glenn Jones – acoustic guitar, bass guitar, electric sitar, production, engineering
- Jonathan LaMaster – double bass, natural horn, violin
- Jon Proudman – drums
- Jake Trussell – melodica, toy piano, sampler, production, engineering, photography
