= I Don't Want to Go to Bed (album) =

Studio album by Cul de Sac
- Released: 1995
- Recorded: 1990–1993
- Genre: Post-rock
- Length: 75:53
- Label: Thirsty Ear
- Producer: Robin Amos, Bill Salkin

Cul de Sac chronology
ECIM (1991)	I Don't Want to Go to Bed (1995)	China Gate (1996)

Professional ratings
Review scores
Source	Rating
AllMusic	4/5 stars

I Don't Want to Go to Bed is the second album by American instrumental rock band Cul de Sac, released in 1995 through Thirsty Ear Recordings.

== Critical reception ==
The Rough Guide to Rock described the tracks as "raw, lengthy rehearsal pieces that recall Can's studio jams in intensity and invention."

== Track listing ==
All tracks are written by Cul de Sac, except "Doldrums" and "This Is the Metal That Do Not Burn" by Glenn Jones.

No.	Title	Length
1.	"Abandoned Hospital"	10:44
2.	"Doldrums"	9:26
3.	"Graveyard for Robots"	11:32
4.	"The Fraud of Satisfaction"	4:03
5.	"Roses in the Wallpaper"	5:49
6.	"This Is the Metal That Do Not Burn"	11:02
7.	"Lower Hate, Massachusetts"	2:16
8.	"The Kim Parker Report"	3:38
9.	"Count Donut"	5:09
10.	"For Seasickness"	5:39
11.	"Lully's Gangrene"	6:58

== Personnel ==
Cul de Sac

- Robin Amos – synthesizers, kalimba, production
- Chris Fujiwara – bass guitar
- Chris Guttmacher – drums, percussion, guitar
- Glenn Jones – guitar, keyboards

Production and additional personnel

- David Greenburger – design
- Bill Salkin – production, engineering
