= Prime Cuts =

Prime Cuts may refer to:

- Prime Cuts (Jordan Rudess album), a compilation album by Jordan Rudess
- Prime Cuts, a compilation album by Steve Morse
- Prime Cuts (Suicidal Tendencies album), a compilation album by Suicidal Tendencies
- Prime Cuts (Shadow Gallery album), a compilation album by Shadow Gallery
- Prime Cuts (Peter Lang album), a 1977 album by Peter Lang
- Prime Cuts (Tempest album), a 2008 compilation album by Tempest
