= The Wanting =

The Wanting may refer to:

- The Wanting (Glenn Jones album)
- The Wanting (Cody Jinks album)
