= Old Fashioned Love =

Old Fashioned Love may refer to:

- "Old Fashioned Love" (1923), standard song by James P. Johnson and Cecil Mack recorded by many artists
- "Old Fashioned Love", 1939 song by Frank Loesser and Fritz Miller
- Old Fashioned Love, 1975 album by John Fahey
- "Old Fashioned Love" (The Kendalls song), 1975 by The Kendalls
- Old Fashioned Love" (Gary Goetzman, Mike Piccirillo), single from Smokey Robinson's 1982 album Yes It's You Lady
