= Live in Tasmania =

Live album by John Fahey
- Released: 1981
- Recorded: October 15, 1980, Hobart, Tasmania
- Genre: Folk
- Label: Takoma
- Producer: Peter Noble

John Fahey chronology
| Yes! Jesus Loves Me (1980) | Live in Tasmania (1981) | Railroad (1983) |

Live in Tasmania is a live album by American fingerstyle guitarist and composer John Fahey, released in 1981. It was his first live album release after 18 albums.

== History ==
After 18 studio albums, Fahey released this live album from a concert in Tasmania, set up, according to the original liner notes, on a drunken whim. It was recorded on four days' notice at the University of Tasmania in 1980 when Fahey was touring Australia.

Four songs are re-titled from previously recorded versions. "Tiger" is "Lion", "Tasmanian Two-Step" is "Hawaiian Two-Step"/"Spanish Two-Step" and "Return of the Tasmanian Tiger" is "Revolt of the Dyke Brigade". "Indian-Pacific R.R. Blues" is actually "Beverly", a studio recording from After the Ball. "The Approaching of the Disco Void" is a re-working of "Wine and Roses".

It was in 1981 that Fahey and his second wife Melody left Los Angeles after he had lived there nearly 20 years and moved to Salem, Oregon.

== Reception ==
Professional ratings
Review scores
| Source | Rating |
|---|---|
| AllMusic | 4/5 stars |
| The Encyclopedia of Popular Music | 3/5 stars |
| Rolling Stone | 4/5 stars |
| The Rolling Stone Album Guide | 3.5/5 stars |

In his AllMusic review, critic Richard Foss called it "a marvelous gift to an audience that had probably never heard of him five days before, and it is fortunate indeed that this concert was not merely recorded, but captured brilliantly so that not a note was lost."

In his 1981 review for Rolling Stone, Charles M. Young praised the album and said it "is pretty accessible, as Fahey records go. Uninitiated listeners ought to be able to appreciate his strong stroke and profound sense of rhythm quite easily. A legendary character in concert, Fahey was apparently in one of his unpredictable good moods so far from home. Let me follow suit and chide my own audience for not buying enough of his albums."

== Reissues ==
- Live in Tasmania was reissued on CD in 2004 on both Takoma Records and in the United Kingdom on Ace Records.

== Track listing ==
All songs by John Fahey unless otherwise noted.

1. "Introduction/On the Sunny Side of the Ocean/Tasmanian Two-Step/Tiger" – 13:34
2. "The Approaching of the Disco Void" – 6:48
3. "Waltzing Matilda" (Fahey, Traditional) – 2:27
4. "Fahey Establishes Rapport With the Tasmanians: A Dissertation on "Obscurity"/The Return of the Tasmanian Tiger/Funeral Song for Mississippi John Hurt" – 8:53
5. "Steamboat Gwine 'Round de Bend" – 4:54
6. "Indian-Pacific R.R. Blues" – 4:57

== Personnel ==
- John Fahey – guitar

Production notes

- Peter Noble – producer, liner notes
- John Van Hamersveld – cover illustration
- Tom Davis – mixing
- Jim O'Rourke – reissue liner notes
