= China Gate (album) =

Studio album by Cul de Sac
- Released: May 21, 1996
- Recorded: August 1995 at Rainfarm Studios, North Reading, Massachusetts
- Genres: Post-rock, space rock
- Length: 64:28
- Label: Flying Nun/Thirsty Ear
- Producers: Cul de Sac, Jon Williams

Cul de Sac chronology
I Don't Want to Go to Bed (1995)	China Gate (1996)	The Epiphany of Glenn Jones (1997)

Professional ratings
Review scores
Source	Rating
AllMusic	4/5 stars
Alternative Press	5/5 stars

China Gate is an album by Cul de Sac, released in 1996. The album incorporated elements of surf rock.

== Critical reception ==
Trouser Press wrote that "[Jon] Proudman is an extremely musical drummer who can hold down the fort while taking off on flights of fancy with the liquidly propulsive [Chris] Fujiwara." Rolling Stone praised "the deft, pointillist strokes with which guitarist Glenn Jones dots the margins of his spare compositions."

Paste listed the album as one of the "50 Best Post-Rock Albums", writing that it "set the bar for the group's expansive experimentalism, allowing them to work Can-like rhythms, Eastern-influenced melodies, flickering electronics, and plenty of noise into their deconstructions of the rock idiom."

== Track listing ==
No.	Title	Writer(s)	Length
1.	"China Gate"	Harold Adamson, Victor Young	1:11
2.	"Sakhalin"	Glenn Jones	5:49
3.	"Nepenthe"	Glenn Jones	8:47
4.	"Doldrums"	Glenn Jones	5:45
5.	"James Coburn"	Robin Amos, Chris Fujiwara, Glenn Jones, Jon Proudman	6:30
6.	"Virgin Among Cannibals"	Robin Amos, Chris Fujiwara, Glenn Jones, Jon Proudman	2:09
7.	"...His Teeth Got Lost in the Mattress..."	Glenn Jones	3:06
8.	"Hemispheric Events Command"	Glenn Jones	6:15
9.	"The Fourth Eye"	Glenn Jones	11:36
10.	"The Colomber"	Glenn Jones	6:16
11.	"China Gate" (reprise)	Harold Adamson, Victor Young	0:31
12.	"Utopia Pkwy."	Glenn Jones	6:51

== Personnel ==
Cul de Sac

- Robin Amos – synthesizers, sampler, vocals
- Chris Fujiwara – bass guitar
- Glenn Jones – guitar
- Jon Proudman – drums, vocals

Production and additional personnel

- Cul de Sac – production
- Nancy Given – design
- Bill Salkin – engineering
- Walter Stickle – engineering
- Jon Williams – production, engineering
