= Days Have Gone By =

Studio album by John Fahey
- Released: July 1967
- Studio: Sierra Sound Laboratories, Berkeley, CA and Los Angeles
- Genre: American primitivism
- Length: 52:35
- Label: Takoma
- Producer: John Fahey

John Fahey chronology
The Great San Bernardino Birthday Party & Other Excursions (1966)	Days Have Gone By (1967)	Requia (1967)

Days Have Gone By is an album by American fingerstyle guitarist and composer John Fahey, released in 1967. The cover labels the album Volume 6 while it was preceded in 1966 by The Great San Bernardino Birthday Party which is labeled Guitar Vol. 4.

== History ==
Days Have Gone By continues Fahey's interest in soundscapes, sound effects and experimental music—begun on The Great San Bernardino Birthday Party & Other Excursions—mixed in with the more traditional guitar playing of his earlier musical style. This is especially present on the two-part piece, "A Raga Called Pat".

"The Portland Cement Factory at Monolith, California," was covered by Cul de Sac on their album ECIM.

== Reception ==
Professional ratings
Review scores
Source	Rating
AllMusic	4/5 stars
The Encyclopedia of Popular Music	3/5 stars
The Great Folk Discography	7/10
The Rolling Stone Album Guide	3.5/5 stars
Spin Alternative Record Guide	8/10

Music critic Ronnie D. Lankford, Jr. of AllMusic praised the album, noting that it "expands American blues traditions by enriching the palette of the guitar with Eastern tunings. He may create a challenging work like 'A Raga Called Pat--Part Two' that is difficult to interpret, but its opulence is undeniable. Fahey has often been grouped with new age music but this—especially with his early work—is somewhat of a misnomer. New age strives to build harmony; Fahey revels in conflict. Days Have Gone By is another rewarding reissue of the master's classic '60s work and will be eagerly greeted by guitar aficionados."

From his review for All About Jazz, critic Derek Taylor called it "... an album very much in the experimental vein that he first started tapping in the early 1960s... Fahey's influence remains indelibly etched in the psyches of those who have followed him, regardless of whether or not the corporate music culture chooses to recognize it. The self-styled grandfather of “American Primitive” guitar may be gone, but with documents like this one within ready reach his memory and music will endure for years and years to come."

In late 2007, The Guardian included the album on their list of "1000 albums to hear before you die", writing: "Fahey makes innovative use of splicing and sampling. Locomotive sounds blend with his acoustic guitar to create a sparse, meditative atmosphere. A wide-open, pan-American travelogue."

== Reissues ==
- Days Have Gone By was reissued on CD in 2001 by Takoma Records.

== Track listing ==
All songs credited to John Fahey unless otherwise noted.

1. "The Revolt of the Dyke Brigade" – 2:40
2. "Impressions of Susan" – 5:08
3. "Joe Kirby Blues" – 3:12
4. "Night Train of Valhalla" – 2:17
5. "The Portland Cement Factory at Monolith, California" – 4:26
6. "A Raga Called Pat, Pt. 1" – 6:25
7. "A Raga Called Pat, Pt. 2" – 8:13
8. "My Shepherd Will Supply My Needs" – 8:52
9. "My Grandfather's Clock" (Henry Clay Work, Traditional) – 1:31
10. "Days Have Gone By" – 2:54
11. "We Would Be Building" (Jean Sibelius) – 1:57

== Personnel ==
- John Fahey – guitar
- Robert Gardner – guitar (on "My Grandfather's Clock")
