= Live at Charlotte's Web =

Live album by Peter Lang
- Released: October 25, 2007
- Recorded: Charlotte's Web, Rockford, Illinois
- Genre: Blues, folk
- Label: Horus
- Producer: Peter Lang

Peter Lang chronology
Guitar (2003)	Live at Charlotte's Web (2007)	Testament (2008)

Live at Charlotte's Web is a live album by American folk and blues guitarist Peter Lang, recorded between 1977 and 1980.

This 2-CD, 1-DVD package was recorded live at the club, Charlotte's Web, in Rockford, Illinois.

== Track listing ==
All songs by Peter Lang unless otherwise noted.

1. "Daylight Is Darkkness" – 2:53
2. "Drifting Away" – 3:08
3. "Farewell Maximillian" – 2:40
4. "Fatback & Greens" – 2:01
5. "Future Shot at the Rainbow" – 5:07
6. "Going Down the China Road" (Lang, Traditional) – 3:51
7. "Green Apple Quickstep" – 2:02
8. "Two Steps Forward, One Step Back" – 4:15
9. "When Kings Come Home" – 4:12
10. "That Will Never Happen No More/Angel of Baffin's Bay" – 3:09
11. "Wide Oval Rip-Off" – 2:57
12. "My Dear Mary Anne" – 3:28
13. "Young Man, Young Man, Look at Your Shoes" – 2:55
14. "Halloween Blues/That's All Right Medley" (Lang, Dave Ray) – 5:47
15. "Adair's Song" – 1:37
16. "Back to the Wall" – 2:23
17. "Colored Aristocracy" (Traditional) – 1:50
18. "Country Blues Medley" (Traditional) – 3:06
19. "Guitar Rag" (Sylvester Weaver, Traditional) – 2:06
20. "I Should Have Known" – 2:36
21. "Jimmy Bell" (Cat Iron, Lang) – 3:00
22. "Living in the Weeds" – 2:54
23. "Quetico Reel/Poor Howard" (Lang, Lead Belly) – 3:02
24. "R. C. Rag" – 2:51
25. "Red Meat on the Road" – 4:34
26. "Round Worm Reel/Snow Toad" – 3:15
27. "St. Charles Shuffle" – 2:50
28. "There Will Be a Happy Meeting In Heaven Tonight" (Adger M. Pace) – 2:10
29. "Toth's Song" – 6:01
30. "Turnpike Terror" – 2:29

== Personnel ==
- Peter Lang – guitar, vocals
