= Back to the Wall =

Studio album by Peter Lang
- Released: 1978
- Recorded: Minneapolis, MN
- Genre: Blues, folk
- Label: Waterhouse Records
- Producer: James Hauck

Peter Lang chronology
Prime Cuts (1977)	Back to the Wall (1978)	American Stock (1986)

Back to the Wall is a recording by American folk and blues guitarist Peter Lang, released in 1978. It is out of print.

== Track listing ==
=== Side one ===
1. "Going Down the China Road" (Peter Lang, Public Domain) – 3:28
2. "Back to the Wall" (Lang) – 2:10
3. "Guitar Rag " (Sylvester Weaver, Traditional) – 1:52
4. "Country Blues Medley" (Traditional) – 2:00
5. "Jimmy Bell" (Cat Iron, Lang) – 2:45
6. "Colored Aristocracy" (Traditional) – 1:45

=== Side two ===
1. "My Dear Mary Anne" (Lang) – 3:10
2. "Halloween Blues" (Lang) – 3:45
3. "Living in the Weeds" (Lang) – 2:00
4. "Windy and Warm" (John D. Loudermilk) – 1:40
5. "This World Is Not My Home" (Traditional) – 2:12
6. "Farewell Maximillian" (Lang) – 2:45

== Personnel ==
- Peter Lang – vocals, guitar
- Jeff Dayton – pedal steel guitar
- Brad Grapp – drums
- James Hauck – marimba
- Prudence Johnson – vocals
- Tom Lieberman – vocals
- Tim Sparks – vocals
- Gary Lopac – bass
- Jim Price – violin
- Ted Unseth – saxophone
- John Bennett – trombone
- Mark Brunner – trumpet

== Production ==
- Produced by James Hauck
- Engineered by Michael McKern
