= Yes! Jesus Loves Me =

Studio album by John Fahey
- Released: 1980
- Studios: Gingerbread, Santa Monica, California
- Genre: Folk
- Label: Takoma
- Producer: John Fahey

John Fahey chronology
John Fahey Visits Washington D.C. (1979)	Yes! Jesus Loves Me (1980)	Live in Tasmania (1981)

Yes! Jesus Loves Me (subtitled Guitar Hymns) is an album by American fingerstyle guitarist and composer John Fahey, released in 1980. It was Fahey's poorest selling release.

== Reception ==
Professional ratings
Review scores
Source	Rating
AllMusic	3.5/5 stars
The Encyclopedia of Popular Music	3/5 stars
Record Collector	4/5 stars
Spin Alternative Record Guide	6/10

AllMusic's Mark Allan praised the album, noting that "Fahey weaves a spell with his precise picking and odd tunings... if you unplug the phone, turn off the TV and give it the chance, this music might briefly remove you from your everyday existence."

From his review for the UK-based Record Collector, critic Jason Draper gave the album 4 stars, stating that "it’s a concise, stately piece of work, Fahey tapping into blues, classical and even bordering on ragtime guitar... it transcends time and spans agee... grand and full enough to fill the deepest chamber and the grandest dining room, yet intimate enough for a fireside sherry when the kids have gone to bed. If you can’t be touched by this, you can’t be touched by anything."

== Reissues ==
- Yes! Jesus Loves Me was released combined with Gospel Nights by Maria Muldaur.
- Yes! Jesus Loves Me was reissued on CD in 2007 by Ace Records.

== Track listing ==
1. "Yes, Jesus Loves Me" (Anna B. Warner) – 1:46
2. "Stand Up, Stand Up for Jesus" – 1:12
3. "Lord of All Hopefullness/All Through the Night" – 3:40
4. "Oh Come, Oh Come Emmanuel" (John Mason Neale) – 2:37
5. "Two American Folk Hymns" – 2:20
6. "For All the Beauty of the Earth" – 1:37
7. "St. Patrick's" – 1:51
8. "Holy, Holy, Holy" – 1:58
9. "Come Labor On" – 1:39
10. "St. Clement's" – 1:51
11. "For All the Saints" – 1:33
12. "At the Name of Jesus" – 1:23
13. "Come Thou Almighty King/Wild Western Hero" – 1:43
14. "Praise to the Lord" – 1:43
15. "Lord, I Want to Be a Christian in My Heart" – 1:52
16. "Faith of Our Fathers" (Frederick William Faber) – 1:16
17. "Just as I Am" (Charlotte Elliott) – 1:22
18. "Let All Mortal Flesh Keep Silence" – 3:31
19. "Jesus Christ Is Risen Today" – 2:58
20. "Yes, Jesus Loves Me (Reprise)" – 0:40

== Personnel ==
- John Fahey – guitar
