= The New Possibility =

Studio album by John Fahey
- Released: 1968
- Genre: American primitivism, Christmas music
- Length: 40:06
- Label: Takoma
- Producer: John Fahey

John Fahey chronology
The Yellow Princess (1968)	The New Possibility (1968)	America (1971)

The New Possibility: John Fahey's Guitar Soli Christmas Album is a 1968 album by American folk musician John Fahey. It is a collection of solo-guitar arrangements of familiar Christmas songs and has been Fahey's best selling recording, remaining in print since it was first released. The album is especially noteworthy since holiday music had never before been played in Fahey's acoustic-steel string blues guitar style.

== History ==
As Fahey recounts, "I was in the back of a record store in July and I saw all these cartons of Bing Crosby's White Christmas albums. The clerk said it always sells out. So I got the idea to do a Christmas album that would sell every year." The New Possibility has been one of Fahey's best selling recordings, selling over 100,000 copies initially, and has been continually in print.

Fahey's original liner notes discuss the German-American theologian and Christian existentialist philosopher Paul Tillich's reference to the birth of Jesus Christ as "The New Possibility". Fahey notes the scholarly research on the secular and mythological/superstitious ideas connected with the "Christmas Story". These liner notes were removed in later reissues. When asked why, Fahey said, "I just didn't feel that way any more."

In 1979, Fahey said, "Well, the arrangements are pretty good, but on the other hand there are more mistakes on this album than on any of the other 17 albums I’ve recorded. And yet, here’s the paradox… this album has not only sold more than any of my others, I meet people all the time who are crazy about it. I mean really love it. What can I say. I’m confused."

Fahey recorded three more Christmas albums, in addition to re-recording the tracks of The New Possibility as Christmas Guitar, Volume One. There were numerous reissues on LP, 8-track tape, and cassette. Some later reissues confusingly used the cover art from the 1975 album Christmas with John Fahey Vol. II. A 2000 CD reissue of The New Possibility includes the entire contents of both that album and Christmas with John Fahey Vol. II.

John Fahey's Guitar Christmas Book, a folio of guitar transcriptions of songs from The New Possibility and Christmas with John Fahey Vol. II, was published by Stropes Editions in 1981. It is no longer in print.

== Reception ==
Professional ratings
Review scores
Source	Rating
AllMusic	3/5 stars 4/5 stars
The Encyclopedia of Popular Music	3/5 stars
The Great Folk Discography	4/10
The Rolling Stone Album Guide	3/5 stars

In his Mojo review of the 2000 reissue—which also includes Christmas with John Fahey Vol. II—critic Andrew Male wrote, "This beautiful collection of the American steel-string guitarist’s festive efforts, from 1968 and 1975, possesses a deliciously deep and spooky ambience, a disjointed jauntiness coupled with a frost-fall morning melancholy, Fahey’s guitar somehow sounding like an Elizabethan harpsichord grown wild and mad out in the Appalachian mountains." However, another Mojo article, "How to Buy Fahey", dismisses these recordings as "Cliff-territory bland".

Jonathan Widran, for AllMusic, writes that it "reminds one of the simple charms of the season and how easy it is to capture that when you keep a no-frills approach. Because he rarely varies the tempos among the tracks—he's mostly in the slow to gently loping ballad mode—the songs have a slight tendency to run into each other."

In 2017, Pitchfork dedicated an article, "Why You Should Listen to John Fahey’s Christmas Music—Even If You Hate Christmas Music", to The New Possibility and Fahey's other Christmas releases, hailing the former as a "landmark" release and praising its experimental interpretations of Christmas music.

== Track listing ==
Side one

1. "Joy to the World" (Lowell Mason, Isaac Watts) – 1:52
2. "What Child Is This?" (William Chatterton Dix, Traditional) – 3:02
3. "Medley: Hark! The Herald Angels Sing/O Come All Ye Faithful" (Felix Mendelssohn, Traditional) – 3:10
4. "Auld Lang Syne" (Robert Burns, Traditional) – 2:01
5. "The Bells of St. Mary's" (A. Emmett Adams, Douglas Furber) – 2:10
6. "Good King Wenceslas" (John Mason Neale) – 1:10
7. "We Three Kings of Orient Are" (John Henry Hopkins, Jr.) – 1:50
8. "God Rest Ye Merry Gentlemen Fantasy" (Traditional) – 3:00

Side two

1. "The First Noel" (William B. Sandys) – 2:12
2. "Christ's Saints of God Fantasy" (Hopkins, Traditional) – 10:12
3. "It Came Upon a Midnight Clear" (Edmund Sears, Richard Storrs Willis) – 1:28
4. "Go I Will Send Thee" (Traditional) – 3:00
5. "Lo, How a Rose E'er Blooming" (Michael Praetorius, Traditional) – 3:45
6. "Silent Night" (Franz Gruber, Josef Mohr) – 1:14

== Personnel ==
- John Fahey – guitar

Production notes:

- John Fahey – producer
- Tom Weller – cover art
