= John Fahey Visits Washington D.C. =

Studio album by John Fahey
- Released: 1979
- Genre: Folk
- Length: 43:30
- Label: Takoma

John Fahey chronology
The Best of John Fahey 1959–1977 (1977)	John Fahey Visits Washington D.C. (1979)	Yes! Jesus Loves Me (1980)

John Fahey Visits Washington D.C. is an album by American fingerstyle guitarist and composer John Fahey, released in 1979.

== History ==
John Fahey Visits Washington D.C. was Fahey's first album in four years. The same year, he sold Takoma, the independent record label he had started in 1959, to Chrysalis Records. Chrysalis eventually sold the rights to the albums, and Takoma was in limbo until bought by Fantasy Records in 1995. He cited the strain of running the label and its lack of direction as reasons for selling it to the UK-based company. Other sources refer to Fahey's disinterest in the business side of running Takoma, the company's debt, and the current poor business climate of the record industry.

He covers two songs by other guitarists – "Guitar Lamento" is by Brazilian guitarist Bola Sete from his album Ocean and "Death by Reputation" by Leo Kottke from his eponymous 1977 album.

It was rumored that an entire album known as the Nuthouse sessions was rejected, leading to the release of John Fahey Visits Washington D.C. instead.

== Critical reception ==
Professional ratings
Review scores
Source	Rating
AllMusic	3.5/5 stars
The Encyclopedia of Popular Music	3/5 stars
Record Collector	4/5 stars
Rolling Stone	4/5 stars
Spin Alternative Record Guide	7/10

Rolling Stone deemed the album "more cosmic than rocking, but cosmic at its most trenchant."

Music critic Richie Unterberger praised the album, noting the "stellar picking and an eclectic range of influences... Some of his characteristic moodiness emerges in passages from 'Ann Arbor' and 'Melody McBad'." From his review for the UK-based Record Collector, critic Sid Smith gave the album 4 stars, writing "... although the landscape may look and sound familiar, nothing is quite what it seems. Circuitous, complex lines are unfurled into rare, blooming chords in much the way a magician pulls flowers out of his pocket. However, it’s the gothic rumbles of "Guitar Lamento" that remind us how Fahey’s use of space and haunting repetition created glorious epic moods tempered with a bleak intensity that still resonates."

== Reissues ==
- John Fahey Visits Washington D.C. was reissued on CD in 2008 by Ace Records.

== Track listing ==
1. "Medley: Silver Bell/Cheyenne" (Fahey, Doc Watson, Bill Monroe) – 4:31
2. "Ann Arbor/Death by Reputation" (Fahey, Leo Kottke) – 8:11
3. "The Discovery of the Sylvia Scott" (Fahey) – 7:45
4. "Guitar Lamento" (Bola Sete) – 5:49
5. "Melody McBad" (Fahey) – 10:09
6. "The Grand Finale" (Fahey) – 7:05

== Personnel ==
- John Fahey – guitar
- Richard Ruskin – guitar (on "Medley")

Production notes

- John Fahey – liner notes
- Tom Davis – engineer
- Rob Shread – mastering
- Michael Boshears – remixing, mastering
- Dee Westlund – art direction
- Murry Whiteman – design
- John Van Hamersveld – design, illustrations
- Kris Needs – liner notes
