= Guitar (Peter Lang album) =

Studio album by Peter Lang
- Released: November 11, 2003
- Genre: Blues, folk
- Label: Horus
- Producer: Peter Lang

Peter Lang chronology
| Dharma Blues (2002) | Guitar (2003) | Live at Charlotte's Web (2007) |

Guitar is the title of a recording by American folk and blues guitarist Peter Lang, released in 2003. It was recorded entirely on 12-string guitar.

The title "Snaker Ray Has Come & Gone" refers to St. Paul, Minnesota musician Dave "Snaker" Ray of the folk-blues trio Koerner, Ray & Glover.

== Reception ==
Professional ratings
Review scores
| Source | Rating |
|---|---|
| Allmusic | 4/5 stars |

Allmusic reviewer Thom Jurek states in his review: "This is guitar music that matters because it is played not only with technical acumen and a sense of history, but with an aesthetic that celebrates and pushes the tradition in new directions."

== Track listing ==
All songs by Peter Lang.

1. "Little Cairo" – 5:03
2. "After the Fall" – 5:19
3. "Come Along Joe" – 1:48
4. "John Hurt in the 21st Century" – 3:01
5. "I Should Have Known" – 1:48
6. "Brick House Blues" – 2:55
7. "Snaker Ray Has Come & Gone" – 4:08
8. "Emily's Waltz" – 2:45
9. "Daylight Is Darkness" – 2:41
10. "Witness to the Messenger" – 8:37
11. "All Through My Life" – 12:34

== Personnel ==
- Peter Lang – guitar, engineer, cover art, liner notes
