= Old Fashioned Love (John Fahey album) =

Studio album by John Fahey
- Released: 1975
- Recorded: 1975
- Studio: Blue Rock Studio, New York City and United/Western Recorders, Hollywood, CA
- Genre: Folk
- Length: 35:31
- Label: Takoma, Sonet (UK issue)
- Producer: Doug Decker

John Fahey chronology
Leo Kottke, Peter Lang & John Fahey (1974)	Old Fashioned Love (1975)	Christmas with John Fahey Vol. II (1975)

Old Fashioned Love is an album by American fingerstyle guitarist and composer John Fahey, released in 1975. It is credited on the cover to John Fahey & His Orchestra.

== History ==
In a similar manner as his previous Reprise releases with accompanists, Old Fashioned Love did not sell well. For his part, Fahey remarked that he had never worked with such sympathetic, understanding musicians as he did on this release.

The front cover is a 1901 photograph of Anna Held, the wife of impresario Florenz Ziegfeld.

Woody Mann plays duets with Fahey on "In a Persian Market", "Jaya Shiva Shankarah", and "Marilyn". Guitarist Stefan Grossman responded to "The Assassination of Stephan [sic] Grossman" with his own composition, "The Assassination of John Fahey" on his album Thunder on the Run. "Dry Bones in the Valley" was shortened by one minute on subsequent CD reissues.

The 1930s title song, written by Frank Loesser and Fritz Miller, was the theme song of Fritz Miller and his Orchestra.

== Critical reception ==
Professional ratings
Review scores
Source	Rating
AllMusic	4/5 stars
The Encyclopedia of Popular Music	3/5 stars
The Great Folk Discography	6/10
Pitchfork	8.4/10
The Rolling Stone Album Guide	3.5/5 stars

In his AllMusic review, Richard Foss states that Old Fashioned Love "is a wonderful release, a celebration of early 20th century musical styles. Every track is played with charm and wit, from the solo guitar pieces to the full orchestral works", and also notes that it "was acclaimed by many critics but was rejected by the folk crowd that Fahey himself was coming to detest." Critic Andy Beta called it "a consistently surprising collection of Fahey's many loves" and singled out the final track for special praise as "one of his truly magical works".

== Reissues ==
- Old Fashioned Love was reissued on CD by both Takoma and Shanachie Records.

== Track listing ==
Side one

1. "In a Persian Market" (Albert Ketèlbey) – 7:41
2. "Jaya Shiva Shankara" (Traditional) – 4:59
3. "Marilyn" (Fahey) – 6:33

Side two

1. "The Assassination of Stephan Grossman" (Fahey) – 2:11
2. "Old Fashioned Love" (Frank Loesser, Fritz Miller) – 3:30
3. "Boodle Am Shake" (Jack Palmer, Spencer Williams) – 3:17
4. "Keep Your Lamps Trimmed and Burning" (Fred McDowell) – 3:06
5. "Dry Bones in the Valley" (Fahey) – 8:52

== Personnel ==
- John Fahey – guitar
- Bobby Bruce – violin
- Dick Cary – piano
- Joe Darensbourg – clarinet
- Nick Fatool – drums
- Woody Mann – guitar ("In a Persian Market", "Jaya Shiva Shankarah", "Marilyn")
- Allan Reuss – guitar, banjo
- John Rotella – saxophone
- Ian Westley – tuba
- Britt Woodman – trombone
- Jack Feierman – trumpet, vocals

Production notes:

- Doug Decker – producer, mixing
- John Fahey – producer, arrangements
- Jack Feierman – arrangements
- Joe Tarantino – remastering
- Sam Charters – reissue liner notes
- John Ayres – photography
- Josephine Ayres – photography
