= American Stock =

Studio album by Peter Lang
- Released: 1986
- Genre: Blues, folk
- Label: Aspen Records
- Producer: James Hauck

Peter Lang chronology
| Back to the Wall (1978) | American Stock (1986) | Dharma Blues (1986) |

American Stock is an album by American folk and blues guitarist Peter Lang, released in 1986. It is out of print. He would retire from the music business after this release before returning in 2002 with Dharma Blues.

All the titles were previously released with the exception of "Drifting Away", however many of the tracks were re-recorded for this album. The compilation Leo Kottke, Peter Lang & John Fahey included "When Kings Come Home", and "Toth's Song", albeit titled "Thoth Song".

== Track listing ==
All songs by Peter Lang unless otherwise noted.

=== Side one ===
1. "My Dear Mary Anne" – 3:09
2. "Going Down the China Road" (Peter Lang, Public Domain) – 3:29
3. "Halloween Blues" – 3:05
4. "Flames Along the Monongahela" – 7:39
5. "When Kings Come Home" – 4:12
6. "Drifting Away" – 4:13

=== Side two ===
1. "Rally Round the Flag/The Battle Hymn of the Republic" (George F. Root, William Steffe, Julia Ward Howe) – 1:26
2. "Quetico Reel/Poor Howard" (Lang/Huddie Ledbetter) – 3:25
3. "Wide Oval Rip-off" – 2:45
4. "Toth's Song" – 3:18
5. "Future Shot at the Rainbow" – 5:02
6. "Young Man, Young Man, Look at Your Shoes" (Lang, Traditional) – 2:41
7. "V/The Connecticut Promissory Rag" – 2:51
8. "There Will Be a Happy Meeting in Heaven Tonight" (Adger M. Pace) – 2:29

== Personnel ==
- Peter Lang – vocals, guitar
- Jim Price – violin, mandolin
- James Hauck – maracas
