= The Great Koonaklaster Speaks: A John Fahey Celebration =

Studio album by Various artists
- Released: June 19, 2007
- Genres: Blues, folk, Avant-garde
- Length: 64:24
- Label: Table of the Elements

Tributes to John Fahey chronology
The Revenge of Blind Joe Death: The John Fahey Tribute Album (2006)	The Great Koonaklaster Speaks: A John Fahey Celebration (2007)

The Great Koonaklaster Speaks: A John Fahey Celebration is a tribute CD to guitarist John Fahey released in 2007.

The sessions for the 1997 Fahey/Cul de Sac collaboration album The Epiphany of Glenn Jones marks the first appearance of "The Great Kooniklaster" [sic], as an Art Deco object Fahey acquired, named, and placed in the studio to bring focus to the sessions. Fahey used the term in a variety of ways. It appeared in the introduction of the guitar instruction book The Best of John Fahey as a "KoonaKlastier Konfectionary" and also appears in Fahey's book How Bluegrass Music Destroyed My Life.

== Reception ==
Professional ratings
Review scores
Source	Rating
Pitchfork Media	(8.2 of 10)
Record Collector	(5 stars)

Music critic Kris Needs of Record Collector gave the tribute album five stars and stated "With projects like this... Fahey still seems to be leading a not-so-quiet revolution from beyond the grave."

In his review for Pitchfork Media, Grayson Currin praised the album, calling it "a mighty tribute to a worthy subject' and "the clearest and most brazen picture of the onus and inspiration Fahey has left for modern music. Importantly, this is a tribute record, but it's not a covers record: Instead, it collects unreleased work from 11 current experimental acts that feel Fahey's influence and attempt to offer a glimpse of it here."

== Track listing ==
No.	Title	Performer	Length
1.	"Since I've Been a Man Full Grown"	Jack Rose	11:08
2.	"Spanish Flang Dang"	Greg Malcolm	5:13
3.	"Exorcise/Intone"	Ben Vida	7:24
4.	"Hood River Lap Dance"	Richard Bishop	4:25
5.	"My Babe, My Babe"	Michael Hurley	3:00
6.	"Overcome"	No-Neck Blues Band	3:46
7.	"Escapisms in a Comedic Forum"	Lichens	3:27
8.	"Red Apple"	Badgerlore	5:31
9.	"I Used to Strive for a Tree; Now I Thrive on a Mountain"	R. Keenan Lawler	4:06
10.	"Ceremonial Knives"	Pumice	4:53
11.	"Crossing the Susquehanna River Bridge"	David Daniell	11:31
