= Gate of China =

The Gate of China can refer to:

- Gate of China, Nanjing, the southern gateway to the city of Nanjing.
- Gate of China, Beijing, the former southern gateway to the imperial city in Beijing.

== See also ==
- China Gate (disambiguation)
