= The Wanting (Glenn Jones album) =

Studio album by Glenn Jones
- Released: September 13, 2011
- Recorded: December 12, 2010-April 20, 2011
- Genre: American Primitivism
- Length: 64:22
- Label: Thrill Jockey

Glenn Jones chronology
Even to Win Is to Fail (2011)	The Wanting (2011)	My Garden State (2013)

Professional ratings
Review scores
Source	Rating
Allmusic	4/5 stars

The Wanting is the fourth solo album by Glenn Jones, guitarist and founding member of the American instrumental band Cul de Sac. Mojo placed the album at number 33 on its list of "Top 50 albums of 2011."

== Track listing ==
1. A Snapshot of Mom, Scotland, 1957
2. The Great Pacific Northwest
3. The Great Swamp Way Rout
4. Anchor Chain Blues
5. Even to Win is to Fail
6. My Charlotte Blue Notebook
7. Menotomy River Blues
8. Of Its Own Kind
9. The Wanting
10. Twenty-Three Years in Happy Valley, or Love Among the Chickenshit
11. The Orca Grande Cement Factory at Victorville
