= Friends of Fahey Tribute =

Tribute album to John Fahey

Compilation album by Various artists
- Released: March 14, 2006
- Genre: Folk
- Label: Slackertone Records
- Producer: Tinh

Tributes to John Fahey chronology
I Am the Resurrection: A Tribute to John Fahey (2006)	Friends of Fahey Tribute (2006)	The Revenge of Blind Joe Death: The John Fahey Tribute Album (2006)

Friends of Fahey Tribute is a tribute album to guitarist John Fahey released in 2006.

== History ==
The Friends of Fahey Tribute project was produced by Tinh, a friend and student of John Fahey. All the performers were either friends, students or fellow-musicians influenced by Fahey's music and career.

All the performers donated their proceeds to the non-profit Village School Foundation in Viet Nam.

== Reception ==
Professional ratings
Review scores
Source	Rating
Allmusic	3.5/5 stars
Minor 7th	(no rating)

In his Allmusic review, critic Alex Henderson stated "This is a worthy tribute to an unjustly neglected giant of American music." and singled out the two tracks by Vietnamese guitarist Tinh as the album's most lovely. Erik Davis of Minor 7th praised the album, writing "All the players here do justice to the musical legacy of a man who still lives through the music he gave life to."

== Track listing ==
No.	Title	Writer(s)	Performer	Length
1.	"Steamboat Gwine 'Round de Bend (piano version)"	John Fahey	George Winston	7:23
2.	"I Remember John Fahey"	Tinh	Tinh	2:34
3.	"Spanish Nights"	Woody Mann	Woody Mann	4:26
4.	"How White's Restaurant Destroyed My Life"	Mark Lemhouse	Mark Lemhouse	2:09
5.	"In John Fahey There Is No East or West"		John Doan	4:34
6.	"Witness to the Messenger"	Peter Lang	Peter Lang	9:06
7.	"Evolution of Blind John Turtle"	Mitch Greenhill	Mitch Greenhill, Mayne Smith	3:02
8.	"Fahey at Bush Park"	Terry Robb	Terry Robb	2:30
9.	"Home/Auld Lang Syne"	Traditional	Tinh	4:53
10.	"Poor Boy"	Fahey, Bukka White	Peter Lang	2:54
11.	"Under the Volcano"	Stefan Grossman, John Renbourn	Stefan Grossman, John Renbourn	5:58
12.	"When Your Way Gets Dark"	Charlie Patton, Traditional	Paul Geremia	3:09
13.	"Impressions of Susan"	Fahey	Terry Robb	5:09
14.	"Why Haven't I Heard from You?"		John Fahey	5:45
15.	"Steamboat Gwine 'Round de Bend (harmonica version)"	Fahey	George Winston	3:19
