= A Tribute to John Fahey =

Compilation album by Various artists
- Released: 1979
- Genre: Folk
- Length: 36:29
- Label: Kicking Mule

Tributes to John Fahey chronology
| A Tribute to John Fahey (1979) | I Am the Resurrection (2006) |

A Tribute to John Fahey is a tribute album to guitarist John Fahey released in 1979. It is noteworthy in that, unlike subsequent Fahey tribute albums, it was recorded during his lifetime.

All the performers were then on Kicking Mule Records, a label co-founded by ED Denson, former Takoma Records co-founder and friend of Fahey.

== Track listing ==
| No. | Title | Writer(s) | Performer | Length |
|---|---|---|---|---|
| 1. | "Revelation on the Bank of the Pantuxent (sic)" | Fahey | Bob Hadley | 2:30 |
| 2. | "Joe Kirby Blues" | Fahey | Arvid Smith | 3:37 |
| 3. | "Desperate Man Blues" | Traditional | Stephen Connolly | 4:00 |
| 4. | "When the Springtime Comes Again" | Fahey | Woody Harris | 4:22 |
| 5. | "Sail Away Ladies" | Traditional | Arvid Smith | 3:53 |
| 6. | "Sunflower River Blues" | Fahey | Woody Harris | 3:26 |
| 7. | "The Death of Clayton Peacock" | Fahey | Arvid Smith | 2:41 |
| 8. | "Sligo River Blues" | Fahey | Stephen Connolly | 2:23 |
| 9. | "The Yellow Princess" | Fahey | Arvid Smith | 2:23 |
| 10. | "In Christ There Is No East Or West" | Traditional | Stephen Connolly | 2:04 |
| 11. | "Poor Boy" | Fahey, Bukka White | Arvid Smith | 2:39 |
