= The Revenge of Blind Joe Death: The John Fahey Tribute Album =

Compilation album by Various artists
- Released: August 22, 2006
- Genre: American Folk, Blues, American primitive guitar, New Acoustic
- Label: Takoma
- Producer: Jon Monday

Tributes to John Fahey chronology
Friends of Fahey Tribute (2006)	The Revenge of Blind Joe Death: The John Fahey Tribute Album (2006)	The Great Koonaklaster Speaks: A John Fahey Celebration (2007)

The Revenge of Blind Joe Death: The John Fahey Tribute Album is a tribute CD to guitarist John Fahey released in 2006 by Takoma Records.

== History ==
This John Fahey tribute album was produced by Jon Monday, former art director and later vice president and general manager of Fahey's label, Takoma Records. It contains a collection of interpretations of Fahey compositions and original compositions played in Fahey's style. All the performers were either friends, students, collaborators or label-mates of Fahey.

The final song, recorded to sound like a scratchy 78 rpm record, is credited to Blind Joe Death himself, Fahey's alter-ego during his early career. The actual performer is not revealed.

== Reception ==
Professional ratings
Review scores
Source	Rating
Allmusic	3.5/5 stars
PopMatters	7/10 stars

In his Allmusic review, critic Mark Deming praised the album and many of the performances, but also wrote "... the sense of creative adventure and musical risk that was so much a part of John Fahey's music is largely missing, and a number of the guitarists here offer renditions that are so close to the sound and style of the original that they seem almost pointless except as a show of technique..." and that it is "a well-intentioned labor of love, but its polished surfaces lack the edgy textures that were so important to Fahey's work"

Daniel Spicer of PopMatters singled out specific performances as "less successful" as others, but called the album "commendable and hugely enjoyable tribute to a unique giant of American music." He singles out George Winston's harmonica version of "Sally Goodin" as "a relentless, barrage of percussive blowing that whips up a dark vortex of drones and overtones, dragging the listener down to a tiny point of non-existence. It really must be heard to be believed."

== Track listing ==
No.	Title	Writer(s)	Performer	Length
1.	"Sunflower River Blues"	John Fahey	Dale Miller	3:13
2.	"Sally Goodin"	Traditional	George Winston	2:44
3.	"St. Louis Blues"	W. C. Handy	Michael Gulezian	4:34
4.	"The Alligator Walks Sideways on Sunday"		Alex de Grassi	2:53
5.	"Desperate Man Blues"	Traditional	Charlie Schmidt	3:38
6.	"Dance of the Inhabitants of the Palace of King Phillip XIV of Spain"	Fahey	Canned Fish	4:08
7.	"Sun Gonna Shine on my Mardis Gras"		David Doucet	3:38
8.	"Thinking of John Fahey"		Country Joe McDonald	2:12
9.	"In Christ There Is No East or West"	Traditional	Peter Lang	2:09
10.	"Joe Kirby Blues"	Fahey	Terry Robb	3:06
11.	"The Yellow Princess"	Fahey	Sean Smith	5:35
12.	"Steamboat Gwine Round the Bend"	Fahey	Henry Kaiser and John Schott	7:10
13.	"Red Pony"	Fahey	Nick Schillace	3:25
14.	"Assassination of John Fahey"		Stefan Grossman	4:17
15.	"& 50 Cents Gets You a Cup of Coffee"		Rick Ruskin	3:29
16.	"Requiem for John Fahey"		Phil Kellogg	3:03
17.	"Days Have Gone By in the Halls of Valhalla"		Andrew Stranglen	2:37
18.	"On the Banks of the Owchita"	Fahey	Nels Cline and Elliott Sharp	3:42
19.	"Jesus is a Dying-Bed Maker"	Traditional	Pat O'Connell	3:56
20.	"John Henry"	Traditional	Blind Joe Death	2:24
