= Lycurgus (album) =

Studio album by Peter Lang
- Released: 1975
- Recorded: Minneapolis, MN
- Genre: Blues, folk
- Label: Flying Fish

Peter Lang chronology
The Thing at the Nursery Room Window (1973)	Lycurgus (1975)	Prime Cuts (1977)

Professional ratings
Review scores
Source	Rating
Allmusic	Not rated link

Lycurgus is the title of a recording by American folk and blues guitarist Peter Lang, released in 1975. It was nominated for a Grammy Award in the Folk music category. Lycurgus was a "Top National Add-on" and "Breakout" in Billboard Magazine. It was reissued in 2003 on the Horus label with additional tracks.

== Track listing ==
All songs by Peter Lang unless otherwise noted.

1. "Round Worm Reel" – 2:05
2. "That Will Never Happen No More" (Blind Blake) – 2:46
3. "Green Apple Quick Step" – 2:16
4. "Untitled Oblivion" – 3:03
5. "Lycurgus" – 3:44
6. "Poor Howard" (Lead Belly) – 2:43
7. "Let the Old Boy Go" – 2:23
8. "V/ The Connecticut Promissory" – 2:54
9. "Zero Adjustment" – 2:55
10. "Flames Along the Monongahela" – 7:46
  2003 reissue bonus tracks:
11. "Untitled Oblivion" (instrumental) – 3:18
12. "V/The Connecticut Promissory Rag" (alternate take) – 2:44
13. "Zero Adjustment" (instrumental) – 3:15
14. "Hello Baby Blues" (Danny Kalb) – 1:58
15. "Stackolee" – 1:18

== Personnel ==
- Peter Lang – guitar, vocals
- Cal Hand – dobro, pedal steel guitar
- Dick Hedlund – bass
- Bill Hinkley – mandolin
- John Lang – voices
- Craig Ruble – violin
- Bill Evans – bass
- Peter Ostroushko – mandolin
- Butch Thompson – clarinet, piano

== Production ==
- Produced by Peter Lang
- Engineered by Paul Martinson, Tom Mudge and Dave "Snaker" Ray
- Editing and remastering by Michael McKern
- Cover art by Patrick Finnerty
