= Prime Cuts (Peter Lang album) =

Live album by Peter Lang
- Released: 1977
- Recorded: 1977 at Iowa State University and University of Texas
- Genre: Blues, folk
- Label: Waterhouse Records
- Producer: Peter Lang, Gary Marx

Peter Lang chronology
| Lycurgus (1975) | Prime Cuts (1977) | Back to the Wall (1978) |

Prime Cuts is a live recording by American folk and blues guitarist Peter Lang, released in 1977. It was recorded at the Maintenance Shop at Iowa State University and The Texas Tavern at the University of Texas.

Prime Cuts was reissued on CD in 2003 on the Horus label with additional tracks.

== Track listing ==
All songs written by Peter Lang unless otherwise noted.

1. "Wide Oval Rip-Off" – 3:50
2. "Hello Baby Blues" (Danny Kalb) – 2:18
3. "Methane Gas" – 1:21
4. "Better Things for You" (Traditional) – 2:30
5. "Angel of Baffins Baby" – 2:58
6. "Rally Round the Flag/The Battle Hymn of the Republic" (George F. Root, William Steffe, Julia Ward Howe) – 2:33
7. "Brownsville Road" (Traditional) – 3:03
8. "That's All Right" (Dave Ray) – 3:20
9. "Muggy Friday/Adair's Song" – 2:08
10. "There Will Be a Happy Meeting" (Adger M. Pace) – 2:24
11. "Tuning" – 1:08
12. "Quetico Reel/Poor Howard" (Lang/Huddie Ledbetter) – 4:02
13. "Future Shot at the Rainbow" – 5:14
14. "Round Worm Reel" – 2:20
  2003 reissue bonus tracks:
15. "Rally Round the Flag/Battle Hymn of the Republic" – 1:29
16. "That's Alright" (Ray) – 3:57
17. "There Will Be a Happy Meeting" (Traditional) – 2:29

== Personnel ==
- Peter Lang – guitar, mandolin, vocals

== Production ==
- Produced by Peter Lang and Gary Marx
- Editing and remastering by Michael McKern
- Design by Ted Sharpe
- Photography by Mike Zagaris
