= Michael Gulezian =

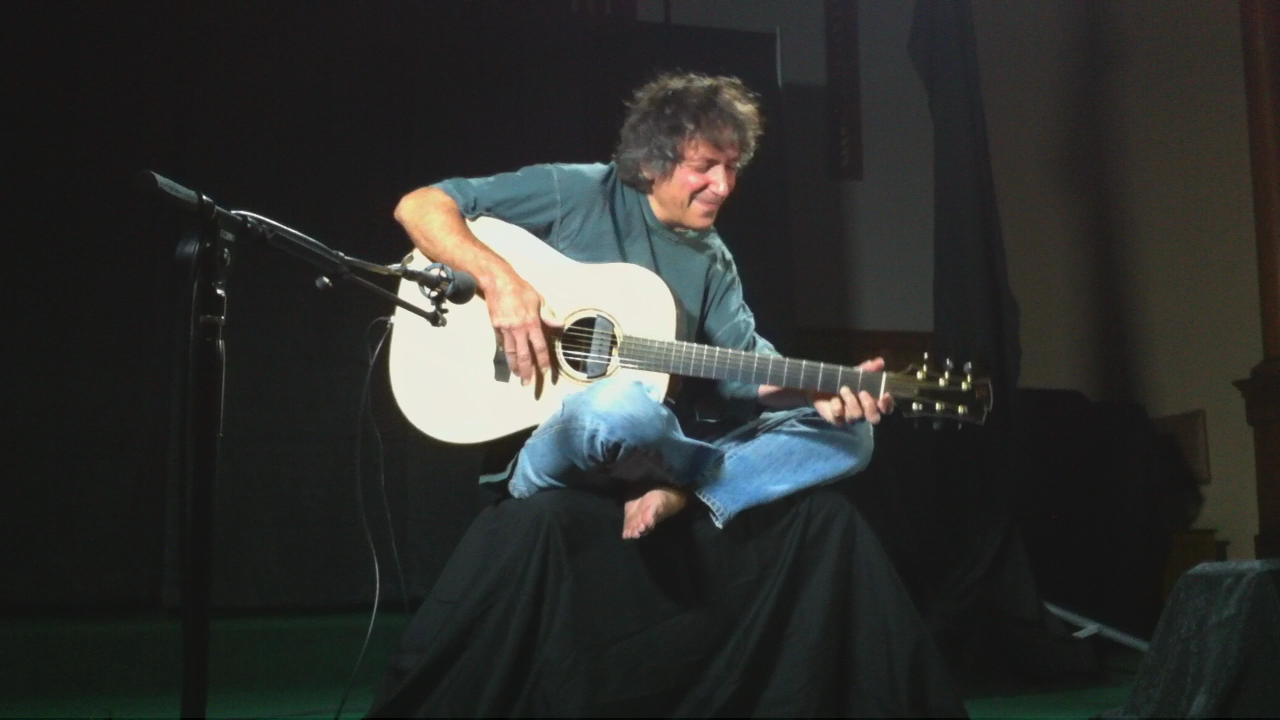
- Michael Gulezian

Background information
- Origin: Newark, New Jersey
- Genres: American primitive guitar, New Acoustic
- Occupation(s): Musician, composer
- Instrument: Guitar
- Years active: 1979–present
- Labels: Timbreline Music / Takoma
- Website: www.timbrelinemusic.com

Michael Gulezian is an American composer and fingerstyle guitarist. He is noted for dramatic compositions, a penchant for manipulating metre, an affinity for open tunings, and an unconventionally free two-handed technical approach. Gulezian's use of bottleneck slide on 12-string guitar, coupled with his command of reverse analog reverbs have made his recordings notable for their dream-like sonic atmosphere. Gulezian inhabits a musical territory between his mentor John Fahey and Gulezian's friend and colleague Michael Hedges.

== Biography ==
Gulezian was born 1957 in Newark, New Jersey. He began playing acoustic guitar at the age of six; although he never took formal lessons, he underwent years of self-imposed classical guitar training. He was influenced by his mother, who sang Armenian folk songs, and his father, classical Middle-Eastern oud virtuoso and Pharonic Egyptian ethnomusicologist H. Aram Gulezyan. Gulezian immersed himself in his Armenian cultural heritage, Middle Eastern music, non-Western Indian and Chinese music, improvisational rāgas, as well as Western idioms such as Gregorian chants, rock, jazz and folk.^{,}^{,} In 1965 the family moved from the New York City area to Tucson, Arizona.

As a young guitarist he was influenced by the early Mississippi Delta fingerstyle guitarists: Mississippi John Hurt, Bukka White, Son House, and Robert Johnson, as well as their contemporaries from the Atlantic seaboard, Blind Blake and Reverend Gary Davis. Later he discovered and explored the music of John Fahey and Leo Kottke, and further broadened his musical horizons by listening to Keith Jarrett, John McLaughlin, Ravi Shankar and Sun Ra.

While attending Colorado's Holy Cross Abbey, Gulezian studied Joseph Campbell, Carl Jung, and James Joyce, who became a significant influence on his perception of language, music, linear time, Roman Catholicism, and temporal reality. While still in high school, Gulezian was introduced to John Fahey through Robbie Basho. After recording his first self-published album Snow on his own Aardvark Records imprint, Gulezian signed to John Fahey's Takoma Records label. Snow was re-released in 1980 (with minor modifications) to a global audience on Takoma/Chrysalis as Unspoken Intentions. It received international critical acclaim, and established Gulezian as a visionary artist; musicians such as Henry Kaiser and Michael Hedges cited Unspoken Intentions as a major influence. In the midst of Gulezian's accelerating professional success, the Takoma label went bankrupt. Disillusioned with the music industry, Gulezian returned to college and graduated with honors, with degrees in entrepreneurship and marketing from the University of Arizona’s Eller Center for the Study of the Private Market Economy.

Upon graduation Gulezian returned to a career in music. He founded the Timbreline Music label, releasing his third album Distant Memories & Dreams in 1992. He began touring again and released his fourth CD The Dare of an Angel in 1994. In 1997 Gulezian moved to Nashville, Tennessee. In 2002 Unspoken Intentions was reissued on CD by Fantasy Records. His fifth CD was released in 2003 - the incendiary Language of the Flame, and followed in 2005 by the live recording Concert at St. Olaf College.

In recent years Gulezian has played hundreds of concerts, and continues to present guitar workshops and master classes at colleges and universities across the United States. In addition to his live concerts, Gulezian has been featured in the United States on many radio and television broadcasts, and is regularly heard on NPR.

== Discography ==
- Snow (1979, Aardvark Records)
- Unspoken Intentions (1980, Takoma/Fantasy)
- Distant Memories and Dreams (1990, Timbreline Music)
- The Dare Of An Angel (1994, Timbreline Music)
- Language of the Flame (2001, Timbreline Music)
- Concert at St. Olaf College (2004, Timbreline Music)
- thunder heaven light (2019, Timbreline Music)

=== Collaborations, Compilations ===
- Lights Out 5 (1995, KINK FM 102)
- Lágrimas de arpa y luna (1996, Resistencia)
- Takoma Eclectic Vol. 2 (1998, Takoma Records)
- Takoma Slide (1999, Takoma Records)
- 156 Strings: Nineteen Totally Original Acoustic Guitarists (2002, Cuneiform)
- Bridges 9 (2003, Pennsylvania Public Radio Associates)
- The KUMD Sessions: Live from the Music Room #2 (2003, KUMD)
- Lights Out 9 (2004, KINK FM 102/Boyd Coffee Company)
- The Revenge of Blind Joe Death: The John Fahey Tribute Album (2006, Fantasy Records)

=== Books, Sheet Music ===
- Ian and Nisa. Individual transcription (2004, Stropes Editions)
- Between the Strings – The Secret Lives of Guitars (2004, Mel Bay Publications)
