= Ace Cannon =

American saxophonist (1934–2018)

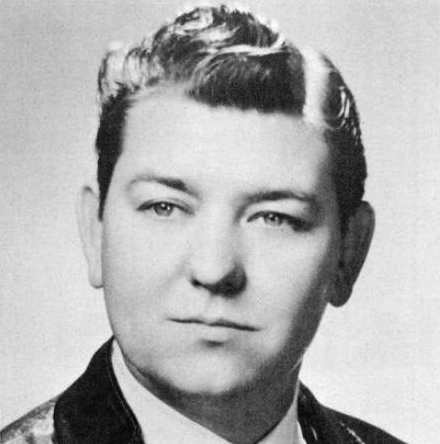
- Cannon in 1968

Background information
- Born: John Henry Cannon; May 5, 1934; Grenada, Mississippi, U.S.
- Died: December 6, 2018 (aged 84) Calhoun City, Mississippi, U.S.
- Occupation: Musician
- Instrument: Saxophone
- Label: Hi

John Henry "Ace" Cannon (May 5, 1934 – December 6, 2018) was an American tenor and alto saxophonist. He played and toured with Hi Records stablemate Bill Black's Combo, and started a solo career with his record "Tuff" in 1961, using the Black combo as his backing group. "Tuff" hit No. 17 on the U.S. Billboard Hot 100 in 1962, and the follow-up single "Blues (Stay Away from Me)" hit No. 36 that same year. In April 1965, he released Ace Cannon Live (HL 12025); according to the liner notes by Nick Pesce the album was recorded in front of a live audience inside Hi's recording studio, and Pesce claims this was the first time such an album had ever been recorded (as opposed to previous live albums recorded in concert venues).

Cannon was inducted into the Rockabilly Hall of Fame in 2000. In May 2007, his hometown of Calhoun City, Mississippi, hosted its first annual Ace Cannon Festival, and on December 9, 2008, he was honored with induction into the Mississippi Musicians' Hall of Fame.

After years of traveling and entertaining fans the world over, he moved back to Calhoun City in the late 1980s, where he resided until his death. He played numerous dates each year, and would be found most days working on his golf game at his home course.

He died at his home on December 6, 2018, at the age of 84.

== Selected discography ==
=== Albums ===
- 1962 - Tuff-Sax (US Hot Albums No. 24)
- 1964 - Plays the Great Show Tunes
- 1964 - Aces Hi
- 1964 - The Moanin' Sax of Ace Cannon
- 1964 - Christmas Cheers from Ace Cannon (US Hot Albums No. 44)
- 1965 - Live
- 1966 - Sweet & Tuff
- 1967 - Incomparable Sax of Ace Cannon
- 1967 - Memphis Golden Hits
- 1967 - The Misty Sax of Ace Cannon
- 1968 - Ace Cannon and His Alto Sax in the Spotlight
- 1969 - Ace of Sax
- 1969 - The Happy and Mello Sax of Ace Cannon
- 1970 - Cool 'n Saxy
- 1971 - Blowing Wild
- 1972 - Cannon Country - Ace, That is!
- 1973 - Country Comfort
- 1973 - Baby Don't Get Hooked on Me
- 1974 - That Music City Feeling
- 1975 - Super Sax Country Style
- 1975 - Sunday Blues
- 1976 - Peace in the Valley
- 1977 - Moody Sax From Memphis
- 1977 - Sax Man
- 1978 - After Hours
- 1979 - Feeling Old Feelings
- 1980 - Golden Classics
- 1980 - At His Best
- 1981 - The Entertainer
- 1981 - Saxy Sounds of Ace Cannon
- 1982 - The Golden Sax of Ace
- 1982 - Volume Two
- 1983 - A Holiday with Ace
- 1984 - Ace Cannon and Al Hirt – All-Time Country Greats
- 1984 - A Christmas Mood
- 1984 - Ace in the Hole
- 1986 - Best Loved Favorites
- 1987 - For the Good Times
- 1987 - Ace Cannon, Al Hirt – Help Me Make It Through the Night
- 1992 - Blue Eyes Crying in the Rain
- 1993 - Sweet Dreams
- 1993 - Music for Lovers
- unknown - Beautiful Sax
- unknown - Afternoon Delight
- unknown - Lyin' Eyes

=== Singles ===
Year	Title	Chart positions	Album
Year	Title	US	Album
1961	"Tuff" ^{A}	17	Tuff-Sax
1962	"Blues (Stay Away From Me)"	36	Tuff-Sax
1962	"Sugar Blues"	92	Singles only
1962	"Volare"	107	Looking Back With Ace Cannon
1962	"Rest / Big Shot"		Singles only
1963	"Since I Met You Baby"	130	Singles only
1963	"Cotton Fields"	67	Aces Hi
1963	"Swanee River"	103	Aces Hi
1964	"Searchin'"	84	Aces Hi
1964	"Empty Arms"	120	Nashville Hits
1965	"Sea Cruise"	135	Singles only
1966	"Funny How Time Slips Away"	102	Sweet and Tuff
1968	"By the Time I Get to Phoenix"	110	Incomparable Sax
1977	"Blue Eyes Crying in the Rain" ^{B}	—	Peace In the Valley

- ^{A} Peaked at No. 3 on US R&B chart
- ^{B} Peaked at No. 73 on US Country Singles
