= Cat Iron =

American singer

Cat Iron, real name William Carridine ('Cat Iron' was not his actual nickname, but a mishearing of his surname by his "discoverer"), (September 8, 1898 in Roxie, Mississippi United States – November 11, 1958 in Natchez, Mississippi) was an American blues singer and guitarist.

During the folk and blues revival, "Cat Iron" was "discovered" and recorded in 1957 by Frederic Ramsey Jr.; the recordings were released in the United States in 1958 on the Folkways label, in the United Kingdom in 1969 on the XTRA label. His song, "Jimmy Bell" has been covered by many other musicians, first by Koerner, Ray & Glover on their 1963 album, Blues, Rags and Hollers, later by Stoney & Meatloaf, The Numbers Band, Peter Lang, The Sharks, Tom Doughty and Watermelon Slim.

== Discography ==
- Cat Iron Sings Blues And Hymns (Folkways, 1958)
