= Rick Ruskin =

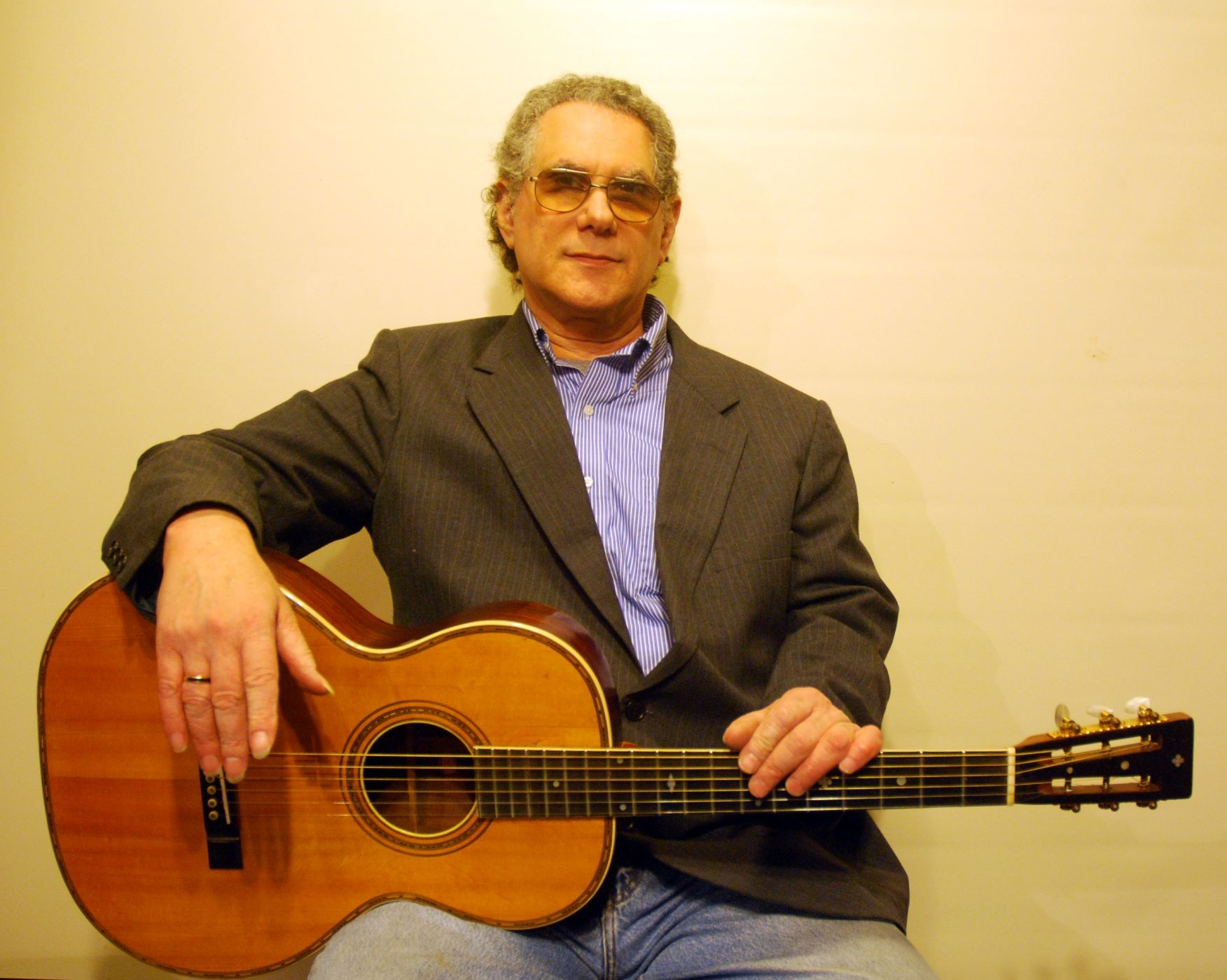
- Rick Ruskin

Background information
- Born: May 19, 1948 (age 77)
- Origin: Detroit, Michigan, U.S.
- Genres: American primitive guitar, folk, new acoustic, roots
- Occupation: Musician
- Instrument: Guitar
- Labels: Takoma Records, Liondog

Rick Ruskin (born May 19, 1948) is an American acoustic guitarist who recorded for Takoma Records with label mates John Fahey, Peter Lang, and Leo Kottke.

== Biography ==
While still in Jr. High, Ruskin opened for Reverend Gary Davis at Detroit's Retort Coffee House. This engagement resulted in an invite to spend the summer with Davis at his Long Island home. These events were pivotal for Ruskin who has often stated that if not for friendship and guidance from Davis, "Rick Ruskin the musician might not exist".

Ruskin was discovered in 1970 by the 12-string player, Dick Rosmini, who brought Ruskin to John Fahey's Takoma Records. Takoma had launched the careers of notable guitar artists including Kottke, George Winston, Peter Lang, Robbie Basho, Bola Sete, Mike Bloomfield and others.

Rosmini produced what became Ruskin's first of three Takoma releases, Richard Ruskin, followed by Microphone Fever and Six-String Conspiracy. Ruskin also contributed as session player and arranger of the duets on Fahey's second Christmas album, Christmas With John Fahey – Vol II.

In 2006, Ruskin participated in The Revenge of Blind Joe Death: The John Fahey Tribute Album, released on the revived Takoma label. His contribution, an original piece titled "& 50 Cents Gets You a Cup of Coffee", showcased his ability of the fingerstyle tradition alongside peers and label mates, such as Peter Lang and Stefan Grossman. Other artists on the album included George Winston, Country Joe McDonald, Henry Kaiser, Nels Cline, Elliott Sharp, Blind Joe Death, and "Canned Fish", a one-time collaboration between Adolfo "Fito" de la Parra of Canned Heat and Barry "the Fish" Melton of Country Joe and the Fish.

Ruskin has recorded and/or performed and toured with Jackie DeShannon, Olivia Newton-John, Tanya Tucker, Doc Watson, Rev. Gary Davis, Hedge & Donna, and the singer/actor Tim McIntire, among others. In addition, his music is taught in some countries, most notably, Japan and Italy.

== Discography ==
=== CDs ===
- Words Fail Me (Lion Dog – 1997)
- Once Upon A Time (Lion Dog - 2002)
- The Gospel According To (With Vivian Williams) (Lion Dog - 2005)
- How To Be Smarter Than Your Guitar (Lion Dog - 2010)
- Whatever Happemed To Blind Matzoh Leftkowitz (Lion Dog - 2015)
- Perfect Pitch (Lion Dog - 2020)
- Playlst (Lion Dog - 2023)

=== Downloadable collections ===
- In The Beginning (Lion Dog - 2006)
- Shoeless Joe (Lion Dog - 2024)
- Corvair's Exodus (Lion Dog - 2025)
- My Mother's Oldsmobile (Lion Dog - 2025)

=== LPs ===
- Richard Ruskin (Takoma – 1973)
- Microphone Fever (Takoma – 1975)
- Six String Conspiracy (Takoma – 1977)
- On The Cheap (with Lewis Ross) (Lion Dog Music – 1981)
- Songs, Hymns & Carols (with Lewis Ross) (Revere – 1984)
- Sounds Familiar (with Lewis Ross) (Revere – 1985)
- Against Tradition (with Karen Leigh Williams) (Sounding Board – 1987)

=== Instructional videos ===
- Acoustic Fingerstyle Guitar
- Fingerstyle Christmas
- Fingerstyle Grooves
- Band In Your Hand

=== Transcription books ===
- The Takoma Sessions
- Words Fail Me

=== Compilation albums ===
- The Revenge of Blind Joe Death: The John Fahey Tribute Album, (2006)
