= Wenxuecity =

Chinese news website

- Website type: Media
- Headquarters: Fremont, California
- Website: www.wenxuecity.com

Wenxuecity.com (Chinese: 文学城; pinyin: Wénxuéchéng), literally "Literature City," is a Chinese-language website targeting Chinese expatriates and people who work and/or study abroad, especially those reside in U.S.A. and Canada for both news service and entertainment purpose. Wenxuecity.com has its own editors reside in different locations, and they act as news reporters to cover selected news and local events. With limited original news, it collects news, gossip and editorial articles, both concerning China, North America and the world from other sources and news agency such as Radio France Internationale, Visual China Group, and China Network Television.

Wenxuecity.com has a broad influence as one of the largest overseas-Chinese websites, and it has been mentioned by other media such as the New York Times, VOA, China News and China Review News.

== Rankings ==
According to 2013 data, wenxuecity.com is ranked 2,531 globally and 810 in the U.S. on search engine traffic volume. Every 30 days, the number of average pageviews is over 2 billion, and that of unique visitors is close to 3 million. Within the 3 million unique visitors, over 90% are returning visitors. And about 60% of the total traffic comes from the US, while about 20% are from Canada. On average, they view about nine pages per visit and stay on the site for 14 minutes.
