= The Thing at the Nursery Room Window =

Studio album by Peter Lang
- Released: 1973
- Genre: Blues, folk
- Label: Takoma
- Producer: Kerry Fahey

Peter Lang chronology
The Thing at the Nursery Room Window (1973)	Lycurgus (1975)

The Thing at the Nursery Room Window is the title of the debut recording by American folk and blues guitarist Peter Lang, released in 1973. It was reissued in 2000 with three bonus tracks.

== Reception ==
Professional ratings
Review scores
Source	Rating
Allmusic	3/5 stars

Allmusic reviewer Alex Henderson wrote in his review: "This is essentially a folk recording, although Lang's brand of folk easily incorporates elements of southern country blues, bluegrass, and Appalachian music... Although the Minneapolis native has impressive chops, he never lets them get in the way of his down-home charm, and he never has a problem coming across as warm, unpretentious, and earthy."

== Track listing ==
All songs written by Peter Lang unless otherwise noted.

1. "Snow Toad" – 1:28
2. "Muggy Friday" – 1:34
3. "Last Days at the Lodge" – 3:24
4. "Turnpike Terror" – 2:28
5. "R.C. Rag" – 2:36
6. "Adair's Song" – :53
7. "Bitminous Nightmare" – 1:45
8. "Wide Oval Rip-Off" – 4:27
9. "Young Man, Young Man, Look at Your Shoes" (Lang, Traditional) – 3:52
10. "Quetico Reel" – 1:44
11. "Red Meat on the Road" – 2:59
12. "Future Shot at the Rainbow" – 9:47
  2000 reissue bonus tracks:
13. "Flames Along the Monongahela" – 7:43
14. "Medley: V/The Connecticut Promissory Rag" – 2:54
15. "Going Down the China Road" (Lang, Public Domain) – 3:29

== Personnel ==
- Peter Lang – guitar, vocals

== Production ==
- Produced by Kerry Fahey
