= Peter Lang (guitarist) =

- Born: January 6, 1948 (age 78)
- Origin: Minneapolis, Minnesota, U.S.
- Genres: American primitive guitar, folk, new acoustic, roots
- Occupation: Musician
- Instrument: Guitar
- Labels: Takoma, Flying Fish, Waterhouse, Aspen, Horus

Peter Lang (born January 6, 1948) is an acoustic guitarist who recorded for Takoma Records with John Fahey and Leo Kottke.

== Biography ==
Peter Lang was discovered in 1972 by guitarist John Fahey. Lang's first solo album, The Thing at the Nursery Room Window, was released in 1973. With Lang, Fahey launched the careers of other notable artists on Takoma Records, including Kottke, George Winston, Robbie Basho, Rick Ruskin, Bola Sete and others.

In the 1970s Lang recorded or performed with Ry Cooder, Jerry Garcia, Chet Atkins, John Hartford, The Nitty Gritty Dirt Band, Emmylou Harris, Freddie King, The Paul Butterfield Blues Band, John Hammond, Keith Jarrett, Phoebe Snow, Maria Muldaur, The Yellowjackets, and Robben Ford.

Lang left music in the 1980s to pursue a career in animation and special effects production. However, he released the albums Dharma Blues in 2002 and Guitar in 2003. Both Lycurgus and Prime Cuts were re-released in 2003 with bonus tracks.

== Awards and honors ==
- Best New Guitarist, Readers' Poll, Guitar Player magazine, 1974
- Grammy Award nomination for Lycurgus, 1975
- Best Guitarist, Minnesota Music Awards, 1981, 1982, 1988

== Discography ==
- The Thing at the Nursery Room Window, (Takoma, 1973)
- Lycurgus, (Flying Fish, 1975)
- Prime Cuts, (Waterhouse, 1977)
- Back to the Wall, (Waterhouse, 1978)
- American Stock, (Aspen, 1986)
- Dharma Blues, (Horus, 2002)
- Guitar, (Horus, 2003)
- Live at Charlotte's Web, (2007)
- Testament, (Horus, 2008)

=== Compilations ===
- Leo Kottke, Peter Lang & John Fahey, (Takoma, 1974)
- Friends of Fahey Tribute, (Slackertone, 2006)
- The Revenge of Blind Joe Death: The John Fahey Tribute Album, (2006)

== Bibliography ==
- Co-author of the book 20th Century Masters of Finger-Style Guitar, 1982, Stropes Editions, Ltd.
