= Cul de Sac (band) =

American rock group

- Origin: United States
- Genres: Post-rock, experimental rock, neo-psychedelia, avant-garde
- Years active: 1990–2009
- Labels: Shock Records; Nuf Sed; Lunar Rotation; New World of Sound; Earworm; Rough Trade / Capella; Northeastern; Flying Nun Records; Thirsty Ear; Strange Attractors Audio House
- Members: Glenn Jones; Robin Amos; Jon Proudman; Jonathan LaMaster; Jake Trussell

Cul de Sac were a rock group formed in 1990 in Boston, Massachusetts, and led by guitarist Glenn Jones. Their music is primarily instrumental. Jones and synthesist Robin Amos have been the only constant members.

They have been classified by some as post rock, but Jones has expressed some discomfort with the term. He states that Cul de Sac is the most "musically satisfying" group he's been involved with; a group that is the "closest to being the band I'd dreamed of forming. It allows me to combine my love of open-tuned guitar, played fingerstyle, with my love for electronics and noise, all placed within a rhythmic rock framework." Jones occasionally plays "The Contraption," a prepared lap steel guitar.

Cul de Sac performed at North East Sticks Together in 2006. They have collaborated with guitarist John Fahey and with Can singer Damo Suzuki.

The band has been inactive since 2009.

Glenn Jones has also recorded five solo albums, This Is the Wind That Blows It Out (2004), Against Which the Sea Continually Beats (2007), Barbecue Bob in Fishtown (2009), The Wanting (2011), and My Garden State (2013).

== Discography ==
- ECIM (1991)
- I Don't Want to Go to Bed (1995)
- China Gate (1996)
- The Epiphany of Glenn Jones (1997) - with John Fahey
- Crashes to Light, Minutes to Its Fall (1999)
- Immortality Lessons (2002) - live
- Death of the Sun (2003)
- The Strangler's Wife (2003)
- Abhayamudra (2004) - live - with Damo Suzuki
