= Glenn Jones (guitarist) =

American folk guitarist

- Born: October 1, 1953 (age 73); United States
- Genres: American primitive guitar, post-rock, experimental rock
- Occupation: Musician
- Instruments: Guitar, banjo
- Years active: 1983–present
- Labels: Strange Attractors, Thrill Jockey

Glenn Jones (born October 1, 1953) is an American guitarist, He is most recognized for his work in the experimental rock group Cul de Sac.

== History ==
At age 14, Jones picked up playing the acoustic guitar, which he purchased after hearing Axis: Bold as Love. During the early seventies, Jones discovered American primitive guitar and became influenced by Robbie Basho and John Fahey. It wasn't until he was asked by Robin Amos to join Shut-Up that he began playing an electric guitar. In 1989, he founded Cul de Sac with Amos in Boston, Massachusetts.

== Discography ==
- This Is the Wind That Blows It Out: Solos for 6 & 12 String Guitar (Strange Attractors, 2004)
- Against Which the Sea Continually Beats (Strange Attractors, 2007)
- Barbecue Bob in Fishtown (Strange Attractors, 2009)
- Even to Win is to Fail (split with 'Eastmont Syrup' by The Black Twig Pickers & Charlie Parr, Thrill Jockey, 2011)
- The Wanting (Thrill Jockey, 2011)
- My Garden State (Thrill Jockey, 2013)
- Welcomed Wherever I Go (Thrill Jockey, 2014)
- Fleeting (Thrill Jockey, 2016)
- The Giant Who Ate Himself and Other New Works for 6 & 12 String Guitar (Thrill Jockey, 2018)
- Vade Mecum (Thrill Jockey, 2022)
