= Robin Amos =

- Born: United States
- Genres: Post-rock, experimental rock
- Occupation: Musician
- Instruments: keyboards, vocals
- Years active: 1979–present
- Labels: Strange Attractors, Thirsty Ear

Robin Amos is an American keyboardist and founding member of the band Cul de Sac. His first band was The Girls, a punk band that Amos founded in the late 1970s with George Condo, Mark Dagley and Daved Hild. He continued to explore that band's sound with his next band Shut Up, which he formed with guitarist Glenn Jones.
