= John Fahey (musician) =

American fingerstyle guitarist (1939–2001)

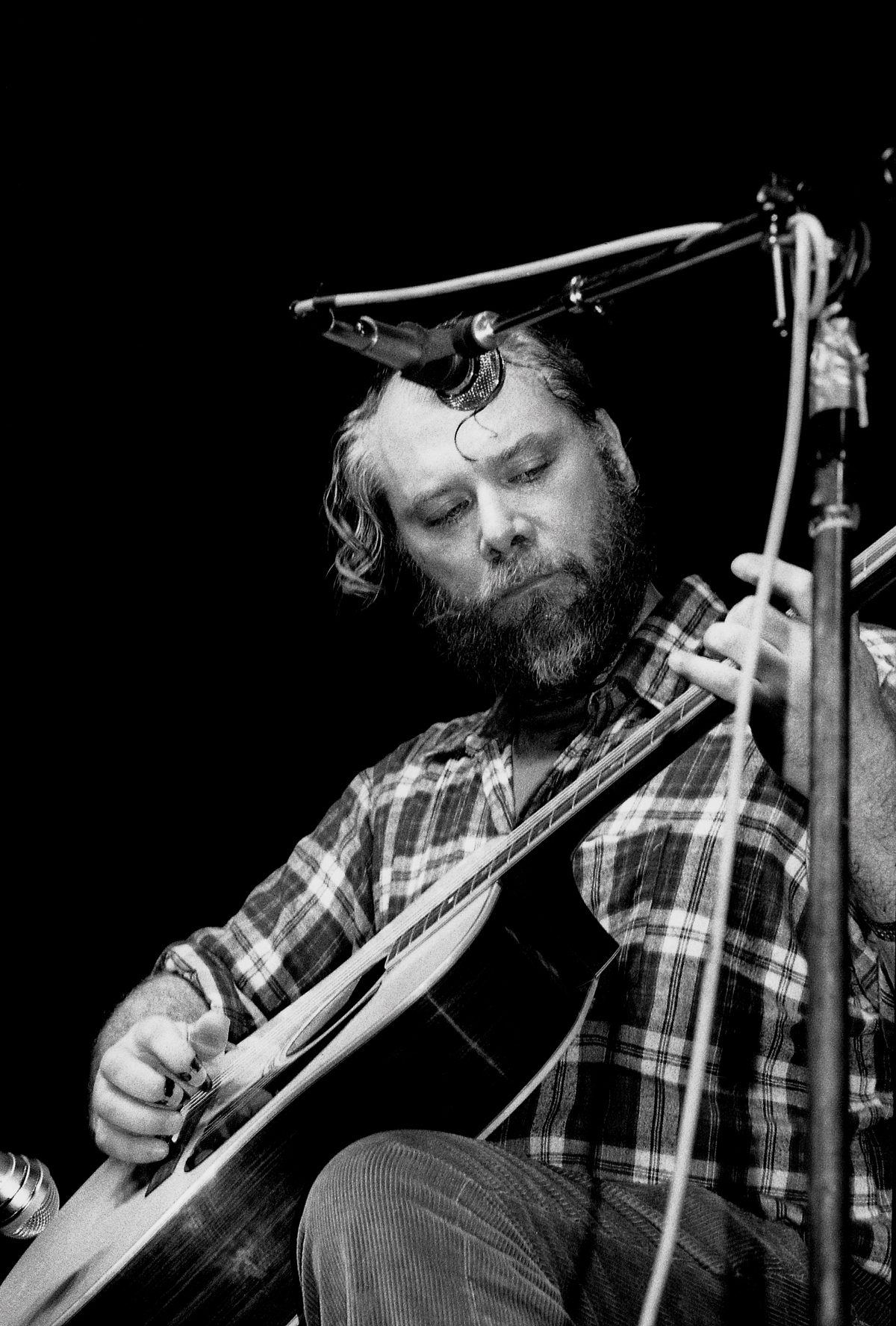
- Fahey performing in Paris, 1984

Background information
- Born: John Aloysius Fahey; February 28, 1939; Washington, D.C.
- Died: February 22, 2001 (aged 61) Salem, Oregon
- Genres: American primitive guitar; folk; avant-garde; country blues
- Occupation: Guitarist
- Instrument: Guitar
- Years active: 1959–2001
- Labels: Takoma, Vanguard, Reprise, Table of the Elements, Varrick, Revenant

John Aloysius Fahey (/ˈfeɪhi/ FAY-hee; February 28, 1939 – February 22, 2001) was an American fingerstyle guitarist and composer who played the steel-string acoustic guitar as a solo instrument. His style has been influential and has been described as foundational for the genre of American primitive guitar, a term borrowed from painting and referring mainly to the self-taught nature of the music and its minimalist style. Fahey borrowed from the folk and blues traditions in American roots music, having compiled many forgotten early recordings in these genres. He would later incorporate 20th-century classical, Portuguese, Brazilian, and Indian influences into his work.

Fahey spent many of his later years in poverty and poor health, but enjoyed a minor career resurgence in the late 1990s, with a turn towards the avant-garde. He also created a series of abstract paintings in his final years. Fahey died in 2001 from complications from heart surgery. In 2003, he was ranked 35th on Rolling Stone magazine's "100 Greatest Guitarists of All Time" list. In 2023, Rolling Stone ranked Fahey as 40th greatest guitarist of all time.

== Life and career ==
=== Early years: 1939–1959 ===
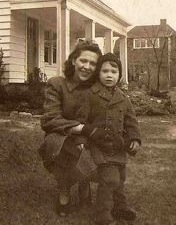
Fahey and his mother in Takoma Park, Maryland, 1945

Fahey was born into a musical household in Washington, D.C. in 1939. Both his father, Aloysius John Fahey, and his mother, Jane (née Cooper), played the piano. In 1945, the family moved to the Washington suburb of Takoma Park, Maryland, where his father lived until his death in 1994. On weekends, the family attended performances of the top country and bluegrass acts of the day, but it was hearing Bill Monroe's version of Jimmie Rodgers' "Blue Yodel No. 7" on the radio that ignited the young Fahey's passion for music.

In 1952, after being impressed by guitarist Frank Hovington, whom he met while on a fishing trip, he purchased his first guitar for $17 from a Sears, Roebuck Catalog. Along with his budding interest in the guitar, Fahey was attracted to record-collecting. While his tastes ran mainly in the bluegrass and country vein, Fahey discovered his love of early blues upon hearing Blind Willie Johnson's "Praise God I'm Satisfied" on a record-collecting trip to Baltimore with his friend and mentor, the musicologist Richard K. Spottswood. Much later, Fahey compared the experience to a religious conversion; he remained a devout disciple of the blues for the rest of his life.

As his guitar-playing and composing progressed, Fahey developed a style that blended the picking patterns he discovered on old blues 78s with the dissonance of 20th-century classical composers he loved, such as Charles Ives and Béla Bartók. In 1958, Fahey made his first recordings. These were for his friend Joe Bussard's amateur Fonotone label and were recorded under both the pseudonym "Blind Thomas" and under his own name. These recordings, individually pressed in very small runs, were reissued in 2011 as a box set under the title Your Past Comes Back To Haunt You: The Fonotone Years 1958–1965.

In 1959, Fahey recorded at St. Michaels and All Angels Church in Adelphi, Maryland, and that material would become the first Takoma record. Having no idea how to approach professional record companies and being convinced they would be uninterested, Fahey decided to issue his first album himself, using some cash saved from his gas station attendant job at Martin's Esso and some borrowed from Donald W. Seaton, an Episcopal priest at St. Michaels and All Angels. Thus was born Takoma Records, named in honor of his hometown. One hundred copies of this first album were pressed. On one side of the sleeve was the name "John Fahey"; on the other, "Blind Joe Death"—a humorous nickname given to him by his fellow blues fans. He attempted to sell these albums himself. Some he gave away, some he sneaked into thrift stores and blues sections of local record shops, and some he sent to folk music scholars, a few of whom were fooled into thinking that there really was a living old blues singer called Blind Joe Death. It took three years for Fahey to sell the remainder of the records.

After graduating from American University with a degree in philosophy and religion, Fahey studied philosophy at the University of California, Berkeley. Arriving on campus, Fahey, ever the outsider, began to feel dissatisfied with the program's curriculum. He later suggested that studying philosophy had been a mistake and that what he had wanted to understand was really psychology. He was equally unimpressed with Berkeley's post-Beat Generation, proto-hippie music scene, loathing in particular the Pete Seeger–inspired folk-music revivalists he found himself classed with. Eventually, Fahey moved south to Los Angeles to join UCLA's folklore master's program at the invitation of department head D. K. Wilgus, and received an M.A. in folklore in 1966. Fahey's master's thesis on the music of Charley Patton was later published by Studio Vista in 1970. He completed it with the musicological assistance of his friend Alan Wilson, who later joined Canned Heat.

=== 1960s and early 1970s ===
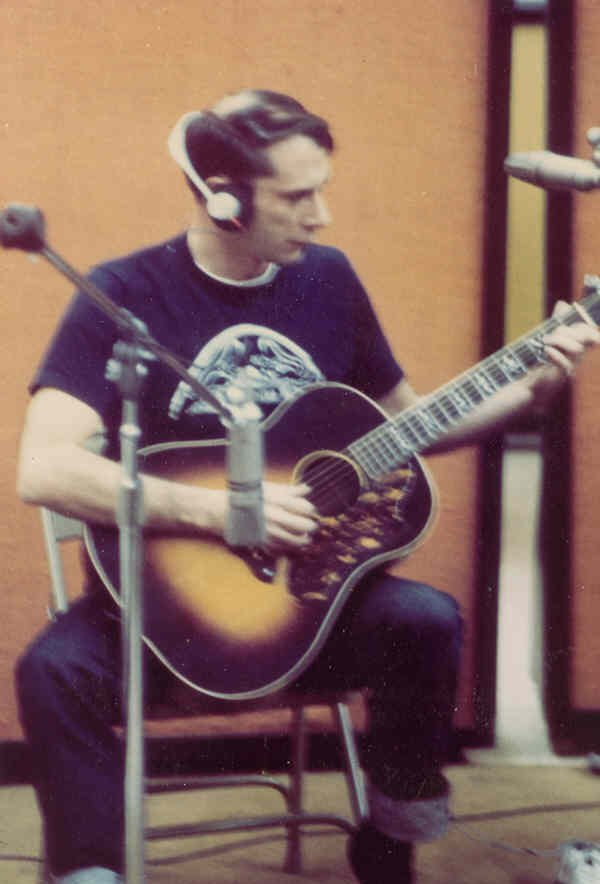
Fahey in studio with Recording King guitar, c. 1970

While Fahey lived in Berkeley, Takoma Records was reborn through a collaboration with Maryland friend ED Denson. Fahey decided to track down blues legend Bukka White by sending a postcard to Aberdeen, Mississippi; White had sung that Aberdeen was his hometown, and Mississippi John Hurt had been rediscovered using a similar method. When White responded, Fahey and ED Denson decided to travel to Memphis and record White. These recordings became the first non-Fahey Takoma release. Fahey released a second album on the label in late 1963, Death Chants, Breakdowns and Military Waltzes. To the duo's surprise, the Fahey release sold better than White's, and Fahey had the beginnings of a career.

His releases during the mid-1960s employed odd guitar tunings and sudden shifts in style firmly rooted in the old-time and blues stylings of the 1920s. But he was not simply a copyist, as compositions such as "When the Catfish Is in Bloom" or "Stomping Tonight on the Pennsylvania/Alabama Border" demonstrate. Fahey described the latter piece as follows:

The opening chords are from the last movement of Vaughan Williams' Sixth Symphony. It goes from there to a Skip James motif. Following that it moves to a Gregorian chant, "Dies Irae". It's the most scary one in the Episcopal hymn books, it's all about the day of judgment. Then it returns to the Vaughan Williams chords, followed by a blues run of undetermined origin, then back to Skip James and so forth.

A hallmark of his classic releases was the inclusion of lengthy liner notes, parodying those found on blues releases.

In the later half of the 1960s, Fahey continued to issue material through Takoma as well as Vanguard Records, which had signed him along with similar instrumental folk guitarists Sandy Bull and Peter Walker. Albums from this period, such as Days Have Gone By, The Voice of the Turtle, Requia, and The Yellow Princess, found Fahey making sound collages from such elements as gamelan music, Tibetan chanting, animal and bird cries and singing bridges. In 1967, Fahey recorded with Texas psych-rock trio The Red Crayola at the 1967 Berkeley Folk Festival, music that resurfaced on the 1998 Drag City release The Red Krayola: Live 1967. The Red Crayola subsequently recorded an entire studio album with Fahey, but the Red Crayola's label demanded possession of the tapes and recorded documentation of those sessions has been missing ever since.

He married his first wife Jan in 1969, traveling back to Maryland for his nuptials. During the spring of 1969, Fahey performed several East Coast shows, including several nights at the world renowned Cellar Door in Georgetown. In the summer, he toured the South and appeared at the Memphis Country Blues Festival on June 6 and 7th.

Fahey is immersed in country blues, from which he drives his own unique guitar music—eerie, funny, stately, and incredibly calm. The best tranquilizing music I know, because instead of palming off a fantasy of sodden deliverance it seems to speak of real reserves of self-control inside the American psyche.

— Of Rivers and Religion, reviewed in Christgau's Record Guide: Rock Albums of the Seventies (1981)

In addition to his own creative output, Fahey expanded the Takoma label, discovering fellow guitarists Leo Kottke, Robbie Basho, Bola Sete, Rick Ruskin, and Peter Lang, as well as an emerging pianist in George Winston. Kottke's debut release on the label, 6- and 12-String Guitar, ultimately proved to be the most successful of the crop, selling more than 500,000 copies. Other artists with albums on the label included Mike Bloomfield, The Fabulous Thunderbirds, Maria Muldaur, Michael Gulezian, and Canned Heat. In 1979, Fahey sold Takoma to Chrysalis Records. Jon Monday, who had been the general manager of the label since 1970, was the only employee to go with the new company. Chrysalis eventually sold the rights to the albums, and Takoma was in limbo until bought by Fantasy Records in 1995.

=== Later years ===
By the mid-1970s, Fahey's output had abated and he had begun to suffer from a drinking problem. He lost his home in the dissolution of his first marriage, remarried, divorced again, and moved to Salem, Oregon, in 1981 to live with his third wife, Melody. He soon met Portland guitarist Terry Robb who would serve as his producer, arranger and accompanist on several albums for Varrick, a subsidiary of Rounder Records. In 1986, Fahey contracted Epstein-Barr syndrome, a long-lasting viral infection, which exacerbated his diabetes and other health problems. He continued to perform in and around the Salem area, and was managed by friends David Finke and his wife Pam. The trio attempted to keep Fahey's career afloat through radio appearances and performances at small venues. Fahey broke up with his third wife, and his life began to spiral downward. He made what appeared to be his last album in 1990. Although he had recovered from Epstein-Barr syndrome after five years, he would spend much of the early 1990s living in poverty, mostly in cheap motels. Gigs had dried up because of his health problems. He paid his rent by pawning guitars and reselling rare records he found in thrift stores.

Following a 1994 entry on Fahey in Spin magazine's spin-off Alternative Record Guide, Fahey learned that he now had a whole new audience, which included the alternative bands Sonic Youth and Cul de Sac and the avant-garde musician Jim O'Rourke. A lengthy article in Spin magazine by Byron Coley, "The Persecutions and Resurrections of Blind Joe Death", combined with a two-disc retrospective, The Return of the Repressed, revived Fahey's career. New releases started to appear rapidly, alongside reissues, by Fantasy Records, of all the early Takoma releases. O'Rourke went on to produce a Fahey album, Womblife, in 1997. That same year, Fahey recorded an album with Cul de Sac, The Epiphany of Glenn Jones, named for the band's lead guitarist.

Fahey's passion for traditional folklore did not subside. After the death of his father in 1995, Fahey used his inheritance to form another label, Revenant Records, to focus on reissuing obscure recordings of early blues, old-time music, and anything else that took his fancy. In 1997, Revenant issued its first crop of releases, including albums by the British guitarist Derek Bailey, the American pianist Cecil Taylor, Jim O'Rourke, bluegrass pioneers The Stanley Brothers, old-time banjo legend Dock Boggs, Rick Bishop of Sun City Girls, and the slide guitarist Jenks "Tex" Carman. The label's most famous release would prove to be Screamin' and Hollerin' the Blues: The Worlds of Charley Patton, a seven-disc retrospective of Charley Patton and his contemporaries. It won three Grammy Awards in 2003. Fahey, for his part, won a Grammy in 1997 for his contributions to the liner notes of Revenant's Anthology of American Folk Music, Vol. 4.

In February 2001, six days before his 62nd birthday, Fahey died at Salem Hospital after undergoing a sextuple coronary bypass.

=== Tribute albums ===
By 2007, five John Fahey tribute albums had been released as a testament to his reputation as a "giant of 20th century American music".

- A Tribute to John Fahey (1979, Kicking Mule): An earlier tribute album released during Fahey's lifetime.
- I Am the Resurrection: A Tribute to John Fahey (2006, Vanguard Records - Co-produced by M. Ward and Stephen Brower): This album focused on modern interpretations by indie artists rather than strict traditional renderings of Fahey's work.
- The Revenge of Blind Joe Death: The John Fahey Tribute Album (2006, Takoma/Fantasy Records - Produced by Jon Monday): A homage featuring a mix of artists, including George Winston, Peter Lang, and Rick Ruskin from his original label (Takoma), as well as Henry Kaiser, Country Joe McDonald, and others.
- Friends of Fahey Tribute (2006, Slackertone Records - Produced by Tinh): A collection featuring various artists contributing to the legacy of the American primitive guitarist.
- The Great Koonaklaster Speaks: A John Fahey Celebration (2007, Table of the Elements): "The incorrigible spirit of the Great Koonaklaster, the title Fahey bestowed upon himself after his 90s comeback, lives on in this riotously diverse tribute from acolytes and friends gathered by the Chicago-based label which the guitarist frequented during the late 90s".

=== Paintings ===
During the later years of his life, Fahey painted a series of abstract paintings. Many of these were exhibited from July 10 to September 12, 2010, at The East Village, New York, presented by John Andrew and Audio Visual Arts (AVA). The exhibit featured 55 paintings, ranging in size from 6.75" by 9" to 22" by 29". The "sale sheet" for the exhibit listed prices from $750 for smaller works to $3,000 for the large paintings. The paintings were either framed or unframed. AVA described Fahey's paintings as follows:

Pulling inspiration from the 'French Primitive', untutored painters, Fahey often referred to his music as 'American Primitive'. The same alluring, raw, roots, mysterious, power, grit, obscure, industrial, ambient, epic, and tranquilizing aesthetics that one finds in Faheys music and his writings are equally present in his paintings. The 90s proved to be a decade of regeneration for Fahey. Though he struggled with certain health problems, he was brimming with experimentation. Collaborating with noise artists and improvisational performers of the alternative movement, Fahey began to channel a new outlet for experimentation which included his return to painting; a hobby he abandoned when he took up the guitar. Fahey's works are evocative of action painters and abstract expressionists. He painted on found poster board and discarded spiral notebook paper. His painting studio floated from motel bed to motel bed and eventually ended up on the bed of his rental home in Salem, OR; occasionally painting with anti-freeze in the garage. He worked with tempera, acrylic, spray paint, and magic marker.

Several of Fahey's paintings were sold on eBay by Michael R. Karn in July 2001. Karn attested,

John brought [these paintings] into the used book store I owned and operated, Balcony Books, located at 108 SW Third Street in Corvallis, Oregon, in December 1998. John had been shopping and trading with me for several years. I originally became acquainted with him several years earlier when I operated a similar store in Salem, Oregon, where John lived at the time. John often brought in books or records he had scouted, and exchanged them for books and records from our stock. He also generously signed several records and posters from my personal collection for me, and even performed a couple of in-store concerts.

Karn said he received several paintings "directly from John in exchange for a large collection of Duke Ellington records which I had recently obtained. He had recently taken up painting as a creative outlet. He was aware the paintings could be sold some day, even though he himself would not sell his paintings, but he understood the nature of the used book and record business, and gave his blessing to me to sell them in the store if I wished. I never did sell a painting in store, but recently [sold several] through auction at ebay."

== Documentaries ==
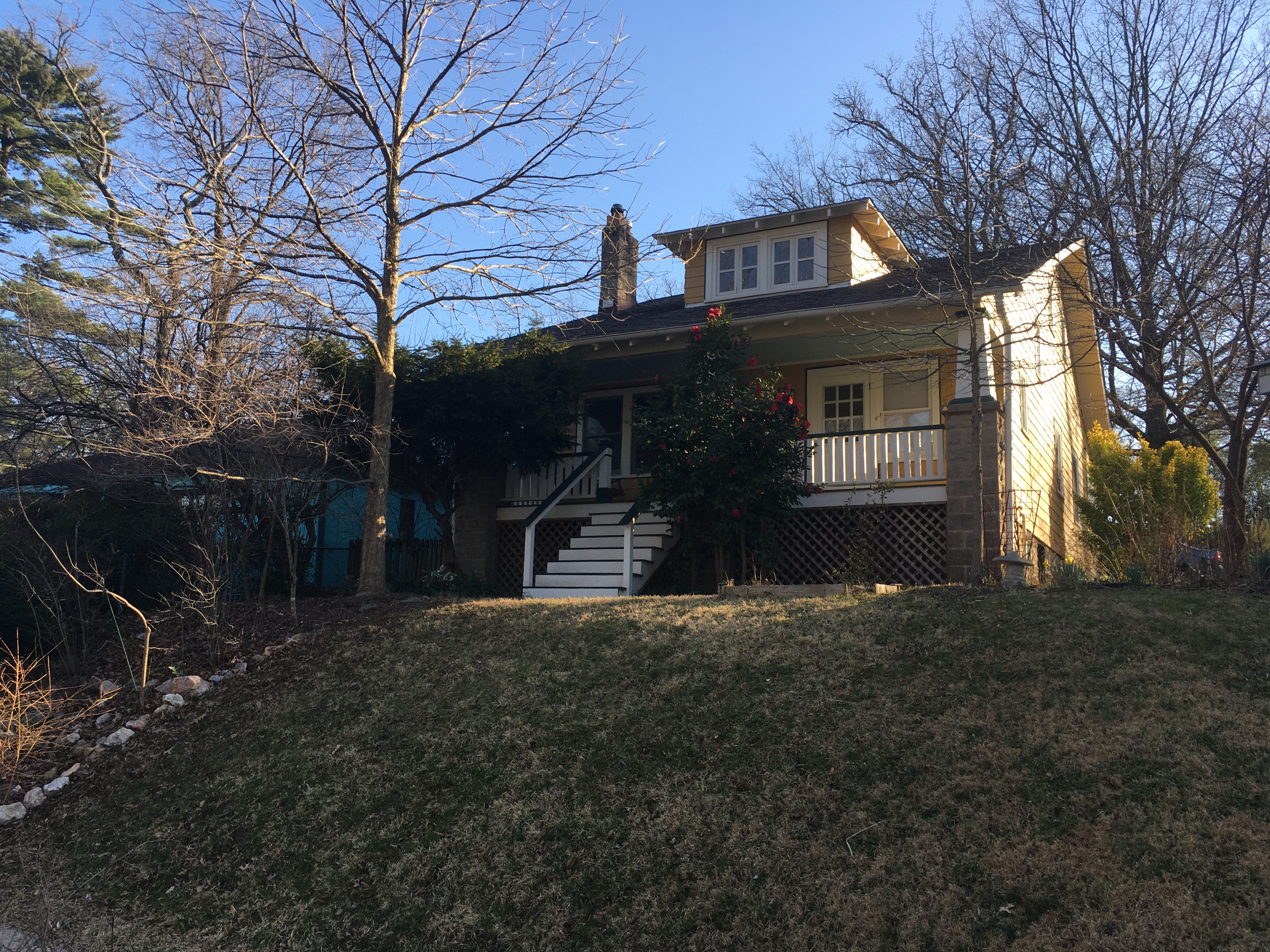
Childhood home of John Fahey

Starting work in 2007, filmmaker Marc Minsker produced a 30-minute documentary on Fahey's life entitled John Fahey: The Legacy of Blind Joe Death. It chronicles Fahey's early life in Takoma Park, and his success as a guitarist and record producer in California. It also follows Fahey through his dark days in Salem, and ends with commentary on his contributions to American music. The film premiered at the Takoma Park Film Festival on Friday, May 7, 2010. The screening was accompanied by a live performance and discussion with Fahey's friend, the guitarist Peter Lang.

A feature-length documentary directed by James Cullingham, In Search of Blind Joe Death: The Saga of John Fahey, was released in 2013.

== Written works ==
- Fahey, John (1966). A Textual and Musicological Analysis of the Repertoire of Charley Patton (MA). University of California, Los Angeles. LCCN 67003863. OCLC 1137380.
- Fahey, John (2020) [1970]. Charley Patton. Dover Publications. ISBN 9780486843445. LCCN 70548903. OCLC 1122922310.
- Fahey, John (2000). How bluegrass music destroyed my life : stories. Chicago: Drag City Incorporated. ISBN 9780965618328. LCCN 99075130. OCLC 44903282.
- Fahey, John (2003) [2003]. Vampire vultures. Chicago: Drag City. ISBN 9780965618373. OCLC 56846589.
