= Terry Robb =

Canadian guitarist (born 1956)

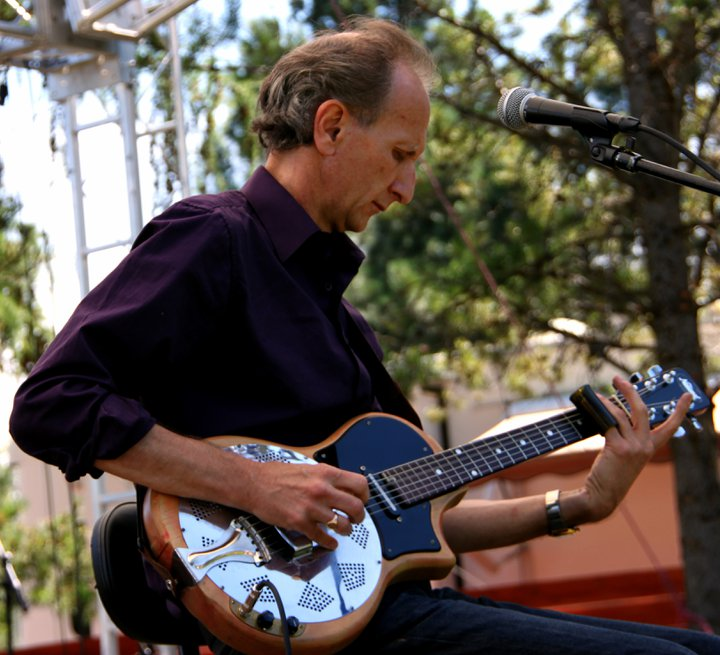
- Robb at the 2011 Bronze, Blues & Brews Festival

Background information
- Born: August 14, 1956 (age 70); Vancouver, British Columbia, Canada
- Genres: Blues; Americana; American Primitive Guitar; fingerstyle
- Occupations: Musician, Record Producer
- Instrument: Guitar
- Years active: 1978-present
- Labels: Yellow Dog, Rounder, Burnside Records, NiaSounds
- Website: www.terryrobb.com

Terry Robb (born August 14, 1956) is a Canadian fingerstyle guitarist, composer, arranger and record producer living in the United States. He plays electric and acoustic guitar, and is associated with the American Primitive Guitar genre through his collaboration with steel string guitarist John Fahey. He is a member of the Oregon Music Hall of Fame and Cascade Blues Association Hall of Fame, and was honored with the eponymous "Terry Robb" Muddy Award for Best Acoustic Guitar in 2011. His original compositions draw on the Delta blues, ragtime, folk music, country music and jazz traditions.

== Biography ==
=== Early life and career ===
Born in Vancouver, British Columbia, Robb moved to the United States with his parents, living briefly in Pittsburgh, before settling in Portland, Oregon, at the age of seven. He was immersed in music and the arts at an early age, and received his first guitar at age eight from an uncle who played swing guitar and was associated with the Lawrence Welk Orchestra. During the blues revival of the 1960s, he was exposed to blues, country, ragtime and early jazz musicians that were being rediscovered, as well as contemporary jazz and blues rock musicians, which led to a lifelong interest in the blues and Americana music. He began performing in bands at age 12, playing dances at local junior high and high schools, and was soon after performing solo sets in coffee houses around Portland. Following his graduation from Parkrose High School in 1974, he studied fine arts and music theory under Czech-American classical composer Tomáš Svoboda at Portland State University before receiving his baccalaureate degree in 1978.

After college, Robb joined multi-instrumentalist "Ramblin' Rex" Jacobosky, an associate of Frank Zappa and Captain Beefheart, touring as a duo throughout the Pacific Northwest. Through Jacobosky, Robb met guitarist Henry Vestine when Canned Heat performed at Murphy's and Me nightclub in Eugene, Ore., during their 1980 tour, where he was invited to join the band on stage and play Alan Wilson's guitar. When Vestine later moved to Oregon, Robb helped him get established in the local music scene, and occasionally joined on guitar during Canned Heat's Pacific Northwest performances. Robb also became acquainted with blues singer and harmonicist Curtis Salgado, who was a member of the Robert Cray Band at that time. When steel string fingerstyle guitarist John Fahey relocated to Salem, Ore., in 1981, a mutual friend gave him Robb's demo recording of "One Way Gal" by blues guitarist William Moore, and the two met backstage after Fahey's performance at Luis' La Bamba in Portland. These relationships proved to have significant influence on Robb's artistic style and guitar techniques, and led to subsequent recording collaborations and enduring friendships.

In 1982, Robb established himself as a solo artist with the release of the Terry Robb Band's debut 45 Psychedelta, followed by the LP Next Window which featured cover art by cartoonist John Callahan. In 1987, Robb's third recording, Nice Try, marked a departure from his electric band format in favor of solo acoustic fingerstyle guitar instrumentals and included guest performances by Fahey and Salgado. On Sensitive Guy, Robb returned to electric band recordings while retaining a comparable number of solo acoustic songs, an electric/acoustic hybrid format he would adopt in subsequent recordings and live performances. In 1990, a collaboration with Ike Willis, formerly of the Frank Zappa Band, led to Robb's fifth release Jelly Behind the Sun, featuring Willis as guest vocalist.

=== Later career ===
In 1994, Robb signed a multi-year recording contract with the Portland-based label Burnside Records, where he would release four albums and serve as producer, arranger and guitar accompanist on several recordings for other Burnside Records artists. His second Burnside release, Stop This World, featuring guest artists Maria Muldaur, Eddy Clearwater and Curtis Salgado, topped the Living Blues Radio Chart in 1997. During this time, Robb joined the supergroup Acoustic Guitar Summit with fellow Portland guitarists Mark Hanson, Paul Chasman and Doug Smith, performing throughout the West Coast in concert, TV and radio broadcasts, including "West Coast Live" with Sedge Thomson.

Robb's ongoing collaboration with Salgado, which included a national tour with Buddy Guy in 1995,^{[2]} led to a brief interlude to Lucky Records in 1997 with the release of Hit It 'n Quit It. This was followed by a national tour with the Steve Miller Band and a guest appearance on NBC's Late Night with Conan O'Brien, where Salgado and Robb performed their original composition "Bitter Tears" and Miller joined on guitar. The following year, Robb was invited to perform with the Oregon Symphony as a guest soloist.

After a decade with Burnside Records, Robb joined the roster of Yellow Dog Records based in Memphis, Tenn., where his album Resting Place was recorded at Sam Phillips Recording Studio under the direction of Roland Janes and released to critical acclaim in 2005.

In the 2012 documentary film In Search of Blind Joe Death: The Saga of John Fahey, Robb is featured among the friends and colleagues interviewed about Fahey's life and legacy, and he performs "When the Springtime Comes Again" on Fahey's Martin D76, as seen on the cover of The Best of John Fahey 1959-1977.^{[22]}

In 2016, Robb released his debut album with Portland-based record label NiaSounds, Cool on the Bloom. The album prompted Vintage Guitar writer Dan Forte to describe Robb as "...one of the best players, on acoustic and electric, embracing a range of blues styles and then some...", and feature an exclusive video performance of the title track song on its website. In 2019, Robb released Confessin' My Dues, his 15th solo recording and second album with NiaSounds, featuring renowned jazz musicians Gary Hobbs and Dave Captein.

Robb continues to tour as a solo guitarist and singer, performing a concert halls, theaters and festivals across the United States, Canada and Europe, such as the Waterfront Blues Festival in Oregon, Lillehammer Blues Festival in Norway and Vallemagia Blues Festival in Switzerland. As an educator, he has given workshops and master classes in fingerstyle blues guitar and slide guitar for Oregon State University, Portland State University, and Britt Festival in Oregon, Vancouver International Guitar Festival in Canada and Centrum (arts organization) in Washington, among other arts and education institutions.

=== Record production ===
Robb's foray into record production came at age 24 with an invitation by John Fahey to produce his forthcoming albums on Varrick Records, a subsidiary of Rounder Records.^{[4]} From 1982 to 1994, Robb served as producer, arranger, and occasional guitar accompanist on eight of Fahey's albums, including Let Go, the album which garnered Fahey a four-star review by Rolling Stone and marked a turning point in his career as he explored new genres such as Brazilian and contemporary pop music. Robb also produced the video recordings of "John Fahey Live in Concert" at The Freight and Salvage, "The Guitar of John Fahey, Vol. 1 and 2", and "Christmas Songs & Holiday Melodies" for Stefan Grossman's Guitar Workshop released in 1996.^{[4]} Robb and Fahey often performed together in concert throughout the West coast, appearing on TV and radio programs, and remained lifelong friends until Fahey's death in 2001.

During his years at Burnside Records, Robb served as the label's house producer for several of its recording artists, such as Alice Stuart, Sheila Wilcoxson and Bill Rhoades. He also became a frequent producer or session guitarist for other Pacific Northwest artists, such as Curtis Salgado, Duffy Bishop and Phil Kellogg.^{[28]}

In 2008, Robb launched the independent label Psychedelta Records with fellow guitarist Adam Scramstad to support the music of his students and other local musicians. Among its releases include the only duet studio recording of the late Portland blues women Linda Hornbuckle and Janice Scroggins, Sista, which Robb produced, and Muddyvishnu, Robb's first electric band album since his 1992 recording of Sensitive Guy.

In 2006, Robb was approached by cartoonist and friend, John Callahan, to produce an album of original compositions. Callahan, a quadriplegic since age 21, had provided the graphic logo for Psychedelta Records and was the subject of the forthcoming documentary film "Touch Me Someplace I Can Feel," which includes footage of the album's recording. Released on Bone Clone Records, Purple Winos in the Rain features Callahan on vocals, harmonica and ukulele, with guest artists Peter Boe on piano and Robb on acoustic and bottleneck guitars, and a cameo appearance by Tom Waits. In 2018, one of the album's duet recordings of Callahan and Robb, "Texas When You Go," was featured in the Hollywood biopic Don't Worry, He Won't Get Far on Foot produced by Amazon Studios.

== Style and equipment ==
Robb is a self-taught fingerpicking guitarist associated with the American Primitive Guitar style, which draws upon diverse musical influences while rooted in the blues. Known primarily as a folk-blues guitarist, he learned to play guitar by listening to blues musicians, such as Charley Patton and Mississippi John Hurt, and has developed a distinctive fingerpicking technique in which he plays the bass line, rhythm chords, and single-note leads simultaneously. In his original compositions and artistic styling, he incorporates influences from other genres, such as jazz, folk music, country music, classical and world music, often utilizing odd time measures, to personalize his music and story telling. An electric and acoustic guitarist, Robb plays Fender, Martin, National, and Weissenborn guitars.^{[22]}

== Awards ==
Terry Robb received the Muddy Award for Best Acoustic Guitar by the Cascade Blues Association for 19 consecutive years, from inception of the award category in 1992 until it was renamed in his honor in 2011. Recipients of the "Terry Robb" Muddy Award for Best Acoustic Guitar include Portland guitarists Mary Flower and Alan Hager.

Robb was inducted into the Cascade Blues Association Hall of Fame in 1998, and to the Oregon Music Hall of Fame in 2009. In 2017 he received the "Paul deLay" Muddy Award for Lifetime Achievement by the Cascade Blues Association.

== Discography ==
=== Solo ===
- 1982 Psychedelta (Outside Records)
- 1986 Next Window (artwork by John Callahan) (Tarula Records, T001)
- 1987 Nice Try (feat. John Fahey and Curtis Salgado) (Tarula Records, T002)
- 1990 Jelly Behind the Sun (feat. Ike Willis) (House Records, H1003)
- 1992 Sensitive Guy (House Records, H1004)
- 1993 Bethlehem Star (feat. Alan Hager) (OCP, 9879)
- 1994 Acoustic Blues Trio (Burnside Records, BCD-0019-2)
- 1996 Stop This World (feat. Maria Muldaur, Eddy Clearwater and Curtis Salgado) (Burnside Records, BCD-0025-2)
- 2000 Heart Made of Steel (Burnside Records, BCD-0040-2)
- 2002 When I Play My Blues Guitar (Burnside Records, 0045; Re-released in 2014 by Allegro Corp., BCD 45)
- 2005 Resting Place (Yellow Dog Records, YDR 1177)
- 2012 Muddyvishnu (artwork by John Fahey) (Psychedelta Records, PDR 021)
- 2013 Hymn (OCP, 30110377)
- 2016 Cool on the Bloom (NiaSounds)
- 2019 Confessin' My Dues (NiaSounds)

=== Curtis Salgado & Terry Robb ===
- 1997 Hit It 'n Quit It (Lucky Records, LRS-040)

=== Acoustic Guitar Summit ===
- 1998 Acoustic Guitar Summit (Accent on Music, AM-1055)
- 2000 Summit Meeting (Bay View Music, AM-2055)
- 2012 O' Christmas Three (Accent on Music, AGS-3355)

=== Compilations ===
- 1987 Rose City Blues Festival (Track 10 "Get Tough") (Po-Town Records, PT001)
- 1995 The Rounder Christmas Album: Must Be Santa! (Track 16 "The Holly and the Ivy/The Cherry Tree Carol") (Rounder, 3118; 1998 reissue Rounder Select, 1166131184)
- 2000 The Cascade Blues Association's Anniversary Hall of Fame Tribute (Track 3 "Cascade Lightnin'") (Cascade Blues, 1)
- 2001 The Cascade Blues Association Presents: The Acoustic Roots and Blues Heritage Festival (Track 8 "Depot Blues" and Track 13 "Hesitation Blues) (Cascade Blues, 2)
- 2002 American Roots Songbook (Track 8 "Cookie Dough") (St Clair, 6786)
- 2002 Portland's Best Blues (Track 10 "Enron Blues") (Raw Records, 402; Re-released in 2003 as Portland's Best Blues Collection, 406)
- 2003 Lay Down My Old Guitar: A Tribute to John Jackson (Track 6 "Don't Let Your Deal Go Down") (Centrum Recordings, C0103)
- 2003 Portland's Genuine Blues (Track 1 "Dyin' Blues" and Track 11 "Judge Boushay Blues") (Allegro Blues Records, 7001)
- 2003 Pickathon Vol. 2 (Track 7 "Sam Webb is Gone / Guitar Rag) (KBOO 90.7 FM)
- 2003 Pickathon 2002 (Track 4 "Judge Boushay Blues) (Mountain Lab Productions, 7235)
- 2005 Inspired Explorations of America's Musical Roots (Track 8 "Louise") (Yellow Dog Records)
- 2006 KMHD Presents Blues in Portland Vol. 1 (Track 7 "Madison Avenue Shuffle")
- 2006 John Fahey & Friends: Friends of Fahey Tribute (Track 8 "Fahey at Bush Park" and Track 13 "Impressions of Susan") (Slakertone Records, ST 021)
- 2012 The Revenge of Blind Joe Death: The John Fahey Tribute Album (Track 10 "John Kirby Blues") (Takoma Records, 048)
- 2012 The Portland Guitar Society Presents: Silver Jubilee (Track 2 "All Night, Morning too" and Track 9 "Tapped Out")
- 2017 Wild (Tracks 9, 10 and 11: Blues Slide 1, 2 and 3) (NiaSounds)

== Sessionography ==
- 1982 Christmas Guitar Vol. 1 by John Fahey (credited as co-producer) (Varrick Records, a re-recording of The New Possibility)
- 1983 Popular Songs of Christmas and New Year's by John Fahey (credited as a primary guitarist) (Varrick Records)
- 1984 Let Go by John Fahey (credited as record producer and guitar accompanist) (Varrick Records)
- 1985 Rain Forests, Oceans and Other Themes by John Fahey (credited as record producer and guitar accompanist) (Varrick Records)
- 1986 Christmas Guitar by John Fahey (credited as record producer) (Varrick Records)
- 1986 In the Stillness by Patrick Loomis (credited as record producer) (OCP, reissued 1991)
- 1989 God, Time and Causality by John Fahey (credited as record producer) (Shanachie)
- 1990 Aquamarine by Ron Steen (credited as record producer) (House Records)
- 1991 Curtis Salgado and the Stilettos (credited as guest guitarist) (BFE Records)
- 1992 Old Girlfriends and Other Horrible Memories by John Fahey (credited as co-producer and lead guitar on Track 12 "Twilight Time") (Varrick Records)
- 1994 The Return of the Repressed: The John Fahey Anthology (credited as guitar accompanist and arranger) (Rhino Records)
- 1994 The John Fahey Christmas Album (credited as record producer and guitar accompanist) (Burnside Records)
- 1995 More Than You Can Chew by Curtis Salgado (credited as guest guitarist) (Priority Records)
- 1997 Backwater Blues by Sheila Wilcoxson (credited as record producer and guest artist on acoustic and bottleneck guitars) (Burnside Records)
- 1998 Runnin' and Ramblin by Bill Rhoades & Alan Hager (credited as record producer and guest guitarist) (Burnside Records)
- 1999 Wiggle Outta This by Curtis Salgado (credited as guest guitarist) (Shanachie)
- 2000 The Cascade Blues Association's Anniversary Hall of Fame Tribute (credited as record producer) (Cascade Blues, 1)
- 2002 Can't Find No Heaven by Alice Stuart (credited as record producer and guest guitarist) (Burnside Records)
- 2003 Ooh Wee! by Duffy Bishop (credited as record producer) (Trillium Records)
- 2006 Purple Winos in the Rain by John Callahan (credited as record producer and guitar accompanist) (Bone Clone Records)
- 2006 No Sun Around the Blues by Adam Scramstad (credited as record producer)
- 2009 Sista by Linda Hornbuckle & Janice Scroggins (credited as record producer) (Pyschedelta Records)
- 2009 Of Ice and Men by Barbara Chamberlin (credited as guest guitarist)
- 2009 Bon Temps Rouge by The New Iberians (credited as record producer and guest guitarist) (Psychedelta Records)
- 2011 Rose City Ramble by Lauren Sheehan (credited as guest guitarist)
- 2014 Boomerang Girl by Barbara Chamberlin (credited as record producer and guitar accompanist)
- 2016 The Beautiful Lowdown by Curtis Salgado (credited as guest guitarist) (Alligator Records)
