= Cullingham =

Cullingham is a surname. Notable people with this surname include:

- James Cullingham (born 1954), Canadian documentary filmmaker
- Sidney Cullingham (1896–1983), American politician from Nebraska
