= Buffalo Records =

Record label based in Japan

Buffalo Records is a Japan-based record label that has released albums by Asylum Street Spankers, Bonerama, Mary Flower, Ruthie Foster, Charlie Hunter, Michael Powers, Slim Richey's Dream Band and more.

== Background ==
The label was founded by Doug Allsopp, a Californian who had moved to Japan in 1991. Allsopp brought West Coast bluesman Kelly Joe Phelps to Japan in 1999 and had him go on tour there. Given the fact that Japanese releases have all of the extras and more info on the release, stores there prefer them, and Japanese magazines don't review many imports, he still went with his original notion. This was his realization that the best way to introduce an album was to release it in Japan. According to the September 8, 2001 issue of Billboard, Allsopp set the label up to import alternative-country titles. The labels he was dealing with included Bloodshot, Sugar Hill, and Sci-Fidelity. He was also open to suggestion from a network of record buyers for import suggestions.

One of the albums that the label has released there was the Bridges album by Mary Flower.

It was noted in The Journal of the American Chamber of Commerce in Japan that there were two great blues labels in Japan. They were P Vine/Blues Interaction and Buffalo Records. It said that Buffalo was proving to be an aggressively adventurous label.

Allsopp has also handled booking for Rickie Lee Jones.

== History ==
The first releases for the label were Spanker Madness by the Asylum Street Spankers, Ghosts of Hallelujah and Texas Trumpets by The Gourds. Even though they didn't sell a great amount, the exercise was worthwhile.

In 2000, the label released Heartbreaker by Ryan Adams and The Hurting Business by Chuck Prophet.

As of 20001, they were importing record albums from overseas countrties and paying the royalties there.

As part of the label's 5th Anniversary "Heart of America" series, the label released the In the Land of Dreams by Austin, Texas multi-instrumentalist Stanley Smith on Buffalo Records LBCY-305. This release was the first in the series.

The Prodigal Son album by Michael Powers which was released on the Baryon label in the US in 2006 was also released in Japan on Buffalo Records BUF-136 the same year.

It was reported by The Japan Times in the October 4, 2008 issue that with CD sales dropping, Allsopp went to the annual fair of promotional goods at Tokyo's Big Sight in a bid to look for an additional venture.

Martinez Akustica, a group featuring Chilean musician, Victor Martinez Parada toured Japan in July/August 2009. This resulted in the distribution and release of their recordings through Buffalo.
