= What? And Give Up Show Biz? =

Live album by Asylum Street Spankers
- Released: September 30, 2008
- Recorded: January 10–20, 2008
- Venue: Barrow Street Theatre
- Genre: Swing music, folk rock, country music
- Label: Yellow Dog Records

Asylum Street Spankers chronology
| Mommy Says No! (2007) | What? And Give Up Show Biz? (2008) | God's Favorite Band (2009) |

What? And Give Up Show Biz? is a live double album by Austin, Texas-based band Asylum Street Spankers, which documents the band's performance of a revue of the same name at Barrow Street Theatre during a two-week period in January 2008. The album was released on September 30, 2008 on Yellow Dog Records in the United States. In his review of the revue, David Sprague of Variety wrote: "The book, built on fleshed-out codifications of the members’ road-tested stage banter, is somewhat slight, but the ratio of knee-slappers to groan-inducers is high enough to make it diverting." In the same review, he concluded, "...given the Spankers’ remarkably deft musicianship and bottomless pit of material — bad breaks and bad brakes are both likely to be part of the touring band vernacular for some time to come — the revue would seem to have legs."

Professional ratings
Review scores
| Source | Rating |
|---|---|
| AllMusic | 3.5/5 stars |
| Blurt | (favorable) |
| MSN Music (Consumer Guide) | A- |
| PopMatters | 7/10 stars |

== Track listing ==
=== Disc 1 ===
1. "Ladies and Gentlemen... I've Wasted My Life"
2. Everybody Loves My Baby
3. "Nice Theater"
4. "My Country's Calling Me"
5. Winning the War on Drugs
6. Blue Prelude
7. "It's good to be here in, uh...."
8. Why Do It Right?
9. "Stanley and Wammo"
10. Since I Met You Baby
11. "Gig from Hell"
12. Monkey Rag
13. "The Morning Moron Mob"
14. Medley of Burned Out Songs
15. Beer
16. "Strange Talents"
17. Leaf Blower
18. "The Bus Story"
19. Think About Your Troubles
20. "Daddy Drinks Because You Cry"
21. You Only Love Me For My Lunchbox

=== Disc 2 ===
1. "Y'all like love songs?"
2. My Baby in the CIA
3. "Read thinner books."
4. Asylum Street Blues
5. Breathin'
6. "bathroom break"
7. Big Noise From Winnetka
8. Hick Hop
9. Got My Mojo Workin'
10. "take a good look..."
11. My Favorite Record
12. "Encore!"
13. Blade of Grass
14. "Requests?"
15. Pakalolo Baby
16. Tight Like That
17. Wake and Bake
18. TV Party
19. "goodnight"
20. Stick Magnetic Ribbons on Your SUV

== Personnel ==
- Asylum Street Spankers – primary artist
- Brooke Barnett – graphic design
- Justin Fox Burks – photography
- Joshua Cain – stage manager
- Tom Durack – mastering
- Josh Hoag – bass
- Patrick Jacobs – audio engineer
- Charlie King – dobro, harmonica, mandolin, member of attributed artist, throat singing, vocals
- Rich Lamb – engineer, mixing
- Scott Marcus – drums, percussion, vocals
- Christina Marrs – audio production, executive producer, guitars, musical saw, producer, tenor banjo, ukulele, vocals
- Nevada Newman – guitar, mandolin, vocals
- J.P. Riedie – audio production, director, producer
- Korey Simeone – member of attributed artist, violin, vocals
- Stanley Smith – clarinet, guitar, member of attributed artist, vocals
- Wammo – audio production, executive producer, harmonica, percussion, producer, vocals, washboard, whistle
- Todd Sebastian Williams – cover photo, photography
