= The Pass System =

2015 Canadian documentary film

The Pass System is a Canadian documentary film released in 2015, focusing on the former Canadian government policy known as the pass system, which enforced the segregation of First Nations people on their reserves.

The film was extensively researched, directed, and produced by Alex Williams, with narration provided by Tantoo Cardinal. James Cullingham served as the executive producer, and Cris Derksen composed the music for the documentary.

With the support of the Canada Council for the Arts, the Ontario Arts Council, the Toronto Arts Council, and the community, the film was produced in association with Tamarack Productions. Its premiere took place in Vancouver, British Columbia, as part of the 2015 Vancouver International Film Festival.

The Pass System initially aired on the Aboriginal Peoples Television Network on April 13, 2016. Subsequently, it was broadcast by the Canadian Broadcasting Corporation's main network on June 19, 2016, at 1 p.m.
