= Janice Scroggins =

American jazz pianist (1955–2014)

- Born: July 17, 1955; Idabel, Oklahoma, U.S.
- Died: May 27, 2014 (aged 58) Portland, Oregon, U.S.
- Genres: Blues, gospel, jazz
- Instrument: Piano

Janice Scroggins (July 17, 1955 – May 27, 2014) was a jazz pianist and instructor in Portland, Oregon.

== Early life ==
Scroggins was born in 1955 in Idabel, Oklahoma, to Henry and Mary Scroggins. Scroggins first began playing the piano at the age of three. Her mother and grandmother, who were church pianists and organists, were among her first music instructors. She attended high school and college in Oakland, California, and moved to the Albina community of Portland in 1978 along with her infant daughter, Arietta Ward.

== Musical career ==
Scroggins performed with Portland area musicians including Linda Hornbuckle, Thara Memory, Curtis Salgado, Mel Brown and was featured regularly with New Orleans saxophonist Reggie Houston. She also played with the Norman Sylvester Blues Band and was a session musician for several other artists.

Scroggins was the music director for the Portland Interfaith Gospel Choir. She directed the musical component of the World Arts Foundation's annual tribute to Martin Luther King Jr. for 29 years. Scroggins was also a piano teacher in the Portland Public School system and at Portland Community College.

In 1987, Scroggins published the album Janice Scroggins Plays Scott Joplin. The album was nominated for a Grammy Award in 1988. She published her second major album, Piano Love, in 2013. She also performed at the Portland Jazz Festival in March 2013.

Her music was influenced by gospel, or church music, as well as African rhythms and country. Oregon Arts Watch writer Bob Hicks described her music as having "a little bit of Oklahoma and a little bit of Oakland and a little bit of gospel and a whole river of American musical history in it".

== Family ==
Scroggins had three children; Arietta Ward, Nafisaria Scroggins, and Francis Scroggins. At the time of her death, she had three grandchildren.

== Death ==
Scroggins died of a heart attack on May 27, 2014, shortly after playing piano for a Portland Community College class. She died at the Sylvania campus. Scroggins was 58 years old at the time.

== Tributes ==
In 1992, Scroggins was inducted into the Cascade Blues Association Hall of Fame. She was inducted into the Oregon Music Hall of Fame in 2013.

On August 9, 2014, Scroggins was honored with a free festival by Portland blues artists Norman Sylvester, the Linda Hornbuckle Band, the Strange Tones, and others.

== Discography ==
- Janice Scroggins Plays Scott Joplin, Flying Heart Records (1987)
- Piano Love, MAH Records (2014)
