= Philip Paul (drummer) =

American studio drummer (1925–2022)

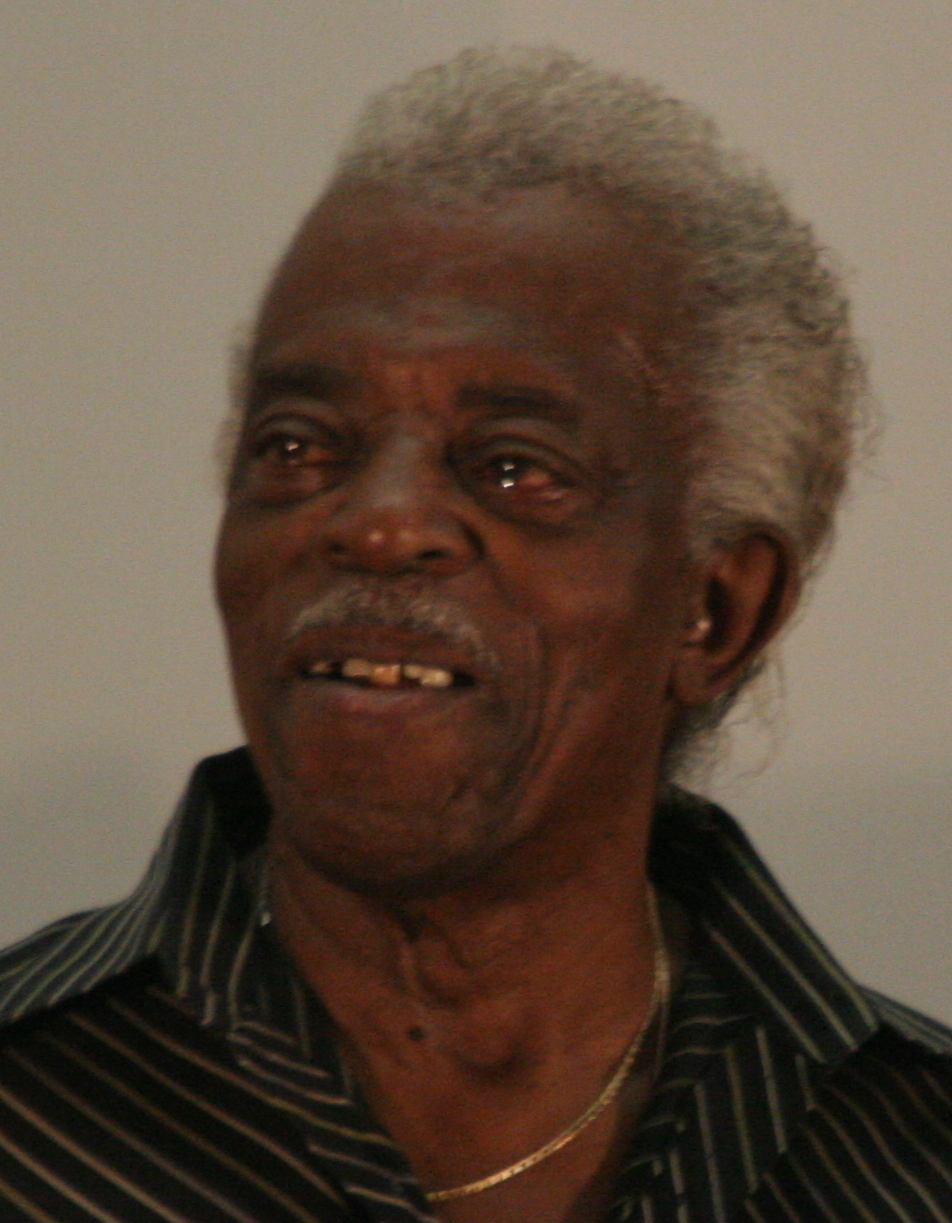
- Paul in 2010

Background information
- Born: August 11, 1925; Harlem, New York, U.S.
- Died: January 30, 2022 (aged 96) Cincinnati, Ohio, U.S.
- Genres: Jazz
- Occupation: Studio musician
- Instrument: Drums
- Years active: 1938–2022
- Label: King Records

Philip Paul (August 11, 1925 – January 30, 2022) was an American studio drummer from Cincinnati, Ohio.

In 2009, he was honored at the Rock and Roll Hall of Fame and Museum in Cleveland, as part of their "From Songwriters to Soundmen: The People Behind the Hits". Also in 2009, Paul was honored with the Ohio Heritage Fellowship, Ohio's highest honor for traditional artists. In 2002, he was honored by the Cincinnati Enquirer with a Lifetime CAMMY Award for his contributions to the music and culture of the city.

== Early life ==
Paul was born in Harlem, New York, on August 11, 1925. He was raised in Manhattan and learned to play the drums when he was nine years old. His father, Philip Paul, Sr. arrived in the U.S. from St. Croix with his brothers, Fred and John. They worked construction during the day and performed in their own Afro-Caribbean jazz band at night. Paul Jr. became mesmerized by the drums played by his uncle, John. When Paul was nine years old, his father bought him a drum set, along with lessons. By the time he was 13 years old, he began playing with his father's band.

== Professional background ==
Paul was just out of his teens when he began playing at the Savoy Ballroom in Harlem with various musicians including Arthur Prysock, Buddy Johnson's Big Band, Sonny Stitt, Bud Powell, and Dizzy Gillespie.

In 1951, he was playing with Buddy Johnson one night, when Tiny Bradshaw heard him play and invited him to move to Cincinnati and join his band. Johnson's band played at the Cotton Club in Newport, Kentucky, just across the river from Cincinnati. The club was considered the premier nightspot for the black community. While Paul and his parents were initially opposed to leaving New York, Paul accepted the offer and moved to Cincinnati. From 1951 to 1964, he was often called on as the "go to" studio drummer for bands playing at the club.

It was while working with Bradshaw that Paul met his future wife, Juanita Snyder, who was a Cotton Club dancer and close friends with one of the band members. They were married in 1952. Paul has stated that while he preferred living in New York, his marriage to Juanita removed any intent to move back to New York. "The only thing that kept me here was Juanita. If it wasn't for meeting her, I probably would have left."

Soon after arriving in Cincinnati, Paul met Syd Nathan, president and owner of King Records. From 1952 to 1964, Paul became the studio drummer for King Records, as well as two of its subsidiary labels, Federal and Bethlehem. He played drums on over 350 recordings with artists such as Tiny Bradshaw, Hank Ballard, Freddie King, Little Willie John, Wynonie Harris, Bull Moose Jackson, and Hawkshaw Hawkins.

Paul played drums on an early Hank Ballard hit, "Sexy Ways", along with R&B/pop chart hits "Finger Poppin' Time" and "Let's Go, Let's Go, Let's Go" with Hank Ballard and The Midnighters. He was also on the original recordings of Little Willie John's "I'm Shakin'", Charles Brown's "Please Come Home for Christmas", Tiny Bradshaw's "Soft", and nearly every Freddie King record, including his biggest hits "Hide Away" and "Tore Down".

"If someone were to try to isolate the single heartbeat of the early days of rock and roll, as it transitions from 'race music' to 'rhythm & blues' to whatever you want to call what early rock and roll is, that heartbeat is Philip. (He is) the thread that runs through so much of the important music of that period." — Terry Stewart, President of the Rock and Roll Hall of Fame and Museum

He was also in the Roy Meriwether Trio, when they recorded their classic "Popcorn and Soul". He recorded two albums with the Meriwether Trio on the Columbia Records label. He also toured the U.S. and Canada with Jimmy Smith, Nat Adderley, Herbie Mann, and George Wein's Newport Jazz All-Stars.

After leaving King, Paul joined the Woody Evans Trio, performing for 25 years at local country clubs, including Cincinnati's Playboy Club and the Beverly Hills Supper Club. During this time, he and his wife Juanita and bassist Ed Conley also toured the country together, performing as the rhythm section with Juanita singing for jazz stars in cities all over the United States.

In 2003, Paul released his own CD It's About Time under the Stork Music Productions label. The recording featured Peter Frampton, Kenny Poole, and Marcos Sastre on guitar; Steve Schmidt, Roland Ashby, and Sam Jackson on keyboards; and Ed Conley and Mike Scharf on bass. That same year, Paul served as the drummer on Big Joe Duskin's final album, Big Joe Jumps Again!, which was nominated for the W. C. Handy Blues Award Comeback CD of the Year. The award is considered the most prestigious honor for blues artists.

== Personal life and death ==
In later life, Paul lived in the Evanston neighborhood of Cincinnati with his wife, Juanita and stepdaughter, Ramona. He continued to perform on the weekends at The Cincinnatian Hotel.

He died from COVID-19 in Cincinnati on January 30, 2022, at the age of 96.

== Honors and awards ==
In 2002, Paul was honored by the Cincinnati Enquirer with a Lifetime CAMMY Award for his contributions to the music and culture of the city.

In 2009, Paul and his wife, Juanita were honored at the Rock and Roll Hall of Fame and Museum in Cleveland, as part of their "From Songwriters to Soundmen: The People Behind the Hits". The presentation included a retrospective of his recording background at King Records, his nationwide tours, and his 50 year career as a studio drummer in the Cincinnati nightclubs.

In July 2009, he was honored with the Ohio Heritage Fellowship. The Fellowship was presented during the CityFolk Festival in Dayton. The summer-long festival was a statewide celebration of his lifetime of work in the music industry. The Ohio Heritage Fellowship is Ohio's highest honor bestowed on traditional artists on behalf of the city of Cincinnati.
