= Cris Derksen =

Canadian Cree cellist and composer (1981–2026)

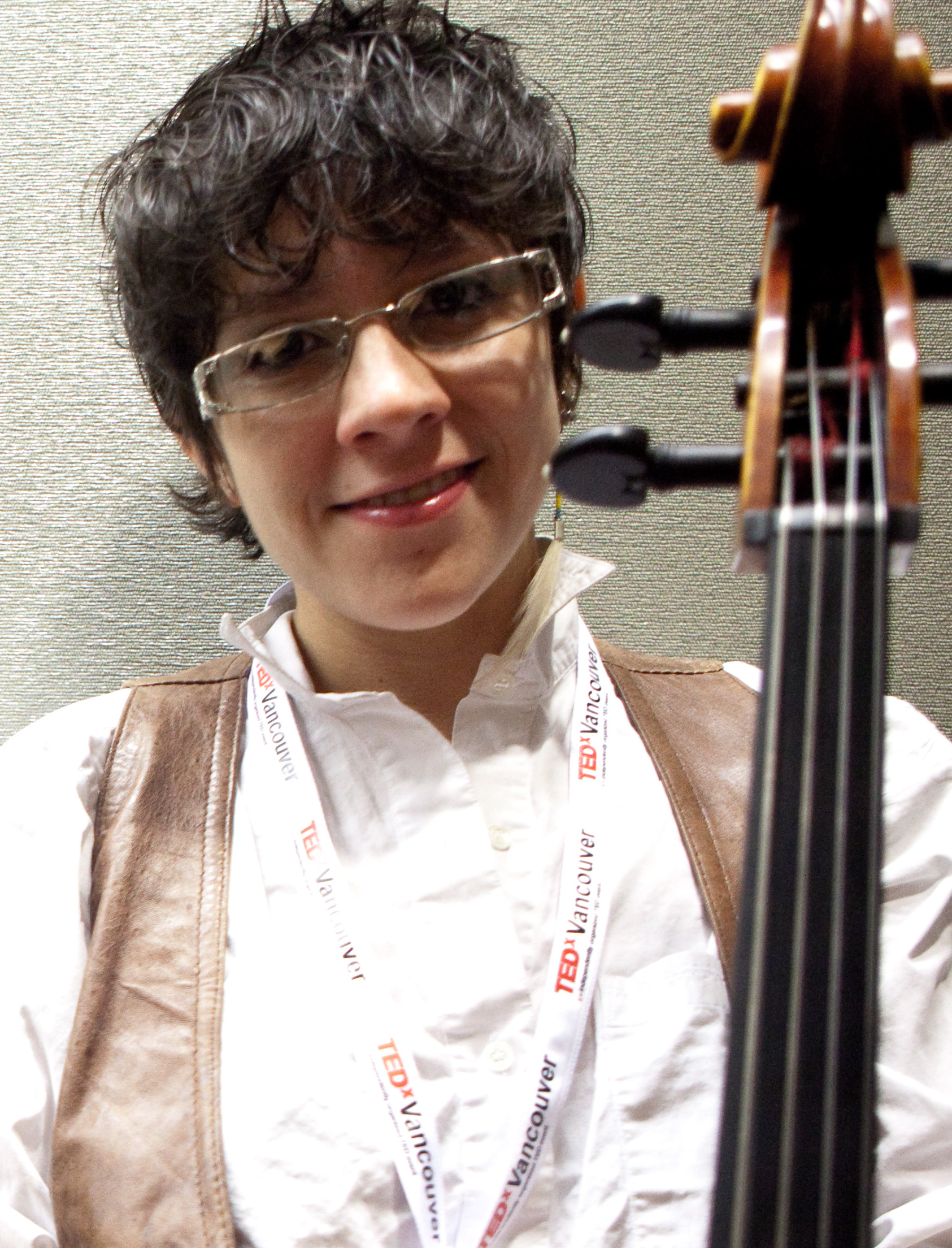
- Derksen in 2009
- Born: Crystal Dawn Derksen; April 20, 1981; Slave Lake, Alberta, Canada
- Died: May 15, 2026 (aged 45) near Athabasca County, Alberta, Canada
- Education: University of British Columbia
- Occupations: Cellist; composer
- Website: Official website

Crystal Dawn Derksen (April 20, 1981 – May 15, 2026) was a Canadian Cree two-spirit cellist and composer from Northern Alberta. Nominated for a Juno Award, Derksen was known for her (Note: While it was widely reported that Derksen used she/they pronouns, her obituary on The Globe and Mail stated that Derksen used she/her pronouns but "didn’t mind" being referred to as they. This article will use she/her pronouns for consistency.) unique musical sound which blends classical music with traditional Indigenous music. Her music is often described as "electronic cello" or classical traditional fusion.

== Background ==
Crystal Dawn Derksen was born in Slave Lake on April 20, 1981. She hailed from the North Tallcree reserve in Northern Alberta and had dual Cree and Mennonite heritage. She attended Victoria School for the Performing Arts in Edmonton and was trained in classical music from an early age. She received a Bachelor of Music in Cello Performance at the University of British Columbia. During her time at UBC, she held the position of Principal Cellist with the UBC Symphony Orchestra.

Derksen was killed in a traffic collision near Township Road 684 on Highway 44 in Northern Alberta on May 15, 2026. She was 45.

== Career ==
In 2009, Derksen was the curator in residence at the Vancouver East Cultural Centre. She traveled and performed internationally in numerous countries including: Germany, France, Spain, Norway, Czech Republic, Mexico, Sweden, and the United States. She performed with the Beat Nation Live Collective, Kanye West, Kinnie Starr, Tanya Tagaq, Rae Spoon, and traditional powwow groups.

In 2015, the Orchestral Powwow Project album of Derksen was produced in partnership with the independent record label Tribal Spirit Powwow. During the making of this album, Derksen utilized Tribal Spirit's library of powwow music as a resource and incorporated some of the traditional music found in this library in her project. Also in 2015, Derksen was mentored by American musician Buffy Sainte-Marie as part of an Ontario Arts Council grant.

In 2017, Derksen performed at the Annual Public Meeting of the Canada Council for the Arts with the Cris Derksen Trio which consisted of Derksen, drummer Jesse Baird and dancer Nimkii Osawamick.

In 2019, the Art Gallery of Ontario commissioned Derksen to create a new choral work inspired by the Early Rubens exhibition at the Art Gallery of Ontario. Also in 2019, Derksen composed Maada’ookii Songlines, a choral work featuring 200 singers as part of the Luminato festival. Alongside Christine Tootoo and Jamie Griffiths, Derksen was part of a 2019 performance piece called Ikummagialiit, that was commissioned by the National Gallery of Canada as part of the Àbadakone exhibition on Indigenous art.

In 2020, Derksen performed as part of CBC Gem's Queer Pride Inside special.

== Musical releases ==
- The Cusp (2010)
- The Collapse (May 2013)
- Orchestral Powwow Project (2015)
- The Visit (2025)

== Composer credits ==
- People of a Feather (feature film, 2011)
- TransMigration (Kaha:wi Dance Company, 2012)
- 8th Fire soundtrack (CBC Television mini-series, 2012)
- Sound design for two plays for the Weesageechak Festival of the Native Earth Performing Arts (2014)
- Treading Water, documentary, Wookey Films (2014)
- The Pass System (2015)
- Taken, TV series introduction (2016)
- Re-Quickening, Kaha:wi Dance Company (2016)
- Rise, Viceland series (2017)
- Kiinalik: These Sharp Tools with Evalyn Parry (2017)
- Kamloopa (2018)
- Maada’ookii Songlines (2019)
- Rebellion, commissioned by the Thunder Bay Symphony Orchestra.
- British Columbia: An Untold History (documentary series, 2021)
- The Well (feature film, 2025)

== Awards ==
- Together with Evalyn Parry for Kiinalik: These Sharp Tools, Outstanding Sound Design/Composition, General Theatre Division, Dora Mavor Moore Award (2018)
- Indigenous Music Awards Nominee (2017)
- Juno Award Nominee, Instrumental Album of the Year (2016)
- First Tracks funding (2012)
- Aboriginal Peoples Choice Music Award nominee for best new artist and best instrumental album (2011)
- Canadian Aboriginal Music Award for Instrumental Album of the Year (2011)
- Western Canadian Music Award Nominee (2011)
- Aboriginal Peoples Television Network rising star (2009)

== See also ==
- Indigenous Canadian personalities
