= Asylum Street Spankers =

American blues and roots rock band (1994–2011)

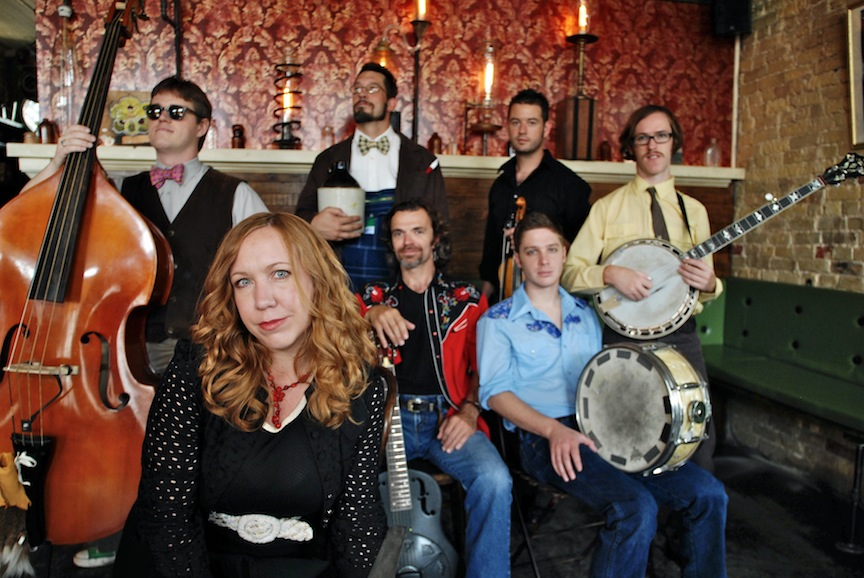
- 2010 press photo

Background information
- Origin: Austin, Texas, U.S.
- Genres: Blues, folk, roots rock, comedy
- Years active: 1994–2011
- Labels: Watermelon, Yellow Dog, Spanks-a-Lot, Buffalo
- Members: (for final 2011 tour): Christina Marrs; Nevada Newman; Mark Henne; Morgan Patrick Thompson; Shawn Dean; Charlie King; Trevor Smith; Thrad Lee
- Website: www.asylumstreetspankers.bandcamp.com

The Asylum Street Spankers were an American acoustic blues and roots rock band from Austin, Texas, United States. The band played cover versions of early jazz and comical, often risqué original songs.

In 2006, the band's satirical antiwar video "Stick Magnetic Ribbons on Your SUV" surpassed 1 million views in two months on YouTube. In January 2011 the band won the 10th Annual Independent Music Awards in the Gospel category for God's Favorite Band. The band dissolved after a final tour in spring 2011.

== History ==
=== Founding ===
The band was founded by Christina Marrs, William David "Wammo" Walker, and Guy Forsyth after a party at the Dabbs Hotel near the Llano River in Texas in 1994. The band began by busking on the streets of Austin and playing for tips in bars. In their earliest days, the Spankers' repertoire consisted almost entirely of country, blues, jazz, swing, and Tin Pan Alley songs from the 1890s to the 1950s, with an emphasis on the 1920s and 1930s. The band developed a raucous and irreverent sound, focusing on musicianship and theatricality. Several early members were actors and nearly all members have been multi-instrumentalists. Until 2004 they played most of their concerts without amplification.

The band derived its name from Austin's Guadalupe Street, where they would often busk and where they played early shows. At one time Guadalupe Street was nicknamed "Asylum Street" because it led to a state psychiatric hospital. According to Christina Marrs, "'spanking' is an old jazz term for playing your instrument vigorously. But we still like the other connotation of spanking as well."

In February 1996, the Asylum Street Spankers appeared at Esther's Pool on a Monks' Night Out show attended by scouts from Disney/Touchstone Features seeking improvisational comedy talent for television projects. The Austin Chronicle described the Spankers as the bill's "distinctly non-improv" act.

=== Lineup changes, studio albums ===
With the departure of Guy Forsyth in 1997 the Spankers began playing their own songs, most of them in the roots styles the band was familiar with. By 1999 only Marrs and Wammo remained of the original line-up.

Reconstructing the band, Marrs and Wammo began including more cross-genre experimentation, intricate arrangements, vocal harmonies, and humorous songs, sometimes with pointed social and cultural commentary. Also in 1999, Marrs and Wammo founded Spanks-a-Lot Records to release their music.

In 2006, the satirical antiwar video "Stick Magnetic Ribbons on Your SUV" received 1,054,743 views on YouTube. The video was directed by Morgan Higby Night.

In January 2008 the group premiered its stage show What? And Give Up Show Biz? off-Broadway at the Barrow Street Theatre. In January 2011, Asylum Street Spankers won the 10th Annual Independent Music Awards in the Gospel category for God's Favorite Band.

=== Breakup, farewell tour ===
After the band broke up in 2010, the remaining members announced one last tour, nine months in 50 cities: "Spanks for the Memories! The Farewell Tour." Down to one founding member, the band built a new show around Marrs, Newman, and returning member Charlie King. The "Spanks for Everything" Farewell Tour concluded with a series of final shows in Austin on April 20–23, 2011.

In March 2011, the band raised over $20,000 from fans in order to create a DVD retrospective and documentary centered on their final performances in Austin.

In April 2014, an album with previous unreleased recordings of their last shows, The Last Laugh, was released. In 2015, The Last Laugh won the award for the "Live Performance Album" category at The 14th Annual Independent Music Awards.

== Style ==
Spanker Madness is an album of country blues songs that praise marijuana use and criticize the war on drugs, though other songs look at the negative side of recreational drugs. Mercurial was recorded using technology from the 1940s. My Favorite Record is about their love of music. Mommy Says No! is an album of songs about children and childhood that was inspired by children's authors Shel Silverstein and Maurice Sendak.

The Spankers have covered songs by Prince, Tom Waits, Bob Dylan, Beastie Boys, The B-52's, Black Flag, Louis Armstrong, Bessie Smith, Harry Nilsson, The Jazz Butcher, The Violent Femmes, George Jones, Nirvana, Nina Simone, Nine Inch Nails, Oingo Boingo, Otis Redding, Screamin' Jay Hawkins, and Johnny Cash.

== People ==
=== Final band members (2011 tour) ===
- Christina Marrs
- Charlie King
- Nevada Newman
- Mark Henne
- Morgan Patrick Thompson
- Shawn Dean (The Unknown Wrestler)
- Trevor Smith
- Thrad Lee

=== Former members ===
- "Colonel" Josh Arnson
- Greg "Pops" Bayless
- Dave "Leroy" Biller
- Adam "Tiny" Booker
- Jakob Breitbach
- Garreth Broesche
- Cade Callahan
- Justin "Sick" Carr
- Jimmie Dean
- "Mysterious" John Dodson
- Jonathan Doyle
- Jake Erwin
- Guy Forsyth
- Olivier Giraud
- Reese Gray
- Westen Borghesi
- Mike Henry
- Josh Hoag
- Billy Horton
- Scott Marcus
- Brent Martens
- Eamon McLaughlin
- Django Porter
- Charlie Rose
- "Salty" John Salmon
- Paul Schlichting
- PB Shane
- Korey Simeone
- Kevin Smith
- Stanley Smith
- John Thomasson
- William David "Wammo" Walker
- Matt Weiner
- Jeffrey Ross

== Discography ==
=== Albums ===
- Spanks for the Memories (1996)
- Live (1997, out of print)
- Nasty Novelties (EP, 1997)
- Hot Lunch (1999)
- Spanker Madness (2001)
- A Christmas Spanking (2001)
- Dirty Ditties (EP, 2002)
- "Stinkin'" b/w "Goodbye Cousin Early" (single, 2002)
- My Favorite Record (2002)
- Strawberry (Live) (2003, recorded 1998)
- Mercurial (2004)
- Pussycat (2005)
- Mommy Says No! (2007)
- What? And Give Up Show Biz? (two-disc live set, 2008)
- God's Favorite Band (2009)
- The Last Laugh (2014)

Solo albums by members

- Why Do it Right? (Nevada Newman)
- Lowriders On the Storm (Wammo)
- In the Land of Dreams (Stanley Smith)
- Fat Headed Stranger (Wammo)
- Faster Than the Speed of Suck (Wammo)

=== Videos ===
- Sideshow Fez (DVD)
- Re-Assembly (2005) (DVD)
- Stick Magnetic Ribbons on Your SUV

== See also ==
- Music of Austin
