= Cassie Taylor =

American singer-songwriter (born 1986)

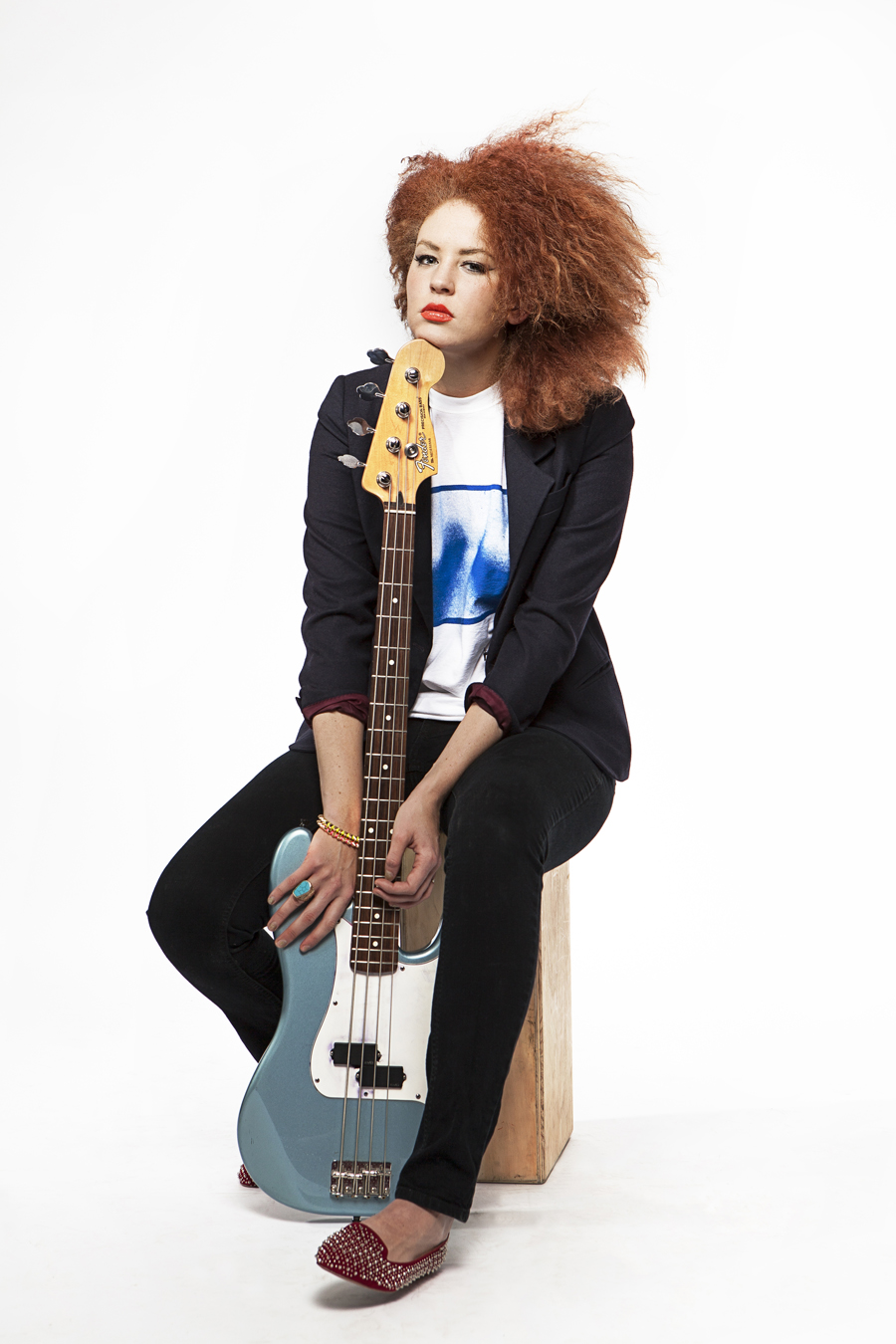

Background information
- Born: 1986 (age 39–40)
- Origin: Boulder, Colorado, United States
- Genres: Blues, jazz, electronica, indie rock, psychedelia, trance-blues, R&B
- Occupations: Singer-songwriter, musician, producer, model, fashion designer
- Instruments: Electric bass, vocals, piano, theremin, hammond organ
- Years active: 2002–present
- Label: Yellow Dog Records

Cassie Taylor (born 1986 in Boulder, Colorado) is an American singer-songwriter and blues musician. She (Note: Taylor uses she/her and they/them pronouns. This article uses both sets of pronouns interchangeably.) started her career in the early 2000s touring as a bassist for her father Otis Taylor, a trance blues musician. Taylor released a positively received solo album, Out of my Mind, in 2013, which infused traditional Delta blues with genres as diverse as electronica, indie rock, and psychedelia. Based in Kansas City, Missouri as of 2013, they are also a model and fashion designer.

== Early life, career ==
Cassie Taylor was born in 1986 in Boulder, Colorado, where they were raised by her parents Carol Ellen Bjork and blues musician Otis Taylor. They have one younger sister. Despite being born during a period when her father was on hiatus from the music industry, he did expose her to blues music and teach her piano when she was young. She only became aware of his previous career around age 8 or 9. At around age 12, Taylor began playing electric bass, impressing her father with a rendition of "Hey Joe."

When Taylor was 16, their father asked them to tour as the bassist in his band. Since his usual bassist Kenny Passarelli had a conflicting schedule, she joined his summer tour, playing for twenty dollars per gig. According to Taylor, her father didn't build her up as a prodigy, but rather "I think I was just cheap child labor. Plus, he knew I wasn’t going to get drunk on the road or go missing. Some people have the fear of God in them. I had the fear of Otis."

She toured multiple countries with the band, picking up vocals and keyboards as well and went on to appear in eight of his albums, including lending bass and vocals to his 2007 album Definition of a Circle. Taylor was also on the board of directors for the Blues Foundation.

== Fashion, modeling ==
By 2009, Taylor quit the band to work on her own demo recordings. Frustrated with the process, she moved to Memphis with her then-boyfriend and stepped back from music. They began working in retail, started studying fashion design, and began a modeling career. She later started her own company, Moorhead Apparel, with a focus on men's clothing. Taylor has made appearances in a number of studio and student films. They now also work as a photographer and videographer.

In June 2023, Taylor met drag queen Trixie Mattel backstage during a performance of Mattel's in Kansas City. After Taylor posted photos with Mattel in a Playboy jacket on Instagram, they were scouted by Playboy and became a Playboy Bunny for Playboy's online platform, Centerfold.

== Later music career ==
Taylor rededicated herself to music in 2010, beginning to work on her debut solo album, Blue, where she wrote all the tracks. Released in 2011, The New Yorker called it a "solid collection of original songs, with occasional nods to her father's trance blues."

During this time she formed the trio Girls With Guitars with musicians Dani Wilde and Samantha Fish. They released an eponymous album in 2011, afterwards beginning to tour. While she mostly writes her own material, Taylor has also reworked songs by artists as diverse as Nine Inch Nails and Muddy Waters.

== Out of my Mind (2013) ==
By 2012, Taylor had moved to Kansas City, Missouri and started mixing tracks for her second album. Originally financed through the proceeds of her husband selling his car, she was signed by Yellow Dog Records during the production process. Most of the recording took place at Immersive Studios in Boulder, where she had previously worked.

Taylor wrote, arranged, produced, and sang all tracks, also providing bass guitar, piano, Hammond organ, and theremin. The band she formed for the album and live performances includes Larry Thompson on drums and Steve Mignano on guitar, as well as Jon Gray on trumpet. The 12-track album, Out of my Mind, was released on May 7, 2013.

=== Music video ===
A music video for the first track, "That's My Man," was shot in Memphis early in 2013. About the video, which she dedicated to friends in the modeling industry who were LGBTQ, "In the video there are four different 'males.' There are the muscle cars, which represent the personification of the traditional male, a man, a transgendered [sic] (female to male), and a drag queen. All of them represent different forms of male, whether it be mental, physical or spiritual."

=== Reception ===
Reviews were positive, earning sound comparisons to Diana Ross and the Supremes, Janis Joplin, and Gladys Knight, with one review calling the album a "mesmerizing, nuanced, and imaginatively arranged collection of blues-inflected originals." Also, "Her writing is both intelligent and moving, with exceptionally strong melodies and challenging rhythms, and her production is vivid and adventuresome." "Taylor’s original compositions here all have to do with heartbreak, but she expresses her pain so exquisitely that it’s a pleasure for the listener to bear." About her vocals, Premier Guitar wrote "Taylor floats through her melodies with a relaxed, sassy vibe and none of the melismatic tinsel that plagues many contemporary female singers."

== Style ==
Out of my Mind merges traditional Delta blues with electronica, indie rock, psychedelia, and other modern genres. According to Taylor, "I use a lot of different influences ...from West African psychedelic rock, to classic rock, to industrial metal." About combining genres, "For me, the blues is the root of all American music, and I love each individual genre of American music. It would be dishonest to not use all of the things that I’ve been exposed to because I love them so much."

== Personal life ==
Taylor was married to Chuck Haren in late 2012 until their divorce in June 2023. Taylor came out as bisexual and ambiamorous in June 2022.

== Discography ==
=== Solo albums ===
- 2011: Blue
- 2011: Girls With Guitars
- 2013: Out of my Mind (Yellow Dog Records)

=== Singles ===
- 2013: "That's My Man" (Yellow Dog Records)
- 2023: "DESIRE"
