= Michael Powers (blues musician) =

- Born: Michael Murchison; February 7, 1952 (age 74); Bayonne, New Jersey, United States
- Genres: Blues, rock
- Occupation: Musician
- Instruments: Guitar, vocals
- Years active: 1960s–present
- Labels: Baryon Records, Zoho Roots, Buffalo Records
- Member of: The Ad-Libs, Moonbeam, Michael Powers and the Powder Keg

Michael Powers (born February 7, 1952) is an American blues guitarist and singer who has a varied style. He has fronted various bands since the late 1960s and has released albums from the late 1990s until the 2010s. He has been nominated for several blues and Grammy awards.

== Background ==
Michael Powers was born in Bayonne, New Jersey on February 7, 1952, to parents James and Doris Murchison. He grew up in New Jersey. His father who was a merchant seaman was away most of the time. His mother also had polio.

As a boy, while watching television Powers would use a broom to play along with music performances. His mother later bought him a guitar with trading stamps. He got early help from a man called Frank Delio who was from his congregation who taught him how to tune the guitar. Years later, Powers recalled that he was an amazing guitar player and teacher.

In the early part of Powers' career, he had his own band while still in high school. Later, he was a member of the group, The Ad Libs who had the hit, "The Boy from New York City".

For some years, Powers was a member of the group Moonbeam who had opened for artists such as Bo Diddley.

Powers' guitar playing was described by The Guardian as "understated" and "free of the more furious embellishments of so many would-be blues rockers". Frank Matheis of Acoustic Roots & Country Blues said that Powers was the only guitarist that truly reminded him of Jimi Hendrix.

At some stage Powers lost his leg due to diabetes.

According to ArtsWestchester, Powers is a 7-time Blues Music Award & Grammy Nominee.

== Career ==
=== 1960s to 1990s ===
In the 1990s, Powers was leading a group called Michael Powers and the Powder Keg. In June 1991 the group was playing venues such as the Abilene Cafe at 73 Eighth Avenue, New York. In February 1995 they were appearing at the Terra Blues club. They released the album Power Stomp in 1998. The songs included "Let the Good Times Roll", " Smokestack Lightnin'", "Dust My Broom" and "Killing Floor". Besides Powers on guitar and vocals, the group included Marco Petrilli on bass and Luigi Franconi on drums.

=== 2000s to 2010s ===
Onyx Root

His album Onyx Root was released in 2004. It was reviewed by Frank Matheis of Acoustic Roots & Country Blues. Matheis said that it was a masterpiece. The following year, it was given four stars and received a positive review by Robin Denselow of The Guardian. The album also got Powers a nomination in the Blues Foundation Best New Artist Debut category.

Prodigal Son

In 2006, Powers released his Prodigal Son album. In addition to his six original compositions, he covered material by Sonny Boy Williamson, Bob Dylan, Jimmy Reed, Rev. Gary Davis, Arthur Lee and Tiny Bradshaw. It was reviewed by Jim Santella of All About Jazz who gave the album three stars, and said "For the most part, Powers rocks hard with electric guitar and plenty of action". It was reviewed by Lahoradel Blues in 2007 with the reviewer saying, "You can’t deny it’s a splendid record" and that he showed "talent, passion and knowledge in every song he plays". The examples given were, "Goin’ Down", "White Lightning", "Wild Side", "Compassion" and "Prodigal Son". It was also received a positive review by David Barnard of Exclaim Magazine. Powers covered the song "Signed D. C." which was written by Arthur Lee. Barnard pointed out the dilemma of both Powers and Lee having to find acceptance as a rock musician. He finished off by saying that the album was Diverse and original and that it deserved to be heard beyond the blues ghetto.

Further activities

In May, 2007, Powers appeared on the DCC museum "Delta Sounds" radio program on KFFA-AM. It was hosted by Sonny Payne and Terry Buckalew. He also gave a free concert which was held in the afternoon at the Cherry Street Pavilion.

It was reported by Domenic Forcella in the July 19, 2007 issue of The Register Citizen that Powers and Connecticut act Ryan Hartt and the Blue Hearts were appearing at McCook's Park for the East Lime Day celebration on Saturday July 21.

In 2011, he had his Revolutionary Boogie album released on Zoho Roots ZM 201109.

Powers was one of the headline acts booked to appear at the Front St. Jazz & Blues Walk which was held in Lahaina on April 5 and 6, 2013.

Powers played and sang on the Two Rivers Back album by The B. Christopher Band which was released on Guitar One Records in 2019. The album was reviewed by Steve Jones of Blues Blast magazine. With one of the two songs that Powers performed on, Jones said " Powers stings like a bee on his solo and then reprises as he takes the tune home".

=== 2020s ===
Powers with his Blues Heritage Band was booked to appear at the New Rochelle Public Library in New York on Friday, October 13, 2023, at 7:00 pm.

Leading his band, the Blues Heritage Band which comprised Charlie Torres on bass, Michael Fox on drums, and Tommy Mandel on piano, they were booked to appear at the New Rochelle Public Library in New Rochelle, New York on Friday, April 12, 2024, at 7:00pm.

== Discography ==
Albums
Act	Title	Label	Catalogue	Year	Notes #
Michael Powers and the Powder Keg	Power Stomp	Lightning Rod		1998	
Michael Powers	Onyx Root	Baryon Records	BYN002	2004	
Michael Powers	Prodigal Son	Baryon Records	BYN 005	2007	
Michael Powers	Revolutionary Boogie	Zoho Roots	ZM 201109	2011	
The Michael Powers Frequency Band AKA Michael Powers & Frequency	Pumping Hot Latin Blues Live	Comic Talent	888295214834	2015	

Compilation albums
Act	Title	Label	Catalogue	Year	Notes #
Michael Powers	Bluesiana Breeze 3 Decades			2011	
