= Onyx Root =

Studio album by Michael Powers
- Released: 2004
- Genre: Blues
- Label: Baryon BYN002
- Producer: Steve Rosenthal

Michael Powers chronology
Onyx Root (2004)	Prodigal Son (2006)

Onyx Root is a 2004 album by American blues musician Michael Powers.

== Background ==
The album was released on Baryon BYN002 on August 10, 2004. It was produced by Steve Rosenthal. It got Powers a nomination in the Blues Foundation Best New Artist Debut category, as well as a nomination in the Contemporary Blues Album of the Year category.

The album reached no. 4 in the Blues section of the Mojo albums of 2005.

== Reception ==
The album was reviewed by Frank Matheis of Acoustic Roots & Country Blues. Matheis said that it was a masterpiece. John Metzger of The Music Box reviewed the album which was published in March 2005. He gave it three and a half stars. He noted the diversity of styles on the album. He also said "Powers dabbles in a little bit of everything, and each is delivered with absolute perfection."

The album was given four stars and received a positive review in late 2005 by Robin Denselow of The Guardian. The Vintage Guitar magazine review by Dan Forte was published in May 2006. Forte noted that Powers doesn't approach the blues in a purist way and that he injects some life into the party. He mentioned how Powers can go through the various songs (that are of different genres) and make "everything cohabitate in a way that makes perfect sense". It was reviewed by OC of Disques du "Moi" and he said "C’est l’album de blues parfait que j’ai jamais entendu, et certainement un classique moderne."

== Track listing ==
1. "Successful Son" (Michael Murchison)
2. "Can't Quit You Baby" (Willie Dixon)
3. "Baby's Got a Train" (Howling Wolf)
4. "She's About a Mover" (Sir Douglas)
5. "Shock" (Michael Murchison, Michael Rachinsky)
6. "Country Boy" (Muddy Waters, lyrics Michael Murchison)
7. "Bird On a Wire" (Leonard Cohen)
8. "Psychotic Reaction" (Count Five)
9. "Night in Madrid" (Michael Murchison, Luigi Franconi)
10. "Another Man Done" (Vera Hall)
11. "Graffiti" (Michael Murchison, Michael Rachinsky)
12. "All Over Town" (Michael Murchison)
13. "Shimmy Up" (Michael Murchison, Steve Jordan)
