= Big Joe Duskin =

American pianist, singer and songwriter

- Born: Joseph L. Duskin; February 10, 1921; Collegeville, Birmingham, Alabama, U.S.
- Died: May 6, 2007 (aged 86) Avondale, Ohio
- Genres: Blues, boogie-woogie
- Occupations: Pianist, singer, songwriter
- Instruments: Piano, vocals
- Years active: Early 1970s–2007
- Labels: Arhoolie, Virgin, Yellow Dog, (Mirage Independent), (Wolf), (Indigo), (Special Delivery), (Cottage On The Hill Records)

Joseph L. "Big Joe" Duskin (February 10, 1921 – May 6, 2007) was an American blues and boogie-woogie pianist. He is best known for his debut album, Cincinnati Stomp (1978), and the tracks "Well, Well Baby" and "I Met a Girl Named Martha".

== Biography ==
He was born Joseph L. Duskin in Birmingham, Alabama. By the age of seven he had started playing the piano. He played in church, accompanying his father, the Rev. Perry Duskin. His family moved to Cincinnati, Ohio, and Duskin was raised near the Union Terminal train station, where his father worked. On the local radio station WLW, Duskin heard his hero Fats Waller play. He was also inspired to play in a boogie-woogie style by Pete Johnson's "627 Stomp".

In his younger days Duskin performed in clubs in Cincinnati and across the river in Newport, Kentucky. While serving in the U.S. Army in World War II, he continued to play and, in entertaining American servicemen, met his idols Johnson, Albert Ammons and Meade Lux Lewis.

After his military service ended, Duskin's father caught him playing boogie in the church and made him promise to stop playing in that style while he was still alive. However, Rev. Duskin lived to the age of 105, and in the meantime, Joe found employment as a police officer and as a postal worker. Effectively in the middle of his career, he never played a keyboard for sixteen years.

By the early 1970s Duskin had begun playing the piano at festivals in the U.S. and across Europe. By 1978, and with the reputation for his concert playing now growing, his first recording, Cincinnati Stomp, was released on Arhoolie Records. The album contained Duskin's cover version of "Down the Road a Piece" and featured Jimmy Johnson and Muddy Waters's guitarist Bob Margolin.

He subsequently toured Austria and Germany, and in 1987 he made his first visit to the U.K. The same year his part in John Jeremy's film Boogie Woogie Special, recorded for The South Bank Show, raised Duskin's profile. In 1988, accompanied by guitarist/producer Dave Peabody, Duskin recorded his third album, Don't Mess with the Boogie Man first released on Special Delivery Records. He was also a guest and invited to perform on the BBC program Bravo accompanied by the Rolling Stones drummer Charlie Watts. In the following decade, Duskin performed several times at the New Orleans Jazz and Heritage Festival and the Chicago Blues Festival.

His touring in Europe continued before he recorded his final album at the Quai du Blues in Neuilly, France. Several Duskin albums were issued on European labels in the 1980s and 1990s. It was 2004 before his third American release, Big Joe Jumps Again! (Yellow Dog Records) was issued; it was his first studio recording in sixteen years. It featured Philip Paul (drums), Ed Conley (bass), and Peter Frampton on guitar.

Duskin's 84th birthday party was held on February 10, 2005, at The Fat Fish Blue, Newport, Kentucky, and included a gathering of musicians and friends including Larry Bloomfield, Larry Nager, Philip Paul, Ed Conley, James Ibold, Frank Lynch and more paying tribute. It helped record his final offering, a double CD album set for Cottage On The Hill Records.

Suffering from the effects of diabetes, Duskin was on the eve of having legs amputated, when he died in May 2007, at the age of 86. The Ohio-based Big Joe Duskin Music Education Foundation keeps his musical ideals alive by producing in-school music presentations for public-school children.

== Selected discography ==
- 1978: Cincinnati Stomp (Arhoolie)
- 1985: Live ELECTRIC Boogie! (Mirage Independent)
- 1988: Don't Mess with the Boogie Man (Indigo)
- 1990: Down the Road a Piece, live album (Wolf)
- 2004: Big Joe Jumps Again! Cincinnati Blues Session (Yellow Dog Records)
- 2004: Live at Quai de Blues, live album (Virgin)
- 2005: 84th Birthday Party - Live at Fat Fish Blue (Cottage On The Hill Records)

== Awards and honors ==
In 2000 Duskin received a Lifetime Achievement "Cammy" ("Cammy" was the nickname for The Cincinnati Enquirer Pop Music Award, which was presented annually to musicians identified with the tri-State area of Kentucky, Ohio, and Indiana)

Duskin was presented with a key to the city in 2004 by the mayor of Cincinnati. The following year he was a recipient of a National Heritage Fellowship awarded by the National Endowment for the Arts, which is the U.S. highest honor in the folk and traditional arts.

== Quotation ==
Duskin said in 1987,

My dad was a minister, and he was kind of fanatic over religion. When he first knew that I was playing piano, he said "Don't you never play that devil's music in here. I'll tear you up if I catch you playing that."..[Years later, his father discovered him playing the blues.]...The old man come in there and jumped on me. Now, when he got done whipping me, I said, "Pop, you might as well get with it. This is what I want to do." He looked at me and said, "Joe, I'm 89 years old. I'm not going to live too long. Why don't you just make an agreement with me not to play the devil's music till I'm dead in the grave?" Well, I shook his hand and I never played a lick. And the old man died at 105.
