= The Soul of John Black =

- Genres: soul, blues, rock
- Years active: 2002–present
- Label: Yellow Dog Records
- Members: John Bigham
- Past members: Christopher Thomas
- Website: Official

The Soul of John Black is an American alternative soul, blues, and rock persona created by John Bigham.

== History ==
John Bigham was previously a member of the band Fishbone and also worked with Miles Davis and Everlast, while Christopher Thomas who was only a member for the first official record as well as the self-released sessions, had played with Joshua Redman and Betty Carter. The first release was a self-titled album which was issued in 2002. A different self-titled release arrived in 2003 on the No Mayo label and featured a blend of soul, funk, and hip hop. NPR named the track "Scandalous (No. 9)" one of the best of the year in All Songs Considered. By the release of the follow-up in 2007, Bigham was recording alone and essentially used the group as his own stage name. The sophomore release, The Good Girl Blues, focused on the blues but continued to incorporate elements from jazz, hip hop, rock & roll, and other styles. A third album, Black John, followed in 2009.

The Soul of John Black's The Good Girl Blues was nominated for the Seventh Annual Independent Music Awards for Blues Album of the year.

== Discography ==
- The Soul of John Black (Self-released, 2002)
- The Soul of John Black (No Mayo, 2003)
- The Good Girl Blues (Cadabra, 2007)
- The Good Girl Blues (Yellow Dog Records, 2007)
- Black John (Eclecto Groove, 2009)
- Good Thang (Yellow Dog Records, 2011)
- The Soul of Christmas (Yellow Dog Records, 2011)
- A Sunshine State of Mind (Yellow Dog Records, 2012)
- Early in the Moanin (2016)
- Soul Salvation (Yellow Dog Records, 2025)

== Awards ==
- Independent Music Awards 2014: "Higher Power" - Best R&B/Soul Song
- Independent Music Awards 2012: "My Brother" - Best Blues Song
