= Spanks for the Memories =

Studio album by Asylum Street Spankers
- Released: 1996
- Label: Watermelon
- Producer: Mark Rubin

Asylum Street Spankers chronology
Spanks for the Memories (1996)	Live (1997)

Spanks for the Memories is the debut studio album by the American band Asylum Street Spankers, released in 1996. They supported it with a North American tour.

== Production ==
Recorded over three days on the east side of Austin, the album was produced by Mark Rubin. The band used one microphone to capture all ten members. "If I Had Possession Over Judgement Day" is a cover of the Robert Johnson song. "Startin' to Hate Country" criticizes the country-pop sound of mid-1990s Nashville. "Shave 'em Dry" is a cover of Lucille Bogan's version of the song. "Lee Harvey", about Lee Harvey Oswald, employs yodeling.

== Critical reception ==
Professional ratings
Review scores
Source	Rating
All Music Guide to the Blues	4/5 stars
Austin American-Statesman	2.5/5 stars
MusicHound Country: The Essential Album Guide	3.5/5 stars
Springfield News-Leader	2/4 stars
Winston-Salem Journal	3/4 stars

The St. Louis Post-Dispatch said that the band "produce a lazy, retro sound, although sometimes they mug as fiercely as Louis Armstrong trying to steal a scene from Barbra Streisand in Hello Dolly." The Austin American-Statesman opined that "all the Spankers' good songs are covers that already have been done to perfection." The Winston-Salem Journal stated that the album "combines hipster satire with witty original songs". The Springfield News-Leader called the band "experienced—and very good—players ... [who] aren't very funny". Robert Christgau praised "Startin' to Hate Country" and "Funny Cigarette".

== Track listing ==
No.	Title	Length
1.	"Introduction"
2.	"If I Had Possession Over Judgement Day"
3.	"Superchief"
4.	"Song with No Words"
5.	"Introduction"
6.	"Lee Harvey"
7.	"I'll See You in My Dreams"
8.	"Hesitation Blues"
9.	"Startin' to Hate Country"
10.	"Walkin' & Whistlin' Blues"
11.	"Shave 'em Dry"
12.	"Brazil"
13.	"Tradewinds"
14.	"Introduction"
15.	"Funny Cigarette"
16.	"Hometown Boy"
