= In Search of Blind Joe Death: The Saga of John Fahey =

- Film poster
- Directed by: James Cullingham
- Produced by: James Cullingham
- Edited by: Caroline Christie, Jessica Anne Cullingham
- Release date: 29 September 2012 (Raindance)
- Running time: 57 minutes
- Country: Canada
- Language: English

In Search of Blind Joe Death: The Saga of John Fahey is a 2012 documentary film that focuses on the life of the musician John Fahey, who is considered the father of American primitive guitar. The documentary was filmed and based in Washington D.C., where Fahey was born; the Mississippi Delta, where Fahey met and recorded with many musicians; and Salem, Oregon, where Fahey resided during the last 20 years of his life. The documentary includes a series of video clips of Fahey's performances and interviews with those who were involved with the musician in his personal and professional life up until his death in 2001. The film gives viewers an understanding of what Fahey's personal world was like, and how he worked as a musician through animation, interviews, video clips, and documentations of Fahey.

The film premiered at the 2012 Raindance Film Festival.

== Interviewees ==
- Melody Fahey
- Chris Funk
- Barry Hansen
- Joe Bussard
- Joey Burns
- Terry Robb
- Pete Townshend
- Rob Bowman
- Stefan Grossman

== Reception ==
Music critic Richie Unterberger called the film "well done" and respectful, but noted the film "could have been more comprehensive." Writing for The Quietus, Sean Kitching praised the film as a "wonderful, expressionist documentary [that] admirably portrays the many facets of the man behind the music and the myth." Conversely, Jake Cole, writing for Spectrum Culture, summarized the film as "never [rising] above the mark of a mildly adventurous TV special, and its stylistic cleverness cannot disguise that this is, at heart, not far off from a cursory overview" and claimed "there is a gap here that makes Cullingham’s inventive and atypical approach to artist biography feel incorporeal. It avoids the pitfall of over-explaining an artist with a dull information-dump, but it nevertheless fails to fully join its impressionistic melding of image with Fahey’s music to any deeper revelations, which results in a play of signs without a signifier."
