= Revolutionary Boogie =

Studio album by Michael Powers
- Released: 2011
- Label: Zoho Roots
- Producer: Eric R. Durham

Michael Powers chronology
Prodigal Son (2006)	Revolutionary Boogie (2011)	Pumping Hot Latin Blues Live (2015)

Revolutionary Boogie is a 2011 album by blues guitarist and singer Michael Powers. This was the follow up to his album Prodigal Son that was released in 2006.

== Background ==
The album which was produced by Eric R. Durham was released on August 9, 2011. It was also released on Blues Boulevard Records 250297 in November 2011, and on Music Avenue 250297. In addition to his own material, the album also featured covers of material by Muddy Waters, Elmore James, Jimi Hendrix and Willie Dixon. Three songs, "Shake Your Money Maker", "I Ain't Superstitious" and "Honeybee" are recorded with backing by The Mana’o Trio, which according to Blues Finland have a Hawaiian connection.

== Reception ==
Joachim 'Joe' Brookes of Rock Times reviewed the album. The review was dated July 22, 2011. He finished off with, "Insgesamt hat Michael Powers mit "Revolutionary Boogie" einen würdigen Nachfolger für "Prodigal Son" eingespielt. Die neue Scheibe kommt kurz hinter dem Vorgänger ins Ziel." Translated into English:"Michael Powers has recorded a worthy successor to "Prodigal Son" with "Revolutionary Boogie". The new album comes in just behind its predecessor."

Mark Johnson of Sea of Tranquility gave the album four stars in a review that was published on August 19, 2001. He said that the moment you put in the CD it rocks. And he said that the backing instruments only enhance what Powers is doing through the chords. He named the Jimi Hendrix song "Spanish Castle Magic" as the highlight of the album. He finished off with telling the reader to get this album if they like boogie and blues.

The review by David Maine of PopMatters was published on October 4, 2011. He started off with questioning what was so revolutionary about the album. He did say that the artist knew his material and his brand of meaty, guitar-based blues is powerful and satisfying. He also said that Powers had a strong, expressive voice, and his singing nicely complemented his thunderous guitar slinging. He rated the album with a seven.

A brief review of the album by Classic Rock by Henry Yates was published on October 12, 2011, in its "Blues Round-up: November 2011" set of reviews. He said the album wasn't doing much what you hadn't heard before but inferred that the reliable vocal and excellent guitar made up for it. He also made a reference to Powers that at his age, at nearly sixty, he wouldn't be likely to change the world, "but he can still start one hell of a party".

The album received a positive review from Blues Finland which was published on 9, November 2011.

The album got a brief review by La hora del blues which was published in May, 2013. The album was rated as very good. The reviewer said that the album presented Powers' vocal and instrumental abilities on the thirteen songs which included his own and covers of Muddy Waters, Elmore James, Jimi Hendrix and Willie Dixon songs.

== Album details ==
=== Track listing ===
- 01. "I Miss Your Kissin'"
- 02. "Bleecker Street Strut"
- 03. "Power of Midnight Lightning"
- 04. "Got's to Go"
- 05. "Spanish Castle Magic"
- 06. "Shake Your Money Maker"
- 07. "It's About that Time"
- 08. "I Ain't Superstitious"
- 09. "Lookin' for the Truth"
- 10. "Uprising"
- 11. "Honeybee"
- 12. "Revolutionary Boogie"
- 13. "Gotta Go Right Now"

=== Credits ===
- Michael Powers (lead vocals, guitar)

With Michael Powers Frequency Band

- Billy Cristiani (bass - #3 – 5,7,9,13)
- Tobsy M. Durham (tambourine, maracas, cowbell - #1,4,12,13)
- Barry Harrison (drums - #3,4,9,13)

With Mana'o Trio

- Don Lopez (bass)
- Miguel Sobel (percussion)
- Paul Marchetti (drums - #6,8,11)

With

- Angel Rose (vocals - #1,7,9)
- Danny 'Doc' Lane (slide guitar - #12)
- John 'Chops' Colianni (keyboards - #3)
- Henry 'Piano' Butler (keyboards - #1)
- Eric A. Durham (rhythm guitar, synthesizer, sound effects)
- Charlie Torres (bass - #1,2,10,12, congas - #1)
- Neil Burton (drums - #1,2,5,7,10,12)

== Post Revolutionary Boogie ==
Powers released Pumping Hot Latin Blues Live in 2015.
