= Dani Wilde =

English singer-songwriter and guitarist (born 1985)

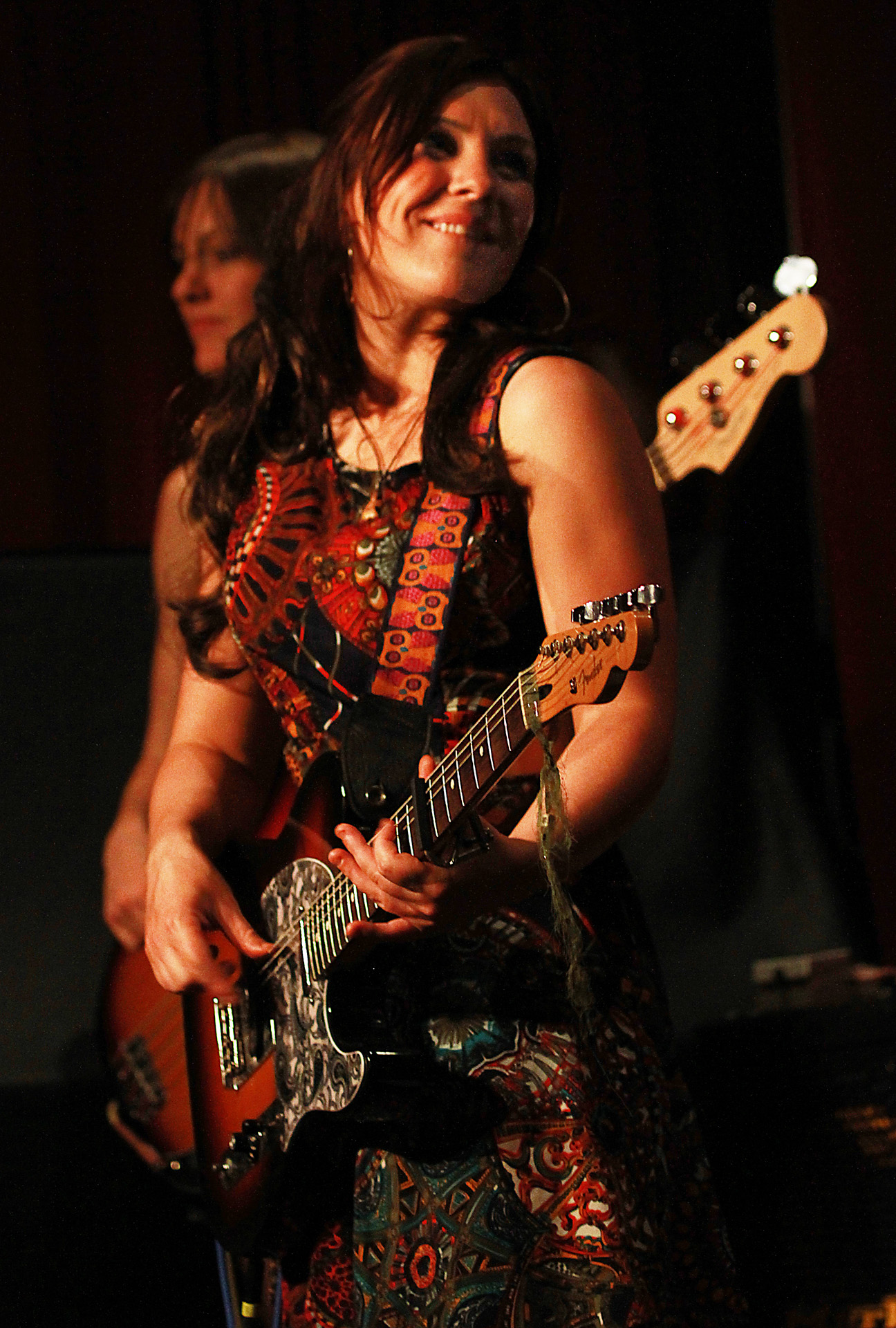
- Dani Wilde performing live in Luxembourg, 2013

Background information
- Born: Danielle Christina Wilde; 25 August 1985 (age 40); Hullavington, Wiltshire, England
- Genres: Blues, British soul, country, gospel
- Occupations: Singer, songwriter, guitarist
- Instruments: Guitar, vocals
- Years active: 2007–present
- Labels: Ruf Records, Bri-Tone Records, VizzTone Label Group
- Website: daniwilde.com

Dani Wilde (born 25 August 1985) is an English singer-songwriter and guitarist who fuses roots genres including blues, country, gospel, soul and Americana into popular song.

The American periodical, Blues Blast, noted in 2017 that "Dani Wilde is a modern day British blues phenomenon... Live at Brighton Road is a treat for the eyes and ears... the overall effect is breathtaking".

== Career ==
After graduating with her first class degree in Vocals at the Brighton Institute of Modern Music (BIMM) in 2005, Dani Wilde was signed to the international blues record label Ruf Records in September 2007, with the release of her debut album Heal My Blues in January 2008.

Since then, Wilde had toured across the UK, Europe, Canada, America and Africa. In 2009, she released her second album, Shine with the veteran record producer Mike Vernon. In May 2012, Wilde's third album Juice Me Up was released.

In 2015, Wilde established her own label Bri-Tone Records. Her 2015 release on her own label charted in the I-Tunes Country Music Album Charts in 10 countries including the UK, France, Germany, Spain, Italy, Switzerland, Austria, Japan and South Africa as well as the Top 30 in Finland.

Wilde has achieved three number ones in the official European I-Tunes Blues charts with her singles "Bring Your Loving Home" (album: Heal my Blues), "Abandoned Child" (album: Shine) and "Bitch" (album: Girls with Guitars). In 2013, Wilde's single "Loving You", released on Bri-Tone Records, entered into the European Country Music Chart's Top 40. Her single Open Road peaked at number 8 in the Hungary iTunes Blues Chart in 2017, as well as the Top 30 in Switzerland and Top 40 in Iran. In September 2017, Wilde was the only British artist in the Roots Music Report Chart's Blues Top 50. She peaked at number 28, just beneath the Tedeschi Trucks Band. On 11 October 2017, following BBC Radio 2 airplay and the support of many independent radio stations, Wilde's song "Deeper Than Black" from her album Live at Brighton Road peaked at Number 5 in the British I-Tunes Blues Chart, placing her alongside her contemporaries Van Morrison, Beth Hart, Joe Bonamassa and Jonny Lang.

Wilde has had regular airplay on The Paul Jones Show on BBC Radio 2, and has been a featured artist for BBC Radio 2's Maida Vale Live Sessions on four occasions.

In 2015, Wilde was awarded Best Female Vocalist at The British Blues Awards.

From 2015 until 2016, Wilde worked as a columnist for Classic Rock 's 'The Blues Mag'. Her column 'Wilde About The Blues' celebrates the lives and achievements of blues women throughout history. She currently writes about phenomenal blues women in history for Blues Matters.

In July 2016, Wilde's self-penned pop song "R U Sweet On Me" was featured in NBC's drama series Aquarius. The song which featured Wilde on lead vocals and Fergus Gerrand on drums, was originally composed for Amy Winehouse's god daughter, Dionne Bromfield, for a Disney movie proposal.

In 2017, Wilde signed to VizzTone Group. Her debut for the label Live at Brighton Road was released in June 2017. Live at Brighton Road was mastered by Jon Astley. The album performances were filmed by Philip James and is available as a special edition CD and DVD set as well a vinyl LP and digital download. In March 2020. Wilde signed a new contract with Vizztone and released a new single "Howling At The Moon". Blues Blast magazine noted that "Dani Wilde is a modern day British blues phenomenon... Live at Brighton Road is a treat for the eyes and ears... the overall effect is breathtaking". In 2022–23, Wilde continues to release a run of successful singles for Vizztone including "You Are My Sunshine " / "Didn't it Rain" - a collaboration with Christopher Holland, "I Miss The World", "Vagabond Child" featuring Will Wilde on harmonica and "Sunshine", also featuring her sibling Will Wilde.

Wilde's latest single, an all-female rock and roll track featuring Victoria Smith on bass guitar and Abby White on drums entitled "Baby Please (Stop Smokin' That Weed)", entered the UK ITunes Blues Charts at Number 4 upon its release on 13 January 2024.

Wilde is endorsed by Rotosound Guitar Strings. She is also part of the group Girls With Guitars and is endorsed by Fender USA.

== Collaborations ==
2024 saw Wilde team up with Ruf Records artist Krissy Matthews as a featured artist on his album, Krissy Matthews and Friends. Wilde contributed vocals on the track "Learn to Live with the Blues", composed by Matthews and Cream lyricist Pete Brown, which charted at Number 2 in Germany's ITunes Blues Chart on 19 June 2024. Wilde performed at the album launch show in London, sharing the stage with Krissy Matthews, Will Wilde, Clem Clempson of Humble Pie, and Malcolm Bruce (son of Jack Bruce).

March 2024 saw Wilde as a featured vocalist on the Spanish blues artist Javier Vargas' new album, Best of my Blues. Wilde delivered a lead vocal on two tracks; a rendition of "Why" originally by Annie Lennox, and a cover of Freddie King's "Palace of the King", which Wilde performed as a duet with Chris Jagger.

In January 2017, Wilde was featured as a special guest on a recording featuring Kiko Garcia, Jeff Asselin and Brian Asselin of Motown's Funk Brothers. Wilde wrote the chorus section of the song entitled "Stop", and contributed lead and backing vocals.

Wilde has collaborated with a number of artists during her career. In the 2010 WOMAD festival, Wilde performed live alongside Pee Wee Ellis, Juldeh Camara and Justin Adams. Wilde has also performed on stage with Christopher Holland as the opening act for Jools Holland at The Royal Albert Hall. Wilde contributed guest vocals on Oli Brown's 2012 track 'Like a Feather' and has performed backing vocals on albums for blues artists including Will Wilde, Marcus Malone and Gregory Coulson. In 2011, Wilde performed live backing vocals for Tim Robbins with his Blues Band at the Ottawa Blues Festival in Canada. Other acts Wilde has opened for include Journey, Foreigner, Johnny Winter and Robben Ford. She has also shared stages with Lazy Lester and Debbie Davies, and shared the bill with Bobby Womack, Bobby Bland, Koko Taylor, Tedeschi Trucks Band and Sound Garden.

In 2008, Wilde toured The UK, Europe and the US with Candye Kane, Sue Foley and Deborah Coleman on Ruf Records 'Guitared and Feathers Blues Caravan tour'. In 2011, Wilde collaborated with Samantha Fish and Cassie Taylor on the Ruf Records 'Girls with Guitars Blues Caravan World Tour'. That year, they also recorded and released a studio album Girls with Guitars. In 2012, the tour schedule continued and the group released a live CD/DVD with British bassist Victoria Smith replacing Cassie Taylor.

In 2016, Wilde performed live in Brighton with the Malian singer, Vieux Farka Touré, the son of Ali Farka Touré. More recently Wilde has sessioned on the Australian blues musician Harpo Walker's release, Bruised Heart Blues, which hit number one on the UK IBBA blues album chart in 2023.

== Humanitarian work ==
Wilde is an advocate for children's rights. She has worked with the charity "Moving Mountains" to help improve education for street children and orphans in Embu, Kenya.

== Discography ==
=== Albums ===
- 2008: Heal My Blues – CD – Ruf Records
- 2011: Shine – CD – Ruf Records
- 2011: Girls With Guitars – CD – Ruf Records
- 2012: Juice Me Up – CD – Ruf Records
- 2012: Girls With Guitars Live – DVD – Ruf Records
- 2015: Songs About You – CD – Bri-Tone Records
- 2017: Live at Brighton Road – CD/DVD and Vinyl LP release – VizzTone Label Group

=== Singles ===
- 2012: "R U Sweet On Me" (download only)
- 2013: "Loving You" (download only)
- 2013: "Love Hurts" (download only)
- 2017: "Stop" (with Kiko Garcia and Brian Asselin – promotional release)
- 2017: "Deeper Than Black" (From the album Live at Brighton Road – VizzTone Label Group)
- 2020: "Howling At The Moon" – Vizztone Label Group
- 2021: "Pluto" – Vizztone Label Group
- 2021: "Don't Fish in My Sea" – Vizztone Label Group
- 2021: "Wild Women" – Vizztone Label Group
- 2022: "You Are My Sunshine" / "Didn't it Rain" Ft Christopher Holland – Vizztone Label Group
- 2023: "I Miss The World" – Vizztone Label Group
- 2023: "Vagabond Child" – Vizztone Label Group
- 2023: "Sunshine" – Vizztone Label Group
- 2024: "Baby Please (Stop Smokin' That Weed...)" - Vizztone Label Group
- 2026: "The Vizztone Sessions" - Vizztone Label Group
