= Curtis Salgado =

American singer-songwriter

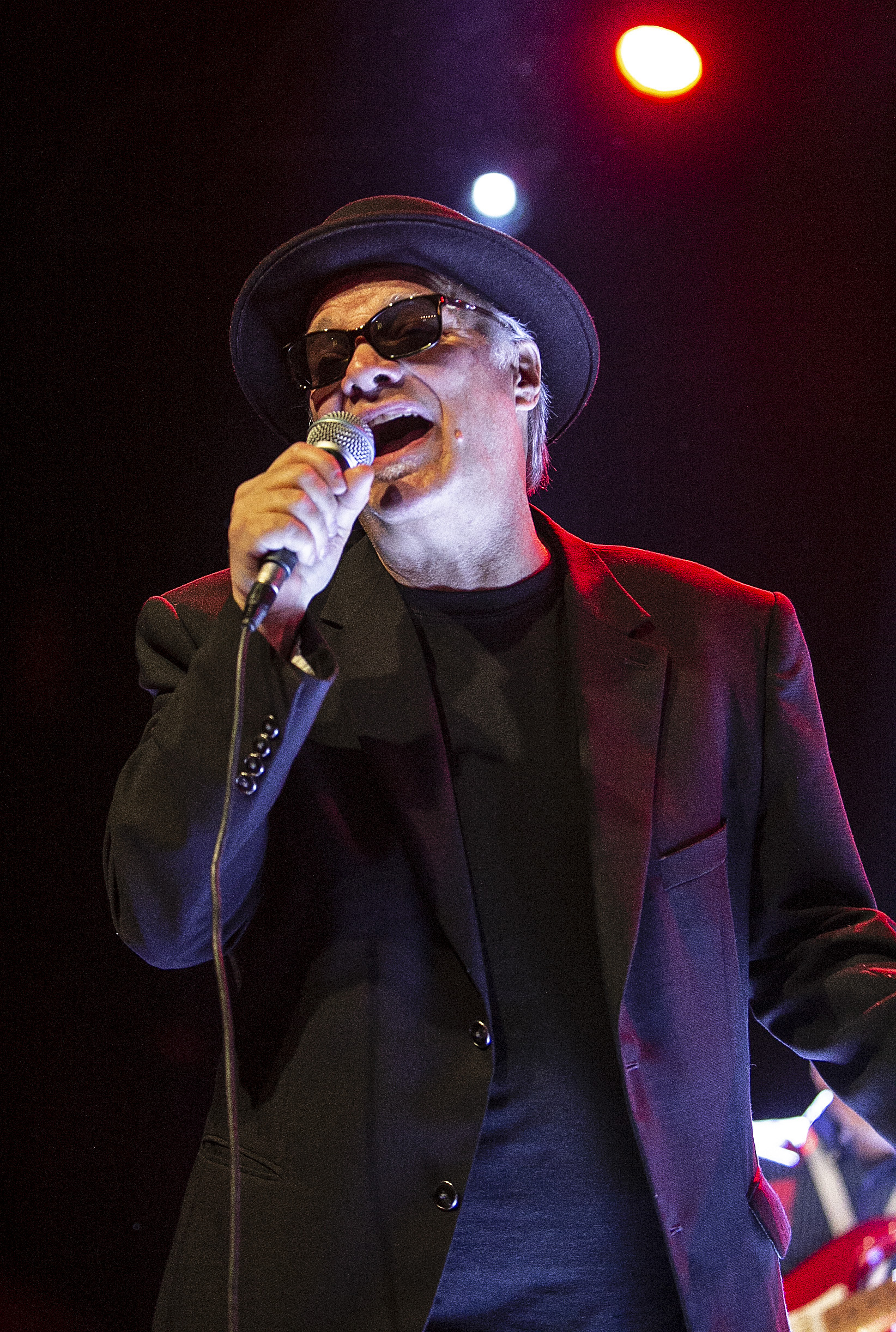

Background information
- Born: February 4, 1954 (age 72); Everett, Washington, United States
- Genres: Blues, blues rock, blue-eyed soul
- Occupations: Harmonicist, singer-songwriter
- Instruments: Harmonica, vocals
- Years active: 1970s–present

Curtis Salgado (born February 4, 1954, in Everett, Washington, United States) is a Portland, Oregon-based blues, blues rock, and blue-eyed soul singer-songwriter. He plays harmonica and fronts his own band as lead vocalist.

== Career ==
Salgado began his career leading The Nighthawks, based in Eugene, Oregon. He then joined forces with Robert Cray and sang and played harmonica in The Robert Cray Band for six years, including singing on Cray's debut album, released in 1980. Salgado and Cray parted ways in 1982. Salgado went on to front Roomful of Blues, singing and touring with them from 1984 through 1986. Returning to Oregon, he formed Curtis Salgado & The Stilettos in 1991 on the JRS label. The band opened for The Steve Miller Band during the summer of 1992. In 1995, Curtis spent a short stint as the lead singer with the band Santana. In 1997, he and Portland guitarist Terry Robb toured with Miller to promote their album Hit It 'n Quit It, including an appearance with Miller on the NBC television show Late Night with Conan O'Brien where Salgado and Robb performed their original composition "Bitter Tears." He signed with Shanachie Records in 1999 and released four albums on that label, before signing with Chicago's Alligator Records in 2012.

Salgado was the inspiration behind John Belushi's creation of the Blues Brothers characters in the late 1970s. They met and became friends while Belushi was in Eugene, Oregon, filming the movie Animal House. The Blues Brothers' debut album Briefcase Full of Blues is dedicated to Salgado, and Cab Calloway's character in The Blues Brothers film is named after Curtis.

Salgado was diagnosed with liver cancer in 2005, and underwent a successful liver transplant in 2006. He continues to record and perform his music. On June 13, 2006, a benefit concert was held in his honor in Portland to raise funds for his medical treatment. Among those who performed were Little Charlie & the Nightcats, Everclear, Taj Mahal, The Robert Cray Band, and Steve Miller. Also in attendance was the widow of John Belushi who spoke of Salgado's part in the development of The Blues Brothers. On April 29, 2007, another benefit was held in Curtis' honor, bringing Steve Miller and Little Charlie and the boys back, and adding Jimmie Vaughan, and harp players Charlie Musselwhite and Kim Wilson.

Salgado was nominated for four of the Blues Foundation's 2009 Blues Music Awards, including Soul Blues Male Artist of the Year and Soul Blues Album of the year for his album, Clean Getaway. In 2010, Salgado won the Soul Blues Male Artist of the Year award, which he won again in 2012. In 2013, he won the Blues Music Award for the B.B. King Entertainer of the Year, Soul Blues Male Artist and Soul Shot won Soul Blues Album of the Year.

In 2013, Salgado was nominated for a Blues Music Award in four separate categories. In 2017, Salgado won three Blues Music Awards in different categories. At the 2023 Blues Music Awards, Salgado was named as 'Soul Blues Male Artist of the Year'. In 2025, Curtis won the Blues Music Award for Soul Blues Male Singer and his album Fine By Me won for Soul Blues Album.

== See also ==
- Music of Oregon
- List of people from Portland, Oregon
- List of harmonicists

== Discography ==
- 1991: Curtis Salgado & The Stilettos (JRS Records)
- 1995: More Than You Can Chew (Rhythm Safari/Priority Records)
- 1997: Hit It 'N' Quit It, Curtis Salgado & Terry Robb (Lucky Records)
- 1999: Wiggle Outta This (Shanachie Records)
- 2001: Soul Activated (Shanachie)
- 2004: Strong Suspicion (Shanachie)
- 2008: Clean Getaway (Shanachie)
- 2012: Soul Shot (Alligator Records)
- 2016: The Beautiful Lowdown (Alligator)
- 2018: Rough Cut, Curtis Salgado & Alan Hager (Alligator)
- 2021: Damage Control (Alligator)
- 2024: Fine By Me (Little Village Foundation)
- 2026: Legacy Rewind: Live in '25 (Nola Blue Records)
