= Prodigal Son (Michael Powers album) =

Studio album by Michael Powers
- Released: 2006
- Length: 47:43
- Label: Baryon
- Producer: Steve Rosenthal

Michael Powers chronology
Onyx Root (2004)	Prodigal Son (2006)	Revolutionary Boogie

Prodigal Son is a studio album by blues musician Michael Powers, released in 2006. A follow up to his previous album Onyx Root, Prodigal Son was well received and gained him more recognition.

== Background ==
In 2006, Powers released his Prodigal Son album. In addition to his six original compositions, he covered material by Sonny Boy Williamson, Bob Dylan, Jimmy Reed, Rev. Gary Davis, Arthur Lee and Tiny Bradshaw.

It was listed by Mojo as no. 3 in the Best Blues Albums section of "Mojo - the 50 best albums of 2006".

== Reception ==
Benjy of Rock of Ages first discovered Michael Powers on a Classic Rock magazine sampler. He said that Prodigal Son was the best blues rock album since he had heard Joe Bonamassa's debut.

Jim Santella of All About Jazz reviewed the album and gave it three stars. He said "For the most part, Powers rocks hard with electric guitar and plenty of action".

Robin Denselow of The Guardian reviewed the album which was published on 6 January 2007. He gave it four stars. He referred to Powers' previous album Onyx Root (his solo debut), which he said was remarkable for the variety and the skill Powers had in making well-known songs his own. With this album he said that it was more eclectic. He mentioned the way that Powers went through the songs and mentioned Powers' acoustic finger picking on the track "Compassion". He also said that the title track which Powers wrote would be one of the blues songs of the year.

Lahoradel Blues reviewed the album in 2007 with the reviewer saying "You can't deny it's a splendid record" and that he showed "talent, passion and knowledge in every song he plays". The examples given were, "Goin' Down", "White Lightning", "Wild Side", "Compassion" and "Prodigal Son".

David Barnard of Exclaim! reviewed the album. He mentioned Powers' covering of the Arthur Lee song "Signed D. C.". He noted a similarity between the two artists, and noted the dilemma of both Powers and Lee having to find acceptance as a rock musician. He finished off by saying that the album was diverse and original and that it deserved to be heard beyond the blues ghetto.

Greg Prato of AllMusic reviewed the album and said that it had a clean production. He also said that while it was not musically ground breaking, it should appeal to Stevie Ray Vaughan, Jonny Lang, and Los Lonely Boys fans.

A review by Frankie Bluesy Pfeiffer of Blues magazine was posted on Paris Move. Frankie said that the album was a mix of genres and styles that make this CD very best for the beginning of the year.

== Track listing ==
1. "Goin' Down" (Michael Murchison) – 3:45
2. "It's a Bloody Life" (Sonny Boy Williamson) – 3:20
3. "Prodigal Son" (Murchison) – 4:37
4. "White Lightning" (Murchison) – 4:06
5. "Wild Side" (Murchison) – 3:59
6. "Every Grain of Sand" (Bob Dylan) – 4:49
7. "Lay the Hooch" (Murchison) – 2:41
8. "Oh John" (Jimmy Reed) – 3:33
9. "Signed D.C." (Arthur Lee) – 4:33
10. "Compassion" (Murchison) – 4:36
11. "You Got to Go Down" (Blind Gary Davis) – 4:30
12. "Train Kept a Rollin'" (Howie Kay, Lois Mann, Tiny Bradshaw) – 3:14

== Musicians ==
Adapted from Hooked on Music.

- Michael Powers – vocals, electric and acoustic guitars, dobro
- Jimmy Vivino – Wurlitzer piano, Hammond organ, acoustic guitar, Mellotron
- Cliff Schmitt – bass, upright bass
- Michael Merritt – bass
- James Wormworth – drums
- Steve Shelley – drums
- Jimi Shivago – Hammond organ, 12-string guitar, vibraphone
- Steve Rosenthal – producer

== Post Prodigal Son ==
Powers followed up the album with Revolutionary Boogie which was released in the US on Zoho Roots ZM 201109 in 2011.
