= Yellow Dog Records =

- Founded: 2002
- Founder: Mike Powers
- Genre: Blues, soul, folk, Americana
- Country of origin: United States
- Location: Memphis, Tennessee
- Official website: yellowdogrecords.com

Yellow Dog Records is an American independent record label based in Memphis, Tennessee, that features authentic American music: blues, soul and Americana. It was founded in 2002 by Mike Powers to support independent musicians on its roster with recording, production, promotion and distribution.

Artists on the label have received numerous awards and played with notable musicians, including Eden Brent - Blues Music Award recipient for 2009 Acoustic Artist of the Year and Acoustic Album of the Year for Mississippi Number One, plus the winner of the Blues Foundation's 2006 International Blues Challenge; Fiona Boyes – the first Australian and the first woman to win the Blues Foundation's International Blues Challenge and three time Blues Music Award nominee; Mary Flower – 2008 Blues Music Award nominee for Acoustic Artist of the Year; and Terry Robb – 19 time Best Acoustic Guitar Muddy Award winner from the Cascade Blues Association and Oregon Music Hall of Fame member.

The label name is inspired by the Yellow Dog Railroad and its role in American music history. The Yazoo Delta railroad, known as the "Yellow Dog", was a renowned rail line running through the heart of the Mississippi delta in the early 1900s. References to the Yellow Dog appear in early blues songs by W.C. Handy, Bessie Smith, Charlie Patton, Lucille Bogan and Big Bill Broonzy.

In January 2016, Yellow Dog Records was a recipient of the 2016 Keeping the Blues Alive Awards, presented by the Blues Foundation.

== Roster ==
- Asylum Street Spankers
- Bluff City Backsliders
- The Bo-Keys
- Fiona Boyes
- Eden Brent
- The Claudettes
- Chris Cotton
- Big Joe Duskin
- William Lee Ellis
- Mary Flower
- Mark Lemhouse
- Colin Linden
- Calvin Newborn
- Terry Robb
- The Soul of John Black
- Cassie Taylor
- Woodbrain
