= Mary Flower =

- Origin: Delphi, Indiana, United States
- Genres: Blues, folk
- Instruments: Vocals, guitar
- Years active: 1970–present
- Labels: Yellow Dog Records; Bluesette Music, Buffalo
- Website: maryflower.com

Mary Flower is an American musician and music educator on the independent Yellow Dog Records label. A blues and ragtime fingerstyle guitarist and vocalist, she combines intricate syncopated Piedmont style fingerpicking with lap-slide guitar.

In 2000 and 2003, Flower placed in the top three at the National Finger Style Guitar Championship, the only female to do this twice for guitar.

She's performed with Jorma Kaukonen, guitarist/songwriter Pat Donohue, Hot Rize founder Tim O'Brien, singer Mollie O'Brien, guitarist/songwriter Geoff Muldaur, and the Campbell Brothers. As a songwriter, arranger and educator she has several musical and instructional releases to her credit. She is currently based in Portland, Oregon, United States.

== Biography ==
=== Early life, music career ===
Flower grew up in a musical family and first performed as a high schooler in her hometown of Delphi, Indiana. In the early 1970s, after attending a concert by Delta transplant Yank Rachell, an acclaimed singer/mandolinist/guitarist, Flower was inspired to deepen her pursuit of blues music, and began in earnest her decades long musical career.

She made connections with talented musicians early on, introducing Caroline Peyton to the music scene in Bloomington, Indiana. Peyton would go on to a successful career as a solo musician and a Disney vocalist for several productions.

In 1972 Flower moved to Denver, accompanied by friend Randy Handley. Here she teamed up with country-folk singer-songwriter Katy Moffatt and ventured out for several successful tours with her on the National College Coffeehouse Circuit. Her skills garnered her a fellowship from the Colorado Council on Arts and Humanities.

While raising a family in Denver she developed a strong regional following, worked closely with future Prairie Home Companion regular Pat Donohue, and founded the loosely organized band Mother Folkers.

After thirty years in Denver, in 2004, she moved to Portland, OR and was signed soon after to Yellow Dog Records.

=== As educator ===
Teaching others has been a consistent trend in Flower's career. She developed the core classes at the Swallow Hill School of Music and was a teacher there from 1990 to 2004. Nationally she's been part of the Blues in Schools program, developed five instructional DVDs, and teaches workshops at many festivals where she also performs. In 2010 she heads up guitar week at the Augusta Heritage Center.

== Awards ==
Won

- 2010: Independent Music Awards Vox Pop Acoustic Song winner for "Slow Lane to Glory"
- 2003: National Finger Style Guitar Championship – Mary Flower – Third place (Finalist)
- 2000: National Finger Style Guitar Championship – Mary Flower – Third place (Finalist)
- 1987: Best Folkie in Denver from the Best of Westword (three-time winner)

Nominated

- Independent Music Awards – Acoustic Song of the Year (2009) – Slow Lane to Glory from "Bridges"
- Blues Music Award nominee for Acoustic Artist of The Year (2008)
- 2008 & 2009 Muddy Awards, Best Acoustic Guitar nominee

== Discography ==
=== Albums ===
- When My Bluebird Sings (Bluesette Records, 2014)
- Misery Loves Company (Yellow Dog Records, 2011)
- Bridges (Yellow Dog Records, 2009)
- Instrumental Breakdown (Yellow Dog Records, 2007)
- Bywater Dance (Yellow Dog Records, 2005)
- Ragtime Gal (Bluesette Records, 2003)
- Ladyfingers (Bluesette Records, 2001)
- Honey from the Comb (Time & Strike, 1999)
- Rosewood & Steel (Bluesette Records, 1996)
- Blues Jubilee (Resounding Records, 1994)
- High Heeled Blues w/Vicki Taylor (Resounding Records, 1991)
- Cookin' with Flower (Bare Records, 1982)

=== Instructional ===
- Blues Guitar Arrangements (2007)
- Crash Course in Open Tunings (2007)
- Fingerstyle Blues in E (2006)
- Ragtime Guitar (2006)
- Arrangements in Dropped-D Tuning (2006)
