= James Cullingham =

Canadian filmmaker (born 1954)

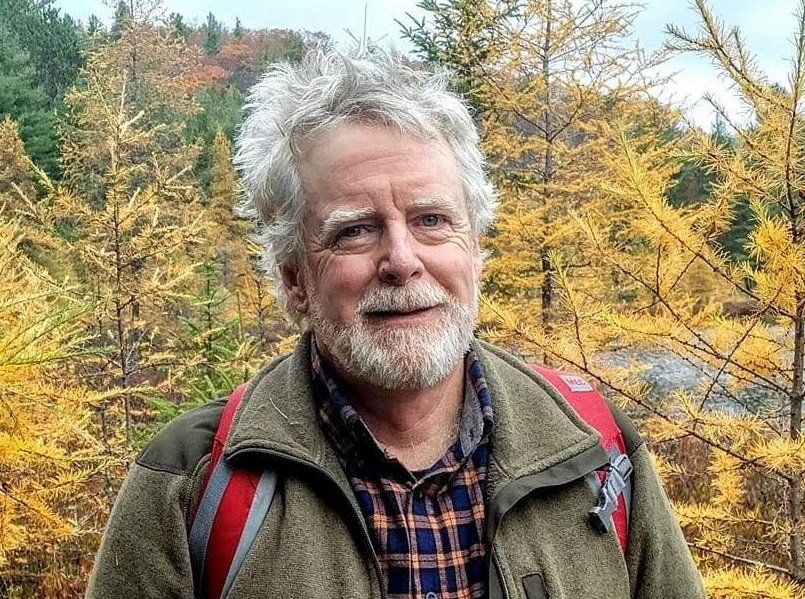
- Cullingham in 2019
- Born: March 5, 1954 (age 72); Toronto, Ontario, Canada
- Education: York University (PhD); University of Toronto (MA); Trent University (BA)
- Occupations: Documentary filmmaker; Historian; Journalist
- Years active: 1983–present

James Cullingham (born March 5, 1954) is a Canadian documentary filmmaker, historian, and journalist based in Peterborough, Ontario. His work primarily focuses on social justice, Indigenous rights, and popular culture. He was previously a contributor for CBC Radio and has written for The Globe and Mail and the Toronto Star.

== Education and academic career ==
Cullingham earned a B.A. in Native Studies and French from Trent University in 1980. He completed a Master of Arts in History at the University of Toronto in 2005 and received his PhD in History from York University in 2014. His doctoral research examined Indigenous policy in Canada and Algeria.

He was a professor of journalism at Seneca University from 2002 to 2018. As of 2023 he was an adjunct graduate faculty member in Canadian Studies and Indigenous Studies at Trent University.

== Career ==
Cullingham began his journalism career at CBC Radio in 1983, later serving as executive producer of As It Happens (1987–1989). In 1997, he joined the CBC series Canada: A People's History as a producer.

In 1989, he founded Tamarack Productions. The company's first project was the 1991 documentary series As Long as the Rivers Flow, which examined Aboriginal rights in Canada. In 2021, he published the historical work Two Dead White Men: Duncan Campbell Scott, Jacques Soustelle, and the Failure of Indigenous Policy.

== Selected filmography ==
- The Cost of Freedom – Refugee Journalists in Canada (2021). Director and writer.
- Jim Galloway – A Journey in Jazz (2018). Director and writer.
- The Pass System (2015). Executive producer.
- In Search of Blind Joe Death: The Saga of John Fahey (2012). Director and producer.
- Duncan Campbell Scott: The Poet and The Indians (1994). Director and producer.
