= Duffy Bishop =

American singer

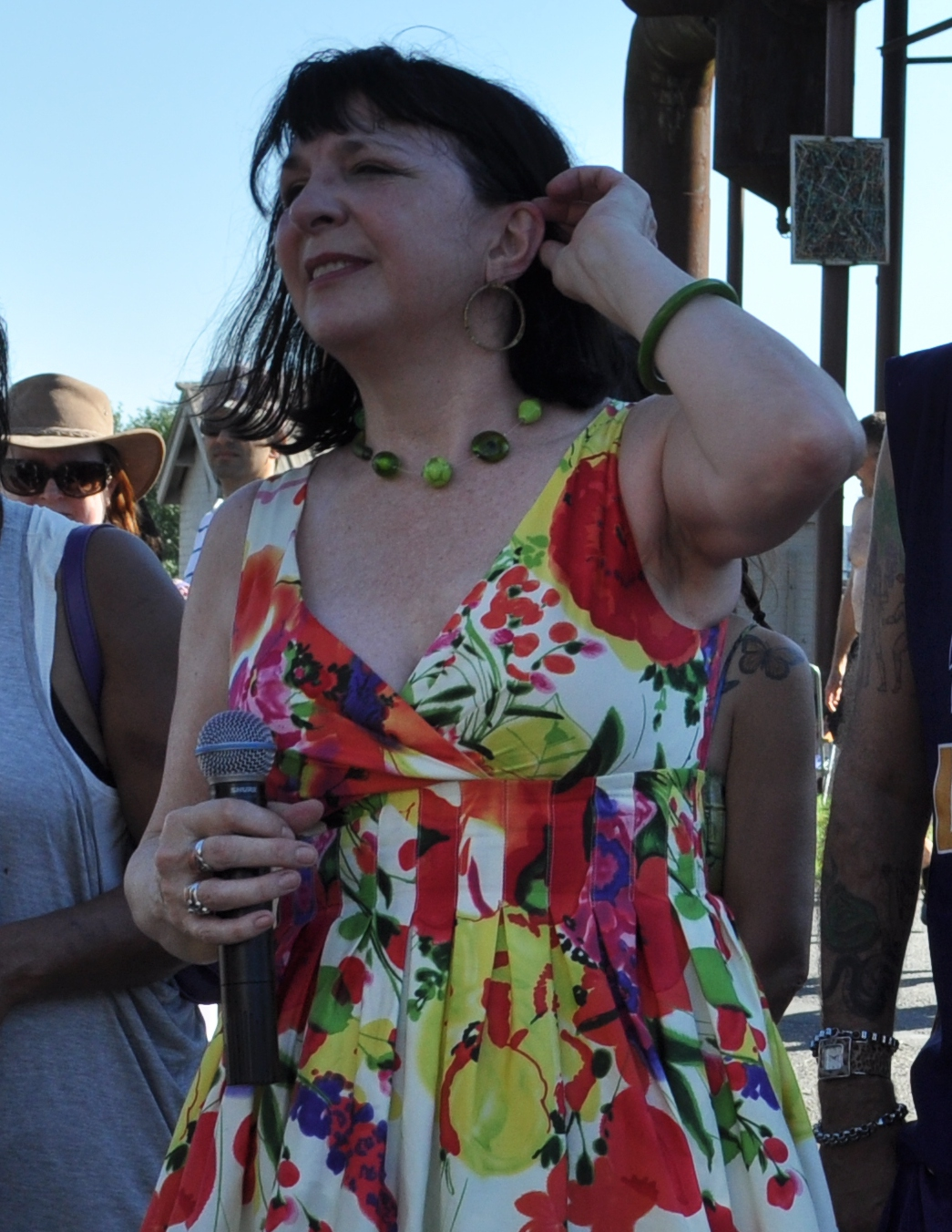
- Duffy Bishop, 2010

Background information
- Born: Redding, California, United States
- Genre: Electric blues
- Occupations: Singer, songwriter, costume designer, actor
- Years active: 1970s–present
- Label: Various

Duffy Bishop is an American electric blues singer and songwriter. She is in the Cascade Blues Association and Washington Blues Society Halls of Fame, and has been given a Lifetime Achievement Award by both bodies. In a career spanning over forty years, Bishop has also been a costume designer and an actress in musical theatre. To date she and her band have released seven albums. She has been the opening act for such artists as Roy Orbison, John Lee Hooker, Lou Rawls, Chicago, Ruth Brown, Bonnie Raitt, and Etta James, among others.

She lives in St. Augustine, Florida during the winter, although she and her husband return to their home in the Pacific Northwest during the summer months.

== Life and career ==
Born in Redding, California, United States, her family relocated to Yreka and later finally settled in Woodland, California. In the third grade at school, Bishop was involved in a staged public performance, and formed her first group three years later. Their collective name of Effervescence did not last long, when she discovered it was also a term for a bubbling laxative. As a teenager, Bishop joined her school friend, Jan Dunton, and performed as a folk singing twosome named duo.image. Her early musical career included a three-year spell with Roadside Attraction, before gaining experience in outfits named Toulouse Lautrec, Coda, and Skeezix. In 1975, she relocated to Los Angeles with her then husband, and sang at both the Whisky a Go Go and the Troubadour, albeit with other musician's bands. Four years later she moved to Seattle, Washington, and was divorced in 1982.

In 1983, she joined Cool Ray & the Shades, and later worked with the Rhythm Dogs. With the latter she issued two albums, Dogs Run Cheap and On a Journey. After her appearances in the title role in a play about the life of Janis Joplin in 1991, Bishop toured Japan with Big Brother and the Holding Company. She had earlier formed the Duffy Bishop Band in 1985, with Chris Carlson, Keith Lowe, Dave Jette and Henry Cooper. They toured around the world and, in 1994, Bishop and guitarist Carlson married and moved to Portland, Oregon. Their debut album for Burnside Distribution, Bottled Oddities was released the same year. Back To the Bone followed in July 1996. The Duffy Bishop Band won a Muddy Award for Best Regional Blues Act in 1994, and two years later for Best Contemporary Blues Act. Fly the Rocket (1999) was their third Burnside release, and AllMusic noted that "they apply an energy, tightness and focus to their music that serves them well." The Queen's Own Bootleg followed in 2002. Around this time Bishop became involved in costume design and worked with the Brass Ring Theater, Skid Row Theater, and Pasadena's American Academy of Dramatic Arts, with the latter seeing her design over a period of four years. In addition, Bishop appeared in musical theater in both San Francisco and Seattle, including the part of Dr. Frankenfurter in The Rocky Horror Show.

Outside of their touring commitments, Bishop and Carlson joined Teatro ZinZanni in 1998, a circus dinner theater show which undertook performances in Seattle, San Francisco and across Europe. They were also the headline act at the Portland Waterfront Blues Festival and the Winthrop Blues Festival. Bishop took the role of Madame ZinZanni, which had previously been performed by Thelma Houston, Joan Baez and Ann Wilson. The core of the Duffy Bishop Band then was Bishop, Carlson, Dover Weinberg (keyboards), Phil Haxton (bass guitar), and Jeff Minnick (drums). This line-up recorded Ooh Wee! (2003) for Trillium Records, although Haxton died before the album was released.

Who Is Duffy Bishop And Why Is She Not World Famous? a documentary on her life, was released in 2010. In April 2014, Bishop and her band self-released Find Your Way Home. The previous year Bishop and Carlson moved to St. Augustine, Florida for warmer weather during the winter months, although they travel back to the Pacific Northwest for three months each June.

Bishop and her band appeared at the 28th Waterfront Blues Festival in 2015, having previously performed there in 2012. The present day band consists of Bishop (vocals), Carlson (guitar), Kelly Dunn (drums), Jon Goforth (saxophone), Dean Mueller (bass guitar) and Brad Ulrich (saxophone).

== Discography ==
=== Albums ===
Year	Title	Record label
1994	Bottled Oddities	Burnside Distribution
1996	Back to the Bone	Burnside Distribution
1999	Fly the Rocket	Burnside Distribution
2002	The Queen's Own Bootleg	Burnside Distribution
2003	Ooh Wee!	Trillion Records
2005	Christmas in Latte Land	Water & Wine Records
2014	Find Your Way Home	Lil' Spinner Records LSDB8

== See also ==
- List of electric blues musicians
